= List of United States national rugby league team results =

The following article is a list of United States national rugby league team results.

== 1950s ==
#	Date	Home	Score	Away	Competition	Venue	Attendance
—N/a	27 May 1953	Monaro-Southern Division	25–34	United States	1953 American All Stars tour of Australia and New Zealand	Mankua Oval, Canberra	4,827
—N/a	30 May 1953	Sydney	52–25	United States	1953 American All Stars tour of Australia and New Zealand	Sydney Cricket Ground	65,453
—N/a	2 June 1953	New South Wales	62–41	United States	1953 American All Stars tour of Australia and New Zealand	Sydney Cricket Ground	32,554
—N/a	7 June 1953	Combined Country	35–9	United States	1953 American All Stars tour of Australia and New Zealand	Wollongong Showgrounds	11,787
—N/a	10 June 1953	Western Division	24–21	United States	1953 American All Stars tour of Australia and New Zealand	Dubbo Oval	4,717
—N/a	13 June 1953	Newcastle	10–19	United States	1953 American All Stars tour of Australia and New Zealand	Newcastle Sports Ground	14,160
—N/a	17 June 1953	Northern NSW	26–18	United States	1953 American All Stars tour of Australia and New Zealand	Brelsford Park, Coffs Harbour	5,400
—N/a	20 June 1953	Queensland	39–36	United States	1953 American All Stars tour of Australia and New Zealand	The Gabba, Brisbane	24,397
—N/a	24 June 1953	Far North Queensland	17–17	United States	1953 American All Stars tour of Australia and New Zealand	Parramatta Park, Cairns	6,042
—N/a	28 June 1953	North Queensland	38–17	United States	1953 American All Stars tour of Australia and New Zealand	Townsville Sports Reserve	7,898
—N/a	1 July 1953	Central West Queensland	26–21	United States	1953 American All Stars tour of Australia and New Zealand	Longreach	1,635
—N/a	5 July 1953	Central Queensland	33–26	United States	1953 American All Stars tour of Australia and New Zealand	Murray Street Grounds, Rockhampton	5,332
—N/a	7 July 1953	Brisbane	39–26	United States	1953 American All Stars tour of Australia and New Zealand	The Gabba, Brisbane	7,000
—N/a	15 July 1953	Toowoomba	29–15	United States	1953 American All Stars tour of Australia and New Zealand	Athletic Oval	5,778
—N/a	18 July 1953	Ipswich	15–16	United States	1953 American All Stars tour of Australia and New Zealand	North Ipswich Reserve	3,155
—N/a	19 July 1953	Wide Bay	33–33	United States	1953 American All Stars tour of Australia and New Zealand	Maryborough Showgrounds, Brisbane	6,166
—N/a	22 July 1953	Riverina	30–14	United States	1953 American All Stars tour of Australia and New Zealand	Anzac Park, Gundagai	2,560
—N/a	25 July 1953	New South Wales	27–18	United States	1953 American All Stars tour of Australia and New Zealand	Sydney Cricket Ground	19,686
—N/a	1 August 1953	Auckland	54–26	United States	1953 American All Stars tour of Australia and New Zealand	Carlaw Park, Auckland	12,377
—N/a	5 August 1953	Taranaki	18–21	United States	1953 American All Stars tour of Australia and New Zealand	Pukekura Park, New Plymouth	1,971
—N/a	8 August 1953	Wellington	8–17	United States	1953 American All Stars tour of Australia and New Zealand	Wellington Basin	
—N/a	11 August 1953	West Coast	27–10	United States	1953 American All Stars tour of Australia and New Zealand	Wingham Park, Greymouth	1,913
—N/a	15 August 1953	Canterbury	39–8	United States	1953 American All Stars tour of Australia and New Zealand	Addington Showground, Christchurch	4,273
—N/a	19 August 1953	North Auckland	6–25	United States	1953 American All Stars tour of Australia and New Zealand	Jubilee Park, To Whangerei	867 or 3,000
1	22 August 1953	New Zealand Māori	40–23	United States	1953 American All Stars tour of Australia and New Zealand	Carlaw Park, Auckland	6,673
—N/a	24 August 1953	South Auckland	19–2	United States	1953 American All Stars tour of Australia and New Zealand	Rugby Park	2,496
—N/a	20 December 1953	Languedoc XIII	30–22	United States	1953-54 American All Stars tour of France	Stade d'Albert Domec	5,000
—N/a	25 December 1953	Racing Club Albi	11–5	United States	1953-54 American All Stars tour of France	Stade Maurice Rigaud	5,800
—N/a	27 December 1953	France U-21	37–21	United States	1953-54 American All Stars tour of France	Stade Jean-Laffon	
—N/a	1 January 1954	Selection de Provence	12–22	United States	1953-54 American All Stars tour of France	Stade Saint Ruf	3,000
2	9 January 1954	France	31–0	United States	1953-54 American All Stars tour of France	(France) Parc de Princes, Paris	20,000

== 1980s ==
#	Date	Home	Score	Away	Competition	Venue	Attendance
3	1987	United States	10–23	Canada	Friendly	(United States) Pittsburgh	

== 1990s ==
#	Date	Home	Score	Away	Competition	Venue	Attendance
4	22 August 1993	United States	54–14	Canada	Friendly	(United States) Lake Placid	200
5	17 October 1993	Canada	2–32	United States	Friendly	(Canada) Ottawa, Ontario	
—N/a	9 February 1994	St Marys Saints	44–4	United States	Exhibition	Penrith Stadium	
6	19 June 1994	United States	22–0	Canada	Friendly	(United States) John Boyd Stadium, Atlantic City	
7	20 August 1994	United States	12–19	Russia	Friendly	(United States) Kezar Stadium, San Francisco	4,500
8	1 October 1994	Canada	10–22	United States	Friendly	(Canada) St Catharines, Ontario	
9	16 March 1995	United States	22–24	Ireland	Saint Patrick's Day Test	(United States) RFK Stadium, Washington D.C.	
10	10 June 1995	United States	10–66	Wales	Friendly	(United States) Ursinus College, Philadelphia	2,000
11	17 June 1995	United States	4–92	Wales	Friendly	(United States) Ursinus College, Philadelphia	2,500
12	26 August 1995	United States	44–0	Canada	Friendly	(United States) Baltimore Memorial Stadium, Baltimore	
13	16 October 1995	Cook Islands	64–6	United States	1995 Rugby League Emerging Nations Tournament	(England) Post Office Road, Featherstone	3,133
14	18 October 1995	Scotland	38–16	United States	1995 Rugby League Emerging Nations Tournament	(England) Sixfields Stadium, Northampton	2,088
15	20 October 1995	Russia	28–26	United States	1995 Rugby League Emerging Nations Tournament	(England) Wilderspool Stadium, Warrington	2,889
16	16 March 1996	United States	12–14	Ireland	Saint Patrick's Day Test	(United States) RFK Stadium, Washington D.C.	
17	1997	United States	50–10	Canada	Friendly	(United States) Philadelphia	
18	1998	United States	32–6	Canada	Friendly	(United States) Glen Mills Schools, Pennsylvania	
19	9 November 1999	United States	54–0	Japan	2000 Rugby League World Cup qualifying	(United States) Disney's Wide World of Sports Complex, Orlando	
20	11 November 1999	United States	68–0	Canada	2000 Rugby League World Cup qualifying	(United States) Disney's Wide World of Sports Complex, Orlando	
21	21 November 1999	United States	8–62	Lebanon	2000 Rugby League World Cup qualifying	(United States) Disney's Wide World of Sports Complex, Orlando	

== 2000s ==
#	Date	Home	Score	Away	Competition	Venue	Attendance
22	18 March 2000	United States	19–6	Ireland A	Saint Patrick's Day Test	(United States) Glen Mills Schools, Glen Mills, PA	
—N/a	11th August 2000	Forster XIII	32–12	United States	Exhibition	Forster Park	
—N/a	19th August 2000	South Sydney Rabbitohs	82–12	United States	Exhibition	Redfern Oval	20,535
23	October 2000	United States	0–110	England	Friendly	(United States) Orlando	
24	13 November 2000	Canada	10–52	United States	2000 Rugby League Emerging Nations Tournament	(England) Court Place Farm, Oxford	500
25	17 November 2000	Italy	40–16	United States	2000 Rugby League Emerging Nations Tournament	(England) The Shay, Halifax	2,000
26	20 November 2000	Morocco	10–50	United States	2000 Rugby League Emerging Nations Tournament	(England) Robin Park Arena, Wigan	500
27	16 March 2002	United States	24–22	Ireland A	Saint Patrick's Day Test	(United States) Glen Mills Schools, Glen Mills, PA	
28	1 June 2002	United States	26–10	Japan	Friendly		
—N/a	9 September 2002	Tatarstan	30–24	United States	Friendly	Central Republic Stadium	10,000
29	13 September 2002	Russia	54–10	United States	Friendly	(Russia) Moscow	
30	6 October 2002	New Zealand	74–14	United States	Friendly		
31	15 March 2003	United States	20–16	Ireland A	Saint Patrick's Day Test	(United States) Glen Mills Schools, Glen Mills, PA	
32	6 May 2003	Russia	44–14	United States	Friendly		
33	27 June 2003	United States	78–6	Japan	Friendly		
34	24 March 2004	United States	41–10	Ireland A	Saint Patrick's Day Test	(United States) Memorial Stadium, Savannah, Georgia	
35	9 May 2004	Ireland	74–16	United States	Victory Cup	(Russia) Moscow	
36	12 May 2004	Russia	64–8	United States	Victory Cup	(Russia) Moscow	
37	1 December 2004	United States	24–36	Australia	Friendly	(United States) Franklin Field, Philadelphia	
38	26 January 2006	United States	40–10	Japan	Friendly		
39	4 June 2006	Italy	34–6	United States	Columbus Cup	(Australia) Parramatta Stadium, Sydney	2,000
40	28 October 2006	United States	54–18	Japan	2008 Rugby League World Cup qualifying	(United States) Aston Bulls Sports Ground, Pennsylvania	1,200
—N/a	4 November 2007	Cumbria	70–0	United States	Friendly	(Cumbria) Craven Park	1,028
41	9 November 2007	Samoa	42–10	United States	2008 Rugby League World Cup qualifying	(England) Halton Stadium, Widnes	753
42	14 November 2009	United States	37–22	Jamaica	2009 Atlantic Cup	(United States) Hodges Stadium, Jacksonville	2,000

== 2010s ==
#	Date	Home	Score	Away	Competition	Venue	Attendance
43	19 September 2010	Canada	16–22	United States	Colonial Cup	(Canada) Richardson Memorial Stadium, Kingston, Ontario	
44	16 November 2010	United States	36–26	Jamaica	2010 Atlantic Cup	(United States) Hodges Stadium, Jacksonville	
45	20 November 2010	United States	46–12	Canada	2010 Atlantic Cup	(United States) Hodges Stadium, Jacksonville	2,800
46	22 March 2011	United States	8–26	Ireland A	Saint Patrick's Day Test	(United States) Garthwaite Stadium, Philadelphia	
47	27 August 2011	United States	18–2	Canada	Colonial Cup	(United States) Garthwaite Stadium, Philadelphia	
48	18 September 2011	Canada	18–16	United States	Colonial Cup	(Canada) Fletcher's Fields, Markham, Ontario	2,000
49	15 October 2011	United States	40–4	South Africa	2013 Rugby League World Cup qualifying	(United States) Campbell's Field, New Jersey	
50	23 October 2011	United States	40–4	Jamaica	2013 Rugby League World Cup qualifying	(United States) Campbell's Field, New Jersey	
51	18 March 2012	United States	38–20	Ireland A	Saint Patrick's Day Test	(United States) Widener University, Philadelphia	
52	12 May 2012	Tonga	28–20	United States	Friendly		
53	8 September 2012	Canada	24–28	United States	Colonial Cup	(Canada) Lamport Stadium, Toronto	4,675
54	22 September 2012	United States	36–14	Canada	Colonial Cup	(United States) Staples High School, Fairfield, Connecticut	
—N/a	26 October 2012	Queensland Murri	72–18	United States	Friendly	(Australia) Kaiser Stadium	
55	2 June 2013	United States	10–34	Samoa	Friendly	(United States) Aloha Stadium, Halawa, Hawaii	
56	6 July 2013	Canada	36–20	United States	Colonial Cup	(Canada) Lamport Stadium, Toronto	7,200
57	24 August 2013	United States	44–16	Canada	Colonial Cup	(United States) Garthwaite Stadium, Philadelphia	1,075
58	7 September 2013	Canada	20–28	United States	Colonial Cup	(Canada) Lamport Stadium, Toronto	3,128
59	24 September 2013	Canada	22–30	United States	Colonial Cup	(Canada) Lamport Stadium, Toronto	5,176
60	18 October 2013	France	18–22	United States	Friendly	(France) Stade des Minimes, Toulouse	
61	30 October 2013	Cook Islands	20–32	United States	2013 Rugby League World Cup	(England) Memorial Stadium, Bristol	7,247
62	3 November 2013	Wales	16–24	United States	2013 Rugby League World Cup	(Wales) Racecourse Ground, Wrexham	8,019
63	7 November 2013	Scotland	22–8	United States	2013 Rugby League World Cup	(England) Salford City Stadium, Salford	6,041
64	16 November 2013	Australia	62–0	United States	2013 Rugby League World Cup	(Wales) Racecourse Ground, Wrexham	5,762
65	19 July 2014	United States	18–12	Samoa	Test match	(United States) Aloha Stadium, Honolulu	
66	9 August 2014	Canada	52–14	United States	Colonial Cup	(Canada) Lamport Stadium, Toronto	7,356
67	19 September 2015	United States	28–36	Canada	Colonial Cup	(United States) Garthwaite Stadium, Philadelphia	
68	18 October 2015	United States	28–34	Canada	Colonial Cup	(United States) Garthwaite Stadium, Philadelphia	
69	4 December 2015	United States	20–14	Jamaica	2017 Rugby League World Cup qualifying	(United States) Hodges Stadium, Jacksonville	
70	12 December 2015	United States	34–24	Canada	2017 Rugby League World Cup qualifying	(United States) Hodges Stadium, Jacksonville	
71	23 July 2016	United States	54–4	Jamaica	2016 Americas Championship	(United States) Garthwaite Stadium, Philadelphia	
72	24 September 2016	Canada	8–14	United States	2016 Americas Championship, Colonial Cup	(Canada) Lamport Stadium, Toronto	
73	1 October 2016	United States	20–14	Canada	Colonial Cup	(United States) Eden Park, Wilmington, Delaware	
74	22 July 2017	United States	48–6	Jamaica	2017 Americas Championship	(United States) Hodges Stadium, Jacksonville	
75	16 September 2017	United States	36–18	Canada	2017 Americas Championship	(Canada) Lamport Stadium, Toronto	
76	28 October 2017	Fiji	58–12	United States	2017 Rugby League World Cup	(Australia) Townsville Stadium, Queensland	
77	5 November 2017	Italy	46–0	United States	2017 Rugby League World Cup	(Australia) Townsville Stadium, Queensland	
78	12 November 2017	Papua New Guinea	64–0	United States	2017 Rugby League World Cup	(Papua New Guinea) Lloyd Robson Oval, Port Moresby	
79	13 November 2018	United States	62–0	Chile	2018 Americas Championship	(United States) Hodges Stadium, Jacksonville	
80	17 November 2018	United States	10–16	Jamaica	2018 Americas Championship	(United States) Hodges Stadium, Jacksonville	
81	22 June 2019	Jamaica	26–24	United States	Friendly	(Jamaica) UWI Mona Bowl Football Field, Kingston	
82	16 November 2019	United States	16–38	Cook Islands	2021 Men's Rugby League World Cup qualifying	(United States) Hodges Stadium, Jacksonville	

== 2020s ==
#	Date	Home	Score	Away	Competition	Venue	Attendance	Ref.
83	2 December 2023	Jamaica	26–30	United States	Friendly	Mona Bowl, University of West Indies, Kingston, Jamaica		
84	1 March 2024	Canada	16–16	United States	Colonial Cup	(United States) Valley High School, Las Vegas		
85	4 December 2024	South Africa	18–38	United States	Winter tour of South Africa	(South Africa) Quins-Bobbies Rugby Club, Pretoria		
86	7 December 2024	South Africa	32–44	United States	Winter tour of South Africa	(South Africa) Grizzlies Stadium, Pretoria		
—N/a	26 February 2025	United States	C–C	Greece	Friendly	(United States) Silver Bowl Park, Las Vegas		
87	28 February 2025	United States	10–46	Greece	Friendly	(United States) Silver Bowl Park, Las Vegas		
88	27 February 2026	United States	28–20	Scotland	Friendly	(United States) Cougar Stadium, Las Vegas		
89	17 October 2026	Wales	44–12	United States	Friendly	(Wales) The Wern, Merthyr Tydfil	1,050	

== See also ==
- United States Rugby League
- United States national rugby league team
- Rugby league in the United States
