= List of Jamaica national rugby league team results =

The following is a list of results for the Jamaica national rugby league team since their first match in 2009 against the United States. Matches marked with a † are not sanctioned by the International Rugby League. The matches were either not played by two IRL-recognised national teams, or were played with modified rules (often an extended bench and unlimited interchanges).

== All-time record ==
Below is the head-to-head record of the Jamaican national rugby league team as of 16 November 2026.

Team	First Played	Played	Win	Draw	Loss	%	Last meeting
Canada	2010	12	4	1	7	33%	2026
England Knights	2019	2	0	0	2	0%	2021
France	2025	2	0	0	2	0%	2025
Lebanon	2021	1	0	0	1	0%	2022
Ireland	2016	1	1	0	1	50%	2022
New Zealand	2021	1	0	0	1	0%	2022
Scotland	2021	1	0	1	0	50%	2021
South Africa	2011	1	1	0	0	100%	2011
United States	2009	8	2	0	7	22%	2023
Wales	2016	2	0	1	1	0%	2024
Total	2009	33	8	3	22	24%	2026

== 2000s ==
Date	Home	Score	Away	Competition	Venue	Attendance
14 November 2009	United States	37 – 22	Jamaica	2009 Atlantic Cup	(United States) Hodges Stadium, Jacksonville	3,500

== 2010s ==
Date	Home	Score	Away	Competition	Venue	Attendance
16 November 2010	United States	36 – 26	Jamaica	2010 Atlantic Cup	(United States) Hodges Stadium, Jacksonville	500
18 November 2010	Canada	12 – 32	Jamaica	2010 Atlantic Cup	(United States) Hodges Stadium, Jacksonville	800
31 July 2011	Canada	40 – 10	Jamaica	Caribbean Carnival Cup	(Canada) Fletcher's Field, Ontario	1,500
19 October 2011	South Africa	6 – 20	Jamaica	2013 Rugby League World Cup qualifying	(United States) Campbell's Field, New Jersey	
23 October 2011	United States	40 – 4	Jamaica	2013 Rugby League World Cup qualifying	(United States) Campbell's Field, New Jersey	800
21 July 2012	Canada	18 – 12	Jamaica	Caribbean Carnival Cup	(Canada) Lamport Stadium, Toronto	4,630
20 July 2013	Canada	38 – 14	Jamaica	Caribbean Carnival Cup	(Canada) Lamport Stadium, Toronto	5,700
19 July 2014	Canada	24 – 20	Jamaica	Caribbean Carnival Cup	(Canada) Lamport Stadium, Toronto	3,129
4 December 2015	United States	20 – 14	Jamaica	2017 Rugby League World Cup qualifying	(United States) Hodges Stadium, Jacksonville	
8 December 2015	Canada	18 – 18	Jamaica	2017 Rugby League World Cup qualifying	(United States) Spec Martin Stadium, DeLand	
16 July 2016	Canada	38 – 2	Jamaica	2016 America's Cup	(United States) Falls Township Park, Levittown	
23 July 2016	United States	54 – 4	Jamaica	2016 America's Cup	(United States) AA Garthwaite Stadium, Conshohocken	
16 October 2016	Ireland	16 – 68	Jamaica	Friendly	(Republic of Ireland) Carlisle Grounds, Bray	
21 October 2016	Wales	16 – 16	Jamaica	Friendly	(England) Belle Vue, Wakefield	1,378
22 July 2017	United States	48 – 6	Jamaica	2017 America's Cup	(United States) Hodges Stadium, Jacksonville	n/a
29 August 2017	Jamaica	28 – 14	Canada	2017 America's Cup	(Jamaica) University of the West Indies, Kingston	1,500
13 October 2017	France	34 – 12	Jamaica	Friendly	(France) Stade Gilbert Brutus, Perpignan	4,850
13 November 2018	Canada	8 – 38	Jamaica	2021 Men's Rugby League World Cup qualifying	(United States) Hodges Stadium, Jacksonville	
17 November 2018	Jamaica	16 – 10	United States	2021 Men's Rugby League World Cup qualifying	(United States) Hodges Stadium, Jacksonville	
22 June 2019	Jamaica	26 – 24	United States	Friendly	(Jamaica) UWI Mona Bowl Football Field, Kingston	
20 October 2019	England Knights	38 – 6 (†)	Jamaica	Friendly	(England) Headingley Stadium, Leeds	7,113

== 2020s ==
Date	Home	Score	Away	Competition	Venue	Attendance
15 October 2021	England Knights	56–4 (†)	Jamaica	Friendly	(England) Mend-A-Hose Jungle, Castleford	2,250
24 October 2021	Scotland	30–30	Jamaica	Friendly	(England) Post Office Road, Featherstone	
7 October 2022	Cumbria	28–12 (†)	Jamaica	Friendly	(England) Derwent Park, Workington	
16 October 2022	Jamaica	2–48	Ireland	2021 Rugby League World Cup	(England) Headingley Stadium, Leeds	6,320
22 October 2022	New Zealand	68–6	Jamaica	2021 Rugby League World Cup	(England) Headingley Stadium, Leeds	6,829
30 October 2022	Lebanon	74–12	Jamaica	2021 Rugby League World Cup	(England) Leigh Sports Village, Leigh	5,006
2 December 2023	Jamaica	26–30	United States	Friendly	(Jamaica) University of West Indies, Kingston	
15 October 2024	Wales	22–16	Jamaica	Friendly	(Wales) The Gnoll, Neath	
19 October 2024	Canada	28–6	Jamaica	Friendly	(Canada) Lamport Stadium, Toronto	
25 October 2025	France	36–0	Jamaica	2026 World Cup Qualification – Northern Hemisphere Playoff	(France) Stadium Municipal d'Albi, Albi	6,200
22 November 2025	Jamaica	34–12	Canada	Friendly	(Jamaica) University of West Indies, Kingston	
10 October 2026	Canada	42–6	Jamaica	Friendly	(Canada) Terry Fox Stadium, Brampton	
