= List of Canada national rugby league team results =

The following article is a list of Canada national rugby league team results since they first started competing in International rugby league in 1987.

== All-time records ==
Below is the head-to-head record of the Canadian national rugby league team, up to date as of 16 November 2026.

Against	First played	Played	Won	Lost	Drawn	% won	Last played	For	Against	Diff
Bosnia and Herzegovina	2019	1	1	0	0	100%	2018	78	2	+76
Chile	2018	1	1	0	0	100%	2018	62	12	+50
England Lionhearts	2012	2	0	2	0	0%	2014	16	102	–86
Fiji	2016	1	0	1	0	0%	2016	12	26	–14
France	1995	1	0	1	0	0%	1995	32	72	–40
Italy	2000	1	0	1	0	0%	2000	6	66	–60
Jamaica	2010	12	7	4	1	58.33%	2026	292	220	+72
Japan	1999	2	1	1	0	50%	2000	28	26	+2
Lebanon	2012	1	1	0	0	100%	2012	36	18	+18
Netherlands	2026	1	1	0	0	100%	2026	34	6	+28
Norway	2026	1	1	0	0	100%	2026	56	6	+50
Scotland	2026	1	0	1	0	0%	2026	10	22	–12
Serbia	2019	1	0	1	0	0%	2019	8	36	–28
South Africa	2011	1	0	1	0	0%	2011	22	36	–14
United States	1993	28	5	22	1	20.83%	2024	448	914	–466
Total	1993	55	18	35	2	32.73&	2026	1,140	1,564	-424

Win Draw Loss

== 1980s ==
Date	Home	Score	Away	Competition	Venue	Attendance
1987	United States	10–23	Canada	Friendly	(United States) Pittsburgh	

== 1990s ==
Date	Home	Score	Away	Competition	Venue	Attendance
22 August 1993	United States	14–54	Canada	Friendly	(United States) Lake Placid, New York	
17 October 1993	Canada	2–32	United States	Friendly	(Canada) Ottawa, Ontario	
19 June 1994	United States	22–0	Canada	Friendly	(United States) John Boyd Stadium, Atlantic City	
1 October 1994	Canada	10–22	United States	Friendly	(Canada) St. Catharines, Ontario	
26 August 1995	United States	44–0	Canada	Friendly	(United States) Baltimore Memorial Stadium, Baltimore	
June 1996	Canada	32–72	France	Friendly	(Canada) Montreal	
1997	United States	50–10	Canada	Friendly	(United States) Philadelphia	
1998	United States	32–6	Canada	Friendly	(United States) Glen Mills Schools, Pennsylvania	
9 November 1999	United States	68–0	Canada	2000 World Cup Qualifying	(United States) Disney's Wide World of Sports Complex, Florida	
15 November 1999	Canada	0–14	Japan	2000 World Cup Qualifying	(United States) Disney's Wide World of Sports Complex, Florida	

== 2000s ==
Date	Home	Score	Away	Competition	Venue	Attendance
13 November 2000	Canada	10–52	United States	2000 Emerging Nations Tournament	(England) Court Place Farm, Oxford	500
15 November 2000	Canada	6–66	Italy	2000 Emerging Nations Tournament	(England) Cougar Park, Keighley	1,028
20 November 2000	Canada	28–12	Japan	2000 Emerging Nations Tournament	(England) Robin Park Arena, Wigan	500

== 2010s ==
Date	Home	Score	Away	Competition	Venue	Attendance
31 July 2010	Canada	8–12	New England	Friendly	(United States) Sea Isle City, New Jersey	
19 September 2010	Canada	16–22	United States	2010 Colonial Cup	(Canada) Richardson Memorial Stadium, Kingston, Ontario	
18 November 2010	Canada	12–32	Jamaica	2010 Atlantic Cup	(United States) Hodges Stadium, Jacksonville	800
20 November 2010	United States	46–12	Canada	2010 Atlantic Cup	(United States) Hodges Stadium, Jacksonville	2,800
31 July 2011	Canada	40–10	Jamaica	Caribbean Carnival Cup	(Canada) Fletcher's Fields, Markham, Ontario	1,500
27 August 2011	United States	18–2	Canada	2011 Colonial Cup	(United States) Garthwaite Stadium, Philadelphia	
18 September 2011	Canada	18–16	United States	2011 Colonial Cup	(Canada) Fletcher's Fields, Markham, Ontario	2,000
9 October 2011	Canada	22–36	South Africa	Friendly	(Canada) Fletcher's Fields, Markham, Ontario	1,005
17 June 2012	Canada	16–22	Royal Air Force	Friendly	(Canada) Fletcher's Fields, Markham, Ontario	
21 July 2012	Canada	18–12	Jamaica	Caribbean Carnival Cup	(Canada) Lamport Stadium, Toronto	4,630
11 August 2012	Canada	36–18	Lebanon	Friendly	(Canada) Lamport Stadium, Toronto	2,300
8 September 2012	Canada	24–28	United States	2012 Colonial Cup	(Canada) Lamport Stadium, Toronto	4,000
22 September 2012	United States	36–14	Canada	2012 Colonial Cup	(United States) Staples High School, Fairfield, Connecticut	
6 October 2012	Canada	4–68	England Lionhearts	Friendly	(Canada) Lamport Stadium, Toronto	5,100
6 July 2013	Canada	36–20	United States	2013 Colonial Cup	(Canada) Lamport Stadium, Toronto	7,200
20 July 2013	Canada	38–14	Jamaica	Caribbean Carnival Cup	(Canada) Lamport Stadium, Toronto	5,700
24 August 2013	United States	44–16	Canada	2013 Colonial Cup	(United States) Garthwaite Stadium, Philadelphia	1,075
7 September 2013	Canada	20–28	United States	2013 Colonial Cup	(Canada) Lamport Stadium, Toronto	3,128
24 September 2013	Canada	22–30	United States	2013 Colonial Cup	(Canada) Lamport Stadium, Toronto	5,176
21 June 2014	Canada	18–40	Royal Air Force	Friendly	(Canada) Lamport Stadium, Toronto	7,356
5 July 2014	Canada	12–36	England Lionhearts	Friendly	(Canada) Lamport Stadium, Toronto	4,710
19 July 2014	Canada	24–20	Jamaica	Caribbean Carnival Cup	(Canada) Lamport Stadium, Toronto	3,129
9 August 2014	Canada	52–14	United States	2014 Colonial Cup	(Canada) Lamport Stadium, Toronto	7,356
19 September 2015	United States	28–36	Canada	2015 Colonial Cup	(United States) Garthwaite Stadium, Philadelphia	
18 October 2015	United States	28–34	Canada	2015 Colonial Cup	(United States) Garthwaite Stadium, Philadelphia	
8 December 2015	Canada	18–18	Jamaica	2017 World Cup Qualifying	(United States) Spec Martin Stadium, DeLand, Florida	
12 December 2015	United States	34–24	Canada	2017 World Cup Qualifying	(United States) Hodges Stadium, Jacksonville	
17 July 2016	Canada	38–2	Jamaica	2016 Americas Championship	(United States) Bucks County Sharks Stadium, Levittown, Pennsylvania	
20 August 2016	Canada	12–26	Fiji	Friendly	(United States) Aloha Stadium, Honolulu	
24 September 2016	Canada	8–14	United States	2016 Americas Championship	(Canada) Lamport Stadium, Toronto	
1 October 2016	United States	20–14	Canada	2016 Colonial Cup	(United States) Eden Park, Wilmington, Delaware	
13 November 2018	Canada	8–38	Jamaica	2018 Americas Championship	(United States) Hodges Stadium, Jacksonville	
17 November 2018	Canada	62–12	Chile	2018 Americas Championship	(United States) Hodges Stadium, Jacksonville	
14 September 2019	Bosnia and Herzegovina	2–78	Canada	2019 Wolverines tour of Serbia	(Serbia) SC Inge, Belgrade	150
18 September 2019	Serbia B	6–56	Canada	2019 Wolverines tour of Serbia	(Serbia) Belgrade	
21 September 2019	Serbia	36–8	Canada	2019 Wolverines tour of Serbia	(Serbia) Makis Stadium, Belgrade	250

== 2020s ==
Date	Home	Score	Away	Competition	Venue	Attendance
1 March 2024	United States	16–16	Canada	Friendly	(United States) Valley High, Las Vegas	
19 October 2024	Canada	28–6	Jamaica	Friendly	(Canada) Lamport Stadium, Toronto	
22 November 2025	Jamaica	34–12	Canada	Friendly	(Jamaica) University of West Indies, Kingston	
2 July 2026	Norway	6–56	Canada	2026 Wolverines tour of Europe	(Norway) Vigernesjordet, Lillestrøm	
5 July 2026	Scotland	22–10	Canada	2026 Wolverines tour of Europe	(Scotland) Hawick RFC, Hawick	
11 July 2026	Netherlands	6–34	Canada	2026 Wolverines tour of Europe	(Netherlands) Rotterdamse RC Beekweg, Rotterdam	
10 October 2026	Canada	42–6	Jamaica	Friendly	(Canada) Terry Fox Stadium, Brampton	

== See also ==
- Canada Rugby League
- Canada national rugby league team
- Rugby league in Canada
