= Americas Rugby League Championship =

International rugby league football tournament

- Sport: Rugby league
- Inaugural season: 2016
- Region: North America (ARL)
- Holders: Jamaica (1st title)
- Most titles: United States (2 titles)
- Related competition: Colonial Cup

The Americas Rugby League Championship is an international rugby league football tournament contested by Americas national rugby league teams. The tournament was created to follow the success of the Americas region of the 2015 Americas qualification tournament for the 2017 Rugby League World Cup.

The tournament is both a stand alone competition and a qualification tournament for the Rugby League World Cup depending on the year.

== History ==
=== Background ===
Previously, the only regular international competitions in North America were the Colonial Cup between the USA and Canada and the Caribbean Carnival Cup between Jamaica and Canada. A predecessor competition, the Atlantic Cup, was held in 2009 and 2010.

=== 2015–present ===
The Americas Rugby League Championship was in created in 2016 follow the success of the Americas region of the 2015 Americas qualification tournament for the 2017 Rugby League World Cup. Initially held annually, the tournament switched to every two years following the 2018 event, however the 2020 edition was cancelled due to the COVID-19 pandemic. The tournament restared in 2023 and saw a women's event added for the first time, men's event did not occur for unknown reasons. In 2024, the women's tournament doubled as part of the 2026 World Cup qualification process. Brazil withdrew from the tournament and their fixtures were replaced with friendlies against the USA Pioneers.

== Results ==
=== Men's ===
Year	1st	2nd	3rd	4th	Ref.
(United States) (Canada) 2016	United States	Canada	Jamaica	N/A	
(United States) (Canada) 2017	United States	Jamaica	Canada	N/A	
(United States) 2018	Jamaica	United States	Canada	Chile	
(Jamaica) 2020	Cancelled due to the COVID-19 pandemic: Canada, Chile, Jamaica, United States				
(Jamaica) 2023	Cancelled; reason unknown: Brazil, Canada, Jamaica, United States				

=== Women's ===
Year	1st	2nd	3rd	Ref.
(Jamaica) 2023	Canada	United States	Jamaica	
(United States) 2024	Canada	United States	Jamaica	
