= Paul White (rugby league) =

Former Jamaica international rugby league footballer

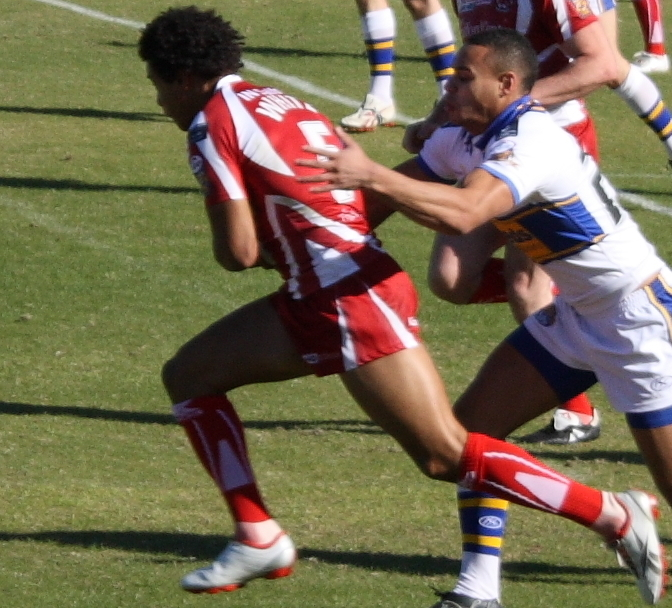

Personal information
- Born: 7 December 1982 (age 43) Bradford, England

Playing information
- Height: 5 ft 9 in (1.75 m)
- Weight: 13 st 0 lb (83 kg)

Rugby league
- Position: Fullback, Wing, Stand-off, Scrum-half, Hooker
Club
Years	Team	Pld	T	G	FG	P
2002–05	Huddersfield Giants	47	22	16	0	120
2006–07	Wakefield Trinity Wildcats	39	15	0	0	60
2007	Halifax	6	4	0	0	16
2008–09	Salford City Reds	33	31	0	0	124
2010–12	Halifax	68	49	0	0	196
2013–16	Keighley Cougars	100	82	1	0	330
	Total	293	203	17	0	846
Representative
Years	Team	Pld	T	G	FG	P
2010–11	Jamaica	4	3	4	0	20

Rugby union
Club
Years	Team	Pld	T	G	FG	P
2011	Preston Grasshoppers	6	6	0	0	30

Paul White (born 7 December 1982) is an English-born former professional rugby league footballer who played in the 2000s and 2010s. He played at representative level for Jamaica, and at club level for the Huddersfield Giants, the Wakefield Trinity Wildcats, Halifax (two spells), the Salford City Reds and the Keighley Cougars, primarily as a wing, but also as a fullback, stand-off, scrum-half or hooker.

In 2011, for the beginning of a rugby union season, Paul tried his hand at rugby union for Preston Grasshoppers scoring 6 tries in 6 games.

== Representative career ==
Paul White played, and scored a try in Jamaica's 26–36 defeat by United States in the 2010 Atlantic Cup at Hodges Stadium, Jacksonville, Florida on Tuesday 16 November 2010.
