= Taioalo Vaivai =

US international rugby league footballer

Junior Vaivai
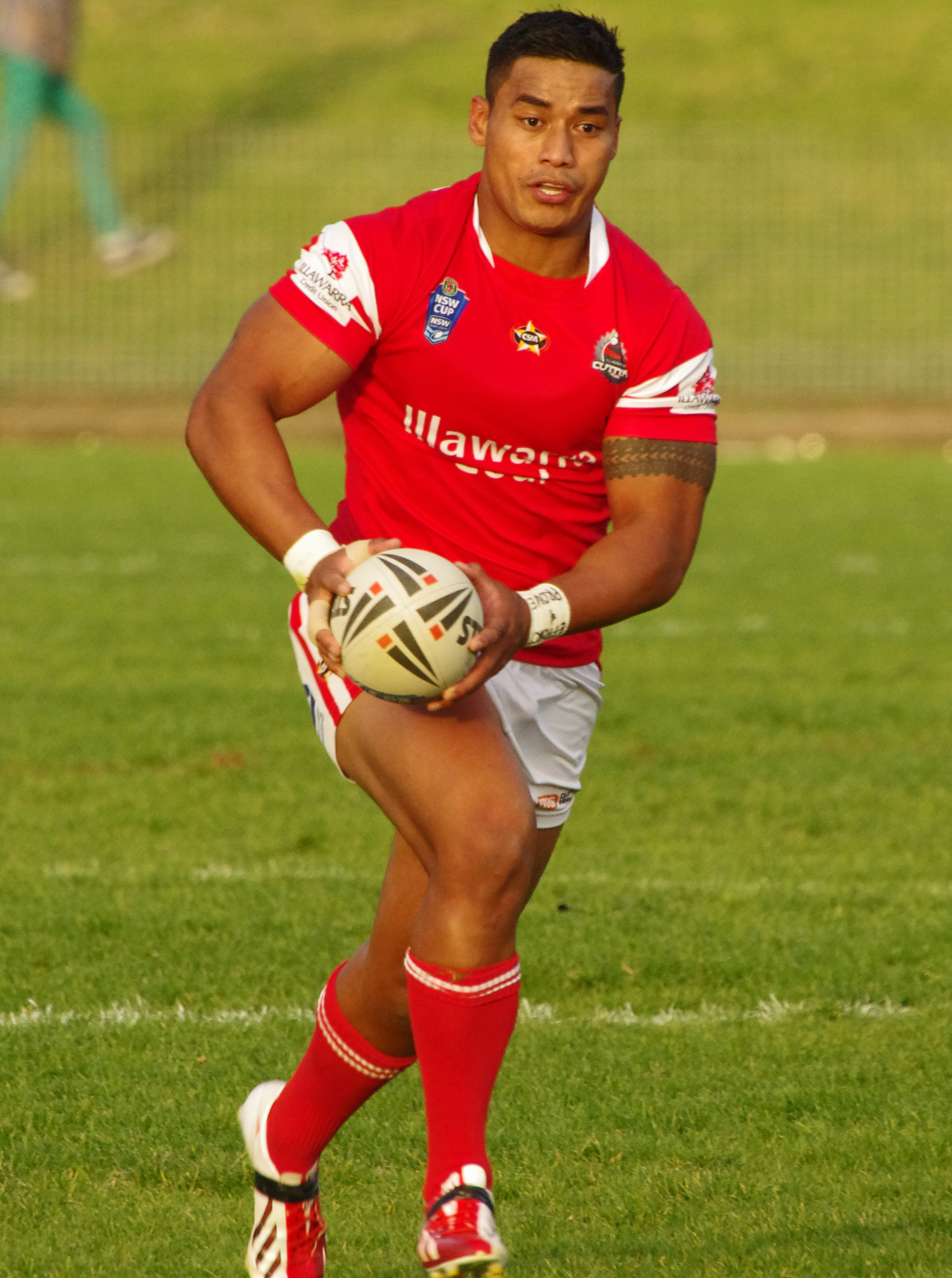

Personal information
- Full name: Taioalo Junior Vaivai
- Born: 18 January 1990 (age 36) Auckland, New Zealand
- Height: 5 ft 10 in (179 cm)
- Weight: 15 st 10 lb (100 kg)

Playing information
- Position: Centre, Five-eighth
Club
Years	Team	Pld	T	G	FG	P
2009–11	South Sydney	21	8	0	0	4
2011	Penrith Panthers	11	0	0	0	0
2018–19	Hull KR	35	14	0	0	56
2019(loan)	→ York City Knights	3	3	0	0	12
2019–22	Toulouse Olympique	35	25	0	0	100
	Total	105	50	0	0	172
Representative
Years	Team	Pld	T	G	FG	P
2016–17	United States	8	7	17	0	62
2019–	United States 9s	1	1	0	0	4
- Source: As of 24 January 2023

Taioalo "Junior" Vaivai (born 18 January 1990) is a Professional Rugby League player. He is also a United States international who last played as a centre for Toulouse Olympique in the English Super League. He has previously played for the Penrith Panthers, Hull Kingston Rovers and the South Sydney Rabbitohs in the National Rugby League.

== Background ==
Vaivai was born in Auckland, New Zealand. He also played his junior football for Redbank Plains Bears in the Ipswich junior rugby league. Vaivai played his junior rugby league for the Goodna Eagles and the Easts Tigers in Brisbane, Australia. Vaivai has previously worked as a personal trainer at Aventus Health and Fitness, in Warrawong, Australia. He is the cousin of American professional wrestler and actor, Dwayne "The Rock" Johnson.

== Senior career ==
=== South Sydney Rabbitohs (2009–11) ===
Covering for an injury to Beau Champion, Vaivai made his National Rugby League début in round 24 of the 2009 season, against the Penrith Panthers. In 2009 and 2010, he played for the South Sydney Rabbitohs in the National Youth Competition. Vaivai scored 40 tries in 40 matches and kicked 40 goals from 42 attempts . Vaivai was named at centre, in the 2009 National Youth Competition 'Team of the Year.' Vaivai was also named in Steve Price’s Toa Samoa squad in 2010 but was ruled out due to injury.

=== Penrith Panthers (2011) ===
Vaivai joined Penrith for the remainder of the 2011 season, making his club début as a late call-up to cover for an injury to Luke Lewis.

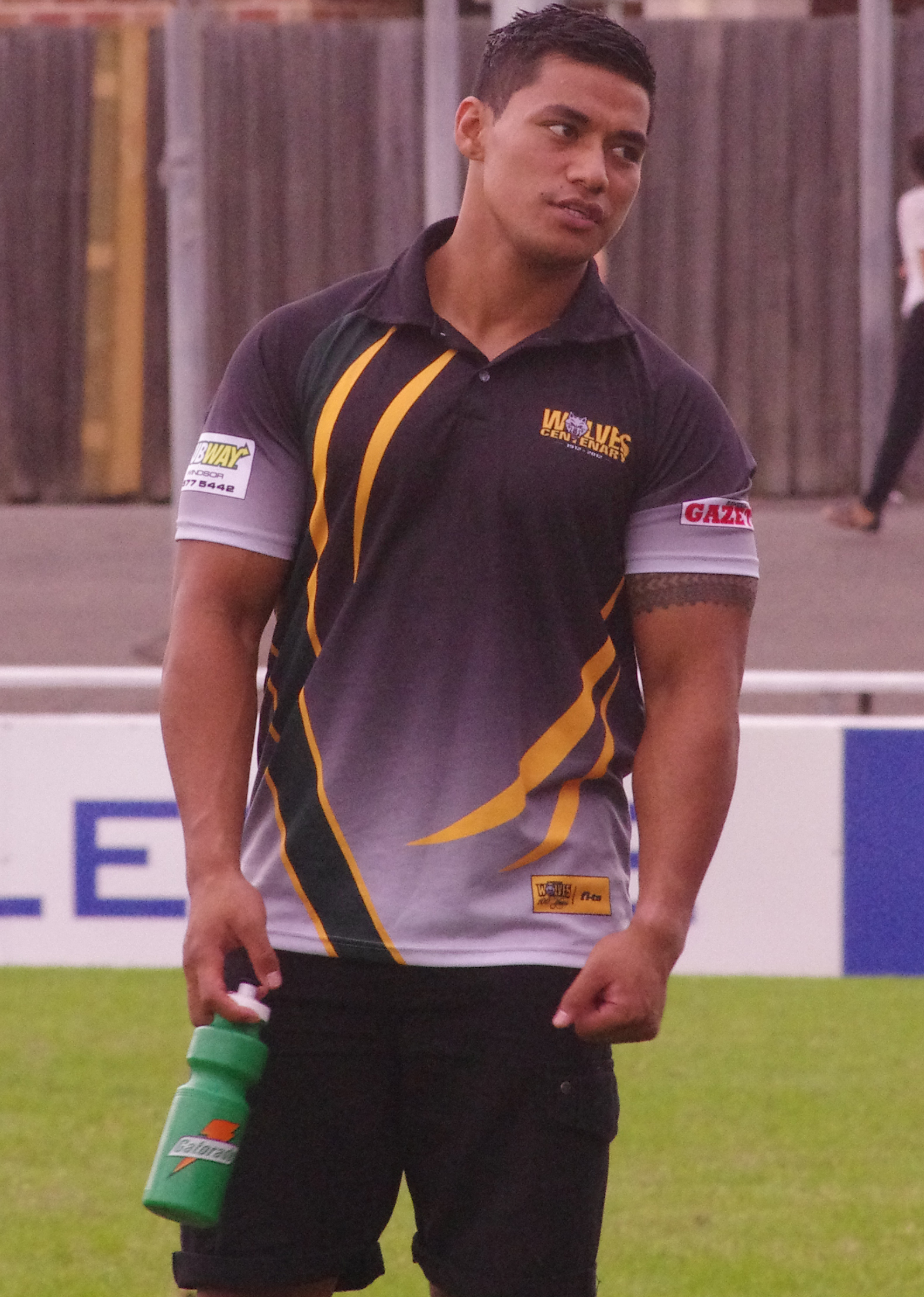
Vaivai training with the Penrith Panthers during his time at the club

=== Illawarra Cutters (2013) ===
In 2013, Vaivai joined the Illawarra Cutters in the New South Wales Cup.

=== Western Suburbs Red Devils (2017) ===
In 2017, Vaivai played for the Western Suburbs Red Devils in the Illawarra Rugby League competition.

=== Hull Kingston Rovers (2018 – present) ===
In February 2018, Vaivai signed a one-year contract with Hull Kingston Rovers in the Super League. After a lengthy and drawn-out Visa application process, which frustratingly prevented Vaivai from making his début for Hull Kingston Rovers, Taioalo finally made his first appearance for Hull Kingston Rovers in round 11 of the 2018 Super League season, in a 40–26 defeat against the Warrington Wolves at the Halliwell Jones Stadium. Vaivai scored his first try for Hull Kingston Rovers on 13 May 2018, in a 10–28 Challenge Cup home defeat against Wigan at Craven Park. It was revealed on 2 July 2018, that Vaivai had signed a new two-year contract extension to play and remain at Hull Kingston Rovers until at least the end of the 2020 rugby league season.

=== York City Knights (Loan) ===
It was announced on 23 May 2019, that Vaivai had joined the York City Knights on a one month loan deal with fellow Hull Kingston Rovers' teammate, Will Oakes. On 26 May 2019, Vaivai made a try-scoring début for York City in a 12–16 victory over Widnes.

=== Toulouse Olympique ===
In 2019, Vaivai joined RFL Championship side Toulouse Olympique and was part of the side which gained promotion to the Super League after defeating Featherstone in the 2021 Million Pound Game. On 18 May 2022, Vaivai announced he was departing Toulouse with immediate effect.

== Representative career ==
=== USA (2016–17) ===
Qualifying through his American Samoan mother and grandmother, Vaivai made his début for the United States in their 2016 America's Cup match against Jamaica.

On 24 September 2017, Vaivai was named in the United States' 23-man squad for the 2017 Rugby League World Cup.

=== Representative career statistics ===
Date	Opponent	T	G	FG	Pts	Ref
23 July 2016	Jamaica	1	1/1	0	6	
24 September 2016	Canada	0	1/3	0	2	
1 October 2016	Canada	1	4/4	0	12	
22 July 2017	Jamaica	3	8/8	0	28	
16 September 2017	Canada	1	3	0	10	
28 October 2017	Fiji	1	0	0	4	
5 November 2017	Italy	0	0	0	0	
12 November 2017	Papua New Guinea	0	0	0	0	

== Honours ==
=== Individual Honours (Career Awards and Accolades) ===
- 2009 National Youth Competition: 'Team of the Year'
