= Vaka Manupuna =

American football player (born 1982)

No. 55
- Position: Defensive tackle

Personal information
- Born: June 30, 1982 (age 44); Honolulu, Hawaii, U.S.
- Listed height: 6 ft 4 in (1.93 m)
- Listed weight: 300 lb (136 kg)

Career information
- College: Colorado
- NFL draft: 2006: undrafted

Career history
- Washington Redskins (2006)*; New York Jets (2006)*; Washington Redskins (2007)*; Utah Blaze (2008); Washington Redskins (2009)*; Spokane Shock (2010); Utah Blaze (2010)
- * Offseason or practice squad member only
- Stats at ArenaFan.com

Vaka Manupuna (born June 30, 1982) is an American former football defensive tackle. He was signed by the Washington Redskins as an undrafted free agent in 2006. He played college football at Colorado.

Manupuna was also a member of the New York Jets and Utah Blaze.

== Early life ==
As a senior, Manupuna earned first-team all-state honors from both the Honolulu Advertiser and Star-Bulletin for St. Louis School in Honolulu, Hawaii. SuperPrep named him to its All-Far West team, ranked as the No. 72 player overall in the region, and he also earned first-team all-Interscholastic League of Honolulu (ILH) honors for a second straight year. As a senior, he registered 37 solo tackles (about 60 overall), with four fumble recoveries, three forced fumbles and three quarterback sacks.

== College career ==
Manupuna played college football at the University of Colorado and started in all 13 games as a senior, including the Champs Sports Bowl. He enjoyed his best season as a senior where he earned honorable mention All-Big 12 Conference honors from both the Associated Press and the league coaches. Manupuna had 52 total tackles on his senior season (28 solo), including four for losses, five third down stops, seven quarterback hurries, two fumble recoveries and two pass breakups.

== Professional career ==
=== Washington Redskins (first stint) ===
Manupuna was signed by the Washington Redskins of the National Football League as a free agent in 2006 and spent part of the season on the practice squad.

=== New York Jets ===
Manupuna was signed to the practice squad of the New York Jets on December 20, 2006, only to be released on December 27.

=== Washington Redskins (second stint) ===
Manupuna was re-signed to a future contract by the Redskins. He was released on May 15, re-signed on August 2 and released again on August 13.

=== Utah Blaze ===
Manupuna played for the Utah Blaze of the Arena Football League in 2008, recording 16 tackles and 2.5 sacks.

=== Washington Redskins (third stint) ===
Manupuna was re-signed by the Redskins on May 1, 2009. He was waived on August 4, 2009.

=== Spokane Shock ===
Manupuna signed with the Spokane Shock of the newly reformed Arena Football League.

=== Rugby league ===
He has been named in the United States national rugby league team 22 man squad for the 2010 Atlantic Cup.
