= Canada national rugby team =

Canada national rugby team may refer to:

- Canada national rugby league team, represents Canada at rugby league, nicknamed the Wolverines
- Canada national rugby union team, represents Canada at rugby union, nicknamed the Canucks
