= 2021 Men's Rugby League World Cup qualification =

2021 World Cup qualification
Tournament details
- Dates: June 2018 – November 2019
- Teams: 20 (from 4 confederations)

The 2021 Men's Rugby League World Cup qualification was the qualifying process which will decide the 8 teams that would join the 8 quarter-finalists from the 2017 World Cup including the hosts England, who received an automatic spot, at the 2021 Rugby League World Cup. The process commenced in June 2018, with the commencement of the 2018–19 Rugby League European Championship C tournament, which acted as the first round for European qualification.

== Background ==
In October 2016, England was announced as the host the tournament, granting them automatic qualification.

In March 2017, the RLIF confirmed that the 8 quarter-finalists from the 2017 World Cup would receive automatic qualification to the 2021 tournament, along with details of how many slots each region will be allocated: "Seven teams will be qualified from Europe, six from the Asia-Pacific, two from the Americas, and one from a play-off series hosted in Middle East/Africa." Because Lebanon gained automatic qualification, a repechage play-off between the 2nd placed Middle East/Africa team (behind Lebanon), 2nd placed Americas team (behind the Americas qualifying team), and the 7th placed Asia-Pacific team (behind the 6 auto qualifiers) will take place instead of qualifying 2 Americas teams.

The RLIF requires participating nations to hold full or affiliate level membership. The Netherlands are the only such nation that opted to not participate.

== Qualified teams ==
Team	Method of qualification	Date of qualification	Total times qualified	Last time qualified	Current consecutive appearances	Previous best performance
England	Hosts	27 October 2016	7 (Note: Competed as part of Great Britain in nine previous tournaments, finishing as champions on three occasions (1954, 1960, 1972). The squads largely consisted of English players, but also featured Welsh players in every tournament. Scotland (1954, 1968, 1977, 1989–92) and Ireland (1957) were represented by native-born players in some tournaments.)	2017	7	Runners-up (1975, 1995, 2017)
Fiji	2017 Group D winners	10 November 2017	6	2017	6	Semi-finals (2008, 2013, 2017)
Tonga	2017 Group B winners	11 November 2017	6	2017	6	Semi-finals (2017)
New Zealand	2017 Group B runners-up	11 November 2017	16	2017	16	Winners (2008)
Samoa	2017 Group B third place	11 November 2017	6	2017	6	Quarter-finals (2000, 2013, 2017)
Australia	2017 Group A winners	11 November 2017	16	2017	16	Winners (11 times)
Lebanon	2017 Group A third place	11 November 2017	3	2017	2	Quarter-finals (2017)
Papua New Guinea	2017 Group C winners	12 November 2017	8	2017	8	Quarter-finals (2000, 2017)
France	Europe second round winners	11 November 2018	16	2017	16	Runners-up (1954, 1968)
Wales	Europe second round runners-up	11 November 2018	6	2017	3	Semi-finals (1995, 2000)
Jamaica	Americas Championship winners	17 November 2018	1	–	1	–
Ireland	Europe third round Group A winners	9 November 2019	5	2017	5	Quarter-finals (2000, 2008)
Italy	Europe third round Group A runners-up	9 November 2019	3	2017	3	Group stage (2013, 2017)
Scotland	Europe third round Group B winners	9 November 2019	5	2017	5	Quarter-finals (2013)
Greece	Europe third round Group B runners-up	9 November 2019	1	–	1	–
Cook Islands	Inter-regional repechage winners	16 November 2019	3	2013	1	Group stage (2000, 2013)

== Europe ==
England were the only European team to have been guaranteed qualification as they are hosting the tournament. France, Ireland, Italy, Scotland, and Wales all failed to reach the quarter finals of the 2017 World Cup. With the World Cup expanding to 16 teams in 2021, one extra European slot was available in comparison to the 2017 tournament.

The qualification structure is as follows:

- First round: 4 teams, who are the top-ranked teams in Europe excluding England, play in round-robin matches for the 2018 European Championship. The winners and runners-up qualify for the World Cup, with third and fourth place advancing to the third round.
- Second round: 6 teams divided into two pools of three teams play round-robin matches with the winners and runners-up of each pool qualifying for the World Cup.

=== First round ===
The 2018 European Championship acted as the first round of European qualification for the 2021 World Cup and automatically qualified 2 teams to the World Cup; France and Wales. The bottom two nations; Ireland and Scotland, became the top seeds in the third round.

Pos	Team	Pld	W	D	L	PF	PA	PD	Pts	Qualification
1	France	3	3	0	0	106	38	+68	6	Qualification for 2021 Rugby League World Cup
2	Wales	3	2	0	1	108	74	+34	4	Qualification for 2021 Rugby League World Cup
3	Ireland	3	1	0	2	54	74	−20	2	Advance to Europe Repêchage for 2021 World Cup qualification
4	Scotland	3	0	0	3	32	114	−82	0	Advance to Europe Repêchage for 2021 World Cup qualification

Source: ERL

27 October 2018
14:00 IST (UTC+01:00)

Ireland	36−10	Scotland
Tries: Higginson (2), Bentley, McCarthy, McMahon, O'Donnell, Ryan; Goals: Finn (4/7)	Report	Tries: Glohe, Kavangh; Goals: Brierley (1/2)

Morton Stadium, Santry
Attendance: 200
Referee: Tom Grant (England)

27 October 2018
18:00 CEST (UTC+02:00)

France	54–18	Wales
Tries: Escaré (2), Marcon (2), Ader, Curran, Gigot, Miloudi, Navarette; Goals: Gigot (7/8), Albert (1/1), Curran (1/1)	Report	Tries: Kear, Olds, Ralph; Goals: Olds (3/3)

Stade Albert Domec, Carcassonne
Attendance: 4,055
Referee: James Child (England)

2 November 2018
19:30 GMT (UTC+00:00)

Scotland	12–50	Wales
Tries: Bell, Dixon; Goals: Brierley (2/2)	Report	Tries: Williams (3), Jenkins (2), Ralph (2), Butler, Evans; Goals: Olds (7/9)

Netherdale, Galashiels
Attendance: 250
Referee: Ben Casty (France)

3 November 2018
14:00 GMT (UTC+00:00)

Ireland	10–24	France
Tries: McNally, Ryan; Goals: Finn (1/2)	Report	Tries: De Costa (2), Ader, Marcon; Goals: Gigot (4/5)

Morton Stadium, Santry
Attendance: 250
Referee: Scott Mikalauskas (England)

10 November 2018
18:00 CET (UTC+01:00)

France	28–10	Scotland
Tries: Escaré (2), Fages, Marion; Goals: Escaré (6/6)	Report	Tries: Dixon, Robertson; Goals: Brierley (0/1), Thomas (1/1)

Stade Albert Domec, Carcassonne
Attendance: 2,854
Referee: Greg Dolan (England)

11 November 2018
15:00 GMT (UTC+00:00)

Wales	40–8	Ireland
Tries: Bennion, Butler, Evans, Lloyd, Ralph, Williams; Goals: Olds (8/10)	Report	Tries: Grix, King; Goals: Finn (0/2)

Racecourse Ground, Wrexham
Attendance: 1,257
Referee: Gareth Hewer (England)

=== Second round ===
The second round of European qualification allowed four of the six teams to advance to the World Cup. It was scheduled for October and November 2019 and consisted of Ireland, Scotland, Serbia (Note: Russia were the winners of the European Qualifying B tournament but withdrew from the play-offs in August 2019 to be replaced by Serbia.), Spain, Greece and Italy. The six teams were split into two round-robin pools. The winners and runner-up in each pool qualified for the 2021 World Cup. There was no European qualification to the intercontinental play-off. The qualifiers were Ireland and Italy from Pool A and Scotland and Greece from Pool B.

Pool A

Pos	Team	Pld	W	D	L	PF	PA	PD	Pts	Qualification
1	Ireland	2	2	0	0	67	12	+55	4	Qualification for 2021 Rugby League World Cup
2	Italy	2	1	0	1	38	29	+9	2	Qualification for 2021 Rugby League World Cup
3	Spain	2	0	0	2	12	76	−64	0	

Source: ERL

26 October 2019
17:00 CEST (UTC+02:00)

Spain	8–42	Ireland
Tries: R. Franco; Goals: Pallares (2/2)	Report	Tries: McCarthy (2), Bentley, Keyes, McNally, Podesta, Roberts; Goals: Podesta (7/7)

Ciutat de l'Esport, Xàtiva
Attendance: 1,013
Referee: Geoffrey Poumes (France)
Touch judges: Ludovic Bernard (France), Alexandre Guedes (France)

2 November 2019
16:00 CET (UTC+01:00)

Italy	34–4	Spain
Tries: Passera (2), Campagnolo, King, Santi, Tramontana; Goals: Campagnolo (5/7)	Report	Tries: L. Franco; Goals: Pallares (0/1)

Stadio G. Teghil, Lignano Sabbiadoro
Referee: Benjamin Casty (France)
Touch judges: Jaroslav Bžoch (Czech Republic), Geoffrey Poumes (France)

9 November 2019
19:00 IST (UTC+01:00)

Ireland	25–4	Italy
Tries: Moran (2), McNally, King; Goals: Podesta (4/4); Drop goals: Keyes	Report	Tries: Tramontana; Goals: Campagnolo (0/1)

Morton Stadium, Santry
Referee: Liam Moore (England)
Touch judges: Gareth Jones (England), Andy Smith (England)

Pool B

Pos	Team	Pld	W	D	L	PF	PA	PD	Pts	Qualification
1	Scotland	2	2	0	0	128	24	+104	4	Qualification for 2021 Rugby League World Cup
2	Greece	2	1	0	1	106	48	+58	2	Qualification for 2021 Rugby League World Cup
3	Serbia	2	0	0	2	6	168	−162	0	

Source: ERL

26 October 2019
15:00 BST (UTC+01:00)

Scotland	86–0	Serbia
Tries: Oakes (3), Scott (3), Brierley (2), Alex Walker (2), Glohe, Hellewell, Kavanagh, McLelland, Turland; Goals: Brierley (13/15)	Report

Lochinch Sports Pavilion, Glasgow
Attendance: 300
Referee: Tom Grant (England)
Touch judges: Dean Bowmer (England), Jack Smith (England)

1 November 2019
20:20 GMT (UTC+00:00)

Greece	24–42	Scotland
Tries: Kambos, Mamouzelos, Tuliatu, Zampetides; Goals: Meads (4/4)	Report	Tries: Kavanagh (2), McLelland (2), Brierley, Douglas, Oakes, Scott; Goals: Brierley (2/6), Thomas (2/2), Douglas (1/1)

New River Stadium, London
Attendance: 350
Referee: James Child (England)
Touch judges: Peter Brooke (England), Matt Rossleigh (England)

9 November 2019
13:00 CET (UTC+01:00)

Serbia	6–82	Greece
Tries: Mirčeski; Goals: Zogović (1/1)	Report	Tries: Robinson (3), Bosmos (2), Meads (2), Mitsias (2), Constantinou, Dardamanis, Kambos, Magoulias, Mamouzelos, Mougios, G. Tsikrikas; Goals: Meads (9)

Makiš Stadium, Belgrade
Attendance: 180
Referee: Robert Hicks (England)
Touch judges: Denys Cherniev (Ukraine), Andrew Pilkington (Spain)

== Americas ==
The Americas group comprised four teams and was played as a single elimination knock-out tournament. Jamaica won the group beating Canada in the first round and then United States in the final. United States qualified for the intercontinental play-off by finishing as the runner-up of the tournament.

Semi-finals
Canada	8
Jamaica	38
United States	62
Chile	0

Final
United States	10
Jamaica	16

First semi-final

13 November 2018
17:30 EDT (UTC−04:00)

Canada	8–38	Jamaica
Tries: Borggren, McGoff	Report	Tries: B. Jones-Bishop (2), A. Brown, Bryan, Golding, Magrin, Thomas; Goals: Coleman (5/7)

Hodges Stadium, Jacksonville
Referee: Ben Thaler (England)

Second semi-final

13 November 2018
20:00 EDT (UTC−04:00)

United States	62–0	Chile
Tries: Anderson (4), Burroughs (3), Faraimo (2), Offerdahl (2), Donehue, Howard; Goals: Faraimo (5/13)	Report

Hodges Stadium, Jacksonville
Referee: Geoffrey Poumes (France)

Championship final

17 November 2018
16:00 EDT (UTC−04:00)

United States	10–16	Jamaica
Tries: Burroughs, Donehue; Goals: Faraimo (1/2)	Report	Tries: Ogden, Farrell; Goals: Coleman (4/6)

Hodges Stadium, Jacksonville
Referee: Ben Thaler (England)

== Inter-regional Repechage ==
The intercontinental play-off consisted of the Americas championship runner up (United States), 7th highest ranked Asia-Pacific team (Cook Islands), and the 2nd highest ranked Middle East-Africa team (South Africa). Cook Islands played South Africa in a preliminary match, which Cook Islands won. They then defeated the United States in the final play-off match, clinching the final place at the World Cup.

Play-off qualifier		Play-off
		United States	16
Cook Islands	66	Cook Islands	38
South Africa	6

Play-off qualifier

21 June 2019
19:00 AEST (UTC+10:00)

Cook Islands	66–6	South Africa
Tries: Ulberg (3), Niukore (2), R. Rennie (2), Dargan, E. Noovao, Puna, V. Rennie, Teroi; Goals: Marsters (9/12)		Tries: Turner; Goals: Cryer (1/1)

Ringrose Park, Sydney
Attendance: 2,621
Referee: Peter Gough (Australia)
Touch judges: Adam Cassidy (Australia), Darian Furner (Australia)
Player of the Match: Vincent Rennie (Cook Islands)

Team details

FB	1	Kayal Iro
WG	2	Paul Ulberg
CE	3	Marata Niukore
CE	4	Reubenn Rennie
WG	5	Steven Marsters
FE	6	Brad Takairangi (c)
HB	7	Troy Dargan
PR	8	Sam Mataora
HK	9	Aaron Teroi
PR	10	Tepai Moeroa
SR	14	Vincent Rennie
SR	12	Reuben Porter
LK	13	Pride Petterson-Robati
Interchange:
BE	11	Brody Tamarua
BE	15	Eli Noovao
BE	16	Moses Noovao-McGreal
BE	17	John Puna
Coach:
Tony Iro

FB	1	Will Smith Jnr
WG	2	Keegan Turner
CE	3	Byron Hutchinson
CE	4	Esje Esterhuizen
WG	5	Darren O'Donovan
FE	6	Bevan De Vries
HB	7	Kam Cryer (c)
PR	8	Joel Tubbs
HK	9	Edward Proudler
PR	10	Ashley Bull
SR	11	Shane Gillham (c)
SR	12	Ayden Perry
LK	13	Jonathan Soares
Interchange:
BE	14	Jason King
BE	15	Seth Buckley
BE	18	Louis Musson
BE	20	Allan Kasselman
Coach:
Jon Wilson

Play-off

16 November 2019
17:00 ET (UTC−04:00)

United States	16–38	Cook Islands
Tries: Faraimo, Howard, Shipway; Goals: Faraimo (2/3)	Report	Tries: Dargan (2), Arona, Gelling, Glenn, R. Rennie, V. Rennie; Goals: Marsters (5/7)

Hodges Stadium, Jacksonville
Attendance: 150
Referee: Scott Mikalauskas (England)
Touch judges: Peter Tapper (Jamaica), Kemoy White (Jamaica)

Team details

FB	1	Corey Makelim
WG	2	Ryan Burroughs
CE	3	Bureta Faraimo
CE	4	Elijah Ieriko
WG	5	Jamil Robinson
FE	6	Rory Humphreys
HB	7	Connor Donehue
PR	14	Mark Offerdahl (c)
HK	9	Kristian Freed
PR	15	Sonny Pettybourne
SR	11	Matt Shipway
SR	12	Daniel Howard
LK	13	Eddy Pettybourne
Interchange:
BE	10	Tim Stubbs
BE	17	Joe Eichner
BE	18	Charlie Jones
BE	19	Kevin Reed Jr
Coach:
Sean Rutgerson

FB	1	Kayal Iro
WG	2	Paul Ulberg
CE	3	Reubenn Rennie
CE	4	Anthony Gelling
WG	5	Steven Marsters
FE	6	Brad Takairangi
HB	7	Troy Dargan
PR	8	Sam Mataora
HK	9	Aaron Teroi
PR	10	Vincent Rennie
SR	11	Alex Glenn (c)
SR	12	Marata Niukore
LK	13	Dominique Peyroux (yellow card)
Interchange:
BE	14	Moses Noovao-McGreal
BE	15	Adam Tangata
BE	16	Uiti Baker
BE	17	Tevin Arona
Coach:
Tony Iro
