= Apple Pope =

American rugby league player

Apple Joe Pope is an American rugby league player who currently plays for the United States national team. He has also played for the Jacksonville Axemen. His position is hooker.

== Career ==
Pope was born in Yulee, Florida, near Jacksonville. He is a registered nurse by profession. He began his rugby league career in the Jacksonville Axemen's inaugural season in 2006. His brother Taco Pope has also played for the Axemen and the United States rugby league team.

Pope made his debut on the national team at the Rugby League Atlantic Cup in 2009. He was named team captain for the 2010 Atlantic Cup, leading the team to victory, and was named player of the game.

In 2010 he went to Australia to attend training camps, and was named to the trial team of the Tweed Heads Seagulls.

On November 3, 2011, The annual RLIF Awards dinner was held at the Tower of London and Pope was named the United States player of the year.
