= Adam Woolnough =

Australian rugby league footballer

Personal information
- Full name: Adam Woolnough
- Born: 24 May 1982 (age 44) Taree, New South Wales, Australia
- Height: 188 cm (6 ft 2 in)
- Weight: 106 kg (16 st 10 lb)

Playing information
- Position: Prop
Club
Years	Team	Pld	T	G	FG	P
2002–07	Newcastle Knights	117	11	0	0	44
2008–09	Penrith Panthers	17	1	0	0	4
2011	Melbourne Storm	21	0	0	0	0
	Total	155	12	0	0	48
Representative
Years	Team	Pld	T	G	FG	P
2006	Prime Minister's XIII	1	0	0	0	0

Coaching information
Representative
Years	Team	Gms	W	D	L	W%
2025–	United States	2	1	0	1	50
- Source: As of 22 November 2026

Adam Woolnough (born 24 May 1982) is an Australian former professional rugby league footballer. Woolnough played as a prop for nine seasons at the Melbourne Storm, Penrith Panthers and the Newcastle Knights in the NRL.

== Background ==
Woolnough was born in Taree, New South Wales, Australia. He was educated at Taree High School and was 1999 Australian Schoolboys representative.

== Playing career ==
Woolnough made his debut in 2002 for his junior club Newcastle Knights. This game was against New Zealand Warriors on 17 May coincidentally his mother's birth date. After six seasons (including one as captain) and 117 games, Woolnough made the decision to leave and head to the Penrith Panthers on a 3-year deal.

After two injury and form ravaged seasons, the 2009 NRL season was supposed to be his last. Woolnough announced his retirement on 19 August 2009, effective of his final 2009 NRL game, which was against his old club Newcastle Knights in Round 26, 2009. However, after a year out travelling with his partner, Woolnough returned to the NRL in 2011. This was made possible by a chance meeting with former teammate, Clint Newton in the UK. Newton was playing for Hull Kingston Rovers, when the conversation turned to the Melbourne Storm. From this conversation, Woolnough spoke with Melbourne head coach Craig Bellamy, about the possibility of joining Melbourne for the 2011 NRL season. Woolnough later signed in July 2010 at a Paris hotel, but was encouraged to complete his trip before reporting to training in October 2010.

== Post NRL career ==
Upon retirement, Woolnough worked in the underground coal mines near Newcastle, and played some local rugby league with Lakes United, he has worked in high performance programs in the Australian Institute of Sport and Queensland Academy of Sport. He has also served as General Manager for Ice Hockey Australia and is currently appointed coach of the United States national rugby league team.

== Career highlights ==
- First Grade Debut: 2002 - Round 10, Newcastle vs New Zealand Warriors at EnergyAustralia Stadium, 17 May
- 155 NRL games over 9 seasons with Newcastle Knights, Penrith Panthers, Melbourne Storm.
- Member of Prime Minister's XIII team to tour PNG in 2006.
