= Colonial Cup (rugby league) =

International rugby league challenge match

- Sport: Rugby league
- Instituted: 2010
- Number of teams: 2
- Region: International (RLIF)
- Holders: United States (2017)
- Most titles: United States (6 titles)
- Related competition: Americas Rugby League Championship

The Colonial Cup is an international rugby league football challenge match played between the United States Tomahawks and the Canada Wolverines. The inaugural match was played in September 2010 at the Richardson Memorial Stadium at Queen's University in Kingston, Ontario. The USA Tomahawks won 22–16.

In 2011 the Colonial Cup was expanded to a 'home and away' series. Each team won their home fixture. The U.S. won the first game 18–2 with Canada securing their first win in the second match with an 18–16 victory. The U.S. won the series by an aggregate score of 34–20. In 2012, the Cup was again contested over two games, with the USA Tomahawks winning both matchups. In 2013 the series expanded to four matches. In 2014 Canada won their first ever Colonial Cup trophy.

== Results ==
Note that in a year where each team wins an even number of games, the winner of the cup is decided by aggregate scores.

Year	Winner of Cup	Wins	Losses	Drawn
2010	United States	1	0	0
2011	United States	1	1	0
2012	United States	2	0	0
2013	United States	3	1	0
2014	Canada	1	0	0
2015	Canada	2	1	0
2016	United States	2	0	0
2017	United States	1	0	0
2024	Draw	0	0	1

== 2010 Colonial Cup ==
19 September 2010

Canada	16 – 22	United States
Tries: Dave Burton; Danny Tupou; Jamie Lester; Goals: Adam Moody (2)	Report	Tries: Larry Madden; Mike Cartwright; Jared Frymoyer; Goals: Derrick Roma (3); Marcus Vassilakopoulos (2)

George Taylor Richardson Memorial Stadium, Kingston, Ontario
Attendance: 400
Referee: Paul Byrne

== 2011 Colonial Cup ==
=== Game 1 ===
27 August 2011

United States	18 – 2	Canada
Tries: Salesi Tongamoa; Sean Taylor; Fitz-James Adams; Goals::Michael Garvey (3/4)	Report	Goals: Matt Pettie 1/1

Garthwaite Stadium, Philadelphia

=== Game 2 ===
18 September 2011

Canada	18 – 16	United States
Tries: Geoff Bylund '3; Tony Felix '20; Robin Legault '38; Danny Tupou '60; Goals: Louis Robinson (1/5)	Report	Tries: Louis Tulio '27; Michael Garvey '73; Ian Elliott '75; Goals: Garvey (2/3)

Fletcher's Fields, Markham, Ontario
Attendance: 2,000

== 2012 Colonial Cup ==
=== Game 1 ===
8 September
19:00 (local time)

Canada	24 – 28	United States
	Report

Lamport Stadium, Toronto
Attendance: 4,675

=== Game 2 ===
23 September

United States	36 – 14	Canada
Tries: Damien O'Malveny (2); Dustin Umeda (2); Curtis Cunz; Louis Tulio; Goals: Todd Fisher (5)'; Matt Walsh	Report	Tries: Christian Miller; Louis Robinson; Goals: Louis Robinson (3)

Staples High School, Fairfield, Connecticut

== 2013 Colonial Cup ==
=== Game 1 ===
Saturday, 6 July
19:00 (local time)

Canada	36 – 20	United States
Tries: Tony Felix (2); Joe Bangay; Christian Miller; Geoff Bylund; Robin Legault; Adam Timler; Goals: Steve Piatek (4/7)	Report, Video	Tries: Ben Sadgrove; Craig Priestly; Mike Schacter; Taylor Welch Goals: Craig Priestly (2/4)

Lamport Stadium, Toronto
Attendance: 7,168
Referee: (England) Paul Byrne
Player of the Match: (Canada) Tony Felix

=== Game 2 ===
Saturday, 24 August
18:00 (local time)

United States	44 – 16	Canada
Tries: Val Notoa 2' c M. Schachter 14' c Kristian Freed 26' c Mark Offerdahl 33' m Luke Collins 48' c Craig Priestly 53' c Matt Walsh 73' c Gareth Gibbs 78' m Goals: Craig Priestly (6/8) 3', 15', 28', 49', 54', 74'	Report	Tries: Don Mackinlay 10' c Graham Dobbs 44' m Chris Diamond 58' c Goals: Robin Legault (2/3) 11', 59'

Garthwaite Stadium, Conshohocken, Pennsylvania
Attendance: 175
Referee: (United States) Robin Peers
Player of the Match: (United States) Kristian Freed

=== Game 3 ===
Saturday, 7 September
19:00 (local time)

Canada	20 – 28	United States
Tries: Louis Robinson; Ben Fleming; Christian Miller; Robin Legault; Goals: Robin Legault (2/4)	Report Video	Tries: Louis Tuilo (2); Brent Shorten (2); Casey Clarke; Mike Schacter; Goals: Craig Priestly (4/6)

Lamport Stadium, Toronto
Attendance: 3,128
Referee: ?
Player of the Match: (United States) Taylor Welch

=== Game 4 ===
Saturday, 28 September
19:00 (local time)

Canada	22 – 30	United States
Tries: Jaime Beeton; Christian Miller; Eric Moyer; Brent King; Goals: Jaime Beeton (3/5)	Report Video	Tries: Gabriel Farley; Brent Shorten (3); Gareth Gibbs; Mike Schacter; Goals: Craig Priestly (3/6)

Lamport Stadium, Toronto
Attendance: 5,176
Referee: (England) Paul Byrne
Player of the Match: (United States) Taylor Welch

== 2014 Colonial Cup ==
Sunday, 10 August
19:00 (local time)

Canada	52 – 14	United States
Tries: Billy Skidgmore; Jonathan Cregg (2); Enoch Wamalwa (2); Tom Clancy; Denny McCarthy; Matt Wyles; Brett King; Goals: Steve Piatek (8/9)	Report	Tries: Arber Corbaj; Matt Walsh; CJ Catalano Goals: Matt Walsh (1/3)

Lamport Stadium, Toronto
Attendance: 7,356
Referee: (England) Paul Byrne
Player of the Match: (Canada) Steve Piatek

== 2015 Colonial Cup ==
=== Game 1 ===
Sunday, 20 September
13:00 (local time)

United States	28 – 36	Canada
Tries: Taylor Alley (2); Casey Clark; Ryan Burroughs; Kenny Britt; Goals: Matt Walsh (4/5)	Report	Tries: Alan Lafferty; Christian Miller; Jonathan Cregg; Trent Bourke; Enoch Wamalwa; Antoine Blanc; Goals: Steve Piatek (6/6)

*Garthwaite Stadium, Conshohocken, Pennsylvania
Referee: (United States) Vince Lawson

(*Was initially set to be held at Canada's Lamport Stadium in Toronto on 19 September)

FB	1	Kenny Britt
RW	2	Rodrigus Ceasar
RC	3	Ryan Burroughs
LC	4	Taylor Alley
LW	5	David Aguilar
SO	6	Rich Henson
SH	7	Matt Walsh
PR	8	Andrew Kneisly
HK	9	Gareth Walker
PR	10	Marcos Flegmann
SR	11	Jonathon Purnell
SR	12	Casey Clark
LF	13	Kevin Wiggins
Substitutions:
IC	14	Nick Newlin
IC	15	Terrance Williams
IC	16	Curtis Goddard
IC	17	Abe Cohen
Coach:
Peter Illfield

FB	1	Robin Legault
RW	2	Trent Bourke
RC	3	Jonathan Cregg
LC	4	Christian Miller
LW	5	Billy Gemmell
SO	6	Matt Wyles
SH	7	Steve Piatek
PR	8	Jason Locke
HK	9	Alan Lafferty
PR	10	Antoine Blanc
SR	11	Denny McCarthy
SR	12	Erick Alvarado
LF	13	Max Smillie
Substitutions:
IC	14	Eddie Billborough
IC	15	Joey Murphy
IC	16	JT Rowbotham
IC	17	Enoch Wamalwa
Coach:
Jamie Lester

=== Game 2 ===
Sunday, 18 October
15:00 (local time)

United States	28 – 34	Canada
Tries: Roman Lowery (3); Ryan Burroughs (2); Goals: Mike Timpano (4/6)	Report	Tries: Eddie Billborough (3); Steve Piatek; Matt Wyles; Enoch Wamalwa; Goals: Steve Piatek (6/6)

Garthwaite Stadium, Conshohocken, Pennsylvania

FB	1	Ryan Burrows
RW	2	Jared Frymoyer
RC	3	Taylor Alley
LC	4	Luke Barron
LW	5	Mike Timpano
SO	6	Rich Henson
SH	7	Shain Singleton
PR	8	Andrew Kneisley
HK	9	Gareth Walker
PR	10	Kevin Wiggins
SR	11	Abe Cohen
SR	12	Casey Clark
LF	13	Jon Purnell
Substitutions:
IC	14	Terrance Williams
IC	15	Roman Lowery
IC	16	Bart Longchamp
IC	17	Zack Reichenbach
Coach:
Peter Illfield

FB	1	Robin Legault
RW	2	Tony Felix
RC	3	Jonathan Cregg
LC	4	Eddie Billborough
LW	5	Billy Gemmell
SO	6	Matt Wyles
SH	7	Steve Piatek
PR	8	Enoch Wamalwa
HK	9	Alan Lafferty
PR	10	Antoine Blanc
SR	11	Alex Boyd
SR	12	Christian Miller
LF	13	Jamie Kelly
Substitutions:
IC	14	Denny McCarthy
IC	15	Eric Moyer
IC	16	JT Rowbotham
IC	17	Lawrence Ross
Coach:
Jamie Lester

=== Game 3 ===
12 December 2015

United States	34 – 24	Canada
Try: Alley (2) 2', 53'; Howden (2) '9, '44; D. Howard (3) 36', 58', 79'; Burroughs 63'; Goal: Howden (1/4)	Report	Try: Kelly 18'; Ryley Jacks (3) 32', 40', 66'; Goal: Piatek (4/4)

Hodges Stadium, Jacksonville
Referee: (England) Robert Hicks
Player of the Match: (United States) Mark Offerdahl

FB	1	Corey Makelim (red card) 32'
RW	23	Taylor Howden
RC	4	Taylor Alley
LC	3	Ryan Burroughs
LW	5	Roman Lowery
SO	6	Rich Henson
SH	7	Matt Walsh
PR	8	Nick Newlin
HK	2	Kristian Freed
PR	9	Mark Offerdahl (c)
SR	11	Daniel Howard
SR	12	Casey Clark
LF	21	Steve Howard
Substitutes:
IC	17	Jon Purnell
IC	16	Sam Carson
IC	15	Andrew Kneisly
IC	14	Luke Barron
Coach:
Brian McDermott

FB	1	Robin Legault
RW	2	Billy Gemmell
RC	3	Jonathan Cregg
LC	4	Rick Schouten
LW	5	Adam Timler
SO	6	Ryley Jacks
SH	7	Steve Piatek
PR	8	Tom Dempsey
HK	9	Rhys Jacks
PR	10	Louis Robinson
SR	11	Christian Miller
SR	12	Steve Bouchard
LF	13	Jamie Kelly
Substitutes:
IC	14	Matt Wyles
IC	15	Enoch Wamalwa
IC	16	Daniel Blasco-Morris
IC	17	Alex Boyd
Coach:
Aaron Zimmerle

(*Also played as part of 2017 Rugby League World Cup qualifying)

== 2016 Colonial Cup ==
=== Game 1 ===
Saturday, 24 September

Canada	8 – 14	United States
Tries: Akarika Dawn '13; Kevin Gurniak '64; Goals: Steve Piatek (0/2)	Report	Tries: Roman Lowrey '68; Gabriel Farley '75; Jon St John '79; Goals: Junior Vaivai (1/3)

Lamport Stadium, Toronto

- Also played as part of 2016 America's Cup

=== Game 2 ===
Saturday, 1 October

United States	20 – 14	Canada
Tries: Rich Henson '20; Casey Clark '35; Junior Vaivai '79; Goals: Junior Vaivai (4/4)	Report	Tries: Matt Wyles '16; Jon Cregg '61; Christian Miller '74; Goals: Joel O’Niell (1/2); Matt Wyles (0/1)

Eden Park, Wilmington, Delaware

== 2017 Colonial Cup ==
16 September 2017
19:00 EDT (UTC−04)

Canada	18 – 36	United States
Tries: Curry (2), Couzens; Goals: Ngawati (3/3)	Report	Tries: Faraimo (3), Alley (2), Johnston, Vaivai; Goals: Vaivai (3/6), Faraimo (1/1)

Lamport Stadium, Toronto
Attendance: 8,456
Referee: Rickii Monk

== 2024 Colonial Cup ==
16 March 2024
19:00 PDT (UTC−07)

United States	16 – 16	Canada
Tries: Ryan Burroughs; Jason Martin; Kyle Granby; Goals: Kyle Granby; Mason McCrory	Report	Tries: Colton Carpenter; Blake Mahovic; Scyler Dumas; Goals: Jacob Bourne (2)

Valley Hill High School, Las Vegas
Referee: (United States) Cody Kuxman

== See also ==
- Pacific Rugby League International
- Anzac Test
- Four Nations
- European Cup
- Rugby League World Cup
