= 2009 Atlantic Cup =

- Number of teams: 2
- Host country: United States
- Winner: United States
- Matches played: 1
- Attendance: 3,500 (3,500 per match)
- Points scored: 59 (59 per match)
- Tries scored: 10 (10 per match)
- Top scorer: (United States) Nate Smith (18)
- Top try scorer: (United States) Kei Misipeka (3)

The 2009 Atlantic Cup, known as the Hotels of Jacksonville Atlantic Cup for sponsorship purposes, was the first Atlantic Cup rugby league football tournament. It was held on November 14, 2009 at Hodges Stadium at the University of North Florida in Jacksonville, Florida. This inaugural contest was a single test between the United States and Jamaica. The event was deemed a success, and sponsors hoped the Atlantic Cup would become an annual event, with other developing rugby league nations such as South Africa and Japan competing. It was followed by the 2010 Atlantic Cup, which featured the United States, Jamaica, and Canada.

== Match ==
2009-11-14
1500 EDT / UTC -4

United States	37 – 22	Jamaica
Tries: Keiki Misipeka (3); Nate Smith (2); Michael Cartwright; Goals: Nate Smith (5); John Grace; Field Goals:Derrick Roma	Report	Tries: Wayne Rettie (2); Jamaine Wray; Michael Brown; Goals: Jamaine Wray (2); Danny Thomas

Hodges Stadium, Jacksonville, Florida, USA
Attendance: 3,500
Referee: Ben Thaler (England)
Player of the Match: Nate Smith

== Squads ==
United States 2009 Atlantic Cup squad
Squad		Standby Reserves	Coaching staff
Gareth Baxendale – New York Knights RLFC; Mike Brazill – Aston DSC Bulls; Michael Cartwright – New York Knights RLFC; Curtis Cunz – Connecticut Wildcats; Gene Giallombardo – Aston DSC Bulls; John Grace – Aston DSC Bulls; Bob Knoepfel – Jacksonville Axemen; Kea Misipeka – New Haven Warriors; Keikeokalani Misipeka – New Haven Warriors	Siose Muliumu – New Haven Warriors; Apple Pope – Jacksonville Axemen; Taco Pope – Jacksonville Axemen; Ewan Robinson – New Haven Warriors; Derrick Roma – New Haven Warriors; Nate Smith – Connecticut Wildcats; Sean Taylor – New York Knights RLFC; Louis Tulio – Aston DSC Bulls	Matt Clark – Jacksonville Axemen; Lance Gaines – Boston 13s	Head coach: David Niu; Assistant coaches: Marcus Vassilakopoulos; Jeff Preston; Rob Balachandran; Legend: (c) Captain(s); (vc) Vice-captain(s); Updated: 4 November 2009; Source(s): American Rugby News

Jamaica 2009 Atlantic Cup squad
Squad		Coaching staff
Joseph Brown – Gateshead Thunder; Michael Brown – Hunslet Hawks; Lamont Bryan – Harlequins RL; Carlye Burgher – Vauxhall Vultures; Roy Calvert – Duhaney Park Sharks; Damon Gayle – Duhaney Park Sharks; Brian Hutchinson – Vauxhall Vultures; Jason McFarlane – Jamaica Defence Force Warriors; Duane Nelson – Dudley Hill	Stephen Pryce (Player/Coach); Wayne Reittie – York City Knights; Duane Scott – Student Rugby League International; Jode Sheriffe – Featherstone Rovers; Orien Smith – Jamaica Defence Force Warriors; Daniel Thomas – Dudley Hill; Jamaine Wray – Keighley Cougars; Claude Yen – Vauxhall Vultures	Head coach: Dean Thomas; Assistant coach: Stephen Pryce; Legend: (c) Captain(s); (vc) Vice-captain(s); Updated: 11 November 2009; Source(s): American Rugby News
