= Ruairi McGoff =

Canada international rugby league footballer

Personal information
- Full name: Ruairi McGoff
- Born: 5 January 1985 (age 40)

Playing information
- Position: Prop
Club
Years	Team	Pld	T	G	FG	P
2010	Barrow Raiders	1
2010–11	Workington Town	35	2	0	0	8
2012–14	Barrow Raiders	22	2	0	0	4
2019–	Whitehaven	7	0	0	0	0
	Total	65	4	0	0	12
Representative
Years	Team	Pld	T	G	FG	P
2011–18	Canada	6	0	0	0	0

Ruairi McGoff (born 5 January 1985) is a professional rugby league footballer who has played in the 2010s. He has played at representative level for Canada, and at club level for Ulverston ARLFC, Barrow Raiders (two spells), Workington Town (two spells, including the first on loan in 2010), and Whitehaven, initially as a prop.

== Playing career ==
McGoff played for the Barrow Raiders before joining Workington Town on loan in 2010. He moved permanently to Workington Town in 2011 but re-signed for Barrow for the 2012 season. He made his international début for Canada against South Africa in 2011. In 2019 Gary Charlton signed him for Whitehaven and he was part of the team that won the 2019 League 1 title.
