= 2018 Americas Rugby League Championship =

2018 Americas Championship
- Number of teams: 4
- Host country: United States
- Winner: Jamaica
- Matches played: 4
- Points scored: 208 (52 per match)
- Tries scored: 39 (9.75 per match)
- Top scorer: (Canada) Ash Calvert (26)
- Top try scorer: (United States) Brandon Anderson (United States) Ryan Burroughs (4 tries each)

The 2018 Americas Rugby League Championship was held in Jacksonville, Florida, in November 2018. This tournament was the 3rd Americas Rugby League Championship and the 1st in which a South American national team participated. The tournament also acted as part of the 2021 Men's Rugby League World Cup qualifying. The winning team directly qualified for the 2021 Rugby League World Cup, while the runner-up will progress to the intercontinental repechage in 2019.

The winner of the tournament was Jamaica, with the United States moving on to the intercontinental repechage to be hosted in 2019.

== Squads ==
=== Canada ===
Shaun McKenzie, Rick Schouten (Abbotsford Griffins, Canada); Christian Miller, Jason Park (Brantford Broncos, Canada); Ash Calvert (Berowra Wallabies, Australia); Josh Kelly (Calgary Cowboys, Canada); Jack Couzens (Coastal Cougars, Canada); Brad Austin (Halswell Hornets, New Zealand); Louis Robinson (London Skolars, UK); Wes Black, Joel Hulett (Ourimbah Magpies, Australia); Rhys Jacks (Sunshine Coast Falcons, Australia); Eddie Bilborough, Antoine Blanc, Emil Borggren, Michael Mastroianni (Toronto City Saints, Canada); Jordan Drew (Townsville Blackhawks, Australia); Ruairi McGoff (Ulverston RL, UK); Sean McInroy (Unattached, Australia); Scyler Dumas, Andrew Porter (Vancouver Dragons, Canada)

=== Chile ===
Jonathan Espinoza (Balmoral RLFC), Iziah Catrileo, Bradley Millar, Trent Millar (Brothers Mustangs RLFC), Thomas Garrido, James Horvat (Corrimal Cougars RLFC), Eugene Araya, Chris Brantes, Patrick Camaano, Mana Castillo-Sioni, Nick Doberer, Jaden Laing, Jose Nitor-Alvear, Brandon Tobar (Latin Heat RLFC), Francisco Leiva (Maquinarias RLFC), Piero Diaz (Mariman RLFC), Taylor Salas (Ngen Mapu RLFC), Ferec Cavezas (Rhinos RLFC), Junior Sandoval (Sunbury Tigers RLFC), Zecil Yao (Toros RLFC), Eddie Wegener (West Belconnen Warriors RLFC)

=== Jamaica ===
Joel Farrell, Keenen Tomlinson, (Batley Bulldogs), Jonathan Magrin, Ross Peltier (Bradford Bulls) Daniel Thomas (Dewsbury Celtic) Jode Sheriffe (Dewsbury Rams) Aaron Jones-Bishop (Doncaster) Andrae McFarlane, Khamisi McKain, Marvin Thompson, Renaldo Wade (Duhaney Park), James Woodburn-Hall (Halifax ) Ashton Golding (Leeds Rhinos) Joseph Brown, Mo Agoro (Newcastle) Jacob Ogden (London Broncos) Jy-Mel Coleman, Lamont Bryan, Omari Caro (London Skolars), Ben Jones-Bishop (Wakefield), Alex Brown (Unattached)

=== United States ===
Nick Newlin (Atlanta Rhinos), Ryan Burroughs (Barrow Raiders), Brandon Anderson, Jamil Robinson, (Brooklyn Kings), Jerome Veve (Burleigh Bears), Haveatama “Joel” Luani (Canterbury-Bankstown Bulldogs), Chris Wiggins (Delaware Black Foxes), Bureta Faraimo (Hull FC), Kyle Grinold, David Washington (Jacksonville Axemen), Chris Frazier (NOVA Eagles), Curtis Goddard (Southwest Florida Copperheads), Andrew Kneisly (Philadelphia Fight), Cory Makelim, Mark Offerdahl (Sheffield Eagles), Connor Donehue (Sunshine Coast Falcons), Joe Eichner (Junee Diesels), Danny Howard (Wentworth Magpies), Kristian Freed (Wests Mitchelton)

== Bracket ==
Semi-finals
Canada	8
Jamaica	38
United States	62
Chile	0

Final
United States	10
Jamaica	16
Third place
Canada	62
Chile	12

== Fixtures ==
=== Semi-finals ===
First semi-final

13 November 2018
17:30 EDT (UTC−04:00)

Canada	8–38	Jamaica
Tries: Borggren, McGoff	Report	Tries: B. Jones-Bishop (2), A. Brown, Bryan, Golding, Magrin, Thomas; Goals: Coleman (5/7)

Hodges Stadium, Jacksonville
Referee: Ben Thaler (England)

Second semi-final

13 November 2018
20:00 EDT (UTC−04:00)

United States	62–0	Chile
Tries: Anderson (4), Burroughs (3), Faraimo (2), Offerdahl (2), Donehue, Howard; Goals: Faraimo (5/13)	Report

Hodges Stadium, Jacksonville
Referee: Geoffrey Poumes (France)

=== Play-offs ===
Third-place play-off

17 November 2018
13:30 EDT (UTC−04:00)

Canada	62–12	Chile
Tries: Calvert (2), Mastroianni (2), McInroy (2), Hulett, Jacks, McKenzie, Miller, Schouten; Goals: Calvert (9/11)	Report	Tries: Garrido (2); Goals: Horvat (2/2)

Hodges Stadium, Jacksonville
Referee: Geoffrey Poumes (France)

Championship final

17 November 2018
16:00 EDT (UTC−04:00)

United States	10–16	Jamaica
Tries: Burroughs, Donehue; Goals: Faraimo (1/2)	Report	Tries: Ogden, Farrell; Goals: Coleman (4/6)

Hodges Stadium, Jacksonville
Referee: Ben Thaler (England)
