= Michael Brown (rugby league) =

Australian rugby league footballer

Personal information
- Full name: Michael Brown
- Born: 12 August 1970 (age 54)

Playing information
- Position: Hooker
Club
Years	Team	Pld	T	G	FG	P
1990–96	Balmain Tigers	56	9	0	0	36
- Source: As of 13 January 2023

Michael Brown is an Australian former professional rugby league footballer who played in the 1990s. He played for Balmain in NSWRL/ARL competition.

== Playing career ==
Brown made his first grade debut for Balmain in round 7 of the 1990 NSWRL season against Newcastle at Leichhardt Oval. Brown played 56 games for Balmain during a difficult time in the clubs history where they finished with the Wooden Spoon in 1994 (only the fourth time since entering the competition in 1908) and also the team being briefly renamed the "Sydney Tigers" for two seasons and relocating to Parramatta Stadium for home matches. Brown's final game for the club was in round 10 of the 1996 ARL season against the Gold Coast Chargers.
