= Taylor Alley =

American rugby league player & coach

Personal information
- Full name: Jonathan Taylor Alley
- Born: Florida, United States
- Height: 5 ft 11 in (180 cm)
- Weight: 203 lb (92 kg)

Playing information
- Position: Second-row
Club
Years	Team	Pld	T	G	FG	P
	Central Florida Warriors
Representative
Years	Team	Pld	T	G	FG	P
2015–17	United States	7	11	0	0	44

Coaching information
Club
Years	Team	Gms	W	D	L	W%
	Central Florida Warriors
- Source: As of January 29, 2021

Jonathan Taylor Alley is an American rugby league player and coach for the Central Florida Warriors. He was selected to represent the United States in the 2017 Rugby League World Cup.

== Playing career ==
He has played for the Jacksonville Axemen and was part of their 2012 premiership winning side and also for the UNF (University of North Florida) Deadbirds rugby union team. He has played for the Narooma Devils in the Group 16 Rugby League on the New South Wales South Coast. He scored 2 tries for the United States in their 36-18 victory over Canada in October 2017.

He was selected to represent the United States in the 2017 Rugby League World Cup.
