= Hodges Stadium =

Multi-purpose stadium in Florida, US

Coordinates: 30°16′30.97″N 81°30′42.12″W

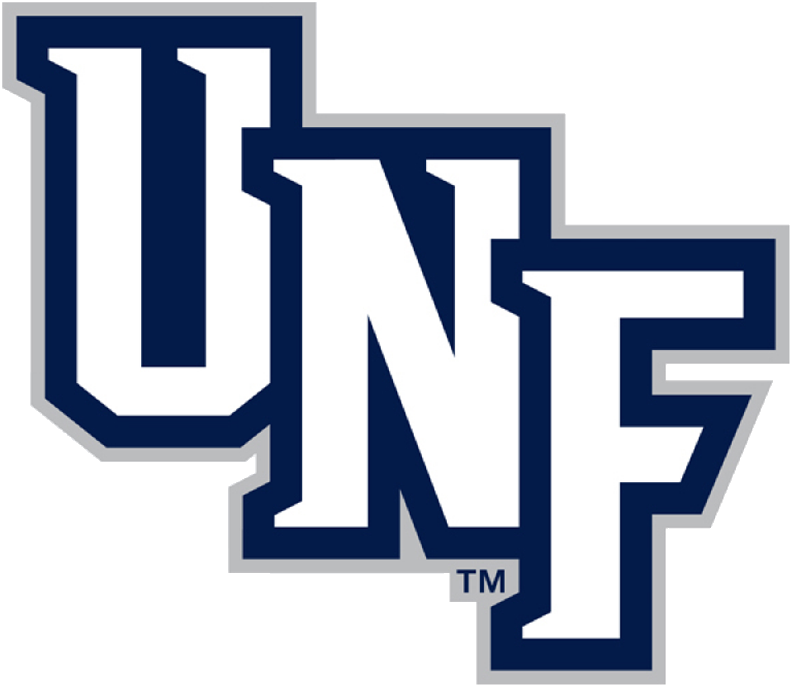

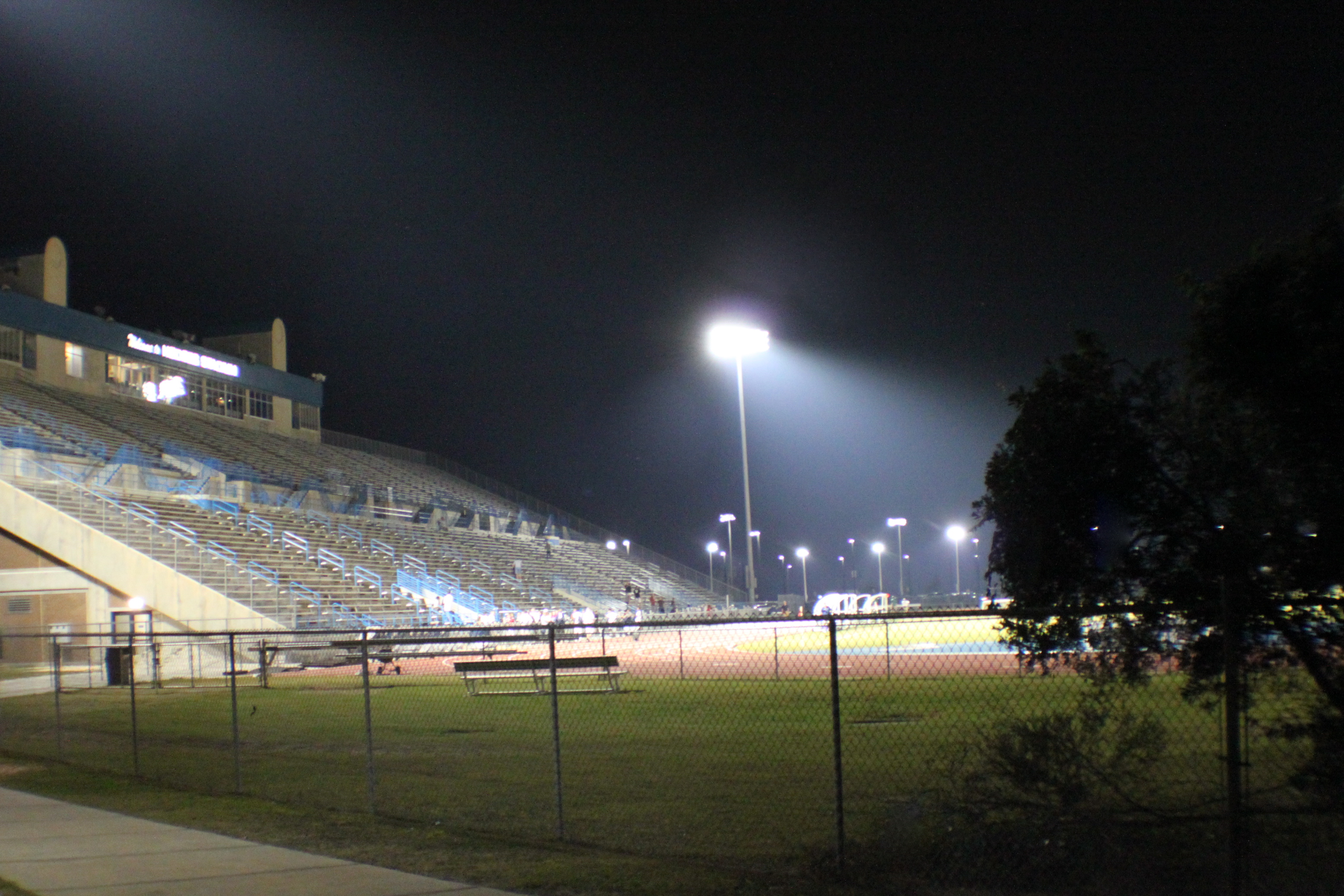
- Night view of the stadium in 2009
- Interactive map of Hodges Stadium
- Location: 1S U N F Drive Jacksonville, Florida 32224 (United States)
- Owner: University of North Florida
- Operator: UNF Athletics
- Capacity: 12,000
- Surface: Natural grass
- Current use: Soccer; Track and field Rugby

Construction
- Opened: 2004; 22 years ago
- Renovated: 2006; 2008

Tenants
- North Florida Ospreys (NCAA) teams: men's and women's soccer; men's and women's track and field; Professional teams: Jacksonville Axemen (USARL) (2006–present); Jacksonville Armada FC (NASL/NPSL) (2017–present); United States national rugby league team (2009–present); Sporting Club Jacksonville (USLS) (2025–present)

Website
- unfospreys.com/hodges-stadium

Hodges Stadium is a stadium at the University of North Florida (UNF), and the home field for the North Florida Ospreys soccer, track and field, and cross country teams. It is located on the university's campus in Jacksonville, Florida, U.S. It is named for George and Kernan Hodges, who donated $2 million to upgrade the facility in 2006.

In addition to its use by UNF the stadium has become a center for rugby league football, serving as home field for the Jacksonville Axemen of the USA Rugby League (USARL), and hosting several international matches and training camps. Sporting Club Jacksonville, a USL Super League (USLS) expansion team, begins play at the stadium in the 2025–26 season.

== History ==
The University of North Florida's field was first opened in 2004 in order to serve the North Florida Ospreys men's and women's soccer, cross country running, and track and field teams. In 2006 Jacksonville philanthropists George and Kernan Hodges issued a $2 million donation to UNF to improve the facility. The donation funded the construction of seats for 10,000, an eight-lane 400-meter track, a press box, lighting, and classrooms and offices. The nameless field was renamed Hodges Stadium after them. Other additions included the Browning Athletic Training and Education Center and a strength and conditioning center.

In 2008 the stadium underwent another renovation to install a new state-of-the art running track. The university spent another $3 million to complete the 9-lane Olympic-quality track. It was designed by the Italian company Mondo and was the third facility in the world to feature the company's Mondotrack SX rubber surface. It was built to meet National Collegiate Athletic Association (NCAA) and International Association of Athletics Federations (IAAF) standards, and is one of only seven facilities in the U.S. to be certified by the IAAF.

== Amenities ==
The 12,000-capacity stadium opened in 2004 with a capacity of 9,400 and underwent renovations in 2006 and 2008 that installed additional seating, a press box, and a 9-lane Olympic quality running track. The facility additionally includes classrooms, offices, and the Browning Athletic Training and Education Center. Following the completion of the current track, it became one of seven facilities in the U.S. certified by the International Association of Athletics Federations (IAAF), allowing it to host all NCAA and IAAF events within its grounds.

== Notable events ==
The stadium has held several international rugby league football matches and has hosted training camps for international teams. Academy Award-winning actor Russell Crowe visited UNF to organize for a club rugby league match to be played at Hodges Stadium. Crowe's South Sydney Rabbitohs played against the Leeds Rhinos on January 26, 2008, with 12,500 people in attendance. In 2009, the Leeds Rhinos returned to UNF to play the Salford City Reds in an exhibition game.

- February 2005 – Practice for the Philadelphia Eagles before Super Bowl XXXIX.
- April 2009 – UNF Rugby Football Club hosted their annual Alumni Game for the first time in the stadium.
- 2009 Atlantic Sun Conference Track and Field Championships
- December 19, 2009 – North America Bowl between Jacksonville Knights and Team Canada a traveling all-star team.
- July 23–26, 2015 – Hosted the USATF Masters Outdoor Track & Field Championships.
- July 27 – August 2, 2015 – Hosted the USATF National Junior Olympic Track & Field Championships.

== Rugby league matches ==
Date	Home	Final score	Away	Competition	Attendance	Ref.
26 January 2008	South Sydney Rabbitohs	24 – 26	Leeds Rhinos	Australia Day Challenge	12,500	
18 January 2009	Leeds Rhinos	12 – 10	Salford Red Devils	Exhibition		
14 November 2009	United States	37 – 22	Jamaica	2009 Atlantic Cup	3,500	
16 November 2010	United States	36 – 26	Jamaica	2010 Atlantic Cup	500	
18 November 2010	Jamaica	32 – 12	Canada	2010 Atlantic Cup	2,500	
20 November 2010	United States	46 – 12	Canada	2010 Atlantic Cup	2,800	
4 December 2015	United States	20 – 14	Jamaica	2017 RLWC qualifying		
12 December 2015	United States	34 – 24	Canada	2017 RLWC qualifying		
22 July 2017	United States	48 – 6	Jamaica	2017 Americas Rugby League Championship		
13 November 2018	Jamaica	38 – 8	Canada	2018 Americas Rugby League Championship		
13 November 2018	United States	62 – 0	Chile	2018 Americas Rugby League Championship		
17 November 2018	Canada	62 – 12	Chile	2018 Americas Rugby League Championship		
13 November 2018	United States	10 – 16	Jamaica	2018 Americas Rugby League Championship		
16 November 2019	United States	16 – 38	Cook Islands	2021 RLWC Repechage	150	

USA Tomahawks Record at the Hodges Stadium
Competition	Played	Won	Drawn	Lost	% Won
Americas Rugby League Championship	3	2	0	1	66.67%
Colonial Cup	3	3	0	0	100%
RLWC Qualifying	3	2	0	1	66.67%
Total	9	7	0	2	77.78%

Updated 24 April 2021
