= 2017 Americas Rugby League Championship =

Rugby league competition

2017 Americas Championship
- Number of teams: 3
- Host countries: United States; Canada
- Winner: United States
- Matches played: 3

The 2017 Americas Rugby League Championship was the second tri-nation rugby league competition between the national teams of the USA, Canada and Jamaica. The United States would defend its title with a clean sweep of the tournament just like in 2016.

== Results ==
22 July 2017

United States	48 – 6	Jamaica
	Report

Hodges Stadium, Jacksonville, Florida

26 August 2017

Jamaica	28 – 14	Canada
	Report

Mona Bowl, University of West Indies, Jamaica

16 September 2017

Canada	18 – 36	United States
Try:	Report (*Also played as part of 2017 Colonial Cup*)	Try:

Lamport Stadium, Toronto, Ontario (Canada)
