= Jamaica national rugby league team =

Jamaica

Team information
- Nickname: Reggae Warriors
- Governing body: Rugby League Jamaica
- Region: Americas
- Head coach: Jy-Mel Coleman
- Captain: Ashton Golding
- Most caps: Joe Brown (14)
- Top try-scorer: Wayne Reittie (6)
- Top point-scorer: Jymel Coleman (54)
- Home stadium: University of the West Indies
- IRL ranking: 19th

Uniforms
First colours

Team results
- First international
- United States 37–22 Jamaica (Jacksonville, Florida, US; 14 November 2009)
- Biggest win
- Jamaica 68–16 Ireland (Bray, Ireland; 16 October 2016)
- Biggest defeat
- New Zealand 68-6 Jamaica (MKM Stadium, Hull, Eng; 22 Oct 2022)
- World Cup
- Appearances: 1 (first time in 2021)

The Jamaica national rugby league team represents Jamaica in international rugby league tournaments. Administered by the Jamaica Rugby League Association, the team made their full international debut at the 2009 Atlantic Cup against the United States.

The team made their first appearance at the Rugby League World Cup in 2021. They primarily wear yellow jerseys with green shorts and green socks. Their strongest line-up is composed mainly of British Jamaican professional and semi-professional players, alongside amateurs based in Jamaica.

== History ==
=== Early years ===
In July 2004 the Jamaica Rugby League Association was born. In 2005 a domestic competition was formed featuring four teams (Duhaney Park Sharks, Vauxhall Vultures, Jamaica Defence Force and Olympic Angels), and in 2006 a representative side was selected for the first time to play against a touring side from the West Yorkshire Police.

An Intercollegiate competition was launched in 2010 and now features six Universities and Colleges (University of the West Indies, University of Technology, Mico University College, Portmore Community College, GC Foster College and Excelsior Community College). There is also a thriving junior program with a number of High Schools and Primary Schools playing the sport. There is also a Division 2 competition featuring.

Jamaica played their first full international game against the United States national side in Jacksonville, Florida in the 2009 Atlantic Cup. In October that year, Jamaica got their first victory at international level against Canada as part of the 2010 Atlantic Cup.

=== Attempts at World Cup Qualification ===
In 2011 Jamaica entered the Rugby League World Cup for the first time as they contested the 2013 Rugby League World Cup qualifying Atlantic section, they failed to qualify after defeating South Africa and losing to the United States.

In 2015 Jamaica aimed to improve on their 2011 disappointment and succeed in the Americas qualification in order to qualify for their first ever World Cup in 2017 but were ultimately unsuccessful.

=== World Cup Qualification Success ===
In 2018, Jamaica entered the World Cup qualifying stages for a third time with the matches also doubling up as the 2018 Americas Rugby League Championship. On 13 November 2018, Jamaica played Canada for a place in the qualification play-off. They defeated Canada 38-8 with Ben Jones-Bishop getting two tries in the victory. On 17 November 2018, Jamaica met the United States at Hodges Stadium, Jacksonville, Florida to play for a place in the 2021 Rugby League World Cup. Jamaica raced into a 16-0 lead within the first 30 minutes of the game only for the United States to score two tries before half-time and pull the score back to 16-10 at the break. The second half was a tighter contest with defence becoming the priority for Jamaica and the half would ultimately end scoreless. Jamaica beat the United States 16-10, defeating United States for the first time in Jamaica's history and qualifying for the 2021 World Cup.

=== 2021 Rugby League World Cup ===
Jamaica made their Rugby League World Cup debut against Ireland at Headingley losing 48-2. In the second group stage match, Jamaica suffered a heavy defeat to New Zealand but scored their first ever try at the tournament. In the final group stage match, Jamaica were comprehensively beaten by Lebanon 74-12.

== Current squad ==
Squad selected for the 2026 Men's Rugby League World Cup qualification match against France on 25 October 2025.

Player	Club
Jordan Andrade	(England) Rochdale Hornets
Chris Ball	(England) Hammersmith Hills Hoists
Isaac Coleman	(England) East Leeds
Ashton Golding	(England) Huddersfield Giants
Delaine Gittens-Bedward	(England) Barrow Raiders
Josh Hudson-Lett	(England) Bedford Tigers
Ben Jones-Bishop	(England) York Knights
Jimmy Morgan	(England) Hunslet ARLFC
Jack Rampton	Free Agent
Keenan Ramsden	(Australia) Mullumbimby Giants
Kieran Rush	(England) Huddersfield Giants
Leo Skerrett-Evans	(England) Keighley Cougars
Harlen Smith	(England) Wigan Warriors
Dec Tomlinson	(England) Dewsbury Rams
Keenen Tomlinson	(England) Goole Vikings
AJ Wallace	(France) Toulouse Olympique
Jamin Williams	(Australia) St Marys Saints
James Woodburn-Hall	(England) Halifax Panthers

== Competitive Record ==
Jamaica have played 30 games in their history with their first full international being played in 2009 against the United States, despite the team having been formed three years previously in 2006.

They have only played two nations more than once, playing Canada 9 times and the United States 8 times. Jamaica regularly compete against these two nations in the Americas Rugby League Championship, having taken part in all three editions of this competition to date. They have played 5 other nations, each once. The first of these teams was South Africa in 2011. In 2016, Jamaica played games in Europe for the first time, taking on Ireland, comfortably defeating them 68-16 and Wales, drawing 16-16. In 2017, Jamaica played their toughest opponent to date, taking on 2-time World Cup runners-up France, a game they would lose 12-34.

Jamaica played their 20th game when they took on United States in the 2021 Men's Rugby League World Cup qualifying play-off, winning 16-10 and earning a place in the 2021 Rugby League World Cup in the process.

Team	First Played	Played	Win	Draw	Loss	%	Last meeting
Canada	2010	10	3	1	6	33%	2024
England Knights	2019	2	0	0	2	0%	2021
France	2017	1	0	0	1	0%	2017
Ireland	2016	2	1	0	1	50%	2022
Lebanon	2022	1	0	0	1	0%	2022
New Zealand	2022	1	0	0	1	0%	2022
Scotland	2021	1	0	1	0	0%	2021
South Africa	2011	1	1	0	0	100%	2011
United States	2009	9	2	0	7	25%	2023
Wales	2016	2	0	1	1	0%	2024
Total	2009	30	7	3	20	30%	2024

=== World Cup ===
Jamaica made their debut at the 2021 Rugby League World Cup having failed to qualify on two occasions previously in 2013 and 2017. They were the second nation from the Americas region to play in a World Cup after the United States first took part in 2013.

Rugby League World Cup Record
Year	Result	Position	Pld	W	D	L	PF	PA
1954 – 2000	team did not exist							
(Australia) 2008	not eligible							
(England) (Wales) 2013	did not qualify							
(Australia) (New Zealand) (Papua New Guinea) 2017	did not qualify							
(England) 2021	Group Stage	4th in Group C	4	0	0	4	20	190

=== Americas Rugby League Championship ===
The Americas Rugby League Championship was introduced through the RLIF policy of international expansion and development. Previous to the tournament's existence, the only regional competition in the Americas was the annual Colonial Cup however only the United States and Canada competed in this. The new competition would feature three teams with Jamaica being the new edition. Jamaica have competed in all 3 editions to date. In 2016, they would finish third but would improve their position by a single place in the following two editions, finishing as runners-up in 2017 and being crowned champions in 2018. That year also saw the expansion of the competition to four teams with the addition of Chile.

Americas Rugby League Championship Record
Year	Position	Pld	W	D	L
(United States) 2015	2/3	2	1	0	1
(United States) (Canada) 2016	3/3	2	0	0	2
(United States) (Canada) 2017	2/3	2	1	0	1
(United States) 2018	1/4	2	2	0	0

== Honours ==
Regional:
Americas Rugby League Championship:

- Champions (1): 2018
- Runners-up (2): 2015, 2017

== IRL Rankings ==
IRL Men's World Rankings
Official rankings as of August 2026
Rank	Change	Team	Pts %
1	Steady	Australia	100
2	Steady	New Zealand	82
3	Steady	England	70
4	Steady	Samoa	56
5	Steady	Tonga	54
6	Steady	Papua New Guinea	47
7	Steady	Fiji	34
8	▲1	Cook Islands	24
9	▲2	Netherlands	23
10	▲2	Ukraine	21
11	▼3	France	21
12	▼2	Serbia	20
13	Steady	Wales	18
14	Steady	Ireland	17
15	Steady	Greece	14
16	Steady	Malta	14
17	▲12	Canada	13
18	▼1	Italy	11
19	▼1	Jamaica	9
20	▲7	Scotland	8
21	▲1	United States	8
22	▼3	Poland	7
23	▼3	Lebanon	7
24	▼1	Germany	7
25	▼1	Czech Republic	6
26	▼5	Norway	6
27	▼2	Chile	5
28	▲2	Philippines	5
29	▼1	South Africa	4
30	Steady	Brazil	3
31	Steady	Morocco	3
32	▲1	Argentina	3
33	▲2	Ghana	2
34	▲2	Kenya	2
35	▼1	Montenegro	2
36	▲1	Nigeria	2
37	▼5	North Macedonia	1
38	Steady	Albania	1
39	Steady	Turkey	1
40	Steady	Bulgaria	1
41	Steady	Cameroon	0
42	Steady	Japan	0
43	Steady	Spain	0
44	Steady	Colombia	0
45	Steady	Russia	0
46	Steady	El Salvador	0
47	Steady	Bosnia and Herzegovina	0
48	Steady	Hong Kong	0
49	Steady	Solomon Islands	0
50	Steady	Vanuatu	0
51	Steady	Hungary	0
52	Steady	Latvia	0
53	Steady	Denmark	0
54	Steady	Belgium	0
55	Steady	Estonia	0
56	Steady	Sweden	0
57	Steady	Niue	0
Complete rankings at www.internationalrugbyleague.com

== See also ==
- Rugby league in the West Indies
- West Indies national rugby league team
