= 2016 Americas Rugby League Championship =

2016 Americas Championship
- Number of teams: 3
- Host countries: United States; Canada
- Winner: United States
- Matches played: 3

The 2016 Americas Rugby League Championship was the first tri-nation rugby league competition between the national teams of the USA, Canada and Jamaica.

== Results ==
16 July 2016

Jamaica	2 – 38	Canada
Goals: Myers 1/1	Report	Try: McCarthy 1 Legault 1 Boyd 1 Grace 1 Miller 1 Hergott 1 Schouten 1 Goals: Kelly 5/5; Felix 0/1; Gemmell 0/1

Falls Township Park, Levittown, Pennsylvania (United States)
Referee: Vince Lawson
Player of the Match: -

23 July 2016

United States	54 – 4	Jamaica
Try: Taylor Alley 3 Mike Timpano 2 Junior Vaivai 1 Gabe Farley 1 Barthlemey Longchamp 1 Nick Newlin 1 CJ Cortalano 1 Goals: Mike Timpano 6/9; Junior Vaivai 1/1	Report	Try: Ronaldo Wade 1

Garthwaite Stadium, Conshohocken, Pennsylvania (United States)
Referee: -
Player of the Match: -

24 September 2016

Canada	8-14	United States
Tries: Akarika Dawn, Kevin Gurniak; Goals: Steve Piatek 0/2		Tries: Gabriel Farley, Roman Lowery, Jonathan St John; Goals: Junior Vaivai 1/3

Lamport Stadium, Toronto, Ontario (Canada)
Referee: Rickii Monk
Player of the Match: -
