= 2010 Atlantic Cup =

- Number of teams: 3
- Host country: United States
- Winner: United States
- Matches played: 3
- Attendance: 4,100 (1,367 per match)
- Tries scored: 32 (10.67 per match)
- Top try scorers: (United States) Kenny Britt (4) (Jamaica) Greg Johnson (3) (Jamaica) Ashley Johnson (3)

The 2010 Atlantic Cup (known as the Hotels of Jacksonville Atlantic Cup for sponsorship purposes) was an international rugby league tournament played in Jacksonville, Florida, U.S. The competing teams were the United States, Jamaica and Canada.

The 2010 tournament is the second staging of the Atlantic Cup. The inaugural fixture was won by the United States, who defeated Jamaica 37–22. With the addition of Canada, the format of the tournament was changed from a single match to a round robin with no final. The United States retained the trophy by winning both of their games. Super League referee Phil Bentham was in charge of refereeing all three matches. Like the previous year's tournament, the 2010 match was held at Hodges Stadium at the University of North Florida.

USA's Australian-raised halfback Damien O’Malveney was named player of the tournament.

== Squads ==
=== Jamaica ===
Club Team	Players
(England) Birmingham Bulldogs	Ashley Johnson
(England) Bramley Buffaloes	Junior Henderson
(Jamaica) Duhaney Park Sharks	Andre Reid, Damon Gayle, Jermaine Pinnock, Roy Calvert, Romaen Campbell, Ryan Grant
(England) Gateshead Thunder	Joseph Brown
(England) Huddersfield Giants	Alexander Brown, Greg Johnson
(England) Hunslet Hawks	Waine Pryce
(England) Keighley Cougars	Jamaine Wray
(England) Halifax	Paul White
(England) Harlequins RL	Lamont Bryan
(Jamaica) Olympic Angels	Robert Rodney
(Jamaica) Vauxhall Vultures	Andrew Fong, Claude Yen, Carlye Burger, Jahdeek Clarke, Omar Jones, Sandino Hastings, Tyronie Rowe
(England) York City Knights	Wayne Reittie

=== United States ===
Club Team	Players
(United States) Jacksonville Axemen	Apple Pope, Taco Pope, Bob Knoepfel, Brent Shorten, Kenny Britt, Matt Clark, Akarika Dawn, Matt Thornton,
(United States) Philadelphia Fight	Jared Frymoyer, Larry Madden
(United States) Aston Bulls	Mike Brazill, Luke Collins, Andrew Kneisly, Conway Maraki, Nate Smith, Kevin Wiggins
(United States) Maui	Vaka Manupuna, Sione Taufa
(United States) Connecticut Wildcats	Curtis Cunz, Will Garcia
(United States) New Haven Warriors	Keiki Misipeka, Siose Muliumu, Ewan Robinson, Derrick Roma, Damien O'Malveney
(United States) New York Knights RLFC	Kirk Miller, Sean Taylor, Gareth Baxendale

=== Canada ===
Players
Tyler Allen, David Burton, Geoffrey Bylund, Stephen Conlon, Shane Ferrell, Antonio Felix, Dale Fitzgerald, Cameron Grace, Marc Hanke, Joshua In, Rafal Kacimarek, Thomas Kimball, Steve Lamb, Robin Legault, Jamie Lester, Timothy Mason, Henry Miers, Adam Moody, Ben White, Mathew Wyles, Chris Fleming

== Round 1 ==
=== United States vs Jamaica ===
Tuesday, 16 November
18:30

United States	36–26	Jamaica
Tries: Conway Maraki (3), Kenny Britt (2), Sean Taylor, Matt Thornton, Nate Smith Goals: Nate Smith (4)	Report Report 2	Tries: Greg Johnson (2), Jamaine Wray, Alex Brown, Paul White Goals: Junior Brandford (3)

Hodges Stadium, Jacksonville, USA
Attendance: 500
Referee: Phil Bentham (England)
Player of the Match: Jamaine Wray

== Round 2 ==
=== Canada vs Jamaica ===
Thursday, 18 November
18:30

Canada	12–32	Jamaica
Tries: Geoff Byland, Adam Moody, Matt Wyles	Report	Tries: Ashley Johnson (3), Greg Johnson (1), Paul White, Alex Brown; Goals: Paul White (4)

Hodges Stadium, Jacksonville, USA
Attendance: 800
Referee: Phil Bentham (England)
Player of the Match: Romaen Campbell

== Round 3 ==
=== United States vs Canada ===
Saturday, 20 November
15:00

United States	46–12	Canada
Tries: Damien O'Malveney (3), Kenny Britt (2), Nate Smith (2), Sione Taufa, Mike Cartwright; Goals: Nate Smith (5)	Report	Tries: Robin Legault (2); Goals: Adam Moddy (1), Robin Legault (1)

Hodges Stadium, Jacksonville, USA
Attendance: 2800
Referee: Phil Bentham (England)
Player of the Match: Apple Pope
