= United States men's national rugby league team =

National rugby league team

United States

Team information
- Nickname: Hawks
- Governing body: USA Rugby League
- Region: Americas Rugby League
- Head coach: (Australia) Adam Woolnough
- Most caps: Gary Kerkorian (17)
- Top try-scorer: Taylor Alley; Alvin Kirkland (17)
- Top point-scorer: Gary Kerkorian (171)
- Home stadium: Hodges Stadium
- IRL ranking: Current 21st Highest Rank (Aug 2014) 9th Lowest Rank (June 2023) 38th

Uniforms
First colours

Team results
- First international
- France 31–0 United States (Toulouse, France; October 1954)
- Biggest win
- Japan 6–78 United States (Jacksonville, U.S.; June 27, 2003)
- Biggest defeat
- England 110–0 United States (Orlando, U.S.; 2000)
- World Cup
- Appearances: 2 (first time in 2013)
- Best result: Quarterfinals (2013)

The United States national rugby league team represents the United States in international rugby league competitions. The team is managed by the USA Rugby League (USARL).

The United States competed with little success in some international games during the 1950s, but did not return to consistent competition until 1987. Following the establishment of the American National Rugby League (AMNRL) in 1997, the team began to participate in more regular international competition. They reached the quarterfinals of the 2013 Rugby League World Cup. In 2014, the USARL became the national governing body for rugby league in the United States.

== History ==
=== Early years ===
One of the earliest attempts to introduce rugby league to the United States was in 1953, when wrestling promoter, Mike Dimitro was asked to organize an American rugby league tour of Australia and New Zealand.

The team, known as the American All-Stars, was given a huge schedule that included 26 matches against Australian and New Zealand sides. None of the 22 American players had played rugby league before the tour, and they presented themselves in American football-like attire early on in the tournament. The team won six games and tied two.

Their second match of the tour, a 52–25 loss to a Sydney side, drew a crowd of 65,453 at the Sydney Cricket Ground.
Three days later a crowd of 32,554 at the SCG watched New South Wales defeat the Americans 62–41. After a consistent lack of competition, crowds were reasonable, but never reached the great height that the match at the SCG did.

The tour did not result in any meaningful growth for American rugby league. However, Mike Dimitro did not give up; he was able to organize two exhibitions against Australia and New Zealand in California that did not turn out to be a big success.

=== 1987–1999: Revival ===
In an attempt boost rugby league's popularity in America, a 1987 State of Origin series match was held in the Long Beach, California. The Blues won 30–18 in front of 12,349 at Veterans Memorial Stadium. That same year the United States played their first international game since 1954 against Canada. The also competed as the USA Patriots in the Rugby League World Sevens tournaments between 1992 and 1997.

In 1997 Super League America formed to organize a national team, establish an amateur domestic competition, and build the sport in the United States. The organization was initially established by Rupert Murdoch's News Corporation in an attempt to spread rugby league to the United States. The United States Tomahawks warmed up for the 2000 Rugby League Emerging Nations Tournament with a three-match tour of New South Wales, Australia. On Friday August 11, they took on Forster XIII, drawn from Forster's two clubs, the Hawks and the Dragons. The Americans were defeated 32–12. They also played the South Sydney Rabbitohs at the old Redfern Oval during Souths' appeal to return to the Australian NRL.

=== 2000–2010: Regular competition ===
2004 U.S. team shirt

Team badge used until 2010

In 2001, as a response to the September 11 attacks, the AMNRL set up a rugby league match between local U.S. born players (USA All Stars) and AMNRL players who were born overseas (World Allies All Stars). The match was won by the USA All Stars 27–26. Proceeds from the game were donated to the Red Cross to help with cleanup operations. Since 2002, the Tomahawks have been playing regular international competition in the United States. In 2002, the United States were defeated by Russia 54–10 in front of over 5,000 spectators in Moscow.

On December 1, 2004, the Tomahawks played their first ever international game against the Australian Kangaroos, the reigning World Cup champions. The game was known as the Liberty Bell Cup and was played at Franklin Field at the University of Pennsylvania and was played on a grid iron size synthetic field (Fox Sports Australia commentators Warren Smith and former Australian captain Laurie Daley reported that the Kangaroos were not too enthused about playing on the synthetic turf). It was also played in 20 minute quarters rather than the normal 40 minute halves. The Tomahawks shocked the Australians by quickly racing to a 12-0 lead in the first quarter. A third converted try just 4 minutes into the 2nd quarter saw Americans lead by the unbelievable score of 18-0 until replacement forward Petero Civoniceva sent fullback Matthew Bowen on a 60-meter run to score under the posts with 5 minutes remaining in the first half. However, a fourth converted try saw the home side lead by the World Champions 24-6 at half time. The Americans actually led for most of the game until the Kangaroos' superior fitness saw them rally in the last quarter of the game to win 36–24. Although they lost the game, many consider this to be the American's finest moment in international rugby league competition.

In October 2006, the U.S. were placed in a four team Atlantic World Cup qualifying pool along with South Africa, West Indies and Japan. South Africa and the West Indies withdrew from qualifying so therefore the group was reduced to a single game between the U.S. and Japan which the U.S. won 54–18. They then advanced to the Repechage Semi Final where they lost 42–10 to Samoa. Despite playing well against Samoa and coming within two games of qualifying for the World Cup, the United States were dropped from 14th down to 15th place when the new world rankings were released after the tournament.

In 2009 and 2010 the United States hosted other emerging North American teams in the Atlantic Cup.

=== 2011–2013: First World Cup ===
In 2011, seven teams in the AMNRL domestic competition broke away to form the USA Rugby League. The AMNRL denied selection to players affiliated with USARL teams, including players who had been selected for the Tomahawks previously.

In 2012, the U.S. entered World Cup qualifying for the second time in another bid to qualify for their first World Cup in 2013. They began with a comprehensive 40–4 victory over the South Africa in Philadelphia, and followed it up with a 40–4 victory over Jamaica to qualify for the 2013 Rugby League World Cup for the first time.

The Tomahawks won a warm-up match against 4th-ranked France, defeating them 22–18 in Toulouse in the U.S. best victory to date.

In the finals, they were drawn in a group with the Cook Islands and Wales as well as an inter-group game against Scotland. They began by beating the Cook Islands 32–0 and then Wales 24–16, before losing 22–8 to Scotland, although they still ended up winning their group. As group winners, they advanced to the quarter finals to face Australia, losing 62-0 to be eliminated from the tournament.

=== 2014–present: USARL ===
Following the World Cup, the national team was put on hiatus while the governance dispute between the AMNRL and the USARL was resolved. The team subsequently lost the right to automatic qualification for the 2017 Rugby League World Cup. In November 2014, stewardship of the national team was transferred to the USARL, and the team was rebranded from Tomahawks to Hawks. Brian McDermott was subsequently appointed head coach and his first job was to help the U.S. re-secure the World Cup qualification that they first won four years earlier. The team performed the qualification tournament, held in the United States, in December 2015. The team qualified for their second consecutive World Cup after winning both their matches.

The United States were drawn in a tough group with Fiji, Italy and Papua New Guinea. They lost their first game against Fiji 58-12, following it up with a 46-0 thumping by Italy and finally losing 64-0 in their final pool game against Papua New Guinea.

== Coaching history ==
No.	Name	Years	G	W	L	D	%
1	(Australia) Norm Robinson	1953	1	0	1	0	0
2	(United States) Rob Balachandran						
3	(United States) Bob Brhel	1993	1	1	0	0	100
4	(United States) Mike Sutila	1993	1	1	0	0	100
5	(United States) Greg Gerard	1994	2	1	1	0	50
6	(United States) David Niu	1996	1	0	1	0	0
7	(Australia) Shane Millard	1999	3	2	1	0	66.7
8	(Australia) Matthew Elliott	2001	1	1	0	0	100
9	(United States) Bill Hansbury	2002	1	0	1	0	100
10	(Australia) John Cartwright	2004	1	0	1	0	0
11	(United States) David Niu	2009	1	1	0	0	100
12	(Australia) Matthew Elliott	2011	1	0	1	0	0
13	(United States) David Niu	2011	1	0	1	0	0
14	(Australia) Matthew Elliott	2011	2	2	0	0	100
15	(United States) Ben Kelly	2013	4	3	1	0	75
16	(Australia) Brian Smith	2013	0	0	0	0	0
17	(Australia) Terry Matterson	2013–2014	4	2	2	0	50
18	(Australia) Peter Illfield	2015	2	0	2	0	0
19	(England) Brian McDermott	2015	2	2	0	0	100
20	(England) Robin Peers & (Australia) Dustin Cooper	2016	1	1	0	0	100
21	(Australia) Sean Rutgerson	2017	2	2	0	0	100
22	(England) Brian McDermott	2017	3	0	3	0	0
23	(Australia) Sean Rutgerson	2018	2	1	1	0	50
24	(Australia) Brent Richardson	2019	1	0	1	0	0
25	(Australia) Sean Rutgerson	2019–2025	7	3	3	1	50
26	(Australia) Adam Woolnough	2026–present	1	1	0	0	100

== Current squad ==
Head coach: Adam Woolnough

Squad selected in September 2026 for an test match aginast Wales in October.

Player	Position	Club
Ethan Kenneth Povey	Hooker, Five-Eight, Lock	(United States) Los Angeles Roosters
Ulice Gillard III	Wing	(Australia) Noosa Pirates
Esteban Tupuola	Five-Eight, Centre	(United States) Los Angeles Roosters
Anson Jiang	Prop, Second-row, Lock	(United States) New York Knights
Tyler Dupree	Prop	(England) Castleford Tigers
Celcius Tarawhiti	Half Back	(United States) USA Hawks
Wes Piggins	Second-row, Lock, Centre	(United States) Sarasota Bull Sharks
Joseph Eichner	Lock	(United States) Tampa Mayhem
Kyle Granby	Utility	(United States) Brooklyn Kings
Alex Griffin	Hooker	(United States) New York Knights
Matthew Finnesy	Prop	(United States) Tampa Mayhem
Jason Martin	Centre, Wing	(United States) Jacksonville Axemen
Gregory Tyler	Lock	(United States) Los Angeles Roosters
Shingirai Hlanguyo	Wing	(United States) Los Angeles Roosters
Taylor Jordan	Prop, Centre	(United States) DC Cavalry
Tevita Bryce	Prop	(United States) New York Knights
George Hill	Hooker, Second-row, Lock	(England) Castleford Tigers
Daniel Vidot	Second-row, Centre	(United States) DC Cavalry
Jerome Veve	Prop	(Australia) North Devils
Anthony Russo	Prop	(United States) New York Knights
Kyle McCollum	Centre	(United States) Jacksonville Axemen

== Competitive record ==
=== Overall and IRL Rankings ===
IRL Men's World Rankings
Official rankings as of August 2026
Rank	Change	Team	Pts %
1	Steady	Australia	100
2	Steady	New Zealand	82
3	Steady	Tonga	70
4	Steady	Samoa	56
5	Steady	England	54
6	Steady	Papua New Guinea	47
7	Steady	Fiji	34
8	▲1	Cook Islands	24
9	▲2	Netherlands	23
10	▲2	Ukraine	21
11	▼3	France	21
12	▼2	Serbia	20
13	Steady	Wales	18
14	Steady	Ireland	17
15	Steady	Greece	14
16	Steady	Malta	14
17	▲12	Canada	13
18	▼1	Italy	11
19	▼1	Jamaica	9
20	▲7	Scotland	8
21	▲1	United States	8
22	▼3	Poland	7
23	▼3	Lebanon	7
24	▼1	Germany	7
25	▼1	Czech Republic	6
26	▼5	Norway	6
27	▼2	Chile	5
28	▲2	Philippines	5
29	▼1	South Africa	4
30	Steady	Brazil	3
31	Steady	Morocco	3
32	▲1	Argentina	3
33	▲2	Ghana	2
34	▲2	Kenya	2
35	▼1	Montenegro	2
36	▲1	Nigeria	2
37	▼5	North Macedonia	1
38	Steady	Albania	1
39	Steady	Turkey	1
40	Steady	Bulgaria	1
41	Steady	Cameroon	0
42	Steady	Japan	0
43	Steady	Spain	0
44	Steady	Colombia	0
45	Steady	Russia	0
46	Steady	El Salvador	0
47	Steady	Bosnia and Herzegovina	0
48	Steady	Hong Kong	0
49	Steady	Solomon Islands	0
50	Steady	Vanuatu	0
51	Steady	Hungary	0
52	Steady	Latvia	0
53	Steady	Denmark	0
54	Steady	Belgium	0
55	Steady	Estonia	0
56	Steady	Sweden	0
57	Steady	Niue	0
Complete rankings at www.internationalrugbyleague.com

U.S. national side's competitive record up to date as of 27 October 2026.

Opponent	Matches	Won	Drawn	Lost	Win %	For	Against	Difference
Australia	2	0	0	2	0%	24	98	–74
Canada	28	22	1	5	78.57%	914	448	+466
Chile	1	1	0	0	100%	62	0	+62
Cook Islands	3	1	0	2	33.33%	56	122	–66
England	1	0	0	1	0%	0	110	–110
Fiji	1	0	0	1	0%	12	58	–46
France	2	1	0	1	50%	22	49	–27
Greece	1	0	0	1	0%	10	46	–36
Ireland	3	0	0	3	0%	50	112	–62
Ireland A	6	4	0	2	66.67%	150	100	+50
Italy	3	0	0	3	0%	22	120	–98
Jamaica	9	7	0	2	77.78%	299	144	+155
Japan	5	5	0	0	100%	252	44	+208
Lebanon	1	0	0	1	0%	8	62	–54
Morocco	1	1	0	0	100%	50	10	+40
Māori	1	0	0	1	0%	23	40	–17
New Zealand	1	0	0	1	0%	14	74	–60
Papua New Guinea	1	0	0	1	0%	0	64	–64
Russia	5	0	0	5	0%	70	209	–139
Samoa	3	1	0	2	50%	38	88	–50
Scotland	3	1	0	2	33.333%	52	80	-28
South Africa	3	3	0	0	100%	122	54	+68
Tonga	1	0	0	1	0%	20	28	–8
Wales	4	1	0	3	25%	50	218	–168
Total	89	48	1	40	53.93%	2,320	2,380	–60

=== World Cup ===
The U.S. have competed in 2 World Cups. In 2007 they entered into qualifying for the 2008 World Cup but were unsuccessful. However, they qualified for the following 2013 World Cup and reached the quarter finals.

Rugby League World Cup Record
Year	Result	Position	Pld	W	D	L	PF	PA
(France) 1954	did not participate							
(Australia) 1957	did not participate							
(England) 1960	did not participate							
(Australia) (New Zealand) 1968	did not participate							
(England) 1970	did not participate							
(France) 1972	did not participate							
1975	did not participate							
(Australia) (New Zealand) 1977	did not participate							
1985–88	did not participate							
1989–92	did not participate							
(England) 1995	did not participate							
(United Kingdom) (France) 2000	did not qualify							
(Australia) 2008	did not qualify							
(England) (Wales) 2013	Quarter final	5th	4	2	0	2	64	122
(Australia) (New Zealand) (Papua New Guinea) 2017	Group Stage	14th	3	0	0	3	12	168
(England) 2021	did not qualify							
(Australia) 2026	did not qualify							

=== Colonial Cup ===
The Colonial Cup is an international Cup competition between the U.S. and Canada.

Colonial Cup Record
Year	Result	Pld	W	D	L
2010	Winners	1	1	0	0
2011	Winners	2	1	0	1
2012	Winners	2	2	0	0
2013	Winners	4	3	0	1
2014	Runners up	1	0	0	1
2015	Runners up	3	1	0	2
2016	Winners	2	2	0	0
2017	Winners	1	1	0	0
2024	Draw	1	0	1	0

=== Americas Championship ===
The Americas Rugby League Championship is an international tournament contested by Americas national rugby league teams.

Americas Rugby League Championship Record
Year	Result	Pld	W	D	L	PF	PA
Atlantic Cup (2009-2010)
(United States) 2009	Winners	1	1	0	0	37	22
(United States) 2010	Winners	2	2	0	0	82	38
Americas Championship (2016-onwards)
(United States) (Canada) 2016	Winners	2	2	0	0	68	12
(United States) (Canada) 2017	Winners	2	2	0	0	84	24
(United States) 2018	Runners up	2	1	0	1	72	16

=== World Cup 9s ===
Rugby League World Cup 9s Record
Year	Result	Position	Pld	W	D	L	PF	PA
(Australia) 2019	Group stage	12th	3	0	0	3	21	114

=== World Nines results ===
- Tonga def. United States 26–4 (1997)
- Fiji def. United States 18–8 (1997)
- Cook Islands def. United States 24–6 (1997)
- Papua New Guinea def. United States 38–8 (1997)
- Western Samoa def. United States 30–10 (1997)
- Australia def. United States 24–0 (1997)
- Cook Islands def. United States 22–0 (1996)
- United States def. Morocco 18–4 (1996)
- Western Samoa def. United States 14–6 (1996)
- Australia def. United States 30–16 (1996)
- Scotland def. United States 12–6 (1996)

=== World Sevens results ===
- Illawarra def. United States* 18–6 (1997) *unofficial team
- United States* def. Japan 18–14 (1997) *unofficial team
- Italy def. United States* 22–0 (1997) *unofficial team
- Gold Coast def. United States* 40–8 (1996) *unofficial team
- United States* def. Japan 20–8 (1996) *unofficial team
- Melbourne def. United States* 18–14 (1996) *unofficial team
- Australian Aboriginals def. United States* 28–0 (1996) *unofficial team
- Tonga def. United States 20–4 (1995)
- United States def. Russia 28–8 (1995)
- United States def. Italy 22–4 (1995)
- United States def. Russia 20–6 (1995)
- Sydney Tigers def. United States 24–10 (1995)
- South Africa def. United States 20–8 (1994)
- New Zealand def. United States 20–12 (1994)
- France def. United States 18–12 (1994)
- Wainuiomata def. United States 34–8 (1993)
- South Sydney def. United States 28–6 (1993)
- Illawarra def. United States 28–4 (1993)
- Fiji def. United States 30–10 (1992)
- United States def. CIS Red Arrows 12–8 (1992)
- South Sydney def. United States 12–0 (1992)
- Newcastle def. United States 16–0 (1992)

=== Student results ===
- United States def. Japan 54–10 (1996)
- Wales def. United States 22–18 (1996)
- Western Samoa def. United States 82–8 (1996)
- New Zealand def. United States 62–10 (1996)
- United States def. Ireland 22–20 (1996)

=== Other representative results ===
- USA All Stars def. World Allies All Stars 27–26 (2001)
- Sydney def. USA All Stars 52–25 (1953)

=== Margins and streaks ===
Biggest winning margins

Margin	Score	Opponent	Venue	Date
72	78–6	Japan	Jacksonville	27 June 2003
62	62–0	Chile	Hodges Stadium	13 Nov 2018
50	54–4	Jamaica	Philadelphia	23 July 2016
42	48–6	Jamaica	Hodges Stadium	22 July 2017
36	40–4	South Africa	Campbell's Field	15 Oct 2011
36	40–4	Jamaica	Campbell's Field	23 Oct 2011

Biggest losing margins

Margin	Score	Opponent	Venue	Date
110	0–110	England	Disney WWOS	21 Oct 2000
64	0–64	Papua New Guinea	Santos National Football Stadium	12 Nov 2017
62	0–62	Australia	Racecourse Ground	16 Nov 2013
46	12–58	Fiji	1300SMILES Stadium	28 Oct 2017
46	0–46	Italy	1300SMILES Stadium	5 Nov 2017

== Stadium ==
Since 2009, the U.S. have primarily used Hodges Stadium in Jacksonville to host international rugby league matches. Garthwaite Stadium in Conshohocken, Pennsylvania has also hosted several international rugby league fixtures.

== See also ==
- United States women's national rugby league team
