= Canada national rugby league team =

Rugby league team

Canada

Team information
- Nickname: Wolverines
- Governing body: Canada Rugby League
- Region: Americas
- Head coach: Aaron Zimmerle
- Captain: Skyler Dumas
- Home stadium: Lamport Stadium
- IRL ranking: 17th

Uniforms
First colours	Second colours

Team results
- First international
- Canada 23–10 United States (1987)
- Biggest win
- Canada 52–14 United States (Toronto, Ontario; 9 August 2014)
- Biggest defeat
- England 68–4 Canada (Toronto, Ontario; 6 October 2012)

The Canada national rugby league team represents Canada in international rugby league football tournaments.

== History ==
=== 1987–2000: Origins ===
Rugby league was first introduced to Canada in the 1900s but was quickly outlawed by Rugby Union officials and thus became Canadian football. It was not until the late 1980s that rugby league was re-introduced to Canada at an amateur level, when a short-lived 4-team domestic competition, known as the Tri-Counties Rugby League, was established. Four teams competed in its first year, three in Canada and one in the U.S., the New York–based Adirondacks club.

The Canadian national team played their first game in 1987 against the USA. They then played sporadically throughout the 1990s and participated in the 1995 and '96 Rugby League World Sevens and Rugby League Emerging Nations World Cup in 2000. Following the 2000 Emerging Nations World Cup, the Canadian Rugby League Federation folded. As a result, the national team was disbanded and the sport remained dormant for 10 years.

=== 2010 onwards: Revival ===
The briefly used "Mounties" 2010 logo

In 2010, a new governing body, Canada Rugby League, was formed. Their first comeback game was in 2010 in the War at the Shore tournament, where they played New England Immortals, a New England representative team, and the New York Knights AMNRL club team, losing both games. The team's international comeback was later in the year in September in the inaugural Colonial Cup. Later that year they competed in the Rugby League Atlantic Cup in Jacksonville, Florida.

Canada's first win since they were reformed came the following year in 2011 against Jamaica. They collected their second win in September, against the US in the second game of the Colonial Cup. However, due to an earlier loss to the US and the resulting aggregate scores, Canada was unable to win the Cup. Canada's international season finished up with a defeat against South Africa, in a warm up game before their 2013 World Cup qualifiers campaign.

In 2014, Stuart Donlan was appointed as head coach. Donlan's first game was the 2014 Colonial Cup's only fixture. He coached Canada to a famous victory which made them the Colonial Cup champions for the very first time. Aaron Zimmerle, the head coach of the Tweed Heads Seagulls, took over the main coaching role in 2015 in their 2017 World Cup qualifying campaign.

After failing to qualify for the 2017 World Cup, the Canada Rugby League Board appointed Benjamin Fleming as coach on a three-year deal. Canada Rugby League Association Vice President David Graham said "the board's decision to appoint Fleming as Head Coach was based on the hard work and passion he has shown since returning to the association last year."

== Current squad ==
Canada squad for 22nd November, 2025 match against Jamaica.

Player	Position	Club
Jacob Bourne	Fullback	Point Grey Thunder
Jalen Harrison	Right Wing	Vancouver Valley Vipers
Jason Chuck	Right Centre	Brampton Beavers
Colin Crozier	Left Centre	Durham Dawgs
Darian Archer	Left Wing	Brantford Broncos
Rhys Jacks	Stand Off/Five Eighth	Whistler Wolves
Greg Wise	Halfback/Scrum Half	Brampton Beavers
Dan Martyn	Prop	Vancouver Valley Vipers
Toby Horn	Hooker	Whistler Wolves
Chuck Curran	Prop	Brantford Broncos
Qais Nasseri	Right Second Row	Durham Dawgs
Augustus Murphy	Left Second Row	Royal City
Scyler Dumas	Lock Forward	Vancouver Dragons
Robin Legault	Interchange	Whistler Wolves
Doug Howard	Interchange	Leichhardt Wanderers
Blake Marshall	Interchange	Wynnum Manly
Oliver Lenahan	Interchange	Vancouver Valley Vipers

== Competitive Record ==
=== Overall and IRL Rankings ===
IRL Men's World Rankings
Official rankings as of August 2026
Rank	Change	Team	Pts %
1	Steady	Australia	100
2	Steady	New Zealand	82
3	Steady	England	70
4	Steady	Samoa	56
5	Steady	Tonga	54
6	Steady	Papua New Guinea	47
7	Steady	Fiji	34
8	▲1	Cook Islands	24
9	▲2	Netherlands	23
10	▲2	Ukraine	21
11	▼3	France	21
12	▼2	Serbia	20
13	Steady	Wales	18
14	Steady	Ireland	17
15	Steady	Greece	14
16	Steady	Malta	14
17	▲12	Canada	13
18	▼1	Italy	11
19	▼1	Jamaica	9
20	▲7	Scotland	8
21	▲1	United States	8
22	▼3	Poland	7
23	▼3	Lebanon	7
24	▼1	Germany	7
25	▼1	Czech Republic	6
26	▼5	Norway	6
27	▼2	Chile	5
28	▲2	Philippines	5
29	▼1	South Africa	4
30	Steady	Brazil	3
31	Steady	Morocco	3
32	▲1	Argentina	3
33	▲2	Ghana	2
34	▲2	Kenya	2
35	▼1	Montenegro	2
36	▲1	Nigeria	2
37	▼5	North Macedonia	1
38	Steady	Albania	1
39	Steady	Turkey	1
40	Steady	Bulgaria	1
41	Steady	Cameroon	0
42	Steady	Japan	0
43	Steady	Spain	0
44	Steady	Colombia	0
45	Steady	Russia	0
46	Steady	El Salvador	0
47	Steady	Bosnia and Herzegovina	0
48	Steady	Hong Kong	0
49	Steady	Solomon Islands	0
50	Steady	Vanuatu	0
51	Steady	Hungary	0
52	Steady	Latvia	0
53	Steady	Denmark	0
54	Steady	Belgium	0
55	Steady	Estonia	0
56	Steady	Sweden	0
57	Steady	Niue	0
Complete rankings at www.internationalrugbyleague.com

Below is the head-to-head record of the Canadian national rugby league team up to date as of 14 July 2026.

Against	First Played	P	W	L	D	% Won	Last Played	F	A	D
Bosnia and Herzegovina	2019	1	1	0	0	100%	2018	78	2	+76
Chile	2018	1	1	0	0	100%	2018	62	12	+50
England Lionhearts	2012	2	0	2	0	0%	2014	16	102	–86
Fiji	2016	1	0	1	0	0%	2016	12	26	–14
France	1995	1	0	1	0	0%	1995	32	72	–40
Italy	2000	1	0	1	0	0%	2000	6	66	–60
Jamaica	2010	11	6	4	1	54.55%	2025	250	214	+36
Japan	1999	2	1	1	0	50%	2000	28	26	+2
Lebanon	2012	1	1	0	0	100%	2012	36	18	+18
Netherlands	2026	1	1	0	0	100%	2026	34	6	+28
Norway	2026	1	1	0	0	100%	2026	56	6	+50
Scotland	2026	1	0	1	0	0%	2026	10	22	–12
Serbia	2019	1	0	1	0	0%	2019	8	36	–28
South Africa	2011	1	0	1	0	0%	2011	22	36	–14
United States	1993	28	5	22	1	20.83%	2024	448	914	–466
Total	1993	54	17	35	2	33.33%	2026	1,098	1,558	–460

=== World Cup ===
World Cup Record
Year	Round	Position	Pld	Win	Draw	Loss
(France) 1954	did not enter					
(Australia) 1957	did not enter					
(England) 1960	did not enter					
(Australia) (New Zealand) 1968	did not enter					
(England) 1970	did not enter					
(France) 1972	did not enter					
1975	did not enter					
(Australia) (New Zealand) 1977	did not enter					
1985–88	did not enter					
1989–92	did not enter					
(England) 1995	did not enter					
(United Kingdom) (Ireland) (France) 2000	did not qualify					
(Australia) 2008	did not qualify					
(England) (Wales) 2013	did not qualify					
(Australia) (New Zealand) (Papua New Guinea) 2017	did not qualify					
(England) 2021	did not qualify					
(Australia) 2026	did not qualify					

=== Colonial Cup ===
Colonial Cup record
Year	Round	Position	GP	W	L	D
(Canada) 2010	Second place	2/2	1	0	1	0
(Canada) (United States) 2011	Second place	2/2	2	1	1	0
(United States) (Canada) 2012	Second place	2/2	2	0	2	0
(Canada) (United States) 2013	Second place	2/2	4	1	3	0
(Canada) 2014	Champions	1/2	1	1	0	0
(United States) 2015	Champions	1/2	3	2	1	0
(Canada) (United States) 2016	Second place	2/2	2	0	2	0
(Canada) 2017	Second place	2/2	1	0	1	0
(United States) 2024	Draw	1/2	1	0	0	1
Total	2 Titles	9/9	17	5	11	1

=== Caribbean Carnival Cup ===
- The Caribbean Carnival Cup is annual series that has been played between Canada and Jamaica since 2011.

Caribbean Cup record
Year	Round	Position	GP	W	L	D
(Canada) 2011	Champions	1/2	1	1	0	0
(Canada) 2012	Champions	1/2	1	1	0	0
(Canada) 2013	Champions	1/2	1	1	0	0
(Canada) 2014	Champions	1/2	1	1	0	0
Total	4 Titles	4/4	4	4	0	0

=== Americas Rugby League Championship ===
The tournament contested by Americas national rugby league teams.

Americas Rugby League Championship Record
Year	Result	Pld	W	D	L	PF	PA
Atlantic Cup (2009-2010)
(United States) 2009	Not Invited						
(United States) 2010	3rd	2	0	0	2	24	78
Americas Championship (2016-onwards)
(United States) (Canada) 2016	2nd	2	1	0	1	46	16
(United States) (Canada) 2017	3rd	2	0	0	2	32	64
(United States) 2018	3rd	2	1	0	1	70	50

== See also ==
- Toronto Wolfpack
- Rugby league in Canada
