= 2019 USARL season =

Rugby league season

2019 USARL Season
- League: USA Rugby League
- Duration: May 25 - August 24
- Teams: 11

2019 season
- Champions: Brooklyn Kings RLFC

The 2019 USA Rugby League season is the 22nd season overall of semi-professional rugby league competition in the United States and the 8th season under the governance of the USARL.

== Teams ==
North Conference
| Colors | Club | Founded | City (MSA) | State | Stadium | Titles (Last) |
| | Boston Thirteens | 2009 | Boston | Massachusetts | Eastern Boston Stadium | 1 (2015) |
| | Brooklyn Kings RLFC | 2014 | Brooklyn | New York | Randalls Island Field 10 | 0 (N/A) |
| | Delaware Black Foxes | 2015 | Wilmington | Delaware | Eden Park Stadium | 0 (N/A) |
| | Northern Virginia Eagles | 2007 | Nokesville | Virginia | Grizzly Sports Complex | 0 (N/A) |
| | Philadelphia Fight | 1998 | Conshohocken (Philadelphia) | Pennsylvania | Garthwaite Stadium | 4 (2016) |
| | White Plains Wombats | 2016 | White Plains | New York | Blind Brook Elementary School | 0 (N/A) |

South Conference
| Colors | Club | Founded | City (MSA) | State | Stadium | Titles (Last) |
| | Atlanta Rhinos | 2014 | Atlanta | Georgia | Atlanta Silverbacks Park | 1 (2017) |
| | Jacksonville Axemen | 2006 | Jacksonville | Florida | UNF Rugby Field | 2 (2018) |
| | Lakeland Renegades | 2019 | Lakeland | Florida | All Saints Academy | 0 (N/A) |
| | Southwest Florida Copperheads | 2018 | Buckingham (Fort Myers) | Florida | Lehigh Senior High School | 0 (N/A) |
| | Tampa Mayhem | 2014 | Tampa Bay | Florida | Tampa Catholic High School | 0 (N/A) |

Locations of teams for the 2019 USARL Season
North Conference South Conference

== 2019 Season Ladder ==
North Conference
| # | Team | Pld | W | L | D | PF | PA | PD | Pts |
| 1 | Brooklyn Kings RLFC | 8 | 8 | 0 | 0 | 422 | 112 | 310 | 16 |
| 2 | Boston 13s | 8 | 6 | 2 | 0 | 292 | 200 | 92 | 12 |
| 3 | Delaware Black Foxes | 8 | 4 | 4 | 0 | 286 | 314 | -28 | 8 |
| 4 | Northern Virginia Eagles | 8 | 3 | 5 | 0 | 218 | 304 | -96 | 6 |
| 5 | White Plains Wombats | 8 | 2 | 6 | 0 | 226 | 342 | -106 | 4 |
| 6 | Philadelphia Fight | 8 | 1 | 7 | 0 | 172 | 354 | -182 | 0* |

South Conference
| # | Team | Pld | W | L | D | PF | PA | PD | Pts |
| 1 | Jacksonville Axemen | 7 | 7 | 0 | 0 | 400 | 58 | 342 | 14 |
| 2 | Tampa Mayhem | 7 | 3 | 4 | 0 | 234 | 200 | 34 | 6 |
| 3 | Atlanta Rhinos | 7 | 2 | 5 | 0 | 132 | 286 | -154 | 2*** |
| 4 | Lakeland Renegades | 7 | 1 | 6 | 0 | 82 | 332 | -250 | 2 |
| 5 | Southwest Florida Copperheads | 6 | 4 | 2 | 0 | 148 | 120 | 28 | 0** |

- * Philadelphia Fight two competition point deduction for forfeit to Northern Virginia Eagles in week 8
- ** Southwest Florida Copperheads two competition point deduction for playing unregistered players in week 1 and week 5, and forfeit to Axemen in week 6 (-6 total)
- *** Atlanta Rhinos two competition point deduction for forfeit to Southwest Florida Copperheads in week 8.
- Week 3 match between Atlanta Rhinos and Southwest Florida Copperheads in Atlanta cancelled due to weather
- Week 7 match between Lakeland Renegades and Jacksonville Axemen in Lakeland Renegades cancelled due to weather
- Week 8 match between Tampa Mayhem and Southwest Florida Copperheads in Tampa cancelled due to weather

== Results ==
=== Round 1 ===
| Home | Score | Away | Match Information | |
| Home | Score | Away | Date and Time | Venue |
|---|---|---|---|---|
| Lakeland Florida Renegades | 16-30 | Tampa Mayhem | 25 May 2019, TBD | All Saints' Academy |
| Southwest Florida Copperheads | 14-42* | Jacksonville Axemen | 25 May 2019, TBD | Dr. James A. Adams Memorial Stadium |

- Southwest Florida Copperheads fielded unregistered players and have lost two competition points.

=== Round 2 ===
| Home | Score | Away | Match Information | |
| Home | Score | Away | Date and Time | Venue |
|---|---|---|---|---|
| Philadelphia Fight | 38-34 | Northern Virginia Eagles | 1 June 2019, 17:00 | A. A. Garthwaite Stadium |
| White Plains Wombats | 34-44 | Delaware Black Foxes | 1 June 2019, TBD | White Plains High School Football |
| Lakeland Florida Renegades | 22-18 | Atlanta Rhinos | 1 June 2019, TBD | All Saints' Academy |
| Tampa Mayhem | 12-52 | Jacksonville Axemen | 1 June 2019, 17:00 | Tampa Catholic High School |
| Brooklyn Kings RLFC | 36-12 | Boston 13s | 2 June 2019, TBD | Bushwick Inlet Park |

=== Round 3 ===
| Home | Score | Away | Match Information | |
| Home | Score | Away | Date and Time | Venue |
|---|---|---|---|---|
| Northern Virginia Eagles | 12-62 | Brooklyn Kings RLFC | 8 June 2019, TBD | Grizzly Sports Complex |
| Jacksonville Axemen | 106-4 | Lakeland Renegades | 8 June 2019, 17:00 | UNF Rugby Field |
| Boston 13s | 50-30 | White Plains Wombats | 8 June 2019, 19:00 | Saunders Stadium |
| Atlanta Rhinos | NR* | Southwest Florida Copperheads | 8 June 2019, 17:00 | Atlanta Silverbacks Park |
| Delaware Black Foxes | 38-34 | Philadelphia Fight | 8 June 2019, 18:00 | Eden Park Stadium |

- *Game was abandoned due to bad weather. No word yet if the game will be replayed at a later date.

=== Round 4 ===
| Home | Score | Away | Match Information | |
| Home | Score | Away | Date and Time | Venue |
|---|---|---|---|---|
| Boston 13s | 34-18 | Delaware Black Foxes | 15 June 2019, 17:00 | Saunders Stadium |
| White Plains Wombats | 32-36 | Northern Virginia Eagles | 15 June 2019, TBD | White Plains High School Football |
| Atlanta Rhinos | 0-70 | Jacksonville Axemen | 15 June 2019, 17:00 | Atlanta Silverbacks Park |
| Southwest Florida Copperheads | 32-24 | Tampa Mayhem | 15 June 2019, 17:00 | Dr. James A. Adams Memorial Stadium |
| Brooklyn Kings RLFC | 84-12 | Philadelphia Fight | 16 June 2019, TBD | Bushwick Inlet Park |

=== Round 5 ===
| Home | Score | Away | Match Information | |
| Home | Score | Away | Date and Time | Venue |
|---|---|---|---|---|
| Delaware Black Foxes | 36-44 | Brooklyn Kings RLFC | 22 June 2019, TBD | Eden Park Stadium |
| Philadelphia Fight | 28-38 | White Plains Wombats | 22 June 2019, 17:00 | A. A. Garthwaite Stadium |
| Atlanta Rhinos | 64-28 | Tampa Mayhem | 22 June 2019, 17:30 | Atlanta Silverbacks Park |
| Lakeland Renegades | 12-30* | Southwest Florida Copperheads | 22 June 2019, 18:00 | All Saints' Academy |
| Northern Virginia Eagles | 28-52 | Boston 13s | 22 June 2019, TBD | Grizzly Sports Complex |

- Southwest Florida Copperheads fielded unregistered players and have lost two competition points.

=== Round 6 ===
| Home | Score | Away | Match Information | |
| Home | Score | Away | Date and Time | Venue |
|---|---|---|---|---|
| Northern Virginia Eagles | 52-44 | Delaware Black Foxes | 29 June 2019, TBD | Grizzly Sports Complex |
| Brooklyn Kings RLFC | 52-12 | White Plains Wombats | 29 June 2019, TBD | Bushwick Inlet Park |
| Atlanta Rhinos | 40-12 | Lakeland Renegades | 29 June 2019, TBD | Atlanta Silverbacks Park |
| Jacksonville Axemen | 30-0* | Southwest Florida Copperheads | 29 June 2019, 16:00 | UNF Rugby Field |
| Boston 13s | 42-6 | Philadelphia Fight | 29 June 2019, TBD | Saunders Stadium |

- *Southwest Florida Copperheads could not travel due to bad weather in Florida and have therefore forfeited the game. The rules are if a team forfeits a game, they lose 30-0. They also lost two competition points.

=== Round 7 ===
| Home | Score | Away | Match Information | |
| Home | Score | Away | Date and Time | Venue |
|---|---|---|---|---|
| Lakeland Renegades | NR* | Jacksonville Axemen | 6 July 2019, TBD | All Saints' Academy |
| Tampa Mayhem | 56-0 | Atlanta Rhinos | 6 July 2019, TBD | Tampa Catholic High School |

- *Game cancelled due to bad weather. No word yet if the game will be rescheduled.

=== Round 8 ===
| Home | Score | Away | Match Information | |
| Home | Score | Away | Date and Time | Venue |
|---|---|---|---|---|
| Northern Virginia Eagles | 30-0* | Philadelphia Fight | 13 July 2019, TBD | Grizzly Sports Complex |
| Tampa Mayhem | 66-4 | Lakeland Renegades | 13 July 2019, TBD | Tampa Catholic High School |
| Delaware Black Foxes | 16-52 | White Plain Wombats | 13 July 2019, TBD | Eden Park Stadium |
| Southwest Florida Copperheads | 30-0* | Atlanta Rhinos | 13 July 2019, TBD | Dr. James A. Adams Memorial Stadium |
| Boston 13s | 18-38 | Brooklyn Kings RLFC | 13 July 2019, 17:00 | Charlestown High School |

- *Atlanta Rhinos forfeited the game. The rules state that if a team forfeits a game, they lose 30-0. They also lost 2 competition points.
- *Philadelphia Fight forfeited the game against Northern Virginia Eagles and lost two competition points

=== Round 9 ===
| Home | Score | Away | Match Information | |
| Home | Score | Away | Date and Time | Venue |
|---|---|---|---|---|
| Philadelphia Fight | 38-44 | Delaware Black Foxes | 20 July 2019, TBD | A. A. Garthwaite Stadium |
| Tampa Mayhem | NR* | Southwest Florida Copperheads | 20 July 2019, TBD | Tampa Catholic High School |
| White Plains Wombats | 28-40 | Boston 13s | 20 July 2019, TBD | White Plains High School Football |
| Jacksonville Axemen | 68-10 | Atlanta Rhinos | 20 Jule 2019, TBD | UNF Rugby Field |
| Brooklyn Kings RLFC | 30-0 | Northern Virginia Eagles | 20 July 2019, TBD | Bushwick Inlet Park |

- *Tampa Mayhem and Southwest Florida Copperheads game cancelled due to bad weather

=== Round 10 ===
| Home | Score | Away | Match Information | |
| Home | Score | Away | Date and Time | Venue |
|---|---|---|---|---|
| Philadelphia Fight | 16-44 | Boston 13s | 27 July 2019, TBD | A. A. Garthwaite Stadium |
| White Plains Wombats | 10-76 | Brooklyn Kings RLFC | 27 July 2019, TBD | White Plains High School Football |
| Southwest Florida Copperheads | 42-12 | Lakeland Renegades | 27 July 2019, TBD | Dr James A. Adams Memorial Stadium |
| Jacksonville Axemen | 32-18 | Tampa Mayhem | 27 July 2019, TBD | UNF Rugby Field |
| Delaware Black Foxes | 46-26 | Northern Virginia Eagles | 27 July 2019, TBD | Eden Park Stadium |

=== Conference Semi-finals ===
| Home | Score | Away | Match Information | |
| Home | Score | Away | Date and Time | Venue |
|---|---|---|---|---|
| Brooklyn Kings RLFC | 30-0 | Northern Virginia Eagles* | 3 August 2019, TBD | Bushwick Inlet Park |
| Boston 13s | 44-22 | Delaware Black Foxes | 3 August 2019, TBD | Charlestown High School |
| Jacksonville Axemen | 68-0 | Southwest Florida Copperheads* | 3 August 2019, TBD | UNF Rugby Field |
| Tampa Mayhem | 68-6 | Lakeland Renegades | 3 August 2019, 17:30 | Tampa Catholic High School |

- * Atlanta Rhinos withdraw from the playoffs due to inability to field a side. Southwest Florida Copperheads took their place.
- Northern Virginia Eagles forfeited the game against Brooklyn Kings.

=== Conference Championships ===
| Home | Score | Away | Match Information | |
| Home | Score | Away | Date and Time | Venue |
|---|---|---|---|---|
| Brooklyn Kings RLFC | 54-0 | Boston 13s | 10 August 2019, TBD | Bushwick Inlet Park |
| Jacksonville Axemen | 28-6 | Tampa Mayhem | 10 August 2019, TBD | UNF Rugby Field |

With the wins, Jacksonville Axemen are the Champions of the Southern Conference and the Brooklyn Kings are the Champions of the Northern Conference.

=== National Championship ===
| Home | Score | Away | Match Information | |
| Home | Score | Away | Date and Time | Venue |
|---|---|---|---|---|
| Brooklyn Kings RLFC | 12 - 6 | Jacksonville Axemen | 24 August 2019, 16:00 | Floyd Bennet Field |

=== Representative Game ===
| Home | Score | Away | Match Information | |
| Home | Score | Away | Date and Time | Venue |
|---|---|---|---|---|
| South All Stars | 44 – 32 | North All Stars | 7 September 2019, 16:00 | Tournament Sportsplex of Tampa Bay |
