= 2015 USARL season =

2015 USA Rugby League
- Teams: 14
- Premiers: Boston Thirteens (1st title)
- Minor premiers: Philadelphia Fight (3rd title)

The 2015 USA Rugby League season was the fifth season of the USA Rugby League National Premiership competition, and its first as the undisputed top-level rugby league competition in the United States. Fourteen teams competed for the USARL Championship. The season began on Saturday, May 30, and concluded with the Championship Final on Saturday, August 29, in Jacksonville, Florida. The Boston Thirteens won their first USARL Championship, defeating the Atlanta Rhinos 44-12.

== Teams ==
In the wake of the folding of the AMNRL, the USARL was left as the undisputed top-level rugby league competition in the United States. Three teams joined the USARL from the AMNRL: Bucks County Sharks, Connecticut Wildcats, and New York Knights. The Delaware Black Foxes joined as an expansion squad. After several unsuccessful seasons, the Baltimore Blues left the competition.

North Conference
Northeast Division
Colors	Club	City	State	Stadium	Foundation	Joined
	Boston Thirteens	Boston	Massachusetts	MIT Steinbrenner Stadium	2009	2011
	Brooklyn Kings RLFC	Brooklyn	New York	Midwood Athletic Complex	2014	2014
	Connecticut Wildcats	Greenwich	Connecticut	Cardinal Stadium	2003	2015
	New York Knights	New York City	New York	The Castle Pier 40	2001	2015
	Rhode Island Rebellion	Providence	Rhode Island	Classical High School	2011	2011
Mid-Atlantic Division
Colors	Club	City	State	Stadium	Foundation	Joined
	Bucks County Sharks	Levittown	Pennsylvania	Falls Township Community Park	1998	2015
	D.C. Slayers	Washington	Washington	Duke Ellington Field	2003	2011
	Delaware Black Foxes	Wilmington	Delaware	Eden Park Stadium	2015	2015
	Northern Virginia Eagles	Manassas	Virginia	Grizzly Sports Complex	2007	2014
	Philadelphia Fight	Conshohocken	Pennsylvania	A. A. Garthwaite Stadium	1998	2011

South Conference
Colors	Club	City	State	Stadium	Foundation	Joined
	Atlanta Rhinos	Atlanta	Georgia	Atlanta Silverbacks Park	2014	2014
	Central Florida Warriors	DeLand	Florida	Spec Martin Stadium	2014	2014
	Jacksonville Axemen	Jacksonville	Florida	Hodges Stadium	2006	2011
	Tampa Mayhem	Tampa Bay	Florida	Larry Sanders Field	2014	2014

== Regular season ==
Teams in the South Conference played 6 games on a double round-robin schedule. Teams in the North Conference played 8 games, primarily within their own division. A win was worth 2 points, a draw worth 1 point, and a loss worth 0 points. There were no bonus points for number of tries or close losses.

Northeast Division
#	Team	Pld	W	D	L	PF	PA	PD	Pts
1	Boston Thirteens	8	7	0	1	430	112	318	14
2	Rhode Island Rebellion	8	5	0	3	342	282	60	10
3	Brooklyn Kings RLFC	8	4	0	4	244	256	-12	8
4	New York Knights	8	3	0	5	178	264	-86	6
5	Connecticut Wildcats	8	1	0	7	138	368	-230	2

Mid-Atlantic Division
#	Team	Pld	W	D	L	PF	PA	PD	Pts
1	Philadelphia Fight	8	8	0	0	448	124	324	16
2	Northern Virginia Eagles	8	6	0	2	430	232	198	12
3	D.C. Slayers	8	3	0	5	320	302	18	6
4	Bucks County Sharks	8	2	0	6	128	435	-307	4
5	Delaware Black Foxes	8	1	0	7	199	482	-321	2

South Conference
#	Team	Pld	W	D	L	PF	PA	PD	Pts
1	Atlanta Rhinos	6	4	0	2	196	184	12	8
2	Central Florida Warriors	6	3	0	3	188	164	24	6
3	Jacksonville Axemen	6	3	0	3	132	174	-42	6
4	Tampa Mayhem	6	2	0	4	172	166	6	4

Final regular-season standings.

== Playoffs ==
For 2015, the USARL further extended the division and conference playoff structure introduced in 2014. In the South Conference, the teams with the best and worst records, and the second- and third-best records, played each other in the South Conference Semi-Finals. The winners met in the South Conference Final. In the North Conference, the teams with the second- and third-best records in each division played each other in the North Conference Division Semi-Finals. The winners played the teams with the best records in their respective divisions in the North Conference Divisional Finals. The winners of the Divisional Finals played in the North Conference Final. The winners of the Conference Finals met in the Championship Final.

Home	Score	Away	Match Information
Home	Score	Away	Date	Venue	Referee	Crowd
North Conference Divisional Semi-Finals
Rhode Island Rebellion	54 - 34	Brooklyn Kings	August 1
Northern Virginia Eagles	76 - 36	D.C. Slayers	August 1
North Conference Divisional Finals
Boston Thirteens	80 - 4	Rhode Island Rebellion	August 8
Philadelphia Fight	60 - 12	Northern Virginia Eagles	August 8
South Conference Semi-Finals
Atlanta Rhinos	32 - 26	Tampa Mayhem	July 25
Central Florida Warriors	44 - 14	Jacksonville Axemen	August 1
Conference Finals
Philadelphia Fight	12 - 20	Boston Thirteens	August 15
Atlanta Rhinos	32 - 28	Central Florida Warriors	August 15
Championship Final
Boston Thirteens	44 - 12	Atlanta Rhinos	August 29
