= 2014 USARL season =

2014 USA Rugby League
- Teams: 11
- Premiers: Philadelphia Fight (3rd title)
- Minor premiers: Philadelphia Fight (2nd title)

The 2014 USARL season was the fourth season of the USA Rugby League competition in the United States. It began on Saturday, May 31, and concluded with the Championship Final on Saturday, August 23. The Philadelphia Fight capped their first perfect season by defeating the Jacksonville Axemen 30-18 in Championship Final, claiming their third USARL Championship.

== Teams ==
This season saw significant changes to the number of teams competing, as well as the structure of the competition.

In the wake of failed unification negotiations with the AMNRL in early 2014, it was announced at the USARL February 16 Annual General Meeting that the competition would be expanded by four teams: Brooklyn, Central Florida, Atlanta, and Tampa Bay. The competition would be split into two conferences (North and South) to accommodate expansion and reduce operating costs. Furthermore, the North Conference would be split into two divisions: North East and North Atlantic.

The Northern Virginia Eagles withdrew from the AMNRL and joined the USARL. They played in the new North Atlantic Division.

North Conference
North East Division
Colors	Club	City	State	Stadium	Foundation	Joined
	Boston Thirteens	Boston	Massachusetts	MIT Steinbrenner Stadium	2009	2011
	Brooklyn Kings RLFC	Brooklyn	New York	Midwood Athletic Complex	2014	2014
	Rhode Island Rebellion	Providence	Rhode Island	Classical High School	2011	2011
North Atlantic Division
Colors	Club	City	State	Stadium	Foundation	Joined
	Baltimore Blues	Baltimore	Maryland	N/A	2012	2012
	Northern Virginia Eagles	Manassas	Virginia	Grizzly Sports Complex	2007	2014
	Philadelphia Fight	Conshohocken	Pennsylvania	A. A. Garthwaite Stadium	1998	2011
	Washington DC Slayers	Washington	Washington	Duke Ellington Field	2003	2011

South Conference
Colors	Club	City	State	Stadium	Foundation	Joined
	Atlanta Rhinos	Atlanta	Georgia	Atlanta Silverbacks Park	2014	2014
	Central Florida Warriors	DeLand	Florida	Spec Martin Stadium	2014	2014
	Jacksonville Axemen	Jacksonville	Florida	Hodges Stadium	2006	2011
	Tampa Mayhem	Tampa Bay	Florida	Larry Sanders Field	2014	2014

== Regular season ==
The South Conference played a double round-robin schedule. The North Conference (except Baltimore) played 7 games per team. A win was worth 2 points, a draw worth 1 point, and a loss worth 0 points. There were no bonus points for number of tries or close losses.

North East Division
#	Team	Pld	W	D	L	PF	PA	PD	Pts
1	Rhode Island Rebellion	7	3	2	2	260	272	-12	8
2	Boston Thirteens	7	3	1	3	302	166	136	7
3	Brooklyn Kings RLFC	7	1	1	5	154	214	-60	3

North Atlantic Division
#	Team	Pld	W	D	L	PF	PA	PD	Pts
1	Philadelphia Fight	7	7	0	0	382	140	242	14
2	Washington D.C. Slayers	7	6	0	1	328	162	166	12
3	Northern Virginia Eagles	7	2	0	5	302	338	-36	4
4	Baltimore Blues	6	0	0	6	80	516	-436	0

South Conference
#	Team	Pld	W	D	L	PF	PA	PD	Pts
1	Jacksonville Axemen	6	6	0	0	220	98	122	12
2	Central Florida Warriors	6	3	0	3	187	174	13	6
3	Atlanta Rhinos	6	2	0	4	136	165	-29	4
4	Tampa Mayhem	6	1	0	5	108	214	-106	2

== Playoffs ==
To accommodate the new conference and division structure, the USARL created a new playoff structure for 2014. In the South Conference, all four teams automatically qualified for the South Conference Playoffs. The teams with the best and worst records played each other, as did the teams with the second- and third-best records. The winners played in the South Conference Championship. In the North Conference, the teams with the first- and second-best record in each division played each other in the North Conference Playoffs. The winners played in the North Conference Championship. The winners of the Conference Championships met in the Championship Final.

Home	Score	Away	Match Information
Home	Score	Away	Date	Venue	Referee	Crowd
North Conference Playoffs
Rhode Island Rebellion	26 – 42	Boston Thirteens	August 2	Classical High School
Philadelphia Fight	76 – 0	Washington D.C. Slayers	August 2	A. A. Garthwaite Stadium
South Conference Playoffs
Jacksonville Axemen	56 – 4	Tampa Mayhem	July 26	Hodges Stadium
Central Florida Warriors	42 – 26	Atlanta Rhinos	July 26	Spec Martin Stadium
Conference Championships
Philadelphia Fight	52 – 26	Boston Thirteens	August 9	A. A. Garthwaite Stadium
Jacksonville Axemen	40 - 12	Central Florida Warriors	August 2	Hodges Stadium
Championship Final
Jacksonville Axemen	18 – 30	Philadelphia Fight	August 23	Hodges Stadium
