= 2017 USARL season =

2017 USARL Season
- League: USA Rugby League
- Teams: 12

2017 season
- Champions: Atlanta Rhinos

The 2017 USA Rugby League season is the seventh season of the USA Rugby League National Premiership competition, and its third as the undisputed top-level rugby league competition in the United States. Twelve teams compete for the USARL Championship. The season began on Saturday, June 3, and concluded with the Championship Final on Saturday, August 26.

== Team changes ==
The Bucks County Sharks and the DC Slayers folded after the 2016 season bringing the number of teams down to 12.

== Regular season ==
Teams in the North Conference play in an eight-round regular season with semi-finals on August 5 and final on August 12. South Conference teams play a six-round regular season with semi-finals on July 29 and final on August 12

Legend
Qualified to Playoffs

Northeast Division
#	Team	Pld	W	D	L	PF	PA	PD	Pts
1	New York Knights (Minor Premiers)	8	8	0	0	380	176	204	16
2	Brooklyn Kings RLFC	8	6	0	2	380	202	178	12
3	White Plains Wombats	8	5	0	3	378	150	228	10
4	Northern Virginia Eagles	8	4	0	4	370	278	92	8
5	Boston 13s	8	3	0	5	0	0	0	6
6	Delaware Black Foxes	8	3	0	5	0	0	0	6
7	Philadelphia Fight	8	2	0	6	0	0	0	4
8	Rhode Island Rebellion	8	0	0	8	0	0	0	0

South Conference
#	Team	Pld	W	D	L	PF	PA	PD	Pts
1	Atlanta Rhinos (champions)	6	5	1	0	0	0	0	11
4	Tampa Mayhem	6	3	1	2	0	0	0	7
3	Jacksonville Axemen	6	2	0	4	0	0	0	4
2	Central Florida Warriors	6	1	0	5	0	0	0	2

=== Week 1 ===
Home	Score	Away	Match information
Home	Score	Away	Date and time (Local)	Venue
White Plains Wombats	58-12	Boston Thirteens	3 Jun 2017, 2:00PM	Blind Brook Elementary School
Northern Virginia Eagles	96-22	Delaware Black Foxes	3 Jun 2017, 4:00PM	Stonewall Park
Rhode Island Rebellion	6-74	New York Knights	3 Jun 2017,
Central Florida Warriors		Tampa Mayhem	3 Jun 2017, 5:00PM	Spec Martin Stadium
Atlanta Rhinos		Jacksonville Axemen	3 Jun 2016, 5:00PM	Atlanta Silverbacks Park
Brooklyn Kings RLFC	42-6	Philadelphia Fight	4 Jun 2016, 6:30PM	Bushwick Inlet Park

== Final ==
The Atlanta Rhinos defeated the New York Knights 32-18 in the grand final to become the 2017 USARL National Champions.
