= Burnside College =

Coordinates: 54.9948°N 1.5199°W

- Wallsend, Tyne and Wear, NE28 7LQ; England

Information
- Type: Foundation school
- Motto: Pride Respect Achievement
- Local authority: North Tyneside
- Department for Education URN: 108640 Tables
- Ofsted: Reports
- Gender: Coeducational
- Age: 11 to 18
- Enrolment: 1069
- Website: https://www.burnsidecollege.org.uk/

Burnside College is a coeducational secondary school and sixth form located in Wallsend, North Tyneside, England.

== History ==
The school was opened on 15 July 1960 by the chairman of Parsons under the name, Wallsend County Technical School. It cost approximately £280,000 for the building work, the furniture and the equipment. On 3 September 1969, the school was renamed as Burnside High School. The school took its current name when it moved into its new buildings in September 2004 that were later inaugurated by Queen Elizabeth II. These new buildings cost around £15 million.

In 2009, The Wallsend Sports Centre began moving into the school grounds, and another new building is currently under construction costing £7 million. Subsequently, the school facilities will improve - the fitness suite in the centre will be larger and a swimming pool will also feature inside the centre. In the Summer of 2010, the building was complete, creating a large swimming pool and fitness suite available for use of local people and students.

== Notable former pupils ==
- Michael Carrick, manager of Middlesbrough F.C. and former midfielder for Manchester United and England
- Vicky Pattison, former Geordie Shore star, and current broadcaster
- Robin Peers, former rugby league player
- Chris Thorman, former rugby league player and current coach of Newcastle Thunderr
- Micky Ward
- Steve Watson, footballer

=== Wallsend Grammar School ===
- Maurice Benn, 1500m runner at the 1968 Olympics
- Richard Gaddes, opera manager
- Brian Laws, professional footballer for Burnley, Middlesbrough and Nottingham Forest; Manager of Grimsby Town, Scunthorpe United, Sheffield Wednesday and Burnley
- Sir George Leitch, CB, OBE, Permanent Secretary from 1974 to 1975 of the British Ministry of Defence
- Ian 'Walter' Fairbairn, musician
- William Fieldhouse CBE, Chairman from 1973 to 1981 of Letraset, and from 1980 to 1983 of Carrington Viyella
- George Rochester FRS, Professor of Physics from 1955 to 1973 at Durham University, discovered the V particles and the kaon or K meson, with Sir Clifford Charles Butler in the 1940s at the University of Manchester
- Group Captain Ivan Whittaker OBE DFC (9 September 1921 - 22 Aug 1979, from Sherburn, County Durham), who flew on the Dambusters Raid as a Flight Engineer with Lancaster AJ-P, with pilot Australian Air Marshal Sir Harold Martin; it was the third to hit the Möhne Dam (he was a Pilot Officer at the time); the mine veered to the left, and exploded at the side of the dam, with the aircraft returning safely; he left the RAF in 1974, being Station Commander from September 1965 to February 1968 of RAF Aldergrove
