= 2016 USARL season =

2016 USARL Season
- League: USA Rugby League
- Duration: 8 rounds (followed by 4 rounds of playoffs)
- Teams: 14

2016 season
- Champions: Philadelphia Fight

The 2016 USA Rugby League season was the sixth season of the USA Rugby League National Premiership competition, and its second as the undisputed top-level rugby league competition in the United States. Fourteen teams competed for the National Championship. The season began on Saturday, June 4, and concluded with the Championship Final on Saturday, August 27, in Boston. The Philadelphia Fight won their fourth USARL Championship, defeating the Jacksonville Axemen 42-20.

== Teams ==
The Connecticut Wildcats folded after the 2015 season, and were replaced by the White Plains Wombats

North Conference
Northeast Division
| Colors | Club | City | State | Stadium | Foundation | Joined |
| | Boston Thirteens | Boston | Massachusetts | Nickerson Field | 2009 | 2011 |
| | Brooklyn Kings RLFC | Brooklyn | New York | Midwood Athletic Complex | 2014 | 2014 |
| | New York Knights | New York City | New York | The Castle Pier 40 | 2001 | 2015 |
| | Rhode Island Rebellion | Providence | Rhode Island | Classical High School | 2011 | 2011 |
| | White Plains Wombats | White Plains | New York | SUNY Purchase College | 2016 | 2016 |
Mid-Atlantic Division
| Colors | Club | City | State | Stadium | Foundation | Joined |
| | Bucks County Sharks | Levittown | Pennsylvania | Falls Township Community Park | 1998 | 2015 |
| | D.C. Slayers | Washington | Washington | Duke Ellington Field | 2003 | 2011 |
| | Delaware Black Foxes | Wilmington | Delaware | Eden Park Stadium | 2015 | 2015 |
| | Northern Virginia Eagles | Manassas | Virginia | Grizzly Sports Complex | 2007 | 2014 |
| | Philadelphia Fight | Conshohocken | Pennsylvania | A. A. Garthwaite Stadium | 1998 | 2011 |

South Conference
| Colors | Club | City | State | Stadium | Foundation | Joined |
| | Atlanta Rhinos | Atlanta | Georgia | Atlanta Silverbacks Park | 2014 | 2014 |
| | Central Florida Warriors | DeLand | Florida | Spec Martin Stadium | 2014 | 2014 |
| | Jacksonville Axemen | Jacksonville | Florida | Hodges Stadium | 2006 | 2011 |
| | Tampa Mayhem | Tampa Bay | Florida | Larry Sanders Field | 2014 | 2014 |

== Regular season ==
Teams in the South Conference played 6 games on a double round-robin schedule. Teams in the North Conference played 8 games, primarily within their own division. A win was worth 2 points, a draw worth 1 point, and a loss worth 0 points. There were no bonus points for number of tries or close losses.

Legend
Qualified to Playoffs Round 2
Qualified to Playoffs Round 1

Northeast Division
| # | Team | Pld | W | D | L | PF | PA | PD | Pts |
| 1 | New York Knights | 8 | 7 | 0 | 1 | 354 | 142 | 212 | 14 |
| 2 | Boston Thirteens | 8 | 5 | 0 | 3 | 336 | 150 | 186 | 10 |
| 3 | Brooklyn Kings RLFC | 8 | 4 | 0 | 4 | 290 | 264 | 26 | 8 |
| 4 | White Plains Wombats | 8 | 4 | 0 | 4 | 286 | 312 | -26 | 8 |
| 5 | Rhode Island Rebellion | 8 | 1 | 0 | 7 | 190 | 402 | -212 | 2 |

Mid-Atlantic Division
| # | Team | Pld | W | D | L | PF | PA | PD | Pts |
| 1 | Philadelphia Fight | 8 | 8 | 0 | 0 | 384 | 72 | 312 | 16 |
| 2 | Delaware Black Foxes | 8 | 5 | 0 | 3 | 390 | 266 | 124 | 10 |
| 3 | Northern Virginia Eagles | 8 | 4 | 0 | 4 | 280 | 246 | 34 | 8 |
| 4 | D.C. Slayers | 8 | 2 | 0 | 6 | 156 | 440 | -284 | 4 |
| 5 | Bucks County Sharks | 8 | 0 | 0 | 8 | 86 | 458 | -372 | 0 |

South Conference
| # | Team | Pld | W | D | L | PF | PA | PD | Pts |
| 1 | Jacksonville Axemen | 6 | 6 | 0 | 0 | 211 | 58 | 153 | 12 |
| 2 | Tampa Mayhem | 6 | 3 | 0 | 3 | 178 | 161 | 17 | 6 |
| 3 | Atlanta Rhinos | 6 | 2 | 1 | 3 | 170 | 234 | -64 | 5 |
| 4 | Central Florida Warriors | 6 | 0 | 1 | 5 | 114 | 234 | -120 | 1 |

Final regular-season standings.

=== Week 1 ===
| Home | Score | Away | Match information |
| Home | Score | Away | Date and time (Local) | Venue |
|---|---|---|---|---|
| Bucks County Sharks | 6-66 | White Plains Wombats | 4 Jun 2016, 1:00PM | Falls Township Park |
| D.C. Slayers | 0-72 | Philadelphia Fight | 4 Jun 2016, 2:00PM | Duke Ellington Field |
| Northern Virginia Eagles | 34-22 | Delaware Black Foxes | 4 Jun 2016, 4:00PM | Grizzly Sports Complex |
| Central Florida Warriors | 28-28 | Atlanta Rhinos | 4 Jun 2016, 6:00PM | Spec Mart Stadium |
| Boston Thirteens | 58-20 | Rhode Island Rebellion | 4 Jun 2016, 7:00PM | Nickerson Field |
| Brooklyn Kings RLFC | 24-26 | New York Knights | 5 Jun 2016, 6:00PM | Bushwick Inlet Park |

=== Week 2 ===
| Home | Score | Away | Match information |
| Home | Score | Away | Date and time (Local) | Venue |
|---|---|---|---|---|
| Bucks County Sharks | 6-96 | Delaware Black Foxes | 11 Jun 2016, 1:00PM | Falls Township Park |
| D.C. Slayers | 12-34 | Brooklyn Kings RLFC | 11 Jun 2016, 3:30PM | Duke Ellington Field |
| Northern Virginia Eagles | 42-24 | Boston Thirteens | 11 Jun 2016, 4:00PM | Grizzly Sports Complex |
| Philadelphia Fight | 60-6 | White Plains Wombats | 11 Jun 2016, 5:00PM | A.A. Garthwaite Stadium |
| Rhode Island Rebellion | 10-46 | New York Knights | 11 Jun 2016, 5:00PM | Brown University |
| Atlanta Rhinos | 22-32 | Jacksonville Axemen | 11 Jun 2016, 5:00PM | Silverback Stadium |
| Tampa Mayhem | 24-16 | Central Florida Warriors | 11 Jun 2016, 5:00PM | Tampa Catholic High School |

=== Week 3 ===
| Home | Score | Away | Match information |
| Home | Score | Away | Date and time (Local) | Venue |
|---|---|---|---|---|
| White Plains Wombats | 90-20 | D.C. Slayers | 18 Jun 2016, 1:00PM | SUNY Purchase College |
| Rhode Island Rebellion | 32-0 | Bucks County Sharks | 18 Jun 2016, 5:00PM | Brown University |
| Jacksonville Axemen | 32-0 | Tampa Mayhem | 18 Jun 2016, 5:00PM | Hodges Stadium |
| New York Knights | 42-6 | Boston Thirteens | 18 Jun 2016, 6:00PM | Randalls Island |
| Delaware Black Foxes | 18-68 | Philadelphia Fight | 18 Jun 2016, 8:00PM | Nickerson Field |
| Brooklyn Kings RLFC | 48-20 | Northern Virginia Eagles | 19 Jun 2016, 6:00PM | Bushwick Inlet Park |

=== Week 4 ===
| Home | Score | Away | Match information |
| Home | Score | Away | Date and time (Local) | Venue |
|---|---|---|---|---|
| Bucks County Sharks | 48-52 | D.C. Slayers | 25 Jun 2016, 1:00PM | Falls Township Park |
| Philadelphia Fight | 68-0 | Northern Virginia Eagles | 25 Jun 2016, 5:00PM | A.A. Garthwaite Stadium |
| Atlanta Rhinos | 30-58 | Tampa Mayhem | 25 Jun 2016, 5:00PM | Silverback Stadium |
| Central Florida Warriors | 12-32 | Jacksonville Axemen | 25 Jun 2016, 6:00PM | Spec Mart Stadium |
| New York Knights | 82-24 | Delaware Black Foxes | 25 Jun 2016, 6:00PM | Pier 40 |
| Boston Thirteens | 32-6 | White Plains Wombats | 25 Jun 2016, 7:00PM | Nickerson Field |
| Brooklyn Kings RLFC | 38-28 | Rhode Island Rebellion | 26 Jun 2016, 6:00PM | Bushwick Inlet Park |

=== Week 5 ===
| Home | Score | Away | Match information |
| Home | Score | Away | Date and time (Local) | Venue |
|---|---|---|---|---|
| White Plains Wombats | 40-28 | Rhode Island Rebellion | 9 Jul 2016, 12:00PM | SUNY Purchase College |
| Northern Virginia Eagles | 74-18 | D.C. Slayers | 9 Jul 2016, 12:00PM | Grizzly Sports Complex |
| Philadelphia Fight | 30-22 | New York Knights | 9 Jul 2016, 5:00PM | A.A. Garthwaite Stadium |
| Jacksonville Axemen | 48-6 | Atlanta Rhinos | 9 Jul 2016, 5:00PM | Hodges Stadium |
| Central Florida Warriors | 24-58 | Tampa Mayhem | 9 Jul 2016, 6:00PM | Spec Mart Stadium |
| Delaware Black Foxes | 64-6 | Bucks County Sharks | 9 Jul 2016, 8:00PM | Eden Park Stadium |
| Brooklyn Kings RLFC | 18-50 | Boston Thirteens | 10 Jul 2016, 6:00PM | Bushwick Inlet Park |

=== Week 6 ===
| Home | Score | Away | Match information |
| Home | Score | Away | Date and time (Local) | Venue |
|---|---|---|---|---|
| New York Knights | 52-16 | Rhode Island Rebellion | 16 Jul 2016 |
| Bucks County Sharks | 0-70 | Northern Virginia Eagles | 16 Jul 2016, 1:00PM | Falls Township Park |
| D.C. Slayers | 24-70 | Delaware Black Foxes | 16 Jul 2016, 2:00PM | Duke Ellington Field |
| White Plains Wombats | 50-46 | Brooklyn Kings RLFC | 16 Jul 2016, 3:30PM | SUNY Purchase College |
| Tampa Mayhem | 6-19 | Jacksonville Axemen | 16 Jul 2016, 5:00PM | Tampa Catholic High School |
| Atlanta Rhinos | 44-22 | Central Florida Warriors | 16 Jul 2016, 5:00PM | Silverback Stadium |
| Boston Thirteens | 16-22 | Philadelphia Fight | 16 Jul 2016, 7:00PM | Nickerson Field |

=== Week 7 ===
| Home | Score | Away | Match information |
| Home | Score | Away | Date and time (Local) | Venue |
|---|---|---|---|---|
| Boston Thirteens | 32-0 | D.C. Slayers | 23 Jul 2016 | Nickerson Field |
| Delaware Black Foxes | 50-30 | Northern Virginia Eagles | 23 Jul 2016, 11:00AM | Eden Park Stadium |
| White Plains Wombats | 12-62 | New York Knights | 23 Jul 2016, 12:00PM | SUNY Purchase College |
| Philadelphia Fight | 48-0 | Bucks County Sharks | 23 Jul 2016, 5:00PM | A.A. Garthwaite Stadium |
| Rhode Island Rebellion | 56-62 | Brooklyn Kings RLFC | 23 Jul 2016, 5:00PM | Brown University |

=== Week 8 ===
| Home | Score | Away | Match information |
| Home | Score | Away | Date and time (Local) | Venue |
|---|---|---|---|---|
| New York Knights | 22-20 | Brooklyn Kings RLFC | 30 Jul 2016 |
| D.C. Slayers | 30-20 | Bucks County Sharks | 30 Jul 2016, 2:00PM | Duke Ellington Field |
| Northern Virginia Eagles | 10-16 | Philadelphia Fight | 30 Jul 2016, 4:00PM | Grizzly Sports Complex |
| Tampa Mayhem | 34-40 | Atlanta Rhinos | 30 Jul 2016, 5:00PM | Tampa Catholic High School |
| Jacksonville Axemen | 48-12 | Central Florida Warriors | 30 Jul 2016, 5:00PM | Hodges Stadium |
| Rhode Island Rebellion | 0-106 | Boston Thirteens | 30 Jul 2016, 5:00PM | Brown University |
| Delaware Black Foxes | 46-16 | White Plains Wombats | 30 Jul 2016, 8:00PM | Eden Park Stadium |

== Playoffs ==
In the South Conference, the teams with the best and worst records, and the second- and third-best records, played each other in the South Conference Semi-Finals. The winners met in the South Conference Final. In the North Conference, the teams with the second-and third-best records in each division played each other in the North Conference Division Semi-Finals. The winners played the teams with the best records in their respective divisions in the North Conference Divisional Finals. The Winners of the Divisional Finals played in the North Conference Final. The winners of the Conference Finals met in the Championship Final.

=== Round 1 ===
| Home | Score | Away | Match Information |
| Home | Score | Away | Date | Venue |
|---|---|---|---|---|
North Conference Divisional Semi-Finals
| Boston Thirteens | 64 - 40 | Brooklyn Kings RLFC | August 6 |
| Delaware Black Foxes | 24-22 | Northern Virginia Eagles | August 6 |
South Conference Semi-Finals
| Jacksonville Axemen | 38-14 | Central Florida Warriors | August 6 |
| Tampa Mayhem | 26-16 | Atlanta Rhinos | August 6 |

=== Round 2 ===
| Home | Score | Away | Match Information |
| Home | Score | Away | Date | Venue |
|---|---|---|---|---|
North Conference Divisional Finals
| New York Knights | 12-19 | Boston Thirteens | August 13 |
| Philadelphia Fight | 76-6 | Delaware Black Foxes | August 13 |

=== Conference finals ===
| Home | Score | Away | Match Information |
| Home | Score | Away | Date | Venue |
|---|---|---|---|---|
North Championship
| Boston Thirteens | 24 - 33 | Philadelphia Fight | August 20 |
South Championship
| Jacksonville Axemen | 38-28 | Atlanta Rhinos | August 13 |

=== Championship final ===
| Home | Score | Away | Match Information |
| Home | Score | Away | Date | Venue |
|---|---|---|---|---|
National Championship
| Philadelphia Fight | 42 - 20 | Jacksonville Axemen | August 27 | Nickerson Field |

== All-Star Game ==
After the conclusion of the 2016 season, the USARL held the first annual All-Star Game, with two teams made up of the best players from each conference.

| Home | Score | Away | Match Information |
| Home | Score | Away | Date | Venue |
|---|---|---|---|---|
All-Star Game
| South | 38-32 | North | October 22 | Tampa Catholic High School |
