= 2013 USARL season =

2013 USA Rugby League
- Teams: 6
- Premiers: Philadelphia Fight (2nd title)
- Minor premiers: Philadelphia Fight (1st title)
- Matches played: 27

The 2013 USARL season was the third season of the USA Rugby League (USARL). The 2013 season kicked off on Saturday, June 1, and ended with the Championship Final on Saturday, August 24, in Conshohocken, Pennsylvania. The Philadelphia Fight won a double, capturing their second USARL major premiership and their first USARL minor premiership.

== Teams ==
The USARL had planned to split 8 teams into 2 conferences to reduce travel costs. However, Oneida FC and the New Haven Warriors folded shortly before the beginning of the season, leaving the league with just 6 teams. Given the reduced number of teams, the USARL decided to retain the single table structure.

Colors	Club	City	State	Stadium	Foundation	Joined
	Baltimore Blues	Baltimore	Maryland	N/A	2012	2012
	Boston Thirteens	Boston	Massachusetts	Steinbrenner Stadium	2009	2011
	Jacksonville Axemen	Jacksonville	Florida	Hodges Stadium	2006	2011
	Philadelphia Fight	Conshohocken	Pennsylvania	A. A. Garthwaite Stadium	1998	2011
	Rhode Island Rebellion	Providence	Rhode Island	Classical High School	2011	2011
	Washington DC Slayers	Washington	Washington	Duke Ellington Field	2003	2011

== Regular season ==
Teams qualified for the playoffs based on points, with a win counting for 2 points, a draw for 1, and a loss for 0. There were no bonus points for tries or close losses. Tiebreaker order was (1) head-to-head points, (2) head-to-head aggregate score, and (3) overall point differential.

2013 USARL season
#	Team	Pld	W	D	L	PF	PA	PD	Pts
1	Philadelphia Fight	8	7	0	1	402	152	250	14
2	Jacksonville Axemen	8	7	0	1	412	136	276	14
3	Rhode Island Rebellion	8	4	0	4	366	310	56	8
4	Washington D.C. Slayers	8	3	0	5	349	212	137	6
5	Boston Thirteens	8	3	0	5	252	390	-138	6
6	Baltimore Blues	8	0	0	8	44	625	-581	0

Source: USARL website.

The Fight outscored the Axemen 60–58 in aggregate over their two matches, giving the Fight the minor premiership. The Slayers qualified for fourth place over the Thirteens on point differential.

== Playoffs ==
The playoffs consisted of a two-round single-elimination tournament. The four teams with the most points competed in a semi-final round, with the two winners going on to the Championship Final. In the semi-final round, the first-place team hosted the fourth-place, and the second-place team hosted the third-place.

Home	Score	Away	Match Information
Home	Score	Away	Date	Venue
SEMI-FINALS
Jacksonville Axemen	44 - 12	Rhode Island Rebellion	August 10, 2013	Hodges Stadium, Jacksonville
Philadelphia Fight	52 - 6	Washington DC Slayers	August 10, 2013	A. A. Garthwaite Stadium, Conshohocken
CHAMPIONSHIP FINAL
Philadelphia Fight	28 - 22	Jacksonville Axemen	August 24, 2013	A. A. Garthwaite Stadium, Conshohocken
