= Kyle Winter =

American rugby footballer

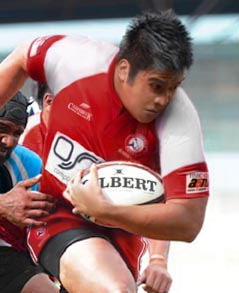
- Winter in December 2014
- Full name: Kyle Johan Winter
- Born: 20 September 1974 (age 52) Poughkeepsie, New York, U.S.
- Height: 182 cm (6 ft 0 in)
- Weight: 106.5 kg (235 lb)
- School: Franklin D. Roosevelt High School
- University: Northeastern University

Rugby union career
- Position(s): prop, utility forward
Amateur team(s)
Years	Team	Apps	(Points)
1992–1993	Boston University		
1993–1996	SUNY New Paltz		
1996–1999	Northeastern University		
Senior career
Years	Team	Apps	(Points)
2002–2016	Mystic River	84	(15)
- Correct as of 3 March 2022
International career
Years	Team	Apps	(Points)
2009	Indonesia XV	1	(5)
2009–2010	Indonesia	3	(0)
- Rugby league career

Playing information
- Position: Prop, Lock
Club
Years	Team	Pld	T	G	FG	P
2009–2012	Boston Thirteens	19	6	0	0	24
2012	Oneida FC	3	1	0	0	4
	Total	22	7	0	0	28
Representative
Years	Team	Pld	T	G	FG	P
2010	New England	1	0	0	0	0

Kyle Johan Winter (born 20 September 1974) is an American Indonesian former rugby union player. He played senior level Division I rugby with the Mystic River Rugby Club in the American Rugby Premiership and has represented Indonesia on the national level. He also played rugby league with the Boston Thirteens in the USARL.

== Early life and education ==
Winter grew up in Hyde Park, New York and graduated from Franklin Delano Roosevelt High School in 1992, where he was a member of the varsity soccer and rowing teams. While in high school, he also represented the Hudson Valley in rowing in the Empire State Games.

Upon graduation, he enrolled at Boston University, where he was first introduced to rugby after failing to make the rowing team. At B.U., he was also a member of the Lambda Chi Alpha fraternity, but transferred to SUNY New Paltz after one year. There, he played rugby for the newly promoted Hawks in their first ever season in Division 1 in 1993 up until their playoff run in 1996. He then attended Northeastern University, playing rugby for the Northeastern University Rugby Club throughout the remainder of his college career until his graduation in 1999.

== Rugby career ==
After college, Winter played briefly with Clontarf Rugby in Dublin, Ireland, making just a handful of appearances as a utility forward with their junior sides before the 2001 foot-and-mouth outbreak halted the majority of the 2001 rugby season. Following the lifting of the travel ban, Winter joined Bus Éireann RFC in the Leinster junior league for the remainder of their season.

=== Mystic River Rugby ===
Upon returning to the United States, Winter began his career with Mystic River in 2002, where he was a prop / utility forward. Secondary roles with the club included second row and the number 8 position. He played twelve years with the Mystics helping them to five Northeast Championships and five straight USA Rugby Division I Sweet 16 tournaments between 2008 and 2012, including three trips to the National Quarter-Finals. Due to injuries during the 2015–2016 season, Winter saw his playing time split between the Mystic's D1 side and the D2 Mystic Barbarians, suiting up for only two league matches that year.

=== Indonesia ===
Winter, whose father emigrated from Bandung, Indonesia, was named to the 42-man training squad for the Indonesian National Rugby Team (known as the Rhinos) after a trial session while in Bali in 2008. In 2009 he attended the national training camp held in Jakarta. He first wore the Indonesian jersey in June 2009 when he was selected to play for the Indonesian XV squad in the inaugural Minister's Cup, scoring a try and earning a position on the 28-man roster that would travel to Manila, the Philippines to compete in the HSBC Asian 5 Nations Tournament, part of the Rugby World Cup qualifier tournaments for countries in the Asian Rugby Football Union.

On 1 July 2009, Winter made his international test match debut for Indonesia as the starting loose-head prop against Guam. Later that week, he would again start in the front row against Iran in the tournament consolation final, where the Rhinos would lose 48-13 and place 4th in the tournament.

=== Boston Thirteens ===
In 2009, Winter signed with the Boston Thirteens in the American National Rugby League where he played prop, though he was forced to miss much of the second half of the season due to national team duties with Indonesia. Winter re-signed with Boston for the 2010 season, suiting up for all six matches at prop. He continued with the Boston Thirteens after the AMNRL/USARL split in 2011 as a utility forward. The following year, he was traded to Oneida FC, playing in just three matches before retiring from rugby league after the 2012 season.

=== New England Immortals ===
Winter was named to the New England Immortals RLFC, a representative side consisting of the top players from the New England area. He made his rugby league rep side debut in July 2010 in an exhibition match against Canada at the 2010 AMNRL "War at the Shore" tournament.

== Personal life ==
In 2015, Winter was hired as the graphic designer to lead the rebranding campaign of the Lebanese Rugby League Federation, which included a new design for the Lebanese national team crest in the lead up to their 2017 Rugby League World Cup run.

His father and uncle both represented Indonesia in association football and water polo respectively.
