= 2011 USARL season =

2011 USA Rugby League
- Teams: 8
- Premiers: Philadelphia Fight (1st title)
- Minor premiers: Jacksonville Axemen (1st title)
- Wooden spoon: Oneida FC
- Matches played: 35

The 2011 USARL season was the inaugural season of the USA Rugby League (USARL). The league was formed in January 2011 as a breakaway competition from the American National Rugby League (AMNRL). The regular season kicked off on June 4 and ended on July 30; the Jacksonville Axemen won the minor premiership with the best regular season record. The first round of playoffs were played on August 13, 2011, with the New Haven Warriors and Philadelphia Fight winning the round. The league's Grand Final took place on August 27 between the Philadelphia Fight and the New Haven Warriors. Philadelphia won 28–26, receiving their first national championship.

== Teams ==
USARL teams
Team	Stadium	City/Area	Foundation	Joined
Boston Thirteens	Moakley Stadium	Boston, Massachusetts	2009	2011
Jacksonville Axemen	Hodges Stadium	Jacksonville, Florida	2006	2011
New Haven Warriors	Ken Strong Stadium	New Haven, Connecticut	2006	2011
New Jersey Turnpike Titans	Cochran Stadium	Jersey City, New Jersey	2011	2011
Oneida FC	Steinbrenner Stadium	Boston, Massachusetts	2011	2011
Philadelphia Fight	Garthwaite Stadium	Philadelphia, Pennsylvania	1998	2011
Rhode Island Rebellion	Classical High School	Providence, Rhode Island	2011	2011
Washington DC Slayers	Duke Ellington Field	Washington, D.C.	2003	2011

== Season table ==
2011 USARL season
#	Team	Pld	W	D	L	PF	PA	PD	Pts
1	Jacksonville Axemen	8	7	0	1	334	88	246	14
2	Washington D.C. Slayers	8	7	0	1	302	145	157	14
3	Philadelphia Fight	8	6	0	2	335	128	207	12
4	New Haven Warriors	8	5	0	3	296	172	124	10
5	Rhode Island Rebellion	8	3	0	5	208	198	10	6
6	Boston Thirteens	8	2	0	6	114	324	−210	4
7	New Jersey Turnpike Titans	8	1	0	7	134	382	−248	2
8	Oneida FC	8	1	0	7	118	404	−286	2

=== Ladder progression ===
- Numbers highlighted in green indicate that the team finished the round inside the top 4.
- Numbers highlighted in blue indicates the team finished first on the ladder in that round.
- Numbers highlighted in red indicates the team finished last place on the ladder in that round.

	Team	1	2	3	4	5	6	7	8
1	Jacksonville Axemen	2	4	6	6	8	10	12	14
2	Washington D.C. Slayers	2	4	6	8	10	12	12	14
3	Philadelphia Fight	2	4	6	8	8	10	12	12
4	New Haven Warriors	0	2	4	4	6	6	8	10
5	Rhode Island Rebellion	0	0	0	2	4	4	4	6
6	Boston Thirteens	0	0	0	0	0	2	4	4
7	New Jersey Turnpike Titans	2	2	2	2	2	2	2	2
8	Oneida FC	0	0	0	2	2	2	2	2

== Regular season ==
The inaugural USARL season opened with a pre-season rugby league nines tournament. Seven of the top-tier teams participated, with the Philadelphia Fight fielding two teams. Additionally, two developmental teams (the Orange County Outlaws and the Utah Avalanche) participated, along with a West Chester University student team and the visiting New Zealand Police invitational side. The New Zealand Police won the tournament over the New Haven Warriors.

For the regular season, each team played home and away against six teams once, and one team twice, in an eight-round home and away season. Teams qualified for the playoffs based on point differential, with a win counting for 2 points, a draw for 1, a loss for 0, and a forfeit for −2. The Jacksonville Axemen won the minor premiers with the best season record.

=== Round 1 ===
Home	Score	Away	Match Information
Home	Score	Away	Date and Time (Local)	Venue
Jacksonville Axemen	48–10	New Haven Warriors	June 4, 5:00 pm	Hodges Stadium
Boston Thirteens	16–38	New Jersey Turnpike Titans	June 4, 7:00 pm	Charlestown Highschool Stadium
Rhode Island Rebellion	4–46	Philadelphia Fight	June 4, 8:00 pm	Classical Highschool Stadium
Oneida FC	10–54	Washington D.C. Slayers	June 4, 9:00 pm	Charlestown Highschool Stadium

=== Round 2 ===
Home	Score	Away	Match Information
Home	Score	Away	Date and Time (Local)	Venue
New Jersey Turnpike Titans	22–30	Washington D.C. Slayers	June 11	Lincoln Park
New Haven Warriors	36–28	Rhode Island Rebellion	June 11, 3:00pm	Ken Strong Stadium
Jacksonville Axemen	52–10	Boston Thirteens	June 12, 9:00 am	Hodges Stadium
Philadelphia Fight	104–0	Oneida FC	June 11, 5:00pm	A. A. Garthwaite Stadium

=== Round 3 ===
Home	Score	Away	Match Information
Home	Score	Away	Date and Time (Local)	Venue
Oneida FC	10–54	Jacksonville Axemen	June 18, 1:00pm	MIT Steinbrenner Stadium
Washington D.C. Slayers	30–24	Rhode Island Rebellion	June 18, 1:00pm	Duke Ellington Field
Boston Thirteens	0–52	New Haven Warriors	June 18, 3:00pm	MIT Steinbrenner Stadium
Philadelphia Fight	30–22	New Jersey Turnpike Titans	June 18, 5:00pm	A. A. Garthwaite Stadium

=== Round 4 ===
Home	Score	Away	Match Information
Home	Score	Away	Date and Time (Local)	Venue
Oneida FC	36–26	Boston Thirteens	June 25, 1:00pm	MIT Steinbrenner Stadium
Washington D.C. Slayers	28–16	New Haven Warriors	June 25, 2:30pm	Duke Ellington Field
Philadelphia Fight	14–12	Jacksonville Axemen	June 25, 5:00pm	A. A. Garthwaite Stadium
Rhode Island Rebellion	30–16	New Jersey Turnpike Titans	June 25, 8:00pm	Classical Highschool Stadium

=== Round 5 ===
Home	Score	Away	Match Information
Home	Score	Away	Date and Time (Local)	Venue
New Jersey Turnpike Titans	6–62	Jacksonville Axemen	July 9	TBD
Washington D.C. Slayers	24–13	Philadelphia Fight	July 9, 2:30pm	Duke Ellington Field
New Haven Warriors	60–12	Oneida FC	July 9, 3:00pm	Ken Strong Stadium
Rhode Island Rebellion	48–0	Boston Thirteens	July 9, 8:00pm	Classical Highschool Stadium

=== Round 6 ===
Home	Score	Away	Match Information
Home	Score	Away	Date and Time (Local)	Venue
New Jersey Turnpike Titans	16–62	Washington D.C. Slayers	July 16	New Jersey 7's Tournament
Boston Thirteens	32–22	Oneida FC	July 16, 1:00pm	MIT Steinbrenner Stadium
New Haven Warriors	22–28	Philadelphia Fight	July 16, 3:00pm	Ken Strong Stadium
Jacksonville Axemen	30–4	Rhode Island Rebellion	July 16, 5:00pm	Hodges Stadium

=== Round 7 ===
Home	Score	Away	Match Information
Home	Score	Away	Date and Time (Local)	Venue
Boston Thirteens	32–18	Oneida FC	July 23, 1:00pm	MIT Steinbrenner Stadium
Washington D.C. Slayers	16–36	Jacksonville Axemen	July 23, 2:30pm	Duke Ellington Field
Philadelphia Fight	84–4	New Jersey Turnpike Titans	July 23, 5:00pm	A. A. Garthwaite Stadium
Rhode Island Rebellion	18–32	New Haven Warriors	July 23, 8:00pm	Classical Highschool Stadium

=== Round 8 ===
Home	Score	Away	Match Information
Home	Score	Away	Date and Time (Local)	Venue
Oneida FC	8–46	Rhode Island Rebellion	July 30, 1:00pm	MIT Steinbrenner Stadium
New Haven Warriors	68–10	New Jersey Turnpike Titans	July 30, 3:00pm	Ken Strong Stadium
Boston Thirteens	8–58	Washington D.C. Slayers	July 30, 3:00pm	MIT Steinbrenner Stadium
Jacksonville Axemen	40–16	Philadelphia Fight	July 30, 5:00pm	Hodges Stadium

== Playoffs ==
The playoffs consist of a two-round single-elimination tournament in August. The season's top four teams competed in a semi-final round, with the two winners going on to the Championship Final. In the first round on August 13, the first-place Jacksonville Axemen hosted fourth-place New Haven Warriors at Hodges Stadium, and the second-place Washington D.C. Slayers hosted the third-place Philadelphia Fight at Duke Ellington Field. The games were won by New Haven and Philadelphia, who went on to the inaugural Grand Final on August 27. Philadelphia defeated New Haven 28–26, winning their first ever national championship.

Home	Score	Away	Match Information
Home	Score	Away	Date and Time (Local)	Venue	Referee	Crowd
SEMI-FINALS
Jacksonville Axemen	4–13	New Haven Warriors	August 13, 2011	Hodges Stadium
Washington D.C. Slayers	18–32	Philadelphia Fight	August 13, 2011	Duke Ellington Field
CHAMPIONSHIP FINAL
Philadelphia Fight	28–26	New Haven Warriors	August 28, 2011	A. A. Garthwaite Stadium
