= George Rochester =

British physicist

George Dixon Rochester
- Born: 4 February 1908; Wallsend, England, United Kingdom
- Died: 26 December 2001 (aged 93); Durham, England, United Kingdom
- Known for: Co-discovery, with Sir Clifford Charles Butler, of the kaon
- Spouse: Idaline Bayliffe
- Children: Dorothy and Anthony
- Scientific career
- Fields: Physics
- Workplaces: Stockholm University; University of California, Berkeley; Victoria University of Manchester; Durham University

George Dixon Rochester, FRS (4 February 1908 – 26 December 2001) was a British physicist known for having co-discovered, with Sir Clifford Charles Butler, a subatomic particle called the kaon.

== Biography ==
Rochester was born in Wallsend, the only child of Thomas Rochester, a blacksmith, who was later a toolsmith in the Swan Hunter shipyard, and his wife, Ellen, née Dixon.

After attending local primary schools, Rochester went to Wallsend Grammar School in 1920, where he did well in chemistry and physics, and gained a scholarship to Armstrong College, Newcastle. He graduated with first-class honours in physics in 1930 (delayed by an attack of measles), under the guidance of W E Curtis (later an FRS). He gained a postgraduate scholarship and joined Curtis’s research group in 1931. After an unsatisfying start, working on the band spectrum of helium, he and fellow-student H. G. Howell decided between them to work on the spectra of heavy diatomic molecules, in particular compounds of tin, lead, bismuth, antimony, thallium and manganese. A great deal was accomplished while Curtis was on extended holiday, the results of which appeared in Rochester's first paper. The analysis of these and similar results occupied the two colleagues and other collaborators for the next five years. The consequence for Rochester was the winning of two awards which enabled him to spend 1934-5 working on band spectra with Professor Erik Hulthén at the Physical Institute of the University of Stockholm. During his time at Armstrong College, he had gained an MSc in 1932 and a PhD in 1937.

Curtis suggested that Rochester apply for a Commonwealth Fund Fellowship. After an interview in London he was awarded it for the years 1935-37 at the University of California, Berkeley. He set sail in July 1935 from Liverpool to New York on the Samaria. He worked on halide spectra using excellent equipment, but also saw work underway on the development of the cyclotron, and met many notable visitors including: Niels Bohr, J A Wheeler, R A Millikan, Arthur Compton and John Cockcroft.

In 1937, Rochester crossed the USA to New York, where he boarded the Queen Mary en route to Southampton, arriving on 14 June. He attended an interview and was appointed assistant lecturer at the Victoria University of Manchester under Lawrence Bragg, just before Bragg moved to the National Physical Laboratory in Teddington. The post of Langworthy Professor of Physics was next filled by Patrick (later Lord) Blackett, whose group Rochester joined in 1938, this time to work on cosmic rays.

War came in 1939, and he was sent to the newly-operational radar station at Staxton Wold, near Scarborough. But after a few months he was recalled to Manchester to help run the two-year intensive degree courses in what was one of just a few physics departments kept open during the war. He was also University Fire Officer, work done mainly in the evenings and at weekends. This left time for him and cosmic ray physicist Lajos Jánossy to undertake research on the penetration of cosmic rays at sea level. This research continued after the war, initially still with Jánossy, but later with Clifford Butler, and led eventually to the discovery of heavy V particles, later determined to be K+ and K0 (kaons).

Blackett moved from Manchester to Imperial College in 1953, leaving Rochester as acting director of the Physical Laboratories, until he was offered the Chair in Physics at Durham. He held this position from 1955 until the end of his career, and shaped the Durham department during this time.

Rochester’s contributions to physics are commemorated by the Rochester building which he carefully designed, and the home of the physics department at Durham; the Rochester Prize for the top performing first year Science undergraduate student; and the annual Rochester Lecture. He was elected a Fellow of the Royal Society in 1958. In the period 1955 to 1966, Rochester was nominated 22 times for a Nobel Prize in Physics, by such eminent scientists as Blackett (seven times), Cockcroft (four times) and Chadwick.

=== Family ===
George Rochester met his future wife, Idaline Bayliffe, when they were undergraduates at Durham through the Student Christian Movement (SCM), of which she was secretary. "[Ida] had studied English at Durham: in Rochester's subsequent professorial career, when he returned junior lecturers' research papers 'duly corrected', it was not generally known that it was she who had had a hand in correcting their prose".

They were engaged in 1935, just before George sailed to the USA, and married on 18 April 1938 at John Street Methodist Church, Cullercoats. They had two children: Dorothy, born in 1942, and Anthony in 1946. Ida, like her husband, “was a pillar of the local Methodist Church, from which they gained much inner strength”. She outlived him by six days.

George Dixon Rochester died in Durham of heart failure on 26 December 2001.
