= Sean Rutgerson =

Professional RL coach & former South Africa international rugby league footballer

Personal information
- Full name: Sean Rutgerson
- Born: 9 February 1978 (age 48)
- Height: 191 cm (6 ft 3 in)
- Weight: 105 kg (16 st 7 lb; 231 lb)

Playing information
- Position: Prop, Second-row
Club
Years	Team	Pld	T	G	FG	P
1998–99	North Sydney	12	0	0	0	0
2000–03	Canberra Raiders	56	1	0	0	4
2004–06	Salford	74	5	0	0	20
2009	Jacksonville	8	0	0	0	0
	Total	150	6	0	0	24
Representative
Years	Team	Pld	T	G	FG	P
2000	South Africa	3	0	0	0	0

Coaching information
Club
Years	Team	Gms	W	D	L	W%
2009	Jacksonville
Representative
Years	Team	Gms	W	D	L	W%
2018–25	United States	9	5	1	3	56
2024–25	United States (Women)	2	1	0	1	50
- Source: As of 18 June 2026

Sean Rutgerson (born 9 February 1978) is the former head coach of the United States and a former professional rugby league footballer. His primary position was as prop, but he also played in the second-row. Over his career, Rutgerson played for the North Sydney Bears and the Canberra Raiders in the Australian National Rugby League, the Salford City Reds in the Super League and the Jacksonville Axemen in the AMNRL.

== Playing career ==
Rutgerson started his professional career in Australia with the North Sydney, where he played. After two years at North Sydney, he moved to the Canberra Raiders where he spent four years and scored his first try at the top level.

He signed for Salford City Reds in 2004 and played three seasons in Super League. He then moved to the US, where he played for the Jacksonville Axemen and also took on a coaching role at the club.

In the 2000 Rugby League World Cup Rutgerson represented South Africa. In all three games for South Africa, Rutgerson started in the second-row, rather than his typical position as prop.

== Coaching ==
Rutgerson was appointed assistant coach of the USA national team under Brian McDermott in 2015, eventually taking over from McDermott as head coach in 2018. Rutgerson, who was also head coach of the United States women's team, stepped down from both roles at the end of 2025.
