= 2012 USARL season =

2012 USA Rugby League
- Teams: 8
- Premiers: Jacksonville Axemen (1st title)
- Minor premiers: Jacksonville Axemen (2nd title)
- Matches played: 35

The 2012 USARL season was the second season of the USA Rugby League (USARL). The 2012 season was an 8-team competition with the addition of the Baltimore Blues and departure of the New Jersey Turnpike Titans. The season began on June 2, and ended with the Championship Final on August 25 in Boston, Massachusetts. The Jacksonville Axemen completed the USARL's first perfect season, capturing the Axemen's first USARL Championship and second minor premiership.

== Teams ==
Colors	Club	City	State	Stadium	Foundation	Joined
	Baltimore Blues	Baltimore	Maryland	N/A	2012	2012
	Boston Thirteens	Boston	Massachusetts	MIT Steinbrenner Stadium	2009	2011
	Jacksonville Axemen	Jacksonville	Florida	Hodges Stadium	2006	2011
	New Haven Warriors	New Haven	Connecticut	Ken Strong Stadium	2006	2011
	Oneida FC	Cambridge	Massachusetts	Steinbrenner Stadium	2011	2011
	Philadelphia Fight	Conshohocken	Pennsylvania	A. A. Garthwaite Stadium	1998	2011
	Rhode Island Rebellion	Providence	Rhode Island	Classical High School	2011	2011
	Washington DC Slayers	Washington	Washington	Duke Ellington Field	2003	2011

== Season table ==
2012 USARL season
#	Team	Pld	W	D	L	PF	PA	PD	Pts
1	Jacksonville Axemen	8	8	0	0	398	98	300	16
2	Philadelphia Fight	8	6	0	2	458	116	342	12
3	Boston Thirteens	8	6	0	2	442	132	310	12
4	Washington D.C. Slayers	8	5	0	3	275	188	87	10
5	Rhode Island Rebellion	8	4	0	4	358	291	67	8
6	Oneida FC	8	2	0	6	154	498	-344	4
7	New Haven Warriors	8	1	0	7	122	354	-232	2
8	Baltimore Blues	8	0	0	8	60	590	-530	0

=== Ladder progression ===
- Numbers highlighted in green indicate that the team finished the round inside the top 4.
- Numbers highlighted in blue indicates the team finished first on the ladder in that round.
- Numbers highlighted in red indicates the team finished last place on the ladder in that round.

	Team	1	2	3	4	5	6	7	8
1	Jacksonville Axemen	2	4	6	8	10	12	14	16
2	Philadelphia Fight	2	4	6	8	8	10	12	12
3	Boston Thirteens	2	4	6	6	8	8	10	12
4	Washington D.C. Slayers	0	2	2	2	4	6	8	10
5	Rhode Island Rebellion	0	0	2	4	4	6	6	8
6	Oneida FC	0	0	0	2	4	4	4	4
7	New Haven Warriors	2	2	2	2	2	2	2	2
8	Baltimore Blues	0	0	0	0	0	0	0	0

== Regular season ==
The league played a single round-round schedule, plus one additional game per team. Teams qualified for the playoffs based on point differential, with a win counting for 2 points, a draw for 1, a loss for 0, and a forfeit for −2 (or greater). All fixtures sourced from the USARL.

=== Round 1 ===
Home	Score	Away	Match Information
Home	Score	Away	Date and Time (Local)	Venue
Baltimore Blues	0 – 48	New Haven Warriors	June 2	TBA
Oneida FC	8 – 68	Boston Thirteens	June 2 @ 2pm	MIT Steinbrenner Stadium
Philadelphia Fight	78 – 4	Rhode Island Rebellion	June 2	TBA
Washington D.C. Slayers	18 – 48	Jacksonville Axemen	June 2	Duke Ellington Field

=== Round 2 ===
Home	Score	Away	Match Information
Home	Score	Away	Date and Time (Local)	Venue
Jacksonville Axemen	62 – 10	Oneida FC	June 9	Hodges Stadium
Rhode Island Rebellion	10 – 41	Washington D.C. Slayers	June 9	Classical High School
New Haven Warriors	16 – 46	Boston Thirteens	June 9	Ken Strong Stadium
Baltimore Blues	6 – 86	Philadelphia Fight	June 9	TBA

=== Round 3 ===
Home	Score	Away	Match Information
Home	Score	Away	Date and Time (Local)	Venue
Jacksonville Axemen	48 – 10	Washington D.C. Slayers	June 16	Hodges Stadium
New Haven Warriors	8 – 78	Rhode Island Rebellion	June 16	Ken Strong Stadium
Philadelphia Fight	82 – 6	Baltimore Blues	June 16	Dixon Field, Cabrini College
Boston Thirteens	64 – 6	Oneida FC	June 16 @ 2pm	MIT Steinbrenner Stadium

=== Round 4 ===
Home	Score	Away	Match Information
Home	Score	Away	Date and Time (Local)	Venue
Oneida FC	68 – 28	Baltimore Blues	June 23 @ 3pm	MIT Steinbrenner Stadium
Boston Thirteens	32 – 36	Jacksonville Axemen	June 23 @ 1pm	MIT Steinbrenner Stadium
Rhode Island Rebellion	54 – 24	New Haven Warriors	June 23	Classical High School
Washington D.C. Slayers	18 – 36	Philadelphia Fight	June 23	Duke Ellington Field

=== Round 5 ===
Home	Score	Away	Match Information
Home	Score	Away	Date and Time (Local)	Venue
Oneida FC	44 – 20	New Haven Warriors	June 30 @ 3pm	MIT Steinbrenner Stadium
Philadelphia Fight	12 – 32	Jacksonville Axemen	June 30	Dixon Field, Cabrini College
Boston Thirteens	58 – 22	Rhode Island Rebellion	June 30 @ 1pm	MIT Steinbrenner Stadium
Baltimore Blues	4 – 50	Washington D.C. Slayers	June 30	TBA

=== Round 6 ===
Home	Score	Away	Match Information
Home	Score	Away	Date and Time (Local)	Venue
Jacksonville Axemen	88 – 0	Baltimore Blues	July 14	Hodges Stadium
Washington D.C. Slayers	34 – 30	Boston Thirteens	July 14	Duke Ellington Field
New Haven Warriors	6 – 72	Philadelphia Fight	July 14	Ken Strong Stadium
Oneida FC	12 – 100	Rhode Island Rebellion	July 14	Classical High School

=== Round 7 ===
Home	Score	Away	Match Information
Home	Score	Away	Date and Time (Local)	Venue
Jacksonville Axemen	54 – 22	Rhode Island Rebellion	July 21	Hodges Stadium
Baltimore Blues	0 – 100	Boston Thirteens	July 21	TBA
Philadelphia Fight	82 – 0	Oneida FC	July 21	Dixon Field, Cabrini College
Washington D.C. Slayers	30 – 0 (forfeit)	New Haven Warriors	July 21	Duke Ellington Field

=== Round 8 ===
Home	Score	Away	Match Information
Home	Score	Away	Date and Time (Local)	Venue
Boston Thirteens	44 – 10	Philadelphia Fight	July 28 @ 1pm	MIT Steinbrenner Stadium
Oneida FC	12 – 74	Washington D.C. Slayers	July 28 @ 3pm	MIT Steinbrenner Stadium
New Haven Warriors	0 – 30	Jacksonville Axemen	July 28	Ken Strong Stadium
Rhode Island Rebellion	68 – 16	Baltimore Blues	July 28	Classical High School

== Playoffs ==
The playoffs consisted of a two-round single-elimination tournament in August. The season's top four teams competed in a semi-final round, with the two winners going on to the Championship Final. In the first round on August 11, the first-placed team hosted the fourth-placed, and the second-placed hosted the third-placed.

Home	Score	Away	Match Information
Home	Score	Away	Date and Time (Local)	Venue	Referee	Crowd
SEMI-FINALS
Jacksonville Axemen	58 – 0	Washington DC Slayers	August 11, 2012	Hodges Stadium, Jacksonville
Philadelphia Fight	18 – 58	Boston 13s	August 11, 2012	Dixon Field, Cabrini College
CHAMPIONSHIP FINAL
Jacksonville Axemen	28 – 22	Boston 13s	August 25, 2012	Boston, Massachusetts
