= Rhode Island Rebellion =

US rugby league club, based in Providence, Rhode Island

Club information
- Full name: Rhode Island Rebellion; Rugby League Football Club
- Nickname: Rebellion
- Founded: 2011; 15 years ago

Current details
- Ground: Marvel Field, Brown University Providence, Rhode Island
- CEO: Lawrence Almagno
- Competition: USA Rugby League

The Rhode Island Rebellion were an American semi-professional rugby league football team based in Providence, Rhode Island. The Rebellion compete in the USA Rugby League (USARL), which they joined as a charter franchise in the 2011 season.

== History ==
The club was established in 2011 by Lawrence Almagno, Alex DeCiccio, and Anthony Nardolillo, as a charter member of the USA Rugby League. Together with Oneida FC and the New Jersey Turnpike Titans, they were one of three new teams to join the USARL, which was formed by clubs that had broken with the established American National Rugby League (AMNRL). The USARL had originally intended to establish a team in New York City, sponsored by Kodiak Capital Group, and named Kodiak Rugby. Almagno, a Kodiak employee, was one of the planners charged with setting up the team, but the group was unable to find a suitable venue in New York. Thereafter Almagano just having moved back to Rhode Island contacted DeCiccio in order to determine if Rhode Island had a large enough player pool to form a new team. After the first team meeting, Nardolillio joined Almagno and DeCiccio to assist in the task of bringing the team to Providence, Rhode Island. The move gave the USARL four teams in New England.

Almagno, who had experience playing both rugby league and rugby union, got together with former teammates DeCiccio and Nardolillo to recruit players. After initial difficulty finding players, they were able to recruit a full roster in time for the inaugural 2011 USARL season. They achieved their first win of the season in game four against the New Jersey Turnpike Titans. During their inaugural season the Rebellion attracted around 300 fans a game and was able to cover its expenses.

In 2014, with the growth of the USARL, the club was moved into the North East Division.

=== Youth development ===
The club run the American Youth Rugby League Association’s Providence High School Rugby League Competition in Rhode Island that involves 1,000 middle school students.

Alongside the Boston 13s, a four team U23 competition is also run in the Massachusetts and Rhode Island regions.

== International representatives ==
In 2015 Shain Singleton represented the United States national rugby league team USA Hawks in a match against Canada rugby league during game 2 of the Colonial Cup where 2 tries were scored directly off of his attacking kicks. In 2015 Jonathan St. John represented the United States Pioneers in a match against the Leeds Rhinos.

== Season summaries ==
C=Champions, R=Runners-Ups, F=Finished first, P=Playoff Appearance, L=Finished Last (Brackets Represent Playoff Games)
Competition	Games Played	Games Won	Games Drawn	Games Lost	Ladder Position	C	R	F	P	L	Division	Notes
2011 USARL season	8 (0)	3 (0)	0	5 (0)	5/8						N/A	club foundation season
2012 USARL season	8 (0)	4 (0)	0	4 (0)	5/8						N/A	
2013 USARL season	8 (0)	5 (0)	0	3 (0)	3/8						N/A	
2014 USARL season	8 (1)	4	2	3 (1)	1/3			X	X		North East	
2015 USARL season	10 (2)	6 (1)	0	4 (1)	2/5				X		North East	
2016 USARL season											North East	

== See also ==
- Rugby league in the United States
- List of defunct rugby league clubs in the United States
