= Robin Peers =

English RL coach and former professional rugby league footballer

Personal information
- Born: 18 January 1982 (age 44) North Tyneside, England
- Height: 5 ft 8 in (1.72 m)
- Weight: 84 kg (185 lb)

Playing information
- Position: Wing
Club
Years	Team	Pld	T	G	FG	P
1999–2012	Gateshead Thunder	218

Coaching information
Club
Years	Team	Gms	W	D	L	W%
2012–	Boston Thirteens	0	0	0	0
Representative
Years	Team	Gms	W	D	L	W%
2016	United States	0	0	0	0
- Source: As of 26 February 2021

Robin Peers (born 18 January 1982) is an English former professional rugby league footballer who went on to be head coach of the Boston Thirteens in the USARL, and interim Head Coach of the USA Hawks National Team. He played 13 years for his only club Gateshead Thunder. He made his first grade début in 2002 as a winger, and played there for most of his career, however his final season in 2012 was spent playing full back. Peers was a prominent part of the Gateshead Thunder team that were championship winners in 2008.

== Childhood ==
Robin grew up in Wallsend (North Tyneside) where he attended Richardson Dees First School, Western Middle School and Burnside Community High School. He played his junior rugby league for Newcastle Eagles (now Wallsend Eagles), signing for the club in 1992. Before taking up rugby league, Peers played football at junior level for the world famous Wallsend Boys Club.

During his childhood, he made numerous representative squads in Football, Rugby League, Rugby Union and Athletics.

== Playing career ==
Robin made 218 appearances in his 13 seasons with Gateshead Thunder which is currently a club record. He signed for the club in 1999 while still in high school and made his final appearance on 1 April 2012, scoring a 90m try in a 30-18 defeat versus Whitehaven. 3 days prior to this, Peers played in his testimonial game versus a North East Select XIII. He was awarded this in 2011 by the Rugby Football League for his services to his club and to the sport.

In 2009, Peers was part of the Gateshead Thunder side that finished 7th in the Co-operative Championship and runners-up in the Northern Rail 9s plate. He was also a part of their Challenge Cup run to the quarter-finals where they were eventually knocked out by cup holders St Helens.

In 2008 he won a league championship as part of the Gateshead team that season. He made 15 appearances on the wing and scored 9 tries. He was on the field as the club clinched the league title on 17 August 2008 with a 22-14 win away at Workington Town.

Robin made his début for Gateshead in 2002 versus Oldham Roughyeds.

In 1999, he was part of the Gateshead Thunder Academy side that won the Academy Division 2 Championship.

In 2012, Peers was a nominee for the Northern Star Award at the Co-operative Championships Awards Dinner.

== Playing Career - International ==
Prior to making his first appearance for Gateshead, Robin was part of the successful England Universities team that won the European Rugby Cup in 2001. The competition was held in Kazan (Russia) and the squad won all 4 games to take home the cup. Robin, scoring his first international try in the final.

After returning from Kazan, Peers was selected to represent Great Britain students versus BARLA Great Britain u23s in the Scottish Courage Cup Final a game that the students won. The game was played at Castleford Tigers RLFC.

He made one further appearance for England in December 2001 against the touring Queensland Universities side. The game was played at Blackheath RFC in London.

== Coaching career ==
Alongside his playing career, Peers trained and practiced as a rugby league coach. He started coaching at Newcastle Eagles (now Wallsend Eagles) in 2003, forming and coaching many of their teams (juniors & adults). He was employed as a full-time Community Rugby League Coach for County Durham in May 2005 and worked in this role until October 2009. He then worked full-time for the Rugby Football League as a Talent Coach from November 2009 to March 2012.

In 2010 and 2011, Peers worked on coach development projects for the Rugby League European Federation. In May 2010 he was part of the management team of a delegation that visited Rostov-on-Don, Russia to help promote and develop the sport of Rugby League. In March 2011, he worked on the RLEF Technical Coaching Strategy Course at Brunel University in London, a course that saw more than 50 delegates attend from 19 different nations.

In 2012, he was recruited to coach the Boston 13s franchise in the USA Rugby League and led them to their first USA Rugby League national championship in 2015.

In January 2016, Peers took on interim head-coaching duties with the United States in their exhibition match against the Leeds Rhinos, coached by current USA coach, Brian McDermott. He followed this up by taking the interim USA coaching duties again in July 2016, leading the United States to a big 54-4 win over Jamaica in the Rugby League Americas Championship Series

Sporting positions
Preceded by	Coach Boston Thirteens; 2012-2019	Succeeded by Peter Lupton; 2021-present
