= Clifford Charles Butler =

English physicist (1922–1999)

Sir Clifford Charles Butler FRS
- Sir Clifford Charles Butler © National Portrait Gallery, London
- Born: 20 May 1922; Reading, Berkshire, England
- Died: 30 June 1999 (aged 77); Glenfield Hospital, England
- Education: University of Reading
- Spouse: Kathleen Betty Collins
- Children: Hilary and Ruth
- Scientific career
- Fields: Particle physics
- Workplaces: University of Manchester; Imperial College London
- Doctoral advisors: Dr Tom Rymer

Sir Clifford Charles Butler FRS (20 May 1922 – 30 June 1999) was an English physicist, best known for the discovery of the hyperon and meson types of particles. In later life, Butler was involved in educational policy, serving as director of the Nuffield Foundation and vice-chancellor of Loughborough University.

== Life ==
Butler was born in Reading on 20 May 1922, the son of Charles Hannington James Butler, a clerk and buyer to a local wholesale grocer, and his wife Olive Pembroke. He attended both Reading School and the University of Reading, becoming both a Bachelor of Science and a Doctor of Philosophy there. He was appointed assistant lecturer in physics at the University of Manchester in 1945, and lecturer in 1947. In the same year he married Kathleen Betty Collins. They had two daughters. He died in Glenfield Hospital, near Leicester on 30 June 1999.

== Work ==
At Manchester, Butler worked with G. D. Rochester, studying cosmic rays using a cloud chamber. During this research, they found two unexpected events, one in October 1946 and one in May 1947, showing previously unknown particles. These V particles, later determined to be K+ and K0 (kaons), were a thousand times heavier than the electron and long-lived on nuclear timescales.

In order to increase the rate of detection with a higher flux of cosmic rays, the equipment was moved to the Pic du Midi de Bigorre observatory in the Pyrenees. The existence of the particles was confirmed by a group from the California Institute of Technology led by Carl Anderson, and the Butler group continued to study them and found that there were two types, hyperons and mesons. Butler's and Rochester's discovery may be seen as the first step towards understanding of the quark structure of matter.

In 1953, Butler left Manchester to lead a high-energy nuclear physics group at Imperial College in London. He was promoted to professor in 1957, and head of the physics department in 1963. While at Imperial College London, Butler chaired the consortium established to design the British National Hydrogen Bubble Chamber, which was operated at the Rutherford Appleton Laboratory and CERN. From 1964, he chaired the CERN Track Chamber Committee. He was elected a fellow of the Royal Society in 1961, and served as dean of the Royal College of Science between 1966 and 1969. Over this period he became increasingly interested in educational policy, joining the academic planning board of the University of Kent in 1963, the Schools Council in 1965, and the University Grants Committee in 1966. He eventually served on the Schools Council for 19 years.

In 1970, Butler resigned from Imperial College and his active involvement in physical research ceased. He accepted the role of director of the Nuffield Foundation, a charitable foundation influential in education. During his time there he set up a group for research and innovation in higher education, a programme for law and society, and the centre for agricultural strategy at the University of Reading. His role in the establishment of the Open University was also important, since the Nuffield Foundation funded a course on genetics as a test bed for other courses. He was appointed to the council of the Open University in 1971 and stayed as a member until 1995, serving as vice-chairman from 1986 to 1995. In 1975, Butler was appointed vice-chancellor of Loughborough University, retaining that post until he retired in 1985.

== Honours ==
Butler was knighted in 1983 for his services to education.

Academic offices
Preceded by Elfyn Richards	Vice-Chancellor of Loughborough University; 1975–1985	Succeeded by Professor John G. Phillips
