= Central Florida Warriors =

US semi-professional rugby league club, based in DeLand, Florida

Club information
- Full name: Central Florida Warriors; Rugby League Club
- Nickname: Warriors
- Colours: Red; Grey; Black
- Founded: 2014; 11 years ago

Current details
- Ground: Spec Martin Stadium DeLand, Florida (6,000)
- Coach: (United States) Taylor Alley (Australia) Shaun McSweeney
- Captain: (United States) Bart Longchamp
- Competition: USA Rugby League

The Central Florida Warriors were a semi-professional rugby league team based in DeLand, Florida United States. They competed in the USA Rugby League (USARL) in the Southeast Rugby League Conference. They play their home games at Spec Martin Stadium.

== History ==
The Warriors were founded in March, 2014 as part of an expansion by the USARL to represent the Central Florida area from Daytona to Orlando in the sport of rugby league. Along with fellow new clubs the Atlanta Rhinos and Tampa Mayhem they joined The Jacksonville Axemen to form the USARL South Conference.

The Warriors name was used as a way to pay tribute to all the military men and women who have served the United States.

After winning their inaugural game against fellow newcomers the Atlanta Rhinos in the opening round in the 2014 season, the team went on to finish second in the Southern Conference. In the playoffs they again defeated the Rhinos before being eliminated by the Jacksonville Axemen in the Southern Conference championship. 2015 saw the Warriors enter the season with newfound confidence after what many thought was a successful first season in the USARL. The team finished the regular season 3-3, again finishing second in their conference. This time in the playoffs they defeated the Axemen in the Conference semi-final before going down to the Atlanta Rhinos in the Conference championship round.

== USARL season summaries ==
C = champions, R = runners-up, F = finished first, P = playoff appearance, L = finished last (brackets represent playoff games)
Competition	Games Played	Games won	Games drawn	Games lost	Ladder position	C	R	F	P	L	Notes
2014 USARL season	8 (2)	4 (1)	0	4 (1)	4/11				x		Inaugural season
2015 USARL season	8 (2)	4 (1)	0	4 (1)	4/14				x		
2016 USARL season	7 (1)	0 (0)	1	6 (1)	11/14				x		
2017 USARL season	7 (1)	1 (0)	0	6 (1)	10/14				x		

== Jerseys and sponsors ==
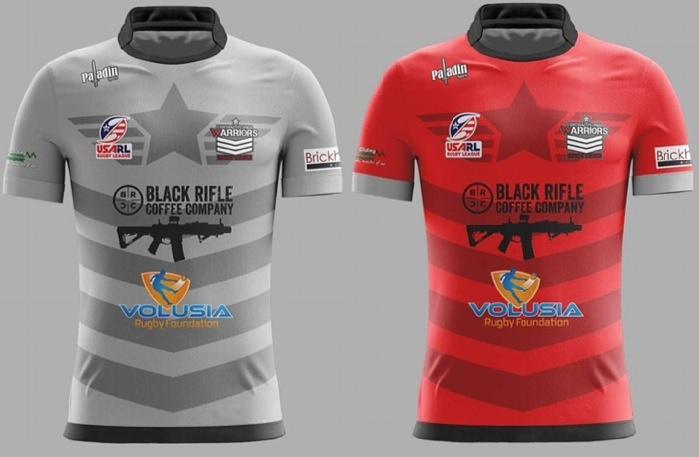
Grey Jersey is the Warriors Alternate Jersey, while the Red is the Primary

The Central Florida Warriors' 2017 Primary jersey is predominantly red, with the team's alternate jersey being the Grey. The main sponsors for the team are the Volusia Rugby Foundation along with the Black Rifle Coffee Company. Other sponsors include The Folding Sliding Door Company, the Brickhouse, Sampson Collaborative Law and Central 28 Brewary.

== Stadium ==
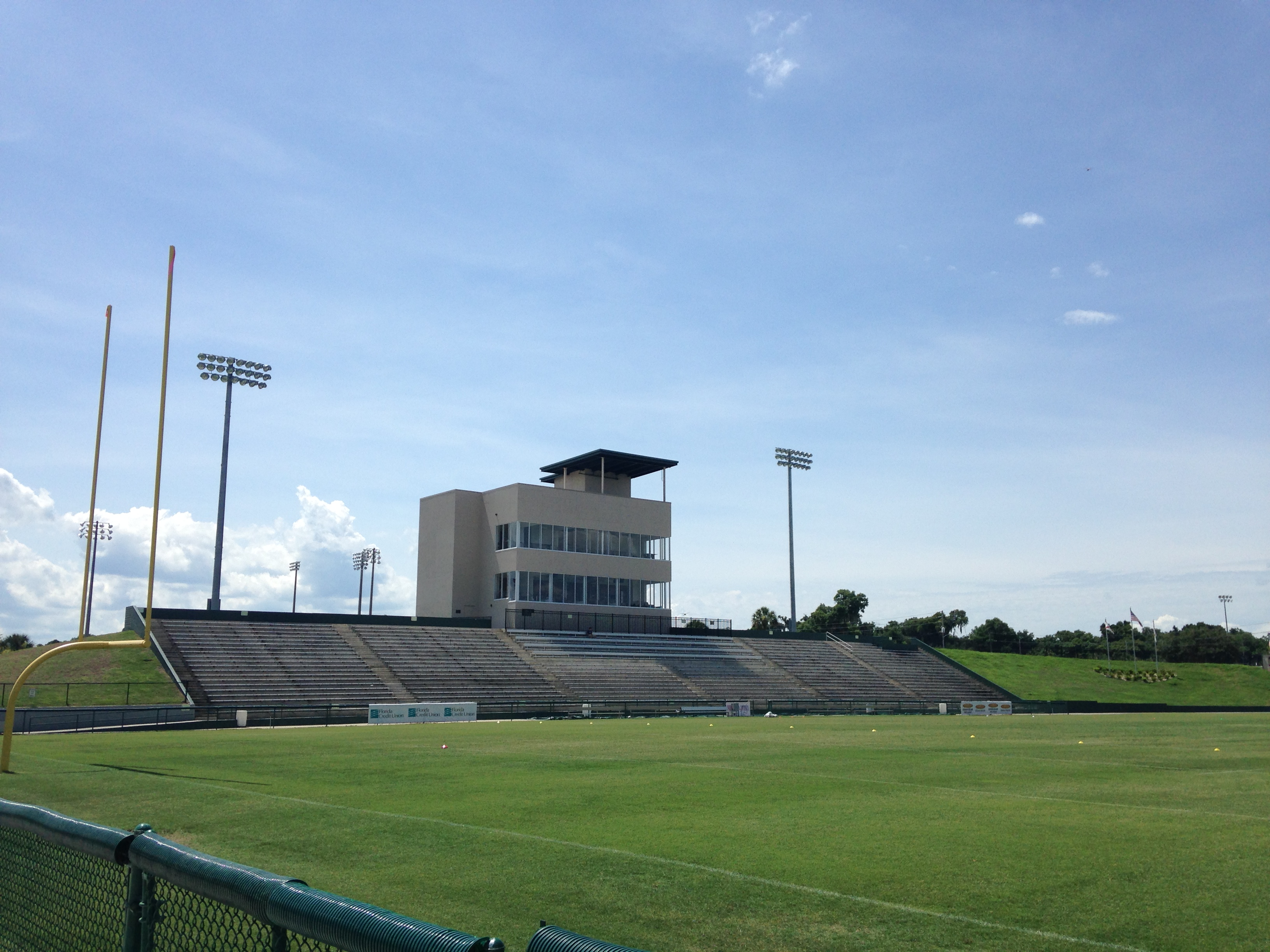
Spec Martin stadium main grandstand

The warriors play their home games at Spec Martin Stadium in DeLand, Fl approx. 25 miles south of Daytona Beach. The stadium underwent significant renovations recently, including a new press box, handicapped and premium seating areas, and new locker room facilities, establishing the venue as one of the premier stadiums in the USARL competition.

== Honors ==
- 2014 - USARL Conference Finalists
- 2015 - USARL Conference Finalists

== See also ==
- Rugby league in the United States
- List of defunct rugby league clubs in the United States
