= Boston Bears (rugby league) =

Rugby League Football Club in Boston, MA

Club information
- Full name: Boston 13s Rugby League Football Club, Inc.
- Nickname(s): 13s, Thirteens, B-13s, B-One-Three, Bears
- Colours: Red & Black British Racing Green Metallic Gold
- Founded: Friday, February 13, 2009; 17 years ago

Current details
- Ground: Briggs Field
- Coach: TBD
- Competition: USA Rugby League

Records
- Premierships: 1 (USARL) (2015)
- Runners-up: 1 (USARL) (2012)

The Boston Bears (formerly known as Boston 13s RLFC) are a rugby league football team based in Boston, Massachusetts, U.S. The team plays in the USA Rugby League, and were founding members of the former North American Rugby League.

The Boston Thirteens were founded in 2009 as an expansion team of the American National Rugby League (AMNRL). The league had been attempting to form a rugby league team in Boston for several years, due to the comparatively strong presence of rugby union in the area. The Thirteens played in the AMNRL from 2009 & 2010, going to the league semi-finals in their inaugural season. In 2010 they became one of seven teams to depart from the AMNRL in order to found a new governing body: the USA Rugby League (USARL), before moving onto the North American Rugby League in 2021.

== History ==
=== 1998–2008: Foundations ===
The American National Rugby League had been attempting to establish a team in the Boston area for years, hoping to gain a foothold for rugby league in an area with a comparatively strong rugby union presence. The Boston Storm competed in the first season of American domestic competition in 1998, but folded after a single season.

In 2005 overtures by the AMNRL and rugby league supporters drew the interest of some local rugby union players, and a local union club, the Boston Irish Wolfhounds, fielded a rugby league side that joined the AMNRL on a trial basis. The Wolfhounds played an abbreviated two-game exhibition schedule to build interest in the sport in Boston, with the intention of playing a full schedule for the 2006 season. The next year the team ended its association with the Wolfhounds, adopting the name Boston Braves. They played through the 2006 season, winning only one game; they suspended operations at the end of the year.

=== 2009–2011: Thirteens and entry to AMNRL ===
In 2009 a new leadership group led by Mikhael Nizam Shammas established a new team, which was named the Boston Thirteens. The club was incorporated as a C corporation (under the name of the "Boston 13s RLFC, Inc.") on Friday, February 13, 2009, and began play in the 2009 AMNRL season. They went to the playoffs that year, advancing to the semifinals before being defeated by the Jacksonville Axemen. They failed to qualify for the playoffs in the 2010 season.

=== 2011–2020: USARL ===
On January 12, 2011, the Thirteens became one of seven teams to depart from the AMNRL to found the new USA Rugby League. The new league began in 2011.

The Thirteens finished their first season in 6th place, not qualifying for the playoffs. They only achieved two victories, both over their Boston rivals Oneida FC. Boston made the Grand Finals in 2012 before falling in a close contest to the Jacksonville Axemen. In 2015, Boston won their first national championship defeating the South Conference champion Atlanta Rhinos 44–12.

=== 2021–2023: North American Rugby League ===
In March 2021 the Thirteens resigned from the USARL to become one of the founding teams of the new professional North American Rugby League.

=== 2024–present: North Sydney partnership and Boston Bears rebrand ===
In 2024, the Boston Thirteens and North Sydney Bears formed a partnership with plans to enter a team in USARL under the Boston Bears name and to provide player exchange and study opportunities.

== USARL season summaries ==
C=Champions, R=Runners-ups, F=Finished first, P=Playoff Appearance, L=Finished Last (Brackets Represent Playoff Games)
Competition	Games Played	Games Won	Games Drawn	Games Lost	Ladder Position	C	R	F	P	L	Coach	Captain	Notes
2011 USARL season	8 (0)	2	0	6	6/8						Mikhael N. Shammas	Clark Hoopes	
2012 USARL season	8 (2)	6 (1)	0	2 (1)	3/8		R		P		Mikhael N. Shammas	Dustin Cooper	
2013 USARL season	8 (0)	3	0	5	5/6				P		Dustin Cooper	Dustin Cooper	
2014 USARL season	7 (2)	3 (1)	1	3 (1)	5/11				P		Robin Peers	Marcos Flegmann	
2015 USARL season	10 (3)	9 (3)	0	1	1/14	C		F	P		Robin Peers	Marcos Flegmann	
2016 USARL season	11 (3)	7 (2)	0	3 (1)	3/14				P		Robin Peers		
2017 USARL season	8 (0)	3	0	5	6/14						Robin Peers		
2018 USARL season	8 (2)	3 (1)	0	5 (1)	6/10				P		Robin Peers		
2019 USARL season	8 (2)	6 (1)	0	2 (1)					P		James Smart		

== Logo and colors ==
The team was named the 13s reflecting the 13 original colonies of America, the thirteen players on the field in rugby league, plus the fact that the club is the thirteenth RLFC to be founded in the United States. For their inaugural season they adopted the colors of black and gold, and white and gold, with a logo incorporating the number 13 and a stylized Metatron's cube in the shape of a rugby football.

In 2010, and in conjunction with the re-branding of the American National Rugby League logo and those of all affiliated clubs, the Thirteens adopted a new logo which depicted the numeric symbols of "1" and "3" merged to form the letter "B" for Boston. Additionally, the color of British racing green was added to the existing colors of white and gold, reflecting the Boston area's strong Irish heritage.

== Current squad ==
Squad for the 2026 USARL season.

- 1.Michael Apitz (Fullback
- 2.Connor Connolly (Wing)
- 3.Ethan Timm (Centre)
- 4.Carlos Aquino (Centre)
- 5.Valentino Palmieri (Wing)
- 6.Teddy Curtis (Five-eighth)
- 7.Connor O'Neill (Halfback)
- 8.Matt Meads (Prop)
- 9.N/A (Hooker)
- 10.Jerry Manning (Prop)
- 11.Ray Lane (Second-row)
- 12.Ray Humphrey (Second-row)
- 13.Stephen Mineo (Lock)

== Honors ==
- AMNRL Championship titles: 0
- USARL:

Winners (1): 2015,
Runners up (1): 2012,

== International representation ==
=== USA Hawks ===
- (United States) Shane Begin (2014)
- (United States) Mike Elias (2017)
- (United States) Marcos Flegmann (2015-2016)
- (United States) Lance Gaines (2009)
- (United States) Curtis Goddard (2015)
- (United States) Tyler Ierardi (2016)
- (United States) Urban Iyo (2016)
- (United States) Matt Shipway (2013, 2017)
- (United States) Peter Lupton (2022)

Coaching Staff

- (England) Robin Peers (2016)

=== Other Nations ===
- (Wales) Peter Lupton (WAL)
- (Lebanon) George Aroyan (LEB)
- (France) Kane Bentley (FRA)
- (Lebanon) Mike Elias (LEB)
- (Mexico) Marcos Flegmann (MEX)
- (Lebanon) Mikhael Shammas (LEB)
- (Italy) Ronny Palumbo (ITA)
- (Indonesia) Kyle Winter (IDN)

== See also ==
- Rugby league in the United States
- List of sports clubs inspired by others
