= Garthwaite Stadium =

Multi-sports venue in Conshohocken, Pennsylvania

A. A. Garthwaite Stadium
- Interactive map of A. A. Garthwaite Stadium
- Full name: Albert A. Garthwaite Stadium Field
- Location: 106 East 11th Avenue, Conshohocken, Pennsylvania
- Coordinates: 40°04′38″N 75°18′7″W
- Capacity: 3,700
- Surface: Grass

Construction
- Renovated: 2012

Tenants
- Philadelphia Fight (rugby league); Providence Warriors (American football); Pennsylvania Phoenix (rugby union); American Ultimate Disc League; United States national rugby league team (2013–2016)

Garthwaite Stadium is a multi-sports venue in Conshohocken, Pennsylvania, in the USA. It has a capacity of 3,700 with its full name being the Albert A. Garthwaite Stadium Field. The stadium is named for the former President of Lee Tire & Rubber Company.

In 2012 the stadium was fully renovated with upgrades to the stands, facilities and the floodlights. The stadium hosts the Conshohocken Music Festival and was used by Toronto Wolfpack rugby league team for their reality programme Last Tackle.

== Philadelphia Phoenix ==
The Philadelphia Phoenix, a professional ultimate team and member of the American Ultimate Disc League (AUDL), played their home games at Garthwaite Stadium from 2013 to 2019.

== Rugby League ==
USA Rugby League club Philadelphia Fight play their home games at the stadium and the USA national rugby league team have also used the ground since 2013.

== USA Rugby League International Matches ==
USA points tally listed first.

Date	Opponent	Score	Attendance	Competition
24 August 2013	Canada	44–16	175	Colonial Cup
23 September 2013	Canada	36–14		
19 July 2014	Samoa	18–12		
19 September 2015	Canada	28–36		Colonial Cup
18 October 2015	Canada	28–34		Colonial Cup
23 July 2016	Jamaica	54–4		Americas Championship

== USA Grand Finals ==
Season	Winners	Score	Runners-up	Attendance
AMNRL 2010	Jacksonville Axemen	34–14	New Haven Warriors	1,300
USARL 2011	Philadelphia Fight	28–26	New Haven Warriors	
USARL 2013	Philadelphia Fight	28–22	Jacksonville Axemen	

== See also ==
- List of rugby league stadiums by capacity
