= All Saints' Academy (Florida) =

American private school

All Saints Academy
- ASA symbol

Location
- 5001 State Road 540 West; State Road 540 West; Winter Haven, Polk County, Florida 33880; United States; 28°0′36″N 81°47′52″W

Information
- School type: Private Preparatory School
- Motto: Inspiring independent thinkers, principled leaders, and humble learners.
- Established: 1966
- Status: Open
- School code: 101892
- Head of school: Nick Hinrichsen
- Faculty: 100
- Grades: Pre-K3–12
- Enrollment: 600
- Average class size: 15
- Language: English
- Hours in school day: 6 Hours, 45 Minutes
- Colors: Red, White, and Blue
- Sports: Lacrosse, football, basketball, soccer, swimming, golf, baseball, softball, volleyball, track and field, cross country, tennis, cheer
- Mascot: Saint Bernard
- Nickname: The Saints
- Rival: Lakeland Christian School
- Website: allsaintsacademy.com

'All Saints Academy is an independent preparatory school located in Winter Haven, Florida that is affiliated with the Episcopal Church. Grades serviced within the school range from Pre-School, at age 2, through the twelfth grade. The school is located on a 60-acre campus located between Winter Haven and Lakeland on State Road 540.

== History ==
All Saints Academy was founded in 1966 as St. Paul's Episcopal Parish School under Father Gilbertson and Father Sturrup of Saint Paul's Episcopal Church. The school did not adopt its current name until 1993, when the middle and upper school portions of the facility were added. In 1997 Dr. Maryly Van Leer Peck lead the school and during her tenure, it extended the grades serviced to grade twelve, had their first graduating class finished their education in 1997 with a 100% graduation rate.

== Academic ratings ==
The school prides itself on its ongoing 100% college acceptance rate, supported by two full-time college advisors.
