= Jacksonville Axemen =

Rugby League Football Club in Jacksonville, FL

Club information
- Full name: Jacksonville Axemen; Rugby League
- Nickname: Axemen / Jax Axe / Jax Axemen
- Colours: Red; White; Blue
- Founded: 2006; 20 years ago
- Website: Team Website

Current details
- Ground: Rock Stadium Jacksonville, Florida (5,000)
- CEO: (United States) Drew Slover
- Coach: (Australia) Sean Rutgerson
- Captain: (United States) Malcolm Webb
- Competition: USA Rugby League
- 2026 USARL season: East Coast Conference (Southeast Divison) 2nd

Records
- Premierships: 4 (1 AMNRL, 3 USARL) (2010, 2012, 2018, 2022)
- Runners-up: 6 (1 2009), 5 (2013, 2014, 2016, 2023, 2025) (2009, 2013)
- Minor premierships: 7 (1 AMNRL, 6 USARL) (2009, 2011, 2012, 2014, 2016, 2018 2019)

The Jacksonville Axemen are a rugby league team based in Jacksonville, Florida, U.S. They currently play in the USA Rugby League (USARL). They play their home games at D. B. Milne Field also known as Rock Stadium on the campus of Jacksonville University. The club former ground was the North Practice Soccer Fields at the University of North Florida.

Together with the New Haven Warriors, the Axemen were founded in 2006 as an expansion team of the American National Rugby League (AMNRL). Since their inception they have become one of the most successful rugby football clubs in the United States both on and off the field. They advanced to the AMNRL playoffs in 2006, 2008, and 2009, and won the 2010 AMNRL Championship. The side currently holds the record for the largest margin of victory (96–8 as of 2016) in the league's history. In 2011 they became one of seven team to depart the AMNRL to form the new USARL, which kicked off in June of that year. Under the USARL, the Axemen have won three National Championships (2012, 2018 & 2022) and made three appearances ( 2013, 2014, 2016).

== History ==
They are one of the most successful teams in America both in on-field and off-field operations, making it to the finals in four of their five years of play. They are the first Rugby League team in the US to stream all their home games live on the internet in an effort expose the sport in the US to the rest of the world via the World Wide Web. They often appear on local television and radio shows and are supported by the local media community in Jacksonville.

The club was founded for the 2006 American National Rugby League season by Drew Slover and Australian Daryl Howland in the state of Florida (where both individuals resided) had no representation in the top level rugby league competition in the USA. After becoming the first AMNRL club to come from the southern state the Axemen had an impressive debut season finishing in the top six and qualifying for the playoffs; however they would eventually be knocked out by the New Jersey Sharks. In their first 5 years of operations, the Axemen made AMNRL playoffs, 4 times, with two trips to the title game and one national championship title.

The Jacksonville Axemen hosted the teams of the Australia Day Challenge on January 26, 2008 at the University of North Florida, Hodges Stadium. This event drew 12,500 fans from 40 states in the US and 15 countries. They also hosted the "Rhinos Stampede to Florida" that saw the Leeds Rhinos and the Salford City Reds (both from the UK) visit Jacksonville for a 10-day training camp and game during early 2009 that saw 7000 fans visit Hodges Stadium. Later that year they Axemen also arranged and hosted the "HotelsofJacksonville.com Atlantic Cup" that saw the USA National Team play the Jamaica National team in a full international. A crowd of approximately 3500 attended the game.

The Axemen are believed to be the most recognizable Rugby League team in the USA. They hold the current record for most fans and supporters at home games with average crowds of 2500 and have merchandise sales that ship globally during the season.

In January 2011 the Axemen were one of seven AMNRL teams to announce they were departing to form the new USA Rugby League. They played their first game in the new league on June 4, 2011. The club managed to secure the inaugural minor premiership, however disappointingly were eliminated in the first week of the play-offs by the New Haven Warriors. They did, however, go on to win the National Championship in only their second year in the new league (2012)

On August 25, 2018, the Jacksonville Axemen defeated the Brooklyn Kings 58–16 to win the 2018 National Championship. In 2022 they also on another Championship (Grand Final) 36-12 against the Tampa Mayhem.

== Current squad ==
- 1.Jason Martin (Fullback)
- 2.Gerard Taylor (Wing)
- 3.Arrie Love (Centre)
- 4.Edson Jean-Baptiste (Centre)
- 5.Dan Morcom (Wing)
- 6.Malcolm Webb (Five-eighth)
- 7.Ryan Bannerot (Halfback)
- 8.Justin Williams (Prop)
- 9.Eric Khideri (Hooker)
- 10.Jack Carter (Prop)
- 11.Logan Holman (Second-row)
- 12.Lloyd Woodson (Second-row)
- 13.Volney Vo (Lock)
- 14.Corey Mims (Prop)
- 15.Todd Moe
- 16.Craig Howitt (Prop)
- 17.Tim Holcombe
- 18.Tommy Perry (Second-row)
- 19.Kyle McCollum (Five-eighth)
- 20.Patrick Setzer (Second-row)
- 21.Matt Visali (Wing)
- 22.David Harrold (Lock)
- 23.Brad Shipman (Second-row)

== USARL season summaries ==
C = Champions, R = Runners-Ups, F = Finished first, P = Playoff Appearance, L = Finished Last (Brackets Represent Playoff Games)
Jacksonville Axemen History
Competition	Games Played	Games Won	Games Drawn	Games Lost	Ladder Position	C	R	F	P	L	Coach	Notes
2011 USARL season	8 (1)	7 (0)	0	1 (1)	1/8			F	P		Daryl Howland	L, SF vs New Haven, 4–13
2012 USARL season	8 (2)	8 (2)	0	0 (0)	1/8	C		F	P		Mat Keeley	Undefeated Season
2013 USARL season	8 (2)	7 (1)	0	1 (1)	2/6		R		P		Brent Shorten	L, GF vs Philadelphia, 28–22
2014 USARL season	6 (3)	6 (2)	0	1 (1)	2/11		R		P		Mat Keeley	L, GF vs Philadelphia, 18–30
2015 USARL season	6 (3)	3 (1)	0	4 (1)	10/14				P		Wayne Forbes	L, South SF vs Central Florida, 14-44
2016 USARL season	6 (3)	6 (2)	0	1 (1)	3/14		R		P		Ben Nicoll	L, GF vs Philadelphia, 20–42
2017 USARL season	6 (3)	2	0	5 (1)	9/12				P		Sean Rutgerson	L, South SF vs Tampa, 22-42
2018 USARL season	6 (3)	3 (3)	0	3 (0)	1/11	C		F	P		Sean Rutgerson	Undefeated Season
2019 USARL season	8 (3)	8 (2)	0	1 (1)	2/11		R		P		Sean Rutgerson	L, GF vs Santa Rosa, 16–20
2020 USARL season	No season due to the COVID-19 pandemic										Sean Rutgerson	Season Canceled
2021 USARL season	7 (1)	6	0	1 (1)	1/6			F	P		Sean Rutgerson	L, South Final vs Tampa, 18-14
2022 USARL season	7 (1)	7 (1)	0	0	1/4	C		F	P		Sean Rutgerson	Undefeated Season
2023 USARL season	8 (2)	6 (1)	0	2 (1)	2/12		R		P		Sean Rutgerson	L, GF vs Santa Rosa, 16–20
2024 USARL season	7 (1)	5	0	2 (1)	7/18				P		Sean Rutgerson	L, FRL final vs Copperheads, 30-18
2025 USARL season	8 (2)	6 (1)	0	2 (1)	1/7		R	F	P		Sean Rutgerson	L, GF vs Brooklyn,18–34
2026 USARL season	6 (1)	4	0	2 (1)	5/13				P		Sean Rutgerson	L, South Final vs Tampa, 60-6

== Logo and colors ==
For their inaugural American National Rugby League season the club adopted the colors of white, red and blue but the uniforms are predominantly white.

== Title Sponsorship ==
The 2006 and 2007 seasons the club's major jersey sponsor is T Mobile with Jaxbars.com being the back jersey sponsor.

The 2008 and 2009 the Axemen were title sponsored by Barons Brewing from Australia. This partnership and the efforts the Axemen put into marketing their Black Wattle beer, made Jacksonville the biggest market for the beer in Florida

2010 season added the Paradise Island Rental Community as the Major jersey sponsor as well as Heekin Orthopedic Specialists (Now Southeast Orthopedic Specialist) as a minor jersey sponsor & official medical partner

2011, 2012, and 2013 the Axemen's Title/Major jersey sponsor was Firehouse Subs, with minor jersey sponsorships from Heekin Orthopedic Specialists.

2014 Title/Major Sponsor: Coastal Spine & Pain Center

2015 Title Sponsor: Dr Clayman's Miracle Spa

2016 Title Sponsor: St. Vincent Healthcare

2017 the Axemen secured a 3-year partnership with 121 Financial Credit Union as their Major/Title Sponsor.

2018 Title Sponsor: 121 Financial Credit Union

2019 Title Sponsor: 121 Financial Credit Union

2026 Title Sponsor:Permit Rockstar

== 10th Anniversary ==
In 2015, the Axemen celebrated their 10th season of operation. A special 10th anniversary logo was created to help celebrate 10 season of Rugby League in Jacksonville.

== Southeastern Rugby League Championship ==
In 2011 the Axemen launched a reserve grade competition, the Firehouse Subs Southeastern Rugby League Championship, which acts as a feeder club system for the Axemen to further develop players. It developed into teams known today like the Atlanta Rhinos.

== Stadium ==
For their debut season the Axemen used the Hodges Stadium in North Florida as their home field and they agreed to do the same for the 2007 season including reaching an agreement with the AMNRL to host the 2007 Grand Final Championship game there.

The Axemen currently play their home games at D.B. Milne Field.

== First ever American football vs Rugby League game ==
In August 2009 the Jacksonville Axemen played a cross code game between Rugby league and American football, by playing the Jacksonville Knights (of the Florida Football Alliance) and defeated them 38-27. It may have been the first time that both an American football team and a Rugby league team played a cross code game. Both teams received coaching in their opponent's sport and then played one half in full American football equipment and rules before both teams removed the pads and helmets to play Rugby league in the second half.

== International Events ==
Australia Day Challenge

Rugby league was widely exposed to Jacksonville residents during the Australia Day Challenge on January 26, 2008, an exhibition match hosted by actor Russell Crowe between the South Sydney Rabbitohs (Australia) and the Leeds Rhinos (United Kingdom) - the first international Rugby League match held in the United States.

The Jacksonville Axemen were co-hosts to the event and received a higher level of local recognition through participation in and the success of the event.

== Statistics and records ==
Biggest Winning Margin

Margin	Score	Opponent	Venue	Date
88	96 - 8	Philadelphia Fight	Hodges Stadium	July 29, 2006 (Rd 10)

Biggest Losing Margin

Margin	Score	Opponent	Venue	Date
60	60 - 0	Aston DSC Bulls	Aston, PA	June 21, 2008 (Rnd 3)

Most Points for the club

Player	Points	Years	M
Perry Vaught	70 (4 tries, 27 goals)	2006	10 *

Most Points in a Match

Points	Player	Opponent	Venue	Date	Score
20 (10 goals)	Perry Vaught	Philadelphia Fight	Hodges Stadium	Round 10, 2006	96 - 8

Biggest Attendance

Attendance	Venue	Opponent	Score	Date
2,300	Hodges Stadium	Philadelphia Fight	Won 30-10	July 20, 2010 (Round 6)

== Honors ==
=== National Champions ===
- AMNRL: 2010
- USARL: 2012, 2018, 2022

==== Minor Premiers ====
- AMNRL: 2009
- USARL: 2011, 2012, 2014, 2016, 2018, 2019

===== Southern Conference =====
Champions: 2014, 2016, 2018, 2019, 2023, 2025

== See also ==
- Rugby league in the United States
