= Lakeland Renegades =

US rugby league club, based in Lakeland, Florida

Club information
- Full name: Lakeland Renegades; Rugby League Football Club
- Nickname: Renegades
- Founded: 2019; 6 years ago

Current details
- Competition: USA Rugby League

The Lakeland Renegades are an American Rugby league football team based in Lakeland, Florida who play in the Southern Conference of the USA Rugby League. They were founded in 2019.

== See also ==
- Rugby league in the United States
