= Oneida FC =

US soccer club, based in East Boston, Massachusetts

Oneida
- Full name: Oneida Football Club
- Founded: 2011; 15 years ago
- Ground: East Boston Memorial Stadium
- League: Bay State Soccer League
colours	colours

Oneida FC (Oneida Football Club) is a soccer club based in East Boston. The organisation was established in 2011 and plays its home games at East Boston Memorial Stadium, owned by the city of Boston. The field also hosts American football and baseball games.

In the past, Oneida had a rugby league team which was dissolved in 2013. It played in the USA Rugby League (USARL) from 2011 to 2012 before pausing their operations. The team played their home games at Henry G. Steinbrenner '27 Stadium on the campus of the Massachusetts Institute of Technology.

In 2020 a separate organization, "Oneida County Football Club", was started in Utica, Oneida County, NY. They feature youth soccer teams. On June 4, 2022 the 2010 birth year team played their final tournament winning the prestigious Northstars Cup. There currently is a 2011–12 team.

== History ==
=== Rugby League ===
The Oneida FC rugby league club was established in 2011 as a charter member of the newly announced USA Rugby League, which was formed by teams that had left the established American National Rugby League (AMNRL). The team was named in honor of the Oneida Football Club, the first ever organized football team in the United States, which operated from 1862–1865. Together with the New Jersey Turnpike Titans and the Rhode Island Rebellion, they were one of three new teams to join the league.

The club operated under the leadership the USARL's other Boston-based team, the Boston Thirteens, but competed as a separate team. The establishment of Oneida FC put two USARL teams in Boston, and four in New England, an arrangement that lowered operating costs. The team struggled on the field in their inaugural season but found success in recruiting players from other sports.

Oneida finished the 2012 season in sixth place, missing the playoffs. They were initially announced to compete in 2013, but withdrew before the season, along with the New Haven Warriors.

Oneida FC played all home games at Henry G. Steinbrenner '27 Stadium at the Massachusetts Institute of Technology.

=== Soccer ===
The organization also fielded an amateur soccer team under the "Oneida FC" banner in the Casa Soccer League of Boston, where they won the championship in 2011. They moved to the Bay State Soccer League (BSSL) in 2013, where they currently compete in Division 2.

== USARL season summaries ==
C=Champions, R=Runners-up, F=Finished first, P=Playoff Appearance, L=Finished Last (Brackets Represent Playoff Games)
Competition	Games Played	Games Won	Games Drawn	Games Lost	Ladder Position	C	R	F	P	L	Coach	Captain	Notes
2011 USARL season	8 (0)	1 (0)	0	7 (0)	8/8					L	Mikhael Shammas; Benjamin P. McHugh	Clark Hoopes	Club foundation season
2012 USARL season	8 (0)	2 (0)	0	6 (0)	6/8						Mikhael Shammas; Benjamin P. McHugh	Clark Hoopes	

== See also ==
- List of defunct rugby league clubs in the United States
