= Spec Martin Stadium =

Stadium in DeLand, Florida

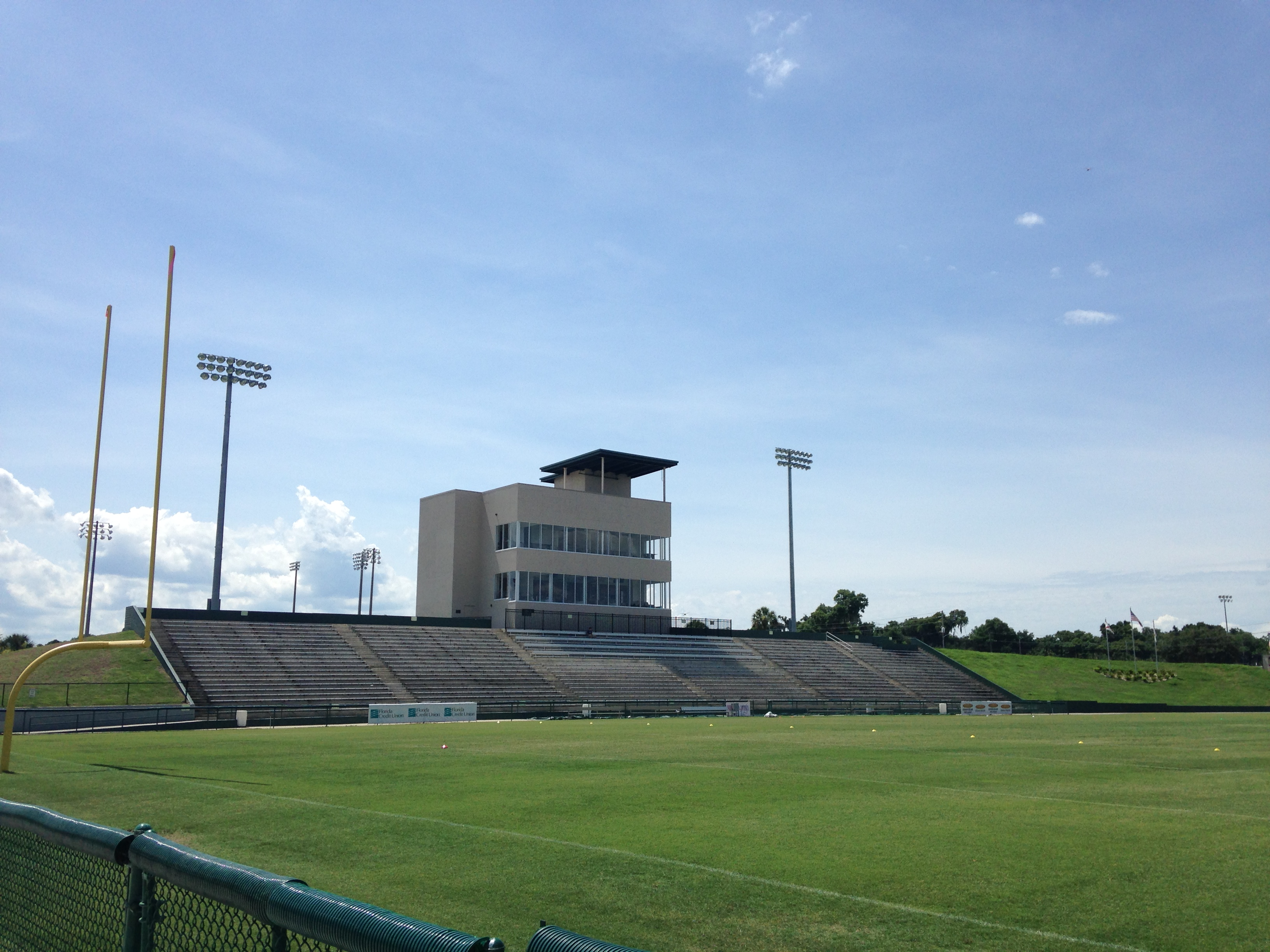
- Interactive map of Spec Martin Stadium
- Former names: DeLand Municipal Stadium (1941–1973)
- Location: 260 East Euclid Avenue, DeLand, Florida
- Coordinates: 29.020124°N 81.300010°W
- Owner: City of DeLand, Florida
- Operator: City of DeLand, Florida
- Capacity: 6,000

Construction
- Built: 1941

Tenants
- Stetson Hatters football (NCAA) (2014–Present); Central Florida Warriors (USA Rugby League) (2014–2017)

Spec Martin Stadium is a 6,000 seat football stadium located in DeLand, Florida. Spec Martin Stadium currently hosts Stetson Hatters football, DeLand High School Bulldog football and was the host of the Central Florida Warriors rugby league team. The stadium was known as DeLand Municipal Stadium from its opening in 1941 until it was renamed in 1973.

== History ==
The stadium had served as home of the Stetson University Hatters football team before the school discontinued its football program in 1956, and in 2013 it once again featured Hatters football when Stetson started play in the Pioneer Football League after a 57-year hiatus.

=== Renovations ===
As part of Stetson's re-entry into college football, Spec Martin Stadium underwent significant renovations, including a new press box, handicapped and premium seating areas, and new locker room facilities.

== Notable events ==
On February 2, 1985, the stadium hosted a USFL exhibition game pitting the newly-relocated Orlando Renegades against the defending (and eventual) champion Baltimore Stars. About 3,000 fans showed up to watch the Renegades win, 16-10.

Spec Martin was a filming location for the 1998 film The Waterboy starring Adam Sandler. In the film, the stadium depicted the home field of the fictional South Central Louisiana State Mud Dogs.

The stadium hosted a qualifying match between Canada and Jamaica for the 2017 Rugby League World Cup on December 8, 2015. The match ended in an 18–18 draw; neither team qualified for the World Cup, as they both lost qualifying matches to the USA.

== See also ==
- List of NCAA Division I FCS football stadiums
- List of rugby league stadiums by capacity
