= V particle =

Heavy, unstable subatomic particle

In particle physics, V was a generic name for heavy, unstable subatomic particles that decay into a pair of particles, thereby producing a characteristic letter V in a bubble chamber or other particle detector. Such particles were first detected in cosmic ray interactions in the atmosphere in the late 1940s and were first produced using the Cosmotron particle accelerator at Brookhaven National Laboratory in the 1950s. Since all such particles have now been identified and given specific names, for instance Kaons or Sigma baryons, this term has fallen into disuse.

V^{0} is still used on occasion to refer generally to neutral particles that may confuse the B-tagging algorithms in a modern particle detector, as is used in Section 7 of this ATLAS conference note.
