= Philadelphia Fight =

US semi-professional rugby league club, based in Conshohocken, Pennsylvania

Club information
- Full name: Philadelphia Fight; Rugby League Football Club
- Nickname(s): Philly, The Fight
- Colours: Green; Red
- Founded: 1998; 28 years ago

Current details
- Ground: Garthwaite Stadium Conshohocken, Pennsylvania (3,000)
- Competition: USA Rugby League

Uniforms
Away colours

Records
- Premierships: 4 (USARL) (2011, 2013, 2014, 2016)
- Runners-up: 2 (AMNRL) (1998, 2000)
- Minor premierships: 4 (USARL) (2013, 2014, 2016 (Undefeated Season))

The Philadelphia Fight are a semi professional rugby league team based in the Philadelphia metropolitan area. They currently compete in the USA Rugby League, having formerly competed in the now defunct AMNRL. They play their home games at A. A. Garthwaite Stadium in Conshohocken, Pennsylvania.

Originally known as the Philadelphia Bulldogs, the team began play in 1998 as a charter member of the American National Rugby League (AMNRL). In 2007 the Fight reorganized, merging with another AMNRL team in the Philadelphia area, the Delaware Valley Mantarays, in hopes of establishing a more competitive franchise for the future. During their run they made a total of six playoff appearances, advancing to the Grand Final in 1998 and 2000. In 2011 the Fight became one of seven teams to depart the AMRNL to form the USA Rugby League. They went on to win the league's inaugural Grand Final on August 27, 2011, also the 2013 and 2014 USARL Championship. The 2014 season, the Philadelphia Fight went undefeated winning all seven regular season and three playoff matches. Rhys Bowdich was named the 2014 National Championships MVP.

== History ==
The Fight were founded in 1998 by Jeff Preston, and were originally known as the Philadelphia Bulldogs. That year they became a charter franchise in Super League America, the predecessor to the modern American National Rugby League. One of several teams to have been based in the Philadelphia area, they participated in the first ever War at the Shore event, an early attempt to introduce rugby league to the United States. They experienced significant success in the league's early years, going to the playoffs in 1998, 1999, 2000, and 2002, and advancing to the Grand Final in 1998 and 2000. They further won the 2002 Mother's Day Sevens Championship. However, their on-field prominence declined through the 2000s as the AMNRL continued to expand. In 2007 the Fight and another team in suburban Philadelphia, the Delaware Valley Mantarays, announced they would be merging in order to build a more competitive franchise for the future. The merged franchise was restructured with a constitution and recognized Board of Directors and CEO, forming a Limited Liability Company. They made further playoff runs in the 2009 and 2010 seasons.

On January 12, 2011, the Philadelphia Fight were one of seven teams to leave the AMNRL to form the new USA Rugby League. On January 13, 2011, the league announced that Philadelphia Fight chairman Peter Illfield would be the league's first Chairman.

The Fight finished third over all in the 2011 regular season. After defeating the Washington D.C. Slayers in the semi-finals, they hosted the New Haven Warriors in the inaugural Grand Final. Philadelphia won the game 28-26, taking home their first ever national championship.

The Philadelphia Fight currently play their home games at A. A. Garthwaite Stadium in Conshohocken, Pennsylvania. The local Valley Tavern in the Valley Forge Casino resort serves as their official clubhouse. Thirteen players have represented the US in International matches playing for the Tomahawks, the United States national rugby league team. The Fight has a strong charity involvement with the ALS Association of the Greater Philadelphia Area, to help fight Lou Gehrig's disease.

== USARL season summaries ==
C=Champions, R=Runners-up, F=Finished first, P=Playoff Appearance, L=Finished Last (Brackets Represent Playoff Games)
Competition	Games Played	Games Won	Games Drawn	Games Lost	Ladder Position	C	R	F	P	L	Coach	Captain	Notes
2011 USARL season	8 (2)	6 (2)	0	2 (0)	3/8	C			P		Peter Illfield	Ryan Douglas	
2012 USARL season	8 (1)	6 (0)	0	2 (1)	2/8				P		Peter Illfield	Ryan Douglas	
2013 USARL season	8 (2)	7 (2)	0	1 (0)	1/8	C		F	P		Peter Illfield	Joel Weeks	
2014 USARL season	8 (2)	8 (2)	0	0 (0)	1/8	C		F	P		Rich Henson	Rhys Bowdich	
2015 USARL season	8 (2)	8 (1)	0	0 (1)	1/8			F	P		Rich Henson	Rhys Bowdich	
2016 USARL season	8 (3)	8 (3)	0	0 (0)	1/8	C		F	P		Rich Henson	Rhys Bowdich	
2017 USARL season	8 (0)	3 (0)	0	5 (0)	7/8						Rich Henson	Rich Henson	

== Logo and colors ==
Team badge used until 2010

For the 2009 season the club adopted a similar uniform to that of the Australian National Rugby League team the South Sydney Rabbitohs; that being the colors of Red and Green hoops. Until 2010 the club's badge used the Rabbitoh's colors as well as featuring a stylized Liberty Bell as the design on a ring worn by a clenched fist. Behind the fist trailed a representation of the Delaware River. In 2010, the club, along with other AMNRL teams, adopted a new badge that retained the fist of the earlier design.

== Stadium ==
The Philadelphia Fight currently play their home games at A. A. Garthwaite Stadium, 11th and Harry Streets, Conshohocken, Pennsylvania. The local Kildare's Irish Pub in Manayunk serves as their official clubhouse.

== Honors ==
- AMNRL Championship titles: 0

1998, 2000 Grand Finalists

- USARL:

Winners (4): 2011, 2013, 2014, 2016,

== International caps ==
- Jeff Preston United States
- Brian Warren United States
- Vea Ofa United States
- Conway Maraki New Zealand
- Mo Tuifua United States
- Ryan McGough United States
- Alan Chmielewski United States
- David Bowe New Zealand
- Keith Cassidy United States
- Chris Vely United States
- Jared Frymoyer United States
- Larry Madden United States
- Marlon Steele United States
- Stephen Siano United States
- Louis Tulio United States
- Patrick Kelly United States
- Fraser Stirling Scotland

== See also ==
- Sports in Philadelphia
- Rugby league in the United States
