= Washington D.C. Slayers =

US defunct rugby league club, based in Washington DC

Club information
- Full name: Washington D.C. Slayers; Rugby League Football Club
- Nickname: Slayers
- Colours: Primary: Red; White; Secondary: Blue
- Founded: 2003; 23 years ago
- Exited: 2016; 10 years ago

Former details
- Ground: Duke Ellington Field Washington, D.C. (3,000)
- CEO: (Republic of Ireland) Martin O'Donoghue
- Coach: (Australia) Justin Barlogio (United States) Danny Hanson
- Captain: (United States) Dave Parmiter
- Competition: USA Rugby League
- 2011: 2nd

The Washington D.C. Slayers were a rugby league football team based in Washington, D.C. who last played in the USA Rugby League. They played their home games at Duke Ellington Field near Georgetown Hospital.

The Slayers, along with the Connecticut Wildcats, were established in 2003 as expansion teams of the American National Rugby League (AMNRL). They played in the AMNRL for eight seasons, from 2003 to 2010, making it to the league playoffs six times and advancing to the semi-finals in their inaugural season. In 2011 they became one of seven teams to depart from the AMNRL to form the new USA Rugby League.

== History ==
The team was founded in 2003 by B.J. Chetham who sponsored the team's early foundation after learning that Rugby League was being played in Pennsylvania. Going to visit Pennsylvania to watch the New Zealand Kiwis play the US National Team the Tomahawks, B.J. through David Niu, President of the American National Rugby League, helped find keen players to organise a club in Washington, D.C. On making contact with Martin O'Donoghue, who had played on the United States National team American National Rugby League, the first club meeting was held with fellow New Zealanders, Americans, Australians, and British players living in the D.C and surrounding areas. Martin was involved in the early development of The Slayers, along with the Connecticut Wildcats of Norwalk, Connecticut, joined the league as expansion teams for the 2003 season. At this time most players were recruited from rugby union clubs from across the greater Washington area, and many of them were personal friends of O'Donoghue, who served as the team's first coach.

The Slayers went to the league playoffs in their inaugural year, advancing to the semi-finals before being defeated by the Connecticut Wildcats. They went to the playoffs again in 2004, but in the beginning of a trend that would follow the team through the 2000s, were knocked out in the first round by the team that would go on to win the Grand Final. After the season founder O'Donoghue left the United States. The team nearly collapsed, as only eight players committed to play for 2005, less than the thirteen needed on the field. Nevertheless, these eight completed every game of the season. The team was able to rebuild the following year, and advanced to the playoffs in 2006, 2007, 2008, and 2010, though never making it past the first round.

=== USARL ===
On January 12, 2011, the Slayers became one of seven teams to leave the AMNRL to form the new USA Rugby League. On February 18, it was announced that players and staff from the Fairfax Eagles, another Washington-based team that ceased operations before the season, would join the Slayers to form a stronger club. The league began play in Summer 2011. The Slayers finished the inaugural regular season in second place, their best ever finish, before being defeated by the Philadelphia Fight in the playoffs.

In the 2012 preseason the Slayers played against Jamaican team Hurricanes Rugby League in Kingston in the first ever international club match on Jamaican soil, losing 66–29.

== USARL season summaries ==
C=Champions, R=Runners-Ups, F=Finished first, P=Playoff Appearance, L=Finished Last (Brackets Represent Playoff Games)
Competition	Games Played	Games Won	Games Drawn	Games Lost	Ladder Position	C	R	F	P	L	Coach	Captain	Notes
2011 USARL season	8 (1)	7 (0)	0	1 (1)	2/8				X		Danny Hanson	Tim Douglas	Best Regular Season Finish
2012 USARL season	8 (1)	5 (0)	0	3 (1)	4/8				X		Danny Hanson	Tim Douglas	

== Logo and colors ==
For their inaugural American National Rugby League season the club adopted the colors of red, white and blue but the home uniforms are predominantly red, while the away uniforms are predominantly white. They have a team partnership with the St George Illawarra Dragons of Australia's National Rugby League (NRL).

== Home and practice fields ==
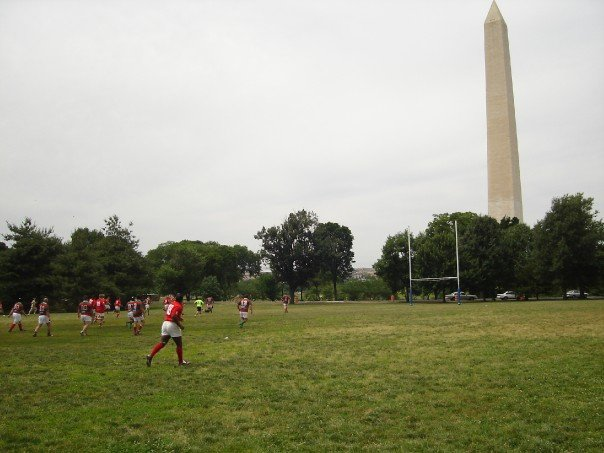
Washington DC Slayers Former Home Ground

The Slayers' home field is Duke Ellington Field near Georgetown University Hospital in Washington. Their practice field is Raoul Wallenberg Memorial Park downtown.

== Statistics and records ==
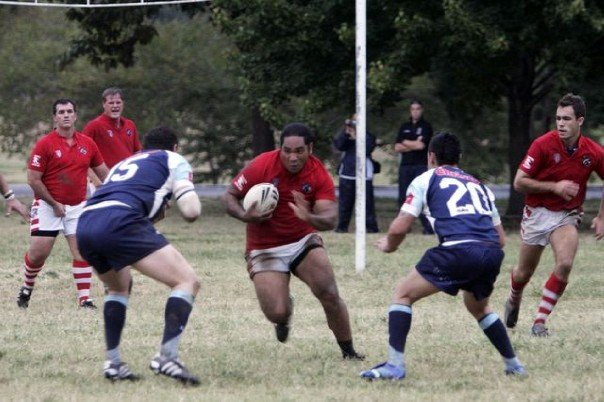

- AMNRL Championship titles: 0
- USARL Championship titles: 0

Biggest winning margin

Margin	Score	Opponent	Venue	Date
50	58 – 8	Boston 13s	M.I.T. Steinbrenner Stadium, Boston	July 30, 2011 (Rd 8)

Biggest losing margin

Margin	Score	Opponent	Venue	Date
50	64 – 14	Glen Mills Bulls	Jack Pearson Stadium	July 1, 2006 (Rd 7)

Most points for the club

Player	Points	Year
Aaron Cook	148 (16 tries, 42 goals)	2011

== See also ==
- Rugby league in the United States
- List of defunct rugby league clubs in the United States
- Washington DC Cavalry
