= Classical High School =

Public magnet school in Providence, Rhode Island, US

Coordinates: 41°49′3.72″N 71°25′14.15″W

Location
- 770 Westminster Street; Providence, Rhode Island 02903; United States

Information
- Type: Public, Magnet
- Motto: Certare, Petere, Reperire, Neque Cedere (To Strive, to Seek, to Find, and Not to Yield)
- Established: March 20, 1843; 183 years ago
- Principal: Scott Barr
- Faculty: 64.00 (FTE)
- Grades: 9–12
- Gender: Coeducational
- Enrollment: 1,113 (2022-23)
- Student to teacher ratio: 17.39
- Campus: Urban
- Colors: Purple & white
- Mascot: Lady Purple/Athena
- Communities served: Providence, Rhode Island, United States
- Website: www.classicalhighschool.org
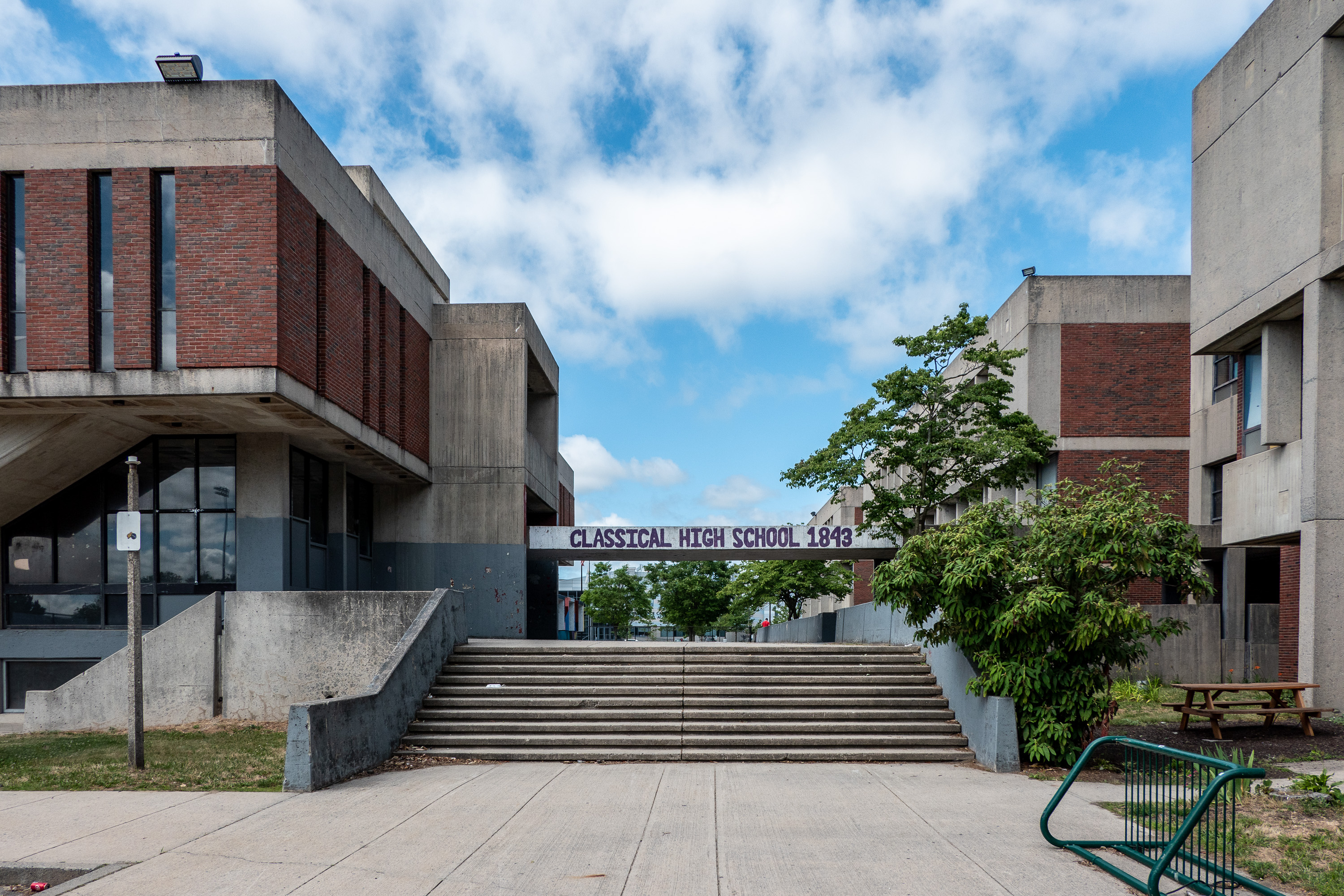
- Cahir Street View

Classical High School, founded in 1843, is a public magnet school in the Providence School District, in Providence, Rhode Island. It was originally an all-male school but has since become co-ed. Classical's motto is Certare, Petere, Reperire, Neque Cedere, a Latin translation of the famous phrase taken from Tennyson's poem "Ulysses", "To Strive, to Seek, to Find, and Not to Yield". Classical High School stands roughly at the intersection of the Federal Hill, West End, and Upper South Providence neighborhoods.

== Architecture ==
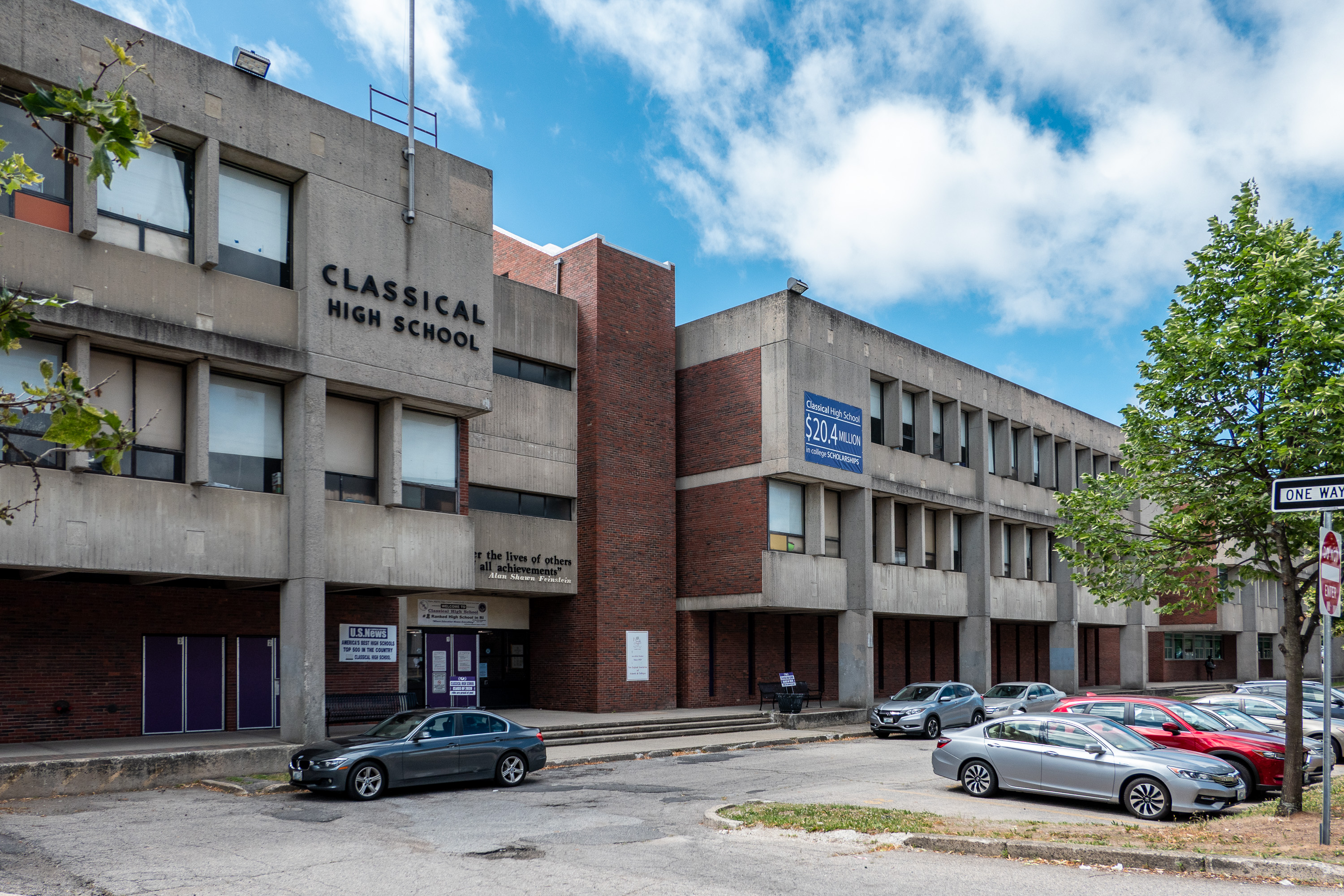
Westminster Street facade

Classical High School's current building was finished in 1970 and is one of few buildings in the area created in the Brutalist architectural style. The original school buildings had become outdated by the 1950s and after several fires and years of study, the city launched a competition for a new education complex in 1963. The winning design was by noted local architects Harkness & Geddes in collaboration with Walter Gropius, who founded The Architects Collaborative (TAC), the famous Boston architectural firm.

William McKenzie Woodward, a well-known architectural historian and staff member of the Rhode Island Historical Preservation & Heritage Commission, does not agree aesthetically with the building, going so far as to write in his Guide to Providence Architecture, "It's no wonder Modernism has gotten such a bad reputation in Rhode Island because it smells very bad there." In 1986 McKenzie had however admitted in his survey for the Preservation Commission that "The new complex, the first of its kind in Providence built to serve a stable rather than expanding population, was well received as an ample and functional facility." Quoting John Ware Lincoln, then chairman of the Division of Design at Rhode Island School of Design as having noted: "The new Classical buildings are fine architecture, by the old standards, but they are also exemplary of the new concept of the architect as an environmental planner, working with social and civic sciences, demography, transportation engineering, building technologies, and, in this case, education philosophy."

The previous building, designed by Martin & Hall, was a yellow brick building with a peaked roof (under which was the study hall). It was considerably smaller and was bounded by Pond Street, which was consumed in the creation of the new campus. When the old building was razed the yellow bricks were sold to students and alumni.

== Alumni ==
- Vernon Alden (Class of 1941) – Scholar, philanthropist, and 15th president of Ohio University
- John M. Barry (Class of 1964) – American author and historian
- Steve Cascione (Class of 1972) – Meteorologist
- Andy Coakley (Class of 1900) - Major League Baseball pitcher
- Joel Cohen (Class of 1959) – American musician specializing in early music repertoires
- Lauren Corrao (Class of 1979) – television executive
- Clark Coolidge (Class of 1956) – Poet and Jazz Musician
- Amy Diaz (Class of 2001) – co-host of "Social Women" & Miss Earth United States 2009
- John W. Dower (Class of 1955) – Pulitzer Prize winner
- Ronald Dworkin (Class of 1949) – Legal Philosopher & Professor at NYU
- C. M. Eddy, Jr. – Author known for his horror, mystery and supernatural short stories
- Jorge Elorza (Class of 1994) - Mayor of Providence
- Stanley Fish (Class of 1955) – Literary theorist and legal scholar
- Rudolph Fisher (Class of 1915) – pioneering Black radiologist and writer of the Harlem Renaissance
- Gordon D. Fox (Class of 1979) – American politician from Providence, Rhode Island and the Speaker of the Rhode Island House of Representatives
- Allan Fung (Class of 1988) – American politician and the first Asian-American mayor of Cranston, Rhode Island
- Robin Green (Class of 1963) – Emmy Award and Golden Globe Award-winning writer and producer; worked extensively on the HBO hit series The Sopranos and Northern Exposure; creator and executive producer for Blue Bloods
- Charles L. Hodges (Class of 1865) – U.S. Army major general, attended in 1861
- Gilbert V. Indeglia (Class of 1959) – Justice on the Rhode Island Supreme Court
- Frederick Irving (Class of 1939) – United States Ambassador to Iceland from 1972 to 1976, Assistant Secretary of State for Oceans and International Environmental and Scientific Affairs from 1976 to 1977, and United States Ambassador to Jamaica from 1977 to 1978
- Michael Kang (Class of 1988) – Filmmaker
- Frank Licht (Class of 1934) – Former Governor of Rhode Island
- Albert Lythgoe (Class of 1886) – Egyptologist, and curator of the New York Metropolitan Museum of Art
- George Macready (Class of 1917) – Film actor
- Paul Mecurio (Class of 1978) – Emmy Award and Peabody Award winning comedy writer, producer, director and performer
- Joan Nathan (Class of 1961) – Award-winning author of cookbooks & Producer TV documentaries on the subject of Jewish cuisine
- Joe Nocera (Class of 1970) – American business journalist and author, business columnist for The New York Times
- Curly Oden (Class of 1917) – National Football League running back
- John O. Pastore (Class of 1925) – Former Governor of Rhode Island, United States Senator
- Jeremy Peña (Class of 2015) - Current starting shortstop for the Houston Astros of Major League Baseball
- S. J. Perelman (Class of 1922) – American Humorist
- Anaridis Rodriguez (Class of 2002) - Former Weather Channel personality and current CBS Boston News anchor
- Melanie Sanford (Class of 1993) – American chemist, and Arthur F. Thurnau Professor of Chemistry at University of Michigan
- A. O. Scott – Chief movie critic for The New York Times
- Bruce M. Selya (Class of 1951) – senior federal judge on the United States Court of Appeals for the First Circuit and chief judge of the United States Foreign Intelligence Surveillance Court of Review
- Bruce Sundlun (Class of 1938) – Former Governor of Rhode Island
- Angel Taveras (Class of 1988) – First Latino Mayor of Providence
- Ralph Thomas Walker (Class of 1907) – Architect, President of the American Institute of Architects
- Richard Walton (Class of 1946) – American writer, teacher, and politician
- Hannah Weiner (Class of 1946) – American poet
