= USARL Grand Final =

- Teams: 2
- First meeting: 2011
- Latest meeting: 2024
- Next meeting: 2025
- Broadcasters: Youtube TV and Facebook Live
- Stadiums: Hodges Stadium, Atlanta Silverbacks Park, Nickerson Field

Statistics
- Total meetings: 13
- Most wins: Philadelphia Fight (4 titles)
- Largest victory: Jacksonville 56–16 Brooklyn

The USARL Grand Final is the championship-deciding game of the USA's premier rugby league competition, the USARL. The first was held in 2011.

== Finals ==
Year	Winners	Score	Runner-up	Ref.
2011	Philadelphia Fight	28–26	New Haven Warriors	
2012	Jacksonville Axemen	28–22	Boston 13s	
2013	Philadelphia Fight	28–22	Jacksonville Axemen	
2014	Philadelphia Fight	30–18	Jacksonville Axemen	
2015	Boston 13s	44–12	Atlanta Rhinos	
2016	Philadelphia Fight	42–20	Jacksonville Axemen	
2017	Atlanta Rhinos	32–18	New York Knights	
2018	Jacksonville Axemen	56–16	Brooklyn Kings RLFC	
2019	Brooklyn Kings RLFC	12–6	Jacksonville Axemen	
2020	Not held due to COVID-19			
2021	Tampa Mayhem	60–10	Delaware Black Foxes	
2022	Jacksonville Axemen	36–12	Tampa Mayhem	
2023	Santa Rosa Dead Pelicans	20–16	Jacksonville Axemen	
2024	DC Cavalry	w/o	Provo Broncos	
2025	Brooklyn Kings RLFC	34-18	Jacksonville Axemen	

=== Winners ===
	Club	Wins	Last win	Runners-up	Last final lost
1	Philadelphia Fight	4	2016	0	—N/a
2	Jacksonville Axemen	3	2022	6	2025
3	Brooklyn Kings RLFC	2	2025	1	2018
4	Boston 13s	1	2015	1	2012
4	Atlanta Rhinos	1	2017	1	2015
4	Tampa Mayhem	1	2021	1	2022
7	DC Cavalry	1	2024	0	—N/a
7	Santa Rosa Dead Pelicans	1	2023	0	—N/a
9	New York Knights RLFC	0	—N/a	1	2017
9	New Haven Warriors	0	—N/a	1	2011
9	Provo Broncos	0	—N/a	1	2024

== See also ==
- NRL Grand Final
- NRL Women's Grand Final
- AMNRL
- List of American rugby league champions
