= List of American rugby league champions =

Rugby League in the United States has crowned national champions since 1997.

The sport has gone through two separate competitions starting with the American National Rugby League (AMNRL) premiership from 1997 to 2014 with the Ferrainola Cup and the USA Rugby League has crowned national champions since 2014.

== Champions of the American National Rugby League (AMNRL) ==
Each year the clubs in the AMNRL domestic competition contest the C.D.Ferrainola Cup to determine the champion team of rugby league in America. Cosimo 'Sam' Ferrainola was one of the driving forces behind the development of the American National Rugby League.

The regular season title or Minor premiership was not awarded until the 2006 season.

AMNRL Championship Final History
Year	Champions	Final score	Runners-up	Minor Premiers
1998	Glen Mills Bulls	66-12	Philadelphia Bulldogs	
1999	Glen Mills Bulls	28-10	New Jersey Sharks	
2000	Glen Mills Bulls	38-26	Philadelphia Bulldogs	
2001	Glen Mills Bulls	26-16	Media Mantarays	
2002	New York Knights	18-12	Glen Mills Bulls	
2003	Connecticut Wildcats	38-14	Glen Mills Bulls	
2004	Glen Mills Bulls	32-24	Connecticut Wildcats	
2005	Glen Mills Bulls	32-30	Connecticut Wildcats	
2006	Connecticut Wildcats	36-28	Glen Mills Bulls	Glen Mills Bulls
2007	Connecticut Wildcats	22-18	Aston DSC Bulls	Connecticut Wildcats
2008	New Haven Warriors	50-18	Aston DSC Bulls	Aston DSC Bulls
2009	New York Knights	32-12	Jacksonville Axemen	Jacksonville Axemen
2010	Jacksonville Axemen	34-14	New Haven Warriors	New Haven Warriors
2011	New York Knights	38-4	Connecticut Wildcats	New York Knights
2012	New York Knights	60-40	Connecticut Wildcats	New York Knights
2013	Connecticut Wildcats	42-10	New York Knights	

By 2011, Seven teams that had previously competed in the American National Rugby League, the United States' established rugby league organization and recognized governing body for the sport, announced they were breaking with the AMNRL to form a new league. The stated reason for the split was dissatisfaction with the governance of the AMNRL; the departing teams were unhappy with the lack of club involvement in the league's decision making, and the new league was founded with the principle of including its member clubs in its administration, thus creating the USA Rugby League after the 2011 season.

== USA Rugby League Champions ==
In 2014, the United States Association of Rugby League became to undisputed top-level national after the American National Rugby League folded and the Rugby League European Federation and the Rugby League International Federation gave the USA Rugby League member status. The league began its rivalry with the former by beginning its inaugural in 2011.

For the first three seasons, the USA Rugby League was a single-division competition. In 2014, the teams were split into two conferences and three divisions.

The competition is now structured into four regional leagues across the East and West Conferences. Winners of each league advance to their respective conference final before the winners of each facing each other in the Grand Final.

USA Rugby League Grand Final History
Year	Champions	Final score	Runners-up	Minor Premiers
2011	Philadelphia Fight	28–26	New Haven Warriors	Jacksonville Axemen
2012	Jacksonville Axemen	28–22	Boston 13s	Jacksonville Axemen
2013	Philadelphia Fight	28–22	Jacksonville Axemen	Philadelphia Fight
2014	Philadelphia Fight	30–18	Jacksonville Axemen	Philadelphia Fight
2015	Boston 13s	44–12	Atlanta Rhinos	Philadelphia Fight
2016	Philadelphia Fight	42–20	Jacksonville Axemen	Philadelphia Fight
2017	Atlanta Rhinos	32–18	New York Knights	New York Knights
2018	Jacksonville Axemen	56–16	Brooklyn Kings	Jacksonville Axemen
2019	Brooklyn Kings	12–6	Jacksonville Axemen	Brooklyn Kings
2020	Not held due to COVID-19			
2021	Tampa Mayhem	60–10	Delaware Black Foxes	Jacksonville Axemen
2022	Jacksonville Axemen	36–12	Tampa Mayhem	Jacksonville Axemen
2023	Santa Rosa Dead Pelicans	20–16	Jacksonville Axemen	Not awarded. Regional titles awarded instead
2024	DC Cavalry	Walkover	Provo Broncos	Not awarded. Regional titles awarded instead
2025	Brooklyn Kings	34–18	Jacksonville Axemen	Not awarded. Regional titles awarded instead
2026	Tampa Mayhem	30–26	Los Angeles Roosters	Not awarded. Regional titles awarded instead

== Overall Championship Title Count ==
Club	Years active	USA Rugby League titles	AMNRL titles	Total Number of Titles
Glen Mills Bulls	1998-2013		1998-2001, 2004, 2005	6
Jacksonville Axemen	2006-	2012, 2018, 2022	2010	4
Connecticut Wildcats	2003-2015		2003, 2006, 2007, 2013	4
New York Knights	1998-		2002, 2009, 2011, 2012	4
Philadelphia Fight	1998-2019	2011, 2013, 2014, 2016		4
Tampa Mayhem	2014-	2021, 2026		2
Brooklyn Kings	2014-	2019, 2025		2
DC Cavalry	2021-	2024		1
Santa Rosa Dead Pelicans	2021-	2023		1
Atlanta Rhinos	2014-	2017		1
Boston 13s	2009-	2015		1

The clubs in italics are no longer active in the league.
