= 2026 USARL season =

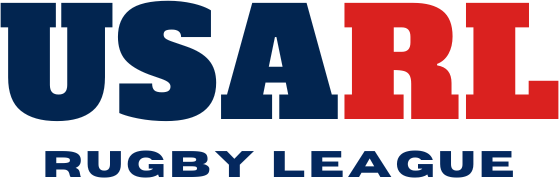
- Structure: Regional Round Robin + Playoffs
- League: USA Rugby League
- Duration: May 30th - August 29th, 2026
- Teams: 13
- Matches played: 38
- Points scored: 2,362 (avg of ~68 per game)
- Broadcast partners: Local & club productions on YouTube
- Champions: Tampa Mayhem (2nd title)
- Biggest home win: Los Angeles Roosters 104-30 San Diego Barracudas (August 1, 2026)
- Biggest away win: Santa Rosa Dead Pelicans 10-114 Sacramento Immortals (June 6, 2026)

The 2026 USA Rugby League season was the 29th season overall of men's amateur and semi-professional rugby league competition in the United States and the 14th season under the governance of the USARL.

== League updates and notes ==
=== Expansion, departures, relocation, and return of the Western Conference ===
USARL began with an expansion to 19 (later 18) clubs and a return to the West Coast of the US, with the Western Conference reinstated. The URLA (Utah Rugby League Association) continues to operate independently until the two parties reach an agreement. Los Angeles Mongrel and West LA Jackrabbits will not officially participate in the league.

The West expands to nine teams with the return of Los Angeles Bandidos & Sacramento Immortals, the entry of 916ers Rugby (later merged with Sacramento Immortals), and the addition of Bay Area 808s and West LA Renegades, both associated with the Wide Bay Renegades in Bundaberg, Queensland, Australia. This will also be the first official league season of the Los Angeles Roosters, which is operated by USARL partner and NRL club Sydney Roosters.

In the Eastern Conference, the 2017 national champions, Atlanta Rhinos, pulled out of the season; it is currently unknown whether they will return to play, as the club has not officially folded. The Southwest Florida Copperheads, originally founded in Naples, FL, have moved to Atlanta, GA, and rebranded as the Atlanta Copperheads. The conference expands to 10 teams with the entry of the Sarasota Bull Sharks from Sarasota, FL , and the return of the four-time national champion, the New York Knights, after the Super League club, York Knights, announced a partnership and the revival of the club and its brand.

On May 19th, 2026, via its social media pages, the USARL announced 13 clubs that have met league requirements and are thus eligible to compete for the national championship.

== Teams ==
The league officially consists of 13 teams, an increase of eleven from the previous season. Each league is split by coast into three conferences, as the East is split into the Northeast and Southeast conferences. While the West will be one California conference.

=== USARL East ===
Northeast Conference (Rugby League United)
Club	Founded	City (MSA)	Stadium	National Titles (Last)
Boston Bears	2014	Boston, MA	Briggs Field	1 (2015)
Brooklyn Kings RLFC	2006	Brooklyn, NY	Randalls Island Field 10	2 (2025)
DC Cavalry	2021	Washington, DC	Battleground Athletic Complex	1 (2024)
Delaware Black Foxes	2015	Wilmington, Delaware	Eden Park	0
New York Knights	1997	New York City, NY	Pelham Bay Park	4 (2012)^{4}

Southeast Conference (Florida Rugby League)
Club	Founded	City (MSA)	Stadium	National Titles (Last)
Atlanta Copperheads	2018	Atlanta, GA	Roswell Area Park	0
Jacksonville Axemen	2006	Jacksonville, FL	Rock Stadium	4 (2022)^{4}
Sarasota Bull Sharks	2025	Sarasota, FL	Sarasota Rugby Club	0
Tampa Mayhem	2014	Tampa, FL	Leto High School	1 (2021)

=== USARL West ===
California Conference
Club	Founded	City (MSA)	Stadium	National Titles (Last)
Los Angeles Roosters	2022	Los Angeles, CA	Warren High School	0
Sacramento Immortals	2019	Sacramento, CA	Danny Nunn Park	0
San Diego Barracudas	2020	San Diego, CA	Torrey Pines High School	0
Santa Rosa Dead Pelicans	2018	Santa Rosa, CA	For Pete's Sake Field	1 (2023)

== Regular Season ==
=== USARL East ===
==== Southeastern Conference - Week 1 ====
Southeast Conference Week 1
Home	Score	Away	Match Information		
Home	Score	Away	Date and Time (EST)	Venue	Report
Jacksonville Axemen	90 - 0	Atlanta Copperheads	June 6, 2026/7:00 PM	Rock Stadium	
Tampa Mayhem	56 - 10	Sarasota Bull Sharks	June 6, 2026/6:30 PM	Leto High School	

==== Southeastern Conference - Week 2 ====
Southeast Conference Week 2
Home	Score	Away	Match Information		
Home	Score	Away	Date and Time (EST)	Venue	Report
Sarasota Bull Sharks	16 - 28	Jacksonville Axemen	June 13, 2026/6:00 PM	Sarasota Rugby Club	
Tampa Mayhem	94 - 4	Atlanta Copperheads	June 13, 2026/6:30 PM	Leto High School	

==== Southeastern Conference - Week 3 ====
Southeast Conference Week 3
Home	Score	Away	Match Information		
Home	Score	Away	Date and Time (EST)	Venue	Report
Jacksonville Axemen	6 - 52	Tampa Mayhem	June 20, 2026/6:00PM	Rock Stadium	
Atlanta Copperheads	6 - 42	Sarasota Bull Sharks	June 20, 2026/7:00PM	Roswell Area Park	

==== Southeastern Conference - Week 4 ====
Southeast Conference Week 4
Home	Score	Away	Match Information		
Home	Score	Away	Date and Time (EST)	Venue	Report
Sarasota Bull Sharks	12 - 50	Tampa Mayhem	June 27, 2026/6:00 PM	Sarasota Rugby Club	
Atlanta Copperheads	0 - 78	Jacksonville Axemen	June 27, 2026/6:45 PM	Roswell Area Park	

==== Southeastern Conference - Week 5 ====
Southeast Conference Week 5
Home	Score	Away	Match Information		
Home	Score	Away	Date and Time (EST)	Venue	Report
Sarasota Bull Sharks	50 - 0	Atlanta Copperheads	July 11, 2026/TBD	Wilkinson Road	
Tampa Mayhem	34 - 10	Jacksonville Axemen	July 11, 2026/6:30 PM	Leto High School	

==== Southeastern Conference - Week 6 ====
Southeast Conference Week 6
Home	Score	Away	Match Information		
Home	Score	Away	Date and Time (EST)	Venue	Report
Jacksonville Axemen	48 - 22	Sarasota Bull Sharks	July 18, 2026/6:30 PM	Rock Stadium	
Atlanta Copperheads	0 - 50	Tampa Mayhem	July 18, 2026/TBD	Roswell Area Park	

==== Northeastern Conference - Week 1 ====
Northeast Conference Week 1
Home	Score	Away	Match Information		
Home	Score	Away	Date and Time (EST)	Venue	Report
Delaware Black Foxes	30 - 44	New York Knights	June 6, 2026/4:00PM	Eden Park	
DC Cavalry	34 - 26	Brooklyn Kings RLFC	June 6, 2026/11:30 AM	Battleground Athletic Complex	

==== Northeastern Conference - Week 2 ====
Northeast Conference Week 2
Home	Score	Away	Match Information		
Home	Score	Away	Date and Time (EST)	Venue	Report
New York Knights	52 - 22	Brooklyn Kings RLFC	June 13, 2026/11:00 AM	Pelham Bay Park	
Delaware Black Foxes	68 - 24	Boston Bears	June 13, 2026/4:00 PM	Eden Park	

==== Northeastern Conference - Week 3 ====
Northeast Conference Week 3
Home	Score	Away	Match Information		
Home	Score	Away	Date and Time (EST)	Venue	Report
DC Cavalry	40 - 30	New York Knights	June 20, 2026/11:00AM	Battleground Athletic Complex	
Boston Bears	50 - 0	Brooklyn Kings RLFC	June 20, 2026/TBD	Briggs Field	

==== Northeastern Conference - Week 4 ====
Northeast Conference Week 4
Home	Score	Away	Match Information		
Home	Score	Away	Date and Time (EST)	Venue	Report
Boston Bears	10 - 94	New York Knights	June 27, 2026/11:45 AM	Briggs Field	
DC Cavalry	62 - 16	Delaware Black Foxes	June 27, 2026/4:00 PM	Battleground Athletic Complex	

==== Northeastern Conference - Week 5 ====
Northeast Conference Week 5
Home	Score	Away	Match Information		
Home	Score	Away	Date and Time (EST)	Venue	Report
New York Knights	76 - 6	Delaware Black Foxes	July 11, 2026/11:00 AM	Pelham Bay Park	
Boston Bears	0 - 82	DC Cavalry	July 11, 2026/12:30 PM	Briggs Field	

==== Northeastern Conference - Week 6 ====
Northeast Conference Week 6
Home	Score	Away	Match Information		
Home	Score	Away	Date and Time (EST)	Venue	Report
New York Knights	58 - 6	DC Cavalry	July 18, 2026/TBD	Pelham Bay Park	

=== USARL West ===
==== California Conference - Week 1 ====
California Conference Week 1
Home	Score	Away	Match Information		
Home	Score	Away	Date and Time (PST)	Venue	Report
Santa Rosa Dead Pelicans	10 - 114	Sacramento Immortals	June 6, 2026/12:00 PM	For Pete's Sake Field	
Los Angeles Roosters	94 - 12	San Diego Barracudas	June 6, 2026/6:30 PM	Mira Costa West Field	

==== California Conference - Week 2 ====
California Conference Week 2
Home	Score	Away	Match Information		
Home	Score	Away	Date and Time (PST)	Venue	Report
Los Angeles Roosters	50 - 0	Santa Rosa Dead Pelicans	June 20, 2026/3:00 PM	Warren High School	
San Diego Barracudas	12 - 104	Sacramento Immortals	June 20, 2026/7:30 PM	4S Ranch Sports Park	

==== California Conference - Week 3 ====
California Conference Week 3
Home	Score	Away	Match Information		
Home	Score	Away	Date and Time (PST)	Venue	Report
San Diego Barracudas	0 - 50	Los Angeles Roosters	July 11, 2026/7:00 PM	Torrey Pines High School	
Sacramento Immortals	50 - 0	Santa Rosa Dead Pelicans	July 18, 2026/12:00 PM	Danny Nunn Park	

==== California Conference - Week 4 ====
California Conference Week 4
Home	Score	Away	Match Information		
Home	Score	Away	Date and Time (PST)	Venue	Report
Santa Rosa Dead Pelicans	64 - 54	San Diego Barracudas	July 25, 2026/3:00 PM	For Pete's Sake Rugby Ground	
Sacramento Immortals	30 - 44	Los Angeles Roosters	July 25, 2026/3:00 PM	Danny Nunn Park	

==== California Conference - Week 5 ====
California Conference Week 5
Home	Score	Away	Match Information		
Home	Score	Away	Date and Time (PST)	Venue	Report
Los Angeles Roosters	104 - 30	San Diego Barracudas	August 1, 2026/6:30 PM	Warren High School	
Santa Rosa Dead Pelicans	0 - 50	Sacramento Immortals	August 1, 2026/4:00 PM	For Pete's Sake Rugby Ground	

==== California Conference - Week 6 ====
California Conference Week 6
Home	Score	Away	Match Information		
Home	Score	Away	Date and Time (PST)	Venue	Report
San Diego Barracudas	4 - 82	Los Angeles Roosters	August 15, 2026/6:30 PM	Torrey Pines High School	
Sacramento Immortals	NR	Santa Rosa Dead Pelicans	August 15, 2026/TBD	Danny Nunn Park	

== Standings ==
Legend
Conference Final

=== USARL East ===
Northeast Conference
Pos	Team	Pld	W	D	L	PF	PA	PD	Pts	Qualification
1	New York Knights (A)	5	4	0	1	220	102	+118	8	Conference Final
2	DC Cavalry (A)(N)	5	4	0	1	224	130	+94	8	Conference Final
3	Delaware Black Foxes	5	2	3	0	148	128	+20	4	
4	Boston Bears	5	2	0	3	82	146	-44	4	
5	Brooklyn Kings	5	0	0	5	48	86	-38	0	

(N) ^{Northeast Champion} (A) ^{Advances to Conference Final}

Southeast Conference
Pos	Team	Pld	W	D	L	PF	PA	PD	Pts	Qualification
1	Tampa Mayhem (A)(S)	6	6	0	0	268	42	+226	12	Conference Final
2	Jacksonville Axemen (A)	6	4	2	0	212	102	+110	8	Conference Final
3	Sarasota Bull Sharks	6	3	3	0	144	140	+4	6	
4	Atlanta Copperheads	6	0	6	0	10	318	-308	-2	

(S) ^{Southeast Champion} (A) ^{Advances to Conference Final}

=== USARL West ===
California Conference
Pos	Team	Pld	W	D	L	PF	PA	PD	Pts	Qualification
1	Los Angeles Roosters (W)(Q)	6	6	0	0	420	76	+344	12	National Final
2	Sacramento Immortals	5	4	0	1	348	66	+282	8	
3	Santa Rosa Dead Pelicans	5	1	0	4	74	268	-194	-2	
4	San Diego Barracudas	6	0	0	6	112	444	-332	-2	

(Q) ^{Qualified for National Championship Final} (W) ^{West Champion}

== Post Season ==
=== Regional and Conference Playoffs ===
Northeast Conference Final
Home	Score	Away	Match Information		
Home	Score	Away	Date and Time (PST)	Venue	Report
New York Knights	24 - 44	DC Cavalry	August 1, 2026/1:30 PM	Abessinio Stadium	

Southeast Conference Final
Home	Score	Away	Match Information		
Home	Score	Away	Date and Time (PST)	Venue	Report
Tampa Mayhem	60 - 6	Jacksonville Axemen	August 1, 2026/6:30 PM	Leto High School	

East Coast Playoff Final
Home	Score	Away	Match Information		
Home	Score	Away	Date and Time (PST)	Venue	Report
DC Cavalry	32 - 48	Tampa Mayhem	August 15, 2026/6:30 PM	Battleground Athletic Complex	

=== National Championship Final ===
USA Rugby League National Championship
Home	Score	Away	Match Information		
Home	Score	Away	Date and Time (EST)	Venue	Report
Los Angeles Roosters	26 - 30	Tampa Mayhem	August 29, 2026/2:00 PM	Leuzinger High School	
