= Atlanta Copperheads =

Rugby League Football Club in Atlanta, GA

Club information
- Full name: Atlanta Copperheads; Rugby League Football Club
- Nickname: Copperheads
- Colours: Copper, Brown, Black, & White
- Founded: 2018; 8 years ago
- Website: http://copperheadsrlfc.com

Current details
- Ground: Roswell Area Park
- CEO: Curtis Goddard
- Coach: Derek McVey
- Competition: USA Rugby League
- 2026: 4th in Southeast Rugby League

Records
- Minor premierships: 2024 Florida RL (2024)

The Atlanta Copperheads are an American rugby league team based in Atlanta, Georgia. From 2018 to 2025, the team was based out of Naples, Florida, and was known as the Southwest Florida Copperheads. The team currently competes in the Southeast Conference of the USA Rugby League.

== History ==
The club was founded in 2018 as the Southwest Florida Copperheads, based out of Naples, Florida.

In 2022, the Copperheads announced a partnership with Salford RLFC.

The club moved from Florida to Atlanta in November of 2025, rebranding as the Atlanta Copperheads.

== Current squad ==
Squad for the 2026 USARL season.

- 1.Roderigus Ceasar (Fullback)
- 2.Sam Dunn (Wing)
- 3.Beau Hufton (Centre)
- 4.Khalial Harris (Centre)
- 5.Brent Coles (Wing)
- 6.Damian Dudley (Five-eighth)
- 7.Corbin Gibson (Halfback)
- 8.Jacob Siler (Prop)
- 9.Isaiah Jackson (Hooker)
- 10.Sheldon Kelly (Prop)
- 11.Quentin Koonce (Second-row)
- 12.Sean Hunt (Second-row)
- 13.Avyon Tufano (Lock)

== 2018 season ==
Date	Opponent	Home/Away	Location	Result	Score
6/9	Atlanta Rhinos	Home	Lehigh Senior High School, Lehigh Acres, Florida	L	6-58
6/16	Tampa Mayhem	Home	Lehigh Senior High School, Lehigh Acres, Florida	L	22-52
6/30	Jacksonville Axemen	Away	UNF Rugby Field, Jacksonville, Florida	L	4-90
7/14	Atlanta Rhinos	Away	Atlanta Silverbacks Park, Atlanta, Georgia	L	0-74
7/21	Jacksonville Axemen	Home	Lehigh Senior High School, Lehigh Acres, Florida	L	10-62
7/28	Tampa Mayhem	Away	Tampa Catholic High School, Tampa, Florida	L	32-40
8/4	Jacksonville Axemen	Away	UNF Rugby Field, Jacksonville, Florida	L	0-88

== 2019 season ==
Date	Opponent	Home/Away	Location	Result	Score
5/25	Jacksonville Axemen	Home	Lehigh Senior High School, Lehigh Acres, Florida	L	14-42

== USARL season summaries ==
Atlanta Copperheads History
Competition	Games Played	Games Won	Games Drawn	Games Lost	Ladder Position	C	R	F	P	L	Coach	Captain	Notes
2018	6	0	0	6	11/11					*	Curtis Goddard		Club foundation season
2019	6	4**	0	2	10/11						Curtis Goddard		8-point season deduction and forfeit. Missed playoffs
2020	No season due to the COVID-19 pandemic										Curtis Goddard	No season due to the COVID-19 pandemic	
2021	6	2	0	4	4/6						Curtis Goddard		Missed playoffs
2022	6	2	0	4	3/4						Curtis Goddard		Missed playoffs
2023	6	0	1	5	12/12					*	Curtis Goddard		Missed playoffs
2024	6 (1)	5	0	1	3/20				*		Curtis Goddard		Florida Rugby League Champions (W, 30-18 vs Jacksonville) National Semifinalist (L, 64-50 vs DC Cavalry)
2025	6	2	0	4	5/7						Curtis Goddard		Missed playoffs
2026	6	0	6	0	4/4						Curtis Goddard		Missed playoffs

== See also ==
- Rugby league in the United States
