= Cleveland Rugby League =

US rugby league club, based in Cleveland, Ohio

Club information
- Full name: Cleveland Rugby League
- Nickname: Cleveland
- Colours: Red, yellow and black
- Founded: 2018; 8 years ago

Current details
- Ground: Cleveland Rovers RFC (N/A)
- Coach: Mark Subinsky
- Captain: Monte Gaddis & Sterling Wynn
- Competition: North American Rugby League

The Cleveland Rugby League are an American amateur rugby league football club based in Cleveland, Ohio. They were a founding member of the new North American Rugby League that formed in 2021, but failed to launch. Currently the club runs as a USARL independent.

== History ==
=== Founding, NARL and First match (2018 - 2021) ===
The Cleveland Rugby League team were first established in 2018 by Toronto Wolfpack trialist, Monte Gaddis. Initially they planned to start the Midwest Rugby League Conference where they would play a rugby league 9s game against the Chicago Stockyarders.

Cleveland's first match was against USA Rugby League club, the Northern Virginia Eagles.

On 31 March 2021 it was announced a new professional North American Rugby League competition with 14 teams taking part, including Cleveland Rugby League. Cleveland played one exhibition team against the Atlanta Rhinos before the competition folded.

On 19 April 2021 it was announced that experienced Australian coach Glenn Morrison had been appointed as Director of Rugby; Morrison has previously been head coach at Dewsbury Rams, in the RFL Championship and the Jamaican national team.

=== Post-NARL, Outlaws and present day (2022 - present) ===
In 2023, Cleveland introduced a women's team known as the Cleveland Outlaws. In April of that year, both teams would play a cross border club friendly versus ORL Champions, Toronto City Saints and Ontario Ospreys. The event was titled, "Battle of the Great Lakes" and played at Baldwin Wallace University's George Finnie Stadium. Cleveland scored early tries to lead 14–12 at the half time but Toronto would rally to a 34–22 victory. As for the Outlaws, they would be defeated by the Ospreys with a score of 64–0. The men's side would go on to participate in 2023 USARL Naples Nines, finishing 8th of 12 teams, afterwards they would also participate in the Cleveland Beach 5s, a beach rugby tournament hosted by Cleveland Crusaders RUFC. CRL Men's would finish 5th, repeating the result from 2022.

In 2024, Outlaws partnered with regional side Midwest Rouge Runners. The ladies would play a friendly against Ontario Ospreys at York University, falling 30–22 after being ahead for periods of the match.

== Current Squad ==
The list of the Men's side are from matches including Battle of the Great Lakes versus Toronto City and Naples Nines.

Flags of Nationality are next to the players' names.

(as of May 20, 2023)

Position.	Player	Position	Player	Position	Player
Back	Sterling Wynn (C) (United States)	Utility	Peter Garlando (Australia) (United States)	Forward	Jalen Peeples (United States)
Back	Monte Gaddis (C) (United States)	Utility	Tyrone Lyons (United States)	Forward	Dante Camboni (United States)
Back	Phen Johnson (United States)	Utility	Tyson Riggins (United States)	Forward	Garrett O'Connell (United States)
Back	Dayshawn Garr (United States)	Utility	Cameron Taylor (United States)		
Back	Devon Range (United States)	Forward	Keith Harris (United States)		
Back	Daejon Street (United States)	Forward	Cory Graham (United States)		
Back	Dayne Karlovec (United States)	Forward	Elijah Tchilembe (United States) (Democratic Republic of the Congo)		
Back	Brent Coles (United States)	Forward	Charles Wroten (United States)		
Back	Damontae Gaither (United States)	Forward	Evan Bradshaw (United States)		
