= Brooklyn Kings RLFC =

Rugby League Football Club in Brooklyn, NY

Club information
- Full name: Brooklyn Kings Rugby League Football Club
- Nickname: Kings
- Founded: 2014; 12 years ago

Current details
- Ground: Bushwick Inlet Park
- Manager: Brent Richardson
- Competition: USA Rugby League
- 2026 USARL season: 5th Northeast Conference

Records
- Champions: 2019, 2025
- Runners-up: 2018
- Minor premierships: 2019

The Brooklyn Kings RLFC are a Rugby league team based in Brooklyn, New York. The club was formed in 2014 under the auspices of the USA Rugby League and currently competes in the Northeast Rugby League. The club's colours are blue, gold, and white.

== History ==
The Brooklyn Kings RLFC were founded in 2014 by Australian immigrants Matt Bailey and Justin Coffman, with most of the team consisting of former American football players from Brooklyn and Queens. The team played their first game on May 31 of that year, a draw against the Rhode Island Rebellion.

The Brooklyn Kings reached their first USARL Grand Final in 2018, losing to the Jacksonville Axemen 56-16, at the University of North Florida. The following season, the Kings won their first USARL championship with a 12-6 victory over the Axemen.

In early 2021, the Kings were one of several USARL clubs named as part of the planned North American Rugby League, though that league never began play and the Kings would return to the USARL in 2022, although the team would not resume play in the 2023 season.

The Kings would win their second Grand Final in 2025, once again defeating the Jacksonville Axemen by a score of 34-18. Brooklyn prop Anthony Russo was named Man of the Match, leading both teams with two tries.

== Season History ==
Brooklyn Kings RLFC History
C = Champions, R = Runners-Ups, F = Finished first (Minor Premiers), P = Playoff Appearance, L = Finished Last (Brackets Represent Playoff Games)
Competition	Games Played	Games Won	Games Drawn	Games Lost	Ladder Position	C	R	F	P	L	Notes
2014 USARL season	7	1	1	5	10/11						
2015 USARL season	8 (1)	4	0	4 (1)	6/14				P		L, Divisional Semi-Finals vs Rhode Island (54 - 34)
2016 USARL season	8 (1)	4	0	4 (1)	7/14				P		L, Divisional Semi-Finals vs Boston (64 - 40)
2017 USARL season	8	3	0	5	7/12						
2018 USARL season	7 (2)	7	0	0(1)	2/11		R		P		Won North SF vs Knights (20 - 8) Won North Final vs White Plains (34 - 18) Lost National Championship vs Jacksonville (56 - 16)
2019 USARL season	8	8 (3)	0	0	1/11	C		F	P		Won North SF vs Northern Virginia (30 - 0) Won North Final vs Boston (54 - 0) Won National Championship vs Jacksonville (12 - 6) 11-0 Perfect Season
2020 USARL season	❌ Season cancelled (COVID-19)										
2021 USARL season	❌ Did not play (NARL collapse)										
2022 USARL season	1	1	0	0	Exhibition season						
2023 USARL season	❌ Did not compete										
2024 USARL season	6 (1)	5	0	1 (1)	6/18				P		Lost North Final vs DC Cavalry (40 - 28)
2025 USARL season	4 (2)	3 (2)	0	1	4/7	C			P		Won North Final vs DC Cavalry (30 - 36) Won National Championship vs Jacksonville (34 - 18)

== Current squad ==
Squad for the 2026 USARL season.

- 1.Fabion Turner (Fullback)
- 2.Joe Morano (Wing)
- 3.Mike St. Claire (Centre)
- 4.Joshua Blankenship (Centre)
- 5.Raymar Spence (Wing)
- 6.Isaac Frost (Five-eighth)
- 7.Kyle Granby (Halfback)
- 8.Brock Duncan (Prop)
- 9.Ronaldeni Fraser (Hooker)
- 10.Cam Taylor (Prop)
- 11.Khyheem Finley (Second-row)
- 12.Joaquin Escribano (Second-row)
- 13.Scott Christian (Lock)
- 14.Luis Gutierrez
- 15.Yacouba Traore
- 16.Eric Lalley
- 17.Tim Stubbs (Prop)
- 18.Gabe Herrera

== Notable players ==
- Dylan Napa
- Chris McQueen

== Honors ==
USA Rugby League

- National Champions (2): 2019, 2025
- Minor Premiers: 2019

== See also ==
- Sports in Brooklyn
- Rugby Football League expansion
