= 2025 USARL season =

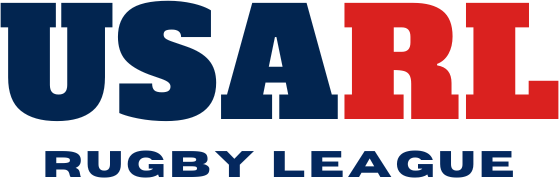
- Structure: Regional Round Robin + Playoffs
- League: USA Rugby League
- Duration: May 31st - August 9th, 2025
- Teams: 7
- Matches played: 20
- Points scored: 1,460 (73.0 points per match)
- Champions: Brooklyn Kings RLFC (2nd title)
- Biggest home win: Jacksonville Axemen 102–0 Miami Shoremen (June 14th)
- Biggest away win: Miami Shoremen 4–100 Jacksonville Axemen (July 12th)

The 2025 USA Rugby League season was the 28th season overall of amateur and semi-professional rugby league competition in the United States and the 13th season under the governance of the USARL.

== League notes ==
Postseason controversy and league contraction

After the end of the 2024 postseason, the Utah Rugby League Association (URLA) had pulled out from USARL play due to differences between the regional body and the national body surrounding eligibility to play in the national championship. The 2024 national final ended with RLU champion DC Cavalry being crowned national champion after the USARL deemed that the Utah champion Provo Broncos were ineligible to play in the final. The URLA will operate independently until the two parties reach an agreement.

In the Spring of 2025, the USARL made a change in voting parity for clubs and changes to the registration policy for clubs. This happened without the knowledge of participating clubs in the West. Also, a change in voting parity led the Pacific Coast Rugby League (PCRL) to withdraw from competition for the 2025 season. It is unknown if the PCRL will return in 2026.

Club changes

Miami Shoremen were introduced as new members of the Florida Rugby League. The club is run by former member South Florida Speed as they retry their hand at rugby league.

Former national champion clubs, Boston Bears and Atlanta Rhinos chose to not participate in the 2025 season. Both clubs may return in 2026.

== Format ==
Due to the temporary contraction of the competition, the format reverts to the pre-expansion method, in which both divisions will play its opponents twice. After the round robin, the top two of each division will playoff for their divisional championship. The winners of the divisional finals will meet for the National Championship at the highest ranked divisional champion.

== Participating clubs ==
Northeast Rugby League
Colors	Club	Founded	City (MSA)	Stadium	National Titles (Last)
	Brooklyn Kings RLFC	2006	Brooklyn	McCarren Park	1 (2019)
	DC Cavalry	2021	Washington Metro	Central Sports Complex	0 (N/A)
	Delaware Black Foxes	2018	Wilmington, Delaware	Eden Park	0 (N/A)

Florida Rugby League
Colors	Club	Founded	City (MSA)	Stadium	National Titles (Last)
	Jacksonville Axemen	2006	Jacksonville, FL	North Rugby Fields at UNF	3 (2022)
	Miami Shoremen	2025	Miami, FL	Lester Brown Park Ives Estate Park	0 (N/A)
	Southwest Florida Copperheads	2018	Naples, FL	Estero Sports Park	0 (N/A)
	Tampa Mayhem	2014	Tampa, FL	Leto High School	1 (2021)

== Regular season ==
=== Week 1 ===
Home	Score	Away	Match Information
Home	Score	Away	Date and Time (EST)	Venue	Report
Tampa Mayhem	82–0	Miami Shoremen	May 31st - 6:30pm	Leto High School
Southwest Florida Copperheads	12–32	Jacksonville Axemen	May 31st - 6:45pm	Estero Sports Park

=== Week 2 ===
Home	Score	Away	Match Information
Home	Score	Away	Date and Time (EST)	Venue	Report
DC Cavalry	70–16	Delaware Black Foxes	June 7th - 10:30am	Central Sports Complex
Southwest Florida Copperheads	30–32	Tampa Mayhem	June 7th - 6:45pm	Estero Sports Park

=== Week 3 ===
Home	Score	Away	Match Information
Home	Score	Away	Date and Time (EST)	Venue	Report
DC Cavalry	58–18	Brooklyn Kings RLFC	June 14th - 10:30am	Central Sports Complex
Jacksonville Axemen	102–0	Miami Shoremen	June 14th - 7:00pm	North Rugby Fields at UNF

=== Week 4 ===
Home	Score	Away	Match Information
Home	Score	Away	Date and Time (EST)	Venue	Report
Delaware Black Foxes	18–44	Brooklyn Kings RLFC	June 21st - 5:00pm	Eden Park
Miami Shoremen	4–82	Southwest Florida Copperheads	June 21st - 5:30pm	Lester Brown Park
Tampa Mayhem	46–16	Jacksonville Axemen	June 21st - 6:30pm	Leto High School

=== Week 5 ===
Home	Score	Away	Match Information
Home	Score	Away	Date and Time (EST)	Venue	Report
Brooklyn Kings RLFC	56–20	Delaware Black Foxes	June 28th - 12:00pm	McCarren Park
Jacksonville Axemen	52–20	Southwest Florida Copperheads	June 28th - 6:30pm	North Rugby Fields at UNF

=== Week 6 ===
Home	Score	Away	Match Information
Home	Score	Away	Date and Time (EST)	Venue	Report
Brooklyn Kings RLFC	58–28	DC Cavalry	July 12th - 1:00pm	McCarren Park
Miami Shoremen	4–100	Jacksonville Axemen	July 12th - 5:30pm	Ives Estate Park
Tampa Mayhem	56–6	Southwest Florida Copperheads	July 12th - 6:30pm	Leto High School

=== Week 7 ===
Home	Score	Away	Match Information
Home	Score	Away	Date and Time (EST)	Venue	Report
Delaware Black Foxes	6–94	DC Cavalry	July 19th - 4:00pm	Eden Park
Southwest Florida Copperheads	80–14	Miami Shoremen	July 19th - 6:45pm	Estero Sports Park
Jacksonville Axemen	32–22	Tampa Mayhem	July 19th - 7:00pm	North Rugby Fields at UNF

== Standings ==
Legend
Advance to Divisional Finals

Northeast Rugby League Standings
#	Team	P	W	T	L	PF	PA	PD	Pts
1	DC Cavalry	4	3	0	1	250	98	+152	6
2	Brooklyn Kings RLFC	4	3	0	1	176	124	+52	6
3	Delaware Black Foxes	4	0	0	4	60	264	-234	0

Florida Rugby League Standings
#	Team	P	W	T	L	PF	PA	PD	Pts
1	Jacksonville Axemen	6	5	0	1	334	94	+240	10
2	Tampa Mayhem	6	5	0	1	274	86	+188	10
3	Southwest Florida Copperheads	6	2	0	4	230	86	+144	4
4	Miami Shoremen	6	0	0	6	22	444	-422	0

== National playoffs ==
Divisional Championships

Home	Score	Away	Match Information
Home	Score	Away	Date and Time (EST)	Venue	Report
DC Cavalry	30–36	Brooklyn Kings RLFC	July 26th - 6:30pm	Eden Park
Jacksonville Axemen	30–14	Tampa Mayhem	July 26th - 7:00pm	North Rugby Fields at UNF

2025 USA Rugby League National Championship Game

Home	Score	Away	Match Information
Home	Score	Away	Date and Time (EST)	Venue	Report
Jacksonville Axemen	18–34	Brooklyn Kings RLFC	August 9th - 7:00pm	North Rugby Fields at UNF
