= Derek McVey =

Former Australian rugby league footballer

Personal information
- Full name: Derek McVey
- Born: 20 July 1968 (age 58) Newcastle, New South Wales, Australia

Playing information
- Position: Second-row, Prop
Club
Years	Team	Pld	T	G	FG	P
1990	Gold Coast	1	1	0	0	4
1992–95	Balmain	51	10	0	0	40
1996–97	St. Helens	30	7	1	0	30
	Total	82	18	1	0	74

Coaching information
Club
Years	Team	Gms	W	D	L	W%
2019–24	Southwest Florida Copperheads
2024–	Washington DC Cavalry
	Total	0	0	0	0
- Source: As of 5 November 2024

Derek McVey (born 20 July 1968) is an Australian former professional rugby league footballer who played in the 1990s.

== Background ==
McVey was born in Newcastle, New South Wales, Australia.

== Playing career ==
McVey made his debut for the Gold Coast in Round 18 against Illawarra with McVey scoring a try in a 20–12 defeat. McVey joined Balmain in 1992 making 12 appearances for the club in his first year there. In 1994, McVey played 9 games as Balmain finished last on the table and claimed only their 4th wooden spoon since joining the competition as a foundation team in 1908.

In 1995, Balmain changed their name to the "Sydney Tigers" and moved their home games to Parramatta Stadium at the start of the Super League war. McVey played 20 times for the club in 1995 as they finished 15th on the table.

Mcvey then signed with English side St Helens and played as forward collecting three trophies in the Super League for The Saints.

== Coaching career ==
He is the current coach for the Washington DC Cavalry who compete in the USA Rugby League, having previously coached new club Southwest Florida Copperheads.
