= Ryan Burroughs =

American international rugby league player (born 1991)

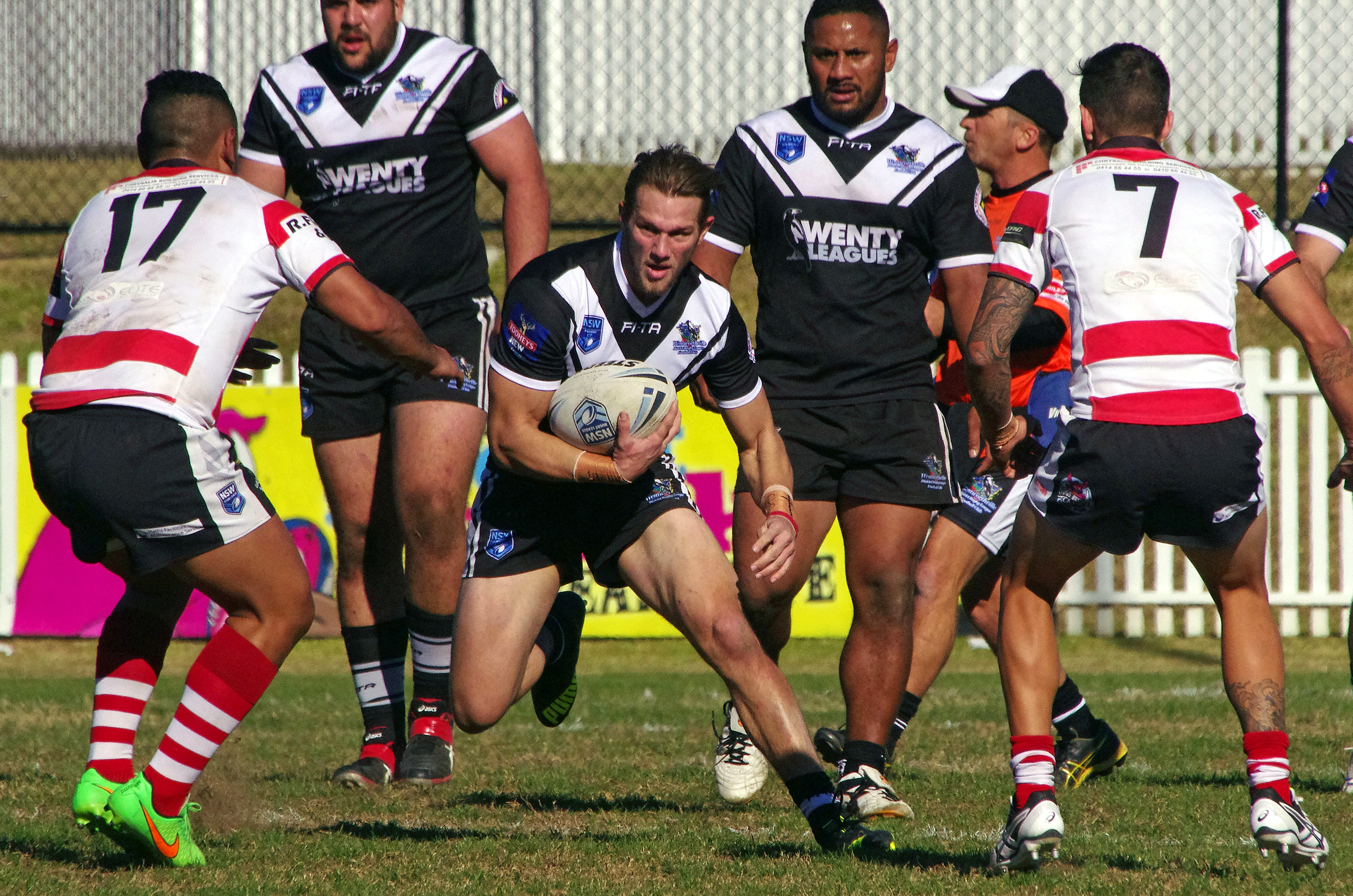
- Burroughs with Wentworthville in 2016

Personal information
- Born: August 26, 1991 (age 35) Manassas, Virginia, U.S.
- Height: 5 ft 10 in (177 cm)
- Weight: 201 lb (91 kg)

Playing information

Rugby league
- Position: Fullback, Wing, Centre
Club
Years	Team	Pld	T	G	FG	P
2015–16	Northern Virginia Eagles	10	33	1	0	134
2016	Wentworthville Magpies	15	17	0	0	68
2017–18	Toronto Wolfpack	11	8	0	0	32
2018(loan)	→ London Skolars	5	4	0	0	16
2018(loan)	→ Barrow Raiders	12	3	0	0	12
2023–	Washington DC Cavalry	7	13	0	0	52
	Total	60	78	1	0	314
Representative
Years	Team	Pld	T	G	FG	P
2015–	United States	20	22	0	0	88
2019–	United States 9s	3	1	1	0	6

Rugby union
- Position: Centre, Wing
Club
Years	Team	Pld	T	G	FG	P
2019–	Old Glory DC	3	2	0	0	10

Coaching information
Club
Years	Team	Gms	W	D	L	W%
2021	Washington DC Cavalry	18	16	0	2	89
- Source: As of September 21, 2021

Ryan Burroughs (born August 26, 1991) is an American rugby football player who has played primarily rugby league he has represented the United States national rugby league team in the 2017 Rugby League World Cup, as well as the 2019 Rugby League World Cup 9's. He last played rugby league for Barrow Raiders. He left the club to sign for rugby union's Major League Rugby side Old Glory DC. Primarily playing on the wing, he can also play as fullback or centre.

== Early life ==
Burroughs played high school football as a running back and wide receiver for Liberty High School in northern Virginia. After serving in the United States Army, he briefly played rugby union for a local club in Virginia, before joining the Northern Virginia Eagles of the USA Rugby League in 2015.

== Senior career ==
Burroughs scored five tries during his rugby league debut match against the Bucks County Sharks. He finished the season with 33 tries from 10 games, and was selected to represent the United States in their two-match Colonial Cup series against Canada later in the year, scoring one try in the first match, and two tries in the second. In December 2015, Burroughs played in both of the US' 2017 World Cup qualifying matches against Jamaica and Canada, scoring a try against Canada.

Burroughs moved to Australia to play for the Wentworthville Magpies in 2016. Initially playing in the Sydney Shield, Burroughs was promoted to the Magpies' Ron Massey Cup team during the season. In October 2016, Burroughs signed with the newly established Toronto Wolfpack for their inaugural season in 2017. He made his debut for the Wolfpack in their 2017 Challenge Cup match against Siddal, scoring the club's first ever competitive try.

In March 2018, Burroughs was sent on loan, along with Wolfpack teammate Quinn Ngawati, to League 1 side London Skolars for the remainder of the 2018 season. Later that year, Burroughs moved to the Barrow Raiders in the Championship.

== DC Cavalry ==
In April 2021 the professional twelve team North American Rugby League (NARL) was launched, with Burroughs being announced as Founder/Owner of Eastern Conference team the D.C. Cavalry (based in Washington, D.C.).

On September 20, 2021 it was reported that Ryan had coached Washington DC Cavalry in the inaugural Canada Cup fixture versus Toronto Wolfpack.
