= 2024 USARL season =

- Structure: Regional Round Robin + Playoffs
- League: USA Rugby League
- Duration: June 1 - August 24, 2024
- Teams: 20 (18 from June)
- Minor premiers: Provo Broncos (1st title)
- Wooden spoon: South Jordan Rabbitahz, Atlanta Rhinos
- Matches played: 63
- Points scored: 4,522 (71.78 points per game)
- Champions: DC Cavalry (1st title)
- Biggest home win: Sacramento Immortals 112 - 0 Los Angeles Mongrel (June 29)
- Biggest away win: East Palo Alto Razorbacks 26 - 136 Santa Rosa Dead Pelicans (July 27)

The 2024 USA Rugby League season was the 27th season overall of amateur and semi-professional rugby league competition in the United States and the 12th season under the governance of the USARL. In April 2024, the USARL announced a new regionalized structure to the national league. The Utah Rugby League Association would now operate as an independent entity distinct from the Pacific Coast Rugby League, managing its competition in accordance with USARL standards. At the end of the season, the Utah League and Pacific Coast winners will play for the Western Championship, with the winner facing the Eastern Champions for the National Championship.

The East Coast of the United States sees the return of Boston 13s, Brooklyn Kings RLFC, and Delaware Black Foxes with Washington DC Cavalry joining as the Rugby League United competition becomes the Northeastern conference of USARL.

USARL South would now become the Florida Rugby League, the rebranding affects both men's and women's teams in the region, including the Jacksonville Axemen and Axewomen, Southwest FL Copperheads, Tampa Mayhem and Mischief, and the Atlanta Rhinos.

== League notes ==
=== Western Conference ===
==== Utah Rugby League ====
The South Jordan Rabbitahz officially join the 2024 Hopoate Cup.

Glendale Storm pull out for the 2024 season but plan to return in 2025.

Pacific Coast Rugby League

Former USA Rugby Union champions and Championship Rugby League winners East Palo Alto Razorbacks join the Pacific Coast Rugby League.

West Los Angeles Jackrabbits pull out for the 2024 season but plan to return in 2025 and have maintained their affiliate membership of the league.

=== Eastern Conference ===
Rugby League United become the Northeastern division of USARL as Northeast Rugby League, Boston 13s, Brooklyn Kings RLFC, and Delaware Black Foxes return to the USARL and Washington DC Cavalry are a new admission to the league.

USARL South rebrand as Florida Rugby League.

Boston Thirteens and North Sydney Bears form a partnership to enter a team under the Boston Bears name and to provide player exchange opportunities.

== Format ==
Due to expansion of the competition, the Championship will be structured into four regional leagues across an Eastern and Western Conference.

The Northeast Rugby League will consist of six regular season games per team in 8 weeks, afterwards the top two teams will playoff for the Northeast RL regional championship. The Florida Rugby League will consist of six regular season games per team in 7 weeks, with the top two to playoff for the Florida RL regional championship. The winner of each regional final will advance to the Eastern Conference Final.

In the West, Pacific Coast Rugby League, each team will play the teams in their region both home and away, and will play the 3 other teams once - one home, one away, and one at a neutral venue. The team at the top of the table at the end of the regular season is crowned PCRL champion and will advance to the Western Conference Final.

Utah Rugby League will consist of six regular season games per team in 8 weeks, afterwards the top two teams will playoff for the Hopoate Cup championship. The winner of each regional final will advance to the Western Conference Final.

The winners of the Eastern and Western Conference will meet in California for the National Championship on August 24. The venue of the final will be determined at a later date.

== Participating clubs ==
=== Eastern Conference ===
Northeast Rugby League
| Colors | Club | Founded | City (MSA) | Stadium | National Titles (Last) |
| | Boston Bears | 2014 | Boston | Eastern Boston Stadium | 1 (2015) |
| | Brooklyn Kings RLFC | 2006 | Brooklyn | Randalls Island Field 10 | 1 (2019) |
| | DC Cavalry | 2021 | Washington Metro | Central Sports Complex | 0 (N/A) |
| | Delaware Black Foxes | 2018 | Wilmington, Delaware | Eden Park | 0 (N/A) |

Florida Rugby League
| Colors | Club | Founded | City (MSA) | Stadium | National Titles (Last) |
| | Atlanta Rhinos | 2014 | Roswell, GA | Marietta High School | 1 (2017) |
| | Jacksonville Axemen | 2006 | Jacksonville, FL | North Rugby Fields at UNF | 3 (2022) |
| | Southwest Florida Copperheads | 2018 | Naples, FL | Paradise Coast Sports Complex | 0 (N/A) |
| | Tampa Mayhem | 2014 | Tampa, FL | Hillsborough High School | 1 (2021) |

=== Western Conference ===
Pacific Coast Rugby League
| Colors | Club | Founded | City (MSA) | Stadium | National Titles (Last) |
| | East Palo Alto Razorbacks | 2021 | East Palo Alto, California | Rich May Field | 0 |
| | Los Angeles Mongrel | 2019 | Los Angeles, California | Various | 0 |
| | Los Angeles Bandidos | 2022 | Los Angeles, California | Chittick Field | 0 |
| | Sacramento Immortals | 2020 | Sacramento, California | Danny Nunn Park | 0 |
| | San Diego Barracudas | 2020 | San Diego, California | Torrey Pines High School | 0 |
| | Santa Rosa Dead Pelicans | 2018 | Santa Rosa, California | For Pete's Sake Field | 1 (2023) |
| | West Los Angeles Jackrabbits* | 2024 | Los Angeles, California | TBA | 0 |

- West Los Angeles Jackrabbits pulled out for the 2024 season, plans to return in 2025.

Utah Rugby League
| Colors | Club | Founded | City (MSA) | Stadium | National Titles (Last) |
| | Herriman Roosters | 2022 | Herriman, Utah | Burgess Park | 0 |
| | Riverton Seagulls | 2022 | Riverton, Utah | Burgess Park | 0 |
| | Provo Broncos | 2022 | Provo, Utah | Burgess Park | 0 |
| | South Jordan Rabbitahz | 2024 | South Jordan, Utah | South Jordan Park Burgess Park | 0 |
| | Glendale Storm* | 2022 | Glendale, Utah | Burgess Park | 0 |

- Glendale Storm pulled out for the 2024 season, plans to return in 2025.

== 2024 Season Standings ==
A win is worth 2 points, a draw worth 1 point, and a loss worth 0 points. There are no bonus points for number of tries or close losses. Updated as of August 4, 2024, 5:03 pm (MST).

Legend
Advance to Regional Playoffs
Regional Champion

Western Conference Standings^{1}
| # | Team | P | W | T | L | PF | PA | PD | Pts |
| 1 | Provo Broncos | 7 | 7 | 0 | 0 | 364 | 124 | + 240 | 14 |
| 2 | Los Angeles Bandidos | 7 | 6 | 1 | 0 | 448 | 50 | + 398 | 13 |
| 3 | Santa Rosa Dead Pelicans | 7 | 6 | 1 | 0 | 464 | 170 | + 294 | 13 |
| 4 | Riverton Seagulls | 7 | 4 | 0 | 3 | 280 | 242 | + 38 | 8 |
| 5 | Sacramento Immortals | 7 | 3 | 0 | 4 | 258 | 164 | + 94 | 6 |
| 6 | East Palo Alto Razorbacks | 7 | 3 | 0 | 4 | 234 | 302 | 68 | 6 |
| 7 | Herriman Roosters | 7 | 3 | 0 | 4 | 264 | 252 | + 12 | 4 |
| 8 | Los Angeles Mongrel | 7 | 1 | 1 | 5 | 106 | 474 | 368 | 3 |
| 9 | San Diego Barracudas | 7 | 0 | 1 | 6 | 132 | 482 | 350 | 1 |
| 10 | South Jordan Rabbitahz | 7 | 0 | 0 | 7 | 116 | 426 | 310 | 0 |

^{1} - 7th PCRL game and URLA qualifiers

Pacific Coast Rugby League Standings
| # | Team | P | W | T | L | PF | PA | PD | Pts |
| 1 | Los Angeles Bandidos | 7 | 6 | 1 | 0 | 448 | 50 | + 398 | 13 |
| 2 | Santa Rosa Dead Pelicans | 7 | 6 | 1 | 0 | 464 | 170 | + 294 | 13 |
| 3 | Sacramento Immortals | 7 | 3 | 0 | 4 | 258 | 164 | + 94 | 6 |
| 4 | East Palo Alto Razorbacks | 7 | 3 | 0 | 4 | 234 | 302 | 68 | 4 |
| 5 | Los Angeles Mongrel | 7 | 1 | 1 | 5 | 106 | 474 | 368 | 3 |
| 6 | San Diego Barracudas | 7 | 0 | 1 | 6 | 132 | 482 | 350 | 1 |

Utah Rugby League Standings
| # | Team | P | W | T | L | PF | PA | PD | Pts |
| 1 | Provo Broncos | 6 | 6 | 0 | 0 | 364 | 124 | + 240 | 12 |
| 2 | Riverton Seagulls | 6 | 4 | 0 | 2 | 266 | 208 | + 58 | 8 |
| 3 | Herriman Roosters | 6 | 2 | 0 | 4 | 264 | 252 | + 12 | 4 |
| 4 | South Jordan Rabbitahz | 6 | 0 | 0 | 6 | 116 | 426 | 310 | 0 |

Eastern Conference Standings
| # | Team | P | W | T | L | PF | PA | PD | Pts |
| 1 | DC Cavalry | 6 | 5 | 0 | 1 | 234 | 70 | + 164 | 10 |
| 2 | Southwest Florida Copperheads | 6 | 5 | 0 | 1 | 244 | 82 | + 162 | 10 |
| 3 | Brooklyn Kings RLFC | 6 | 5 | 0 | 1 | 244 | 134 | + 110 | 10 |
| 4 | Jacksonville Axemen | 6 | 5 | 0 | 1 | 220 | 114 | + 106 | 10 |
| 5 | Delaware Black Foxes | 6 | 2 | 0 | 4 | 172 | 190 | 18 | 4 |
| 6 | Tampa Mayhem | 6 | 2 | 0 | 4 | 195 | 196 | 1 | 4 |
| 7 | Boston Bears | 6 | 0 | 0 | 6 | 70 | 342 | 272 | 0 |
| 8 | Atlanta Rhinos | 6 | 0 | 0 | 6 | 42 | 319 | 277 | 0 |

Florida Rugby League Standings
| # | Team | P | W | T | L | PF | PA | PD | Pts |
| 1 | Southwest Florida Copperheads | 6 | 5 | 0 | 1 | 244 | 82 | + 162 | 10 |
| 2 | Jacksonville Axemen | 6 | 5 | 0 | 1 | 220 | 114 | + 106 | 10 |
| 3 | Tampa Mayhem | 6 | 2 | 0 | 4 | 195 | 196 | 1 | 4 |
| 4 | Atlanta Rhinos | 6 | 0 | 0 | 6 | 42 | 319 | 277 | 0 |

Northeast Rugby League Standings
| # | Team | P | W | T | L | PF | PA | PD | Pts |
| 1 | DC Cavalry | 6 | 5 | 0 | 1 | 234 | 70 | + 164 | 10 |
| 2 | Brooklyn Kings | 6 | 5 | 0 | 1 | 244 | 134 | + 110 | 10 |
| 3 | Delaware Black Foxes | 6 | 2 | 0 | 4 | 172 | 190 | 18 | 4 |
| 4 | Boston Bears | 6 | 0 | 0 | 6 | 70 | 342 | 272 | 0 |

== Results ==
=== Round 1 ===
==== Florida Rugby League ====
| Home | Score | Away | Match Information |
|---|---|---|---|---|---|
| Home | Score | Away | Date and Time (EST) | Venue | Report |
| Tampa Mayhem | 30 - 34 | Jacksonville Axemen | June 1, 6:00 pm | Hillsborough High School |
| Atlanta Rhinos | 10 - 58 | Southwest Florida Copperheads | June 1, 7:00 pm | Marietta High School |

==== Pacific Coast: Magic Weekend in Santa Maria ====
| Home | Score | Away | Match Information |
|---|---|---|---|---|---|
| Home | Score | Away | Date and Time (PST) | Venue | Report |
| Sacramento Immortals | 56 - 12 | San Diego Barracudas | June 1, 10:00 PM | Pioneer Valley High School |
| Santa Rosa Dead Pelicans | 70 - 22 | Los Angeles Mongrel | June 1, 12:00 PM | Pioneer Valley High School |
| Los Angeles Bandidos | 40 - 0 | East Palo Alto Razorbacks | June 1, 2:00 PM | Pioneer Valley High School |

==== Utah Rugby League ====
| Home | Score | Away | Match Information |
|---|---|---|---|---|---|
| Home | Score | Away | Date and Time (MST) | Venue | Report |
| Riverton Seagulls | 68 - 22 | South Jordan Rabbitahz | June 1, 6:30 PM | Burgess Park |

=== Round 2 ===
==== Pacific Coast Rugby League ====
| Home | Score | Away | Match Information |
|---|---|---|---|---|---|
| Home | Score | Away | Date and Time (PST) | Venue | Report |
| Santa Rosa Dead Pelicans | 62 - 26 | East Palo Alto Razorbacks | June 8, 10:00 AM | For Pete's Sake Field |
| Los Angeles Bandidos | 104 - 0 | Los Angeles Mongrel | June 8, 1:00 PM | Chittick Field |

==== Utah Rugby League: Alpine Double-Header ====
| Home | Score | Away | Match Information |
|---|---|---|---|---|---|
| Home | Score | Away | Date and Time (PST) | Venue | Report |
| Provo Broncos | 78 - 6 | South Jordan Rabbitahz | June 8, 4:45 PM | Burgess Park |
| Herriman Roosters | 36 - 48 | Riverton Seagulls | June 8, 7:00 PM | Burgess Park |

==== Florida Rugby League ====
| Home | Score | Away | Match Information |
|---|---|---|---|---|---|
| Home | Score | Away | Date and Time (EST) | Venue | Report |
| Tampa Mayhem | 22 - 52 | Southwest Florida Copperheads | June 8, 5:30 PM | Hillsborough High School |
| Atlanta Rhinos | 28 - 38 | Jacksonville Axemen | June 8, 7:00 PM | Marietta High School |

=== Round 3 ===
==== Northeast Rugby League ====
| Home | Score | Away | Match Information |
|---|---|---|---|---|---|
| Home | Score | Away | Date and Time (EST) | Venue | Report |
| Delaware Black Foxes | 10 - 48 | DC Cavalry | June 15, 4:00 PM | Eden Park |
| Brooklyn Kings | 94 - 0 | Boston Bears | June 15, 6:00 PM | Randalls Island Field 10 |

==== Florida Rugby League ====
| Home | Score | Away | Match Information |
|---|---|---|---|---|---|
| Home | Score | Away | Date and Time (EST) | Venue | Report |
| Jacksonville Axemen | 40 - 18 | Tampa Mayhem | June 15, 6:30 PM | North Rugby Fields at UNF |
| Southwest Florida Copperheads | 40 - 0 | Atlanta Rhinos | June 15, 5:00 PM | Paradise Coast Sports Complex |

==== Pacific Coast Rugby League ====
| Home | Score | Away | Match Information |
|---|---|---|---|---|---|
| Home | Score | Away | Date and Time (PST) | Venue | Report |
| Sacramento Immortals | 22 - 32 | Santa Rosa Dead Pelicans | June 15, 10:00 AM | Danny Nunn Park |
| San Diego Barracudas | 34 - 34 | Los Angeles Mongrel | June 15, 3:00 PM | Torrey Pines High School |

==== Utah Rugby League ====
| Home | Score | Away | Match Information |
|---|---|---|---|---|---|
| Home | Score | Away | Date and Time (MST) | Venue | Report |
| South Jordan Rabbitahz | 26 - 76 | Herriman Roosters | June 15, 4:45 PM | Burgess Park |
| Provo Broncos | 50 - 16 | Riverton Seagulls | June 15, 7:00 PM | Burgess Park |

=== Round 4 ===
==== Utah Rugby League ====
| Home | Score | Away | Match Information |
|---|---|---|---|---|---|
| Home | Score | Away | Date and Time (MST) | Venue | Report |
| South Jordan Rabbitahz | 20 - 72 | Provo Broncos | June 22, 4:45 PM | Burgess Park |
| Herriman Roosters | 30 - 42 | Riverton Seagulls | June 22, 7:00 PM | Burgess Park |

==== Pacific Coast Rugby League ====
| Home | Score | Away | Match Information |
|---|---|---|---|---|---|
| Home | Score | Away | Date and Time (PST) | Venue | Report |
| Sacramento Immortals | 40 - 0 | East Palo Alto Razorbacks | June 22, 10:00 AM | Kelly Park |
| Los Angeles Bandidos | 56 - 6 | San Diego Barracudas | June 22, 1:30 PM | Chittick Field |

==== Northeast Rugby League ====
| Home | Score | Away | Match Information |
|---|---|---|---|---|---|
| Home | Score | Away | Date and Time (EST) | Venue | Report |
| DC Cavalry | 66 - 20 | Brooklyn Kings | June 22, 12:45 PM | Central Sports Complex |
| Boston Bears | 14 - 50 | Delaware Black Foxes | June 22, 3:30 PM | Lasell University |

==== Florida Rugby League ====
| Home | Score | Away | Match Information |
|---|---|---|---|---|---|
| Home | Score | Away | Date and Time (PST) | Venue | Report |
| Tampa Mayhem | 53 - 4 | Atlanta Rhinos | June 22, 5:30 PM | Hillsborough High School |
| Jacksonville Axemen | 14 - 32 | Southwest Florida Copperheads | June 22, 7:00 PM | North Rugby Fields at UNF |

=== Round 5 ===
==== Florida Rugby League ====
| Home | Score | Away | Match Information |
|---|---|---|---|---|---|
| Home | Score | Away | Date and Time (EST) | Venue | Report |
| Jacksonville Axemen | 102 - 0 | Atlanta Rhinos | June 29, 7:00 PM | North Rugby Fields at UNF |

==== Northeast Rugby League ====
| Home | Score | Away | Match Information |
|---|---|---|---|---|---|
| Home | Score | Away | Date and Time (EST) | Venue | Report |
| Brooklyn Kings | 32 - 20 | Delaware Black Foxes | June 29, 11:00 AM | Bushwick Inlet Park |
| Boston Bears | 8 - 62 | DC Cavalry | June 29, 3:30 PM | Pine Banks Park |

==== Pacific Coast Rugby League ====
| Home | Score | Away | Match Information |
|---|---|---|---|---|---|
| Home | Score | Away | Date and Time (PST) | Venue | Report |
| Santa Rosa Dead Pelicans | 32 - 32 | Los Angeles Bandidos | June 29, 1:00 PM | For Pete's Sake Field |
| Sacramento Immortals | 112 - 0 | Los Angeles Mongrel | June 29, 1:00 PM | Danny Nunn Park |
| East Palo Alto Razorbacks | 102 - 24 | San Diego Barracudas | June 29, 6:00 PM | Kelly Park |

==== Utah Rugby League ====
| Home | Score | Away | Match Information |
|---|---|---|---|---|---|
| Home | Score | Away | Date and Time (MST) | Venue | Report |
| South Jordan Rabbitahz | 23 - 66 | Riverton Seagulls | June 29, 4:45 PM | Burgess Park |
| Provo Broncos | 52 - 40 | Herriman Roosters | June 29, 7:00 PM | Burgess Park |

=== Round 6 ===
==== Northeast Rugby League ====
| Home | Score | Away | Match Information |
|---|---|---|---|---|---|
| Home | Score | Away | Date and Time (EST) | Venue | Report |
| Brooklyn Kings | 22 - 14 | DC Cavalry | July 13, 11:00 AM | Bushwick Inlet Park | Full Match: |
| Delaware Black Foxes | 60 - 4 | Boston Bears | July 13, 5:00 PM | Eden Park |

==== Florida Rugby League ====
| Home | Score | Away | Match Information |
|---|---|---|---|---|---|
| Home | Score | Away | Date and Time (EST) | Venue | Report |
| Tampa Mayhem | 4 - 38 | Southwest Florida Copperheads | July 13, 7:00 PM | Hillsborough High School |

==== Pacific Coast Rugby League ====
| Home | Score | Away | Match Information |
|---|---|---|---|---|---|
| Home | Score | Away | Date and Time (PST) | Venue | Report |
| Santa Rosa Dead Pelicans | 40 - 28 | Sacramento Immortals | July 13, 11:00 AM | For Pete's Sake Field |
| San Diego Barracudas | 6 - 100 | Los Angeles Bandidos | July 13, 4:00 PM | Torrey Pines High School |

==== Utah Rugby League ====
| Home | Score | Away | Match Information |
|---|---|---|---|---|---|
| Home | Score | Away | Date and Time (MST) | Venue | Report |
| Provo Broncos | 62 - 16 | Herriman Roosters | July 13, 7:00 PM | Burgess Park |

=== Round 7 ===
==== Pacific Coast Rugby League ====
| Home | Score | Away | Match Information |
|---|---|---|---|---|---|
| Home | Score | Away | Date and Time (PST) | Venue | Report |
| Los Angeles Bandidos | 76 - 6 | Los Angeles Mongrel | July 20, 1:30 PM | Chittick Field |
| Sacramento Immortals | 0 - 40 | East Palo Alto Razorbacks | July 20, 11:00 AM | Danny Nunn Park |

==== Northeast Rugby League ====
| Home | Score | Away | Match Information |
|---|---|---|---|---|---|
| Home | Score | Away | Date and Time (EST) | Venue | Report |
| DC Cavalry | 44 - 10 | Delaware Black Foxes | July 20, 12:45 PM | Central Sports Complex |
| Boston Bears | 12 - 28 | Brooklyn Kings | July 20, 3:30 PM | Lasell University |

==== Florida Rugby League ====
| Home | Score | Away | Match Information |
|---|---|---|---|---|---|
| Home | Score | Away | Date and Time (EST) | Venue | Report |
| Atlanta Rhinos | 0 - 68 | Tampa Mayhem | July 20, 6:00 PM | Northcutt Stadium |
| Southwest Florida Copperheads | 24 - 32 | Jacksonville Axemen | July 20, 6:45 PM | Paradise Coast Sports Complex |

=== Round 8 (Florida Regional Final & Utah Rugby League Semifinals) ===
==== Northeast Rugby League ====
| Home | Score | Away | Match Information |
|---|---|---|---|---|---|
| Home | Score | Away | Date and Time (EST) | Venue | Report |
| DC Cavalry | 40 - 28 | Boston Bears | July 27, 12:45 PM | Central Sports Complex |
| Delaware Black Foxes | 22 - 48 | Brooklyn Kings | July 27, 5:00 PM | Eden Park |

==== Pacific Coast Rugby League ====
| Home | Score | Away | Match Information |
|---|---|---|---|---|---|
| Home | Score | Away | Date and Time (PST) | Venue | Report |
| East Palo Alto Razorbacks | 26 - 136 | Santa Rosa Dead Pelicans | July 27, 9:00 AM | Kelly Park |
| Sacramento Immortals | 0 - 40 | Los Angeles Bandidos | July 27, 11:00 AM | Danny Nunn Park |
| San Diego Barracudas | 36 - 44 | Los Angeles Mongrel | July 27, 5:00 PM | Calabasas High School |

==== Utah Rugby League Semi Finals ====
| Home | Score | Away | Match Information |
|---|---|---|---|---|---|
| Home | Score | Away | Date and Time (MST) | Venue | Report |
| Riverton Seagulls | 44 - 38 | Herriman Roosters | July 27, 4:45 PM | Burgess Park |
| Provo Broncos | 66 - 10 | South Jordan Rabbitahz | July 27, 7:00 PM | Burgess Park |

==== Florida Rugby League Final ====
| Home | Score | Away | Match Information |
|---|---|---|---|---|---|
| Home | Score | Away | Date and Time (EST) | Venue | Report |
| Southwest Florida Copperheads | 30 - 18 | Jacksonville Axemen | July 27, 7:30 PM | Paradise Coast Sports Complex |

=== Round 9 (Northeast and Utah Regional Finals) ===
==== Northeast Rugby League Final ====
| Home | Score | Away | Match Information |
|---|---|---|---|---|---|
| Home | Score | Away | Date and Time (EST) | Venue | Report |
| DC Cavalry | 28 - 22 | Brooklyn Kings | August 3, 4:30 PM | Central Sports Complex |

==== Utah Rugby League Final ====
| Home | Score | Away | Match Information |
| Home | Score | Away | Date and Time (MST) | Venue | Report |
|---|---|---|---|---|---|
| Provo Broncos | 34 - 14 | Riverton Seagulls | August 3, 6:45 PM | Utah Valley University |

===== Pacific Coast Rugby League =====
| Home | Score | Away | Match Information |
|---|---|---|---|---|---|
| Home | Score | Away | Date and Time (PST) | Venue | Report |
| San Diego Barracudas | 14 - 90 | Santa Rosa Dead Pelicans | August 3, 4:00 PM | Torrey Pines High School |
| Los Angeles Mongrel | 0 - 40 | East Palo Alto Razorbacks | August 3, 4:00 PM | Van Nuys |

== National Playoffs ==
=== Conference Championships ===
| Home | Score | Away | Match Information |
| Home | Score | Away | Date and Time (PST/EST) | Venue | Report |
|---|---|---|---|---|---|
| DC Cavalry | *64 - 50 | Southwest Florida Copperheads | August 10, 2:15 PM (EST) | Abessinio Stadium |
| Provo Broncos | 56 - 32 | Los Angeles Bandidos | August 10, 5:00 PM (PST) | Utah Valley University |

(*) - After Extra Time. Score at FT: 44 - 44

=== National Championship ===
| Western Champion | Score | Eastern Champion | Match Information |
| Western Champion | Score | Eastern Champion | Date and Time (PST/EST) | Venue | Report |
|---|---|---|---|---|---|
| Provo Broncos | 0 - 30^{F} | DC Cavalry | August 24, 6:00 PM | Utah Valley University |
