= Sacramento Immortals =

Rugby League Football Club in Sacramento, CA

Club information
- Full name: Sacramento Immortals Rugby League Football Club
- Nickname: Immortals
- Founded: 2019; 7 years ago

Current details
- Ground: Danny Nunn Park
- Competition: USA Rugby League
- 2026: 2nd, West Coast Conference

The Sacramento Immortals currently play in the West Coast Conference, Northern California division of the USA Rugby League.

== History ==
The club was formed in 2019 by Fijian, Skipper Niulevu. They won the Las Vegas 9s in 2024.

== Current squad ==
Squad for the 2026 USARL season.

- 1.AB Faaliga (Fullback)
- 2.Malai Sese Tuifagalele (Wing)
- 3.Pita Naruma (Centre)
- 4.Suliasi Naruma (Centre)
- 5.Andre Whaley (Wing)
- 6.Kemueli Tawake (Five-eighth)
- 7.Mason Mcrory (Halfback)
- 8.Samuel Waqa Biutu (Prop)
- 9.JR Faaliga (Hooker)
- 10.Benjamin Biutu (Prop)
- 11.Gerardo Dominiko (Second-row)
- 12.Mark Rokotovitovi (Second-row)
- 13.Adrea Tuilomaloma (Lock)
- 14.Cedric Lui Niulevu
- 15.Tevita Vaka (Prop)
- 16.Eremasi Niulevu
- 17.Epineri Feoko
- 18.Dominic Salvatierra
- 19.Josh Baravilala
- 20.Robert Vaughn (Second-row)
