= Delaware Black Foxes =

Rugby League Football Club in Wilmington, DE

Club information
- Full name: Delaware Black Foxes Rugby League Football Club
- Nickname: Black Foxes
- Colours: Black and orange
- Founded: 2015; 11 years ago
- Website: https://blackfoxesrugby.com/

Current details
- Ground: Eden Park
- CEO: Bjorn Haglid
- Coach: Liam Mulhall
- Captain: Ian Ferguson
- Competition: USA Rugby League
- 2026: 3rd, East Coast Conference (Northeast division)

Records
- Runners-up: 1 (2021)

The Delaware Black Foxes is a rugby league team based in Wilmington, Delaware. They currently play in the Northeast Conference of the USA Rugby League.

== History ==
The Delaware Black Foxes were first established in 2014 and began play in the 2015 USARL season. In 2021, the Black Foxes reached their first USARL Grand Final, losing to the Tampa Mayhem 60-10.

The Black Foxes were one of several teams to leave the USA Rugby League in 2022 to form Rugby League United (RLU). Ahead of the 2024 USARL season, it was announced that the RLU was rejoining the USARL, forming the Northeast Conference.

== Current squad ==
Squad for the 2026 USARL season.

- 1.Ian Ferguson (Fullback)
- 2.Marcus Brown (Wing)
- 3.Dom Cacesse (Centre)
- 4.Omar Jones (Centre)
- 5.Christian Gwynn (Wing)
- 6.Bailey Russell (Five-eighth)
- 7.Connor Gilden (Halfback)
- 8.AJ Ray (Prop)
- 9.Bailey Robertson (Hooker)
- 10.Tom Saunders (Prop)
- 11.Tony Alessia (Second-row)
- 12.Jason Bartlow (Second-row)
- 13.Pierce Armstrong (Lock)
- 14.Matt Lanning
- 15.Mike Argumedo
- 16.Gabriel Costa
- 17.Adrian Schembri
- 18.Chris DiDonato
- 19.Mike Naughter
- 20.Eddie Tuihalagingie
- 21.Neville Lynch (Second-row)
