= Los Angeles Roosters =

Rugby League Football Club in Los Angeles, CA

Los Angeles Roosters RLFC
Club information
- Full name: Los Angeles Roosters Rugby League Football Club
- Nickname: Roosters
- Founded: 2023; 3 years ago

Current details
- Ground: Warren High School
- Coach: Phil Ayres
- Manager: Emiliano Nash
- Competition: USA Rugby League
- 2026: 1st (West Coast Conference), 2nd (Runners Up) USARL Grand Final (Championship Final)

Records
- Champions: 2025, 2026 (Las Vegas 9s Womens Champions)

The Los Angeles Roosters (formerly Bandidos) are a Rugby league team based in Los Angeles, California. The club competes in the Western Conference's, Southern California Division of the USA Rugby League and have played in the Las Vegas Rugby League 9s.

== History ==
The club was first founded in 2023 as the Bandidos by Los Angeles local, Emiliano Nash. It was announced in June 2024 that the Australian professional rugby league club, the Sydney Roosters who competes in the National Rugby League (NRL) would invest in establishing a West Coast Rugby League Academy, and also fund other local American rugby league developments, after being one of the first teams NRL teams to play in America.

== Current squad ==
Squad for the 2026 USARL season.

- 1.Shingirai Hlanguyo (Fullback)
- 2.Brandon Millan (Wing)
- 3.Esteban Tupuola (Centre)
- 4.Solomone Ahoia (Centre)
- 5.Darius King (Wing)
- 6.Ethan Povey (Five-eighth)
- 7.Matt Walsh (Halfback)
- 8.Daniel Vaafuti (Prop)
- 9.Emiliano Nash (Hooker)
- 10.Ephraim Teo (Prop)
- 11.Sohl Gafa (Second-row)
- 12.Sione Masoe (Second-row)
- 13.Tyler Sisley (Lock)
- 14.Damyen Davis (Prop)
- 15.Robert Newcomb (Second-row)
- 16.Keanu Asuega (Centre)
- 17.Armando Polanco (Prop)
- 18.Evile Matautia
- 19.Jeffrey Sen
- 20.Joseph Patolo
- 21.Josh Brandon
- 22.Melvin Aleki
- 23.Michael Willis
- 24.Nele Sinclair
- 25.Samuel Stewart-Anderson
- 26.Sean Johnson-Rachal
- 27.Tyler Fraas
- 28.Afioga Afioga

== Notable players ==
- Women:
- Jessica Sergis
- Millie Elliott
- Corban Baxter
- Rima Butler
- Brydie Parker
- Jasmin Strange

(All appeared in the Las Vegas 9s).

== Honors ==
- Las Vegas 9s Women's Champions (2): (2025,2026)

== See also ==
- Sports in Los Angeles
