= San Diego Barracudas (rugby league) =

Rugby League Football Club in San Diego, CA

Club information
- Full name: San Diego Barracudas Rugby League Football Club
- Nickname: Barracudas
- Founded: 2021; 5 years ago

Current details
- Ground: Torrey Pines High School
- Competition: USA Rugby League
- 2026: 4th, West Coast Conference

The San Diego Barracudas currently play in the West Coast Conference, Southern California division of the USA Rugby League.

== History ==
The Barracudas are the first ever rugby league team in San Diego. They played their inaugural game in 2021, a 34–4 loss to the Los Angeles Mongrel.

== Current squad ==
Squad for the 2026 USARL season.

- 1.Darrin Roldan (Fullback)
- 2.Xavier Goy (Wing)
- 3.Devlin Cleveland (Centre)
- 4.TJ Jimenez (Centre)
- 5.Conor Bready (Wing)
- 6.Alex Monos (Five-eighth)
- 7.Jeff King (Halfback)
- 8.Hayden Kaas (Prop)
- 9.Cooper Fields (Hooker)
- 10.Phoenix Pedrami (Prop)
- 11.Aeryk Young (Second-row)
- 12.Ulolo Samoata (Second-row)
- 13.JR Tanielu (Lock)
- 14.Michael Ridgeway
- 15.Angelo Padilla

== Notable players ==
Men's

- Kevin Locke (played in the Las Vegas 9s)

Women's

- Botille Vette-Welsh (played in the Las Vegas 9s)
- Emily Veivers (played in the Las Vegas 9s)
