= Santa Rosa Dead Pelicans =

Rugby League football club in Santa Rosa, California

Club information
- Full name: Santa Rosa Dead Pelicans Rugby League Football Club
- Nickname: Dead Pelicans
- Founded: 2021; 5 years ago

Current details
- Ground: For Pete's Sake Rugby Ground
- Competition: USA Rugby League
- 2026: 3rd, Western Conference

The Santa Rosa Dead Pelicans currently play in the West Coast Conference, Northern California division of the USA Rugby League. They won their first USARL Grand Final (National Championship) in 2023 against the Jacksonville Axemen 20–16.
