= Chittick Field =

Sports complex in Long Beach, California

- Interactive map of Chittick Field
- Former names: Hamilton Bowl
- Address: 1900 Walnut Avenue; Long Beach, California
- Coordinates: 33.7921°N 118.1719°W
- Acreage: 19 acres

Construction
- Groundbreaking: 1936
- Built: 1950
- Years active: from 1950

Website
- https://www.longbeach.gov/Park/Park-and-Facilities/Directory/Chittick-Field/

Chittick Field is a sports complex in Long Beach, California. Originally constructed (and still used) as a stormwater detention basin named Hamilton Bowl (after Hamilton Junior High School, which was located nearby), it is also known under multiple other names: Dee Andrews Sports Complex, "The Hole", "El Hoyo", and as a result of its deterioration in the 2000s, "The Dust Bowl". The complex includes a football field, an all-weather running track, and three lighted soccer fields.

Located along Walnut Avenue, to the north of Pacific Coast Highway, the basin was built in 1936 to capture stormwater runoff from the Signal Hill area, as well as oil from an occasional oil gusher from one of the oil wells that dotted the neighborhood at the time. The basin still slows the peak flow of water downstream to the Los Angeles River during major storms; restoration of submerged playing fields after such occurrences takes about 90 days. The bowl overflowed during the 1939 California tropical storm.

The baseball diamonds were originally built in the detention basin in 1950, with major expansions that included a soccer field and parking in the 1960s and the 1970s. Hamilton Bowl was renamed in 1983 in honor of Brian Chittick, a creator of the Kid Baseball Association, and in 2021 was again renamed to Dee Andrews Sports Complex at Chittick Field after a former city council member.

== Sources ==
- Anaya-Morga, Laura (January 5, 2023). "After the rain, a flooded Chittick Field reminds us of its purpose and its history". Long Beach Post.
- Davis, K. (2006). Signal Hill. Images of America. Arcadia Pub. ISBN 978-0-7385-3073-4.
- Gritchen, Jeff (February 9, 2014). "Beachside homes survived 1939 hurricane". Orange County Register.
- Parks, Recreation and Marine. "Chittick Field Dee Andrews Sports Complex". www.longbeach.gov. City of Long Beach.
