= 2018 USARL season =

21st season of the semi-professional rugby league

2018 USARL Season
- League: USA Rugby League
- Duration: 2 June – 25 August
- Teams: 11
- Highest attendance: 1,015 - Grand Final 08/25/2018 Jacksonville Axemen v Brooklyn Kings RLFC
- Average attendance: ~50-200

2018 season
- Champions: Jacksonville Axemen

The 2018 USA Rugby League season is the 21st season overall of semi-professional rugby league competition in the United States and the 8th season under the governance of the USARL. The season began on Saturday 2 June, and concluded with the Championship Final on Saturday 25 August.

The Jacksonville Axemen won their third national title.

== Standings ==
Northern Conference
Pos	Team	GP	W	L	D	F	A	+/-	Pts
1	Brooklyn Kings RLFC	7	7	0	0	308	108	+200	14
2	White Plains Wombats	7	5	2	0	266	162	+104	12
3	Philadelphia Fight	7	4	3	0	206	123	+83	8
4	New York Knights	7	4	3	0	219	188	+31	8
5	Boston 13s	7	1	5	1	170	270	-100	3
6	Northern Virginia Eagles	7	1	5	1	106	204	-98	3
7	Delaware Black Foxes	7	1	6	0	146	324	-178	2

Southern Conference
Pos	Team	GP	W	L	D	F	A	+/-	Pts
1	Jacksonville Axemen	7	7	0	0	430	108	+322	14
2	Atlanta Rhinos	7	4	3	0	322	160	+162	8
3	Tampa Mayhem	7	3	4	0	200	236	-36	6
4	Southwest Florida Copperheads	7	0	7	0	74	464	-390	0

== Results ==
=== Round 1 ===
Home	Score	Away	Match information
Home	Score	Away	Date and time	Venue
Tampa Mayhem	24 - 38	Jacksonville Axemen	Saturday 2 June	Tampa Catholic High School
Philadelphia Fight	32 - 24	White Plains Wombats	Saturday 2 June	Garthwaite Stadium
Delaware Black Foxes	70 - 6	Northern Virginia Eagles	Saturday 2 June	Eden Park Stadium
Brooklyn Kings RLFC	34 - 14	New York Knights	Sunday 3 June	Bushwick Inlet Park

=== Round 2 ===
Home	Score	Away	Match information
Home	Score	Away	Date and time	Venue
Northern Virginia Eagles	20 - 46	Brooklyn Kings RLFC	Saturday 9 June	Grizzly Sports Complex
Delaware Black Foxes	16 - 40	Philadelphia Fight	Saturday 9 June	Eden Park Stadium
White Plains Wombats	36 - 30	Boston 13s	Saturday 9 June	White Plains High School
Southwest Florida Copperheads	6 - 58	Atlanta Rhinos	Saturday 9 June	Lehigh Senior High School

=== Round 3 ===
Home	Score	Away	Match information
Home	Score	Away	Date and time	Venue
Atlanta Rhinos	36-52	Jacksonville Axemen	Saturday 16 June	Atlanta Silverbacks Park
Southwest Florida Copperheads	22-52	Tampa Mayhem	Saturday 16 June	Lehigh Senior High School
White Plains Wombats	30-0	Northern Virginia Eagles	Saturday 16 June	White Plains High School
New York Knights	50-16	Boston 13s	Saturday 16 June	Pier 40
Brooklyn Kings RLFC	76-0	Delaware Black Foxes	Sunday 17 June	Bushwick Inlet Park

=== Round 4 ===
Home	Score	Away	Match information
Home	Score	Away	Date and time	Venue
Boston 13s	30-46	Brooklyn Kings RLFC	Saturday 23 June	Eastern Boston Stadium
Northern Virginia Eagles	6-32	Philadelphia Fight	Saturday 23 June	TBA
New York Knights	54-6	Delaware Black Foxes	Saturday 23 June	Pier 40

=== Round 5 ===
Home	Score	Away	Match information
Home	Score	Away	Date and time	Venue
Brooklyn Kings RLFC	52-18	White Plains Wombats	Saturday 30 June	Bushwick Inlet Park
Tampa Mayhem	46-24	Atlanta Rhinos	Saturday 30 June	Tampa Catholic High School
Northern Virginia Eagles	44-28	New York Knights	Saturday 30 June	TBD
Philadelphia Fight	50-6	Boston 13s	Saturday 30 June	Garthwaite Stadium
Jacksonville Axemen	90-4	Southwest Florida Copperheads	Saturday 30 June	UNF Rugby Field

=== Round 6 ===
Home	Score	Away	Match information
Home	Score	Away	Date and time	Venue
White Plains Wombats	46-28	New York Knights	Saturday 14 July	White Plains High School
Boston 13s	36-34	Delaware Black Foxes	Saturday 14 July	Eastern Boston Stadium
Atlanta Rhinos	74-0	Southwest Florida Copperheads	Saturday 14 July	Atlanta Silverbacks Park
Philadelphia Fight	18-34	Brooklyn Kings RLFC	Saturday 14 July	Garthwaite Stadium
Jacksonville Axemen	54-28	Tampa Mayhem	Saturday 14 July	UNF Rugby Field

=== Round 7 ===
Home	Score	Away	Match information
Home	Score	Away	Date and time	Venue
Boston 13s	30-30	Northern Virginia Eagles	Saturday 21 July	Eastern Boston Stadium
Atlanta Rhinos	56-0	Tampa Mayhem	Saturday 21 July	Atlanta Silverbacks Park
Southwest Florida Copperheads	10-62	Jacksonville Axemen	Saturday 21 July	Lehigh Senior High School
Delaware Black Foxes	8-60	White Plains Wombats	Saturday 21 July	Eden Park Stadium
New York Knights	21-20	Philadelphia Fight	Saturday 21 July	Pier 40

=== Round 8 ===
Home	Score	Away	Match information
Home	Score	Away	Date and time	Venue
White Plains Wombats	52-12	Delaware Black Foxes	Saturday 28 July	White Plains High School
Tampa Mayhem	40-32	Southwest Florida Copperheads	Saturday 28 July	Tampa Catholic High School
Jacksonville Axemen	46-6	Atlanta Rhinos	Saturday 28 July	UNF Rugby Field
New York Knights	24-22	Boston 13s	Saturday 28 July	Pier 40

=== Conference Semi-final ===
Home	Score	Away	Match information
Home	Score	Away	Date and time	Venue
Brooklyn Kings RLFC	20-8	New York Knights	Saturday 4 August	Bushwick Inlet Park
Philadelphia Fight	14-16	White Plains Wombats	Saturday 4 August	Garthwaite Stadium
Atlanta Rhinos	68-10	Tampa Mayhem	Saturday 4 August	Atlanta Silverbacks Park
Jacksonville Axemen	88-0	Southwest Florida Copperheads	Saturday 4 August	UNF Rugby Field

=== National Semi-final ===
Home	Score	Away	Match information
Home	Score	Away	Date and time	Venue
Brooklyn Kings RLFC	34-18	White Plains Wombats	Saturday 11 August	Bushwick Inlet Park
Jacksonville Axemen	44-16	Atlanta Rhinos	Saturday 11 August	UNF Rugby Field

=== National Championship ===
Home	Score	Away	Match information
Home	Score	Away	Date and time	Venue
Jacksonville Axemen	56-16	Brooklyn Kings RLFC	Saturday 25 August	UNF Rugby Field
