= Atlanta Rhinos =

US semi-professional rugby league club, based in Atlanta, Georgia

Club information
- Full name: Atlanta Rhinos; Rugby League Football Club
- Nickname: The Rhinos
- Colours: Gold, Maroon, White and Black
- Founded: 2014; 12 years ago
- Website: atlrhinos.com

Current details
- Ground: Atlanta Silverbacks Park (5,000)
- CEO: Robert Taylor
- Coach: Sean Hunt
- Captain: Oche Armstrong
- Competition: USARL:

Records
- Premierships: 1 (USARL) (2017)
- Runners-up: 1 (USARL) (2015)
- Minor premierships: 2 (USARL) (2015, 2017)

The Atlanta Rhinos was an American Rugby League team based in Atlanta, Georgia. 2014 was their inaugural season in the USA Rugby League. They play all their home games at Atlanta Silverbacks Park.

== History ==
=== 2014-2020: Foundations and USARL ===
Atlanta were founded in early 2014 and joined the USARL Southern Conference. By March, it was announced that Atlanta would share a partnership with British Super League club Leeds Rhinos. The Rhinos stated they will help bring a professional approach to the Atlanta club by sharing information and playing talent. Following the announcement of the partnership with Leeds, Atlanta announced they would adopt Leeds' Rhinos moniker, colours and similar club crest.

The clubs first season in the USARL was positive winning two of their six Conference games and losing their first playoff game. They built on their positive first season by winning the 2015 Southern Conference and making it to the Grand Final, eventually losing 44-12 to Boston Thirteens. The Rhinos failed to build upon their success the following season finishing third however still qualifying for the playoffs and making the semifinals eventually losing to Jacksonville Axemen.

The 2017 season was another successful one for the Rhinos, winning the Southern Conference without losing having won five and drawn one game. They faced Northern Conference champions New York Knights in the Grand Final who they beat 32-18 to win their first major Championship. They were semi finalists again in 2018 losing again to eventual Champions Jacksonville Axemen.

In what would be their final season in the USARL the club were deducted two points for forfeiting a game in round 8 which lead to them finishing third in the Southern Conference and missing out on the playoffs.

=== 2021- 2022: NARL ===
It was announced in March 2021 that the Rhinos would withdraw from the USARL to compete in the professional North American Rugby League. The club also changed their logo, and colours to gold, maroon, white and black .

=== 2023 - Present: USARL ===
The Rhinos rejoined the USARL competition and now compete in the Florida Conference.

== Season History ==
Legend
National Champions
Runner Up

Atlanta Rhinos History
C = Champions, R = Runners-Ups, F = Finished first overall (Minor Premiers), P = Playoff Appearance, L = Finished Last (Brackets Represent Playoff Games)
Competition		Games Won	Games Drawn	Games Lost	Ladder Position	C	R	F	P	L	Notes
2014 USARL season	6	2	0	4 (1)	7/11				P		L, South Conference Semi-Finals, 42 – 26 vs Warriors
2015 USARL season	6	4 (2)	0	2 (1)	5/14		R		P		W, South Conference Semi-Finals, 32 - 26 vs Mayhem W, South Conference Finals, 32 - 28 vs Warriors L, National Championship, 44 - 12 vs Thirteens
2016 USARL season	6	2	1	3 (1)	10/14				P		L, South Conference Semi-Finals, 26 – 16 vs Mayhem
2017 USARL season	6	5 (2)	1	0	3/12	C			P		W, South Conference Finals, 32 - 24 vs Mayhem W, National Championship, 32 - 18 vs Knights
2018 USARL season	7	4 (1)	0	3 (1)	4/12	C			P		W, South Conference Semi-Finals, 68 - 10 vs Mayhem L, South Conference Finals, 44 - 16 vs Axemen
2019 USARL season	7	2	0	5	8/11						Missed playoffs
2020 USARL season	❌ Season cancelled (COVID-19)										
2021 NARL season	❌ Did not play (NARL cancellation)										
2022 USARL season	❌ Did not compete										
2023 USARL season	6	1	4	1	10/12						Missed playoffs
2024 USARL season	6	0	0	6	17/18						Missed playoffs
2025 USARL season	❌ Did not compete										

== Current squad ==
- (United States) Nick Newlin
- (United States) Fotukava Malu
- (Tonga) John Talisa
- (Fiji) Maciu Koroi
- (Nigeria) Frederick Henry-Ajudua
- (United States) Sean Hunt
- (Jamaica) Mike A. Williams

== Honours ==
=== League ===
- USARL:

Winners (1): 2017,
Runners up (1): 2015,
