= North American Rugby League =

Professional rugby league in North America

North American Rugby League (NARL)
- Sport: Rugby League
- Instituted: 2021
- Ceased: 2022
- CEO: Robert Curtis
- Website: narugbyleague.com
- Broadcast partner: SportsFlick

The North American Rugby League (NARL) was an unsanctioned rugby league club competition in North America.

At launch, the league announced fourteen teams; twelve from United States and two from Canada. An inaugural season was planned for 2021 but was deferred until 2022 (which itself never happened) due to increased health and safety needs regarding COVID-19 and insurance and travel costs.

== History ==
=== Background ===
An American based rugby league competition was first established in 1998 when the American NRL was formed. The organisation ran the AMNRL league competition and organised the USA national team and their fixtures. This competition lasted for 13 years until seven clubs left to form the USARL, citing the poor running of the competition as their reason for a breakaway.

The USARL was founded in 2011, however the AMNRL was still active, meaning there were two major rugby league competitions in the US. The AMNRL suffered from competition with the USARL and did not run a competition in 2013. The following year the AMNRL folded and handed over all control of the USA national team to the USARL making it the sole governing body and league competition in the US.

==== 2016–2020: North American clubs in Britain ====
In 2016, Toronto Wolfpack were founded and entered the British RFL system in League 1. They were promoted to Super League in 2019, however withdrew after seven rounds in 2020 following financial problems due to the COVID-19 pandemic, and were not readmitted for the 2021 season. The demise of Toronto and a report by then-Super League chief executive Robert Elstone saying there were no opportunities for rugby league in North America left doubts over transatlantic teams competing in the British rugby league system. However, the RFL later admitted Ottawa Aces and New York Rugby League. Ottawa, however, later relocated to the UK as Cornwall. New York's future in the UK remains unclear.

==== 2021: COVID-19 postponement ====
In March 2021 the North American Rugby League was announced and slated to include 14 founding teams: the two clubs previously accepted into the RFL (Ottawa and New York) as well as Toronto and recently formed Cleveland, along with three USARL clubs (Atlanta Rhinos, Boston Thirteens, and Brooklyn Kings RLFC), a former rugby union club, and six new clubs (Austin Armadillos, Las Vegas Blackjacks, Phoenix Venom, Portland Loggers, San Diego Swell, San Francisco Rush, and Washington D.C. Cavalry.

In April 2021, USARL issued a statement that NARL is not recognized or sanctioned by USARL (as the governing body for rugby league in the USA) and therefore anyone playing in the NARL was ineligible to play at international level.

The inaugural season was due to start on June 19, 2021, with Boston hosting the first four Eastern Conference games and Las Vegas hosting the Western Conference games on June 20, with all games to be streamed globally on SportsFlick. There are plans for clubs to draft 14 players who will be signed centrally by the NARL. On May 12, the league announced that the Western Conference would be postponed to 2022 as the teams were unable to arrange adequate insurance for the players.

On June 7, 2021, Robert Curtis, the league's chief operating officer, announced that competition would be suspended until 2022 due to cost issues and health and safety restrictions relating to COVID-19. Some friendly matches will be played and the Canada Cup will be contested by Toronto Wolfpack and Ottawa Aces.

Following the announcement of the league's suspension, USARL issued a statement that all NARL teams and players would be welcome to join USARL for the 2021 season.

The league has partnered with Italian sportswear company Macron, who will provide kits to all teams in the competition.

In October 2021, the Ottawa Aces announced their relocation back to the United Kingdom, where they had been originally formed, opting out of the NARL.

The league announced in late 2021 that it intends to launch with just 6 foundation clubs in spring 2022, 5 from the United States plus Toronto Wolfpack from Canada.

The Canada Cup went ahead for 2021 but DC Cavalry took Ottawa's places following the latter's relocation to Cornwall. The match was won by Toronto.

==== 2022: Second failed inaugural season ====
After an announcement for the 2022 season to start on May 21 followed by uncertainty, it was announced a day before on the NARL social media pages the expected kick off that there will be a pre-season trial on June 4 between Washington DC Cavalry and the Atlanta Rhinos. Atlanta won the match 34-24. In July 2022, Cleveland Rugby League withdrew from the competition, leaving it with four teams.

On 20 June 2023, Wolfpack withdrew from the competition as no seasons had occurred.

== Original proposal ==
Upon the announcement, the proposed structure of the league for 2021 would feature and East and West conferences for the United States teams followed by national playoffs and a separate Canada Cup for the Canadian teams. From 2022 onwards, with reduced restrictions from the COVID-19 pandemic, the Canadian sides would be integrated into the Easter Conferences with the Canada Cup still remaining a season opener in which future Canadian teams could join. The league was originally proposed to contain the following 14 teams:

Eastern Conference

- Cleveland Rugby League
- Brooklyn Kings RLFC
- White Plains Wombats
- Boston Thirteens
- Washington DC Cavalry

Western Conference

- Austin Armadillo
- Las Vegas Blackjacks
- Phoenix Venom
- Portland Logger
- San Diego Swell
- San Fansico Rush

Canada Cup

- Toronto Wolfpack
- Ottawa Aces

Of this, the only NARL match that has been played to date was the 2021 Canada Cup:

2021 Canada Cup

18 September 2021

Toronto Wolfpack	42–6	DC Cavalry (Note: Intended to be Ottawa Aces, but following the club's withdrawal from the NARL, D.C. Cavalry played in their place, thus preventing the cancellation of the match.)

Lamport Stadium, Toronto

== See also ==
- Canada Rugby League
- USA Rugby League
- Rugby league in Canada
- Rugby league in the United States
