= USA Rugby League =

Official governing body for rugby league in the United States

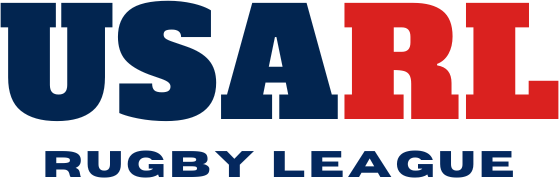
- Founded: January 12, 2011
- IRL affiliation: 2015
- Americas affiliation: 2014
- Responsibility: United States (from October 2014)
- Competitions: USA Rugby League

(United States)

The USA Rugby League (formally the US Association of Rugby League, Inc.) is the national governing body for rugby league in the United States.

The organization is responsible for running the domestic club competitions and the United States national rugby league team in addition to other responsibilities.

The body was founded in 2011 by clubs that had broken from the established American National Rugby League (AMNRL), plus expansion franchises. The USARL began its inaugural competition season in 2011 with eight teams.

The USARL was granted affiliate membership in November 2014 of the RLIF and RLEF, replacing the AMNRL which is now defunct.

== History ==
=== 2011–2013: Formation after schism with AMNRL ===
The formation of the USA Rugby League was announced on January 12, 2011. Seven teams that had previously competed in the American National Rugby League, the United States' established rugby league organization and recognized governing body for the sport, announced they were breaking with the AMNRL to form a new league. The stated reason for the split was dissatisfaction with the governance of the AMNRL; the departing teams were unhappy with the lack of club involvement in the league's decision making, and the new league was founded with the principle of including its member clubs in its administration.

USA Rugby League logo from 2014 to 2025

The departing AMNRL teams were the Boston Thirteens, the Washington, D.C. Slayers, the Fairfax Eagles, the Jacksonville Axemen, the New Haven Warriors, the Philadelphia Fight, and the Pittsburgh Vipers; they were to be joined by two new teams, the New Jersey Turnpike Titans and Kodiak Rugby from New York City. Before the season Pittsburgh and Fairfax became "developmental" teams in the new league outside of the top-tiered competition; Fairfax subsequently suspended operations. The New York team was unable to find a suitable stadium in the city, and instead became the Rhode Island Rebellion. One additional team, Oneida FC, joined the top-tiered competition for the 2011 season.

On January 13, 2011, the USARL announced that Peter Illfield, chairman of the Philadelphia Fight, would be the league's first chairman. The league's first event was a rugby league nines tournament in the Philadelphia area on May 28–29, 2011. Round 1 of the regular season championship kicked off on June 4; the Jacksonville Axemen won the minor premiership with the best regular season record. In the inaugural Grand Final on August 27, the Philadelphia Fight defeated the New Haven Warriors to win their first ever national championship.

In 2013 the USARL and AMNRL increased their focus on reunification, particularly after the United States' encouraging showing at the 2013 Rugby League World Cup. An independent commission assembled to lead negotiations, however the USARL clubs eventually pulled out. USARL commissioner Peter Illfield blamed apparent dysfunction and disorganization in the AMNRL organization for this decision. The USARL subsequently invited AMNRL clubs to join their ranks as full members and initiated a four-team expansion.

=== 2014: AMNRL collapse ===
In 2014, the USARL expanded to 10 teams, adding expansion squads Atlanta Rhinos, Central Florida Warriors, and Tampa Mayhem. In addition, the Northern Virginia Eagles withdrew from the AMNRL and joined the USARL. To reduce operating costs, the competition was split into two conferences. Meanwhile, the AMNRL suspended its 2014 season.

=== 2014–2020: Expansion ===
In 2015, three former AMNRL clubs joined the USARL; Bucks County Sharks, Connecticut Wildcats, and New York Knights. The Delaware Black Foxes also joined as an expansion squad. For 2016, the Connecticut Wildcats left the competition and were replaced by the White Plains Wombats. Before the 2017 season, the D.C. Slayers and Bucks County Sharks left the competition, and the USARL abolished the division structure within the North Conference. Before the 2018 season, the Central Florida Warriors left the competition and were replaced by Southwest Florida Copperheads and Danny Hanson was appointed the second league chairman. The Rhode Island Rebellion also left the competition. The New York Knights left the competition after the 2018 season.

=== 2021–2022: COVID-19 pandemic and NARL breakaway league ===
USARL membership has been in flux since the announcement of the North American Rugby League in spring 2021. Boston 13s and Philadelphia Fight left USARL to be founding members of the new competition. White Plains folded after NARL established the New York Freedom. Northern Virginia folded after most of its players joined the newly established DC Cavalry in NARL. Lakeland Renegades suspended operations due to the COVID-19 pandemic.

The 2021 USARL season was contested by six teams. Philadelphia and Delaware in the North; Tampa, Jacksonville, Southwest Florida Copperheads, and South Florida Speed in the South. USARL South Championships Tampa Mayhem defeated North winners Delaware Black Foxes in the championship. The North Division has been unable to play in 2022. Multiple forfeits by South Florida Speed in July 2022 have put their future with USARL in doubt.

=== 2023–present: Restructure, Women's and Youth focus, and expansion following NARL failure ===
2023 has seen significant expansion. Atlanta Rhinos rejoined the USARL, playing in the South Division. Pacific Coast Rugby League (PCRL) joined USARL, operating on the West Coast. PCRL brought Los Angeles Mongrel, San Diego Barracudas, and Santa Rosa Dead Pelicans – all formerly part of California Rugby League – as well as the newly formerly Los Angeles Bandidos into USARL. Additionally, four Utah teams, Riverton Seagulls, Herriman Roosters, Glendale Storm and Provo Broncos began playing USARL sanctioned matches as affiliates of PCRL. In August 2023, the first ever coast to coast National Champion was crowned with Santa Rosa Dead Pelicans defeating defending champions Jacksonville Axemen, 20–16.

In late December 2023, the USARL announced the introduction of Women's National Competition or the Women's Championship for 2024. 6 clubs from both coasts, Los Angeles Mongrel, San Diego Barracudas, and Santa Rosa Dead Pelicans joined to represent the Western Conference, while Carolina Valkyries, Tampa Mischief, Jacksonville Axewomen and New York State Queens to represent the Eastern Conference. The winner of each conference would face off to crown the National Women's Champion. In 2024, the governing body also announced the beginning of Youth Hawks, the Under 20 national team. This is first time since the late 1990s that a USA youth rugby league team will be put together.

In late April 2024, the USARL announced a new Regionalized structure to the national league. The Utah Rugby League Association would now operate as an independent entity distinct from the Pacific Coast Rugby League, managing its competition in accordance with USARL standards. At the end of the season, URLA and PCRL winners will play for the Western Championship, with the winner facing the Eastern Champions for the National Championship. Secondly, the unification effort on the East Coast of the United States sees the return of Boston 13s, Brooklyn Kings RLFC, and Delaware Black Foxes with Washington DC Cavalry joining as the Rugby League United competition becomes the Northeastern conference of USARL. Lastly, the USARL South would now become the Florida Rugby League, the rebranding affects both men's and women's teams in the region, including the Jacksonville Axemen and Axewomen, Southwest FL Copperheads, Tampa Mayhem and Mischief, and the Atlanta Rhinos.

In 2024, the USARL bid to host the 2029 Wheelchair and 2030 Men's Rugby League World Cup.

== Domestic competition ==
USA Rugby League
- Current season or competition: 2026 USARL season
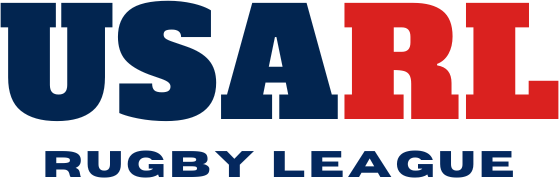
- Sport: Rugby league
- Instituted: 2011
- Inaugural season: 2011
- Number of teams: 13
- Country: United States
- Champions: Tampa Mayhem (2nd title) (2026)
- Most titles: Philadelphia Fight (4 titles)
- Website: usarl.org

=== Structure ===
==== 2024–Present ====
- USARL Grand Final
  - USARL Eastern Conference Final
    - Northeast Rugby league
    - Southeast Rugby league
  - USARL Western Conference Final
    - Northern California
    - Southern California

Starting in 2024, the USARL competition was expanded following teams withdrawing for the NARL in the years previous. The competition would be structured into four regional leagues across an East and West Conference. Winners of each league advance to their respective conference final before the winners of each facing each other in the Grand Final.

==== 2014–2023 ====
- USARL Grand Final
  - USARL Northern Conference (Note: Now New England Rugby League)
  - USARL Southern Conference (Note: Now Florida Rugby League)

Between 2014 and 2023 the USARL competition was split a Northern and Southern Conference with the top four teams advancing to their conference semi-final. Winners of each conference final would contest the Grand Final.

California Rugby League (now Pacific Coast Rugby League) was established in 2018 but was not integrated into the USARL competition until 2024.

==== 2011–2013 ====
- USARL Grand Final
  - USARL Regular Season

In the first three seasons of the league, clubs were only present in the North East thus only one geographic group was required. The top four teams advanced to the playoffs ending with the Grand Final.

=== Teams ===
==== Eastern Conference ====
Northeast Rugby League
Colors	Club	Founded	City (MSA)	Stadium	National Titles (Last)
	Boston Bears	2014	Boston	Briggs Field	1 (2015)
	Brooklyn Kings RLFC	2006	Brooklyn	Randalls Island Field 10	2 (2025)
	Delaware Black Foxes	2015	Wilmington, Delaware	Eden Park	0
	DC Cavalry	2021	Washington Metro	Battleground Athletic Complex	1 (2024)
	New York Knights	1997	New York City	Pelham Bay Park	0 (N/A)^{4}

Florida Rugby League
Colors	Club	Founded	City (MSA)	Stadium	National Titles (Last)
	Atlanta Copperheads	2018	Atlanta, GA	Roswell Area Park	0
	Jacksonville Axemen	2006	Jacksonville, FL	Rock Stadium	3 (2022)
	Sarasota Bull Sharks	2025	Sarasota, FL	Sarasota Rugby Club	0
	Tampa Mayhem	2014	Tampa, FL	Leto High School	2 (2026)

==== Western Conference ====
California
Colors	Club	Founded	City (MSA)	Stadium	National Titles (Last)
	Los Angeles Roosters	2022	Los Angeles, California	Warren High School	0
	Sacramento Immortals	2020	Sacramento, California	Danny Nunn Park	0
	San Diego Barracudas	2020	San Diego, California	Torrey Pines High School	0
	Santa Rosa Dead Pelicans	2018	Santa Rosa, California	For Pete's Sake Field	1 (2023)

== Unaffiliated Leagues ==
Utah Rugby League
Colors	Club	Founded	City (MSA)	Stadium	National Titles (Last)
	Glendale Storm	2022	Glendale, Utah	Burgess Park	0
	Herriman Roosters	2022	Herriman, Utah	Burgess Park	0
	Provo Broncos	2022	Provo, Utah	Burgess Park	0
	Riverton Seagulls	2022	Riverton, Utah	Burgess Park	0
	South Jordan Rabbitahz	2024	South Jordan, Utah	South Jordan Park	0
	Lehi Raiders	2025	Lehi, Utah	Burgess Park	0

=== Former teams ===
Former Teams
Colors	Club	Years Active	City (MSA)	Stadium	National Titles (Last)
	Atlanta Rhinos	2014-2025	Roswell, GA	Elkins Pointe Middle School	1 (2017)
	Baltimore Blues	2012–2014	Baltimore		0 (N/A)
	Bucks County Sharks	1997–2016	Bucks County, PA (Trenton)	Falls Township Park	0 (N/A)
	Central Florida Warriors	2014–2017	Deland, FL	Spec Martin Stadium	0 (N/A)
	Connecticut Wildcats	2003–2015	Norwalk, CT	Andrews Field	0 (N/A)
	D.C. Slayers	2003–2016	Washington, D.C.	Duke Ellington Field	0 (N/A)
	Northern Virginia Eagles	2007–2020	Nokesville, VA	Grizzly Sports Complex	0 (N/A)
	Los Angeles Mongrel	2019-2025	Los Angeles, California	Various	0
	Lakeland Renegades	2019–2020	Lakeland, FL	All Saints Academy	0 (N/A)
	New Haven Warriors	2006–2012	West Haven, CT (New Haven)	Ken Strong Stadium	0 (N/A)
	New Jersey Turnpike Titans	2011–2012	Jersey City, NJ	Cochran Stadium	0 (N/A)
	Oneida FC	2011–2012	Cambridge, MA	Henry G. Steinbrenner Stadium	0 (N/A)
	Philadelphia Fight	1998–2020	Conshohocken, PA (Philadelphia)	Garthwaite Stadium	4 (2016)
	Rhode Island Rebellion	2011–2017	Providence, RI	Marvel Field	0 (N/A)
	South Florida Speed	2021	Miami, FL	North Dade Optimist Park	0 (N/A)
	West LA Jackrabbits	2024-2026	Los Angeles, California		0
	White Plains Wombats	2016–2020	White Plains, NY	Blind Brook Elementary School	0 (N/A)
	916ers Rugby	2026	San Francisco Bay Area, California		0

=== National Championship ===
Season	National Championship
Season	Premiers	Score	Runners-up	Ref.
2011	Philadelphia Fight	28–26	New Haven Warriors
2012	Jacksonville Axemen	28–22	Boston 13s
2013	Philadelphia Fight	28–22	Jacksonville Axemen
2014	Philadelphia Fight	30–18	Jacksonville Axemen
2015	Boston 13s	44–12	Atlanta Rhinos
2016	Philadelphia Fight	42–20	Jacksonville Axemen
2017	Atlanta Rhinos	32–18	New York Knights
2018	Jacksonville Axemen	56–16	Brooklyn Kings
2019	Brooklyn Kings RLFC	12–6	Jacksonville Axemen
2020	Not held due to COVID-19
2021	Tampa Mayhem	60–10	Delaware Black Foxes
2022	Jacksonville Axemen	36–12	Tampa Mayhem
2023	Santa Rosa Dead Pelicans	20–16	Jacksonville Axemen
2024	DC Cavalry	Walkover	Provo Broncos
2025	Brooklyn Kings RLFC	34–18	Jacksonville Axemen
2026	Tampa Mayhem	30–26	Los Angeles Roosters

==== Winners by club ====
Winners	Count	Years
Philadelphia Fight	4	2011, 2013, 2014, 2016
Jacksonville Axemen	3	2012, 2018, 2022
Tampa Mayhem	2	2021, 2026
Brooklyn Kings RLFC	2	2019, 2025
Boston 13s	1	2015
Atlanta Rhinos	1	2017
Santa Rosa Dead Pelicans	1	2023
DC Cavalry	1	2024

== Development programs ==
As part of the 2011 season, a former AMNRL team, the Pittsburgh Sledgehammers, participated as a "developmental team", playing a more limited schedule while developing the club for future seasons.

== Representative sides ==
=== New England Immortals ===
New England Immortals

Team information
- Nickname: Immortals
- Governing body: AMNRL (2010); USARL (2011–present)
- Region: New England
- Head coach: (England) Robin Peers

Team results
- First game
- Immortals (New England) 12–8 Canada (New Jersey, United States; 31 July 2010)
- Biggest win
- Immortals (New England) 12–8 Canada (New Jersey, United States; 31 July 2010)
- Biggest defeat
- Immortals (New England) 12–68 Royal Marines (Rhode Island, United States; 27 April 2012)

The New England Immortals are an inactive representative rugby league football team selected from American players born in New England or those who play for clubs in New England.

==== History ====
===== AMNRL Years (2010) =====
The New England Immortals were founded in 2010 and consisted of the top players from the New England–based teams of the AMNRL – the Boston Thirteens, Connecticut Wildcats and the New Haven Warriors. Their logo is based on the Robert Gould Shaw Memorial located on Boston Common at the corner of Beacon and Park Street in Boston, MA. Colonel Shaw commanded the 54th Massachusetts Infantry Regiment during the civil war. There are six stars which represent the six states that make up New England, while the red white and blue symbolize not only the national colors of the U.S., but also hardiness, valour, vigilance, and perseverance.

They played their inaugural match against the Canadian National Team at the 2010 AMNRL "War at the Shore", on July 31, 2010, defeating the Canadians 12–8 in a tightly contested match.

===== USARL Years (2011–2012) =====
After the AMNRL/USARL split in 2011, the Immortals joined the latter. Due to the regulations of the separation outlined by the RLIF, only players registered in the AMNRL competition qualified for selection to the USA Tomahawks. Under that same ruling, the Connecticut Wildcats (who opted to stay with the AMNRL) were dropped from selections to the Immortals. The Immortals was now the only representative rugby available to USARL players.

In April 2012, Head Coach Robin Peers named the 23-man roster that would make up the New England Immortal side that would represent their region against the British Royal Marines at Tucker Field in Cumberland, Rhode Island, at the end of the month. Despite the loss of the Connecticut, the expanded player pool from newly formed Oneida FC and the Rhode Island Rebellion saw a new breed Immortals, with only three returning veterans. The Immortals took to the field for their second match since their inception, and despite putting up a hard fight, they were out classed by the more experienced Marines, losing by a score of 68–12.

As of 2014, due to budgetary cuts and restructuring of the USARL competition, the Immortals have not played a match since their loss to the Royal Marines.

==== Results ====
31 July 2010: Immortals vs. Canada
Result: W 12 - 8 Coach: Mikhael Shammas
No.	Player name	Position	Club	Tries	Con	Pen	DK	Points
1	Lance Gaines	Fullback	Boston Thirteens	-	-	-	-	-
2	Tyler Scullen	Right wing	Boston Thirteens	-	-	-	-	-
3	Jonathan Mixon	Right center	Boston Thirteens	1	-	-	-	4
4	Joe Roucken	Left center	New Haven Warriors	-	-	-	-	-
5	Brian Lee	Left wing	New Haven Warriors	-	-	-	-	-
6	Nathan Debartolo	Five-Eight	Connecticut Wildcats	-	2	-	-	4
7	Benjamin McHugh	Half-back	Boston Thirteens	-	-	-	-	-
8	Justin Xenelis	Prop	New Haven Warriors	-	-	-	-	-
9	Jeffrey Perkins	Hooker	Boston Thirteens	1	-	-	-	4
10	Mike Schachter	Prop	Connecticut Wildcats	-	-	-	-	-
11	Matt Troila-Kelliher	Second row	Boston Thirteens	-	-	-	-	-
12	Curtis Cunz	Second row	Connecticut Wildcats	-	-	-	-	-
13	Michael Bozza	Lock	Boston Thirteens	-	-	-	-	-
14	Sean Donahoe	Reserve	Boston Thirteens	-	-	-	-	-
15	Kenneth Stern	Reserve	Connecticut Wildcats	-	-	-	-	-
16	Nate Bangura	Reserve	Boston Thirteens	-	-	-	-	-
17	Chris Carter	Reserve	Boston Thirteens	-	-	-	-	-
18	Nick Rutberg	Reserve	Boston Thirteens	-	-	-	-	-
19	Kyle Winter	Reserve	Boston Thirteens	-	-	-	-	-

27 April 2012: Immortals vs. British Royal Marines
Result: L 12 - 68 Coach: Robin Peers
No.	Player name	Position	Club	Tries	Con	Pen	DK	Points
1	Cam Correira	Fullback	Rhode Island Rebellion	-	-	-	-	-
2	Brian Lee	Right wing	New Haven Warriors	1	-	-	-	4
3	Eric Gonzales	Right center	Rhode Island Rebellion	-	-	-	-	-
4	John Mixon	Left center	Boston Thirteens	-	-	-	-	-
5	Matthew Tannozzini	Left wing	Rhode Island Rebellion	-	-	-	-	-
6	Shain Singleton	Five-Eight	Rhode Island Rebellion	1	-	-	-	4
7	Derek Trahan	Half-back	Rhode Island Rebellion	-	1	1	-	4
8	Matthew Callan	Prop	New Haven Warriors	-	-	-	-	-
9	Brian Schact	Hooker	New Haven Warriors	-	-	-	-	-
10	Steve Crandall	Prop	Rhode Island Rebellion	-	-	-	-	-
11	Tim Prada	Second row	Boston Thirteens	-	-	-	-	-
12	Fred Jacobs	Second row	Rhode Island Rebellion	-	-	-	-	-
13	Brad Crandall	Lock	Rhode Island Rebellion	-	-	-	-	-
14	Jose Montanez	Reserve	Rhode Island Rebellion	-	-	-	-	-
15	Brian Amaral	Reserve	Rhode Island Rebellion	-	-	-	-	-
16	Antony Nardollio	Reserve	Rhode Island Rebellion	-	-	-	-	-
17	Jesse Pearce	Reserve	Oneida FC	-	-	-	-	-
18	Joe Roucken	Reserve	New Haven Warriors	-	-	-	-	-
19	Greg Richer	Reserve	Oneida FC	-	-	-	-	-
20	Jeremy Rinn	Reserve	Rhode Island Rebellion	-	-	-	-	-
21	Dan Green	Reserve	Oneida FC	-	-	-	-	-
22	Tam Tran	Reserve	Boston Thirteens	-	-	-	-	-
23	Matthew Troila-Kelliher	Reserve	Boston Thirteens	-	-	-	-	-

=== USA Pioneers ===
Men's

In 2014, the league established a touring developmental side, the USA Pioneers, to play friendly matches against foreign nations. They completed a two match tour in Jamaica in April 2014, winning their first game against a Jamaican domestic outfit, but fell short to the semi-professional Hurricanes Rugby League whilst still proving to be strong opposition for the Jamaicans. The Pioneers played a friendly against a touring New Zealand Police squad the following August, losing 6–62.

Women's

A women's USA Pioneers side played in the Americas qualification tournament for the 2026 Women's Rugby League World Cup as a result of Brazil's late withdrawal. Naturally, they were unable to take a qualification spot if victorious. They played Canada who received as semi-final bye as the highest ranked side, and Jamaica who lost their semi-final against the United States. The Pioneers lost 0–80 to Canada, and 12–48 to Jamaica, finishing last.

=== Presidents Barbarians ===
The USARL established another team to play a second match against the New Zealand Police and to 'curtain-raise' the 2014 USARL National Championship between the Philadelphia Fight and the Jacksonville Axemen. This representative consisted of overseas-imports from Australia, New Zealand, United Kingdom and France; similar to Super League's Exiles. They were beaten by the Kiwis 16–46.

=== List ===
USARL Representative teams
Club	Representation	Established	Match history
New England Immortals	New England	2010	W 12–8 Canada July 31, 2010; L 12–68 (United Kingdom) Royal Marines April 27, 2012
(United States) USARL Pioneers	Development (non-internationals)	2013	W 46–26 (Jamaica) Duhaney Park Red Sharks April 3, 2013; L 30–50 (Jamaica) Hurricanes Rugby League April 7, 2013; L 6–62 New Zealand Blue Thunder August 16, 2013
Presidents Barbarians	'Exiles' (overseas imports)	2013	L 16–46 New Zealand Blue Thunder August 23, 2013
(United States) NORTH Conference All-Stars	North of America	2015	L 20–34 (United States) SOUTH Conference All-Stars August 29, 2015 L 32–38 (United States) SOUTH Conference All-Stars October 22, 2016
(United States) SOUTH Conference All-Stars	South of America	2015	W 34–20 (United States) NORTH Conference All-Stars August 29, 2015 W 38–32 (United States) NORTH Conference All-Stars October 22, 2016

== See also ==
- Rugby league in the United States
- Rugby League World Cup
- North American Rugby League
- American National Rugby League
- List of American rugby league champions
- List of defunct rugby league clubs in the United States
