= 2023 USARL season =

- League: USA Rugby League
- Duration: June 3rd - September 14th, 2023
- Teams: 12
- Minor premiers: Santa Rosa Dead Pelicans (1st title)
- Champions: Santa Rosa Dead Pelicans (1st title)

The 2023 USA Rugby League season was the 26th season overall of amateur and semi-professional rugby league competition in the United States and the 11th season under the governance of the USARL.

With the inclusion of the Pacific Coast Rugby League, the competition is now officially played on both coasts of the United States, with the winner being the first-ever coast to coast National Champion in American rugby league history. The league sees a boost in participating clubs from four in 2022 to twelve in 2023. Two more clubs will join in 2024.

== Clubs ==
Pacific Coast Conference (California Division)
Colors	Club	Founded	City (MSA)	Stadium
	Los Angeles Mongrel	2019	Los Angeles, California	Various
	Los Angeles Bandidos	2022	Los Angeles, California	Various
	San Diego Barracudas	2020	San Diego, California	Various
	Santa Rosa Dead Pelicans	2018	Santa Rosa, California	For Pete's Sake Field

Pacific Coast Conference (Utah Division)
Colors	Club	Founded	City (MSA)	Stadium
	Glendale Storm	2022	Glendale, Utah	Burgess Park
	Herriman Roosters	2022	Herriman, Utah	Burgess Park
	Provo Broncos	2022	Provo, Utah	Burgess Park
	Riverton Seagulls	2022	Riverton, Utah	Burgess Park

South Conference
Colors	Club	Founded	City (MSA)	Stadium	Titles (Last)
	Atlanta Rhinos	2014	Roswell, GA	Elkins Pointe Middle School	1 (2017)
	Jacksonville Axemen	2006	Jacksonville, FL	UNF Rugby Field	3 (2022)
	Southwest Florida Copperheads	2018	Naples, FL	Paradise Coast Sports Complex	0 (N/A)
	Tampa Mayhem	2014	Tampa, FL	Hillsborough High School	1 (2021)

== Regular season ==
Week One (June 3)
Colors	Home team	Score	Away team	Colors	Venue
	Los Angeles Mongrel	22-22	San Diego Barracudas		Van Nuys High School (Van Nuys, CA)
	Atlanta Rhinos	12-42	Tampa Mayhem		Elkins Point Middle School (Roswell, GA)

Week Two (June 17–18)
Colors	Home team	Score	Away team	Colors	Venue
	Santa Rosa Dead Pelicans	40-14	Los Angeles Bandidos		For Pete's Sake Field (Santa Rosa, CA)
	San Diego Barracudas	34-24	Los Angeles Mongrel		Cesar Chavez Park (San Diego, CA)
	Jacksonville Axemen	32-16	Southwest Florida Copperheads		University of North Florida (Jacksonville, Florida)

Week Three (June 24)
Colors	Home team	Score	Away team	Colors	Venue
	Atlanta Rhinos	88-16	Southwest Florida Copperheads		SilverBack Park (Atlanta, GA)
	Tampa Mayhem	46-28	Jacksonville Axemen		Hillsborough High School (Tampa, FL)
	Los Angeles Mongrel	6-60	Santa Rosa Dead Pelicans		Van Nuys High School (Van Nuys, CA)

Week Four (July 1–2)
Colors	Home team	Score	Away team	Colors	Venue
	Herriman Roosters	30-44	Riverton Seagulls		Burgess Park (Alpine, UT)
	Glendale Storm	22-48	Provo Broncos		Burgess Park (Alpine, UT)

**Due to the 2023 Western North America heat wave, matches between San Diego/Santa Rosa and Los Angeles Mongrel/Los Angeles Bandidos were declared as a NO RESULT.**

Week Five (July 7–8)
Colors	Home team	Score	Away team	Colors	Venue
	Riverton Seagulls	52-44	Glendale Storm		Burgess Park (Alpine, UT)
	Provo Broncos	54-36	Herriman Roosters		Burgess Park (Alpine, UT)
	Atlanta Rhinos	26-46	Jacksonville Axemen		SilverBack Park (Atlanta, GA)

Week Six (July 14–15)
Colors	Home team	Score	Away team	Colors	Venue
	Jacksonville Axemen	80-6	Atlanta Rhinos		University of North Florida (Jacksonville, Florida)
	Tampa Mayhem	50-10	Southwest Florida Copperheads		Hillsborough High School (Tampa, FL)
	Los Angeles Bandidos	18-60	Santa Rosa Dead Pelicans		El Dorado Park (Long Beach, CA)
	Riverton Seagulls	DRAW	Provo Broncos		Burgess Park (Alpine, UT)
	Herriman Roosters	84-24	Glendale Storm		Burgess Park (Alpine, UT)

Week Seven (July 22–23)
Colors	Home team	Score	Away team	Colors	Venue
	Santa Rosa Dead Pelicans	40-0	Los Angeles Mongrel		For Pete's Sake Field (Santa Rosa, CA)
	Los Angeles Bandidos	36-24	San Diego Barracudas		Chittick Field (Long Beach, CA)
	Riverton Seagulls	DRAW	Herriman Roosters		Burgess Park (Alpine, UT)
	Provo Broncos	DRAW	Glendale Storm		Burgess Park (Alpine, UT)
	Tampa Mayhem	54-18	Atlanta Rhinos		Hillsborough High School (Tampa, FL)
	Southwest Florida Copperheads	6-70	Jacksonville Axemen		Paradise Coast Sports Complex (Naples, FL)

Week Eight (July 29–30)
Colors	Home team	Score	Away team	Colors	Venue
	Jacksonville Axemen	16-12	Tampa Mayhem		University of North Florida (Jacksonville, Florida)
	Santa Rosa Dead Pelicans	40-0	San Diego Barracudas		For Pete's Sake Field (Santa Rosa, CA)
	Los Angeles Mongrel	8-28	Los Angeles Bandidos		Van Nuys High School (Van Nuys, CA)
	Glendale Storm	48-44	Riverton Seagulls		Burgess Park (Alpine, UT)
	Herriman Roosters	20-34	Provo Broncos		Burgess Park (Alpine, UT)

Week Nine (August 5–6)
Colors	Home team	Score	Away team	Colors	Venue
	San Diego Barracudas	40-0	Los Angeles Bandidos		Cesar Chavez Park (San Diego, CA)

== League standings ==
Pacific Coast Conference (California Division)
Colors	#	Club	P	W	D	L	PF	PA	PD	Pts
	1	Santa Rosa Dead Pelicans	6	5	1	0	240	38	+202	11
	2	San Diego Barracudas	6	2	2	2	120	122	-2	6
	3	Los Angeles Bandidos	6	2	3	1	96	172	-76	5
	4	Los Angeles Mongrel	6	0	4	2	60	184	-124	2

Pacific Coast Conference (Utah Division)
Colors	#	Club	P	W	D	L	PF	PA	PD	Pts
	1	Provo Broncos	6	3	1	2	136	78	+58	8
	2	Riverton Seagulls	6	2	2	2	140	122	+18	6
	3	Herriman Roosters	6	1	4	1	170	156	+14	6
	4	Glendale Storm	6	1	4	1	138	228	-90	6

South Conference
Colors	Club	P	W	D	L	PF	PA	PD	Pts
	Tampa Mayhem	6	5	0	1	246	96	+150	10
	Jacksonville Axemen	6	5	0	1	272	112	+160	10
	Atlanta Rhinos	6	1	4	1	150	238	-112	3
	Southwest Florida Copperheads	6	0	1	5	60	282	-222	1

== National Semi-Final #1 : USARL South Conference Championship (Tampa vs Jacksonville) ==
USARL South Conference Championship (August 5)
Colors	Home team	Score	Away team	Colors	Venue
	Tampa Mayhem	6-30	Jacksonville Axemen		Hillsborough High School (Tampa, FL)

== National Semi-Final #2: Pacific Coast Conference Championship (California champion vs. Utah champion) ==
Pacific Coast Conference Championship (California vs. Utah) (August 12)
Colors	Home team	Score	Away team	Colors	Venue
	Santa Rosa Dead Pelicans (California Champion)	12-36	Provo Broncos § (Utah Champion)		For Pete's Sake Field (Santa Rosa, CA)

(§): On August 15, 2023, the Pacific Coast Rugby League, USA Rugby League, and the Utah Rugby League Association announced that the Provo Broncos had been stripped of the PCRL championship title due to a breach of league rules during the PCRL championship game on August 12, for knowingly fielding an ineligible player.

== USA Rugby League National Championship: Jacksonville vs. Santa Rosa ==
USA Rugby League National Championship (September 14, 2023)
Colors	Home team	Score	Away team	Colors	Venue
	Jacksonville Axemen (USARL South Champions) (6–0–1)	16-20	Santa Rosa Dead Pelicans (Pacific Coast Rugby League Champions) (6–1–0)		University of North Florida (Jacksonville, Florida)
