= A. P. Leto High School =

Public high school in Florida, United States

A.P. Leto High School

Location
- 4409 W Sligh Ave; Tampa, Florida, 33614, U.S. 28°00′41″N 82°31′07″W

Information
- Type: Public high school
- Established: 1965
- School district: Hillsborough County Public Schools
- Principal: Babita Artabasy
- Teaching staff: 94.00 (FTE)
- Grades: 9–12
- Enrollment: 2,025 (2023–2024)
- Student to teacher ratio: 21.54
- Campus type: Suburb
- Colors: Red, Gold and White
- Mascot: Falcons
- Nickname: Falcons
- Website: www.hillsboroughschools.org/o/leto

A. P. Leto High School is a public high school within the Hillsborough County Public Schools system in Tampa, Florida, United States. In addition to the four high school grades, Leto also hosts adult night services. The school principal is Babita Artabasy.

== Demographics ==
As of 2016, Leto High School is 74% Hispanic, 11% White, 7% Black, and < 8% other.

The school currently operates as a Title I school (receives additional funds from the federal government) with 98.4% of the student population eligible for free or reduced lunch.

== History ==
Originally called A.P. Leto Comprehensive High School, it was named in honor of Ateo Phillip Leto, a former principal at Jefferson High School and at Chamberlain High School in Tampa. He was originally to serve as the school's first principal, but he died before the school year began. The first principal of Leto was Frank M. Farmer.

Established in 1965 with grades 9–11, which meant that the first graduating class was not until 1967, Leto was the first comprehensive high school in Hillsborough County. It was "comprehensive" because in addition to the high school academic curriculum, Leto offered several modern vocational options for students. Although the largest school in Hillsborough County, it originally lacked a gymnasium, a stadium, baseball and softball fields, which were added in the 1970s. According to Leto's official website, the students of the first graduating class of 1967 chose the school's colors, mascot, alma mater and several other traditions that continue to be practiced at Leto High. The school opened with 1,670 students its first year and is situated on 37 acres (150,000 m^{2}).

On August 2, 2025, Scott Hazlett, principal of the school at the time, was arrested for possession of cocaine and driving under the influence of alcohol. Since then, Babita Artabasy has been made the interim principal.

== Magnet school ==
Created in 2013, Collegiate Academy is a magnet program provided by Hillsborough Community College. Students enrolled in this program will take college classes while on Leto's campus earning a two-year Associate of Arts degree while also earning their high school diploma.

== Publications ==
- The Talon – student-run and produced yearbook

== School report card ==
According to the Florida Department of Education, Leto High received the following "grades" between 1998 and 2018:

2024–25 = B
2017–18 = C
2016–17 = C
2015–16 = ?
2014–15 = F
2013–14 = F
2008–09 = D
2007–08 = D
2006–07 = F
2005–06 = F
2004–05 = D
2003–04 = D
2002–03 = D
2001–02 = D
2000–01 = C
1999–00 = C
1998–99 = C

== Improvement ==
Leto was one of 16 schools nationwide selected by the College Board for inclusion in the EXCELerator "School Improvement Model" program, beginning in the 2007–2008 school year. The project was funded by the Bill & Melinda Gates Foundation.

Leto during its 50th anniversary received funding to remodel and restore the campus to how it was during its first opening.

== Notable alumni ==
- Hercules 1974 – professional wrestler
- Gary Huff 1969 – NFL football player who quarterbacked the first win in Buccaneers history in 1977
- Matt Vogler – football player
- Michael Jenkins (wide receiver) – football player
