= 2021 USARL season =

Season of the USA Rugby League

2021 USARL Season
- League: USA Rugby League
- Duration: June 12 - August 28, 2021
- Teams: 6
- Matches played: 16
- Points scored: 871 (avg 54 per game)

2021 season
- Champions: Tampa Mayhem (1st title)
- Runners-up: Delaware Black Foxes
- Biggest home win: Tampa Mayhem 72 - 0 South Florida Speed (July 3rd)
- Biggest away win: Tampa Mayhem 18 - 40 Jacksonville Axemen (June 12th)

The 2021 USA Rugby League season is the 24th season overall of amateur and semi-professional rugby league competition in the United States and the 11th season under the governance of the USARL.

USARL membership was in flux since the announcement of the North American Rugby League in Spring 2021. Atlanta Rhinos, Boston 13s and Philadelphia Fight left USARL to be founding members of the new competition. White Plains folded after NARL established the New York Freedom. Northern Virginia folded after most of its players joined the newly established DC Cavalry in NARL. Lakeland Renegades suspended operations due to the COVID-19 pandemic.

The 2021 USARL season was contested by six teams. Philadelphia and Delaware in the North; Tampa, Jacksonville, Southwest Florida Copperheads, and South Florida Speed in the South.

== Participating clubs ==
North
Club	Founded	City (MSA)	State	Stadium	Titles (Last)
Delaware Black Foxes	2015	Wilmington	Delaware	Eden Park Stadium	0 (N/A)
Philadelphia Fight	1998	Conshohocken (Philadelphia)	Pennsylvania	Garthwaite Stadium	4 (2016)

South
Club	Founded	City (MSA)	State	Stadium	Titles (Last)
Jacksonville Axemen	2006	Jacksonville	Florida	UNF Rugby Field	2 (2018)
South Florida Speed	2021	Miami	Florida	North Dade Optimist Park	0 (N/A)
Southwest Florida Copperheads	2018	Naples	Florida	Paradise Coast Sports Complex	0 (N/A)
Tampa Mayhem	2014	Tampa Bay	Florida	Keystone Prep High School (Tampa)	0 (N/A)

== Fixtures and results ==
Week 1
Home	Score	Away	Match Information		
Home	Score	Away	Date and Time (EST)	Venue	Report
Tampa Mayhem	18 - 40	Jacksonville Axemen	June 12	Keystone Prep High School (Tampa)	
Southwest Florida Copperheads	40 - 6	South Florida Speed	June 12	Paradise Coast Sports Complex	

Week 2
Home	Score	Away	Match Information		
Home	Score	Away	Date and Time (EST)	Venue	Report
South Florida Speed	22 - 24	Southwest Florida Copperheads	June 19	North Dade Optimist Park	

Week 3
Home	Score	Away	Match Information		
Home	Score	Away	Date and Time (EST)	Venue	Report
Jacksonville Axemen	56 - 14	Southwest Florida Copperheads	June 26	UNF Rugby Field	
South Florida Speed	0 - 30	Tampa Mayhem	June 26	North Dade Optimist Park	
Delaware Black Foxes	74 - 10	Philadelphia Fight	June 26	Eden Park Stadium	

Week 4
Home	Score	Away	Match Information		
Home	Score	Away	Date and Time (EST)	Venue	Report
Tampa Mayhem	72 - 0	South Florida Speed	July 3	Keystone Prep High School (Tampa)	
Southwest Florida Copperheads	26 - 30	Jacksonville Axemen	July 10	Paradise Coast Sports Complex	

Week 5
Home	Score	Away	Match Information		
Home	Score	Away	Date and Time (EST)	Venue	Report
Jacksonville Axemen	55 - 16	South Florida Speed	July 17	UNF Rugby Field	
Southwest Florida Copperheads	24 - 28	Tampa Mayhem	July 17	Paradise Coast Sports Complex	

Week 6
Home	Score	Away	Match Information		
Home	Score	Away	Date and Time (EST)	Venue	Report
Jacksonville Axemen	30 - 20	Tampa Mayhem	July 24	UNF Rugby Field	
Philadelphia Fight	14 - 30	Delaware Black Foxes	July 24	Garthwaite Stadium	

Week 7
Home	Score	Away	Match Information		
Home	Score	Away	Date and Time (EST)	Venue	Report
Tampa Mayhem	30 - 0	Southwest Florida Copperheads	July 31	Keystone Prep High School (Tampa)	
Delaware Black Foxes*	50 - 10	Philadelphia Fight	July 31	Eden Park Stadium	

^{*Delaware qualifies for USARL Grand Final}

== Standings ==
South Rugby League Standings
Pos	Team	Pld	W	D	L	PF	PA	PD	Pts	Qualification
1	Tampa Mayhem (C)	6	6	0	0	211	68	+143	12	Playoffs
2	Jacksonville Axemen	6	4	0	2	178	94	+84	8	Playoffs
3	Southwest Florida Copperheads	6	2	0	4	90	170	-80	4	
4	South Florida Speed	6	0	0	6	44	221	-177	0	

North Rugby League Standings
Pos	Team	Pld	W	D	L	PF	PA	PD	Pts	Qualification
1	Delaware Black Foxes	3	3	0	0	154	30	+124	6	North Champion
2	Philadelphia Fight	3	0	0	3	30	154	-124	0	

== Playoffs ==
Southeast Final
Home	Score	Away	Match Information		
Home	Score	Away	Date and Time (PST)	Venue	Report
Jacksonville Axemen	14 - 18	Tampa Mayhem	August 14, 2021/6:30 PM	UNF Rugby Field	

USA Rugby League National Championship
Home	Score	Away	Match Information		
Home	Score	Away	Date and Time (EST)	Venue	Report
Tampa Mayhem	60 - 10	Delaware Black Foxes	August 28, 2021/2:00 PM	Sportsplex of Tampa	
