= 2022 USARL season =

2022 USARL Season
- League: USA Rugby League
- Duration: June 11-August 14
- Teams: 4
- Minor premiers: Jacksonville Axemen

2022 season
- Champions: Jacksonville Axemen

The 2022 USA Rugby League season is the 24th season overall of amateur and semi-professional rugby league competition in the United States and the 10th season under the governance of the USARL.

2022 in United States rugby league saw an eventful season, featuring developments in the governance of the sport within the United States, the split between the United States Association of Rugby League (USARL) and the North American Rugby League (NARL) in regards to the national competition, and the conduction of multiple regional leagues below these.

== Clubs ==
Although seven teams were scheduled to participate in the 2022 season, from four states, the entire North Conference was cancelled, leaving only four teams, all from Florida, to compete in the season.

North Conference (Cancelled for 2022)
Colors	Club	Founded	City (MSA)	State	Stadium	Titles (Last)
	Boston Thirteens	~~2009~~	Boston	Massachusetts	Eastern Boston Stadium	1 (2015)
	Brooklyn Kings RLFC	~~2014~~	Brooklyn	New York	Randalls Island Field 10	None
	Delaware Black Foxes	~~2015~~	~~Wilmington~~	Delaware	Eden Park Stadium	None

South Conference
Colors	Club	Founded	City (MSA)	State	Stadium	Titles (Last)
	Jacksonville Axemen	2006	Jacksonville	Florida	UNF Rugby Field	2 (2018)
	South Florida Speed	2022	Miami	Florida	North Dade Optimist Park	0 (N/A)
	Southwest Florida Copperheads	2018	Buckingham (Fort Myers)	Florida	Lehigh Senior High School	0 (N/A)
	Tampa Mayhem	2014	Tampa Bay	Florida	Tampa Catholic High School	0 (N/A)

== Regular season ==
=== Round 1 ===
Home team	Score	Away team	Date	Venue
Southwest Florida Copperheads	88–4	South Florida Speed	Saturday June 11	Paradise Coast Sports Complex

=== Round 2 ===
Home team	Score	Away team	Date	Venue
Tampa Mayhem	24–12	Southwest Florida Copperheads	Saturday June 18	Leto Falcons Field
South Florida Speed	0–80	Jacksonville Axemen	Saturday June 18	Ives Estates Park

=== Round 3 ===
Home team	Score	Away team	Date	Venue
Southwest Florida Copperheads	6–20	Tampa Mayhem	Saturday June 25	Paradise Coast Sports Complex
Jacksonville Axemen	30–0	South Florida Speed	Saturday June 25	UNF Rugby Field

=== Round 4 ===
Home team	Score	Away team	Date	Venue
Tampa Mayhem	8–16	Jacksonville Axemen	Saturday July 9	Leto Falcons Field

=== Round 5 ===
Home team	Score	Away team	Date	Venue
South Florida Speed	0–30	Tampa Mayhem	Saturday July 16	Ives Estates Park
Jacksonville Axemen	70–16	Southwest Florida Copperheads	Saturday July 16	UNF Rugby Field

=== Round 6 ===
Home team	Score	Away team	Date	Venue
South Florida Speed	0–30	Southwest Florida Copperheads	Saturday July 23	Ives Estates Park
Jacksonville Axemen	36–26	Tampa Mayhem	Saturday July 23	UNF Rugby Field

=== Round 7 ===
Home team	Score	Away team	Date	Venue
Tampa Mayhem	30–0	South Florida Speed	Saturday July 30	Leto Falcons Field
Southwest Florida Copperheads	16–30	Jacksonville Axemen	Saturday July 30	Paradise Coast Sports Complex

Source: USA Rugby League | USARL | XIIIs SOUTH Conference

== Ladder ==
Standings	P	W	T	L	PF	PA	+/-	Pts
Jacksonville Axemen (P)	6	6	0	0	262	66	+196	12
Tampa Mayhem (Q)	6	4	0	2	138	70	+68	8
Southwest Florida Copperheads	6	2	0	4	168	148	+20	4
South Florida Speed	6	0	0	6	4	288	-284	0

(P): Minor Premiers (Q): Qualified USA Rugby League Finals

Source: USA Rugby League | USARL | XIIIs Competition StandingsUSARL Standings

=== North Conference Exhibition Matches ===
Following the abandonment of the North Conference season, the USARL organized a series of exhibition matches between the three North Conference sides and independent former NARL side New York Freedom.

Home team	Score	Away team	Date	Venue
Brooklyn Kings RLFC	50–16	Boston Thirteens	Bushwick Inlet Park	Saturday July 23
New York Freedom	30–36	Delaware Black Foxes	Bushwick Inlet Park	Saturday July 23

Source: Past National Champs Win Big in NYC

== Grand Final: Tampa vs Jacksonville ==
Home team	Score	Away team	Date	Venue
Jacksonville Axemen	36–12	Tampa Mayhem	Saturday August 14	UNF Rugby Field

Full Match: Jacksonville Axemen vs Tampa Mayhem Rugby League 2022-08-13 Match Review: Jacksonville Wins 2022 USARL Championship
