= Tampa Mayhem =

Rugby League Football Club, based in Tampa, Florida

Club information
- Full name: Tampa Mayhem; Rugby League Football Club
- Nickname: Mayhem
- Colours: Blue; Orange; Grey
- Founded: 2014; 12 years ago

Current details
- Ground: Hillsborough High School
- CEO: Billy Neilson, Christopher Dickenson
- Coach: Liam Mulhall
- Captain: Joe Eichner
- Competition: Florida Rugby League

The Tampa Mayhem are an American rugby league team based in Tampa, Florida. 2014 was their inaugural season in the USA Rugby League.

== History ==
The Tampa Mayhem were founded in early 2014 by a group of local rugby enthusiasts, led by Billy Neilson and Dan "Otter" Slagle.

In 2021, the Mayhem had their greatest season to date, upsetting the undefeated Jacksonville Axemen in the South Conference Championship, 18-14, before defeating the Delaware Black Foxes 60-10 in the USARL Grand Final. The following season, Tampa advanced to their second consecutive Grand Final, though they were defeated by Jacksonville 36-12.

== Current Squad ==
Squad for 2026 USARL season.

- 1.Will Keels (Fullback)
- 2.Demietre Chaney (Wing)
- 3.Aldo Karamoy (Centre)
- 4.Donte Salter (Centre)
- 5.Napoleon Hunter (Wing)
- 6.Riley Moore (Five-eighth)
- 7.Ky Rashleigh (Halfback)
- 8.Justin Branca (Prop)
- 9.Bart Longchamp (Hooker)
- 10.Sione Talisa (Prop)
- 11.Matt Finnesy (Second-row)
- 12.Justin Davenport (Second-row)
- 13.Joe Eichner (Lock)
- 14.Marcelo Vila (Second-row)
- 15.Gareth Friedrich (Lock)
- 16.Jaxen Hilbush (Second-row)
- 17.Chadd Wheelington (Prop)
- 18.Jadyn Jeanes (Five-eighth)
- 19.Fletcher Vandeman (Centre)
- 20.Dejon Taylor (Prop)
- 21.Tim Turaga (Prop)

== Seasons ==
Season	League							Play-offs	Ref.
Season	Division	P	W	T	L	Pts	Pos	Play-offs	Ref.
2014	USARL South	6	1	0	5	2	4th	Quarter-finals	
2015	USARL South	6	2	0	4	4	4th	South semi-finals	
2016	USARL South	6	3	0	3	6	2nd	South semi-finals	
2017	USARL South	6	3	1	2	7	2nd	South final	
2018	USARL South	6	3	0	3	6	3rd	South semi-finals	
2019	USARL South	7	3	0	4	6	2nd	South final	
2020	—N/a								
2021	USARL South	6	4	0	2	8	2nd	Champions	
2022	USARL South	6	4	0	2	8	2nd	Grand final	
2023	USARL South	6	5	0	1	10	1st	South final	
2024	Florida RL	6	2	0	4	4	3rd	—N/a	
2025	Florida RL	6	5	0	1	10	2nd	South final	
2026	Florida RL	6	6	0	0	12	1st	Champions	

== See also ==
- Rugby league in the United States
