= Washington DC Cavalry =

Rugby League Football Club in Washington DC

DC Cavalry
Club information
- Full name: Washington DC Cavalry; Rugby League Football Club
- Founded: 2020; 6 years ago

Current details
- Ground: Battleground Sports Complex (Mary Washington University)
- Coach: Ethan Ferrick
- Competition: USA Rugby League
- 2026: 2nd East Coast Conference (Northeast Division)

The Washington DC Cavalry is a rugby league football team based in Washington, D.C. who currently play in the USARL East Conference's, Northeast Division of the USA Rugby League. They play their home games at University of Mary Washington (Battleground Sports Complex).

== Current squad ==
Squad for the 2026 USARL season.

- 1.Ryan Burroughs (Fullback)
- 2.Carlos Vegerano (Wing)
- 3.Mattson Bueche (Centre)
- 4.Vincent Eura (Centre)
- 5.Benji Bangura (Wing)
- 6.Josh Davies (Five-eighth)
- 7.Will Lindsay (Halfback)
- 8.Delvin Hamlett (Prop)
- 9.Nick Houghton (Hooker)
- 10.TJ Jordan (Prop)
- 11.Nate Hart (Second-row)
- 12.Max Dacey (Second-row)
- 13.Lloyd Stephens (Lock)
- 14.Jacob Zegada (Five-eighth)
- 15.Gabe Cuprill (Five-eighth)
- 16.Chris Frazier
- 17.Steven Iulio (Second-row)
- 18.Viliame Siale (Prop)
- 19.Charbel Medlej
- 20.KJ Davis
- 21.Marcel Traynham (Centre)
- 22.Dylan Carpenter (Wing)
- 23.Chris Ferrio (Prop)
- 24.Jeremiah McClure (Second-row)
- 25.Kieran Jones (Lock)

== Notable players ==
- Daniel Vidot (former NRL player and Samoan international)
- Ryan Burroughs
- Ethan Ferrick
- Max Dacey
- Tj Jordan

== Award Winners ==
2023

- Top Try Scorer Ryan Burroughs
- Defensive Player of the Year Ethan Ferrick

Man of Steel Skylar Brownlow

2024

- Top Try Scorer Ryan Burroughs
- Defensive Player of the Year Ethan Ferrick

== See also ==
- Rugby league in the United States
