= 2014 AMNRL season =

American National Rugby League season

2014 AMNRL Season
- League: American National Rugby League
- Teams: 5

The 2014 AMNRL season is the 17th season of the American National Rugby League. The league shrank from six to five teams following the Northern Virginia Eagles movement to the USARL. The season was eventually canceled.

Teams
Team	Stadium	City, area	Season	Foundation
Aston Bulls	Sun Valley High School	Aston Township, Pennsylvania	16th season	1998
Bucks County Sharks	Falls Township Community Park	Levittown, Bucks County, Pennsylvania	16th season	1997
Connecticut Wildcats	Brian McMahon Stadium	Norwalk, Connecticut	11th season	2003
New York Raiders	Rockland Lake State Park	Rockland County, New York	12th season	2002
New York Knights	Hudson River Park	New York City, New York	16th season	1997
