= 2008 AMNRL season =

2008 American National Rugby League

The 2008 American National Rugby League season was the 11th season of the competition, the rugby league football competition for semi-professional clubs in the United States.

== Results ==
Round One
Jacksonville Axemen at Philadelphia Fight	Game Date: 5/31/08	Game Time: 12:30 pm	Game Venue: West Chester University-Farrell Stadium	Referee: Robert Irwin	Full Time Score - Jacksonville Axemen 36 def Philadelphia Fight 8	Half Time: Axemen 26 - Fight 0	Fight Try Scorers: Ryan McGough-1, Brad Kielinski-1	Fight Goals: 0	Axemen Try Scorers: Shaun Murray (2), Kenny Britt (2), Rich Alleger (2), Brent Shorten 1, Craig Howitt 1.	Axemen Goals: Rich Alleger (2)

DC Slayers at Fairfax Eagles	Game Date: 6/7/07	Game Time: 6:15 pm	Game Venue: Stratton Woods Park	Referee: Ryan McGough	Full Time Score - DC Slayers 40 def Fairfax Eagles 14	Half Time Score: Slayers 16 - Eagles 14	Eagles Try Scorers: Henry Nowell, Sean Millar, Mike Zelinski	Eagles Goals: Craig Webb (1/1), Naysan Eshraghi (0/2)	Slayers Try Scorers: Bill Weeks, Maoa Laumoli, Tonga, Robert Hilliard (2), Jaron Mclaurin, Sione and Kaki Muniafu	Slayers Goals: Tonga (4)

Aston Bulls at Bucks County Sharks	Game Date: 6/4/08	Game Time: 1 pm	Game Venue: Shark Park, Levittown, PA	Referee: David Niu	Full Time Score - Aston Bulls 66 def Bucks County Sharks 20	Half Time: Bulls 48 - Sharks 0	Bulls Try Scorers: 11 tries 3 x Liam Mulhall	Bulls Goals: 11 conversions	Sharks Try Scores: 4 tries	Sharks Goals: 2 conversions

New York Knights at Northern Raiders	Game Date: 6/7/08	Game Time: 2 pm	Game Venue: Walkill Oval	Referee: Robert Balachandran	Full Time Score - New York Knights 48 def Northern Raiders 0	Half Time: Knights 26 - Raiders 0	Knights Try Scorers:	Knights Goals:	Raiders Try Scores:	Raiders Goals:

Connecticut Wildcats at New Haven Warriors	Game Date: 6/07/08	Game Time: 2:00 pm	Game Venue: The Boulevard, New Haven	Referee: Robert Irwin	Full Time Score - Warriors 52 def Wildcats 28	Half Time: Warriors 30 - Wildcats 10	Warriors Try Scorers: Siose Muliumu -3, Ewan Robinson -2, Derek Roma -1, Amosa Lio -1, Andrew Crespi -1, Mathew Doeg -1	Warriors Goals: 8 from 9 Luke Carr

Round Two
Aston Bulls at Fairfax Eagles	Game Date: 6/14/2008	Game Time: 3 pm	Game Venue: Stratton Woods Park, Herndon, Va	Referee: Bruce Wedderburn	Full Time Score - Aston Bulls 56 def Fairfax Eagles 22	Half Time: Bulls 36 - Eagles 16	Bulls Try Scorers: 3 x Liam Mulhall	Bulls Goals: 2 x Liam Mulhall	Eagles Try Scores: Henry Nowell (1), Naysan Eshraghi (1), Michael Zelinski (1), Tim Hardmon (1)	Eagles Goals: Naysan Eshraghi (2/3), James Lewis (1/1)

New Haven Warriors at Northern Raiders	Game Date: 6/14/08	Game Time: 1 PM	Game Venue: Wallkill Airport Stadium	Referee: Sioisi	Full Time Score - New Haven Warriors 76 def Northern Raiders 20	Half Time: Warriors 44 - Raiders 0	Warriors Try Scorers: Ewan Robinson -2, Ed Reed -2, Luke Carr -3, Mathew Doeg -1, Salesi Tongamoa -2, Amosa Lio -1, Adam Hamon -2	Warriors Goals: 12 from 13 Luke Carr	Raiders Try Scores:	Raiders Goals:

Jacksonville Axemen at New York Knights	Game Date: 6/14/08	Game Time: 8 pm	Game Venue: The Castle	Referee: Rob Irwin	Full Time Score - New York Knights 44 def Jacksonville Axemen 32	Half Time: Knights 20 - Axemen 12	Knights Try Scorers:	Knights Goals:	Axemen Try Scores:	Axemen Goals:

Bucks County Sharks at Philadelphia Fight	Game Date: 6/14/08	Game Time: 1pm	Game Venue: West Chester University-Farrell Stadium	Referee: Fred Neukum/Steve Williams/Justin Zadnick	Full Time Score - Bucks County Sharks 54 def Philadelphia Fight 14	Half Time: Sharks 20 - Fight 4	Fight Try Scorers: Joe Bascelli-1, Jason Beltzner-1, Chris Pettine-1	Fight Goals: Ryan McGough (1/2)	Sharks Try Scorers: Steve Thompson (3), Nick Conklin (2), Vaisa Korisetta (2), Zac Padgett, Sal Raniello, Phil Shipos	Sharks Goals: Shipos 5/7, Thompson 2/3

Round Three
New Haven Warriors at New York Knights	Game Date: 6/20/08	Game Time: 9:00 pm	Game Venue: NY, NY	Referee: Rob Irwin	Full Time Score - Warriors 38 def Knights 4	Half Time: Warriors 6 – Knights 4	Warriors Try Scorers: Siose Muliumu - 2, Luke Carr -3, Salesi Tongamoa -1, Keith Nelson -1,	Warriors Goals: 5 from 7 Luke Carr

Fairfax Eagles @ Philadelphia Fight	Game Date: 6/21/2008	Game Time: 5 pm	Game Venue: West Chester University	Referee:	Full Time Score - Fairfax Eagles 36 def Philadelphia Fight 10	Half Time: Eagles 20 - Fight 4	Eagles Try Scorers: Michael Zelinski (2), Charles Pramawat (2), Kevin Campbell (1), John Young (1), Naysan Eshraghi (1)	Eagles Goals: Naysan Eshraghi (0/1), James Lewis (4/6)	Fight Try Scorers: Dave Minarcik (1), Brad Kielinski (1)	Fight Goals: Mike Kelly (1/2)

Round Four
Jacksonville Axemen at Bucks County Sharks	Game Date: 6/28/08	Game Time: 12:00 pm	Game Venue: Shark Park, Levittown, PA	Referee: Steve Thompson	Full Time Score - Jacksonville Axemen 66 def BC Sharks 24	Half Time: Axemen 30 - Sharks 6	SharksTry Scorers: Phil Shipos 2, Dan McGovern, Ian Conklin	Sharks Goals: Shipos 4/4	Axemen Try Scorers: Simon Moate 3, Josh Jackson 3, Kenny Britt 2, Brent Shorten 2, Shaun Murray, Shane Singleton	Axemen Goals: Shorten 3/3, Rich Alleger 6/9

Round Five
Fairfax Eagles @ Bucks County Sharks	Game Date: 7/12/2008	Game Time: 1 pm	Game Venue: Shark Park, Levittown, PA Referee: Fred Koniecki	Full Time Score - Bucks County Sharks 58 def Fairfax Eagles 28	Half Time: Slayers Sharks 22 - Eagles 0	Sharks Try Scorers: Phil Shipos (2), Joe Mullen (2), Mike McKenzie (2), Sal Raniello, Zac Padgett, Steve Thompson, Chris Proctor	Sharks Goals: Thompson 9/10Eagles Try Scorers: Naysan Eshraghi, Michael Zelinski, Kevin Campbell, Min Sae Chae, Tim Bucher	Eagles Goals: Naysan Eshraghi 3/4, Mike Early 1/1

New Haven Warriors at Connecticut Wildcats	Game Date: 7/12/08	Game Time: 5:00 pm	Game Venue: Brian McMahon high school	Referee: Rob Balachandran	Full Time Score - Warriors 48 def Wildcats 32	Half Time: Warriors 24 Wildcats 14	Warriors Try Scorers: Siose Muliumu (3), Derrick Roma (3), Ewan Robinson (3)	Warriors Goals: Luke Carr (6)

Round 6

Round 7
Fairfax Eagles @ Philadelphia Fight

Aston Bulls vs New York Knights

Game Date: 7/26/2008

Game Time: 2 pm

Game Venue: Dealy Field, War at the Shore

Referee:

Full Time Score - Fairfax Eagles 34 def Philadelphia Fight 24
Aston bulls 54 - New York knights 18

2 x Liam Mulhall

Half Time: Eagles - Fight 14 - Eagles 10

Eagles Try Scorers: Michael Zelinski (1), Henry Nowell (1), Naysan Eshraghi (1), Kevin Campbell (2), James Lewis (1), Joey Tropea (1)

Eagles Goals: Naysan Eshraghi (1/2), James Lewis (2/5)
Bulls Goals

2x Liam Mulhall

Fairfax Eagles @ DC Slayers	Game Date: 7/26/2008	Game Time: 5 pm	Game Venue: Dealy Field, War at the Shore	Referee: Robert Balachandran	Full Time Score - DC Slayers 28 def Fairfax Eagles 18	Half Time: Eagles 18 - Slayers 6	Eagles Try Scorers: Michael Zelinski (1), John Young (2), James Lewis (1)	Eagles Goals: Naysan Eshraghi (1/2), James Lewis (0/1), Tim Bucher (0/1)

== Final ==
The New Haven Warriors won the grand final 50-18 against Aston DSC Bulls the point scorers were;

New Haven Warriors 50

Tries: Doeg (4), Carr (2), Roma, Giroux, Robinson

Cons: Carr 7/9

Aston Bulls 18

Tries: Tulio, Stelluti, Stauffer

Cons: Wards 3/3

== The 2008 Ladder ==
Aston DSC Bulls

New Haven Warriors

Jacksonville Axemen

Connecticut Wildcats

New York Knights

Washington D.C. Slayers

Fairfax Eagles

Bucks County Sharks

Philadelphia Fight

Northern Raiders
