= 2007 AMNRL season =

2007 American National Rugby League
- Teams: 10
- Premiers: Connecticut Wildcats
- Minor premiers: Connecticut Wildcats

The 2007 American National Rugby League season was the tenth annual American National Rugby League season of semi-professional rugby league football in North America. The season began on June 2, 2007 with a match between the Northern Raiders and the New York Knights, played at Pier 40 Stadium located on the Hudson River.

The 2007 competition sees ten teams participating throughout nine round of the regular season, followed by the top six teams qualifying for the AMNRL playoff series.

The championship was won by the Connecticut Wildcats, who defeated the Aston DSC Bulls 20-18 at Hodges Stadium in Jacksonville, North Florida.

== Pre Season ==
- A new team has been allowed to join the American National Rugby League for the 2007 season the Fairfax Eagles while one team was not granted re-admittance following on from the 2006 season being the Boston Braves.
- The Delaware Valley Mantarays club decided to merge with the Philadelphia Fight in order to form a stronger club and franchise.
- The Glen Mills Bulls club relocated to Delaware County, Pennsylvania and changed the club name to the Aston Delco Sports Club Bulls or Aston DSC Bulls, however the club staff, management and playing roster will remain the same.
- The AMNRL decided to change its format from a two conference pool system to a singular league format.

== Results ==
=== Ladder ===
| | Team | Pld | W | D | L | PF | PA | PD | Pts |
|---|---|---|---|---|---|---|---|---|---|
| 1 | Connecticut Wildcats | 9 | 9 | 0 | 0 | 396 | 135 | +261 | 18 |
| 2 | Aston DSC Bulls | 9 | 7 | 0 | 2 | 342 | 252 | +90 | 14 |
| 3 | Bucks County Sharks | 9 | 6 | 0 | 3 | 288 | 218 | +70 | 12 |
| 4 | New York Knights | 9 | 5 | 1 | 3 | 336 | 242 | +94 | 11 |
| 5 | New Haven Warriors | 9 | 4 | 1 | 4 | 260 | 192 | +68 | 9 |
| 6 | Washington D.C. Slayers | 9 | 4 | 0 | 5 | 276 | 202 | +74 | 8 |
| 7 | Jacksonville Axemen | 9 | 3 | 0 | 6 | 166 | 370 | -204 | 6 |
| 8 | Philadelphia Fight | 9 | 3 | 0 | 6 | 166 | 254 | -88 | 6 |
| 9 | Northern Raiders | 9 | 1 | 0 | 8 | 129 | 274 | -145 | 2 |
| 10 | Fairfax Eagles | 9 | 0 | 0 | 9 | 100 | 240 | -140 | 0 |

=== Championship Match ===
The 2007 Championship Grand Final match was played for the first time at a set location, being Hodges Stadium located in Jacksonville, Florida.

August 25, 2007

| Connecticut Wildcats | 20–18 | Aston DSC Bulls |
|---|---|---|
| | (Report) |

Hodges Stadium, Florida
Attendance: 2000

== See also ==
- American National Rugby League
- Rugby league in 2007
