= 2010 AMNRL season =

2010 AMNRL Season
- League: AMNRL
- Teams: 11
- Total attendance: 22,300
- Broadcast partners: (United States) America One JAXEAXETV

2010 Season champs
- Jacksonville Axemen
- Runners-up: New Haven Warriors
- Man of Steel: Brent Shorten

The 2010 American National Rugby League season was the 13th season of the AMNRL. The Pittsburgh Vipers are the newest team to enter the competition and the Bucks County Sharks have withdrawn from the competition.

== Teams ==
- Some teams will also field a 2nd team which will be played after the main game in order to give players more experience.
- The Canada national rugby league team has been invited to play in the War at the Shore only and will not feature in the regular season competition with the game set to be re-launched in Canada after years of inactivity
- A Chicago-based team (The Chicago Stockyarders) will also play in the War at the Shore with future plans to enter into the AMNRL.

AMNRL Teams
Team	Stadium	City/Area	Foundation Year
Aston DSC Bulls	Aston Community Field	Delaware County, Pennsylvania	2007
Boston 13s RLFC	Moakley Stadium	Boston, Massachusetts	2009
Connecticut Wildcats	Andrews Field	Norwalk, Connecticut	2003
Fairfax Eagles	Stratton Woods Park	Falls Church, Virginia	2007
Jacksonville Axemen	Hodges Stadium	Jacksonville, Florida	2006
New Haven Warriors	Ken Strong Stadium	New Haven, Connecticut	2006
New York Knights	Hudson River Park	New York City, New York	1997
New York Raiders	Walkill Airport Rugby Field	Essex County, New York	2002
Philadelphia Fight	A.A. Garthwaite Stadium	Conshohocken, Pennsylvania	1998
Pittsburgh Vipers	Founders Field	Cheswick, Pennsylvania	2010
Washington D.C. Slayers	Raoul Wallenberg Park	Washington, D.C.	2003

== Season ==
The competition starts June 5 and finishes August 28. Below indicates the Rounds and the matches.

== Round 1 ==
Week of June 5

Team	Score	Team	Score
Aston Bulls	44	Philadelphia Fight	32
Pittsburgh Vipers	20	Washington DC Slayers	0 (Washington Forfeit)
New York Knights	32	Boston 13s	14
Jacksonville Axemen	66	Fairfax Eagles	16
New Haven Warriors	48	Connecticut Wildcats	24

- Northern Raiders (Bye)

== Round 2 ==
Week of June 12

Team	Score	Team	Score
Aston Bulls	32	Washington DC Slayers	22
Fairfax Eagles	80	Pittsburgh Vipers	4
Jacksonville Axemen	34	Boston 13s	16
Philadelphia Fight	76	Northern Raiders	0
New Haven Warriors	34	New York Knights	25

- Connecticut Wildcats (Bye)

== Round 3 ==
Week of June 19

Team	Score	Team	Score
Philadelphia Fight	40	Washington DC Slayers	26
New York Knights	34	Connecticut Wildcats	20
Boston 13s	48	Pittsburgh Vipers	16
Aston Bulls	96	Fairfax Eagles	22
New Haven Warriors	74	Northern Raiders	5

- Jacksonville Axemen (Bye)

== Round 4 ==
Week of June 26

Team	Score	Team	Score
Jacksonville Axemen	26	Aston Bulls	6
Connecticut Wildcats	50	Northern Raiders	10
Washington DC Slayer	54	Pittsburgh Vipers	14
New Haven Warriors	30	Boston 13s	18

- Philadelphia Fight (Bye)
- Fairfax Eagles (Bye)
- New York Knights (Bye)

== Weekend of July 4 ==
- Open for holiday and potential makeup date

== Round 5 ==
Week of July 10

Team	Score	Team	Score
Jacksonville Axemen	34	New York Knights	8
Fairfax Eagles	80	Pittsburgh Vipers	18
Connecticut Wildcats	48	Northern Raiders	8
Aston Bulls	28	Philadelphia Fight	16

- Washington DC Slayers (Bye)
- Boston 13s (Bye)
- New Haven Warriors (Bye)

== Round 6 ==
Week of July 17

Team	Score	Team	Score
Jacksonville Axemen	30	Philadelphia Fight	10
Pittsburgh Vipers	-	New York Knights	(Forfeit)
Boston 13s	50	Connecticut Wildcats	30
Washington DC Slayers	38	Fairfax Eagles	30
New Haven Warriors	84	Northern Raiders	6

- Aston Bulls (Bye)

== Round 7 ==
Week of July 24

Team	Score	Team	Score
Washington DC Slayers	24	Fairfax Eagles	16
New Haven Warriors	80	Connecticut Wildcats	14
Philadelphia Fight	36	Boston 13s	24
Jacksonville Axemen	42	Aston Bulls	26
New York Knights	20	Northern Raiders	0 (Forfeit)

- New York faced Bucks County Sharks in the Washington Crossing Challenge replacement game New York defeated Bucks County 46-12.
- Pittsburgh Vipers (bye)

== War at the Shore ==
Week of July 31 Robert Preston Memorial Rugby League Challenge Cup The new look War at the Shore event has been won by the DC Internationals, a select side from Washington.

The Internationals beat the New York Knights 10-0 in the championship final Saturday evening in Sea Isle City, NJ.

The American National Rugby League's showpiece event had a vastly different look about it this year with teams playing abbreviated games as part of a festival-like set up.

The New York Knights, Aston Bulls, Philadelphia Fight, Boston 13s and Connecticut Wildcats of the AMNRL were joined by select sides from Washington DC and New England, as well as a Canadian representative team.

The DC Internationals were a combination of the Washington DC Slayers and Fairfax Eagles, while the New England Immortals were composed of players from the 13s, Wildcats and New Haven Warriors. The Canadian Mounties represented teams north of the border.

Matches in the championship bracket consisted of two 15-minutes halves and games in the elimination bracket were 10-minute halves.

In excess of 2000 people were attracted to the event. There were fan activities all day long, plus music, prizes and giveaways to keep spectators entertained.

In the championship final, the Internationals scored two tries and kept their own line intact in a decider that was very much a back and forth contest.

The Knights opened the match in solid fashion by controlling the ball, but they couldn't crack the opposition's line. After absorbing the early pressure, the Internationals got the opening score when Tom O'Connor (DC Slayers) kicked ahead on the last tackle, regathered the ball and went in for the try.

The teams went to the interval with the Internationals leading 4-0. The second frame was much the same with both sides threatening to score, both putting up goal line stands and both being held up over the line.

As time was about to expire, Michael Chapman (DC Slayers) sealed the deal with a try for the Internationals. It was converted by Reece Blayney (Fairfax Eagles) and the 'Robert Preston Memorial Rugby League Challenge Cup' was won for the very first time.

John Young (Fairfax Eagles) was named War at the Shore MVP. Young scored several tries and had a stellar day.

"It was the Australians who helped us win. They played their brand of rugby from back home," Internationals manager Rich Nolte told ARN.

"For the most part, the Americans on the team were in the forwards and they put in some excellent work, especially on defense."

From New York's standpoint mistakes at inopportune times proved costly.

"All in all it was an exciting game," said Knights CEO Rob Ballachandran.

"It was really good for us because we were able to get a lot of our young reserve guys into the mix and with the playoffs starting in a couple of weeks, the team bonding was important."

In the Rugby League Sevens Exhibition game, the Northern Raiders beat the Chicago Stockyarders select side 18-10.

== Open Round ==
Week of August 31

- Team Preparations for Playoffs

== Play-Offs ==
Weeks of August 14, 21, 28

- 8 Teams Seeded according to points earned during regular season. Lowest seed always plays highest seed.

== Round 1 (Play-Offs) ==
August 14

Team	Score	Team	Score
New Haven Warriors	80	Fairfax Eagles	26
Jacksonville Axemen	-	Connecticut Wildcats	(Forfeit)
Aston Bulls	46	Philadelphia Fight	30
New York Knights	28	Washington DC Slayers	22

== Round 2 (Play-Offs) ==
Team	Score	Team	Score
New Haven Warriors	42	New York Knights	18
Jacksonville Axemen	46	Aston Bulls	4

== Grand final ==
Pre game matches:

- Red vs Blue (United States national rugby league team trial selection)
- Philadelphia Fight vs Chicago Stockyarders (7s exhibition game)
- Ladies Eagletag

28 August 2010

Jacksonville Axemen	34 – 14	New Haven Warriors
Tries: Kenny Britt; Zach Matta; Brent Shorten (3); Darryl Howland; Goals: Brent Shorten (4); Darryl Howland	(Report)	Tries: Siose Muliumu (2); Damien O'Malveney; Goals: Roy Leoni

AA Garthwaite Stadium, Conshohocken, Pennsylvania
Attendance: 1,300
Referee: Chris Sutton
Player of the Match: Brent Shorten

== Notable moments ==
April

- 20th
- Former Parramatta Eels and St. George Illawarra Dragons NRL player Daniel Wagon arrived in the United States in May to play for the Aston Bulls.

June

- 12th
- Former NRL players Tony Duggan and Jye Mullane signed with the New Haven Warriors after finishing stints in France.

== Preseason ==
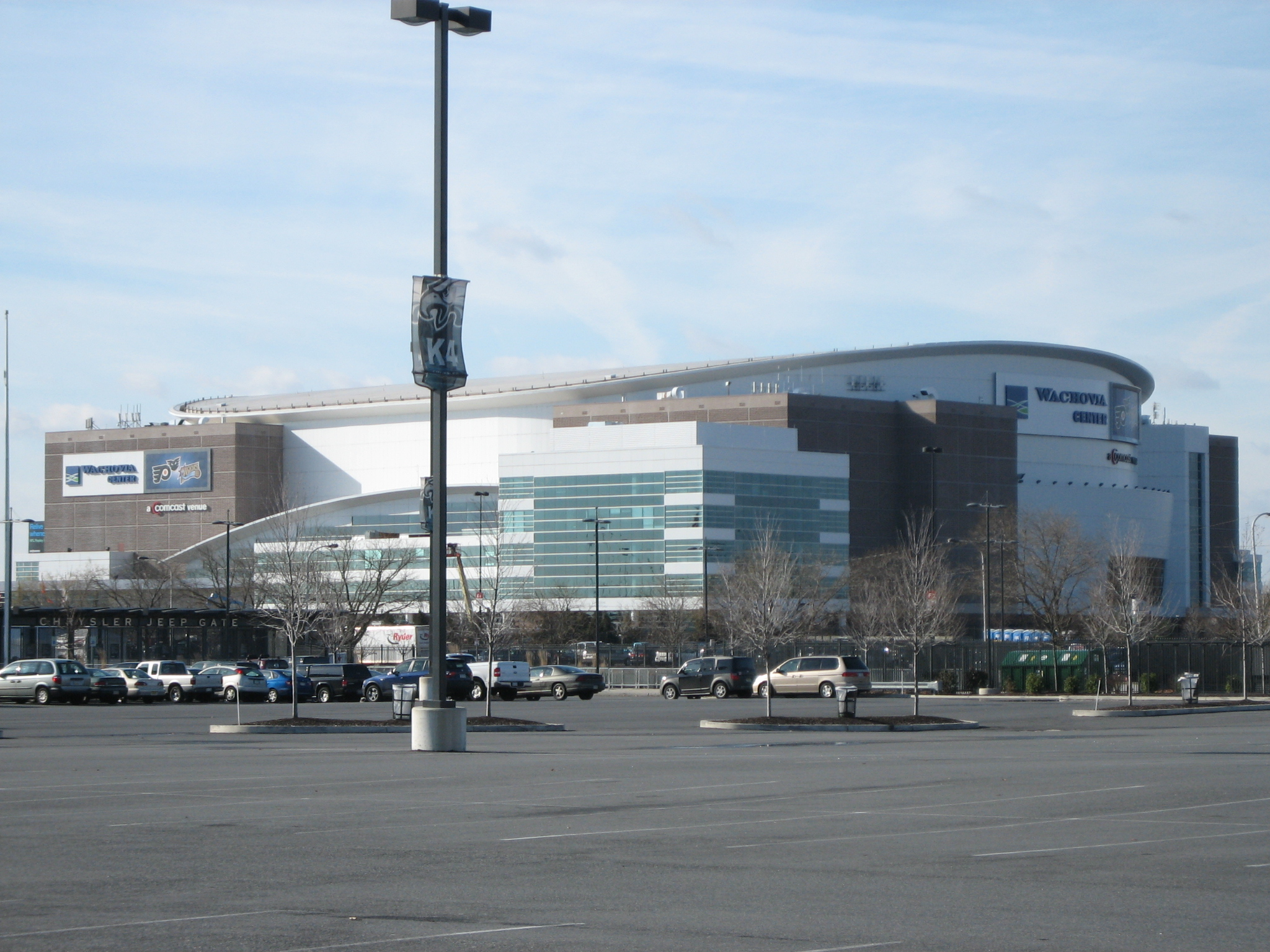
Wachovia Center

A preseason match between the Philadelphia Fight and the Fairfax Eagles was played at the Wachovia Center (the first time a rugby league game was played there) in front of 10,100 fans in a bid to increase awareness of rugby league in the United States and to help raise spectator numbers for the Philadelphia Wings lacrosse team. The score was a nil all draw.

== Television ==
America One are currently showing National Rugby League matches from Australia and New Zealand as well as Super League matches from Europe. There are plans to show the AMNRL Grand Final on the America One channel as well as US Tomahawks (the United States national rugby league team) matches. JAXAXE TV streams Jacksonville Axemen home games live on JAXAXE TV through their website.

== Standings ==
Final standings (unofficial):

Team	Wins	Loss	Points
New Haven Warriors	6	0	30 pts
Jacksonville Axemen	6	0	30 pts
Aston Bulls	4	2	21 pts
New York Knights	4	2	21 pts
Washington DC Slayers	3	3	17 pts
Philadelphia Fight	3	3	16 pts
Connecticut Wildcats	2	4	13 pts
Fairfax Eagles	2	4	12 pts
Boston 13s	2	4	11 pts
Pittsburgh Vipers	1	5	5 pts
Northern Raiders	0	6	0 pts
