= 2012 AMNRL season =

2012 AMNRL Season
- League: American National Rugby League
- Teams: 6
- Minor premiers: New York Knights
- Broadcast partners: (United States) America One

2012 Season champs
- New York Knights
- Runners-up: Connecticut Wildcats
- Top point-scorer: Todd Fisher (154 points)
- Top try-scorer: Michael Goward (22)

The 2011 AMNRL season was the fifteenth season of the American National Rugby League and the first after the split from USA Rugby League. The New York Knights are the reigning champions.

== Background ==
After the 2011 split, which saw 7 former AMNRL teams withdraw from the competition to form the new USA Rugby League, in 2012, 5 of the 6 teams from the previous season returned. Delaware Vipers withdrew, and Northern Virginia Eagles returned to bring the competition to six. The New York Knights return as defending champions after winning the 2011 AMNRL Grand Final over the Connecticut Wildcats.

The 2012 season was buoyed by the national team's success on the international stage — coached by Matthew Elliott, the Tomahawks had qualified for the 2013 Rugby League World Cup, beating Jamaica and South Africa the previous October.

== Teams ==
AMNRL teams
Team	Stadium	City/Area	Foundation Year	Championships
Aston Bulls	Sun Valley High School	Aston Township, Pennsylvania	1998	6 (as Glen Mills Bulls)
Bucks County Sharks	Falls Township Community Park	Levittown, Bucks County, Pennsylvania	1997	0
Connecticut Wildcats	Brian McMahon Stadium	Norwalk, Connecticut	2003	3 - 2003,2006,2007
New York Knights	Hudson River Park	New York City, New York	1997	3 - 2002,2009, 2011
Northern Raiders	Rockland County, NY	Essex County, New York	2002	0
Northern Virginia Eagles	Northern Fauquier Community Field	Marshall, Virginia	2007	0

== Regular season ==
=== Week 1 ===
Home	Score	Away	Match information
Home	Score	Away	Date and time	Venue	Ref
Aston Bulls	18 - 38	Connecticut Wildcats	Saturday, June 2	Andrews Field
Northern Raiders	54 - 24	Bucks County Sharks	Saturday, June 2	Andrews Field
Northern Virginia Eagles	0 - 78	New York Knights	Saturday, June 2	Northern Fauquier Community Field

=== Week 2 ===
Home	Score	Away	Match information
Home	Score	Away	Date and time	Venue	Ref
Connecticut Wildcats	22 - 26	New York Knights	Saturday June 9	Staples High School
Bucks County Sharks	28 - 8	Northern Raiders	Saturday June 9	Buchanan Elementary School
Aston Bulls	54 - 4	Northern Virginia Eagles	Saturday June 9	Brandywine Rugby Field

=== Week 3 ===
Home	Score	Away	Match information
Home	Score	Away	Date and time	Venue	Ref
New York Knights	34 - 36	Aston Bulls	Saturday June 16	Pier 40 Hudson River Park
Bucks County Sharks	20 - 0	Northern Virginia Eagles	Saturday June 16	Buchanan Elementary School
Connecticut Wildcats	42 - 20	Northern Raiders	Saturday June 16	NY Military Academy

=== Week 4 ===
Home	Score	Away	Match information
Home	Score	Away	Date and time	Venue	Ref
Bucks County Sharks	12 - 30	New York Knights	Friday June 22	Falls Township Community Park
Northern Virginia Eagles	34 - 74	Connecticut Wildcats	Saturday June 23	Northern Fauquier Community Field
Northern Raiders	22 - 42	Aston Bulls	Saturday June 23	Andrews Field

=== Week 5 ===
Home	Score	Away	Match information
Home	Score	Away	Date and time	Venue	Ref
New York Knights	44 - 28	Connecticut Wildcats	Friday June 29	Pier 40 Hudson River Park
Aston Bulls	52 - 30	Bucks County Sharks	Saturday June 30	Brandywine Rugby Field
Northern Virginia Eagles	12 - 86	Northern Raiders	Saturday June 30	Northern Fauquier Community Field

=== Week 6 ===
Home	Score	Away	Match information
Home	Score	Away	Date and time	Venue	Ref
Northern Virginia Eagles	12 - 86	Bucks County Sharks	Saturday July 14	Northern Fauquier Community Field
New York Knights	48 -18	Northern Raiders	Saturday July 14	Pier 40 Hudson River Park
Aston Bulls	60 - 30	Connecticut Wildcats	Saturday July 14	Brandywine Rugby Field

=== War At The Shore XV - Sea Isle City, NJ ===
Home	Score	Away	Match information
Home	Score	Away	Date and time	Venue	Ref
Northern Raiders	26 - 56	Aston Bulls	Saturday July 28	Dealy Field
New York Knights	54 - 0	Northern Virginia Eagles	Saturday July 28	Dealy Field
Bucks County Sharks	22 - 42	Connecticut Wildcats	Saturday July 28	Dealy Field

=== Standings ===
AMNRL Standings
Competition Points Breakdown: Win = 4 points Draw = 2 points, Loss = 0 points, Loss under 6 = 1 point, 4+ tries = 1 point
Pos	Team	Pld	W	D	L	PF	PA	PD	Pts	Qualification
1	New York Knights	7	6	0	1	314	118	+196	32	Minor Premiers & Semi-finals
2	Aston Bulls	7	6	0	1	320	184	+136	31	Qualifying Finals
3	Connecticut Wildcats	7	4	0	3	276	224	+52	24	Qualifying Finals
4	Bucks County Sharks	7	3	0	4	222	168	+54	18	Qualifying Finals
5	Northern Raiders	7	2	0	5	236	254	-18	13	Qualifying Finals
6	Northern Virginia Eagles	7	0	0	7	62	452	-390	1	

== Statistics ==
=== Top points scorers ===
Rank	Player	Club	Tries	Goals	Points
1	Todd Fisher	New York Knights	12	53	154
2	Matt Walsh	Connecticut Wildcats	12	43	134
3	John Grace	Aston Bulls	4	44	104
4	Michael Goward	Connecticut Wildcats	22	0	88
5	Joel Venables	Northern Raiders	0	34	68
6	Andrew Moody	New York Knights	15	2	64
7	Mick Esdale	Northern Raiders	14	3	62
8	Zac Padgett	Bucks County Sharks	11	0	44
9	Steve Thompson	Bucks County Sharks	1	19	42
10	Kevin Wiggins	Aston Bulls	10	0	40

=== Top try scorers ===
Rank	Player	Club	Tries
1	Mike Goward	Connecticut Wildcats	22
2	Andrew Moody	New York Knights	15
3	Mick Esdale	Northern Raiders	14
4	Matt Walsh	Connecticut Wildcats	12
5	Todd Fisher	New York Knights	12
6	Zac Padgett	Bucks County Sharks	11
7	Kevin Wiggins	Aston Bulls	10
8	Marc Webb	Northern Raiders	9
9	Fitzy Adams	New York Knights	9
10	Al Valentin	Aston Bulls	8
10	Louis Tulio	Aston Bulls	8

== Postseason ==
=== Qualifying Finals ===
Home	Score	Away	Match information
Home	Score	Away	Date and time	Venue	Ref
Aston Bulls	30 - 20	Northern Raiders	Saturday August 4	Brandywine Rugby Field
Connecticut Wildcats	44 - 36	Bucks County Sharks	Saturday August 4	Staples High School

=== Semi Finals ===
Home	Score	Away	Match information
Home	Score	Away	Date and time	Venue	Ref
New York Knights	52 - 4	Bucks County Sharks	Saturday August 11	Pier 40 Hudson River Park
Aston Bulls	32 - 38	Connecticut Wildcats	Brandywine Rugby Field

=== AMNRL Cup Final XV ===
Home	Score	Away	Match information
Home	Score	Away	Date and time	Venue	Ref
New York Knights	60 - 40	Connecticut Wildcats	Saturday August 18	Fairfield Ludlowe High School
