= 2009 AMNRL season =

2008 American National Rugby League

The 2009 AMNRL season was the 12th season of the American National Rugby League (AMNRL). The Boston Thirteens joined the league as an expansion team, bringing the number of teams to eleven. The New York Knights won the Grand Final, defeating the Jacksonville Axemen.

== Results ==
Bucks County Sharks defeated Aston DSC Bulls 22-20

Philadelphia Fight defeated Fairfax Eagles 20-12

Boston 13s defeated Northern Raiders 64-7

Jacksonville Axemen defeated Washington DC Slayers 44-24

Jacksonville Axemen defeated Boston 13s 46-16

New Haven Warriors defeated Connecticut Wildcats 20-0(forfeit)

New York Knights defeated Washington DC Slayers 64-8

New York Knights defeated Aston DSC Bulls 40-20

New Haven Warriors defeated Washington DC Slayers 44-12

Philadelphia Fight defeated Bucks County Sharks 32-12

Jacksonville Axemen defeated Fairfax Eagles 56-4

Jacksonville Axemen defeated New York Knights 28-18

New Haven Warriors defeated Boston 13s 56-4

Fairfax Eagles defeated Northern Raiders 20-10(forfeit)

New York Knights defeated Northern Raiders 32-4

Jacksonville Axemen defeated New Haven Warriors 46-24

Boston 13s defeated Aston DSC Bulls 74-42

Fairfax Eagles defeated Connecticut Wildcats 74-6

Philadelphia Fight defeated Washington DC Slayers 72-16

== Standings ==
Team	Wins	Loss	Points
Jacksonville Axemen	5	0	25 pts
New Haven Warriors	3	1	16 pts
New York Knights	3	1	15 pts
Philadelphia Fight	3	0	15 pts
Fairfax Eagles	2	2	10 pts
Boston 13s	2	2	10 pts
Bucks County Sharks	1	1	5 pts
Aston DSC Bulls	0	3	4 pts
Washington DC Slayers	0	4	1 pt
Connecticut Wildcats	0	2	0 pts
Northern Raiders	0	3	0 pts
