= Chicago Stockyarders =

US semi-professional rugby league club

Club information
- Full name: Chicago Stockyarders Rugby League Football Club}
- Nickname: Yarders
- Founded: 2010; 16 years ago

Current details
- Ground: Winnemac Stadium (4,500)
- CEO: Mike Featherstone
- Coach: Mike Featherstone
- Captain: Quinn Macali / Dave "White Snake" Whitney
- Competition: Piranha Guard Development Series / Midwest Rugby League

Uniforms
Home colours

The Chicago Stockyarders are a semi-professional rugby league football team based in Chicago, Illinois. The team was established in 2010, and played two exhibition rugby league sevens games while preparing for a fuller exhibition schedule for the 2011 AMNRL season. They originally planned to join the American National Rugby League (AMNRL), however the league has since folded and plans are currently being made to join the current first grade U.S. competition, the USA Rugby League.

== History ==
In May 2006, a successful beach Rugby League 9's exhibition game was held at North Avenue Beach, Chicago between the Chicago Saints and the touring UK team Ormskirk Heelers. The Saints would be the front-runner to a planned Chicago based AMNRL team that would eventually be named the Chicago Stockyarders. In 2009 an organization named Midwest Rugby League was formed to promote rugby league in the Midwestern United States, and to operate the Stockyarders team from 2010 onwards.

The Stockyarders made their first on-field appearance on July 31, 2010, at the American National Rugby League (AMNRL)'s annual War at the Shore tournament. They played an exhibition rugby league sevens game against the Northern Raiders, which ended with an 18–10 loss for the Stockyarders. Dan Hoskin scored their first ever points with a debut try in a Man of the Match (MVP) performance. They played a second exhibition sevens game as a curtain raiser to the AMNRL Grand Final at A. A. Garthwaite Stadium in Conshohocken, Pennsylvania. Visiting Australian Kangaroo player Daniel Wagon guested for the Stockyarders in a game against the Philadelphia Fight. The Fight won the game 24–16.

In October 2010 the Stockyarders signed their first sponsor, and announced their intention to play a full exhibition schedule in the 2011 season.

The Stockyarders had been at the forefront of developing a Midwest conference concept for the AMNRL before the league folded. In 2012, the Western Storm, Iowa City Crash and Lewis University all played games against the Stockyarders at Winnemac Park Chicago under this format resulting in a record of 1–2 for the Stockyarders. The same venue also hosted the AMNRL Midwest sevens tournament in Chicago which was won by an Irish Exiles team. After a year in hiatus the Stockyarders and Midwest Rugby League revived this conference concept with the AMNRL Midwest Piranha Guard development series which will saw games played against Elmhurst college and Lewis University in spring 2014 and the Stockyarders finishing with a 2–0 record.

The team are currently in talks to enter the USA Rugby League, the US's top level rugby league competition.

== See also ==
- Rugby league in the United States
