= 2011 AMNRL season =

Fourteenth season of American National Rugby League

2011 AMNRL Season
- League: American National Rugby League
- Teams: 6
- Broadcast partners: (United States) America One

2010 Season champs
- Jacksonville Axemen
- Runners-up: New Haven Warriors
- Man of Steel: Brent Shorten

The 2011 AMNRL season was the fourteenth season of the American National Rugby League. The Jacksonville Axemen are the reigning champions. Prior to the season seven AMNRL teams withdrew from the league to form the new USA Rugby League.

The New York Knights defeated the Connecticut Wildcats in the league's Grand Final on August 20, 2011.

== Background ==
Prior to the season the AMNRL announced its intentions to expand to such places as Chicago, the West Coast of the United States, and the Southeastern United States. Additionally, the Bucks County Sharks, who had suspended operations for the 2010 season, announced that they would be resuming play for 2011. However, on January 12, 2011, seven former AMNRL teams announced they were withdrawing from the competition to form the new USA Rugby League. The AMNRL added a sixth team, the Delaware Vipers, ostensibly based in Delaware, who had such a shaky season that they were dubbed the "Vapours" by some in the league.

== Teams ==
AMNRL teams
Team	Stadium	City/Area	Foundation Year	Championships
Aston Bulls	Sun Valley High School	Aston Township, Pennsylvania	1998	6 (as Glen Mills Bulls)
Bucks County Sharks	Falls Township Community Park	Levittown, Bucks County, Pennsylvania	1997	0
Connecticut Wildcats	Brian McMahon Stadium	Norwalk, Connecticut	2003	3- 2003,2006,2007
Delaware Vipers	Baynard Stadium	Wilmington, Delaware	2011	0
New York Knights	Hudson River Park	New York City, New York	1997	2- 2002,2009
New York Raiders	Rockland County, NY	Essex County, New York	2002	0
