= Reece Blayney =

Australian rugby league footballer

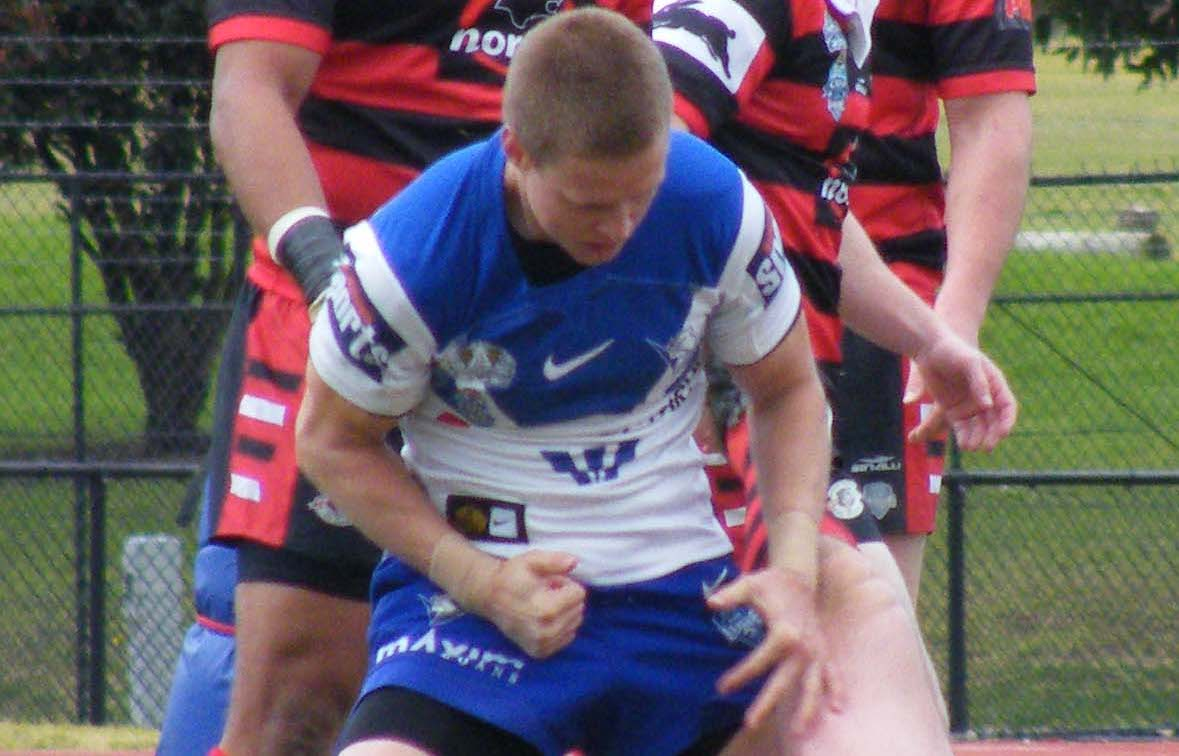

Personal information
- Born: 24 July 1985 (age 39); Cronulla, New South Wales, Australia
- Height: 184 cm (6 ft 0 in)
- Weight: 84 kg (13 st 3 lb)

Playing information
- Position: Halfback, Five-eighth
Club
Years	Team	Pld	T	G	FG	P
2008	Canterbury-Bankstown	2	0	0	0	0
2009–10	AS Carcassonne	0	0	0	0	0
2010–11	Fairfax Eagles	0	0	0	0	0
	Total	2	0	0	0	0
- Source: As of 30 October 2023

Reece Blayney (born 24 July 1985) is an Australian former professional rugby league footballer who last played for the Wynnum Manly Seagulls in the Queensland Cup competition. Blayney previously played for teams such as the Canterbury-Bankstown in Australia's National Rugby League (NRL), AS Carcassonne in France's Elite One Championship, and the Fairfax Eagles in the United States' American National Rugby League (AMNRL). He played as a halfback and five-eighth.

== Early life ==
Blayney was born in Cronulla, New South Wales and played junior footy for Gymea Gorillas.

== Playing career ==
In 2008, Blayney was signed by Canterbury in Australia's National Rugby League (NRL). Blayney made his first grade debut for Canterbury in round 23 of the 2008 NRL season against Penrith at Penrith Stadium with Canterbury losing 52–16. In round 26, he made a further appearance for the club against Canberra which ended in a 52–34 loss. Canterbury would finish the 2008 season in last place with the Wooden Spoon. Blayney also spent time in the New South Wales Premier League with the Cronulla-Sutherland Sharks and the St. George. In the 2009–2010 season, Blayney signed with AS Carcassonne in the top-flight Elite One Championship in France.

Blayney subsequently signed with the Fairfax Eagles of the American National Rugby League (AMNRL), the top competition in the United States, playing during the 2010 season. Blayney was one of the most high-profile signings in American rugby league.

For the 2011 season, Blayney signed with the Wynnum Manly Seagulls in Australia's Queensland Cup competition. Blayney played at five-eighth in Wynnum-Manly's 2011 Queensland Cup grand final victory over the Tweed Heads Seagulls.
