= 2006 AMNRL season =

2006 American National Rugby League
- Teams: 11
- Premiers: Connecticut Wildcats (2nd title)
- Minor premiers: Glen Mills Bulls (6th title)

The 2006 American National Rugby League season was the ninth annual American National Rugby League (AMNRL) season, and the 26th since the first season of semi-professional rugby league began in North America. The season began on May 17, 2006 with a match between defending premiers Glen Mills Bulls and the Philadelphia Fight, played at Jack Pearson Stadium. The same venue hosted the Grand Final between the Connecticut Wildcats and Glen Mills Bulls on August 19, 2006 in front of a crowd of 2,500.

Three expansion teams, the Jacksonville Axemen, the New Haven Warriors, and the Boston Braves joined the AMNRL for the 2006 season. With these additions, there were eleven teams that participated throughout the ten rounds of the regular season. After the regular season concluded, six of these teams qualified for the first week of the playoff series, with the Connecticut Wildcats victors in the Grand Final, securing their second championship title.

== Pre-season ==
- Three new teams entered the competition for the 2006 season which took the number of teams in the American National Rugby League to eleven. These teams were the Jacksonville Axemen, Boston Braves (whom were originally called the Boston Wolfhounds), and the New Haven Warriors. It was originally believed that a team from Chicago would also enter the competition but the AMNRL turned down their application.

== Regular season results ==
=== Ladder ===
	Team	Pld	W	D	L	B	PF	PA	PD	Pts
1	Glen Mills Bulls									35
2	Jacksonville Axemen									34
3	New Jersey Sharks									32
4	Connecticut Wildcats									32
5	Washington D.C. Slayers									32
6	New York Knights									32
7	New Haven Warriors									30
8	Northern Raiders									28
9	Philadelphia Fight									26
10	Delaware Valley Mantarays									24
11	Boston Braves									24

=== Playoffs ===
==== Week 1 ====
August 5, 2006

Connecticut Wildcats	20–0	Washington D.C. Slayers

Jack Casagrande Stadium, Norwalk, Connecticut
Referee: John Ryan

August 5, 2006

New York Knights	26–22	New Haven Warriors

Pier 40, Hudson River Park, New York City
Referee: Benjamin Kelly

August 5, 2006

New Jersey Sharks	50–24	Jacksonville Axemen
Phil Shipos (18), Steve Thompson (12), Zac Padgett (8), G. Mendez (4), Jim Sweeney (4), Justin Zadnick (4)		Will Fletcher (8), Dan Van Dellen (8), Perry Vaught (8)

Shark Park, Levittown, Pennsylvania
Referee: Ryan McGough

==== Week 2 ====
August 12, 2006

Connecticut Wildcats	54–6	New York Knights
Damien O’Malvaney (16), Steve Annunziato (12), Nathan Hollingsworth (10)Danny Bull (4), Brent Griffiths (4), Doug Griffiths (4), Mike McGeachy (4)	(Report)	Adam Nable (6)

Jack Casagrande Stadium, Norwalk, Connecticut
Referee: Ben Wards

August 12, 2006

Glen Mills Bulls	54–18	New Jersey Sharks
	(Report)

Jack Pearson Stadium, Pennsylvania
Referee: Ryan McGough

=== Championship Match ===
The season culminated on August 19, 2006, with the 4th placed Connecticut Wildcats defeating the minor premiers Glen Mills Bulls 36-28 in the Grand Final Championship Match in front of 2,500 people at Jack Pearson Stadium in Concordville, Pennsylvania. The victory was Connecticut's second premiership in successive years.

August 19, 2006

Glen Mills Bulls	28–36	Connecticut Wildcats
	(Report)

Jack Pearson Stadium, Pennsylvania
Attendance: 2,500
Referee: Ryan McGough

== See also ==
- American National Rugby League
- Rugby league in 2006
