= Chad Eagle =

New Zealand rugby league and union player

Personal information
- Born: 24 August 1971 (age 54) Auckland, New Zealand
- Height: 196 cm (6 ft 5 in)
- Weight: 117 kg (18 st 6 lb; 258 lb)

Playing information

Rugby union
Club
Years	Team	Pld	T	G	FG	P
	Bristol RFC
	London Irish
	Total	0	0	0	0	0

Rugby league
- Position: Prop, Lock
Club
Years	Team	Pld	T	G	FG	P
2008	New Haven Warriors

Chad Eagle (born 24 August 1971) is a New Zealand rugby league footballer who formerly played for the New Haven Warriors in the AMNRL. His position is at lock. He previously played professional rugby union in England for Bristol RFC and London Irish.
