= Siose Muliumu =

US international rugby league footballer

Personal information
- Born: 26 April 1976 (age 50) Auckland, New Zealand
- Height: 187 cm (6 ft 2 in)
- Weight: 107 kg (16 st 12 lb)

Playing information
- Position: Prop
Club
Years	Team	Pld	T	G	FG	P
1998	Whitehaven RLFC		1			4
2004	Limoux Grizzlies
2013	Southampton Dragons
	Total	0	1	0	0	4
Representative
Years	Team	Pld	T	G	FG	P
2009–13	United States	2	0	0	0	0

Siose Muliumu (born 26 April 1976 in Auckland, New Zealand) is a New Zealand rugby league player who played professionally for Whitehaven and later represented the United States.

== Early years ==
Muliumu attended St Paul's College in Auckland and played for the City-Pt Chev team in the Auckland Rugby League competition. Muliumu represented the Junior Kiwis in 1994 and 1995.

== Playing career ==
Muliumu joined Whitehaven in England while they were being coached by New Zealander Stan Martin. He is regarded as one of Whitehaven's top forwards in the last twenty years.

He played for the Wentworthville Magpies in the 2006 Jim Beam Cup.

Muliumu then joined the New Haven Warriors in the AMNRL where he was the competitions MVP in 2008. He represented the United States at the 2009 Atlantic Cup and was the Rugby League International Federation's 2009 USA player of the year. He scored two tries for the Warriors in the 2010 AMNRL Grand Final. In 2013 he played for the Southampton Dragons in the AMNRL.
