= Cunz =

Cunz is a surname. Notable people with the surname include:

- Curtis Cunz, American rugby league player and team owner
- Dieter Cunz (1910–1969), German émigré professor of German language and literature
- Martha Cunz (1876–1961), Swiss printmaker

== See also ==
- Bunz (disambiguation)
- Munz
