= Bunz =

Bunz may refer to:

- Dan Bunz (born 1955), American football player
- Mercedes Bunz (born 1971), German art historian, philosopher, and journalist
- Bunz Trading Zone Toronto online community and company

== See also ==
- Budz
- Cunz
