= 2007 in rugby league =

This article contains information on rugby league played in 2007. The season commenced with the World Club Challenge and concluded with the New Zealand All Golds Tour in November.

== February ==
=== 22 ===
- Sydney: The list of Australian rugby league's 100 greatest players from 1908–2007 is announced.

=== 23 ===
- Bolton, England: The 2007 World Club Challenge is won by St. Helens who defeated the Brisbane Broncos 18–14 at Reebok Stadium before 23,207.

St. Helens	18–14	Brisbane Broncos	23 February 2007 20:00 – Reebok Stadium, Bolton; Ref: Steve Clark (Australia); Attendance: 23,207
Tries: Ade Gardner (2), Paul Sculthorpe		Tries: Corey Parker, Darius Boyd	23 February 2007 20:00 – Reebok Stadium, Bolton; Ref: Steve Clark (Australia); Attendance: 23,207
Goals: Paul Sculthorpe (3)		Goals: Corey Parker (3)	23 February 2007 20:00 – Reebok Stadium, Bolton; Ref: Steve Clark (Australia); Attendance: 23,207

== March ==
- 18 – Brisbane, Australia: The Gold Coast Titans play their first ever match: a narrow 18–20 loss to the St George Illawarra Dragons at Suncorp Stadium before 42,030.

== April ==
- 20 – Brisbane, Australia: The 2007 ANZAC Test is won by Australia 30–6 against New Zealand at Suncorp Stadium before 35,241.

== May ==
3 - Coffs Harbour, Australia: In the annual City vs Country Origin match City NSW defeat Country NSW 12–6 at BCU International Stadium before a crowd of just over 8,000.

== June ==
- 13 – Sydney: The 2007 State of Origin series is wrapped up by Queensland (Australia) in game two of the series at Telstra Stadium before 76,924.

== August ==
- 8 August – Moore Park, New South Wales: The 100-year anniversary of the formation of Australia's first rugby league governing body, the New South Wales Rugby League, is commemorated.
- 18 August – Belgrade, Serbia: The 2007 European Shield ends and is won by Serbia who finished on top of the table.
- 25 August – London, England: The 2007 Challenge Cup tournament culminates in St. Helens' 30 – 8 win against Catalans Dragons in the final at Wembley Stadium before 84,241.
- 25 August – Jacksonville, USA: The 2007 AMNRL season culminates in the Connecticut Wildcats' (United States) 20–18 win against Aston DSC Bulls in the championship match.

== September ==
- 4th – Sydney: The 2007 Dally M Awards are held and Johnathan Thurston (Australia) is named NRL player of the year.
- 6th – Australia: Rugby league film The Final Winter is released.
- 9th – Auckland, New Zealand: The 2007 Bartercard Cup season culminates in the Auckland Lions' 28–4 win against Harbour League in the grand final.
- 15th – Brisbane, Australia: The 2007 Queensland Cup season culminates in the Tweed Heads Seagulls' 28–18 win against the Redcliffe Dolphins in the grand final.
- 22nd – Darwin, Australia: The 2007 Darwin Rugby League season culminates in the Litchfield Bears' 22–16 win against the University Sharks in the grand final.
- 27th – Sydney, Australia: The 9th annual Tom Brock Lecture, entitled Nothing But a Nine-Day Wonder: The founding of rugby league – Australia’s first professional code, is delivered by Sean Fagan.
- 30th – Sydney: The 2007 NRL season culminates in the minor premiers Melbourne Storm's (Australia) 34–8 win against the Manly Warringah Sea Eagles in the 2007 NRL Grand Final. On 22 April 2010, the Melbourne Storm were stripped of the 2007 and 2009 premierships and the 2006–2008 minor premierships, after Storm officials confessed to the NRL that the club had committed serious and systematic breaches of the salary cap between 2006 and 2010 by running a well-organized dual contract and bookkeeping system which concealed a total of $3.17 million in payments made to players outside of the salary cap.

== October ==
- 13 October – Manchester, England: Super League XII culminates in the Leeds Rhinos' 33–5 win against minor premiers St. Helens in the 2007 Super League Grand Final.

== November ==
- 10: Wigan, England – The Great Britain national rugby league team plays its last ever match: a 28 – 22 victory over New Zealand at JJB Stadium.
- 17 November – Paris, France: The 2007 All Golds Tour, a repeat of the first ever international rugby league tour 100 years before, ends with a New Zealand win against France.

== Test Matches ==
=== ANZAC Test ===
20 April 2007

Australia	30–6	New Zealand
Try: Hindmarsh; King; Tate; Hunt; Lockyer; Goal: Thurston (5)	Match Report	Try: Vatuvei; Goal: Marshall

Suncorp Stadium, Brisbane
Attendance: 35,241
Referee: (England) Steve Ganson
Player of the Match: Karmichael Hunt

=== Frontline Test ===
22 June 2007

Great Britain (United Kingdom)	42–14	France
Try: McGuire 10' m Burrow (2) 28' c, 50' c Langley 36' c Wild 43' m Morley 47' c Sykes 55' m Roby 67' c Goal: Sinfield (5)		Try: Grésèque (2) 20' m, 24' c Anselme 60' m Goal: Bosc

Headingley Carnegie Stadium, Leeds

=== One off Tests ===
==== Trans-Tasman Test ====
- Cameron Smith became the 67th player to captain Australia and did it in style scoring 1 try and 6 goals in Australia's 58–0 victory over New Zealand.

14 October 2007

New Zealand Kiwis	0–58	(Australia) Australian Kangaroos
		Try: Israel Folau (2); Steve Price; Greg Inglis (3); Jarryd Hayne; Brett Stewart; Greg Bird; Willie Mason; Cameron Smith; Goal: Cameron Smith (6); Kurt Gidley

Westpac Stadium, Wellington, New Zealand
Attendance: 16,681

By playing in this match, Australian three-quarter back Israel Folau became the youngest Kangaroos test player in history at 18 years and 194 days.

28 October 2007

France	46–16	Scotland
Try: Rinaldi 10'; Stacul 13'; Planas 20'; Houles 34'; Anselme 38'; Bosc 63'; Grésèque 70'; Moly 78'; Goal: Grésèque (7)		Try: Benn 27'; Nanyn 44'; Paterson 60'; Goal: Nanyn (2)

Stade Gilbert Brutus, Perpignan

28 October 2007

Wales	50–10	Papua New Guinea
Try: Joseph; Halley (2); Gibson (2); Roberts; M. James (2); Penkywicz; Lennon; Goal: Harris (5); Lennon; Hughes		Try: Moni; Kolo; Goal: Wilshere

Brewery Field, Bridgend

=== Gillette Fusion All Golds' Centenary Tour ===
20 October 2007

Northern Union (United Kingdom)	18–25	(New Zealand) All Golds
Try: McGuire (2); Clarke; Yeaman; Goal: Rooney (3)		Try: Lauitiiti (2); Eastwood; V. Anderson; Toopi; Goal: Jones (5)

Halliwell Jones Stadium, Warrington

Three points for a try, as per inaugural Test in 1907.

27 October 2007

Great Britain (United Kingdom)	20–14	New Zealand
Try: Fa'asavalu 29'; Raynor 49'; Burgess 62'; Goal: Burrow (4)		Try: Hape (2) 3', 75'; Whatuira 34'; Goal: Hohaia

Galpharm Stadium, Huddersfield

3 November 2007

Great Britain (United Kingdom)	44–0	New Zealand
Try: Peacock 2' c Pryce (2) 14' c, 77' c Raynor 39' m Wellens 50' c Gardner 56' m Burrow 63' c Senior 71' c Goal: Sinfield (5); Burrow

KC Stadium, Kingston-upon-Hull

10 November 2007

Great Britain (United Kingdom)	28–22	New Zealand
Try: Graham 32'; Senior 36'; Hodgson 40'; Burrow 44'; McGuire 54'; Goal: Burrow (4)		Try: Stanley 7', 66'; Whatuira 11'; Tuiaki 80'; Goal: Smith (3)

JJB Stadium, Wigan

17 November 2007

France	14–22	New Zealand
Try: Goal:		Try: Goal:

Paris

== Domestic Competitions ==
=== Australia ===
==== National Rugby League ====
The 2007 NRL Season will run from 16 March 2007 to 30 September 2007, with the latter date hosting the Grand Final at Sydney's Telstra Stadium.

2007 NRL season
Pos	Team	Pld	W	D	L	B	PF	PA	PD	Pts
1	Melbourne Storm	24	21	0	3	1	627	277	+350	44
2	Manly-Warringah Sea Eagles	24	18	0	6	1	597	377	+220	38
3	North Queensland Cowboys	24	15	0	9	1	547	618	−71	32
4	New Zealand Warriors	24	13	1	10	1	593	434	+159	29
5	Parramatta Eels	24	13	0	11	1	573	481	+92	28
6	Canterbury-Bankstown Bulldogs	24	12	0	12	1	575	528	+47	26
7	South Sydney Rabbitohs	24	12	0	12	1	408	399	+9	26
8	Brisbane Broncos	24	11	0	13	1	511	476	+35	24
9	Wests Tigers	24	11	0	13	1	541	561	−20	24
10	Sydney Roosters	24	10	1	13	1	445	610	−165	23
11	Cronulla-Sutherland Sharks	24	10	0	14	1	463	403	+60	22
12	Gold Coast Titans	24	10	0	14	1	409	559	−150	22
13	St George Illawarra Dragons	24	9	0	15	1	431	509	−78	20
14	Canberra Raiders	24	9	0	15	1	522	652	−130	20
15	Newcastle Knights	24	9	0	15	1	418	708	−290	20
16	Penrith Panthers	24	8	0	16	1	539	607	−68	18

==== State of Origin ====
2007 State of Origin series

=== Europe ===
==== Super League XII ====
The Super League is the top club competition in Europe. In 2007 there are eleven English teams and one French team in the 2007 season, known as Super League XII

==== Carnegie Challenge Cup ====
The Rugby League Challenge Cup is the most prestigious knock-out competition in the world of Rugby League. It features teams from across Europe including England, Scotland, Wales, France and Russia.

Catalans Dragons become the first non-English side to reach the final. They will play holders St. Helens at Wembley Stadium on 25 August.

==== UK National Leagues ====
The National Leagues kick off on 5 April. There are two divisions, and the top team in National One has the opportunity to enter SuperLeague, subject to minimum standards.
