= BTZ =

BTZ may refer to:

- BTZ black hole, named after Bañados, Teitelboim and Zanelli
- Below the zone, US Air Force program
- A defunct cryptocurrency established by Bunz Trading Zone
- Better Than Zork, parser used by Synapse Software
- Biarritz, a city in south-west France
