= New York Raiders =

New York Raiders may refer to:

- New York Golden Blades, a team in the World Hockey Association known as New York Raiders in 1972–1973
- Northern Raiders, a team in the American National Rugby League known as New York Raiders from 2010–2013
