= Erik Hollingsworth =

American former rugby league player (born 1978)

Personal information
- Full name: Erik Hollingsworth
- Born: August 23, 1978 (age 47) United States

Playing information
- Position: Fullback, Wing
Club
Years	Team	Pld	T	G	FG	P
1996–06	Glen Mills Bulls
2007–10	Connecticut
	Total	0	0	0	0	0
Representative
Years	Team	Pld	T	G	FG	P
2004–07	United States	3	0	0	0	0

Erik Hollingsworth (born August 23, 1978 in United States) is an American former rugby league player, who played for the Glen Mills Bulls and the Connecticut Wildcats. He has also represented the United States national rugby league team, as a fullback or wing.

== Playing career ==
Hollingsworth started his career at the Glen Mills Bulls in the 1990s. He earned the MVP award in the AMNRL in 2005, tied with Andrew Webster. He then went to Connecticut and retired a few years later.
