= Curtis Cunz =

US international rugby league & union player

Personal information
- Born: Curtis Cunz Sterling, Illinois, United States

Playing information

Rugby union
- Position: Center
Club
Years	Team	Pld	T	G	FG	P
	Old Blue R.F.C.

Rugby league
- Position: Second-row
Club
Years	Team	Pld	T	G	FG	P
	Connecticut Wildcats
	New York Knights
	Total	0	0	0	0	0
Representative
Years	Team	Pld	T	G	FG	P
2007–14	United States	25	4	0	0	12
- As of 7 October 2020

Curtis Cunz is an American rugby league and former rugby union player and owns the 4 time National champions Connecticut Wildcats, most recently winning the premiere in the AMNRL in 2013.

== Rugby Union ==
He is a former rugby union player for the Old Blue New York club in the USA Rugby Super League.[1] His position was center.

== Rugby League ==
He is the most capped USA rugby league player (25) of all time.[2] and was involved in their 42-10 loss to Samoa in 2007.[3] Cunz was selected to be a part of the USA Tomahawks Rugby League World Cup Squad as ambassador for the tournament. Due to a career threatening bicep tear he was asked to fulfil that roll rather than playing. Cunz was voted in by the AMNRL Board to be the president of the league in early 2014.

His position is at second-row. He is the most capped USA Tomahawks player of all time. and was involved in their 42-10 loss to Samoa in 2007.
