= Founders Field =

- Interactive map of Founders Field
- Address: 101 Eisele Road; Cheswick, PA 15024
- Coordinates: 40°34′59″N 79°51′53″W
- Owner: Pittsburgh Harlequins Rugby Football Association
- Capacity: 1,500
- Type: Multi-purpose stadium
- Surface: Natural grass
- Field size: 120 yds x 75 yds (110 m x 68 m)
- Field shape: Rectangular

Construction
- Opened: 2001

Tenants
- Current: Pittsburgh Harlequins 2001-present Steel City FC(USL2/USLW) (2015-present); Former: Pittsburgh Panthers men's soccer 2001-2010; Pittsburgh Panthers women's soccer 2001-2010; Pittsburgh Thunderbirds (UFA) 2014-2018; Pittsburgh Vipers/Sledgehammers (AMNRL/USARL) 2010-2011

Founders Field is a 1,500-seat multi-purpose stadium in Cheswick, Pennsylvania, within the Greater Pittsburgh area. The stadium is owned and operated by the Pittsburgh Harlequins Rugby Football Association

== Facilities ==
Founders Field includes two regulation-sized, natural grass rugby pitches with bleacher seating for 1,500 spectators, an 8,000 square-foot clubhouse, LED scoreboards, two video towers, and adjacent practice fields.

== Sports events ==
Built primarily for the Pittsburgh Harlequins rugby union club, the venue also hosts collegiate and high school rugby, the Steel City FC men's and women's senior teams, Gaelic football and hurling. It formerly hosted the Pittsburgh Sledgehammers rugby league team from 2010 to 2011, and the Pittsburgh Thunderbirds Ultimate frisbee team from 2014 to 2018.
