= Delaware Valley Mantarays =

US defunct rugby league club, based in Delaware Valley, Pennsylvania

Delaware Valley Mantarays, formerly Media Mantarays

Club information
- Full name: Delaware Valley Mantarays; Rugby League Football Club
- Nickname: Mantarays / Valley / Media Rugby
- Founded: 2000; 26 years ago
- Exited: 2006; 20 years ago

Former details
- Ground: Catania Park Ridley Park, Pennsylvania (1,000)
- CEO: (United States) Merrick Wetzler
- Competition: American National Rugby League
- 2006: AMNRL, 10th

The Delaware Valley Mantarays were a semi-professional rugby league football team based in the Philadelphia metropolitan area of the U.S. state of Pennsylvania. The team played for seven seasons in the American National Rugby League (AMNRL) from 2000–2006. At the conclusion of the 2006 season they merged with another AMNRL team in the Philadelphia area, the Philadelphia Fight.

The team was organized in 2000 and joined the AMNRL the following season. Originally known as the Media Mantarays, they were initially based in the Philadelphia suburb of Media, Pennsylvania. In 2004 they relocated to nearby Ridley Park, Pennsylvania, adopting the name Delaware Valley Mantarays. After the 2006 season the Mantarays and the Philadelphia Fight announced the two clubs would merge in order to build a more competitive team for the future.

== History ==
The team, then known as the Media Mantarays, was organized in 2000. They started play in the newly organized American National Rugby League (AMNRL) the following year, replacing the Pennsylvania Raiders, another Philadelphia-based team that did not make the transition from the United States Rugby League.

The team was based in the suburb of Media, Pennsylvania, and had an affiliation with the Media Rugby Football Club, a local rugby union club. Like the other clubs, in 2001 they started a team partnership with a club from Australia's National Rugby League (NRL), in this case the Parramatta Eels. With their members drawn from Media RFC, the team found some success on the field. In 2001 they played for the AMNRL championship, ultimately losing to the Glen Mills Bulls; this would be the club's only championship game. For the 2004 season they relocated to nearby Ridley Park to play at Catania Park, and changed their name to the Delaware Valley Mantarays after the Delaware Valley, the area surrounding Philadelphia. After the conclusion of the 2006 season, the Mantarays and the Philadelphia Fight announced they would be merging to establish a more competitive club the following year.

In 2015, a new Delaware club, the Delaware Black Foxes, were formed as an expansion team for the USA Rugby League.

== Uniform and colors ==
For their 2000 American National Rugby League season in 2000 the club adopted the colors of Media Rugby Football Club (white, gold and blue) but the uniforms were predominantly white and similar in style to the National Rugby League side the Parramatta Eels, with whom the club had an affiliate partnership.

== Honors ==
- AMNRL Championship titles: 0

== See also ==
- Rugby league in the United States
- List of defunct rugby league clubs in the United States
