= Milk Lines =

Toronto band

- Origin: Toronto, Ontario, Canada
- Genres: Psychedelic rock
- Years active: c. 2014-2016
- Members: Emily Bitze (guitar, vocals), Jeff Clarke (guitar, vocals), Kyle Connolly (instrumentals), Omri Gondor (drums)

Milk Lines was a Toronto, Ontario band co-led by Emily Bitze and Jeff Clarke.

== Membership and history ==
Band members included co-leaders Emily Bitze and Jeff Clarke, who both did guitar and vocals, Kyle Connolly was the instrumentalist and Omri Gondor was the drummer.

In 2014, Milk Lines performed at the music festival JAMJAM A Music + Art + Food Festival in a Forest.

== Critical reception ==
Exclaim! compared the band's sound to The Sadies, which they also described as "jangly psych-rock and smoky western". BlogTO described the band's sound as psychedelic.
