= Rugby league in the United States =

- Country: United States
- Governing body: American National Rugby League (1997–2014); USA Rugby League (2014–present)
- National team: United States
- Nickname: Hawks
- Registered players: 700 (approximately)
- Clubs: 18 (approximately)

National competitions
- USARL

Audience records
- Single match: 45,209 (March 1, 2025) Rugby League Las Vegas

While rugby league has been played in the United States since 1954, with Australia and New Zealand playing games there on their return from the Rugby League World Cup in France, serious attempts to start the sport in the United States began only in the late 1970s. The establishment of a national team and a domestic competition in the late 20th century has seen more recent progress.

The United States national rugby league team has participated in international competition since 1987. In 1998, the country's first domestic competition, the AMNRL, was launched as a semi-professional league, predominantly based in the Northeastern and Mid-Atlantic states, and affiliated to the Rugby League International Federation, the sport's world governing body. In 2011, a new domestic competition, the USARL, began.

== History ==
=== Background ===
Games related to rugby football (now rugby union) were played in the United States in the early 19th century. During this time the sports had no fixed rules, and were particularly popular in universities and college preparatory schools in the Northeastern United States. The sport of American football evolved from these intercollegiate games.

Meanwhile, in Huddersfield, England a schism developed in rugby football between those who favored strict amateurism and those who felt that players should be compensated for time taken off work to play rugby. Many Northern English industrial towns tended to be poorer, the working class players often working in industries that had long hours of manual labour for which they would not get paid for time off. Amateur status for players in these towns was therefore not just financially difficult, but also physically demanding due to the nature of their work. In 1895 this resulted in the formation of a break-away professional sport, rugby league, the rules of the two codes of rugby (union and league) would themselves diverge. The bulk of the clubs conforming to the new sport consisted of Northern English towns. Whilst the new form of rugby was taken to countries such as New Zealand, Australia, and France, American rugby continued to be played solely under rugby union rules. The sport was eclipsed by American football and was confined to California by the time of the 1920 Olympics.

In 1939, the Californian Rugby Football Union wrote to the governing body of rugby league, the Rugby Football League, to tell them they wanted to switch from rugby union and affiliate to the RFL. In June 1939, the RFL made plans to send a delegation out to California but were unable to do so due to the outbreak of World War II.

=== 1950s and 60s: Introduction ===
One of the earliest attempts to introduce rugby league to the United States was in 1953, when Mike Dimitro, a wrestling promoter and former UCLA football all star and NFL Rams player (1947 draft), was asked to organize a tour of Australasia by an American rugby league side. The team was given a huge schedule that included 26 matches against Australian and New Zealand sides. None of the 22 American players had ever played rugby league prior to the tour, and they presented themselves in American football-like attire early on in the tournament. The side won only six games as well as drawing two.

Their second match of the tour, against a Sydney side, drew a crowd of 65,453 to the Sydney Cricket Ground. After a consistent lack of competition, crowds were good but never reached the same heights. In turn, the tour did not bring any benefits to American rugby league, but Mike Dimitro did not give up, he was able to organize two exhibitions against Australia and New Zealand in California that did not turn out to be a big success. An American side also made a short tour of France in early 1954, including a match against the France national team in Paris. France beat the United States 31–0.

Mike Dimitro was still optimistic of developing the game in the United States, but his bid to host a Rugby League World Cup in the 1960s failed.

=== 1970s to 90s: Attempts to organize the sport ===
In the 1970s former American football player Mike Mayer founded the United States Rugby League with the intention of forming the country's first professional rugby league competition. Between 1976 and 1978, Mayer secured franchising rights from the British Rugby Football League and attempted to attract funding from British and Australian promoters to help establish a twelve-team professional competition. The proposed league would have chiefly relied on attracting American football players who could not make it in the National Football League. However, Mayer was unable to find sufficient financial backing, and the league never got off the ground.

In the 1980s interest in amateur rugby league began to grow. In 1986 a new competition, the Tri-Counties Rugby League, was established with three teams in Canada and one from the United States, the New York state-based Adirondacks club. In 1987 the Australian state teams of Queensland and New South Wales played a fourth exhibition match following the three 1987 State of Origin series matches in Long Beach, California. The result of this match was not to be included in official statistics, but in recent years the New South Wales Rugby League and media organizations based in that state have added the win to their tally. Promoters claimed the match drew 10,000 spectators, but detractors said it drew only about 7,000 and was not a financial success.

Meanwhile, Mayer had continued to promote rugby league. His efforts resulted in establishing a national team to play a match against Canada in 1987; this would be the U.S.' first international match since the 1950s. The following year he was involved in promoting an exhibition game between the English teams the Wigan Warriors and the Warrington Wolves at County Stadium in Milwaukee, Wisconsin. Wigan defeated Warrington 12–5, in front of a crowd of 17,773.

In 1991 Rugby World TV promoter John F. Morgan of Lake Placid, NY was petitioned by Rugby League Australia to bring a U.S. team to the Sydney 7s and in 1993 Morgan created the American Patriots who became a novel hit at the event. Morgan also acquired the TV rights to ARL competitions and aired them on his Rugby World TV program from 1991 to 1995. He also attempted to launch League in the U.S. and convinced the RFL to send an Ireland Team to the U.S. for St. Patrick's Day matches in 1995 and 1996. The games were staged at RFK Stadium and televised live by ESPN2 in 1995 and delayed in 1996. In 1992 former St George Dragons player David Niu moved to Philadelphia and began to introduce rugby league to the Glen Mills Schools, where he was employed as a teacher. Soon after, he was contacted by Morgan and they set about building a U.S. national team with Niu as player coach to compete in international tournaments for the first time. Morgan also hosted a few U.S.-Canada matches and a U.S.-Russia match at Kezar Stadium in San Francisco in 1996. Niu took over for Morgan after the 96 season. Under Niu's leadership the United States competed in the Super League World Nines (1996, 1997), Rugby League Emerging Nations Tournament (2000 and Victory Cup (2003, 2004) competitions.

=== 1997–2011: Formation of Super League America, the country's first governing body ===
In the mid-1990s, rugby league promoters including Australian-American Niu worked to promote the game domestically, and in 1997 the first rugby league organizing body, Super League America (later renamed America National Rugby League (AMNRL)), was formed, with Niu as its head. Super League America was recognized as the official governing body for the sport by the Rugby League International Federation, and was in charge of organizing the national team and establishing a domestic competition. The domestic competition kicked off in 1998 and was contested by six team; the Glen Mills Bulls (later the Aston Bulls), the New Jersey Sharks (later the Bucks County Sharks), the New York Broncos (later the New York Knights), the Philadelphia Bulldogs (now the Philadelphia Fight), the Boston Storm, and the Pennsylvania Raiders, with Glen Mills winning the inaugural championship. Boston and Pennsylvania later dropped out of the league, while the remaining four teams continued to play under the guidance of Super League America. In 2000, Super League America announced a reorganization; the league headquarters were moved to Jacksonville, Florida, with Jacksonville-based marketing executive Steve Gormley serving as the organization's new president. Niu would serve as CEO and maintain the northeastern branch in Philadelphia. The organization was renamed the United States Rugby League, and set its sights on expanding into the Southeastern United States and attracting British rugby league teams to Florida for training camps and international competitions. The USRL was successful in entering the U.S. national team into the Rugby League World Cup qualification process for the first time, as they participated unsuccessfully in the 2000 Rugby League World Cup qualifying tournament. However, a dispute involving the British Rugby Football League led to financial difficulties and internal strife within the USRL.

Florida has hosted rugby league games in the past, the state was the host to 1999 North Pacific Qualification Tournament, where the U.S. beat both Japan and Canada to meet Lebanon for the right to play in the 2000 Rugby League World Cup. Orlando's ESPN Wide World of Sports Complex hosted the Tomahawks's test against England, for the latter's 2000 World Cup warm up game. It ended 110–0 to the away team. In 2001, Florida was also host to the Sunshine State Challenge, where the United States competed against Huddersfield, Halifax and Leeds, the miniature tournament drew a crowd of 6,700.

In 2005, an exhibition match was played in Phoenix, Arizona, to help promote rugby league outside the heartland. Plans were announced to start a west coast competition called the WAMNRL in Summer 2011.

In 2006, a new team joined the AMNRL from Boston, which played an exhibition match in 2005. Teams from New Haven (Connecticut) and Jacksonville (Florida) also joined the 2006 competition. A Chicago team is also going through various stages of development with possible inclusion in the USARL in the future.

2006 saw further expansion as the league added a first Southern club in Jacksonville Axemen, while further Northeastern clubs were added in New Haven Warriors, and the Boston Braves. The Fairfax Eagles joined the competition in 2007, and the Boston Thirteens joined in 2009. Another founder member, the Bucks County Sharks, suspended operations in 2010, while the Pittsburgh Vipers were added.

In 2009, a new professional rugby league competition, the National Rugby League USA (NRLUS), was announced. The new league was to include administrators and talent from the AMNRL, and was intended to begin play in 2010. However, as of 2010 the league had not gotten off the ground, and officials announced their hopes that play would begin in 2011, citing the late 2000s recession as a factor in the league's lack of progress.

In November 2010 the U.S. announced a strategic plan to grow the sport in the country with grass roots development, expansion and world cup qualification in sight.

=== 2011–14: USARL schism ===
The start of 2011 saw a schism in American rugby league, with seven sides leaving the AMNRL to form a new competition, the USA Rugby League. The departing clubs cited a lack of club input and stability in the administration of the AMNRL as the main reason for forming the new competition. The departing clubs were New Haven Warriors, Jacksonville Axemen, Philadelphia Fight, Boston Thirteens, Pittsburgh Sledgehammers, Washington DC Slayers and Fairfax Eagles. The New Jersey Turnpike Titans and Rhode Island Rebellion were new teams that came into being as a result of the USA Rugby League's formation and served as founding clubs to the new competition.

In retribution, the AMNRL used its position as the RLIF sanctioned U.S. body to overlook any USARL affiliated players from selection for U.S. national representative football. This enticed several players to abandon their local USARL club in the hope of representing the national team, such as Apple Pope.

2011 saw the creation of the American Youth Rugby League Association. The sole concern of AYRLA is introducing the sport to American youth. Since 2011, the American Youth Rugby League Association has created and administered summer camps and clinics in addition to a Middle School Flag Competition, A U23 Tackle Competition, A Training School Program (youth prison), a U23 Representative Side dubbed the 'AYRLA Americans', and as of 2014 a High School Competition. Also AYRLA has created coaching courses that are geared for Americans and American youth. The American Youth Rugby League Association is responsible for the first American in history to be brought through a rugby league youth development program to play for a first grade side.

In 2012, the AMNRL reached a partnership agreement with Grand Prix Rugby to broadcast and finance the sport within the United States, in the lead up to the 2013 Rugby League World Cup.

=== 2014–present: AMNRL collapse and USARL control ===
During this period, the USARL looked to consolidate its domestic competition while the AMNRL struggled domestically, with only New York Knights and Connecticut Wildcats maintaining regular competition under the AMNRL banner. In 2014, the USARL announced the formation of a Southern conference, with the Atlanta Rhinos and Central Florida Warriors among participating teams, while the Brooklyn Kings RLFC joined the Northeastern conference. Meanwhile, the AMNRL competition failed to materialize in 2014 and, following the end of David Niu's long association with the sport, the AMNRL ceded their RLIF membership and folded as an organization, with the USARL being accepted as the sole governing body for the sport in November 2014 and the few remaining AMNRL teams being accepted into the USARL competition.

In 2016, the U.S. was awarded the 2025 Rugby League World Cup along with co-host, neighbors Canada. However, plans for the World Cup to be held in the U.S. and Canada were scrapped on December 4, 2018, due to financial concerns and that the location of the 2025 Rugby League World Cup would be determined by a new bidding process in 2019.

Current expansion franchises as of the 2020s include the Chicago Stockyarders and Cleveland Rugby League. The USARL as of 2021 plans to expand in all formats of the game such as Wheelchair rugby league, Masters Rugby League and Women's rugby league.

In 2021, a break-away competition was formed, the North American Rugby League (NARL). However, to date, only one match of the competition was ever played.

In 2022, The Commission for Rugby League in the United States (USARLC) was established and claimed that it had the agreement of the International Rugby League (IRL) to become the governing body for rugby league in the United States. The IRL issued a statement refuting the claim made by USARLC, stating that the IRL had had no contact with USARLC and that USARL remained the sole IRL member in the United States.

In August 2023, Australia's National Rugby League competition signed a 5-year contract to host matches at the Allegiant Stadium in Las Vegas, Nevada every March. The inaugural 2024 season event saw a double-header with the Sydney Roosters facing Brisbane Broncos and Manly-Warringah Sea Eagles taking on South Sydney Rabbitohs.

In 2026, the USARL chairman has encouraged the National Rugby League to play matches in other parts of the USA such as California and Texas to further spread the sport of rugby league. Miami has been preferred as an option due to timezone advantage and rugby league having a strong grassroots system in place in Florida.

== National competitions ==
=== AMNRL (1997–2014) ===
Tracing its origins to 1997, the American National Rugby League (AMNRL) was the United States' oldest rugby league competition. Eleven teams competed in the 2010 AMNRL season, with seven departing after the season to form the USA Rugby League, currently the only domestic rugby league competition in the United States.

Before the split and decline of the AMNRL, it had announced various plans for expansion. The Chicago Stockyarders team had announced it would be embarking on a full exhibition schedule for 2011, and had future plans to join the AMNRL. The AMNRL had also planned a four- to six-team competition for Hawaii in partnership with the Hawaii Rugby League; teams in the development were Kona, Maui, Harlequins, Spears, Islanders, and University of Hawaii. On June 10, 2011, the Utah Avalanche of Salt Lake City, Utah, announced they were joining the AMNRL as a developing team. To date, they have not yet aligned with the new USA Rugby League Other plans for a Western American National Rugby League and development in other areas had been announced at various times.

=== USARL (2011–present) ===
The USA Rugby League was announced on January 12, 2011. It was formed by seven teams formerly in the AMNRL, and became a competitor m and competition to the AMNRL. It held its inaugural season during the Summer of 2011, and in 2014 became the sole competition in the US following AMRL's collapse.

== Defunct competitions ==
=== North American Rugby League ===
The North American Rugby League (NARL) was an unsanctioned rugby league club competition in North America. At launch, the league announced fourteen teams; twelve from United States and two from Canada. An inaugural season was planned for 2021 but was deferred until 2022 due to increased health and safety needs regarding COVID-19 and insurance and travel costs. The league will now launch with six foundation teams, five from the United States and former professional Super League member club Toronto Wolfpack from Canada. The first season was supposed to kick off on May 21, 2022, but failed to do so. A pre-season game was played in June and an announced start for September for the competition with even more reduced sides. This also failed to start.

=== Championship Rugby League ===
The Championship Rugby League (CRL) was introduced in December 2022. It was not affiliated with USARL. It began play in December 2022 and played through April 2023. It ceased operations at that point.

==== Teams ====
- (California) East Palo Alto Razorbacks
- (Hawaii) Laie Rhinos
- (Nevada) Las Vegas Islanders
- (California) North Bay Warriors
- (Utah) Provo Steelers
- (California) Sacramento Immortals
- (Utah) Salt Lake City Spartans
- (California) San Francisco Savage
- Utah Saints Rugby
- Los Angeles Bandidos

=== Midwest Rugby League ===
The Midwest Rugby League (MWRL) is a rugby league long discussed competition in the Midwest United States. In 2009 an organization named Midwest Rugby League was formed to promote rugby league in the Midwestern United States, and to operate the Stockyarders team from 2010 onwards. There has been significant difficulty establishing clubs close enough to Chicago to operate regular matches.

== Participation ==
According to estimates in 2022, there were 700 rugby league players in the United States.

== Attendance ==
List of rugby league matches in the U.S. with attendance higher than 10,000
Attendance	Date	Teams	Competition	Venue	Location	Ref.
45,719	February 28, 2026	Leeds Rhinos 58–6 Hull Kingston Rovers	2026 Super League; 2026 Rugby League Las Vegas	Allegiant Stadium	Las Vegas, Nevada	
45,719	February 28, 2026	Newcastle Knights 28–18 North Queensland Cowboys	2026 NRL Round 1; 2026 Rugby League Las Vegas	Allegiant Stadium	Las Vegas, Nevada	
45,719	February 28, 2026	Canterbury-Bankstown Bulldogs 15–14 St. George Illawarra Dragons	2026 NRL Round 1; 2026 Rugby League Las Vegas	Allegiant Stadium	Las Vegas, Nevada	
45,209	March 1, 2025	Wigan Warriors 48–24 Warrington Wolves	2025 Super League; 2025 Rugby League Las Vegas	Allegiant Stadium	Las Vegas, Nevada	
45,209	March 1, 2025	Canberra Raiders 30–8 New Zealand Warriors	2025 NRL Round 1; 2025 Rugby League Las Vegas	Allegiant Stadium	Las Vegas, Nevada	
45,209	March 1, 2025	Australia 90–4 England	International Match	Allegiant Stadium	Las Vegas, Nevada	
45,209	March 1, 2025	Penrith Panthers 28–22 Cronulla-Sutherland Sharks	2025 NRL Round 1 Round 1; 2025 Rugby League Las Vegas	Allegiant Stadium	Las Vegas, Nevada	
40,746	March 2, 2024	Manly Warringah Sea Eagles 36–24 South Sydney Rabbitohs	2024 NRL Round 1 (double header) 2024 Rugby League Las Vegas	Allegiant Stadium	Las Vegas, Nevada	
40,746	March 2, 2024	Sydney Roosters 20–10 Brisbane Broncos	2024 NRL Round 1 (double header) 2024 Rugby League Las Vegas	Allegiant Stadium	Las Vegas, Nevada	
19,320	June 23, 2018	New Zealand 18–36 England	Test Match	Mile High Stadium	Denver, Colorado	
17,773	June 10, 1989	Wigan Warriors 12–5 Warrington Wolves	Pre-season Friendly	Milwaukee County Stadium	Milwaukee, Wisconsin	
12,500	January 26, 2008	South Sydney Rabbitohs 24–26 Leeds Rhinos	Pre-season Friendly	Hodges Stadium	Jacksonville, Florida	
12,349	August 6, 1987	New South Wales 30–18 Queensland	1987 State of Origin Game 4	Veterans Memorial Stadium	Long Beach, California	

== Youth Rugby league ==
In 2011 The American Youth Rugby League Association was formed as a 501(c)(3) tax exempt organization. The goals of the American Youth Rugby League Association otherwise known as AYRLA are dedicated to introducing the sport to youth throughout the United States. AYRLA has formed a partnership with Rugby League Clubs in the U.S. most Notably the Rhode Island Rebellion and the Philadelphia Fight, in efforts to launch youth competitions and clinics in schools and towns, utilizing players coaches and administrators of local club's to run the day to day programs.

The American Youth Rugby League Association have created Middle School, U23 and as of 2014 High School Competitions. Additionally AYRLA has created and assist run summer camps and clinics.

As of 2026 Florida was mentioned to have high school and youth level teams.

== Collegiate Rugby league ==
In 2026 National Collegiate Rugby formed teams to compete at the Rugby League Las Vegas 9s in the men's and women's premier division.

== See also ==
- North American Rugby League
- Comparison of American football and rugby league
- List of American rugby league champions
