= Emily Bitze =

Canadian founder and musician

Emily Frances Bitze is the Canadian founder of Bunz Trading Zone and the vocalist and guitarist in the Toronto band Milk Lines, and the bassist for Toronto band Wish.

== Early life and education ==
Bitze was born in Montreal and attended High School in Ottawa before moving back to Montreal, where she obtained her degree in fashion design. Her full name is Emily Frances Bitze.

== Career ==
After graduation, Bitze moved to Toronto to work in a vintage fashion shop While in Toronto, she founded a Facebook group that later became the Bunz Trading Zone

Bitze is a vocalist, guitarist, and co-lead of the Toronto-based, four-piece band Milk Lines. Bitze is also a bassist for the Toronto band Wish.

== Personal life ==
In the late 2010's, Bitze moved to Vancouver.
