= Pittsburgh Sledgehammers =

US semi-professional rugby league club, based in Cheswick, Pennsylvania

Club information
- Full name: Pittsburgh Sledgehammers; Rugby League Football Club
- Nickname(s): Sledgehammers, Hammers
- Colours: Black; Gold
- Founded: 2010; 16 years ago

Current details
- Ground: Founders Field Cheswick, Pennsylvania (2,500)
- Coach: (United States) Ken DeLucia
- Captain: (United States) Ken DeLucia
- Competition: USA Rugby League
- 2010: 10th

The Pittsburgh Sledgehammers are a rugby league football team based in the Pittsburgh area. They are currently confirmed to be affiliated with the new USA Rugby League. They play their games at Founders Field in Cheswick, Pennsylvania.

The club was founded as the Pittsburgh Vipers, and joined the American National Rugby League (AMNRL) as an expansion team for the 2010 season. In 2011 they were one of seven teams to depart the AMNRL to form the USA Rugby League, adopting their current name shortly thereafter. On February 18, 2011 it was announced they would serve as a "developmental" team in the new league. In June 2015, it was announced the Sledgehammers would be coming out of hiatus and participate in the USARL in the 2016 season under new management.

== History ==
The team, originally known as the Pittsburgh Vipers, was founded in 2010. They joined the American National Rugby League as an expansion team for the 2010 season, replacing the Bucks County Sharks, who had suspended operations for the year. Their first scheduled match was against the Washington, D.C. Slayers, but the Slayers were unable to travel to Pittsburgh as scheduled, which meant their first game was postponed. They played their first game in round 2 of the 2010 AMNRL season, where they lost 80–4 against the Fairfax Eagles.

In 2011 the team was one of seven teams to leave the AMNRL to form the new USA Rugby League. They changed their name to the Pittsburgh Sledgehammers shortly after. In February 2011 it was announced the Sledgehammers would be participating as a "developmental" team in the new league.

== Logo and colors ==
Their jerseys are black and gold, the traditional colors of Pittsburgh sports. Black and gold are the colors of the city's flag as well as the Pittsburgh Pirates, the Pittsburgh Steelers and the Pittsburgh Penguins.

== See also ==
- Sports in Pittsburgh
