= Northern Virginia Eagles =

US semi-professional rugby league club, based in Manassas, Virginia

Club information
- Full name: Northern Virginia Eagles
- Nickname: Eagles
- Colours: Maroon; White
- Founded: 2007; 18 years ago

Current details
- Ground: Grizzly Sports Complex, Nokesville, Virginia
- Coach: Joseph Reichert
- Manager: Phuc Vong
- Competition: USA Rugby League

The Northern Virginia Eagles were a rugby league team based in Manassas, Virginia, U.S. The club currently plays in the USA Rugby League (USARL). From 2007 to 2011 they were known as the Fairfax Eagles and were based in nearby Fairfax, Virginia.

The Fairfax Eagles were founded in 2007 as an expansion team of the American National Rugby League (AMNRL), but did not begin play until the 2008 season. They competed in the AMNRL for three years, making playoff appearances in 2009 and 2010. In January 2011 the Eagles became one of seven teams to depart from the AMNRL to form the new USA Rugby League (USARL), but the team ceased operations before the season. In 2012, new ownership announced the team, reorganized as the Northern Virginia Eagles, would return to the AMNRL for the 2012 season.

In 2014, the Northern Virginia Eagles joined the USA Rugby League (USARL). They suspended operations in 2020 due to the COVID-19 pandemic.

== History ==
The team was founded in 2007 by Steven Grant, who was club president. Based in Fairfax, Virginia, they were the AMNRL's second team to be based in the Washington, D.C. area, after the Washington, D.C. Slayers. The Eagles were originally scheduled to join the AMNRL for the 2007 season, but financial issues prevented them from competing.

The Eagles joined the AMNRL for the 2008 season. That year they ended the season with a 3-5 record, finishing 6th overall and missing the playoffs on point differential. In the 2009 season they went 5-3 and advanced to the playoffs, but were defeated by the Aston Bulls in the first round. That year they also played the New England Rugby League representative side in the 2009 Winter Exhibition, winning by a score of 50-10. In the 2010 season they went 2–4 but qualified for the playoffs, losing to the New Haven Warriors in the first round. After the season they joined with the Washington D.C. Slayers to form the DC Internationals representative side for the War at the Shore event in Sea Isle City, New Jersey. The Internationals went on to win the War at the Shore tournament, defeating the New York Knights in the final 10-0.

On January 12, 2011, the Eagles became one of seven teams to leave the AMNRL to form the new USA Rugby League. Prior to the start of the season, however, club president Steven Grant relocated due to work. The team attempted to develop a plan to continue in the USARL, but was unable to find a solution. The club announced it was ceasing operations in April 2011.

The Eagles played most home games at Stratton Woods Park in Herndon in Fairfax County, Virginia. They finished with an all-time record of 11 wins, 19 losses, and 1 draw.

On November 26, 2011, the AMNRL announced that the team, reformed as the Northern Virginia Eagles, would compete in the 2012 season. The team is scheduled to play in Manassas, Virginia and will focus on recruiting new players.

On February 28, 2014, the USA Rugby League announced that the Northern Virginia Eagles would be joining the USARL as a member club.

== Seasons ==
| Season | League | | | | | | | Play-offs | Ref. |
| Season | Division | P | W | T | L | Pts | Pos | Play-offs | Ref. |
|---|---|---|---|---|---|---|---|---|---|
| 2008 | AMNRL | 8 | 3 | 0 | 5 | ? | 6th | — | |
| 2009 | AMNRL | 8 | 5 | 0 | 3 | 25 | 4th | R1 (withdrew) | |
| 2010 | AMNRL | 6 | 2 | 0 | 4 | 12 | 8th | Quarter-finals | |
| 2011 | — | | | | | | | | |
| 2012 | AMNRL Atlantic | 7 | 0 | 0 | 7 | 1 | 6th | — | |
| 2013 | AMNRL | 6 | 3 | 0 | 3 | 16 | 4th | Semi-finals | |
| 2014 | USARL North Atlantic | 7 | 2 | 0 | 5 | 4 | 3rd | — | |
| 2015 | USARL Mid-Atlantic | 8 | 6 | 0 | 2 | 12 | 2nd | Division final | |
| 2016 | USARL Mid-Atlantic | 8 | 4 | 0 | 4 | 8 | 3rd | Round 1 | |
| 2017 | USARL North East | 8 | 4 | 0 | 4 | 8 | 4th | Round 1 | |
| 2018 | USARL North | 6 | 1 | 1 | 4 | 0 | 7th | — | |
| 2019 | USARL North | | | | | | 4th | R1 (forfeited) | |

== Honors ==
- 2009 - Winter Exhibition Winners
- 2010 - War at the Shore Champions
- 2013 - AMNRL 7s Tournament finalists

== International caps ==
- Ryan Burroughs (United States) (5)
- Bryant Alexander (United States) (2)

== See also ==
- Rugby league in the United States
