= Darryl Howland =

Australian rules footballer

Personal information
- Full name: Darryl Howland
- Born: 18 February 1943 (age 83)
- Original team: Dimboola
- Height: 187 cm (6 ft 2 in)
- Weight: 77 kg (170 lb)

Playing career^{1}
Years	Club	Games (Goals)
1962–63	South Melbourne	9 (1)
- ^{1} Playing statistics correct to the end of 1963.

Darryl Howland (born 18 February 1943) is a former Australian rules footballer who played with South Melbourne in the Victorian Football League (VFL).
