= Daniel Wagon =

Australian rugby league footballer & coach

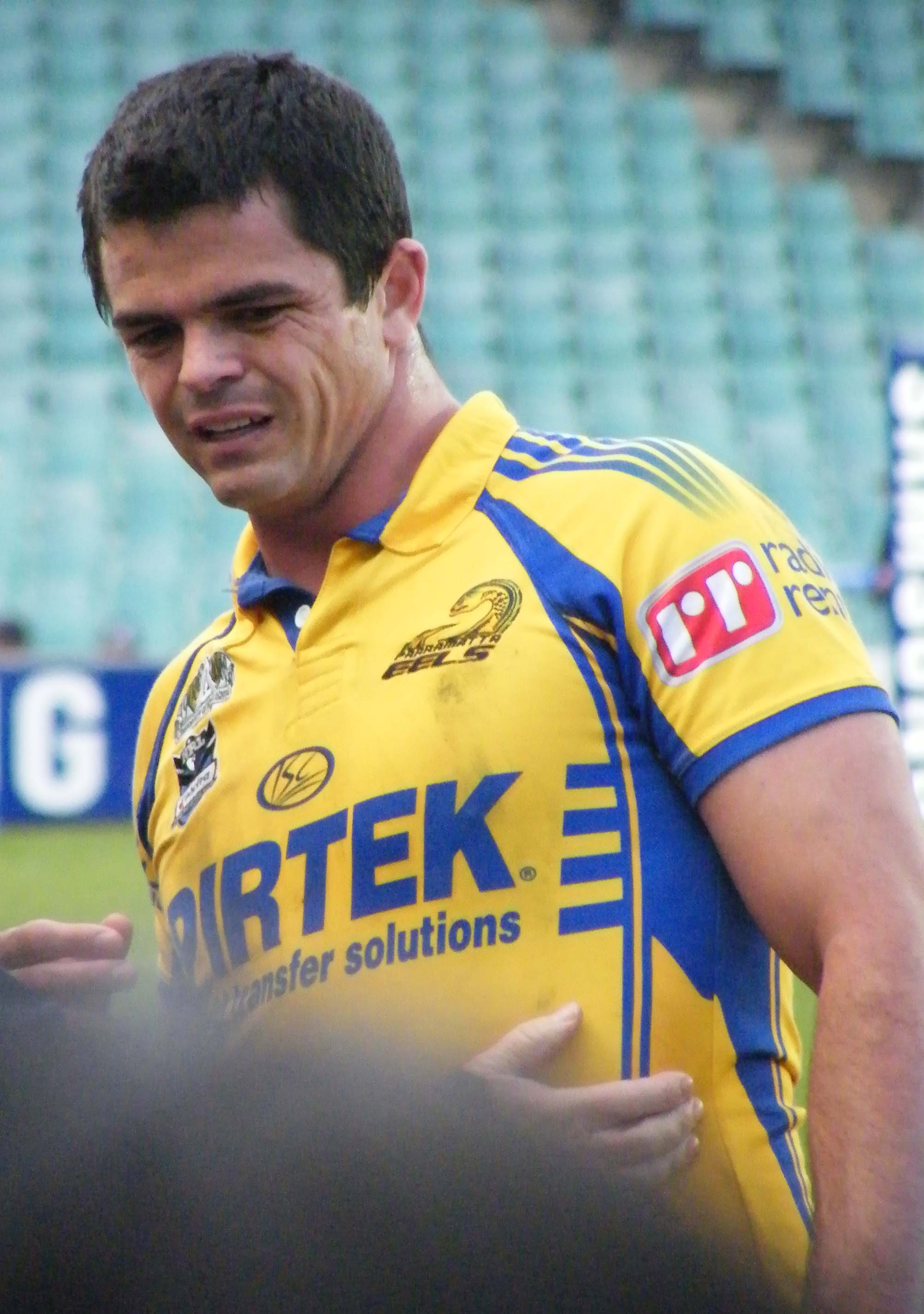
- Wagon in 2008

Personal information
- Full name: Daniel David Wagon
- Born: 30 April 1976 (age 50) Brisbane, Queensland, Australia
- Height: 187 cm (6 ft 2 in)
- Weight: 98 kg (15 st 6 lb)

Playing information
- Position: Lock, Five-eighth
Club
Years	Team	Pld	T	G	FG	P
1997–98	St. George Dragons	28	11	0	0	44
1999–08	Parramatta Eels	204	43	0	0	172
2009	Limoux Grizzlies	20	10	0	0	40
2010	Aston Bulls	6	1	0	0	4
	Total	258	65	0	0	260
Representative
Years	Team	Pld	T	G	FG	P
2001	Queensland	3	0	0	0	0

Coaching information
Club
Years	Team	Gms	W	D	L	W%
2009	Limoux Grizzlies
- Source: As of 4 February 2021

Daniel Wagon (born 30 April 1976) is an Australian professional rugby league coach who is the head coach of the Limoux Grizzlies in the Elite One Championship. He is a former professional rugby league footballer who played for the Aston DSC Bulls in the AMNRL. He primarily played in the back row. He previously played for the St. George Dragons and Parramatta Eels in the National Rugby League where he started his career in the centres before moving to the back row.

== Background ==
Born in Brisbane, Queensland, Wagon played his junior rugby league for the Springwood Tigers and attended Runcorn State High School.

== Playing career ==
=== NRL ===
After graduating high school, Wagon moved to Yamba, New South Wales and played for the Lower Clarence Magpies. Alongside Daniel Brown, younger brother of then-St George Dragons hooker Nathan Brown, Wagon travelled to Sydney, where he trialled for the Manly Warringah Sea Eagles and Dragons, eventually signing with St. George. Wagon made his first grade debut for St. George in round 3 of the 1997 ARL season against Illawarra scoring a try during the clubs 20-8 victory at WIN Stadium. He spent two seasons with the club from 1997 to 1998 before joining the Parramatta Eels.

He was part of the Parramatta sides which suffered preliminary final heartbreak in 1999 and 2000. Wagon was selected to represent Queensland as five-eighth for all three 2001 State of Origin series games. At the end of the season he played for the Parramatta Eels at lock forward in their upset 2001 NRL grand final loss to the Newcastle Knights.

In 2005, Wagon made 15 appearances for Parramatta as the club won the minor premiership and made it all the way to the preliminary final before suffering a shock 29-0 defeat by North Queensland. Wagon subsequently played for Parramatta in their unsuccessful finals campaigns in 2006 and 2007. Wagon played one further year for Parramatta in 2008, making 17 appearances. In total, Wagon suffered four preliminary final defeats and a grand final loss at the club in a period where the Parramatta Eels fell short of a long awaited premiership.

=== France ===
He joined French rugby leagues Elite One Championship for the 2009 season where he played for the Limoux Grizzlies. He finished playing in France at the beginning of April.

=== Return to Australia ===
He returned to Australia in 2009 with the Gundagai Tigers in the Group 9 rugby league competition before moving to the States.

=== United States ===
Wagon was one of the international players invited to the launch of the proposed NRLUS competition in the United States in July 2010. He also joined the Aston Bulls of the semi-professional American National Rugby League (AMNRL), making him the highest profile player in the AMNRL. He arrived in May 2010 and began training with the club in preparation for their first match for the Philadelphia Fight.

== Career highlights ==
- First Grade Debut: for St. George against Illawarra, on 22 March 1997 (Round 3)
- Origin Selection: for Queensland Origin, 2001
- Test Selection: for the Kangaroo Tour of England in 2001, though he did not play a game on the three test tour.
- 2001 minor premiership winner : With Parramatta
- 2005 minor premiership winner : With Parramatta
