= David Niu =

Former United States dual-code rugby international footballer

Personal information
- Full name: David Niumataiwalu
- Born: 3 January 1966 (age 60) Sydney, New South Wales, Australia
- Height: 5 ft 11 in (1.80 m)
- Weight: 192 lb (87 kg)

Playing information

Rugby league
- Position: Halfback
Club
Years	Team	Pld	T	G	FG	P
1990–91	St. George	19	2	1	0	10
1991	Villeneuve Leopards
	Bramley R.L.F.C.
	Bradford Bulls
	Total	19	2	1	0	10
Representative
Years	Team	Pld	T	G	FG	P
1993–06	United States	60	12	40	0	128

Rugby union
- Position: Standoff
Representative
Years	Team	Pld	T	G	FG	P
1999	United States	11	1	1	1	11

Coaching information

Rugby league
Club
Years	Team	Gms	W	D	L	W%
1994–2004	Glen Mills Bulls	110	102	0	8	93
Representative
Years	Team	Gms	W	D	L	W%
1993–03	United States	36	22	0	14	61
2009	United States	1	1	0	0	100
2011	United States	1	0	0	1	0

Rugby union
Club
Years	Team	Gms	W	D	L	W%
2000–02	Philadelphia Whitemarsh RFC	16	12	0	4	75
- Source: As of 29 March 2021

David Niumataiwalu, better known as David Niu (born 3 January 1966), is an Australian-American dual-code international rugby league and rugby union administrator, coach and former player. Regarded as one of the founders of rugby league in the United States, he established the American National Rugby League (AMNRL), the United States' first domestic rugby league competition and formerly the national governing body for the sport. He later served as president of AFL Global, an organization promoting arena football.

Niu played for the St. George Rugby Union Club from 1984 to 1989 before shifting to the rugby league code. His professional league career included two seasons with the St. George Dragons in Australia's New South Wales Rugby League (now the National Rugby League) from 1990 to 1991; his position was halfback. In 1993 he relocated to the United States where he was involved in promoting both codes. He was one of the founders of the United States national rugby league team, and played on the USA Eagles national rugby union team, appearing in the 1999 Rugby World Cup. In 1997 he founded the competition that became the modern AMNRL, serving as its president until 2013.

== Early life and rugby career ==
Niumataiwalu was born and raised in Sydney, New South Wales, Australia. He attended James Cook Boys Technology High School in nearby Kogarah. He is of Fijian descent.

Niu played rugby union for St. George Rugby Union Club from 1984 to 1989, playing a total of 250 first division games. He also represented Sydney, the New South Wales Waratahs and was a member of the Australian Barbarians, and captained the Australian College and University teams from 1984 to 1988. In 1986 he was one of three winners of the Ken Catchpole Medal. In 1987 he earned a spot on the Australian national rugby union team training squad for the 1987 Rugby World Cup.

Niu shifted to professional rugby league in 1989. In 1990 he was signed by the St. George Dragons of the New South Wales Rugby League premiership (now the National Rugby League), Australia's highest rugby league competition, as a halfback. He played for St. George for two seasons, appearing in a total of nineteen games and scoring two tries and one field goal. As a former Dragons player, Niu has been outspoken about the club moving away from Kogarah's WIN Jubilee Oval. He later played for the Villeneuve Leopards in France, and had spells with the Bramley and Bradford Bulls in the United Kingdom before retiring.

== American career ==
In 1991, Niu met his future wife Donna Camac while on a St. George team retreat in Hawaii. He gained a release from the final years of his contract with the Dragons and relocated to her hometown of Philadelphia, where he took a job as a teacher at the Glen Mills Schools, a reform school for court-referred youth with an aptitude for sports. He worked to introduce rugby league at the school, drawing the attention of American rugby league enthusiast Mike Mayer. Niu and Mayer organized a U.S. national rugby league team for a trip to the 1992 Rugby League World Sevens in Sydney. After Mayer departed Niu continued developing the national team, bringing them to international competitions such as the 1995 Emerging Nations Tournament and a short tour of Australia in 1997.

During this time, Niu also played rugby union in the U.S. He was named in the United States national rugby union team, making eleven international appearances, including at the 1999 Rugby World Cup. In 2000 he became head coach of Philadelphia Whitemarsh RFC in the Rugby Super League, the highest level of rugby union in the United States.

In 1997 Niu was one of the founders of Super League America, the first major attempt to organize a domestic rugby league competition in the United States, and served as the new league's executive director. The organization managed the national team and launched a six-club domestic competition. On top of serving as head of Super League America, Niu was also player-coach for the Glen Mills Bulls (now the Aston Bulls), the most dominant team in the league. In 2000 Super League America reorganized as the United States Rugby League, and the following year it became the American National Rugby League.

In 2009 Niu was involved in a proposed American professional rugby league competition, the National Rugby League USA (NRLUS), though this failed to get off the ground. Niu was also heavily involved in planning the Atlantic Cup tournament, beginning in 2009, and in the United States being awarded the qualifying tournament for the final berth in the 2013 Rugby League World Cup.

Niu has served as head coach for the USA Tomahawks on three separate occasions.

== AFL Global ==
In February 2013, Niu resigned from the AMNRL to take a position as president of AFL Global. The organization is an independent business venture that hopes to work with the Arena Football League to expand arena football to China and abroad.
