= Bunz Trading Zone =

Online community and company

- Abbreviation: Bunz
- Formation: 2013
- Founder: Emily Bitze
- Founded at: Toronto, Canada
- Type: Bartering community, and For-profit-company
- CEO: Firat Eren
- Formerly called: Bums Trading Zone

Bunz Trading Zone (sometimes Bunz) is the name of a Canadian company and bartering marketplace application available on web, iOS, and Android.

Bunz Trading Zone was started in 2013 by Emily Bitze.

== History ==
Bums Trading Zone was the name given to a private Facebook group created by Torontonian clothing store worker and musician Emily Bitze in 2013. Soon after the group's name was changed to Bunz Trading Zone. The group was used by people to trade unwanted items, and the initial group was replicated by various similarly named and themed groups including Bunz Makeup Zone, Bunz Home Zone, Bunz Mental Health Zone and Bunz Helping Zone. Paying for items in cash via the Bunz groups was forbidden, and both TTC tokens and alcoholic drinks were commonly used in lieu of currency. By 2015, the main group had 12,000 members and by 2017 it had almost 60,000. The same year, the 250 unofficially affiliated Facebook groups had over 300,000 members. By 2016, Bunz groups had spread to eight cities, both Fidelity and EBay were interested in funding the groups.

At the same time, a group of technologists were working on an application to also facilitate cashless bartering; the app was called Shufl. The group was led by CEO, Sascha Mojtiahedi. Mojtiahedi was searching for users for their app and persuaded the Bunz team to partner, promising financial support for Bunz until corporate investment was agreed. In 2016, $1million of angel investor funding enabled the creation of Android and iOS applications, enabling people anywhere in the world to trade goods via the Bunz system. In 2018, Bunz launched the cryptocurrency BTZ. Outside of the application, retail establishments in Toronto accepted BTZ. In 2019, Bunz became registered as a corporation and opened an office. Mojtiahedi was appointed at CEO. Tensions between Bitze and Mojtiahedi started and grew, with disagreements on how the company should make money and also if the company should make money. Bitze left the company and the team divided between those focussed on the for-profit app and those focussed on the cashless trading Facebook group.

On September 11, 2019, due to cashflow problems, Bunz terminated the employment of fifteen staff (representing the majority them), cut most retailers off the BTZ cryptocurrency trading software, and froze the digital wallets of BTZ users. In response, over 40 of the Bunz-themed but independently administered Facebook groups changed their name from the Bunz prefix to Palz.

Firat J. B. Eren is currently, in 2025, the CEO of Bunz. He likes to climb mountains, and has initiated a mountain-linked user-level gauge for the platform, with each level being named after a famous mountain.
