= New Haven Warriors =

US defunct rugby league team, based in West Haven, Connecticut

Club information
- Full name: New Haven Warriors; Rugby League Football Club
- Nickname: Warriors
- Colours: Black; Grey
- Founded: 2006; 19 years ago
- Exited: 2013; 12 years ago

Former details
- Ground: Ken Strong Stadium West Haven, Connecticut (5000)
- Competition: USA Rugby League

Records
- Premierships: 1 (AMNRL) (2008 (AMNRL))
- Runners-up: 2 (1 USARL, 1 AMNRL) (2011 (USARL), 2010 (AMNRL))
- Minor premierships: 1 (AMNRL) (2010)

The New Haven Warriors were a rugby league football team based in New Haven, Connecticut, U.S. They played in the American National Rugby League (AMNRL) from 2006 to 2010 and in the USA Rugby League (USARL) from 2011 to 2012 before withdrawing. They played their home games at Ken Strong Stadium in West Haven, Connecticut.

The team was established in 2006 as an AMNRL expansion team. In 2011 they became one of seven clubs that withdrew from the AMNRL to form the new USA Rugby League. The Warriors won the 2008 AMNRL Championship and made playoff appearances every year from 2006 to 2011, advancing to the AMNRL Grand Final in 2010 and the USARL Grand Final in 2011. They were named for the New Zealand professional club the New Zealand Warriors of the National Rugby League.

== History ==
=== AMNRL ===
The club was founded for the 2006 AMNRL season by Adam Hamon, Blair Wards, Chris Willey and Tony Feasey. The Warriors management later consisted of Adam Hamon (chairman), Brian Lee (Marketing and Sponsorship), Chris Yergan (Treasurer), Bill West and Ed Reed (IT), and executive committee members Tony Feasey, Siose Muliumu. In their debut AMNRL season the Warriors side had an impressive inaugural year finishing 5th and within the top tier bracket of the competition and qualifying for the playoff series; however, they would eventually be knocked out by the New York Knights in a close encounter that finished 26–22.

In 2007 the club again finished 5th and again faced the New York Knights in the playoffs to the final. This time they won 34–8 but were eliminated by their interstate rivals and eventual champions the Connecticut Wildcats in the semifinals 42–18. The Warriors earned the reputation as the most physical side in the AMNRL, and includes several Maori and Polynesian players from New Zealand. In 2008, the club won the Grand Final, beating the Aston Bulls 50–18 at Fort Dix, New Jersey. They advanced through the semifinal by beating the Connecticut Wildcats 40–34.

=== USARL ===
On January 12, 2011, New Haven became one of seven teams to break away from the AMNRL and form the new USA Rugby League. After finishing fourth in the regular season and advancing to the playoffs, the Warriors achieved an upset win over the minor premiers Jacksonville Axemen to secure a championship final berth against the Philadelphia Fight. They were defeated by Philadelphia in the USARL's inaugural Grand Final.

New Haven finished seventh of eight teams in 2012, missing the playoffs. They were initially announced as competing in 2013, but withdrew before the season, along with Oneida FC of Boston.

== USARL season summaries ==
C=Champions, R=Runners-Ups, F=Finished first, P=Playoff Appearance, L=Finished Last (Brackets Represent Playoff Games)
Competition	Games Played	Games Won	Games Drawn	Games Lost	Ladder Position	C	R	F	P	L	Coach	Captain	Notes
2011 USARL season	8 (1)	5 (0)	0	3 (0)	4/8		R		P			Siose Muliumu	
2012 USARL season	8 (0)	1 (0)	0	7 (0)	7/8							Siose Muliumu	

== Uniform and colors ==
Team badge used until 2010

For their inaugural American National Rugby League season the club adopted the colors of navy blue, green and white stripe design characteristic of the old style vintage rugby league jerseys. The warriors later sport the reverse colors of their affiliate club, the New Zealand Warriors, who played in grey and black.

== Stadium ==
The Warriors home ground was Ken Strong Stadium at West Haven High School in West Haven, Connecticut.

== Statistics and records ==
Biggest winning margin

Margin	Score	Opponent	Venue	Date
76	76 - 0	Northern Raiders	Andrews Field	June 14, 2008 (Rd 2)

Biggest losing margin

Margin	Score	Opponent	Venue	Date
16	40 - 24	Connecticut Wildcats	Jonathan Law Stadium	June 30, 2007 (Rd 5)

Most points for the club

Player	Points	Years	M
Siose Muliumu	28 (6 tries)	2006	5 *

Most points in a match

Points	Player	Opponent	Venue	Date	Score
36 (3 tries/12 conversions)	Luke Carr	Northern Raiders	Andrews Field	Round 2, 2008	76 - 0
16 (2 tries/4 goals)	Steve Scanlan	Boston Braves	Saunders Stadium	Round 7, 2006	32 - 18
8 (2 tries)	Siose Muliumu	Connecticut Wildcats	Depew Park	Round 4, 2006	22 - 42
8 (2 tries)	Siose Muliumu	Boston Braves	Saunders Stadium	Round 7, 2006	32 - 18
8 (2 tries)	Siose Muliumu	Connecticut Wildcats	Dealy Field	Round 9, 2006	26 - 32
8 (2 tries)	Blair Wards	Boston Braves	Saunders Stadium	Round 7, 2006	32 - 18

== Honors ==
2006 - 1/4 finalists

2007 - semifinalists

2008 - Grand Final Winners

2009 - semifinalists

- AMNRL Championship titles: 1
- 2010 - Grand finalist runner up
- 2011 - Grand finalist runner up

== See also ==
- Rugby league in the United States
- List of defunct rugby league clubs in the United States
