= New York Knights (rugby league) =

Rugby League Football Club in New York City, NY

Club information
- Full name: New York Knights; Rugby League Football Club
- Nickname: Knight
- Founded: 1997; 29 years ago Revived 2026; 0 years ago
- Website: Team Website

Current details
- Ground: TBA
- Coach: Matt Duckworth
- Competition: USA Rugby League

Records
- Premierships: 4 (AMNRL) 2002, 2009, 2011, 2012
- Runners-up: 1 (USARL) (2017)
- Minor premierships: 2 (AMNRL) 2011, 2012

The New York Knights are a semi-professional rugby league football team based in New York City that currently plays in the USA Rugby League, as a member of the Rugby League United Conference (Northeast RL). They played their home games at Pier 40 in Hudson River Park.

Originally known as the New York Broncos, the team was founded in 1997 and joined the league eventually known as the American National Rugby League (AMNRL) from its inaugural 1998 season until it folded in 2014.

== History ==
The team was founded in 1997. Originally known as the New York Broncos, they joined Super League America, the predecessor to the American National Rugby League, for its inaugural 1998 season. In 2001, the Knights and other teams in the competition departed to form the AMNRL. All teams formed a partnership with teams in Australia's National Rugby League. New York formed a partnership with the Newcastle Knights, who sent them Knights jerseys; the team subsequently changed their name to the New York Knights.

The Knights advanced to the AMNRL Grand Final in 2002. A serious thunderstorm interrupted the game, and the Knights, who were leading perennial champions the Glen Mills Bulls 18-12, were declared winners. This was the first time any team besides the Bulls had taken the Grand Final. The Knights made several other playoff appearances, and defeated the Jacksonville Axemen to win the 2009 AMNRL Grand Final. The Knights have provided a total of nine players to the United States national rugby league team to date, as well as one to Japan.

The Knights remained in the AMNRL until it folded in 2014. The following year, they joined the USA Rugby League, along with other surviving AMNRL clubs.

=== Hiatus and revival ===
The Knights went into hiatus in 2019. In 2026, newly promoted Super League club York Knights announced a partnership and revival of the club and its brand. The New York Knights re-entered USA Rugby League's National Competition as a member of the Northeast Conference (Rugby League United). An open combine was held to help the process to select the club's 2026 roster.

== Uniform and colors ==
Former logo

Beginning in 2001, the Knights wore predominantly blue uniforms with red and white trim. The uniforms and team colors were based on those of the Newcastle Knights of the NRL, due to their team partnership. For the 2006 and 2007 seasons the club's major jersey sponsor was Guinness.

When the team returned to play in 2026, the New York Knights formed a partnership with the York Knights of Super League, adopting a similar logo and color scheme.

== Stadium ==
The Knights currently use the Pier 40, Hudson River Park Stadium in Hudson River Park as their home ground. The stadium is sometimes referred to as The Castle because of the architecture and surrounding river, give the park a Castle like appearance.

== Current squad ==
Squad for the 2026 USARL season.

- 1.Hugh Byrne (Fullback)
- 2.Netani Waqavesi (Wing)
- 3.Suliasi Cama (Centre)
- 4.Luis Guevara (Centre)
- 5.Alli Wallace (Wing)
- 6.Dominic Sofe (Five-eighth)
- 7.Veralamu Dikidikilati (Halfback)
- 8.Soa Tone (Prop)
- 9.Alex Griffin (Hooker)
- 10.Andrew Lynch (Prop)
- 11.Jake Sharkey (Second-row)
- 12.Jed Hendrixson (Second-row)
- 13.Anthony Russo (Lock)
- 14.Chris Vakasisikakala (Centre)
- 15.Joe Vusalevu
- 16.Jale Vakaloloma (Prop)
- 17.Samuela Turanga (Wing)
- 18.Sebastiano Villiani
- 19.Thomas Defede
- 20.John Santiago
- 21.Peter Lupton (Five-eighth)
- 22.Anson Jiang (Prop)
- 23.Inga Tone
- 24.Sean Kieran
- 25.Andrew Lynch
- 26.Pete Aragones
- 27.George Reis (Fullback)
- 28.Matt Duckworth (Lock)
- 29.Tevita Bryce (Prop)

== Team History ==
New York Knights Team History (2002 - onwards)
C = Champions R = Runner Up F = Finished First P = Playoffs L = Last Place
Competition	Games Played	Games Won	Games Drawn	Games Lost	Ladder Position	C	R	F	P	L	Notes
2002 AMNRL season	Record unknown					C			P		W Grand Final v Glen Mills Bulls, 18–12
2003 AMNRL season	Record unknown										
2004 AMNRL season	Record unknown										
2005 AMNRL season	Record unknown										
2006 AMNRL season					6th of 11				P		W QF v New Haven, 26–22; L SF v Connecticut, 54–6
2007 AMNRL season	9	5	1	3	4th of 10						W QF v New Haven, 34–8; L SF v Connecticut, 42–18
2008 AMNRL season					5th of 10						
2009 AMNRL season	8	7	0	1	2nd of 11	C			P		W SF v New Haven, 20–16; W Grand Final v Jacksonville, 32–12
2010 AMNRL season	6	4	1	2	4th of 11				P		W QF v Washington, 28–22; L SF v New Haven, 42–18
2011 AMNRL season	7	6	0	1	1st of 6	C		F	P		W SF v Bucks County Sharks, 72–4; W Grand Final v Connecticut, 38–4
2012 AMNRL season	7	6	0	1	1st of 6	C		F	P		W SF v Bucks County Sharks, 52–4; W Grand Final v Connecticut, 60–40
2013 AMNRL season	7	6	0	1	2nd of 6		R		P		L Grand Final v New Haven, 42–18
2014: AMNRL Season canceled, league & federation folds
2015 USARL season	8	3	0	5	10th of 14						Missed playoffs
2016 USARL season	8	7	0	1	2nd of 14				P		L North Semifinal vs Boston, 19–12
2017 USARL season	8	8	0	0	1st of 12			F	P		W North Championship v Northern Virginia, 42–20; L National Championship v Atlanta, 32–18
2018 USARL season	8	4	0	4	4th of 7				P		L North Championship SF v Brooklyn Kings, 20–8
2019–2025: Club on hiatus
2026 USARL season	6	4	0	2	1st of 5			F	P		L Northeast Conference F v Washington DC Cavalry, 44–24

== Honors ==
- AMNRL Championship titles: 4

2002, 2009, 2011, 2012

- Mother's Day Sevens: 1

2001

- North East Division: 1

2016

== See also ==
- Rugby league in the United States
- List of sports clubs inspired by others
