= American National Rugby League =

Rugby league organization in the United States

- Founded: 1997
- Ceased: 2014
- Competitions: American National Rugby League

(United States)

The American National Rugby League (AMNRL) was the national governing body for rugby league in the United States from 1997 to 2014.

The organization was responsible for running the domestic club competitions and the United States national rugby league team in addition to other responsibilities during its time of operation

The organization was founded by Australian former professional player David Niu and throughout its existence gained recognition from the Rugby League International Federation (RLIF) as the governing body for the sport in the United States.

The domestic competition began with six teams competing and grew to eleven teams by 2010, with plans for westward expansion.

On January 12, 2011, a schism occurred with seven teams departing the AMNRL to form the USA Rugby League (USARL), a rival governing body.

In the years that followed, the AMNRL suffered from competition with the USARL, and did not host a domestic competition after the 2013 season, though it continued to organize international team games.

The organization folded in 2014, with USARL becoming the recognized body for rugby league in the USA.

== History ==
=== Origins ===
The roots of the American National Rugby League date to 1997, when Super League America was formed to organize a national team, establish an amateur domestic competition, and build the sport in the United States. The organization was initially established by Rupert Murdoch's News Corporation in an attempt to spread rugby league to the United States. The organization was run by former professional player David Niu, who had come to Philadelphia in 1992 and had been active in promoting the sport there. Super League America's domestic competition began its inaugural season in 1998, and was contested by six teams all in the Northeastern United States: the Glen Mills Bulls (later the Aston Bulls), the New Jersey Sharks (now the Bucks County Sharks in the USARL), the New York Broncos (now the New York Knights in the USARL), the Philadelphia Bulldogs (now the Philadelphia Fight in the USARL), the Boston Storm, and the Pennsylvania Raiders. The Boston and Pennsylvania teams soon dropped out; the others later formed the core of the AMNRL. Super League America organized the domestic competition in 1998 and 1999; the Glen Mills Bulls were declared league champions in both years.

In December 1999, Super League America announced a reorganization. The league headquarters moved to Jacksonville, Florida, with Jacksonville marketing executive Steve Gormley made the organization's new president; David Niu would serve as CEO and maintain the northeastern branch. The organization was renamed the United States Rugby League, and set its sights on expanding into the Southeastern United States and attracting British rugby league teams to Florida for training camps and international competitions. The USRL was successful in attracting foreign teams and advanced the U.S. national team to the Rugby League World Cup qualifiers for the first time; however, it was soon beset by internal strife.

Complications over a deal with the British Rugby Football League led to a dispute that bankrupted the USRL. In the midst of the dispute, in May 2001 the five domestic teams announced they would form a new organization, the American National Rugby League, with Niu as its head. Later that year Gormley sold the USRL's assets to the Rugby Football League, leaving the AMNRL as the sole rugby league body in the United States.

=== Growth ===
The AMNRL was affiliated with the Rugby League International Federation, the sport's world governing body, through Super League America. Expansion of the domestic league became a major goal for the organization, and new teams were added every few years. The Wilmington Vikings (later the New York Raiders) joined the competition in 2002, bringing the number of teams back up to six. The following year the Connecticut Wildcats of Norwalk, Connecticut and the Washington D.C. Slayers joined.

In 2006 the league expanded once again to include the Jacksonville Axemen, the New Haven Warriors, and the Boston Braves. After the end of the season, however, the Boston Braves folded, and two charter teams, the Media Mantarays and the Philadelphia Fight, announced they were merging. The Fairfax Eagles joined the competition in 2007, and the Boston Thirteens joined in 2009. Another charter franchise, the Bucks County Sharks, suspended operations in 2010, while the Pittsburgh Vipers were added.

In 2010, the AMNRL entered into a relationship with the Star Group to rebrand the league, its assets, and its teams. In 2012, the AMNRL entered into a partnership arrangement with Grand Prix Entertainment to promote and grow the game in the USA, in return for ownership of the league and TV rights to World Cup matches in 2013. This led to complications regarding the ownership of the league.

=== Expansion plans ===
WAMNRL logo

The AMNRL announced various plans for future expansion at different times. Beginning in 2001 the league announced plans for a Western American National Rugby League (WAMNRL) to develop the sport on the West Coast of the United States. The AMNRL has revisited these plans several times since.

In 2009 league officials announced the creation of a new, fully professional league, the National Rugby League USA (NRLUS), which originally hoped to launch in 2010. The AMNRL would serve as an amateur and semi-professional feeder league for the new competition. However, the new league never got off the ground, with officials blaming the Great Recession.

=== AMNRL/USARL split and collapse ===
On January 12, 2011, seven teams announced they were breaking with the AMNRL to form a new league, the USA Rugby League (USARL). Officials cited the lack of club involvement in the AMNRL's decision-making as the reason for the split; the USA Rugby League implemented a constituency which involved member clubs in its administration. The departing teams were the Boston 13s, the D.C. Slayers, the Fairfax Eagles, the Jacksonville Axemen, the New Haven Warriors, the Philadelphia Fight, and the Pittsburgh Vipers (later the Pittsburgh Sledgehammers). Five of these teams (all except Fairfax and Pittsburgh), along with three new teams, participated in the USARL's inaugural 2011 season.

The AMNRL struggled over the next few years due to the competition from the USARL. The RLIF stepped in to work with the leagues toward an ultimate goal of reunification, but were unable to find a solution. The AMNRL put its domestic competition on hiatus after the 2013 season, though it continued to organize games for the national team, including the U.S.'s first ever appearance at the Rugby League World Cup in 2013, in which the Tomahawks reached the quarter-finals. The split between the leagues cost the U.S. its automatic qualification to the 2017 World Cup. In August 2014, the AMNRL announced it would cease operations to end the rift and allow the USARL to seek status as the national governing body.

== Commissioners and presidents ==
- David Niu (1998–2012), President
- Curtis Cunz (2013–2014), President

== Domestic competition ==
AMNRL
- Sport: Rugby league
- Inaugural season: 1998
- Ceased: 2014
- Number of teams: 5
- Country: USA
- Champions: Connecticut Wildcats (2013)
- Most titles: Aston Bulls (6 titles)
- Website: www.amnrl.org

=== Season structure ===
From 1998 through 2013, member teams of the domestic competition competed in a Grand Final for the league championship. The winning team received the "Ferrainola Cup", named for American rugby league promoter Sam Ferrainola. Beginning in 2011, the AMNRL season consisted of an eight-round, seven-game regular season followed by a playoffs series culminating in the Grand Final. All six teams advanced to the playoffs, which consisted of a three-round single-elimination tournament, with the Grand Final winners receiving the championship title.

One of signature events in the AMNRL's domestic schedule was the War at the Shore. The event, held annually in Sea Isle City, New Jersey, generally consisted of full 13-a-side and rugby league sevens games between AMNRL teams, local and national representative sides, and developmental teams.

=== Teams ===
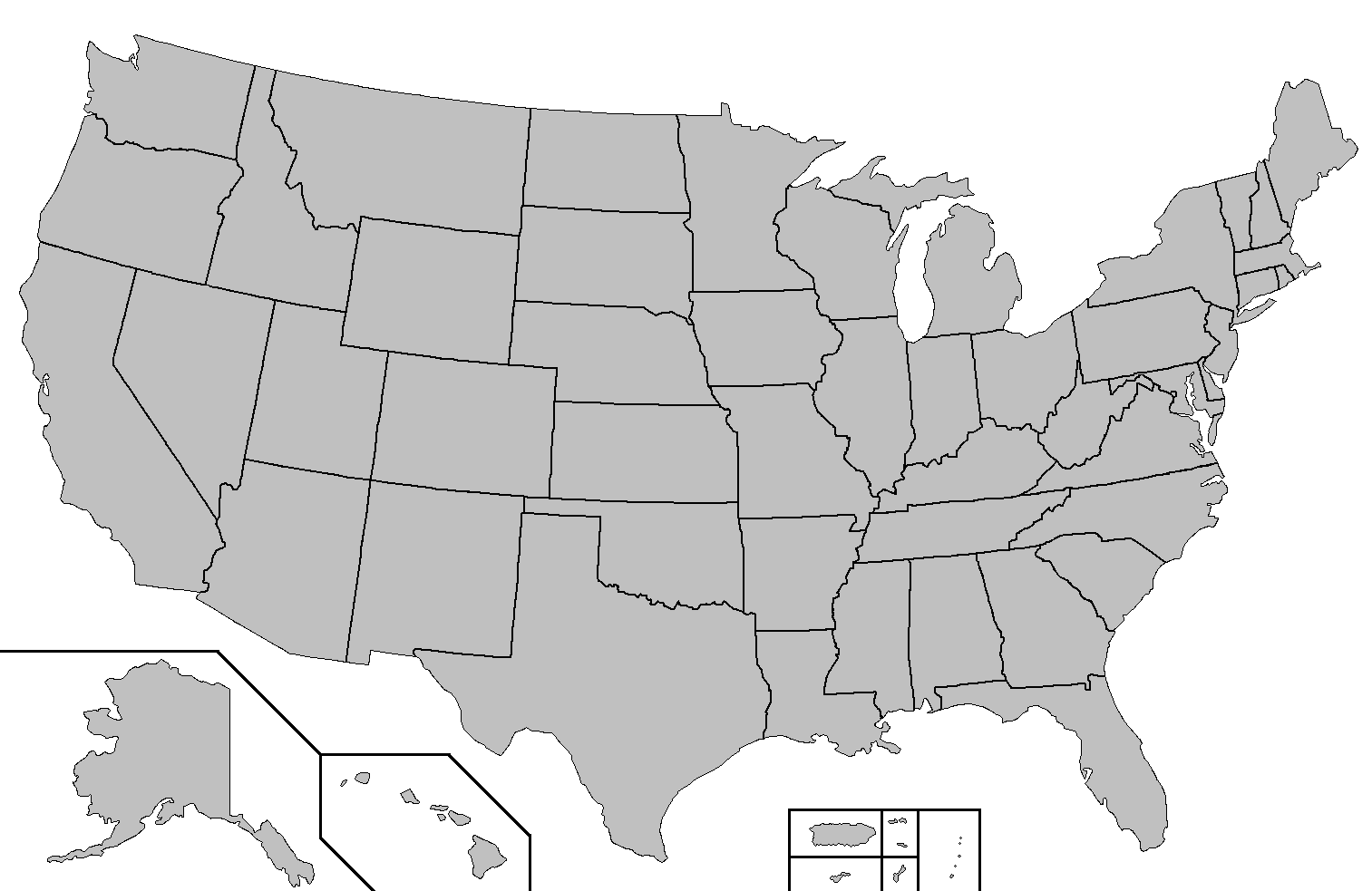

Six teams played in the 2011 season. Four of these teams, the Aston Bulls, the Connecticut Wildcats, the New York Knights, and the New York Raiders, played in the AMNRL the previous season. The Bucks County Sharks, who did not compete in the 2010 season, also rejoined the league in 2011. A sixth team, the Delaware Vipers, were announced in April 2011 and played during the season. Ostensibly based in Wilmington, Delaware, the AMNRL considered them successors to the Media Mantarays, who played in the competition from 2000–2006.

In 2011 the AMNRL launched a Hawaii-based competition in partnership with the Hawaii Rugby League. The AMNRL dubbed this the "Pacific Conference", while the East Coast-based competition was named the "Atlantic Conference". Teams listed in the Pacific Conference as of July 16, 2011 are the Hawaii Islanders, Honolulu Titans, Kalihi Raiders, Marist Marauders, Maui Voyagers, and Tama Suma Ie. However, as of that time, only the Marist, Maui, Tama Sulu, and Kalihi teams had played games, and had not played consistently.

In addition, other teams competed in AMNRL-sponsored tournaments. The Chicago Stockyarders played two rugby league nines games in 2010. On June 10, 2011, the Utah Avalanche of Salt Lake City, Utah, announced they were joining the AMNRL as a developing team. The Avalanche were formed in early 2011 and were previously aligned with the USARL, playing in a USARL rugby league nines tournament in Philadelphia in May. In June 2011 they announced they were re-aligning with the AMNRL.

On November 26, 2011 the AMNRL announced that the Northern Virginia Eagles, formerly the Fairfax Eagles, would be reforming and joining the competition. In the new year the AMNRL released its 2011 review and announced its "Road to the 2013 Rugby League World Cup" which includes launching teams and competitions in the East, Midwest, West and Southwest. A further two teams were announced to be joining the league on January 13 – the Las Vegas Warriors and Colorado Blizzard were announced to be part of a Western Conference as well as new teams forming from Los Angeles and San Francisco.

=== Final AMNRL teams (2014) ===
Final AMNRL teams (2014)
Team	Stadium	City/Area	Foundation Year	Championships
Pennsylvania Bulls	Sun Valley High School	Aston Township, Pennsylvania	1998	6 (as Glen Mills Bulls)
Bucks County Sharks	Falls Township Community Park	Levittown, Bucks County, Pennsylvania	1997	0
Connecticut Wildcats	Brien McMahon Stadium	Norwalk, Connecticut	2003	3- 2003, 2006, 2007
New York Knights	Hudson River Park	New York City, New York	1997	2- 2002, 2009
New York Raiders	Rockland Lake State Park	Rockland County, New York	2002	0

=== Former teams ===
Former AMNRL teams
Team	City/Area	Foundation Year	Final Year
Boston Storm	Boston, Massachusetts	1998	1998
Pennsylvania Raiders	Pennsylvania	1998	1998
Delaware Valley Mantarays	Ridley Park, Pennsylvania	2000	2006 ^{Note}
Boston Braves	Boston, Massachusetts	2006	2006
Philadelphia Bulldogs/Fight	Conshohocken, Pennsylvania	1998	2010 (USARL)
Washington DC Slayers	Washington, D.C.	2003	2010 (USARL)
Jacksonville Axemen	Jacksonville, Florida	2006	2010 (USARL)
New Haven Warriors	West Haven, Connecticut	2006	2010 (USARL)
Boston Thirteens	Boston, Massachusetts	2009	2010 (USARL)
Pittsburgh Vipers	Cheswick, Pennsylvania	2010	2010 (USARL)
Delaware Vipers	Wilmington, Delaware	2011	2011
Iowa City Crash	Iowa City, Iowa	2012	2013 (GPRL)
Southampton Dragons	Southampton, New York	2013	2014
Northern Virginia Eagles	Manassas, Virginia	2007	2014 (USARL)
Bucks County Sharks	Levittown, Bucks County, Pennsylvania	1997	2015 (USARL)
Connecticut Wildcats	Norwalk, Connecticut	2003	2015 (USARL)
New York Knights	New York City, New York	1997	2015 (USARL)

^{Note} Delaware Valley Mantarays merged with Philadelphia Bulldogs in 2006. The AMNRL considers the Delaware Vipers to be successors to the Mantarays.

=== List of championship titles ===
Season	Championship Final Information			Regular Season Premiers
Season	Champions	Score	Runners-Up	Regular Season Premiers
1998	Glen Mills Bulls	66–12	Philadelphia Bulldogs
1999	Glen Mills Bulls	28–10	New Jersey Sharks
2000	Glen Mills Bulls	38–26	Philadelphia Bulldogs
2001	Glen Mills Bulls	26–16	Media Mantarays
2002	New York Knights	18–12	Glen Mills Bulls
2003	Connecticut Wildcats	38–14	Glen Mills Bulls
2004	Glen Mills Bulls	32–24	Connecticut Wildcats
2005	Glen Mills Bulls	32–30	Connecticut Wildcats
2006	Connecticut Wildcats	36–28	Glen Mills Bulls	Glen Mills Bulls
2007	Connecticut Wildcats	22–18	Aston DSC Bulls	Connecticut Wildcats
2008	New Haven Warriors	50–18	Aston DSC Bulls	Aston DSC Bulls
2009	New York Knights	32–12	Jacksonville Axemen	Jacksonville Axemen
2010	Jacksonville Axemen	34–14	New Haven Warriors	New Haven Warriors
2011	New York Knights	38–4	Connecticut Wildcats	New York Knights
2012	New York Knights	60–40	Connecticut Wildcats	New York Knights
2013	Connecticut Wildcats	42–10	New York Knights

=== Statistics and awards ===
==== League records ====
Largest victory: Jacksonville Axemen 90 – 8 Philadelphia Fight (2006)

==== Most Valuable Player Winners ====
At the conclusion of each season, the title of Most Valuable Player is awarded to the individual who accumulates the most points via a voting system that is undertaken after every game. Each official at the conclusion of a regular-season fixture awards either three, two or one points for the most deserving players on game day; these points are then added up to determine the MVP. Performance is not only measured by individual feats but also the influence that player has had on the performance of his respective team.

Year	Player	Club
2013	Mike Schacter	Connecticut Wildcats
2012	Matt Walsh	Connecticut Wildcats
2011	Nigel Milgate	New York Knights
2010	Adrian Grayson	Jacksonville Axemen
2009	Luke Hume	New York Knights
2008	Siose Muliumu	New Haven Warriors
2007	Tim Gee	Connecticut Wildcats
2006	Jason Gangaram	Glen Mills Bulls
2005	Andrew Webster / Erik Hollingsworth	Connecticut Wildcats / Glen Mills Bulls
2004	Marcus Acidopholus	Glen Mills Bulls
2003	Danny Bull	Connecticut Wildcats
2002	Shayne Mains	Glen Mills Bulls
2001	Dave DiValerio	Delaware Valley Mantarays
2000	Ed Woodbridge	Glen Mills Bulls
1999	Shayne Mains	Glen Mills Bulls
1998	Bill Hansbury	Glen Mills Bulls

Every season to date has seen an individual awarded the MVP excluding the 2005 season where both Andrew Webster and Erik Hollingsworth were awarded the Most Valuable player after they finished with equal points.

== See also ==
- Rugby league in the United States
- List of American rugby league champions
- List of defunct rugby league clubs in the United States
