= Bucks County Sharks =

US semi-professional rugby league club, based in Bucks County, Pennsylvania

Club information
- Full name: Bucks County Sharks; Rugby League Football Club
- Nickname: Sharks
- Colours: Light Blue; White; Black
- Founded: 1997; 29 years ago

Current details
- Ground: Falls Township Community Park Bucks County, Pennsylvania (2,500)
- CEO: Tim McCall
- Competition: USA Rugby League

The Bucks County Sharks were a rugby league football team based in Bucks County, Pennsylvania. The team played in the USA Rugby League.

Originally known as the New Jersey Sharks, the team was founded in 1997 and joined the now-defunct American National Rugby League (AMNRL) for its inaugural 1998 season. Despite the name, the team was based not in New Jersey but in nearby Levittown in Bucks County. They adopted their current name for the 2007 season. The Sharks suspended operations and did not compete in the 2010 season, but rejoined in 2011 and remained in the league until it folded in 2014. Subsequently, they joined the USARL for the 2015 USARL season.

== History ==
In 1997, the team was formed by Fred Backhaus and Phil Shipos. The Sharks were one of the charter franchises of the AMNRL, competing in its inaugural season. Though they played under the name New Jersey Sharks, they were actually based across state lines in nearby Levittown, Pennsylvania, a suburb of Philadelphia. Many players were drawn from the local Hibernian Rugby Football Club, or "Hibos".

Throughout their early years the Sharks were consistent playoff contenders, advancing to the Grand Final in 1999 and winning a minor premiership in 2002, though never winning a championship title. In 2007 they changed their name to the Bucks County Sharks, reflecting that they played in Bucks County, Pennsylvania. As a result of internal factors the Sharks suspended operations following the 2009 season, and did not play in the 2010 domestic competition. They remained active outside of the competition; they played a replacement game against the New York Knights after their scheduled opponents, the Northern Raiders, forfeited before the match. In December 2010, the Sharks announced they intended to return for the 2011 season. On January 31, 2011, they announced they would be committing to the AMNRL, rather than the upstart USA Rugby League.

The Sharks competed in the AMNRL until it folded in 2014. The following year they joined the USA Rugby League, along with two other surviving AMNRL clubs.

== Uniform and colors ==
For their inaugural American National Rugby League season the club adopted the colors of blue, black and white but their uniforms were predominantly blue. Their uniforms are similar in style to the Cronulla-Sutherland Sharks of Australia's National Rugby League, with whom they have a team partnership association. For the 2006 season the club changed their home kit to include a darker blue strip with predominantly black socks and shorts. In 2010, the club, along with other AMNRL teams, adopted a new badge.

== Stadium ==
The Sharks used Falls Township Community Park (alternatively referred to as Shark Park) as their home ground located in Levittown, Pennsylvania.

== Honors ==
- AMNRL Championship titles: 0

== See also ==
- Rugby league in the United States
- List of defunct rugby league clubs in the United States
