= Northern Raiders =

US defunct rugby league club, based in Congers, New York

New York Raiders

Club information
- Full name: New York Raiders; Rugby League Football Club
- Nickname: Raiders
- Founded: 2002; 23 years ago
- Exited: 2013; 12 years ago

Former details
- Ground: Rockland Lake State Park Congers, New York (2,500)
- CEO: Joel Venables
- Coach: Justin Coffman
- Captain: Joel Venables
- Competition: American National Rugby League

The New York Raiders were an American rugby league football team based in Congers, New York. The team played in the American National Rugby League (AMNRL) from 2002 to 2013, when the AMNRL folded its domestic competition.

The team originated as the Wilmington Vikings of Wilmington, Delaware, who joined the AMNRL as the league's first expansion team in 2002. Afterward the club experienced a series of moves and name changes; they relocated to New Jersey in 2003, becoming the New Jersey Vikings, then moved again after the season to upstate New York, taking the name Northern Raiders. In 2010 they adopted their current name. They made their first national playoff appearance in 2011 with the help of Dan Fullerton, Matt Vautin, Lesili Alovili, Rob Ploth, Phil Giuliano

== History ==
The team joined the American National Rugby League in 2002 as the Wilmington Vikings, based in Wilmington, Delaware. The AMNRL's first real expansion team, they brought the number of member franchises up to six. Like the other AMNRL teams, they started a team partnership with a club in Australia's National Rugby League (NRL), in this case the Canberra Raiders. They played in Wilmington for one season before relocating to Gloucester County, New Jersey in December 2002, changing their name to the New Jersey Vikings. They hoped the move would help them draw talent from Gloucester County College to overcome the recruitment problems they had faced in Delaware. Physician Merrick Wetzler took over as owner.

The move did not end the team's recruitment troubles, and following the 2003 season they relocated once more to upstate New York. In keeping with their partnership with the Canberra Raiders, they changed their name to the Northern Raiders. For the 2006 season they attempted to turn their losing record around, taking on Australian player-coach Ben Kelly; however, they just failed to qualify for the AMNRL playoff series. For a period they were based in Wallkill in Ulster County, New York, and play their home games at the Wallkill Airport Rugby Fields. In 2011 they relocated to Congers, New York and play in Rockland Lake State Park.

== Uniform and colors ==
For their inaugural American National Rugby League season the club adopted the colors of white, green and black but the uniforms they wear are predominantly white they have kept this uniform till this day. They are also part of an affiliate partnership with Australian NRL club the Canberra Raiders.

In 2010, the club, along with other AMNRL teams, adopted a new badge, replacing the one that had been modeled after that of the Canberra Raiders.

New York Raiders - logos

Until 2010

Initially for 2010

2010–2013

== Honors ==
- AMNRL Championship titles: 0

== Official sponsors ==
As announced in 2008 the main shirt sponsor for the then Northern Raiders RLFC became online accommodation specialists Wotif.com.

== See also ==
- Rugby league in the United States
- List of defunct rugby league clubs in the United States
