= List of defunct rugby league clubs in the United States =

Rugby league has been played in the United States by club teams since the 1970s. In that time a number of amateur and semi-professional clubs have been established and ended up going defunct.

== American National Rugby League ==
- Aston Bulls (1998–2013): Originally known as the Glen Mills Bulls and later the Pennsylvania Bulls, this club won 6 AMNRL championships.
- Boston Braves (2004–2006): The Braves were initially part of the Boston Irish Wolfhounds rugby union club and played exhibition games only. Upon becoming independent as the Braves, they played just one season in the AMNRL in 2006.
- Boston Storm (1998): This franchise played only one season in 1998.
- Delaware Valley Mantarays (2000–2006): Originating in Media, Pennsylvania as the Media Mantarays, the club folded into the Philadelphia Fight in 2006.
- Delaware Vipers (2011): Intended to be a relaunch of the Mantarays, the Vipers only lasted a single season in 2011.
- Iowa City Crash (2012–2013)
- Northern Raiders (2002–2013): The Raiders began as the Wilmington Vikings of Wilmington, Delaware and joined the AMNRL as the league's first expansion team in 2002. The club later experienced a series of moves and name changes, relocating to New Jersey in 2003, becoming the New Jersey Vikings, then moved again after the season to upstate New York, taking the name Northern Raiders. In 2010, they adopted their final name New York Raiders.
- Pennsylvania Raiders (1998): This club played just one season in 1998.
- Pittsburgh Vipers (2010–2011): This franchise only played a single season in the AMNRL before joining the USARL organisation as a development team under the Pittsburgh Sledgehammers branding.
- Southampton Dragons (2013): The Dragons played in the final season of the AMNRL, folding with the league at the conclusion of the 2013 season.

== USA Rugby League ==
- Baltimore Blues (2012–2014): The Blues joined the USARL as an expansion team in 2012, folding after just a couple of seasons.
- Bucks County Sharks (1997–2016): Known originally as the New Jersey Sharks before relocating to Bucks County, the Sharks played in the AMNRL before that league folded, joining the USARL for the 2015 season until the clubs departure in 2016.
- Central Florida Warriors (2014–2017): The Warriors were based in DeLand, Florida.
- Connecticut Wildcats (2003–2015): The Wildcats initially played in the AMNRL, winning 3 championships, before transferring to the USARL for only the 2015 season before folding. Most of the squad joined the new White Plains Wombats.
- New Haven Warriors (2006–2013): Warriors' initially played in the AMNRL, winning one championship. They became a founder member of the USARL in 2011.
- New Jersey Turnpike Titans (2011): The Titans only played in the leagues' inaugural season in 2011.
- New York Knights (1997–2018): Originally known as the New York Broncos, the Knights played in the AMNRL until the league folded. As with other clubs at the time, they switched over to the USARL for its 2015 season. The Knights had won 4 AMNRL championships.
- Oneida FC (2011–2013): Part of the historic Oneida Football Club, the rugby league division of Oneida only played in the USARL for a couple of seasons.
- Rhode Island Rebellion (2011–2017): The Rebellion were a founder member of the USARL.
- Washington D.C. Slayers (2003–2016): The Slayers were a founder member of the USARL, having initially played in the AMNRL.

== See also ==
- North American Rugby League
- List of defunct rugby league clubs
