= 2023 Rugby League European Championships =

European rugby league competition

The 2023 Rugby League European Championships was intended to be the 34th edition of the first division, Euro A, and 11th edition of the second division, Euro B, as well as the inaugural edition of the promotion and relegation era of the tournament after the cancellation of the planned first edition in 2020 due to the COVID-19 pandemic.

The tournament was officially postponed until an undefined date as a result of France withdrawing as hosts of the 2025 Rugby League World Cup, due to the tournament acting as the European qualifiers. However, with a new format European qualifications tournament for the replacement 2026 Men's Rugby League World Cup, the 2023 European Championships was informally cancelled.

In March 2025, the ERL announced the return of the tournament starting in October, thus officially canceling the 2023 edition.

== Euro A ==
2023 European Championship
- Number of teams: 8
- Matches played: 13

The 2023 Rugby League European Championship was intended to be the 34th edition of the Rugby League European Championship, and the inaugural edition of the promotion and relegation era of the tournament after the cancellation of the planned first edition in 2020 due to the COVID-19 pandemic.

On 25 May 2023, the European Rugby League (ERL) announced that the tournament would be postponed due to France withdrawing as hosts of the 2025 Rugby League World Cup, this was as the competition acted as a World Cup qualification tournament for Europe. The tournament was scheduled October and November 2023.

=== Format ===
The tournament was to act as qualification for 2025 Rugby League World Cup.

The eight teams of the tournament will be split into two groups of four and each play a single round robin. The top team from each group of Euro A will contest the final and were to automatically qualify for the World Cup. Group runners-up were to contest a playoff with the winners of the Euro B group winners for the final two European World Cup places.

France (as hosts) and England (as 2021 knock-out stage participants) had qualified for the World Cup so if either of these teams had finished in a qualification spot, the next highest team in the group would gain qualification rights.

==== England schedule clash ====
After the fixture list was released, the Rugby Football League (RFL) announced that England would play Tonga in a three-match home test series, the dates of which coincide with the European fixtures. The RFL had already decided that the England team for the European Championships would be led by England Knights head coach, Paul Anderson, and not England head coach, Shaun Wane. As the Championships are an international tournament, sanctioned by the Rugby League International Federation, England's matches are classed as full England internationals, not Knights' fixtures.

=== Teams ===
Team	Qualified as	Qualified on	Previous appearances in tournament (last) (Note: Bold indicates champion for that year.)
England	Tournament Return	22 November 2022	29 (2004)
France	Original 2020 Team	22 November 2022	31 (2018)
Ireland	Original 2020 Team	22 November 2022	8 (2018)
Italy	Original 2020 Team	22 November 2022	1 (2009)
Scotland	Original 2020 Team	22 November 2022	8 (2018)
Serbia	Promoted from 2021 Euro B	22 November 2022	1 (2009)
Spain	Original 2020 Team	22 November 2022	0 (debut)
Wales	Original 2020 Team	22 November 2022	31 (2018)

=== Group stage ===
The draw for the tournament was made on 22 February 2023 in Huddersfield by Lisa McIntosh and Michelle Hargreaves. The tournament scheduled was confirmed on 31 March.

==== Group A ====
Pos	Team	Pld	W	D	L	PF	PA	PD	Pts	Qualification
1	England (Note: As England and France have already qualified for the 2025 Rugby League World Cup they are ineligible to take tournament qualification spots.)	0	0	0	0	0	0	0	0	Advance to Final
2	Ireland	0	0	0	0	0	0	0	0	Qualify for 2025 World Cup
3	Scotland	0	0	0	0	0	0	0	0	Qualify for 2024 European Repêchage
4	Serbia	0	0	0	0	0	0	0	0	Relegated to Euro B

Updated to match(es) played on unknown. Source:

England	v	Ireland
	Source

England

Scotland	v	Serbia
	Source

Scotland

Scotland	v	England
	Source

Scotland

Serbia	v	Ireland
	Source

Serbia

Serbia	v	England
	Source

Serbia

Ireland	v	Scotland
	Source

Ireland

==== Group B ====
Pos	Team	Pld	W	D	L	PF	PA	PD	Pts	Qualification
1	France	0	0	0	0	0	0	0	0	Advance to Final
2	Italy	0	0	0	0	0	0	0	0	Qualify for 2025 World Cup
3	Spain	0	0	0	0	0	0	0	0	Qualify for 2024 European Repêchage
4	Wales	0	0	0	0	0	0	0	0	Relegated to Euro B

Updated to match(es) played on unknown. Source:

Spain	v	Wales
	Source

Spain

France	v	Italy
	Source

France

France	v	Spain
	Source

France

Italy	v	Wales
	Source

Italy

Wales	v	France
	Source

Wales

Italy	v	Spain
	Source

Italy

=== Final ===
Group A Winner	v	Group B Winner
	Source

France

== Euro B ==
2023 European Championship B
- Number of teams: 6
- Matches played: 7

The 2023 European Championship B was intended to be the 11th edition of the second tier of the Rugby League European Championship.

On 25 May 2023, the European Rugby League (ERL) announced that the tournament would be postponed due to France withdrawing as hosts of the 2025 Rugby League World Cup, this was as the competition acted as a World Cup qualification tournament for Europe. The tournament was scheduled October and November 2023.

=== Format ===
The tournament was to act as qualification for 2025 Rugby League World Cup.

The six teams of the tournament will be split into two groups of three and each play a single round robin. The top team from each group of Euro B will contest the final, and would originally enter a playoff with one of the group runners up from Euro A groups for a spot in the World Cup.

=== Teams ===
The tournament will consist of the Czech Republic, Germany, Greece, Netherlands, Norway and Ukraine.

Russia was originally part of the competition, but as they remained suspended due to the ongoing Russo-Ukrainian War. Czech Republic, who were the runners-up from 2021 Euro D Championship, replaced them in the tournament.

Team	Qualified as	Qualified on	Previous appearances in tournament (Note: Bold indicates champion for that year.)
Czech Republic	Invited	22 November 2022	4 (2007, 2008, 2009, 2010)
Germany	Invited	22 November 2022	7 (2006, 2007, 2008, 2009, 2010, 2011, 2012–13)
Greece	Invited	22 November 2022	0 (debut)
Netherlands	Invited	22 November 2022	0 (debut)
Norway	Invited	22 November 2022	1 (2011)
Ukraine	Invited	22 November 2022	3 (2010, 2014–15, 2021)

=== Group stage ===
Fixtures were announced on 28 October 2022.

==== Group A ====
Due to the Russian invasion of Ukraine, both of Ukraine's group stage matches were played away.

Pos	Team	Pld	W	D	L	PF	PA	PD	Pts	Qualification
1	Greece	0	0	0	0	0	0	0	0	Advance to Final, qualify for 2024 European Repêchage, and promoted to Euro A
2	Norway	0	0	0	0	0	0	0	0	
3	Ukraine	0	0	0	0	0	0	0	0	

Updated to match(es) played on unknown. Source: ERL

Ukraine	v	Norway
	Source

Norway (Note: Despite the Ukraine vs Norway match being a home game for Ukraine, it will be played in Norway due to the ongoing Russo-Ukrainian War.)

Greece	v	Ukraine
	Source

Greece

Norway	v	Greece
	Source

Norway

==== Group B ====
Pos	Team	Pld	W	D	L	PF	PA	PD	Pts	Qualification
1	Czech Republic	0	0	0	0	0	0	0	0	Advance to Final, qualify for 2024 European Repêchage, and promoted to Euro A
2	Germany	0	0	0	0	0	0	0	0	
3	Netherlands	0	0	0	0	0	0	0	0	

Updated to match(es) played on unknown. Source: ERL

Germany	v	Czech Republic
	Source

Germany

Czech Republic	v	Netherlands
	Source

Czech Republic

Netherlands	v	Germany
	Source

The British School, Voorschoten

=== Final ===
Group A Winner	v	Group B Winner
	Source
