= Rugby League European Championship B =

Sports competition

European Championship B
- Current season, competition or edition: 2026 Rugby League European Championships
- Sport: Rugby league
- Founded: 2006; 20 years ago
- Organising body: European Rugby League
- No. of teams: 3
- Country: Europe
- Most recent champion: Netherlands (1st title)
- Most titles: Serbia (5 titles)
- Level on pyramid: 2
- Promotion to: European Championship A
- Relegation to: European Championship C

The European Championship B (formerly the European Shield), is a rugby league football competition. The competition is organised by the European Rugby League and is the second tier of the European Championship competition. It was first held in 2006 as the Central Europe Development Tri-Nations.

== History ==
The competition was first held in 2006 under the name of Central Europe Development Tri Nations, with the aim of developing teams in central and eastern Europe. Up until 2009 the competition was made up of only three teams, until it was expanded in 2010 to six teams split into two conferences - East and West. In 2011 the competition was reverted back to three teams with Norway and Malta making their debuts. The competition was expanded again the year after though with four teams playing in winter between 2012–13. This was repeated again in the 2014–15 edition of the competition and was used for qualification for the 2017 World Cup. The 2018 competition was the last year of its current incarnation after a two-year hiatus. In 2020, it was announced promotion and relegation would be introduced with three teams in each division, expanding to six for 2023, with the top team being promoted and the bottom relegated.

In March 2025, the European Rugby League (ERL) announced the return of the tournament for Euro B, C, and D, with the competition returning to a three team per division competition. Competing nations were reseeded based on Rank, with the 2025 and 2026 tournaments confirmed. The ERL stated its aim to restart Euro A in 2027 following the 2026 Men's Rugby League World Cup, with the top European teams unable to join earlier due to commitments in the qualification tournament for the World Cup.

== Team appearances ==
Team	Appearances	Debut	Most recent	Best result
Germany	7	2006	2013	Champions (2006, 2011)
Serbia	7	2010	2026	Champions (2007, 2010 West, 2014–15, 2020, 2025)
Russia	5	2010	2020	Champions (2010 East, 2012–13, 2018)
Czech Republic	4	2007	2010	Runners-up (2009)
Italy	4	2008	2013	Champions (2008, 2009)
Ukraine	4	2010	2026	Runners-up (2014–15, 2020, 2026)
Austria	1	2006	2006	Runners-up (2006)
Estonia	1	2006	2006	Third place (2006)
Latvia	1	2010	2010	Third place (2010 East)
Malta	1	2011	2011	Runners-up (2011)
Norway	1	2011	2011	Third place (2006)
Spain	1	2018	2018	Runners-up (2018)
Netherlands	2	2025	2026	Champions (2026)

== Results ==
Year		Champions	Runners-up	Third place	Fourth place	Number of teams
2006; Details		Germany	Austria	Estonia	–	3
2007; Details		Serbia	Germany	Czech Republic	–	3
2008; Details		Italy	Germany	Czech Republic	–	3
2009; Details		Italy	Czech Republic	Germany	–	3
2010; Details	West	Serbia	Germany	Czech Republic	–	3
2010; Details	East	Russia	Ukraine	Latvia	–	3
2011; Details		Germany	Malta	Norway	–	3
2012–13; Details		Russia	Italy	Serbia	Germany	4
2014–15; Details		Serbia	Russia	Italy	Ukraine	4
2018; Details		Russia	Spain	Serbia	–	3
2021; Details		Serbia	Ukraine	Russia	–	3
2025; Details		Serbia	Netherlands	Malta	–	3
2026; Details		Netherlands	Ukraine	Serbia	–	3

== Summary ==
Team	Champions	Runners-up	Third place	Fourth place
Serbia	5 (2007, 2010 West, 2014–15, 2020, 2025)	—	2 (2018, 2026)	—
Russia	3 (2010 East, 2012–13, 2018)	1 (2014–15)	1 (2020)	—
Italy	2 (2008, 2009)	1 (2012–13)	1 (2014–15)	—
Germany	2 (2006, 2011)	3 (2007, 2008, 2010 West)	1 (2009)	1 (2012–13)
Netherlands	1 (2026)	1 (2025)		—
Czech Republic	—	1 (2009)	3 (2007, 2008, 2010 West)	—
Ukraine	—	3 (2010 East, 2020, 2026)	—	1 (2012–13)
Austria	—	1 (2006)	—	—
Malta	—	1 (2011)	1 (2025)	—
Spain	—	1 (2018)	—	—
Estonia	—	—	1 (2006)	
Latvia	—	—	1 (2010 East)	—
Norway	—	—	1 (2011)	—

== See also ==
- Rugby League European Championship A
- Rugby League European Championship C
- Rugby League European Championship D
- Women's Rugby League European Championship
- Wheelchair Rugby League European Championship
