= List of Italy national rugby league team results =

The following is a list of results for the Italy national rugby league team since their first match in 1950. Matches marked with a † are not included in the results table as they were not sanctioned by the Rugby League International Federation. The matches were either not played by two RLIF-recognised national teams, or were played with modified rules (often an extended bench and unlimited interchanges).

== All time record ==
Opponent	Played	Won	Lost	Drawn	Win %	For	Aga	Diff
Australia	3	0	3	0	0.00	43	170	-127
Canada	1	1	0	0	100.00	66	6	+60
Czech Republic	2	2	0	0	100.00	76	26	+50
Fiji	2	0	2	0	0.00	14	98	-84
France	1	0	1	0	0.00	14	10	-4
Germany	4	4	0	0	100.00	238	96	+142
Greece	2	2	0	0	100.00	84	38	+46
Ireland	2	0	2	0	0.00	16	61	-45
Lebanon	5	0	4	1	0.00	61	163	-102
Malta	1	1	1	1	33.33	82	59	+23
Morocco	1	1	0	0	100.00	34	0	+34
Niue	1	1	0	0	100.00	36	32	+4
Russia	6	4	2	0	66.67	252	100	+152
Scotland	3	1	1	1	33.33	58	138	-86
Serbia	8	4	4	0	50.00	216	196	+20
South Africa	4	2	2	0	50.00	94	164	-70
Spain	2	2	0	0	100.00	128	8	+120
Tonga	1	0	1	0	0.00	0	16	-16
Ukraine	3	2	0	1	50.00	114	68	+46
United States	2	2	0	0	100.00	86	16	+70
Wales	2	1	1	0	50.00	46	36	+10
Total	57	30	24	3	52.63	1737	1467	+270

== Matches ==
=== Italian Federation of Amateur Rugby 13 ===
Date	Home	Result	Away	Competition	Venue	Attendance
26 August 1950†	Wigan	49 – 28	Italy	1950 Italy tour	Central Park, Wigan	14,000
30 August 1950†	St Helens	74 – 38	Italy	1950 Italy tour	Knowsley Road, St Helens	14,000
2 September 1950†	South Wales	29 – 11	Italy	1950 Italy tour	Brewery Field, Bridgend	2,500
6 September 1950†	Huddersfield	28 – 12	Italy	1950 Italy tour	Fartown, Huddersfield	3,737
9 September 1950†	Leigh	58 – 15	Italy	1950 Italy tour	Hilton Park, Leigh	6,500
11 September 1950†	Leeds	56 – 41	Italy	1950 Italy tour	Heaingley, Leeds	8,500
15 April 1951†	France Amateurs	29 – 17	Italy	Friendly	Cahors	
7 April 1954†	Bradford Northern	67 – 18	Italy	1954 Italy tour	Odsal Stadium, Bradford	7,000
10 April 1954†	York	54 – 17	Italy	1954 Italy tour	Clarence Street, York	4,000
14 April 1954†	Hunslet	40 – 23	Italy	1954 Italy tour	Parkside, Hunslet	3,300
16 April 1954†	France Amateurs	20 – 6	Italy	1954 Italy tour	Fartown, Huddersfield	3,737
19 April 1954†	England Amateurs	18 – 11	Italy	1954 Italy tour	Thrum Hall, Halifax	2,000
20 April 1954†	Keighley	57 – 27	Italy	1954 Italy tour	Lawkholme Lane, Keighley	3,500
21 April 1954†	Leigh	35 – 7	Italy	1954 Italy tour	Hilton Park, Leigh	5,000
23 January 1960	Italy	15 – 37	Australia	1959–60 Kangaroo Tour	Stadio Euganeo, Padua	3,500
24 January 1960	Italy	22 – 67	Australia	1959–60 Kangaroo Tour	Stadio Omobono Tenni, Treviso	3,105

=== Italia Rugby League ===
Date	Home	Result	Away	Competition	Venue	Attendance
11 November 1999	Italy	16 – 36	Lebanon	1999 Mediterranean Cup	Stade Jean-Laffon, Perpignan	
14 November 1999	Italy	34 – 0	Morocco	1999 Mediterranean Cup	Stade des Minimes, Toulouse	
17 November 1999	France	14 – 10	Italy	1999 Mediterranean Cup	Parc des Sports, Avignon	1,000
15 November 2000	Canada	6 – 66	Italy	2000 Emerging Nations Tournament	Cougar Park, Keighley	
17 November 2000	Italy	40 – 16	United States	2000 Emerging Nations Tournament	The Shay, Halifax	
20 November 2000†	BARLA	64 – 0	Italy	2000 Emerging Nations Tournament	Crown Flatt, Dewsbury	
17 July 2002†	Italy	12 – 16	Kazan Arrows (Tatarstan)	Padova Cup	Stadio Plebiscito, Padua	500
21 July 2002†	Italy	16 – 16	Scotland Students	Padova Cup	Stadio Plebiscito, Padua	
11 July 2003†	Italy	10 – 30	Scotland A	Scotland A tour of Europe	Stadio Plebiscito, Padua	
27 September 2003	Greece	24 – 26	Italy	Ionio Cup	Kogarah Jubilee Oval, Sydney	3,000
2 October 2004	Greece	14 – 58	Italy	Ionio Cup	Marconi Stadium, Sydney	2,000
4 June 2006†	Italy A	34 – 6	United States	Columbus Cup	Parramatta Stadium, Sydney	2,000
9 June 2006†	Italy	12 – 38	BARLA B	Friendly	Stadio Simone Franchini, Monselice	
12 June 2006	Italy	6 – 76	South Africa			
13 June 2006	Italy	20 – 60	South Africa			
19 June 2007†	Italy	16 – 42	BARLA under-23	Friendly	Stadio Simone Franchini, Monselice	
21 June 2007†	Italy	4 – 60	BARLA under-23	Friendly	Stadio Simone Franchini, Monselice	

=== Federazione Italia Rugby League ===
Date	Home	Result	Away	Competition	Venue	Attendance
11 June 2008†	Italy	0 – 64	BARLA under-23	Friendly	Stadio Simone Franchini, Monselice	
13 June 2008	Italy	58 – 26	Germany	2008 European Shield	Stadio Plebiscito, Padua	
12 July 2008	Czech Republic	18 – 38	Italy	2008 European Shield	RK Petrovice, Prague	
11 July 2009	Italy	38 – 8	Czech Republic	2009 European Shield	Stadio Antiche Mura, Jesolo	
18 July 2009	Germany	30 – 42	Italy	2009 European Shield	Huerth Stadion, Cologne	2,000
17 October 2009	Italy	0 – 104	Scotland	2009 European Cup	Stadio Plebiscito, Padua	2,179
24 October 2009	Lebanon	86 – 0	Italy	2009 European Cup	International Olympic Stadium, Tripoli	500
8 November 2009	Italy	42 – 14	Serbia	2009 European Cup	Llynfi Road, Bridgend	1,200
10 September 2010†	Italy	8 – 16	Lebanon	Friendly	Stadio Simone Franchini, Monselice	
27 September 2010†	Italy	24 – 16	Lebanon	Friendly	Stadio Plebiscito, Padua	
6 October 2010†	Wales	6 – 13	Italy	Friendly	Racecourse Ground, Wrexham	2,971
15 October 2011	Italy	92 – 6	Russia	2013 World Cup qualifying	Stadio Plebiscito, Padua	2,100
23 October 2011	Serbia	6 – 52	Italy	2013 World Cup qualifying	Makiš Stadium, Belgrade	
29 October 2011	Italy	19 – 19	Lebanon	2013 World Cup qualifying	Makiš Stadium, Belgrade	
9 June 2012	Serbia	24 – 18	Italy	2012–13 European Shield	Makiš Stadium, Belgrade	
7 July 2012	Italy	72 – 10	Germany	2012–13 European Shield	Stadio Beltrametti, Piacenza	
8 September 2012	Russia	32 – 18	Italy	2012–13 European Shield	SK Nara Stadium, Naro-Fominsk	300
29 June 2013	Italy	38 – 18	Russia	2012–13 European Shield	Stadio Augusteo, Este	
27 July 2013	Germany	30 – 66	Italy	2012–13 European Shield	Nordstern Stadion, Karlsruhe	
14 September 2013	Italy	32 – 20	Serbia	2012–13 European Shield	Stadio Augusteo, Este	
19 October 2013†	England	14 – 15	Italy	Friendly	Salford City Stadium, Salford	
26 October 2013	Wales	16 – 32	Italy	2013 World Cup	Millennium Stadium, Cardiff	45,052
3 November 2013	Scotland	30 – 30	Italy	2013 World Cup	Derwent Park, Workington	7,280
10 November 2013	Tonga	16 – 0	Italy	2013 World Cup	The Shay, Halifax	10,666
5 July 2014	Italy	54 – 12	Ukraine	2014–15 European Championship B	Stadio Comunale, Gemona del Friuli	
26 July 2014	Italy	22 – 18	Russia	2014–15 European Championship B	Stadio Comunale, Gemona del Friuli	
10 September 2014	Serbia	45 – 6	Italy	2014–15 European Championship B	Makiš Stadium, Belgrade	
20 June 2015	Italy	14 – 21	Serbia	2014–15 European Championship B	Stadio Comunale, Gemona del Friuli	
18 July 2015	Ukraine	12 – 40	Italy	2014–15 European Championship B	National University, Irpin	
12 September 2015	Russia	26 – 6	Italy	2014–15 European Championship B	Fili Stadium, Moscow	1,200
19 September 2015†	Spain	36 – 24	Italy B	Friendly	Llometa Stadium, Muro de Alcoy	1,200
12 June 2016	Italy	22 – 26	Lebanon	2016 Mediterranean Cup	Centro Universitario Sportivo, Catania	
3 September 2016†	Italy	26 – 60	Ireland	Friendly	Comunale Palazzolo, Brescia	1,500
22 October 2016	Serbia	14 – 62	Italy	2017 World Cup qualifying	Makiš Stadium, Belgrade	1,037
29 October 2016	Italy	14 – 20	Wales	2017 World Cup qualifying	Stadio Brianteo, Monza	839
4 November 2016	Italy	76 – 0	Russia	2017 World Cup qualifying	Leigh Sports Village, Leigh	1,100
3 June 2017	Lebanon	6 – 4	Italy	2017 Mediterranean Cup	Universite Libanais, Beirut	
10 June 2017	Italy	94 – 4	Spain	Test match	Campo Sportivo Manta, Saluzzo	
8 October 2017	Malta	24 – 24	Italy	Test match	Marconi Stadium, Sydney	
20 October 2017†	Italy	6 – 16	Tonga	Friendly	Callendar Park, Innisfail	
29 October 2017	Ireland	36 – 12	Italy	2017 World Cup	Barlow Park, Cairns	9,216
5 November 2017	Italy	46 – 0	United States	2017 World Cup	Willows Sports Complex, Townsville	7,732
10 November 2017	Fiji	38 – 10	Italy	2017 World Cup	Canberra Stadium, Canberra	6,733
12 October 2018	Italy	18 – 8	South Africa	Test match	Kellyville Ridge Reserve, Sydney	220
27 October 2018	Niue	32 – 36	Italy	Test match	Marconi Stadium, Sydney	250
12 October 2019	Malta	23 – 20	Italy	Test match	Kirkham Oval, Sydney	1,200
19 October 2019	Philippines	16 – 46	Italy	Test match	Windsor Sports Complex, Sydney	
2 November 2019	Italy	34 – 4	Spain	2021 World Cup qualifying	Stadio Communale Teghil, Lignano Sabbiadoro	
9 November 2019	Ireland	25 – 4	Italy	2021 World Cup qualifying	Morton Stadium, Dublin	
16 October 2022	Scotland	4 – 28	Italy	2021 World Cup	Kingston Park, Newcastle	
22 October 2022	Fiji	60 – 4	Italy	2021 World Cup	Kingston Park, Newcastle	
29 October 2022	Australia	66 – 6	Italy	2021 World Cup	Totally Wicked Stadium, St Helens	
27 May 2023	Italy	4 – 52	Serbia	Test Match	Pasian di Prato Stadium, Udine	
7 October 2023	Italy	38 – 12	Malta	Test Match	Lidcombe Oval, Sydney	
28 October 2023	Italy	50 – 20	South Africa	Test Match	Lidcombe Oval, Sydney	
28 September 2024	Italy	0 – 42	Malta	Test Match	A.S.D. Juvenilia, Bagnaria Arsa	
4 October 2025	Italy	16–14	Lebanon	Test Match	Lidcombe Oval, Sydney	
18 October 2025	Italy	20 – 44	Ukraine	2025 Euro C Championships	Pasian di Prato Stadium, Udine	
25 October 2025	Italy	14–36	Greece	2025 Euro C Championships	Pasian di Prato Stadium, Udine	
17 October 2026	Norway	6 – 40	Italy	2026 Euro D Championships	Øster Hus Arena, Sandnes	
24 October 2026	Italy	46–38	Czech Republic	2026 Euro D Championships	Abbiategrasso Rugby Club, Abbiategrasso	
