= Rugby League European Championship D =

International rugby tournament

European Championship D
- Current season, competition or edition: 2026 Rugby League European Championships
- Sport: Rugby league
- Founded: 2020; 6 years ago
- Organising body: European Rugby League
- No. of teams: 4
- Country: Europe
- Most recent champions: Netherlands (1st title)
- Most titles: Netherlands (1 title)
- Level on pyramid: 4
- Promotion to: European Championship C

European Championship D is the fourth tier of the rugby league European Championships and was founded in 2020.

== History ==
The inaugural tournament was in 2021. The competition was intended to be scrapped in 2023 due to expansion of Euro A and Euro B, however this never materialised.

In March 2025, the European Rugby League (ERL) announced the return of the tournament for Euro B, C, and D, with the competition returning to a three team per division competition. Competing nations were reseeded based on Rank, with the 2025 and 2026 tournaments confirmed. Promotion and relegation would also be introduced with the 2025 champions being promoted to Euro C and its last placed side being relegated to the 2026 Euro D tournament. The ERL stated its aim to restart Euro A in 2027 following the 2026 Men's Rugby League World Cup, with the top European teams unable to join earlier due to commitments in the qualification tournament for the World Cup.

== Team appearances ==
Team	Appearances	Debut	Most recent	Best result
Czech Republic	2	2021	2025	Runners-up (2021)
Germany	1	2025	2025	Champions (2025)
Malta	1	2021	2021	Fourth place (2021)
Netherlands	1	2021	2021	Champions (2021)
Norway	1	2025	2025	Runners-up (2025)
Turkey	1	2021	2021	Third place (2021)

== Results ==
Year	Champions	Runners-up	Third place	Fourth place	Number of teams
2021; Details	Netherlands	Czech Republic	Turkey	Malta	4
2025; Details	Germany	Norway	Czech Republic	—	3

== Summary ==
Team	Champions	Runners-up	Third place	Fourth place
Netherlands	1 (2021)	—	—	—
Germany	1 (2025)	—	—	—
Czech Republic	—	1 (2021)	1 (2025)	—
Norway	—	1 (2026)	—	—
Turkey	—	—	1 (2021)	—
Malta	—	—	—	1 (2021)

== See also ==
- Rugby League European Championship A
- Rugby League European Championship B
- Rugby League European Championship C
- Women's Rugby League European Championship
- Wheelchair Rugby League European Championship
