= List of rugby league tours =

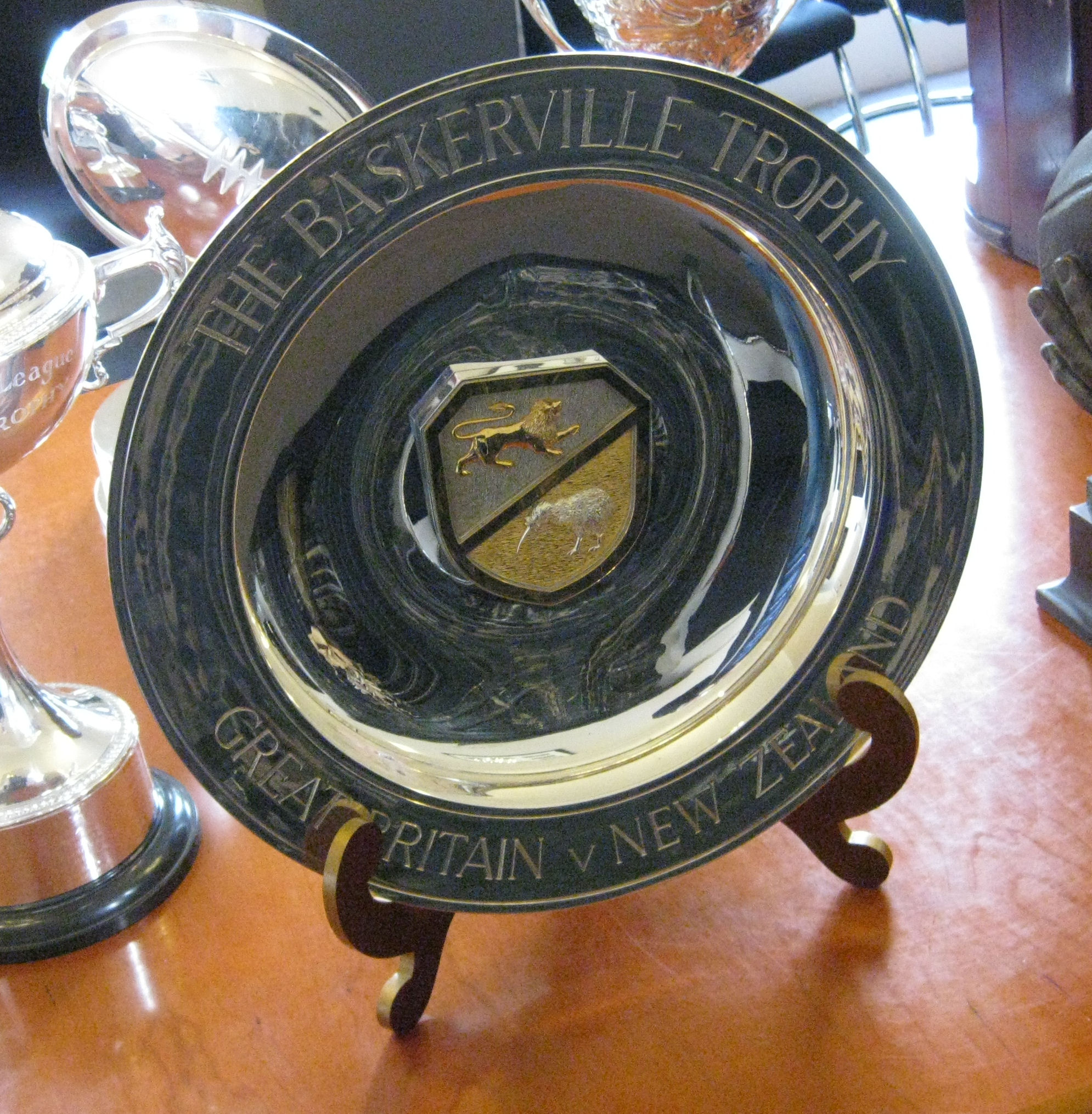
The Baskerville Shield is usually competed for during Lions and Kiwi tours to New Zealand and Great Britain respectively

Rugby league tours are a series of matches in the sport of rugby league against multiple opponents from one geographic area.

Numerous tours have occurred throughout history and have been mostly carried out by the top three rugby league nations Australia (Kangaroos), Great Britain (Lions), and New Zealand (All Blacks/Kiwis).

Tours historically consisted of a number of non-test matches against club or composite teams and single-match tests against national sides, before a three-game test series against the national side of the tour's primary destination. These three-game test series were the primary event of the tours and would often be their own competition, the most famous being The Ashes. More modern tours have often skipped non-test matches to play only the "primary event".

While the phrase "traditional era" and "modern era" have no set definition in rugby league and can vary massively depending on the context. No tours of any kind occurred between 2007 (coincidentally 100 years after the first tour) and 2015, the largest time without a tour in peace time. As a result 2015 can be considered the start of the modern era for tours. It was at this time when the majority of tours only saw a three-game test series with a single nation.

Prior to 1954 and the first Rugby League World Cup, tours were the main form of international competition in the sport.

This article lists all elite level tours undertaken by national teams:

== Lions tours ==
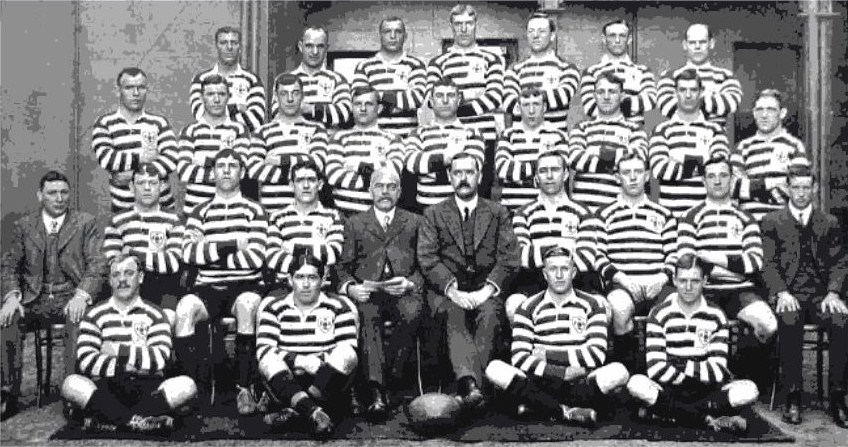

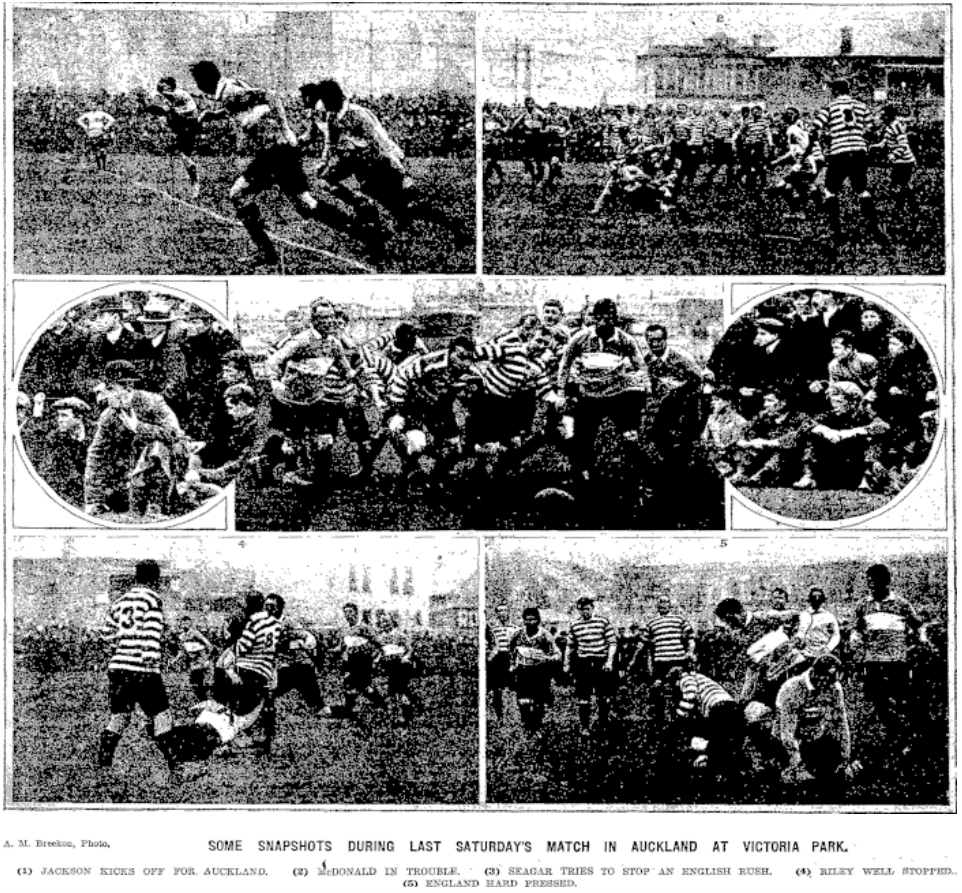
Great Britain playing Auckland during their first tour to New Zealand, with their touring squad above

=== Great Britain era ===
- 1910 Lions tour of Australia and New Zealand
- 1914 Lions tour of Australia and New Zealand
- 1920 Lions tour of Australia and New Zealand
- 1924 Lions tour of Australia and New Zealand
- 1928 Lions tour of Australia and New Zealand
- 1932 Lions tour of Australia and New Zealand
- 1936 Lions tour of Australia and New Zealand
- 1946 Lions tour of Australia and New Zealand
- 1950 Lions tour of Australia and New Zealand
- 1954 Lions tour of Australia and New Zealand
- 1958 Lions tour of Australia and New Zealand
- 1962 Lions tour of Australia, New Zealand, and South Africa
- 1966 Lions tour of Australia and New Zealand
- 1970 Lions tour of Australia and New Zealand
- 1974 Lions tour of Australia and New Zealand
- 1979 Lions tour of Australia and New Zealand
- 1984 Lions tour of Australia, Papua New Guinea, and New Zealand
- 1988 Lions tour of Australia, Papua New Guinea, and New Zealand
- 1990 Lions tour of Australia and New Zealand
- 1992 Lions tour of Australia, Papua New Guinea, and New Zealand
- 1996 Lions tour of Fiji, Papua New Guinea, and New Zealand
- 2019 Lions tour of Papua New Guinea and New Zealand

== Kangaroo tours ==
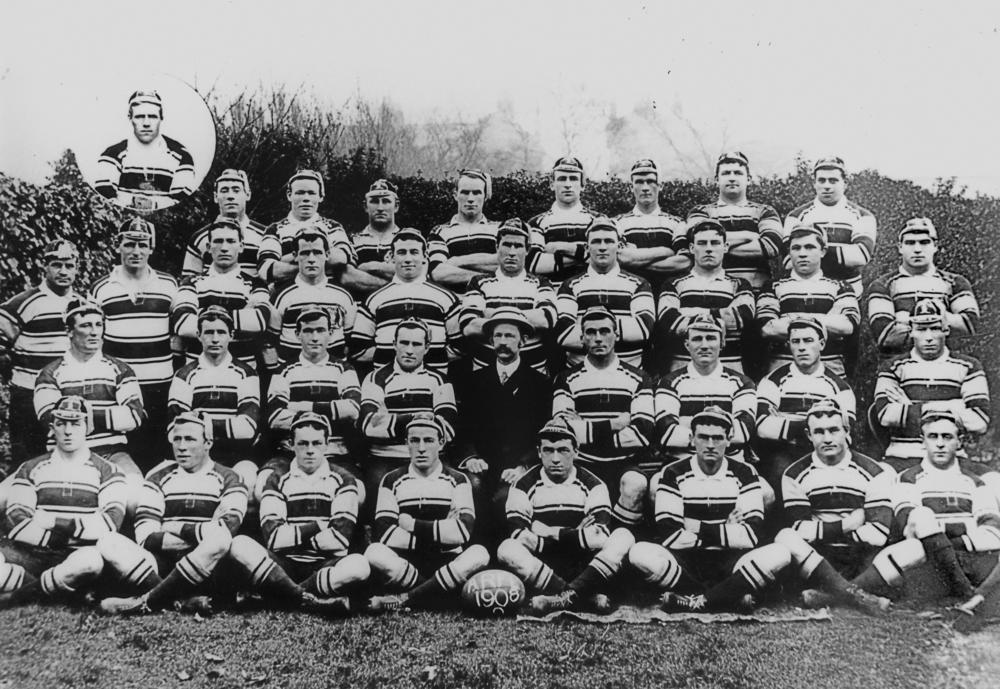
The Kangaroo team during their first tour to Great Britain

- 1908–09 Kangaroo tour of Great Britain
- 1911–12 Kangaroo tour of Great Britain
- 1919 Kangaroo tour of New Zealand
- 1921–22 Kangaroo tour of Great Britain
- 1929–30 Kangaroo tour of Great Britain
- 1933–34 Kangaroo tour of Great Britain
- 1935 Kangaroo tour of New Zealand
- 1937–38 Kangaroo tour of New Zealand, Great Britain, and France
- 1948–49 Kangaroo tour of Great Britain and France
- 1949 Kangaroo tour of New Zealand
- 1952–53 Kangaroo tour of Great Britain and France
- 1953 Kangaroo tour of New Zealand
- 1956–57 Kangaroo tour of Great Britain and France
- 1959–60 Kangaroo tour of Great Britain, France, and Italy
- 1961 Kangaroo tour of New Zealand
- 1963–64 Kangaroo tour of Great Britain and France
- 1965 Kangaroo tour of New Zealand
- 1967–68 Kangaroo tour of Great Britain and France
- 1969 Kangaroo tour of New Zealand
- 1971 Kangaroo tour of New Zealand
- 1973 Kangaroo tour of Great Britain and France
- 1978 Kangaroo tour of Great Britain and France
- 1980 Kangaroo tour of New Zealand
- 1982 Kangaroo tour of Great Britain and France
- 1985 Kangaroo tour of New Zealand
- 1986 Kangaroo tour of Great Britain and France
- 1989 Kangaroo tour of New Zealand
- 1990 Kangaroo tour of Great Britain and France
- 1991 Kangaroo tour of Papua New Guinea
- 1994 Kangaroo tour of Great Britain and France
- 2001 Kangaroo tour of Great Britain
- 2003 Kangaroo tour of Great Britain

- 2020 Kangaroo tour of England (Cancelled due to the COVID-19 pandemic)
- 2025 Kangaroo tour of England
- 2028 Kangaroo tour of England

== Kiwi tours ==
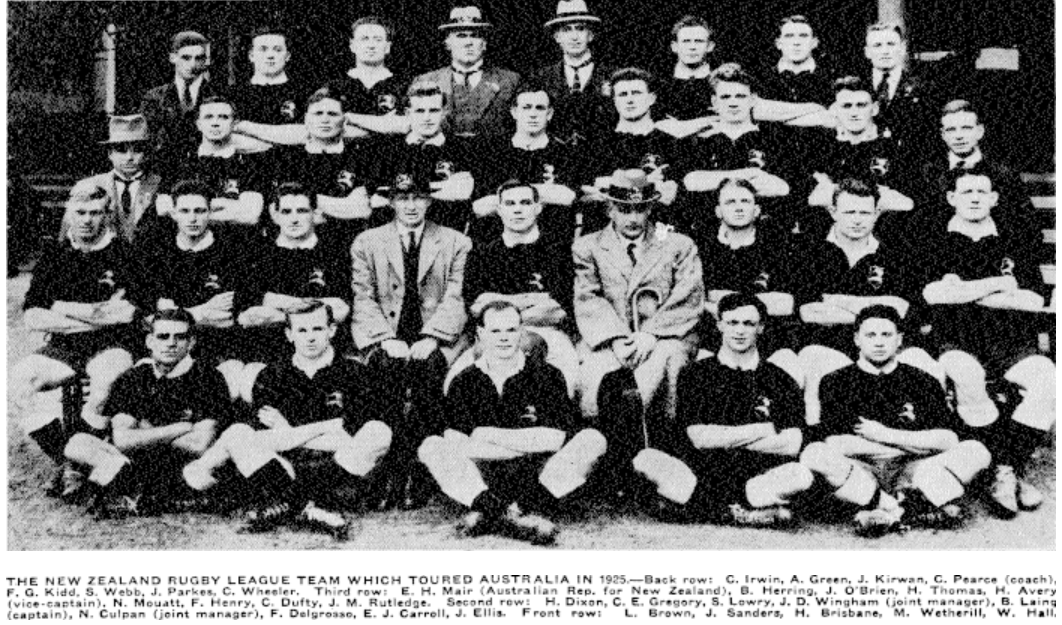
The Kiwi team that toured Australia in 1925

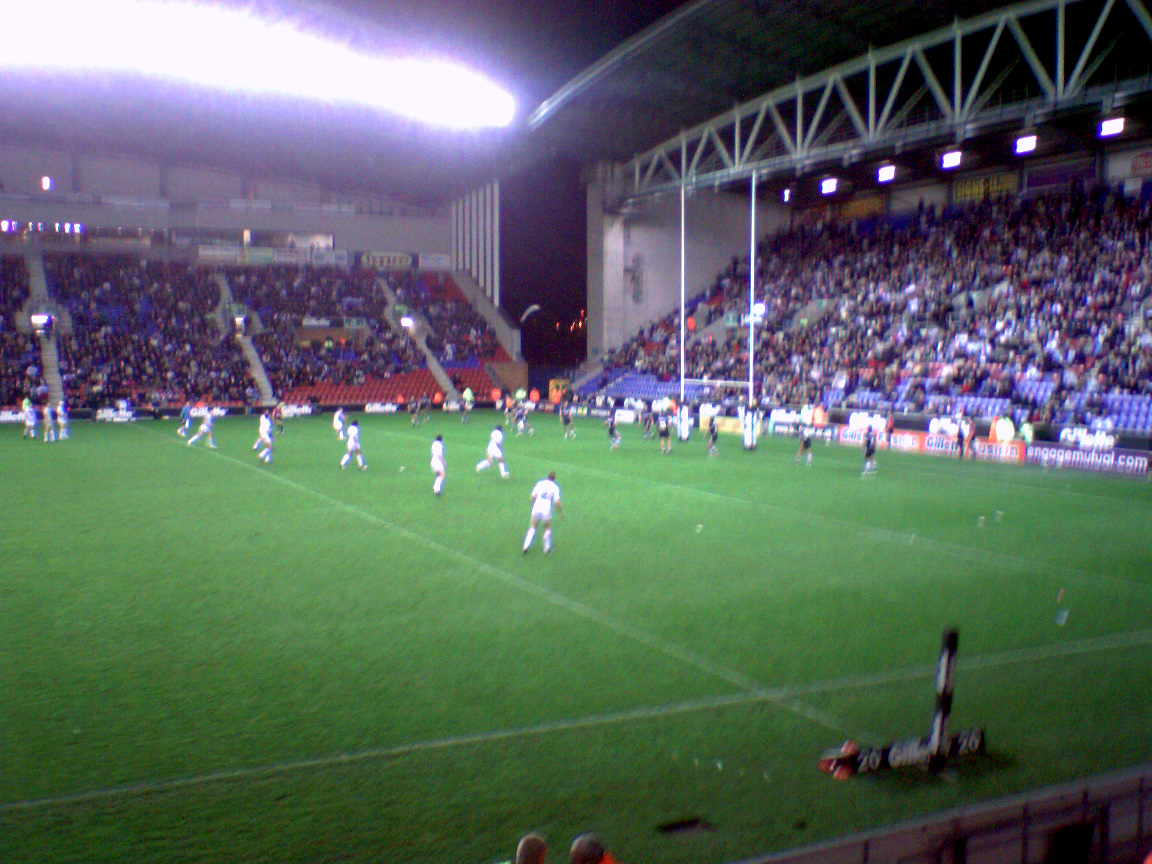
New Zealand playing third test against Great Britain at the DW Stadium on their 2007 tour to the country which celebrated 100 years of rugby league in New Zealand

- 1907–1908 All Golds tour of Australia and Great Britain
- 1909 All Blacks tour of Australia
- 1911 All Blacks tour of Australia
- 1912 All Blacks tour of Australia
- 1913 All Blacks tour of Australia
- 1919 All Blacks tour of Australia
- 1921 All Blacks tour of Australia
- 1925 All Blacks tour of Australia
- 1926–1927 Kiwi tour of Great Britain
- 1930 Kiwi tour of Australia
- 1938 Kiwi tour of Australia
- 1939 Kiwi tour of Great Britain and France (Cancelled due to the Second World War)
- 1947–1948 Kiwi tour of Great Britain and France
- 1948 Kiwi tour of Australia
- 1951–1952 Kiwi tour of Great Britain and France
- 1952 Kiwi tour of Australia
- 1955–1956 Kiwi tour of Great Britain and France
- 1956 Kiwi tour of Australia
- 1959 Kiwi tour of Australia
- 1961 Kiwi tour of Great Britain and France
- 1963 Kiwi tour of Australia
- 1965 Kiwi tour of Great Britain and France
- 1967 Kiwi tour of Australia
- 1971 Kiwi tour of Great Britain and France
- 1972 Kiwi tour of Australia
- 1978 Kiwi tour of Australia and Papua New Guinea
- 1980 Kiwi tour of Great Britain and France
- 1982 Kiwi tour of Australia and Papua New Guinea
- 1985 Kiwi tour of Great Britain and France
- 1986 Kiwi tour of Australia and Papua New Guinea
- 1989 Kiwi tour of Great Britain and France
- 1990 Kiwi tour of Papua New Guinea
- 1991 Kiwi tour of Australia
- 1993 Kiwi tour of Great Britain and France
- 1994 Kiwi tour of Papua New Guinea
- 1995 Kiwi tour of Australia
- 1998 Kiwi tour of Great Britain
- 2002 Kiwi tour of Great Britain and France
- 2007 All Golds tour of Great Britain and France

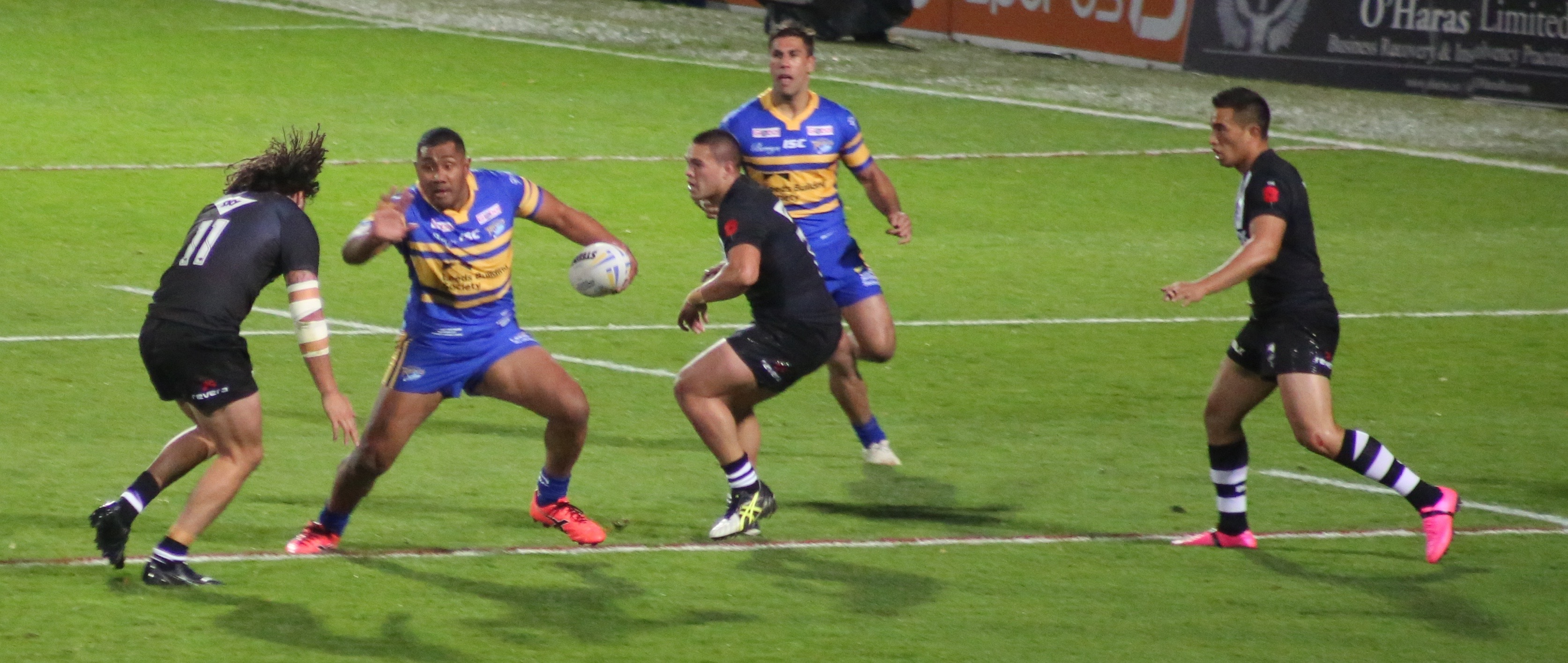
New Zealand vs Leeds Rhinos in Game 1 of their 2015 tour. The only "club vs country" game of the modern touring era.

- 2015 Kiwi tour of England
- 2018 Kiwi tour of England
- 2027 Kiwi tour of England

== Other tours ==
=== Canada ===
- 2019 Wolverines tour of Serbia
- 2026 Wolverines tour of Europe

=== England Knights ===
- 2018 Knights tour of Paupa New Guinea

=== Fiji ===
- 1992 Bati tour of Queensland

=== France ===
- 1934 Les Pionniers tour of Great Britain
- 1951 Les Chanticleers tour of Australia and New Zealand
- 1955 Les Chanticleers tour of Australia New Zealand
- 1960 Les Chanticleers tour of Australia and New Zealand
- 1964 Les Chanticleers tour of Australia and New Zealand
- 1975 Les Chanticleers World Cup tour
- 1977 Les Chanticleers World Cup tour
- 1981 Les Chanticleers tour of Australia and New Zealand
- 1991 Les Chanticleers tour of Australia and New Zealand
- 1994 Les Chanticleers tour of Australia, Fiji, and Papua New Guinea
- 1995 Les Chanticleers tour of New Zealand
- 2001 Les Chanticleers tour of New Zealand and Papua New Guinea
- 2019 Les Chanticleers tour of Australia

=== Italy ===
- 1950 Italy tour of Great Britain
- 1954 Italy tour of Great Britain

=== New South Wales ===
- 1912 New South Wales tour of New Zealand
- 1913 New South Wales tour of New Zealand
- 1922 New South Wales tour of New Zealand

=== Papua New Guinea ===
- 1979 Kumuls tour of Great Britain and France
- 1983 Kumuls tour of Australia and New Zealand
- 1987 Kumuls tour of Great Britain and France
- 1988 Kumuls tour of Australia and New Zealand
- 1991 Kumuls tour of Great Britain and France
- 1992 Kumuls tour of Australia and New Zealand

=== Queensland ===
- 1983 Queensland tour of Papua New Guinea and Great Britain

=== Russia ===
- 1992 CIS tour of South Africa

=== Samoa ===
- 2024 Samoa tour of England

=== Serbia ===
- 2021 Serbia tour of the Balkans

=== South Africa ===
- 1963 South Africa rugby league tour of Australia and New Zealand

=== Tonga ===
- 2023 Tonga tour of England

=== United States ===
- 1953 American All Stars tour of Australia and New Zealand
- 1953–54 American All Stars tour of France

== Women's tours ==
Women's tours have operated very similar to men's tours, however many women's tours have seen a two-test series instead of the three-test series common with men's tours.

=== Australia ===
- 1997 Jillaroo tour of New Zealand
- 2007 Jillaroo tour of New Zealand
- 2009 Jillaroo tour of New Zealand

=== Great Britain ===
- 1996 Lionesses tour of Australia
- 1998 Lionesses tour of New Zealand
- 2002 Lionesses tour of Australia
- 2009 Lionesses tour of France
- 2010 Lionesses tour of New Zealand
- 2011 Lionesses tour of France
- 2015 Lionesses tour of France
- 2017 Lionesses tour of France
- 2019 Lionesses tour of Papua New Guinea

=== New Zealand ===
- 1995 Kiwi Ferns tour of Australia
- 1999 Kiwi Ferns tour of Australia
- 2004 Kiwi Ferns tour of Australia

== Wheelchair tours ==
- 2019 England wheelchair tour of Australia
- 2025 England wheelchair tour of Australia

== See also ==
- History of rugby league
- Geography of rugby league
- List of rugby league competitions
