= 2013 Rugby League European Bowl =

2013 European Bowl
- Number of teams: 3
- Winner: Ukraine (2nd title)
- Matches played: 3

In the 2013 European Bowl competition there were 3 teams taking part with the Czech Republic being joined by Norway and Ukraine. The winners were Ukraine.

== Tournament ==
Team	Played	Won	Drew	Lost	For	Against	Difference	Points
Ukraine	2	2	0	0	110	18	+92	4
Norway	2	1	0	1	40	56	-16	0 (Note: In September 2013, Norway were stripped of the 2 competition points from their game against Czech Republic for fielding ineligible players)
Czech Republic	2	0	0	2	18	94	-76	0

6 July 2013

Ukraine	42–14	Norway
Tries: Kravchenko, Korobov (4), Troyan (2), Felkov (2); Conv: Romanko (3)	(Report)	Tries: Hakonsen, I. Schmidt, Engeland; Conv: Engeland (1)

Dinamo Stadium, Kharkiv

13 July 2013

Norway	26–14	Czech Republic
Tries: Mellor, Davidson, Sundsfjord, Linnestå, Schmidt; Conv: Granly Meldalen (1)	(Report)	Tries: Zemánek, Cintler, Čáslavka; Conv: Buben (1)

Bislett Stadium, Oslo

28 September 2013

Czech Republic	4–68	Ukraine
Goals: Sedina (2)	(Report)	Tries: Troyan (4), Mashkin (2), Shaskov (3), Mazepa, Romanko, Skorbach, Pojidaev; Conv: Skorbach (5), Romanko (3)

Municipal Stadium, Vrchlabí
