= Jarrod Sammut =

Malta dual-code rugby international footballer

Jarrod "Jazz" Sammut
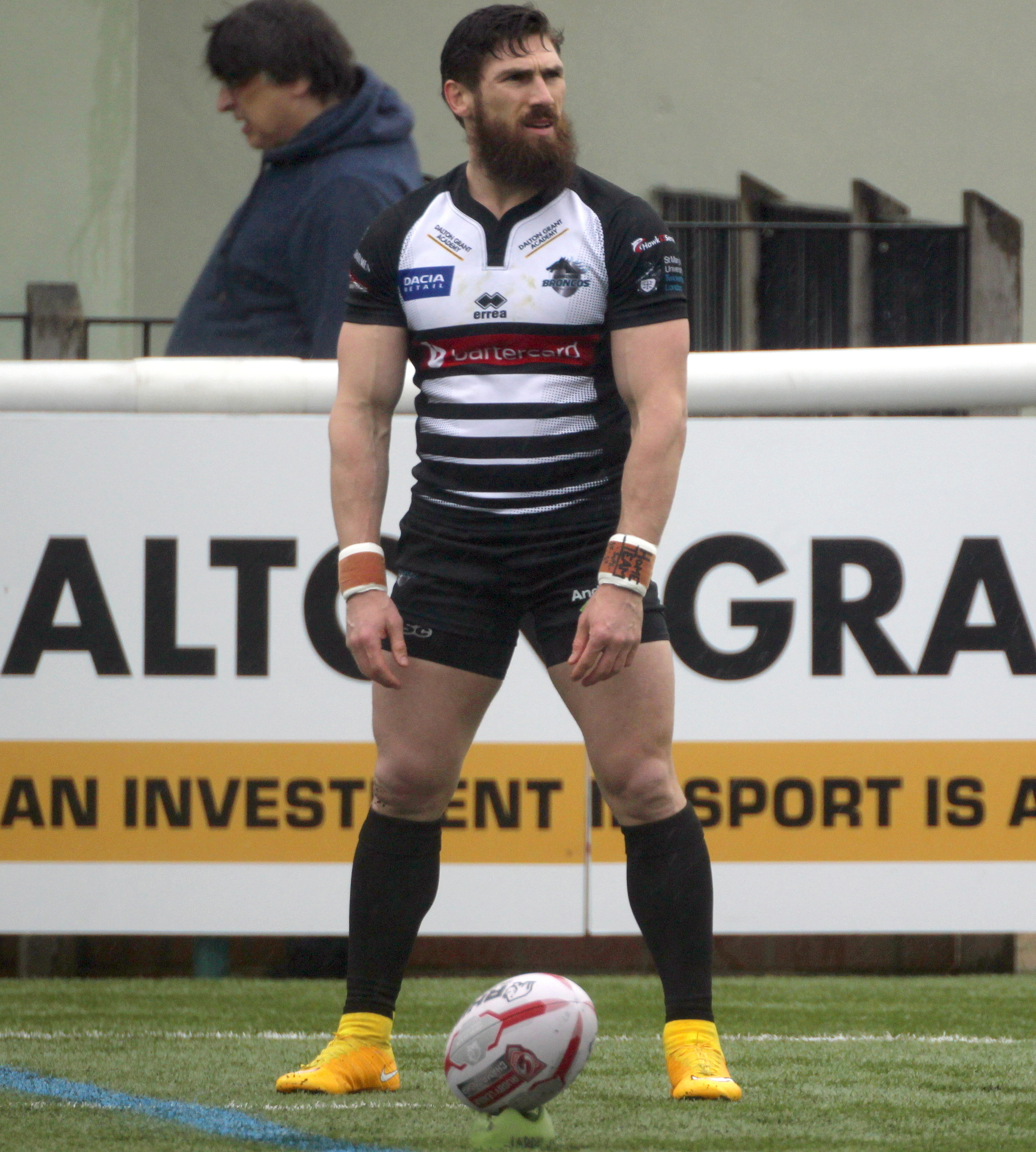

Personal information
- Full name: Jarrod Sammut
- Born: 15 February 1987 (age 39) Blacktown, New South Wales, Australia
- Height: 5 ft 7 in (169 cm)
- Weight: 12 st 13 lb (82 kg)

Playing information

Rugby league
- Position: Scrum-half, Stand-off, Fullback, Hooker
Club
Years	Team	Pld	T	G	FG	P
2007–09	Penrith Panthers	38	9	44	2	126
2010–11	Crusaders RL	35	18	0	0	72
2012–13	Bradford Bulls	40	32	60	1	245
2014–15	Wakefield Trinity Wildcats	21	9	53	0	142
2014(DR)	→ Featherstone Rovers	1	0	10	0	20
2015(loan)	→ London Broncos	5	1	0	0	4
2015(DR)	→ Workington Town	12	9	20	1	77
2016	Workington Town	25	24	57	2	212
2017–18	London Broncos	55	45	191	4	566
2019–20	Wigan Warriors	14	2	0	0	8
2020	Leigh Centurions	1	0	0	0	0
2021	London Broncos	9	6	2	0	28
2022–23	Barrow Raiders	27	20	45	1	171
2024	Workington Town	11	5	0	0	20
2024(loan)	→ Bradford Bulls	8	1	1	0	6
2025	Keighley Cougars	3	0	0	0	0
	Total	305	181	483	11	1697
Representative
Years	Team	Pld	T	G	FG	P
2006–	Malta	17	11	32	1	107

Rugby union
Representative
Years	Team	Pld	T	G	FG	P
2008	Malta	1	0	4	0	11
- Source: As of 28 January 2025

Jarrod Sammut (born 15 February 1987) is a Maltese international rugby league footballer who most recently played as a stand-off or scrum-half for Keighley Cougars in League One.

He previously played for Penrith Panthers in the NRL, and played for Crusaders RL, Bradford Bulls, Wakefield Trinity Wildcats and Wigan Warriors in the Super League. Sammut spent time on loan from the Wildcats at Featherstone Rovers, London and Workington Town in the Championship. He joined Workington on a permanent deal in the Kingstone Press Championship. He has also played for the Broncos and the Leigh Centurions in the second tier. Sammut is a dual-code international for Malta, having represented both the Malta national rugby league team and the Malta national rugby union team.

== Early life ==
Sammut was born in Blacktown, New South Wales, Australia to parents Darren and Kim. He is of Indigenous Australian descent through his mother, and Maltese descent through his paternal grandparents.

He was educated at Patrician Brothers' College Blacktown and played junior rugby league for the Doonside Roos.

== Playing career ==
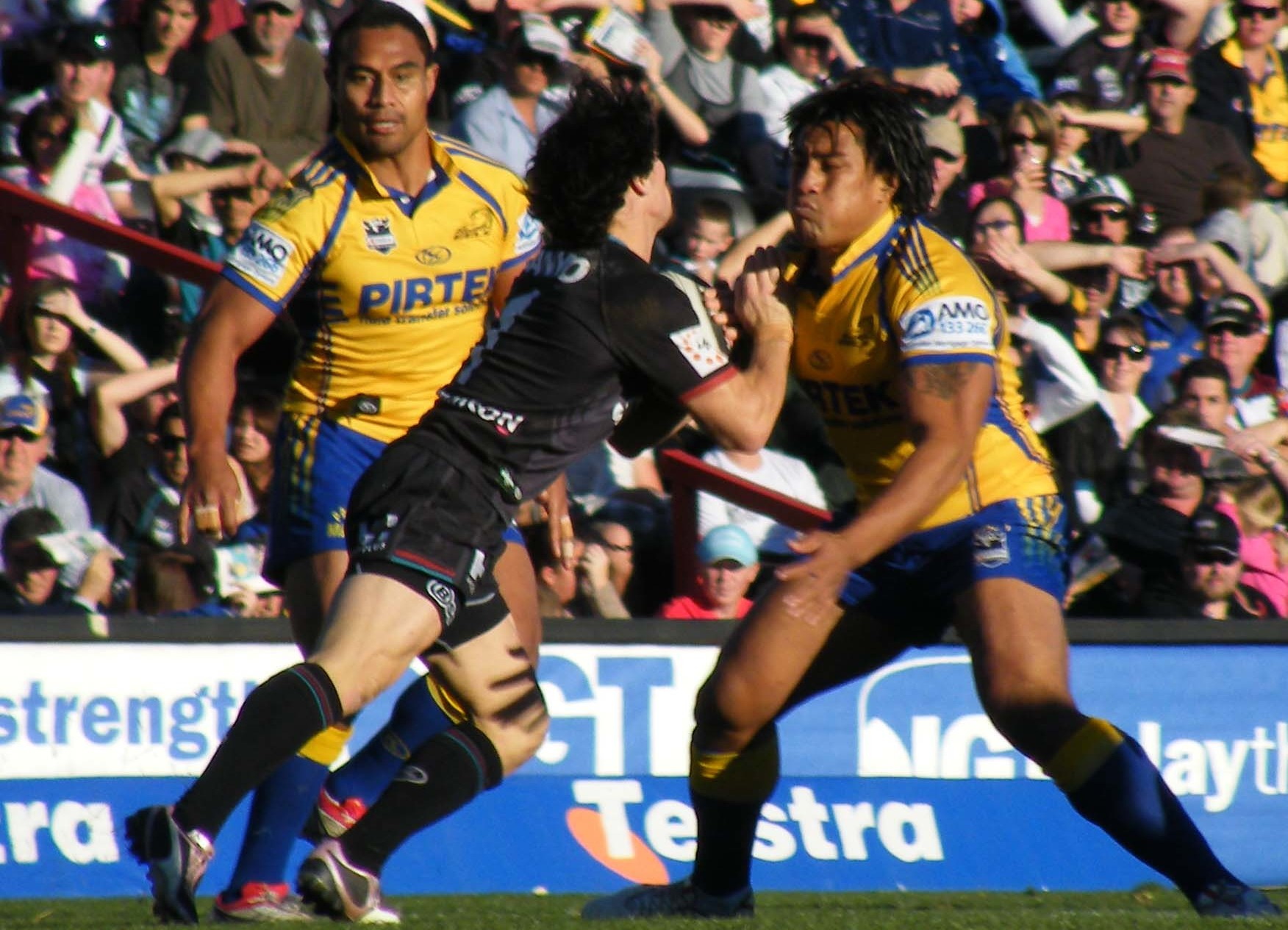
Sammut playing in the NRL for the Penrith Panthers against the Parramatta Eels in 2009

=== Penrith Panthers ===
Sammut was a member of the Penrith Panthers squad that defeated Newcastle Knights in the 2006 Jersey Flegg Cup grand final. He made his NRL début for the Panthers on 4 August 2007 against the South Sydney Rabbitohs. On 30 September 2007, Sammut captained the Panthers' side in their Jersey Flegg Cup Grand Final, scoring 1 try, 3 goals, and 1 field goal in their 19-14 win over the Parramatta Eels.

=== Crusaders RL ===
In April 2010, Sammut was released from the final year of his Panthers' contract to join the Crusaders in the Super League on a two-and-a-half-year contract until the end of 2012.

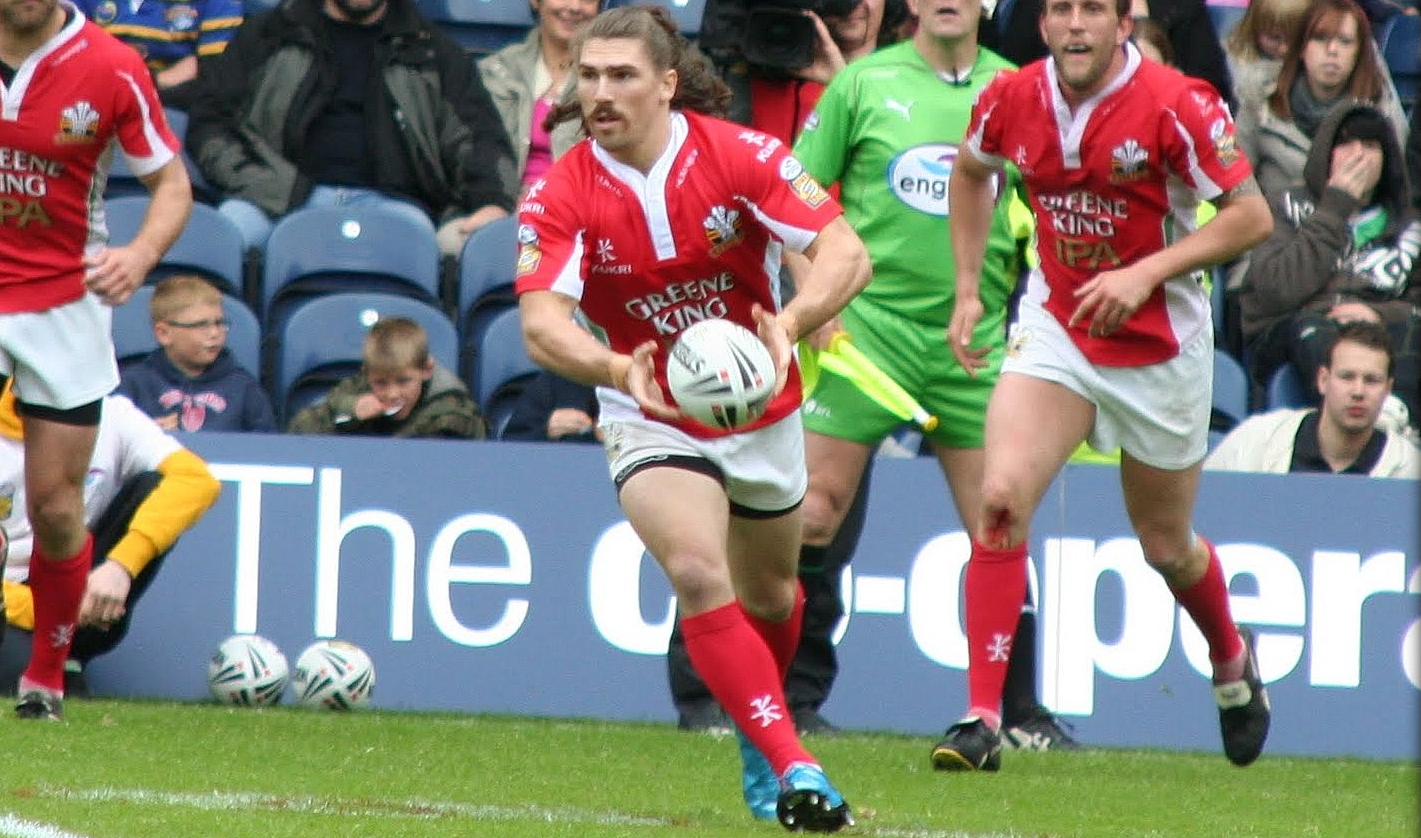
Sammut playing for Crusaders RL in 2010

His arrival in Wales was delayed by volcanic ash and a broken down plane. The delay meant that Sammut made it to Wales only one day before the team headed to Edinburgh for the Magic Weekend. Despite the late arrival and jet lag, Sammut scored a try in his Crusaders debut.

=== Bradford Bulls ===
Sammut joined the Bradford Bulls in 2012 on a one-year contract. During the 2013 pre-season, he signed a new two-tier extension to his contract.

=== Wakefield Trinity Wildcats ===
After playing for the Bradford Bulls in a 2014 pre-season match, Sammut signed a two-year contract with the Wakefield Trinity Wildcats on 14 February 2014, one day before the start of the Super League season.

On 25 June 2014, Sammut joined Featherstone Rovers on a dual-registration. He played in their match against the North Wales Crusaders (the successor of his former club), kicking 10 goals from 10 attempts.

On 26 February 2015, Sammut joined the London Broncos on a dual-registration.

=== Workington Town ===
On 23 December 2015, Sammut signed with Workington Town.

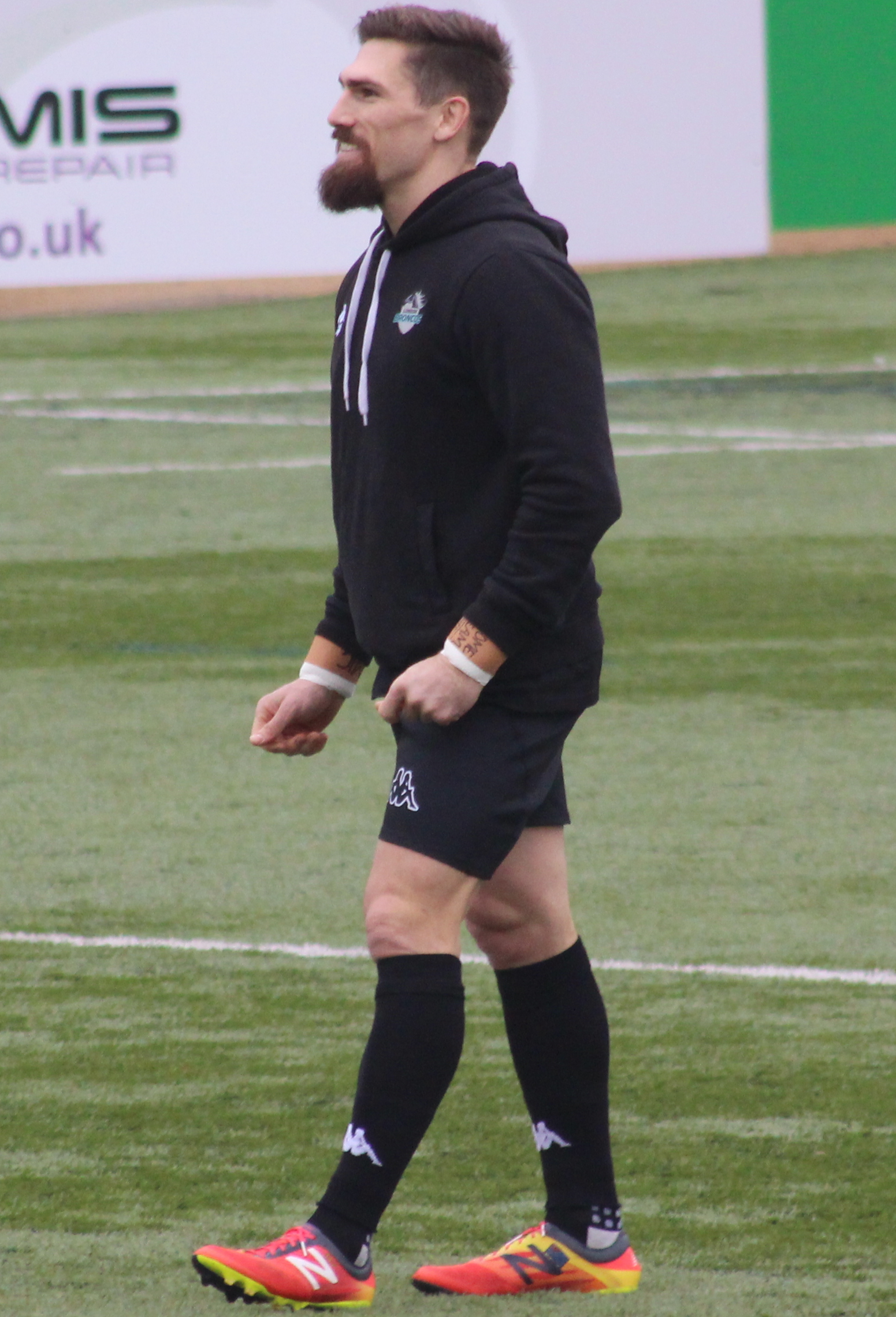
Sammut warming up for the London Broncos

=== London Broncos ===
Sammut signed a two-year deal with the London Broncos on 25 October 2016.

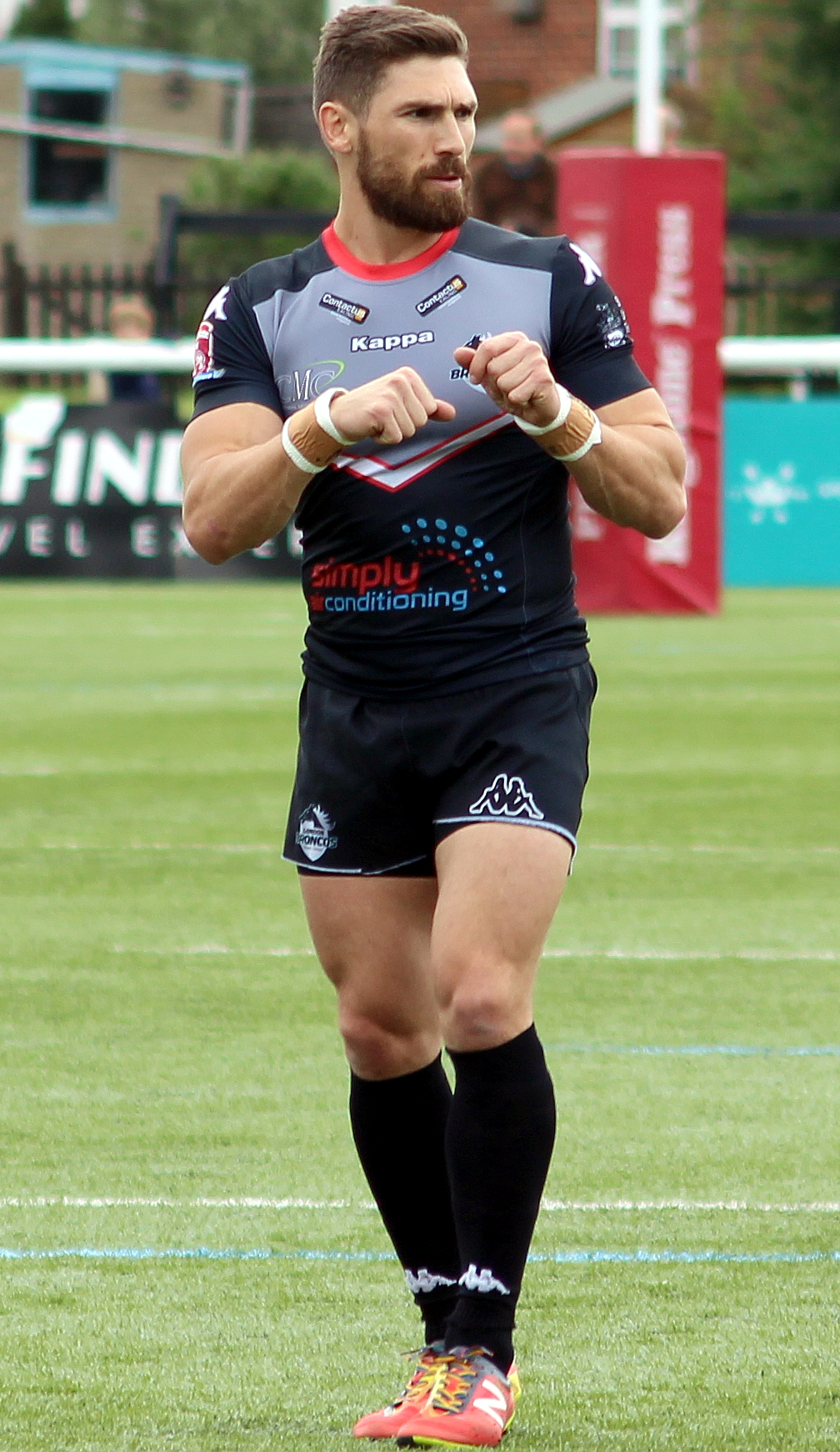
Sammut playing for the London Broncos in 2017

=== Leigh Centurions ===
On 5 December 2019 it was announced that Sammut would join the Leigh Centurions.

=== Barrow Raiders ===
On 3 December 2021, he signed for Barrow Raiders in the RFL Championship.

On 1 December 2023 he left Barrow Raiders and become a free-agent.

=== Workington Town RLFC (rejoin) ===
On 10 January 2024 he signed for Workington Town RLFC in League One.

=== Bradford Bulls (loan) ===
On 30 July 2024, Bradford Bulls announced that Sammut had returned to the club on a loan deal until the end of the 2024 season.

=== Keighley Cougars ===
Released by Workington at the end of the 2024 season, Sammut joined League One Keighley Cougars on a one-year contract on 28 January 2025. After making three appearances for the club, his contract was cancelled by mutual consent on 28 March 2025.

== Representative career ==
=== Rugby League ===
Sammut made his Test début for Malta on 8 October 2006 in their match against Lebanon. His 36-point haul against Norway in the 2011 European Shield equaled the record for most points scored by a player in an international match, according to the RLEF. Sammut was named in Malta's train-on squad for their 28 October 2016 Test match against Thailand. The match was cancelled following the death of Thailand's King Bhumibol Adulyadej.

Test match statistics
Date	Opponents	Tries	Goals	FG	Points	Ref
8 October 2006	Lebanon	0	0	0	0	
25 January 2007	Japan	Unknown				
6 October 2007	Portugal	Unknown				
23 July 2011	Germany	1	0	0	4	
2 September 2011	Norway	4	10/11	0	36	
29 September 2012	Denmark	4	11/13	0	38	

Sammut has also represented Malta in non-Test matches. On 19 October 2007, he scored a try against the Royal Logistic Corps' rugby league team. In October 2009, Sammut represented Malta in the Australian Mediterranean (Aus-Med) Shield at Marconi Stadium in Sydney, a tournament made up completely of Australian residents, such as Blake Austin, John Skandalis and Cameron Ciraldo. Sammut played in both of Malta's games, against Italy and Portugal.

=== Rugby Union ===
On 25 October 2008, Sammut represented the Malta national rugby union team in their 2011 Rugby World Cup qualifying match against Croatia. He kicked 3 penalty goals and 1 conversion for a total of 11 points in Malta's 16-18 loss. Sammut was to also play against Sweden on 1 November 2008, but was pulled from the game after the NRL learned he was playing union, not league.
