= 2009 Rugby League European Bowl =

2009 European Bowl
- Number of teams: 3
- Winner: Ukraine (1st title)
- Matches played: 3

The 2009 European Cup, an international rugby league competition, took place in July and August 2009 with Ukraine, who had forfeited both their matches the previous year, joining Estonia and Latvia; the winners were Ukraine.

Team	Played	Won	Drew	Lost	For	Against	Difference	Points
Ukraine	2	2	0	0	126	6	+120	4
Latvia	2	1	0	1	80	44	+36	2
Estonia	2	0	0	2	4	160	-156	0

24 July 2009

Latvia	6–40	Ukraine
Try: Ashmolis; Conv: Valdavs	(Report)	Tries: Romanko (2), Martyrosyan, Troyan (2), Kardakov, Ljubensky; Conv: Romanko (6)

Upezhtsiems Stadium, Riga

26 July 2009

Estonia	0–86	Ukraine
	(Report)

Upezhtsiems Stadium, Riga

8 August 2009

Estonia	4–74	Latvia
	(Report)

Le Coq Arena, Tallinn
