= Stadio Plebiscito =

Multi-use stadium in Padua, Italy

Coordinates: 45.4339°N 11.8995°E

Plebiscito
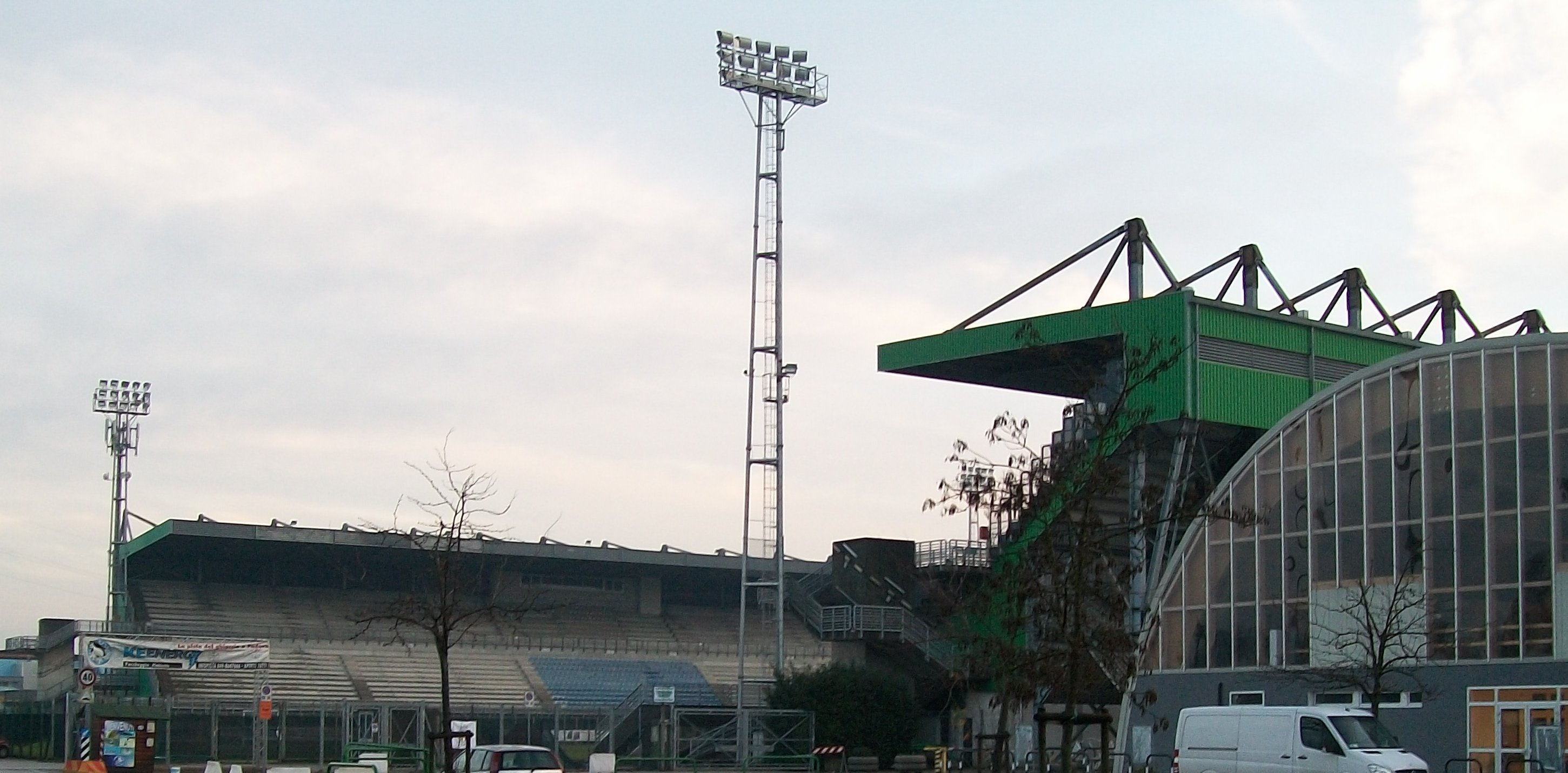
- Interactive map of Plebiscito
- Location: Via G. Geremia 2/2; 35125 Padua, Italy
- Owner: Municipality of Padua
- Capacity: 9,500
- Surface: Grass; 105x67m

Tenants
- Petrarca Padova; San Paolo Padova (2010-2014); Saints Padova

Stadio Plebiscito is a multi-use stadium in Padua, Italy. The stadium holds 9,600 all-covered seats. It has been used as a home venue by the Italy national teams in both rugby union and rugby league.

It is used mostly for rugby union matches as the home of Petrarca Padova; but for 2010/11 season it will be used also for the home matches of the second football team of the city, San Paolo Padova, playing in Serie D.

== Rugby union ==
In October 1996, the venue hosted a test match between Italy and Australia as part of the Wallabies tour of Europe. When Italy hosted the 2011 IRB Junior World Championship, it was one of three venues used for the pool stages of the competition. The venue was used for Women's Six Nations Championship matches in 2015, 2018 and 2019 with Italy winning on all three occasions. In November 2022, the venue hosted the end-of-year international match between the men's teams of Italy and Samoa.

=== Rugby union men's internationals ===
Date	Home team	Result	Opponent	Attendance	Competition	Report
23 October 1996	Italy	18–40	Australia	7,000	Australia in Europe	
5 November 2022	Italy	49–17	Samoa	8.457	Autumn internationals	

=== Rugby union women's internationals ===
Date	Home team	Result	Opponent	Attendance	Competition	Report
21 March 2015	Italy	22–5	Wales		2015 Women's Six Nations	
18 March 2018	Italy	26–12	Scotland		2018 Women's Six Nations	
17 March 2019	Italy	31–12	France		2019 Women's Six Nations	

== Rugby league ==
In July 2002, the stadium hosted the Padova Cup in which the national side played in Italy for the first time since 1960. They lost their opening fixture 12–16 to a Tatarstan representative side and drew 16–16 against Scotland Students who won the series. In 2003, the stadium hosted the touring Scotland A side that won 30–10 over Italy. The stadium hosted Italy's matches in the 2008 European Shield and 2009 European Cup competitions, and the second game of a two match series against Lebanon in 2010. In October 2011, it was the venue for Italy's 92–6 win over Russia in the 2013 World Cup Qualifiers.

=== Rugby league internationals ===
Date	Home team	Result	Opponent	Attendance	Competition	Report
13 June 2008	Italy	58–26	Germany		2008 European Shield	
17 October 2009	Italy	0–104	Scotland	2,179	2009 European Cup	
27 September 2010	Italy	24–16	Lebanon			
15 October 2011	Italy	92–6	Russia		2013 World Cup Qualifying	

== See also ==
- List of rugby league stadiums by capacity
- List of rugby union stadiums by capacity
