= 2008 European Shield =

- Duration: 2 Rounds
- Number of teams: 3
- Winners: Italy
- Runners-up: Germany

In early 2008 it was announced that Italy had replaced Serbia in the European Shield. Serbia were elevated to a higher level with Russia and Lebanon after winning the 2007 shield. Italy were one of the newest European nations to adopt rugby league with the Veneto 9s the only RL tournament in the country at the time.

== Results ==
2008-06-13

Italy	58–26	Germany
	(Report)

Padova, Stadio Plebiscito
Attendance: ???

2008-07-12

Czech Republic	18–38	Italy
	(Report)

Prague
Attendance: ???

2008-08-02

Germany	62–20	Czech Republic
	(Report)

Karlsruhe
Attendance: ???

== Standings ==
Team	Played	Won	Drew	Lost	For	Against	Difference	Points
Italy	2	2	0	0	96	44	+52	4
Germany	2	1	0	1	88	78	+10	2
Czech Republic	2	0	0	2	38	100	-62	0
