= 2025 Rugby League World Cup =

Collection of cancelled rugby league tournaments

- Number of teams: 16 (men); 16 (women); 16 (wheelchair); 16 (youth)
- Host country: France
- Matches played: 93 (planned)

The 2025 Rugby League World Cup (RLWC2025) was a planned collection of world cups in the sport of rugby league which was replaced by the 2026 Rugby League World Cup.

Like 2021, the 2025 World Cup was to have run a men's, women's and wheelchair world cups simultaneously, in addition to a youth World Cup.

Originally due to be staged in the USA and Canada, the offer was withdrawn due to financial concerns, hosting was subsequently awarded to France. In May 2023 the French organisers pulled out of hosting the games. On 3 August 2023 the tournaments were cancelled by the sport's governing body with the announcement that a new reduced-size tournament would take place in the southern hemisphere in 2026.

== Host selection ==
=== Host 1: United States and Canada ===
After the United States lost the 2021 Rugby League World Cup bid to England, International Rugby League (IRL) recommended that the United States and Canada should host the 2025 event after a bid by Moore Sports International. The IRL Congress reviewed that recommendation at a meeting in November 2016. On 20 November, it was announced that the United States and Canada bid had won the rights to host the 2025 World Cup. This would have been the first time the tournament was held outside of Europe and Oceania.

On 4 December 2018, plans for the World Cup to be held in North America were scrapped due to financial concerns and that the location of the 2025 Rugby League World Cup would be determined by a new bidding process in 2019.

=== Host 2: France ===
In March 2021, it was reported that France is the preferred destination for the 2025 Rugby League World Cup. France officially lodged a bid later that year, in July.

In January 2022, France won the bid to host the world cup. The official announcement announcing France as the host nation was made on 11 January 2022 by then French prime minister, Jean Castex, who described hosting the tournament as "a tremendous asset for economic appeal and social cohesion".

International Rugby League president Troy Grant stated:

"The rebirth of international rugby league in France has been a strategic goal of our sport for many decades and I am delighted that it will now become a reality through this award of the 2025 World Cup to France."

On 12 May 2023 reports began circulating that France would withdraw from hosting the tournament.

On 15 May, it was announced that France had withdrawn as hosts, due to financial concerns from the new French government, elected in May 2022. French rugby league journalist Rodolphe Pires cited the lack of regular international matches and France's poor performances in recent years as a contributing factor to the French Government's decision.

==== Controversy surrounding the withdrawal ====
Following the withdrawal of France as hosts, organisers and journalists began to criticise the French government on their decision as it was reported that the French Government were demanding "financial guarantee to cover the risk of losses". Controversy comes from the planned investment of €10,000,000 being dwarfed compared to the money already invested by the French Government into the 2023 Rugby Union World Cup (~€170,000,000) and 2024 Summer Olympics (~€1,500,000,000). Other journalists have also likened the dissociation of rugby league by the French Government to the sport's ban under the Vichy France regime.

==== Reaction to the withdrawal ====
International Rugby League president Troy Grant statement on the withdrawal:

"I respect the French government's decision amid the challenges they are facing but I can't hide my disappointment, that I conveyed clearly to them in person. Despite our focus having been on France, we will now accelerate our consideration of other contingency options."

Grant also expressed that France will continue to be "central to our strategic plans", whilst acknowledging that the 2025 tournament was an ambitious project from the start, but one believed possible after the success of the 2021 Rugby League World Cup.

Rodolphe Pires described the withdrawal as a "betrayal" to French rugby league fans.

Sam Tomkins, then captain of the largest club in France, Catalans Dragons, described the withdrawal as a "huge blow" to French rugby league and continued to say it was something that the French public "were really looking forward to".

=== Subsequent action and cancellation ===
One day after France's withdrawal, New Zealand announced it was considering a bid to host the tournament in 2026, as well as a bid with potential co-hosts Australia which could be staged in the intended 2025. Fiji, Qatar, and South Africa had also expressed interest.

In August 2023 the IRL announced that the 2025 tournaments were cancelled with the next events to take place in 2026 in the southern hemisphere and with the number of nations taking part in the men's tournament reduced from 16 to 10. The number of women's and wheelchair teams participating remained at 8 after a planned expansion to 16.

== Nations ==
At the time of cancellation, 17 nations had qualified for the four tournaments:

- Australia (M, W, WC, Y)
- Brazil (W)
- Canada (W)
- Cook Islands (W)
- England (M, W, WC, Y)
- Fiji (M)
- France (M, W, WC, Y)
- Ireland (WC)
- Lebanon (M)
- New Zealand (M, W, Y)
- Papua New Guinea (M, W)
- Samoa (M)
- Scotland (WC)
- Spain (WC)
- Tonga (M)
- United States (WC)
- Wales (WC)

Note: M=Men's tournament, W=Women's tournament, WC=Wheelchair tournament, Y=Youth tournament

== Qualification ==
The above nations had automatically qualified for the 2025 Rugby League World Cup by virtue of reaching the 2021 quarter finals (men's), participating in 2021 (women's and wheelchair), or by being one of the four core rugby league nations (youth).

=== Men's ===
==== Americas ====
Brazil won the 2022 South American Rugby League Championship. As a result they were to enter a 2023 qualification tournament with Canada, Jamaica, and the United States for the Americas' two places in the tournament.

==== Europe ====
European qualification was intended to be achieved via the 2023 Rugby League European Championships and following repêchage in 2024 for Europe's four remaining places.

==== Africa and Oceania ====
The winner of a 2023 African qualification tournament (details of which were never announced) would play the Cook Islands in 2024 for the final place in the tournament.

=== Women's ===
2025 would have been the first time women's teams would have to qualify for the World Cup. In April 2022, International Rugby League announced that including the automatically qualifying teams, the tournament would consist of three teams from The Americas, six from Asia-Pacific, six Europe, and one from Middle East-Africa. In July 2022, a qualifying structure was announced for each region. On 8 March 2023, further details for the European qualification process were announced with eight teams divided into two groups and matches scheduled to take place between September 2023 and May 2024.

=== Wheelchair and Youth ===
The wheelchair tournament would continue to be invitees only, with the inaugural youth tournament being the same.

== Venues ==
For the tournament, 38 cities bid to host matches across the men's, women's, wheelchair, and youth competitions. These were:

Albi, Arras, Autun, Beauvais, Blagnac, Begles, Besancon, Biganos, Bordeaux, Boulazac, Carcassonne, Chambery, Chatillon, Issoire, Le Creusot, Le Mans, Libourne, Limoges, Limoux, Lourdes, Marmande-Tonneins, Martigues, Massy, Montauban, Montlucon; Narbonne, Nice, Paris, Perigueux, Perpignan, Pia, Roanne, Salon-de-Provence, Toulouse, Trelissac, Vannes, Vichy, Villefrance-de-Rouergue, Villeneuve-sur-Lot.

It was intended that Paris, Toulouse and Marseille would host the final and semi-finals of the men's tournament.
