= 2010 European Shield =

- Duration: 2 Rounds
- Number of teams: 6
- Winners: Serbia (West); Russia (East)
- Runners-up: Germany (West); Ukraine (East)

For the 2010 fixture, the field was doubled from three teams to six. In the Eastern group, Russia topped the table by defeating Latvia and Ukraine. Serbia took the Western group title by defeating both Germany and Czech Republic.

== Eastern Group ==
=== Results ===
2010-06-27

Russia	62-14	Ukraine
Tries: Gapanov (3), Fedchuk, Lysokon, Bratko, Ososkov, Churpin, Vlasyuk; Goals: Lysokon (5), Ososkov (2), Bratko	(Report)	Tries: Miroshnichenko, Lyubensky; Goals: Skorbach (3)

Vereya Stadium, Vereya, Moscow Oblast

2010-07-31

Latvia	4-54	Russia
Try: Jakušs	(Report)	Tries: Nechaev, Bulanov (3), Gaponov, Galimov (2), Ososkov, Loschilin, Nikolaev; Goals: Lisokony (6), Ososkov

Upesciems Stadium, Upesciems

2010-09-18

Ukraine	112-0	Latvia
Tries: Shevtsov (5), Lyubenskey (5), Skorbach (3), Kardakov (2), Bashevsky (2), Lobanj, Smolin, Kravchenk, Markelov; Goals: Skorbach (12), Lyubenskey (2)	(Report)

Arsenal Stadium, Kyiv

=== Standings ===
Team	Played	Won	Drew	Lost	For	Against	Diff	Points
Russia	2	2	0	0	106	18	88	4
Ukraine	2	1	0	1	126	52	74	2
Latvia	2	0	0	2	4	166	-162	0

== Western Group ==
=== Results ===
2010-06-26

Czech Republic	4-56	Serbia
Try: Mana	(Report)	Tries: Vukanović (4), Dajč, Lukenić, Pešić, Nikolić, Delić, Šušnjara; Goals: Vukanović (8)

RK Petrovice, Prague
Attendance: 100

2010-07-03

Serbia	40-14	Germany
Tries: Vukanović (3), Pešić (2), Nikolić, Grbić; Goals: Vukanović (6)	(Report)	Tries: N. Keinhorst, J. Keinhorst, Schoengen; Goal: K. Keinhorst

FK Radnički Novi Beograd, Belgrade
Attendance: 300

2010-07-17

Germany	96-0	Czech Republic
Tries: Stocks (4), Koch (3), N. Keinhorst (2), K.Keinhorst (2), Seibold (2), Rehm, Huber, J. Keinhorst, Cooper, Szehofner; Goals: K.Keinhorst (11), Cooper	(Report)

TuS Hochspeyer, Hochspeyer

=== Standings ===
Team	Played	Won	Drew	Lost	For	Against	Diff	Points
Serbia	2	2	0	0	96	18	78	4
Germany	2	1	0	1	110	40	70	2
Czech Republic	2	0	0	2	4	152	-148	0
