= 2020 Rugby League European Championships =

Cancelled rugby league tournament

The 2020 Rugby League European Championships were a series of international rugby league tournament that were scheduled to place in October and November 2020. The tournaments were severely affected by the COVID-19 pandemic.

== Background ==
A restructured European Championship system was announced in January 2020, with Euro A to be contested by six teams across two pools. Euro B and C remained a three-team competition, while a Euro D was introduced for the first time consisting of four teams.

=== COVID-19 cancellations and aftermath ===
In July 2020, the top tier tournament was cancelled in due to the COVID-19 pandemic, with postponement to 2021 was not possible due to participating teams competing in the 2021 Men's Rugby League World Cup (which itself was eventually postponed to 2022 due to the pandemic). The remainder of the competition was postponed to 2021, however Euro C required a second postponement and was subsequently cancelled.

The next edition of the tournament was intended to be in 2023, however that ended up postponed due to France withdrawing as hosts of the 2025 Rugby League World Cup.

In March 2025, the ERL announced the return of the tournament starting in October, thus officially canceling the 2023 edition.

== Euro A ==
2023 European Championship
- Number of teams: 6
- Matches played: 7

=== Planned fixtures ===
==== Draw ====
Six teams were to have competed in the 2020 edition, with Italy and Spain joining the four teams that participated in 2018. The teams were split into two pools of three, where the winners would have contested a final and the bottom teams would have been relegated to the 2022 European Championship B.

The draw was conducted on 31 January 2020 at the Red Star Sport Society Media Centre in Belgrade by Stevan Stevanovic and Jelena Stojiljkovic, the captains of Serbia's mens and women's rugby league teams respectively.

==== Group A1 ====
Pos	Team	Pld	W	D	L	PF	PA	PD	Pts	Qualification
1	France	0	0	0	0	0	0	0	0	Advance to Final
2	Italy	0	0	0	0	0	0	0	0	
3	Scotland	0	0	0	0	0	0	0	0	Relegation to Euro B

Updated to match(es) played on 20 October 2018. Source: [=]

17/18 October 2020

France	v	Italy
	Report

24/25 October 2020

Italy	v	Scotland
	Report

31 October/1 November 2020

Scotland	v	France
	Report

==== Group A2 ====
Pos	Team	Pld	W	D	L	PF	PA	PD	Pts	Qualification
1	Ireland	0	0	0	0	0	0	0	0	Advance to Final
2	Spain	0	0	0	0	0	0	0	0	
3	Wales	0	0	0	0	0	0	0	0	Relegation to Euro B

Updated to match(es) played on 31 January 2020. Source:

17/18 October 2020

Ireland	v	Spain
	Report

24/25 October 2020

Wales	v	Ireland
	Report

31 October/1 November 2020

Spain	v	Wales
	Report

==== Final ====
7/8 November 2020

Winner of A1	v	Winner of A2

== Euro B ==
2021 European Championship B
- Number of teams: 3
- Host country: Serbia
- Winner: Serbia (4th title)
- Matches played: 3
- Points scored: 262 (87.33 per match)
- Tries scored: 50 (16.67 per match)
- Top scorer: (Ukraine) Oleksandr Skorbach (46)
- Top try scorers: (Ukraine) Anatolii Hrankovskyi (4) (Ukraine) Oleksandr Skorbach (4) (Serbia) Rajko Trifunović (4)

The 2021 European Championship B was an international rugby league tournament that took place in October 2021, originally scheduled to take place in October 2020. The tournament was postponed in July 2020 due to the COVID-19 pandemic. A revised schedule was announced in April 2021, and the tournament details were confirmed in August 2021.

=== Background ===
Russia, Serbia, and Ukraine played each other once in a round robin format. Ukraine entered the tournament after the 2020 European Championship C was cancelled. Greece withdrew as their domestic competition was yet to restart. The winner of the tournament will be promoted to 2022 European Championship.

John Risman, who is a lifetime honorary president of Serbian Rugby League presented the trophy and medals to the winner of the tournament. The tournament was won by Serbia, with Ukraine finishing runner-up and Russia third.

=== Participants ===
Team	Captain	Coach	Previous Apps	Previous best result	World Ranking (Note: IRL World Rankings are as of July 2021.)
Russia	Andrey Zdobnikov	(Russia) Roman Ovchinnikov	5	Champions (2010 East, 2012–13, 2018)	37
Serbia	Stevan Stevanović	(England) Darren Fisher	5	Champions (2007, 2010 West, 2014–15)	15
Ukraine	Oleksandr Skorbach	(Ukraine) Gennady Veprik	3	Runners-up (2010 East)	39

=== Squads ===
On 29 September 2021, each competing nation announced their squads for the tournament.

==== Serbia ====
Stefan Simovic (RLC Dorcol Tigers), Aleksandar Pavlovic, Djordje Krnjeta, Dragan Jankovic, Dzavid Jasari, Enis Bibic, Nemanja Manojlovic, Stevan Stevanovic, Vladimir Milutinovic (RLC Partizan 1953), Lazar Zivkovic, Mihajlo Jovic, Stefan Arsic (RLC Radnicki Nis), Aleksandar Djordjevic, Marko Jankovic, Milos Calic, Milos Zogovic, Miodrag Tomic, Nikola Djuric Rajko Trifunovic, Stefan Nedeljkovic, Vojislav Dedic (RLC Red Star)

==== Russia ====
Ilia Danilov (RC Dinamo), Evgenii Chevankov, Artem Egorov, Roman Ovchinnikov, Sergei Sazonov, Pavel Smirnov, Dmitrii Strukov, Ivan Suracov, Ivan Troitskii, Artem Tiutrin, Ivan Vabishchevich, Andrei Zdobnikov (RLC Locomotive), Egor Petukhov (RC Moscow Dragons), Vadim Buriak, Igor Chuprin, Aram Gazarian, Anton Matiushkin, Zakir Prizniakov (RLC Olimp), Andrey Perin (RC Spartak), Kirill Bozhko, Maxim Martynov (RC Zelenograd)

==== Ukraine ====
Liubomyr Beznoshchuk, Vitalii Boichuk (Carpathian Trinity), Anatolii Hrankovskyi, Taras Kolisnyk, Vitalii Puchkov, Dmytro Semerenko, Oleksandr Shcherbyna, Oleksandr Skorbach, Oleksandr Syvokoz, Mykhailo Troian, Evhenii Trusov, Bohdan Vepryk, Ihor Yurkin (Kharkiv Legion XIII), Valentyn Korchak, Orest Adamyk, Valentyn Koval, Danylo Kozak, Igor Vashchuk (Lviv Tigers), Volodymyr Radchyk (Rivne Giants)

=== Table ===
Pos	Team	Pld	W	D	L	PF	PA	PD	Pts	Qualification
1	Serbia	2	2	0	0	120	28	+92	4	Promotion to Euro A
2	Ukraine	2	1	0	1	114	72	+42	2	
3	Russia	2	0	0	2	28	162	−134	0	

Source: ERL

=== Fixtures ===
3 October 2021
14:00 CEST (UTC+2:00)

Serbia	66–10	Russia
Tries: Djordjević (3), Arsić (2), Vl. Dedić (2), Pavlović (2), Bibić, Djurić, D. Janković, Trifunović; Goals: Jašari (7/13)	Report (IRL); Report (ERL); Report (SRL)	Tries: Egorov, Sazonov; Goals: Vabishchevich (1/2)

City Stadium, Paraćin
Attendance: ≈500
Referee: Stephane Vincent (France)

6 October 2021
13:00 CEST (UTC+2:00)

Russia	18–96	Ukraine
Tries: Chuprin, Troitskii, Vabishchevich; Goals: Vabishchevich (3/3)	Report (IRL); Report (ERL)	Tries: Skorbach (4), Adamyk (2), Hrankovskyi (2), Kolesnik (2), Kozak (2), Trusov (2), Beznoshchuk, Puchkov, Shcherbyna, Troyan; Goals: Skorbach (12/17), Beznoshchuk (0/1)

FK Heroj Polet, Belgrade
Referee: James Jones (Wales)

9 October 2021
14:00 CEST (UTC+2:00)

Ukraine	18–54	Serbia
Tries: Hrankovskyi (2), Shcherbyna; Goals: Skorbach (3/3)	Report (IRL); Report (ERL)	Tries: Trifunović (3), Milutinović (3), Arsić, Vl. Dedić, Stevanović, Zogović; Goals: Jašari (7/10), Vo. Dedić (0/1)

FK Heroj Polet, Belgrade
Attendance: ≈150
Referee: Andrew Pilkington (Spain)

== Euro C ==
2020 European Championship C
- Number of teams: 3

The 2020 European Championship C was a planned international rugby league tournament that would have taken place in October and November 2020.

=== Background ===
In April 2021, after initially being postponed due to the COVID-19 pandemic, the 2020 tournament, which was originally postponed until 2021, was cancelled due to COVID-19 restrictions in Germany and Norway prevented the competition taking-place. Three teams were to compete in the tournament, down from the six that participated in the 2018–19 edition. The three teams are Germany, Norway, and Ukraine.

The tournament was intended to be postponed to 2022, but was never played.

=== Participants ===
Team	Captain	Coach	Previous Apps	Previous best result	World Ranking
Germany	TBA	TBA	1	Third place (2018–19)	TBA
Norway	TBA	TBA	3	Runners-up (2010, 2013, 2018–19)	TBA
Ukraine	TBA	TBA	4	Champions (2009, 2013, 2016)	TBA

=== Original fixtures ===
17–18 October 2020

Norway	v	Ukraine
	Report

24–25 October 2020

Germany	v	Norway
	Report

31 October–1 November 2020

Ukraine	v	Germany
	Report

== Euro D ==
2021 European Championship D
- Number of teams: 4
- Host country: Turkey
- Winner: Netherlands (1st title)
- Matches played: 4
- Points scored: 208 (52 per match)
- Tries scored: 34 (8.5 per match)
- Top scorer: (Netherlands) Auke Idzerda (28 points)
- Top try scorer: (Netherlands) Joran Schoenmaker (5)

The 2021 European Championship D was an international rugby league tournament. Originally scheduled to take place in October and November 2020 the championship was postponed until 2021 due to the COVID-19 pandemic following a meeting of the European Rugby League (ERL) in July 2020. Four teams competed in the tournament; Czechia, Malta, Netherlands and Turkey.

The tournament was won by the Netherlands who beat Czechia 36–10 in the final.

=== Background ===
After initially being rescheduled following the COVID-19 pandemic, the tournament was planned to be played to be played in May and June 2021 with the teams being drawn into two groups of two. The groups would play two games, one home and one away; with the aggregate winners of the two groups meeting in a final. In April 2021 the Rugby League European Federation announced that the tournament will be played at a single venue and that the format of the tournament will not be as originally announced.

The revised draw, venue and format were announced on 1 September 2021. The games were all staged in Bodrum, Turkey on 14 and 17 October and was a single-leg knock-out tournament. To give each team two matches, the losers of the first round games met in a third-place game.

=== Participants ===
Team	Captain	Coach	Previous Apps	Previous best result	World Ranking (Note: IRL World Rankings are as of July 2021.)
Czech Republic	Tomáš Řičica	(Czech Republic) David Lahr	0	Debut	22
Malta	Shan Francois Hussain	(Malta) Roderick Attard	0	Debut	16
Netherlands	Ben Dommershuijsen	(England) Kane Krlic	0	Debut	25
Turkey	Doruk Çeliktutan	(France) Julien Treu	0	Debut	24

=== Squads ===
On 13 October 2021, each competing nation announced 19-man squads for the tournament.

==== Czech Republic ====
Antonín Berk, Daniel Veselý, Filip-Daniel Kittl, (Krupka Dragons), David Bělohlávek, Jan Říha, Erik Schulz (Slávia Hradec Králové), Jakub Hudrlík, Jan Hovard, Josef Chuchlík, Martin Kubát, Matěj Greenwood, Taras Turkevyč, Tomáš Horák (Mad Squirrels Vrchlabí), Jiří Pecina, Ondřej Preininger, Tomáš Řičica (Chrudim Rabbitohs), Jan Pecháček (Vlci Trutnov), Roman Richtr (Barbarians Letohrad), Tomáš Kasík (Black Angels Hodonín)

==== Malta ====
Alfie Jewitt (Ackworth Jaguars), Justin Barlogio (DC Slayers), Dean Zammit (Hunslet), Christian Briffa, Mark Camilleri, Shaun Chircop, Jeremy Dela, Aidan Demicoli, Shan Francois Hussain (IKHAL), Cameron Brown, Russell Bugeja, Robin Cutajar, Justin Farrugia, James Grech, Jean Scholey, Jean Pierre Zarb, Luke Musu (ISWED), Zarrin Galea (Redcliffe Dolphins), Karl Cassar (Shaw Cross Sharks)

==== Netherlands ====
Adam Braksator, Bonne Wilce, Frank Longhurst, Lucas Gout, Maurits Thomson, Paul Dirkzwager, Romeo Goldman, Thomas Farrell (Den Haag Knights), Arie-Tjerk Razoux Schultz, Daniel de Ruiter, (Haderwijk Dolphins), Auke Idzerda, Ben Dommershuijsen, Edson Neves, Isaac Ngirubiu, Shadan Lavia (Rotterdam Pitbulls), Joran Schoenmaker, Laury Renac, Mauricio Gomez Pazos, Paul Kuijpers (Zwolle Wolves)

==== Turkey ====
Alperen Kademli, Can Günersu, Erdem Çağdaş, Kemal Ege Gürkan (Ankara Frigler), Mert Tayyar Berktav (Bilgi Badgers), Miraç Ertürk, Ahmet Tarik Tekin, Batuhan Balçin, Doruk Çeliktutan, Oğuzhan Demir, Ozan Işik, Rama Kabak, Taner Burak, Yusuf Can Tunç (Kadiköy Bulls), Selçuk Cömert (Kandira Ragbi), Errol Carter (London Skolars), Behzad Bayram (Rg Heidelberg), Oğuzhan Tirendez, Ömer Faruk Pir (Trakya Ragbi)

=== Bracket ===
Semi-finals
Malta	16
Czech Republic	40
Netherlands	40
Turkey	18

Final
Czech Republic	10
Netherlands	36
Third place
Malta	12
Turkey	36

=== Fixtures ===
==== Semi-finals ====
First semi-final

14 October 2021
13:00 CET (UTC+1:00)

Malta	16–40	Czech Republic
Tries: Scholey, Barlogio, Galea; Goals: Galea (2/3)	Report (IRL); Report (ERL)	Tries: Bělohlávek, Preininger, Řičica (2), Hudrlík (2), Horák; Goals: Hudrlík (6/7)

Huseyin Akar Tesisler Stadium, Bodrum
Attendance: 500
Referee: Aris Dardamanis (Greece)

Second semi-final

14 October 2021
15:30 CET (UTC+1:00)

Netherlands	40–18	Turkey
Tries: Shoenmake (2), Ngirubiu, Farrell (2), Renac; Goals: Idzera (8/8)	Report (IRL); Report (ERL)	Tries: Demir, Ertürk, Çeliktutan; Goals: Bayram (3/3)

Huseyin Akar Tesisler Stadium, Bodrum
Attendance: 500
Referee: Eamonn Whelan (Ireland)

==== Play-offs ====
Third-place play-off

17 October 2021
13:00 CET (UTC+1:00)

Malta	12–36	Turkey
Tries: Zammit, Cutajar; Goals: Galea (2/2)	Report (IRL); Report (ERL)	Tries: Demir, Işik, Çeliktutan, Bayram, Balçin, Tayyar Berktav, Tirendez; Goals: Bayram (4/7)

Huseyin Akar Tesisler Stadium, Bodrum
Referee: Jarda Bzoch (Czechia)

Championship final (Note: Netherlands promoted to the 2023 European Championship B as well as progressing to the qualifying tournament for the 2025 Rugby League World Cup.)

17 October 2021
15:30 CET (UTC+1:00)

Czech Republic	10–36	Netherlands
Tries: Veselý, Kasík; Goals: Veselý (1/2)	Report (IRL); Report (ERL)	Tries: Schoenmaker (3), Lavia, Razoux Schultz, De Ruiter; Goals: Idzera (6/9)

Huseyin Akar Tesisler Stadium, Bodrum
Referee: Eamonn Whelan (Ireland)
