= 2009 European Shield =

- Duration: 2 Rounds
- Number of teams: 3
- Winners: Italy
- Runners-up: Czech Republic

The 2009 Shield featured the same teams as participated in 2008. In the 2009 fixture, Italy became the first nation to win back-to-back European Shields. As a result they were drafted into the 2009 European Cup, following Russia's withdrawal from that competition. The Czech Republic also reached a milestone, recording their first win in the competition, beating Germany 30 - 4.

== Results ==
2009-07-04

Czech Republic	30–4	Germany
Tries: Zahara, Hladki, Holovský, Navrátil, Stříbro, Priputen; Conv: Kučera (2), Priputen (1)	(Report)	Try: J.Keinhorst

Olomouc

2009-07-11

Italy	38–8	Czech Republic
Tries: Ricci (2), Dubas-Fisher, Lerna, Armani, Facco, Ferrazzano (2); Conv: Veronese (3)	(Report)	Tries: Holovský, Ernst

Jesolo

2008-07-18

Germany	30–42	Italy
Tries: J.Keinhorst (3), K. Keinhorst, N.Keinhorst, Trosch; Conv: J.Keinhorst (3)	(Report)	Tries: Armani (3), Franchi (2), Pasqualini, Veronese; Conv: Veronese(7)

Hürth
Attendance: 250

== Standings ==
Team	Played	Won	Drew	Lost	For	Against	Difference	Points
Italy	2	2	0	0	80	38	42	4
Czech Republic	2	1	0	1	38	42	-4	2
Germany	2	0	0	2	34	72	-38	0
