= Netherlands national rugby league team =

Netherlands

Team information
- Governing body: Netherlandse Rugby League Bond
- Region: Europe
- Head coach: (New Zealand) Dave Hunter
- Captain: (Netherlands) Paul Kuijpers
- IRL ranking: 9th

Uniforms
First colours

Team results
- First international
- Scotland A 22–18 Netherlands (Sassenheim, Netherlands; 2003)
- Biggest win
- Serbia 6–52 Netherlands (Niš, Serbia; 2024)
- Biggest defeat
- Netherlands 16–70 Germany (Delft, Netherlands; 2014)
- World Cup
- Appearances: 0

The Netherlands national rugby league team is the national rugby league team of The Netherlands. It was formed in January 2003. The national team played its first international match in 2003 against Scotland A, where they lost 22–18.

== History ==
Rugby league foundation year was in 2003 where it has regularly being played since 2003 under the NNRLB and has seen small domestic growth along the way. The first rugby league club match was played between Te Werve Bustards (Den Haag) and the touring side Essex Eels. After rugby league ceased in 2008 a new board the Nederlandse Rugby League Bond (NRLB) was entrusted to administer and grow the game in the Netherlands in 2009.

The Dutch participated in 1989 Student Rugby League World Cup in England, against Australia, England, France, New Zealand, Wales, Ireland and Scotland. The first rugby league match in Netherlands was a preparation match for the tournament against the French Army side at the Royal Military Academy in Breda. While in the late 1980s they faced Toulouse to earn a 20 all draw. Having played their first international against Scotland A in Sassenheim only narrowly losing 18 to 22, introducing the Rotterdam Cup in 2004 with a 24–14 loss to Scotland Students and debut 24 to 14 win against Serbia.

2005 saw the Netherlands build on the previous season with the national team playing four internationals. The Netherlands were defeated by Georgia 34 – 14 in April. They then went on to win their other three internationals against Serbia, Scotland and Germany

Serbia made the task of getting past the first round of European qualifiers all the more harder. The Netherlands suffered heavy defeats to Russia 40 – 14 and Georgia 57 – 16. As a consolation the Netherlands managed to defeat the other European newcomers Serbia 38 – 26. Netherlands finished 3rd in the Pool and failed to qualify for the 2008 Rugby League World Cup. The Netherlands capped off 2006 with a win against the Czech Republic 34 – 28.

Rotterdam hosted the Nederlandse International Rugby League Nines Festival for visiting European teams between 2004 and 2007.

At present the NRLB are a nonprofit sports association for rugby league with their main goal to get the game exposure and attract more people to the sport. The NRLB have a short summer season (4 rounds + Finals) with the Netherlands 3V Sports Grand Prix 9's competition for clubs Capelle Spartans, Delft Rugby League, Nootdorp Musketiers and Te Werve Bustards, while they host teams for 13-aside matches including the annual clash with Oxford University Old Boys (in the Kermis Challenge) and varying teams from the UK. Netherlands as national and developmental squads have participated in away tours in tournaments such as the Heidelberg 9's in Germany and UK based events.

In recent seasons the Dutch have also participated in a Cross Border Challenge with select German clubs, National Selection matches (Select GPN vs Residents) and promotional games (combined squad vs Capelle Spartans). At youth level this year, the Dutch staged a BARLA U17 tour against a Netherlands Tasman U17 select in July at Nootdorp and Delft.

Like most developing rugby league nations there are restrictions that the Dutch board face within early stages of development like funding, sponsorship, support and promotion.

The Dutch ten-year plan is to have a fully self-supportive domestic competition running for at least 6 months of the year and to have multiple self-standing Rugby League clubs all over the country. The national squad back on the international stage competing with the best. The Nederlandse Rugby League Bond gained Observer membership status from the Rugby League European Federation in February 2012.

In May 2013, Netherlands made 28th on the RLIF World Rankings after their match against Germany in a losing effort.

== Matches ==
The Netherlands have played their first match in 2003 against Scotland A, losing 22 to 18. They then competed in the 2004 Rotterdam Cup, a tournament that saw Scotland Students, Scotland Students "A", Netherlands, Netherlands "A", Serbia and Serbia "A" playing six full games over five days The Dutch lost both "A" team games and also the senior game to the Scottish Students but opened their winning account by beating the senior side from Serbia.

The Netherlands failed to progress past the preliminary stages of qualifying for the 2008 Rugby League World Cup, after being defeated by Georgia and Russia in 2006. They did however manage a victory against Serbia.

Following these matches, the national team went on hiatus following a dispute between the Netherlands Federation and the RLEF. In 2009, a new board " Nederlandse Rugby League Bond (NRLB) " was appointed to run the Dutch game and re-establish relations with the RLEF. The Netherlands were re-admitted to the RLEF in 2010, and resumed international competition in 2013 with a friendly match against Germany.

== Jerseys ==
Primary

Primary; 2004–2009	Primary; 2009–present

Alternative

Alternative; 2004–2009	Alternative; 2009–present

== Coaching roster ==
=== Current staff ===
Coaches Name	Role	Date Appointed	P	W	L	D	Win%
(New Zealand) David Hunter	Head coach	March 2022	12	10	2	0	83.3
(Netherlands) Hannes Bavius	Assistant coach	June 2022					
(New Zealand) Paul Dirkzwager	Assistant coach	June 2023					
(Netherlands) Ben Dommershuijsen	Assistant coach	June 2023					
(Netherlands) Stephanie van Diepen	Physio	June 2017					
(United Kingdom) Matthew Rigby	Team Manager	August 2019					

=== Former staff ===
Coaches Name	Role	Date Appointed	Date Departed	P	W	L	D	Win%
(New Zealand) Joe Collins	Assistant coach	June 2016	August 2017	2	0	2	0	0.00
(England) Matthew Rigby	Assistant coach	June 2016	August 2019	7	5	2	0	71.43
(Netherlands) Timo Meinders	Team Manager	May 2017	August 2018					

== Current squad ==
Netherlands are able to call on eligible NRL players such as Ryan Papenhuyzen, Jaylan De Groot, Jett Liu, Haizyn Mellars, Ben Te Kura and Aublix Tawha

Squad selected for the Euro B Round 1 against Malta on 10 October 2025.

Pos.	Player	Date of birth (age)	Caps	Pts	Club
					Amsterdam Cobras
					Den Haag Knights
					Zwolle Wolves
					Den Haag Knights
					Amsterdam Cobras
					Brabant Bears
					Zwolle Wolves
	Dimitri Haringa				Zwolle Wolves
	Mavi Gevers				Brabant Bears
	Lachlan van der Vliet				Mareeba Gladiators
	Kevin Ebing				Brabant Bears
	Hidde van den Berg				Amsterdam Cobras
	Damon Koolstra				Souths Sharks Mackay
	Tom Turnock				Rotterdam Pitbulls
	Paul Kuijpers				Zwolle Wolves
	Tom Van Boken				Cromer KingFishers
	Rik Baats				Brabant Bears
	Joran Schoenmaker				Palau Broncos

== Competitive record ==
Below is a table of the representative rugby league matches played by the Netherlands national rugby league team at test level up until 8 October 2023.

=== Overall ===
Opponents	Matches	Won	Draw	Lost	Points For	Points Against	Pts Difference	Win%
Albania	1	1	0	0	58	18	+40	100%
Belgium	4	0	0	4	46	148	-102	0%
Czech Republic	2	2	0	0	70	38	+32	100%
(Europe) European Combined Nations	1	1	0	0	52	28	+24	100%
Georgia	2	0	0	2	30	91	-61	0%
Germany	10	5	0	5	272	273	-1	50%
Norway	1	1	0	0	58	22	+36	100%
Russia	1	0	0	1	14	40	-26	0%
Scotland A	1	0	0	1	18	22	-4	0%
Scotland	2	1	0	1	37	34	+3	50%
Serbia	3	3	0	0	86	50	+36	100%
Spain	1	1	0	0	36	30	+6	100%
Sweden	2	2	0	0	52	28	+24	100%
Turkey	1	1	0	0	40	18	+22	100%
Total	32	18	0	14	869	840	+29	56.25%

=== European Championship ===
European Championship Record
Year	League	Round	Position	Pld	W	D	L
2021	D	Final	1st	2	2	0	0
2023	B	Cancelled		Qualified			
2025	B	N/A	2nd	2	1	0	1
2026	B	N/A	1st	2	2	0	0

=== Results ===
Date	Home	Score	Away	Competition	Location	Attendance
19 July 2003	Netherlands	18–22	Scotland A	Friendly	Sassenheim, Netherlands	
23 April 2004	Netherlands	24–14	Serbia	Friendly	Rotterdam, Netherlands	
7 May 2004	Netherlands	14–24	Scotland	Friendly	Rotterdam, Netherlands	
29 April 2005	Georgia	34–14	Netherlands	2005 European Championship Qualifiers	Hook of Holland, Netherlands	
18 June 2005	Netherlands	26–10	Serbia	2005 European Championship Qualifiers	Čair Stadium	
29 June 2005	Netherlands	10–17	Scotland	Friendly	Capelle aan den IJssel, Netherlands	
28 April 2006	Netherlands	14–40	Russia	2008 World Cup European Qualifiers	Hook of Holland, Netherlands	
26 May 2006	Georgia	57–16	Netherlands	2008 World Cup European Qualifiers	Mikheil Meskhi Stadium	
17 June 2006	Netherlands	38–26	Serbia	2008 World Cup European Qualifiers	Rotterdam, Netherlands	
5 August 2006	Netherlands	34–28	Czech Republic	Friendly	Rotterdam, Netherlands	
4 May 2013	Germany	28–22	Netherlands	2013 Western Euro Tri-Nations	Heidelberg, Germany	
6 June 2013	Netherlands	6–22	Belgium	2013 Western Euro Tri-Nations	Delft, Netherlands	
3 May 2014	Netherlands	16–70	Germany	2014 Western Euro Tri-Nations	Delft, Netherlands	
28 June 2014	Belgium	32–16	Netherlands	2014 Western Euro Tri-Nations	Brussels, Belgium	
2 May 2015	Netherlands	12–60	Belgium	2015 Western Euro Tri-Nations	Rotterdam, Netherlands	
20 June 2015	Germany	46–12	Netherlands	2015 Western Euro Tri-Nations	Karlsruhe, Germany	
13 August 2016	Netherlands	6–8	Germany	2016 Western Euro Tri-Nations	Rotterdam, Netherlands	
3 September 2016	Belgium	32–12	Netherlands	2016 Western Euro Tri-Nations	Brussels, Belgium	
26 August 2017	Germany	18–30	Netherlands	2017 Griffin Cup	Osnabrück, Germany	
9 September 2017	Netherlands	28–24	Sweden	Friendly	NRCA Stadium	
1 September 2018	Netherlands	38–22	Germany	2018 Griffin Cup	Rotterdam, Netherlands	
22 September 2018	Sweden	4–24	Netherlands	Friendly	Gothenburg, Sweden	
14 September 2019	Germany	18–56	Netherlands	2019 Griffin Cup	Gnarrenburg, Germany	
26 September 2020	Netherlands	20–18	Germany	2020 Griffin Cup	Zwolle, Netherlands	
2 October 2021	Germany	48–16	Netherlands	2021 Griffin Cup	Düsseldorf, Germany	
14 October 2021	Turkey	18–40	Netherlands	2022 Euro D	Bodrum, Turkey	
17 October 2021	Czech Republic	10–36	Netherlands	2022 Euro D	Bodrum, Turkey	
17 September 2022	Spain	36–30	Netherlands	Friendly	Madrid, Spain	
24 September 2022	Netherlands	52–28	(European Union) European Combined Nations	Friendly	Zaandam, Netherlands	
8 October 2022	Netherlands	24–29	Germany	2022 Griffin Cup	Voorschoten, Netherlands	
30 September 2023	Netherlands	88–22	Norway	Friendly	Sassenheim, Netherlands	
7 October 2023	Netherlands	58–18	Albania	Friendly	Zaandam, Netherlands	
21 October 2023	Germany	18–44	Netherlands	2023 Griffin Cup	Hatingen, Germany	
14 September 2024	Netherlands	34–26	Scotland	Friendly	RC Bassets, Sassenheim	
21 September 2024	Netherlands	28–30	Ireland	Friendly	Zaandijk RC, Zaandam	
28 September 2024	Serbia	6–52	Netherlands	Friendly	FC Masinac, Niš	
4 October 2025	Netherlands	0–30	Ireland	Friendly	RC The Bassets, Sassenheim	
12 October 2025	Netherlands	12–56	Ukraine	Friendly	RC Octopus, Uden	
18 October 2025	Malta	6–36	Netherlands	2025 Euro B	Marsa Sports Complex, Marsa	
25 October 2025	Netherlands	4–30	Serbia	2025 Euro B	RC Oysters, Oisterwijk	
11 July 2026	Netherlands	6–34	Canada	Friendly	Rotterdamse RC Beekweg, Rotterdam	
12 September 2026	Netherlands	14–28	Germany	2026 Griffin Cup	Zaandijk Rugby Club, Zaandam	
21 October 2026	Ukraine	22–28	Netherlands	2026 Euro B	FK Zemun Stadium, Belgrade	
24 October 2026	Netherlands	38–30	Serbia	2026 Euro B	FK Zemun Stadium, Belgrade	

== IRL Rankings ==
IRL Men's World Rankings
Official rankings as of August 2026
Rank	Change	Team	Pts %
1	Steady	Australia	100
2	Steady	New Zealand	82
3	Steady	Tonga	70
4	Steady	Samoa	56
5	Steady	England	54
6	Steady	Papua New Guinea	47
7	Steady	Fiji	34
8	▲1	Cook Islands	24
9	▲2	Netherlands	23
10	▲2	Ukraine	21
11	▼3	France	21
12	▼2	Serbia	20
13	Steady	Wales	18
14	Steady	Ireland	17
15	Steady	Greece	14
16	Steady	Malta	14
17	▲12	Canada	13
18	▼1	Italy	11
19	▼1	Jamaica	9
20	▲7	Scotland	8
21	▲1	United States	8
22	▼3	Poland	7
23	▼3	Lebanon	7
24	▼1	Germany	7
25	▼1	Czech Republic	6
26	▼5	Norway	6
27	▼2	Chile	5
28	▲2	Philippines	5
29	▼1	South Africa	4
30	Steady	Brazil	3
31	Steady	Morocco	3
32	▲1	Argentina	3
33	▲2	Ghana	2
34	▲2	Kenya	2
35	▼1	Montenegro	2
36	▲1	Nigeria	2
37	▼5	North Macedonia	1
38	Steady	Albania	1
39	Steady	Turkey	1
40	Steady	Bulgaria	1
41	Steady	Cameroon	0
42	Steady	Japan	0
43	Steady	Spain	0
44	Steady	Colombia	0
45	Steady	Russia	0
46	Steady	El Salvador	0
47	Steady	Bosnia and Herzegovina	0
48	Steady	Hong Kong	0
49	Steady	Solomon Islands	0
50	Steady	Vanuatu	0
51	Steady	Hungary	0
52	Steady	Latvia	0
53	Steady	Denmark	0
54	Steady	Belgium	0
55	Steady	Estonia	0
56	Steady	Sweden	0
57	Steady	Niue	0
Complete rankings at www.internationalrugbyleague.com

== See also ==
- Netherlands Rugby League Bond
- Rugby league in the Netherlands
- Dutch Rugby League Competition
