= 2011 European Shield =

- Duration: 2 Rounds
- Number of teams: 3
- Winners: Germany
- Runners-up: Malta

The competition reverted to a three-team format in 2011, with most of the nations from the 2010 competition taking part in qualifying for the 2013 Rugby League World Cup. Two new teams, Malta and Norway were promoted to the competition having contested the European Bowl in 2010. Germany claimed their first Shield triumph by virtue of points difference after all teams recorded one win.

== Results ==
2011-07-09

Norway	32–28	Germany
Tries: Ingebrigsten (2), N. Haigh, Schmidt, Mellor, L. Haigh; Goals: Meldalen (3), Elgheim	(Report)	Tries: Schoengen, Ayachi, Szehofner, Hoggins, N. Keinhorst; Goals: K. Keinhorst (3)

Bislett Stadion, Oslo

2011-07-23

Germany	36–12	Malta
'Tries: J. Keinhorst (4), Stocks, Isaak; Goals: K. Keinhorst (6)	(Report)	Tries: Sammut, Parker; Goals: Marzella (2)

Hochspeyer

2011-09-02

Malta	64–24	Norway
Tries: Sammut (4), Gilmour (3), Bartlett (2), Criminale, Pavanello; Goals: Sammut (10)	(Report)	Tries: Mellor (2), Meldalen (2), Elgheim; Goals: Meldalen (2)

FC Melita, Pembroke

== Standings ==
Pos	Team	Pld	W	D	L	PF	PA	PD	Pts
1	Germany	2	1	0	1	64	44	+20	2
2	Malta	2	1	0	1	76	60	+16	2
3	Norway	2	1	0	1	56	92	−36	2
