= 2007 European Shield =

- Duration: 2 Rounds
- Number of teams: 3
- Winners: Serbia
- Runners-up: Germany

This is the second time the European Shield took place. Germany and the Czech Republic had little experience having only played a few games beforehand. Serbia were a little more experienced taking players from their domestic league, the Serbian Championship. The shield was hailed as a success in promoting rugby league in the three countries, attendances were good and the players gathered more experience.

== Results ==
2007-07-07

Germany	6–38	Serbia
Try: N.Keinhorst; Conv: M.Keinhorst	(Report)	Tries: Pešić, Radovanović, Vukanović, Matejić, Milanko, Jerković; Conv: Vukanović (6), Matejić

Heidelberg
Attendance: 264

2007-08-04

Czech Republic	22–44	Germany
	(Report)

Prague
Attendance: 200

2007-08-18

Serbia	56–16	Czech Republic
Tries: Pešić (2), Mijušković, Radovanović (2), Jerković (2), Matejić, Brkić, Marko Milosavljević (2); Conv: Brkić (5), Novaković	(Report)	Tries: Holovsky, Priputen, Poledna; Conv: Priputen (2)

FK Radnički Novi Beograd, Belgrade
Attendance: 650

== Standings ==
Team	Played	Won	Drew	Lost	For	Against	Difference
Serbia	2	2	0	0	94	22	+72
Germany	2	1	0	1	52	60	-08
Czech Republic	2	0	0	2	38	100	−62
