= Ukraine national rugby league team =

Ukraine

Team information
- Governing body: Ukrainian Federation of Rugby League
- Region: Europe
- Head coach: Daniel Beardshaw
- Captain: Oleksandr Skorbach
- Most caps: Mikhail Troyan (26)
- Top try-scorer: Oleksandr Skorbach (24)
- Top point-scorer: Oleksandr Skorbach (250)
- Home stadium: Yunist Stadium
- IRL ranking: 10th

Uniforms
First colours

Team results
- First international
- Latvia 6-40 Ukraine (Riga, Latvia; 24 July 2009)
- Biggest win
- Ukraine 112-0 Latvia (Kyiv, Ukraine; 18 September 2010)
- Biggest defeat
- France 74-8 Ukraine (Carcassonne, France; 22nd October 2024)

The Ukraine national rugby league team represents Ukraine in rugby league football.

== History ==
The team made their international debut as part of the 2009 European Bowl.

Ukraine was originally scheduled to play in the 2008 European Bowl, but withdrew at the last minute due to problems with the team's visas.

The national team subsequently made its international debut in the 2009 European Bowl, winning the tournament and securing promotion to the European Shield competition.

The domestic game expanded rapidly in its early years. A four-team national championship was launched in 2009 and grew to six clubs by 2010. The UFRL also introduced a national cup competition and youth development programmes, helping establish rugby league in several regions of the country, particularly in Kharkiv and Donetsk.

During the early 2010s, Ukraine competed regularly in European international competitions and recorded notable victories against emerging rugby league nations. The national team won additional European Bowl titles in 2013 and 2016, establishing itself as one of the stronger developing nations in European rugby league. The federation's growth was recognised in 2013 when it became a full member of the Rugby League European Federation.

The outbreak of conflict in eastern Ukraine in 2014 created significant challenges for the sport. Several of the country's strongest rugby league clubs were located in the Donetsk region and were directly affected by the fighting. In response, the federation restructured its competitions and shifted much of its administration and development activity westward, operating separate eastern and western conferences where possible. Despite these difficulties, domestic and international programmes continued.

By the early 2020s, rugby league in Ukraine had grown to include multiple clubs, junior programmes and national representative teams. However, Russia's full-scale invasion of Ukraine in February 2022 severely disrupted domestic competition. Many players, coaches and officials became involved in military service or territorial defence activities, while sporting infrastructure across the country was affected by the war. Despite these challenges, Ukraine continued to participate in international rugby league through the support of the European Rugby League and the commitment of players and volunteers.

In 2022, Ukraine successfully fielded an Under-19 national team at the European Championships, demonstrating the resilience of the sport despite wartime conditions. As the conflict continued, the federation increasingly explored heritage-based player pathways, particularly in Australia and other countries with Ukrainian diaspora communities.

During 2023 and 2024, Ukraine strengthened its international programme through the inclusion of players of Ukrainian heritage. The national team achieved improved results in European competition, including victories over Greece, and rose significantly in the International Rugby League world rankings. The heritage programme attracted players from Australia and elsewhere, while maintaining connections with players and officials within Ukraine. By 2024, the federation was using international participation as a means of maintaining the visibility and continuity of rugby league during one of the most challenging periods in the country's history.

Despite the ongoing Russian invasion of Ukraine and the disruption to domestic sporting activities, Ukraine Rugby League continued to participate in international competition through a combination of domestic and heritage-based players. In 2024, the national team expanded its player pathway by incorporating athletes of Ukrainian heritage from Australia and other countries, helping to strengthen the squad for European Championship competition.

Ukraine achieved significant success in the 2025 European Rugby League Championships. Competing in Euro C against Italy and Greece, Ukraine won both matches to finish first in the group and secure promotion to Euro B for the 2026 season. Due to the ongoing war in Ukraine, the tournament was played at a centralised venue in Italy rather than on a home-and-away basis.

The squad featured several players from the Ukrainian diaspora, including New Zealand Warriors halfback Jett Cleary, who qualified through his Ukrainian heritage. Cleary played a key role in Ukraine's successful campaign as the nation secured victories over Italy and Greece and earned promotion to the next tier of European competition.

The success of the national team has coincided with increased engagement from Ukrainian heritage communities, particularly in Australia, where heritage representative programmes have been established to identify and develop players eligible for future international representation. These initiatives have helped maintain the visibility and growth of rugby league within the Ukrainian community during a challenging period for sport in the country.

== Competitive record ==
=== Overall ===
Source: Rugby League Project

| Opponent | First Played | Played | Win | Draw | Loss | Points For | Points Against | Last Meeting |
|---|---|---|---|---|---|---|---|---|
| Czech Republic | 2013 | 4 | 4 | 0 | 0 | 260 | 22 | 2024 |
| Estonia | 2009 | 1 | 1 | 0 | 0 | 86 | 0 | 2009 |
| France | 2024 | 1 | 0 | 0 | 1 | 8 | 74 | 2024 |
| Netherlands | 2025 | 1 | 1 | 0 | 0 | 56 | 12 | 2025 |
| Greece | 2018 | 4 | 3 | 0 | 1 | 122 | 70 | 2025 |
| Italy | 2014 | 4 | 1 | 0 | 3 | 68 | 166 | 2025 |
| Latvia | 2009 | 2 | 2 | 0 | 0 | 152 | 6 | 2010 |
| Malta | 2018 | 1 | 1 | 0 | 0 | 34 | 22 | 2018 |
| Norway | 2013 | 1 | 1 | 0 | 0 | 42 | 14 | 2013 |
| Russia | 2010 | 5 | 1 | 0 | 4 | 152 | 164 | 2021 |
| Serbia | 2011 | | 0 | 0 | 4 | 50 | 218 | 2024 |
| Total | 2009 | 24 | 12 | 0 | 12 | 1030 | 768 | 2025 |

=== Results ===
| Date | Score | Opponent | Competition | Venue | Attendance |
|---|---|---|---|---|---|
| 6 July 2009 | 40–6 | Latvia | 2009 Euro C | (Latvia) Upezhtsiems Stadium, Riga | |
| 28 September 2009 | 86–0 | Estonia | 2009 Euro C | (Latvia) Upezhtsiems Stadium, Riga | |
| 26 June 2010 | 14–62 | Russia | 2009 Euro B | (Russia) Vereya Stadium, Vereya | |
| 18 September 2010 | 112–0 | Latvia | 2009 Euro B | (Ukraine) Arsenal Stadium, Kyiv | |
| 6 July 2013 | 42–14 | Norway | 2013 Euro C | (Ukraine) Dinamo Stadium, Kharkiv | |
| 28 September 2013 | 68–4 | Czech Republic | 2013 Euro C | (Czech Republic) Municipal Stadium, Vrchlabí | |
| 17 May 2014 | 14–40 | Serbia | 2014–15 Euro B | (Serbia) Zeleznicar Stadium, Nis | |
| 24 May 2014 | 24–18 | Russia | 2014–15 Euro B | (Russia) Vereya Stadium, Vereya | |
| 5 July 2014 | 12–54 | Italy | 2014–15 Euro B | (Italy) Stadio Comunale, Gemona del Friuli | |
| 4 July 2015 | 20–34 | Russia | 2014–15 Euro B | (Serbia) Makiš Stadium, Belgrade | |
| 18 July 2015 | 12–40 | Italy | 2014–15 Euro B | National University of Ukraine, Irpin | |
| 12 September 2015 | 4–64 | Serbia | 2014–15 Euro B | (Ukraine) FC Locomotive Stadium, Chop | |
| 25 June 2016 | 46–6 | Czech Republic | 2016 Euro C | (Ukraine) Lviv | |
| 8 October 2016 | 62–12 | Czech Republic | 2016 Euro C | (Czech Republic) Prague | |
| 30 June 2018 | 34–22 | Malta | 2018 Euro C | (Malta) Marsa Sports Complex, Marsa | |
| 8 September 2018 | 26–28 | Greece | 2018 Euro C | (Ukraine) Dynamo Stadium, Kharkiv | |
| 6 October 2021 | 96–18 | Russia | 2021 Euro B | (Serbia) FK Heroj Polet, Belgrade | |
| 9 October 2021 | 18–54 | Serbia | 2021 Euro B | (Serbia) FK Heroj Polet, Belgrade | |
| 28 October 2023 | 38–24 | Greece | Unity Cup | (Greece) Gkorytsa Stadium, Aspropygos | |
| 29 October 2023 | 24–12 | Greece | Unity Cup | (Greece) Goudi Municipality Stadium, Zografou | |
| 18 October 2024 | 0–84 | Czech Republic | Friendly | (Czech Republic) City Stadium, Letohrad | |
| 22 October 2024 | 8–74 | France | 2026 World Cup European Qualifiers | (France) Stade Albert Domec, Carcassonne | 1,257 |
| 26 October 2024 | 10–50 | Serbia | Friendly | (France) Stade Municipal, Saint-Estève | |
| 12 October 2025 | 56–12 | Netherlands | Friendly | (Netherlands) RC Octopus, Uden | |
| 18 October 2025 | 44–20 | Italy | 2025 Euro C | (Italy) Pasian di Prato stadium, Udine | |
| 22 October 2025 | 34–6 | Greece | 2025 Euro C | (Italy) Pasian di Prato stadium, Udine | |
| 18 October 2026 | 30–18 | Serbia | 2026 Euro B | (Serbia) FK Zemun Stadium, Belgrade | |
| 21 October 2026 | 22–28 | Netherlands | 2026 Euro B | (Serbia) FK Zemun Stadium, Belgrade | |

== IRL Rankings ==
IRL Men's World Rankings
Official rankings as of August 2026
| Rank | Change | Team | Pts % |
| 1 | Steady | Australia | 100 |
| 2 | Steady | New Zealand | 82 |
| 3 | Steady | England | 70 |
| 4 | Steady | Samoa | 56 |
| 5 | Steady | Tonga | 54 |
| 6 | Steady | Papua New Guinea | 47 |
| 7 | Steady | Fiji | 34 |
| 8 | ▲1 | Cook Islands | 24 |
| 9 | ▲2 | Netherlands | 23 |
| 10 | ▲2 | Ukraine | 21 |
| 11 | ▼3 | France | 21 |
| 12 | ▼2 | Serbia | 20 |
| 13 | Steady | Wales | 18 |
| 14 | Steady | Ireland | 17 |
| 15 | Steady | Greece | 14 |
| 16 | Steady | Malta | 14 |
| 17 | ▲12 | Canada | 13 |
| 18 | ▼1 | Italy | 11 |
| 19 | ▼1 | Jamaica | 9 |
| 20 | ▲7 | Scotland | 8 |
| 21 | ▲1 | United States | 8 |
| 22 | ▼3 | Poland | 7 |
| 23 | ▼3 | Lebanon | 7 |
| 24 | ▼1 | Germany | 7 |
| 25 | ▼1 | Czech Republic | 6 |
| 26 | ▼5 | Norway | 6 |
| 27 | ▼2 | Chile | 5 |
| 28 | ▲2 | Philippines | 5 |
| 29 | ▼1 | South Africa | 4 |
| 30 | Steady | Brazil | 3 |
| 31 | Steady | Morocco | 3 |
| 32 | ▲1 | Argentina | 3 |
| 33 | ▲2 | Ghana | 2 |
| 34 | ▲2 | Kenya | 2 |
| 35 | ▼1 | Montenegro | 2 |
| 36 | ▲1 | Nigeria | 2 |
| 37 | ▼5 | North Macedonia | 1 |
| 38 | Steady | Albania | 1 |
| 39 | Steady | Turkey | 1 |
| 40 | Steady | Bulgaria | 1 |
| 41 | Steady | Cameroon | 0 |
| 42 | Steady | Japan | 0 |
| 43 | Steady | Spain | 0 |
| 44 | Steady | Colombia | 0 |
| 45 | Steady | Russia | 0 |
| 46 | Steady | El Salvador | 0 |
| 47 | Steady | Bosnia and Herzegovina | 0 |
| 48 | Steady | Hong Kong | 0 |
| 49 | Steady | Solomon Islands | 0 |
| 50 | Steady | Vanuatu | 0 |
| 51 | Steady | Hungary | 0 |
| 52 | Steady | Latvia | 0 |
| 53 | Steady | Denmark | 0 |
| 54 | Steady | Belgium | 0 |
| 55 | Steady | Estonia | 0 |
| 56 | Steady | Sweden | 0 |
| 57 | Steady | Niue | 0 |
Complete rankings at www.internationalrugbyleague.com

== See also ==
- Sports in Ukraine
