= Czech Republic national rugby league team =

Czech Republic

Team information
- Governing body: Czech Rugby League Association
- Region: Europe
- Head coach: Ladislav Cintler
- Captain: Jarda Stribro
- Most caps: Michal Priputen (10); Tomas Holovsky (10)
- IRL ranking: 25th

Uniforms
First colours

Team results
- First game
- (United Kingdom) British Student Pioneers 29–8 Czech Republic (Prague, Czech Republic; 2006)
- Biggest win
- Czech Republic 30–4 Germany (Olomouc, Czech Republic; 2009)
- Biggest defeat
- Germany 96–0 Czech Republic (Hochspeyer, Germany; 2010)

The Czech Republic national rugby league team was established to broaden the skills of the rugby union team. The team has competed in a number of competitions and hosted the Slavic Cup in 2006.

== History ==
The Czech Association of Rugby League (CZARL) began life in early 2006, under the guidance of former Czech rugby union international Milan Mrtýnek and Englishman Iain Sellers.

The squad's first training session, in February 2006, was held in an indoor basketball hall because of an extremely fierce Czech winter. From these modest beginnings, the Czech Republic team, with support from the Rugby League European Federation, struggled to play four full games in their debut season.

Perhaps inevitably, given the unfamiliarity of the game, the Czech Republic lost all four matches, and the margins of defeat were not narrow. The Czechs played their first two games against the touring British Student Pioneers team. A 29–2 loss in Prague was followed by a less encouraging 34–2 defeat in Olomouc.

This was followed by the first away trip to Rotterdam to face the Netherlands Tasman team, where the newcomers were narrowly defeated 34–28. In their final game of the season, also in Prague, the Czechs were beaten 36–28 by Serbia, in the inaugural "Slavic Cup" match between the two countries.

In 2007 The Czech Republic played in the European Shield tournament against the Germany and Serbia. This saw them travel to Belgrade to play Serbia and Germany travelled to Prague. Both games were lost. The Serbia game doubled again as a Slavic Cup match. In 2008 the Czech Republic team once again competed in the European Shield along with Italy and Germany, with a domestic competition in u16, u18 and Senior level.

In 2011, the Czech Rugby League Association was admitted to affiliate membership of the Rugby League European Federation after reforming its governance.

== Competitive record ==
The following is a summary of tournaments and results for the Czech Republic National Rugby League Team.

=== European Championship ===
European Championship Record
Year	League	Position	Pld	W	D	L
2021	D	2nd	2	1	0	1
2025	D	3rd	2	0	0	2
2026	D	TBC				

== IRL Rankings ==
IRL Men's World Rankings
Official rankings as of August 2026
Rank	Change	Team	Pts %
1	Steady	Australia	100
2	Steady	New Zealand	82
3	Steady	England	70
4	Steady	Samoa	56
5	Steady	Tonga	54
6	Steady	Papua New Guinea	47
7	Steady	Fiji	34
8	▲1	Cook Islands	24
9	▲2	Netherlands	23
10	▲2	Ukraine	21
11	▼3	France	21
12	▼2	Serbia	20
13	Steady	Wales	18
14	Steady	Ireland	17
15	Steady	Greece	14
16	Steady	Malta	14
17	▲12	Canada	13
18	▼1	Italy	11
19	▼1	Jamaica	9
20	▲7	Scotland	8
21	▲1	United States	8
22	▼3	Poland	7
23	▼3	Lebanon	7
24	▼1	Germany	7
25	▼1	Czech Republic	6
26	▼5	Norway	6
27	▼2	Chile	5
28	▲2	Philippines	5
29	▼1	South Africa	4
30	Steady	Brazil	3
31	Steady	Morocco	3
32	▲1	Argentina	3
33	▲2	Ghana	2
34	▲2	Kenya	2
35	▼1	Montenegro	2
36	▲1	Nigeria	2
37	▼5	North Macedonia	1
38	Steady	Albania	1
39	Steady	Turkey	1
40	Steady	Bulgaria	1
41	Steady	Cameroon	0
42	Steady	Japan	0
43	Steady	Spain	0
44	Steady	Colombia	0
45	Steady	Russia	0
46	Steady	El Salvador	0
47	Steady	Bosnia and Herzegovina	0
48	Steady	Hong Kong	0
49	Steady	Solomon Islands	0
50	Steady	Vanuatu	0
51	Steady	Hungary	0
52	Steady	Latvia	0
53	Steady	Denmark	0
54	Steady	Belgium	0
55	Steady	Estonia	0
56	Steady	Sweden	0
57	Steady	Niue	0
Complete rankings at www.internationalrugbyleague.com

== See also ==
- Rugby league in the Czech Republic
