= List of Russia national rugby league team results =

The following list is of the results of the Russia national rugby league team. Russia played their first match in 1991 as the Soviet Union, and played four more matches as the Commonwealth of Independent States (CIS).

== Results ==
=== 1990s ===
Date	Home	Score	Away	Competition	Location	Attendance
27 October 1991	France	26–6	Soviet Union	Friendly		
18 June 1992	Commonwealth of Independent States	8–28	France	Friendly		
11 November 1992	France	38–4	Commonwealth of Independent States	Friendly		
13 November 1992	South Africa	26–30	Commonwealth of Independent States	1992 CIS Tour of South Africa	Milpark Stadium, Johannesburg	2,000
18 November, 1992	(Western Cape) Western Province	22–12	Commonwealth of Independent States	1992 CIS Tour of South Africa	Goodwood, Cape Town	1,500
20 November 1992	South Africa	19–22	Commonwealth of Independent States	1992 CIS Tour of South Africa	Berea Park, Pretoria	3,000
5 June 1993	Russia	14–30	France	Friendly		
20 August 1995	United States	12–19	Russia	Friendly	Kezar Stadium, San Francisco	
16 October 1995	Scotland	34–9	Russia	1995 Emerging Nations Tournament	Post Office Road, Featherstone	3,133
18 October 1995	Cook Islands	58–20	Russia	1995 Emerging Nations Tournament	Hilton Park, Leigh	1,921
20 October 1995	Russia	28–26	United States	1995 Emerging Nations Tournament	Wilderspool, Warrington	1,950

=== 2000s ===
Date	Home	Score	Away	Competition	Location	Attendance
3 July 2000	France	82–0	Russia	Friendly		
29 October 2000	Fiji	38–12	Russia	2000 World Cup	Craven Park, Hull	2,187
1 November 2000	England	76–4	Russia	2000 World Cup	Knowsley Road, St Helens	5,736
4 November 2000	Australia	110–4	Russia	2000 World Cup	The Boulevard, Hull	3,044
13 September 2002	Russia	54–10	United States	Friendly	Luzhniki Stadium, Moscow	30,000
6 May 2003	Russia	44–14	United States	Friendly	Luzhniki Stadium, Moscow	
9 May 2003	Russia	12–29	France	Friendly	Luzhniki Stadium, Moscow	
26 October 2003	Wales	74–4	Russia	2003 European Nations Cup	Talbot Athletic Ground, Port Talbot	1,082
2 November 2003	England Knights	102–0	Russia	2003 European Nations Cup	Odsal Stadium, Bradford	1,376
12 May 2004	Russia	64–8	United States	Friendly		
16 May 2004	Russia	64–6	Ireland	Friendly		
16 October 2004	Russia	10–58	France	2004 European Nations Cup	Luzhniki Stadium, Moscow	2,000
24 October 2004	Russia	4–98	England	2004 European Nations Cup	Luzhniki Stadium, Moscow	1,000
16 October 2005	France	80–0	Russia	2005 European Nations Cup	Stade Fernand Fournier, Arles	1,000
23 October 2005	Russia	48–14	Georgia	2005 European Nations Cup	Luzhniki Stadium, Moscow	500
4 February 2006	Georgia	46–19	Russia	Friendly	Locomotiv Stadium, Tbilisi	
28 April 2006	Netherlands	14–40	Russia	2008 World Cup qualifying	Hoekse Boys FC, Rotterdam	250
4 June 2006	Serbia	6–44	Russia	2008 World Cup qualifying	FK Radnički Beograd, Belgrade	500
22 June 2006	Russia	24–0	Georgia	2008 World Cup qualifying	Luzhniki Stadium, Moscow	
22 October 2006	Russia	12–50	Ireland	2008 World Cup qualifying	Sili Stadium, Moscow	120
28 October 2006	Lebanon	22–8	Russia	2008 World Cup qualifying	New River Stadium, London	300
20 October 2007	Ireland	58–18	Russia	2008 World Cup qualifying	Carlow Oval, Dublin	986
27 October 2007	Russia	0–48	Lebanon	2008 World Cup qualifying	Nara Stadium, Naro-Fominsk	1,426
20 September 2008	Serbia	4–30	Russia	2008 RLEF Euro Med Challenge	FK Kabel, Novi Sad	500
28 September 2008	Russia	80–0	Lebanon	2008 RLEF Euro Med Challenge	Nara Stadium, Naro-Fominsk	2,000

=== 2010s ===
Date	Home	Score	Away	Competition	Location	Attendance	Report
27 June 2010	Russia	52–14	Ukraine	2010 European Shield	Nara Stadium, Naro-Fominsk		
31 July 2010	Latvia	4–54	Russia	2010 European Shield	Upezhtsiems Stadium, Riga		
10 September 2011	Ukraine	76–4	Russia	2011 Milan Kosanovic Cup	Dynamo Stadium, Kharkiv		
16 October 2011	Italy	92–6	Russia	2013 World Cup qualification	Stadio Plebiscito, Padua	2,100	
22 October 2011	Russia	0–32	Lebanon	2013 World Cup qualification	Vereya Stadium, Vereya		
29 October 2011	Serbia	28–36	Russia	2013 World Cup qualification	Makiš Stadium, Belgrade		
19 May 2012	Germany	26–32	Russia	2012–13 European Shield	Fritz-Grunebaum-Sportpark, Karlsruhe		
8 September 2012	Russia	32–18	Italy	2012–13 European Shield	Nara Stadium, Naro-Fominsk	350	
22 September 2012	Russia	21–20	Serbia	2012–13 European Shield	Nara Stadium, Naro-Fominsk		
25 May 2013	Serbia	10–24	Russia	2012–13 European Shield	Makiš Stadium, Belgrade		
29 June 2013	Italy	38–18	Russia	2012–13 European Shield	Stadio Augusteo, Monselice		
10 August 2013	Russia	30–0	Germany	2012–13 European Shield			
24 May 2014	Russia	24–18	Ukraine	2014–15 European Championship B	Vereya Stadium, Vereya		
21 June 2014	Russia	20–6	Serbia	2014–15 European Championship B	Nara Stadium, Naro-Fominsk		
26 July 2014	Italy	22–18	Russia	2014–15 European Championship B	Stadio Comunale, Trieste		
16 May 2015	Serbia	20–15	Russia	2014–15 European Championship B	Makiš Stadium, Belgrade	500	
4 July 2015	Ukraine	20–34	Russia	2014–15 European Championship B	Makiš Stadium, Belgrade	150	
12 September 2015	Russia	26–6	Italy	2014–15 European Championship B	Fily Stadium, Moscow	1,000	
15 October 2016	Russia	40–6	Spain	2017 World Cup qualification	Fily Stadium, Moscow	427	
30 October 2016	Ireland	70–16	Russia	2017 World Cup qualification	Carlisle Grounds, Dublin	867	
4 November 2016	Italy	76–0	Russia	2017 World Cup qualification	Leigh Sports Village, Leigh	450	
6 October 2018	Spain	32–24	Russia	2018 European Championship B	Poliesportiu Quatre Carreres, Valencia		
13 October 2018	Russia	36–18	Serbia	2018 European Championship B	Vereya Stadium, Vereya	300	

=== 2020s ===
Date	Home	Score	Away	Competition	Location	Attendance	Report
3 October 2021	Serbia	66–10	Russia	2021 European Championship B	Paracin Stadium, Kragujevac	500	
6 October 2021	Russia	18–96	Ukraine	2021 European Championship B	FK Heroj Polet, Belgrade		
