= List of Greece national rugby league team results =

The following is a list of results for the Greece national rugby league team since their first match in 2003, where they defeated New Caledonia 26–10. They have played 37 matches, winning 22 and losing 15. Their most recent result was a 34–26 win against Norway.

== All time record ==
Team	First played	Played	Win	Draw	Loss	Win %	Points for	Points against	Point difference	Last played
Bosnia and Herzegovina	2014	1	1	0	0	100.00	58	4	+54	2014
Bulgaria	2017	1	1	0	0	100.00	68	8	+60	2017
Czech Republic	2014	1	1	0	0	100.00	68	16	+52	2014
England	2022	1	0	0	1	0.00	4	94	-90	2022
France	2022	1	0	0	1	0.00	12	34	-22	2022
Hungary	2013	3	2	0	1	66.67	134	38	+96	2018
Italy	2003	3	1	0	2	33.33	72	98	-26	2009
Japan	2016	1	1	0	0	100.00	72	0	+72	2016
Malta	2005	4	2	0	2	50.00	114	76	+38	2018
New Caledonia	2003	2	2	0	0	100.00	82	18	+64	2004
Niue	2018	1	0	0	1	0.00	8	16	-8	2018
Norway	2019	3	3	0	0	100.00	126	58	+68	2024
Portugal	2009	1	1	0	0	100.00	42	16	+26	2009
Samoa	2022	1	0	0	1	0.00	4	72	-68	2022
Scotland	2019	1	0	0	1	0.00	24	42	-18	2019
Serbia	2006	5	3	0	2	60.00	190	144	+46	2023
Spain	2014	1	0	0	1	0.00	4	76	-72	2014
Turkey	2019	1	1	0	0	100.00	38	24	+14	2019
Ukraine	2018	3	1	0	2	33.33	64	88	-24	2023
Vanuatu	2012	2	2	0	0	100.00	64	14	+50	2018
Total	2003	37	22	0	15	59.46	1248	936	+312	2024

== Results ==
=== 2000s ===
Date	Home	Result	Away	Competition	Venue	Attendance	Source
31 August 2003	Greece	26 – 10	New Caledonia	Friendly	Norford Park, Sydney	200	
27 September 2003	Italy	26 – 24	Greece	International	OKI Jubilee Stadium, Sydney	4,000	
6 March 2004	Greece	56 – 8	New Caledonia	Friendly			
2 October 2004	Italy	58 – 14	Greece	International	Marconi Stadium, Sydney	1,500	
8 October 2005	Malta	24 – 22	Greece	International	Fairfax Community Stadium, Sydney	1,500	
28 October 2006	Greece	44 – 26	Serbia	Friendly			
10 October 2009	Greece	42 – 16	Portugal	2009 Australian Mediterranean Shield			
17 October 2009	Greece	34 – 14	Italy	2009 Australian Mediterranean Shield			

=== 2010s ===
Date	Home	Result	Away	Competition	Venue	Attendance	Source
20 October 2012	Vanuatu	14 – 26	Greece	Friendly	Port Vila Municipal Stadium, Port Vila	3,513	
27 October 2013	Hungary	0 – 90	Greece	International	Iharos Sándor Margitszigeti Atlétikai Centrum, Budapest	1,013	
28 June 2014	Malta	18 – 32	Greece	2014 Rugby League European Championship C	Gianni Bencini Ground, St. Julian's		
11 October 2014	Greece	68 – 16	Czech Republic	2014 Rugby League European Championship C	Gloritsa Field, Athens	400	
17 October 2014	Bosnia and Herzegovina	4 – 58	Greece	2014 Balkans Cup	Makiš Stadium, Belgrade		
19 October 2014	Serbia	22 – 50	Greece	2014 Balkans Cup	Makiš Stadium, Belgrade	500	
10 October 2015	Malta	30 – 0	Greece	2015 Rugby League European Championship C	Marsa Sports Complex, Marsa,		
17 October 2015	Greece	4 – 76	Spain	2015 Rugby League European Championship C	Nikaia Municipal Stadium, Athens		
8 October 2016	Japan	0 – 72	Greece	International	Katsushika City Sogo Sports Centre, Tokyo		
6 October 2017	Greece	68 – 8	Bulgaria	2017 Balkans Cup	Stadion FK Rakovica, Belgrade	50	
8 October 2017	Serbia	50 – 8	Greece	2017 Balkans Cup	Makiš Stadium, Belgrade	150	
8 September 2018	Ukraine	26 – 28	Greece	2018–19 Rugby League European Championship C South	Dynamo Stadium, Kharkiv	700	
15 September 2018	Greece	60 – 4	Malta	2018–19 Rugby League European Championship C South	Glyka Stadium, Athens	200	
1 October 2018	Hungary	20 – 18	Greece	2018 Emerging Nations World Championship	Windsor Sporting Complex, Windsor	750	
7 October 2018	Greece	38 – 0	Vanuatu	2018 Emerging Nations World Championship	Kellyville Ridge Reserve, Sydney	125	
10 October 2018	Niue	16 – 8	Greece	2018 Emerging Nations World Championship	New Era Stadium, Sydney	450	
13 October 2018	Greece	26 – 8	Hungary	2018 Emerging Nations World Championship	New Era Stadium, Sydney	350	
18 May 2019	Greece	56 – 26	Norway	2018–19 Rugby League European Championship C Final	New River Stadium, London	608	
14 September 2019	Turkey	24 – 38	Greece	International	Aysekadin Yerleskesi Futbol Stadium, Istanbul	150	
1 November 2019	Greece	24 – 42	Scotland	2019 Rugby League European play-off tournament	New River Stadium, London	350	
9 November 2019	Serbia	6 – 82	Greece	2019 Rugby League European play-off tournament	Makiš Stadium, Belgrade	180	

=== 2020s ===
Date	Home	Result	Away	Competition	Venue	Attendance	Source
17 October 2022	France	34–12	Greece	2021 Rugby League World Cup	Eco-Power Stadium, Doncaster	4,182	
23 October 2022	Samoa	72–4	Greece	2021 Rugby League World Cup	Eco-Power Stadium, Doncaster	4,415	
29 October 2022	England	94–4	Greece	2021 Rugby League World Cup	Bramall Lane, Sheffield	18,760	
13 May 2023	Greece	6–40	Serbia	International	Nea Smyrni Stadium	1,000	
28 October 2023	Greece	24–38	Ukraine	Unity Cup	Gkorytsa Stadium, Aspropygos		
29 October 2023	Greece	12–24	Ukraine	Unity Cup	Goudi Municipality Stadium		
4 November 2023	Norway	6–36	Greece	International	Øster Hus Arena, Sandnes		
25 May 2024	Greece	34–26	Norway	International	Agios Dimitrios Municipal Stadium		
28 February 2025	United States	10–46	Greece	International	Silver Bowl Park, Las Vegas		
11 October 2025	Poland	34–38	Greece	International	St Mary's Stadium, Sydney		
22 October 2025	Greece	6–34	Ukraine	2025 Euro C	Pasian di Prato stadium, Udine		
25 October 2025	Italy	14–36	Greece	2025 Euro C	Pasian di Prato stadium, Udine		
10 October 2026	Malta	18–20	Greece	2026 Euro C	Hibernians Rugby Pitch, Paola		
17 October 2026	Greece	68–14	Germany	2026 Euro C	Elena Venizelou Stadium, Chania		
