= 2018 Rugby League European Championship B =

2018 European Championship B
- Number of teams: 3
- Winner: Russia (3rd title)
- Matches played: 3
- Points scored: 154 (51.33 per match)
- Tries scored: 29 (9.67 per match)
- Top scorer: (Russia) Aleksandr Lysokon (28)
- Top try scorers: (Russia) Aleksandr Lysokon (3) (Spain) Romain Pallares (3)

The 2018 Rugby League European Championship B (also known as Euro B) was ninth edition of the Rugby League European Championship B and acted as the second phase of European qualifying to the 2021 Rugby League World Cup. The series involved three teams in pool play and took place in October 2018. The two highest ranked teams, Russia and Spain, advanced to the European play-off. In August 2019, Russia withdrew from the play-off tournament and were replaced by Serbia.

== Standings ==
Pos	Team	Pld	W	D	L	PF	PA	PD	Pts	Qualification
1	Russia	2	1	0	1	60	50	+10	2	Qualification for 2021 World Cup European qualification tournament
2	Spain	2	1	0	1	52	48	+4	2	Qualification for 2021 World Cup European qualification tournament
3	Serbia	2	1	0	1	42	56	−14	2	

Source: ERL

== Fixtures ==
6 October 2018
15:00 CEST (UTC+02:00)

Spain	32–24	Russia
Tries: Pallares (3), Doutres (2), Franco, Puerta; Goals: Franco (1/3), R. Garcia (1/1), Delgado (0/2), Olivares (0/1), Pallares (0/1)	Report	Tries: Danilov, Konstantinov, Leskov, Lysokon; Goals: Lysokon (4/5)

Poliesportiu Quatre Carreres, Valencia
Referee: Geoffrey Poumes (France)
Player of the Match: Romain Pallares (Spain)

Team details

FB	9	Luc Franco
WG	2	Dani Morales
CE	3	Antonio Puerta
CE	4	Alex Doutres
WG	5	Hadriel Mehamed Gonzalez
FE	16	Daniel Garcia
HB	7	Romain Pallares
PR	8	Carlos Font
HK	1	Chris Lopez
PR	10	Adria Alonso
SR	11	Anthony Delgado
SR	12	Kevin Aparicio
LK	15	Raul Simo (c)
Interchange:
BE	14	Aitor Romero
BE	17	Juan Mudarra
BE	18	Rafael Garcia
BE	19	Miguel Olivares
Coach:
Darren Fisher

FB	1	Iustin Petrushka
WG	2	Ilia Danilov
CE	3	Igor Abramov
CE	4	Boris Voloskov
WG	5	Andrey Lavrushin
FE	6	Aleksandr Lysokon
HB	7	Denis Tyulenev
PR	8	Sergei Konstantinov (c)
HK	9	Aleksandr Naumov
PR	10	Kirill Bozhko
SR	11	Dmitrii Leskov
SR	12	Vladislav Lesnikov
LK	13	Ivan Troitskii
Interchange:
BE	14	Igor Chuprin
BE	15	Vyacheslav Eremin
BE	16	Andrey Perin
BE	17	Dmitrii Tarasenkov
Coach:
Denis Korolev

Serbia were without their Australian-based players, David Andjelić, Brandon Janjić, Jonathan Kress, and Ilija Radan, along with head coach Brett Davidson due to VISA issues. The Serbian Rugby League allege that Russia's Association of Rugby League Clubs did not provide the necessary paperwork for VISA removal.

13 October 2018
15:00 MSK (UTC+03:00)

Russia	36–18	Serbia
Tries: Lysokon (2), Konstantinov, Leskov, Lesnikov, Orlov, Zagoskin; Goals: Lysokon (4/8)	Report	Tries: Jašari, Keglić, Trifunović; Goals: Vo. Dedić (3/4)

Fili Stadium, Moscow
Attendance: 300
Referee: Liam Moore (England)
Player of the Match: Aleksandr Lysokon (Russia)

20 October 2018
14:30 CEST (UTC+02:00)

Serbia	24–20	Spain
Tries: Janjić, Kress, Milutinović, Stevanović, Zogović; Goals: Vo. Dedić (2/5)	Report	Tries: Delgado, Franco, Simo; Goals: R. Garcia (4/5)

Makiš Stadium, Belgrade
Attendance: 150
Referee: Tom Grant (England)
Player of the Match: Luc Franco (Spain)
