= Balkans Cup (rugby league) =

Rugby league

- Sport: Rugby league
- Instituted: 2014
- Number of teams: 8
- Country: Albania; Bulgaria; Bosnia and Herzegovina; Greece; Hungary; Serbia; Turkey; Montenegro (RLEF)
- Holders: Serbia (1st title)
- Most titles: Greece; Serbia (1 title)

The Balkans Cup is a rugby league football tournament for Balkan nations. It was first held in 2014, with Serbia, Greece, Hungary and Bosnia each playing against a random first round opponent, then the losing teams contesting the 3rd place match, and the winning teams battling it out in the Grand Final. Greece were crowned inaugural Balkans Cup winners. The Balkans Cup is contested biennially with four teams and the most recent one was held in 2017, with Bulgaria joining the competition. It is run by the Rugby League European Federation.

In June 2021 there was no Balkan Cup, but Serbia toured Bosnia, Bulgaria and Montenegro, winning all three games.

== Results ==
Year	Host	Winners	Score	Runner–up	Venue	Attendance
2014	Serbia	Greece	50–22	Serbia	(Serbia) Makiš Stadium	450
2017	Serbia	Serbia	50–8	Greece	(Serbia) Stadion "FK Heroj"	150
2019						

== See also ==
- List of international rugby league teams
