= Vladica Nikolic =

Serbia international rugby league fottballer

Personal information
- Full name: Vladica Nikolic
- Born: 1 March 1992 (age 34) Serbia,
- Height: 6 ft 2 in (189 cm)
- Weight: 16 st 7 lb (105 kg)

Playing information
- Position: Prop, Second-row, Lock
Club
Years	Team	Pld	T	G	FG	P
2012–2014	Red Star	57	23			228
2014–2015	RC Roanne XIII	14	7			28
2015–2016	La Réole XIII	18	8			32
2016–2022	Villeneuve	69	26			104
2022-	Villefranche XIII Aveyron	44	16			64
	Total	202	80	0	0	456
Representative
Years	Team	Pld	T	G	FG	P
2012-	Serbia	33
- As of 11 January 2021

Vladica Nikolic (born 1 March 1992) is a Serbian former professional Rugby league football player who played as a prop and lock for Villefranche XIII Aveyron in the Super XIII, where he is now coaching. He has also represented the Serbian international rugby league team.

== Career ==
Nikolic was born in Vranje Serbia. He started his rugby career in Red Star. With whom he was several times the champion in the Serbian Rugby League and Balkan Super League. He has been playing in France for the last thirteen years and currently in Villefranche XIII Aveyron. He won the Elite 2 championship twice (La Réole XIII and Villefranche XIII Aveyron) and with national team he won Rugby League European Championship B 2014/15, 2020 and 2026.
