= 2017 Rugby League World Cup qualification =

Tournament details
- Dates: 9 May 2015 – 29 October 2016
- Teams: 13 (from 4 confederations)

Tournament statistics
- Matches played: 28

The 2017 Rugby League World Cup qualifying process began on 9 May 2015 with the 2015 European Championship C. In August 2014, it was announced that seven of the eight quarter-finalists at the 2013 tournament would receive automatic qualification. Fourteen teams took part in the qualifying process to fill the remaining seven spots.

== Background ==
Eight teams automatically qualified for the World Cup. Seven of the teams which reached the quarter-finals of the 2013 World Cup were granted automatic qualification, along with co-hosts Papua New Guinea. The eighth quarter-finalist, the United States, were denied automatic qualification due to an internal governance dispute and instead forced to enter the qualification process.

== Qualified teams ==
Region	Team	Qualification method	Previous appearances	Previous best result
Americas	United States	Americas winner	1	Quarter-finals (2013)
Asia-Pacific	Australia	Hosts	14	Champions (1957, 1968, 1970, 1975, 1977, 1985–88, 1989–92, 1995, 2000, 2013)
Asia-Pacific	Fiji	Automatic	4	Semi-finals (2008, 2013)
Asia-Pacific	New Zealand	Hosts	14	Champions (2008)
Asia-Pacific	Papua New Guinea	Hosts	6	Quarter-finals (2000)
Asia-Pacific	Samoa	Automatic	4	Quarter-finals (2000, 2013)
Asia-Pacific	Tonga	Asia-Pacific play-off	4	Group stages (1995, 2000, 2008, 2013)
Europe	England (Note: Competed as part of Great Britain in nine previous tournaments, finishing as champions on three occasions (1954, 1960, 1972). The squads largely consisted of English players, but also featured Welsh players in every tournament. Scotland (1954, 1968, 1977, 1989–92) and Ireland (1957) were represented by native-born players in some tournaments.)	Automatic	5	Runners-up (1975, 1995)
Europe	France	Automatic	14	Runners-up (1954, 1968)
Europe	Ireland	Europe play-off 1	3	Quarter-finals (2000, 2008)
Europe	Italy	Europe repechage	1	Group stages (2013)
Europe	Scotland	Automatic	3	Quarter-finals (2013)
Europe	Wales	Europe play-off 2	4	Semi-finals (1995, 2000)
Middle East-Africa	Lebanon	Middle East-Africa play-off	1	Group stages (2000)

== Americas ==
One team qualified from this region. A three-team round robin tournament was held in Florida in December 2015 to determine the qualifier.

Team	Pld	W	D	L	PF	PA	PD	Pts
United States	2	2	0	0	54	38	+16	4
Jamaica	2	0	1	1	32	38	−6	1
Canada	2	0	1	1	42	52	−10	1

4 December 2015	United States	20–14	Jamaica	Hodges Stadium, Jacksonville, Florida
8 December 2015	Canada	18–18	Jamaica	Spec Martin Stadium, DeLand, Florida
12 December 2015	United States	34–24	Canada	Hodges Stadium, Jacksonville, Florida

== Asia-Pacific ==
Two additional qualifying places were initially allocated to this region. Papua New Guinea were granted automatic qualification in 2015 after being confirmed as co-hosts, leaving one additional team to qualify from this region. A single play-off between Tonga and Cook Islands determined the final qualifier.

17 October 2015

Tonga	28 – 8	Cook Islands
Try: Taufua 13' c Fonua 34' c Kata (2) 63', 68' c Terepo 74' c Goal: Kata (4/5) 14', 35', 69', 75'	Report	Try: Nicoll-Klokstad 4'; Gelling 23' Goal: Rapana (0/2)

Campbelltown Stadium, Campbelltown
Attendance: 4,813
Referee: (Australia) Gerard Sutton
Player of the Match: Solomone Kata (Tonga)

== Europe ==
Three additional teams qualified from this region. A two-group, round-robin tournament took place in October 2016 to determine the qualifying nations - this was contested by the winners of the 2015 European Championship C tournament, the top three teams from the 2014–15 European Championship B tournament, and seeded nations Wales and Ireland.

=== First round ===
Pos	Team	Pld	W	D	L	PF	PA	PD	Pts	Qualification
1	Serbia	6	5	0	1	196	73	+123	10	Advance to 2017 World Cup European qualification tournament
2	Russia	6	4	0	2	137	92	+45	8	Advance to 2017 World Cup European qualification tournament
3	Italy	6	3	0	3	142	134	+8	6	Advance to 2017 World Cup European qualification tournament
4	Ukraine	6	0	0	6	80	256	−176	0	

17 May 2014

Serbia	40–14	Ukraine
Tries Stevanovic, Djurkovic (3), Tulic, Calic, Zogovic, Nedeljkovic; Goals: Vukanovic 4/6	Report	Tries: Miroshnichenko, Pozhidaev, Troyan; Goals: Skorbach 1/3

Zeleznicar Stadium, Nis

24 May 2014

Russia	24–18	Ukraine
Tries: Bratko, Ovchinnikov, Vlasyuk, Zdobnikov, Kosharin; Goals: Zdobnikov 1/2, Bratko 1/1	Report	Tries: Skorbach (3); Goals: Skorbach 3/3

Vereya Stadium, Vereya

21 June 2014

Russia	20–6	Serbia
Tries: Kosharin (2), Nisiforov, Bratko; Goals: Lysokon 2/4	Report	Tries: Vukanovic; Goals: Vukanovic 1/1

Nara Stadium, Narofominsk

5 July 2014

Italy	54–12	Ukraine
Tries: Dalla Regione (3), Idammou (2), Miranda (2), Ameglio, De Mayer, Pagani; Goals: Fontana 7/10	Report	Tries: I Karpenko, Troyan; Goals: Mazepa 2/2

Stadio Comunale, Gemona del Friuli

26 July 2014

Italy	22–18	Russia
Tries: De Meyer, Curione (2); Goals: Bradley 5/6	Report	Tries: Bratko, Izmailov, Botnarash; Goals: Lysokon 3/3

Stadio Comunale, Gemona del Friuli

10 September 2014

Serbia	45–6	Italy
Tries: Vukanovic (2), Novakovic, Calic, Djurkovic (2), Zogovic, Stevanovic; Goals: Vukanovic 4/4, Vojislav Dedic 2/4; Drop Goals: Novakovic	Report	Tries: Celerino; Goals: Fontana 1/1

Makis Stadium, Belgrade

16 May 2015

Serbia	20–15	Russia
Tries: Stevanovic (2), Dedic, Zogovic; Goals: Dedic 2/4	Report	Tries: Korolev, Ovchinnikov, Zdobnikov; Goals: Lysokin 1/2, Grigoryan 0/1; Drop Goals: Ovchnnikov

Makis Stadium, Belgrade

20 June 2015

Italy	14–21	Serbia
Tries: Boscolo, Lepori, Gazzoli; Goals: Fontana 1/3	Report	Tries: Djurković, Janković, Stevanović; Goals: Vojislav Dedić 4/5; Drop Goals: Vojislav Dedić 1/1

Stadio Comunale, Gemona del Friuli

4 July 2015

Ukraine	20–34	Russia
Tries: Troyan, Veprik (2), Skorbach; Goals: Skorbach 2/4	Report	Tries: Bratko (2), Korolev (2), Zabelin (2), Bulanov; Goals: Lysokon 2/3, Grigoryan 0/1, Bratko 1/3

Makiš Stadium, Belgrade^{1}

18 July 2015

Ukraine	12–40	Italy
Tries: Troyan, Karpenko; Goals: Skorbach (2/2)	Report	Tries: Bellotti (3), Illinca, Boscolo, Celerino, Decaro, Lepori; Goals: De Mayer 4/5

National University of Ukraine, Irpin

12 September 2015

Russia	26–6	Italy
Tries: Lysokon, Gaponov, Burlutskiy, Bratko, Botnarash; Goals: Lysokon (2/4), Bratko (1/1)	Report	Tries: Boscolo; Goals: Fontana (1/1)

Fily Stadium, Moscow

12 September 2015

Ukraine	4–64	Serbia
Tries: Shalaev; Goals: Bashevskii (0/1)	Report	Tries: Gak (2), Stevanovic (3), Calic, V. Dedic, Nedeljkovic (2), Madzarevic, Zogovic; Goals: Vukanovic (0/1), V. Dedic (10/11)

FC Locomotive Stadium, Chop

=== First round (cont.) ===
Pos	Team	Pld	W	D	L	PF	PA	PD	Pts	Qualification
1	Spain	2	2	0	0	116	34	+82	4	Advance to 2017 World Cup European qualification tournament
2	Malta	2	1	0	1	60	40	+20	2	
3	Greece	2	0	0	2	4	106	−102	0	

26 September 2015
18:00

Spain	40–30	Malta
Tries: Morro; Garcia (3); O'Doutres; Puerta; Pilkington; Goals: Garcia 6/7	Report	Tries: Blyton-Keep; Francois Hussain; Burke Zarb; Lynch; Goals: Blyton-Keep 5/5

Polideportivo Quatre Carreres, Valencia
Player of the Match: (Spain) Daniel Garcia

10 October 2015

Malta	30–0^{1}	Greece

Marsa

17 October 2015
16:30

Greece	4–76	Spain
Tries: Roussos 57'; Goals: Koutsimbogiorgos 0/1	Report	Tries: Puerta (2) 11', 47'; Lopez (2) 24', 64'; Lagunas (2) 33', 75'; Doutres 4'; Blanco 7'; Dulley 16'; Morro 18'; Mehamed González 27'; Thorp 61'; Perez-Fuster 68'; Bringuier 78'; Goals: Doutres 8/12; Ivan Mendez 1/1; Aitor Davila 1/1

Athens

=== Second round ===
The tournament featured two groups of three teams playing in a single round-robin format. The winners of each group qualified for the World Cup, while the runners-up faced each other in a play-off match on 5 November 2016 to determine the final spot. A seeded draw took place to determine the groups on 5 November 2015.

Group A

Pos	Team	Pld	W	D	L	PF	PA	PD	Pts	Qualification
1	Wales	2	2	0	0	70	14	+56	4	Qualification for 2017 Rugby League World Cup
2	Italy	2	1	0	1	76	34	+42	2	Advance to play-off
3	Serbia	2	0	0	2	14	112	−98	0	

15 October 2016	Wales	50–0	Serbia	Stebonheath Park, Llanelli
22 October 2016	Serbia	14–62	Italy	Makiš Stadium, Belgrade
29 October 2016	Italy	14–20	Wales	Stadio Brianteo, Monza

Group B

Pos	Team	Pld	W	D	L	PF	PA	PD	Pts	Qualification
1	Ireland	2	2	0	0	116	22	+94	4	Qualification for 2017 Rugby League World Cup
2	Russia	2	1	0	1	56	76	−20	2	Advance to play-off
3	Spain	2	0	0	2	12	86	−74	0	

15 October 2016	Russia	40–6	Spain	Fili Stadium, Moscow
22 October 2016	Spain	6–46	Ireland	Polideportivo Quatre Carrares, Valencia
29 October 2016	Ireland	70–16	Russia	Carlisle Grounds, Bray

Playoff

4 November 2016
20:00 GMT (UTC+0:00)

Italy	76–0	Russia
Tries: Castellaro (2), Cerruto (2), Lepori (2), Wilkie (2), Campese, Celerino, Centrone, Santi, Wakeman, Walker; Goals: Campese (10/14)	Report (RLIF)

Leigh Sports Village, Leigh
Attendance: 450
Referee: Chris Campbell (England)
Player of the Match: Terry Campese (Italy)

== Middle East-Africa ==
One team qualified from this region. A two match series was held between South Africa and Lebanon to determine the qualifier.

25 October 2015	South Africa	12–40	Lebanon	Bosman Stadium, Brakpan
31 October 2015	South Africa	16–50	Lebanon	Bosman Stadium, Brakpan
