= Milan Kosanović =

Serbian Yugoslav rugby league footballer

Personal information
- Full name: Milan Kosanović
- Born: 1932; Lika, Yugoslavia (now Croatia)
- Died: 1989 (aged 56–57)

Playing information
- Height: 5 ft 10 in (1.78 m)
- Weight: 14 st 3 lb (90 kg)
- Position: Hooker
Club
Years	Team	Pld	T	G	FG	P
1955–61	Bradford Northern	143
1961–64	Wakefield Trinity	70	6	0	0	18
1964–67	Featherstone Rovers	93+1	1	0	0	3
	Total	307	7	0	0	21
Representative
Years	Team	Pld	T	G	FG	P
1958	English League XIII	1
1959	Yorkshire	2	1	0	0	3

Milan Kosanović (1932 – 1989), also known by the nickname of "Milo", was a Yugoslav Serb professional rugby league footballer who played in the 1950s and 1960s. He played at representative level for English League XIII and Yorkshire, and at club level for Bradford Northern, Wakefield Trinity and Featherstone Rovers, as a hooker.

== Background ==
Milan Kosanović was a Yugoslav Serb born in Lika, in what is now Croatia. His family relocated from Yugoslavia to the United Kingdom in 1947, where he initially played rugby league in the Halifax junior league, Milan Kosanović opened, and was the landlord, of Milan's Wine Bar in Halifax.

== Playing career ==
=== International honours ===
Milan Kosanović played hooker for English League XIII while at Bradford Northern in the 8-26 defeat by France on Saturday 22 November 1958 at Knowsley Road, St. Helens, and was a reserve hooker for Great Britain.

=== County honours ===
Milan Kosanović was selected for Yorkshire County XIII whilst at Bradford Northern during 1959.

=== Challenge Cup Final appearances ===
Milan Kosanović played hooker in Wakefield Trinity's 25-10 victory over Wigan in the 1962–63 Challenge Cup Final during the 1962–63 season at Wembley Stadium, London on Saturday 11 May 1963, in front of a crowd of 84,492, and was an unused substitute in Featherstone Rovers' 17-12 victory over Barrow in the 1966–67 Challenge Cup Final during the 1966–67 season at Wembley Stadium, London on Saturday 13 May 1967, in front of a crowd of 76,290.

=== County Cup Final appearances ===
Milan Kosanović played hooker in Wakefield Trinity's 19–9 victory over Leeds in the 1961–62 Yorkshire Cup Final during the 1961–62 season at Odsal Stadium, Bradford on Saturday 11 November 1961, and played hooker in Featherstone Rovers' 12-25 defeat by Hull Kingston Rovers in the 1966–67 Yorkshire Cup Final during the 1966–67 season at Headingley, Leeds on Saturday 15 October 1966.

=== Club career ===
Milan Kosanović transferred from Bradford Northern to Wakefield Trinity during June 1961, and he made his début for Wakefield Trinity during August 1961, he transferred from Wakefield Trinity to Featherstone Rovers for £600 during February 1964 (based on inflation, this would be equivalent to £15,358 in 2023), and he made his début for Featherstone Rovers on Saturday 1 February 1964.

== Contemporaneous Article Extract ==
"M. Kosanović - Signed from Bradford N. during last close season and has been a regular member of the side this campaign. Recently out of action through injury. Represented Yorkshire in 1959. Yugoslav-born but has played all his football in Yorkshire. Age 29."

== Death and legacy ==
Kosanovic died in 1989.

The Milan Kosanovic Cup is an international rugby league football competition that is named after Milan Kosanović, and is contested by Russia, Ukraine and Serbia.
