= 2022 Balkan Super League season =

Balkan Super League 2022
- League: Balkan Super League
- Duration: Knockout
- Teams: 11
- Champions: (Serbia) Red Star Belgrade

The 2022 Balkan Super League (BSL) season was the 6th season of the premier rugby league competition on the Balkans Region of Europe. The competition operates in addition to the national leagues of the respective nations as a Champions League-style competition. In this season clubs from Serbia, Turkey, Bulgaria, Bosnia and Herzegovina and Montenegro have competed.

== Format ==
The format featured an incomplete round robin followed by a Grand Final.

== 2022 Clubs ==
Team	Country	Domestic League
(Montenegro) Arsenal Tivat	Montenegro	Montenegro Rugby League (No league)
(Serbia) Dorcol Belgrade RLFC	Serbia	Serbian Rugby League Championship
(Bulgaria) Lokomotiv Sofia RLFC	Bulgaria	Bulgarian Rugby League Federation (No league)
(Serbia) Partizan Belgrade RLFC	Serbia	Serbian Rugby League Championship
(Serbia) Red Star Belgrade RLFC	Serbia	Serbian Rugby League Championship

== Regular season ==
=== Round 1 ===
Date	Time	Home	Score	Away
2022-04-10	20:16	(Montenegro) Arsenal Tivat	32–18	(Serbia) Dorćol Tigers
2022-04-02	14:00	(Bulgaria) Locomotive	10–64	(Serbia) Partizan 1953

=== Round 2 ===
Date	Time	Home	Score	Away
2022-04-17	15:00	(Serbia) Partizan 1953	12–26	(Serbia) Red Star
2022-04-16	14:00	(Bulgaria) Locomotive	18–34	(Montenegro) Arsenal Tivat

Note: Arsenal Tivat withdrew after Round 2

=== Round 3 ===
Date	Time	Home	Score	Away
2022-05-08	15:00	(Bulgaria) Locomotive	6–82	(Serbia) Red Star
2022-05-07	14:00	(Serbia) Dorćol Tigers	14–12	(Serbia) Partizan 1953

=== Round 4 ===
Date	Time	Home	Score	Away
2022-05-22	18:00	(Serbia) Dorćol Tigers	10–40	(Serbia) Red Star

=== Ladder ===
Team	Pld	W	D	L	PD	Pts
(Serbia) Red Star	3	3	0	0	+120	6
(Serbia) Partizan 1953	3	1	0	2	+38	2
~~(Montenegro) Arsenal Tivat~~	~~2~~	~~2~~	~~0~~	~~0~~	~~+30~~	~~4~~
(Serbia) Dorćol Tigers	3	1	0	2	-42	2
(Bulgaria) Locomotive	3	0	0	3	-146	0

Partizan won the tiebreaker over Dorćol by virtue of a better differential.

== Grand Final ==
Date	Time	Home	Score	Away
2022-06-26	17:30	(Serbia) Red Star	24–18	(Serbia) Partizan 1953
