= Milan Kosanovic Cup =

2011 international rugby league contest

- Current season or competition: 2011 Milan Kosanovic Cup
- Sport: Rugby league
- Instituted: 2011
- Number of teams: 3
- Region: International (RLEF)

The Milan Kosanovic Cup is an international rugby league football competition played between the Russia Bears, Ukraine and Serbia. The inaugural match was played in Ukraine.

The cup is named after Milan Kosanović, the first Serb to play Rugby League at Wembley Stadium.

== Results ==
Year	1st	2nd	3rd	Ref.
2011	Russia	Serbia	Ukraine	
