= 2014–15 Rugby League European Championship B =

2014–15 European Championship B
- Number of teams: 4
- Winner: Serbia (2nd title)
- Matches played: 12

The 2014–15 European Championship B tournament was the eighth staging of the Rugby League European Shield tournament played in the respective European countries participating over 2014 and 2015.

Germany were replaced in the tournament by Ukraine. Ukraine was joined by Russia, Serbia and Italy to contest the tournament. The tournament formed part of the 2017 Rugby League World Cup qualifying process, as the top three teams from the European B competition advanced to the final round-robin stage.

== Standings ==
Serbia, Russia and Italy have all qualified for the next stage of the 2017 Rugby League World Cup qualifying.

Team	Pld	W	D	L	PF	PA	+/−	Pts
Serbia	6	5	0	1	196	73	+123	10
Russia	6	4	0	2	137	31	+106	8
Italy	6	3	0	3	142	54	+88	6
Ukraine	6	0	0	6	80	256	–176	0

== Fixtures ==
17 May 2014

Serbia	40–14	Ukraine
Tries Stevanovic, Djurkovic (3), Tulic, Calic, Zogovic, Nedeljkovic; Goals: Vukanovic 4/6	Report	Tries: Miroshnichenko, Pozhidaev, Troyan; Goals: Skorbach 1/3

Zeleznicar Stadium, Nis

24 May 2014

Russia	24–18	Ukraine
Tries: Bratko, Ovchinnikov, Vlasyuk, Zdobnikov, Kosharin; Goals: Zdobnikov 1/2, Bratko 1/1	Report	Tries: Skorbach (3); Goals: Skorbach 3/3

Vereya Stadium, Vereya

21 June 2014

Russia	20–6	Serbia
Tries: Kosharin (2), Nisiforov, Bratko; Goals: Lysokon 2/4	Report	Tries: Vukanovic; Goals: Vukanovic 1/1

Nara Stadium, Narofominsk

5 July 2014

Italy	54–12	Ukraine
Tries: Dalla Regione (3), Idammou (2), Miranda (2), Ameglio, De Mayer, Pagani; Goals: Fontana 7/10	Report	Tries: I Karpenko, Troyan; Goals: Mazepa 2/2

Stadio Comunale, Gemona del Friuli

26 July 2014

Italy	22–18	Russia
Tries: De Meyer, Curione (2); Goals: Bradley 5/6	Report	Tries: Bratko, Izmailov, Botnarash; Goals: Lysokon 3/3

Stadio Comunale, Gemona del Friuli

10 September 2014

Serbia	45–6	Italy
Tries: Vukanovic (2), Novakovic, Calic, Djurkovic (2), Zogovic, Stevanovic; Goals: Vukanovic 4/4, Vojislav Dedic 2/4; Drop Goals: Novakovic	Report	Tries: Celerino; Goals: Fontana 1/1

Makis Stadium, Belgrade

16 May 2015

Serbia	20–15	Russia
Tries: Stevanovic (2), Dedic, Zogovic; Goals: Dedic 2/4	Report	Tries: Korolev, Ovchinnikov, Zdobnikov; Goals: Lysokin 1/2, Grigoryan 0/1; Drop Goals: Ovchnnikov

Makis Stadium, Belgrade

20 June 2015

Italy	14–21	Serbia
Tries: Boscolo, Lepori, Gazzoli; Goals: Fontana 1/3	Report	Tries: Djurković, Janković, Stevanović; Goals: Vojislav Dedić 4/5; Drop Goals: Vojislav Dedić 1/1

Stadio Comunale, Gemona del Friuli

4 July 2015

Ukraine	20–34	Russia
Tries: Troyan, Veprik (2), Skorbach; Goals: Skorbach 2/4	Report	Tries: Bratko (2), Korolev (2), Zabelin (2), Bulanov; Goals: Lysokon 2/3, Grigoryan 0/1, Bratko 1/3

Makiš Stadium, Belgrade^{1}

18 July 2015

Ukraine	12–40	Italy
Tries: Troyan, Karpenko; Goals: Skorbach (2/2)	Report	Tries: Bellotti (3), Illinca, Boscolo, Celerino, Decaro, Lepori; Goals: De Mayer 4/5

National University of Ukraine, Irpin

12 September 2015

Russia	26–6	Italy
Tries: Lysokon, Gaponov, Burlutskiy, Bratko, Botnarash; Goals: Lysokon (2/4), Bratko (1/1)	Report	Tries: Boscolo; Goals: Fontana (1/1)

Fily Stadium, Moscow

12 September 2015

Ukraine	4–64	Serbia
Tries: Shalaev; Goals: Bashevskii (0/1)	Report	Tries: Gak (2), Stevanovic (3), Calic, V. Dedic, Nedeljkovic (2), Madzarevic, Zogovic; Goals: Vukanovic (0/1), V. Dedic (10/11)

FC Locomotive Stadium, Chop

Notes

1. Match moved to neutral territory due to travel restrictions following the 2014–15 Russian military intervention in Ukraine
