= Rugby league in Serbia =

- Country: Serbia
- Governing body: Rugby League European Federation
- National team: Serbia
- First played: 1 November 1953
- Registered players: 1,500 - 2,000
- Clubs: 17

Club competitions
- Serbian Rugby League Championship; Serbian Rugby League Cup

Audience records
- Single match: 5,000

Rugby league is a team sport that is played in Serbia, which now has almost 1000 registered players nationwide, many of which are juniors. Belgrade and Novi Sad are the two main bases for the sport, producing most of the country's players. The most successful Serbian club side are the Dorćol Spiders who have won the most premierships. The other club Red Star Belgrade who defeated Dorćol in the deciding game to claim the minor premiership.

== History ==
Rugby league was introduced into Serbia in 1953, by then secretary of the Yugoslavian Sport Association, Dragan Maršićević. The first rugby league match in Serbia was held in Belgrade on November 26, 1953, between French students and Selection Provence. The game was part of an attempt by the French Rugby XIII Federation to stimulate interest in the sport in Serbia.

The first rugby league club formed in Serbia was Partizan, on November 1, 1953, followed a couple of months later by Radnički. The two teams played their first match on April 26, 1954, with Partizan winning 21-11. In 1961, the Yugoslav national team played their first and only match against a French amateur XIII, with the team going down 13-0.

While rugby league was played in Serbia, Croatia played the rival code of rugby union and Yugoslav authorities demanded that Serbian clubs switch to rugby union to unite Yugoslavia under one form of rugby football in 1964.

Rugby league officially returned to Serbia in 2001, with the formation of the Serbian Rugby League Federation at meeting held in Kruševac. Journalist Slaviša Milenković was voted in as president of the new federation. The inaugural Serbian Rugby League Championship was held on November 10, featuring teams Donji Dorćol Belgrade, Morava Belgrade, Novi Sad and Beli Orao Kruševac. Belgrade's Dorćol team won the event.

Dorćol is champion for the 2002, 2003, 2004, 2005, 2006, 2007, 2008, 2009, 2010, 2011, 2012 years. In late 2015 the European Rugby League federation granted Serbia a donation from their funds which in turn helped in producing at least 4 more junior clubs and having a flow on effect in other Serbian regions.

In 2013, Serbia helped spread the sport to the Serbian enclave of Republika Srpska in Bosnia and Herzegovina, especially Banja Luka and Doboj.

In October 2016 Serbia has two remaining world cup qualifiers to contest against Wales in Llanelli and against Italy in Belgrade. The match against a prestigious opponent like Wales will be the most important game Serbia has played to date.

Major clubs in Serbia include Dorcol Spiders and Red Star Belgrade (Crvena Zvezda). Serbian club Red Star Belgrade will take part in the English Challenge Cup competition in 2019.

== The National Team ==
The National Team, which has represented Serbia, has competed in the Rugby League Mediterranean Cup in both 2003 and 2004 and had shown great improvement on the second occasion.

In 2005 they also participated in a three-way qualification tournament for the Rugby League European Nations Cup with the Holland and Georgia.

In 2006 Serbia participated in a four-way Rugby League World Cup qualifications/ENC B tournament with Russia, Georgia and Holland.

During July 2006, the Serbian U-19 national team participated in the U-19 European Nations Cup in Northern Catalonia. The Serbian boys were the only team outside Home nations or France on that tournament. However, they finished sixth by losing to Scotland only 14-16 in the last minutes of their 5th place play-off encounter in Barcares.

On August 12, 2006, Serbia won its first trophy. They won Czech Republic in Prague and their captain Radoslav Novaković lifted the Slavic Cup. The Serbian team played without Serbian origin players from UK or Australia.

On October 28, 2006, Serbia played Greece in Athens an historic match as it was the first Rugby League match on Greek soil. Greece was at an advantage in this match, as 10 out of their 17 players were Australian-based Greeks. Although Serbia lost the match 44-26, they played well against a team that included much more experienced players. The Serbian players said it was an honour to play against Salford City Reds player Michael Korkidas. However, this did not stop the Serbian players from being as physical as possible against Korkidas. This match was watched by 250 spectators in Athens. The low crowd was due to Greek Rugby Union trying to stop the game from being played, it was not advertised.

Belgrade hosted the first U16 European Nations Cup from 27 June to 3 July. Serbian boys made great upset by beating Russia 22-10 in the first match of their pool. In the second round, England (later winners of the Cup) won Serbia 46-0 and in 3rd place playoff Serbia lost to European Celts 22-20. However, the fourth place of Serbian U16s is the greatest success of national Rugby League in the history of the game in the country.

In 2007 Serbia is taking part in European Shield, newly established European Rugby League competition. The first match, v Germany in Heidelberg, Serbia won 38-6 (tries by Pešić, Radovanović, Vukanović, Matejić, Jerković and Milanko and goals by Vukanović 6 and Matejić). The second match, v Czech Republic in Belgrade, Serbia won 56-16 (tries by Pešić 2, Mijušković, Radovanović 2, Jerković 2, Matejić, Brkić and Marko Milosavljević and goals by Brkić 5 and Novaković), and won the three-way competition with perfect record. Winning the match v Czech national team, Serbians defended Slavic Cup.

2008 saw the Serbia national team challenged in both the U18 and open age competitions. U18s won 6th place in European Nations Cup (European Nations Shield runners-up) held in Prague and Beroun after losing to Ireland 12-66 in preliminaries, defeating European Celts 38-32 in Shield semifinals and losing to Scotland 42-38 after golden point in the second extra-time of the Shield final. As failed to qualify to 2008 Rugby League World Cup, Serbia national team took part in Euro-Med Challenge during end of September and first week of October and finished third due to defeats to Russia (4-30 in Novi Sad) and Lebanon (14-20 in Bhamdoun).

In February 2016 Serbia toured Australia. were they participated in the Cabramatta 9s and played a full sanctioned test match against the Philippines losing 18-12, the Serbia squad consisted of 8 home grown players and the rest where Australian born lads of Serbian heritage, Serbia had a late try disallowed while the Philippines had a strong squad of mostly Australian born players. The tour and especially the test match where historical moments for Serbian Rugby League. On the 27th of June 2016 Serbia played the England Lion-hearts a select group of players from Yorkshire the stronghold of English Rugby League. Serbia lost 14-16 a very courageous and proud effort from the Serbian team against a prestigious opponent, the venue was the Radnicki stadium in Belgrade, Serbia showed it is a Rugby League country in the making pushing the Lion-Hearts to the brink of defeat.

== Notable achievements ==
Serbia has wasted no time producing good Rugby League players. Impressive youngsters Dalibor Vukanović and Soni Radovanovic had stints with English National League Two side London Skolars in 2005, National League Three side Warrington Wizards and Russian 2nd runners-up Vereya in 2006. The boys were aged 19 and 17 respectively during their stint in England.

Tom Opacic of the Brisbane Broncos is one player of Serbian heritage playing in the strongest league in the world the NRL in Australia. Opacic will represent Serbia at the upcoming world cup qualifiers in October 2016, making him the first Serbia national team player ever selected from the NRL.

Other players of Serbian heritage in the NRL are two brothers Tom and Jake Trbojevic from the Manly Sea Eagles. They are two of the most talented youngsters in the NRL.

Zoran Pešić is arguably Serbia's best export so far. Zoran had a six-week stint with National League Three side Warrington Wizards with above-mentioned Vukanović and Radovanović. He was also one of three nominees for the award of Best Emerging Nations Player at the Rugby League International Federation awards in Sydney on November 20, 2006. This award was won by St George Illawarra Dragons' Wes Naiqama, who represented Fiji.

UK-born player of Serbian origin (and also Serbian RL international) Luka Simeunović lifted the English U-21 Senior Academy Cup as captain of the Halifax R.L.F.C. Academy team. He is one of the most successful Rugby League players with Serbian roots, alongside his older brother James, and he is a member of Halifax 27-men squad.

In March 2007, Serbian Rugby League national team have beaten the British Prison Service 44-24 and won Belgrade Trophy.

In 2007, some Serbian players have their sights set on breaking into the French Elite League, while others may be headed for Russia or England.

In 2014, Stefan Nedeljković and his fellow Serbian and Dorcol Spiders teammate Stevan Stevanović were selected to train with professional English Super League club, the Warrington Wolves. They travelled to Cheshire for some professional experience with a two-week training spell. Watch their training here=

In 2015, Stefan Nedeljković was offered a second trial with the Warrington Wolves and this time he made it clear that he wanted a professional contract with the club.

== See also ==
- Serbian Rugby League Cup
- Serbian Rugby League Championship
