= Bosnia and Herzegovina national rugby league team =

Bosnia and Herzegovina

Team information
- Governing body: Bosnia and Herzegovina Rugby League Association
- Region: Europe
- Head coach: Danijel Vrebac
- Home stadium: FK Krajina, Banja Luka and FK Vitez, Vitez
- IRL ranking: 47th

Team results
- First international
- unofficial Bosnia and Herzegovina 4 - 58 Greece (Dorćol, Serbia; 17 October 2014)
- Biggest win
- unofficial Hungary 6 - 32 Bosnia and Herzegovina (Belgrade, Serbia; 19 October 2014)
- Biggest defeat
- unofficial Bosnia and Herzegovina 4 - 58 Greece (Dorćol, Serbia; 17 October 2014)
- World Cup
- Appearances: 0

The Bosnia national rugby league team represents Bosnia and Herzegovina in the sport of rugby league football and have been participating in international competition since 2014.

== History ==
Bosnia participated in the Balkans Cup competition in 2014. But their matches weren't rated as official international matches as the national association has yet to apply for RLEF membership. They won their first "Unofficial" match against Hungary by 32-6 in the Third Place play off match of the 2014 Balkans Cup tournament.

In January 2018, the Bosnia and Herzegovina Rugby League Association was founded in Vitez. In May 2018, the Rugby League European Federation awarded it observer status.

== Competitive record ==
=== Overall ===
Below is table of the official representative rugby league matches played by Bosnia and Herzegovina at test level up until 6 June 2021:

Opponent	Played	Won	Drawn	Lost	Win %	For	Aga	Diff
Greece	1	0	0	1	0%	4	58	-54
Hungary	1	1	0	0	100%	32	6	+26
Serbia	1	0	0	1	0%	4	50	-46
Total	3	1	0	2	33%	40	114	-74

=== Balkans Cup ===
Balkans Cup record
Year	Round	Position	GP	W	L	D
(Serbia) 2014	Third place	3/4	2	1	1	0
(Serbia) 2017	Not invited					
Total	0 Titles	1/2	2	1	1	0

=== Results ===
Date	Result	Opponent	Competition	Venue	Ref.
17 October 2014	4–58	Greece	2014 Balkans Cup	Makiš Stadium, Belgrade, Serbia	
19 October 2014	32–6	Hungary	2014 Balkans Cup	Makiš Stadium, Belgrade, Serbia	
6 June 2021	4–50	Serbia	International Friendly	NK Rijeka Stadium Vitez, Bosnia and Herzegovina	

== IRL Rankings ==
IRL Men's World Rankings
Official rankings as of December 2025
Rank	Change	Team	Pts %
1	Steady	Australia	100
2	Steady	New Zealand	82
3	Steady	England	74
4	Steady	Samoa	56
5	Steady	Tonga	54
6	Steady	Papua New Guinea	47
7	Steady	Fiji	34
8	Steady	France	24
9	Steady	Cook Islands	24
10	Steady	Serbia	23
11	Steady	Netherlands	22
12	Steady	Ukraine	21
13	Steady	Wales	18
14	Steady	Ireland	17
15	Steady	Greece	15
16	Steady	Malta	15
17	Steady	Italy	11
18	Steady	Jamaica	9
19	▲1	Poland	7
20	▲1	Lebanon	7
21	▲1	Norway	7
22	▼3	United States	7
23	Steady	Germany	7
24	Steady	Czech Republic	6
25	Steady	Chile	6
26	▲1	Philippines	5
27	▲1	Scotland	5
28	▼2	South Africa	5
29	▲1	Canada	5
30	▼1	Brazil	3
31	▲1	Morocco	3
32	▲1	North Macedonia	3
33	▲1	Argentina	3
34	▲1	Montenegro	3
35	▲4	Ghana	2
36	▼5	Kenya	2
37	▲3	Nigeria	2
38	▼2	Albania	1
39	▼2	Turkey	1
40	▼2	Bulgaria	1
41	▲1	Cameroon	0
42	▲1	Japan	0
43	▲1	Spain	0
44	▼3	Colombia	0
45	Steady	Russia	0
46	Steady	El Salvador	0
47	Steady	Bosnia and Herzegovina	0
48	Steady	Hong Kong	0
49	Steady	Solomon Islands	0
50	Steady	Vanuatu	0
51	Steady	Hungary	0
52	Steady	Latvia	0
53	Steady	Denmark	0
54	Steady	Belgium	0
55	Steady	Estonia	0
56	Steady	Sweden	0
57	Steady	Niue	0
Complete rankings at www.internationalrugbyleague.com
