= 2011 Milan Kosanovic Cup =

- Number of teams: 3
- Matches played: 3

The 2011 Milan Kosanovic Cup was an international rugby league tournament played in Eastern Europe The competing teams were the Russia, Ukraine and Serbia.

The 2011 tournament was the inaugural staging of the Milan Kosanovic Cup. Russia took the trophy by winning both their matches. The match between Serbia and Russia was also a European qualification match for the 2013 World Cup.

== Squads ==
=== Russia ===
Players
Maksim Suchkov, Rustam Bulanov, Mikhail Burlutskiy, Roman Safronov, Aleksander Lysokon, Eduard Ososkov, Sergey Konstantinov, Vladimir Vlasyuk, Anatoly Grigorjev, Aleksey Nikolaev, Ilgiz Galimov, Artyom Grigoryan, Aleksey Volkov, Vladimir Gutsulyak, Grigory Esin, Igor Chuprin, Andrey Sevostjanov

=== Ukraine ===
Players
Vladimir Mashkin, Igor Shevtsov, Sergey Romanko, Aleksander Skorbach, Dmitriy Semerenko, Vladimir Lobanj, Nikolay Getmanov, Maksim Miroshnichenko, Yury Smoliy, Mikhail Troyan, Sergey Kravchenko, Aleksander Kozak, Pavel Kardakov, Sergey Shevtsov, Artur Martyrosyan, Vadim Tolstoj

=== Serbia ===
Players
Ivan Šušnjara, Radovan Tajsić, Nikša Unković, Stevan Stevanović, Mirko Božović, Adam Nedić, Milan Šušnjara, Dejan Lukenić, Zoran Pešić, Vuk Tvrdišić, Stefan Nedeljković, Miloš Ćalić, Stefan Nikolić. Subs: Nenad Radević, Danilo Delić, Slaviša Zekić, Nebojša Živanović

== Table ==
Pos	Team	Pld	W	D	L	PF	PA	PD	Pts
1	Russia	2	2	0	0	72	32	+40	4
2	Serbia	2	1	0	1	38	40	−2	2
3	Ukraine	2	0	0	2	8	46	−38	0

== Results ==
=== Ukraine vs Russia ===
Saturday, 10 September

Ukraine	4-36	Russia
Tries: Kozak; Goals:	Report	Tries: Lysokon (3), Ososkov, Chuprin, Vlasyuk; Goals: Lysokon (6)

Dinamo Stadium, Kharkiv, Ukraine
Attendance: 1,624

=== Serbia vs Ukraine ===
Friday 30 September
20:00

Serbia	10 - 4	Ukraine
Tries: Unković, Nedić; Goals: Nedić	Report	Tries: Kardakov; Goals:

Ada Ciganlija, Belgrade, Serbia
Attendance: 350

=== Serbia vs Russia ===
29 October
12:00

Serbia	28 - 36	Russia
Tries: Goals:	Report	Tries: Goals:

MUP Serbia Sports Centre Makiš, Belgrade
