= Phil Economidis =

Australian rugby league coach

Personal information
- Full name: Philip Economidis
- Born: 9 February 1953 (age 73) Biloela, Queensland, Australia

Coaching information
Club
Years	Team	Gms	W	D	L	W%
1996–98	Gold Coast Chargers	69	20	2	49	29
2018–	Red Star Rugby League Club	36	26	1	9	72
	Total	105	46	3	58	44
- As of 23 April 2021

Phil Economidis is an Australian Rugby league coach currently coaching Red Star Rugby League Club in the Serbian Rugby League. He is also known as the former coach of the now defunct Gold Coast Chargers in the old Australian Rugby League.

== Coaching career ==
Economidis guided the Gold Coast to finals glory in 1997, they beat the Illawarra Steelers 25–14 in front of just 8,197 dedicated fans at Parramatta Stadium, believed to be the lowest ever finals series attendance for the ARL/NRL.

Economidis also assisted in "Coach Talk", inside the sixth edition of Shamrock's Rugby League book.

Throughout his ARL career with the Gold Coast Chargers, he guided the club to 20 victories from 69 starts, a percentage of 29%, the highest of any Gold Coast coach pre Gold Coast Titans.
