= Georgia Rugby League =

Rugby group of Europe

- Founded: 2004
- Responsibility: Georgia

(Georgia (country))

The Georgia Rugby League is the governing body for the sport of rugby league football in GeorgiaIt was formed in 2004.

== See also ==
- Rugby league in Georgia
- Georgia national rugby league team
