= 2012–13 European Shield =

- Duration: 6 Rounds
- Number of teams: 4
- Winners: Russia
- Runners-up: Italy

In 2012, the European Shield switched to a new 2 year format with teams playing each other at home and away. The teams involved were the 2010 East and West Champions (Russia and Serbia) who competed along with the 2011 Champions (Germany). They were joined by the 2013 World Cup qualifier (Italy). The competition was won by Russia who won four of the five matches they played before their final match was awarded to them when their opponents, Germany, forfeited due to a number of players failing to arrange travel visas in time. Italy won all of their 2013 fixtures to take second place ahead of Serbia.

== Results ==
2012-05-12

Germany	25-24	Serbia
Tries: Koch (18), Marin (27, 63), Danzey (43), Isaak (55); Goals: K. Keinhorst 2/5; Drop Goal: K. Keinhorst	(Report)	Tries: Stevanović (33, 49), S. Nikolić (59), Ćalić (65); Goals: Zogović 4/4

Fritz-Grunebaum-Sportpark, Heidelberg

2012-05-19

Germany	26-32	Russia
Tries: J. Keinhorst (37, 47, 71), Amefia (65), Danzey (68); Goals: J. Keinhorst 2/4, Danzey 1/1	(Report)	Tries: Bulanov (9, 30), Chuprin (18, 21, 56), Volkov (53); Goals: Lysokon 4/6

Fritz-Grunebaum-Sportpark, Heidelberg

2012-06-09

Serbia	24-18	Italy
Tries: Unković (21), Nedeljković (43), Živanović (52), Delić (65), Božović (69); Goals: Vukanović 2/5; Drop Goals: Vukanović 0/1	(Report)	Tries: Lenarduzzi (18), Barani (28), Cardella (47); Goals: Fontana 2/2, Peens 1/1

Makiš stadium, Belgrade
Attendance: 600

2012-07-07

Italy	72-10	Germany
Tries: Rancati (1), Barani (5), Marchesi (19), Fontana (24,29), De Mayer (27), Peens (39), Cardella (42), Prizzon (57), Alfonsi (62), Muyodi (67), Ciaurro (76); Goals: Peens 10/10, Fontana 2/2	(Report)	Tries: N. Keinhorst (18), Lortz (70); Goals: McLean 1/2

Stadio Beltrametti, Piacenza

2012-08-08

Russia	32-18	Italy
Tries: Gaponov (36), Botnarash (55, 72), Ososkov (58, 60), Mikhailov (69); Goals: Lysokon 4/6	(Report)	Tries: Ciaurro (11, 30), Esposito (47); Goals: Peens 3/3

Nara Stadium, Naro-Fominsk

2012-09-22

Russia	21-20	Serbia
Tries: Botnarash (20), Gaponov (32), Chuprin (52), Bratko (66); Goals: Lysokon 2/4; Drop Goal: Ososkov	(Report)	Tries: Stevanovic (12, 46), Bozovic (57), Bozic (69); Goals: Vukanovic 2/5

Nara Stadium, Naro-Fominsk

2013-05-18

Serbia	46-10	Germany
Tries: Nedeljković (5, 29, 49), Vojislav Dedić (18), Stevanović (60, 77), Tajsić (69), Ćalić (72); Goals: Zogović 7/9	(Report)	Tries: Moate (12), Amefia (34); Goals: K. Keinhorst 1/5

Makiš Stadium, Belgrade

2013-05-25

Serbia	10-24	Russia
Tries: Zogović (39), Stevanović (65); Goals: Zogović 1/2	(Report)	Tries: Konstantinov (21, 47), Lysokon (55, 74); Goals: Ososkov 3/3, Lysokon 1/1

Makiš Stadium, Belgrade

2013-06-29

Italy	38-18	Russia
Tries: Fontana (4), Ilinca (9), Saltonstall (20), Celerino (25), Vitalini (29), De Meyer (33), Nasso (63); Goals: Fontana 2, Peens 3	(Report)	Tries: Ososkov (46), Grigorev (56), Lysokon (69); Goals: Lysokon 3

Stadio Augusteo, Este

2013-07-27

Germany	30-66	Italy
Tries: Hoggins (4), Fehlemann (23), Keinhorst (42), Lortz (62), Améfia (72,79); Goals: Keinhorst 3/6	(Report)	Tries: Franchi (8, 36), Miranda (12), Celerino (18), Lepori (20, 39, 66), Barani (28), Pavoni (45), Bradley (51), Saltonstall (69), Ciaurro (75); Goals: Peens 3/3, Bradley 6/9

Nordstern Stadion, Karlsruhe

2013-08-10

Russia	30-0	Germany
	(Report)

Nara Stadium, Naro-Fominsk

2013-09-14

Italy	32-20	Serbia
Tries: Calegari (6, 39), Celerino (24), Peens (45), Boscolo (58), Lepori (61); Goals: Fontana 1/2, Peens 3/4	(Report)	Tries: Cuk (19, 78), Stevanović (36,48); Goals: Vojislav Dedić 2/3, Vukanovic 0/1

Stadio Augusteo, Este

== Standings ==
Pos	Team	Pld	W	D	L	PF	PA	PD	Pts
1	Russia	6	5	0	1	157	112	+45	10
2	Italy	6	4	0	2	244	134	+110	8
3	Serbia	6	2	0	4	144	130	+14	4
4	Germany	6	1	0	5	101	270	−169	2
