= Dorćol Spiders =

Serbian rugby league club

Club information
- Full name: Rugby Club Dorćol
- Nickname: Dorćol Spiders
- Colours
- Founded: 1998; 28 years ago
- Website: https://dorcol.org.rs

Current details
- Competition: Serbian Rugby League

Records
- Championship: 14
- Serbian Cup: 12

Dorćol Spiders Rugby League Club (Serbian: Ragbi Klub Dorćol /Рагби Клуб Дорћол) is a Serbian rugby league club based in Belgrade and competing in the Serbian Rugby League.

== History ==
Rugby club Dorćol is the oldest rugby league club in the modern history of this game in Serbia. It was founded on May 24, 1998, in the local Romansa tavern on Dorćol in Dobračina Street. The founding assembly was attended by 23 members, who unanimously elected Dragan Pavlović as the first president.

It was founded as a rugby union club and was a member of the Rugby Union of Serbia until 2007. In 2004 it merged with the Donji Dorćol Rugby Club which had been established in 2000 as one of the founding clubs of the Serbian Rugby League.

== Honours ==
- Serbian Rugby League Championship
  - Winners (14): 2002, 2003, 2004, 2005, 2006, 2007, 2008, 2009, 2010, 2011, 2012, 2014, 2015, 2016
- Serbian Rugby League Cup
  - Winners (12): 2001, 2002, 2003, 2008, 2009, 2010, 2011, 2012, 2013, 2014, 2015, 2024
- Serbian Supercup
  - Winners (2): 2014,2017
