= 2017 Balkans Cup (rugby league) =

- Number of teams: 3
- Host country: Serbia
- Winner: Serbia (1st title)
- Matches played: 3
- Points scored: 202 (67.33 per match)
- Tries scored: 36 (12 per match)

The 2017 Balkans Cup was a rugby league football tournament that was held in Serbia between October 6 and October 10, 2017.

Three teams competed in the 2017 event. These teams were: Serbia, Greece and Bulgaria.

After a series of round robin matches, Serbia were crowned champions for the first time in their history.

== Teams ==
Team	Coach	Captain	RLIF Rank
Serbia	(Serbia) Ljubomir Bukvić	(Serbia) Dragan Jankovic	14
Greece	(Australia) Steve Georgallis	(Greece) Stefanos Bastas	23
Bulgaria	(Bulgaria) Tihomir Simeonov	(Bulgaria) Tihomir Simeonov	41

== Stadiums ==
Stadium	Games	City	State	Capacity	Best Crowd
Makiš Stadium	1	Čukarica	Belgrade	4,000	150
Sportski Centar Rakovica	2	Rakovica	Belgrade		

== Fixtures ==
=== Round 1 ===
==== Greece vs Bulgaria ====
6 October 2017
21:30 (GMT+2)

Greece	68 – 8	Bulgaria
Tries: Aris Dardamanis (2); Giorgos Tsiakos (2); Alvaro Zota (2); Stefanos Bastas; Kostas Georgogalas; Konstantinos Katsidonis; Iasonas Lamprou; Ioannis Nake; Ioannis Rousoglou; Goals: Nikolaos Bosmos (9/11); Ioannis Nake (1/1)	Report; Report	Tries: Milen Nikolov (2); Goals: Milen Nikolov (0/2)

SC Rakovica, Belgrade
Attendance: 50
Referee: (Serbia) Radoslav Novakovic

=== Round 2 ===
==== Serbia vs Bulgaria ====
8 October 2017
13:00

Serbia	50 – 20	Bulgaria
Tries: Denis Bajrami (2); Dragan Janković (2); Tihomir Stamenković (2); Mihajlo Ilic; Mihajlo Jović; Aleksandar Palović; Goals: Stefan Vukanović (7/8); Branko Čarapić (0/1)	Report; Report	Tries: Antonio Lubenov (3); Martin Hristov; Goals: Veselin Pechev (2/4)

SC Rakovica, Belgrade

=== Round 3 ===
==== Serbia vs Greece ====
8 October 2017
15:30

Serbia	50 – 8	Greece
Tries: Rajko Trifunović (2); Miloš Zogović (2); Andrej Mora; Relja Petrović; Aleksa Radić; Djordje Stošić; Miloš Ćalić; Goals: Vojislav Dedić (5/7); Miloš Zogović (2/2)	Report; Report	Tries: Dimosthenis Kartsonakis; Goals: Nikolaos Bosmos (2/2)

Makis Stadium, Belgrade
Attendance: 150
Referee: (Serbia) Slavisa Zekic
