= Radoslav Novaković =

Serbia international rugby league footballer

Personal information
- Born: 7 August 1978 (age 47) Belgrade, Serbia, Yugoslavia

Playing information
- Position: Prop
Club
Years	Team	Pld	T	G	FG	P
2001–09	Dorćol
2010–	Stari Grad
	Total	0	0	0	0	0
Representative
Years	Team	Pld	T	G	FG	P
2003–08	Serbia	11	1	2	0	8

Coaching information
Representative
Years	Team	Gms	W	D	L	W%
2015	Serbia
2018	Serbia	1	0	0	1	0

Radoslav Novaković is a former Serbian rugby league player, playing at prop. He was the captain, and later caretaker head-coach - on two separate occasions, of the Serbia national rugby league team. After finishing the playing career, he remained within the sport as a referee and member of the Rugby league in Serbia managing board.
