= Spanish Campeonato Nacional Liga 2017–18 =

2017–18 Serie A
- Teams: 6
- Premiers: Tigres Torrent
- Minor premiers: TBD

The 2017–18 Spanish Campeonato Nacional Liga was the inaugural season of the Spanish Campeonato Nacional Liga, a rugby league competition held in Spain. It ran from November to April, with ten rounds followed by playoffs and a final.

== Teams ==
- Valencian Warriors
- Ontinyent
- Custodians Madrid
- Bufals XIII
- Xativa Roosters
- Torrent Tigers

== Results ==
LEGA MFB - Serie A Season 2017–18

Round 1

Bufals XIII 39-38 Xàtiva Roosters

Valencian Warriors 30-0 Custodians Madrid *

Rugby Ontinyent 4-80 Tigres Torrent

Round 2

Tigres Torrent 32-12 Valencian Warriors

Xàtiva Roosters 82-14 Rugby Ontinyent

Custodians Madrid * 0-30 Bufals XIII

Round 3

Bufals XIII 20-50 Tigres Torrent

Valencian Warriors 70-14 Rugby Ontinyent

Custodians Madrid 40-8 Xàtiva Roosters

Round 4

Tigres Torrent 30-0 Custodians Madrid *

Valencian Warriors 50-8 Xàtiva Roosters

Rugby Ontinyent 36-52 Bufals XIII

Round 5

Bufals XIII 28-60 Valencian Warriors

Xàtiva Roosters 14-52 Tigres Torrent

Custodians Madrid * 0-30 Rugby Ontinyent

Round 6

Xàtiva Roosters 42-36 Bufals XIII

Custodians Madrid * 0-30 Valencian Warriors

Tigres Torrent 80-10 Rugby Ontinyent

Round 7

Valencian Warriors 20-42 Tigres Torrent

Rugby Ontinyent 26-48 Xàtiva Roosters

Bufals XIII 30-0 Custodians Madrid *

Round 8

Tigres Torrent 50-0 Bufals XIII

Rugby Ontinyent 12-82 Valencian Warriors

Xativa Roosters 30-0 Custodians Madrid *

Round 9

Custodians Madrid * 0-30 Tigres Torrent

Xàtiva Roosters 28-18 Valencian Warriors

Bufals XIII 0-33 Rugby Ontinyent

Round 10

Valencian Warriors vs Bufals XIII

Tigres Torrent 48-16 Xàtiva Roosters

Rugby Ontinyent 30-0 Custodians Madrid *

== Ladder ==
Tigres Torrent - 30
Valencian Warriors - 18
Xativa Roosters - 16
Bufals XIII - 13
Rugby Ontinyent - 9
Atletico Custodians Madrid - 0
