= Spain national rugby league team =

Spain

Team information
- Governing body: Asociación Española de Rugby League
- Region: Europe
- Head coach: Mike Grady
- IRL ranking: 43rd

Uniforms
First colours

Team results
- First international
- Spain 12–10 Belgium (Brussels, 25 May 2014)
- Biggest win
- Greece 4–76 Spain (Athens, 17 October 2015)
- Biggest defeat
- Italy 94–4 Spain (Saluzzo, 10 June 2017)

The Spain national rugby league team represents Spain in the sport of rugby league football, running under the auspices of the Asociación Española de Rugby League.

== History ==
The first international rugby league in Spain was played in the region of Catalonia in 2009, with a Catalonia national rugby league team playing several matches against European nations. However, desiring to represent only Catalonia and not the entirety of Spain, the Catalonia team was denied RLEF membership and disappeared from international competition shortly afterwards.

Rugby league in Spain began once again in 2013, with a national body (Asociación Española de Rugby League) being formed and admitted to the RLEF by the end of that year. The first Spanish domestic competition kicked off in 2013 with clubs based in the Valencian Community, and the national team played its first match on May 25, 2014, defeating Belgium in Brussels. The first captain was Aitor Davila and the first Spanish try at international level was scored by Gonzalo Morro.

=== 2017 Rugby League World Cup ===
==== Qualifying ====
On 9 May 2015, Spain and Latvia kicked off proceedings for the qualifying fixtures for the 2017 Rugby League World Cup qualifying. It was a do or die match with the winner advancing to a qualifying group stage, already containing Malta and Greece, while the other would lose their chance of qualifying for their first ever World Cup. The Spaniards were the better team, winning the match by 20 points which therefore made them advance to the European C qualifying group stage. The team ended up winning the tournament and now advance to the final round robin tournament. In the final phase of qualifying, Spain took on Italy and Ireland, however two losses in those matches saw them miss out in their bid to qualify for their first ever Rugby League World Cup.

== Current squad ==
The 22-man national team squad selected for the first match day of the 2021 Rugby League World Cup European play-off tournament.

| Pos. | Player | Caps | Points | Club |
|---|---|---|---|---|
| Fullback | Luc Franco | 5 | 14 | (France) Racing Club Albi XIII |
| Wing | Alexis Escamilia | 0 | 0 | (France) AS Carcassonne |
| Wing | Romain Franco | 2 | 4 | (France) Catalans Dragons |
| Wing | Hadriel Mohamed Gonzales | 7 | 20 | (Spain) Torrent Tigres |
| Wing | Ludovic Renu | 0 | 0 | (France) Villegailhenc-Aragon XIII |
| Centre | Alex Doutres | 7 | 32 | (France) Palau XIII Broncos |
| Centre | Simon Juarez | 0 | 0 | (France) Racing Club Albi XIII |
| Centre | Antonio Puerta | 7 | 16 | (Spain) Custodians Madrid |
| Five-eighth | Daniel Garcia | 9 | 60 | (England) Crosfields |
| Halfback | Miguel Blanco-Charters | 4 | 8 | (England) Seaton Rangers |
| Halfback | Romain Pallares | 2 | 12 | (France) AS Carcassonne |
| Prop | Adria Alonso | 10 | 0 | (Spain) Xativa Roosters |
| Prop | Carlos Font | 1 | 0 | (Spain) Xativa Roosters |
| Prop | Maxime Garcia | 2 | 0 | (France) Racing Club Albi XIII |
| Prop | Juan Mudarra | 2 | 0 | (Spain) Custodians Madrid |
| Hooker | Julien Agullo | 0 | 0 | (France) AS Carcassonne |
| Second-row | Kevin Aparicio | 4 | 0 | (France) Rennes ÉC |
| Second-row | Emir-Walid Bouregba | 0 | 0 | (France) Lézignan Sangliers |
| Second-row | Anthony Delgado | 2 | 4 | (France) AS Carcassonne |
| Second-row | Gaetan Estruga | 0 | 0 | (France) Racing Club Albi XIII |
| Second-row | Rafael Garcia | 2 | 10 | (Spain) Custodians Madrid |
| Lock | Miquel Tomas Enrique | 0 | 0 | (Spain) Torrent Tigres |

== Competitive record ==
=== Overview ===
International record for the Spain national team as of 29 September 2022.

| Team | Play | Win | Draw | Loss | Win% | For | Against | Difference |
|---|---|---|---|---|---|---|---|---|
| Belgium | 2 | 2 | 0 | 0 | 100% | 66 | 20 | +46 |
| Germany | 1 | 0 | 0 | 1 | 0% | 16 | 32 | –16 |
| Greece | 1 | 1 | 0 | 0 | 100% | 76 | 4 | +72 |
| Ireland | 2 | 0 | 0 | 2 | 0% | 14 | 88 | –74 |
| Italy | 2 | 0 | 0 | 2 | 0% | 8 | 128 | –120 |
| Latvia | 1 | 1 | 0 | 0 | 100% | 32 | 12 | +20 |
| Malta | 1 | 1 | 0 | 0 | 100% | 40 | 30 | +10 |
| Netherlands | 1 | 0 | 0 | 1 | 0% | 30 | 36 | –6 |
| Russia | 2 | 1 | 0 | 1 | 50% | 38 | 64 | –26 |
| Serbia | 2 | 0 | 0 | 2 | 0% | 24 | 88 | –64 |
| Total | 15 | 6 | 0 | 9 | 40.00% | 344 | 502 | –158 |

=== Results ===
Win Draw Loss

==== 2010s ====
| | Date | Home | Result | Away | Competition | Venue | Crowd | Report |
|---|---|---|---|---|---|---|---|---|
| 1 | 25 May 2014 | Belgium | 10–12 | Spain | Friendly | (Belgium) Neder-Over-Heembeek | | ERL |
| 2 | 8 June 2014 | Spain | 54–10 | Belgium | Friendly | (Spain) Moncada, Valencia | | ERL |
| 3 | 9 May 2015 | Latvia | 12–32 | Spain | 2015 European Championship C | (Latvia) Riga | 150 | ERL |
| 4 | 6 June 2015 | Spain | 16–32 | Germany | Friendly | (Spain) Valencia | | ERL |
| 5 | 19 September 2015 | Spain | 36–24 | Italy B | Friendly | (Spain) Muro de Alcoy | 1,200 | ERL |
| 6 | 26 September 2015 | Spain | 40–30 | Malta | 2015 European Championship C | (Spain) Valencia | | ERL |
| 7 | 17 October 2015 | Greece | 4–76 | Spain | 2015 European Championship C | (Greece) Athens | | ERL |
| 8 | 24 September 2016 | Spain | 4–64 | Serbia | Friendly | (Spain) Valencia | | ERL |
| 9 | 15 October 2016 | Russia | 40–6 | Spain | 2017 World Cup Qualifying | (Russia) Fili Stadium, Moscow | 427 | ERL |
| 10 | 22 October 2016 | Spain | 6–46 | Ireland | 2017 World Cup Qualifying | (Spain) Valencia | 323 | ERL |
| 11 | 10 June 2017 | Italy | 94–4 | Spain | Friendly | (Italy) Saluzzo | | ERL |
| 12 | 6 October 2018 | Spain | 32–24 | Russia | European Championship B | (Spain) Valencia | | ERL |
| 13 | 20 October 2018 | Serbia | 24–20 | Spain | European Championship B | (Serbia) Makiš Stadium, Belgrade | 150 | ERL |
| 14 | 26 October 2019 | Spain | 8–42 | Ireland | 2021 World Cup Qualifying | (Spain) Ciutat de I'Esport Xàtiva | 1,013 | ERL |
| 15 | 2 November 2019 | Italy | 34–4 | Spain | 2021 World Cup Qualifying | (Italy) Stadio G. Teghil, Lignano Sabbiadoro | | ERL |

==== 2020s ====
| | Date | Home | Result | Away | Competition | Venue | Crowd | Report |
|---|---|---|---|---|---|---|---|---|
| 16 | 17 September 2022 | Spain | 30–36 | Netherlands | Friendly | (Spain) Getafe | | ERL |

=== World Cup ===
World Cup record
| Year | Round | Position | GP | W | L | D |
|---|---|---|---|---|---|---|
| (Australia) (New Zealand) 2017 | Did not qualify | | | | | |
| (England) 2021 | Did not qualify | | | | | |
| Total | 0 Titles | 0/13 | 0 | 0 | 0 | 0 |

== Honours ==
European Bowl: 2015

== IRL Rankings ==
IRL Men's World Rankings
Official rankings as of August 2026
| Rank | Change | Team | Pts % |
| 1 | Steady | Australia | 100 |
| 2 | Steady | New Zealand | 82 |
| 3 | Steady | England | 70 |
| 4 | Steady | Samoa | 56 |
| 5 | Steady | Tonga | 54 |
| 6 | Steady | Papua New Guinea | 47 |
| 7 | Steady | Fiji | 34 |
| 8 | ▲1 | Cook Islands | 24 |
| 9 | ▲2 | Netherlands | 23 |
| 10 | ▲2 | Ukraine | 21 |
| 11 | ▼3 | France | 21 |
| 12 | ▼2 | Serbia | 20 |
| 13 | Steady | Wales | 18 |
| 14 | Steady | Ireland | 17 |
| 15 | Steady | Greece | 14 |
| 16 | Steady | Malta | 14 |
| 17 | ▲12 | Canada | 13 |
| 18 | ▼1 | Italy | 11 |
| 19 | ▼1 | Jamaica | 9 |
| 20 | ▲7 | Scotland | 8 |
| 21 | ▲1 | United States | 8 |
| 22 | ▼3 | Poland | 7 |
| 23 | ▼3 | Lebanon | 7 |
| 24 | ▼1 | Germany | 7 |
| 25 | ▼1 | Czech Republic | 6 |
| 26 | ▼5 | Norway | 6 |
| 27 | ▼2 | Chile | 5 |
| 28 | ▲2 | Philippines | 5 |
| 29 | ▼1 | South Africa | 4 |
| 30 | Steady | Brazil | 3 |
| 31 | Steady | Morocco | 3 |
| 32 | ▲1 | Argentina | 3 |
| 33 | ▲2 | Ghana | 2 |
| 34 | ▲2 | Kenya | 2 |
| 35 | ▼1 | Montenegro | 2 |
| 36 | ▲1 | Nigeria | 2 |
| 37 | ▼5 | North Macedonia | 1 |
| 38 | Steady | Albania | 1 |
| 39 | Steady | Turkey | 1 |
| 40 | Steady | Bulgaria | 1 |
| 41 | Steady | Cameroon | 0 |
| 42 | Steady | Japan | 0 |
| 43 | Steady | Spain | 0 |
| 44 | Steady | Colombia | 0 |
| 45 | Steady | Russia | 0 |
| 46 | Steady | El Salvador | 0 |
| 47 | Steady | Bosnia and Herzegovina | 0 |
| 48 | Steady | Hong Kong | 0 |
| 49 | Steady | Solomon Islands | 0 |
| 50 | Steady | Vanuatu | 0 |
| 51 | Steady | Hungary | 0 |
| 52 | Steady | Latvia | 0 |
| 53 | Steady | Denmark | 0 |
| 54 | Steady | Belgium | 0 |
| 55 | Steady | Estonia | 0 |
| 56 | Steady | Sweden | 0 |
| 57 | Steady | Niue | 0 |
Complete rankings at www.internationalrugbyleague.com
