= 2005 European Nations Cup =

- Number of teams: 6
- Winner: France (7th title)
- Matches played: 7
- Points scored: 349 (49.86 per match)

The 2005 European Nations Cup saw France secure their first win over Wales in 24 years, winning 38–16 and taking the European Nations Cup back to France.

The revamped competition involved six teams competing in two groups of three. Five of the teams: France, Ireland, Scotland, Wales, Russia qualified automatically for the tournament, whilst new entrant Georgia came through a qualifying tournament.

== Qualifying tournament ==
=== Results ===
29 April

Georgia	34–14	Netherlands

18 June

Netherlands	26–10	Serbia

24 July

Georgia	44–12	Serbia

=== Final standings ===
Team	Played	Won	Drew	Lost	For	Against	Diff	Points
Georgia	2	2	0	0	78	26	52	4
Netherlands	2	1	0	1	40	44	−4	2
Serbia	2	0	0	2	22	70	−48	0

Georgia advanced to Group 2.

== Group 1 ==
=== Results ===
16 October

Wales	22–14	Scotland

Brewery Field, Bridgend

23 October

Scotland	6–12	Ireland

Glasgow Hawks Rugby Football Club, Glasgow

29 October

Ireland	8–31	Wales

Terenure College Rugby Football Club, Dublin

=== Final standings ===
Team	Played	Won	Drew	Lost	For	Against	Diff	Points
Wales	2	2	0	0	53	22	+31	4
Ireland	2	1	0	1	20	37	−17	2
Scotland	2	0	0	2	20	34	−14	0

Wales advanced to the final.

== Group 2 ==
=== Results ===
15 October

France	80–0	Russia

Arles

23 October

Russia	48–14	Georgia

Luzhniki Stadium, Moscow

30 October

Georgia	0–60	France

Vake Stadium, Tbilisi

=== Final standings ===
Team	Played	Won	Drew	Lost	For	Against	Diff	Points
France	2	2	0	0	140	0	+140	4
Russia	2	1	0	1	48	94	−46	2
Georgia	2	0	0	2	14	88	−94	0

France advanced to the final.

== Final ==
5 November

France	38–16	Wales

Stade Albert Domec, Carcassonne
