= Balkan Super League =

Rugby league football competition for clubs in the Balkans region of Europe

- Current season or competition: 2024 Balkan Super League season
- Sport: Rugby league
- Inaugural season: 2017; 9 years ago
- Number of teams: 5
- Country: Bulgaria (1 teams); Montenegro (1 team); Serbia (3 teams)
- Champions: (Serbia) Partizan Belgrade RLFC (2024)
- Most titles: (Serbia) Red Star Rugby League Club; 5 titles)
- Website: BSL website
- Broadcast partner: Sportuzivo

The Balkan Super League is a rugby league football competition for clubs in the Balkans region of Europe. The competition operates in addition to the national leagues of the respective nations as a Champions League-style competition, with some clubs holding licences to compete annually, like the EuroLeague. As of 2022 clubs from Serbia, Greece, Turkey, Albania, Bulgaria, Bosnia and Herzegovina, Italy and Montenegro have competed.

== History ==
The Balkan Super League first round started 11 April 2017. Partizan defeated Red Star 32–26 in the inaugural Balkan Super League Grand Final.

The competition will expand to 15 teams in 2018, with the addition of Greek, Montenegro and Albanian clubs. In the second Grand Final Red Star defeated Partizan. The 2019 season saw the competition split into two divisions. The 2020 season was planned to be a knock-out system with 11 clubs competing from 5 countries: Bosnia and Herzegovina, Bulgaria, Serbia, Montenegro and Turkey, but was cancelled due to the COVID-19 Pandemic.

The 2022 format featured an incomplete round robin followed by a Grand Final.

== Teams ==
=== Current clubs ===
Below are the teams for the 2023 season.

==== Division 1 ====
Team	Country	Domestic League
(Greece) AEK Athens	Greece	Greek Rugby League Association
(Montenegro) Arsenal Tivat	Montenegro	Montenegro Rugby League
(Bulgaria) Lokomotiv Sofia RLFC	Bulgaria	Bulgarian Rugby League
(Serbia) Partizan Belgrade RLFC	Serbia	Serbian Rugby League Championship
(Serbia) Radnicki Nis	Serbia	Serbian Rugby League Championship
(Serbia) Red Star Belgrade RLFC	Serbia	Serbian Rugby League Championship

==== Division 2 ====
Team	Country	Domestic League
Division 2 North
(Turkey) Bilgi Badgers RLFC	Turkey	Turkish Rugby League Association
(Turkey) Boshporus Wolves RLFC	Turkey	Turkish Rugby League Association
(Bulgaria) Valiacite Pernik	Bulgaria	Bulgarian Rugby League
(Serbia) Zemun Belgrade	Serbia	Serbian Rugby League Championship
Division 2 South
(Albania) Tirana RLFC	Albania	Albanian Rugby League
(Serbia) Morava Cheetahs Lescovka	Serbia	Serbian Rugby League Championship
(Montenegro) Mornar Bar	Montenegro	Montenegro Rugby League

=== Former clubs ===
- (Bosnia and Herzegovina) Borac Banja Luka RLFC
- (Bosnia and Herzegovina) Warriors Drvar RLFC
- (Bosnia and Herzegovina) FIS Vitez Knights RLFC
- (Bulgaria) Valacite Pernik RLFC
- (Greece) Aris Eagles RLFC
- (Greece) Patras RLFC
- (Greece) Rhodes Knights RLFC
- (Italy) Lignano Sharks RLFC
- (Montenegro) South Region RLFC
- (Serbia) Belgrade Youth RLFC
- (Serbia) Dorcol Belgrade RLFC
- (Serbia) Radnicki New Belgrade RLFC
- (Serbia) Red Kangaroo Belgrade RLFC
- (Serbia) Tzar Dusan Mighty RLFC
- (Turkey) Ankara Phrygians RLFC
- (Turkey) Bilgi Badgers RLFC
- (Turkey) Boshporus Wolves RLFC
- (Turkey) Kladikoy Bulls RLFC

== Champions ==
Balkan Super League winners
Season	Winner	Country
2017	Partizan Belgrade	Serbia
2018	Red Star Belgrade	Serbia
2019	Red Star Belgrade	Serbia
2020	Partizan Belgrade	Serbia
2021	Red Star Belgrade	Serbia
2022	Red Star Belgrade	Serbia
2023	Red Star Belgrade	Serbia
2024	Partizan Belgrade	Serbia
