= 2014 Balkans Cup (rugby league) =

- Number of teams: 4
- Host country: Serbia
- Winner: Greece (1st title)
- Matches played: 4
- Attendance: 750 (188 per match)
- Points scored: 212 (53 per match)
- Tries scored: 42 (10.5 per match)

The 2014 Balkans Cup was a rugby league football tournament that was held in Serbia between 17 October and 19 October. The winner won the inaugural Balkans Cup Trophy.

Four teams competed in the 2014 event. These teams were: Serbia, Greece, Hungary and Bosnia.

After winning the European Championship C a week before the tournament began, Greece transferred their form to the tournament and were crowned inaugural Balkans Cup winners after defeating Bosnia and then Serbia in the final.

== Teams ==
| Team | Coach | Captain | RLIF Rank |
|---|---|---|---|
| Serbia | (Serbia) Marko Jankovic | Stefan Nedeljković | 17 |
| Greece | (Australia) Steve Georgallis | Jordan Meads | 26 |
| Hungary | (France) Laurent Dupuy | Norbert Csapkai | 33 |
| Bosnia and Herzegovina | (Bosnia and Herzegovina) Sreten Zec | Sreten Zec | NA |

== Venues ==
| Stadium | Games | City | State | Capacity | Best Crowd |
|---|---|---|---|---|---|
| Makiš Stadium | 3 | Čukarica | Belgrade | 4,000 | 450 (Final) |
| Stadion FK Dorćol | 1 | Dorćol | Belgrade | 1,000 | 150 |

== Fixtures ==
=== Day 1 ===
==== Serbia v. Hungary ====
17 October 2014
15:00 (GMT+2)

| Serbia | 50 – 0 | Hungary |
|---|---|---|
| Tries: Slobodan Manak (2) 4' c, 10' c Stefan Nikolić (2) 15' c, 23' c Milan Ilić (2) 20' c, 47'; Aleksandar Radovanović 29' c Milan Čobanović 33' c Djordje Gak 77'; Goals: Vladislav Dedić (7/9) 5', 11', 16', 21', 24', 30', 34' | Report |

FK Dorćol, Belgrade
Attendance: 150
Referee: (Greece) George Stilianos
Player of the Match: (Serbia) Slobodan Manak

==== Bosnia v. Greece ====
17 October 2014
15:00 (GMT+2)

| Bosnia and Herzegovina | 4 – 58 | Greece |
|---|---|---|
| Try: Nedeljko Suvajčević 80'; Goals: Vladan Kikanović (0/1) | Report | Tries: Jordan Kidis (2) 2', 60'; Alvaro Zota 15'; George Tsikrikas (2) 26' c, 42' c Jordan Meads (2) 34' c, 63' c Nikolaos Bosmos 37' c Jake Vrahnos (2) 55' c, 74'; Ioannis Nake 76' c Goals: Liam Sue-Tin (5/9) 26', 34', 37', 42', 55'; Jordan Meads (1/2) 63'; Jordan Kidis (1/1) 76'; Terry Constantinou (0/1) |

Makiš Stadium, Belgrade
Attendance: 50
Referee: (Serbia) Ivica Djordjević
Player of the Match: (Greece) Jordan Meads

=== Day 2 - Finals Day ===
==== Third Place Final: Bosnia v. Hungary ====
19 October 2014
12:30 (GMT+2)

| Bosnia and Herzegovina | 32 – 6 | Hungary |
|---|---|---|
| Tries: Miloš Kulašević 3' c Aleksandar Sakan 11'; Vladan Kikanović 24' c Sreten Zec 38' c Elvis Martić 44'; Slaviša Zekić 59' c Goals: Vladan Kikanović (3/5) 3', 24', 38'; Ognjen Dedić (1/1) 59' | | Try: Grimm 62' c Goals: Nikowitz (1/1) 62' |

Makiš Stadium, Belgrade
Attendance: 100
Referee: (Serbia) Radoslav Novaković
Player of the Match: (Bosnia and Herzegovina) Elvis Martić

==== Grand Final: Serbia v. Greece ====
19 October 2014
15:00 (GMT+2)

| Serbia | 22 – 50 | Greece |
|---|---|---|
| Tries: Džavid Jašari 19' c Nikola Srbljanin 34' c Pero Madžarević (2) 54' c, 71'; Goals: Stefan Nedeljković (3/5) 19', 34', 54' | Report | Tries: Sebastian Sell 2'; Billy Tsikrikas 4', 45' c, 59'; Jake Vrahnos 9' c Panagiotis Lampoussis 39'; Jordan Meads (2) 49', 62' c George Tsikrikas 65' c Terry Constantinou 68' c Goals: Liam Sue-Tin (4/9) 9', 45', 62', 65'; Jordan Meads (1/1) 68' |

Makiš Stadium, Belgrade
Attendance: 450
Referee: (Serbia) Miloš Milinković
Player of the Match: (Greece) Billy Tsikrikas

- Greece are the inaugural Balkans Cup champions
