= Spanish Campeonato Nacional Liga =

Spanish rugby league competition

- Current season or competition: Spanish Campeonato Nacional Liga 2017-18
- Sport: Rugby league
- Inaugural season: 2017-18
- Number of teams: 6
- Country: Spain (AEdRL)

The Espana Campeonato Nacional Liga (Spanish National Championship) is a rugby league competition that comprises six Spanish rugby league clubs. Launched in 2017, ahead of the 2017–18 season, the new format includes ten rounds, followed by playoffs and a final. Five of the clubs are from Valencia (Bufals, Ontinyent, Torrent, Valencia and Xativa), and Custodians Madrid are the representative of the capital region of Spain.

== Seasons ==
2017-18 is the inaugural season of the Spanish Championship, though other domestic-level competitions have been played since 2013.

== Teams ==
The 2019-20 lineup of teams is the following:

- Xativa Roosters
- Ontinyent
- Custodians Madrid
- Torrent Tigers
- Valencian Warriors
- Bufals XIII

== Schedule ==
The 2017–18 season's schedule features 4 rounds and a Christmas break, before returning for 6 rounds before finals.

== See also ==
- Rugby league in Spain
- Spanish Campeonato Nacional Liga 2017-18
