= Rugby league in Georgia =

Rugby league is a team sport, originating in England, formerly played in Georgia.

== History ==
The history of rugby league in Georgia began in 1991 when a Georgian player was recruited by a Russian rugby league club. In 1993 a rural Georgian rugby union club team defected to the Russian Rugby League. The club and all of its players were banned from playing rugby union in the future.

Despite these previous endeavours rugby league was effectively unknown in Georgia until late 2004 when a French-based rugby enthusiast Paata Tsintsadze established the Georgian National Rugby League Federation (GNRLF). In June 2004 the GNRLF was incorporated, and recognised by the State Sports Ministry. Nodar Andghuladze was the first chief executive officer and David Kilassonia the coaching manager.

Tsintsadze presented to the European Federation his proposal and plans for the GNRLF after which it was agreed that the GNRLF be recognised as the governing body for the sport in Georgia. Furthermore, Georgia became active participants in the European Federation's meetings and activities from then on.

Early in 2005, the GNRLF team set the ambitious goal of sending the national team, which had not yet been played a game, to the 2008 Rugby League World Cup.

On 5 September 2005 the GNRLF were told that official observer status of the GNRLF would be withdrawn with immediate effect and given to the new Georgian Rugby 13 (GR13) organisation. Despite RLEF's decision to recognize the newly founded GR13F instead of the former GNRLF as official observers of the code in Georgia, the latter showed reluctance in handing over the under 16 matters to the GR13. This ultimately meant that Georgia were unable to attend the youth world championship.

== Governing body ==
The governing body for rugby league in Georgia was the Georgian Rugby League Federation. It was founded in 2004 by former France rugby union player, Paata Tsintsadze.

== National team ==
The Georgia national rugby league team represented Georgia in international rugby league tournaments. The national squad was entirely from Georgian-based rugby union players. Despite there having been no domestic rugby league the team attracted relatively large crowds for international matches, in the range of 10,000 spectators. However, they were expelled from the 2008 Rugby League World Cup qualifiers for forfeiting a game in Russia, due to their players playing rugby union at the time and subsequently stopped playing the game and were expelled from the Rugby League International Federation and Rugby League European Federation.
