= Red Star Rugby League Club =

Serbian rugby league club, based in Belgrade, Serbia

- Founded: 2006; 20 years ago
- League: Serbian Rugby League
- Team history: Originally founded as a rugby league club in 1956
- Based in: Belgrade, Serbia
- Colors
- President: (Serbia) Dragan Živković
- Head coach: (Serbia) Vojislav Dedić
- Broadcasters: CKM Red 288
- Local media: CKM Red 288
- Website: rlkcrvenazvezda.com

Red Star Rugby League Club or origin Ragbi Liga Klub Crvena Zvezda (Serbian: Ragbi 13 Klub Crvena Zvezda/Рагби 13 Клуб Црвена Звезда) is a Serbian rugby league club based in Belgrade and competing in the Serbian Rugby League Championship.

Red Star Rugby League Club is member of the Red Star Sports Society.

In December 2018 it was announced that the club will play in the British based knockout competition, the 2019 Challenge Cup, on the condition that matches in the first two rounds will be played away from home.

Red Star Belgrade Rugby League Club has developed one of the strongest domestic rugby league clubs outside of the traditional rugby league heartlands of the game in the northern hemisphere through a combination of youth and local player development, with importing coaches and a small number of players with experience. This worked particularly well between 2018 and 2019 when Australians Jack O'Brien and Darcy Etrich and Scotland's Sam Herron had stints with the club. The perspective of the club's management was that overseas players would assist the development of the local players and expand their rugby league knowledge.

Due to Red Star Rugby League being unbeaten through 2018 and 2019, the club management allowed the imported players to leave the club and focused on the development of the local playing group and juniors in 2020. This was also exacerbated by the Covid-19 pandemic, with the club being forced to send Phil Economidis home, and then allowing Vladica Nikolic to return to France in late August 2020.

Red Star's future goals are to support the development of European Rugby League club competitions that are aligned with the goals of the RLEF and the Serbian Rugby League Federation.

== Squad ==
Current Squad:

- (Serbia) Miloš Zogović
- (Serbia) Rajko Trifunović
- (Serbia) Denis Čengaj
- (Serbia) Petar Milanović
- (Serbia) Aleksandar Đorđević
- (Serbia) Vojislav Dedić
- (Serbia) Stefan Nedeljković
- (Serbia) Vuk Štrbac
- (Serbia) Vladislav Dedić
- (Serbia) Slobodan Manak
- (Serbia) Marko Janković
- (Serbia) Marko Šatev
- (Serbia) Nikola Đurić
- (Serbia) Miloš Ćalić
- (Serbia) Valentino Milovanović
- (Serbia) Uroš Martinović
- (Serbia) Nenad Žujić
- (Serbia) Miroslav Selimovski
- (Serbia) Balša Žarković
- (Serbia) Miodrag Tomić
- (Serbia) Luka Trifunović
- (Serbia) Adam Pavlović

== Honours ==
- Serbian Rugby League Championship
  - Winners (8): 2013–14, 2017, 2018, 2019, 2020, 2021, 2022, 2023
- Serbian Rugby League Cup
  - Winners (5): 2015–16, 2018, 2019, 2020, 2023
- Serbian Super Cup
  - Winners (4): 2015–16, 2018, 2019, 2020
- Balkan Super League
  - Winners (5): 2018, 2019, 2021, 2022, 2023

== See also ==
- Red Star Belgrade
- SD Crvena Zvezda
- Rugby Football League expansion
