= Mikheil Meskhi Stadium =

Football stadium in Tbilisi, Georgia

Coordinates: 41°42′35″N 44°44′46″E

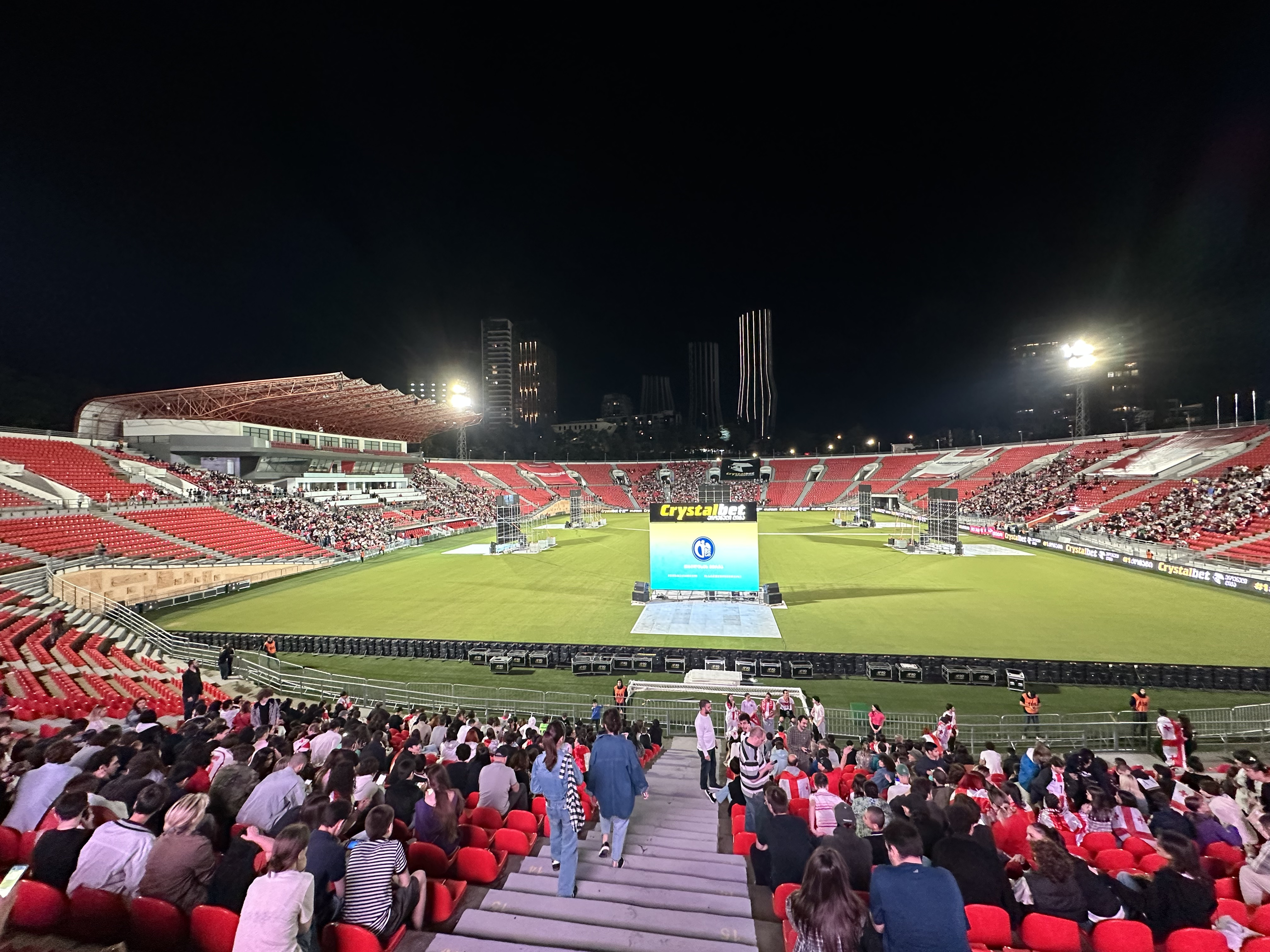
- UEFA Category 4 Stadium
- Interactive map of Mikheil Meskhi Stadium
- Full name: Mikheil Meskhi Stadium
- Former names: Lokomotivi Stadium (1952–2005)
- Address: Tbilisi; Georgia
- Location: (Georgia (country)) Tbilisi, Georgia
- Owner: Government of Georgia
- Capacity: 27,223
- Field size: 105 m × 68 m (344 ft × 223 ft)

Construction
- Opened: 1952

Tenants
- FC Locomotive Tbilisi; FC Iberia 1999; Black Lion; Georgia national football team Georgia national rugby union team Georgia national rugby league team

The Mikheil Meskhi Stadium (Georgian: მიხეილ მესხის სტადიონი mikheil meskhis st’adioni), also known as the Lokomotivi Stadium, is a football-specific stadium in Tbilisi, Georgia named after the famous Georgian international footballer, Mikheil Meskhi (1937–1991). It is used mostly for football matches, and occasionally for rugby union and rugby league matches.

The stadium was converted from being a multi-purpose stadium into the current configuration in 2001 and has a capacity to hold 27,223 people.

== See also ==
- Boris Paichadze Stadium
- Georgia national rugby union team
- Georgia national football team
- Georgia national rugby league team
- Stadiums in Georgia
