= Serbian Rugby League Cup =

The Serbian Rugby League Cup is a rugby league competition. It was established in 2001. The competition was suspended after three seasons but was restarted in 2008.

== History ==
The Serbian Cup was established in 2001 and for the first three years was won by Donji Dorćol who merged with Gornji Dorćol in 2004. When the tournament resumed in 2008, Dorćol extended the run to eleven consecutive wins before Red Star defeated them in the 2016 final. Partizan won the cup for the first time in 2017. This was followed by three further wins by Red Star and two more by Partizan. In 2023, Red Star won the cup for the fifth time, while in 2024 the winners and current Cup holders are Dorćol Tigers.

== Finals ==
List of finals
Year	Winning team	Score	Losing team	Venue	Att.	Ref.
2001	Donji Dorćol	24–10	Beli Orao (Kruševac)	Kruševac		
2002	Donji Dorćol	46–16	Morava	Belgrade		
2003	Donji Dorćol	52–16	Novi Sad	Novi Sad		
2008	Dorćol	32–22	Podbara (Novi Sad)	Petrovaradin	500	
2009	Dorćol	92–10	Podbara (Novi Sad)	SC Inge, Belgrade	300	
2010	Dorćol	98–2	Car Lazar (Kruševac)	SC Inge, Belgrade		
2011	Dorćol	18–0	Car Lazar (Kruševac)	Belgrade		
2012	Dorćol	62–36	Radnički (Nova Pazova)	FK Dorćol, Belgrade		
2013	Dorćol	68–4	Soko (Vranje)	FK Dinamo Pančevo, Pančevo		
2014	Dorćol	40–26	Red Star	Makiš Stadium, Belgrade	500	
2015	Dorćol	38–34	Red Star	Makiš Stadium, Belgrade	400	
2016	Red Star	36–20	Dorćol	Stadion FK Radnički, Belgrade	500	
2017	Partizan	42–22	Dorćol	Makiš Stadium, Belgrade	200	
2018	Red Star	56–6	Partizan	Makiš Stadium, Belgrade	200	
2019	Red Star	42–12	Radnički Niš	Čair Stadium, Niš	150	
2020	Red Star	38–6	Dorćol Tigrovi	SC Inge, Belgrade	150	
2021	Partizan	80–8	Radnički Niš	FC Heroj Polet Stadium, Belgrade		
2022	Partizan	27–24	Red Star	FK Sava 45, Belgrade	100	
2023	Red Star	14–2	Partizan	FK Heroj Polet Stadium, Belgrade	50	
2024	Dorćol	22–18	Partizan	FK Heroj Polet Stadium, Belgrade		
2025	Partizan	50–30	Red Star	FK Heroj Polet Stadium, Belgrade		

=== List of teams by number of wins ===
List of teams by number of wins
	Club	Wins	Years
1	Dorćol (Note: as Donji Dorćol (2001–2003))	12	2001, 2002, 2003, 2008, 2009. 2010. 2011. 2012. 2013, 2014, 2015, 2024
2	Red Star	5	2016, 2018, 2019, 2020, 2023
3	Partizan	4	2017, 2021, 2022, 2025

== See also ==
- List of rugby league competitions
