= Georgia national rugby league team =

Georgia
Team information
- Nickname: 13 Georgians
- Governing body: Georgia Rugby League
- Region: Europe
- Most caps: Giorgi Assatiani (6); Aleksandre Guilauri (6)
- Top try-scorers: Lexo Gugava (4); Merab Kvirikashvili (4)
- Top point-scorer: Merab Kvirikashvili (46)

Uniforms
First colours

Team results
- First international
- Netherlands 14–34 Georgia (Rotterdam, Netherlands; 29 April 2005)
- Biggest win
- Georgia 57–16 Netherlands (Tbilisi, Georgia; 26 May 2006)
- Biggest defeat
- France 60–0 Georgia (Tbilisi, Georgia; 30 October 2005)
- World Cup
- Appearances: 0

The Georgia national rugby league team represented Georgia in rugby league football. It played its first international game in 2005. The Georgian team play in a red jersey with a white cross on the front. Before a match, they performed their own "haka", called the Perkhuli (meaning "footwork").

== History ==
The history of rugby league in Georgia began in 1991 when a Georgian player was recruited by a Russian rugby league club. In 1993 a rural Georgian rugby union club team defected to the Russian Rugby League; the club and all of its players were banned from playing rugby union for life.

In 2004 Paata Tsintsadze established rugby league in Georgia, with the backing of the Rugby League European Federation. In June 2004 the Georgia Rugby League (GRL) was incorporated, and recognised by the State Sports Ministry. Nodar Andghuladze was the first Chief Executive Officer and David Kilassonia the coaching manager. Soon after rugby union clubs Locomotivi (Railways RC) and Hooligana RC joined the GRL, alongside a third club, the newly founded Raindebi (Knights).

Georgia played its first international match on April 29, 2005 against Netherlands in Rotterdam. Most of the Georgian team were primarily rugby union players, several playing their first organised match of rugby league. The first international match on Georgian soil took place on July 24, 2005 at Dynamo Stadium, Tbilisi. In that match Georgia defeated Serbia 44–12 in front of 8000 spectators.

After winning a position to compete in the 2005 European Nations Cup, Georgia performed admirably against Russia, going down 48 to 14. After the defeat, Georgia took on six-time European Champions France, going down 60 to nil, in a rain soaked Vake Stadium in Georgia.

=== 2008 World Cup Qualifying ===
In 2006, Georgia defeated the Netherlands and Serbia in the first round of World Cup Qualifying and thereby qualified to participate in the second round with Scotland and Wales. The winner of that pool would qualify for the 2008 World Cup, with the runner up entering the Repecharge round.

However, their final first round fixture against Russia was abandoned after the Georgian team had their visa applications rejected. A subsequent investigation discovered that Georgia had actually forfeited the match because their players were representing the rugby union team. Georgia were found guilty of bringing the game into disrepute, ejected from the competition and banned from RLIF events for two years; Russia were awarded the fixture 24–0.

Rugby league has not been played in Georgia since, and no plans are in place to resume competition.

== Results ==
For matches played by the Soviet Union and the Commonwealth of Independent States, see Russia national rugby league team

Date	Opponent	Score	Competition	Venue	Attendance	Reports
29 April 2005	Netherlands	34 – 14	2005 European Nations Cup qualifying	Hoekse Boys FC, Rotterdam	327	
24 July 2005	Serbia	44 – 12	2005 European Nations Cup qualifying	Boris Paichadze Dinamo Arena, Tbilisi	8,000	
23 October 2005	Russia	14 – 48	2005 European Nations Cup	Luzhniki Stadium, Moscow	500	
30 October 2005	France	0 – 60	2005 European Nations Cup	Vake Stadium, Tbilisi	400	
13 May 2006	Serbia	45 – 10	2008 World Cup qualifying	Radnički Stadium, Belgrade		
26 May 2006	Netherlands	57 – 16	2008 World Cup qualifying	Mikheil Meskhi Stadium, Tbilisi	10,935	
22 June 2006	Russia	0 – 24	2008 World Cup qualifying	—N/a	—N/a	

== See also ==
- Rugby league in Georgia
