= Serbian Rugby League Championship =

- Sport: Rugby league
- Instituted: 2001
- Inaugural season: 2002
- Number of teams: 17
- Country: Serbia
- Champions: Partizan (2025)
- Most titles: Dorćol (14)
- Website: ragbiligesrbije.rs
- Related competition: Serbian Cup; Serbian Super Cup; Uni League; Serbian Origin Cup

The Serbian Rugby League Championship (Serbian: Првенство Србије у рагбију 13/ Prvenstvo Srbije u ragbiju 13) is a domestic competition of rugby league played in Serbia. The competition started in 2002 when 4 teams played each other twice, once at home and once away, from April through to August. It was deemed a success and so the league continued in 2003. Since then new teams have been added and some have disappeared. Seasons 2007 and 2008 saw stabilization of rugby league scene in the country. Clubs like Podbara Novi Sad and Palilulac Hammers (Serbian: Палилулац Чекићар / Palilulac Čekićar) from the city of Niš entered the competition. Very soon, Faculty of Political Sciences (FPN XIII) from Belgrade formed their own rugby league team, which is the first student's rugby team of any code in the country and the region. Their place in competition was taken by Belgrade University XIII, while FPN XIII and other students' teams form University League of Serbia - UniLeague. In 2009, it was formed lower grade competition for the first time, for emerging clubs.

As new clubs are establishing and joining Serbian Rugby League Federation, further development and quality raise is expected in the following years.

== Teams ==
In total, 29 teams have played in the league, with Dorćol being the only team who have played every year. Beside each club name, in brackets, is what years the club has taken part in the league.

- Belgrade University (08, 09, 10)
- White Eagle - Kruševac (02, 03)
- Fighter - Rakovica (03)
- Tsar Lazar - Kruševac (10, 11, 12, 13, 14)
- Dorćol Spiders Belgrade (02, 03, 04, 05, 06, 07, 08, 09, 10, 11, 12, 13, 14, 15, 16, 17, 18, 19, 23)
- FPN XIII - Belgrade(07)
- Kolubara - Lazarevac (08)
- New Belgrade (12, 13, 14, 15, 16)
- Morava Eels - Belgrade (02, 03, 04, 05, 06, 10)
- Morava Cheetahs - Leskovac (11, 12, 13, 14, 15, 16, 17, 18, 19, 20, 21, 22, 23)
- Mosquitos Belgrade (03)
- Novi Sad (02, 03, 04)
- Pančevo (06)
- Radnički Niš (formerly Palilulac Hammers) (07, 08, 09, 10, 11, 12, 13, 14, 15, 16, 17, 18, 19, 20, 21, 22, 23)
- Red and Whites (formerly Podbara) - Novi Sad (07, 08, 09, 10, 12, 13, 14)
- Radnički - Nova Pazova (08, 09, 10, 11, 12, 13, 14, 15, 16)
- Red Star - Belgrade (07, 08, 09, 10, 11, 12, 13, 14, 15, 16, 17, 18, 19, 20, 21, 22, 23)
- Red Kangaroo - Belgrade, second team of Red Star (18)
- Falcon - Vranje (11, 12, 13, 14, 15, 16, 17, 18)
- Old Town - Belgrade (11, 12, 13, 14)
- Vojvodina - Novi Sad (04, 05, 06)
- Heroj Polet (formerly Voždovac Dragons) - Belgrade (05, 13, 14, 15, 22)
- Radnički - Belgrade, from season 2017 Radnički New Belgrade (13, 14, 17, 18, 19, 20, 21, 22, 23)
- Tašmajdan Tigers - Belgrade (14, 15, 16, 17, 18, 19), from season 2020 Dorćol Tigers (21, 22)
- Military Academy (13, 14)
- Dragon Zemun (13, 14, 15), from season 2022 only RLC Zemun (22, 23)
- Policeman - Belgrade (13, 14)
- Duke/Unity - Pančevo (13, 14)
- Partizan - Belgrade (14, 15, 16, 17, 18, 19, 20, 21, 22, 23)
- Tzar Dušan Paraćin (17, 18, 19, 20, 21, 22)
- Belgrade Youth Rugby League club (20)

== Format ==
2012 competition sees ten teams divided in two quality groups (A and B), with the bottom group additionally divided in two parts on geographical basis (North and South). They play home and away round robin format league. In group A, top group teams play-off with qualifying semifinal (2nd v 3rd) game in week 1. Regular season top team is the first grand finalist, while the winner of qualifying semi-final is the other. Grand final is played in week 2 at the home ground of qualifying play-off winner. In group B, top two teams from each part qualify to semi-final (North 1 v South 2, South 2 v North 1). Semifinal winners play in Group B final to decide the champion and the team who should be promoted to Group A next season. Semifinal losers play 7th/8th place playoff (in aggregate Group A+Group B), while bottom teams from each group play for 9th place.

During regular season, team earns 2 pts for win, 1 pt for tie game and no pts for loss. The team is deducted 3 pts for forfeit game.

== Finals ==
List of finals
Year	Winning team	Score	Losing team	Venue	Report
2002	Donji Dorćol	46–22	Beli Orao Kruševac	Ada Ciganlija, Belgrade	
2003	Donji Dorćol	25–4	Novi Sad	FK 21. Maj, Belgrade	
2004	Donji Dorćol	48–6	Vojvodina Novi Sad	Gradski stadion, Pančevo	
2005	Dorćol	19–0	Vojvodina Novi Sad		
2006	Dorćol	34–10	Morava Belgrade	Sports Centre Inge, Belgrade	
2007	Dorćol	16–10	Podbara Novi Sad	Sports Centre Inge, Belgrade	
2008	Dorćol	60–18	Podbara Novi Sad	Sports Centre Inge, Belgrade	
2009	Dorćol	82–0	Podbara Novi Sad	Sports Centre Inge, Belgrade	
2010	Dorćol	50–0	Red Star	FK Dorćol, Belgrade	
2011	Dorćol	74–6	Car Lazar Kruševac	FK Dorćol, Belgrade	ERL
2012	Dorćol	30–22	Red Star	FK Dorćol, Belgrade	ERL
2013	Dorćol	32–8	Red Star	FK Dorćol, Belgrade	SRL
2014	Red Star	36–26	Dorćol	FK Dorćol, Belgrade	
2015	Dorćol	50–34	Partizan	Stadion FK Radnički, Belgrade	SRL
2016	Dorćol	26–10	Red Star	Ada Ciganlija, Belgrade	SRL
2017	Red Star	42–22	Partizan	Ada Ciganlija, Belgrade	SRL
2018	Red Star	36–16	Partizan	SC Inge, Belgrade	ERL
2019	Red Star	50–24	Partizan	SC Inge, Belgrade	SRL
2020	Red Star	20–12	Partizan	SC Inge, Belgrade	ERL
2021	Red Star	30–18	Partizan	FK Heroj Polet Stadium, Belgrade	SRL
2022	Red Star	44–12	Partizan	FK Sava Stadium, Belgrade	SRL
2023	Red Star	22–20	Partizan	FK Sava Stadium, Belgrade	SRL
2024	Partizan	56–14	Red Star	FK Heroj Polet Stadium, Belgrade	SRL
2025	Partizan	34–14	Red Star	FK Heroj Polet Stadium, Belgrade	

=== List of teams by number of wins ===
List of teams by number of wins
	Club	Wins	Years
1	Dorćol (Note: as Donji Dorćol (2002–2004))	14	2002, 2003, 2004, 2005, 2006, 2007, 2008, 2009, 2010, 2011, 2012. 2013, 2015, 2016
2	Red Star	8	2014, 2017, 2018, 2019, 2020, 2021, 2022, 2023
3	Partizan	2	2024, 2025

== See also ==
- List of rugby league competitions
