= Serbian Rugby League =

Governing body for rugby league in Serbia

- Ragbi 13 Federacija Srbije
- Founded: 2001
- Responsibility: Serbia
- Key people: Vladan Kikanović (Chief Executive)
- Coach: Stuart Wilkinson
- Competitions: Serbian Rugby League Championship; Serbian Rugby League Cup; Serbian Rugby League Super Cup
- Website: Official website

(Serbia)

The Serbian Rugby League is the governing body for the sport of rugby league football in Serbia. The Association was formed in 2001 in Kruševac. They have been full members of the RLEF from August 2011.

== See also ==
- Rugby league in Serbia
- Serbia national rugby league team
