= Stade Makis =

Sports venue in Antananarivo, Madagascar

- Kianja Makis
- Interactive map of Stade Makis
- Address: Antananarivo; Madagascar
- Coordinates: 18°54′S 47°30′E
- Owner: Madagascan Rugby Federation
- Capacity: 20,000
- Surface: Grass

Construction
- Opened: 15 December 2012

Stade Makis is a stadium located in Antananarivo, Madagascar used for rugby union matches.

The stadium is located on a four-hectare plot in the western part of Antananarivo, four kilometers from the city center. It seats 20,000 people and includes locker rooms, a gym, and parking for 150 vehicles. It is also the headquarters of the Madagascan Rugby Federation.

On 15 December 2012, the stadium was officially opened by the President of Madagascar, Andry Rajoelina, who also laid the cornerstone a few months earlier.

Some top-flight rugby union clubs from Madagascar sometimes play at the Stade Makis in front of capacity crowds of 20,000.
