= Serbia national rugby league team =

National rugby team representing serbia

Serbia

Team information
- Nickname: White Eagles (Beli orlovi)
- Governing body: Serbian Rugby League
- Region: Europe
- Head coach: Darren Fisher
- Captain: Stevan Stevanović
- Most caps: Dalibor Vukanović (34)
- Top try-scorer: Stevan Stevanović (26)
- Top point-scorer: Dalibor Vukanović (207)
- Home stadium: Makiš Stadium, Belgrade
- IRL ranking: 12th

Uniforms
First colours

Team results
- First international
- Lebanon 102–0 Serbia (19 October 2003)
- Biggest win
- Germany 6–90 Serbia (22 April 2011)
- Biggest defeat
- France 120–0 Serbia (22 October 2003)

The Serbia national rugby league team represents Serbia in the sport of rugby league football. They have competed in international competition since 2003 under the administration of the Serbian Rugby League.

They are coached by Englishman Darren Fisher, and captained by Stevan Stevanović.

== History ==
=== 1950s–1960s ===
Rugby League was first played in Serbia in 1953 when it was introduced by Dragan Marsicevic, secretary of the Yugoslav Sport Association. Two French teams toured later that year, and in 1954 the clubs Partizan and Radnički were formed. These clubs played their first match on 26 April 1954. In 1961 a Yugoslav Rugby League team played its only game against a French Select XIII team in Banja Luka. The French team won 13–0. The sport died out soon afterwards due to the communist regime banning the sport.

=== 2000s ===
The rebirth of Serbian Rugby League Federation was on 10 November 2001 with the new federation been formed. There is now an eight team domestic competition between Dorcol Spiders, Morava Cheetahs, Red Star Belgrade, Belgrade University, Radnički Nova Pazova, Tsar Lazar, Soko, Stari Grad, and Niš.

Serbia has participated in the Mediterranean Cup competition in 2003 and 2004. Serbia won the 2006 and 2007 Slavic Cup after beating Czech Republic 36–28 in Prague and 56–16 in Belgrade, respectively.

=== 2008 World Cup Qualifying ===
Serbia failed to qualify for the 2008 Rugby League World Cup, losing to Holland, Russia and Georgia in 2006, to be eliminated from the qualification process. Serbia won the 2007 and 2010 European Shield tournaments, by beating both Germany and Czech Republic on both occasions. Serbia took part in then European 2nd tier competition Euro Med Challenge in 2008. After being defeated 4-30 by Russia in Novi Sad and 14-20 by Lebanon in Bhamdoun, Serbs finished third. Serbia was a participant in the 2009 European Cup, having been drawn in a group alongside Wales and Ireland.

=== 2013 World Cup Qualifying ===
Serbia participated in the 2013 Rugby League World Cup qualifiers in October 2011. They played games against Italy, Lebanon and Russia, but were defeated in all three matches and so were ultimately unsuccessful in qualification for the tournament.

=== 2014 Balkans Cup ===
Serbia participated in the inaugural Balkans Cup tournament held in their own country. Serbia finished second in the tournament after a defeat to Greece who had a full squad of Australian born players in the final.

=== 2017 World Cup qualifying ===
Serbia participated in the qualification for the 2017 Rugby League World Cup. The first stage of qualifying involved having to finish in the top three in their 2014–15 European Shield competition. During their qualification, Serbia created history after beating Russia for their first ever time on their eighth time of asking.

The final qualification tournament consisted of six teams: the top three teams from the European B tournament, the winners of the European C tournament and seeded nations Wales and Ireland. The tournament featured two groups of three teams playing in a single round-robin format. The winners of each group qualified for the World Cup, while the runners-up faced each other in a play-off match on 5 November 2016 to determine the final spot. A seeded draw took place to determine the groups on 5 November 2015. Serbia were placed in Group A. They took on Wales on 15 October 2016, in Llanelli Wales and Italy in Belgrade on 22 October for a place in the 2017 World Cup.

In the lead up to the World Cup qualifiers, Serbia played Spain in Valencia and ran out 64-4 winners a dominant display in the first ever meeting between these two nations.

In the first World Cup qualifier against a Wales side full of Super League and Championship players, Serbia lost, 50–0, proving that there is still a long way to go but that there was some slight improvement from last time the two nations meet in 2009 when Serbia lost 88–8.

In the second and final game of World Cup qualifying Serbia needed victory over Italy to send them through to a one-game playoff against Russia but lost the game at the Makiš Stadium in Belgrade, 14–62, which was a result against an Italian team with many NRL and English Super League players who were Australians of Italian heritage. On 10 November 2016, 15 years was celebrated since the re-forming of Serbian Rugby League a milestone occasion.

=== 2021 World Cup qualifying ===
Serbia were eliminated very early in qualifying, but caught a lucky break when Russian Rugby League Federation were disqualified due to internal issues. Serbia reluctantly took Russia's place in the final stages of qualifying but were easily eliminated losing on 26 October 2019 to Scotland 86–0 in Glasgow, then losing the deciding match in Belgrade to Greece on 9 November 2019 by another embarrassing score-line of 6–82.

== Coaching history ==
Also see Category:Serbia national rugby league team coaches.

- John Risman 2004
- Marko Janković 2006–08
- Gerard Stokes 2008–09
- Marko Janković 2010–15
- Radoslav Novaković 2015 (interim)
- Jason Green 2016
- Ljubomir Bukvić 2016–17
- Radoslav Novaković 2018 (caretaker)
- Brett Davidson 2018
- Stuart Wilkinson 2019
- Darren "Daz" Fisher 2021

== Current squad ==
The 19-man national team selected for the match against Ukraine in October 2024:

- Nicholas O'Meley (Burleigh Bears)
- Nick Cotric (Catalans Dragons)
- Andrej Mora (Dorcol Tigers)
- David Nofoaluma (Baroudeurs De Pia XIII)
- Sasha Popovic (Glebe Dirty Reds)
- Jake O'Meley (Lakes United Seagulls)
- Ilija Cotric (Mounties)
- Jesse Soric (NZ Warriors)
- Aleksandar Pavlovic (Partisan 1953)
- Djordje Krnjeta (Partisan 1953)
- Dzavid Jasari (Partisan 1953)
- Enis Bibic (Partisan 1953)
- Stevan Stevanovic (Partisan 1953)
- Marko Jankovic (Red Star)
- Milos Calic (Red Star)
- Nikola Djuric (Red Star)
- Rajko Trifunovic (Red Star)
- Vukw Strbac (Red Star)
- Jason Muranka (Free Agent)
- Jordan Grant (Wynnum-Manly)

== Competitive Record ==
=== Overall ===
Below is table of the official representative rugby league matches played by Serbia at test level up until 27 October 2024:

Opponent	Played	Won	Drawn	Lost	Win %	For	Aga	Diff
Bosnia and Herzegovina	1	1	0	0	100%	50	4	+46
Bulgaria	2	2	0	0	100%	78	36	+42
Canada	1	1	0	0	100%	36	8	+28
Czech Republic	5	4	0	1	75%	186	82	+92
France†	4	0	0	4	0%	22	284	–262
Georgia	2	0	0	2	0%	22	89	–67
Greece	5	2	0	3	25%	144	190	–46
Germany	5	4	0	1	80%	238	61	+177
Hungary	1	1	0	0	100%	50	0	+50
Ireland	2	0	0	2	0%	16	106	–90
Italy	8	4	0	4	100%	196	230	–34
Lebanon	4	0	0	4	0%	24	282	–258
Montenegro	2	2	0	0	100%	76	50	+26
Morocco	3	0	1	2	0%	30	122	–92
Netherlands	5	0	0	5	0%	66	180	–114
Philippines	1	0	0	1	0%	12	18	–6
Russia	9	2	0	7	22.22%	174	236	–62
Scotland	1	0	0	1	0%	0	86	–86
Spain	2	2	0	0	100%	88	24	+64
Ukraine	5	5	0	0	100%	218	50	+168
Wales	3	0	0	3	0%	8	186	–178
Total	70	29	1	40	41.43%	1,688	2,320	–632

†Includes matches played against the France Espoirs side.

=== World Cup ===
World Cup record
Year	Round	Position	GP	W	L	D
(France) 1954	did not enter					
(Australia) 1957	did not enter					
(United Kingdom) 1960	did not enter					
(Australia) (New Zealand) 1968	did not enter					
(United Kingdom) 1970	did not enter					
(France) 1972	did not enter					
(Australia) (France) (New Zealand) (United Kingdom) 1975	did not enter					
(Australia) (New Zealand) 1977	did not enter					
1985-88	did not enter					
1989-92	did not enter					
(England) 1995	did not enter					
(England) (France) (Ireland) (Wales) (Scotland) 2000	did not enter					
(Australia) 2008	Failed to Qualify					
(England) (Wales) 2013	Failed to Qualify					
(Australia) (New Zealand) (Papua New Guinea) 2017	Failed to Qualify					
(England) 2021	Failed to Qualify					
(Australia) (Papua New Guinea) 2026	Failed to Qualify					
Total	0 Titles	0/14	0	0	0	0

=== European Championship ===
European Championship record
Year**	Division	Round	Pos	Pld	W	D	L
2007	B	Champions	1st	2	2	0	0
2009	A	Fifth place	5th	2	0	0	2
2010	B	Champions	1st	2	2	0	0
2012-13	B	Third place	3rd	6	2	0	4
2014-15	B	Champions	1st	6	5	0	1
2018	B	Third place	3rd	2	1	1	0
2020	B	Champions	1st	2	2	0	0
Champions Runners-up Promoted Relegated

=== Balkans Cup ===
Balkans Cup record
Year	Round	Position	GP	W	L	D
(Serbia) 2014	Second place	2/4	2	1	1	0
(Serbia) 2017	Champions	1/3	2	2	0	0
Total	1 Titles	2/2	4	3	1	0

=== Results ===
Date	Score	Opponent	Competition	Venue	Attendance
19 October 2003	0–102	Lebanon	2003 Mediterranean Cup	Olympic Stadium, Tripoli	
22 October 2003	0–120	France	2003 Mediterranean Cup	Municipal Stadium, Beirut	
25 October 2003	4–58	Morocco	2003 Mediterranean Cup	Olympic Stadium, Tripoli	
18 June 2005	10–26	Netherlands	2005 European Nations Qualifiers	FK Radnički Novi Beograd, Belgrade	
24 July 2005	44–12	Georgia	2005 European Nations Qualifiers	Dinamo Stadium, Tbilisi	8,000
13 May 2006	10–45	Georgia	2008 World Cup Qualifying – Europe	FK Radnički Novi Beograd, Belgrade	500
4 June 2006	6–44	Russia	2008 World Cup Qualifying – Europe	FK Radnički Novi Beograd, Belgrade	500
17 June 2006	26–38	Netherlands	2008 World Cup Qualifying – Europe	, Rotterdam	250
12 August 2006	34–26	Czech Republic	2006 Slavic Cup	Ragbyove hřiště v Edenu, Prague	
7 July 2007	38–6	Germany	2007 European Shield	Fritz-Grunebaum Sportpark, Heidelberg	264
18 August 2007	56–16	Czech Republic	2007 European Shield	FK Radnički Novi Beograd, Belgrade	650
20 September 2008	4–30	Russia	2008 Euro-Med Challenge	FK Kabel, Novi Sad	500
5 October 2008	14–20	Lebanon	2008 Euro-Med Challenge	Municipal Stadium, Beirut	1,000
18 October 2009	0–82	Ireland	2009 European Cup	Spollanstown, Tullamore	295
25 October 2009	8–88	Wales	2009 European Cup	FK Smederevo Stadium, Smederevo	93
8 November 2009	14–42	Italy	2009 European Cup	Llynfi Road, Maesteg	
17 July 2010	56–4	Czech Republic	2010 European Shield – West	RK Petrovice, Prague	100
July 2010	40–14	Germany	2010 European Shield – West	FK Radnički Novi Beograd, Belgrade	300
22 April 2011	90–6	Germany		TuS Hochspeyer, Kaiserslautern	
30 September 2011	10–4	Ukraine	Milan Kosanovic Cup	Ada Ciganlija Stadium, Belgrade	
16 October 2011	4–96	Lebanon	2013 World Cup Qualifiers - Europe	Olympic Stadium, Tripoli	
23 October 2011	6–52	Italy	2013 World Cup Qualifiers - Europe	Makiš Stadium, Belgrade	
29 October 2011	28–36	Russia	2013 World Cup Qualifiers - Europe	Makiš Stadium, Belgrade	
12 May 2012	24–25	Germany	2012-13 European Shield	Fritz-Grunebaum Sportpark, Heidelberg	
6 September 2012	24–18	Italy	2012-13 European Shield	Makiš Stadium, Belgrade	600
22 September 2012	20–21	Russia	2012-13 European Shield	Nara Stadium, Naro-Fominsk	
18 May 2013	46–10	Germany	2012-13 European Shield	Makiš Stadium, Belgrade	
25 May 2013	10–24	Russia	2012-13 European Shield	Makiš Stadium, Belgrade	
14 September 2013	20–32	Italy	2012-13 European Shield	Stadio Augusteo, Este	
17 May 2014	40–14	Ukraine	2014–15 Rugby League European Championship B	Železničar Stadium, Niš	750
21 June 2014	6–20	Russia	2014–15 Rugby League European Championship B	Nara Stadium, Naro-Fominsk	
10 September 2014	45–6	Italy	2014–15 Rugby League European Championship B	Makiš Stadium, Belgrade	
17 October 2014	50–0	Hungary	2014 Balkans Cup	Makiš Stadium, Belgrade	
19 October 2014	50–22	Greece	2014 Balkans Cup	Makiš Stadium, Belgrade	
16 May 2015	20–15	Russia	2014–15 Rugby League European Championship B	Makiš Stadium, Belgrade	
22 May 2015	8–68	France		Stade Gilbert Brutus, Perpignan	
20 June 2015	21–14	Italy	2014–15 Rugby League European Championship B	Stadio comunale di Tegilo Veneto, Gemona del Friuli	
12 September 2015	64–4	Ukraine	2014–15 Rugby League European Championship B	Avanhard Stadium, Uzhhorod	
5 February 2016	12–18	Philippines		New Era Stadium, Cabramatta	
24 September 2016	64–4	Spain		Quatre Carreres, Valencia	
15 October 2016	0–50	Wales			
22 October 2016	14–62	Italy		Makiš Stadium, Belgrade	
8 October 2017	50–8	Greece		, Belgrade	
8 October 2017	50–20	Bulgaria		FC Heroj Polet, Belgrade	
13 October 2018	18–36	Russia		, Moscow	
20 October 2018	24–20	Spain		, Belgrade	
26 October 2019	0–86	Scotland		Lochinch Sports Ground, Glasgow	
9 November 2019	6–82	Greece		Makiš Stadium, Belgrade	
6 June 2021	50–4	Bosnia and Herzegovina	2021 Serbia tour of the Balkans	(Bosnia and Herzegovina) NK Rijeka, Vitez	
19 June 2021	28–16	Bulgaria	2021 Serbia tour of the Balkans	(Bulgaria) FC Trebich, Sofia	
27 June 2021	22–12	Montenegro	2021 Serbia tour of the Balkans	(Montenegro) FK Arsenal Stadium, Tivat	
4 July 2021	22–12	Albania	2021 Serbia tour of the Balkans	(Albania) Kompleksi Zmijani, Shkodër	≈100
3 October 2021	66–10	Russia	2021 European Championship B	(Serbia) City Stadium, Paraćin	≈500
9 October 2021	54–18	Ukraine	2021 European Championship B	(Serbia) FK Heroj Polet, Belgrade	≈150
13 May 2023	40–6	Greece	Friendly	(Greece) Nea Smyrni Stadium, Athens	≈1,000
27 May 2023	52–4	Italy	Friendly	(Italy) Rugby Club Pasian di Prato, Udine	
26 August 2023	28–16	Czech Republic	Friendly	(Czech Republic) Městský Stadion, Krupka	
25 September 2023	10–78	France	Friendly	(Serbia) FC Obilic, Belgrade	
14 October 2023	10–40	Netherlands	Friendly	(Netherlands) RC Zwolle, Zwolle	
17 February 2024	52–34	Montenegro	Friendly	(Serbia) Stadion u Parku, Tivat	
28 September 2024	6–52	Netherlands	Friendly	(Serbia) FC Masinac, Niš	
22 October 2024	0–48	Wales	2026 World Cup European Qualifiers	(France) Stade Albert Domec, Carcassonne	
26 October 2024	50–10	Ukraine	Friendly	(France) Stade Municipal, Saint-Estève	
25 October 2025	30–4	Netherlands	2025 Euro B	(Netherlands) RC Oysters, Oisterwijk	
1 November 2025	52–12	Malta	2025 Euro B	(Serbia) FK BSK Borča, Belgrade	
18 October 2026	14–30	Ukraine	2026 Euro B	(Serbia) FK Zemun Stadium, Belgrade	
24 October 2026	30–38	Netherlands	2026 Euro B	(Serbia) FK Zemun Stadium, Belgrade	

== IRL Rankings ==
IRL Men's World Rankings
Official rankings as of August 2026
Rank	Change	Team	Pts %
1	Steady	Australia	100
2	Steady	New Zealand	82
3	Steady	England	70
4	Steady	Samoa	56
5	Steady	Tonga	54
6	Steady	Papua New Guinea	47
7	Steady	Fiji	34
8	▲1	Cook Islands	24
9	▲2	Netherlands	23
10	▲2	Ukraine	21
11	▼3	France	21
12	▼2	Serbia	20
13	Steady	Wales	18
14	Steady	Ireland	17
15	Steady	Greece	14
16	Steady	Malta	14
17	▲12	Canada	13
18	▼1	Italy	11
19	▼1	Jamaica	9
20	▲7	Scotland	8
21	▲1	United States	8
22	▼3	Poland	7
23	▼3	Lebanon	7
24	▼1	Germany	7
25	▼1	Czech Republic	6
26	▼5	Norway	6
27	▼2	Chile	5
28	▲2	Philippines	5
29	▼1	South Africa	4
30	Steady	Brazil	3
31	Steady	Morocco	3
32	▲1	Argentina	3
33	▲2	Ghana	2
34	▲2	Kenya	2
35	▼1	Montenegro	2
36	▲1	Nigeria	2
37	▼5	North Macedonia	1
38	Steady	Albania	1
39	Steady	Turkey	1
40	Steady	Bulgaria	1
41	Steady	Cameroon	0
42	Steady	Japan	0
43	Steady	Spain	0
44	Steady	Colombia	0
45	Steady	Russia	0
46	Steady	El Salvador	0
47	Steady	Bosnia and Herzegovina	0
48	Steady	Hong Kong	0
49	Steady	Solomon Islands	0
50	Steady	Vanuatu	0
51	Steady	Hungary	0
52	Steady	Latvia	0
53	Steady	Denmark	0
54	Steady	Belgium	0
55	Steady	Estonia	0
56	Steady	Sweden	0
57	Steady	Niue	0
Complete rankings at www.internationalrugbyleague.com

== See also ==
- Rugby league in Serbia
