= Russia national rugby league team =

Russia

Team information
- Nickname: The Bears
- Governing body: Russian Rugby League
- Region: Europe
- Head coach: Denis Korolev
- Captain: Sergey Konstantinov
- Home stadium: Naro-Fominsk
- IRL ranking: 45th

Uniforms
First colours

Team results
- First international
- France 26–6 USSR (Soviet Union) (Villeurbanne, France; September 1991)
- Biggest win
- Lebanon 0–80 Russia (Moscow, Russia; 28 September 2008)
- Biggest defeat
- Australia 110–4 Russia (Hull, England; 4 November 2000)
- World Cup
- Appearances: 1 (first time in 2000)
- Best result: Group Stages, 2000

The Russia national rugby league team, nicknamed The Bears (Russian: Медведи), represents Russia in international rugby league tournaments and other rugby league fixtures.

The national team formed in 1991, with their first international against France a few months later. The team, under the governance of the Russian Rugby League Federation gained observer status with the Rugby League International Federation in 1993, before being promoted to affiliate member ahead of the 2000 Rugby League World Cup and gaining full membership a three years later.

In 2010, Russia was expelled for a series of rule breaches and readmitted under the Association of Rugby League Clubs, they regained full member status three years later. After the 2022 Russian invasion of Ukraine, the International Rugby League and European Rugby League suspended Russia's membership thus preventing them from competing in all international rugby league competitions. They were later downgrade to affiliate status.

== History ==
=== 1990s ===
The Russia Bears were formed in 1991 for a tour of two English teams, the York Wasps and Fulham RLFC. The Bears played their first overseas match in 1991 against the French national team at the Stade Georges Lyvet, Villeurbanne on Sunday, 27 October 1991. The Bears were beaten 26-6 by France. Later that year, the Bears toured South Africa to play a three-match series against South Africa. The following year, the team participated in the 1995 Rugby League Emerging Nations World Championship.

=== 2000s ===
Russia gained affiliate member status with the Rugby League International Federation in 2000 allowing them automatic qualification to the expanded 2000 Rugby League World Cup. Russia was drawn into a group with Australia, England, and Fiji, and were captained by Sydney Roosters prop Ian Rubin, who was born in Odesa, Soviet Union. Rubin was one of two NRL experienced players in the world cup squad; the other being Robert Campbell who had played for Gold Coast Chargers. Russia lost all three group games, losing their opener to Fiji in Barrow-in-Furness 38–12, before back to back defeats in Kingston-upon-Hull to England and Australia, 76–4 and 110–4 respectively. The latter of these results is the largest defeat in test rugby league.

In 2002, Russia hosted the United States in a test match at the Luzhniki Stadium in front of 30,000 spectators.

The Russian side went on a four-match tour of New Zealand's south island in 2004.

In 2006, Russia were involved in Europe Round One, defeating Netherlands national rugby league team and Serbia national rugby league team to finish second and keep their World Cup dream alive. They then went through to Europe Round Two in Europe Pool Two with Ireland and Lebanon. Russia lost all 4 games against them and did not qualify on those grounds.

=== 2010s ===
In 2010, after a year out of competition, the Bears competed in the Rugby League European Shield, topping the table after wins against Ukraine and Latvia. In 2011 Russia were involved in the European qualifying group that featured Russia themselves, Italy, Serbia, and Lebanon. They lost both of their games against Italy and Lebanon ultimately ending their dreams for a second world cup tournament. In 2012-2013, the Bears competed in the Rugby League European Shield winning five games out of six to take the shield.

Russia participated in the qualification for the 2017 Rugby League World Cup. In the final round of qualification, Russia took on Spain at Fili Stadium in Moscow, and Ireland in Bray, in a bid to qualify for their second World Cup appearance.

=== 2020s ===
After the 2022 Russian invasion of Ukraine, the International Rugby League and European Rugby League banned Russia from all international rugby league competitions.

== Competitive records ==
IRL Men's World Rankings
Official rankings as of August 2026
| Rank | Change | Team | Pts % |
| 1 | Steady | Australia | 100 |
| 2 | Steady | New Zealand | 82 |
| 3 | Steady | England | 70 |
| 4 | Steady | Samoa | 56 |
| 5 | Steady | Tonga | 54 |
| 6 | Steady | Papua New Guinea | 47 |
| 7 | Steady | Fiji | 34 |
| 8 | ▲1 | Cook Islands | 24 |
| 9 | ▲2 | Netherlands | 23 |
| 10 | ▲2 | Ukraine | 21 |
| 11 | ▼3 | France | 21 |
| 12 | ▼2 | Serbia | 20 |
| 13 | Steady | Wales | 18 |
| 14 | Steady | Ireland | 17 |
| 15 | Steady | Greece | 14 |
| 16 | Steady | Malta | 14 |
| 17 | ▲12 | Canada | 13 |
| 18 | ▼1 | Italy | 11 |
| 19 | ▼1 | Jamaica | 9 |
| 20 | ▲7 | Scotland | 8 |
| 21 | ▲1 | United States | 8 |
| 22 | ▼3 | Poland | 7 |
| 23 | ▼3 | Lebanon | 7 |
| 24 | ▼1 | Germany | 7 |
| 25 | ▼1 | Czech Republic | 6 |
| 26 | ▼5 | Norway | 6 |
| 27 | ▼2 | Chile | 5 |
| 28 | ▲2 | Philippines | 5 |
| 29 | ▼1 | South Africa | 4 |
| 30 | Steady | Brazil | 3 |
| 31 | Steady | Morocco | 3 |
| 32 | ▲1 | Argentina | 3 |
| 33 | ▲2 | Ghana | 2 |
| 34 | ▲2 | Kenya | 2 |
| 35 | ▼1 | Montenegro | 2 |
| 36 | ▲1 | Nigeria | 2 |
| 37 | ▼5 | North Macedonia | 1 |
| 38 | Steady | Albania | 1 |
| 39 | Steady | Turkey | 1 |
| 40 | Steady | Bulgaria | 1 |
| 41 | Steady | Cameroon | 0 |
| 42 | Steady | Japan | 0 |
| 43 | Steady | Spain | 0 |
| 44 | Steady | Colombia | 0 |
| 45 | Steady | Russia | 0 |
| 46 | Steady | El Salvador | 0 |
| 47 | Steady | Bosnia and Herzegovina | 0 |
| 48 | Steady | Hong Kong | 0 |
| 49 | Steady | Solomon Islands | 0 |
| 50 | Steady | Vanuatu | 0 |
| 51 | Steady | Hungary | 0 |
| 52 | Steady | Latvia | 0 |
| 53 | Steady | Denmark | 0 |
| 54 | Steady | Belgium | 0 |
| 55 | Steady | Estonia | 0 |
| 56 | Steady | Sweden | 0 |
| 57 | Steady | Niue | 0 |
Complete rankings at www.internationalrugbyleague.com

=== Overall ===
Below is table of the official representative rugby league matches played by Russia at test level up until 6 October 2021:

| Team | First Played | Played | Win | Draw | Loss | Last Meeting |
|---|---|---|---|---|---|---|
| Australia | 2000 | 1 | 0 | 0 | 1 | 2000 |
| Cook Islands | 1995 | 1 | 0 | 0 | 1 | 1995 |
| England | 2000 | 3 | 0 | 0 | 3 | 2004 |
| France | 1991 | 8 | 0 | 0 | 8 | 2005 |
| Fiji | 2000 | 1 | 0 | 0 | 1 | 2000 |
| Germany | 2012 | 2 | 2 | 0 | 0 | 2013 |
| Georgia | 2008 | 2 | 2 | 0 | 0 | 2008 |
| Ireland | 2004 | 4 | 1 | 0 | 3 | 2016 |
| Italy | 2011 | 6 | 2 | 0 | 4 | 2016 |
| Latvia | 2010 | 1 | 1 | 0 | 0 | 2010 |
| Lebanon | 2006 | 3 | 1 | 0 | 2 | 2008 |
| Netherlands | 2006 | 1 | 1 | 0 | 0 | 2006 |
| Scotland | 1995 | 1 | 0 | 0 | 1 | 1992 |
| Serbia | 2006 | 8 | 6 | 0 | 2 | 2021 |
| South Africa | 1992 | 2 | 2 | 0 | 0 | 1992 |
| Spain | 2016 | 2 | 2 | 0 | 0 | 2018 |
| Ukraine | 2010 | 5 | 4 | 0 | 1 | 2021 |
| United States | 1994 | 5 | 5 | 0 | 0 | 2004 |
| Wales | 2003 | 1 | 0 | 0 | 1 | 2003 |
| Total | 1992 | 41 | 26 | 0 | 14 | |

== See also ==
- Rugby league in Russia
- European Nations Cup
- Emerging Nations Tournament
- World Cup
