= Makiš Stadium =

Football stadium in Belgrade, Serbia

Coordinates: 44°45′54.56″N 20°28′19.75″E

- Interactive map of Makiš Stadium
- Full name: Makiš Stadium
- Location: Čukarica, Belgrade, Serbia
- Owner: Ministry of Internal Affairs (Serbia)
- Operator: Milicionar
- Capacity: 4,000
- Surface: Grass

Tenants
- Serbia national rugby league team Milicionar

Makiš Stadium is the home ground of Milicionar. It's also known simply as Milicionar Stadium. The all-seated stadium was named after Makiš forest. The stadium has a seating capacity for around 4,000. Since 2011 Rugby League World Cup qualifications tournament, Serbia national rugby league team use this stadium as its home ground.

== See also ==
- List of stadiums in Serbia
