= International rugby league in 2021 =

A list of men and women international rugby league matches played throughout 2021 and does not include wheelchair rugby league international matches. A † denotes a recognised, but unofficial match that did not contribute to the IRL World Rankings.

Due to the COVID-19 pandemic, the European Championship B, European Championship C, European Championship D and Americas Championship were all initially postponed until 2021, however all were eventually abandoned except for the European Championship B and European Championship D due to travel restrictions.

2021 Rugby League World Cup was also postponed until 2022 due to Australia and New Zealand pulling out months before the tournament was scheduled to commence.

== Season overview ==
Men's international tours
Start date	Touring side	Region	Results [Matches]
6 June 2021	Serbia	Balkans	4–0 [4]
Men's international friendlies
Start date	Home team	Away team	Winners
28 February 2021	Brazil	Uruguay	Brazil
6 March 2021	Peru	El Salvador	El Salvador
13 June 2021	Brazil	Philippines	Philippines
2 October 2021	Germany	Netherlands	Netherlands
23 October 2021	France	England	England
24 October 2021	Jamaica	Scotland	Draw
19 December 2021	North Macedonia	Vietnam	North Macedonia
Men's international tournaments
Start date	Tournament		Winners
3 October 2021	(Serbia) European Championship B		Serbia
14 October 2021	(Turkey) European Championship D		Netherlands

Women's international tours
Start date	Touring side	Region	Results [Matches]
No international women's tours in 2021
Women's international friendlies
Start date	Home team	Away team	Winners
25 June 2021	England	Wales	England
17 October 2021	Wales	Ireland	Ireland
23 October 2021	France	England	England
Women's international tournaments
Start date	Tournament		Winners
No international women's tournaments in 2021

== Rankings ==
The following were the rankings at the beginning of the season.

IRL Men's World Rankings
Official rankings as of 18 November 2019
Rank	Change	Team	Points %
1	▲2	New Zealand	100.00%
2	▼1	Australia	91.82%
3	▼1	England	85.34%
4	Steady	Tonga	60.66%
5	Steady	Fiji	36.57%
6	▲4	Papua New Guinea	28.53%
7	Steady	Samoa	22.09%
8	▼2	France	16.69%
9	▼1	Scotland	15.00%
10	▼1	Lebanon	11.81%
11	▲5	Greece	11.38%
12	Steady	Ireland	11.36%
13	▲1	Italy	7.86%
14	▼3	Wales	7.75%
15	▲4	Serbia	0.00%
16	▲1	Malta	6.77%
17	▲1	Norway	5.63%
18	▼3	United States	5.39%
19	▲4	Poland	5.35%
20	▼7	Jamaica	5.04%
21	▼1	Hungary	4.27%
22	▲3	Czech Republic	4.16%
23	▲5	Cook Islands	3.87%
24	▲7	Turkey	3.51%
25	▼1	Netherlands	3.29%
26	▲4	Spain	3.18%
27	▼6	Canada	2.81%
28	New entry	Nigeria	2.51%
29	▼2	Solomon Islands	2.32%
30	▲10	Sweden	2.16%
31	▲4	Germany	1.95%
32	▲1	Chile	1.86%
33	New entry	Ghana	1.80%
34	▲16	Morocco	1.69%
35	▼3	Vanuatu	1.47%
36	Steady	South Africa	1.46%
37	▼8	Russia	1.41%
38	New entry	Cameroon	1.31%
39	▼2	Ukraine	1.21%
40	▲1	Colombia	1.06%
41	▲4	Brazil	0.50%
42	Steady	Belgium	0.30%
43	▲4	Denmark	0.13%
44	▲4	Bulgaria	0.10%
45	▲4	Latvia	0.07%
*Change from July 2019
Complete rankings at INTRL.SPORT

IRL Women's World Rankings
Official rankings as of 18 November 2019
Rank	Change	Team	Points %
1	Steady	Australia	
2	Steady	New Zealand	
3	Steady	England	
4	▲2	Papua New Guinea	
5	▼1	Canada	
6	▼1	France	
7	▼2	Cook Islands	
8	Steady	Italy	
9	New entry	Serbia	
10	New entry	Fiji	
11	New entry	Turkey	
12	New entry	Samoa	
13	New entry	Brazil	
14	▼6	Lebanon	
15	New entry	Greece	
*Change from July 2019
Complete rankings at INTRL.SPORT

== February ==
=== Brazil men vs Uruguay in Australia ===
28 February 2021

Brazil	60 – 0	Uruguay
Tries: Nunes (3), Fleury (2), Campina, Levy, De Araujo, Hilberto, Jackson, Ricau; Goals: Nunes (8/11)

Hillier Oval, Sydney
Attendance: 300
Referee: Logan Neilsen (Australia)

== March ==
=== Peru men vs El Salvador in Australia ===
6 March 2021
19:30 AEDT (UTC+11:00)

Peru	10 – 18	El Salvador
Tries: Sommers (2); Goals: Altamirano (1/1), Parker (0/1)		Tries: Kiwi Kiwi (2), Orellano, Maatouk; Goals: Fernandez (1/3), Maatouk (0/1)

Waminda Oval, Sydney
Attendance: 513
Referee: Matt Middleton (Australia)

== April ==
=== Turkey men vs Australian Defence Force ===
Gallipoli Cup

25 April 2021
13:50 AEST (UTC+10:00)

Australian Defence Force	46 – 0†	Turkey
Tries: Simington (2), Tabuai (2), Mason, McGregor, Munro, Rutley, Walton; Goals: Munro (4/7), Walton (1/2)	Report (NRL)

Sydney Cricket Ground, Sydney

Notes:

- This match was a curtain raiser to an NRL fixture between the Sydney Roosters and the St. George Illawarra Dragons.

== June ==
=== Serbia men tour of the Balkans ===
6 June 2021
14:00 CEST (UTC+2:00)

Bosnia and Herzegovina	4 – 50	Serbia
Tries: Banovic; Goals: Ljubanic (0/1)	Report (IRL); Report (ERL); Report (SRL)	Tries: Krnjeta (2), Nedeljkovic (2), Marinkovic, Jevdjic, Ilic, Popovic, Bibic; Goals: Stojilkovic (6/7), Bibic (1/2)

NK Rijeka, Vitez
Referee: Slobodan Manak (Serbia)

19 June 2021
14:00 CEST (UTC+2:00)

Bulgaria	16 – 28	Serbia
Tries: Ivanov, Debreliev, Kostadinov; Goals: Rasol (2/3)	Report (IRL); Report (ERL); Report (SRL)	Tries: Ilic (2), Mladenovic (2), Krnjeta; Goals: Stojiljkovic (4/6)

FC Trebich, Sofia
Referee: Slobodan Manak (Serbia)

27 June 2021
18:30 CEST (UTC+2:00)

Montenegro	16 – 24	Serbia
Tries: Kusic (3); Goals: Popovic (2/3)	Report (IRL); Report (ERL); Report (SRL)	Tries: Zivojinovic (2), Krnjeta (2), Bibic; Goals: Arnold (2/2), Bibic (0/2), Djordjevic (0/1)

FK Arsenal Stadium, Tivat
Referee: Slobodan Manak (Serbia)

4 July 2021
14:00 CEST (UTC+2:00)

Albania	12 – 22	Serbia
Tries: Cela, Tushaj; Goals: Gucaj (2/2)	Report (SRL)	Tries: Jevdjić (2), Arnold, Živojinović; Goals: Simovic (3/4)

Kompleksi Zmijani, Shkodra
Attendance: 100
Referee: Slobodan Manak (Serbia)

=== Brazil men vs Philippines in Australia ===
Magellan Cup

13 June 2021
15:00 AEST (UTC+10:00)

Brazil	8 – 40	Philippines
Tries: Guzzo (2)	Report	Tries: Tootell (2), Stephenson, Cartwright, Sheedy, Jones, Phillips, Godfrey; Goals: Russell (3), Cartwright

Kensington Oval, Sydney

=== England women vs Wales ===
25 June 2021
18:00 BST (UTC+01:00)

England	60 – 0	Wales
Tries: Rudge (2), Roberts, Jones, Cunningham, Hoyle, Goldthorp, Roche, Beevers, Wilson, Dodd; Goals: Stanley (6/7), Stott (2/4)	Report (ERL); Report (RFL); Highlights

Halliwell Jones Stadium, Warrington
Attendance: ≈4,000
Referee: Aaron Moore (England)

=== England vs Combined Nations All Stars ===
25 June 2021
20:15 BST (UTC+01:00)

England	24 – 26†	Combined Nations All Stars
Tries: Farrell (2), Knowles, Davies; Goals: Ratchford (4/4)	Report (Sky Sports); Report (BBC)	Tries: Sio (2), Mata'utia, McGillvary; Goals: Sezer (5/6)

Halliwell Jones Stadium, Warrington
Attendance: ≈4,000
Referee: James Child (England)

== October ==
=== Griffin Cup ===
Griffin Cup

2 October 2021
16:00 CEST (UTC+2:00)

Germany	16 – 48	Netherlands
Tries: Amefia, Heinrichsen, Ngondi; Goals: Amefia (1/1), Doughton (1/1), Seelweger (0/1)	Report	Tries: Schoenmaker (3), Schultz (2), Dirkzwager, Ngirubiu, Longhurst, Neves, Wilce; Goals: Idzerda (3/5), Thomson (1/4)

Düsseldorf Rugby Club, Düsseldorf
Referee: Moray Gilland (Belgium)

=== European Championship B ===
Pos	Team	Pld	W	D	L	PF	PA	PD	Pts	Qualification
1	Serbia	2	2	0	0	120	28	+92	4	Promotion to Euro A
2	Ukraine	2	1	0	1	114	72	+42	2	
3	Russia	2	0	0	2	28	162	−134	0	

Source: ERL

3 October 2021
14:00 CEST (UTC+2:00)

Serbia	66–10	Russia
Tries: Djordjević (3), Arsić (2), Vl. Dedić (2), Pavlović (2), Bibić, Djurić, D. Janković, Trifunović; Goals: Jašari (7/13)	Report (IRL); Report (ERL); Report (SRL)	Tries: Egorov, Sazonov; Goals: Vabishchevich (1/2)

City Stadium, Paraćin
Attendance: ≈500
Referee: Stephane Vincent (France)

6 October 2021
13:00 CEST (UTC+2:00)

Russia	18–96	Ukraine
Tries: Chuprin, Troitskii, Vabishchevich; Goals: Vabishchevich (3/3)	Report (IRL); Report (ERL)	Tries: Skorbach (4), Adamyk (2), Hrankovskyi (2), Kolesnik (2), Kozak (2), Trusov (2), Beznoshchuk, Puchkov, Shcherbyna, Troyan; Goals: Skorbach (12/17), Beznoshchuk (0/1)

FK Heroj Polet, Belgrade
Referee: James Jones (Wales)

9 October 2021
14:00 CEST (UTC+2:00)

Ukraine	18–54	Serbia
Tries: Hrankovskyi (2), Shcherbyna; Goals: Skorbach (3/3)	Report (IRL); Report (ERL)	Tries: Trifunović (3), Milutinović (3), Arsić, Vl. Dedić, Stevanović, Zogović; Goals: Jašari (7/10), Vo. Dedić (0/1)

FK Heroj Polet, Belgrade
Attendance: ≈150
Referee: Andrew Pilkington (Spain)

=== European Championship D ===
First semi-final

14 October 2021
13:00 CET (UTC+1:00)

Malta	16–40	Czech Republic
Tries: Scholey, Barlogio, Galea; Goals: Galea (2/3)	Report (IRL); Report (ERL)	Tries: Bělohlávek, Preininger, Řičica (2), Hudrlík (2), Horák; Goals: Hudrlík (6/7)

Huseyin Akar Tesisler Stadium, Bodrum
Attendance: 500
Referee: Aris Dardamanis (Greece)

Second semi-final

14 October 2021
15:30 CET (UTC+1:00)

Netherlands	40–18	Turkey
Tries: Shoenmake (2), Ngirubiu, Farrell (2), Renac; Goals: Idzera (8/8)	Report (IRL); Report (ERL)	Tries: Demir, Ertürk, Çeliktutan; Goals: Bayram (3/3)

Huseyin Akar Tesisler Stadium, Bodrum
Attendance: 500
Referee: Eamonn Whelan (Ireland)

Third-place play-off

17 October 2021
13:00 CET (UTC+1:00)

Malta	12–36	Turkey
Tries: Zammit, Cutajar; Goals: Galea (2/2)	Report (IRL); Report (ERL)	Tries: Demir, Işik, Çeliktutan, Bayram, Balçin, Tayyar Berktav, Tirendez; Goals: Bayram (4/7)

Huseyin Akar Tesisler Stadium, Bodrum
Referee: Jarda Bzoch (Czechia)

Championship final (Note: Netherlands promoted to the 2023 European Championship B as well as progressing to the qualifying tournament for the 2025 Rugby League World Cup.)

17 October 2021
15:30 CET (UTC+1:00)

Czech Republic	10–36	Netherlands
Tries: Veselý, Kasík; Goals: Veselý (1/2)	Report (IRL); Report (ERL)	Tries: Schoenmaker (3), Lavia, Razoux Schultz, De Ruiter; Goals: Idzera (6/9)

Huseyin Akar Tesisler Stadium, Bodrum
Referee: Eamonn Whelan (Ireland)

=== England Knights vs Jamaica ===
15 October 2021
19:00 BST (UTC+1:00)

Jamaica	4 – 56†	England Knights
Tries: Jones-Bishop	Report (ERL); Report (RFL)	Tries: Broadbent (2), Walker, Pryce, Smith (2), Longstaff, Ashton (2), Wrench; Goals: Pryce (7)

Mend-A-Hose Jungle, Castleford
Attendance: ≈2,250
Referee: James Child (England)

=== Wales women vs Ireland ===
17 October 2021
15:00 BST (UTC+1:00)

Wales	24 – 26	Ireland
Tries: Lewis (3), Norkett (2), Michael; Goals: Lewis (0/5), Salter (0/1)	Report (ERL); Report (RFL); Highlights	Tries: Lambert, Greenwood, Cobain, McGuinness, Dunne; Goals: Pua (2/3), McGuinness (1/1), Birchall (0/1)

Stadiwm Zip World, Colwyn Bay
Referee: Luke Fenton (Scotland)

=== France vs England double header ===
Women's

23 October 2021
13:00 CEST (UTC+2:00)

France	4 – 40	England
Tries: Bianchini; Goals: Ciria (0/1)	Report (ERL); Report (RFL); Video Replay; Highlights	Tries: Rudge (2), Hardcastle, Whitfield, Cunningham, Stanley, Beevers; Goals: Stanley (5/6), Stott (1/1)

Stade Gilbert Brutus, Perpignan
Attendance: ≈2,000
Referee: Andrew Pilkington

Men's

23 October 2021
15:30 CEST (UTC+2:00)

France	10 – 30	England
Tries: Le Cam, Sangaré; Goals: Kheirallah (1/2)	Report (ERL); Report (RFL)	Tries: Makinson (2), Bateman (2), Farrell, Davies; Goals: Abdull (3/6)

Stade Gilbert Brutus, Perpignan
Attendance: ≈5,500
Referee: Ben Casty (France)

=== Jamaica men vs Scotland in England ===
24 October 2021
15:00 BST (UTC+1:00)

Jamaica	30 – 30	Scotland
Tries: Jones Bishop (2), Coleman, J. Brown, Andrade, A. Brown; Goals: Farrell (3/5)	Report (IRL); Report (ERL)	Tries: Emslie (2), Oakes, Hellewell, Ferguson; Goals: Walmsley (5/5)

Millennium Stadium, Featherstone
Referee: James Jones (Wales)

== December ==
=== North Macedonia men vs Vietnam in Australia ===
19 December 2021
15:00 AEDT (UTC+11:00)

North Macedonia	58 – 0	Vietnam

Leichhardt Oval, Sydney

== See also ==
- Impact of the COVID-19 pandemic on rugby league
