= Latino Rugby League Sevens =

- Current season or competition: 2015 Latino Rugby League Sevens
- Sport: Rugby league
- Instituted: 2015
- Inaugural season: 2015
- Number of teams: 6
- Country: International (RLIF)
- Holders: Chile (2015)
- Broadcast partner: Fox Sports (AU); Sky Sports (NZ)

Latino Rugby League Sevens is a Rugby league sevens tournament held annually in Cabramatta, New South Wales, Australia. It was first held in 2015.

== Clubs and teams ==
The clubs that competed in the Latino Rugby League Sevens

- Chile
- Colombia
- Ecuador
- El Salvador
- Peru
- Uruguay

== Results ==
- Pool A

Chile 34 d El Salvador 20

Chile 20 d Uruguay 4

El Salvador 22 d Uruguay 14

- Pool B

Peru 28 d Ecuador 0

Peru 12 d Colombia 4

Ecuador 18 d Colombia 8

- GYG Latino Sevens Final

Chile 14 d Peru 10 (Halftime 10-all)
