= Ecuador national rugby league team =

Rugby team

Ecuador
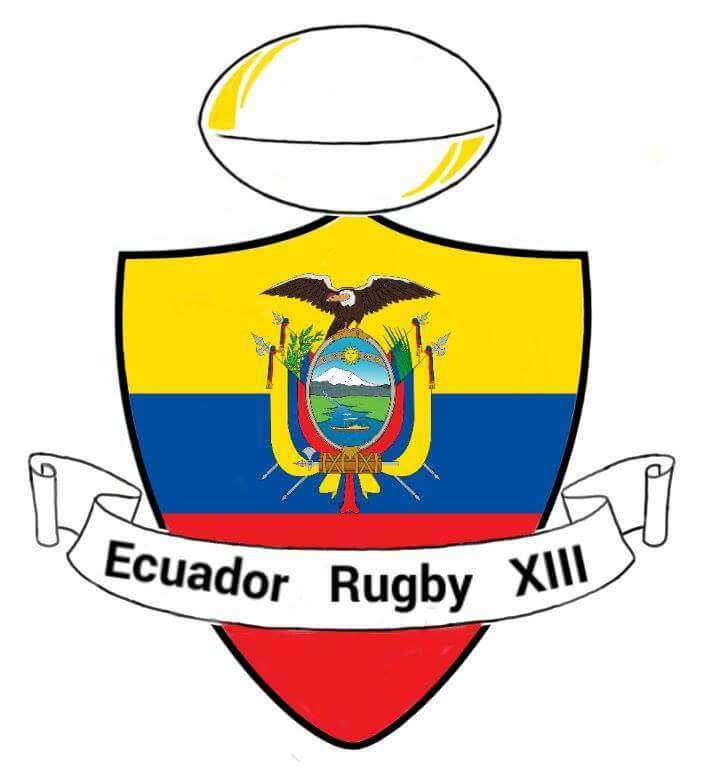

Team information
- Nickname: -
- Governing body: Asia-Pacific Rugby League Confederation
- Region: -
- Head coach: Byron Serrano
- Captain: Jeff Lopez & Rodney Garcia
- Most caps: -
- Top try-scorer: Sebastian Jacome (3 tries)
- Top point-scorer: Sebastian Jacome (12 points)
- IRL ranking: N/Ath

Uniforms
First colours

Team results
- First international
- vs Peru (Latino Rugby League Sevens)
- Biggest win
- vs Colombia (Ecuador 16 d Colombia 4)
- Biggest defeat
- vs Peru (Peru 28 d Ecuador 0)
- World Cup
- Appearances: (first time in -)
- Best result: -

The Ecuador national rugby league team (Spanish: rugby league equipo nacional de Ecuador) represents Ecuador in rugby league. They made their debut at the first ever Latino Sevens on 17 October 2015 against Peru.

== History ==
The sport of rugby league is at its inception and earliest stage of growth in Ecuador. However, efforts are being put in place to increase the exposure and participation of rugby league in Central and South America through the Latin Heat Rugby League.

In April 2015, Latin Heat volunteer and ambassador Matthew Brown created a Facebook page called "Ecuador Rugby XIII" to help create interest in starting Rugby League in Ecuador. He also lived in the country for 6 months.

While there, he helped create a partnership between Touch Rugby Ecuador and Ecuador Rugby XIII. Touch Rugby Ecuador is an organisation (mainly made up of expats from Rugby nations living in Quito, Ecuador) that plays social games of Touch Rugby every Saturday at Carolina Park. The basic idea behind combining the two organisations was that Rugby is quite small in Ecuador, and working together would encourage native Ecuadorians to try both forms of rugby.

Later, Brown met with Fenrir Rodriguez, who was interested in helping start the Ecuador Rugby XIII. The Latin Heat were able to recruit enough Ecuadorian players, and on 17 October 2015, the newly established Ecuadorian rugby league team competed in its first international competition - The Latino Rugby League Sevens at New Era Stadium, Cabramatta.

Other Latin nations such as Mexico, Brazil and Argentina already play the sport and along with other efforts to start the game up in countries such as El Salvador, Haiti, Colombia, Uruguay, Chile and Peru, it is hoped that Ecuador can learn from their neighbours and receive support while attempting to further Rugby League on home soil.

== Inaugural Team 2015 ==
The following is the Ecuadorian teamed named for the 2015 Latino Sevens.

Scott Correa,

Rodney Garcia (Co-Captain),

Andres Garzon,

Frank Jacome,

Sebastian Jacome,

Jeff Lopez (Co-Captain),

Dahcell Ramos-Malo,

Geovanny Sanchez,

Sandro Sanchez,

Roberto Tacuri,

Juan Torres,

Johnny Vasco

== Players for Ecuador to date ==
Scott Correa, Rodney Garcia (Co-Captain), Andres Garzon, William Gomez, Frank Jacome, Sebastian Jacome, Johnny Liszka, Jeff Lopez (Co-Captain), Dahcell Ramos-Malo, Jay Palese, Johnny Pandilla, Geovanny Sanchez, Sandro Sanchez, Edgar Santamaria, Roberto Tacuri, Juan Torres, Johnny Vasco

== Results ==
=== Latino Rugby League Sevens Tournament, New Era Stadium (17/10/2015) ===
Peru vs Ecuador

Peru 28 (Jacob Parker 2, James Goncalves 2, Aaron Perez tries; J Goncalves 2, J Parker, A Perez goals) defeat Ecuador 0. Halftime score: Peru 16-0.

Ecuador vs Colombia

Ecuador 18 (Johnny Vasco 2, Sebastian Jacome, Roberto Tacuri tries; Rodney Garcia goal) defeat Colombia 8 (Sebastian Maya Jimenez, Andres Marino Silva tries). Halftime score: 4-4.

=== Sevens Match "El Escudo del Sur", Henson Oval (11/06/2016) ===
Ecuador vs Colombia

Game 1 Ecuador 16 (Jay Pelese 2, Sebastian Jacome 2 tries) defeat Colombia 4 (Norman Lizano try).

Game 2 Colombia 14 (Miguel Henao Velez, Sebastian Maya Jimenez, Norman Lizano tries; Diego Vejerano goal) defeat Ecuador 8 (Johnny Liszka, Edgar Santamaria tries).

Aggregate: ECUADOR 24 defeat COLOMBIA 18.
