= Rugby player =

Rugby player can refer to:

- A player of rugby union
  - A player of rugby sevens
- A player of rugby league
  - A player of rugby league sevens
  - A player of rugby league nines
- A player of both codes of rugby football
- A player of wheelchair rugby

== See also ==
- Category:Rugby union players
- Category:rugby league players
- Category:Wheelchair rugby players
