= Cabramatta International Nines =

International rugby tournament in Australia

- Current season or competition: 2020 Cabramatta International Nines
- Sport: Rugby league
- Instituted: 2003
- Inaugural season: 2003
- Number of teams: 30
- Country: International (RLIF)
- Current Champions: Cook Islands (2019)
- Broadcast partner: Online

Cabramatta International Nines is a rugby league nines tournament held annually in Cabramatta, New South Wales, Australia. It was first held in 2003. The 2020 will be broadcast online by The81stMinute Call Team on steelesports.com.au with video streaming through the Cabramatta Facebook page. This will be the fourth time The81stMinute Call Team has broadcast the Nines.

== Clubs and Teams ==
Some of the Clubs and Teams to compete in the Cabramatta International Nines

- Asquith Magpies
- American Samoa national rugby league team
- Australian Aboriginal rugby league team
- Balmain Ryde-Eastwood Tigers
- Banty Roosters
- Blacktown Workers
- Cabramatta Two Blues
- Canada national rugby league team
- Chile national rugby league team
- Cook Islands national rugby league team
- Copenhagen RLFC
- East Campbelltown Eagles
- El Salvador national rugby league team
- Fiji national rugby league team
- Greece national rugby league team
- Guildford Owls
- Helensburgh Tigers
- Jamaica national rugby league team
- Japan national rugby league team
- Kingsgrove Colts
- La Perouse United
- Latin Heat Rugby League
- Malta national rugby league team
- Mount Pritchard Mounties
- Narellan Jets
- Niue national rugby league team
- Papua New Guinea national rugby league team
- Philippines national rugby league team
- Portugal national rugby league team
- Samoa national rugby league team
- Thailand national rugby league team
- The Entrance Tigers
- Vanuatu national rugby league team
- Western Suburbs Magpies

== Rules ==
There are a number of rule variations that are implemented to ensure the games are faster and to ensure fewer delays and stoppages.

The major Rule changes that differ from regular NRL games are:

- Two nine-minute halves with a two-minute half time period.
- Nine players a side with five unlimited interchange players (six interchanges in 2014).
- Scrums are only formed after a double knock on, with attacking teams electing which side to feed the ball.
- No video referee, with one on-field referee, two touch judges and two in-goal judges.
- Five minute golden try period in qualifying rounds with the match deemed a draw if there is no score, while unlimited golden try for the finals.
- A tap restart takes place after a 40/20.
- Five points for a try scored in the bonus zone under the posts, with two point drop kick conversion attempts.
- The scoring team will have a dropkick off to restart play.
- Three minute sin bins (Five in 2014).
- Five tackles in a set.

== Results ==
=== 2011 ===
On the 5th of February the International 9's tournament was played at New Era Stadium, Cabramatta.

- Plate Grand Final: Macarthur Brothers 28 def Japan 12.
- Trophy Grand Final: Mounties 22 def Bankstown 10.
- Cup Grand Final: Balmain Ryde-Eastwood Tigers 6 def Fiji 4.

=== 2012 ===
Indigenous Australia defeated Vanuatu 17-12 in the Trophy Grand Final. And were undefeated throughout the tournament. Ash Kris of Indigenous Australia was the Top Try Scorer of the tournament with 7 tries in 5 games. Hughie Stanley of the Indigenous Australia was the Top Point Scorer with 34 points, 5 tries and 7 goals. Former NRL player Yileen Gordon captained the Indigenous Australia.

=== 2016 ===
The 2016 edition of the tournament was cancelled due to severe thunderstorm over the New Era Stadium the venue of the games. 3 games of the round robin round was played before the cancellation.
