= Portugal national rugby team =

Portugal national rugby team may refer to:

- Portugal national rugby union team
- Portugal women's national rugby union team
  - Portugal national rugby sevens team
  - Portugal women's national rugby union team (sevens)
- Portugal national rugby league team
