= Isaac De Gois =

Portugal international rugby league footballer

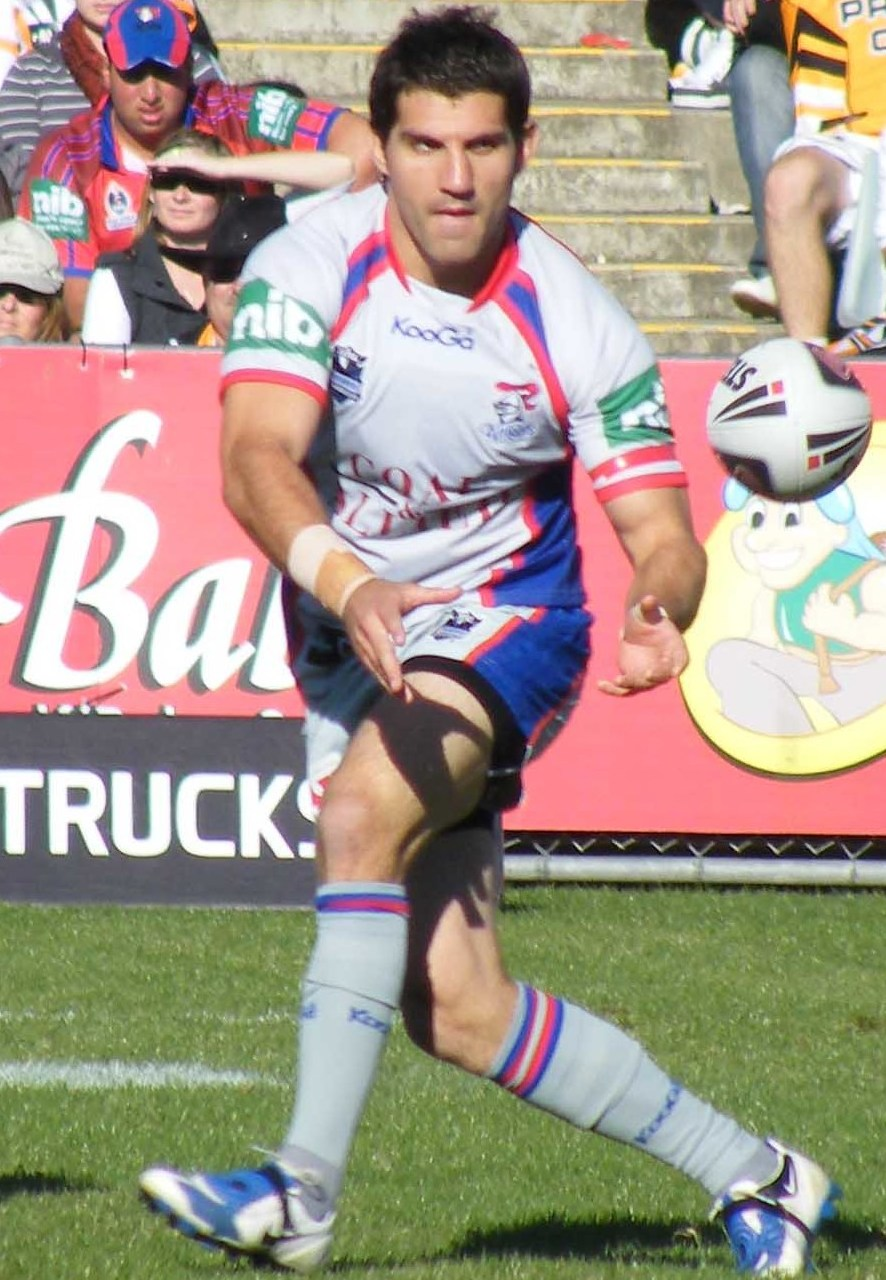

Personal information
- Born: 24 December 1984 (age 41) Bankstown, New South Wales, Australia

Playing information
- Height: 180 cm (5 ft 11 in)
- Weight: 86 kg (13 st 8 lb)
- Position: Hooker
Club
Years	Team	Pld	T	G	FG	P
2006	Wests Tigers	5	1	0	0	4
2007–08	Cronulla Sharks	50	10	0	0	40
2009–11	Newcastle Knights	63	7	0	0	28
2012–14	Cronulla Sharks	56	6	0	0	24
2014–16	Parramatta Eels	51	4	0	0	16
	Total	225	28	0	0	112
Representative
Years	Team	Pld	T	G	FG	P
2005	Portugal

Isaac De Gois (born 24 December 1984), also known by the nickname of "Goisy", is a former Portugal international rugby league footballer. His position was hooker and he played for the Wests Tigers, Newcastle Knights, Cronulla-Sutherland Sharks and Parramatta Eels in the National Rugby League.

== Background ==
De Gois was born in Bankstown, New South Wales, Australia.

== Playing career ==
De Gois is a Wests junior from the Liverpool area. He attended All Saints Catholic Senior College. Of Portuguese descent, De Gois made his international debut before his first-grade debut. He was selected to play for Portugal against Fiji in October, 2005, alongside his two brothers.

=== 2006: Career with Wests Tigers ===
In 2006, De Gois made his first grade debut playing for the Wests Tigers in round 3 against the New Zealand Warriors, but made only 4 other appearances for the rest of the season, due to the form of regular hooker Robbie Farah.

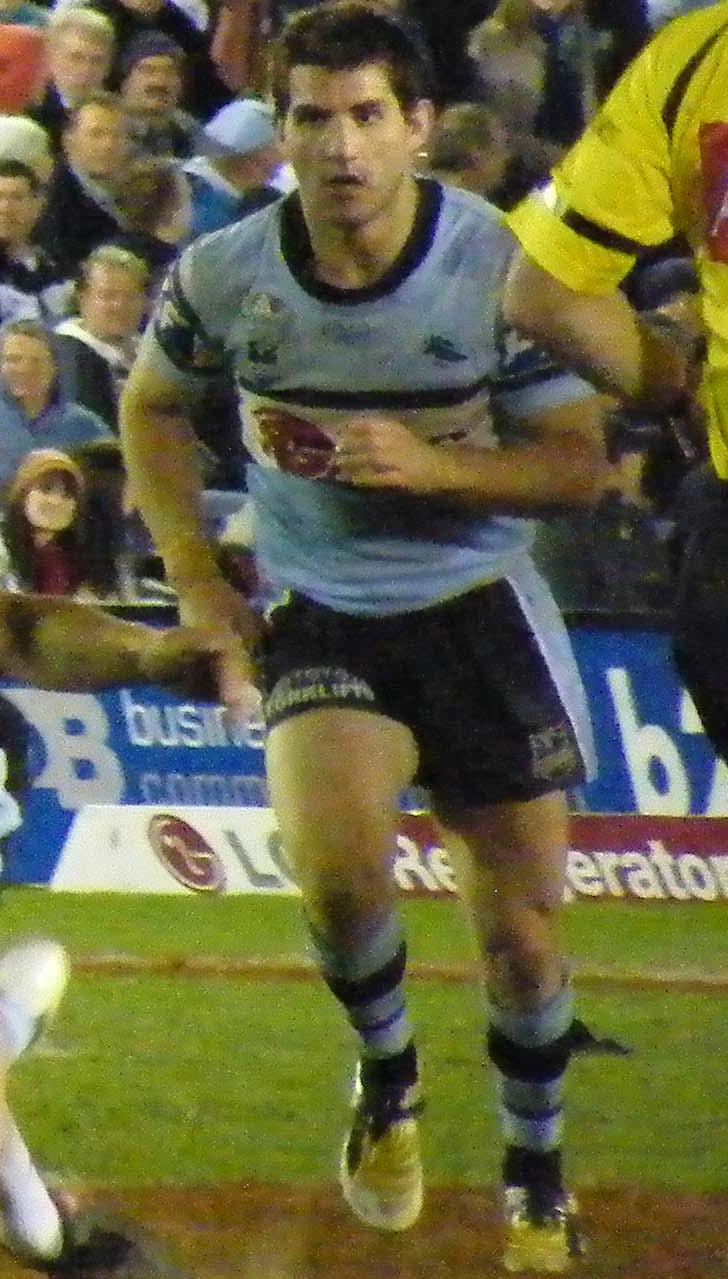
De Gois playing for Cronulla

=== 2007-08: Career with Cronulla ===
De Gois joined the Cronulla-Sutherland Sharks in 2007. He stayed with Cronulla-Sutherland for two seasons, never missing a game. He scored 10 tries in his 50 games, scoring at a rate of one try per five games.

=== 2009-11: Career with Newcastle ===
In April 2008, De Gois announced that he would be playing with the Newcastle Knights from 2009 onwards, signing a deal to keep him at the club until 2011 under the guidance of coach Brian Smith, and as an immediate replacement to the departing Danny Buderus.

De Gois was one of the top tacklers of 2009. He was a vital player in the Knights fairly successful 2009 season. In the last game of the regular season, De Gois injured his left knee, and left the field in the second half. Despite doubts over his fitness, he was named to play in the qualifying final against Canterbury the next week, and re-injured his knee in the first minute of play.

=== 2011-14: Return to Cronulla ===
In June 2011, De Gois signed a three-year deal with Cronulla to return to the club starting in 2012. He played in 23 games in 2012. Coach Shane Flanagan said, "I always wanted to get Isaac De Gois back to Cronulla because I knew what he could bring in terms of attitude and culture."

In his first season at back at Cronulla, the club reached the finals series but were eliminated by the Canberra Raiders. The following year, the club again reached the finals but were defeated by rivals Manly-Warringah in the elimination semi-final. In his final year at Cronulla, he played 9 games as the club endured a horror year on and off the field finishing last. This was mainly due to Cronulla's injury toll and the Cronulla-Sutherland Sharks supplements saga.

=== 2014-16: Career with Parramatta ===
In June 2014, De Gois joined the Parramatta Eels mid-season on a 2 1/2-year contract, as a replacement for Eels hooker Nathan Peats, who was ruled out for the rest of the season with an anterior cruciate ligament (ACL) knee injury.

A concussion suffered in the 2017 pre-season forced De Gois into retirement.

== Love It or List It Australia ==
Isaac De Gois and his partner Renee were the focus of season two episode five of Love It or List It Australia.
