= Kenya Rugby League =

- Founded: 2014
- IRL affiliation: Full members
- Responsibility: Kenya

(Kenya)

The Kenya Rugby League is the governing body for the sport of rugby league in Kenya. The organisation oversees the national team as well as domestic competitions run within the country, including the Kenya RL Premiership.

In November 2021, the European Rugby League recommended that the federation should be awarded Observer status of the International Rugby League. In August 2023, Kenya was elevated to Affiliate membership of the IRL.

In 2024, Kenya bid to host the 2028 Women's and 2030 Men's Rugby League World Cup.

In November 2026, Kenya was awarded full membership by the IRL.

== Kenya RL Premiership ==
Teams

- AP Warriors
- Centurion
- Knights
- Ngong
- Rhinos
- Ruffians
- Sharks
- Wolves

== Kenya Women's League ==
Teams

- AP Warriors
- Wolves

== National team ==
The Kenya national rugby league team represent Kenya in the sport of rugby league football.

== See also ==
- Rugby league in Kenya
- Kenya national rugby league team
