= World Cup Sevens =

World Cup Sevens may refer to:

- Rugby World Cup Sevens, a rugby union sevens tournament
- World Sevens, a defunct rugby league sevens tournament
