= Latin Heat Rugby League =

Latin Heat
Team information
- Nickname: The Heat
- Region: Central & South America
- Head coach: Robert Burgin
- Captain: James Horvat
- Home stadium: N/A

The Latin Heat Rugby League is a multi-national rugby league team focused on providing people of Central and South American residency or heritage a chance to play international rugby league and also help kick-start competitions in each individual Central and South American nation. Latin Heat was initially formed from Australian-based Latinos, but has since expanded to incorporate players from across Latin America, USA, UK and New Zealand.

Latin Heat Rugby League Jersey

== History ==
=== Concept ===
The individual who founded the Latin Heat league was an Australian named Robert Burgin, who was inspired by his personal experience. One of Burgin's best friends in childhood was an Argentinian, Maurizio Merollini, and together they watched Argentina win the 1986 FIFA World Cup and the Argentinian Pumas contest the 1987 Rugby World Cup. Burgin then wondered why Argentina did not play rugby league, his favourite sport. During the 1990s and 2000s, Burgin would remain involved in the Australian rugby league scene.

In 2008 Burgin quit working for the Queensland Rugby League and took the first of six backpacking trips to Latin America; his first trip included Mexico, Guatemala, Nicaragua, Costa Rica, Panama and Colombia. His second trip included Peru, Bolivia, Chile (including Easter Island), Argentina, Uruguay and Brazil. During both these early trips he was profoundly influenced by the culture and believed the people would love the sport of rugby league, were it to be introduced. On his third trip to South America in 2012, during a thunderstorm which lasted several days, he showed rugby league videos to Brazilians in the city of Assis Chateuabriand, Parana, who seemed excited by the sport; from there, Burgin believed the sport could be seriously grown in Latin America.

=== Formation ===
In July 2013, back in Australia, Burgin wrote to Rugby League International Federation development officer Tas Baitieri and expressed his interest in helping to develop the sport for Central and South America. He was then put in touch with two other people who had expressed similar ideas - Matthew Brown, a contributor for Rugby League Planet website, and Rafael Attili, a Brazilian from São Paulo who had previously lived in New Zealand.

On a coaching course that year, Burgin met an NRL Development Officer, Daniel Sarmiento, who he later found out was Colombian-born and fluent in Spanish. Together they started holding training sessions at Wests Mitchelton Rugby League Football Club for Brisbane's Latino community.

After Attili had to withdraw from further contribution due to rugby union commitments, Burgin, Brown and Sarmiento became the three main figures in the foundation of Latin Heat, and are now commonly credited as the three co-founders.

The attendees at the Latin Heat's first training session were Burgin, Sarmiento and two Colombian players - Fernando Villegas and Diego Lopez Pinto.

Graphic designer Joshua Collins designed the original Latin Heat logo and the foundation sponsors were Guzman y Gomez Mexican Tacquerias, Rumba Latina and Gringo Magazine.

The Latin Heat made their debut in a small suburban 9-a-side tournament at Wests Mitchelton in Brisbane on 21 September 2013. Due to more than half the team withdrawing on the eve of the game, the first squad included a lot of non-Latin players; however, six players who played in the tournament were of Latino heritage - Sarmiento, Villegas, Alex Moreno, Josh Gadea-Hellyer, Alejandro Zota Balvin and an Australian-born, Colombian-raised son of missionaries Leighton Johannesen.

The Latin Heat experienced their first international match on the Gold Coast on 18 January 2014 in front of approximately 1500 people. They lost to the Philippines 114–0; however, this was their first full-blooded 13-a-side match and the full 17 players were of Latin American heritage, with most not having any previous experience in the sport.

They then entered the Cabramatta International Nines in Sydney on 2 February 2014. Former USA Tomahawk and 2013 World Cup participant Kristian Freed was a guest player for the Latin Heat squad in the tournament.

After losses to the Philippines and Portugal, they recorded their first international victory against Japan 22–8. They were eliminated, however, against the Greek national side 18–0 in the quarterfinals.

In June 2014 they played against the Thailand Stars, which ended in a 16-all draw after prop Jonathan Espinoza missed a penalty goal from in front during the final minutes at Windsor Sporting Complex in front of a 500-strong crowd. Chilean-born Ernie Tobar was the head coach of the team for the Thailand fixture.

The Latin Heat not only improved on the field, but also improved their profile in the public as well. They appeared in various newspapers and news websites in Sydney and Brisbane and also on the NRL, Fox Sports and Courier Mail websites. One Latin Heat player (Brandon Tobar) won Try of the Week on Channel 9's The Footy Show while playing for Penrith Juniors.

After coach Ernie Tobar stepped aside due to family commitments, Argentinian-born Gabe Keegan became head coach of the Heat.

The team welcomed an influx of highly-influential players around the same time, including 130 kg Sean Day (from the Olarte family in Peru), 125 kg Eduardo Wegener (Chilean heritage) and former Guyana Commonwealth Games representative Kevin McKenzie (born in Guyana).

After again participating in the Wests Mitchelton Nines without much success, Latin Heat took on Portugal at Woolahra Oval in Sydney in October 2014 and won 40–6. The team dedicated the victory to Grace Chacone, mother of influential player Grantito Chacone, who had died in the weeks before the game.

In 2015 in a rematch against the Philippines at Bishop Park, Nundah in Brisbane, the Philippines won 80–4, with Jacob Giuliano scoring the sole try for the Heat.

More players of Latin heritage have been identified for the team in New South Wales, Queensland, Perth, and Melbourne.

== 2014 squad ==
The following list comprises players who are in the Latin Heat representative squad for the 2014 season.

Latin Heat Squad 2014
| First team squad | | Coaching staff |
|---|---|---|
| Carlos Astorga Gonzalez – FB, WG; Fernando Villegas – WG; Luis Guillermo Fohn – SR, CE; Mayer Flamenco – CE, WG; Diego Santiago Gil Vejerano – WG; Daniel Sarmiento – HB, FE; Marco Tulio Pereira (gk) – HB, HK; Sebastian Maya Jimenez – SR, PR; Jye Sommers (c) – FE, SR | Jaden Laing – LK, SR; Jonathan Espinoza (gk) (c) – PR, SR; Juan David Espinal – SR; Josh Gadea-Hellyer – PR; Diego Lopez Pinto; Walter Orellana – PR; Jose Orellana – SR; Alex Moreno – SR; Kris Vieira – CE, WG | Head coach: Ernie Tobar; Assistant coach: Rob Burgin (assistant); Legend: (c) Captain(s); (vc) Vice-captain(s); (gk) Goal kicker; Injured; Updated: 6 June 2014; Source(s): Latin Heat Squad 2014 |

== Results ==
21 September 2013 – Mitchelton Nines, Brisbane: Latin Heat lost to Mitchelton Two 16-30 / Latin Heat lost to University of Queensland 10-36 / Latin Heat lost to Aspley 6-30 / Latin Heat lost to Mitchelton One 14–18)

18 January 2014 – Test versus Philippines, Runaway Bay: Latin Heat lost to Philippines Tamaraws 0–114.

1 February 2014 – Cabramatta International Nines, Sydney: Latin Heat lost to Portugal 6-18 / Latin Heat lost to Philippines Three 10-12 / Latin Heat defeated Japan 22-8 / Latin Heat lost to Greece 0-20.

1 June 2014 - Test versus Thailand, Windsor, NSW: Latin Heat drew with Thailand 16-16.

== Benefits of the team and international exposure ==
Although an Australian-based organisation, the Latin Heat have helped promote rugby league to Central and South America. Both their international games against Philippines and Thailand were broadcast over the internet live. These were watched by people in Australia and in Central and South America. The team also has connections in several Central and South American nations such as Colombia, Mexico, Brazil, Argentina and El Salvador, where there are efforts to help kick-start rugby league in each nation.

Mexico has started up rugby league and has a stable domestic competition consisting of four teams and 80 players. The Latin Heat has helped increase Mexico Rugby League's international presence through social media and raising the profile of their organisation.

The Latin Heat brand has also expanded to the United States. This is an important move because over 52 million Americans are of Latin American heritage, which is not only beneficial for the Latin Heat team, but for international rugby league as well.

The Latin Heat are also attempting to send 1000 rugby league balls to key cities across South America in Spanish and Portuguese through the company Kickstarter. This is to help individuals in each nation who do not know rugby league to learn the game.

The team has also allowed players of Latin American origin to reconnect with their heritage. Players such as Jye Sommers, (captain of the Latin Heat and of Peruvian heritage) said that the Latin Heat has allowed him to appreciate and express his Latin American heritage.

As of 2015 Chile, Colombia, Ecuador, El Salvador, Peru and Uruguay have all been able to field standalone teams in sevens or nines tournaments.
