= Peru national rugby league team =

Peru
Team information
- Nickname: Incas
- Region: South America
- Head coach: Tuki Jackson
- Captain: Jye Sommers

Uniforms
First colours

Team results
- First international
- Peru 34–30 Uruguay (15 September 2019)
- Biggest win
- Peru 34-30 Uruguay (15 September 2019)
- Biggest defeat
- Peru 14-30 Brazil (22 February 2020)

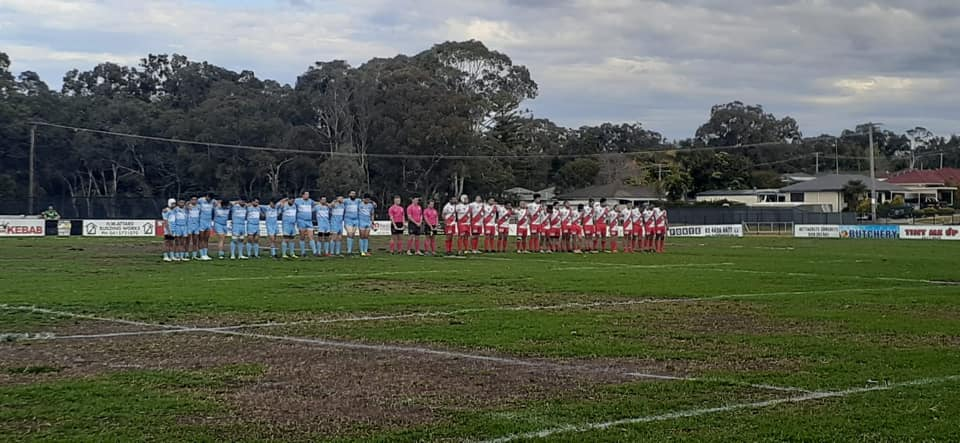
The Incas and Uruguay line up for anthems prior to their clash on 15/9/19.

The Peru national rugby league team (Spanish: Rugby league equipo nacional de Peru), nicknamed Incas (English: Peru Incas), represents Peru in rugby league.

== History ==
The sport has yet to be played on Peruvian soil but efforts are in place to bring rugby league to Central and South America through the Latin Heat Rugby League. The Latin Heat fielded enough Peruvian players to make up a Rugby league sevens team so they have entered into the first ever Latino Rugby League Sevens tournament.

The Incas made their debut at the first ever Latino Sevens on 17 October 2015, recording their first ever victories and making it to the final. The Incas also participated in a festival of Latin American Rugby League which was held at Henson Park in June, 2016. Each nation fielded either a Nine-a-side or a Seven-a-side team, the other participating nations included Ecuador, Colombia and Uruguay. The Incas made their International 13-a-side rugby league debut against Uruguay at Waminda Oval in Campbelltown, NSW. The Incas won this match 34-30, giving them a win on debut.

== Current squad ==
This is the current squad as of the 15th of September 2019.

1. Jye Sommers NSW
2. Sean Day NSW
3. Juan Carlos Carrion NSW
4. Aaron Perez NSW
5. Mitchell Perez NSW
6. Corey Daniela NSW
7. Franko Altamirano NSW
8. George Altamirano NSW
9. Paul Altamirano NSW
10. Luis Fhon NSW
11. Martin Portillo NSW
12. Samuel Arevalo NSW
13. Jonathan Julca NSW
14. Sergio Rios VIC
15. Jacob Parker NSW
16. Isaiah Parker NSW
17. Josh Marrufo-Davidson QLD
18. Christopher Siles VIC
19. Miguel Garcia NSW
20. Claudio Flores Casas NSW
21. Eddy Gomez NSW
22. Julio Rojas NSW
23. Alonso Gomez NSW
24. Mariano Polisciuk NSW
25. Jayden Ibarburu & Cristian Ibarburu NSW
26. Kenneth Hopkins NSW

== Record ==
Below is table of the representative rugby league matches played by Peru at test level up until the 22nd of February, 2020. The table includes 7-a-side, 9-a-side and 13-a-side International matches.

Opponent	Played	Won	Lost	Drawn	Win %	For	Aga	Diff
Brazil	2	0	2	0	0%	18	44	-26
Chile	1	0	1	0	0%	10	14	-4
Colombia	1	1	0	0	100%	12	4	8
Ecuador	1	1	0	0	100%	28	0	28
Nicaragua	1	1	0	0	100%	34	12	22
Uruguay	4	1	3	0	25%	68	82	-14
Total	11	4	7	0	40.00%	184	186	14

13-a-side fixtures and results:

15 September 2019
15:00 AEST (UTC+10)

Peru	34 – 30	Uruguay
Tries: Jye Sommers (3), Isaiah Parker, Sean Day, Josh Marrufo-Davidson, Jayden Ibarburu; Goals: Frank Altamirano (3)	Report	Tries: Diego Papa (2), Julio Toledo, Steve Clarke, Nico Papa; Goals: Diego Papa (5)

Waminda Oval, Sydney
Referee: Wayne Beh (Australia)

22 February 2020
17:00 AEST (UTC+10)

Brazil	30 – 14	Peru
	[]

Hillier Oval, Liverpool, Sydney
Referee: (Australia)
