= North Macedonia national rugby league team =

North Macedonia

Team information
- Nickname: The Lions
- Governing body: Macedonian Rugby League
- Region: Europe
- Head coach: Aaron Zammit
- Captain: James Mirceski
- Most caps: 10 Players (3)
- Top try-scorer: Jayden Gouganovski (3)
- Top point-scorer: Jayden Gouganovski & James Suleski (12)
- Home stadium: Forshaw Park
- IRL ranking: 37th

Uniforms
First colours

Team results
- First game
- North Macedonia 8-40 Poland (Forshaw Park, Sydney, Australia; 21 October 2023)
- Biggest defeat
- North Macedonia 8-40 Poland (Forshaw Park, Sydney, Australia; 21 October 2023)
- World Cup
- Appearances: 0

IRL Men's World Rankings
Official rankings as of August 2026
| Rank | Change | Team | Pts % |
| 1 | Steady | Australia | 100 |
| 2 | Steady | New Zealand | 82 |
| 3 | Steady | England | 70 |
| 4 | Steady | Samoa | 56 |
| 5 | Steady | Tonga | 54 |
| 6 | Steady | Papua New Guinea | 47 |
| 7 | Steady | Fiji | 34 |
| 8 | ▲1 | Cook Islands | 24 |
| 9 | ▲2 | Netherlands | 23 |
| 10 | ▲2 | Ukraine | 21 |
| 11 | ▼3 | France | 21 |
| 12 | ▼2 | Serbia | 20 |
| 13 | Steady | Wales | 18 |
| 14 | Steady | Ireland | 17 |
| 15 | Steady | Greece | 14 |
| 16 | Steady | Malta | 14 |
| 17 | ▲12 | Canada | 13 |
| 18 | ▼1 | Italy | 11 |
| 19 | ▼1 | Jamaica | 9 |
| 20 | ▲7 | Scotland | 8 |
| 21 | ▲1 | United States | 8 |
| 22 | ▼3 | Poland | 7 |
| 23 | ▼3 | Lebanon | 7 |
| 24 | ▼1 | Germany | 7 |
| 25 | ▼1 | Czech Republic | 6 |
| 26 | ▼5 | Norway | 6 |
| 27 | ▼2 | Chile | 5 |
| 28 | ▲2 | Philippines | 5 |
| 29 | ▼1 | South Africa | 4 |
| 30 | Steady | Brazil | 3 |
| 31 | Steady | Morocco | 3 |
| 32 | ▲1 | Argentina | 3 |
| 33 | ▲2 | Ghana | 2 |
| 34 | ▲2 | Kenya | 2 |
| 35 | ▼1 | Montenegro | 2 |
| 36 | ▲1 | Nigeria | 2 |
| 37 | ▼5 | North Macedonia | 1 |
| 38 | Steady | Albania | 1 |
| 39 | Steady | Turkey | 1 |
| 40 | Steady | Bulgaria | 1 |
| 41 | Steady | Cameroon | 0 |
| 42 | Steady | Japan | 0 |
| 43 | Steady | Spain | 0 |
| 44 | Steady | Colombia | 0 |
| 45 | Steady | Russia | 0 |
| 46 | Steady | El Salvador | 0 |
| 47 | Steady | Bosnia and Herzegovina | 0 |
| 48 | Steady | Hong Kong | 0 |
| 49 | Steady | Solomon Islands | 0 |
| 50 | Steady | Vanuatu | 0 |
| 51 | Steady | Hungary | 0 |
| 52 | Steady | Latvia | 0 |
| 53 | Steady | Denmark | 0 |
| 54 | Steady | Belgium | 0 |
| 55 | Steady | Estonia | 0 |
| 56 | Steady | Sweden | 0 |
| 57 | Steady | Niue | 0 |
Complete rankings at www.internationalrugbyleague.com

The North Macedonia national rugby league team (nicknamed the Lions) represent North Macedonia in international rugby league football competitions.

In October 2022, a North Macedonia team took part in the New South Wales Rugby League Harmony Nines tournament and won the emerging nations competition. North Macedonia applied for membership of the International Rugby League and were awarded observer status in April 2023. In October 2023, the Nines team repeated it success in the Harmony Nines tournament and a week later North Macedonia made its full international debut against Poland. In June 2026, North Macedonia Rugby League had its observer member status of International Rugby League withdrawn.

== Competitive record ==
Below is table of the official representative rugby league matches played by Macedonia at test level up until 18 February 2024:

| Team | First Played | Played | Win | Draw | Loss | Points For | Points Against | Last Meeting |
|---|---|---|---|---|---|---|---|---|
| Chile | 2024 | 1 | 0 | 0 | 1 | 22 | 36 | 2024 |
| Malta | 2024 | 1 | 0 | 0 | 1 | 18 | 22 | 2024 |
| Poland | 2023 | 1 | 0 | 0 | 1 | 8 | 40 | 2023 |
| Total | | 3 | 0 | 0 | 3 | 48 | 98 | |

=== Results ===
| Date | Score (Note: North Macedonia score given first) | Opponent | Competition | Venue | Report |
|---|---|---|---|---|---|
| 21 October 2023 | 8–40 | Poland | Friendly | Forshaw Park, Sydney, Australia | |
| 4 February 2024 | 18–36 | Chile | Friendly | Forshaw Park, Sydney, Australia | |
| 18 February 2024 | 18–22 | Malta | Friendly | Forshaw Park, Sydney, Australia | |
