= 2010 Rugby League European Bowl =

2010 European Bowl
- Number of teams: 2
- Winner: Malta (1st title)
- Matches played: 1

The 2010 European Bowl was due to be a single group of three teams containing Belgium, Malta and Norway. But Belgium withdrew leaving Malta and Norway to play a one-off match.

On 4 June, Malta came from 10–0 down midway through the first half to defeat Norway, 30–20 to take the Rugby League European Federation Bowl at the Victor Tedesco Stadium, Hamrun.

4 June 2010

Malta	30–20	Norway
Tries: Grima, M. Attard, Bonanno, Bartlett (2); Conv: Attard (5)	(Report)	Tries: Schmidt, Borsheim (2), Mellor; Conv: Meldalen, Ytterdahi Elgheim

Victor Tedesco Stadium, Hamrun
