= Kenya national rugby league team =

Kenya

Team information
- Nickname: Kenyan Eagles
- Governing body: Kenya Rugby League
- Region: Middle East-Africa
- Head coach: John Mbai
- Captain: Dominic Mose
- IRL ranking: 34th

Team results
- First international
- Kenya 34–24 Italy (Watamu, Kenya; 25 March 2014)
- Biggest win
- Cameroon 0–16 Kenya (University of Ghana stadium, Ghana; 1 October 2022)
- Biggest defeat
- France 108–4 Kenya (Impala Rugby Stadium, Kenya; 5 December 2023)
- World Cup
- Appearances: 0

The Kenya national rugby league team represent Kenya in the sport of rugby league football.

== History ==
They made their international rugby league debut against Italy where Kenya defeated them 34-24 in front of over 5000 fans at a local primary school in Watamu. The team was hastily formed from selection of local rugby union players. They were introduced to the rules and regulations in rugby league for merely one week before the match.

Debut Squad

1. Allan Limo
2. Simon Kisaka
3. Mike Shibudu
4. Nelman Likami
5. Collins Ochieng
6. Mackenzie Silla
7. Kevin Macharia
8. Bob Mutwiri
9. Jeremy Chimwani
10. Allan Omuka
11. Dominic Mose
12. Dennis Oyombe
13. Hyke Otieno
14. Sora Hassan
- Head Coach: Jason Hammond

In December 2023, Kenya hosted France in a two match test series, marking Kenya's first matches against an affiliate member nation.

== Competitive Record ==
Team	First Played	Played	Win	Draw	Loss	%	Last meeting
Cameroon	2022	1	1	0	0	100%	2022
France	2023	2	0	0	2	0%	2023
Ghana	2022	1	0	0	1	0%	2022
Italy	2014	1	1	0	0	100%	2014
South Africa	2023	2	0	0	2	0%	2023
Uganda	2023	0	0	0	0	0%	2023
Total	2014	7	2	0	5	30%	2023

== IRL Rankings ==
IRL Men's World Rankings
Official rankings as of August 2026
Rank	Change	Team	Pts %
1	Steady	Australia	100
2	Steady	New Zealand	82
3	Steady	England	70
4	Steady	Samoa	56
5	Steady	Tonga	54
6	Steady	Papua New Guinea	47
7	Steady	Fiji	34
8	▲1	Cook Islands	24
9	▲2	Netherlands	23
10	▲2	Ukraine	21
11	▼3	France	21
12	▼2	Serbia	20
13	Steady	Wales	18
14	Steady	Ireland	17
15	Steady	Greece	14
16	Steady	Malta	14
17	▲12	Canada	13
18	▼1	Italy	11
19	▼1	Jamaica	9
20	▲7	Scotland	8
21	▲1	United States	8
22	▼3	Poland	7
23	▼3	Lebanon	7
24	▼1	Germany	7
25	▼1	Czech Republic	6
26	▼5	Norway	6
27	▼2	Chile	5
28	▲2	Philippines	5
29	▼1	South Africa	4
30	Steady	Brazil	3
31	Steady	Morocco	3
32	▲1	Argentina	3
33	▲2	Ghana	2
34	▲2	Kenya	2
35	▼1	Montenegro	2
36	▲1	Nigeria	2
37	▼5	North Macedonia	1
38	Steady	Albania	1
39	Steady	Turkey	1
40	Steady	Bulgaria	1
41	Steady	Cameroon	0
42	Steady	Japan	0
43	Steady	Spain	0
44	Steady	Colombia	0
45	Steady	Russia	0
46	Steady	El Salvador	0
47	Steady	Bosnia and Herzegovina	0
48	Steady	Hong Kong	0
49	Steady	Solomon Islands	0
50	Steady	Vanuatu	0
51	Steady	Hungary	0
52	Steady	Latvia	0
53	Steady	Denmark	0
54	Steady	Belgium	0
55	Steady	Estonia	0
56	Steady	Sweden	0
57	Steady	Niue	0
Complete rankings at www.internationalrugbyleague.com

== See also ==
- Rugby league in Kenya
- Kenya Rugby League
- Rugby league in Africa
