= Brazil national rugby league team =

Brasil

Team information
- Nickname: Carcarás (Caracaras)
- Governing body: Confederação Brasileira de Rugby League
- Region: Americas
- Head coach: Caio Ozzioli
- Captain: Alcino Pisani
- Most caps: Bruno Gil
- Top point-scorer: Leandro Caetano
- IRL ranking: 30th

Team results
- First international
- Chile 54–8 Brazil (Los Ángeles, Chile; 17 November 2017)
- Biggest win
- Brazil 60–0 Uruguay (Sydney, Australia; 28 February 2021)
- Biggest defeat
- South Africa 82–0 Brazil (Sunshine Coast, Australia; 5 June 2022)
- World Cup
- Appearances: 0 (first time in -)
- Best result: -

The Brazil national rugby league team represents Brazil in the sport of rugby league. The nation made its international debut at the inaugural Latin American Rugby League Championship held in Los Ángeles, Chile in November 2017, losing to the hosts in their first international match. The team is currently ranked 30th as of December 2025, in the IRL World Rankings.

== Competitive record ==
Opponent	Played	Won	Drawn	Lost	Last meeting
Argentina	2	2	0	0	2022
Chile	2	1	0	1	2022
Colombia	3	2	0	1	2022
Peru	1	1	0	0	2020
Philippines	1	0	0	1	2021
South Africa	1	0	0	1	2022
Uruguay	1	1	0	0	2021
Total	11	7	0	4	

== IRL Rankings ==
IRL Men's World Rankings
Official rankings as of August 2026
Rank	Change	Team	Pts %
1	Steady	Australia	100
2	Steady	New Zealand	82
3	Steady	England	70
4	Steady	Samoa	56
5	Steady	Tonga	54
6	Steady	Papua New Guinea	47
7	Steady	Fiji	34
8	▲1	Cook Islands	24
9	▲2	Netherlands	23
10	▲2	Ukraine	21
11	▼3	France	21
12	▼2	Serbia	20
13	Steady	Wales	18
14	Steady	Ireland	17
15	Steady	Greece	14
16	Steady	Malta	14
17	▲12	Canada	13
18	▼1	Italy	11
19	▼1	Jamaica	9
20	▲7	Scotland	8
21	▲1	United States	8
22	▼3	Poland	7
23	▼3	Lebanon	7
24	▼1	Germany	7
25	▼1	Czech Republic	6
26	▼5	Norway	6
27	▼2	Chile	5
28	▲2	Philippines	5
29	▼1	South Africa	4
30	Steady	Brazil	3
31	Steady	Morocco	3
32	▲1	Argentina	3
33	▲2	Ghana	2
34	▲2	Kenya	2
35	▼1	Montenegro	2
36	▲1	Nigeria	2
37	▼5	North Macedonia	1
38	Steady	Albania	1
39	Steady	Turkey	1
40	Steady	Bulgaria	1
41	Steady	Cameroon	0
42	Steady	Japan	0
43	Steady	Spain	0
44	Steady	Colombia	0
45	Steady	Russia	0
46	Steady	El Salvador	0
47	Steady	Bosnia and Herzegovina	0
48	Steady	Hong Kong	0
49	Steady	Solomon Islands	0
50	Steady	Vanuatu	0
51	Steady	Hungary	0
52	Steady	Latvia	0
53	Steady	Denmark	0
54	Steady	Belgium	0
55	Steady	Estonia	0
56	Steady	Sweden	0
57	Steady	Niue	0
Complete rankings at www.internationalrugbyleague.com
