= Rugby League World Sevens =

Defunct rugby league sevens tournament

World Sevens
- Sport: Rugby league
- Instituted: 1988
- Ceased: 2004
- Region: International
- Holders: Wests Tigers (2004)
- Most titles: Manly-Warringah Sea Eagles (3 titles)

The Rugby League World Sevens, usually referred to as the World Sevens and sometimes as the World Cup Sevens, was a pre-season rugby league sevens tournament made up over the years primarily of New South Wales Rugby League (NSWRL), Australian Rugby League (ARL) and mostly recently National Rugby League (NRL) teams, along with teams representing NSW Country and nations including Tonga, France, Papua New Guinea, Samoa, Russia, Fiji, the US and England.

When the National Rugby League was formed in Australasia in 1998 the World Sevens competition was dropped, but it returned in 2003 when Parramatta successfully defended their title from the last time in 1997.

== Format and rules ==
The World Sevens format saw entrants divided into eight pools. The top team in each pool progressed into the quarter-finals.

Until 2004, second placed teams from each pool would play each other, as would third placed teams. In 2004, when the competition was known as the Cougar Bourbon World Sevens, this format changed, when only the top placed teams played for the major prize.

Each match played up to and including the semi-finals had two 7-minute halves with extra time played in the event of tie at the end normal time. The final is longer with two 10-minute halves. In 2004, the tackle limit was reduced from 6 to 4.

== History ==
The World Sevens were held at Parramatta Stadium from 1988 to 1991 and Sydney Football Stadium from 1992 to 2004, with the 1995 tournament's opening day being held at Suncorp Stadium in Brisbane, and the 1996 tournament's opening day taking place at Parramatta Stadium.

Wigan played in the rain-soaked 1992 World Sevens as they opted to fulfil a promise made by their club's chairman, Maurice Lindsay, to appear despite having commitments in the Challenge Cup. After a win in extra time against Cronulla in the opening match hinted at a strong challenge for the title, a poor performance and loss to the Gold Coast Seagulls saw Wigan's challenge seeming likely to fail. The group stage ended with each team in Wigan's group having won one game, but by virtue of "most tries scored" they proceeded to the quarter-finals, despite their chances being largely written off. John Monie, the Wigan coach, told his team, "We've copped a bit of a bagging in the press today saying we're a typical Pommy side and can't tackle ... and the other thing was that they say 'Oh, Penrith's got the easy draw again because they're playing Wigan'". In the event, Wigan breezed past Penrith 22–8 in the quarter-final and a Denis Betts try in extra time won the semi-final against Manly. Scorer of six tries before the game, Martin Offiah, the Man of the Series, scored four more in the final played against the Brisbane Broncos (the former club of Wigan's new recruit for 1992, Gene Miles), a game Wigan won 18–6.

1993 saw Wigan not defending their title. Eastern Suburbs defeated Manly Warringah in the final. The Sea Eagles would go on to win both the 1994 and 1995 World Sevens defeating St George and Fiji respectively. Manly's wins actually could have been potentially embarrassing for the tournaments organisers. During these two years the Sevens major sponsor was Coca-Cola who put up the A$100,000 winners purse. At the time of their wins, Manly Warringah's major sponsor was Coke's major rival Pepsi.

In 1996, Canada became the first side in World Sevens not to score a point throughout the tournament. The Canadians lost to the Newcastle Knights 52–0 and New Zealand 56–0 in the group stage and to Western Suburbs 48–0 in the plate quarter-finals.

Nathan Hindmarsh was deemed Player of the Series as Parramatta stormed to victory in the 2003 competition. Parramatta beat Canberra in their quarter-final, followed by South Sydney in the semi-final. The final pitted England against a Parramatta side that flew to the lead, scoring five tries before half-time to England's one by Keith Senior. The match finished 42–18. The Plate final was won by the Bulldogs who beat New Zealand and the Bowl final was won by North Queensland who beat Fiji.

In 2004, the Wests Tigers took the title, winning 18–7 in the final and ending Parramatta's campaign for a third consecutive title. The Wests Tigers' first title as a merged entity gained them A$100,000 in prize money.

=== 2004: tournament ceases ===
The lead-up to the 2004 tournament was disrupted by setbacks for the World Sevens. Some NRL clubs withdrew their top players. Steve Folkes, the Bulldogs coach, attacked the event, arguing that it put his players at risk of injury. Other clubs including the Wests Tigers, Parramatta and Manly continued to support the event by fielding strong sides. ARL chairman Colin Love threatened to change the rules to make it compulsory for all clubs to have their top players participate, and stated that any club which refused to do so could be hit with sanctions that involved them not being invited to participate in the following year's competition.

The competition's standing was further weakened by news that Channel 9 would only be broadcasting a limited highlights television programme in areas of New South Wales and Queensland, despite having rights to show the event live.

Ultimately, the fact that the 2004 tournament drew 15,000 fewer fans than the previous year led to the tournament being axed.

== The future ==
In the years since the tournament was indefinitely suspended in 2004 other tournaments have provided continued international rugby league sevens events.

Actor Russell Crowe hosts the Orara Valley Axemen Sevens Tournament at Coffs Harbour on the New South Wales north coast. This tournament is participated in by teams representing countries of the world, local clubs and a few clubs from Brisbane. In 2005 the Souths Logan Magpies from the Queensland Wizard Cup and the Gold Coast Titans, who entered the NRL in 2007, were two well known clubs that participated.

In 2008, it emerged that the World Sevens could make a comeback by 2010. The competitors in the revived competition would be international sides rather than the assorted mix of clubs, nations and other representative sides of the past. A competition between only national sides is considered to have value in growing rugby league nations to a higher skill level and the exposure to new audiences globally of the sport via broadcast coverage.

The other motivation for this potential change was voiced by Tas Baiteri, International Development Officer for the Rugby League International Federation, who stated: "We would be looking at just having nations in the World Sevens. By having an Australian team means that it will not interrupt preparations for any NRL clubs". One reason for the hiatus following the 2004 event was reluctance of NRL clubs to use so many of their first team players.

With proposed entrants in future competitions being national teams, the need for the tournament to be hosted in Sydney each year has been debated with some arguing that the World Sevens should be used as a tool to spread the sport further by hosting in a succession of locations globally.

According to Rugby League Review, there is a possibility that the Sevens derivative could be replaced by a nines tournament should there be enough support from the rugby league authorities entering teams.

In 2014, the National Rugby League held the first edition of the Auckland Nines, contested between National Rugby League teams only.

== Finals ==
Year	Winners	Titles	Score	Runner-up	Source
1988	South Sydney Rabbitohs	1	28-18	Canberra Raiders	
1989	Balmain Tigers	1	12-10	Eastern Suburbs Roosters	
1990	Manly-Warringah Sea Eagles	1	24-22	Parramatta Eels	
1991	Newcastle Knights	1	24-22	St George Dragons	
1992	Wigan Warriors	1	18–6	Brisbane Broncos	
1993	Eastern Suburbs Roosters	1	18–12	Manly-Warringah Sea Eagles	
1994	Manly-Warringah Sea Eagles	2	44–12	St. George Dragons	
1995	Manly-Warringah Sea Eagles	3	36–12	Fiji Bati	
1996	Newcastle Knights	2	48–18	North Sydney Bears	
1997	Parramatta Eels	1	32–22	North Sydney Bears	
1998	Not held	N/A	N/A	N/A	
1999	Not held	N/A	N/A	N/A	
2000	Not held	N/A	N/A	N/A	
2001	Not held	N/A	N/A	N/A	
2002	Not held	N/A	N/A	N/A	
2003	Parramatta Eels	2	48–18	England Lions	
2004	Wests Tigers	1	18–7	Parramatta Eels	

Note

a: First title for Wests Tigers but one previous win for Balmain Tigers, a merged partner in Wests Tigers
