= IRL Men's World Rankings =

Ranking system for men's national teams in rugby league

IRL Men's World Rankings
Official rankings as of August 2026
Rank	Change	Team	Pts %
1	Steady	Australia	100
2	Steady	New Zealand	82
3	Steady	Tonga	70
4	Steady	Samoa	56
5	Steady	England	54
6	Steady	Papua New Guinea	47
7	Steady	Fiji	34
8	▲1	Cook Islands	24
9	▲2	Netherlands	23
10	▲2	Ukraine	21
11	▼3	France	21
12	▼2	Serbia	20
13	Steady	Wales	18
14	Steady	Ireland	17
15	Steady	Greece	14
16	Steady	Malta	14
17	▲12	Canada	13
18	▼1	Italy	11
19	▼1	Jamaica	9
20	▲7	Scotland	8
21	▲1	United States	8
22	▼3	Poland	7
23	▼3	Lebanon	7
24	▼1	Germany	7
25	▼1	Czech Republic	6
26	▼5	Norway	6
27	▼2	Chile	5
28	▲2	Philippines	5
29	▼1	South Africa	4
30	Steady	Brazil	3
31	Steady	Morocco	3
32	▲1	Argentina	3
33	▲2	Ghana	2
34	▲2	Kenya	2
35	▼1	Montenegro	2
36	▲1	Nigeria	2
37	▼5	North Macedonia	1
38	Steady	Albania	1
39	Steady	Turkey	1
40	Steady	Bulgaria	1
41	Steady	Cameroon	0
42	Steady	Japan	0
43	Steady	Spain	0
44	Steady	Colombia	0
45	Steady	Russia	0
46	Steady	El Salvador	0
47	Steady	Bosnia and Herzegovina	0
48	Steady	Hong Kong	0
49	Steady	Solomon Islands	0
50	Steady	Vanuatu	0
51	Steady	Hungary	0
52	Steady	Latvia	0
53	Steady	Denmark	0
54	Steady	Belgium	0
55	Steady	Estonia	0
56	Steady	Sweden	0
57	Steady	Niue	0
Complete rankings at www.internationalrugbyleague.com

The IRL Men's World Rankings are the ranking system for men's national teams in the sport of rugby league football. The teams of the member nations of the International Rugby League, rugby league football's world governing body, are ranked based on their game results with the most successful teams being ranked highest. A point system is used, with points being awarded based on the results of IRL-recognised international matches. Under the existing system, rankings are based on a team's performance over the last three years, with more recent results and more significant matches being more heavily weighted to help reflect the current competitive state of a team.

== Ranking system ==
The IRL World Rankings are calculated based on an average of points accumulated by each nation over a three-year cycle. Under the structure, matches deemed of higher importance such as World Cup games, Four Nations and other major tournament finals draw more points than mid-season Tests and other ‘Internationals’. For each match that a nation participates they are given a base level of points. This base level is affected upon the type of match (World Cup, Major Tournament, Test Match and International) and the status of the opponent.

Bonus points are given for teams that reach certain milestones deemed of significant international importance including reaching a tournament final or qualifying for an event such as a World Cup.

From the total number of points that a nation will receive these points are then averaged to help give a more accurate view of the performance of a nation over the three-year cycle.

Nations which have played fewer than 5 matches over a three-year cycle will be penalised under the current point structure.

== Use of the rankings ==
The rankings are used by International Rugby League to view the progression and ability of the national rugby league teams.

The data is currently used in things as seeding for tournaments such as the European Cup, Oceania Cup MEA Championship, Americas Championship and the South American Championship and the World Cup.

== Current calculation method ==
=== Match status ===
A weighting system has been implemented by the IRL to give more points to teams if they gain a victory over a major team in a major tournament, with friendlies ranked with considerably fewer points than any World Cup finals match or the final of Cups such as the European, Mediterranean and Pacific Cups.

=== Opponent strength ===
The IRL has organised the ranking so that a win against a very highly ranked opponent is a considerably greater achievement than a win against a low-rated opponent, so the strength of the opposing team is a factor.

=== Assessment period ===
All matches played over the last three years are included in the calculation of the rankings, but there is a weighting system implemented to put more emphasis on recent results.

== Historical rankings ==
As of August 2026

Team	Jun 2013	Dec 2013	Aug 2014	Nov 2014	May 2015	Dec 2015	Jun 2016	Oct 2016	Nov 2016	May 2017	Oct 2017	Dec 2017	Jul 2018	Dec 2018	Jul 2019	Nov 2019	Dec 2021	Jul 2022	Dec 2022	Jun 2023	Dec 2023	Jun 2024	Dec 2024	Jun 2025	Nov 2025	Dec 2025	Aug 2026
Albania	–	–	–	–	–	–	–	–	–	–	–	–	–	–	–	–	–	–	–	–	39	40 (▼1)	35 (▲5)	36 (▼1)	36	38 (▼2)	38
Argentina	–	–	–	–	–	–	–	–	–	–	–	39	39	42 (▼3)	42	–	–	–	51	49 (▲2)	52 (▼3)	49 (▲3)	34 (▲15)	35 (▼1)	34 (▲1)	33 (▲1)	32 (▲1)
Australia	1	1	1	1	2 (▼1)	2	2	2	1 (▲1)	1	1	1	1	1	1	2 (▼1)	4 (▼2)	4	1 (▲3)	1	1	1	1	1	1	1	1
Belgium	31	29 (▲2)	22 (▲5)	22	18 (▲4)	17 (▲1)	17	17	18 (▼1)	18	20 (▼2)	20	23 (▼3)	39 (▼16)	42 (▼3)	42	41 (▲1)	47 (▼6)	48 (▼1)	48	49 (▼1)	55 (▼6)	53 (▲2)	54 (▼1)	54	54	54
Bosnia and Herzegovina	–	–	–	–	–	–	–	–	–	–	–	–	–	–	–	–	44	43 (▲1)	40 (▲3)	45 (▼5)	45	47 (▼2)	46 (▲1)	47 (▼1)	47	47	47
Brazil	–	–	–	–	–	–	–	–	–	–	–	43	43	45 (▼2)	45 (▲1)	41 (▲4)	42 (▼1)	40 (▲2)	22 (▲18)	25 (▼3)	31 (▼6)	33 (▼2)	29 (▲4)	29	29	30 (▼1)	30
Bulgaria	–	–	–	–	–	–	–	–	–	–	41	46 (▼5)	46	47 (▼1)	48 (▼1)	44 (▲4)	39 (▲5)	41 (▼2)	34 (▲7)	35 (▼1)	34 (▲1)	36 (▼2)	36	37 (▼1)	38 (▼1)	40 (▼2)	40
Cameroon	–	–	–	–	–	–	–	–	–	–	–	–	–	–	–	38	34 (▲4)	36 (▼2)	31 (▲5)	30 (▲1)	35 (▼5)	37 (▼2)	40 (▼3)	41 (▼1)	42 (▼1)	41 (▲1)	41
Canada	19	16 (▲3)	16	14 (▲2)	13 (▲1)	13	14 (▼1)	14	12 (▲2)	13 (▼1)	15 (▼2)	17 (▼2)	16 (▲1)	21 (▼5)	21	27 (▼6)	36 (▼9)	38 (▼2)	44 (▼6)	43 (▲1)	46 (▼3)	41 (▲5)	31 (▲10)	31	30 (▲1)	29 (▲1)	17 (▲12)
Chile	–	–	–	–	–	–	–	34	34	36 (▼2)	37 (▼1)	32 (▲5)	33 (▼1)	32 (▲1)	33 (▼1)	32 (▲1)	43 (▼11)	32 (▲11)	23 (▲9)	22 (▲1)	26 (▼4)	23 (▲3)	21 (▲2)	23 (▼2)	25 (▼2)	25	27 (▼2)
Colombia	–	–	–	–	–	–	–	–	–	–	–	40	40	41 (▲1)	41	40 (▲1)	45 (▼5)	45	36 (▲9)	36	40 (▼4)	42 (▼2)	43 (▼1)	44 (▼1)	41 (▲3)	44 (▼3)	44
Cook Islands	17	14 (▲3)	15 (▼1)	17 (▼2)	17	22 (▼5)	19 (▲3)	22 (▼3)	25 (▼3)	24 (▲1)	24	30 (▼6)	31 (▼1)	43 (▼12)	28 (▲17)	23 (▲5)	22 (▲1)	20 (▼2)	12 (▲8)	13 (▼1)	10 (▲3)	10	10	10	9 (▲1)	9	8 (▲1)
Czech Republic	–	26	30 (▼4)	29 (▲1)	30 (▼1)	30	29 (▲1)	25 (▲4)	24 (▲1)	25 (▼1)	26 (▼1)	26	24 (▲2)	25 (▼1)	25	22 (▲3	17 (▲5	18 (▼1)	27 (▼9)	27	21 (▲6)	21	20 (▲1)	21 (▼1)	24 (▼3)	24	25 (▼1)
Denmark	26	27 (▼1)	27	26 (▲1)	27 (▼1)	25 (▲2)	25	27 (▼2)	27	27	32 (▼5)	34 (▼2)	35 (▼1)	44 (▼9)	47 (▼3)	43 (▲4)	46 (▼3)	46	49 (▼3)	50 (▼1)	53 (▼3)	54 (▼1)	52 (▲2)	53 (▼1)	53	53	53
El Salvador	–	–	–	–	–	–	–	39	39	38 (▲1)	39 (▼1)	37 (▲2)	37	36 (▲1)	38 (▼2)	–	–	–	47	47	41 (▲6)	43 (▼2)	44 (▼1)	45 (▼1)	46 (▼1)	46	46
England	3	3	3	3	3	3	3	3	3	3	3	3	3	2 (▲1)	2	3 (▼1)	2 (▲1)	3 (▼1)	4 (▼1)	4	3 (▲1)	3	3	3	3	3	3
Estonia	27	–	–	–	–	–	–	–	–	–	–	–	–	–	–	–	–	–	–	–	55	56 (▼1)	54 (▲2)	55 (▼1)	55	55	55
Fiji	7	5 (▲2)	5	6 (▼1)	6	7 (▼1)	7	6 (▲1)	7 (▼1)	8 (▼1)	7 (▲1)	5 (▲2)	5	5	5	5	6 (▼1)	6	7 (▼1)	7	7	6 (▲1)	7 (▼1)	7	7	7	7
France	4	4	4	5 (▼1)	5	5	5	5	6 (▼1)	6	6	8 (▼2)	8	6 (▲2)	6	8 (▼2)	7 (▲1)	9 (▼2)	9	9	8 (▲1)	8	8	8	8	8	11 (▼3)
Germany	18	18	18	18	19 (▼1)	19	22 (▼3)	24 (▼2)	23 (▲1)	23	28 (▼5)	28	30 (▼2)	30	35 (▼5)	31 (▲4)	29 (▲2)	25 (▲4)	21 (▲4)	21	22 (▼1)	22	27 (▼5)	26 (▲1)	23 (▲3)	23	24 (▼1)
Ghana	–	–	–	–	–	–	–	–	–	–	–	–	–	–	–	33	31 (▲2)	31	26 (▲5)	24 (▲2)	30 (▼6)	30	37 (▼7)	38 (▼1)	39 (▼1)	35 (▲4)	33 (▲2)
Greece	–	28	26 (▲2)	23 (▲3)	24 (▼1)	24	24	28 (▼4)	28	28	23 (▲5)	23	26 (▼3)	19 (▲7)	16 (▲3)	11 (▲5)	10 (▲1)	11 (▼1)	16 (▼5)	16	15 (▲1)	14 (▲1)	15 (▼1)	14 (▲1)	15 (▼1)	15	15
Hong Kong	–	–	–	–	–	–	–	–	–	–	–	45	45	40 (▲5)	39 (▲1)	–	–	–	–	–	–	50	47 (▲3)	48 (▼1)	48	48	48
Hungary	–	31	33 (▼2)	32 (▲1)	33 (▼1)	33	34 (▼1)	38 (▼4)	38	33 (▲5)	29 (▲4)	29	21 (▲8)	18 (▲3)	20 (▼2)	21 (▼1)	30 (▲9)	35 (▼5)	37 (▼2)	40 (▼3)	50 (▼10)	48 (▲2)	57 (▼9)	51 (▲6)	51	51	51
Ireland	9	9	10 (▼1)	7 (▲3)	7	6 (▲1)	6	7 (▼1)	8 (▼1)	7 (▲1)	8 (▼1)	11 (▼3)	11	12 (▼1)	12	12	12	12	11 (▲1)	12 (▼1)	16 (▼4)	16	18 (▼2)	18	14 (▲4)	14	14
Italy	13	12 (▲1)	12	12	12	12	13 (▼1)	15 (▼2)	13 (▲2)	14 (▼1)	12 (▲2)	13 (▼1)	13	13	14 (▼1)	13 (▲1)	16 (▼3)	17 (▼1)	14 (▲3)	14	13 (▼1)	13	17 (▼4)	17	17	17	18 (▼1)
Jamaica	22	23 (▼1)	24 (▼1)	27 (▼3)	29 (▼2)	27 (▲2)	27	16 (▲11)	17 (▼1)	17	13 (▲4)	15 (▼2)	15	14 (▲1)	13 (▲1)	20 (▼7)	18 (▲2)	21 (▼3)	13 (▲8)	15 (▼2)	18 (▼3)	18	19 (▼1)	20 (▼1)	18 (▲2)	18	19 (▼1)
Japan	–	–	–	–	–	–	–	–	–	–	–	41	41	34 (▲7)	34	–	–	–	45	44 (▲1)	38 (▲6)	39 (▲1)	41 (▼2)	42 (▼1)	43 (▼1)	42 (▲1)	42
Kenya	–	–	–	–	–	–	–	–	–	–	–	–	–	–	–	–	–	–	32	31 (▲1)	27 (▲4)	26 (▲1)	30 (▼4)	30	31 (▼1)	36 (▼5)	34 (▲2)
Latvia	25	–	31	33 (▼2)	34 (▼1)	34	35 (▼1)	36 (▼1)	36	39 (▼3)	42 (▼3)	47 (▼5)	47	48 (▼1)	–	45	47 (▼2)	48 (▼1)	50 (▼2)	51 (▼1)	54 (▼3)	53 (▲1)	51 (▲2)	52 (▼1)	52	52	52
Lebanon	16	20 (▼4)	21 (▼1)	21	20 (▲1)	20	20	21 (▼1)	21	21	18 (▲3)	9 (▲9)	9	9	9	10 (▼1)	13 (▼3)	13	8 (▲5)	8	9 (▼1)	9	16 (▼7)	16	21 (▼5)	20 (▲1)	23 (▼3)
Malta	21	22 (▼1)	23 (▼1)	24 (▼1)	23 (▲1)	18 (▲5)	18	20 (▼2)	20	19 (▲1)	17 (▲2)	18 (▼1)	18	16 (▲2)	17 (▼1)	16 (▲1)	15 (▲1)	10 (▲5)	19 (▼9)	19	14 (▲5)	15 (▼1)	13 (▲3)	13	16 (▼3)	16	16
Montenegro	–	–	–	–	–	–	–	–	–	–	–	–	–	–	–	–	–	44	39 (▲5)	38 (▲1)	36 (▲2)	32 (▲4)	32	32	35 (▼3)	34 (▲1)	35 (▼1)
Morocco	30	–	34	34	36 (▼2)	35 (▲1)	36 (▼1)	40 (▼4)	40	42 (▼2)	43 (▼1)	48 (▼5)	48	–	–	34	33 (▲1)	33	43 (▼10)	42 (▲1)	43 (▼1)	44 (▼1)	56 (▼12)	34 (▲22)	32 (▲2)	31 (▲1)	31
Netherlands	29	24 (▲5)	25 (▼1)	25	25	28 (▼3)	30 (▼2)	30	30	30	27 (▲3)	27	28 (▼1)	26 (▲2)	26	25 (▼1)	14 (▲9)	14	18 (▼4)	18	12 (▲6)	12	11 (▲1)	9 (▲2)	11 (▼2)	11	9 (▲2)
New Zealand	2	2	2	2	1 (▲1)	1	1	1	2 (▼1)	2	2	2	2	3 (▼1)	3	1 (▲2)	1	1	2 (▼1)	2	2	2	2	2	2	2	2
Nigeria	–	–	–	–	–	–	–	–	–	–	–	–	–	–	–	28	27 (▲1)	28 (▼1)	24 (▲4)	23 (▼1)	29 (▼6)	29	38 (▼9)	39 (▼1)	40 (▼1)	37 (▲3)	36 (▲1)
Niue	–	–	–	–	32	32	33 (▼1)	33	32 (▲1)	31 (▲1)	31	33 (▼2)	34 (▼1)	24 (▲10)	24	–	–	–	–	–	47	52 (▼5)	50 (▲2)	57 (▼7)	57	57	57
North Macedonia	–	–	–	–	–	–	–	–	–	–	–	–	–	–	–	–	–	–	–	–	42	35 (▲7)	33 (▲2)	33	33	32 (▲1)	37 (▼5)
Norway	20	19 (▲1)	19	19	21 (▼2)	26 (▼5)	26	26	26	26	22 (▲4)	22	19 (▲3)	20 (▼1)	18 (▲2)	17 (▲1)	20 (▼3)	23 (▼3)	35 (▼12)	34 (▲1)	28 (▲6)	25 (▲3)	28 (▼3)	27 (▲1)	22 (▲5)	21 (▲1)	26 (▼5)
Papua New Guinea	6	7 (▼1)	8 (▼1)	11 (▼3)	11	14 (▼3)	11 (▲3)	12 (▼1)	15 (▼3)	15	16 (▼1)	10 (▲6)	10	10	10	6 (▲4)	5 (▲1)	5	6 (▼1)	6	6	7 (▼1)	6 (▲1)	6	6	6	6
Philippines	–	–	–	–	35	–	32	32	33 (▼1)	34 (▼1)	34	24 (▲10)	27 (▼3)	22 (▲5)	22	–	26	24 (▲2)	29 (▼5)	33 (▼4)	23 (▲10)	27 (▼4)	23 (▲4)	24 (▼1)	27 (▼3)	26 (▲1)	28 (▼2)
Poland	–	–	–	–	–	–	–	–	–	–	–	–	–	23	23	19 (▲4)	21 (▼2)	22 (▼1)	30 (▼8)	29 (▲1)	24 (▲5)	24	25 (▼1)	25	20 (▲5)	19 (▲1)	22 (▼3)
Russia	14	15 (▼1)	14 (▲1)	15 (▼1)	16 (▼1)	15 (▲1)	16 (▼1)	18 (▼2)	16 (▲2)	16	19 (▼3)	19	20 (▼1)	29 (▼9)	29	37 (▼8)	35 (▲2)	37 (▼2)	–	–	–	45	45	46 (▼1)	45 (▲1)	45	45
Samoa	8	8	7 (▲1)	4 (▲3)	4	4	4	4	5 (▼1)	5	5	6 (▼1)	6	7 (▼1)	7	7	8 (▼1)	7 (▲1)	3 (▲4)	3	4 (▼1)	4	5 (▼1)	5	4 (▲1)	4	4
Scotland	11	11	11	8 (▲3)	8	9 (▼1)	9	9	4 (▲5)	4	4	7 (▼3)	7	8 (▼1)	8	9 (▼1)	11 (▼2)	15 (▼4)	17 (▼2)	17	19 (▼2)	19	22 (▼3)	22	28 (▼6)	27 (▲1)	20 (▲7)
Serbia	15	17 (▼2)	17	13 (▲4)	14 (▼1)	11 (▲3)	12 (▼1)	11 (▲1)	11	12 (▼1)	14 (▼2)	16 (▼2)	17 (▼1)	17	19 (▼2)	15 (▲4)	9 (▲6)	8 (▲1)	15 (▼7)	10 (▲5)	11 (▼1)	11	9 (▲2)	11 (▼2)	10 (▲1)	10	12 (▼2)
Solomon Islands	–	–	–	–	–	–	–	37	37	40 (▼3)	38 (▲2)	42 (▼4)	42	27 (▲15)	27	29 (▼2)	37 (▼8)	39 (▼2)	41 (▼2)	39 (▲2)	48 (▼9)	51 (▼3)	48 (▲3)	49 (▼1)	49	49	49
South Africa	24	25 (▼1)	29 (▼4)	31 (▼2)	28 (▲3)	31 (▼3)	31	31	31	32 (▼1)	33 (▼1)	35 (▼2)	32 (▲3)	37 (▼5)	37	36 (▲1)	38 (▼2)	30 (▲8)	25 (▲5)	26 (▼1)	25 (▲1)	28 (▼3)	26 (▲2)	28 (▼2)	26 (▲2)	28 (▼2)	29 (▼1)
Spain	–	–	28	28	26 (▲2)	21 (▲5)	21	19 (▲2)	19	20 (▼1)	21 (▼1)	21	22 (▼1)	28 (▼6)	30 (▼2)	26 (▲4)	28 (▼2)	29 (▼1)	33 (▼4)	32 (▲1)	37 (▼5)	38 (▼1)	42 (▼4)	43 (▼1)	44 (▼1)	43 (▲1)	43
Sweden	28	30 (▼2)	32 (▼2)	30 (▲2)	31 (▼1)	29 (▲2)	28 (▲1)	29 (▼1)	29	29	30 (▼1)	31 (▼1)	29 (▲2)	38 (▼9)	40 (▼2)	30 (▲10)	32 (▼2)	34 (▼2)	42 (▼8)	41 (▲1)	44 (▼3)	46 (▼2)	55 (▼9)	56 (▼1)	56	56	56
Thailand	–	–	–	–	–	–	–	–	–	35	36 (▼1)	38 (▼2)	38	–	44	–	–	–	–	–	–	–	–	–	–	–	–
Tonga	10	13 (▼3)	13	16 (▼3)	15 (▲1)	16 (▼1)	15 (▲1)	13 (▲2)	14 (▼1)	11 (▲3)	11	4 (▲7)	4	4	4	4	3 (▲1)	2 (▲1)	5 (▼3)	5	5	5	4 (▲1)	4	5 (▼1)	5	5
Turkey	–	–	–	–	–	–	–	–	–	–	–	–	–	31	31	24 (▲7)	19 (▲5)	19	20 (▼1)	20	32 (▼12)	34 (▼2)	39 (▼5)	40 (▼1)	37 (▲3)	39 (▼2)	39
Ukraine	23	21 (▲2)	20 (▲1)	20	22 (▼2)	23 (▼1)	23	23	22 (▲1)	22	25 (▼3)	25	25	35 (▼10)	37 (▼2)	39 (▼2)	25 (▲14)	26 (▼1)	28 (▼2)	28	20 (▲8)	20	14 (▲6)	15 (▼1)	12 (▲3)	12	10 (▲2)
United States	12	10 (▲2)	9 (▲1)	10 (▼1)	10	10	10	10	10	10	10	14 (▼4)	14	15 (▼1)	15	18 (▼3)	24 (▼6)	27 (▼3)	38 (▼11)	37 (▲1)	33 (▲4)	31 (▲2)	24 (▲7)	19 (▲5)	19	22 (▼3)	21 (▲1)
Uruguay	–	–	–	–	–	–	–	–	–	41	40 (▲1)	44 (▼4)	44	46 (▼2)	46	–	–	–	–	–	–	–	–	–	–	–	–
Vanuatu	–	–	–	–	–	–	–	35	35	37 (▼2)	35 (▲2)	36 (▼1)	36	33 (▲3)	32 (▲1)	35 (▼3)	40 (▼5)	42 (▼2)	46 (▼4)	46	51 (▼5)	57 (▼6)	49 (▲8)	50 (▼1)	50	50	50
Wales	5	6 (▼1)	6	9 (▼3)	9	8 (▲1)	8	8	9 (▼1)	9	9	12 (▼3)	12	11 (▲1)	11	14 (▼3)	23 (▼9)	16 (▲7)	10 (▼6)	11 (▼1)	17 (▼6)	17	12 (▲5)	12	13 (▼1)	13	13

=== Best and worst ===
As of 4 April 2026

Team	Best		Worst	
Team	Rank	Year(s)	Rank	Year(s)
Albania	35	2024	40	2024
Argentina	34	2024–25	52	2023
Australia	1	2012–15, 2016–19, 2022–25	4	2021
Belgium	17	2015–16	55	2024
Bosnia and Herzegovina	40	2022	47	2024–25
Brazil	22	2022	45	2018–19
Bulgaria	34	2022–23	48	2019
Cameroon	30	2023	38	2019
Canada	12	2016	46	2023
Chile	21	2024	43	2021
Colombia	36	2022–23	45	2021–22
Cook Islands	9	2025	43	2018
Czech Republic	17	2021	30	2014, 2015
Denmark	25	2015–16	54	2024
El Salvador	36	2018	47	2022–23
England	2	2018, 2019, 2021	5	2026
Estonia	27	2013	56	2024
Fiji	5	2013–14, 2017, 2019	8	2017
France	4	2013–14	9	2022–23
Germany	18	2013–14	35	2019
Ghana	24	2023	39	2025
Greece	10	2021	28	2013, 2016–17
Hong Kong	39	2019	50	2024
Hungary	18	2018	57	2024–25
Ireland	6	2015–16	18	2024–25
Italy	12	2013–15, 2017	17	2024–25
Jamaica	13	2017, 2019, 2022	29	2015
Japan	34	2018, 2019	45	2022
Kenya	26	2024	32	2022
Latvia	25	2013	54	2023
Lebanon	8	2022, 2023	21	2014, 2016–17
Malta	10	2022	24	2014
Montenegro	32	2024	44	2022
Morocco	30	2013	56	2024
Netherlands	9	2025	30	2016–17
New Zealand	1	2015–16, 2019-2021	3	2018, 2019
Nigeria	23	2023	40	2025
Niue	24	2018–19	57	2025
North Macedonia	33	2024–25	42	2023
Norway	17	2019	35	2022
Papua New Guinea	4	2012	16	2017
Philippines	22	2018–19	35	2015
Poland	19	2019	30	2022
Russia	14	2013, 2014	46	2025
Samoa	3	2022, 2023	8	2012–13
Scotland	4	2016–17	28	2025
Serbia	8	2021	19	2019
Solomon Islands	27	2018, 2019	51	2024
South Africa	24	2012–13	38	2021
Spain	19	2016	44	2025
Sweden	28	2012, 2016	56	2025
Thailand	35	2017	44	2019
Tonga	2	2022	16	2014, 2015
Turkey	19	2021, 2022	40	2025
Ukraine	12	2025	39	2019
United States	9	2014	38	2022
Uruguay	40	2017	46	2018, 2019
Vanuatu	32	2019	57	2024
Wales	5	2013	23	2021

== See also ==
- International Rugby League
- RLIF Awards
- IRL Women's World Rankings
- IRL Wheelchair World Rankings
