= Rugby league in Kenya =

Rugby League in Kenya is a growing spectator and participatory sport.

== History ==
During the 1990s attempts were made to introduce the sport of rugby league to Kenya. The catalyst for the attempt to introduce rugby league into Kenya came from Eddie Rombo, a former Kenyan rugby union player, who went on to play rugby league with British side Leeds Rhinos. After retiring from the sport, Rombo announced his intention to return to his native land and establish rugby league. In 2000, he did so, with the backing of a Kenyan businessman named Eric Murungi. Teams were formed, coaching sessions undertaken and a website set up. However the efforts came to nought, and no rugby league game was ever played.

In 2013, after seeing many of Kenya's youth missing the opportunity to participate in sport, Kenyan Caroline Jamieson along with husband Glenn Jamieson set up programs aimed at developing youth rugby league in Kenya, concentrating on the least fortunate. This new foray into the sport emphasized youth rugby league.

== Domestic Competitions ==
=== Kenya RL Premiership ===
- AP Warriors
- Centurion
- Knights
- Ngong
- Rhinos
- Ruffians
- Sharks
- Wolves

=== Kenya Women's League ===
- AP Warriors
- Wolves

== National team ==
The Kenya national rugby league team represent Kenya in the sport of rugby league football. The team is trying to qualify into 2025 Rugby League World Cup for the first time.

== See also ==
- Kenya national rugby league team
