= Rugby league sevens =

Version of rugby league football

- Highest governing body: Rugby League International Federation
- First played: 1961, Australia

Characteristics
- Contact: Full
- Team members: 12 (7 on field + 5 interchange)
- Mixed-sex: Single
- Type: Outdoor
- Equipment: Football
- Venue: Rugby league playing field

Rugby league sevens (or simply sevens) is a seven-a-side derivative of rugby league football, which is usually a thirteen-a-side sport. The game is substantially the same as full rugby league, with some rule changes and shorter games. Sevens is usually played in festivals, as its shorter game play allows for a tournament to be completed in a day or over a single weekend.

As well as being played by club sides, rugby league sevens is particularly popular with social teams, formed in the workplace or from the patrons of a public house for example, as it is often difficult in these places to form a full squad of 13 players and four substitutes of regular players. Some tournaments prefer to play rugby league nines (rugby league with nine players on each side) to distinguish it from rugby union sevens.

== History ==
The game of rugby sevens dates back to its invention by Ned Haig in Melrose in the Scottish Borders in 1883, just over a decade before the schism in rugby football in 1895, which led to the creation of rugby league and rugby union. However, rugby sevens did not spread outside Scotland before the 1920s. That said, the larger part of Scotland's rugby league players have come from Borders backgrounds.

The record rugby league sevens attendance remains the 80,000 that attended a 1933 match between Australia and England at Roundhay Park in Leeds. This match was also attended by English royalty.

The first rugby league sevens tournament was played in Australia in 1961.

The major tournament was the World Sevens played prior to the beginning of the National Rugby League season in Sydney, Australia. That tournament has been suspended but sevens is played around the world at different levels from junior teams to international ones. Sevens is considered to be a good tool to increase the skills of players and to help emerging rugby league nations.

== Playing area ==
Sevens is played on a standard rugby league playing field as defined in Section 1 of the International Laws of the Game.

== Teams ==
Teams are composed of three forwards, one half and three backs.

== Rules ==
Sevens follows the rules of 13-a-side rugby league with exceptions. Each rugby league nation is at liberty to adopt a modified version of international rugby league rules for their own domestic competitions; as a result the rules of rugby league sevens can vary too, even before changes implemented by competition organisers.

Matches have two halves of seven minutes. Unlimited substitutions are allowed from a squad totalling 12 players. In sevens, smaller scrums, formed from the three forwards on each team, are formed. All kicks for goal should be drop kicks in sevens. After points have been scored a tap kick restart is taken by the non-scoring side.

The World Sevens, the world's premier sevens event while it operated, had two 7 minute halves up to and including the semi-finals with extra time played in the event of tie at the end normal time. The final was longer with two 10-minute halves. In 2004, the World Sevens tackle limit was reduced from 6 to 4.

== Major sevens festivals ==
- World Sevens was suspended in 2005 because NRL teams were reluctant to field their star players, resulting in dwindling spectator numbers. Play resumed
- Actor Russell Crowe hosts the Orara Valley Axemen Sevens Tournament at Coffs Harbour on the New South Wales North Coast. This tournament is participated in by teams representing countries of the world, local clubs and a few clubs from Brisbane, Australia. In 2005 the Souths Logan Magpies from the Queensland Wizard Cup and the Gold Coast Titans, who entered the NRL in 2007, were two well known clubs that participated.
- Latino Rugby League Sevens

== See also ==
- Rugby league nines
- Rugby sevens (a form of rugby union)
