= El Salvador national rugby league team =

National rugby team of El Salvador

El Salvador
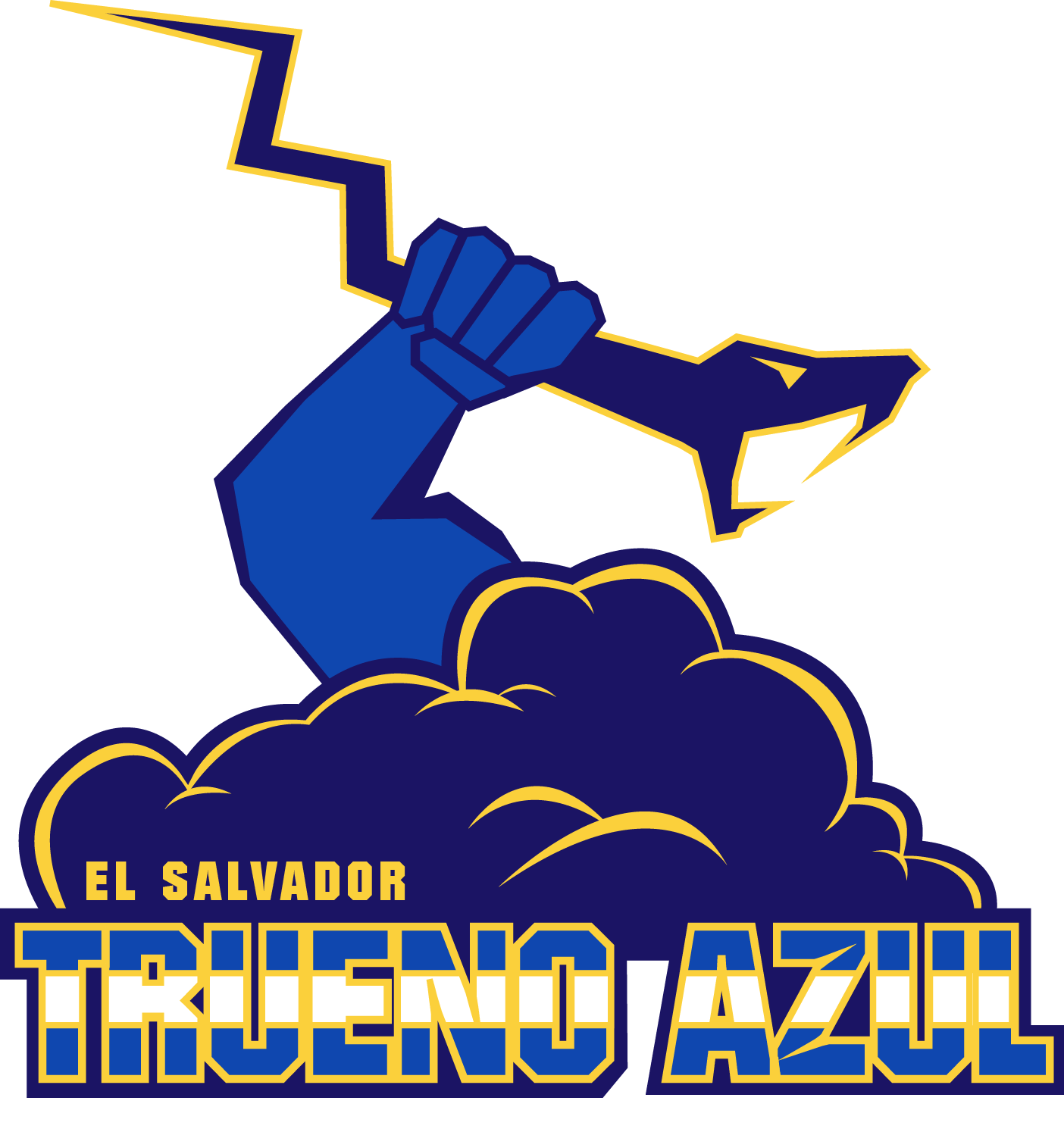

Team information
- Nickname: El Trueno Azul
- Governing body: -
- Region: -
- Head coach: Fredy Salvador Arteaga Figueroa
- Captain: Alvaro Alarcon
- Most caps: Eric Orellana
- Top try-scorer: Daniel Godinez (5)
- Top point-scorer: Alvaro Alarcon, Daniel Godinez (20)
- IRL ranking: 46th

Team results
- First international
- Chile 58–20 El Salvador (Sydney, Australia; 31 January 2015)
- Biggest win
- Colombia 10-48 El Salvador (Rochedale, Brisbane; 21 October 2018)
- Biggest defeat
- Chile 58–20 El Salvador (Sydney, Australia; 31 January 2015)
- World Cup
- Appearances: 0 (first time in -)
- Best result: -

The El Salvador national rugby league team (Spanish: rugby league equipo nacional de El Salvador), nicknamed El Trueno Azul (English: Blue Thunder), represents El Salvador in rugby league. They had their first international 9's tournament in 2015 in Australia along with Chile in Latin America at the Cabramatta International Nines.

== History ==
Rugby league Has yet to be played on El Salvador soil but efforts are in place to bring rugby league to Central and South America through the Latin Heat Rugby League. In the very first full Latino team 4 Salvadorans were included. After the Latin Heat fielded enough Salvadoran players to make up a Rugby league nines team they entered into the Cabramatta International Nines tournament in 2015.

On 17 October 2015 The El Salvador national rugby league team debuted in the Latino Rugby League Sevens Tournament on 17 October 2015. They finished 1-1.

The El Salvador national rugby league team entered the 2016 Cabramatta International Nines on 30 January with a 15-man squad. Their pool consisted of Ireland, DV Koori and Malta.

On 11 June 2016 The Trueno Azul made their full 13-a-side debut playing latino rivals Chile at Henson Park, Sydney. El Salvador lost 58-20.

== Current squad ==
The El Salvador national team selected for the 2016 Cabramatta International Nines tournament were:

Other Nat.	Pos.	Player	Date of birth (age)	Caps	Pts
Australia	Wing	Javier Alarcon	20 July 1995 (age 30)	3	0
Australia	Wing	Eric Orellana	3 June 1991 (age 34)	8	0
Australia	Centre,Second-row	Michael Alarcon	14 February 1995 (age 30)	5	4
Australia	Centre,Wing	Michael Zamora-Rivera	19 June 1991 (age 34)	3	0
Australia	Five-eighth	Miguel Gonzalez	31 August 1990 (age 35)	3	4
Australia	Halfback	Alvaro Alarcon	21 February 1991 (age 34)	5	20
Australia	Prop	Fredy Artega Figueroa	22 March 1981 (age 44)	5	6
Australia	Prop	JC Mendez	29 January 1993 (age 33)	5	0
Australia	Prop	Josh Guzman	1 September 1998 (age 27)	8	0
Australia	Prop	Roque-Joel Perez Mejia	13 December 1988 (age 37)	6	0
Australia	Hooker	Ronnie Rivas	18 June 1983 (age 42)	6	0
Australia	Second-row	Walter Godinez	23 November 1974 (age 51)	8	0
USA	Second-row	Edgar Ayala	28 August 1992 (age 33)	3	0
Australia	Second-row	Junior Alarcon	31 July 1997 (age 28)	5	4
Australia	Lock	Daniel Godinez	31 March 1985 (age 40)	6	20

== Competitive record ==
Below is table of the representative rugby league nines matches played by El Salvador up until 12 October 2015:

Opponent	Played	Won	Lost	Drawn	Win %	For	Aga	Diff
American Samoa	1	-	1	-	0%	4	46	-42
Chile	1	-	1	-	0%	20	34	-14
Malta	1	-	1	-	0%	4	30	-26
Niue	1	-	1	-	0%	10	24	-14
Thailand	1	-	1	-	0%	10	20	-10
Uruguay	1	1	0	-	100%	22	14	8
Total	5	1	4	-	17.667%	70	164	-98

The following is a table of full 13-a-side test matches.

Opponent	Played	Won	Lost	Drawn	Win %	For	Aga	Diff
Chile	1	-	1	-	0%	20	58	-38
Uruguay	1	-	1	-	0%	46	10	36
Total	1	0	1	-	0%	20	58	-38

== IRL Rankings ==
IRL Men's World Rankings
Official rankings as of November 2025
Rank	Change	Team	Pts %
1	Steady	Australia	100
2	Steady	New Zealand	79
3	Steady	England	72
4	▲1	Samoa	56
5	▼1	Tonga	52
6	Steady	Papua New Guinea	45
7	Steady	Fiji	33
8	Steady	France	23
9	▲1	Cook Islands	23
10	▲1	Serbia	23
11	▼2	Netherlands	22
12	▲3	Ukraine	20
13	▼1	Wales	18
14	▲4	Ireland	16
15	▼1	Greece	15
16	▼3	Malta	14
17	Steady	Italy	11
18	▲2	Jamaica	8
19	Steady	United States	7
20	▲5	Poland	7
21	▼5	Lebanon	7
22	▲5	Norway	6
23	▲3	Germany	6
24	▼3	Czech Republic	6
25	▼2	Chile	6
26	▲2	South Africa	5
27	▼3	Philippines	5
28	▼6	Scotland	5
29	Steady	Brazil	4
30	▲1	Canada	4
31	▼1	Kenya	3
32	▲2	Morocco	3
33	Steady	North Macedonia	3
34	▲1	Argentina	2
35	▼3	Montenegro	2
36	Steady	Albania	1
37	▲3	Turkey	1
38	▼1	Bulgaria	1
39	▼1	Ghana	1
40	▼1	Nigeria	1
41	▲3	Colombia	0
42	▼1	Cameroon	0
43	▼1	Japan	0
44	▼1	Spain	0
45	▲1	Russia	0
46	▼1	El Salvador	0
47	Steady	Bosnia and Herzegovina	0
48	Steady	Hong Kong	0
49	Steady	Solomon Islands	0
50	Steady	Vanuatu	0
51	Steady	Hungary	0
52	Steady	Latvia	0
53	Steady	Denmark	0
54	Steady	Belgium	0
55	Steady	Estonia	0
56	Steady	Sweden	0
57	Steady	Niue	0
Complete rankings at www.internationalrugbyleague.com

== See also ==
- Chile national rugby league team
- Rugby league in the Americas
