= Bulgaria national rugby league team =

Bulgaria

Team information
- Governing body: Bulgarian Rugby League Federation
- Region: Europe
- Head coach: Adrien Frigola
- Top try-scorer: Antonio Lubenov (3)
- Top point-scorer: Antonio Lubenov (12)
- IRL ranking: 40th

Team results
- First international
- Bulgaria 8 - 68 Greece (Belgrade, Serbia; 6 October 2017)
- Biggest defeat
- Malta 78 - 0 Bulgaria (Marsa, Malta; 23 September 2023)
- World Cup
- Appearances: 0

The Bulgaria national rugby league team represents Bulgaria in the sport of rugby league football, having made their international debut at the 2017 Balkans Cup against Greece and Serbia in October 2017.

== Results ==
Date	Result (Note: Bulgaria score given first)	Opponent	Competition	Venue	Ref.
6 October 2017	8–68	Greece	2017 Balkans Cup	SC Rakovica, Belgrade, Serbia	
8 October 2017	20–50	Serbia	2017 Balkans Cup	SC Rakovica, Belgrade, Serbia	
10 June 2021	16–28	Serbia	International Friendly	FC Trebich, Sofia, Bulgaria	
25 September 2022	16–38	Turkey	International Friendly	ITU Stadium, Istanbul, Turkey	
8 October 2022	6–50	Malta	International Friendly	Stadion Lokomotiv Sofia, Bulgaria	
23 September 2023	0–78	Malta	International Friendly	Marsa, Malta	

== IRL Rankings ==
IRL Men's World Rankings
Official rankings as of December 2025
Rank	Change	Team	Pts %
1	Steady	Australia	100
2	Steady	New Zealand	82
3	Steady	England	74
4	Steady	Samoa	56
5	Steady	Tonga	54
6	Steady	Papua New Guinea	47
7	Steady	Fiji	34
8	Steady	France	24
9	Steady	Cook Islands	24
10	Steady	Serbia	23
11	Steady	Netherlands	22
12	Steady	Ukraine	21
13	Steady	Wales	18
14	Steady	Ireland	17
15	Steady	Greece	15
16	Steady	Malta	15
17	Steady	Italy	11
18	Steady	Jamaica	9
19	▲1	Poland	7
20	▲1	Lebanon	7
21	▲1	Norway	7
22	▼3	United States	7
23	Steady	Germany	7
24	Steady	Czech Republic	6
25	Steady	Chile	6
26	▲1	Philippines	5
27	▲1	Scotland	5
28	▼2	South Africa	5
29	▲1	Canada	5
30	▼1	Brazil	3
31	▲1	Morocco	3
32	▲1	North Macedonia	3
33	▲1	Argentina	3
34	▲1	Montenegro	3
35	▲4	Ghana	2
36	▼5	Kenya	2
37	▲3	Nigeria	2
38	▼2	Albania	1
39	▼2	Turkey	1
40	▼2	Bulgaria	1
41	▲1	Cameroon	0
42	▲1	Japan	0
43	▲1	Spain	0
44	▼3	Colombia	0
45	Steady	Russia	0
46	Steady	El Salvador	0
47	Steady	Bosnia and Herzegovina	0
48	Steady	Hong Kong	0
49	Steady	Solomon Islands	0
50	Steady	Vanuatu	0
51	Steady	Hungary	0
52	Steady	Latvia	0
53	Steady	Denmark	0
54	Steady	Belgium	0
55	Steady	Estonia	0
56	Steady	Sweden	0
57	Steady	Niue	0
Complete rankings at www.internationalrugbyleague.com
