= Forshaw Park =

Rugby stadium in Sylvania Waters, New South Wales, Australia

- Interactive map of Forshaw Park
- Location: Belgrave Esplanade, Sylvania Waters, N.S.W
- Coordinates: 34°1′28″S 151°6′41″E
- Operator: Southern Districts Rugby Club
- Capacity: 2,000
- Surface: Grass

Tenant
- Southern Districts Rugby Club (NSWRU) (1989-present)

Forshaw Park is a rugby stadium in Sylvania Waters, New South Wales, Australia. It is located just 28 km south of the City of Sydney. The ground can hold 2,000 people.

== Ground usage ==
It has been the home ground to the Southern Districts Rugby Club since 1989.
