= Uruguay national rugby league team =

Uruguay

Team information
- Nickname: Gauchos Uruguayos (English: Uruguayan Gauchos)
- Governing body: -
- Region: -
- Head coach: Adam Wright
- Most caps: -
- Top try-scorer: Julio Toledo
- Top point-scorer: Julio Toledo

Uniforms
First colours

Team results
- First international
- Hungary 50–4 Uruguay (Sydney, Australia; 4 Feb 2017)
- Biggest defeat
- Brazil 60–0 Uruguay (Sydney, Australia; 28 Feb 2021)
- World Cup
- Appearances: -0 (first time in -)
- Best result: -

The Uruguay national rugby league team (Spanish: rugby league equipo nacional de Uruguay), nicknamed Gauchos Uruguayos (English: Uruguayan Gaucho), represents Uruguay in rugby league and made their debut at the first Latino Sevens on 17 October 2015.

== Current squad ==
The following is the current Uruguayan squad:

- Angel Morrison III (c)
- Eric Rendo
- Josh Gadea-Hellyer
- Niko Cama
- Matt Cama
- Steven Clarke
- Gabriel Papa
- Julio Toledo
- Michael Leon
- Matty Booth
- Pablo Florentin
- Andres Rossini
- Javier Britos
- Noah Cama
- Luke Morrissey
- Kevin Clarke
- Kristofer Vieira
- Diego Papa
- Nico Papa
- Ryan Kungl
- Gabriel Hernandez

== Record ==
Below is table of the representative rugby league matches played by Uruguay at test level up until 14 June 2019:

Opponent	Played	Won	Lost	Drawn	Win %	For	Aga	Diff
Brazil	1	0	1	0	0%	0	60	-60
Chile	1	0	1	0	0%	4	20	-16
Colombia	1	0	0	0	0%	0	0	0
El Salvador	1	0	1	0	0%	14	22	-8
Hungary	1	0	1	0	0%	4	50	-46
Peru	2	2	0	0	100	34	22	+12
Total	6	2	4					
