= Portugal national rugby league team =

Portugal
Team information
- Nickname: "Os Navegadores"
- Governing body: PRL - Portugal Rugby League, APD
- Region: Europe
- Head coach: (Portugal) Emmanuel De Jesus

Uniforms
First colours

Team results
- First international
- Fiji A 40–4 Portugal (Parramatta, Australia; 8 October 2005)
- Biggest win
- Portugal 28–16 Japan (Sefton, Australia; 6 February 2008)
- Biggest defeat
- Portugal 6–64 Malta (Fairfield, Australia; 17 October 2009)

The Portugal national rugby league team (nicknamed Os Navegadores) is the national rugby league team of Portugal.

In June 2025, Portugal Rugby League announced its intention to become observer members of International Rugby League (IRL) and European Rugby League (ERL). Portugal was admitted as an observer member of the IRL in June 2026, (Note: Portugal had previously been granted observer status by the Rugby League European Federation in c. 2006.)

== History ==
=== 2000s ===
The Portuguese Rugby League Association (PRLA) was established in January 2005. Based in Marrickville, Sydney, Australia, the founder of the PRLA is an Australian born rugby league supporter, who married into a Portuguese family.

The first meeting of the PRLA was held at the Henson Park Hotel on early September 2005 and was attended by players who would form the nucleus of the team for the first match.

Portugal's first match was played against Fiji A, one month later, at Granville Park, on 8 October 2005, as part of the Fiji National Day Celebrations. The team was captained by Isaac de Gois, featuring his brothers Eric and Aaron, as well as their cousin, Fábio de Gois. Born in Madeira, Fábio was playing his first match of rugby league. Ivan Pacho has the honour of scoring Portugal's first try, in a 40–4 loss.

In 2006, the PRLA entered the team in two sevens tournaments (VB Sevens @ St Marys and the Illawarra Sevens in Wollongong) as well as accepting an offer to play against touring teams from Britain (Great Britain Armed Forces and the British Royal Armoured Corps).

In 2007, Portugal's featured in the VB Sevens at St Marys in February and in October, an International friendly against Malta.

In April 2007, PRLA Executive met with the officials from the Portuguese Rugby Union, who were in Australia for the IRB World Sevens Rugby Tournament. The meeting proved fruitful, with a sporting alliance being established between the two codes.

In February 2008, Portugal competed in the Cabramatta International Nines and the Illawarra Sevens as well as an International friendly against Japan in Sydney.

In November 2008, Portugal defeated Cumberland Beavers 34–4. Samuel Belo won his first international cap during this time and scored two tries, in his one and only cap for Portugal.

In October 2009, Portugal took on Malta in the Mediterranean Shield. Portugal would suffer their biggest defeat up to date, losing the match 64–6.

=== 2010s ===
In 2012, Portugal played in the Cabramatta International Nines tournament. In 2013, Portugal played another International friendly against Japan in Sydney. Portugal won the match in a tight 26-20 result, also withstanding a late Japanese attacking effort on the hooter.

=== 2026 ===
Portugal Rugby League officially established and created its entity in Lisboa, as per IRL rules, co-founded by Emmanuel De Jesus, Cristina Capodici, Elizabeth De Jesus, Christina Sanchez De Beggs.

The team played against French Police, in Lisbon, ending 52-22 in favour of the French. The fielded team was Captained by Luis Rowe, and the try scorers were Jaryd De Jager, Phillip Daniel Castro (2), and Duarte Mendes.

== Results and fixtures ==
- Fiji defeated Portugal 40–4, 8 October 2005
- Great Britain Armed Forces defeated Portugal 66–6, 21 April 2006
- British Royal Armoured Corps defeated Portugal 17–8, 12 October 2006
- Malta defeated Portugal 56–12, 6 October 2007
- Portugal defeated Japan 28–16, 6 February 2008
- Portugal defeated Cumberland Beavers 34–4, 1 November 2008
- Greece defeated Portugal 42–16, 10 October 2009
- Malta defeated Portugal 62–6, 17 October 2009
- Portugal defeated Japan 26–20, 31 January 2013
- Latin Heat defeated Portugal 40–6, 19 October 2014
