= Malta national rugby league team =

Malta

Team information
- Nickname: Kavallieri (The Knights)
- Governing body: Maltese Rugby League Association
- Region: Europe
- Head coach: Aaron McDonald ('A' Team)
- Captain: Tyler Cassel
- Most caps: Jarrod Sammut (16)
- Home stadium: Charles Abela Memorial Stadium
- IRL ranking: 16th

Uniforms
First colours	Second colours

Team results
- First game
- Malta 78-0 British Defence Forces (United Kingdom) (25 September 2004)
- Biggest win
- Malta 82–0 Japan (25 January 2007, Coffs Harbour, Australia)
- Biggest defeat
- Malta 0-62 Lancashire Amateurs (17 October 2010, Ħamrun, Malta)
- World Cup
- Appearances: 0

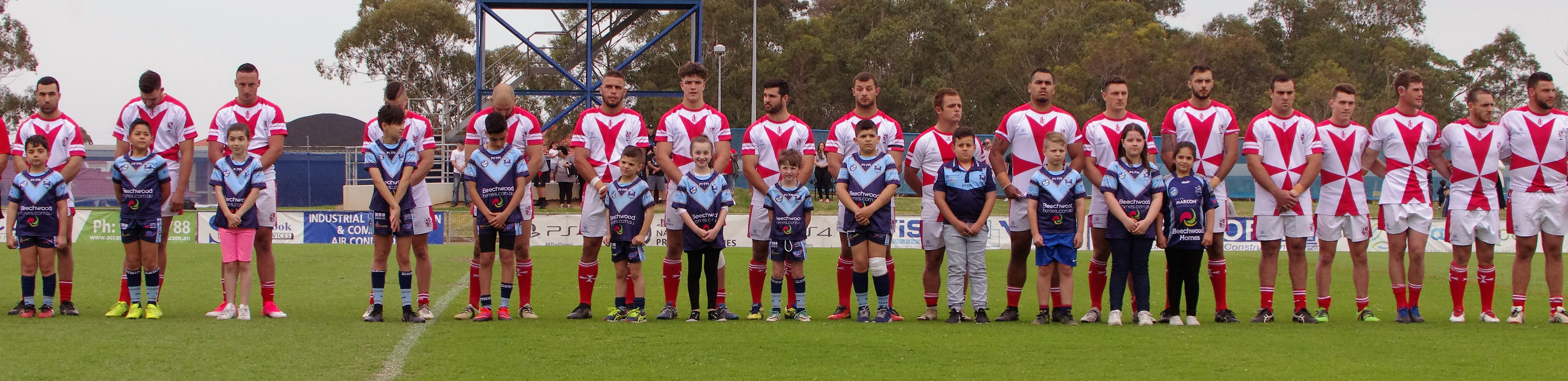
Malta lining up for a match against Italy ahead of the 2017 World Cup

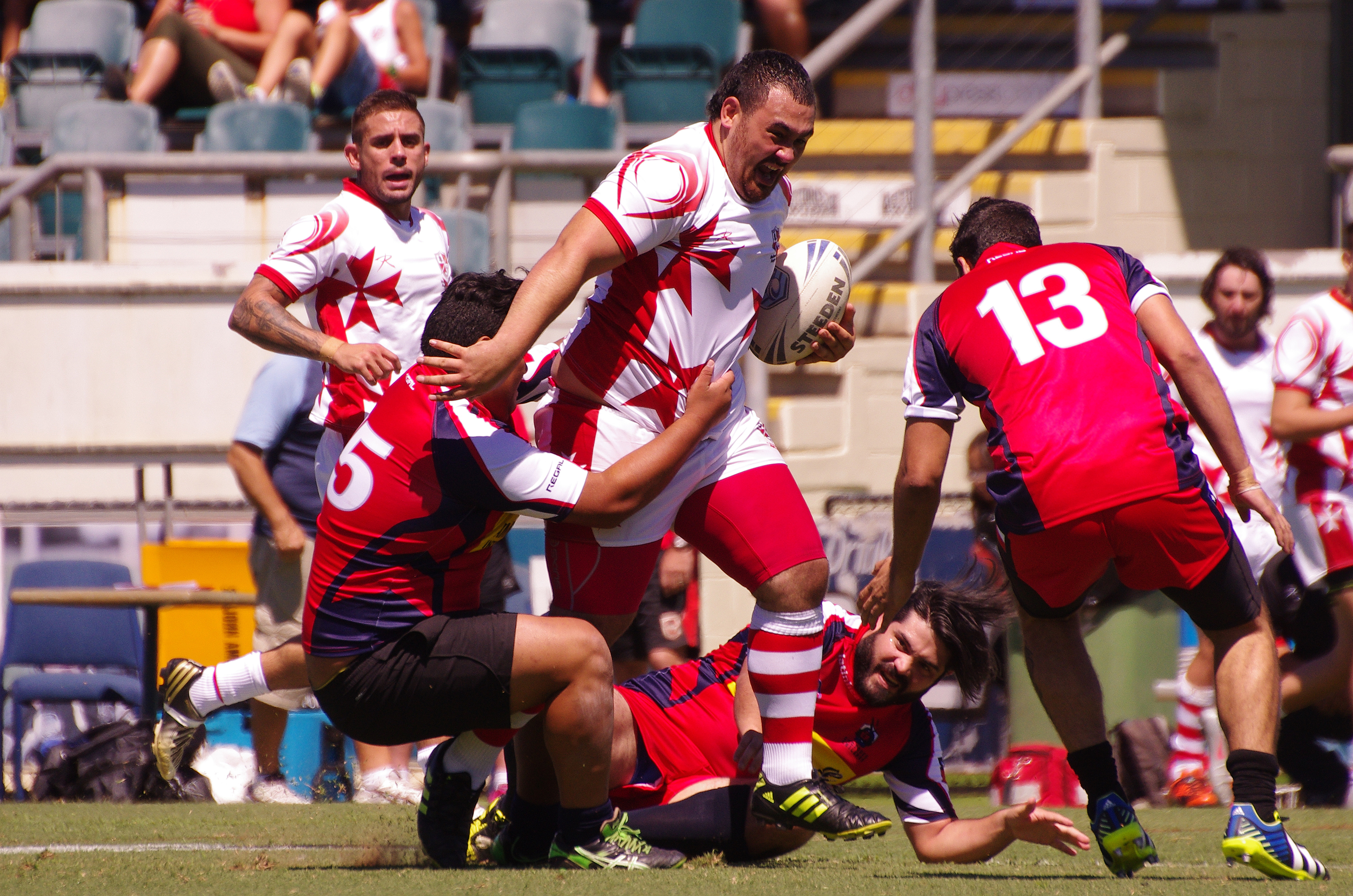
Malta in action against Chile in 2015

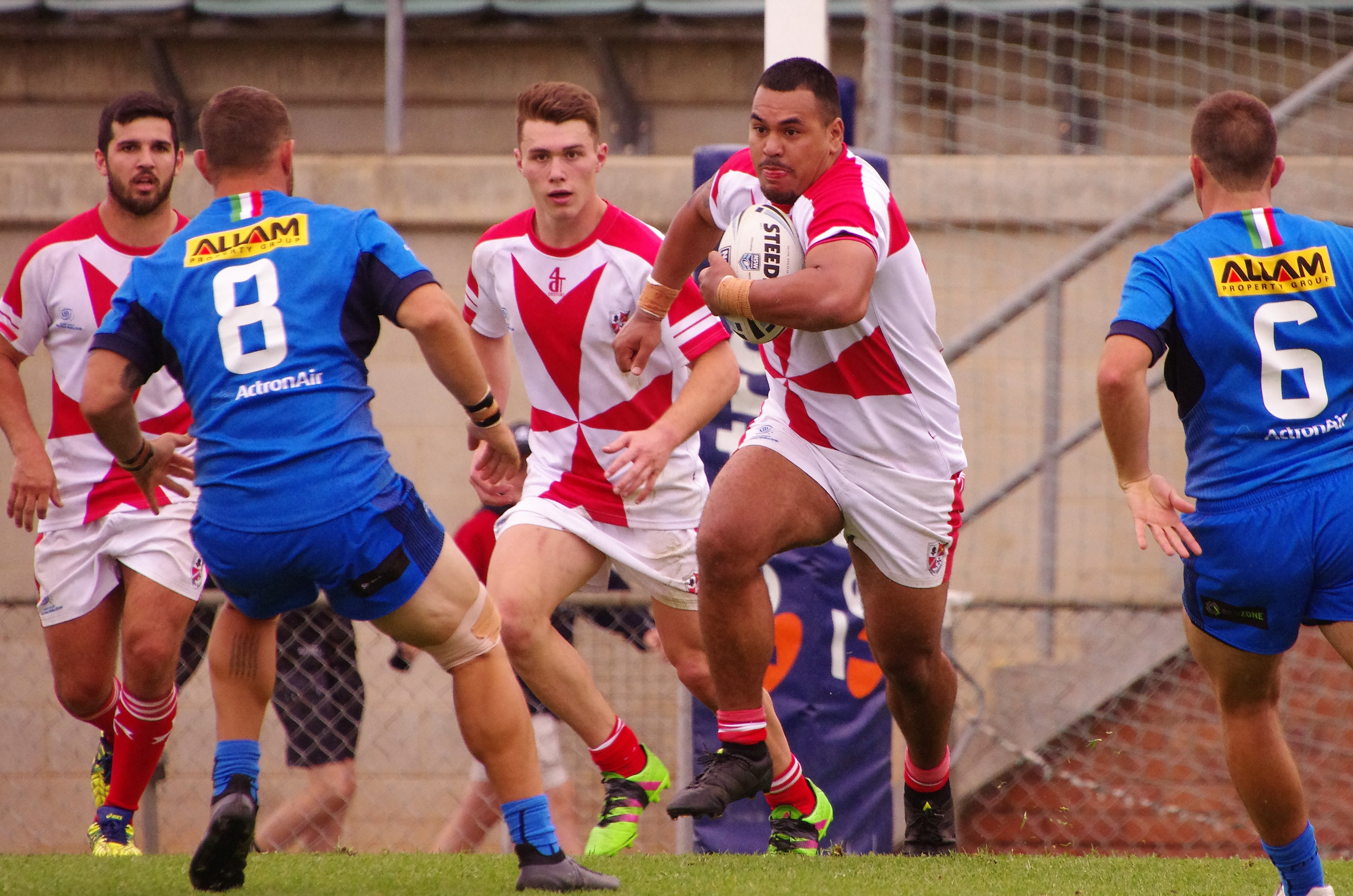
Malta in action against Italy in 2017

The Malta national rugby league team (nicknamed the Knights) represent Malta in international rugby league football competitions. They have been competing since 2004.

== List of Head Coaches ==
- Joey Grima 2005–06 (5 matches, 3 wins, 2 losses)
- Tony Farr 2007 (1 match)
- Anthony Micallef 2008–2015 (12 matches, 7 wins, 5 losses)
- Peter Cassar 2017 (1 match, 0 wins, 1 draw, 0 losses)
- Aaron McDonald 2017– (12 matches, 9 wins, 3 losses)
- Sam Blyton-Keep 2017–2018 (3 matches, 0 wins, 3 losses)
- James Camilleri 2018 (1 match, 0 wins, 1 loss)
- Roderick Attard 2021– (3 matches, 1 win, 2 losses)

== Competitive record ==
Below is table of the official representative rugby league matches played by Malta at test level up until 18 October 2026:

Team	First Played	Played	Win	Draw	Loss	Points For	Points Against	Last Meeting
Belgium	2015	1	1	0	0	35	34	2015
Bulgaria	2022	1	1	0	0	50	6	2022
Chile	2023	1	1	0	0	30	22	2023
Czech Republic	2014	2	1	0	1	50	48	2021
Denmark	2012	2	2	0	0	98	24	2012
Germany	2011	1	0	0	1	12	36	2011
Greece	2014	3	1	0	2	52	92	2018
Hungary	2017	3	3	0	0	108	26	2018
Ireland	2015	2	0	0	2	32	92	2016
Italy	2017	4	2	1	1	101	82	2024
Japan	2007	1	1	0	0	82	0	2007
Lebanon	2017	2	0	0	2	54	22	2022
Montenegro	2022	2	1	0	0	100	16	2023
Niue	2018	2	1	0	1	40	42	2018
North Macedonia	2024	1	1	0	0	22	18	2023
Norway	2010	2	2	0	0	94	44	2011
Philippines	2017	5	3	0	2	172	116	2024
South Africa	2018	1	0	0	1	24	30	2018
Spain	2015	1	0	0	1	30	40	2015
Turkey	2019	2	1	0	1	40	48	2021
Ukraine	2018	1	0	0	1	22	34	2018
Total		41	25	1	15	1312	864	

=== Results ===
Date	Score (Note: Malta score given first)	Opponent	Competition	Venue	Report
16 October 2004	24–40	Fiji A	Friendly	Melita Stadium, Sydney, Australia	
8 October 2005	24–22	Greece	Friendly	Gabbie Stadium, Sydney, Australia	
8 October 2006	10–36	Lebanon	Friendly	Western Weekender Stadium, Sydney, Australia	
25 January 2007	82–0	Japan	Friendly	Coffs Harbour International Stadium, Coffs Harbour, Australia	
6 October 2007	58–12	Portugal	Friendly	Western Weekender Stadium, Sydney, Australia	
10 October 2009	10–34	Italy A	Friendly	Marconi Stadium, Sydney, Australia	
17 October 2009	62–6	Portugal	Friendly	Marconi Stadium, Sydney, Australia	
4 June 2010	30–20	Norway	2010 Euro C	Victor Tedesco Stadium, Ħamrun, Malta	
17 October 2010	0–62	Lancashire Amateurs	Friendly	Victor Tedesco Stadium, Ħamrun, Malta	
23 July 2011	12–36	Germany	2011 Euro B	Hochspeyer, Kaiserslautern, Germany	
2 September 2011	64–24	Norway	2011 Euro B	Melita FC, Pembroke, Malta	
9 June 2012	24–12	Denmark	Friendly	Victor Tedesco Stadium, Ħamrun, Malta	
29 September 2012	74–12	Denmark	Friendly	Gentofte Stadium, Copenhagen, Denmark	
28 June 2014	18–32	Greece	2014 Euro C	Melita FC, Pembroke, Malta	
12 July 2014	34–8	Czech Republic	2014 Euro C	Tis RL, Havlichkuv Brod, Czech Republic	
3 May 2015	16–38	Lebanon	Phoenicia Cup	Penarth, Australia	
21 June 2015	35–34	Belgium	Friendly	Headingley Carnegie Stadium, Leeds, England	
5 September 2015	22–34	Ireland	Friendly	Melita FC Stadium, Pembroke, Malta	
27 September 2015	30–40	Spain	2015 Euro C	Polideportivo Cuatre Carreres Stadium, Valencia, Spain	
10 October 2015	30–0	Greece	2015 Euro C	Matthew Micallef St. John Athletics Stadium, Marsa, Malta	
8 October 2016	10–58	Ireland	Friendly	Carlisle Grounds, Bray, Ireland	
4 February 2017	44–26	Philippines	Friendly	New Era Stadium, Sydney, Australia	
6 May 2017	8–24	Lebanon	Phoenicia Cup	New Era Stadium, Sydney, Australia	
8 October 2017	24–24	Italy	Friendly	Marconi Stadium, Sydney, Australia	
14 October 2017	48–16	Hungary	Friendly	New Era Stadium, Sydney, Australia	
18 February 2018	40–0	Hungary	Friendly	St. Mary's Stadium, St. Mary's, Australia	
23 June 2018	24–30	South Africa	Friendly	St. Mary's Stadium, St. Mary's, Australia	
30 June 2018	22–34	Ukraine	2018 Euro C	Matthew Micallef St. John Athletics Stadium, Marsa, Malta	
15 September 2018	4–60	Greece	2018 Euro C	Glyka Stadium, Athens, Greece	
1 October 2018	36–10	Philippines	2018 ENWC	Windsor Sporting Complex, Windsor, Australia	
4 October 2018	16–26	Niue	2018 ENWC	St. Mary's Stadium, St. Mary's, Australia	
10 October 2018	20–10	Hungary	2018 ENWC	New Era Stadium, Sydney, Australia	
13 October 2018	24–16	Niue	2018 ENWC	St. Mary's Stadium, St. Mary's, Australia	
12 October 2019	23–20	Italy	Friendly	Kirkham Oval, Sydney, Australia	
26 October 2019	28–12	Turkey	Friendly	New Era Stadium, Sydney, Australia	
23 November 2019	16–34	Wales A	Friendly	Brewery Field, Bridgend, Wales	
14 October 2021	16–40	Czech Republic	2021 Euro D	Huseyin AkarTesisleri Stadium, Bodrum, Türkiye	
17 October 2021	12–36	Turkey	2021 Euro D	Huseyin Akar Tesisleri Stadium, Bodrum, Türkiye	
14 May 2022	66–6	Montenegro	Medieval Shield	Charles Abela Memorial Stadium, Mosta, Malta	
22 June 2022	14–30	Lebanon	Friendly	Belmore Oval, Belmore, Australia	
8 October 2022	50–6	Bulgaria	Friendly	Lokomotiv Sofia, Bulgaria	
23 October 2022	22–32	Philippines	Friendship Cup	New Era Stadium, Sydney, Australia	
16 September 2023	34–10	Montenegro	Medieval Shield	FK Arsenal Stadium, Tivat, Montenegro	
23 September 2023	78–0	Bulgaria	Friendly	Marsa Sports Complex, Marsa, Malta	
7 October 2023	12–38	Italy	Friendly	Lidcombe Oval, Sydney, Australia	
21 October 2023	30–22	Chile	Friendly	Forshaw Rugby Park, Sydney, Australia	
28 October 2023	46–22	Philippines	Friendship Cup	New Era Stadium, Sydney, Australia	
18 February 2024	22–18	North Macedonia	Friendly	Forshaw Rugby Park, Sydney, Australia	
28 September 2024	42–0	Italy	Friendly	A.S.D. Juvenilia, Bagnaria Arsa, Italy	
26 October 2024	24–26	Philippines	Friendly	New Era Stadium, Sydney, Australia	
18 October 2025	6–36	Netherlands	2025 Euro B	Marsa Sports Complex, Marsa, Malta	
1 November 2025	12–52	Serbia	2025 Euro B	FK BSK Borca, Belgrade, Serbia	
3 October 2026	29–28	Germany	2026 Euro C	Sportplatz Welper, Hattingen, Germany	
10 October 2026	18–20	Greece	2026 Euro C	Hibernians Rugby Pitch, Paola, Malta	

== IRL Rankings ==
IRL Men's World Rankings
Official rankings as of August 2026
Rank	Change	Team	Pts %
1	Steady	Australia	100
2	Steady	New Zealand	82
3	Steady	England	70
4	Steady	Samoa	56
5	Steady	Tonga	54
6	Steady	Papua New Guinea	47
7	Steady	Fiji	34
8	▲1	Cook Islands	24
9	▲2	Netherlands	23
10	▲2	Ukraine	21
11	▼3	France	21
12	▼2	Serbia	20
13	Steady	Wales	18
14	Steady	Ireland	17
15	Steady	Greece	14
16	Steady	Malta	14
17	▲12	Canada	13
18	▼1	Italy	11
19	▼1	Jamaica	9
20	▲7	Scotland	8
21	▲1	United States	8
22	▼3	Poland	7
23	▼3	Lebanon	7
24	▼1	Germany	7
25	▼1	Czech Republic	6
26	▼5	Norway	6
27	▼2	Chile	5
28	▲2	Philippines	5
29	▼1	South Africa	4
30	Steady	Brazil	3
31	Steady	Morocco	3
32	▲1	Argentina	3
33	▲2	Ghana	2
34	▲2	Kenya	2
35	▼1	Montenegro	2
36	▲1	Nigeria	2
37	▼5	North Macedonia	1
38	Steady	Albania	1
39	Steady	Turkey	1
40	Steady	Bulgaria	1
41	Steady	Cameroon	0
42	Steady	Japan	0
43	Steady	Spain	0
44	Steady	Colombia	0
45	Steady	Russia	0
46	Steady	El Salvador	0
47	Steady	Bosnia and Herzegovina	0
48	Steady	Hong Kong	0
49	Steady	Solomon Islands	0
50	Steady	Vanuatu	0
51	Steady	Hungary	0
52	Steady	Latvia	0
53	Steady	Denmark	0
54	Steady	Belgium	0
55	Steady	Estonia	0
56	Steady	Sweden	0
57	Steady	Niue	0
Complete rankings at www.internationalrugbyleague.com

== Honours ==
- Emerging Nations: Winners (1): 2018
- Euro C: Winners (1): 2010

== See also ==
- Rugby league in Malta
