= Chile national rugby league team =

Chile

Team information
- Nickname: Weichafes
- Governing body: Futbol a 13 Chile
- Region: Americas
- Head coach: Rodrigo Millar
- Captain: Nick Doberer
- IRL ranking: 27th

Team results
- First international
- El Salvador 20 - 58 Chile (Henson Park, Australia; 11 June 2016)
- Biggest win
- Chile 54-8 Brazil (Los Ángeles, Chile; 17 November 2017)
- Biggest defeat
- United States 62-0 Chile (Jacksonville, Florida, United States; 13 November 2018)
- World Cup
- Appearances: 0

The Chile national rugby league team represents Chile in rugby league. The team is operated by Futbol a 13 Chile and sanctioned by the Rugby League International Federation to represent Chile at international level in the sport of rugby league.

== History ==
Rugby league (known locally as Futbol a 13) was introduced to Chile in 2015 when the Futbol a 13 Chile organization was formed. Working in partnership with Latin Heat Rugby League, an Australian-based expat team representing Chile competed in the Cabramatta International Nines, marking the first time a Chilean team participated in an organized rugby league competition.

The first domestic match in Chile was played in October 2016 in Negrete, which was followed by the announcement of the inaugural Chilean domestic competition. The competition was expanded with the Super Liga 13 Chile launching in 2017.

In November 2016, Chile competed in the inaugural international rugby league competition in South America, hosted in Miramar, Argentina, comprising Chile, Argentina and a number of select sides from around the region which were supported by the Latin Heat organization. The competition culminated in Argentina and Chile taking part in their first official international match, which Argentina won 16–0.

In November 2017, Los Ángeles, Chile, hosted the inaugural Latin American Rugby League Championship, comprising the national teams of Chile, Argentina, Colombia and Brazil. Chile won the inaugural tournament, defeating Argentina 32–12 in the final.

In November 2018 Chile participated in the 2018 Americas Rugby League Championship, which acted as the American qualifying competition for the 2021 Rugby League World Cup; as such they became the first South American nation to enter the competition. They were eliminated after losing 62–0 to the USA on 13 November 2018. Chile were also scheduled to take part in the 2020 Americas Championship, but the tournament was cancelled due to the COVID-19 pandemic.

== Honors ==
South American Rugby League Championship

- Champion (2): 2017, 2024
- Runners up (2): 2016, 2022

Latino Rugby League Sevens

- Champion (2): 2015, 2016
- Runners up (1): 2019

== IRL Rankings ==
IRL Men's World Rankings
Official rankings as of August 2026
Rank	Change	Team	Pts %
1	Steady	Australia	100
2	Steady	New Zealand	82
3	Steady	England	70
4	Steady	Samoa	56
5	Steady	Tonga	54
6	Steady	Papua New Guinea	47
7	Steady	Fiji	34
8	▲1	Cook Islands	24
9	▲2	Netherlands	23
10	▲2	Ukraine	21
11	▼3	France	21
12	▼2	Serbia	20
13	Steady	Wales	18
14	Steady	Ireland	17
15	Steady	Greece	14
16	Steady	Malta	14
17	▲12	Canada	13
18	▼1	Italy	11
19	▼1	Jamaica	9
20	▲7	Scotland	8
21	▲1	United States	8
22	▼3	Poland	7
23	▼3	Lebanon	7
24	▼1	Germany	7
25	▼1	Czech Republic	6
26	▼5	Norway	6
27	▼2	Chile	5
28	▲2	Philippines	5
29	▼1	South Africa	4
30	Steady	Brazil	3
31	Steady	Morocco	3
32	▲1	Argentina	3
33	▲2	Ghana	2
34	▲2	Kenya	2
35	▼1	Montenegro	2
36	▲1	Nigeria	2
37	▼5	North Macedonia	1
38	Steady	Albania	1
39	Steady	Turkey	1
40	Steady	Bulgaria	1
41	Steady	Cameroon	0
42	Steady	Japan	0
43	Steady	Spain	0
44	Steady	Colombia	0
45	Steady	Russia	0
46	Steady	El Salvador	0
47	Steady	Bosnia and Herzegovina	0
48	Steady	Hong Kong	0
49	Steady	Solomon Islands	0
50	Steady	Vanuatu	0
51	Steady	Hungary	0
52	Steady	Latvia	0
53	Steady	Denmark	0
54	Steady	Belgium	0
55	Steady	Estonia	0
56	Steady	Sweden	0
57	Steady	Niue	0
Complete rankings at www.internationalrugbyleague.com

== Competitive record ==
Chile national side's competitive record up to date as of 1 December 2024.

Opponent	Played	Won	Drawn	Lost
Argentina	2	1	0	1
Brazil	3	2	0	1
Canada	1	0	0	1
Colombia	1	1	0	0
El Salvador	1	1	0	0
North Macedonia	1	1	0	0
Malta	1	0	0	1
Philippines	1	1	0	0
Poland	1	0	0	1
Thailand	1	0	1	0
United States	1	0	0	1
Total	14	7	1	6
