= Colombia national rugby league team =

Colombia National Rugby Team

Colombia

Team information
- Governing body: -
- Region: -
- Head coach: Jorge Cantillo
- Captain: Sebastian Martinez
- Most caps: -
- Top try-scorer: -
- Top point-scorer: -
- IRL ranking: 44th

Uniforms
First colours

Team results
- First international
- Argentina 36-6 Colombia (Los Ángeles, Chile; 17 November 2017)
- Biggest win
- Colombia 22-18 Brazil (Los Ángeles, Chile; 18 November 2017)
- Biggest defeat
- Brazil 52-14 Colombia (São Paulo, Brazil; 23 November 2018); El Salvador 48-10 Colombia (Rochedale, Brisbane; 21 October 2018)
- World Cup
- Appearances: (first time in -)
- Best result: -

The Colombian national rugby league team represents Colombia in the sport of rugby league.

== History ==
The first rugby league team representing Colombia was organized by the Australian-based Latin Heat Rugby League organization in 2016, with a team of Colombian expats taking part in various competitions and small-sided matches against other teams representing Latin American nations. The first Colombian rugby league team, the Nativos, was established in the city of Antofagasta, Chile in 2017. Colombia made their international rugby league debut in the inaugural Latin American Rugby League Championships held in Los Ángeles, Chile in November 2017, losing 36-6 to Argentina in the first RLIF-sanctioned international on South American soil.

== Current squad ==
vs South American Championship

- Andres Jimenez
- Leonardo Delgado
- William Martinez
- Daniel Medina
- Jessua Guillot
- Andrew Zuluaga
- John Garcia
- Juan David Espinal
- Sebastian Martinez
- Fredy Diaz
- Rafael Lopez
- Hector Linares
- Carlos Mendoza
- Nelson Parada
- David Perez
- Jesus Delgado
- Jean Villamil
- Sebastian Rodger
- Ruben Zequeda

== IRL Rankings ==
IRL Men's World Rankings
Official rankings as of December 2025
Rank	Change	Team	Pts %
1	Steady	Australia	100
2	Steady	New Zealand	82
3	Steady	England	74
4	Steady	Samoa	56
5	Steady	Tonga	54
6	Steady	Papua New Guinea	47
7	Steady	Fiji	34
8	Steady	France	24
9	Steady	Cook Islands	24
10	Steady	Serbia	23
11	Steady	Netherlands	22
12	Steady	Ukraine	21
13	Steady	Wales	18
14	Steady	Ireland	17
15	Steady	Greece	15
16	Steady	Malta	15
17	Steady	Italy	11
18	Steady	Jamaica	9
19	▲1	Poland	7
20	▲1	Lebanon	7
21	▲1	Norway	7
22	▼3	United States	7
23	Steady	Germany	7
24	Steady	Czech Republic	6
25	Steady	Chile	6
26	▲1	Philippines	5
27	▲1	Scotland	5
28	▼2	South Africa	5
29	▲1	Canada	5
30	▼1	Brazil	3
31	▲1	Morocco	3
32	▲1	North Macedonia	3
33	▲1	Argentina	3
34	▲1	Montenegro	3
35	▲4	Ghana	2
36	▼5	Kenya	2
37	▲3	Nigeria	2
38	▼2	Albania	1
39	▼2	Turkey	1
40	▼2	Bulgaria	1
41	▲1	Cameroon	0
42	▲1	Japan	0
43	▲1	Spain	0
44	▼3	Colombia	0
45	Steady	Russia	0
46	Steady	El Salvador	0
47	Steady	Bosnia and Herzegovina	0
48	Steady	Hong Kong	0
49	Steady	Solomon Islands	0
50	Steady	Vanuatu	0
51	Steady	Hungary	0
52	Steady	Latvia	0
53	Steady	Denmark	0
54	Steady	Belgium	0
55	Steady	Estonia	0
56	Steady	Sweden	0
57	Steady	Niue	0
Complete rankings at www.internationalrugbyleague.com
