= International rugby league in 2018 =

A list of men and women international rugby league matches played throughout 2018 and does not include wheelchair rugby league international matches. A † denotes a recognised, but unofficial match that did not contribute to the IRL World Rankings.

== February ==
=== Hungary vs Philippines ===
3 February 2018
18:00 AEST (UTC+10)

Hungary	30 – 12	Philippines
Tries: Bruckner (2), Flanagan (2), Kovác; Goals: J. Farkas (5/6)	Report	Tries: Sheedy, Swanson; Goals: Zappia (2/2)

Betty Diamond Complex, Gold Coast
Attendance: ≈400
Referee: Michael Gordon (Australia)

Team details

FB	1	Nathan Farkas
WG	2	Josh Warner
CE	3	Josh Institoris
CE	4	Brent Varga
WG	5	Liam Hodge
FE	6	Aaron Farkas
HB	7	Lachlyn Mulford
PR	8	Joel Saaghy
HK	9	Stuart Flanagan (c)
PR	10	James Kovác
SR	11	Daniel Ivan
SR	12	Paul McKewin
LK	13	Jared Farkas (c)
Interchange:
BE	14	Stephen Kovacs
BE	15	Norbert Csapkai
BE	16	Jayden Bruckner
BE	17	Dennis Bate
Coach:
Jonathan Wilson

FB	1	Trent Swanson
WG	2	Jhun Cortez
CE	3	Rupert Zappia
CE	4	Ned Stephenson
WG	5	John Nicodemus
FE	6	Odyssey Laderas
HB	7	Paul Sheedy (c)
PR	8	Rez Phillips (c)
HK	9	James Marcus
PR	10	Ryan Jones
SR	11	Joseph Mallion
SR	12	Will Grooms
LK	13	Steven Bernstrom
Interchange:
BE	14	Kenny Kennedy
BE	15	Jeremy Grooms
BE	16	Elvis Jensen
BE	17	Ramon Stubbs
Coach:
Arwin Marcus

Man of the Match:
Stuart Flanagan (Hungary)

=== Malta vs Hungary ===
18 February 2018
14:00 AEDT (UTC+11)

Malta	40 – 28	Hungary
Tries: Muscat (2), Campbell, Falzon, Glanville, Phillips, Rodrigues, Scott; Goals: Glanville (4/5), Camilleri (0/1), Campbell (0/1), Rodrigues (0/1)	Report	Tries: Bruckner, A. Farkas, N. Farkas, M. Fukofuka, Kamire; Goals: A. Farkas (4/4), J. Farkas (0/1)

St Marys Stadium, Sydney
Referee: Brandon Cavallaro (Australia)

Team details

FB	1	Justin Rodrigues
WG	2	Nathan Benson
CE	3	Tyson Muscat
CE	4	Nathan Falzon
WG	5	Jake Scott
FE	6	Aiden Glanville
HB	7	Jono Dallas
PR	8	Kyal Greene
HK	9	Jake Attard (c)
PR	10	Jake Lennox
SR	11	Blake Phillips
SR	12	Aaron Grech
LK	13	Adam Campbell
Interchange:
BE	14	Brodie Vassallo
BE	15	Zac Camilleri
BE	16	Zach Borg
BE	17	Joshua Caruana
Coach:
Peter Cassar; Aaron McDonald

FB	1	Josh Warner
WG	2	Jayden Bruckner
CE	3	Brent Varga
CE	4	Matiu Fukofuka
WG	5	Andras Eglesz
FE	6	Aaron Farkas
HB	7	Ali Allouche
PR	8	Jake Kamire
HK	9	Nathan Farkas
PR	10	Joseph Toth
SR	11	Daniel Ivan
SR	12	Sione Fukofuka
LK	13	Jared Farkas (c)
Interchange:
BE	14	Matthew Stone
BE	16	Stephen Kovacs
BE	17	Tevita Loko
BE	21	Joel Saaghy
Coach:
Jonathan Wilson

Touch judges:
Mitchell Robinson (Australia)
Jack Gerrie (Australia)

== April ==
=== Burundi vs DR Congo ===
29 April 2018†
11:30 CAT (UTC+02)

Burundi	4 – 4	DR Congo
Tries: Timbiri; Goals: Yankundiye (0/6)	Report	Tries: Ruguma; Goals: Ramazi (0/4)

Kinanira III Bujumbura, Bujumbura
Attendance: ≈160
Referee: Jean Du Christ Rusiga (Burundi)

== June ==
=== Japan vs Hong Kong ===
16 June 2018
13:30 JST (UTC+09)

Japan	20 – 32	Hong Kong
Tries: Karino, Fujitaka, Mochizuki, Pavešić; Goals: Fujitaka (2/4)	Report	Tries: Toomalatai (3), Baleyte, McMurrich, Spence; Goals: Lindsay (3/4), Spence (1/2)

Inagi Central Park, Tokyo
Referee: Paul Wani (Papua New Guinea)

Team details

FB	1	Itaru Matsuo
WG	2	Junpei Maruno
CE	3	John Koji Akiba
CE	5	Dai Fujitaka
WG	4	Matthew Yuki Mochizuki
FE	6	Kenta Karino
HB	7	Kenshin Tsutsui
PR	14	Tomohiro Setoguchi
HK	9	Taou Sugano
PR	10	Hiroshi Fukasawa
SR	11	Nikola Pavešić
SR	12	Yuta Oba
LK	13	Lachlan Grieve (c)
Interchange:
BE	8	Gorka Gerediaga Etxaburu
BE	15	Yoshihisa Ogata
BE	17	Akihito Kashiwaba
BE	19	Tsunaki Tanaka
Coach:
Amane Konishi

FB	3	Tommy Wong
WG	2	Benoit Mouclier
CE	15	Hogan Toomalatai
CE	4	Ghislain Baleyte
WG	16	Alvin Chan
FE	20	Jason Fairleigh
HB	1	Gus Spence
PR	23	Ben Ryan
HK	7	Ringo Lung (c)
PR	22	Jack Nielsen
SR	10	Richard Lindsay
SR	12	Jason Yip
LK	6	Alex Shvets
Interchange:
BE	11	Udo Wong
BE	13	Craig McMurrich
BE	14	Allan Newsome
BE	18	Toby Lei
Coach:
Jason Fairleigh

Man of the Match:
Hogan Toomalatai (Hong Kong)

Touch judges:
Garth Mitchell (New Zealand)
Geoff Yorston (Japan)

Notes:

- Paul Wani became the first Papua New Guinean to referee an international match since Graham Ainui in 1991.

=== Euro C ===
16 June 2018
17:00 CEST (UTC+02:00)

Czech Republic	20–12	Norway
Tries: Chrbolka, Heininger, Kittl; Goals: Koliska (4/5)	Report	Tries: Cummins, McIntyre; Goals: Cummins (2/2)

Vrchlabí Football Stadium, Vrchlabí
Attendance: 1,000
Referee: Radoslav Novaković (Serbia)
Player of the Match: Patrik Koliska (Czech Republic)

Team details

FB	1	Patrik Koliska
WG	2	Oldřich Chrbolka
CE	3	Filip Špaček
CE	4	Filip-Daniel Kittl
WG	5	Jan Murdoch
FE	6	Ladislav Cintler
HB	7	Tomáš Řičica (c)
PR	8	Tomáš Adamec
HK	9	Petr Šedina
PR	10	Pavel Mejstřík
SR	11	Jan Heininger
SR	12	Richard Gach
LK	13	Ondřej Preininger
Interchange:
BE	14	Dominik Machek
BE	15	Lukáš Kristof
BE	16	Adam Petržela
BE	18	Aleš Pour
Coach:
Ladislav Cintler

FB	1	Frank Kiriinya
WG	2	Bendik Kalvik
CE	3	Kristoffer Borsheim
CE	4	Fredrik Nordtun
WG	5	Ole Magnus Brekk
FE	6	Simon Viljoen
HB	7	Nathan Cummins
PR	8	Ezra McIntyre
HK	9	Kristoffer Milligan (c)
PR	10	Mathias Vada Stenseth-Holm
SR	11	Kristian Nordin-Skipnes
SR	12	Kevin Båtnes
LK	13	Isaac Schmidt
Interchange:
BE	14	Kim André Seglem
BE	15	Ravn Arvidsønn
BE	16	Christoffer Stalsberg
BE	17	Sonny Mellor
Coach:
Dave Hunter

=== Melanesian Cup ===
23 June 2018
16:00 AEST (UTC+10)

Papua New Guinea	26 – 14	Fiji
Tries: Rau (2), Olam, Page; Goals: Martin (5/5)	Report	Tries: Montoya, Phillips, Vunivalu; Goals: Moceidreke (1/2), Raiwalui (0/1)

Campbelltown Stadium, Sydney
Attendance: 17,802
Referee: Matt Cecchin (Australia)

Team details

FB	1	Justin Olam
WG	2	Junior Rau
CE	3	Thompson Teteh
CE	4	Willie Minoga
WG	5	Richard Pandia
FE	6	Lachlan Lam
HB	7	Watson Boas
PR	8	Stanton Albert
HK	9	James Segeyaro (c)
PR	10	Luke Page
SR	11	Rhyse Martin
SR	12	Nixon Putt
LK	13	Rod Griffin
Interchange:
BE	14	Kurt Baptiste
BE	15	Rhadley Brawa
BE	16	Ase Boas
BE	17	Enock Maki
Coach:
Michael Marum

FB	1	Kevin Naiqama (c)
WG	2	Suliasi Vunivalu
CE	3	Akuila Uate
CE	4	Tyrone Phillips
WG	5	Marcelo Montoya
FE	6	Henry Raiwalui
HB	7	Jarryd Hayne
PR	8	Kane Evans
HK	9	Joe Lovodua
PR	13	Eloni Vunakece
SR	11	King Vuniyayawa
SR	12	Salesi Junior Fainga'a
LK	10	Tui Kamikamica
Interchange:
BE	14	Pio Seci
BE	15	Sitiveni Moceidreke
BE	16	Pio Sokobalavu
BE	17	Junior Roqica
Coach:
Matt Adamson

Man of the Match:
James Segeyaro (Papua New Guinea)

Touch judges:
Kasey Badger (Australia)
Michael Wise (Australia)
Video referees:
Henry Perenara (New Zealand)
Bryan Norrie (Australia)

Notes:

- Rhadley Brawa, Junior Rau (both Papua New Guinea), King Vuniyayawa, and Pio Sokobalavu (both Fiji) made their Test debuts.

=== Polynesian Cup ===
23 June 2018
19:10 AEST (UTC+10)

Tonga	38 – 22	Samoa
Tries: Havili, Hingano, Hopoate, Hurrell, R. Jennings, Tatola, Tupou; Goals: Taukeiaho (5/8)	Report	Tries: Gavet, Lafai, May, Taufua; Goals: Lino (3/4)

Campbelltown Stadium, Sydney
Attendance: 17,802
Referee: Grant Atkins (Australia)

Team details

FB	1	William Hopoate (c)
WG	2	Daniel Tupou
CE	3	Konrad Hurrell
CE	4	Michael Jennings
WG	5	Robert Jennings
FE	6	Tuimoala Lolohea
HB	7	Ata Hingano
PR	8	Andrew Fifita
HK	9	Siliva Havili
PR	10	Addin Fonua-Blake
SR	11	Manu Ma'u
SR	12	Sio Siua Taukeiaho
LK	13	Jason Taumalolo (c)
Interchange:
BE	14	Sione Katoa
BE	15	Joe Ofahengaue
BE	16	Peni Terepo
BE	17	Tevita Tatola
Coach:
Kristian Woolf

FB	1	Anthony Milford (c)
WG	2	Christian Crichton
CE	3	Joseph Leilua (c)
CE	4	Tim Lafai
WG	5	Jorge Taufua
FE	6	Tyrone May
HB	7	Mason Lino
PR	8	James Gavet
HK	17	Joseph Paulo
PR	10	Sam Kasiano
SR	11	Michael Chee-Kam
SR	12	Isaiah Papali'i
LK	13	Bunty Afoa
Interchange:
BE	9	Pita Godinet
BE	14	Dunamis Lui
BE	15	Josh Aloiai
BE	16	Ligi Sao
Coach:
Matt Parish

Touch judges:
Chris Butler (Australia)
Chris Sutton (Australia)
Video referees:
Luke Patten (Australia)
Ben Cummins (Australia)

Notes:

- Robert Jennings, Tevita Tatola (both Tonga), Josh Aloiai, Michael Chee-Kam, Christian Crichton, Tyrone May, Isaiah Papali'i, and Ligi Sao (all Samoa) made their Test debuts, while Jorge Taufua made his debut for Samoa having previously represented Tonga.

=== England vs New Zealand in United States ===
23 June 2018
14:10 MDT (UTC−06)

England	36 – 18	New Zealand
Tries: Whitehead (2), Bateman, Connor, Hall, Makinson; Goals: Widdop (6/7), Graham (0/1)	Report	Tries: Watene-Zelezniak (2), Marsters; Goals: Isaako (3/3)

Mile High Stadium, Denver
Attendance: 19,320
Referee: Ben Thaler (England)

Team details

FB	1	Stefan Ratchford
WG	2	Jermaine McGillvary
CE	3	John Bateman
CE	4	Mark Percival
WG	5	Ryan Hall
FE	6	Jonny Lomax
HB	7	Gareth Widdop
PR	8	Chris Hill
HK	9	James Roby
PR	10	James Graham
SR	11	Sam Burgess
SR	12	Elliott Whitehead
LK	13	Sean O'Loughlin (c)
Interchange:
BE	14	Jake Connor
BE	15	Tom Burgess
BE	16	Thomas Makinson
BE	17	Scott Taylor
Coach:
Wayne Bennett

FB	1	Dallin Watene-Zelezniak
WG	2	Jamayne Isaako
CE	3	Esan Marsters
CE	4	Peta Hiku
WG	5	Ken Maumalo
FE	6	Te Maire Martin
HB	7	Kodi Nikorima
PR	8	Jared Waerea-Hargreaves
HK	9	Issac Luke
PR	10	Nelson Asofa-Solomona
SR	15	Raymond Faitala-Mariner
SR	12	Joseph Tapine
LK	13	Martin Taupau
Interchange:
BE	11	James Fisher-Harris
BE	14	Slade Griffin
BE	16	Herman Ese'ese
BE	17	Leeson Ah Mau
Coach:
Michael Maguire

Man of the Match:
Elliott Whitehead (England)

Touch judges:
Chris Kendall (England)
Chris McMillan (New Zealand)
Video referee:
Jared Maxwell (Australia)

Notes:

- Newly appointed New Zealand coach Michael Maguire opted not to name a captain for this Test match. Issac Luke took de facto control of the role.
- Jake Connor, Thomas Makinson (both England), Slade Griffin, and Jamayne Isaako (both New Zealand) made their Test debuts, while Leeson Ah Mau, Herman Ese'ese, Raymond Faitala-Mariner, Esan Marsters, Ken Maumalo made their debuts for New Zealand having previously represented another nation (Samoa in all cases, except Cook Islands for Marsters).
- This match set the highest attendance for a standalone rugby league match played in the United States, eclipsing the 12,349 that attended the 1987 State of Origin exhibition match at Veterans Memorial Stadium in Long Beach and the ≈12,000-12,500 that attended the 2008 pre-season trial between the South Sydney Rabbitohs and the Leeds Rhinos at Hodges Stadium in Jacksonville. An international between the United States and Canada at Baltimore Memorial Stadium in 1995, which acted as a curtain raiser for a CFL match between the Baltimore Stallions and Toronto Argonauts, posted a crowd of 27,853.

=== South Africa vs Malta ===
24 June 2018
15:00 AEST (UTC+10)

South Africa	30 – 24	Malta
Tries: Benadie, Hutchinson, King, O'Donovan, Smith Jr; Goals: Louw (4/4), Benadie (1/1)	Report	Tries: Dallas (2), Borg, Mazzelli; Goals: Benson (4/4)

St Marys Stadium, Sydney
Attendance: 813
Referee: Damian Brady (Australia)

Team details

FB	1	Tyler Thomas
WG	2	Darren O'Donovan
CE	3	Byron Hutchinson
CE	4	Will Smith Jr
WG	5	Juan Benadie
FE	6	Bevan De Vries (c)
HB	7	Jason King
PR	8	Joel Tubbs
HK	9	Marcelle Viljoen (c)
PR	10	Ashley Bull
SR	11	Wicus Boshoff
SR	12	Seth Buckley
LK	13	Jean-Charl Smith
Interchange:
BE	14	Johan Louw
BE	15	Halvor Harris
BE	16	Chelsea Michael Adams
BE	17	Devyn Smith
Coach:
Jon Wilson

FB	1	Nathan Benson
WG	2	Joshua Cregan
CE	23	Joshua Martin
CE	4	Cameron Mazzelli
WG	5	Jake Scott
FE	6	Dylan Wilson
HB	7	Jono Dallas
PR	8	Kyal Greene
HK	9	Adam Campbell
PR	10	Dean Zammit (c)
SR	11	Jake Lennox
SR	12	Tyler Cassel
LK	13	Jesse Cronin
Interchange:
BE	3	Tyson Muscat
BE	15	Zach Borg
BE	16	Matthew Mizzi
BE	17	Peter Cronin
Co-coaches:
Peter Cassar; Aaron McDonald

Touch judges:
Tom Cambourne (Australia)
Lyndsay Packer (Australia)

=== Euro C ===
30 June 2018
18:00 CEST (UTC+02:00)

Malta	22–34	Ukraine
Tries: Falzon (2), J. Attard, Maylor; Goals: M. Attard (2/3), Chircop (1/1)	Report	Tries: Semerenko (2), Andreychenko, Scherbina, Skorbach, Troyan; Goals: Mazepa (5/6)

Marsa Sports Complex, Marsa
Attendance: 500
Referee: Radoslav Novaković (Serbia)
Touch judges: Roman Bykhov (Ukraine), Adrian Seglem (Norway)

Team details

FB	1	Nathan Falzon
WG	2	Jean Pierre Zarb
CE	3	Jon Jon Micallef
CE	4	Matt Camilleri (c)
WG	5	Shaun Chircop
FE	6	Malcolm Attard
HB	7	Aaron Grech
PR	8	Vince Farrugia
HK	9	Jake Attard
PR	26	Jeremy Dela
SR	11	Ian Catania
SR	12	Nicky Maylor
LK	13	Tyson Freeman
Interchange:
BE	14	Jamie Brincat Brockdorff
BE	15	Joseph Pio Mizzi
BE	17	Clive Sciberras
BE	25	Ben Naudi
Coaches:
Sam Blyton-Keep

FB	1	Bogdan Veprik
WG	2	Mikhail Troyan
CE	3	Mikhailo Pavliv
CE	4	Svyatoslav Andreychenko
WG	5	Anatoly Grankovskii
FE	6	Aleksandr Skorbach (c)
HB	7	Vladimir Mazepa
PR	8	Volodymyr Radchik
HK	9	Dmitriy Semrenko
PR	10	Nazar Semion
SR	14	Evgenii Trusov
SR	12	Aleksandr Sivokoz
LK	13	Aleksandr Scherbina
Interchange:
BE	11	Vladimir Karpenko
BE	15	Igor Yurkin
BE	16	Ostap Grischenko
BE	22	Sergii Kravchenko
Coach:
Gennady Veprik

=== Hungary vs Ireland ===
30 June 2018
18:00 CEST (UTC+02)

Hungary	0 – 70	Ireland
	Report	Tries: A. Coade (3), Phillips (2), Boyd, M. Coade, Dunne, Hall, Loughrey, McHugh, McMahon; Goals: M. Coade (9/10), Dunne (2/2)

National University of Public Service, Budapest
Referee: Eamonn Whelan (Ireland)

Team details

FB	1	Luke Brough
WG	15	Istvan Krupp
CE	16	Geza Goletz
CE	18	Mark Czifra
WG	5	Stephen Nemeth
FE	6	Temuujin Uranchimeg
HB	7	Lachlyn Mulford (c)
PR	8	Jozsef Surman
HK	9	Dane Weatherill
PR	10	Joel Saaghy
SR	11	Simon Kalafusz
SR	12	Gyula Nikoletti
LK	13	Stephen Kovacs
Interchange:
BE	2	Dani Liptak
BE	3	Dominik Filip
BE	14	Lenard Grimm
BE	17	Zsolt Lukacs
Coach:
Jonathan Wilson

FB	1	Casey Dunne (c)
WG	2	John Rhatigan
CE	3	Alan McMahon
CE	4	Andrew Coade
WG	5	Conor Loughrey
FE	6	Matthew Coade
HB	7	Phil Morrison
PR	8	Gareth Gill
HK	9	Conor Phillips
PR	10	Chris Hall
SR	11	Roy Stanley
SR	12	Collie Ryan
LK	13	Wayne Kelly
Interchange:
BE	14	Ryan Guilfoyle
BE	15	Richie McHugh
BE	16	Darragh Magee
BE	17	Sam Boyd
Coach:
Carl De Chenu

== July ==
=== Czech Republic vs Hungary ===
14 July 2018
17:00 CEST (UTC+02)

Czech Republic	64 – 10	Hungary
Tries: Chrbolka (4), Heininger (3), Berk, Bžoch, Mejstřík, Pavelek, Řičica; Goals: Koliska (7/11), Řičica (1/1)	Report	Tries: Surman (2); Goals: Uranchimeg (1/2)

Chrudim Sports Complex, Pardubice
Referee: Bartek Sierota (Poland)

Team details

FB	1	Patrik Koliska
WG	2	Oldřich Chrbolka
CE	3	Antonín Berk Jnr
CE	4	Jaroslav Bžoch
WG	5	Filip Špaček
FE	6	Tomáš Řičica (c)
HB	7	Jakub Hudrlík
PR	8	Tomáš Adamec
HK	9	Ladislav Cintler
PR	10	Pavel Mejstřík
SR	11	Lukáš Krištof
SR	12	Jan Heininger
LK	13	Ondřej Preininger
Interchange:
BE	15	Kamil Havel
BE	16	Roman Pavelek
BE	17	Pavel Mikeska
BE	20	Jan Zámrský
Coach:
Ladislav Cintler

FB	1	Temuujin Uranchimeg
WG	2	Dominik Filip
CE	3	Botond Kovacs
CE	4	Istvan Krupp
WG	5	Dani Liptak
FE	17	Joel Saaghy
HB	7	Lachlyn Molford
PR	8	Jozsef Surman
HK	9	Jayden Bruckner
PR	10	Geza Goletz
SR	11	Stephen Kovacs
SR	12	Gyula Nikoletti
LK	13	Mark Czifra
Interchange:
BE	14	Gyula Herpai
BE	15	Bálint Mézes
BE	16	Stephen Nemeth
BE	18	Zsolt Lukacs (c)
Coach:
Jonathan Wilson

Notes:

- Bartek Sierota became the first Pole to referee an international match.

== August ==
=== Euro C ===
25 August 2018
16:00 CEST (UTC+02:00)

Germany	24–4	Czech Republic
Tries: Wood (2), Billsborough, Dent; Goals: Billsborough (4/5)	Report	Tries: Chrbolka; Goals: Řičica (0/1)

Ballsport e.V., Osnabrück
Attendance: 250
Referee: Andrew Pilkington (Spain)
Touch judges: Max Doughton (Germany), Nikos Hatzinikos (Greece)
Player of the Match: Brad Billsborough (Germany)

Team details

FB	1	Ben Dent
WG	2	Jannek Hagenah
CE	3	George Wood
CE	4	Sebastian Peter
WG	5	David Ziekursch
FE	6	Brad Billsborough (c)
HB	7	Marc Zupan
PR	18	Connor Hampson
HK	9	Liam Doughton
PR	10	Sebastian Roczyn
SR	11	Martin Apostel
SR	12	Joshua Leutenecker
LK	13	Philip Hunz
Interchange:
BE	14	Vivi Seelweger
BE	15	Phil Wadewitz
BE	16	Renko Flemming
BE	19	Karsten Brüning
Co-coaches:
Bob Doughton; Simon Cooper

FB	1	Jan Mudroch
WG	2	Oldřich Chrbolka
CE	3	Antonín Berk
CE	4	Filip-Daniel Kittl
WG	5	Filip Špaček
FE	6	Tomáš Řičica (c)
HB	7	Jakub Hudrlík
PR	8	Bruno Jasiczek
HK	9	Petr Šedina
PR	10	Ondřej Maňák
SR	11	Ondřej Preininger
SR	12	Jan Heininger
LK	13	Josef Maňák
Interchange:
BE	14	Tomáš Adamec
BE	15	Richard Gach
BE	16	Lukáš Krištof
BE	18	Aleš Pour
Coach:
Ladislav Cintler

== September ==
=== Norway vs Poland ===
1 September 2018
14:00 CEST (UTC+02)

Norway	76 – 0	Poland
Tries: Holte (2), Kalvik (2), McIntyre (2), Viljoen (2), Båtnes, Borsheim, Havard Strand, Mikalsen, Stalsberg, Zuniga; Goals: Borsheim (6/6), Nordtun (4/6)	Report

Stavanger Stadion, Stavanger
Attendance: ≈300
Referee: Jaroslav Bžoch (Czech Republic)

=== Griffin Cup ===
1 September 2018
15:00 CEST (UTC+02)

Netherlands	38 – 22	Germany
Tries: Schoenmaker (2), Bos, de Ruiter, Geurtjens, Razoux Schultz, van Wijk; Goals: Gout (5/8)	Report	Tries: Akbayrak, Seelweger, Tokona, Verstratten; Goals: Seelweger (3/4)

Sparta Rugby, Rotterdam
Referee: Joseph Jhugroo (Netherlands)

=== Euro C ===
8 September 2018
17:00 EEST (UTC+03:00)

Ukraine	26–28	Greece
Tries: Andreychenko, Shalaev, Sivokoz, Skorbach, Veprik; Goals: Skorbach (3/5)	Report	Tries: Meads (2), N. Bosmos, Constantinou, Kartsonakis; Goals: Meads (4/6)

Dynamo Stadium, Kharkiv
Attendance: 700
Referee: Matthew Rossleigh (England)
Touch judges: Aleksey Markov (Ukraine), Aleksey Shkolny (Ukraine)

Team details

FB	1	Bogdan Veprik
WG	2	Svyatoslav Andreychenko
CE	3	Mikhail Troyan
CE	4	Nikolai Shalaev
WG	5	Anatoly Grankovskii
FE	6	Aleksandr Skorbach (c)
HB	7	Mikhailo Pavliv
PR	8	Volodymyr Radchik
HK	9	Dmitriy Semerenko
PR	10	Aleksandr Kozak
SR	11	Andriy Shakura
SR	12	Evgenii Trusov
LK	13	Aleksandr Scherbina
Interchange:
BE	15	Ostap Grischenko
BE	16	Aleksandr Sivokoz
BE	17	Dmitrii Kaevich
BE	23	Igor Yurkin
Coach:
Gennady Veprik

FB	1	Dimosthenis Kartsonakis
WG	2	Nikolaos Kourkakis
CE	3	Alvaro Zota
CE	4	Konstantinos Katsidonis
WG	5	Michail Bosmos
FE	6	Nikolaos Bosmos
HB	20	Jordan Meads (c)
PR	8	Stefanos Bastas
HK	9	Ioannis Nake
PR	15	Ioannis Rousoglou
SR	11	Sebastian Sell
SR	12	Robert Tuliatu
LK	13	Terry Constantinou
Interchange:
BE	7	Konstantinos Koutras
BE	14	Komninos Tsavaris
BE	16	Eugenios Malai
BE	17	Panteleimon Tsattalios
Coach:
Michalis Chatziioannou

=== Euro C ===
15 September 2018
15:00 CEST (UTC+02:00)

Norway	40–22	Germany
Tries: Borsheim (4), Cummins, Kalvik, Milligan, Viljoen; Goals: Cummins (2/6), Nordtun (2/2)	Report	Tries: Billsborough, Hampson, Hoggins, Hunz; Goals: Billsborough (3/4)

Kjølnes Idrettspark, Porsgrunn
Attendance: 562
Referee: James Spencer (Ireland)

=== Euro C ===
15 September 2018
16:00 EEST (UTC+03:00)

Greece	60–4	Malta
Tries: Constantinou (2), Katsidonis (2), Meads (2), Tsattalios (2), Malai, Tuliatu, Zampetides; Goals: Meads (6/9), N. Bosmos (2/2)	Report	Tries: Caruana; Goals: Chircop (0/1)

Glyka Nera Stadium, Athens
Attendance: 200
Referee: Benjamin Casty (France)
Touch judges: Aris Dardamanis (Greece), Dimitris Kogianos (Greece)

Team details

FB	1	Dimosthenis Kartsonakis
WG	2	Nikolaos Kourkakis
CE	3	Alvaro Zota
CE	4	Konstantinos Katsidonis
WG	5	Ioannis Nake
FE	17	Pantelis Tsattalios
HB	20	Jordan Meads (c)
PR	8	Stefanos Bastas
HK	9	Nikolaos Bosmos
PR	15	Ioannis Rousoglou
SR	11	Mitchell Zampetides
SR	12	Robert Tuliatu
LK	13	Terry Constantinou
Interchange:
BE	6	Michail Bosmos
BE	7	Konstantinos Koutras
BE	14	Komninos Tsavaris
BE	16	Eugenios Malai
Coach:
Michalis Chatziiannou

FB	1	Jake Scott
WG	6	Jean Pierre Zarb
CE	3	Pete Debono
CE	4	Jon Jon Micallef
WG	5	Shaun Chircop
FE	2	Liam Davis
HB	7	Adam Campbell
PR	8	Dean Zammit
HK	9	Josh Caruana
PR	10	Vince Farrugia
SR	17	Damien Davis
SR	12	Nicky Maylor
LK	13	Joseph Pio Mizzi (c)
Interchange:
BE	11	Clive Sciberras
BE	14	Sam Blyton-Keep
BE	16	Liam Scicluna
Coach:
Sam Blyton-Keep

=== Sweden vs Netherlands ===
22 September 2018
14:00 CEST (UTC+02)

Sweden	4 – 24	Netherlands
Tries: Lyppert; Goals: Andreasson (0/1)	Report	Tries: Bos (2), Schoenmaker, Wilce; Goals: Gout (4/4)

Gothenburg Rugby Club, Gothenburg
Referee: Guido Bonatti (Italy)

=== Hungary vs Poland ===
28 September 2018
19:15 AEST (UTC+10)

Hungary	0 – 32	Poland
	Report	Tries: S. Maslanka (3), Kowalski, M. Maslanka, Wertsak; Goals: Wertsak (3/5), Mykietyn (1/1)

Norford Park, Sydney
Referee: Robert McDonald (Australia)

Team details

FB	1	Gergely Nagy (c)
WG	2	Paul Mozar
CE	3	Cruize Turay
CE	4	Josh Warner
WG	5	Istvan Krupp
FE	6	Andras Eglesz
HB	7	Benjamin Bronzon
PR	8	Joel Saaghy
HK	9	Dane Weatherill (c)
PR	10	Mark Czifra
SR	11	Simon Kalafusz
SR	12	Jayson Gerecs
LK	13	Lenard Grimm
Interchange:
BE	14	Stephen Kovacs
BE	15	Gyula Nikoletti
BE	16	Shane Stevens
BE	17	Zsolt Lukacs
Coach:
Jonathan Wilson

FB	1	Robert Mykietyn
WG	2	Michal Maslanka
CE	3	Simon Maslanka
CE	4	Jamie Szczerbanik
WG	5	Jacob Williams
FE	6	Alex Kowalski (c)
HB	7	Nathan Michalowski
PR	8	Mikey Bryan
HK	9	Arek Wertsak
PR	10	Mark Churmycz
SR	11	Norbert Balacinski
SR	12	Jordan Owen
LK	13	Todd Moseley
Interchange:
BE	14	Lochlan Srama
BE	15	Tynan Forster
BE	16	Brayden Tyburski
BE	17	James Usher
Coach:
Lee Addison

== October ==
=== Emerging Nations ===
2018 Emerging Nations – Pool A

1 October 2018
13:30 AEST (UTC+10)

Malta	36 – 10	Philippines
Tries: K. Cassel (3), Attard, Benson, Rodrigues, S. Stone; Goals: Benson (4/7)	Report	Tries: Bien, Mackey; Goals: Bien (1/1), Wiggins (0/1)

Windsor Sporting Complex, Sydney
Attendance: ≈750
Referee: Blake Williams (Australia)

2018 Emerging Nations – Pool C

1 October 2018
15:15 AEST (UTC+10)

Turkey	30 – 22	Solomon Islands
Tries: Dalcik (2), A. Salman-Cochrane (2), Er, Bökeyhan Sürer; Goals: Bökeyhan Sürer (3/4), H. Karabork (0/2)	Report	Tries: Maebata (2), Kaipua, Tengemoana; Goals: Sanga (2/3), Moe'ava (1/1)

Windsor Sporting Complex, Sydney
Attendance: ≈750
Referee: Cameron Turner (Australia)

2018 Emerging Nations – Pool B

1 October 2018
17:00 AEST (UTC+10)

Hungary	20 – 18	Greece
Tries: D. Ivan, Kovac, Turay, Varga; Goals: J. Farkas (2/4)	Report	Tries: Mamouzelos, Stratis, A. Vrahnos; Goals: Stratis (3/3)

Windsor Sporting Complex, Sydney
Attendance: ≈750
Referee: Dillan Wells (Australia)

2018 Emerging Nations – Pool A

4 October 2018
11:55 AEST (UTC+10)

Malta	16 – 26	Niue
Tries: Campbell, T. Cassel, Muscat; Goals: Benson (2/3)	Report	Tries: Utatao (2), G. Lolo, Schaumkel, Tamasi; Goals: Paea (3/4), Samoa (0/1)

St Marys Stadium, Sydney
Attendance: ≈500
Referee: Mitchell Robinson (Australia)

2018 Emerging Nations – Pool C

4 October 2018
13:40 AEST (UTC+10)

Japan	0 – 60	Turkey
	Report	Tries: Bökeyhan Sürer (3), Turgut (2), Erten, Dagdanasar, A. Karabork, Baskonyali, Celikutan; Goals: Bökeyhan Sürer (7/9), Dagdanasar (1/1), J. Salman-Cochrane (0/1)

St Marys Stadium, Sydney
Attendance: ≈500
Referee: Robert Morey (Australia)

2018 Emerging Nations – Pool C

4 October 2018
15:20 AEST (UTC+10)

Hong Kong	6 – 62	Poland
Tries: McMurrich; Goals: Lindsay (1/1)	Report	Tries: Korostchuk (3), S. Maslanka (2), M. Maslanka (2), Metuangaro (2), Mykietyn (2), Niszczot; Goals: Niszczot (7)

St Marys Stadium, Sydney
Attendance: ≈500
Referee: Blake Williams (Australia)

2018 Emerging Nations – Pool B

4 October 2018
17:00 AEST (UTC+10)

Hungary	18 – 13	Vanuatu
Tries: N. Farkas, Gerecs; Goals: J. Farkas	Report	Tries: James Wood, Amani Arutahiki; Goals: Andrew Kaltongga (2); Drop goals: Mara

St Marys Stadium, Sydney
Attendance: ≈120
Referee: Ethan Murray (Australia)

2018 Emerging Nations – Pool A

7 October 2018
12:20 AEDT (UTC+11)

Philippines	12 – 24	Niue
Tries: Sheedy, Jensen; Goals: Bien (2)	Report	Tries: Utatao (2), Schaumkel, Payne, G. Lolo; Goals: Samoa (2)

Kellyville Ridge Reserve, Sydney
Attendance: ≈350
Referee: Cameron Turner (Australia)

2018 Emerging Nations – Pool C

7 October 2018
14:00 AEDT (UTC+11)

Solomon Islands	32 – 12	Hong Kong
Tries: Singamoana (2), Angikimua, Momoa, Sanga, Sa'omatangi, L. Tongaka; Goals: Moe'ava (2/5), Sanga (0/2)	Report	Tries: Griffiths, Waugh; Goals: Lindsay (2/2)

Kellyville Ridge Reserve, Sydney
Attendance: ≈250
Referee: Dillan Wells (Australia)

2018 Emerging Nations – Pool C

7 October 2018
17:10 AEDT (UTC+11)

Japan	6 – 58	Poland
Tries: F. Karino; Goals: F. Karino	Report	Tries: M. Maslanka (2), Niszczot (2), Artsivourtis, Bryan, Mikalowski, Niedzwiecki, Szczerbanik, Usher; Goals: Niszczot (9)

Kellyville Ridge Reserve, Sydney
Attendance: ≈220
Referee: Joseph Green (Australia)

2018 Emerging Nations – Pool B

7 October 2018
18:45 AEDT (UTC+11)

Greece	38 – 0	Vanuatu
Tries: A. Vrahnos, G. Tsikrikas, Zampetides, Mamouzelos, L. Zarounas, C. Hughes, Constantinou; Goals: Stratis (5)	Report

Kellyville Ridge Reserve, Sydney
Attendance: ≈125
Referee: Joey Butler (Australia)

2018 Emerging Nations – Plate Play-Off

9 October 2018
18:30 AEST (UTC+10)

Solomon Islands	44 – 22	Japan
Tries: Maebata (2), Moe'ava (2), Sanga, Taupongi, Tengemoana, L. Tongaka; Goals: Sanga (5/7), Moe'ava (1/1)		Tries: Shibasaki (2), Fujitaka, Grieve; Goals: F. Karino (3/4)

Windsor Sporting Complex, Sydney
Attendance: 45
Referee: Joseph Green (Australia)

2018 Emerging Nations – Trophy Semi-Final

10 October 2018
15:30 AEST (UTC+10)

Philippines	29 – 16	Turkey
Tries: Goodwin, Gordon, Sheedy, Stephenson, Stubbs; Goals: Wiggins (4); Drop goals: Sheedy	Report	Tries: Dalcik (2), A. Salman-Cochrane; Goals: Bokeyhan Surer (2)

New Era Stadium, Sydney
Attendance: ≈450
Referee: Ethan Murray (Australia)

2018 Emerging Nations – Trophy Semi-Final

10 October 2018
17:15 AEST (UTC+10)

Vanuatu	4 – 44	Poland
Tries: Arutahiki	Report	Tries: Korostchuk (2), Metuangaro (2), A. Kowalski, Niszczot, H. Siejka, Wertsak; Goals: Niszczot (3), H. Siejka (2), Metuangaro (1)

New Era Stadium, Sydney
Attendance: ≈150
Referee: Cody Simmons (Australia)

2018 Emerging Nations – Cup Semi-Final

10 October 2018
12:00 AEST (UTC+10)

Niue	16 – 8	Greece
Tries: W. Lolo, Payne, Utatao; Goals: Paea (2/3)	Report	Tries: J. Vrahnos; Goals: Stratis (2/2)

New Era Stadium, Sydney
Attendance: ≈450
Referee: Dillan Wells (Australia)

2018 Emerging Nations – Cup Semi-Final

10 October 2018
13:45 AEST (UTC+10)

Hungary	10 – 20	Malta
Tries: P. Ivan, Varga; Goals: D. Farkas (1)	Report	Tries: Campbell, T. Cassel, Cregan, Greene; Goals: Benson (2)

New Era Stadium, Sydney
Attendance: ≈300
Referee: Blake Williams (Australia)

2018 Emerging Nations – Plate Play-Off

11 October 2018
16:30 AEST (UTC+10)

Hong Kong	30 – 32	Japan
Tries: Griffiths, Lindsay, McMurrich, Ryan, Spence; Goals: Lindsay (5/5)		Tries: Shibasaki (2), Fujitaka, Fukushige, Gerediaga Etxaburu, Matsuo; Goals: Sugano (4/4), F. Karino (0/3)

Windsor Sporting Complex, Sydney
Attendance: 22
Referee: Ethan Murray (Australia)

2018 Emerging Nations – 7th Place Final

13 October 2018
12:15 AEST (UTC+10)

Turkey	27 – 26	Vanuatu
Tries: Baskonyali (2), Bokeyhan Surer, Dalcik, P. Salman-Cochrane; Goals: Bokeyhan Surer (3); Drop goals: Baskonyali	Report	Tries: Arutahiki (2), Philip (2), Kaltonga, Napakaurana; Goals: Kaltonga (1)

St Marys Stadium (field 2), Sydney
Attendance: ≈250
Referee: Mitchell Robinson (Australia)

2018 Emerging Nations – 3rd Place Final

13 October 2018
13:55 AEST (UTC+10)

Greece	26 – 18	Hungary
Tries: Mamouzelos (2), G. Tsikrikas (2), Stratis; Goals: Stratis (3)	Report	Tries: Acsai, P. Ivan, McKewin; Goals: J. Farkas (3)

St Marys Stadium (field 2), Sydney
Attendance: ≈350
Referee: Ethan Murray (Australia)

2018 Emerging Nations – Trophy Final

13 October 2018
14:00 AEST (UTC+10)

Philippines	10 – 14	Poland
Tries: Goodwin, Kucia; Goals: Bien (1)	Report	Tries: Korostchuk, Niszczot, H. Siejka; Goals: Niszczot (1)

St Marys Stadium, Sydney
Attendance: ≈500
Referee: Blake Williams (Australia)

2018 Emerging Nations – Plate Play-Off

13 October 2018
15:40 AEST (UTC+10)

Solomon Islands	56 – 14	Hong Kong
Tries: Angikimua (3), Manau (2), Moe'ava (2), Sa'omatangi, Sanga, Singamoana, Tengemoana; Goals: Moe'ava (5/9), Sanga (1/2)	Report	Tries: Barnes, Lindsay, McMurrich; Goals: Barnes (1/1), Lee (0/1), Lindsay (0/1)

St Marys Stadium (field 2), Sydney
Attendance: ≈100
Referee: Robert Morey (Australia)

2018 Emerging Nations – Cup Final

13 October 2018
15:55 AEST (UTC+10)

Niue	16 – 24	Malta
Tries: G. Lolo, Ulukita, Utatao; Goals: Paea (2)	Report	Tries: Benson (2), Attard, Dallas, Sammut; Goals: Sammut (2)

St Marys Stadium, Sydney
Attendance: ≈1,100
Referee: Cameron Turner (Australia)

=== Papua New Guinea vs Australian PM's XIII (women) ===
6 October 2018

Papua New Guinea	4 – 40	(Australia) Australian Prime Minister's XIII
Tries: Kaupa	Report	Tries: Tungai (3), Quinn, Revell-Blair, Young, George, Mafi; Goals: Tungai (3), Dodd (1)

PNG Football Stadium, Port Moresby
Attendance: 14,007

=== Euro B ===
6 October 2018
15:00 CEST (UTC+02:00)

Spain	32–24	Russia
Tries: Pallares (3), Doutres (2), Franco, Puerta; Goals: Franco (1/3), R. Garcia (1/1), Delgado (0/2), Olivares (0/1), Pallares (0/1)	Report	Tries: Danilov, Konstantinov, Leskov, Lysokon; Goals: Lysokon (4/5)

Poliesportiu Quatre Carreres, Valencia
Referee: Geoffrey Poumes (France)
Player of the Match: Romain Pallares (Spain)

Team details

FB	9	Luc Franco
WG	2	Dani Morales
CE	3	Antonio Puerta
CE	4	Alex Doutres
WG	5	Hadriel Mehamed Gonzalez
FE	16	Daniel Garcia
HB	7	Romain Pallares
PR	8	Carlos Font
HK	1	Chris Lopez
PR	10	Adria Alonso
SR	11	Anthony Delgado
SR	12	Kevin Aparicio
LK	15	Raul Simo (c)
Interchange:
BE	14	Aitor Romero
BE	17	Juan Mudarra
BE	18	Rafael Garcia
BE	19	Miguel Olivares
Coach:
Darren Fisher

FB	1	Iustin Petrushka
WG	2	Ilia Danilov
CE	3	Igor Abramov
CE	4	Boris Voloskov
WG	5	Andrey Lavrushin
FE	6	Aleksandr Lysokon
HB	7	Denis Tyulenev
PR	8	Sergei Konstantinov (c)
HK	9	Aleksandr Naumov
PR	10	Kirill Bozhko
SR	11	Dmitrii Leskov
SR	12	Vladislav Lesnikov
LK	13	Ivan Troitskii
Interchange:
BE	14	Igor Chuprin
BE	15	Vyacheslav Eremin
BE	16	Andrey Perin
BE	17	Dmitrii Tarasenkov
Coach:
Denis Korolev

=== Serbia vs France ===
7 October 2018

Serbia	2 – 54†	France
	Report (in Serbian)

Makiš Stadium, Belgrade
Attendance: ≈200
Referee: Radoslav Novaković (Serbia)

=== Italy vs South Africa ===
12 October 2018
19:15 AEDT (UTC+11)

Italy	18 – 8	South Africa
Tries: Pelligra, Petralia, Santi; Goals: Mantellato (3/3)	Report (in Italian)	Tries: Cryer, O'Donovan; Goals: Cryer (0/2)

Kellyville Ridge Reserve, Sydney
Attendance: ≈220
Referee: Robert McDonald (Australia)

Team details

FB	1	Samuel Dolores
WG	2	Dallas Greco
CE	3	Nick Okladnikov
CE	4	Josh Mantellato
WG	5	Brock Pelligra
FE	6	Daniel Petralia
HB	7	Terry Campese
PR	8	Brenden Santi (c)
HK	9	Vinnie Ripepi
PR	10	John Trimboli
SR	11	Dominic Biondi
SR	12	Gioele Celerino
LK	13	Rhys Sciglitano
Interchange:
BE	15	Simone Boscolo
BE	16	Matt Bonanno
BE	18	Anthony Curcio
BE	19	Nick Serafino
Coach:
Leo Epifania

FB	1	Tyler Thomas
WG	2	Darren O'Donovan
CE	3	Byron Hutchinson
CE	4	Will Smith
WG	5	Juan Benadie
FE	6	Coby Thomas
HB	7	Kam Cryer
PR	8	Joel Tubbs
HK	9	Hugo De Villiers
PR	10	Zach van Loggerenberg
SR	11	Shane Gillham
SR	12	Seth Buckley
LK	13	Marcelle Viljoen (c)
Interchange:
BE	14	Andre Joubert
BE	15	Erasmus van Zyl
BE	16	Gary Bautz
BE	17	Tjaart van der Walt
Coach:
Jon Wilson

=== New Zealand vs Australia ===
==== Women ====
13 October 2018
17:00 NZDT (UTC+13)

New Zealand	24 – 26	Australia
Tries: Veainu (2), Feterika, Kani, Nuuausala; Goals: Nicholls (2/4), Nati (0/1)	Report	Tries: Kelly (2), Brigginshaw, Gray, Robinson; Goals: Baker (3/5)

Mount Smart Stadium, Auckland
Referee: Paki Parkinson (New Zealand)

Team details

FB	1	Apii Nicholls-Pualau
WG	2	Karley Te Kawa
CE	3	Honey Hireme (c)
CE	4	Maitua Feterika
WG	5	Langi Veainu
FE	6	Raecene McGregor
HB	7	Kimiora Nati
PR	8	Ngatokotoru Arakua
HK	9	Nita Maynard
PR	10	Aieshaleigh Smalley
SR	11	Onjeurlina Leiataua
SR	12	Teuila Fotu-Moala
LK	13	Laura Mariu (c)
Interchange:
BE	14	Georgia Hale
BE	15	Annetta Nuuausala
BE	16	Sui Tauaua-Pauaraisa
BE	17	Amber Kani
Coach:
Kelvin Wright

FB	1	Chelsea Baker
WG	2	Julia Robinson
CE	3	Hannah Southwell
CE	4	Isabelle Kelly
WG	5	Karina Brown
FE	6	Ali Brigginshaw (c)
HB	7	Zahara Temara
PR	8	Heather Ballinger
HK	9	Brittany Breayley
PR	10	Elianna Walton
SR	11	Kezie Apps
SR	17	Tazmin Gray
LK	13	Simaima Taufa
Interchange:
BE	12	Holli Wheeler
BE	14	Keeley Davis
BE	15	Steph Hancock
BE	16	Annette Brander
Coach:
Brad Donald

Man of the Match:
Heather Ballinger (Australia)

Touch judges:
Joseph Green (New Zealand)
Rochelle Tamarua (New Zealand)
Video referees:
Jared Maxwell (Australia)
Luke Patten (Australia)

==== Men ====
13 October 2018
19:45 NZDT (UTC+13)

New Zealand	26 – 24	Australia
Tries: Manu, Marsters, Maumalo, Rapana, Smith; Goals: Johnson (3/5)	Report	Tries: Gagai, Holmes, Kaufusi, Tedesco; Goals: Holmes (4/4)

Mount Smart Stadium, Auckland
Attendance: 12,763
Referee: Ashley Klein (Australia)

Team details

FB	1	Dallin Watene-Zelezniak (c)
WG	2	Ken Maumalo
CE	3	Esan Marsters
CE	4	Joseph Manu
WG	5	Jordan Rapana
FE	6	Shaun Johnson
HB	7	Kodi Nikorima
PR	8	Jesse Bromwich
HK	9	Brandon Smith
PR	10	Jared Waerea-Hargreaves
SR	11	Kevin Proctor
SR	12	Isaac Liu
LK	13	James Fisher-Harris
Interchange:
BE	14	Kenny Bromwich
BE	15	Leeson Ah Mau
BE	16	Martin Taupau
BE	17	Adam Blair
Coach:
Michael Maguire

FB	1	James Tedesco
WG	2	Dane Gagai
CE	3	Tom Trbojevic
CE	4	Latrell Mitchell
WG	5	Valentine Holmes
FE	6	Luke Keary
HB	7	Daly Cherry-Evans
PR	8	David Klemmer
HK	9	Damien Cook
PR	10	Jordan McLean
SR	11	Boyd Cordner (c)
SR	12	Felise Kaufusi
LK	13	Josh McGuire
Interchange:
BE	14	Ben Hunt
BE	15	Jake Trbojevic
BE	16	Tyson Frizell
BE	17	Aaron Woods
Coach:
Mal Meninga

Man of the Match:
Shaun Johnson (New Zealand)

Touch judges:
Nick Beashel (Australia)
David Munro (Australia)
Video referees:
Steve Chiddy (Australia)
Ben Galea (Australia)

Notes:

- Joseph Manu, Brandon Smith (both New Zealand), Damien Cook, Luke Keary, and Latrell Mitchell (all Australia) made their Test debuts, while James Tedesco made his debut for Australia having previously represented Italy.

=== Sweden vs Norway ===
13 October 2018

Sweden	6 – 46	Norway
	Report

Goteborg

=== Euro B ===
13 October 2018
15:00 MSK (UTC+03:00)

Russia	36–18	Serbia
Tries: Lysokon (2), Konstantinov, Leskov, Lesnikov, Orlov, Zagoskin; Goals: Lysokon (4/8)	Report	Tries: Jašari, Keglić, Trifunović; Goals: Vo. Dedić (3/4)

Fili Stadium, Moscow
Attendance: 300
Referee: Liam Moore (England)
Player of the Match: Aleksandr Lysokon (Russia)

=== England vs France ===
17 October 2018
19:45 BST (UTC+01)

England	44 – 6	France
Tries: Johnstone, T. Burgess, Connor, Myler, Thompson, Whitehead; Goals: Connor (5/7), Percival (1/1)	Report (in French)	Tries: Fages; Goals: Barthau (1/1)

Leigh Sports Village, Leigh
Attendance: 5,144
Referee: Chris Kendall (England)

Team details

FB	1	Jamie Shaul
WG	2	Tom Johnstone
CE	3	Reece Lyne
CE	4	Mark Percival
WG	5	Jermaine McGillvary
FE	6	Richie Myler
HB	7	Jake Connor
PR	8	James Graham (c)
HK	9	Josh Hodgson
PR	10	Tom Burgess
SR	11	Oliver Holmes
SR	12	Elliott Whitehead
LK	13	George Burgess
Interchange:
BE	14	Adam Milner
BE	15	Luke Thompson
BE	16	Robbie Mulhern
BE	17	Liam Sutcliffe
Coach:
Wayne Bennett

FB	1	Stanislas Robin
WG	25	Paul Marcon
CE	3	Bastien Ader
CE	4	Tony Gigot
WG	5	Hakim Miloudi
FE	6	Théo Fages
HB	7	William Barthau
PR	8	Bastien Canet
HK	23	Alrix Da Costa
PR	10	Lambert Belmas
SR	13	Mickael Goudemand
SR	12	Benjamin Jullien
LK	24	Jason Baitieri (c)
Interchange:
BE	14	Thibault Margalet
BE	16	Bastien Escamilla
BE	17	Valentin Yesa
BE	22	Anthony Marion
Coach:
Aurélien Cologni

Notes:

- Oliver Holmes, Tom Johnstone, Reece Lyne, Adam Milner, Jamie Shaul, Liam Sutcliffe, Luke Thompson (all England), Lambert Belmas, Paul Marcon, and Anthony Marion (all France) made their Test debuts, while Robbie Mulhern made his debut for England having previously represented Ireland.

=== Colombia vs El Salvador ===
20 October 2018
15:00 AEST (UTC+10)

Colombia	10 – 48	El Salvador
Tries: Vasquez, Rivera; Goals: Perico Daza (1)	Report	Tries: M. Maatouk (2), Alarcon (2), Reyes Kiwi Kiwi (2), A. Maatouk, A. Maatouk, Schubert-Ariaza; Goals: Mendoza (4), Zamora-Rivera (1), Godinez (1)

Underwood Park, Brisbane
Attendance: ≈300
Referee: Sean Teuma (Australia)

=== Tonga vs Australia ===
20 October 2018
19:45 NZDT (UTC+13)

Tonga	16 – 34	Australia
Tries: Kata, Pangai Jnr, Tupou; Goals: Lolohea (1/1), Taukeiaho (1/2)	Report	Tries: Holmes (2), T. Trbojevic (2), Cherry-Evans, Tedesco; Goals: Holmes (5/7)

Mount Smart Stadium, Auckland
Attendance: 26,214
Referee: Gerard Sutton (Australia)

Team details

FB	1	Will Hopoate
WG	2	Daniel Tupou
CE	3	Michael Jennings
CE	4	Solomone Kata
WG	5	David Fusitu'a
FE	6	Tuimoala Lolohea
HB	7	Ata Hingano
PR	8	Andrew Fifita
HK	9	Siliva Havili
PR	10	Sio Siua Taukeiaho
SR	11	Tevita Pangai Junior
SR	12	Sika Manu (c)
LK	13	Jason Taumalolo
Interchange:
BE	14	Sione Katoa
BE	15	Addin Fonua-Blake
BE	16	Joe Ofahengaue
BE	21	Ben Murdoch-Masila
Coach:
Kristian Woolf

FB	1	James Tedesco
WG	2	Dane Gagai
CE	3	Tom Trbojevic
CE	4	Latrell Mitchell
WG	5	Valentine Holmes
FE	6	Luke Keary
HB	7	Daly Cherry-Evans
PR	8	David Klemmer
HK	9	Damien Cook
PR	10	Jordan McLean
SR	11	Boyd Cordner (c)
SR	12	Felise Kaufusi
LK	13	Josh McGuire
Interchange:
BE	14	Ben Hunt
BE	15	Jake Trbojevic
BE	16	Tyson Frizell
BE	17	Aaron Woods
Coach:
Mal Meninga

Man of the Match:
James Tedesco (Australia)

Touch judges:
Nick Beashel (Australia)
David Munro (Australia)
Video referees:
Steve Chiddy (Australia)
Ben Galea (Australia)

Notes:

- The Australian players agreed to a one-time reduction of their $20,000 match payments in order to make this match financially viable.

=== Euro B ===
20 October 2018
14:30 CEST (UTC+02:00)

Serbia	24–20	Spain
Tries: Janjić, Kress, Milutinović, Stevanović, Zogović; Goals: Vo. Dedić (2/5)	Report	Tries: Delgado, Franco, Simo; Goals: R. Garcia (4/5)

Makiš Stadium, Belgrade
Attendance: 150
Referee: Tom Grant (England)
Player of the Match: Luc Franco (Spain)

=== Knights Tour of Papua New Guinea ===
27 October 2018
15:00 PGT (UTC+10)

Papua New Guinea	12 – 16	England Reserves
Tries: Ipape, Meninga, Nima; Goals: W. Boas (0/3)	Report	Tries: Davies, Lineham, Sutcliffe; Goals: Patton (2/3)

Lae Oval, Lae
Referee: Jon Stone (Australia)

3 November 2018
15:30 PGT (UTC+10)

Papua New Guinea	32 – 22	England Reserves
Tries: A. Boas, Macdonald, Mead, Olam, Putt; Goals: W. Boas (6/6)	Report	Tries: Lineham (2), Davies, J. Walker; Goals: Patton (3/3), Livett (0/1)

PNG Football Stadium, Port Moresby
Referee: Jon Stone (Australia)

=== Italy vs Niue ===
27 October 2018
16:00 AEDT (UTC+11)

Italy	36 – 32	Niue
Tries: Santi (2), Celerino, Dolores, Ripepi, Scarpelli; Goals: Mantellato (5/5), Santi (1/1)		Tries: Schaumkel (2), Luisi, Paea, Sipley, Utatao; Goals: Paea (4/6)

Marconi Stadium, Sydney
Attendance: ≈250
Referee: Dante Liu (Australia)

=== France vs England (women) ===
27 October 2018
14:00 CEST (UTC+02)

France	4 – 54	England
Tries: Bedu	Report	Tries: Greenfield (2), Beevers (2), Stanley (2), Roche (2), Hardcastle, Marshall, Williams; Goals: Stanley (5/11)

Stade Albert Domec, Carcassonne

=== Euro A ===
27 October 2018
14:00 IST (UTC+01:00)

Ireland	36−10	Scotland
Tries: Higginson (2), Bentley, McCarthy, McMahon, O'Donnell, Ryan; Goals: Finn (4/7)	Report	Tries: Glohe, Kavangh; Goals: Brierley (1/2)

Morton Stadium, Santry
Attendance: 200
Referee: Tom Grant (England)

Notes:

- James Bentley, Lewis Bienek, Liam Byrne, Jack Higginson, Ronan Michael, Declan O'Donnell, Ethan Ryan, Michael Ward (all Ireland), Davey Dixon, Nick Glohe, Finn Hutchison, Sam Luckley, Murray Mitchell, Kieran Moran, and Luke Westman (all Scotland) made their Test debuts.

27 October 2018
18:00 CEST (UTC+02:00)

France	54–18	Wales
Tries: Escaré (2), Marcon (2), Ader, Curran, Gigot, Miloudi, Navarette; Goals: Gigot (7/8), Albert (1/1), Curran (1/1)	Report	Tries: Kear, Olds, Ralph; Goals: Olds (3/3)

Stade Albert Domec, Carcassonne
Attendance: 4,055
Referee: James Child (England)

Notes:

- Rhys Curran (France), Connor Davies, Curtis Davies, Sion Jones, and James Olds (all Wales) made their Test debuts, while Chris Vitalini made his debut for Wales after previously representing Italy.

2 November 2018
19:30 GMT (UTC+00:00)

Scotland	12–50	Wales
Tries: Bell, Dixon; Goals: Brierley (2/2)	Report	Tries: Williams (3), Jenkins (2), Ralph (2), Butler, Evans; Goals: Olds (7/9)

Netherdale, Galashiels
Attendance: 250
Referee: Ben Casty (France)

Notes:

- Craig Borthwick, Craig Robertson (both Scotland), Mike Butt, and Elliott Jenkins (both Wales) made their Test debuts.

3 November 2018
14:00 GMT (UTC+00:00)

Ireland	10–24	France
Tries: McNally, Ryan; Goals: Finn (1/2)	Report	Tries: De Costa (2), Ader, Marcon; Goals: Gigot (4/5)

Morton Stadium, Santry
Attendance: 250
Referee: Scott Mikalauskas (England)

Notes:

- Ed O'Keefe (Ireland) made his Test debut.
- France became the 9th team to qualify for the 2021 Rugby League World Cup.

10 November 2018
18:00 CET (UTC+01:00)

France	28–10	Scotland
Tries: Escaré (2), Fages, Marion; Goals: Escaré (6/6)	Report	Tries: Dixon, Robertson; Goals: Brierley (0/1), Thomas (1/1)

Stade Albert Domec, Carcassonne
Attendance: 2,854
Referee: Greg Dolan (England)

Notes:

- Gavin Marguerite (France), Hamish Bentley, Matt Hogg, Niall Sidney, and Dan Turland (all Scotland) made their Test debuts.

11 November 2018
15:00 GMT (UTC+00:00)

Wales	40–8	Ireland
Tries: Bennion, Butler, Evans, Lloyd, Ralph, Williams; Goals: Olds (8/10)	Report	Tries: Grix, King; Goals: Finn (0/2)

Racecourse Ground, Wrexham
Attendance: 1,257
Referee: Gareth Hewer (England)

Notes:

- Wales became the 10th team to qualify for the 2021 Rugby League World Cup.

=== Baskerville Shield ===
2018 Baskerville Shield

27 October 2018
14:30 BST (UTC+01)

England	18–16	New Zealand
Tries: Connor, Gildart, Tomkins; Goals: Connor (3/4)	Report	Tries: Marsters, Watene-Zelezniak; Goals: Johnson (4/4)

KCOM Stadium, Kingston-upon-Hull
Attendance: 17,649
Referee: Robert Hicks (England)

Team details

FB	1	Jonny Lomax
WG	2	Tommy Makinson
CE	3	Jake Connor
CE	4	Oliver Gildart
WG	5	Jermaine McGillvary
FE	6	George Williams
HB	7	Sam Tomkins
PR	15	Tom Burgess
HK	9	Josh Hodgson
PR	10	James Graham
SR	11	John Bateman
SR	12	Elliott Whitehead
LK	13	Sean O'Loughlin (c)
Interchange:
BE	8	Chris Hill
BE	14	Luke Thompson
BE	16	George Burgess
BE	17	Daryl Clark
Coach:
Wayne Bennett

FB	1	Dallin Watene-Zelezniak (c)
WG	2	Ken Maumalo
CE	3	Esan Marsters
CE	4	Joseph Manu
WG	5	Jordan Rapana
FE	6	Shaun Johnson
HB	7	Kodi Nikorima
PR	8	Jesse Bromwich
HK	9	Brandon Smith
PR	10	Jared Waerea-Hargreaves
SR	11	Kevin Proctor
SR	12	Isaac Liu
LK	13	James Fisher-Harris
Interchange:
BE	14	Kenny Bromwich
BE	15	Leeson Ah Mau
BE	16	Martin Taupau
BE	19	Joseph Tapine
Coach:
Michael Maguire

Man of the Match:
Elliott Whitehead (England)

Touch judges:
Chris Kendall (England)
Richard Thompson (England)
Video referee:
Ben Thaler (England)

Notes:

- Oliver Gildart (England) made his Test debut.

2018 Baskerville Shield

4 November 2018
14:30 GMT (UTC+00)

England	20–14	New Zealand
Tries: Makinson (3), Connor; Goals: Tomkins (1/1), Connor (1/4)	Report	Tries: Maumalo, Watene-Zelezniak; Goals: Johnson (3/3)

Anfield, Liverpool
Attendance: 26,234
Referee: Gerard Sutton (Australia)

Team details

FB	1	Jonny Lomax
WG	2	Tommy Makinson
CE	3	Jake Connor
CE	4	Oliver Gildart
WG	5	Jermaine McGillvary
FE	6	George Williams
HB	7	Sam Tomkins
PR	15	Tom Burgess
HK	9	Josh Hodgson
PR	10	James Graham (c)
SR	11	John Bateman
SR	12	Elliott Whitehead
LK	13	Luke Thompson
Interchange:
BE	8	Chris Hill
BE	14	Adam Milner
BE	16	George Burgess
BE	17	Daryl Clark
Coach:
Wayne Bennett

FB	1	Dallin Watene-Zelezniak (c)
WG	2	Ken Maumalo
CE	3	Esan Marsters
CE	4	Joseph Manu
WG	5	Jordan Rapana
FE	6	Shaun Johnson
HB	7	Kodi Nikorima
PR	8	Jesse Bromwich
HK	9	Brandon Smith
PR	10	Jared Waerea-Hargreaves
SR	11	Kevin Proctor
SR	12	Isaac Liu
LK	13	Adam Blair
Interchange:
BE	14	Kenny Bromwich
BE	15	Leeson Ah Mau
BE	16	Martin Taupau
BE	17	James Fisher-Harris
Coach:
Michael Maguire

Man of the Match:
Tommy Makinson (England)

Touch judges:
James Child (England)
Liam Moore (England)
Video referee:
Ben Thaler (England)

2018 Baskerville Shield

11 November 2018
15:15 GMT (UTC+00)

England	0–34	New Zealand
	Report	Tries: Maumalo (2), J. Bromwich, Liu, Nikorima, Tapine; Goals: Johnson (4/5), Papali'i (1/1)

Elland Road, Leeds
Attendance: 32,186
Referee: Gerard Sutton (Australia)

Team details

FB	1	Jonny Lomax
WG	2	Tommy Makinson
CE	3	Jake Connor
CE	4	Oliver Gildart
WG	5	Jermaine McGillvary
FE	6	George Williams
HB	7	Richie Myler
PR	15	Tom Burgess
HK	9	Josh Hodgson
PR	10	James Graham (c)
SR	11	John Bateman
SR	12	Elliott Whitehead
LK	13	Luke Thompson
Interchange:
BE	8	Chris Hill
BE	14	Adam Milner
BE	16	Joe Greenwood
BE	17	Stefan Ratchford
Coach:
Wayne Bennett

FB	1	Dallin Watene-Zelezniak (c)
WG	2	Ken Maumalo
CE	3	Esan Marsters
CE	4	Joseph Manu
WG	5	Jamayne Isaako
FE	6	Shaun Johnson
HB	7	Kodi Nikorima
PR	8	Jesse Bromwich
HK	9	Brandon Smith
PR	10	Jared Waerea-Hargreaves
SR	11	Kevin Proctor
SR	12	Isaac Liu
LK	13	Adam Blair
Interchange:
BE	14	Kenny Bromwich
BE	15	Leeson Ah Mau
BE	16	Isaiah Papali'i
BE	17	Joseph Tapine
Coach:
Michael Maguire

Man of the Match:
Kodi Nikorima (New Zealand)

Touch judges:
James Child (England)
Liam Moore (England)
Video referee:
Phil Bentham (England)

Notes:

- Joe Greenwood (England) made his Test debut, while Isaiah Papali'i made his debut for New Zealand having previously represented Samoa.

== November ==
=== France vs Italy (women) ===
10 November 2018
14:00 CET (UTC+01)

France	60 – 0	Italy
Tries: Anton (2), Moinache (2), Guehaseim, Bessahli, Bedu, Olm Rouppert, Fourage, Alverhne, Himoudi, Bouguessa; Goals: T. Coll (6)	Report (in French)

Stade Albert Domec, Carcassonne
Referee: Mohamed Drizza (France)

=== Americas Championship ===
First semi-final

13 November 2018
17:30 EDT (UTC−04:00)

Canada	8–38	Jamaica
Tries: Borggren, McGoff	Report	Tries: B. Jones-Bishop (2), A. Brown, Bryan, Golding, Magrin, Thomas; Goals: Coleman (5/7)

Hodges Stadium, Jacksonville
Referee: Ben Thaler (England)

Second semi-final

13 November 2018
20:00 EDT (UTC−04:00)

United States	62–0	Chile
Tries: Anderson (4), Burroughs (3), Faraimo (2), Offerdahl (2), Donehue, Howard; Goals: Faraimo (5/13)	Report

Hodges Stadium, Jacksonville
Referee: Geoffrey Poumes (France)

Third-place play-off

17 November 2018
13:30 EDT (UTC−04:00)

Canada	62–12	Chile
Tries: Calvert (2), Mastroianni (2), McInroy (2), Hulett, Jacks, McKenzie, Miller, Schouten; Goals: Calvert (9/11)	Report	Tries: Garrido (2); Goals: Horvat (2/2)

Hodges Stadium, Jacksonville
Referee: Geoffrey Poumes (France)

Championship final

17 November 2018
16:00 EDT (UTC−04:00)

United States	10–16	Jamaica
Tries: Burroughs, Donehue; Goals: Faraimo (1/2)	Report	Tries: Ogden, Farrell; Goals: Coleman (4/6)

Hodges Stadium, Jacksonville
Referee: Ben Thaler (England)

Notes:

- In their seventh meeting, this was the first time Jamaica has won against the United States.
- Jamaica became the 11th team to qualify for the 2021 Rugby League World Cup.

=== South American Championship ===
23 November 2018
15:00 BST (UTC-2)

Brazil	52 – 14	Colombia
	Report

São Paulo, Brazil

Notes:

- This was a part of the 2018 South American Cup.

24 November 2018
14:00 BST (UTC-2)

Colombia	16 – 28	Argentina
	Report

São Paulo, Brazil

Notes:

- This was a part of the 2018 South American Cup.

25 November 2018
16:00 BST (UTC-2)

Brazil	22 – 20	Argentina
	Report

São Paulo, Brazil

Notes:

- This was a part of the 2018 South American Cup.

=== Women's South American Championship ===
25 November 2018
13:30 BST (UTC-2)

Brazil	48 – 0	Argentina
	Report

São Paulo, Brazil
