= 2018 Emerging Nations World Championship =

Rugby tournament

- Number of teams: 11
- Host country: Australia
- Winner: Malta
- Matches played: 22
- Attendance: 8,532 (388 per match)
- Points scored: 1025 (46.59 per match)
- Top scorer: (Poland) Ethan Niszczot (60)
- Top try scorers: (Poland) Chippie Korostchuk (6) (Niue) Justice Utatao (6)

The 2018 Emerging Nations World Championship (ENWC) was a rugby league tournament held for Tier Two and Tier Three nations, the third edition of the Rugby League Emerging Nations Tournament.

== Background ==
Several nations that had not qualified, or were not eligible to qualify, for the 2017 Rugby League World Cup planned to contest an Emerging Nations tournament in Sydney in 2017 alongside the World Cup. However this tournament did not get support from the Rugby League International Federation, and did not go ahead.

On 29 March 2017, the Rugby League International Federation announced that Australia would host the tournament in 2018. The two-week-long tournament was held in Western Sydney, New South Wales with games taking place in Windsor, St Marys and Cabramatta.

== Teams ==
Ten teams were already confirmed for the tournament by March 2017 with a number of others later also announcing their participation. 15 teams were expected to compete, though Canada, India, Latvia, and Thailand were not included in the final draw, for unspecified reasons.

| Nation | Coach | Notable players | RLIF Rank (Jul 2018) |
|---|---|---|---|
| Greece | Steve Georgallis | Stefanos Bastas, Michael Korkidas, Jordan Meads | 26 |
| Hong Kong | Jason Fairleigh | – | 45 |
| Hungary | Jonathan Wilson | Stuart Flanagan | 21 |
| Japan | Viliami Ahosivi | Gehamat Shibasaki | 41 |
| Malta | Peter Cassar & Aaron McDonald | Tyler Cassel, Jarrod Sammut, Sam Stone | 18 |
| Niue | Brendan Perenara | Zebastian Lucky Luisi, Eddie Paea, Sione Tovo | 34 |
| Philippines | Arwin Marcus | Shane Gray, Payne Haas, Paul Sheedy | 27 |
| Poland | Lee Addison | Harry Siejka | – |
| Solomon Islands | John Jewiss & Luke Heckendorf | – | 42 |
| Turkey | Scott Hartas | Emre Guler, Aidan Sezer, Jansin Turgut | – |
| Vanuatu | Lionel Harbin | Alehana Mara | 36 |

Four multi-country regional teams competed in a parallel tournament. This was won by the Mediterranean-Middle East team who defeated Africa United in the final.

| Region | Organising body | Eligible countries |
|---|---|---|
| Africa | Africa United Rugby League | 54 sovereign states of Africa. Algeria, Angola, Benin, Botswana, Burkina Faso, Burundi, Cape Verde, Cameroon, Central African Republic, Chad, Comoros, Congo, Cote d'Ivoire, Djibouti, DR Congo, Egypt, Equatorial Guinea, Eritrea, Ethiopia, Gabon, Gambia, Ghana, Guinea, Guinea-Bissau, Kenya, Lesotho, Liberia, Libya, Madagascar, Malawi, Mali, Mauritania, Mauritius, Morocco, Mozambique, Namibia, Niger, Nigeria, Rwanda, São Tomé and Príncipe, Senegal, Seychelles, Sierra Leone, Somalia, South Africa, South Sudan, Sudan, Swaziland, Tanzania, Togo, Tunisia, Uganda, Zambia, and Zimbabwe. |
| Latin America | Latin Heat Rugby League | 23 sovereign states in the Americas, plus Puerto Rico. Argentina, Belize, Bolivia, Brazil, Chile, Colombia, Costa Rica, Cuba, Dominican Republic, Ecuador, El Salvador, Guatemala, Guyana, Haiti, Honduras, Mexico, Nicaragua, Panama, Paraguay, Peru, Puerto Rico, Suriname, Uruguay, and Venezuela. |
| Mediterranean | Mediterranean Rugby League | |
| South East Asia | ASEAN RL Association | |

== Venues ==
The venues are located in the Western region of the Sydney metropolis.
- Cabramatta: New Era Stadium, home of the Cabramatta Two Blues, has previously hosted four international fixtures: Philippines vs Serbia (2016), Philippines vs Malta, Lebanon vs Malta, and Malta vs Hungary (all 2017).
- Kellyville: Kellyville Ridge Reserve, all-weather synthetic pitch previously unused at any level, hosted games on 7 October as Cabramatta was closed due to flooding.
- St Marys: St Marys Leagues Stadium, home of the St Marys Saints, has previously hosted six international fixtures: Fiji vs Tonga, Samoa vs Cook Islands, Lebanon vs Malta (all 2006), Lebanon vs Malta (2015), Malta vs Hungary, South Africa vs Malta (both 2018). It contains a 520-seat grandstand and has a total capacity of 7,000.
- Windsor: Windsor Sporting Complex, home of the Windsor Wolves, has not previously hosted an international fixture.

== Pool stage ==
Tournament fixtures were announced on 16 July 2018. The pool stage began on 1 October and concluded on 7 October. The six highest ranked teams were split between Pool A and B, while Pool C consisted of the five lowest ranked teams.

=== Pool A ===
| Pos | Team | Pld | W | D | L | PF | PA | PD | Pts | Qualification |
|---|---|---|---|---|---|---|---|---|---|---|
| 1 | Niue | 2 | 2 | 0 | 0 | 50 | 28 | +22 | 4 | Advances to Cup play-off |
| 2 | Malta | 2 | 1 | 0 | 1 | 52 | 36 | +16 | 2 | Advances to Cup play-off |
| 3 | Philippines | 2 | 0 | 0 | 2 | 22 | 60 | −38 | 0 | Advances to Trophy play-off |

1 October 2018
13:30 AEST (UTC+10)

| Malta | 36 – 10 | Philippines |
|---|---|---|
| Tries: K. Cassel (3), Attard, Benson, Rodrigues, S. Stone; Goals: Benson (4/7) | Report | Tries: Bien, Mackey; Goals: Bien (1/1), Wiggins (0/1) |

Windsor Sporting Complex, Sydney
Attendance: ≈750
Referee: Blake Williams (Australia)

4 October 2018
11:55 AEST (UTC+10)

| Malta | 16 – 26 | Niue |
|---|---|---|
| Tries: Campbell, T. Cassel, Muscat; Goals: Benson (2/3) | Report | Tries: Utatao (2), G. Lolo, Schaumkel, Tamasi; Goals: Paea (3/4), Samoa (0/1) |

St Marys Stadium, Sydney
Attendance: ≈500
Referee: Mitchell Robinson (Australia)

7 October 2018
12:20 AEDT (UTC+11)

| Philippines | 12 – 24 | Niue |
|---|---|---|
| Tries: Sheedy, Jensen; Goals: Bien (2) | Report | Tries: Utatao (2), Schaumkel, Payne, G. Lolo; Goals: Samoa (2) |

Kellyville Ridge Reserve, Sydney
Attendance: ≈350
Referee: Cameron Turner (Australia)

=== Pool B ===
| Pos | Team | Pld | W | D | L | PF | PA | PD | Pts | Qualification |
|---|---|---|---|---|---|---|---|---|---|---|
| 1 | Hungary | 2 | 2 | 0 | 0 | 38 | 31 | +7 | 4 | Advances to Cup play-off |
| 2 | Greece | 2 | 1 | 0 | 1 | 56 | 20 | +36 | 2 | Advances to Cup play-off |
| 3 | Vanuatu | 2 | 0 | 0 | 2 | 13 | 56 | −43 | 0 | Advances to Trophy play-off |

1 October 2018
17:00 AEST (UTC+10)

| Hungary | 20 – 18 | Greece |
|---|---|---|
| Tries: D. Ivan, Kovac, Turay, Varga; Goals: J. Farkas (2/4) | Report | Tries: Mamouzelos, Stratis, A. Vrahnos; Goals: Stratis (3/3) |

Windsor Sporting Complex, Sydney
Attendance: ≈750
Referee: Dillan Wells (Australia)

4 October 2018
17:00 AEST (UTC+10)

| Hungary | 18 – 13 | Vanuatu |
|---|---|---|
| Tries: N. Farkas, Gerecs; Goals: J. Farkas | Report | Tries: James Wood, Amani Arutahiki; Goals: Andrew Kaltongga (2); Drop goals: Mara |

St Marys Stadium, Sydney
Attendance: ≈120
Referee: Ethan Murray (Australia)

7 October 2018
18:45 AEDT (UTC+11)

| Greece | 38 – 0 | Vanuatu |
|---|---|---|
| Tries: A. Vrahnos, G. Tsikrikas, Zampetides, Mamouzelos, L. Zarounas, C. Hughes, Constantinou; Goals: Stratis (5) | Report |

Kellyville Ridge Reserve, Sydney
Attendance: ≈125
Referee: Joey Butler (Australia)

=== Pool C ===
| Pos | Team | Pld | W | D | L | PF | PA | PD | Pts | Qualification |
|---|---|---|---|---|---|---|---|---|---|---|
| 1 | Poland | 2 | 2 | 0 | 0 | 120 | 12 | +108 | 4 | Advances to Trophy play-off |
| 2 | Turkey | 2 | 2 | 0 | 0 | 90 | 22 | +68 | 4 | Advances to Trophy play-off |
| 3 | Solomon Islands | 2 | 1 | 0 | 1 | 54 | 42 | +12 | 2 | Advances to Plate play-off |
| 4 | Hong Kong | 2 | 0 | 0 | 2 | 18 | 94 | -76 | 0 | Advances to Plate play-off |
| 5 | Japan | 2 | 0 | 0 | 2 | 6 | 118 | -112 | 0 | Advances to Plate play-off |

1 October 2018
15:15 AEST (UTC+10)

| Turkey | 30 – 22 | Solomon Islands |
|---|---|---|
| Tries: Dalcik (2), A. Salman-Cochrane (2), Er, Bökeyhan Sürer; Goals: Bökeyhan Sürer (3/4), H. Karabork (0/2) | Report | Tries: Maebata (2), Kaipua, Tengemoana; Goals: Sanga (2/3), Moe'ava (1/1) |

Windsor Sporting Complex, Sydney
Attendance: ≈750
Referee: Cameron Turner (Australia)

4 October 2018
13:40 AEST (UTC+10)

| Japan | 0 – 60 | Turkey |
|---|---|---|
| | Report | Tries: Bökeyhan Sürer (3), Turgut (2), Erten, Dagdanasar, A. Karabork, Baskonyali, Celikutan; Goals: Bökeyhan Sürer (7/9), Dagdanasar (1/1), J. Salman-Cochrane (0/1) |

St Marys Stadium, Sydney
Attendance: ≈500
Referee: Robert Morey (Australia)

4 October 2018
15:20 AEST (UTC+10)

| Hong Kong | 6 – 62 | Poland |
|---|---|---|
| Tries: McMurrich; Goals: Lindsay (1/1) | Report | Tries: Korostchuk (3), S. Maslanka (2), M. Maslanka (2), Metuangaro (2), Mykietyn (2), Niszczot; Goals: Niszczot (7) |

St Marys Stadium, Sydney
Attendance: ≈500
Referee: Blake Williams (Australia)

7 October 2018
14:00 AEDT (UTC+11)

| Solomon Islands | 32 – 12 | Hong Kong |
|---|---|---|
| Tries: Singamoana (2), Angikimua, Momoa, Sanga, Sa'omatangi, L. Tongaka; Goals: Moe'ava (2/5), Sanga (0/2) | Report | Tries: Griffiths, Waugh; Goals: Lindsay (2/2) |

Kellyville Ridge Reserve, Sydney
Attendance: ≈250
Referee: Dillan Wells (Australia)

7 October 2018
17:10 AEDT (UTC+11)

| Japan | 6 – 58 | Poland |
|---|---|---|
| Tries: F. Karino; Goals: F. Karino | Report | Tries: M. Maslanka (2), Niszczot (2), Artsivourtis, Bryan, Mikalowski, Niedzwiecki, Szczerbanik, Usher; Goals: Niszczot (9) |

Kellyville Ridge Reserve, Sydney
Attendance: ≈220
Referee: Joseph Green (Australia)

== Play-offs ==
The play-off stage began on 9 October and concluded on 13 October. The teams were split into Cup, Trophy, and Plate play-offs based on their results in the pool stage.

=== Cup ===
Cup semi-finals
10 October – Cabramatta
Niue | 16
Greece | 8
10 October – Cabramatta
Hungary | 10
Malta | 20

1st place final
13 October – St Marys
Niue | 16
Malta | 24
3rd place final
13 October – St Marys
Greece | 26
Hungary | 18

10 October 2018
12:00 AEST (UTC+10)

| Niue | 16 – 8 | Greece |
|---|---|---|
| Tries: W. Lolo, Payne, Utatao; Goals: Paea (2/3) | Report | Tries: J. Vrahnos; Goals: Stratis (2/2) |

New Era Stadium, Sydney
Attendance: ≈450
Referee: Dillan Wells (Australia)

10 October 2018
13:45 AEST (UTC+10)

| Hungary | 10 – 20 | Malta |
|---|---|---|
| Tries: P. Ivan, Varga; Goals: D. Farkas (1) | Report | Tries: Campbell, T. Cassel, Cregan, Greene; Goals: Benson (2) |

New Era Stadium, Sydney
Attendance: ≈300
Referee: Blake Williams (Australia)

13 October 2018
13:55 AEST (UTC+10)

| Greece | 26 – 18 | Hungary |
|---|---|---|
| Tries: Mamouzelos (2), G. Tsikrikas (2), Stratis; Goals: Stratis (3) | Report | Tries: Acsai, P. Ivan, McKewin; Goals: J. Farkas (3) |

St Marys Stadium (field 2), Sydney
Attendance: ≈350
Referee: Ethan Murray (Australia)

13 October 2018
15:55 AEST (UTC+10)

| Niue | 16 – 24 | Malta |
|---|---|---|
| Tries: G. Lolo, Ulukita, Utatao; Goals: Paea (2) | Report | Tries: Benson (2), Attard, Dallas, Sammut; Goals: Sammut (2) |

St Marys Stadium, Sydney
Attendance: ≈1,100
Referee: Cameron Turner (Australia)

=== Trophy ===
Trophy semi-finals
10 October – Cabramatta
Philippines | 29
Turkey | 16
10 October – Cabramatta
Vanuatu | 4
Poland | 44

5th place final
13 October – St Marys
Philippines | 10
Poland | 14
7th place final
13 October – St Marys
Turkey | 27
Vanuatu | 26

10 October 2018
15:30 AEST (UTC+10)

| Philippines | 29 – 16 | Turkey |
|---|---|---|
| Tries: Goodwin, Gordon, Sheedy, Stephenson, Stubbs; Goals: Wiggins (4); Drop goals: Sheedy | Report | Tries: Dalcik (2), A. Salman-Cochrane; Goals: Bokeyhan Surer (2) |

New Era Stadium, Sydney
Attendance: ≈450
Referee: Ethan Murray (Australia)

10 October 2018
17:15 AEST (UTC+10)

| Vanuatu | 4 – 44 | Poland |
|---|---|---|
| Tries: Arutahiki | Report | Tries: Korostchuk (2), Metuangaro (2), A. Kowalski, Niszczot, H. Siejka, Wertsak; Goals: Niszczot (3), H. Siejka (2), Metuangaro (1) |

New Era Stadium, Sydney
Attendance: ≈150
Referee: Cody Simmons (Australia)

13 October 2018
12:15 AEST (UTC+10)

| Turkey | 27 – 26 | Vanuatu |
|---|---|---|
| Tries: Baskonyali (2), Bokeyhan Surer, Dalcik, P. Salman-Cochrane; Goals: Bokeyhan Surer (3); Drop goals: Baskonyali | Report | Tries: Arutahiki (2), Philip (2), Kaltonga, Napakaurana; Goals: Kaltonga (1) |

St Marys Stadium (field 2), Sydney
Attendance: ≈250
Referee: Mitchell Robinson (Australia)

13 October 2018
14:00 AEST (UTC+10)

| Philippines | 10 – 14 | Poland |
|---|---|---|
| Tries: Goodwin, Kucia; Goals: Bien (1) | Report | Tries: Korostchuk, Niszczot, H. Siejka; Goals: Niszczot (1) |

St Marys Stadium, Sydney
Attendance: ≈500
Referee: Blake Williams (Australia)

=== Plate ===
| Pos | Team | Pld | W | D | L | PF | PA | PD | Pts |
|---|---|---|---|---|---|---|---|---|---|
| 9 | Solomon Islands | 2 | 2 | 0 | 0 | 100 | 36 | +64 | 4 |
| 10 | Japan | 2 | 1 | 0 | 1 | 54 | 74 | -20 | 2 |
| 11 | Hong Kong | 2 | 0 | 0 | 2 | 44 | 88 | -44 | 0 |

9 October 2018
18:30 AEST (UTC+10)

| Solomon Islands | 44 – 22 | Japan |
|---|---|---|
| Tries: Maebata (2), Moe'ava (2), Sanga, Taupongi, Tengemoana, L. Tongaka; Goals: Sanga (5/7), Moe'ava (1/1) | | Tries: Shibasaki (2), Fujitaka, Grieve; Goals: F. Karino (3/4) |

Windsor Sporting Complex, Sydney
Attendance: 45
Referee: Joseph Green (Australia)

11 October 2018
16:30 AEST (UTC+10)

| Hong Kong | 30 – 32 | Japan |
|---|---|---|
| Tries: Griffiths, Lindsay, McMurrich, Ryan, Spence; Goals: Lindsay (5/5) | | Tries: Shibasaki (2), Fujitaka, Fukushige, Gerediaga Etxaburu, Matsuo; Goals: Sugano (4/4), F. Karino (0/3) |

Windsor Sporting Complex, Sydney
Attendance: 22
Referee: Ethan Murray (Australia)

13 October 2018
15:40 AEST (UTC+10)

| Solomon Islands | 56 – 14 | Hong Kong |
|---|---|---|
| Tries: Angikimua (3), Manau (2), Moe'ava (2), Sa'omatangi, Sanga, Singamoana, Tengemoana; Goals: Moe'ava (5/9), Sanga (1/2) | Report | Tries: Barnes, Lindsay, McMurrich; Goals: Barnes (1/1), Lee (0/1), Lindsay (0/1) |

St Marys Stadium (field 2), Sydney
Attendance: ≈100
Referee: Robert Morey (Australia)

== Final positions ==
| Pos | Team | Pld | W | D | L | PF | PA | PD |
|---|---|---|---|---|---|---|---|---|
| 1 | Malta^{Cup Winners} | 4 | 3 | 0 | 1 | 96 | 62 | +34 |
| 2 | Niue | 4 | 3 | 0 | 1 | 82 | 60 | +22 |
| 3 | Greece | 4 | 2 | 0 | 2 | 90 | 54 | +36 |
| 4 | Hungary | 4 | 2 | 0 | 2 | 66 | 77 | -11 |
| 5 | Poland^{Trophy Winners} | 4 | 4 | 0 | 0 | 178 | 26 | +152 |
| 6 | Philippines | 4 | 1 | 0 | 3 | 61 | 90 | -29 |
| 7 | Turkey | 4 | 3 | 0 | 1 | 133 | 77 | +56 |
| 8 | Vanuatu | 4 | 0 | 0 | 4 | 43 | 127 | -84 |
| 9 | Solomon Islands^{Plate Winners} | 4 | 3 | 0 | 1 | 154 | 78 | +76 |
| 10 | Japan | 4 | 1 | 0 | 3 | 60 | 192 | -132 |
| 11 | Hong Kong | 4 | 0 | 0 | 4 | 62 | 182 | -120 |
