= Steven Bernstrom =

Filipino rugby union player

Personal information
- Born: 7 April 1991 (age 34)
- Height: 1.88 m (6 ft 2 in)
- Weight: 100 kg (220 lb; 15 st 10 lb)

Playing information

Rugby league
- Position: Lock/Second Row
Representative
Years	Team	Pld	T	G	FG	P
2012–2018	Philippines	5	0	0	0	0

Rugby union
- Position: Number eight
Club
Years	Team	Pld	T	G	FG	P
2019	NTT Docomo Red Hurricanes	8				0
- Source: As of 24 October 2021

Steven Bernstrom (born 7 April 1991) is a Filipino professional rugby union footballer who played for NTT Docomo Red Hurricanes in the Japanese Top League. His regular position is Number 8. He has previously played rugby league for the Philippines national rugby league team at lock and second-row forward.

== Playing career ==
=== Rugby League ===
Bernstrom played rugby league for the Philippines national rugby league team.

=== Rugby Union ===
On 19 April 2019, Bernstrom was announced to be playing professional rugby union for the NTT Docomo Red Hurricanes in the Japan Top League.

On 7 August 2019, Bernstrom was announced to be departing the NTT Docomo Red Hurricanes.
