= Turkey national rugby league team =

Turkey

Team information
- Governing body: Turkish Rugby League Association
- Region: Europe
- Head coach: Scott Hartas
- Captain: Arda Dalcik
- Most caps: 11 players (4)
- Top try-scorers: Ali Bökeyhan Sürer (5); Arda Dalcik (5)
- Top point-scorer: Ali Bökeyhan Sürer (50)
- IRL ranking: 39th

Team results
- First international
- Solomon Islands 22–30 Turkey (Windsor, Australia; 1 October 2018)
- Biggest win
- Japan 0–60 Turkey (St Marys, Australia; 4 October 2018)
- Biggest defeat
- Australian Defence Force 46–0 Turkey (Sydney, Australia; 25 April 2021)
- World Cup
- Appearances: 0

The Turkey national rugby league team represents Turkey in international rugby league. The team played their first match in 2018.

== History ==
The Turkish Rugby League Association was founded in 2016, however the team didn't play their first match until two years later. The side made their competition debut at the 2018 Emerging Nations World Championship in Sydney, defeating the Solomon Islands 30–22 in their first ever match. The team also beat Japan 60–0, winning qualification for the tournament's trophy stage. Here, they lost to the Philippines 29–16 in the semi-final before beating Vanuatu 27–26, on the back of a field goal from Adem Baskonyali, claiming seventh place at their inaugural competition.

In 2019, the team played their first match in Turkey, losing to Greece 38–24 at the Aysekadin Yerleskesi Futbol Stadium in Istanbul. They also lost to Malta 28–12 six weeks later.

== Competitive record ==
=== Overall ===
Below is table of the official representative rugby league matches played by Turkey at test level up until 25 September 2022:

Opponent	Played	Won	Drawn	Lost	Win %	For	Aga	Diff
Bulgaria	1	1	0	0	100%	38	16	+22
Greece	1	0	0	1	0%	24	38	-14
Japan	1	1	0	0	100%	60	0	+60
Malta	2	1	0	1	50%	48	40	+8
Netherlands	1	0	0	1	0%	18	40	−22
Philippines	1	0	0	1	0%	16	29	−13
Solomon Islands	1	1	0	0	100%	30	22	+8
Vanuatu	1	1	0	0	100%	27	26	+1
Total	9	5	0	4	56%	261	211	+50

== Results ==
Date	Result (Note: Turkey score given first)	Opponent	Competition	Venue	Attendance	Ref.
1 October 2018	30–22	Solomon Islands	2018 Emerging Nations World Championship	Windsor Sporting Complex, Windsor, Sydney, Australia	750	
4 October 2018	60–0	Japan	2018 Emerging Nations World Championship	St. Marys Leagues Stadium, St. Marys, Sydney, Australia	500	
10 October 2018	16–29	Philippines	2018 Emerging Nations World Championship	New Era Stadium, Cabramatta, Sydney, Australia	450	
13 October 2018	27–26	Vanuatu	2018 Emerging Nations World Championship	St. Marys Leagues Stadium, St. Marys, Sydney, Australia	250	
14 September 2019	24–38	Greece	International	Aysekadin Yerleskesi Futbol Stadium, Istanbul, Turkey	250	
26 October 2019	12–28	Malta	International	New Era Stadium, Cabramatta, Sydney, Australia	600	
25 April 2021	0–46	Australian Defence Forces	Friendly	Sydney Cricket Ground, Moore Park, Sydney, Australia		
14 October 2021	18–40	Netherlands	2021 European Championship D	Huseyin Akar Tesisleri Stadium, Bodrum, Turkey	500	
17 October 2021	36–12	Malta	2021 European Championship D	Huseyin Akar Tesisleri Stadium, Bodrum, Turkey		
25 September 2022	38–16	Bulgaria	International	ITU Stadium, Istanbul, Turkey		

== IRL Rankings ==
IRL Men's World Rankings
Official rankings as of August 2026
Rank	Change	Team	Pts %
1	Steady	Australia	100
2	Steady	New Zealand	82
3	Steady	England	70
4	Steady	Samoa	56
5	Steady	Tonga	54
6	Steady	Papua New Guinea	47
7	Steady	Fiji	34
8	▲1	Cook Islands	24
9	▲2	Netherlands	23
10	▲2	Ukraine	21
11	▼3	France	21
12	▼2	Serbia	20
13	Steady	Wales	18
14	Steady	Ireland	17
15	Steady	Greece	14
16	Steady	Malta	14
17	▲12	Canada	13
18	▼1	Italy	11
19	▼1	Jamaica	9
20	▲7	Scotland	8
21	▲1	United States	8
22	▼3	Poland	7
23	▼3	Lebanon	7
24	▼1	Germany	7
25	▼1	Czech Republic	6
26	▼5	Norway	6
27	▼2	Chile	5
28	▲2	Philippines	5
29	▼1	South Africa	4
30	Steady	Brazil	3
31	Steady	Morocco	3
32	▲1	Argentina	3
33	▲2	Ghana	2
34	▲2	Kenya	2
35	▼1	Montenegro	2
36	▲1	Nigeria	2
37	▼5	North Macedonia	1
38	Steady	Albania	1
39	Steady	Turkey	1
40	Steady	Bulgaria	1
41	Steady	Cameroon	0
42	Steady	Japan	0
43	Steady	Spain	0
44	Steady	Colombia	0
45	Steady	Russia	0
46	Steady	El Salvador	0
47	Steady	Bosnia and Herzegovina	0
48	Steady	Hong Kong	0
49	Steady	Solomon Islands	0
50	Steady	Vanuatu	0
51	Steady	Hungary	0
52	Steady	Latvia	0
53	Steady	Denmark	0
54	Steady	Belgium	0
55	Steady	Estonia	0
56	Steady	Sweden	0
57	Steady	Niue	0
Complete rankings at www.internationalrugbyleague.com

== See also ==
- Rugby union in Turkey
- Turkey national rugby union team
- Turkey women's national rugby league team
- Turkey women's national rugby union team
