= Argentina national rugby league team =

Argentina
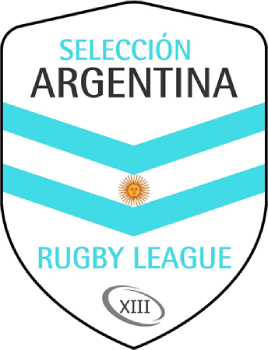

Team information
- Nickname: Jabalis (Wild boars)
- Governing body: Argentina Rugby League
- Region: Americas
- Head coach: Pablo Aguilera – Emiliano Rodríguez
- Captain: Juan Ignacio Cánepa
- IRL ranking: 32nd

Team results
- First international
- Argentina 4–40 Australian Police (Australia) (Buenos Aires, Argentina; 2005)
- Biggest win
- Argentina 36-6 Colombia (Los Ángeles, Chile; 17 November 2017)
- Biggest defeat
- Argentina 6–60 Australian Police (Australia) (Buenos Aires, Argentina; 2005)
- World Cup
- Appearances: 0

The Argentina national rugby league team (formerly nicknamed the Penguins but now the Jabalis) represent Argentina in the sport of rugby league football.

== History ==
Argentina first played rugby league in 2005 when the Australian Police Rugby League Association organised a tour to Buenos Aires. The Australian Police team played two games against Argentina. The first was a 40–4 win for the Australian Police, with a crowd of 87 people attending. The second game was a 60–6 win for the Australian Police with a crowd attendance of 71.

The sport then remained dormant in the country for over 10 years before being revived in 2016 amidst a number of other South and Central American nations taking up the sport. Argentina saw its first domestic activity for a decade in November 2016 when it hosted the Primer Torneo Sudamericano de Rugby League, a slightly modified 9-a-side tournament in Miramar involving the national teams of Argentina and Chile, as well as a number of select sides from around the region which were bolstered by the Latin Heat organization. The final of the event was between the Argentinian and Chilean national teams, with Argentina winning 16–0.

In 2017, with great effort from the players and coaching staff, Argentina traveled to Chile by bus, to be in the inaugural Latinoamericano Championship. This was the first time that a Latin American championship was played with 13 players a side, three referees and full RLIF tournament rules. This event gave Argentina their first chance to earn World Ranking points and debut in the International Rankings. Argentina's first match of the tournament was a 36–6 win over Colombia. This win earned a spot in the Final against Chile with Argentina losing 32–12 to a team sporting a number of heritage players from Australia. The Argentinian team for the tournament was wholly made up of players from development and social leagues and no heritage players.

2018 saw Argentina playing in the Confederação Brasileira de Rugby League Festival in São Paulo, beating Colombia 28–16 before losing to Brazil in the final by 22-20 despite leading 14–20 at one point.

In March 2024, Argentina was granted Observer Member status by the International Rugby League.

== Current squad ==
Squad selected for 2018 South American Rugby League Cup;

- Juan Ignacio Canepa
- Marcelo Villalba
- Emiliano Rodriguez
- Ares Martinez
- Ariel Cosso
- Facundo Lizarzuay
- Lucas Escobar
- Gaston Barrera
- Dario Moyano
- Ulises Silva
- Nahuel Lajmanovich
- Leandro Donato
- Sergio Espinola
- Dylan Moreira
- Juan Carlos Blumetti
- Ernesto Di Nucci
- Leandro Kwiczor
- Brian Avejera

== IRL Rankings ==
IRL Men's World Rankings
Official rankings as of August 2026
Rank	Change	Team	Pts %
1	Steady	Australia	100
2	Steady	New Zealand	82
3	Steady	England	70
4	Steady	Samoa	56
5	Steady	Tonga	54
6	Steady	Papua New Guinea	47
7	Steady	Fiji	34
8	▲1	Cook Islands	24
9	▲2	Netherlands	23
10	▲2	Ukraine	21
11	▼3	France	21
12	▼2	Serbia	20
13	Steady	Wales	18
14	Steady	Ireland	17
15	Steady	Greece	14
16	Steady	Malta	14
17	▲12	Canada	13
18	▼1	Italy	11
19	▼1	Jamaica	9
20	▲7	Scotland	8
21	▲1	United States	8
22	▼3	Poland	7
23	▼3	Lebanon	7
24	▼1	Germany	7
25	▼1	Czech Republic	6
26	▼5	Norway	6
27	▼2	Chile	5
28	▲2	Philippines	5
29	▼1	South Africa	4
30	Steady	Brazil	3
31	Steady	Morocco	3
32	▲1	Argentina	3
33	▲2	Ghana	2
34	▲2	Kenya	2
35	▼1	Montenegro	2
36	▲1	Nigeria	2
37	▼5	North Macedonia	1
38	Steady	Albania	1
39	Steady	Turkey	1
40	Steady	Bulgaria	1
41	Steady	Cameroon	0
42	Steady	Japan	0
43	Steady	Spain	0
44	Steady	Colombia	0
45	Steady	Russia	0
46	Steady	El Salvador	0
47	Steady	Bosnia and Herzegovina	0
48	Steady	Hong Kong	0
49	Steady	Solomon Islands	0
50	Steady	Vanuatu	0
51	Steady	Hungary	0
52	Steady	Latvia	0
53	Steady	Denmark	0
54	Steady	Belgium	0
55	Steady	Estonia	0
56	Steady	Sweden	0
57	Steady	Niue	0
Complete rankings at www.internationalrugbyleague.com

== See also ==
- Rugby league in Argentina
