= Vanuatu national rugby league team =

Vanuatu

Team information
- Governing body: Vanuatu Rugby League
- Region: Asia-Pacific
- Head coach: Lionel Harbin
- Captain: James Wood
- Home stadium: Port Vila Municipal Stadium
- IRL ranking: 50th

Team results
- First international
- Vanuatu 14–24 Greece (Port Vila, Vanuatu; 20 October 2012)
- Biggest win
- Vanuatu 48–30 Solomon Islands (Mackay, Australia; 7 October 2013)
- Biggest defeat
- Vanuatu 16–32 Philippines (Luganville, Vanuatu; 11 October 2014)
- World Cup
- Appearances: 0

The Vanuatu national rugby league team represents Vanuatu in international rugby league matches. The team was founded in 2011 and is administered by the Vanuatu Rugby League (VRL).

== History ==
The Vanuatu national team was founded in 2011 after Australian Dane Campbell began to promote rugby league in Vanuatu. Campbell was the inaugural head coach of the team. They played their first match in the Cabramatta International Nines on 4 February 2012. Joe Meninga, nephew of Mal Meninga, was selected in Vanuatu's squad for the tournament. The team were undefeated in reaching the final, where they lost to the Australian Aboriginal team.

Vanuatu played their first test match against Greece on 20 October 2012, which they lost 14-24. On 20 August 2013, David Simpson was announced as head coach, succeeding the inaugural head coach Dane Campbell.

Vanuatu finished in eighth place at the 2018 Emerging Nations World Championship.

== Competitive record ==
Below is a list Vanuatu national team record as of 23 December 2020.

=== Overall ===
Opponent	Played	Won	Drawn	Lost	Win %	For	Aga	Diff
Greece	2	0	0	2	0%	14	64	–50
Hungary	1	0	0	1	0%	13	18	–5
Niue	1	1	0	0	100%	22	20	+2
Philippines	1	0	0	1	0%	16	32	–16
Poland	1	0	0	1	0%	4	44	–40
Solomon Islands	3	3	0	0	100%	112	65	+47
Turkey	1	0	0	1	100%	26	27	–1
Total	10	4	0	6	40%	207	270	–63

== Results ==
Date	Opponent	Score	Venue	Attendance	Competition	Report
20 October 2012	Greece	14–24	Port Vila Municipal Stadium, Port Vila		Friendly	
7 October 2013	Solomon Islands	48–30	Stadium Mackay, Mackay	1,648	Friendly	
12 October 2013	Niue	22–20	Port Vila Municipal Stadium, Port Vila	3,022	Friendly	
11 October 2014	Philippines	16–32	Chapius Stadium, Luganville	2,021	Friendly	
16 October 2016	Solomon Islands	24–16	Port Vila Municipal Stadium, Port Vila	1,000	Friendly	
4 October 2018	Hungary	13–18	St Marys Leagues Stadium, Sydney	300	2018 Emerging Nations World Championship	
7 October 2018	Greece	0–38	Kellyville Ridge Stadium, Sydney	130	2018 Emerging Nations World Championship	
10 October 2018	Poland	4–44	New Era Stadium, Sydney	170	2018 Emerging Nations World Championship	
10 October 2018	Turkey	26–27	St Marys Leagues Stadium, Sydney		2018 Emerging Nations World Championship	
6 June 2026	Singapore	30–24	Port Vila Municipal Stadium, Port Vila	Unknown	Friendly	

== IRL Rankings ==
IRL Men's World Rankings
Official rankings as of August 2026
Rank	Change	Team	Pts %
1	Steady	Australia	100
2	Steady	New Zealand	82
3	Steady	England	70
4	Steady	Samoa	56
5	Steady	Tonga	54
6	Steady	Papua New Guinea	47
7	Steady	Fiji	34
8	▲1	Cook Islands	24
9	▲2	Netherlands	23
10	▲2	Ukraine	21
11	▼3	France	21
12	▼2	Serbia	20
13	Steady	Wales	18
14	Steady	Ireland	17
15	Steady	Greece	14
16	Steady	Malta	14
17	▲12	Canada	13
18	▼1	Italy	11
19	▼1	Jamaica	9
20	▲7	Scotland	8
21	▲1	United States	8
22	▼3	Poland	7
23	▼3	Lebanon	7
24	▼1	Germany	7
25	▼1	Czech Republic	6
26	▼5	Norway	6
27	▼2	Chile	5
28	▲2	Philippines	5
29	▼1	South Africa	4
30	Steady	Brazil	3
31	Steady	Morocco	3
32	▲1	Argentina	3
33	▲2	Ghana	2
34	▲2	Kenya	2
35	▼1	Montenegro	2
36	▲1	Nigeria	2
37	▼5	North Macedonia	1
38	Steady	Albania	1
39	Steady	Turkey	1
40	Steady	Bulgaria	1
41	Steady	Cameroon	0
42	Steady	Japan	0
43	Steady	Spain	0
44	Steady	Colombia	0
45	Steady	Russia	0
46	Steady	El Salvador	0
47	Steady	Bosnia and Herzegovina	0
48	Steady	Hong Kong	0
49	Steady	Solomon Islands	0
50	Steady	Vanuatu	0
51	Steady	Hungary	0
52	Steady	Latvia	0
53	Steady	Denmark	0
54	Steady	Belgium	0
55	Steady	Estonia	0
56	Steady	Sweden	0
57	Steady	Niue	0
Complete rankings at www.internationalrugbyleague.com
