= Paul Sheedy =

Australian former dual-code rugby footballer

- Born: Paul Sheedy; 16 February 1981 (age 45) Brisbane, Queensland
- Height: 1.74 m (5 ft 9 in)
- Weight: 85 kg (13 st 5 lb)
- School: Marist College Ashgrove

Rugby union career
- Position: Scrum-half
Amateur team(s)
Years	Team	Apps	(Points)
2002–05	Manly RUFC		
Super Rugby
Years	Team	Apps	(Points)
2001–04	Waratahs	8	(15)
International career
Years	Team	Apps	(Points)
1998–99	Australian Schoolboys	6	(0)
2002	Australia U-21		
- Rugby league career

Playing information
- Position: Halfback, Fullback
Club
Years	Team	Pld	T	G	FG	P
1999–01	Norths Devils
2001	Melbourne Storm	2				0
	Total	2	0	0	0	0
Representative
Years	Team	Pld	T	G	FG	P
2013–18	Philippines Tamaraws	5				9

Coaching information
Club
Years	Team	Gms	W	D	L	W%
2019	Philippines Tamaraws

Paul Sheedy (born 16 February 1981), is an Australian former professional rugby footballer. He played rugby league for the Melbourne Storm in 2001, and he played rugby union for the New South Wales Waratahs between 2001 and 2004.

== Early life ==
Sheedy attended secondary school at Marist College Ashgrove in Brisbane, where he played rugby for Ashgrove's 1st XV team in 1997 and 1998. He was selected for the Australian Schoolboys team in 1998 and played scrum-half in the grand slam-winning team that defeated Scotland, Ireland, Wales and England on their 1998–99 tour. He played junior rugby league with Wests Mitchelton.

== Career ==
=== Rugby league ===
In 1999, Sheedy switched codes to play rugby league in the Queensland Cup for the Northern Suburbs Devils (then affiliated with Melbourne Storm). He made his NRL debut for the Melbourne Storm against the Bulldogs in 2001, replacing the injured Robbie Ross at fullback. Following his debut, Sheedy admitted he had been petrified in the lead-up: "as it got closer I got more nervous, but it was fine once I was out there and got settled. I wasn't confident enough to get in and have a go some of the time. I wasn't sure what I should be doing in attack, but it was great experience and I've had a taste now."

=== Rugby union ===
Sheedy switched back to rugby union in the latter part of 2001, signing with the New South Wales Waratahs. Following his signing, Sheedy was hospitalised with a fractured skull after falling from his balcony, trying to enter his apartment.

In 2002, he was selected and played for the Australian team at the Under 21 Rugby World Championship held in Johannesburg.

He joined the Manly rugby club in Sydney, where he played in the Shute Shield competition between 2002 and 2005. Sheedy made his Super 12 debut off the bench for the Waratahs against the Auckland Blues in the opening round of the 2003 season. He returned to rugby league and played for South Perth Lions in the Western Australian Rugby League.
