= Pio Sokobalavu =

Fiji international rugby league footballer (born 1996)

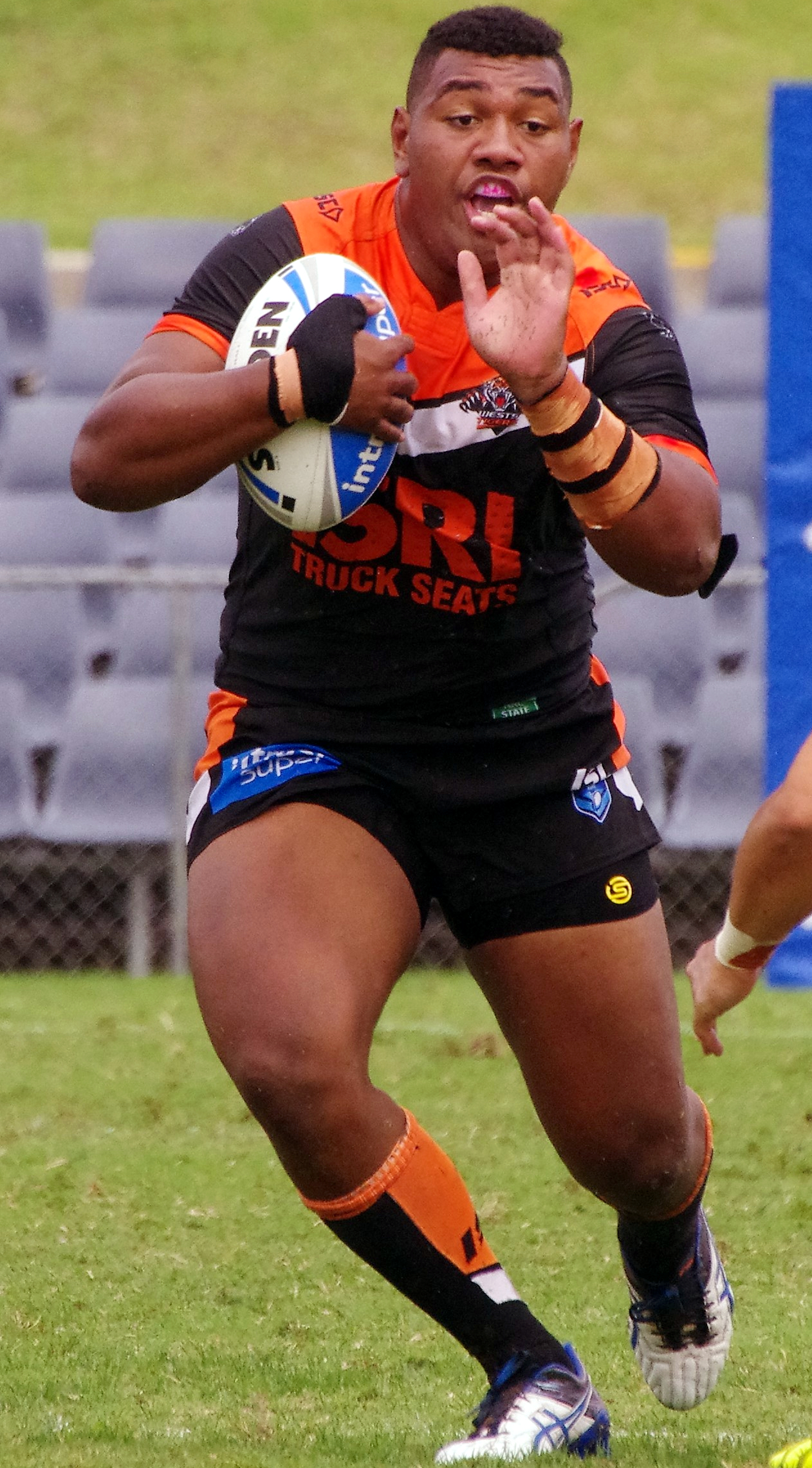

Personal information
- Born: 26 April 1996 (age 30) Totoya, Fiji
- Height: 185 cm (6 ft 1 in)
- Weight: 114 kg (17 st 13 lb)

Playing information
Representative
Years	Team	Pld	T	G	FG	P
2018	Fiji	1	0	0	0	0

Pio Sokobalavu is a Fijian rugby league footballer who plays for the St George Illawarra Dragons in the Intrust Super Premiership. He is a Fiji international.

== Playing career ==
From Totoya, Sokobalavu played in the 2016 Holden Cup for the Wests Tigers. In 2017 he played for the Wests Tigers in the New South Wales Cup.

Sokobalavu was not originally selected in the Fijian squad for the 2017 World Cup, but was called in as an injury replacement. He was a reserve for Fiji in their match against Italy.

In 2018, he was selected to play for Fiji against PNG.

In 2019 he joined the Western Suburbs Magpies.

In December 2020 he was named as part of the Fijian squad for the 2021 Rugby League World Cup.
