= Poland national rugby league team =

Polska Rugby League

Team information
- Nickname: Polska XIII
- Governing body: Polska Rugby XIII
- Region: Europe
- Captain: Australasia - Chippie Korostchuk
- Top try-scorer: Chippie Korostchuk 6 Tries
- Top point-scorer: Ethan Niszczot 60 points
- IRL ranking: 22nd

Team results
- First international
- Norway 76–0 Poland (Stavanger Stadion, Stavanger; 1 September 2018)
- Biggest win
- Poland 62-6 Hong Kong (St Mary's Stadium, Sydney; 4 October 2018)
- Biggest defeat
- Norway 76-0 Poland (Stavanger Stadion, Stavanger; 1 September 2018)

The Poland national rugby league team (Polska XIII) represent Poland in international rugby league football competitions throughout Europe and around the World. Polska XIII competed in the 2018 Emerging Nations World Championship in Sydney playing in the second tier tournament going through undefeated to win the Trophy defeating the Philippines 14–10 in the final. As of December 2025 it is ranked 19th in IRL Men's World Rankings.

== Competitive record ==
=== Overall ===
Below is table of the official representative rugby league matches played by Poland at test level as of 7 January 2025.

Opponent	Played	Won	Drawn	Lost	Win %	PF	PA	Diff
Czech Republic	3	1	0	2	33%	86	88	-2
Norway	3	1	0	2	33%	22	162	-140
Germany	2	0	0	2	0%	28	112	-84
Hong Kong	1	1	0	0	100%	62	6	+56
Japan	1	1	0	0	100%	58	6	+52
Vanuatu	1	1	0	0	100%	44	4	+40
Hungary	1	1	0	0	100%	32	0	+32
North Macedonia	1	1	0	0	100%	40	8	+32
Philippines	1	1	0	0	100%	14	10	+4
Sweden	1	0	0	1	0%	16	50	-34
Total	15	8	0	7	53%	402	446	-44

== Results ==
Date	Opponent	Score	Tournament	Venue	Reports
1 Sep 2018	Norway	0–76	—	Stavanger Stadion, Stavanger	ERL
4 Oct 2018	Hong Kong	62–6	2018 ENWC	St Marys, Sydney	ENWC
7 Oct 2018	Japan	58–6	2018 ENWC	Kellyville, Sydney	ENWC
10 Oct 2018	Vanuatu	44–4	2018 ENWC	Cabramatta, Sydney	ENWC
13 Oct 2018	Philippines	14–10	2018 ENWC	St Marys, Sydney	ENWC
28 Sep 2019	Czech Republic	34–18	—	Stadion Budowlani, Łódź	IRL
12 Oct 2019	Sweden	16–50	—	Stadion Budowlani, Łódź	IRL
19 Oct 2019	Norway	0–68	—	Stadion Budowlani, Łódź	IRL
29 Oct 2020	Slovakia	22–18	—	Bratislava	
12 Nov 2022	Norway	22–18	—	Ilford Rugby Club, London	ERL
22 Nov 2022	South Africa	16–38	Warsaw Airlift Cup	Southport Tigers, Queensland	ERL
16 Sep 2023	Czech Republic	28–36	—	Majkowski Wembley, Kalisz	ERL
21 Oct 2023	North Macedonia	40–8	—	Forshaw Rugby Park, Sydney	ERL
4 Nov 2023	Germany	10–54	Oder Cup	Berlin	ERL
21 Sep 2024	Germany	18–58	"Augustus The Strong" Trophy	Nowe Skalmierzyce	ERL
19 Oct 2024	Czech Republic	24–34	—	Stadion Romana Sebrleho, Lanskroune	ERL

== IRL Rankings ==
IRL Men's World Rankings
Official rankings as of August 2026
Rank	Change	Team	Pts %
1	Steady	Australia	100
2	Steady	New Zealand	82
3	Steady	England	70
4	Steady	Samoa	56
5	Steady	Tonga	54
6	Steady	Papua New Guinea	47
7	Steady	Fiji	34
8	▲1	Cook Islands	24
9	▲2	Netherlands	23
10	▲2	Ukraine	21
11	▼3	France	21
12	▼2	Serbia	20
13	Steady	Wales	18
14	Steady	Ireland	17
15	Steady	Greece	14
16	Steady	Malta	14
17	▲12	Canada	13
18	▼1	Italy	11
19	▼1	Jamaica	9
20	▲7	Scotland	8
21	▲1	United States	8
22	▼3	Poland	7
23	▼3	Lebanon	7
24	▼1	Germany	7
25	▼1	Czech Republic	6
26	▼5	Norway	6
27	▼2	Chile	5
28	▲2	Philippines	5
29	▼1	South Africa	4
30	Steady	Brazil	3
31	Steady	Morocco	3
32	▲1	Argentina	3
33	▲2	Ghana	2
34	▲2	Kenya	2
35	▼1	Montenegro	2
36	▲1	Nigeria	2
37	▼5	North Macedonia	1
38	Steady	Albania	1
39	Steady	Turkey	1
40	Steady	Bulgaria	1
41	Steady	Cameroon	0
42	Steady	Japan	0
43	Steady	Spain	0
44	Steady	Colombia	0
45	Steady	Russia	0
46	Steady	El Salvador	0
47	Steady	Bosnia and Herzegovina	0
48	Steady	Hong Kong	0
49	Steady	Solomon Islands	0
50	Steady	Vanuatu	0
51	Steady	Hungary	0
52	Steady	Latvia	0
53	Steady	Denmark	0
54	Steady	Belgium	0
55	Steady	Estonia	0
56	Steady	Sweden	0
57	Steady	Niue	0
Complete rankings at www.internationalrugbyleague.com
