= Hong Kong national rugby league team =

Hong Kong

Team information
- Nickname: Thunder
- Governing body: Hong Kong Rugby League
- Region: Asia Pacific
- Head coach: Matthew Jones
- Captain: Jason Chung Kan Yip
- Most caps: Toby Lei (8)
- Top try-scorer: Ben Ryan (5)
- Top point-scorer: Richard Lindsay (30)
- IRL ranking: 48th

Uniforms
First colours

Team results
- First international
- Hong Kong 22–24 Japan (Kowloon, Hong Kong; 4 November 2017)
- Biggest win
- Philippines 20–34 Hong Kong (Pasig, Philippines; 1 December 2024)
- Biggest defeat
- Hong Kong 6–62 Poland (St Mary's Stadium, Australia; 4 October 2018)
- World Cup
- Appearances: 0

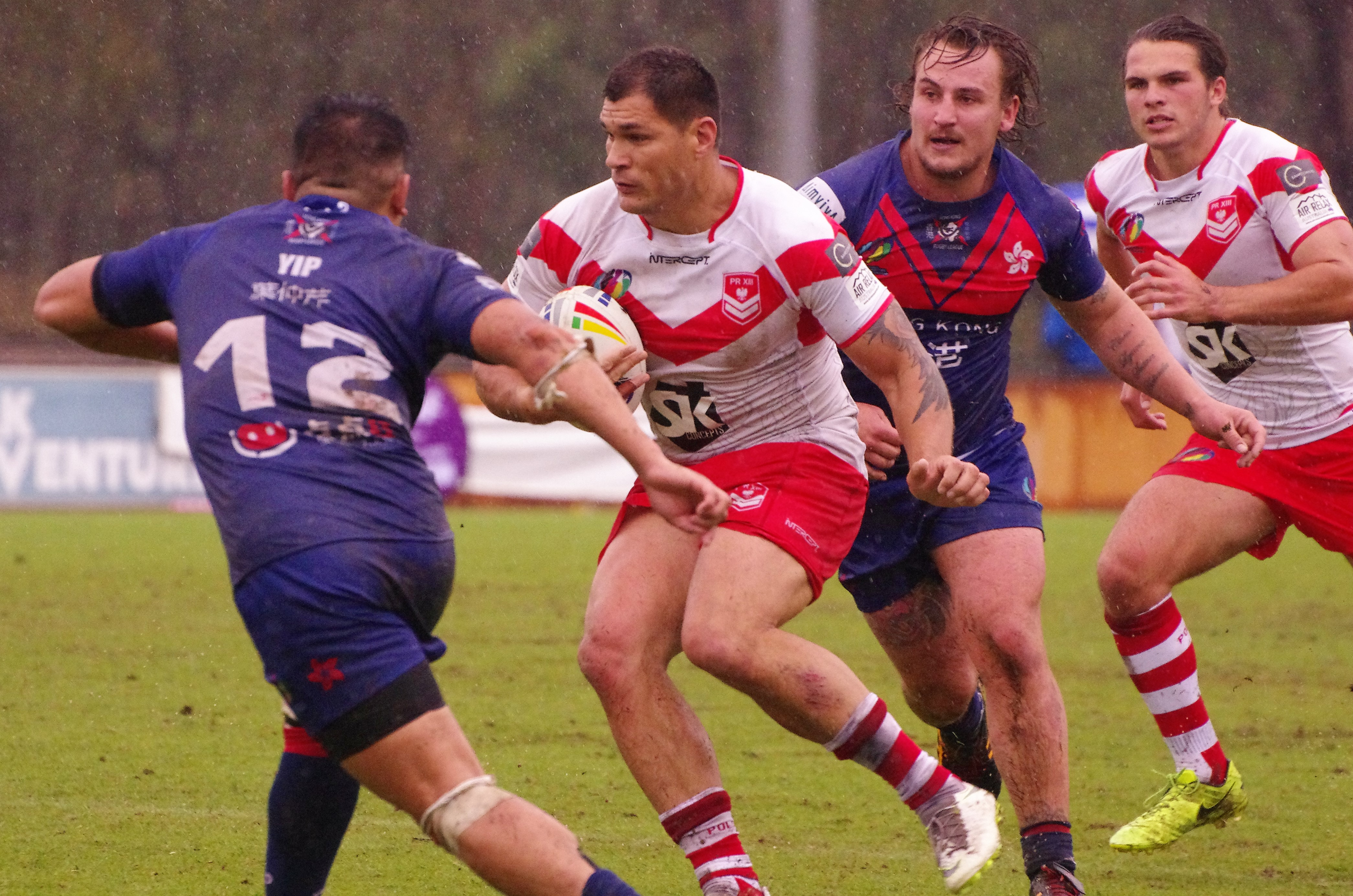
Hong Kong playing Poland in 2018

The Hong Kong national rugby league team represents Hong Kong in the sport of rugby league.

Hong Kong is ranked 48th in the world, as of July 2025.

== History ==
The Hong Kong Rugby League (HKRL) was formed in December 2014, with the first official rugby league matches in Hong Kong being played in 2015 and the inaugural Hong Kong Super League being contested in 2017.

Hong Kong made its Test debut in November 2017, losing to Japan in Kowloon. Hong Kong plays Japan for a trophy called the East Asia Cup.

Ben Ryan scored the first try for Hong Kong during their debut international against Japan.

Hong Kong was included in the RLIF world rankings for the first time in December 2017.

The COVID-19 pandemic distrupted the conduct of rugby league in Hong Kong. The national team returned for the 2024 East Asia Cup after six years of hiatus.

== Current squad ==
Squad selected for 2024 East Asia Cup

- Andrew Welling
- Au Chi Wai
- Blake Atherton
- Callum Man
- Conan Freeman
- Dan Chui
- Gus Spence
- Doug O’Donnell
- Jason Yip
- Kenta Brown
- Matthew Jones
- Nelson Chan
- Tommy Lee
- Toby Lei
- Tommy Wong
- Hogan Toomalatai

== IRL Rankings ==
IRL Men's World Rankings
Official rankings as of December 2025
Rank	Change	Team	Pts %
1	Steady	Australia	100
2	Steady	New Zealand	82
3	Steady	England	74
4	Steady	Samoa	56
5	Steady	Tonga	54
6	Steady	Papua New Guinea	47
7	Steady	Fiji	34
8	Steady	France	24
9	Steady	Cook Islands	24
10	Steady	Serbia	23
11	Steady	Netherlands	22
12	Steady	Ukraine	21
13	Steady	Wales	18
14	Steady	Ireland	17
15	Steady	Greece	15
16	Steady	Malta	15
17	Steady	Italy	11
18	Steady	Jamaica	9
19	▲1	Poland	7
20	▲1	Lebanon	7
21	▲1	Norway	7
22	▼3	United States	7
23	Steady	Germany	7
24	Steady	Czech Republic	6
25	Steady	Chile	6
26	▲1	Philippines	5
27	▲1	Scotland	5
28	▼2	South Africa	5
29	▲1	Canada	5
30	▼1	Brazil	3
31	▲1	Morocco	3
32	▲1	North Macedonia	3
33	▲1	Argentina	3
34	▲1	Montenegro	3
35	▲4	Ghana	2
36	▼5	Kenya	2
37	▲3	Nigeria	2
38	▼2	Albania	1
39	▼2	Turkey	1
40	▼2	Bulgaria	1
41	▲1	Cameroon	0
42	▲1	Japan	0
43	▲1	Spain	0
44	▼3	Colombia	0
45	Steady	Russia	0
46	Steady	El Salvador	0
47	Steady	Bosnia and Herzegovina	0
48	Steady	Hong Kong	0
49	Steady	Solomon Islands	0
50	Steady	Vanuatu	0
51	Steady	Hungary	0
52	Steady	Latvia	0
53	Steady	Denmark	0
54	Steady	Belgium	0
55	Steady	Estonia	0
56	Steady	Sweden	0
57	Steady	Niue	0
Complete rankings at www.internationalrugbyleague.com
