= Japan national rugby league team =

International rugby league team

Japan

Team information
- Nickname: Samurais
- Governing body: Japanese Rugby League Association
- Region: Asia-Pacific
- Head coach: Willie Lux
- Captain: Travis Drury
- IRL ranking: 42nd

Uniforms
First colours

Team results
- First international
- Lebanon 52–28 Japan (Tokyo, Japan; 1998)
- Biggest win
- Japan 74–4 Philippines (9 November 2019)
- Biggest defeat
- Malta 82–0 Japan (Coffs Harbour, Australia; 25 January 2007)
- World Cup
- Appearances: 0

The Japan national rugby league team, nicknamed the Samurais, represents Japan in rugby league football. Japan have played some international competition since 1994. The Japanese National Cup, the JRL domestic club competition, was founded in 1998. Currently, two teams compete for the National Cup, the Black Bunnies and Edo Cranes. Several teams in recent years have also participated, including Tokyo 13 Warriors, South Ikebukuro Rabbitohs, Spartans, Abiko Ducks, Kansai Kaminari and Kamisenryu.

== History ==
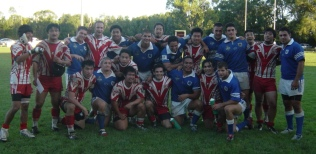
The Japanese national rugby league team after a match

Rugby league was founded in Japan in 1993 by former Australian first grade player, Max Mannix, who had played for the Canterbury-Bankstown Bulldogs and the Illawarra Steelers in Australia. While living in Japan, Mannix contacted the Australian Rugby League and requested entry into the 1994 Rugby League World Sevens, which was then played in Sydney as a precursor to the Australian professional rugby league competition, then known as the Winfield Cup. Mannix was given an interim period to prove that a competitive Japanese team could be formed, and over a period of 5 months, he made direct contact with rugby union players and invited them to play rugby league. With the support of his brother, Greg, and Masayuki Watabe, player numbers slowly climbed and regular weekly training sessions took place on the banks of the Tama River, located on the outskirts of Tokyo. In September 1993, Japan received an official invitation to participate in the 1994 World Sevens, an event that would provide the country with its first taste of rugby league competition; made up entirely of Japanese nationals derived from the Japanese rugby union teams, the Japan Rugby Football Union threatened the players with bans, but despite the threats, a Japanese team participated in the 1994 Rugby League World Sevens, playing games against Tonga, Great Britain, and Russia. Although the Japanese lost all 3 games, they proved to be a crowd favorite, and were invited to return to the event in 1995. The first 13-a-side rugby league team to represent Japan was the national university team that took part in the 1996 University World Cup. The team was coached by Max Mannix with former Canterbury Bulldogs and Halifax player, Ken Isaacs, overseeing team management. Staged in Warrington, England, the event saw Japan compete against national university teams from Scotland, England, France, and the United States.

The following year, 1997, saw Japan compete in the University World Cup in France, with Ken Isaacs coaching the team, and Shoji Watanabe overseeing team management. The first Japanese player to be contracted to a professional rugby league club was Kenji Imanaga. Imanaga was given a scholarship by the Canterbury Bankstown Bulldogs, and was joined soon after by Ryoichi Ojima, a talented fleet-footed centre. With the support of (then) club supremo, Peter Bullfrog Moore, Imanaga and Ojima played regular games for Moorebank, Canterbury's feeder club, then coached by Kevin Moore.

The first international game that Japan won was at the 1995 Rugby League World Sevens in Brisbane, when they defeated Canada, but Japan was disqualified for fielding what was deemed to be an unregistered player, a claim that was contested by the Japanese officials who offered proof that their application to register the player was declined solely on the grounds of race. The protest was declined and the disqualification held. The first international 13-a-side rugby league test match won by Japan was in 1999 at the 2000 World Cup qualifying tournament which was held at Disney's Wide World of Sports Complex in Florida, USA, where Japan defeated Canada 14–0. Despite the victory, Japan failed to qualify for the World Cup, having been previously defeated by the United States.

In 2000, Japan went on to play in the Emerging Nations tournament, an event designed to provide emerging nations with evenly matched competition, the tournament ran in parallel with the Rugby League World Cup. The Japanese team at the Emerging Nations World Cup was coached by Tony Smith, who went on to become a successful coach in England, culminating with his appointment to coach the English national team in 2008 through 2009. The first rugby league team to visit, and play, against Japan, was a New South Wales Group 20 representative team in 1997, followed by the Lebanese national rugby league team in 1998.

Distance from any other rugby league competitions, and problems with player availability due to short Japanese holidays, have made regular competition for the Samurais difficult. However, Japan is currently in discussion with the newly formed Thailand and Philippines Rugby Leagues to enter the Asian Cup for 2014, after having to pull out in 2013.

== Jersey ==
Primary; 1998–present	Alternative; 2006–present

== Current squad ==
Squad selected for the 2026 International match against Philippines in Manila on November 22nd 2026

- Taishi Kimura-Davies
- Adrien Le Conte
- Alistair Carless
- Daiki Ishiguro
- Darcy Heaney
- Geo Louw
- Kazan Watanabe
- Kazuki Otake
- Kenta Karino
- Kosei Tanaka
- Kosuke Isotani
- Mark Huata
- Reece Horii
- Reo Ozawa
- Sammy Hooper
- Shoji Yoshita
- Takeyoshi Nitta
- Terry Niimi-Moshides
- Yasutake Furuta

== Competitive record ==
=== Overall ===
Team	First Played	Played	Win	Draw	Loss	Points For	Points Against	Last Meeting
Canada	1999	2	1	0	1	26	28	2000
El Salvador	2022	1	1	0	0	26	24	2022
Greece	2016	1	0	0	1	0	72	2016
Hong Kong	2017	5	4	0	1	134	128	2025
Lebanon	1998	1	0	0	1	28	52	1998
Morocco	2000	1	0	0	1	8	12	2000
Malta	2007	1	0	0	1	0	82	2007
Niue	2025	1	0	0	1	8	58	2025
Philippines	2019	1	1	0	0	74	4	2019
Poland	2018	1	0	0	1	6	58	2018
Portugal	2013	1	0	0	1	20	26	2013
Singapore	2025	1	0	0	1	4	48	2025
Solomon Islands	2018	1	0	0	1	22	44	2018
Thailand	2014	4	1	0	3	68	138	2024
Turkey	2018	1	0	0	1	0	60	2018
United States	1999	5	0	0	5	46	256	2006
TOTAL		28	8	0	20	470	1090	

*Updated as of 1 December 2025

=== Competitions ===
Japan has participated in a number of competitions:

- World Sevens (1994, 1995, 1996, 1997, plus the qualification tournament in 2003, 2004)
- Super League World Nines (1996, 1997)
- Emerging Nations Tournament (2000)
- NSWRL International Nines (2004–2013)

In 2002 and 2003, Japan contested the East-West Challenge in the United States of America. In 2003, a North Pacific Club Challenge was held between the Champion Clubs of each country, with the Kagoshima Broncos defeating the New York Knights. Both competitions have since been disbanded.

=== Results ===
==== International ====
- Japan vs Philippines (22 November 2026)
- Japan def. Hong Kong 34-30 (29 November 2025)
- Singapore def. Japan 48-4 (27 November 2025)
- Niue def. Japan 58-8 (19 October 2025)
- Japan def. Hong Kong 24-14 (13 October 2024)
- Thailand def. Japan 46–0 (24 February 2024)
- Japan def. El Salvador 26-24 (9 October 2022)
- Japan def. Philippines 74–4 (9 November 2019)
- Japan def. Hong Kong 32–30 (11 October 2018)
- Solomon Islands def. Japan 44–22 (9 October 2018)
- Poland def. Japan 58–6 (7 October 2018)
- Turkey def. Japan 60–0 (4 October 2018)
- Hong Kong def. Japan 32–20 (16 June 2018)
- Japan def. Hong Kong 24–22 (4 November 2017)
- Greece def. Japan 72–0 (8 October 2016)
- Thailand def. Japan 30–6 (15 October 2015)
- Japan def. Thailand 52–16 (29 April 2015)
- Thailand def. Japan 46–10 (30 January 2014)
- Portugal def. Japan 26–20 (31 January 2013)
- Portugal RL def. Japan 28–16 (6 February 2008) as 10s match
- Malta def. Japan 82–0 (25 January 2007)
- USA def. Japan 58–18 (28 October 2006)
- USA def. Japan 40–10 (26 January 2006)
- USA def. Japan 78–6 (27 June 2003)
- USA def. Japan 26–12 (1 June 2002)
- Canada def. Japan 28–12 (20 November 2000)
- Morocco def. Japan 12–8 (15 November 2000)
- BARLA (Great Britain Amateurs) 54 Japan 0 (2000)
- USA def. Japan 54–0 (1999)
- Japan def. Canada 14–0 (1999)
- Lebanon def. Japan 52–28 (1998)

==== World Sevens results ====
- NASCA Aboriginals def. Japan 36–0 (24 January 2003)
- USA Tomahawks def. Japan 28–4 (24 January 2003)
- USA Tomahawks def. Japan 20–8 (1996)

==== International Nines results ====
- 2008 Bowl Finalists Newtown 36 def. Japan 4

Semi-final, Japan 22 Def. Portugal 6

==== Student results ====
- USA def. Japan 54–10 (1996)

== IRL Rankings ==
IRL Men's World Rankings
Official rankings as of August 2026
Rank	Change	Team	Pts %
1	Steady	Australia	100
2	Steady	New Zealand	82
3	Steady	England	70
4	Steady	Samoa	56
5	Steady	Tonga	54
6	Steady	Papua New Guinea	47
7	Steady	Fiji	34
8	▲1	Cook Islands	24
9	▲2	Netherlands	23
10	▲2	Ukraine	21
11	▼3	France	21
12	▼2	Serbia	20
13	Steady	Wales	18
14	Steady	Ireland	17
15	Steady	Greece	14
16	Steady	Malta	14
17	▲12	Canada	13
18	▼1	Italy	11
19	▼1	Jamaica	9
20	▲7	Scotland	8
21	▲1	United States	8
22	▼3	Poland	7
23	▼3	Lebanon	7
24	▼1	Germany	7
25	▼1	Czech Republic	6
26	▼5	Norway	6
27	▼2	Chile	5
28	▲2	Philippines	5
29	▼1	South Africa	4
30	Steady	Brazil	3
31	Steady	Morocco	3
32	▲1	Argentina	3
33	▲2	Ghana	2
34	▲2	Kenya	2
35	▼1	Montenegro	2
36	▲1	Nigeria	2
37	▼5	North Macedonia	1
38	Steady	Albania	1
39	Steady	Turkey	1
40	Steady	Bulgaria	1
41	Steady	Cameroon	0
42	Steady	Japan	0
43	Steady	Spain	0
44	Steady	Colombia	0
45	Steady	Russia	0
46	Steady	El Salvador	0
47	Steady	Bosnia and Herzegovina	0
48	Steady	Hong Kong	0
49	Steady	Solomon Islands	0
50	Steady	Vanuatu	0
51	Steady	Hungary	0
52	Steady	Latvia	0
53	Steady	Denmark	0
54	Steady	Belgium	0
55	Steady	Estonia	0
56	Steady	Sweden	0
57	Steady	Niue	0
Complete rankings at www.internationalrugbyleague.com
