= Philippines national rugby league team =

Philippines

Team information
- Nickname: Tamaraws
- Governing body: Pambansang Ragbi Liga Ng Pilipinas
- Region: Asia-Pacific
- Head coach: Paul Sheedy
- Captain: Isaac Rosario
- Most caps: Ned Stephenson
- IRL ranking: 28th

Uniforms
First colours

Team results
- First international
- Thailand 0–86 Philippines (Bangkok, Thailand; October 21, 2012)
- Biggest win
- Thailand 0–86 Philippines (Bangkok, Thailand; October 21, 2012)
- Biggest defeat
- South Africa 72–14 Philippines (Tugun, Australia; July 22, 2023)

The Philippines national rugby league team (nicknamed the Tamaraws) represent the Philippines in international rugby league football matches. They were established in 2011. In their short history the Tamaraws have been relatively successful, being repeated Asian Cup winners and regularly participating in the Cabramatta International 9s rugby league tournament.

== History ==
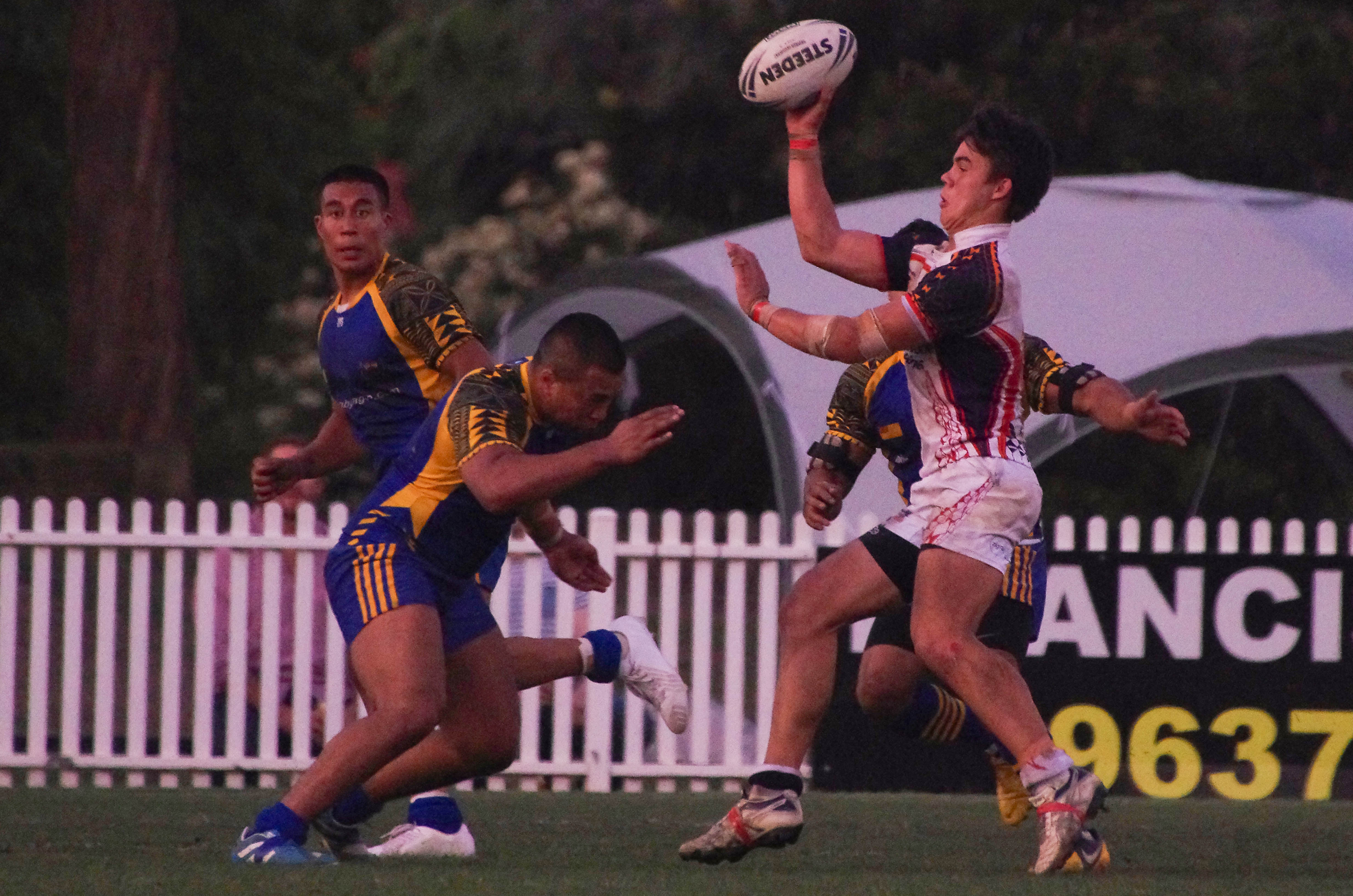
Niue v. Philippines in a test match in Sydney, Australia.

The Philippines National Rugby League (PNRL) was established in 2011 with a view of expanding rugby league further into Asia. The PNRL oversees the running of the national team, in 2011 it was announced that the Philippines would be playing their first game of rugby league at the 2012 at the Cabramatta International Nines, while also being involved in other organized international rugby league tournaments in the Asia-Pacific region.

The Philippines have twice been involved in the Cabramatta International 9s rugby league tournament, in 2012 they defeated Burwood-North Ryde 22-18 to take the Bowl Trophy. In 2013 they selected 3 teams to take part in the tournament. and in 2014 four teams: the first side, two development sides, and an under 20s side.

In 2012 the Philippines won over Thailand at the 2012 Rugby League Asian Cup.

They entered the Emerging Nations World Championship in 2018 participating in the third edition of the tournament hosted in Australia. Arwin Marcus was named head coach for the tournament.

== Coaches ==
- (New Zealand) Clayton Watene (2012–2014)
- (Philippines) Arwin Marcus (2016–2021)
- (Philippines) Paul Sheedy

== Current squad ==
Squad Selected for the 2025 Asian Championships

1. Isaac Rosario (c)
2. Lito Ramirez
3. Jonel Madrona
4. Johnsen Lalongisip
5. Juliann Viktor Feleo
6. Jay R Ramirez
7. Joe Mari Rauras
8. Larcel Caparros
9. Nik Forrest
10. Jordan Abanico
11. Joshua Pilic
12. John Denmer Usman
13. Henry Larriestan
14. James Osias
15. Manuel Olondriz
16. Romario Capule
17. Miguel Velis
18. Paul Sheedy
19. Dylan Jones
20. Judd Greenhalgh
21. Juan Carlos Almonte

== Competitive record ==
=== World Cup ===
World Cup record
Year	Round	Position	GP	W	L	D
(England) (Wales) 2013	Team did not exist when qualifying began					
(Australia) (Papua New Guinea) (New Zealand) 2017	Did not enter					
(England) 2021	Did not enter					
Total	0 Titles	0/13	0	0	0	0

=== Emerging Nations World Championship ===
Year	Round	Position	GP	W	L	D
(Australia) 2018	6th Place	6/11	4	1	3	0
Total	0 Titles	0/13	0	0	0	0

=== Asian Championship ===
Asian Championship record
Year	Round	Position	GP	W	L	D
(Philippines) 2025	To bedetermined					
Total	0 Title	0/1	0	0	0	0

=== Asian Cup ===
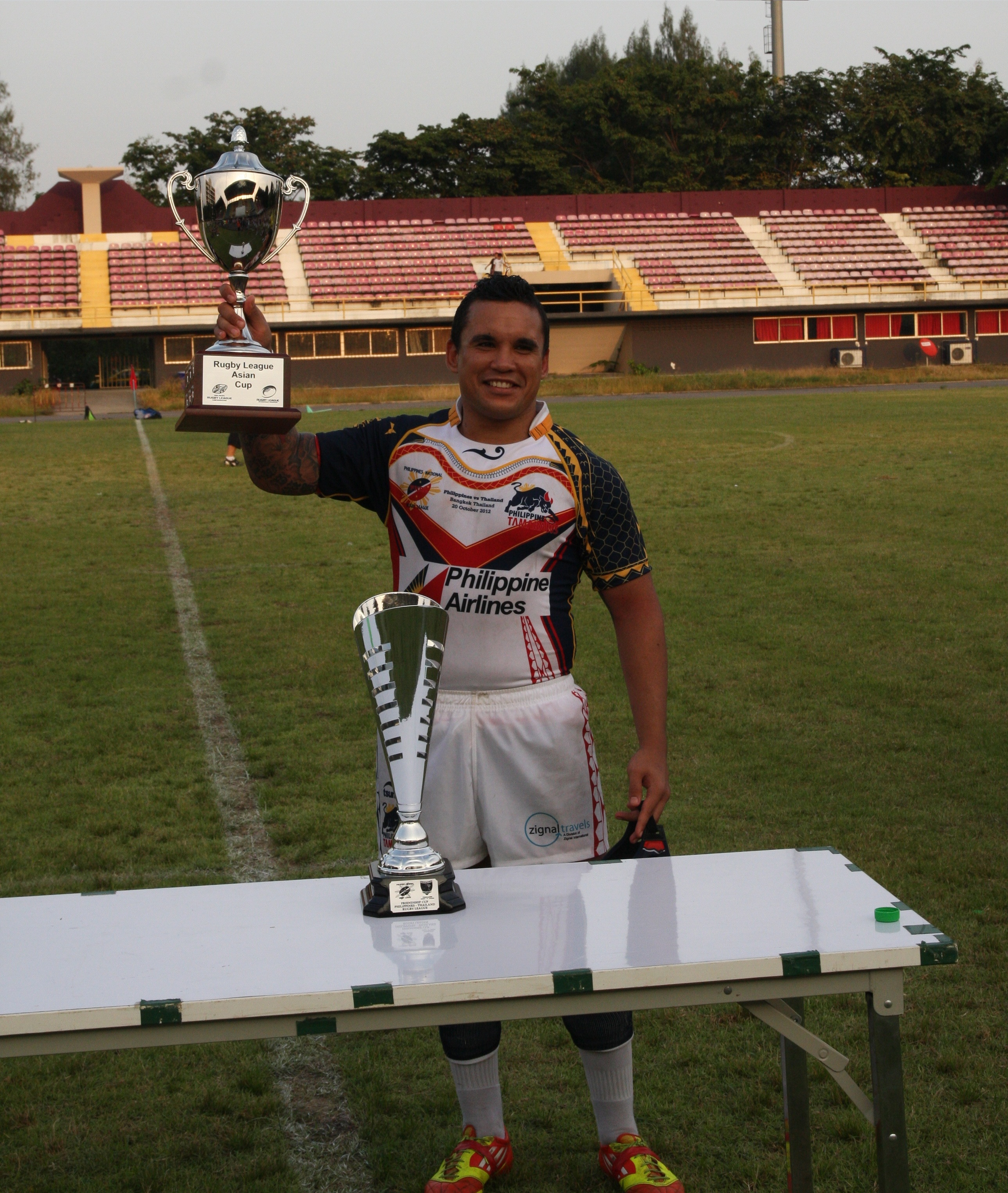
Captain of the winning Philippines team, Luke Srama holding the trophy at the inaugural Asian Cup in 2012.

The Philippines made their international rugby league debut in Bangkok on October 21, 2012, with a match against Thailand, who were also making their international debut. Aided by a host of Australian-based players, Philippines won the match 86-0 in the first Rugby League Asian Cup.

Asian Cup record
Year	Round	Position	GP	W	L	D
(Thailand) 2012	Champions	1/2	1	1	0	0
(Philippines) 2013	Champions	1/2	1	1	0	0
Total	2 Titles	1/1	1	1	0	0

== Fixtures and results ==
- Philippines def. Thailand 86–0 (October 21, 2012)
- Philippines def. Thailand 44–10 (October 21, 2013)
- Niue def. Philippines 36–22 (October 4, 2014)
- Philippines def. Vanuatu 32–16 (October 11, 2014)
- Philippines def. Serbia 18–12 (February 5, 2016)
- Malta def. Philippines 44–26 (February 4, 2017)
- Philippines def. Hungary 72–0 (November 5, 2017)
- Philippines def. Thailand 64–2 (November 8, 2017)
- Hungary def. Philippines 30–12 (February 3, 2018)
- Malta def. Philippines 36–10 (October 1, 2018)
- Niue def. Philippines 24–12 (October 7, 2018)
- Philippines def. Turkey 29–16 (October 10, 2018)
- Hong Kong def. Philippines 34–20 (December 1, 2024)

== All-time results record ==
Team	First Played	Played	Win	Draw	Loss	Points For	Points Against	Last Meeting
Chile	2022	1	0	0	1	20	36	2022
Hungary	2017	2	1	0	1	84	30	2018
Malta	2017	5	2	0	3	36	80	2024
Niue	2014	2	0	0	2	34	60	2018
Serbia	2016	1	1	0	0	18	12	2016
Thailand	2012	3	3	0	0	192	12	2017
Turkey	2018	1	1	0	0	29	16	2018
Vanuatu	2014	1	1	0	0	32	16	2014
Total	2012	13	7	0	5	445	262	

== IRL Rankings ==
IRL Men's World Rankings
Official rankings as of August 2026
Rank	Change	Team	Pts %
1	Steady	Australia	100
2	Steady	New Zealand	82
3	Steady	England	70
4	Steady	Samoa	56
5	Steady	Tonga	54
6	Steady	Papua New Guinea	47
7	Steady	Fiji	34
8	▲1	Cook Islands	24
9	▲2	Netherlands	23
10	▲2	Ukraine	21
11	▼3	France	21
12	▼2	Serbia	20
13	Steady	Wales	18
14	Steady	Ireland	17
15	Steady	Greece	14
16	Steady	Malta	14
17	▲12	Canada	13
18	▼1	Italy	11
19	▼1	Jamaica	9
20	▲7	Scotland	8
21	▲1	United States	8
22	▼3	Poland	7
23	▼3	Lebanon	7
24	▼1	Germany	7
25	▼1	Czech Republic	6
26	▼5	Norway	6
27	▼2	Chile	5
28	▲2	Philippines	5
29	▼1	South Africa	4
30	Steady	Brazil	3
31	Steady	Morocco	3
32	▲1	Argentina	3
33	▲2	Ghana	2
34	▲2	Kenya	2
35	▼1	Montenegro	2
36	▲1	Nigeria	2
37	▼5	North Macedonia	1
38	Steady	Albania	1
39	Steady	Turkey	1
40	Steady	Bulgaria	1
41	Steady	Cameroon	0
42	Steady	Japan	0
43	Steady	Spain	0
44	Steady	Colombia	0
45	Steady	Russia	0
46	Steady	El Salvador	0
47	Steady	Bosnia and Herzegovina	0
48	Steady	Hong Kong	0
49	Steady	Solomon Islands	0
50	Steady	Vanuatu	0
51	Steady	Hungary	0
52	Steady	Latvia	0
53	Steady	Denmark	0
54	Steady	Belgium	0
55	Steady	Estonia	0
56	Steady	Sweden	0
57	Steady	Niue	0
Complete rankings at www.internationalrugbyleague.com

== See also ==
- Philippine Tamaraw Rugby League
