= 2022 MEA Rugby League Championship =

2022 Middle-East Africa Championship
- Number of teams: 4
- Host country: Ghana
- Winner: Nigeria (2nd title)
- Matches played: 4

The 2022 Middle East-Africa Rugby League Championship was the third MEA Rugby League Championship, following the 2015 and 2019 tournaments, and the cancelled 2020 edition.

The competition was held between 27 September to 2 October 2022 in Ghana. Originally, the competition was going to see the return of the same four teams from the 2019 tournament; Nigeria, Morocco, Cameroon and hosts Ghana. On 23 August 2022, Kenya were named to replace Morocco in the tournament when Morocco were forced to withdraw from the tournament due to governance issues. The winners of the tournament were intended join the next phase of qualification for the 2025 Rugby League World Cup, however the 2025 World Cup ended up being cancelled.

== Participants ==
Team	Coach	Previous Apps	Previous best result	World Ranking (Note: IRL World Rankings are as of July 2022.)
Cameroon	(England) Kahlil Njoya	1	First round (2019)	36
Ghana	(England) Andy Gilvary	1	First round (2019)	31
Nigeria	(England) Bolu Fagborun	1	Champions (2019)	28
Kenya	(Kenya) John Mbai	0	Debut	N/A

== Squads ==
On 14 September 2022, each competing nation announced their squads for the tournament.

=== Cameroon ===
Jean Claude Bidjana, Armel Damdja, Cyrille Kamole, Nzokou Martial, Hermand Nguele, Patrick Nkouak, Lamare Oudi (Bulls RL), Emmanuel Tientchue (Gorilla RL), Mouhamed Embella, Christian Tedjou, Loic Tsasse (Guepard RL), Philippe Ambassa, Bekolo Elie Jean Bliase, Ledoux Fosso, Fabrice Joufang, Frank Watio (Panda RL) Pitoile Assomo, Paul Atungsiri Ndifor, Georgane Ngoufack (Rock RL) Carol Manga, Khalil Njoya (Unattached).

=== Ghana ===
Yakubu Suleman (Accra Majestics), Jonas Moorkaar (Accra Panthers), Anane Benjamin, Bawa Bright, Geotrah Desmond, Collins Ofosu, Nigel Sackey (Bulls), Levi Osei (Canterbury Bulldogs), Sean Sabutey (Glebe Dirty Reds), Oliver Puman (Nungua Tigers), Jonathan Adotey, Philip Asomani, John Bless Mensah (Pirates), Emmanuel Acheampong, Riddick Alibah, Jordan Annan, William Pearce Biney, Chris da Gama, Francis Lawson, David Nartey (Skolars), Isaac Akuoko (Wyong Roos).

=== Kenya ===
Denish Ndinya (AP), John Awiti Oketch, Raymond Ekutu (Rhinos), Tony Khadambi, Brony Lucky, Timothy Thimba (Ruffians), Joel Inzuga, Eliakim Kichoi, Celestine Mboi, Floyd Wambwire, (Sharks), James Maranga, Ramadan Masete, Finely Mokoro, Remi Odhiambo, Victor Odhiambo, Philimon Olang, Paul Seda (Winam), Horus Alela, Ahmed Hamed, Collin Ochieng, Wyclif Ratemo (Wolves).

=== Nigeria ===
Anthony Tuoyo Egodo (Birmingham Mosley RFC), Michael Ayodeji Ogunwole (British Army), Abdullah Balogun (Castleford Tigers), Kalu Shedrack Agwu (Eko Trinity), Daniel Okoro (Hull KR), Jude Abrakson, Emmanuel Onyekwe Ebuk, Julius Godwin, Nuhu Ibrahim, Gabriel John, Issa Omale, Ibrahim Suraju, Bashir Usman, Obi Wilsom (Kano Lions), Azuka Chika, Daniel John, Isah Lawal-Saulawa (Bedford Tigers), Olisa Nwokedi, Kelvin Olisa, Akeem Yusuf (Lagos Haven), Rio-Osayomwanbo Christoper Corkill (St Helens).

== Bracket ==
Semi-finals
Ghana	26
Kenya	6
Nigeria	36
Cameroon	2

Final
Ghana	4
Nigeria	30
Third place
Kenya	16
Cameroon	0

== Fixtures ==
=== Semi-finals ===
27 September 2022
13:00 GMT (UTC±00:00)

Ghana	26–6	Kenya
Tries: Bless, Acheampang (2), Da Gama Odun(2); Goals: Da Gama Odun (3)	Report (ERL)	Tries: Matua; Goals: Hamed

University of Ghana Sports Grounds, Accra
Referee: Aaron Moore (England)

Team details
Ghana		Position	Kenya
Name	Number	Position	Number	Name
Isaac Akuoko	1	Fullback	1	Philemon Olang
Chris Ebo Da Gama Odun	2	Wing	2	Joel Inzuga
John Bless	3	Centre	3	Brian Mutua
Desmond Geotrah	4	Centre	4	Tony Khadhambi
William Pearce Biney	5	Wing	5	Collins Ochieng
Collins Ofosu	6	Stand off	6	Shabani Hamed
Sean Sabutey	7	Scrum half	7	John Awiti
Alibah Riddick Agrokwah	8	Prop forward	8	Horus Alela
Jonas Moorkar	9	Hooker	9	Denish Ndinya
Nigel Nhampim Sackey	10	Prop forward	10	Celestine Mboi
Emmanuel Acheampong	11	Second row	11	Reymond Ekutu
Bawah Bright	12	Second row	12	Paul Seda
Oliver Puman on Yelib	13	Loose forward	13	Eliakim Kichoi
Philp Asomani	14	Interchange	14	Victor Ochieng
Levi Osei	15	Interchange	15	Ramadhan Masete
Jordan Issac Annan	16	Interchange	16	Wycliff Ratemo
Johathan Adotey	17	Interchange	17	James Maranga
Andy Gilvary		Coach		John Mbai

27 September 2022
15:30 GMT (UTC±00:00)

Nigeria	36–2	Cameroon
Tries: Gabriel, Godwin, Lawal, Ayodeji (3), Okoro; Goals: Gabriel (3)	Report (ERL)	Goals: Nkouak

University of Ghana Sports Grounds, Accra
Referee: Aaron Moore (England)

Team details
Nigeria		Position	Cameroon
Name	Number	Position	Number	Name
Daniel John	1	Fullback	1	Watio Franck
Abdullah Balogun	2	Wing	2	Embella Mouhamed
Blank Tuoyo Egodo	3	Centre	3	Tientchem Manual
Olisa Kelvin	4	Centre	4	Nguele Hermand
Isah Lawal	5	Wing	5	Patrick Nkouak
Rio Osayomwambo	6	Stand off	6	Nzokou Martial
John Gabriel	7	Scrum half	7	Armel Damjda
Kalu Shedrack	8	Prop forward	8	Bekolo Elie
Nuhu Ibrahim	9	Hooker	9	Khalil Njoya
Ibrahim Suraj	10	Prop forward	10	Ndifor Paul
Daniel Okoro	11	Second row	11	Carol Manga
Jude Abrackson	12	Second row	12	Joufang Tabrice
Michsael Ayodeji	13	Loose forward	13	Cyrille Kamole
Jukien Godwin	14	Interchange	14	Lamarc Oudi
L Bashir Usman	15	Interchange	15	Bidjana Jean Claude
Emmauel Onyekwe	16	Interchange	16	Ngoufack Georgane
Yussef Akeem	17	Interchange	17	Fosso Ledoux
Bolu Fagborun		Coach		Kahlil Njoya

=== Third place play-off ===
1 October 2022
12:00 GMT (UTC±00:00)

Kenya	16–0	Cameroon
Tries: Olang, Bryon (2), Iuzuga	Report (ERL)

University of Ghana Sports Grounds, Accra
Referee: Aaron Moore (England)

Team details
Kenya		Position	Cameroon
Name	Number	Position	Number	Name
Philemon Olang	1	Fullback	1	Franck Watio
Ramadhan Masete	2	Wing	2	Mouhamed Embella
Collins Ochieng	3	Centre	3	Manuel De Porta
Lucky Byron	4	Centre	4	Cyrille Kamole
Jeol Inzuga	5	Wing	5	Hermand Nguele
Shabani Hamed	6	Stand off	6	Patrick Nkouak
Victor Ochieng	7	Scrum half	7	Martial Nzokou
Horus Alela	8	Prop forward	8	Armel Damdja Tankeu
Denish Ndinja	9	Hooker	9	Elie Bekolo
Paul Seda	10	Prop forward	10	Khalil Njoya
Tony Khamdambi	11	Second row	11	Paul Ndifor
James Maranga	12	Second row	12	Carol Manga
Eliakim Kichoi	13	Loose forward	13	Fabrice Joufang
Raymond Ekutu	14	Interchange
Brian Mutua	15	Interchange
Celestine Mboi	16	Interchange
Wycliffe Ratemo	17	Interchange
John Mbai		Coach		Kahlil Njoya

=== Final ===
1 October 2022
14:30 GMT (UTC±00:00)

Ghana	4–30	Nigeria
Tries: Bless Mensah (44'); Goals: John (3)	Report (ERL)	Tries: Egodo (15'), Ayodeji (20'), Okoro (25'), Omale (39'), Ayodeji (67'), Lawal (76')

University of Ghana Sports Grounds, Accra
Referee: Aaron Moore (England)

Team details
Ghana		Position	Nigeria
Name	Number	Position	Number	Name
Isaac Akuoko	1	Fullback	1	Daniel John
Chris da Gama	2	Wing	2	Isah Lawal
John Bless Mensah	3	Centre	3	Tuoyo Egodo
Desmond Geotrah	4	Centre	4	Olisa Kelvin
William Pearce Biney	5	Wing	5	Abdallah Balogun
Collins Ofosu	6	Stand off	6	Gabriel John
Sean Sabutey	7	Scrum half	7	Rio Osayomwanbo
Riddick Alibah	8	Prop forward	8	Ibrahim Suraj
Philip Asomani	9	Hooker	9	Isa Omale
Nigel Sackey	10	Prop forward	10	Emmanuel Onyekwe
Emmanuel AcheamPong	11	Second row	11	Jude Abrackson
Bahah Bright	12	Second row	12	Daniel Okoro
Oliver Puman	13	Loose forward	13	Michael Ayodeji
Jonas Moorkaar	14	Interchange	14	Julian Godwin
Levi Osei	15	Interchange	15	Bashir Usman
Jordan Annan	16	Interchange	16	Azuka Chika
Jonathon Adotey	17	Interchange	17	Yuseef Akeem
Andy Gilvary		Coach		Bolu Fagborun

== See also ==
- Rugby league in Africa
- International rugby league in 2022
