= 2020 MEA Rugby League Cup =

2020 Middle-East Africa Championship
- Number of teams: 4
- Host country: South Africa
- Matches played: 4

The 2020 Middle East-Africa Rugby League Cup was a planned international rugby league tournament that would have taken place in October 2020. It was intended to be the third MEA Championship, following the 2015 and 2019 tournaments.

The competition was to be held at the Tuks Stadium in Pretoria, South Africa. The competition would have seen the return of Nigeria and Morocco from the 2019 edition, whilst Lebanon and South Africa who both participated in the 2015 edition were to again feature in the tournament. The Rugby League European Federation (RLEF) has announced that the tournament will continue henceforth on a two-year cycle, with the fourth tournament originally planned for 2022. In June 2020, the tournament was postponed due to the COVID-19 pandemic. The next edition of the tournament is to be held in 2022 in Ghana.

== Scheduled fixtures ==
=== Semi-finals ===
13 October 2020
14:00 CAT (UTC+2)

Nigeria	Postponed	Lebanon

Tuks Stadium, Pretoria

13 October 2020
17:00 CAT (UTC+2)

South Africa	Postponed	Morocco

Tuks Stadium, Pretoria

=== Third place play-off ===
17 October 2020
14:00 CAT (UTC+2)

Loser of South Africa v Morocco	Postponed	Loser of Nigeria v Lebanon

Tuks Stadium, Pretoria

=== Final ===
17 October 2020
17:00 CAT (UTC+2)

Winner of South Africa v Morocco	Postponed	Winner of Nigeria v Lebanon

Tuks Stadium, Pretoria

== See also ==
- Rugby league in Africa
- International rugby league in 2020
