= MEA Rugby League Championships =

International rugby tournament

MEA Championships
- Sport: Rugby league
- Instituted: 2015
- Number of teams: 4
- Region: Middle-East and Africa (MEARL)

The Middle East-Africa (MEA) Rugby League Championship is a rugby league football competition for national teams from the Middle East and Africa which is organised by Middle East Africa Rugby League, a sub-branch of the European Rugby League. The first tournament was held in 2015 as a part of the qualification process for the 2017 Rugby League World Cup.

== History ==
The MEA Championships was founded in 2015 as the 2017 Rugby League World Cup qualification (Middle East-Africa play-off) between Lebanon and South Africa.

The tournament was reborn in 2019 under the name "Middle East and Africa Championship", with the inaugural reformatted version being hosted in Lagos. The 2019 edition featured national teams only from West Africa: Nigeria, Morocco, Ghana, and Cameroon.

In 2019, The European Rugby League announced an additional tournament will be played in 2020 with Burundi, Lebanon, Nigeria, and South Africa bidding to host. The tournament was initially planned as an MEA Championship with the competition to be held ever two years there after. The tournament would feature the winners and runners-up of the 2019 edition as well as Lebanon and South Africa. Following an announcement in February 2020, the tournament would take the name "Middle East and Africa Cup" setting the basis of the two tiered competition. However, in June 2020, the tournament was postponed due to the COVID-19 pandemic.

The scheduled for 2022 competition would act as qualification for the 2025 Men's Rugby League World Cup, and be played in Ghana using the same format.

== Format ==
With the exception of the inaugural edition featuring only Lebanon and South Africa, the MEA Championships have been played as a two tier competition played over two consecutive years. The tournament features a four team knockout draw in year one to decide the "Championship" winners, before winners and runners-up play against Lebanon and South Africa (two historically more advanced rugby league nations) in year two following the same format to decide the "Cup" winners. In years league up to the Rugby League World Cup, the tournament has been used as the MEA qualification tournament.

== Results ==
Edition	Tournament	Host	Winner	Score	Runner-up	Third-place	Score	Fourth-place	Number of teams
2015 (2017 RLWC qualification)		South Africa	Lebanon	90 – 28 (Note: Aggregate over two matches)	South Africa	N/A			2
2019–20 (Note: The 2020 MEA Cup did not serve as qualification for the 2021 Men's Rugby League World Cup as Lebanon had automatically qualified by reaching the knockout stage of the 2017 World Cup, thus taking MEA's direct qualification slot. South Africa was MEA's representative in the inter-confederational qualification tournament, however they failed to qualify.)	2019 Championship	Nigeria	Nigeria	38 – 10	Morocco	Ghana	10 – 4	Cameroon	4
2019–20	2020 Cup	South Africa	Tournament cancelled due to the COVID-19 pandemic						4
2022–23 (2025 RLWC qualification)	2022 Championship	Ghana	Nigeria	30 – 4	Ghana	Kenya	16 – 0	Cameroon	4
2022–23 (2025 RLWC qualification)	2023 Cup	Not announced	Tournament cancelled due to the change in international calendar caused by the cancellation of the 2025 World Cup						4

== See also ==
- International Rugby League
