= Rugby league in Africa =

Rugby league in Africa refers to the involvement of the sport of rugby league in the African continent.

As of 2020, rugby league has seen activity in countries such as Burundi, Cameroon, DR Congo, Ethiopia, Ghana, Kenya, Libya, Morocco, Nigeria, Sierra Leone, South Africa and Uganda

== History ==
=== Initial establishment in South Africa ===
Rugby league in Africa was first conceptualised in South Africa in the 1950s. In 1953, Ludwig Japhet headed a committee which was solely formed for the purpose of promoting the sport in the country. Ludwig had a meeting with English administrator Bill Fallowfield to discuss the possibility of developing the game in South Africa. In 1957, games were organised against Great Britain and French national teams in Benoni, Durban, and East London for the purpose of promoting the sport. However, all teams saw the fixtures as friendly matches, which also resulted in the cancellation of the third match in East London.

After the death of Ludwig Japhet, two organisations were formed in a bid to continue developing rugby league in South Africa. The National Rugby League (NRL) was headed by Norman Lacey, and the Rugby League South Africa (RLSA) was formed by Maurice Smith. As both organisations saw themselves as the governing body of the sport, they each had plans to commence a competition in the summer of 1962. Unfortunately for rugby league in South Africa, the two organisations could not settle their differences and each went ahead with their own competitions; so was born rugby league in South Africa, under confusing and hostile circumstances.

In 1962, after a merger between the NRL and RLSA, South Africa officially became a member of the RLIF. This meant South Africa would play international test-matches for the first time. South Africa's first official test match was a 30–49 defeat against Great Britain in front of 10,000 fans in Pretoria.

Due to the developing success South Africa were experiencing with their national game, and the national team's promising results against Great Britain, the South Africans were invited for a tour of Australia to play against the Australian national team. However, the South Africans were totally outplayed in all their matches. This had a severe impact on the development on the sport in the country, and it wouldn't be until the 1990s that they would reappear on the international scene.

=== 1990s: Morocco and South Africa compete globally ===
After the sport suffered a 30-year hiatus, Dave Southern, a former player for the Widnes Vikings, wanted to re-introduce rugby league into the country South Africa. He was playing rugby union in Johannesburg at the time. In early 1990, an advertisement was placed in the Sunday Star newspaper looking for people who were interested in playing, officiating, supporting and developing Rugby League in South Africa to call Dave Southern. As a result of a positive response, trial games were held. In 1992, South African Rugby League held its first-ever domestic competition, and the South African national team played a test-series against Russia.

Another country that was beginning to incorporate the idea of rugby league was Kenya. Edward Rombo, a rugby-union player, who was playing for the Leeds Rhinos at the time, wanted to introduce the sport of rugby league into Kenya.

Morocco were also a developing rugby league nation, and became an International rugby league member in 1995 as a result. They subsequently played their first international test-matches in the 1995 Emerging Nations tournament. However, they would finish at the bottom of their pool after losing both of their encounters.

South Africa would become the first African nation to compete in the Rugby League World Cup. South Africa was grouped with Australia, England, and Fiji in the 1995 World Cup. South Africa were dominated in all their matches, only managing to score 12 points in the entire tournament.

The 1999 World Club Challenge between the Super League and NRL champions was mooted as a showpiece fixture at Ellis Park in Johannesburg. However this didn't eventuate.

=== 2000s ===
In 2000, Rombo, alongside entrepreneur Eric Murungi, set up rugby league teams, coaching, and an official website in Kenya. However, despite the efforts, rugby league would struggle to establish a foothold in the country for at least another decade.

In 2009 there were two South Africans playing in Australia. Jarrod Saffy played for the St. George Illawarra Dragons in the game's premier NRL competition, while Allan Heldsinger played for the Redcliffe Dolphins in the Queensland Cup. In 2010 the Sydney Roosters had signed South African rugby union juniors JP Du Plessis, and Brian Skosana. The NRL had plans to sign more South Africans in the future.

Morocco became the first African country to win an international event, by winning the 2009 Euro Med Challenge. Morocco's team included professional players Younes Khattabi and Jamal Fakir, the latter of whom had previously represented France.

=== 2010s: Africa United Rugby League ===
In 2011, South Africa now had an established domestic league which included three competitions: Rhino Cup (first division), Protea Cup (second division), and Western Province Rugby League (third division).

In 2012, a similar concept to the Latin Heat was developed but for African-based players. This team would be known as Africa United.

In 2013, South Africa put forward a bid to host the 2017 World Cup. However the bid did not receive central government funding, and there were fears a South African World Cup would result in financial loss, for rugby league, due to the second nature of the sport compared to rugby union in the country.

In 2014, Kenya played their first ever rugby league international against an Italian representative team. 5,000 turned up to watch the match, which the Kenyans won by 10 points, at a local primary school in Watamu.

In 2015, South Africa were hosts of the Middle East-Africa play-off for the 2017 World Cup. The games were held in Brakpan. SARL president, Kobus Botha, hoped that this would be the first of many international events in the country, and as a result showcase the country as potential hosts for the 2021 World Cup. South Africa lost both matches to Lebanon convincingly. This resulted in the Rhinos failing to qualify for their third consecutive World Cup, and ended any possibility of SARL hosting the 2021 event.

In 2018, Africa United competed in the 2018 Emerging Nations Confederations Cup tournament. Africa United finished runners-up after losing to the Mediterranean-Middle East representatives in the final.

In 2019, former London Broncos player Ade Adebisi revealed how he was able to establish rugby league in Nigeria. A ten team competition was established, with 5 being based Lagos, and another 5 being based in the north of the country. Professional English clubs, Leeds Rhinos, Wakefield Trinity, and Whitehaven R.L.F.C., have also partnered with Nigerian RL to help set up the Lagos Rhinos, Lagos Haven, and Eko Trinity clubs.

As a result of Africa United, Ghana, Nigeria, and Cameroon were able play their first test-matches in a newly created Middle East-Africa Championship. Nigeria won the first edition, as hosts, in 2019. The Cameroon national team had to travel by bus for eight days go get to Lagos for the competition.

== International ==
=== Members ===
Country	Membership
Burundi	Observer
Cameroon	Affiliate
DR Congo	Observer
Ethiopia	Observer
Ghana	Affiliate
Libya	Observer
Morocco	Affiliate
Nigeria	Affiliate
South Africa	Full
Uganda
