= 2019 MEA Rugby League Championship =

2019 Middle-East Africa Championship
- Number of teams: 4
- Host country: Nigeria
- Winner: Nigeria (1st title)
- Matches played: 4

The 2019 Middle East-Africa Rugby League Championship was the second MEA Rugby League Championship, held in October 2019 at the Teslim Balogun Stadium in Lagos, Nigeria. The competition saw the international debut of Cameroon, Ghana and Nigeria, while Morocco played for the first time since the last MEA Championship, eight years previously.

== Fixtures ==
=== Semi-finals ===
2 October 2019
14:00 WAT (UTC+1)

Nigeria	25 – 12	Ghana
Tries: Fagborun (3), Adebiyi; Goals: I Lawal Saulawa (4/4); Field Goals: I Lawal Saulawa (1)	Report	Tries: Bless Mensah, Tettegah; Goals: Bless Mensah (2/2)

Teslim Balogun Stadium, Lagos
Referee: Phil Smith

2 October 2019
17:00 WAT (UTC+1)

Cameroon	4 – 8	Morocco
Tries: Emmanuel de Porta	Report	Goals: Iliass Laachiri (3/3); Field Goals: Iliass Laachiri (2)

Teslim Balogun Stadium, Lagos
Referee: Kevin de la Rose (France)

=== Third Place Play-off ===
5 October 2019
14:00 WAT (UTC+1)

Ghana	10 – 4	Cameroon
Tries: Sarpong, Tettegah; Goals: Tettegah (1)	Report	Tries: Hermand

Teslim Balogun Stadium, Lagos
Referee: Phil Smith

=== Final ===
5 October 2019

Nigeria	38 – 10	Morocco
Tries: Adebiyi (2), Agwoje(2), Prince, I Lawal-Saulawa, Izuchykwu, G. John; Goals: I Lawal-Saulawa (3), G. John (2)	Report	Tries: Eddiche, Laachiri; Goals: Laachiri (1)

Teslim Balogun Stadium, Lagos
Referee: Kevin de la Rose (France)

== Media coverage ==
Country or region	Broadcaster	Ref.
Nigeria	Yanga! TV	

== See also ==
- Rugby league in Africa
- International rugby league in 2019
