= Teslim Balogun =

Nigerian footballer (1931–1972)

Personal information
- Full name: Tesilimi Olawale Ayinde Balogun
- Date of birth: 27 March 1931
- Place of birth: Lagos, Nigeria
- Date of death: 30 July 1972 (aged 41)
- Place of death: Nigeria
- Position: Striker

Senior career*
Years	Team	Apps	(Gls)
- Apapa Bombers
1947	Marine Athletics		
- UAC XI
1949	Railways XI		
1951	Jos XI		
1952	Pan Bank Team		
1953	Dynamos Club		
- SCOA XI
1955–1956	Peterborough United	0	(0)
1956	Skegness Town		
1956–1957	Queens Park Rangers	13	(3)
1957–1958	Holbeach United		
1959–1961	Ibadan Lions		

International career
1948–1960	Nigeria		
- * Club domestic league appearances and goals

Tesilimi Olawale Ayinde "Teslim" Balogun (27 March 1931 – 30 July 1972) was a Nigerian football player and coach. Balogun played at both professional and international levels as a striker, before becoming Africa's first qualified professional football coach.

== Playing career ==
Educated in Port Harcourt and graduating from St. Mary's Catholic School, Balogun played in his native Nigeria for a number of teams, including Apapa Bombers, Marine Athletics, UAC XI, Railways XI, Jos XI, Pan Bank Team, Dynamos Club and SCOA XI. During his time in Nigeria, Balogun won the Challenge Cup a total of five times in seven finals. He was the first player to score a hat-trick in the competition, in Pan Bank's 6–1 rout of Warri in 1953.

After originally touring with a Nigerian select team in 1949, Balogun returned to the UK in August 1955 to sign with Peterborough United. However, Balogun never made a league appearance for Peterborough, and spent time with Skegness Town before signing with Queens Park Rangers, scoring 3 goals in 13 appearances in the Football League during the 1956–57 season. After leaving QPR, Balogun returned to non-League football, playing with Holbeach United.

Balogun was also a member of the Nigerian national side for 12 years.

== Coaching career ==
Balogun became the first African to qualify as a professional coach. He was the coach for the Nigeria football team at the 1968 Summer Olympics.

== Legacy ==
The Teslim Balogun Stadium in the Nigerian city of Lagos is named after him. The Teslim Balogun Foundation was founded after his death to assist the families of Nigerian ex-international footballers who may have fallen on hard times.

== Personal life ==
Balogun was nicknamed "Thunder" because of his powerful shot, and was also known as "Balinga" for a similar reason. During his time touring schools to coach youngsters, he was nicknamed "Baba Ball."

Balogun died in his sleep on 30 July 1972, at the age of 45. He had eight children.
