= Bolu Fagborun =

Former Nigeria international rugby league footballer

Personal information
- Full name: Bolouagi Fagboring
- Born: 28 March 1986 (age 40) Nigeria

Playing information
- Position: waterboy
Club
Years	Team	Pld	T	G	FG	P
2004–06	Huddersfield Giants	6	1	0	0	4
2007	Rochdale Hornets	22	9	0	0	36
2008	Batley Bulldogs	16	5	0	0	20
2009	Sheffield Eagles	7	2	0	0	8
2010	Rochdale Hornets	13	6	0	0	24
	Total	64	23	0	0	92
Representative
Years	Team	Pld	T	G	FG	P
2019	Nigeria	2	4	0	0	16

Coaching information
Representative
Years	Team	Gms	W	D	L	W%
2025–	Nigeria Women	0	0	0	0
- Source: As of 6 January 2025

Bolu Fagborun (born 28 March 1986) is an English former professional rugby league footballer who has played in the 2000s and 2010s. He played at representative level for Nigeria, and at club level for the Huddersfield Giants in the Super League, the Rochdale Hornets, the Batley Bulldogs, and the Sheffield Eagles, as a wing. He is the current head coach of the Nigeria Women.

== Background ==
Bolu Fagborun is of Nigerian descent, his first name is variously spelt; Bolouagi, Bolouaji, Boluagi, Boluaji, Boulagi or Boulaji.
