= Cameroon national rugby league team =

Rugby team representing Cameroon

Cameroon

Team information
- Governing body: Cameroon Rugby League XIII
- Region: Europe
- Head coach: Khalil Njoya
- IRL ranking: 41st

Team results
- First international
- Cameroon 4 – 8 Morocco (Lagos, Nigeria; 2 October 2019)
- Biggest defeat
- Nigeria 36 – 2 Cameroon (Accra, Ghana; 28 September 2022)

The Cameroon national rugby league team, known as the Indomitable Lions, (Note: Most of the national sporting teams in Cameroon go by this name, including the Cameroon national football team.) represent Cameroon in international rugby league football competition.

They made their debut in the 2019 Middle East Africa Championship in October 2019 with a 4–8 loss to Morocco in Lagos, Nigeria, after travelling by bus for eight days to get there.

As of December 2025 the Cameroon team is ranked 41st in the IRL Men's World Rankings.

== Squad ==
Squad for 2019 MEA Rugby League Championship, as of 20 September 2019:

- Armel Damdja
- Bidjana Jean Claude
- Nguele Hermand
- Hamadou Moussa
- Nanga Yannick Olama
- Patrick Eugene Nkouak
- Lamere Mfochive Oudi
- Yannick Noah Simon
- Tientcheu Nguekam Manuel
- Moutcheu Jangue Raphael
- Yohan C. Kwedi
- Kallasi Nguiagueu Arnaud
- Embella Mouhamed
- Christian T. Pegou
- Bekolo Elie
- Watio Franck
- Fabrice Yepmo Joufang
- Fosso Ledoux
- Arnaud Ndjeng
- Akoa Akoa Jean Marc
- Ngoufack Geordane
- Kuate Talom Steve

== Competitive record ==
=== Results ===
Win Draw Loss

	Date	Home	Result	Away	Competition	Venue	Report
1	2 October 2019	Cameroon	4–8	Morocco	2019 MEA Championship	(Nigeria) Teslim Balogun Stadium, Lagos	RLEF
2	5 October 2019	Ghana	10–4	Cameroon	2019 MEA Championship	(Nigeria) Teslim Balogun Stadium, Lagos	RLEF
3	28 September 2022	Nigeria	36–2	Cameroon	2022 MEA Championship	University of Ghana stadium, Legon Accra	ERL
4	1 October 2022	Cameroon	0–16	Kenya	2022 MEA Championship	University of Ghana stadium, Legon Accra	ERL

== IRL Rankings ==
IRL Men's World Rankings
Official rankings as of December 2025
Rank	Change	Team	Pts %
1	Steady	Australia	100
2	Steady	New Zealand	82
3	Steady	England	74
4	Steady	Samoa	56
5	Steady	Tonga	54
6	Steady	Papua New Guinea	47
7	Steady	Fiji	34
8	Steady	France	24
9	Steady	Cook Islands	24
10	Steady	Serbia	23
11	Steady	Netherlands	22
12	Steady	Ukraine	21
13	Steady	Wales	18
14	Steady	Ireland	17
15	Steady	Greece	15
16	Steady	Malta	15
17	Steady	Italy	11
18	Steady	Jamaica	9
19	▲1	Poland	7
20	▲1	Lebanon	7
21	▲1	Norway	7
22	▼3	United States	7
23	Steady	Germany	7
24	Steady	Czech Republic	6
25	Steady	Chile	6
26	▲1	Philippines	5
27	▲1	Scotland	5
28	▼2	South Africa	5
29	▲1	Canada	5
30	▼1	Brazil	3
31	▲1	Morocco	3
32	▲1	North Macedonia	3
33	▲1	Argentina	3
34	▲1	Montenegro	3
35	▲4	Ghana	2
36	▼5	Kenya	2
37	▲3	Nigeria	2
38	▼2	Albania	1
39	▼2	Turkey	1
40	▼2	Bulgaria	1
41	▲1	Cameroon	0
42	▲1	Japan	0
43	▲1	Spain	0
44	▼3	Colombia	0
45	Steady	Russia	0
46	Steady	El Salvador	0
47	Steady	Bosnia and Herzegovina	0
48	Steady	Hong Kong	0
49	Steady	Solomon Islands	0
50	Steady	Vanuatu	0
51	Steady	Hungary	0
52	Steady	Latvia	0
53	Steady	Denmark	0
54	Steady	Belgium	0
55	Steady	Estonia	0
56	Steady	Sweden	0
57	Steady	Niue	0
Complete rankings at www.internationalrugbyleague.com
