= Rugby League Federation Ghana =

Governing body for rugby in Ghana

- Founded: 6 April 2014
- Responsibility: Ghana

(Ghana)

The Rugby League Federation Ghana is the governing body for the sport of rugby league in Ghana. The RLFG was formed on 6 April 2014.

The federation has been a member of the International Rugby League (IRL) since 2014. In December 2025 membership of IRL was upgraded from associate membership to full membership, making the national teams eligible to qualify for the World Cups.

== Ghana 13s Championship ==
=== Teams ===
- Panthers RLFC
- Nungua Tigers
- Skolars RLC
- Bulls
- Accra Majestics

== National team ==
The Ghana national rugby league team represents Ghana in the sport of rugby league.

Coming into existence in 2012, the Ghanaian Rugby League project was started up by the Rugby League European Federation (RLEF) and UK Sport International’s programme after Rugby League 9s were introduced as a Category 3 Sport by the Commonwealth Sports Committee.

== Gallery ==
=== Male Teams ===
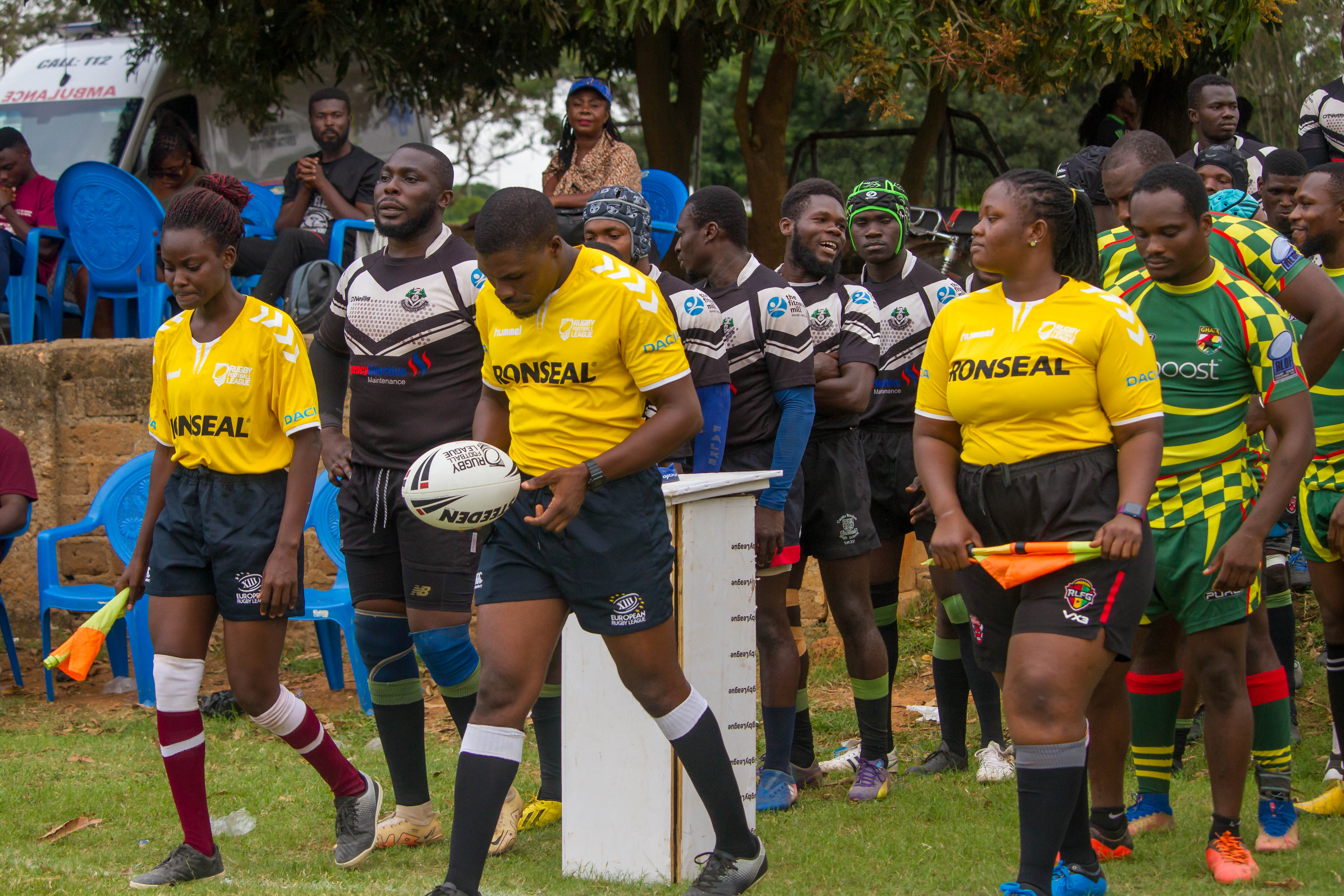

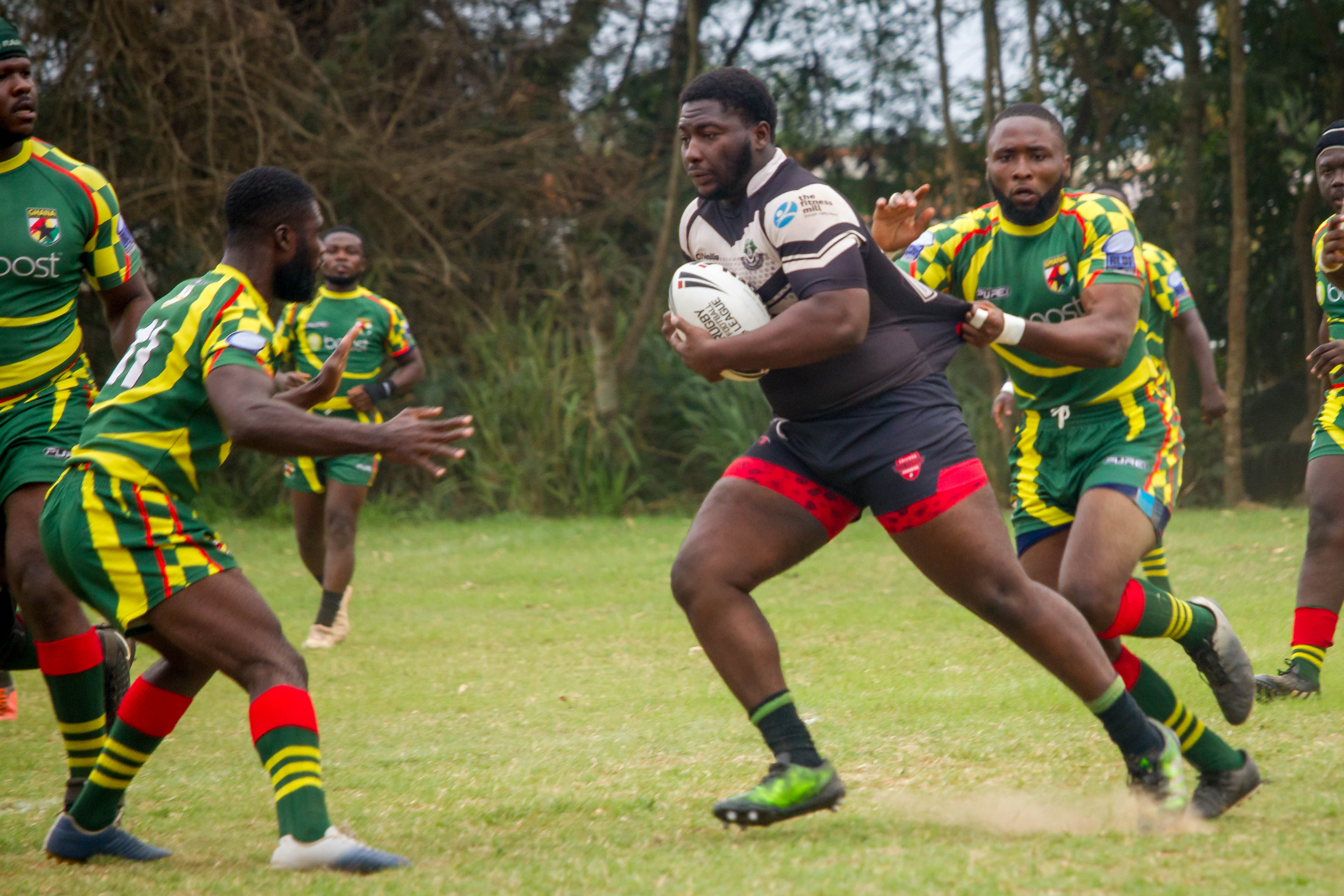

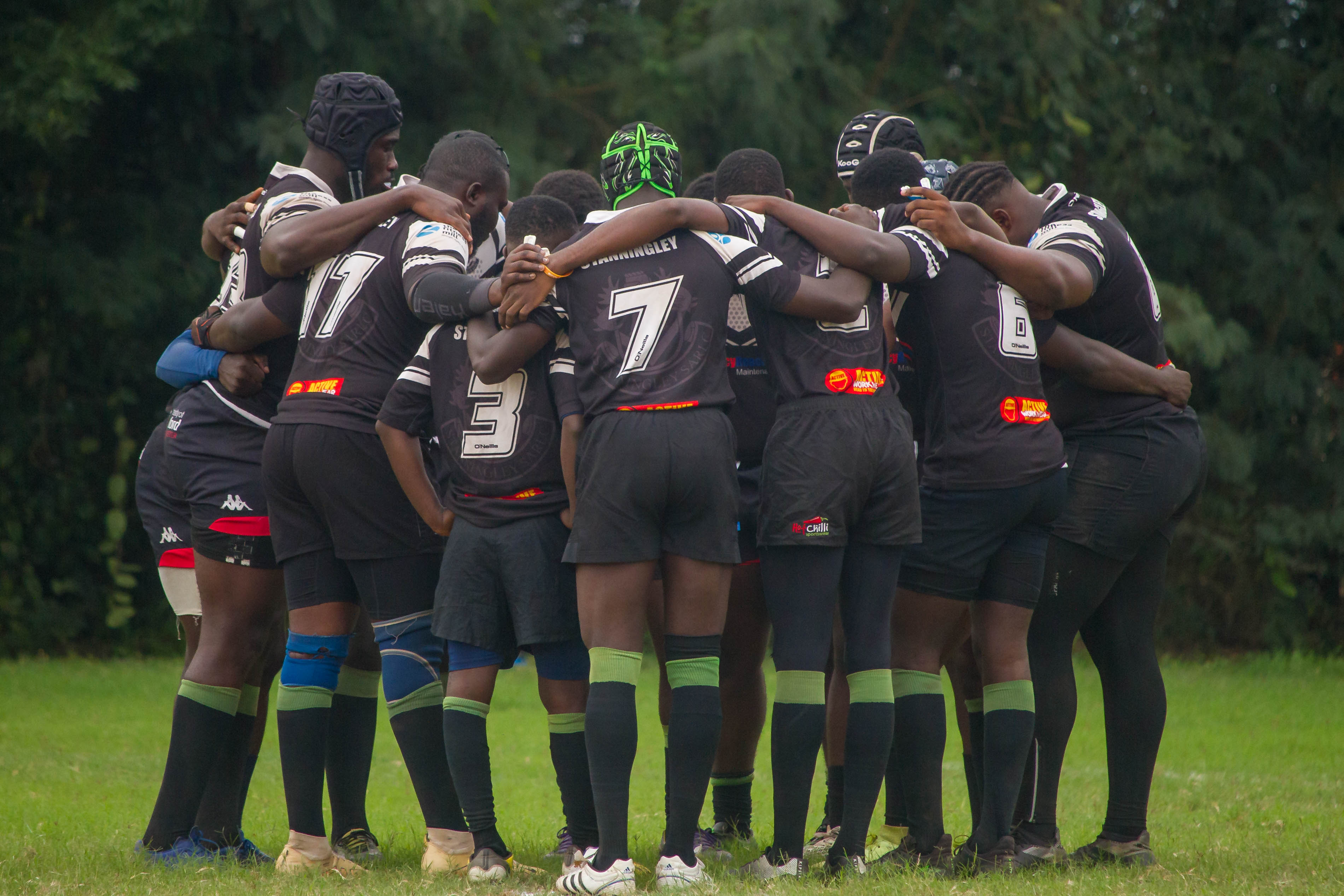

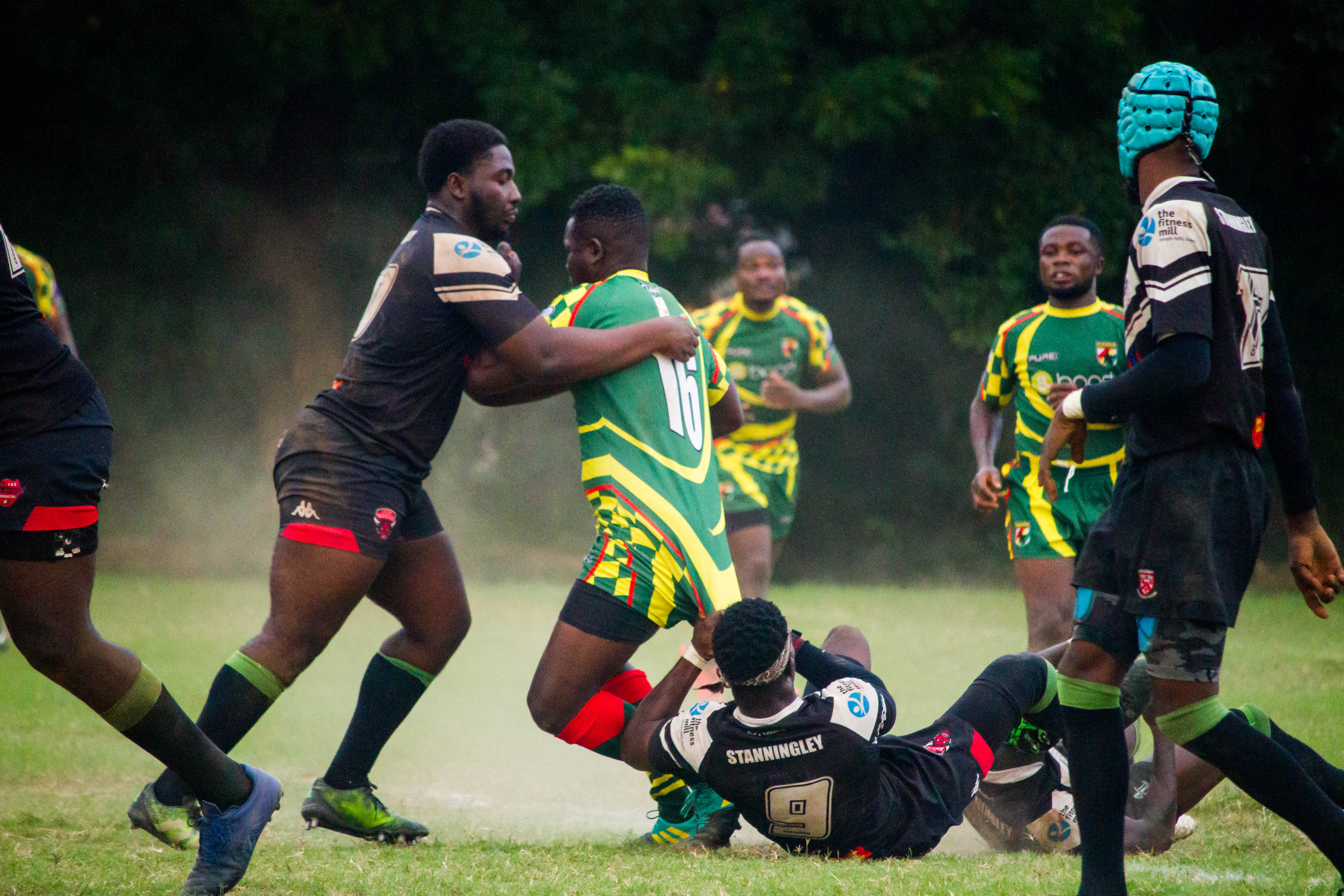

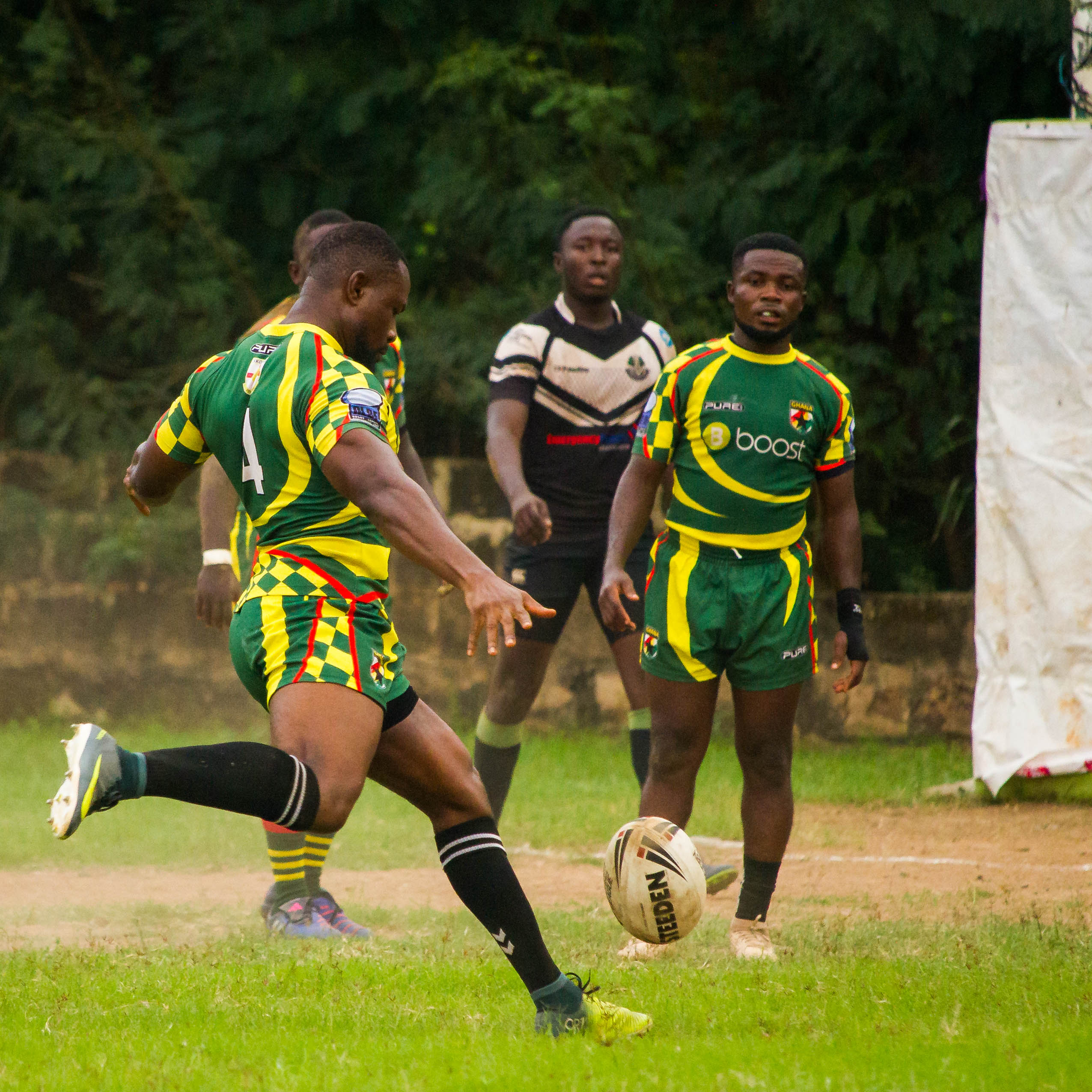

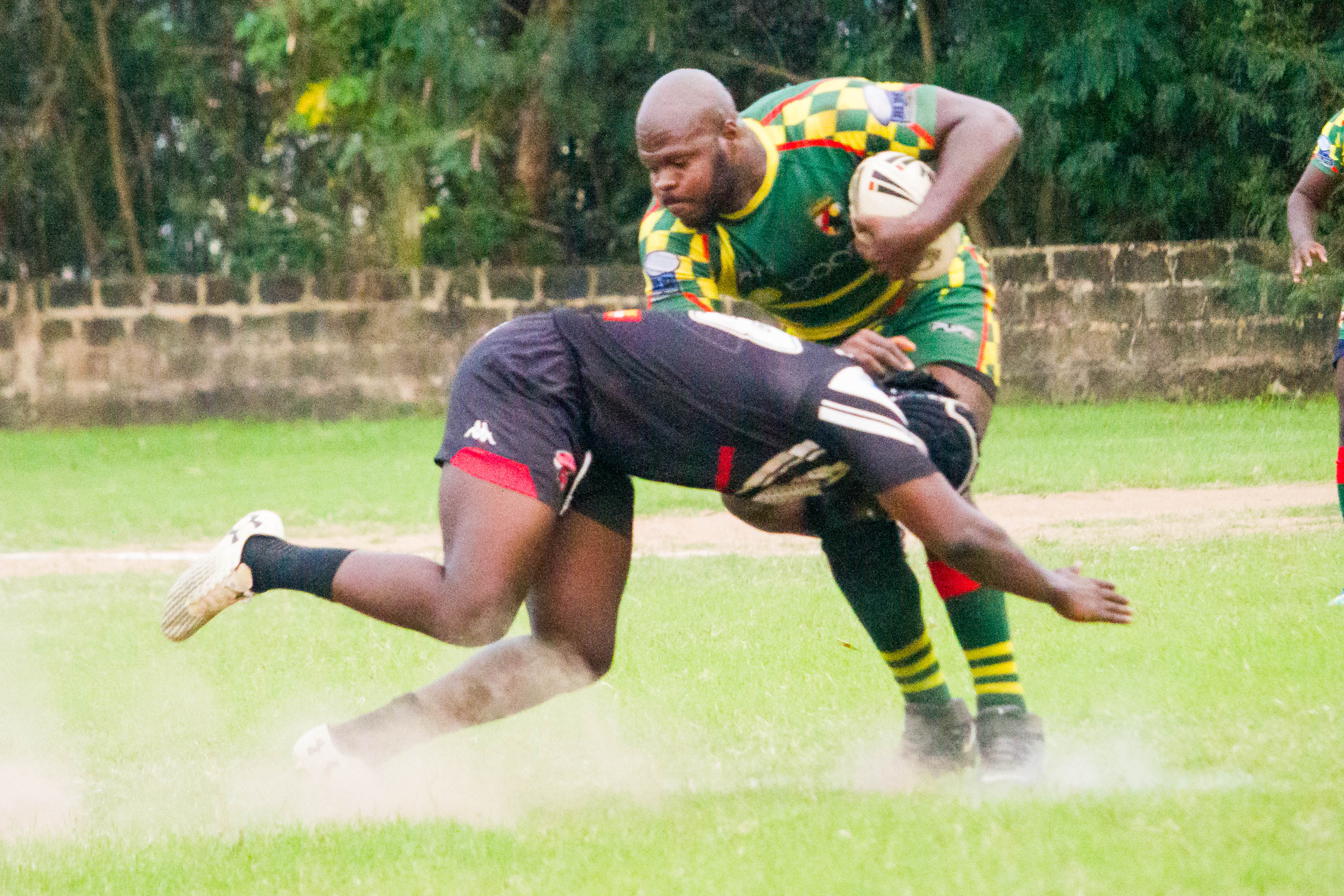

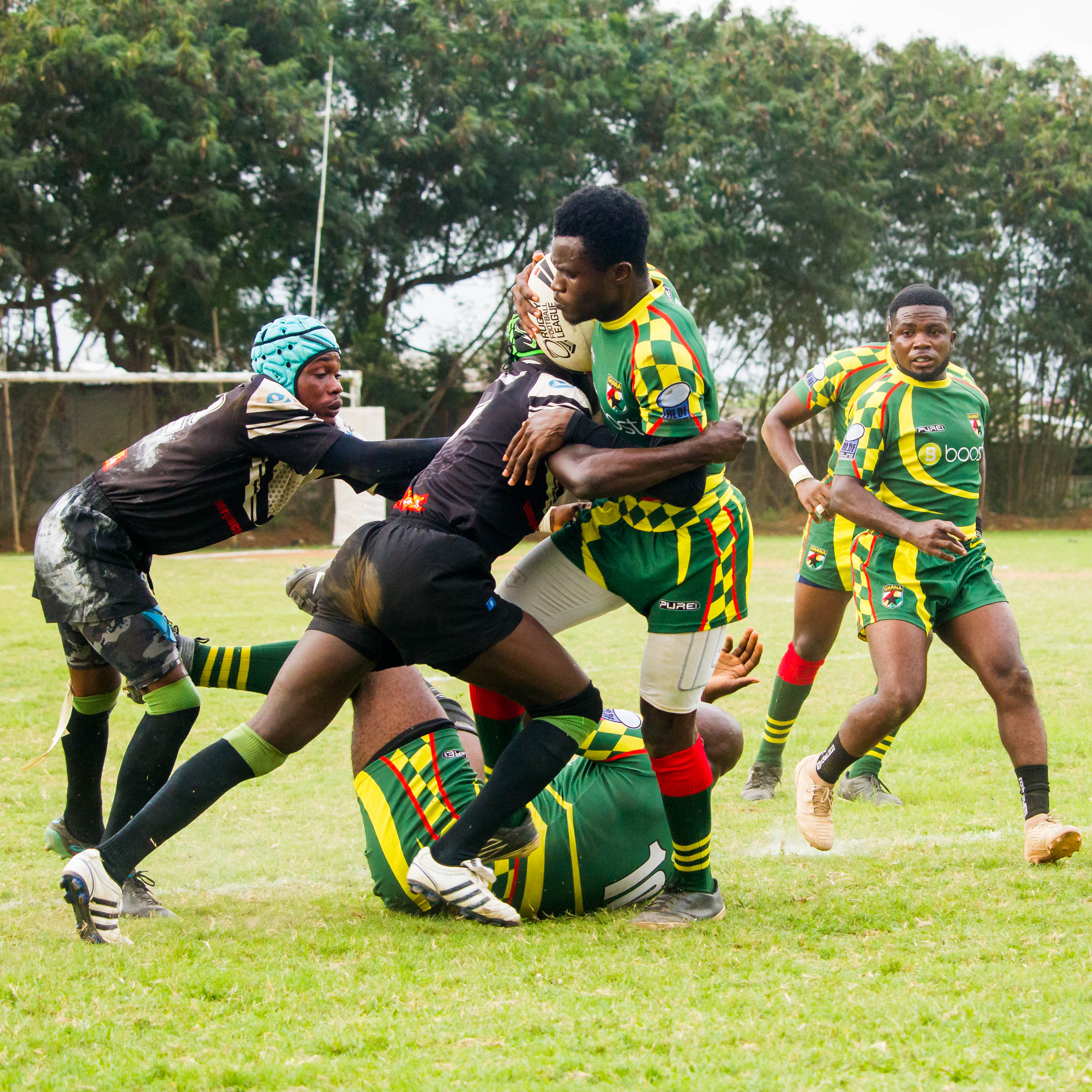

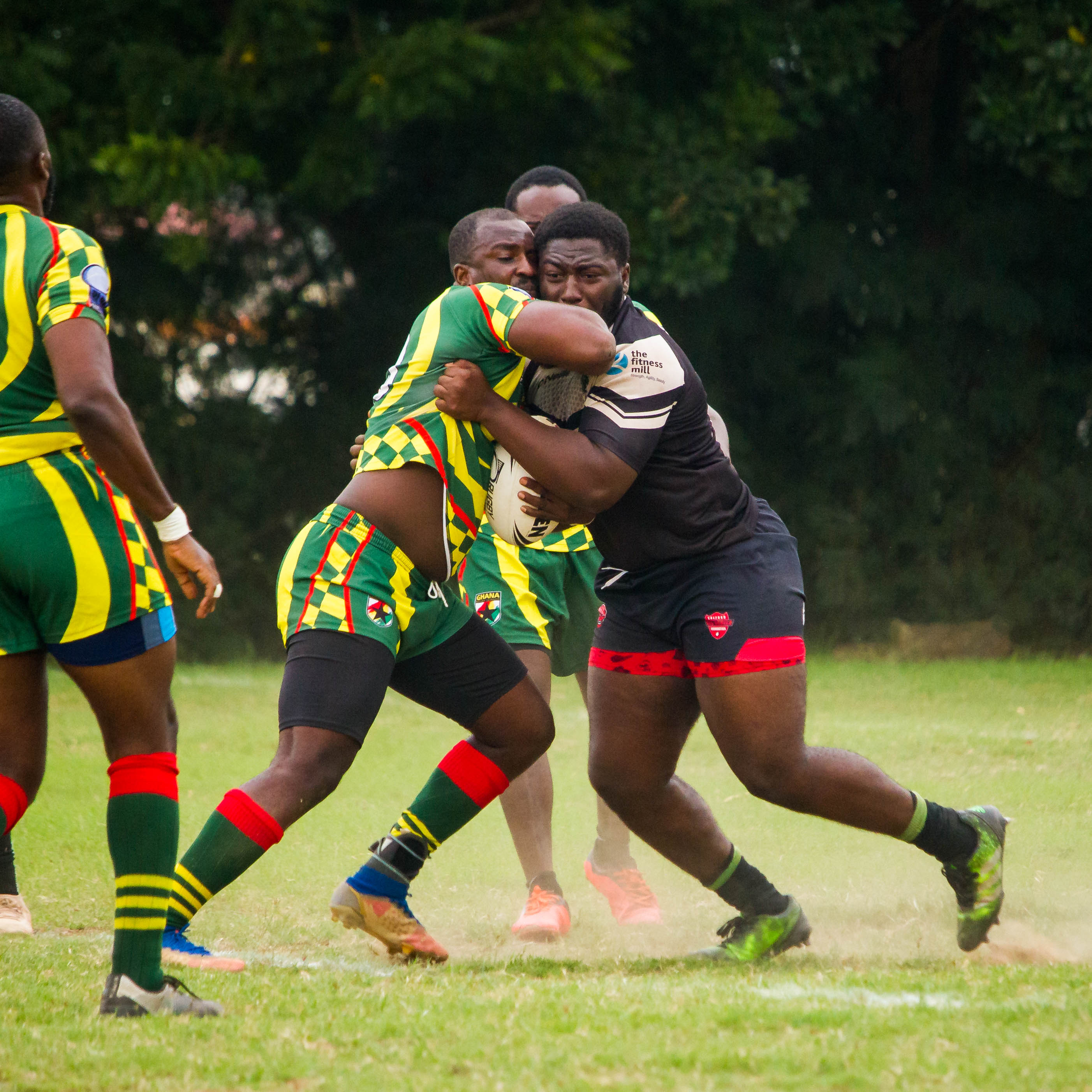

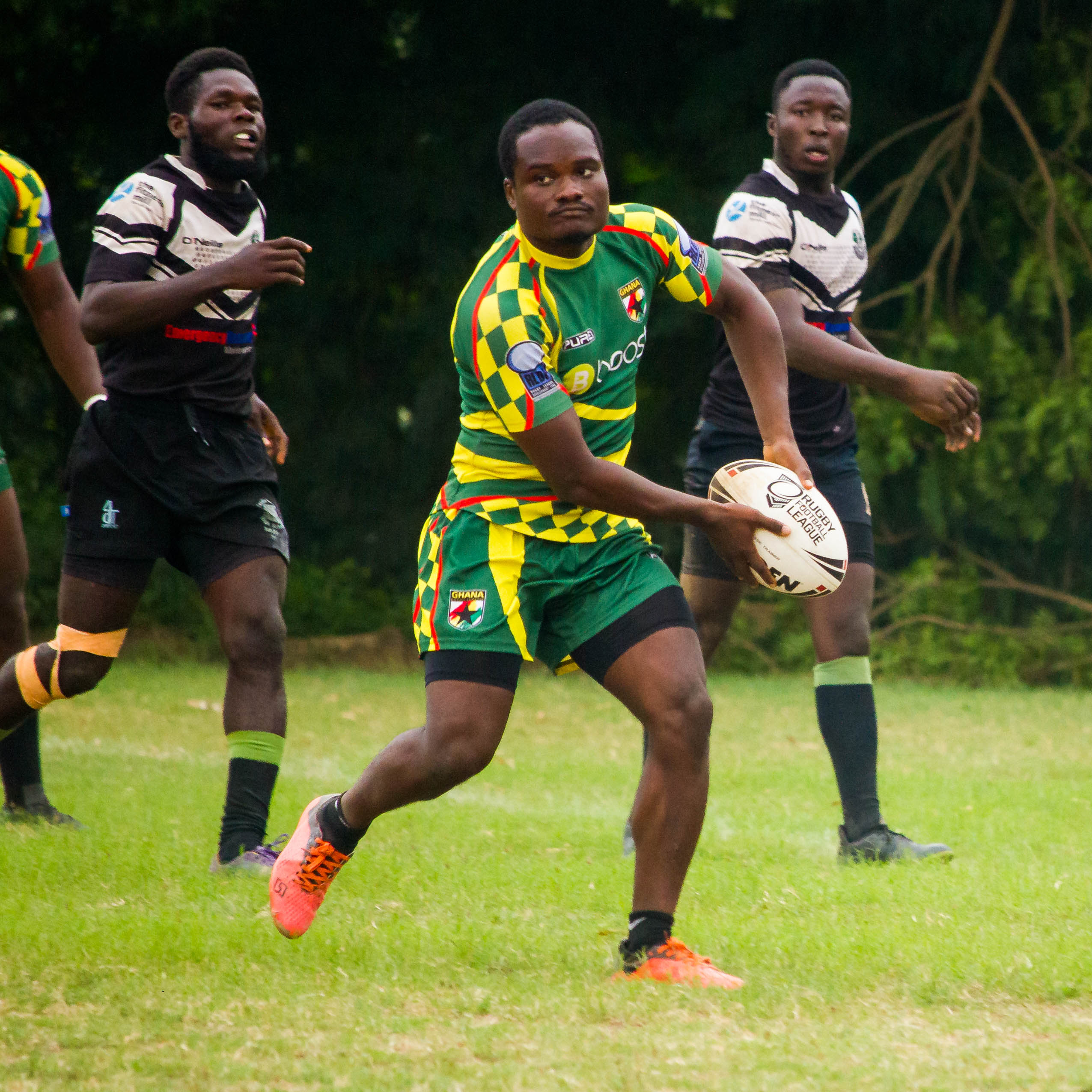

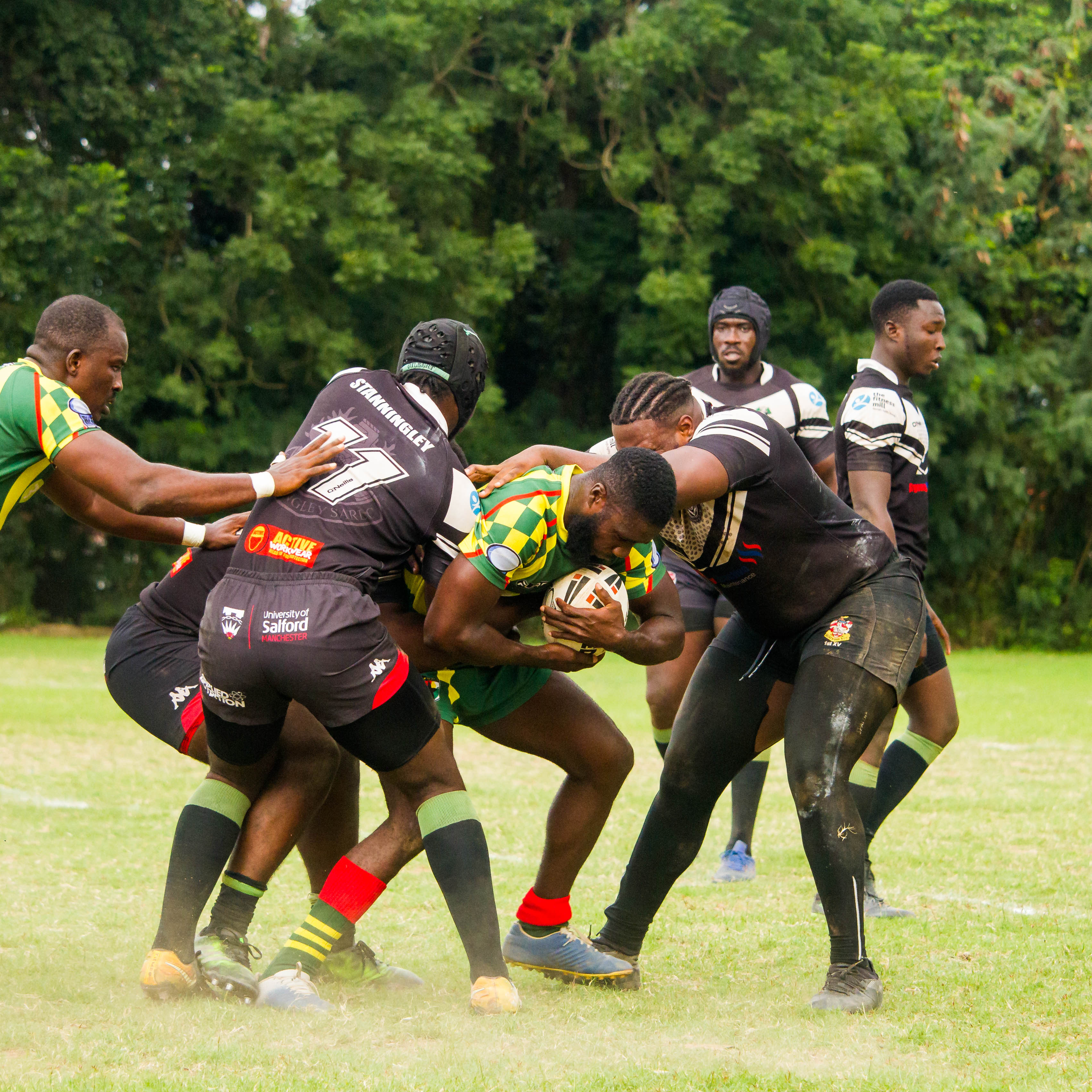

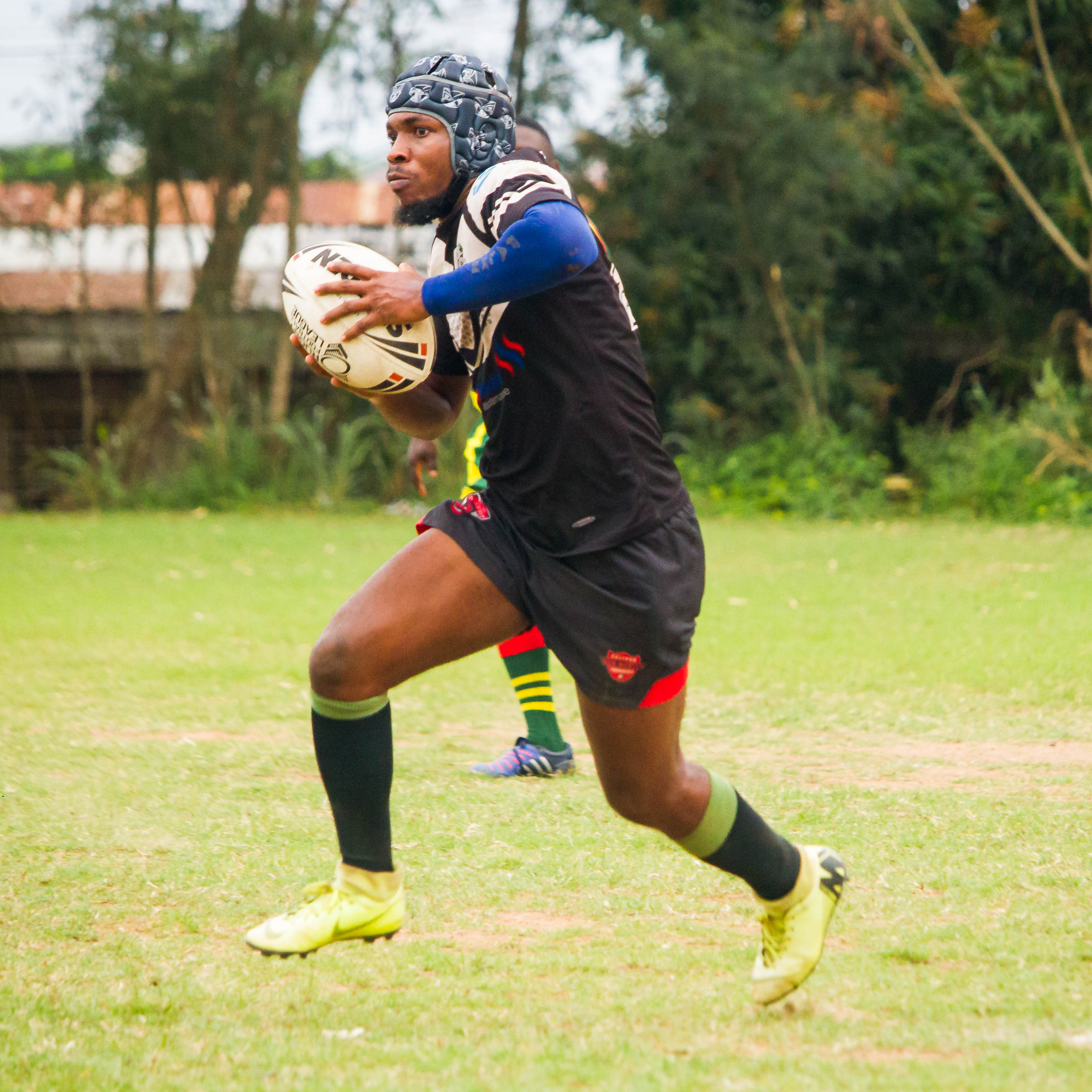

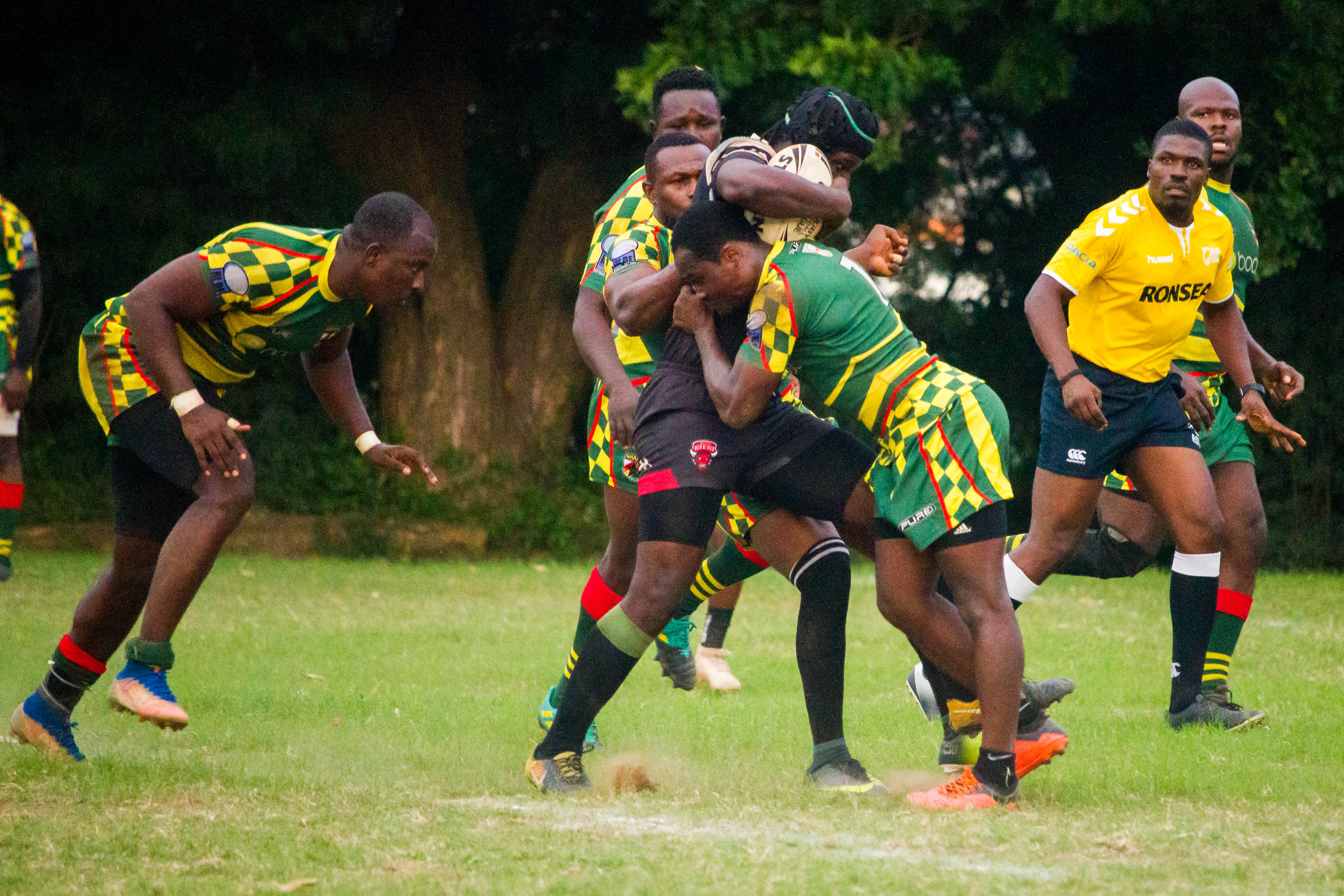

== Gallery ==
=== Female Teams ===
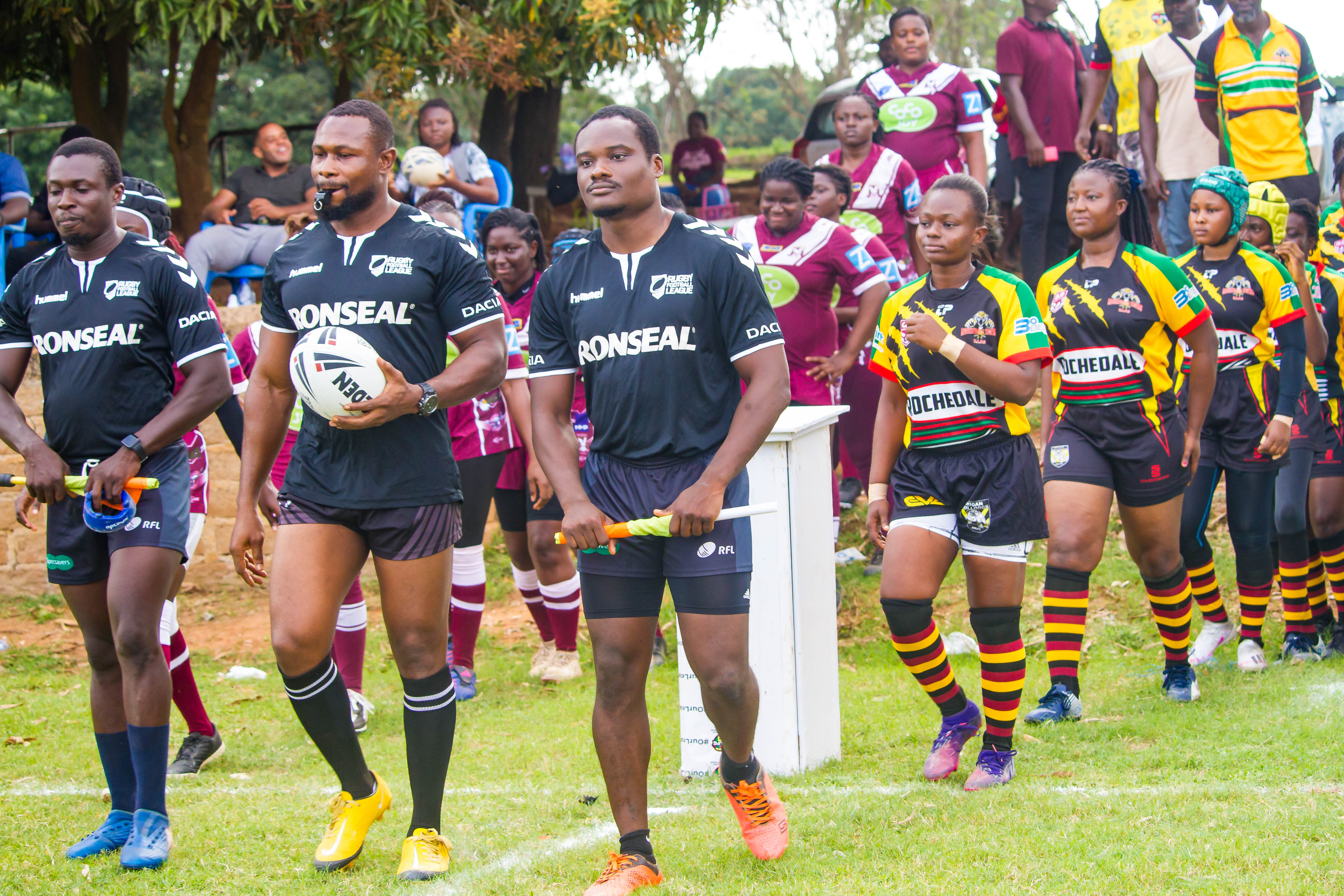

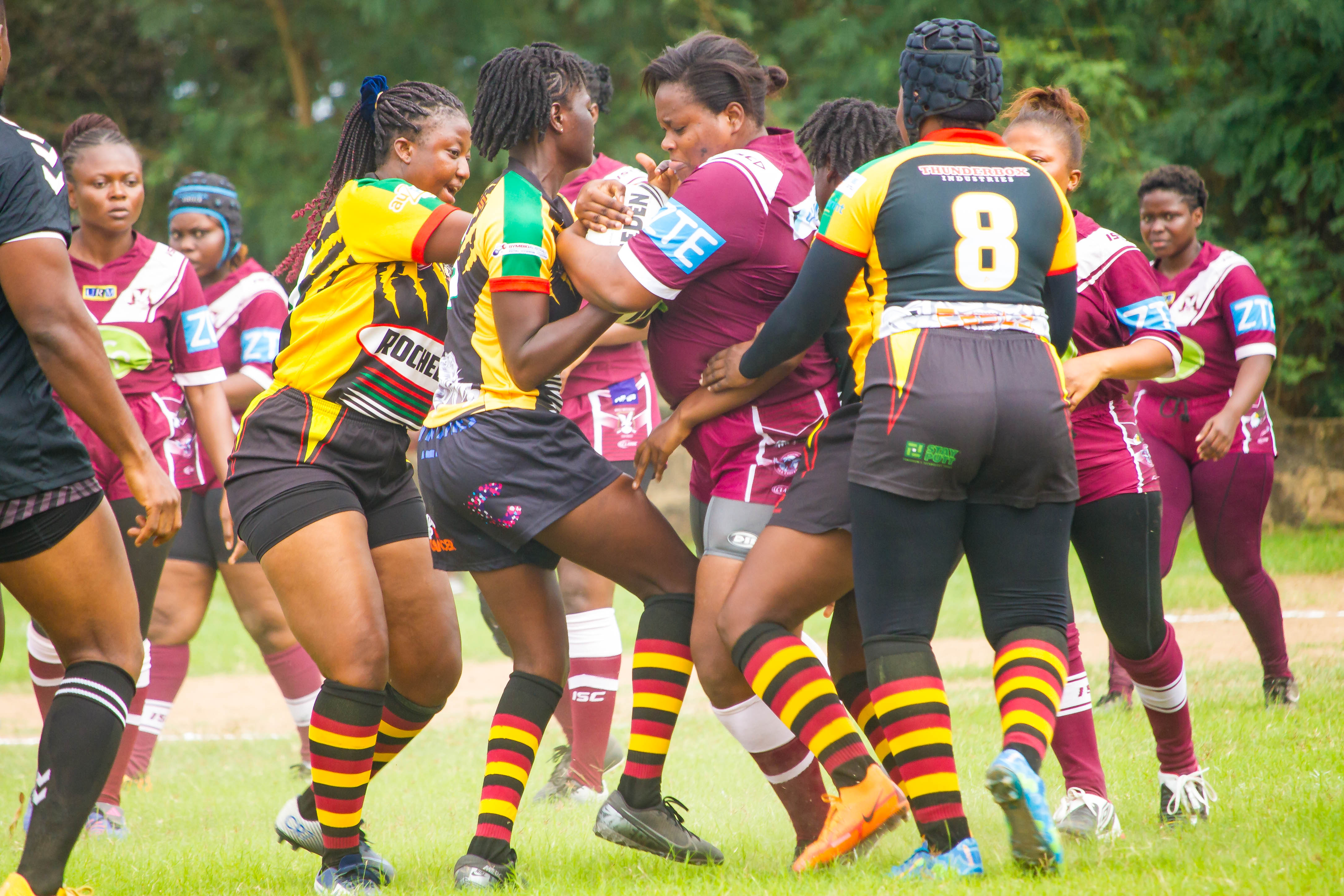

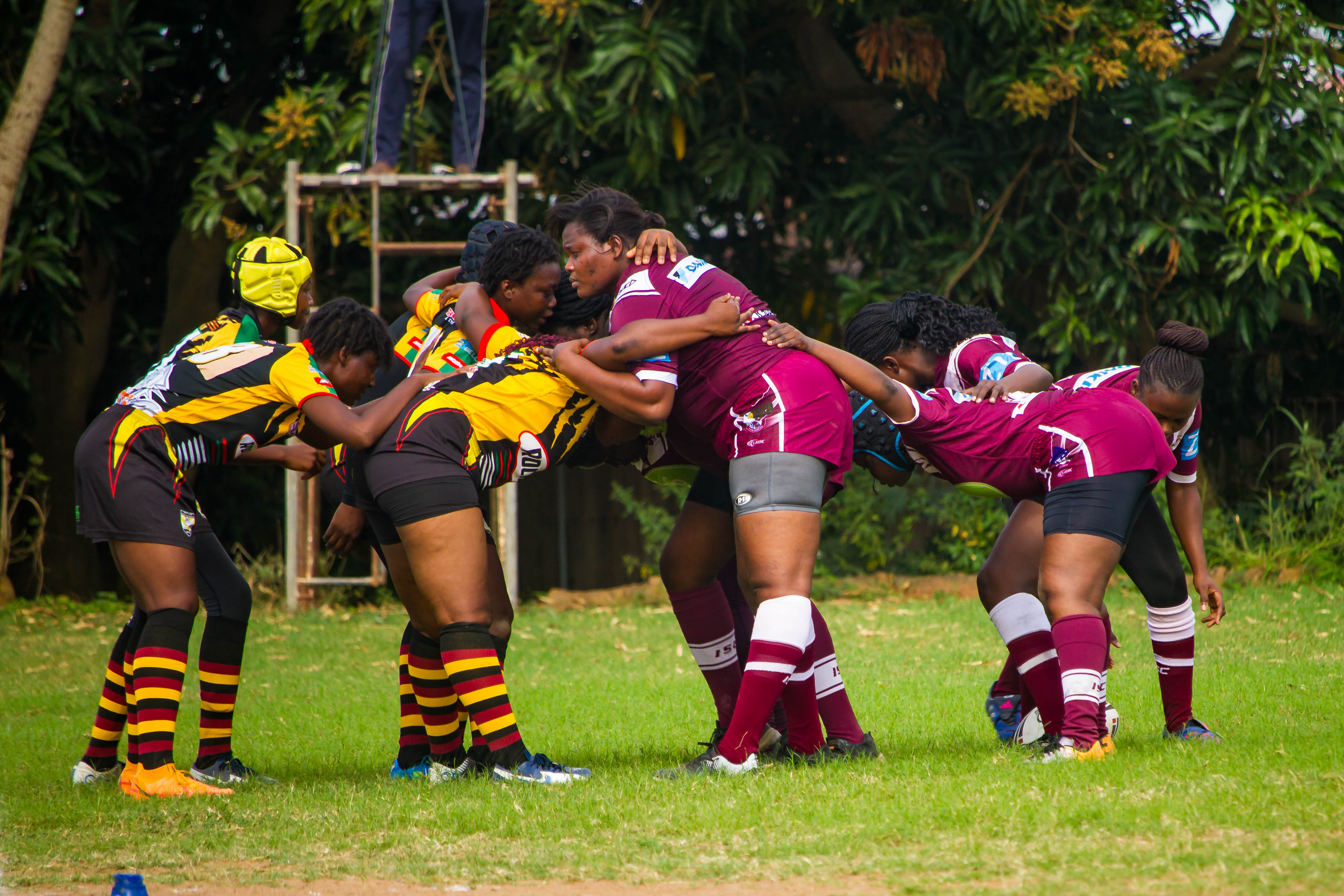

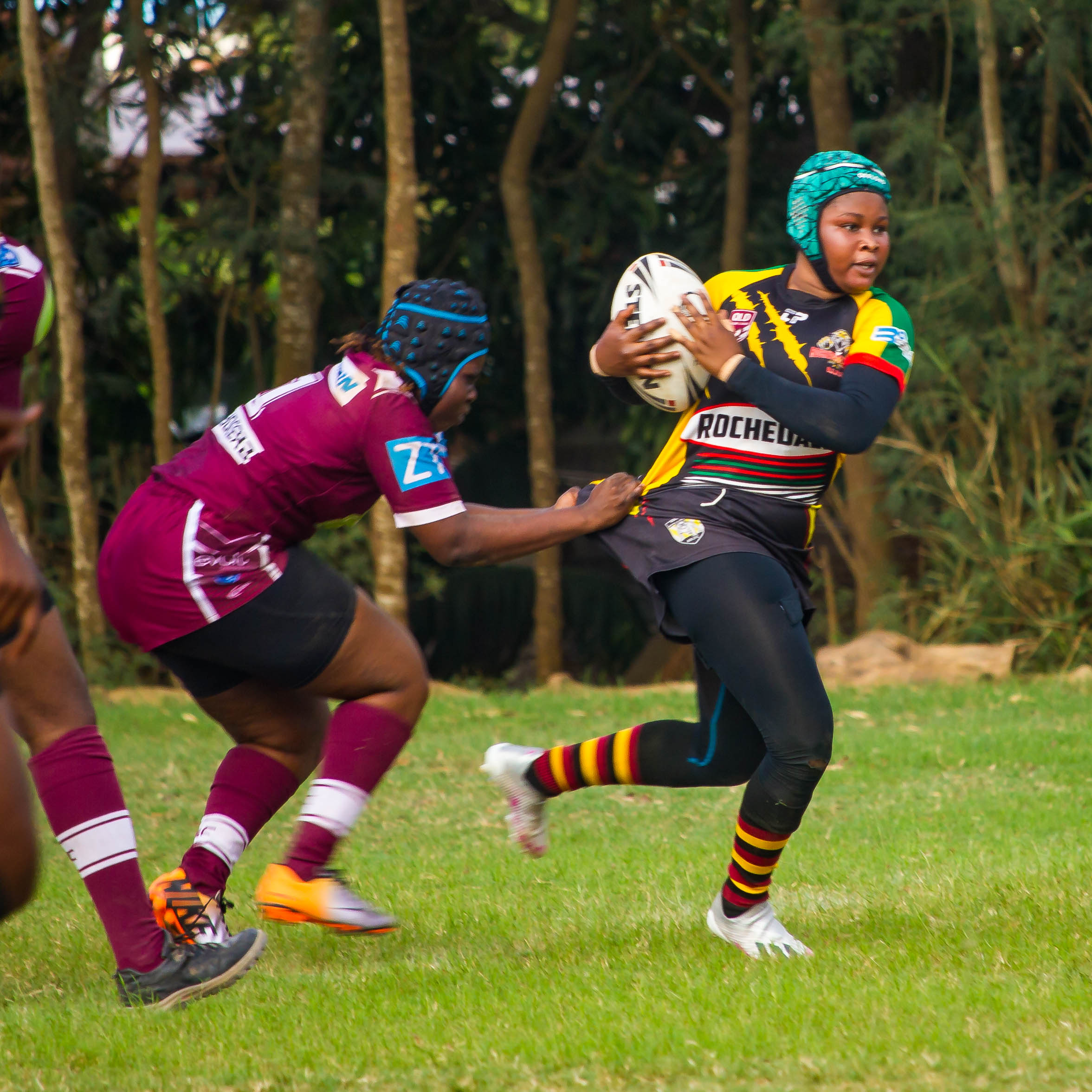

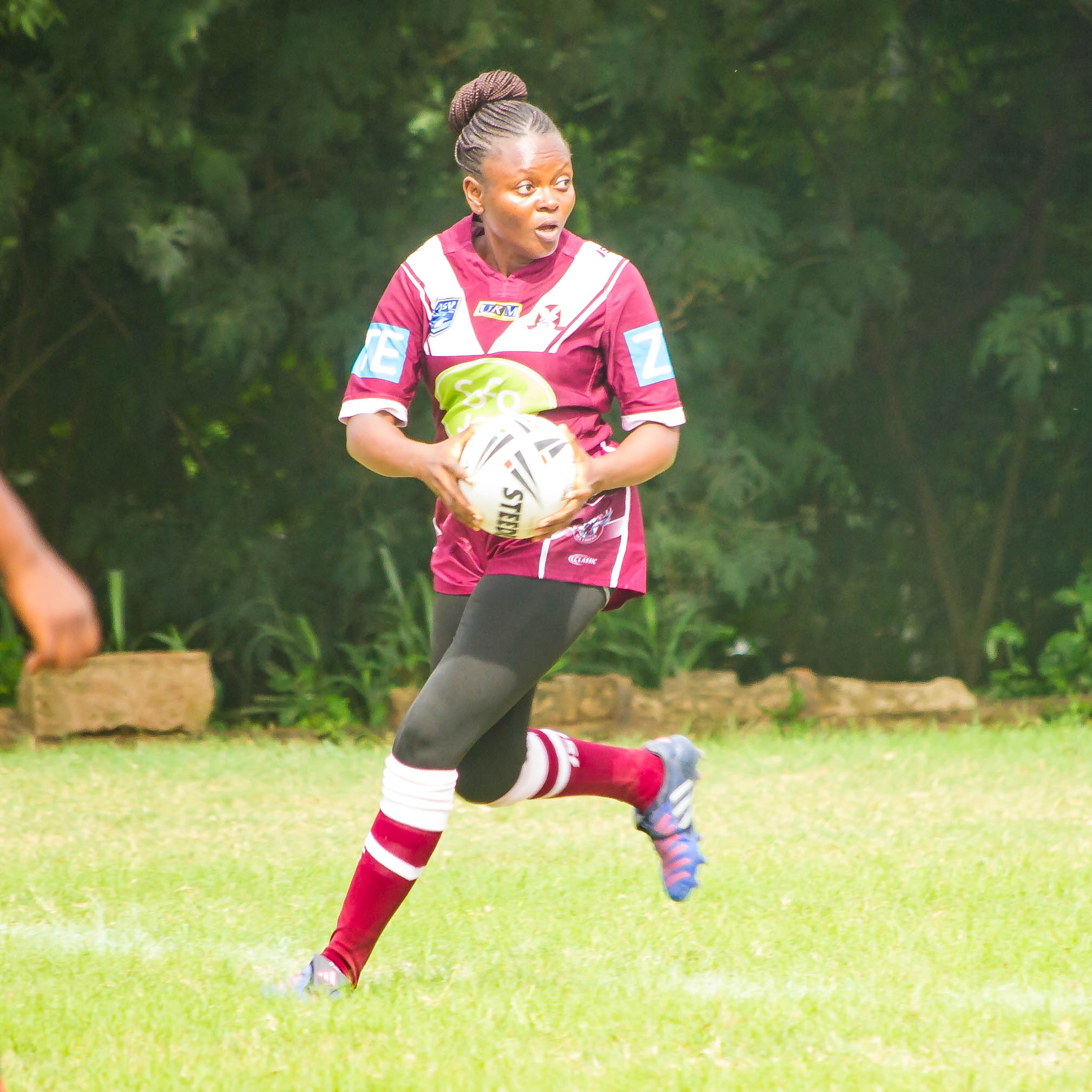

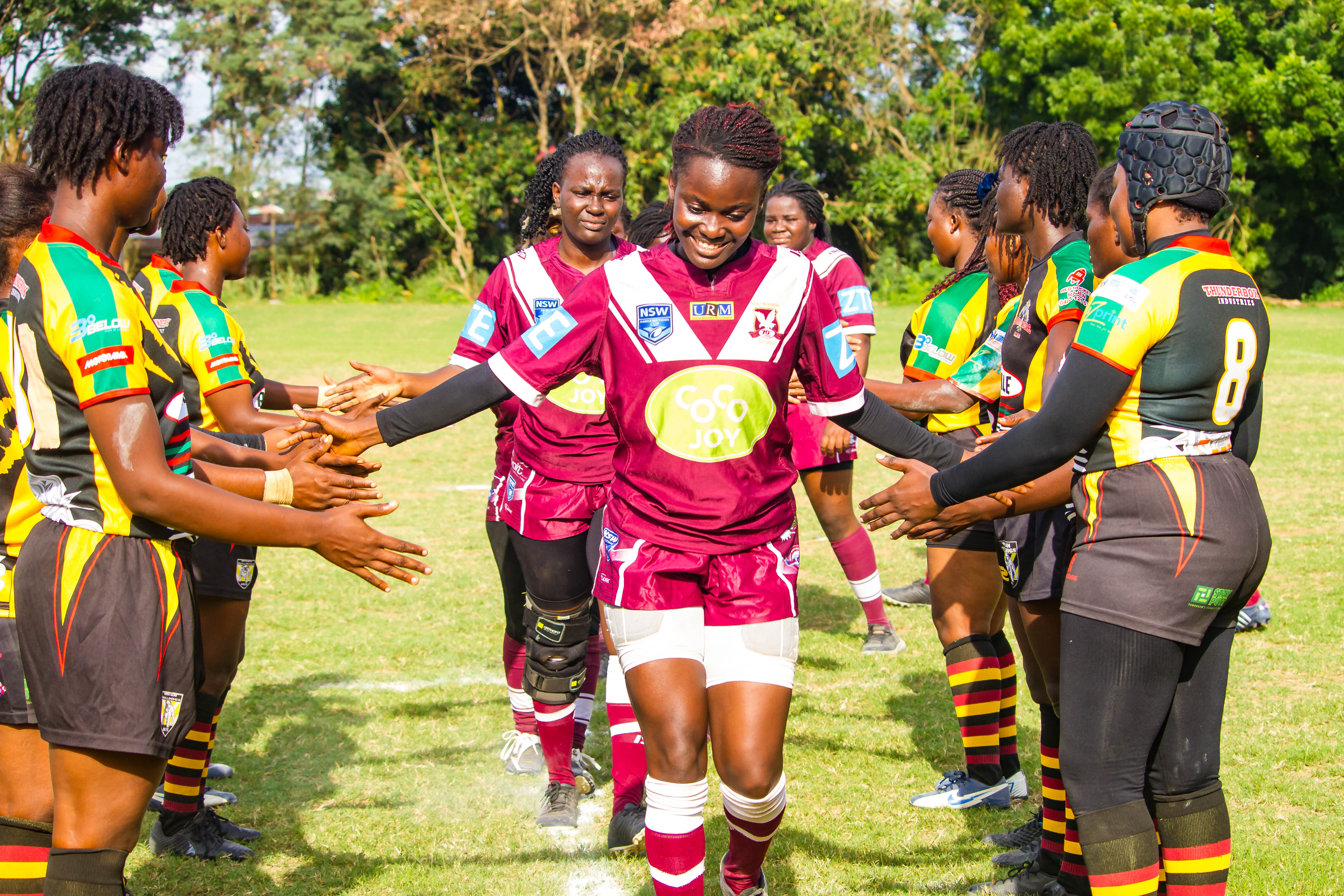

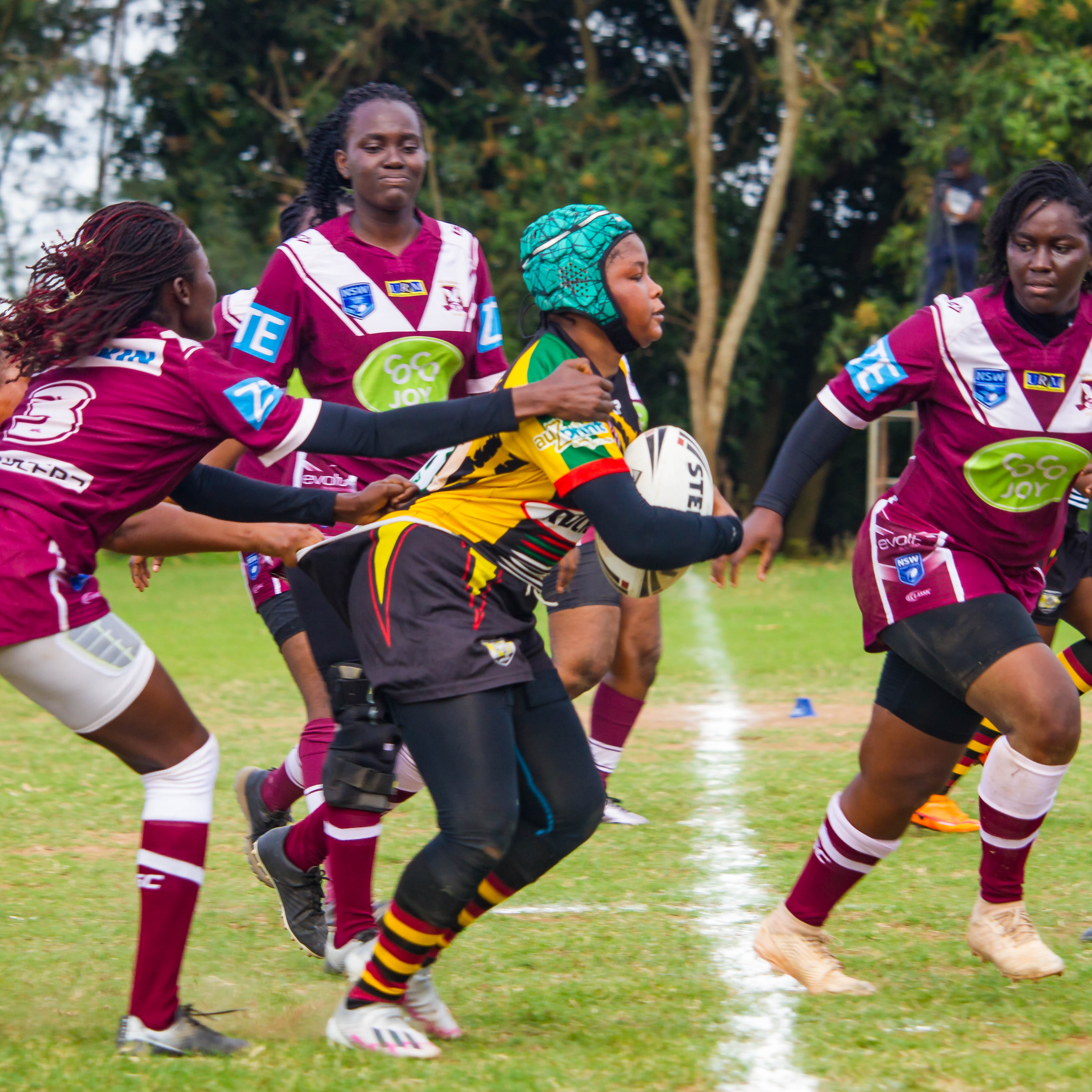

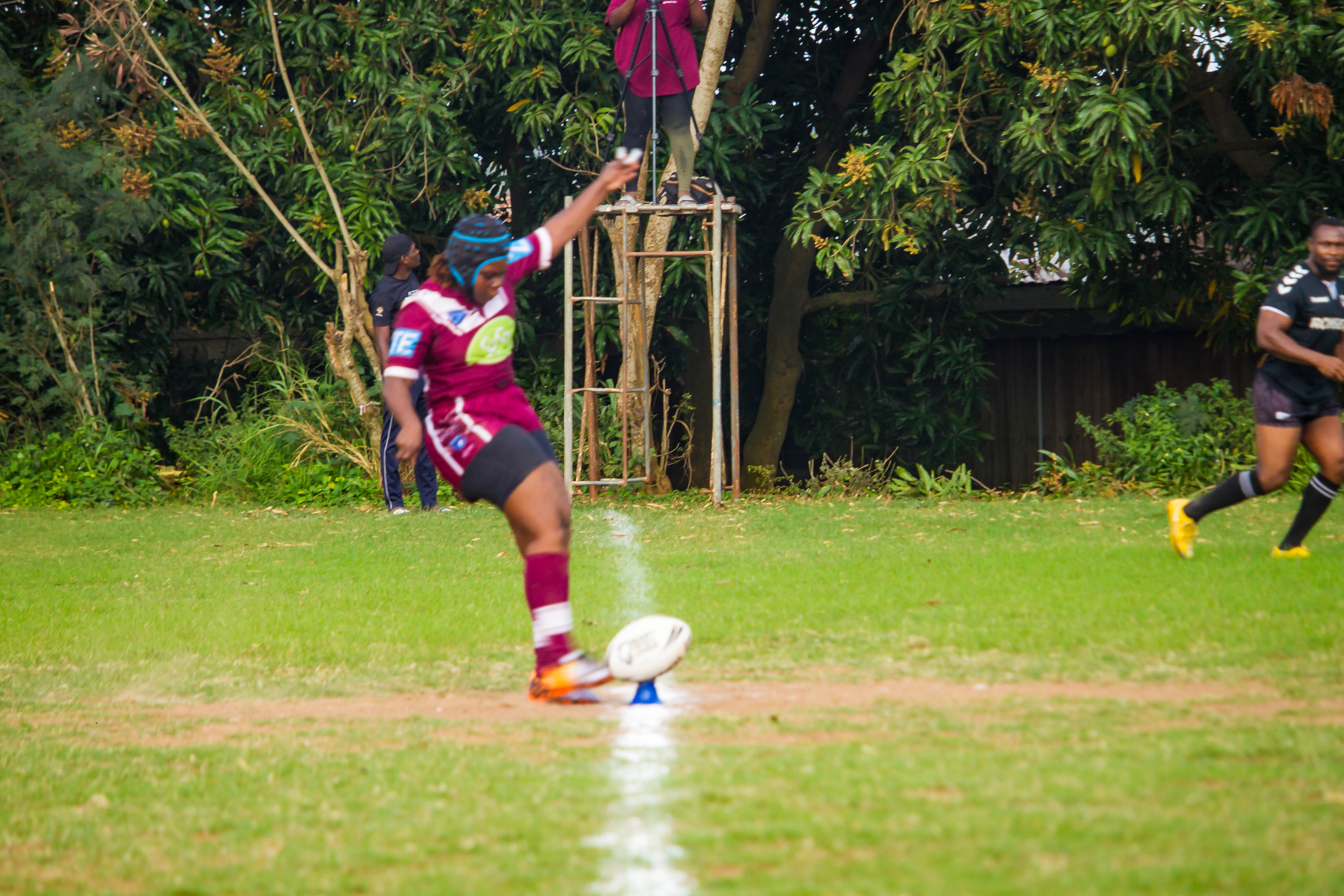

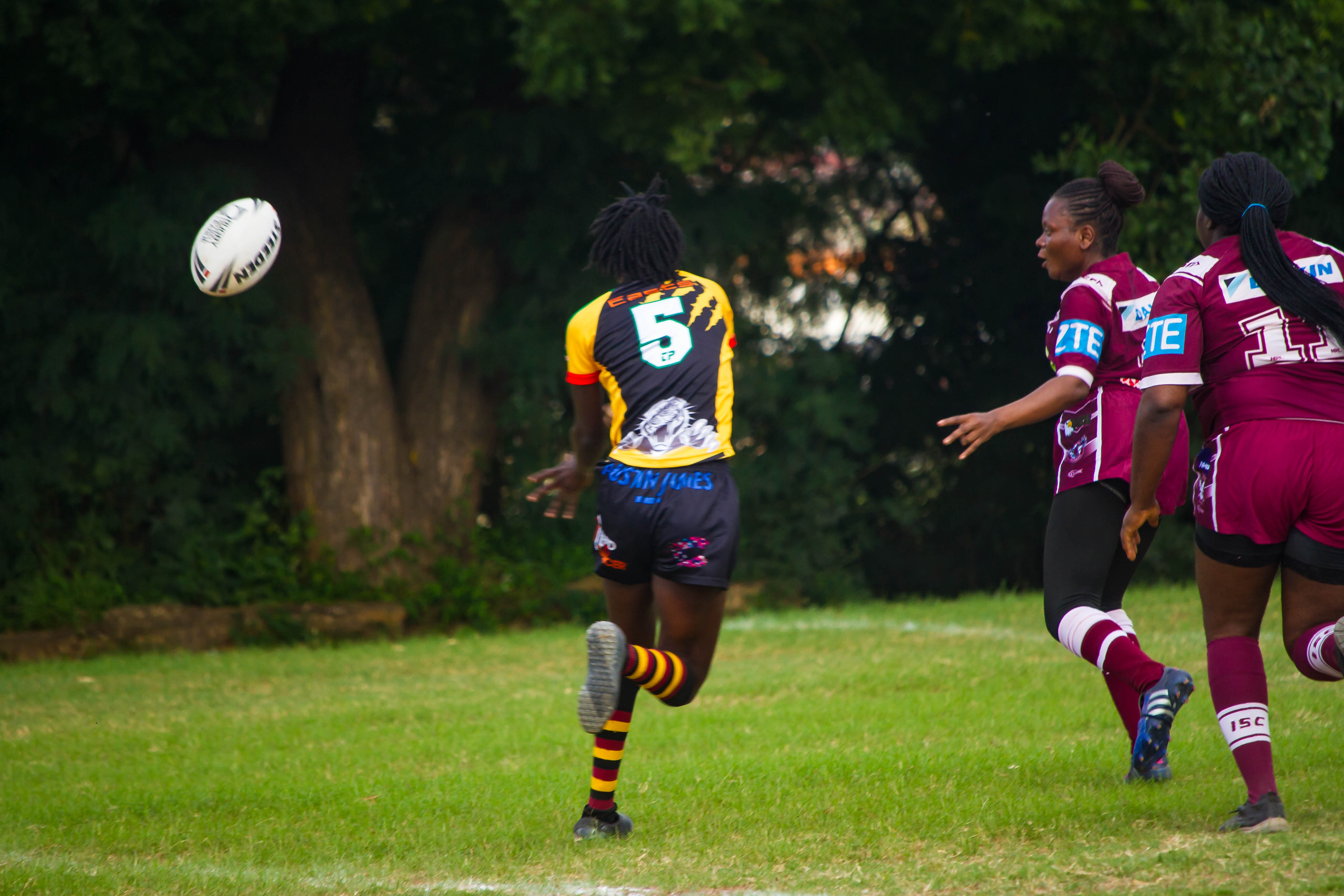

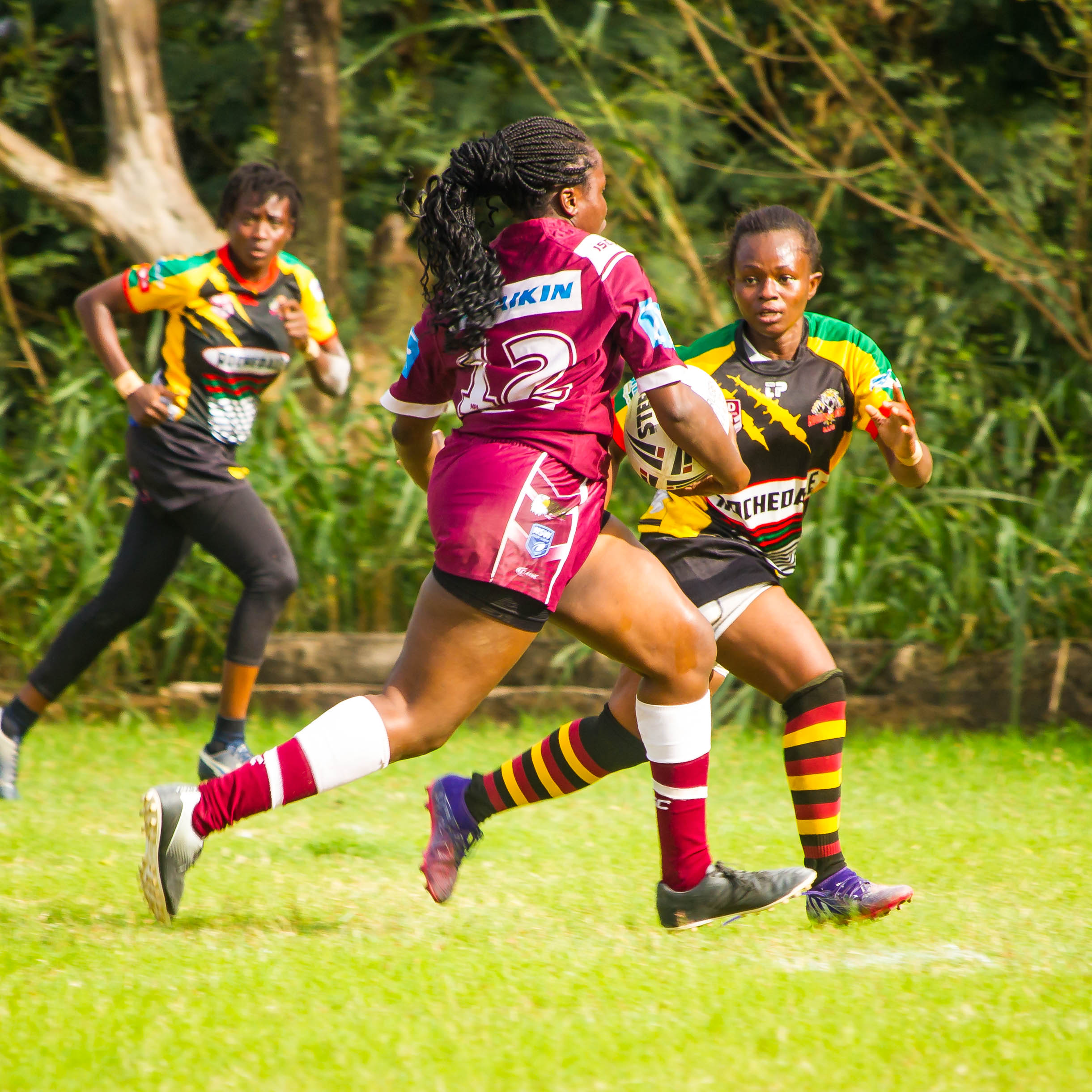

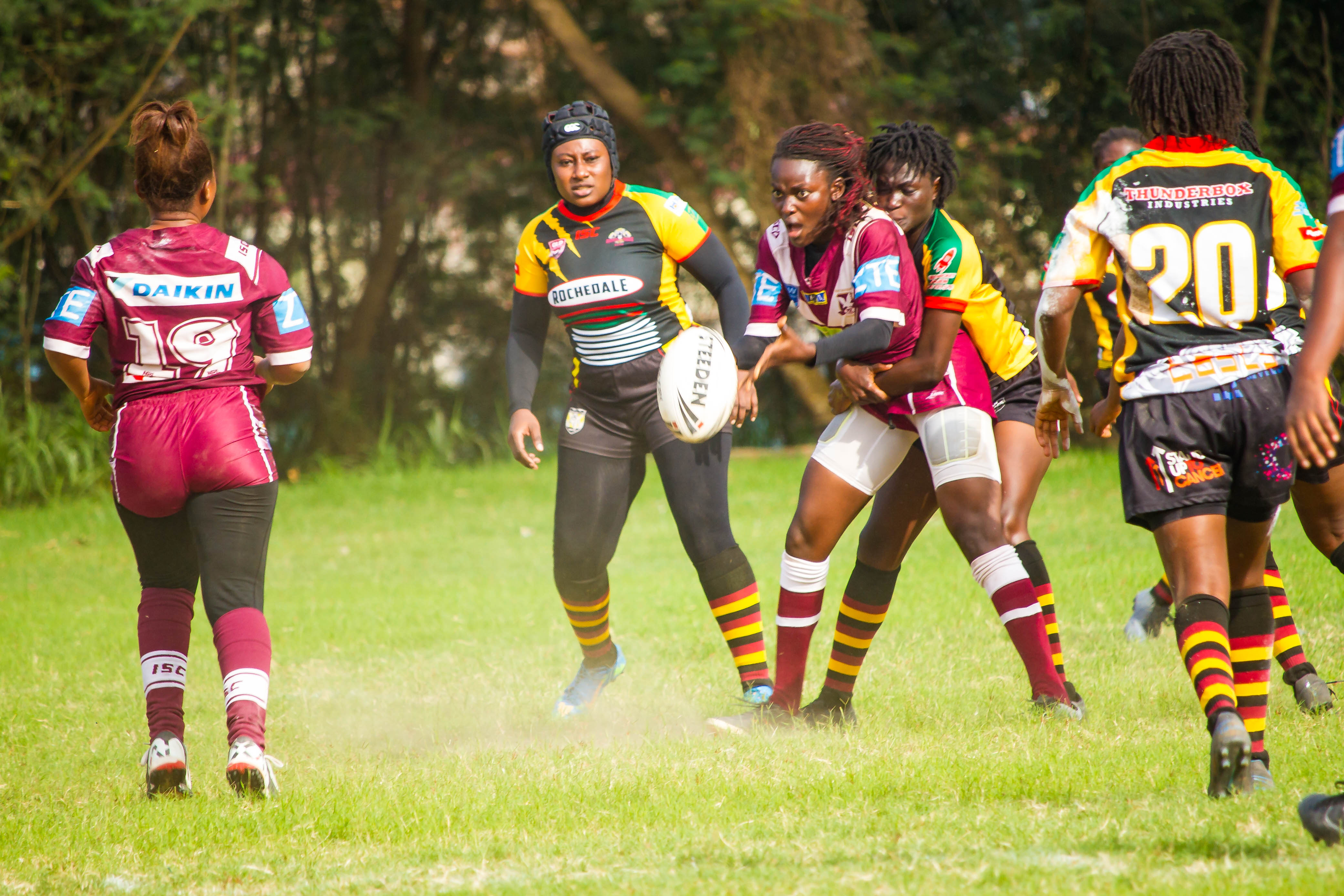

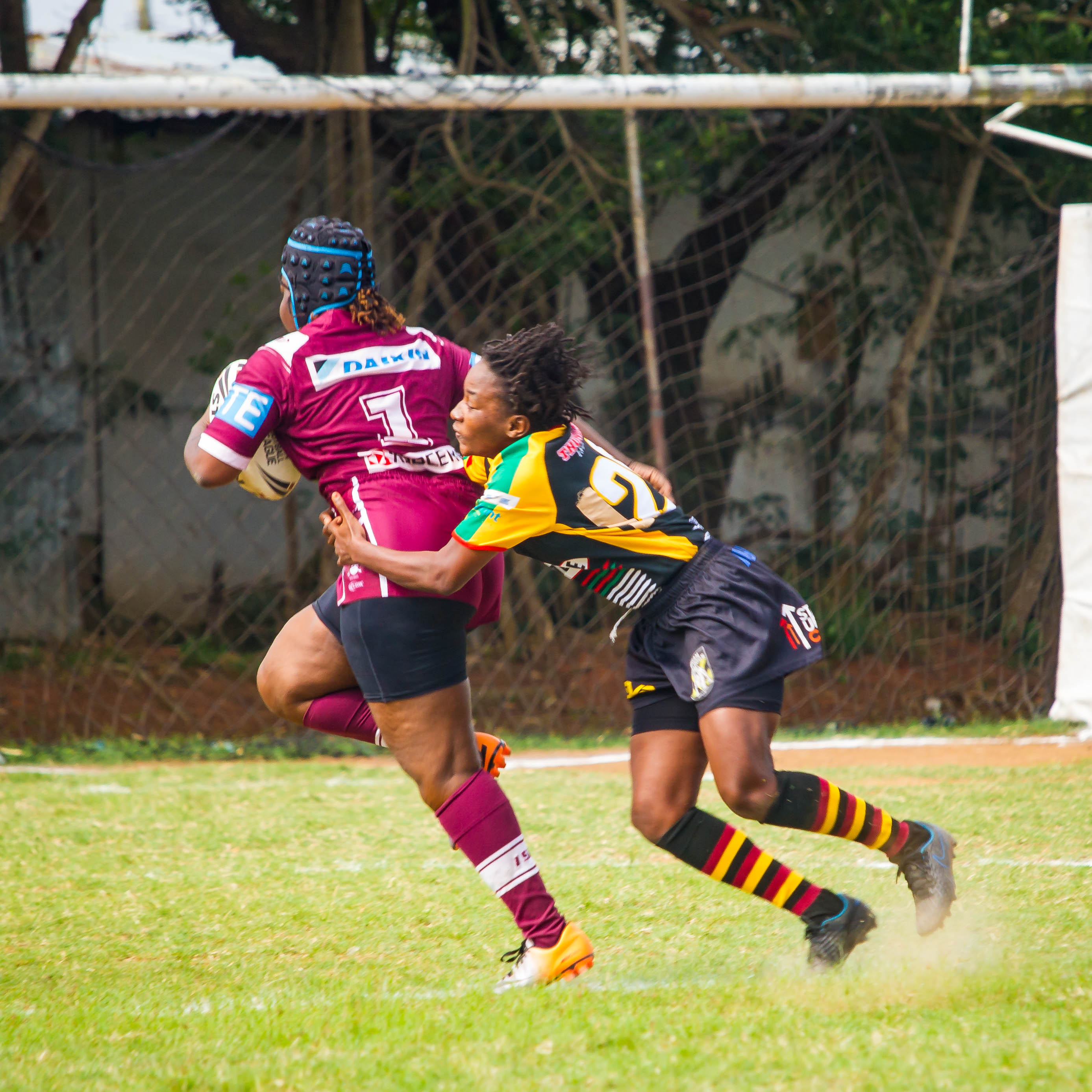

== See also ==
- Ghana national rugby league team
