= Ghana national rugby league team =

Sports team

Ghana

Team information
- Nickname: The Leopards
- Governing body: Rugby League Federation Ghana
- Region: Europe
- Head coach: Andy Gilvary
- Home stadium: University of Ghana Rugby Stadium
- IRL ranking: 33rd

Team results
- First international
- Ghana 12 – 23 Nigeria (Lagos, Nigeria; 2 October 2019)
- Biggest win
- Ghana 10 – 4 Cameroon (Lagos, Nigeria; 5 October 2019)
- Biggest defeat
- Ghana 12 – 23 Nigeria (Lagos, Nigeria; 2 October 2019)

The Ghana national rugby league team represents Ghana in the sport of rugby league.

Coming into existence in 2012, the Ghanaian Rugby League project was started up by the Rugby League European Federation (RLEF) and UK Sport International’s programme after Rugby League 9s were introduced as a Category 3 Sport by the Commonwealth Sports Committee.

== Squad ==
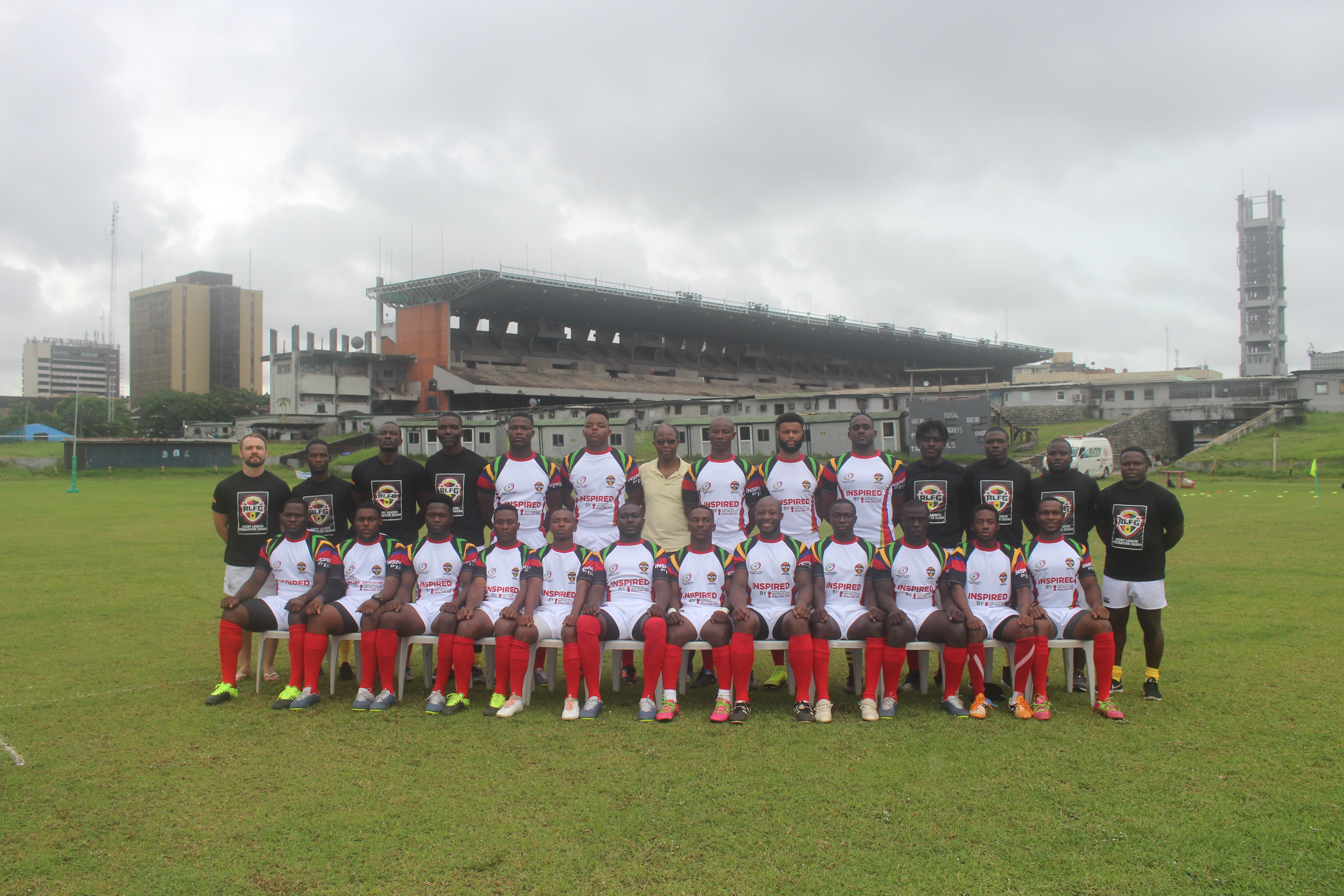
Squad for the 2019 MEA Rugby League Championship

Squad for the 2019 MEA Rugby League Championship;

- Marcus Alexander Amate Neil
- Albert Abeku Amonoo Nelson
- Benjamin Anane
- Collins Kweku Ofosu
- Desmond Atsu Geotrah
- Nigel Nii Ampim Sackey
- On Yelib Oliver Puman
- Reece Connor Rance
- Samuel A. Aboagye Sarpong
- Darryl Amoatey
- Nasiru Abdul Latif
- Eric Tettegah
- Philip Asomani
- John Bless Mensah
- Enoch Abam Niikoi
- Alibah Riddick Nana Abrokwa
- Isaac Jordan Annan
- Elikem Koesi Asafo
- Richard Amevor
- Chris Da Gama
- Michael Quaye
- William Pearce Biney
- Levi Osei

== Competitive record ==
=== Results ===
Win Draw Loss

Date	Home	Result	Away	Competition	Venue
2 October 2019	Nigeria	25–12	Ghana	2019 MEA Championship	(Nigeria) Teslim Balogun Stadium, Lagos
5 October 2019	Ghana	10–4	Cameroon	2019 MEA Championship	(Nigeria) Teslim Balogun Stadium, Lagos
27 September 2022	Ghana	26–6	Kenya	2022 MEA Championship	University of Ghana Rugby Stadium, Accra
1 October 2022	Ghana	4–30	Nigeria	2022 MEA Championship	University of Ghana Rugby Stadium, Accra
23 November 2025	Ghana	36–24	Nigeria	International	University of Ghana Rugby Stadium, Accra
30 November 2025	Ghana	28–16	Roots Rugby	Friendly	University of Ghana Rugby Stadium, Accra
12 July 2026	Ghana	4–12	University of Cambridge R.L.F.C.	Friendly	University of Ghana Rugby Stadium, Accra

== IRL Rankings ==
IRL Men's World Rankings
Official rankings as of August 2026
Rank	Change	Team	Pts %
1	Steady	Australia	100
2	Steady	New Zealand	82
3	Steady	England	70
4	Steady	Samoa	56
5	Steady	Tonga	54
6	Steady	Papua New Guinea	47
7	Steady	Fiji	34
8	▲1	Cook Islands	24
9	▲2	Netherlands	23
10	▲2	Ukraine	21
11	▼3	France	21
12	▼2	Serbia	20
13	Steady	Wales	18
14	Steady	Ireland	17
15	Steady	Greece	14
16	Steady	Malta	14
17	▲12	Canada	13
18	▼1	Italy	11
19	▼1	Jamaica	9
20	▲7	Scotland	8
21	▲1	United States	8
22	▼3	Poland	7
23	▼3	Lebanon	7
24	▼1	Germany	7
25	▼1	Czech Republic	6
26	▼5	Norway	6
27	▼2	Chile	5
28	▲2	Philippines	5
29	▼1	South Africa	4
30	Steady	Brazil	3
31	Steady	Morocco	3
32	▲1	Argentina	3
33	▲2	Ghana	2
34	▲2	Kenya	2
35	▼1	Montenegro	2
36	▲1	Nigeria	2
37	▼5	North Macedonia	1
38	Steady	Albania	1
39	Steady	Turkey	1
40	Steady	Bulgaria	1
41	Steady	Cameroon	0
42	Steady	Japan	0
43	Steady	Spain	0
44	Steady	Colombia	0
45	Steady	Russia	0
46	Steady	El Salvador	0
47	Steady	Bosnia and Herzegovina	0
48	Steady	Hong Kong	0
49	Steady	Solomon Islands	0
50	Steady	Vanuatu	0
51	Steady	Hungary	0
52	Steady	Latvia	0
53	Steady	Denmark	0
54	Steady	Belgium	0
55	Steady	Estonia	0
56	Steady	Sweden	0
57	Steady	Niue	0
Complete rankings at www.internationalrugbyleague.com
