= Nigeria national rugby league team =

Nigeria

Team information
- Governing body: Nigeria Rugby League
- Region: Middle East-Africa
- Captain: Sadiq Adebiyi
- Home stadium: Teslim Balogun Stadium
- IRL ranking: 36th

Team results
- First international
- Nigeria 23 – 12 Ghana (Lagos, Nigeria; 2 October 2019)
- Biggest win
- Nigeria 36 – 2 Cameroon (Lagos, Nigeria; 28 September 2022)

The Nigeria national rugby league team represents Nigeria in international rugby league football competitions. They made their debut in the 2019 Middle East Africa Championship with a 23-12 victory over Ghana.

== Current squad ==
Squad for 2019 MEA Rugby League Championship;

- Bolu Fagborun
- Jude Abrackson
- Joshua Effiong
- Gabriel John
- Alex Richard
- Samuel Akpabio
- Nuhu Ibrahim
- Shakirudeen Alameen
- Nelson Celestine
- Habib Isazka
- Steven James
- Temitope Olawale
- Kiki Stephen
- Precious John
- Kelvin Azuka
- David Olwale
- Sulymon Oyebola
- Stephen Akpawan
- Malu Williams
- Sadiq Adebiyi
- Jubril Olajude
- Isah Lawal-Saulawa

== Competitive record ==
=== Results ===
Win Draw Loss

Date	Home	Result	Away	Competition	Venue	Crowd
2 October 2019	Nigeria	25–12	Ghana	2019 MEA Championship	(Nigeria) Teslim Balogun Stadium, Lagos	
5 October 2019	Nigeria	38–10	Morocco	2019 MEA Championship	(Nigeria) Teslim Balogun Stadium, Lagos	
28 September 2022	Nigeria	36–2	Cameroon	2022 MEA Championship	University of Ghana stadium, Legon Accra	
4 October 2022	Ghana	4–30	Nigeria	2022 MEA Championship	University of Ghana stadium, Legon Accra	
2 November 2025	Cumbria	70–6	Nigeria	Friendly	(Cumbria) Craven Park, Barrow-in-Furness	
23 November 2025	Ghana	36–24	Nigeria	International	University of Ghana stadium, Legon Accra	

== IRL Rankings ==
IRL Men's World Rankings
Official rankings as of August 2026
Rank	Change	Team	Pts %
1	Steady	Australia	100
2	Steady	New Zealand	82
3	Steady	England	70
4	Steady	Samoa	56
5	Steady	Tonga	54
6	Steady	Papua New Guinea	47
7	Steady	Fiji	34
8	▲1	Cook Islands	24
9	▲2	Netherlands	23
10	▲2	Ukraine	21
11	▼3	France	21
12	▼2	Serbia	20
13	Steady	Wales	18
14	Steady	Ireland	17
15	Steady	Greece	14
16	Steady	Malta	14
17	▲12	Canada	13
18	▼1	Italy	11
19	▼1	Jamaica	9
20	▲7	Scotland	8
21	▲1	United States	8
22	▼3	Poland	7
23	▼3	Lebanon	7
24	▼1	Germany	7
25	▼1	Czech Republic	6
26	▼5	Norway	6
27	▼2	Chile	5
28	▲2	Philippines	5
29	▼1	South Africa	4
30	Steady	Brazil	3
31	Steady	Morocco	3
32	▲1	Argentina	3
33	▲2	Ghana	2
34	▲2	Kenya	2
35	▼1	Montenegro	2
36	▲1	Nigeria	2
37	▼5	North Macedonia	1
38	Steady	Albania	1
39	Steady	Turkey	1
40	Steady	Bulgaria	1
41	Steady	Cameroon	0
42	Steady	Japan	0
43	Steady	Spain	0
44	Steady	Colombia	0
45	Steady	Russia	0
46	Steady	El Salvador	0
47	Steady	Bosnia and Herzegovina	0
48	Steady	Hong Kong	0
49	Steady	Solomon Islands	0
50	Steady	Vanuatu	0
51	Steady	Hungary	0
52	Steady	Latvia	0
53	Steady	Denmark	0
54	Steady	Belgium	0
55	Steady	Estonia	0
56	Steady	Sweden	0
57	Steady	Niue	0
Complete rankings at www.internationalrugbyleague.com

== See also ==
- Nigeria Rugby League
- Rugby league in Africa
