= Nigeria Rugby League =

Governing sport body in Nigeria

- Founded: 2018
- IRL affiliation: 2018
- Responsibility: Rugby League in Nigeria
- Headquarters: Lagos, Nigeria
- Key people: Adam Davison Micheal Ogunbiyi Chikezi Dozie Martin Crawford Paul Hogan Oluwasegun Benson Abiodun Olawale-Cole (Chair)
- Website: www.NigeriaRugbyLeague.org

(Nigeria)

The Nigeria Rugby League is the governing body of the sport of rugby league football in Nigeria.

== History ==
The Nigeria Rugby League Association were first founded in 2018 by former professional rugby league footballer, Ade Adebisi who is the Vice President and General Manager and chairman Abiodun Olawale-Cole. Nigeria Rugby League were granted observer membership of the Rugby League European Federation, replacing the old inactive and defunct Nigerian Rugby League governing body.

== National League ==
The inaugural season will be contested in 2019 with a number of clubs having partnerships with professional Super League clubs.

== MEA Championship Lagos Nigeria 2019 (Host - Nigeria) ==
Nigeria’s Green Hawks beat Morocco to win the 2019 Middle East Africa (MEA) Championship on Saturday 5 October at the TBS Cricket Oval in Lagos.The Green Hawks cheered by a boisterous home crowd and watched by the chair of Rugby League International Federation (RLIF) Graeme Thompson, proved too strong for the North Africans as they triumphed 38-10 in what was only their second game on the international Rugby League scene. They had defeated West African rivals Ghana on their international Rugby League debut on Wednesday to make the finals while the Atlas Lions of Morocco beat Cameroon on their way to the final.

In the third place encounter between Ghana and Cameroon, it was Ghana who carried the day with a 10-4 victory over Cameroon who finished the championship without a win.

https://www.busybuddiesng.com/2019-mea-championship-nigeria-beat-morocco-to-win-title/

== Teams ==
=== Northern Conference ===
- Jos Miner
- Kano Gazelles
- Kano Lions
- Kano Redstar
- Zazzau Bulls

=== South West Conference ===
- Eko Trinity
- Lagos Broncos
- Lagos Haven
- Lagos Kings
- Lagos Rhinos

== See also ==
- Nigeria national rugby league team
