= Teslim Balogun Stadium =

Stadium in Lagos, Nigeria

Coordinates: 6°29′58″N 3°21′39″E

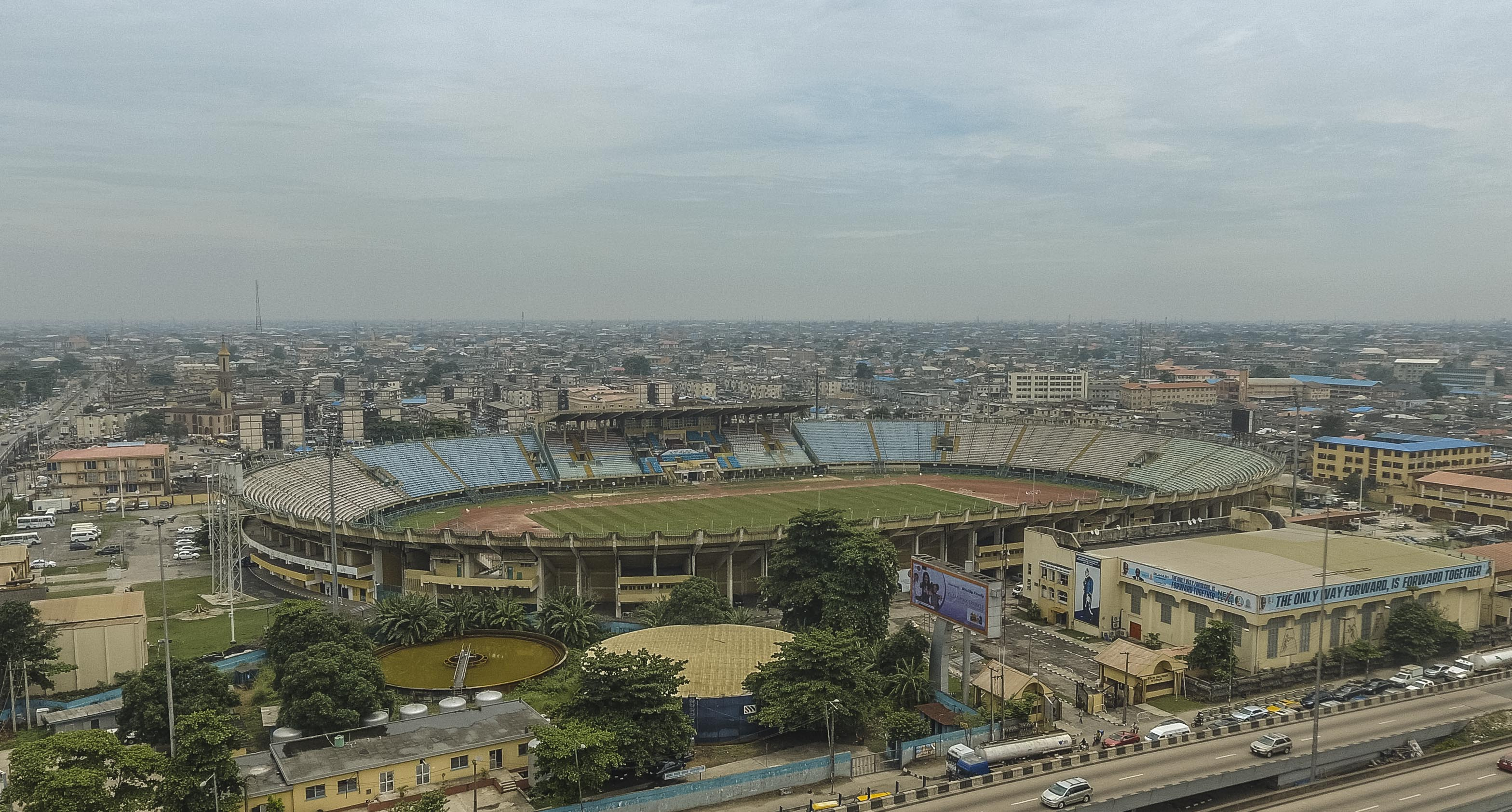
- Aerial view of the stadium
- Interactive map of Teslim Balogun Stadium
- Full name: Teslim Balogun Stadium
- Location: Lagos
- Capacity: 24,325
- Surface: Grass

Construction
- Opened: 1984
- Architects: SPartner (Germany)chlaich Bergermann &

Tenants
- Nigeria national football team Vandrezzer FC; 1472 F.C.

The Teslim Balogun Stadium is a multi-use stadium in Surulere, Lagos, Nigeria. It is used mostly for football matches and serves as a home ground of First Bank FC. The Nigeria national rugby league team also uses the venue. The stadium has a capacity of 24,325 people, and is sometimes used for international football matches. It once served as the venue for the Nigerian Cup final, just before it hosted some matches in the 2009 FIFA U-17 World Cup youth tournament held in Nigeria. It sits adjacent to the Lagos National Stadium.

== Overview ==
It is named after Nigerian former professional footballer Teslim Balogun.

Started in 1984 under the administration of military governor Gbolahan Mudasiru, construction continually stalled under military regimes and the stadium became a white elephant. By the time the stadium was completed in 2007, it had taken 23 years and cost over N1.3 billion.

As recently as 2006, it was occupied by homeless people and area boys.

The first sporting event held in the stadium was the 18th Mobil Track and Field Athletics Championship on 17 May. The first football game was an international friendly on 28 May between Enyimba and Asante Kotoko. The stadium also hosted the Nigeria Premier League Super Four playoff that season and the Nigerian FA Cup final in 2007. The final of the 2009 Federation Cup between Enyimba and Sharks was held at the stadium.

Lagos State Commissioner for Youth Sports and Social Development, Prince Ademola Adeniji-Adele disclosed at the FIFA Media Briefing Room of the Teslim Balogun Stadium on 18 May 2009 on the preparations for FIFA U-17 World Cup that "with a FIFA Star Two artificial turf, FIFA Grade seats with back rest, a seating capacity of 24,325, a 70 kVA electricity generating set for the digital scoreboard, state of art changing room for athletes and officials, security gadgets with CCTV cameras, a 1,000 kVA and 500 kVA generating sets and other standard facilities, I know we are set to host a successful championship."

The Teslim Balogun stadium was also the main venue of the 18th National Sports festival in December 2012.

With 114 gold, 99 silver, and 75 bronze medals, Delta took the top spot on the medal stand and emerge winners of the 18th National sport Festival.

In 2018, during the Nigerian Independence day (1 October 2018); The Crawford Age grade competition was held at the Olympic Standard swimming pool of the stadium.

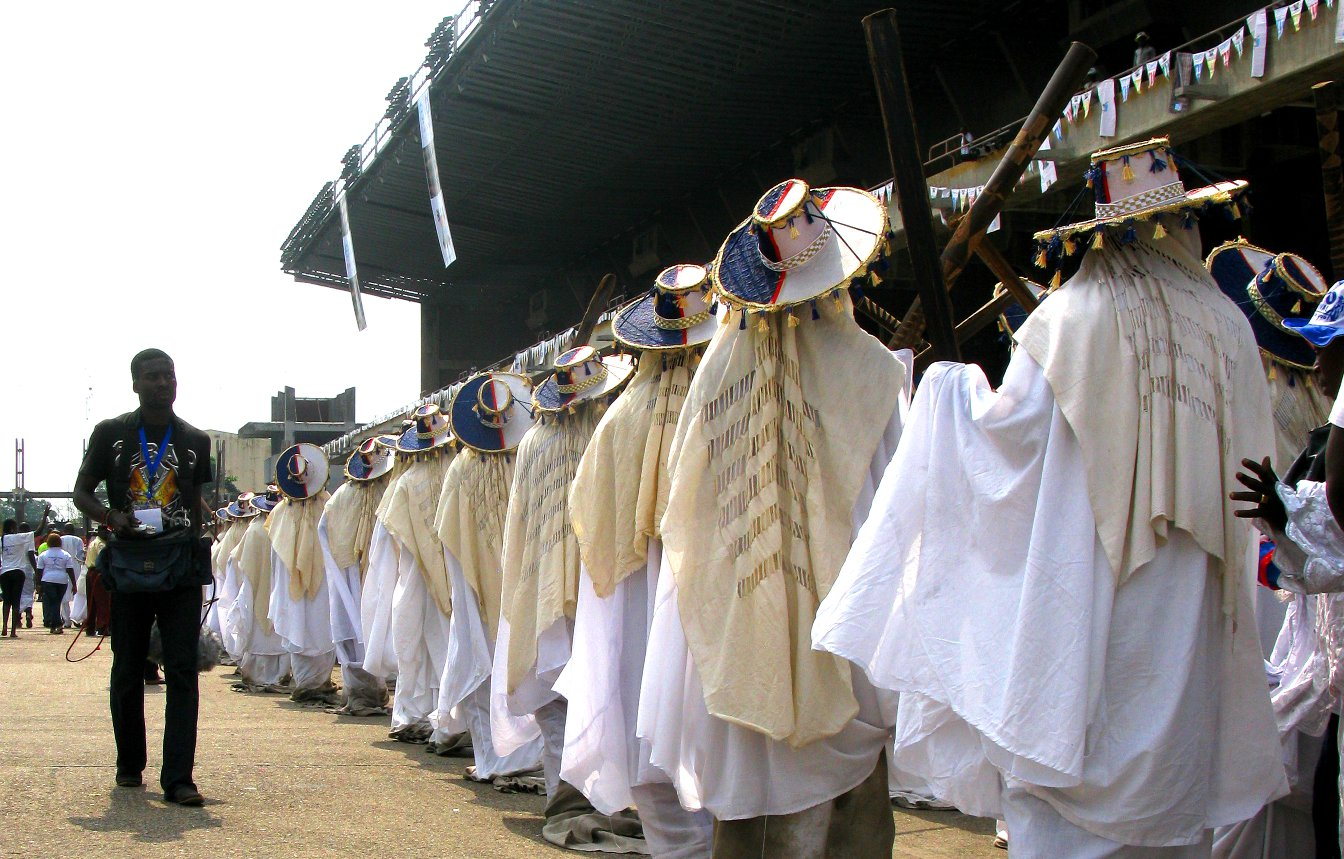
Eyo Festival, Teslim Balogun Stadium, 2011

== Architecture ==
The stadium was designed by Nigerian Architect Onafowokan Michael Olutusen in 1981, construction commenced and there was a halt in the process following political instabilities. The Stadium was later brought to full construction status by Nigerian Architect O.C. Majoroh of Majoroh Partnership in 2007.

The stadium design utilizes principles of sustainable architecture, carefully infusing elements of green architecture in the design, the ratio of softscape to hardscape is 70:30. The site plan is a complete mix of Architecture and planning, considering the stiff nature of the site and its constraints of size the architecture of the stadium was carefully conceptualized to put into consideration every aspect of design. Adjoining facilities like the pool and other sporting courts where positioned to suit the overall outlook of the stadium. Car parking areas are not devoid of green elements. Spaces are provided for VIPs, Sportsmen and workers the general public has no parking space due to the nature of the facilities and to reduce congestion from the northern and western road networks of the stadium.

The stadium incorporates an architectural style of tropical modernism, a style of architecture where the climate is a major consideration, this can be seen in the careful incorporation of terraces to support airflow and cross ventilate indoor spaces in the stadium thereby improving air quality of indoor spaces.

Between 2023 and 2024, the facade of the Teslim Balogun stadium was redesigned in a Modern Contemporary Architectural style, the use of ACM panels with multi coloured panels at the bottom of the panelled surface spread evenly round about gives the stadium a new look. The roof members are suspended on steel trusses, to prevent the viewers from adverse weather effects like rain during the use of the facility.

== Notable football matches ==
=== 2009 FIFA U-17 World Cup ===
Date	Team 1	Result	Team 2	Attendance	Round
24 October 2009	Mexico	0–2	Switzerland	9,870	Group B
24 October 2009	Brazil	3–2	Japan	15,254	Group B
27 October 2009	Switzerland	4–3	Japan	9,920	Group B
27 October 2009	Brazil	0–1	Mexico	21,115	Group B
30 October 2009	Japan	0–2	Mexico	17,105	Group B
4 November 2009	Switzerland	4–3 (a.e.t.)	Germany	15,515	Round of 16
12 November 2009	Colombia	0–4	Switzerland	18,011	Semi-finals
12 November 2009	Spain	1–3	Nigeria	24,000	Semi-finals
