= Morocco national rugby league team =

Morocco

Team information
- Nickname: Maroc
- Governing body: Fédération Marocaine de Rugby League
- Region: Europe
- Head coach: Jerome Alonso
- IRL ranking: 31st

Uniforms
First colours

Team results
- First international
- Moldova 24–19 Morocco (18 October 1995)
- Biggest win
- Morocco 58–4 Serbia (25 October 2003)
- Biggest defeat
- Morocco 0–104 Lebanon (Perpignan, France; 1999)

The Morocco national rugby league team has been participating in international competition since 1995. Many players for the Moroccan team are drawn from the French competition.

Morocco has participated in the World Sevens (1995), Superleague World Nines (1996), Emerging Nations Tournament (1995, 2000) and Mediterranean Cup (since 2003) competitions. In 2009 Morocco won the RLEF Euro Med Challenge.

== Current squad ==
Squad for match against France on 22 February 2025:

- Mouadh Bida (Avignon)
- Hakim Ed Dermoune (Avignon)
- Zakaria Hammouch (Avignon)
- Ayoub Mesyani (Avignon)
- Anas Naji (Avignon)
- Adam Ed-Diche (Ferals)
- Kais Lafifi (Palau)
- Yannis Hamri (Salon de Provence)
- Yassin Nidouarab (Salon de Provence)
- Yliass Lamarti (Toulouse)
- Yassin Messaoudi (Toulouse)
- Yassine Al Gannfoufi (Villefranche)
- Yannis Ahcini (Villegailhenc)
- Yanis Hettat (Villegailhenc)
- Hamza Bachoukh (Villeneuve)
- Houcine Fakir (Villeneuve)
- Sofiane Hemissi (Villeneuve)
- Abdelaziz Damen (XIII Catalan)

== Competitive record ==
=== Overall ===
Team	First Played	Played	Win	Draw	Loss	Points For	Points Against
Belgium	2009	1	1	0	0	46	12
Cameroon	2019	1	1	0	0	8	4
Catalonia	2008	2	2	0	0	91	18
France	1999	4	0	0	4	24	232
Ireland	1995	1	0	0	1	6	42
Italy	1999	2	1	0	1	32	44
Japan	2000	1	1	0	0	12	8
Lebanon	1999	5	0	0	6	44	392
Moldova	1995	1	0	0	1	19	24
Nigeria	2019	1	0	0	1	10	38
Serbia	2003	3	2	1	0	122	30
United States	2000	1	0	0	1	10	50
Total		25	8	1	16	426	954

=== Results ===
- Moldova def. Morocco 24–19 (18 October 1995)
- Ireland def. Morocco 42–6 (20 October 1995)
- France def. Morocco 80–8 (11 November 1999)
- Italy def. Morocco 34–0 (14 November 1999)
- Lebanon def. Morocco 104–0 (17 November 1999)
- Morocco def. Japan 12–8 (15 November 2000)
- USA def. Morocco 50–10 (20 November 2000)
- France def. Morocco 72–0 (19 October 2003)
- Lebanon def. Morocco 60–0 (22 October 2003)
- Morocco def. Serbia 58–4 (25 October 2003)
- France def. Morocco 46–6 (2 October 2004)
- Lebanon def. Morocco 48–14 (5 October 2004)
- Morocco drew with Serbia 20–20 (9 October 2004)
- Morocco def. Serbia 44–6 (23 February 2008)
- Morocco def. Catalonia 62–12 (21 June 2008)
- Morocco def. Italy 32–10 (6 June 2009)
- Morocco def. Catalonia 29–6 (4 July 2009)
- Morocco def. Belgium 46–12 (15 August 2009)
- Lebanon def. Morocco 72–4 (28 June 2011)
- Lebanon def. Morocco 78–0 (2 July 2011)
- Lebanon def. Morocco 30–26 (12 October 2012)
- Morocco def. Cameroon 8-4 (2 October 2019)
- Nigeria def. Morocco 38–10 (5 October 2019)
- France def. Morocco 34–10 (22 February 2025)

== IRL Rankings ==
IRL Men's World Rankings
Official rankings as of December 2025
Rank	Change	Team	Pts %
1	Steady	Australia	100
2	Steady	New Zealand	82
3	Steady	England	74
4	Steady	Samoa	56
5	Steady	Tonga	54
6	Steady	Papua New Guinea	47
7	Steady	Fiji	34
8	Steady	France	24
9	Steady	Cook Islands	24
10	Steady	Serbia	23
11	Steady	Netherlands	22
12	Steady	Ukraine	21
13	Steady	Wales	18
14	Steady	Ireland	17
15	Steady	Greece	15
16	Steady	Malta	15
17	Steady	Italy	11
18	Steady	Jamaica	9
19	▲1	Poland	7
20	▲1	Lebanon	7
21	▲1	Norway	7
22	▼3	United States	7
23	Steady	Germany	7
24	Steady	Czech Republic	6
25	Steady	Chile	6
26	▲1	Philippines	5
27	▲1	Scotland	5
28	▼2	South Africa	5
29	▲1	Canada	5
30	▼1	Brazil	3
31	▲1	Morocco	3
32	▲1	North Macedonia	3
33	▲1	Argentina	3
34	▲1	Montenegro	3
35	▲4	Ghana	2
36	▼5	Kenya	2
37	▲3	Nigeria	2
38	▼2	Albania	1
39	▼2	Turkey	1
40	▼2	Bulgaria	1
41	▲1	Cameroon	0
42	▲1	Japan	0
43	▲1	Spain	0
44	▼3	Colombia	0
45	Steady	Russia	0
46	Steady	El Salvador	0
47	Steady	Bosnia and Herzegovina	0
48	Steady	Hong Kong	0
49	Steady	Solomon Islands	0
50	Steady	Vanuatu	0
51	Steady	Hungary	0
52	Steady	Latvia	0
53	Steady	Denmark	0
54	Steady	Belgium	0
55	Steady	Estonia	0
56	Steady	Sweden	0
57	Steady	Niue	0
Complete rankings at www.internationalrugbyleague.com

== See also ==
- Rugby league in Africa
