= List of rugby league competitions =

The following is a list of rugby league competitions that are still currently in existence. This includes both international tournaments played by national Test teams and also domestic club and provincial competitions. Throughout the list bold indicates the league is a professional or semi-professional competition.

== International tournaments ==
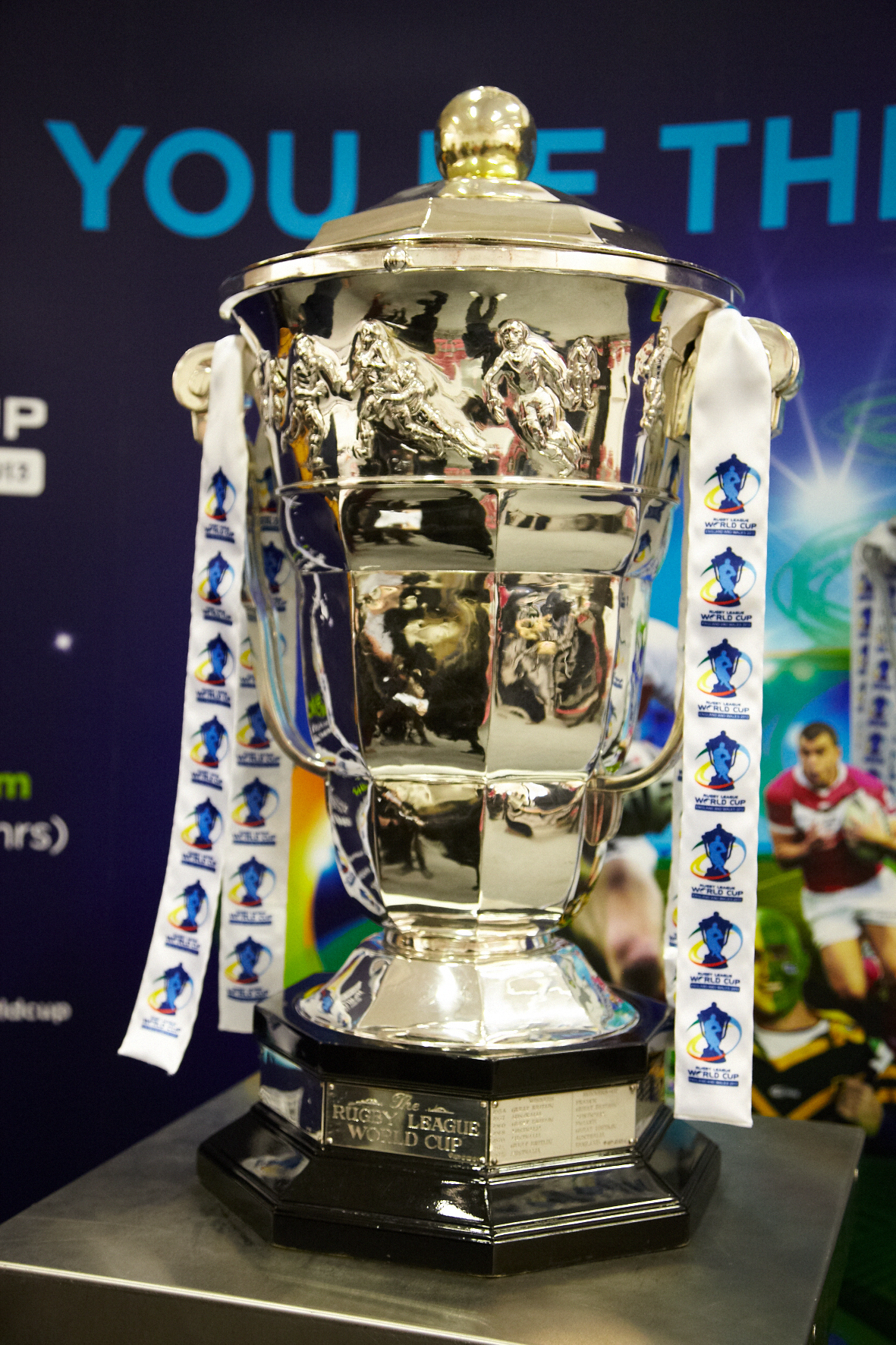
The Paul Barrière Trophy of the Rugby League World Cup

=== Global ===
Competition	Teams
**Rugby League World Cup**	(United Nations) All Nations
**Rugby League Four Nations**	England, Australia, New Zealand, Guest

=== Continental ===
Competition	Teams
**Rugby League European Championship**	(European Union) Europe
Rugby League European Championship B	(European Union) Europe
Rugby League European Championship C	(European Union) Europe
Rugby League European Championship D	(European Union) Europe
**Rugby League Pacific Championships**	Oceania
Americas Rugby League Championship	North America
South American Rugby League Championship	South America
MEA Rugby League Championships	(African Union) Africa and (Arab League) The Middle East

=== Regional ===
Competition	Teams
Asian Cup	South East Asia
Balkans Cup	The Balkans
Mediterranean Cup	Mediterranean Countries
Nordic Cup	The Nordic Countries
Caribbean Carnival Cup	The Caribbean

=== Challenge Matches ===
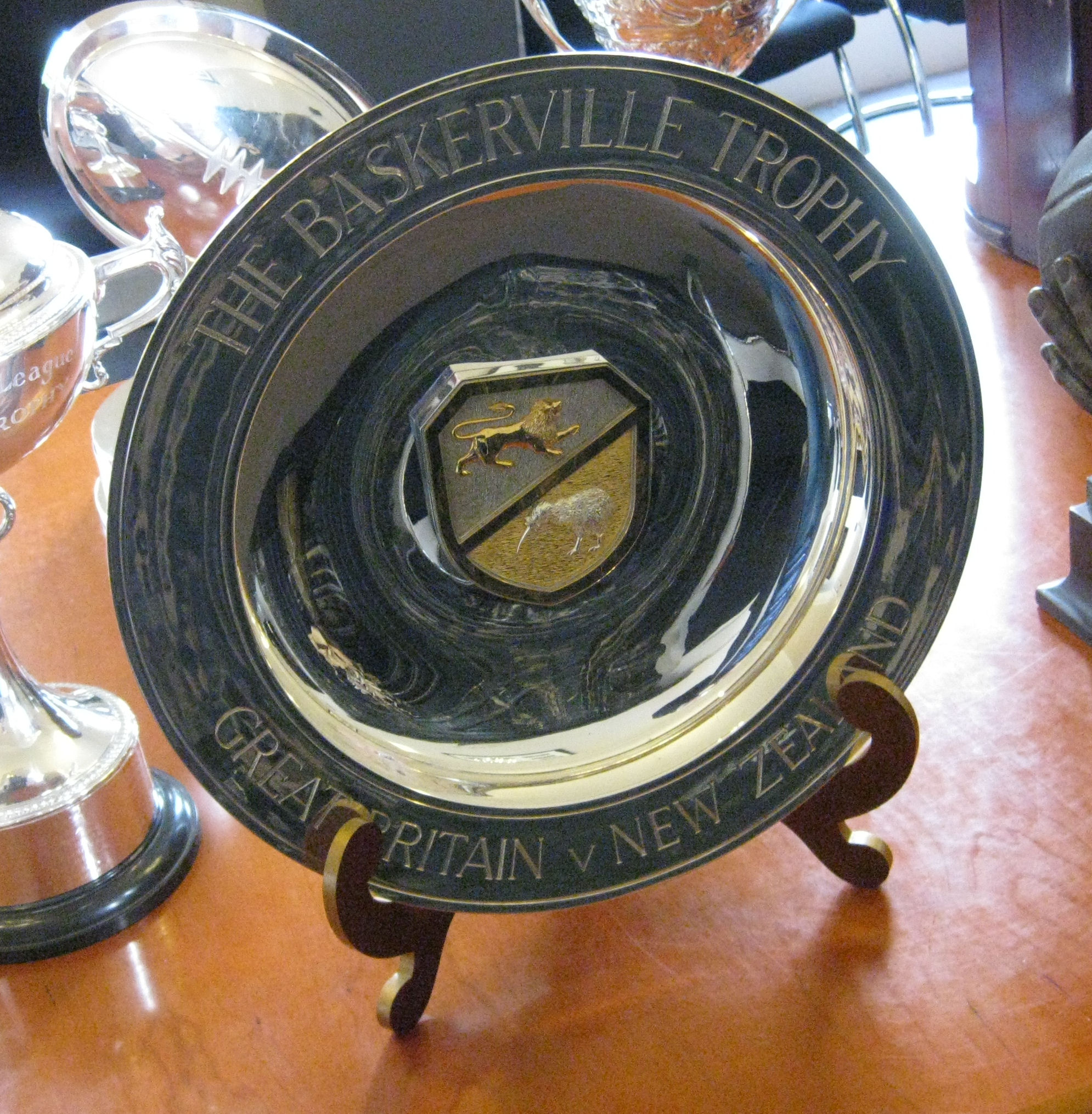
Trophy of the Baskerville Shield between England and New Zealand

Competition	Teams
**Anzac Test**	Australia vs New Zealand
**The Ashes**	Australia vs England
**Baskerville Shield**	England vs New Zealand
**Polynesian Cup**	Samoa vs Tonga
**Melanesian Cup**	Fiji vs Papua New Guinea
Colonial Cup	Canada vs United States
Griffin Cup	Germany vs Netherlands
Hayne/Mannah Cup	Fiji vs Lebanon (One-off match)
**Peter Leitch QSM Challenge**	New Zealand vs Any Pacific Island Nations
**State of Origin series**	Queensland vs New South Wales
**War of the Roses**	Lancashire vs Yorkshire

== Domestic Leagues ==
=== Europe ===
Bosnia and Herzegovina

Competition	Teams	Instituted	Tier
Bosnia & Herzegovina Championship	1	2012	1

Czech Republic

Competition	Teams	Instituted	Tier
CZRLA First Division	7	2011	1
CZRLA Second Division	4	2011	2

Denmark

Competition	Teams	Instituted	Tier
Danish Rugby League Championship	2	2013	1

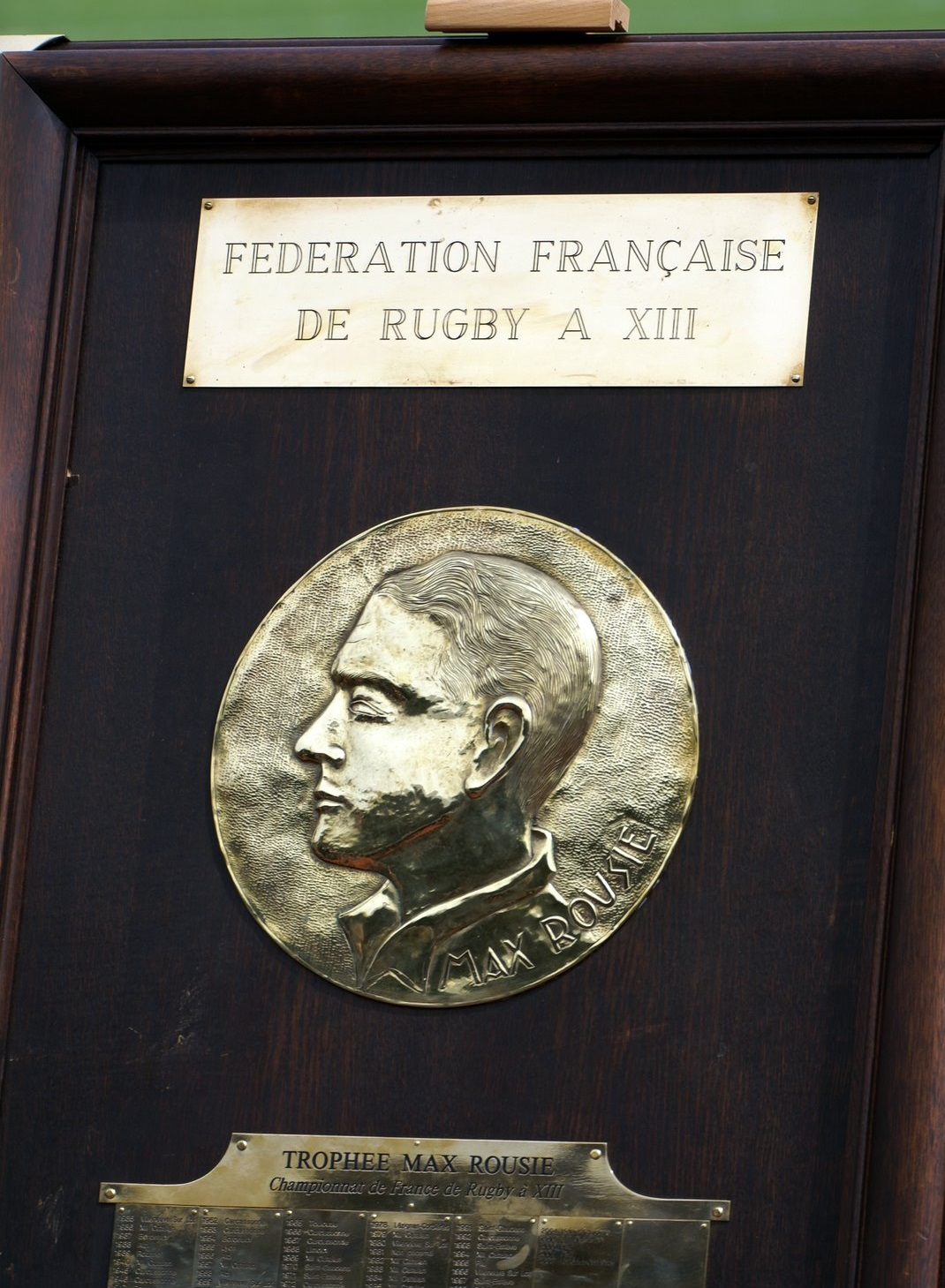
Trophy of the Elite One Championship

France

Competition	Teams	Instituted	Tier
**Super XIII**	11	1931	1
**Elite 2**	9	1982	2
National Division 1	8	1976	3
National Division 2	25	1978	4

(United Kingdom) Great Britain (Note: The Super League and lower division are British competitions ran by the RFL. Despite this foreign teams do compete in these competition. For a list of Non-British clubs that currently compete in these competition see here.)

Competition	Teams	Instituted	Tier
**Super League (Note: Successor to Rugby Football League Championship First Division instituted in 1895.)**	12	1996	1
**RFL Championship (Note: Successor to Rugby Football League Championship Second Division instituted in 1902.)**	14	2003	2
**RFL League 1**	9	2003	3
National Conference League	(Note: 4 divisions: 12 in Premier Division, Division One, and Division Two. 14 in Division Three.)	1986	4
Conference League South	12	2012	4

Ireland

Competition	Teams	Instituted	Tier
RLI Premiership	5	1997	1
RLI Championship	3	????	2

Italy

Competition	Teams	Instituted	Tier
Italia Rugby Football League	3	2010	1

Netherlands

Competition	Teams	Instituted	Tier
Dutch Rugby League Competition	6	2014	1

Norway

Competition	Teams	Instituted	Tier
Norge National Championship	5	2010	1

Russia

Competition	Teams	Instituted	Tier
Russian Championship	9	1991	1

Serbia

Competition	Teams	Instituted	Tier
Serbian Championship	8	2002	1

Spain

Competition	Teams	Instituted	Tier
Campeonato Nacional de Liga	6	2014	1
Catalan Rugby League Championship	9	2009	2

Sweden

Competition	Teams	Instituted	Tier
Sweden Super League	3	2011	1

Ukraine

Competition	Teams	Instituted	Tier
Ukraine Super League	7	2012	1

Multinational

Competition	Teams	Instituted	Criteria
Balkan Super League	6 (Lv 1); 7 (Lv 2)	2018	Balkan nations

=== Asia - Pacific ===
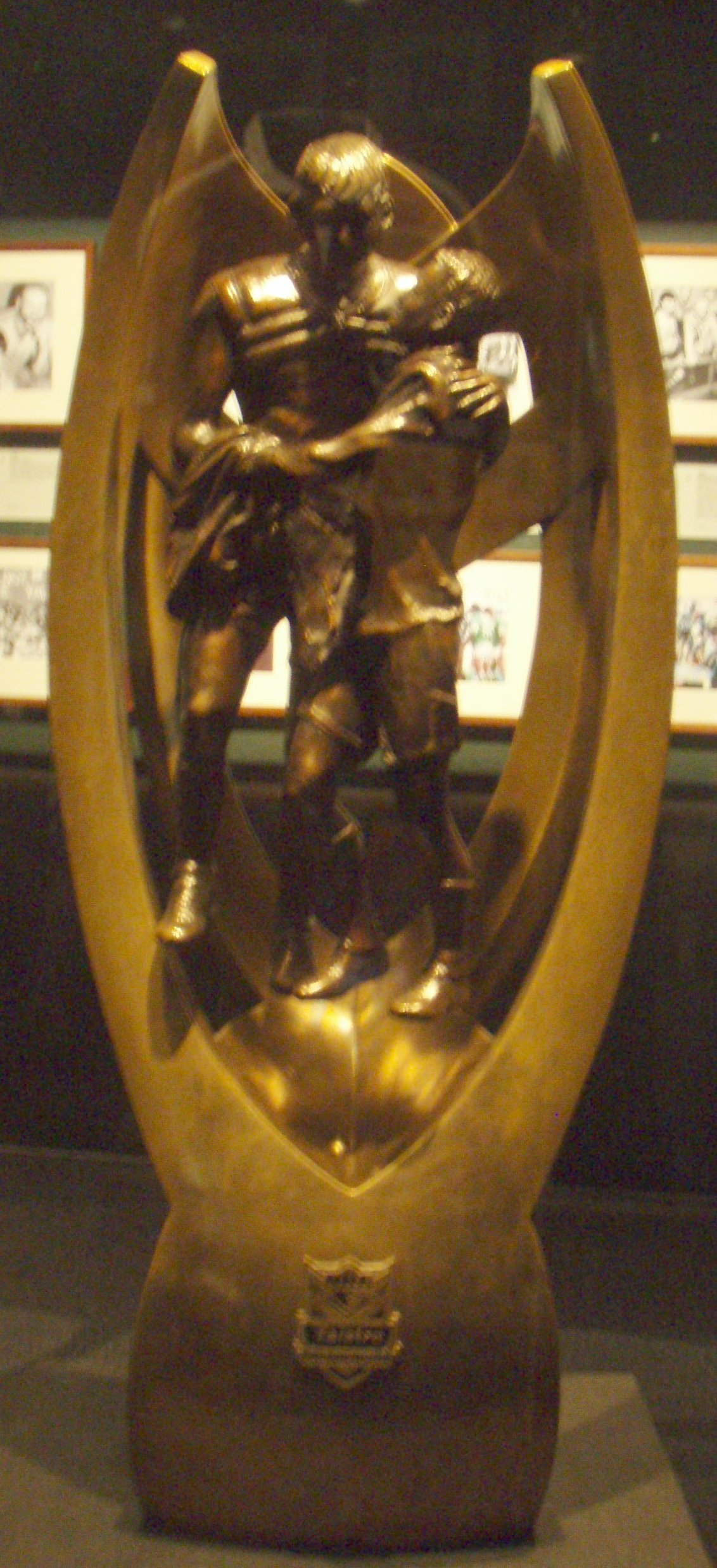
The NRL Grand Final trophy

Australia

Competition	Teams	Instituted	Tier
(Australia) **National Rugby League (Note: The National Rugby League is an Australian competitions ran by the ARL. Despite this a foreign team does compete in this competition – New Zealand's New Zealand Warriors.)**	17	1998	1
**New South Wales Cup**	14	1908	2
**Queensland Cup (Note: The Queensland Cup is an Australian competitions ran by the QRL, a state governing body within the ARL. Despite this a foreign team does compete in this competition – Papua New Guinea's Papua New Guinea Hunters.)**	14	1996	2
(Victoria (state)) **Melbourne Rugby League**	17	2001	2
**NRL South Australia**	5	1952	2
**NRL Western Australia**	14	1948	2
Northern Territory Rugby league	6	1951	2
Ron Massey Cup (Note: The Ron Massey Cup is an Sydney based competitions ran by the NSWRL and CRL. Despite this a foreign team does compete in this competition from Fiji.)			3
NSW North Coast Division			3
NSW Greater Northern Division			3
NSW Riverina and Monaro Division			3
NSW Western Division			3
NSW Greater Southern Division			3
NSW Newcastle and Central Coast Division			3
Queensland Rugby League Central Division			3
Queensland Rugby League Northern Division			3
Queensland Rugby League South East Queensland Division			3
Sunraysia-Riverlands Rugby League			3
Limestone Coast Rugby League			3
Pilbara Rugby League			3

Cook Islands

Competition	Teams	Instituted	Tier
Cook Islands League	7	1994	1

Fiji

Competition	Teams	Instituted	Tier
Fiji National Rugby League	14	2010	1

New Zealand

Competition	Teams	Instituted	Tier
**NZRL National Competition**	7	2010	1

Papua New Guinea

Competition	Teams	Instituted	Tier
**Papua New Guinea National Rugby League**	12	1990	1

Philippines

Competition	Teams	Instituted	Tier
PNRL Shield	5	2013	1

Thailand

Competition	Teams	Instituted	Tier
Thailand Rugby League Premiership	6	2014	1

Tonga

Competition	Teams	Instituted	Tier
**Tongan National Rugby League**	12	1988	1

=== Middle East - Africa ===
Ghana

Competition	Teams	Instituted	Tier
Ghana 13s Championship	4	2015	1

Kenya

Competition	Teams	Instituted	Tier
Kenya Rugby League Premiership	8	2017	1

Lebanon

Competition	Teams	Instituted	Tier
Lebanon Championship	10	2002	1

Nigeria

Competition	Teams	Instituted	Tier
Nigeria Rugby League	10	2019	1

South Africa

Competition	Teams	Instituted	Tier
**Rhino Cup**	8	2011	1
Protea Cup	4	2013	2
Western Province Rugby League	5	2012	3
Jan Prinsloo Cup	?	2019	3

=== The Americas ===
Brazil

Competition	Teams	Instituted	Tier
TOP 1 - Brazilian Rugby League 13-a-side Championship	8	2019	1
TOP 2 - Brazilian Rugby League 13-a-side Second Division Championship	4	2019	2

Canada

Competition	Teams	Instituted	Tier
British Columbia Rugby League	6	2012	2
Ontario Rugby League Competition	3	2010	2
Alberta Rugby League Competition	3	2019	2

Jamaica

Competition	Teams	Instituted	Tier
Jamaica National League	8	2005	1

United States

Competition	Teams	Instituted	Tier
(New England) North East Rugby League (Note: Winner of each region enters playoff to decide the champion of the USARL competition)	4	2011 (Note: New England Rugby League was the entire USARL competition until 2014, and as such was call simply "USARL". From 2014, and the formation of Florida Rugby League, until 2023 the competition was called "USARL Northern Conference".) (Note: Not active in 2023)	1
Florida Rugby League	4	2014 (Note: Called "USARL Southern Conference" from 2014 to 2023)	1
(California) Pacific Coast Rugby League	6	2018 (Note: Not integrated into the USARL competition until 2024)	1
Utah Rugby League	4	2024	1

Multinational

Competition	Teams	Instituted	Tier
Toronto Wolfpack Canada Cup	10	2023	1

== Domestic Cups ==
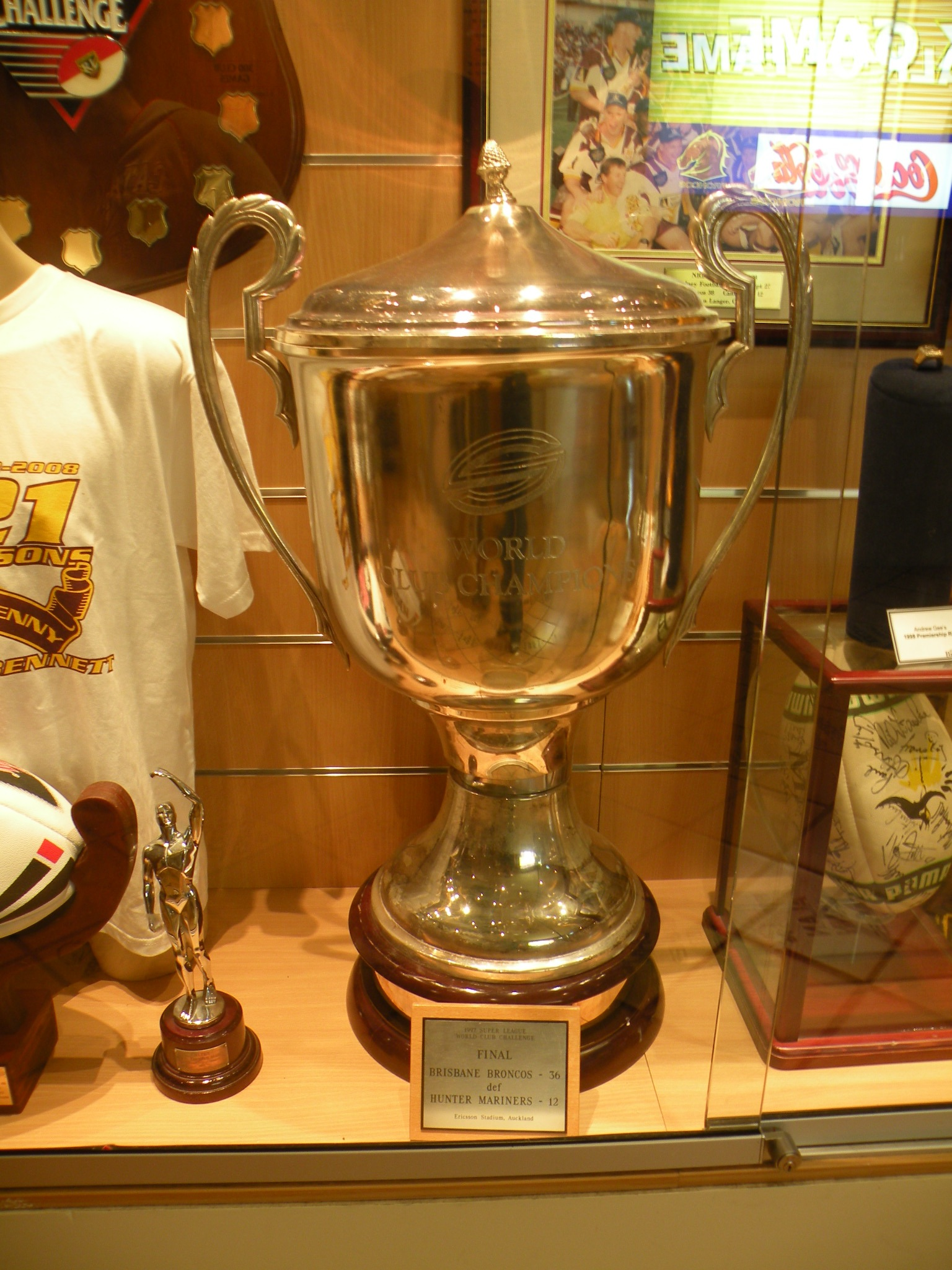
The former trophy of the World Club Challenge

Australia/ (United Kingdom) Great Britain

Competition	Teams	Instituted	Criteria
**World Club Challenge**	2	1976	Champions of NRL and Super League

Australia

Competition	Teams	Instituted	Criteria
**NRL State Championship**	2	2014	Champions of New South Wales Cup and Queensland Cup

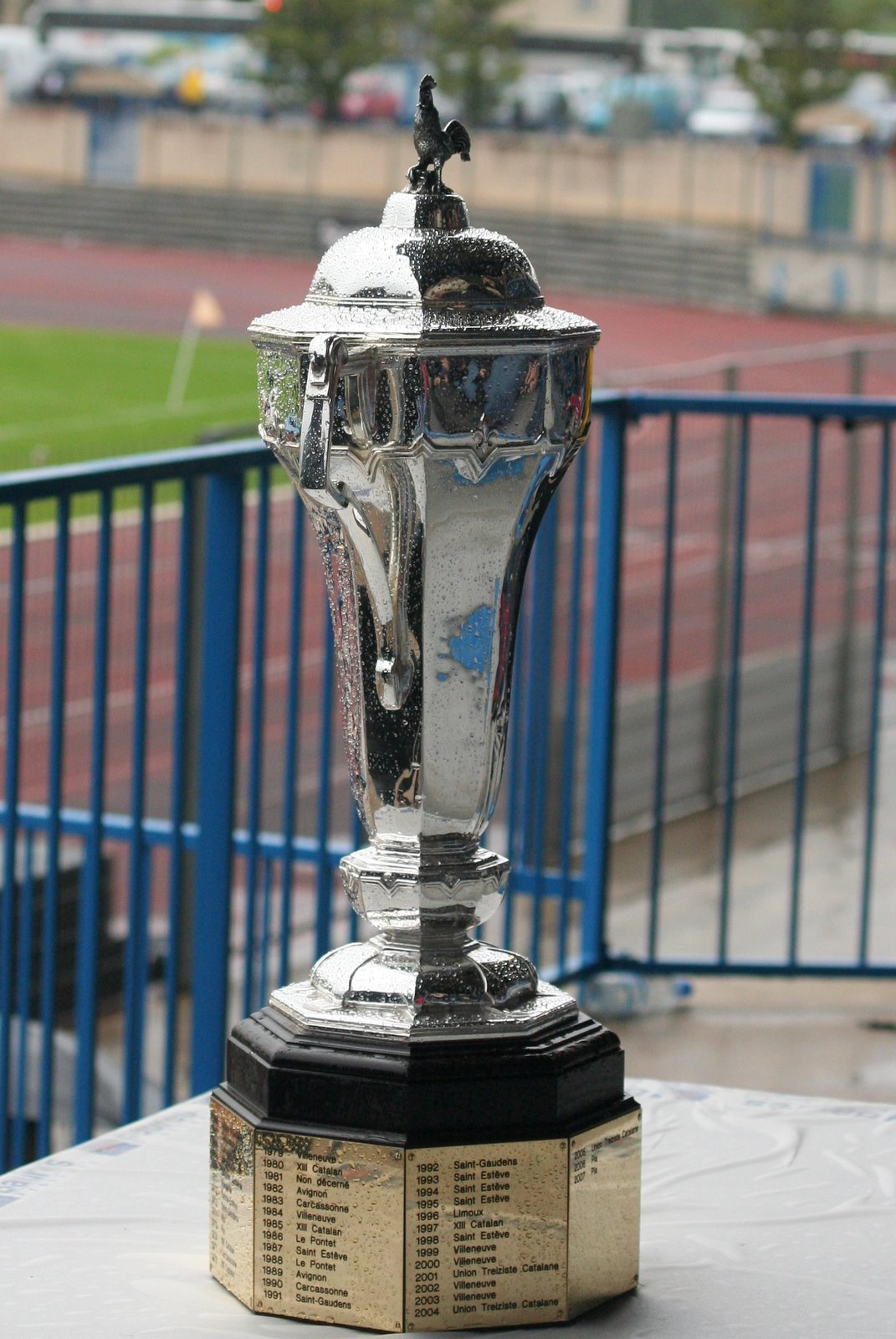
The Lord Derby Cup trophy

France

Competition	Teams	Instituted	Criteria
**Lord Derby Cup**		1934	

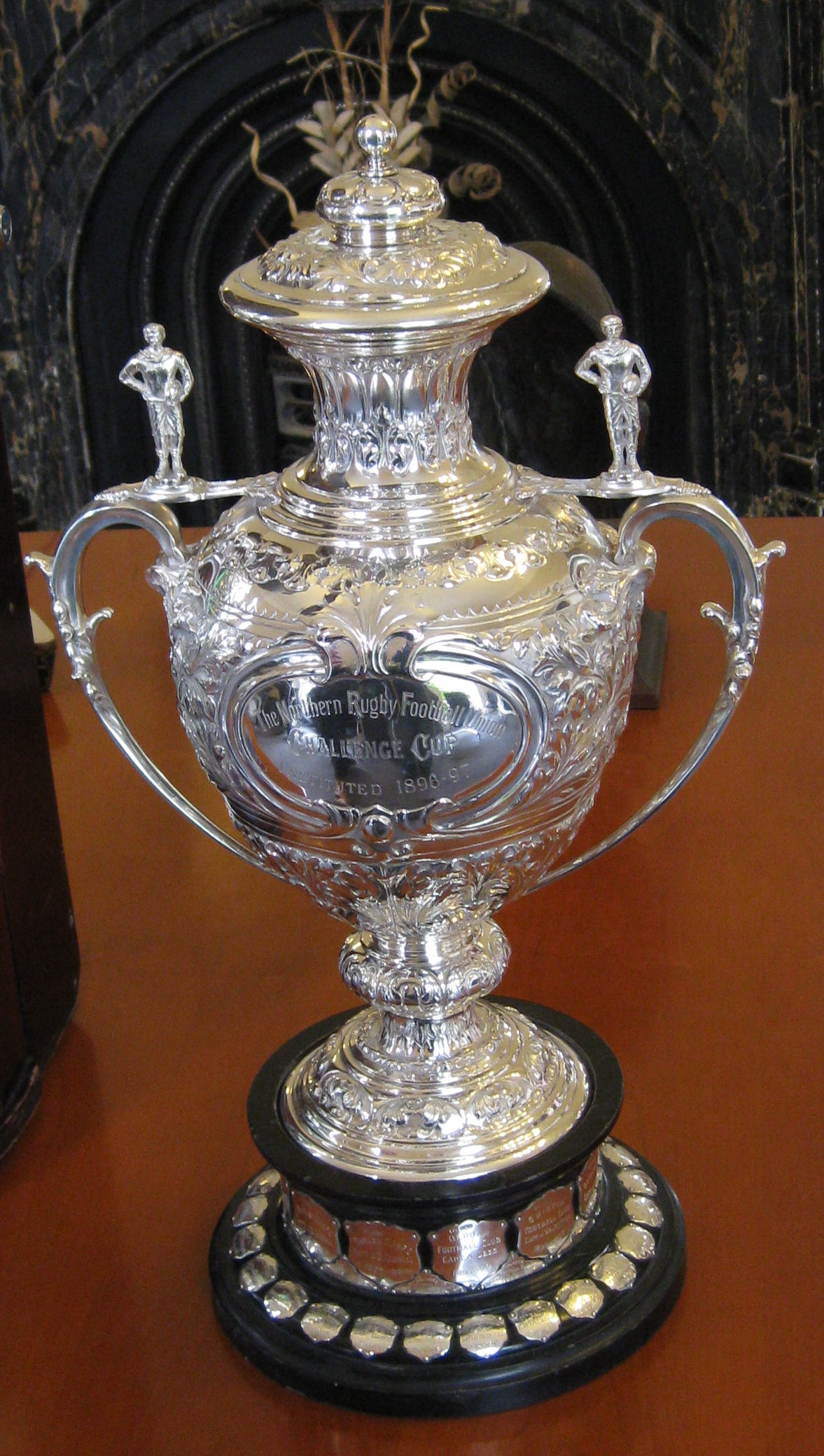
The Challenge Cup trophy

(United Kingdom) Great Britain

Competition	Teams	Instituted	Criteria
**Challenge Cup (Note: The Challenge Cup has also seen teams from Ireland, France, Russia, and Serbia compete in the competition.)**	80	1896	All Teams
**1895 Cup**	20	2019	Tiers 2 and 3
Conference Challenge Trophy	58	????	Tier 4
BARLA National Cup	?	1973	Amateur Clubs
Scottish Cup	4	????	Scottish National League

Serbia

Competition	Teams	Instituted	Criteria
Serbian Cup		2001	

Spain

Competition	Teams	Instituted	Tier
Copa España	6	2013	1

== Women's Rugby League ==
=== International tournaments ===
==== International ====
Competition	Criteria
**Women's Rugby League World Cup**	Global

==== Continental ====
Competition	Teams
Women's Rugby League European Championship	Europe
Women's Rugby League European Championship B	Europe
Americas Rugby League Championship	North America
South American Rugby League Championship	South America

==== Challenge Matches ====
Competition	Teams
**The Ashes**	Australia vs England

=== Domestic Leagues ===
Australia

Competition	Teams	Instituted	Tier
**NRL Women's Premiership**	6	2018	1
Brisbane and District Women's Rugby League	12	2004	2
Nellie Doherty Cup	2	1999	1
Sydney Metropolitan Women's Rugby League	12	2005	2
Tarsha Gale Nines	12	2016	3

(United Kingdom) Great Britain

Competition	Teams	Instituted	Tier
**RFL Women's Super League**	8	2017	1
RFL Women's Championship		2017	2

Ireland

Competition	Teams	Instituted	Tier
RLI Women's Premiership	3	2021	1

Papua New Guinea

Competition	Teams	Instituted	Tier
PNG Women's Rugby League	10	1990	1

=== Domestic Cups ===
(United Kingdom) Great Britain

Competition	Teams	Instituted	Criteria
**RFL Women's Challenge Cup**		2012	All Teams

== Nines tournaments ==
=== International ===
Global

- (United Nations) Rugby League World Cup 9s
- (United Nations) Super League World Nines (1996 to 1997)

Regional

- Rugby league at the Pacific Games

=== Domestic ===
- (Australia) / (New Zealand) NRL Nines
- (United Kingdom) RFL Women's Nines

== See also ==
- Geography of rugby league
- List of rugby league tours
