= Canadian Rugby Union =

Canadian Rugby Union may refer to:

- Football Canada, the governing body of amateur Canadian football in Canada, previously known as the Canadian Rugby Union from 1892 to 1967.
  - Canadian football, the Canadian version of gridiron football, formerly referred to as rugby
- Rugby Canada, which has governed rugby union in Canada since its incorporation in 1974.
- Rugby union in Canada
  - Canada national rugby union team, men's
  - Canada women's national rugby union team

== See also ==
- Rugby league in Canada
  - Canada Rugby League, the governing body for rugby league in Canada
  - Canada national rugby league team, men's
  - Canada women's national rugby league team
- Rugby sevens in Canada
  - Canada national rugby sevens team
  - Canada women's national rugby sevens team
- Rugby in Canada (disambiguation)
- Football in Canada (disambiguation)
