= South American Rugby League Championship =

Rugby league football tournament

- Current season, competition or edition: 2024 South American Rugby League Championship
- Sport: Rugby league
- Founded: 2018; 8 years ago
- No. of teams: 3
- Country: South America
- Most recent champions: Chile (1st title - men's); Brazil (1st title - women's)
- Most titles: Brazil (2 titles - men's); Brazil (1 title - women's)
- Level on pyramid: 1

The South American Rugby League Championship is a rugby league football tournament for South American national teams that was first held in 2018.

== History ==
The inaugural South American Rugby League Championship was held in 2018 which was both hosted and won by Brazil in both the men's and women's tournament. However it wasn't until the second edition in 2022 that the tournament was played under International Rugby League specifications. The tournament acts as South American World Cup qualification tournament with the winners gaining the right to play in the Americas Rugby League Championship, the winner of that tournament qualifies for the World Cup. Brazil again won the 2022 edition. The 2022 women's tournament did not occur due to Brazil competing in the delayed 2021 World Cup. Following 2022, the tournament would be played annually with the 2023 event set to feature wheelchair rugby league for the first time, and will also be the first time an official wheelchair game takes place in South America. To celebrate this, the Wales wheelchair team will travel to South America to play a three match test series against Brazil, marking the first ever European rugby league team to play in South America. The 2023 event did not go ahead for unknown reasons. In 2024, Chile won its first title with a win over Brazil and a defeat against Argentina, but still winning the title via points difference.

== Men's Tournament ==
The men's tournament is the competition for senior male national sides.

=== Results ===
Year	Champions	Runners-up	Third place	Teams	Ref.
(Brazil) 2018	Brazil	Argentina	Colombia	3	
(Colombia) 2022	Brazil	Colombia	Chile	3	
(Brazil) 2023	Argentina, Brazil, Paraguay			3	
(Argentina) 2024	Chile	Argentina	Brazil	3	

== Men's Silver Cup ==
The men's silver cup is the competition for B teams senior male national sides.

=== Results ===
Year	Champions	Runners-up	Teams	Ref.
(Brazil) 2018	Brazil B	Argentina B	2	
(Colombia) 2022 to (Argentina) 2024	None			

== Men's Youth Tournament ==
During the 2018 tournament, a youth tournament was held between Argentina's and Brazil's under-17s side. The youth tournament is expected to resume in 2023.

=== Results ===
Year	Champions	Runners-up	Teams	Ref.
(Brazil) 2018	Brazil U-17	Argentina U-17	2	
(Colombia) 2022	None			
(Brazil) 2023	Argentina U-17, Brazil U-17, Paraguay U-17			

== Women's Tournament ==
The women's tournament is the competition for senior female national sides.

=== Results ===
Year	Champions	Runners-up	Teams	Ref.
(Brazil) 2018	Brazil	Argentina	2	
(Colombia) 2022	Did not occur due to Brazil's participation in the delayed 2021 World Cup			
(Brazil) 2023	Argentina, Brazil, Paraguay		3	

== Wheelchair Tournament ==
The wheelchair tournament is set to debut in 2023 marking the first official wheelchair games in South America.

=== Results ===
Year	Champions	Runners-up	Third place	Teams	Ref.
(Brazil) 2023	Argentina, Brazil, Paraguay			3	
