= Rugby in Canada =

Rugby in Canada may refer to:

- Rugby league in Canada
- Rugby union in Canada
- Canadian football, the Canadian version of gridiron football, formerly referred to as rugby

== See also ==
- Canadian Rugby Union (disambiguation)
- Football in Canada (disambiguation)
