= 2026 Rugby League British Columbia season =

2026 RLBC Season
- Structure: Double robin + playoffs
- League: Rugby League British Columbia
- Duration: May 30 – July 25, 2026
- Teams: 4
- Minor premiers: Whistler Wolves (3rd title)
- Champions: Whistler Wolves (3rd title)

The 2026 Rugby League British Columbia season was the 15th season of men's amateur and semi-professional rugby league competition in the province of British Columbia Canada under the governance of the RLBC.

== League notes and format ==
The league saw the return of all four of last season's teams, but the Valley Warriors were unable to field a team in 2026 after spending the 2025 season merged with the Point Grey Thunder as the Valley Grey Thunderwahs. RLBC 9s kicked off the season, with Brockton Oval as the host of the tournament.

The season's premiership format had the four teams play a double-round-robin.

For the playoffs, the minor premiers advanced to the grand final against the winner of the semi-final between the 2nd and 3rd.

== Teams ==
Team	Stadium	City/Area	2025 form
Point Grey Thunder	Wolfson Field at the University of British Columbia	Vancouver, British Columbia	3rd
Vancouver Valley Vipers	Langley Rugby Club Brockton Oval	Langley, British Columbia (city)	Runner-Up
Vancouver Dragons	Brockton Oval Langley Rugby Club	Vancouver, British Columbia	4th
Whistler Wolves	Whistler Secondary School	Whistler, British Columbia	Champions

== Regular season ==
=== Round 1 ===
Home	Score	Away	Match Information
Home	Score	Away	Date	Venue	Report
Whistler Wolves	34 - 20	Vancouver Valley Vipers	May 30, 2026	Brockton Oval
Point Grey Thunder	34 - 30	Vancouver Dragons	May 30, 2026	Brockton Oval

=== Round 2 ===
Home	Score	Away	Match Information
Home	Score	Away	Date	Venue	Report
Whistler Wolves	58 - 6	Vancouver Dragons	June 6, 2026	Whistler Secondary School
Vancouver Valley Vipers	34 - 38	Point Grey Thunder	June 6, 2026	Langley Rugby Club

=== Round 3 ===
Home	Score	Away	Match Information
Home	Score	Away	Date	Venue	Report
Point Grey Thunder	10 - 68	Whistler Wolves	June 13, 2026	Brockton Oval
Vancouver Valley Vipers	30 - 46	Vancouver Dragons	June 13, 2026	Brockton Oval

=== Round 4 ===
Home	Score	Away	Match Information
Home	Score	Away	Date	Venue	Report
Point Grey Thunder	30 - 28	Vancouver Dragons	June 20, 2026	Wolfson Field at the University of British Columbia
Whistler Wolves	42 - 18	Vancouver Valley Vipers	June 20, 2026	Wolfson Field at the University of British Columbia

=== Round 5* ===
Home	Score	Away	Match Information
Home	Score	Away	Date	Venue	Report
Point Grey Thunder	10 - 46	Vancouver Valley Vipers	July 11, 2026	Prince of Wales Secondary School
Vancouver Dragons	22 - 24	Whistler Wolves	July 11, 2026	Prince of Wales Secondary School

- - Matches were postponed to the 11th, originally was to be played on the 4th.

=== Round 6 ===
Home	Score	Away	Match Information
Home	Score	Away	Date	Venue	Report
Vancouver Dragons	36 - 40	Vancouver Valley Vipers	July 4, 2026	Langley Rugby Club
Whistler Wolves	66 - 4	Point Grey Thunder	July 4, 2026	Whistler Secondary School

== Standings ==
Legend
Minor Premiers (Advances to Grand Final)
Grand Final Eliminator

2026 Rugby League British Columbia season
Pos	Team	Pld	W	D	L	PF	PA	PD	Pts	Qualification
1	Whistler Wolves (P)(C)	6	6	0	0	292	80	+212	12	Minor Premiers
2	Point Grey Thunder	6	3	0	3	184	330	-146	6	Grand Final Eliminator
3	Vancouver Valley Vipers	6	2	0	4	170	188	-18	4	Grand Final Eliminator
4	Vancouver Dragons	6	1	0	5	168	216	-48	2	

== Playoffs ==
=== Grand Final Eliminator ===
Home	Score	Away	Match Information
Home	Score	Away	Date	Venue	Report
Point Grey Thunder	22 - 30	Vancouver Valley Vipers	July 18, 2026	John Oliver Park

=== Grand Final ===
Home	Score	Away	Match Information
Home	Score	Away	Date	Venue	Report
Whistler Wolves	28 - 14	Vancouver Valley Vipers	July 25, 2026	Burnaby Lake Sports Complex
