= Tullamore Knights =

Rugby league team from Tullamore, Offaly, Ireland

The Tullamore Knights are a Rugby league team from Tullamore, Offaly, Ireland. The Knights play in the Irish Elite League. The Knights play their home games at Spollanstown Park, Tullamore.

== See also ==
- Rugby league in Ireland
- List of rugby league competitions
