= Football in Canada =

Football in Canada may refer to:

- Canadian football, a version of gridiron football played almost exclusively in Canada
  - Professional football in Canada
- Soccer in Canada, association football in the country

== See also ==
- List of gridiron football teams in Canada
- Football Canada, an amateur sport governing body for the Canadian version of gridiron football in Canada; formerly the governing body for the Canadian version of rugby football in Canada
- Canada Soccer, the soccer governing body of Canada
- Rugby Canada, the governing body for rugby union in Canada
- Canada Rugby League, the governing body for rugby league in Canada
- Canadian Rugby Union (disambiguation)
- Rugby in Canada (disambiguation)
