= Brackendale, British Columbia =

Community in British Columbia, Canada

Brackendale
- Community
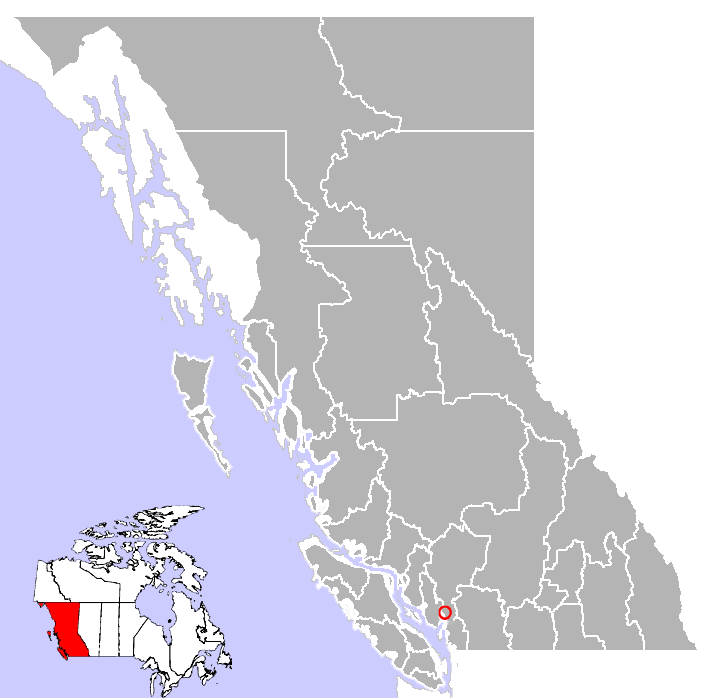
- Location of Brackendale in British Columbia
- Coordinates: 49°45′51″N 123°8′51″W
- Country: Canada
- Province: British Columbia
- Region: Howe Sound/Sea to Sky Country
- Regional district: Squamish-Lillooet

Government
  - Governing body: District of Squamish
  - Mayor: Armand Hurford
- Elevation: 40 m (130 ft)
- Time zone: UTC−07:00 (PT)
- Highways: 99

Brackendale is a small community in the Canadian province of British Columbia just north of Squamish town centre, but still within the District of Squamish. It is located near the confluence of the Squamish River and the Cheakamus River. It is intersected primarily by Government Road and Depot Road. The CN railway (formerly BC Rail) traverses it north–south. It includes the remarkable "Eagle Run" area, the wintering home of thousands of bald eagles.

== Climate ==
The climate of Brackendale is dry in the summertime and mild and damp in the winter. The coastal maritime climate is moderated by nearby Howe Sound, but outflow winds from the British Columbia Interior via the Whistler Valley and the many large ice caps in the Pacific Ranges are so fierce that winds of this type are sometimes known as squamish winds.

== History ==
Brackendale was named for Thomas Hirst Bracken, Brackendale's first postmaster, who also operated a general store and the Bracken Arms Hotel. When the hotel burned down, he returned to England and died there. Brackendale is served by two schools in the Sea to Sky School District (#48); Brackendale Elementary School and Don Ross Middle School. It is the location of the Squamish airport (CYSE), with a runway long enough to handle light planes and helicopters.

The Brackendale Art Gallery (the BAG), opened by artists Thor and Dorte Froslev, is a major cultural institution in the region, featuring local artists and visiting exhibitions. The couple put the aging building up for sale in 2015, but as of 2018, no interested parties had stepped forward to purchase it. Some have argued that the building should be purchased by the district and made public. In 2023, the Brackendale Art Gallery was purchased by locals Adrian Blachut and Jessica Rigg and underwent updates before reopening in early 2024.
