= Rugby League British Columbia =

Rugby league governing body in British Columbia.

- Current season or competition: 2026 Rugby League British Columbia season
- RLBC Logo (Aug. 3, 2020)
- Sport: Rugby league
- Instituted: 2011
- Inaugural season: 2012
- Number of teams: 8 (6 - men; 2 women)
- Country: British Columbia, Canada (Canada Rugby League)
- Current Grand Final Champions: Whistler Wolves (2026)
- Most titles: Surrey Beavers, Coastal Cougars, Whistler Wolves (3 titles)
- Website: https://www.rugbyleaguebc.ca/

Rugby League British Columbia (or the RLBC), formerly known as British Columbia Rugby League, is a non-profit organization and a member of Canada Rugby League. RLBC operates a domestic rugby league football competition in British Columbia, Canada that currently features six teams with the addition of the Whistler Wolves for the 2020 season. The RLBC, with its clubs, additionally host events and competitions involving junior club teams and women's team to expand the sport of Rugby League in the province.

== Teams ==
The RLBC competition started in May 2012 with 5 teams, Bayside Sharks, Burnaby Lake Rugby Club, Kelowna Crows, Sea to Sky Eagles and Surrey Beavers. The RLBC operates such that its member clubs are responsible for developing teams for the purposes of competing against other clubs. Since 2012, the men's competition has expanded to 6 teams making it the largest domestic rugby league competition in Canada. The season includes the regular season, culminating in the Grand Final, and a Rugby league nines tournament prior to the regular season.

In 2020, the Vancouver Dragons and Valley Warriors developed women's teams and the RLBC was prepared for delivery of the country's first intraprovincial women's competition. The clubs are the primary source for the province's representative teams.

Team	Stadium	Seasons	City/Area	Grand Championships	9's Tournament Championships
Vancouver Valley Vipers		3 (2019–present)	Langley, British Columbia (city)	0	0
Coastal Cougars (formerly Sea to Sky Eagles)	Howe Sound Secondary School, Squamish	10 (2012–present)	Squamish, British Columbia	3 (2015, 2016, 2019)	3 (2016, 2017, 2019)
Point Grey Thunder	UBC, Wolfson Rugby, Vancouver	3 (2019–present)	Vancouver, British Columbia	2 (2021,2022)	1 (2022)
Valley Warriors	South Surrey Athletic Park, South Surrey	8 (2014–present)	South Surrey, British Columbia	1 (2017)	0
Vancouver Dragons	Brockton Oval Stanley Park, Vancouver	9 (2013–present)	Vancouver, British Columbia	1 (2018)	1 (2018)
Whistler Wolves		2 (2020–present)	Whistler, British Columbia	3 (2024,2025,2026)	3 (2023,2024,2026)
Abbotsford Griffins	N/A	4 (2015–2018)	Abbotsford, British Columbia	0	0
Bayside Sharks	N/A	1 (2012)	White Rock, British Columbia	0	0
Burnaby Lake Rugby Club	N/A	1 (2012)	Burnaby, British Columbia	0	0
Kelowna Crows	N/A	1 (2012)	Kelowna, British Columbia	0	0
Kelowna Roosters	N/A	2 (2012 & 2017)	Kelowna, British Columbia		
Richmond Bears	N/A	1 (2013)	Richmond, British Columbia	0	1 (2015)
Surrey Beavers	N/A	4 (2012–2015)	Surrey, British Columbia	3 (2012, 2013, 2014)	0
Whistler Wildcats	N/A	1 (2014)	Whistler, British Columbia		1 (2014)
Vancouver Thunderbirds	N/A/	1 (2015)	Vancouver, British Columbia	0	0

Legend
Currently in the competition.
Currently not in the competition

== History ==
In 2012, the Surrey Beavers played against Kelowna Crows in the Grand Final winning 20 to 4 to then go on to the Premier's Challenge to take on the BC Selects (reserve grade team of the BC Bulldogs). The BC Selects defeated Surrey Beavers 28 to 6. Following the conclusion of the 2012 season, Burnaby Lake Rugby Club withdrew from the competition.

In 2013, RLBC announced the expansion of the competition to include a further 2 teams, Richmond Bears Rugby League Club and the Vancouver Dragons Rugby League Football Club. However, the expansion was met with 4 of the original six Clubs stepping away from the competition (although 2 would return in the future). The Grand Final pitted the previous season champions against the Sea to Sky Eagles-based out of Squamish. The Surrey Beavers were victorious.

In 2015, the Coastal Cougars (playing as the Capilano Cougars) were the top-placed team after going undefeated all season and defeated the Vancouver Dragons in the Grand Final 30 to 6.

In 2016, the Coastal Cougars again went undefeated and won the Grand Final over the Abbotsford Griffins by a score of 48–12.

In 2017, the Coastal Cougars lost their 2nd week match meaning the end of a remarkable winning streak that took them through over 2 seasons and ultimately ended at 12 wins in a row. In the Grand Final, the Valley Warriors laid claim to their first Grand Final Championship with a 20–0 win over the Kelowna Roosters, a founding member, who returned for play in 2017 and then subsequently ceased operations.

In 2018, the Vancouver Dragons collected their first Grand Final Championship with a narrow 26 to 24 over perennial powerhouse Coastal Cougars.

In 2019, the Point Grey Thunder qualified for their first Grand Final after a semi-final win over the Valley Warriors by a score of 34–14. In the final, however, they lost to the Coastal Cougars by a score of 38–28.

In 2020, the league expanded to include the Whistler Wolves and added two clubs, the Vancouver Dragons and Valley Warriors, established women's teams to compete. As a consequence of the COVID-19 pandemic, the season was unable to start.

== Structure and finance ==
Rugby League Clubs in the RLBC are incorporated societies and operate independently under the auspices of the RLBC and Canada Rugby League, or are post-secondary affiliated clubs.

Currently the RLBC is a self-funded entity and relies heavily on the contributions made by players and sponsors to help pay for the cost of league operations and representative teams.

== Representative squads ==
RLBC players consist of the men's team, the British Columbia Bulldogs and women's team, the British Columbia Storm. Players from the RLBC also make up the Western Canada Wild, a regional representative squad for the provinces of Manitoba, Alberta and British Columbia for both men and women. In 2020, the Western Canada Wild met the representative team for Eastern Canada in the "Thunderdome" at Lamport Stadium in Toronto, Ontario. The "thunderdome" being an event similar to the popular State of Origin series in Australia in which the teams are composed of the best players representing regions. In the inaugural Thunderdome, the Western Canada Wild women defeated Eastern Canada 24-18 while the men lost to Eastern Canada 14–44.

BC Bulldogs - Recent Fixtures

Date	Winning team	Score	Losing team	Location
Sep. 6, 2015	BC Bulldogs	38-12	Alberta Broncos	Kelowna, British Columbia
Oct. 13, 2016	Jamberoo Superoos	40-26	BC Bulldogs	Rotary Stadium, Abbotsford, British Columbia
Oct. 24, 2016	Queensland Police	50-0	BC Bulldogs	Rotary Stadium, Abbotsford, British Columbia
Sep 3, 2017	BC Bulldogs	40-22	Alberta Broncos	Calgary, Alberta
Oct. 29, 2017	Coogee Wombat	48-24	BC Bulldogs	Richmond, British Columbia
Sep. 2, 2018	BC Bulldogs	68-6	Alberta Broncos	St. Albert, Alberta
Sep. 1, 2019	BC Bulldogs	44-20	Alberta Broncos	St. Albert, Alberta

The roster for the BC Bulldogs against their provincial rival Alberta Broncos on September 2, 2018, is below.

BC Bulldogs Squad - Sept. 2, 2018
First team squad		Coaching staff
1 Ben McIvor – FB – Vancouver Dragons; 2 Luke Torroca – WG – Valley Warriors; 3 Rick Schouten – CE – Abbotsford Griffins; 4 Matthew Liszt – WG – Vancouver Dragons; 5 Liam Grogan – CE – Valley Warriors; 6 Taurean Sheehan – SO – Vancouver Dragons; 7 Connor Hunter – HB – Abbotsford Griffins; 8 Sam Collins – PR – Coastal Cougars; 9 Scyler Dumas - "C" – HK – Vancouver Dragons; 10 Joey Murphy – PR – Valley Warriors; 11 Stephen Lenahan – SR – Abbotsford Griffins; 12 Jason Hignell – SR – Abbotsford Griffins; 13 Benji Wilson – LF – Valley Warriors	14 Ray Bissonette – positions – Vancouver Dragons; 15 Nathan Kendrick – positions – Vancouver Dragons; 16 Ryan Mitchell – positions – Valley Warriors; 17 Blake Mahovic – positions – Coastal Cougars; 18 Jay Franklin – positions – Coastal Cougars	Head coach: Andy Blackburn; Assistant coaches: Wayne (assistant coach); Ally Mac (Junior Development); Mike Clark (Team Physio); Legend: (c) Captain(s); (vc) Vice-captain(s)

BC Storm - Recent Fixtures

Date	Winning team	Score	Losing team	Location
Sep. 3, 2017	Alberta Broncos	32-30	BC Storm	Calgary, Alberta
Jul. 27, 2018	New Zealand Universities	54-0	BC Storm	Delta, British Columbia
Sep. 1, 2019	BC Storm	26-26	Alberta Broncos	St. Albert, Alberta

The roster for the BC Storm as of September 1, 2019 when they took on the Alberta Broncos is below.

BC Storm Squad - Sept. 1, 2019
First team squad	Coaching staff
Melissa Seselja; Gabrielle Hindley; Kate Grudinski; Maira Acevedo; Kaila Pickering; Alexis Mok; Natalie King; Simran Gillar; Annalise Wilkinson; Shalaya Valenzuela; Sarah Duncan; Changelle Bracken-Illich	Head coach: Brian Wilkinson; Legend: (c) Captain(s); (vc) Vice-captain(s)

== See also ==
- Alberta Rugby League
- Ontario Rugby League
- Rugby league in Canada
- Ottawa Aces
- Toronto Wolfpack
