= 2022 South American Rugby League Championship =

- Number of teams: 3
- Host country: Colombia
- Winner: Brazil (2nd title)
- Matches played: 3
- Points scored: 142 (47.33 per match)
- Top scorer: (Brazil) Ravi Araujo (22)

The 2022 South American Rugby League Championship was the second edition of the tournament and was held in Jericó, Colombia between 25 and 27 November 2022. The teams participating in the tournament were Brazil, Chile and Colombia. Brazil won the tournament, winning both their games.

The tournament was also a qualification round for the 2025 Rugby League World Cup, as Brazil were to advance to the 2023 Americas Rugby League Championship where they were to play against Canada, Jamaica and United States to determine which two sides would represent the Americas in France in 2025. However, 2025 World Cup was cancelled before details of the Americas Rugby League Championship had been confirmed and the men's tournament did not take place in 2023. A different qualification process was announced for the 2026 World Cup.

== Participants ==
Team	Captain	Coach	Previous Apps	Previous best result	World Ranking (Note: IRL World Rankings are as of July 2022.)
Brazil	Caio Ozzioli	Zach Grundy	2	Champions (2018)	40
Chile	Nick Doberer	Andrew Charles	2	Champions (2017)	32
Colombia	Sebastian Martinez	Jorge Cantillo	2	Third place (2017/2018)	45

== Table ==
Pos	Team	Pld	W	D	L	PF	PA	PD	Pts	Qualification
1	Brazil	2	2	0	0	76	18	+58	4	Qualification for 2023 Americas Rugby League Championship
2	Chile	2	1	0	1	52	34	+18	2	
3	Colombia	2	0	0	2	14	90	−76	0	

Source: IRL

== Fixtures ==
25 November 2022
15:30 COT (UTC-05:00)

Chile	18–20	Brazil
Tries: Altamirano (2); Vasquez; Goals: Horvat (3)	report	Tries: Melo (2); Caetano; Paixāo; Goals: Domingues; Araujo

Estadio JB Londoño, Jericó
Referee: Andrew Pilkington (Spain)
Touch judges: Juan Blumetti (Argentina), Hugo Pulido (Colombia)

Team details
Chile		Position	Brazil
Name	Number	Position	Number	Name
Thomas Garrido	1	Fullback	1	Ravi Araujo
Zecil Yao	2	Wing	2	Marcos Paixāo
Jaime Santander	3	Centre	3	Douglas Parazi
Daniel Polanco	4	Centre	4	Donovan Barreira
Felipe Aedo	5	Wing	5	Fellipe Dittz
Christian Lopez	6	Five eighth	6	Victor Domingues
James Horvat	7	Half back	7	Zach Grundy
Ignacio Altamirano	8	Prop forward	8	Caio Ozzioli (c)
Mana Castillo-Sioni	9	Hooker	9	Lucas Domingues
Austin Olivares Ekes	10	Prop forward	10	Alyfer Dos Santos
Taylor Salas	11	Second row	11	Leandro Caetano
Nick Doberer (c)	12	Second row	12	Nicholas Sydorowitz
Daniel Vasquez	13	Lock forward	13	Gabriel Saraiva
Juan Ortiz	14	Interchange	14	Vinicius Parazi
Diego Quintul	15	Interchange	15	Diego Sanches Nogueira
Ferec Cabezas	16	Interchange	16	Luiz Bussolo
Moises Rojas	17	Interchange	17	Bruno Gil Melo
Andrew Charles		Coach		Zach Grundy

26 November 2022
15:30 COT (UTC-05:00)

Colombia	14–34	Chile
Tries: Garcia (2); Zuluaga; Goals: Linares (1)	report	Tries: Vasquez (2); Yao; Horvat; Altamirano; Sales; Goals: Horvat (5)

Estadio JB Londoño, Jericó
Referee: Andrew Pilkington (Spain)
Touch judges: Juan Blumetti (Argentina), Emiliano Rodriguez (Argentina)

Team details
Columbia		Position	Chile
Name	Number	Position	Number	Name
Carlos Mendoza	1	Fullback	1	Thomas Garrido
Jessue Guillot	2	Wing	2	Diego Quintul
Jesus Delgado	3	Centre	3	Zecil Yao
Ruben Zequeda	4	Centre	4	Felipe Aedo
David Perez	5	Wing	5	Juan Ortiz
Sebastian Martinez (c)	6	Five eighth	6	Christian Lopez
Hector Linares	7	Half back	7	James Horvat
Andres Jimenez	8	Prop forward	8	Ignacio Altamirano
Nelson Parada	9	Hooker	9	Mana Castillo-Sioni
Leonardo Delgado	10	Prop forward	10	Taylor Salas
Johnny Garcia	11	Second row	11	Jaime Santander
Fredy Diaz	12	Second row	12	Nick Doberer (c)
Andrew Zuluaga	13	Lock forward	13	Daniel Vasquez
Jean Villamil	14	Interchange	14	Moises Rojas
William Martinez	15	Interchange	15	Ferec Cabezas
Daniel Medina	16	Interchange
Juan David Espinal	17	Interchange

27 November 2022
15:30 COT (UTC-05:00)

Brazil	56–0	Colombia
Tries: Caetano (3); Ozzioli (3); Araujo; Paixao; Grundy; Dos Santos; Goals: Araujo (8)	report

Estadio JB Londoño, Jericó
Referee: Andrew Pilkington (Spain)
Touch judges: Hugo Pulido (Colombia), Emiliano Rodriguez (Argentina)

Team details
Brazil		Position	Columbia
Name	Number	Position	Number	Name
Ravi Araujo	1	Fullback	1	Jean Villamil
Marcos Paixao	2	Wing	2	Carlos Mendoza
Douglas Parazi	3	Centre	3	Jesus Delgado
Donovan Barreira	4	Centre	4	Sebastian Rodger
Felipe Dittz	5	Wing	5	Jessue Guillot
Victor Domingues	6	Five eighth	6	Sebastian Martinez
Zach Grundy	7	Half back	7	Hector Linares
Caio Ozzioli	8	Prop forward	8	Andres Jimenez
Lucas Domingues	9	Hooker	9	Nelson Parada
Alyfer Dos Santos	10	Prop forward	10	Leonardo Delgado
Leandro Cateano	11	Second row	11	John Garcia
Gabriel Saraiva	12	Second row	12	Fredy Diaz
Nicholas Sydorowitz	13	Lock forward	13	Andrew Zuluaga
Bruno Gil Melo	14	Interchange	14	Carlos Mendoza
Vinicius Parazi	15	Interchange	15	William Martinez
Diego Sanches Nogueira	16	Interchange	16	Daniel Medina
Luis Bussolo	17	Interchange	17	Victor Alegria
