= Whistler Secondary School =

Whistler Secondary
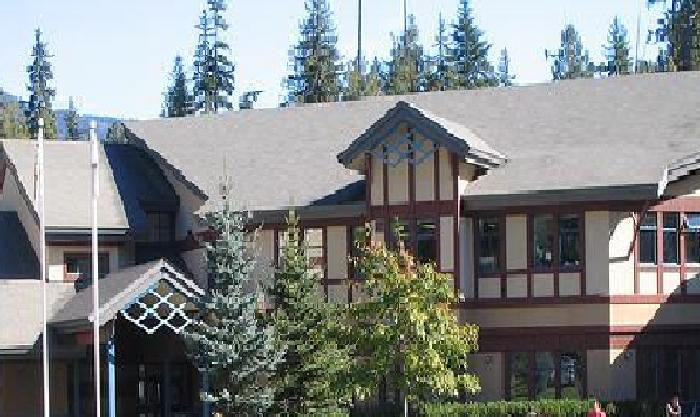

Location
- 8000 Alpine Way; Whistler, British Columbia, V0N 1B8; Canada; 50.1510°N 122.9606°W

Information
- School type: Public, high school
- Motto: Home of the Storm
- School board: School District 48 Sea to Sky
- School number: 4848022
- Principal: Robin Kirk
- Staff: 45
- Grades: 8-12
- Enrollment: 550 (September, 2022)
- Language: English and French
- Colour: Blue Yellow White
- Mascot: Zippy the lightning bolt
- Team name: Whistler Storm
- Website: sd48whistlersecondary.org

Whistler Secondary (or WSS) is a public high school in Whistler, British Columbia, and is part of School District 48 Sea to Sky. It is located opposite the subdivision of Alpine Meadows, north of the Whistler townsite adjacent to the Sea to Sky Highway. WSS was established in 1996 with a student capacity of 175 and was expanded to a 375 student capacity with a $3.3 million renovation in 2004.

== Athletics ==
Whistler Secondary has a long-held rivalry with Pemberton Secondary School in sports such as soccer, basketball and volleyball. Whistler Secondary also has a hockey and rugby team.

== Notable alumni ==
- Ashleigh McIvor, 2001 alumna, Former member of the Canadian Ski Cross team and Olympic Gold medalist.
- Julia Murray, 2006 alumna, Canadian Ski Cross team member
- Marielle Thompson, 2010 alumna, Canadian Ski Cross team member and Olympic Gold medalist.
- Finn Iles, 2017 alumnus, Canadian Downhill Mountain Bike team member.
- Broderick Thompson (alpine skier), 2012 alumnus, Canadian Olympic ski racer
- Merritt Patterson, 2008 alumnus, Film and TV actor
- Natalie Corless, 2021 alumnus, Canadian Olympic luge athlete
- Simon d'Artois, 2010 alumnus, Olympic Halfpipe skier
- Sean Pettit, 2010 alumnus, 2013 X games silver medalist, freeskier
- Mercedes Nicoll, 2001 alumnus, freestyle snowboarder
