= School District 48 Sea to Sky =

School district in British Columbia, Canada

School District No.48 Sea to Sky
- School District 48 Sea to Sky logo

Location
- Squamish Whistler, Squamish, Pemberton in Metro/Coast Canada

District information
- Superintendent: Chris Nicholson
- Schools: 16

Students and staff
- Students: 4328

Other information
- Website: http://sd48seatosky.org/

School District No. 48 (Sea to Sky) is a school district in British Columbia, Canada. The school district serves three major population centres along the Sea-to-Sky Corridor; Squamish, Whistler and Pemberton. The District also serves six Aboriginal communities: Skwxwú7mesh Uxwumixw, Lil’wat Nation, N’Quatqua, Samhquam Ucwalmicw, Skatin Nations, Xa’xtsa, as well as the Métis, Inuit and Off-Reserve Aboriginal Nations. There are 16 schools in the school district.

== Schools ==
School	Location	Grades
Blackwater Creek Elementary School	D'Arcy	K-3
Brackendale Elementary School	Brackendale	K-6
Don Ross Middle School	Brackendale	7-9
Garibaldi Highlands Elementary School	Garibaldi Highlands	K-6
Howe Sound Continuing Education	Squamish	12
Howe Sound Outreach School	Squamish	10-12
Howe Sound Secondary School	Squamish	10-12
Mamquam Elementary School	Garibaldi Highlands	K-6
Myrtle Philip Community School	Whistler	K-7
Pemberton Secondary School	Pemberton	8-12
Signal Hill Elementary School	Pemberton	K-7
Spring Creek Community School	Whistler	K-7
Squamish Elementary School	Squamish	K-6
Sta'7mes School	Squamish	K-12
Valleycliffe Elementary School	Squamish	K-6
Whistler Secondary School	Whistler	8-12

== See also ==
- List of school districts in British Columbia
