= Squamish, British Columbia =

Municipality in Canada

Squamish Sḵwx̱wú7mesh
- District municipality
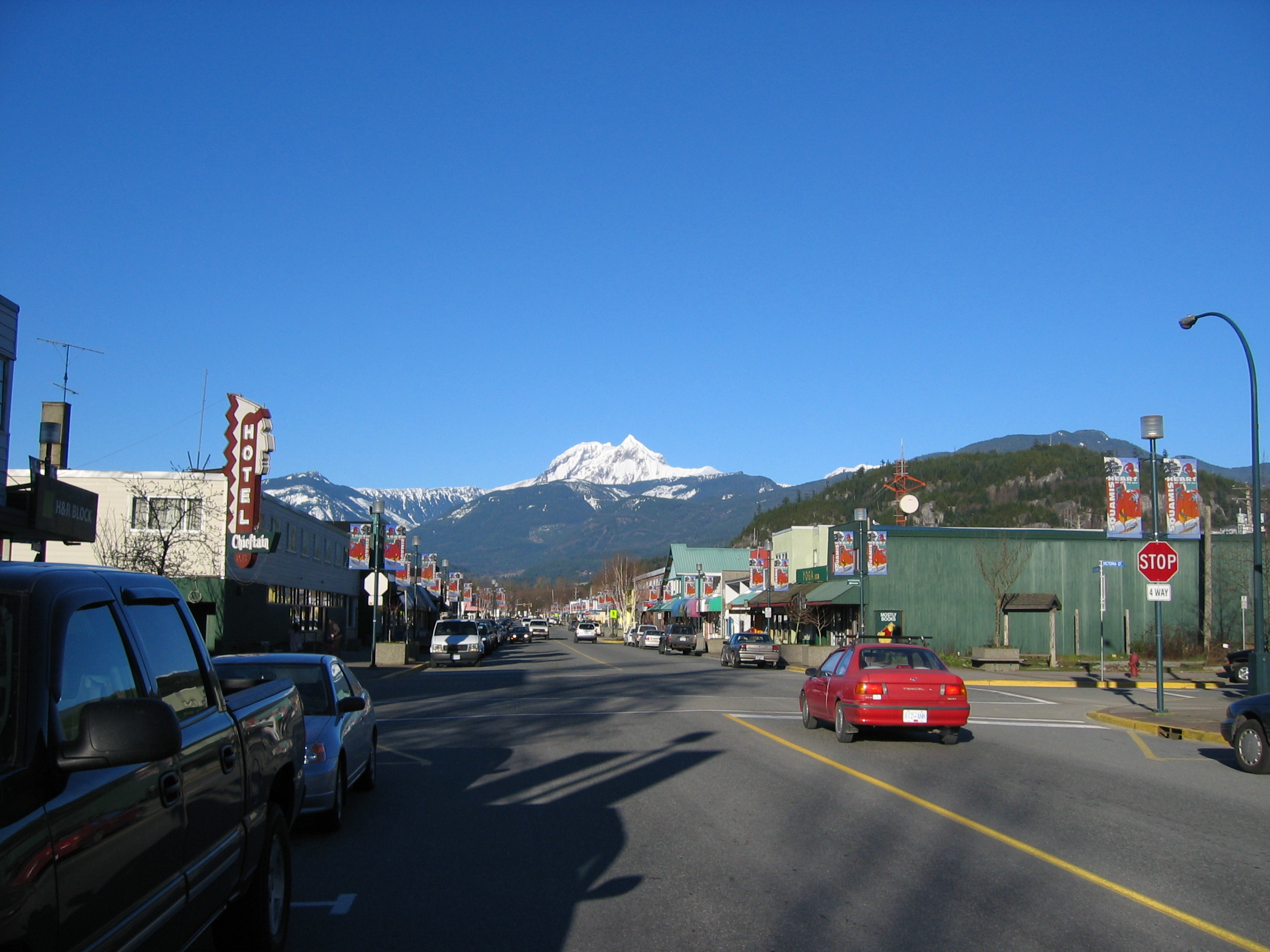
- Cleveland Avenue in Squamish with Mount Garibaldi looming in the background

- Logo
- Nickname: Squampton
- Location of Squamish in British Columbia Squamish (Canada)
- Coordinates: 49°42′06″N 123°09′32″W
- Country: Canada
- Province: British Columbia
- Region: Howe Sound/Sea to Sky Country
- Regional District: Squamish-Lillooet Regional District

Government
  - Type: Elected council
  - Mayor: Armand V. Hurford
  - Governing body: Squamish Council
  - MP: Patrick Weiler
  - MLA: Jeremy Valeriote

Area
  - Total: 104.88 km^{2} (40.49 sq mi)
- Elevation: 5 m (16 ft)

Population (2021)
  - Total: 23,819
  - Density: 186.1/km^{2} (482/sq mi)
- Demonym(s): Squamisher, Squamster, Squamite, Squamishite, Squamolian
- Time zone: UTC−07:00 (PT)
- Forward sortation area: V8B
- Area code: 604
- Website: squamish.ca

Squamish (/ˈskwɔːmɪʃ/; [ˈsqʷχʷuː.ʔməʃ]; 2021 census population 23,819) is a community and a district municipality in the Canadian province of British Columbia, located at the north end of Howe Sound on the Sea to Sky Highway. The population of the Squamish census agglomeration is 24,232. This includes First Nation reserves of the Squamish Nation although they are not governed by the municipality.

The Indigenous Squamish people have lived in the area for thousands of years. The town of Squamish had its beginning during the construction of the Pacific Great Eastern Railway in the 1910s. It was the first southern terminus of that railway (now a part of CN). The town remains important in the operations of the line and also the port. Forestry has traditionally been the main industry in the area, and the town's largest employer was the pulp mill operated by Western Forest Products. However, Western's operations in Squamish permanently ceased on January 26, 2006. Before the pulp mill, the town's largest employer had been International Forest Products (Interfor) with its sawmill and logging operation, but it closed a few years prior to the pulp mill's closing. In recent years, Squamish has become popular with Vancouver and Whistler residents escaping the increased cost of living in those places, both less than one hour away by highway. Tourism is increasingly important in the town's economy, with an emphasis on outdoor recreation.

== Squamish people ==
The Squamish people are an Indigenous people whose homeland includes the present day area of Squamish, British Columbia. Oral stories and archaeological evidence show that they have lived there for thousands of years. The name Keh Kait was the traditional name for the site of downtown Squamish.

== Activities ==
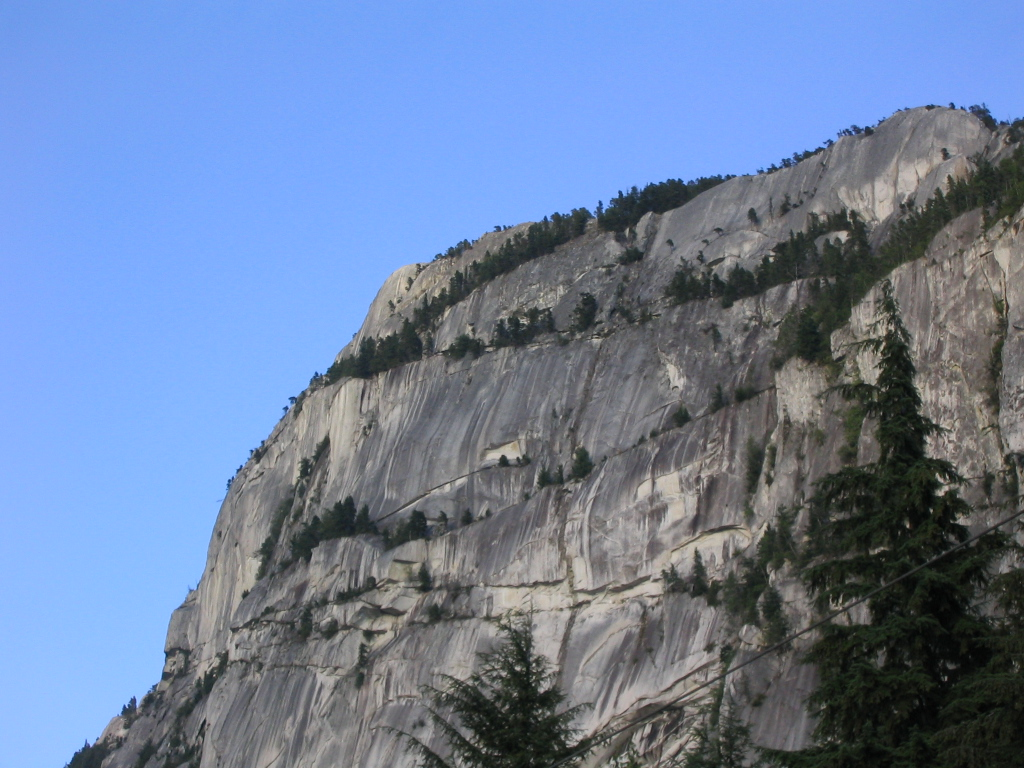
The Stawamus Chief

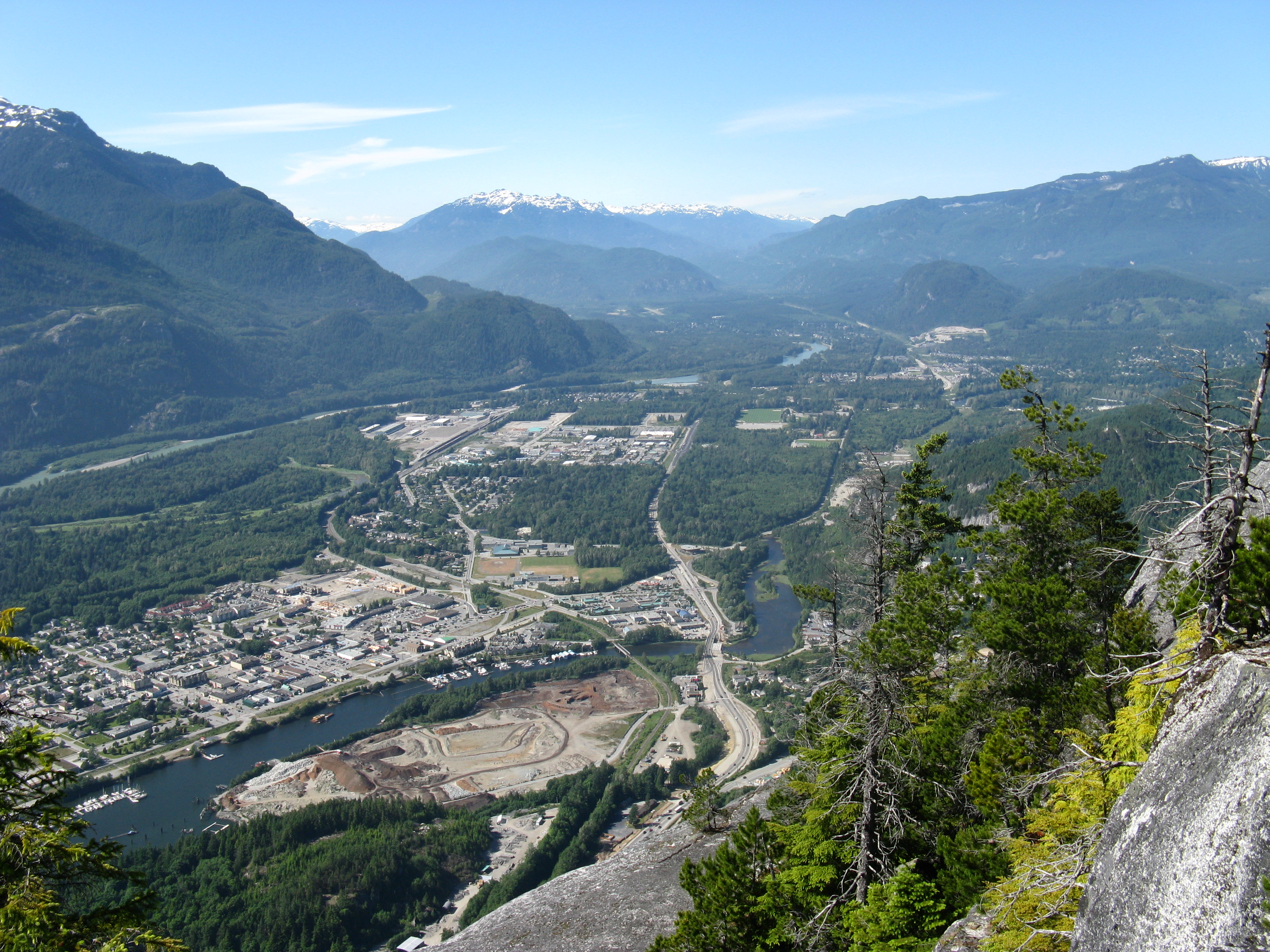
Squamish and the Squamish Valley from the summit of the Chief

Squamish is known for mountain biking, hiking, climbing, kiteboarding, and more.

Attractions include the Stawamus Chief, a huge cliff-faced granite massif favoured by rock climbers. As well as over 300 climbing routes on the Chief proper, a majority of which require traditional climbing protection, there are steep hiking trails around the back to access the three peaks that make up the massif, all giving views of Howe Sound and the surrounding Coast Mountains. In all, between Shannon Falls, Murrin Park, The Malamute, and the Smoke Bluffs, there are over 1500 rock-climbing routes in the Squamish area (and another 300 or so climbs north of Squamish on the road to Whistler). In recent years, Squamish has also become a major destination for bouldering, with over 2500 problems described in the local guidebook.

Kiteboarding and windsurfing are popular water sports in Squamish during the summer. Predictable wind on warm sunny days makes the Squamish Spit a top kiteboarding location in western Canada.

Squamish's extensive quality trail system is a key feature of an annual 50-mile ultramarathon, the Squamish 50. Solo runners and relay teams run on many of the same trails as the Test of Metal, and pass through Alice Lake Provincial Park and the campus of Capilano University (formerly Quest University). "The Double" is an award offered annually to the participant with the fastest combined time for both the Test of Metal and Squamish 50.

From 1974 to 1999, Squamish served as the terminus for the Royal Hudson steam excursion train. The train was pulled by the restored ex-Canadian Pacific No. 2860 and ran from North Vancouver on Howe Sound, until it reached Squamish. The train significantly boosted tourism in the region. Due to issues with No. 2860, back up locomotives were used to pull the train from 2000-2001, including No. 3716 and diesel locomotive No. 4069, until the train was phased out and no longer was running.

Other tourist attractions in Squamish include Shannon Falls waterfall; river-rafting on the Elaho and Squamish rivers; snowmobiling on nearby Brohm Ridge; and bald eagle viewing in the community of Brackendale, which has one of North America's largest populations of bald eagles. Squamish is also a popular destination among Greater Vancouver hikers, mountaineers and backcountry skiers, who visit the large provincial parks in the surrounding Coast Mountains.

== Politics ==
The current mayor of Squamish is Armand Hurford, who won the 2022 election, after having served as a council member. Previous mayors have included Karen Elliot (2018-2022); Patricia Heintzman (2014-2018); Rob Kirkham (2011-2014); Greg Gardner (2008-2011); Ian Sutherland (2002–2008) among others. Current council members are Lauren Greenlaw, Eric Andersen, John French, Andrew Hamilton, Chris Pettingill, and Jenna Stoner. The municipality is part of the Squamish-Lillooet Regional District.

Squamish federal election results
Year	Liberal		Conservative		New Democratic		Green	
2021	33%	3,852	22%	2,556	32%	3,816	9%	1,065
2019	34%	3,775	18%	2,023	17%	1,927	29%	3,225

Squamish provincial election results
Year	New Democratic		Liberal		Green	
2020	34%	2,989	28%	2,432	38%	3,357
2017	37%	3,079	33%	2,790	28%	2,352

On the provincial level, Squamish is in the West Vancouver-Sea to Sky electoral district. The current MLA is Jeremy Valeriote (BC Green Party). He was elected in the 2024 provincial election after running and losing to Jordan Sturdy (BC Liberal Party) in the 2020 provincial election by 41 votes.

Federally, Squamish is a part of the West Vancouver—Sunshine Coast—Sea to Sky Country electoral district. It is represented by Patrick Weiler of the Liberal Party of Canada, who took office after the 2019 Canadian federal election.

== Education ==
Squamish has five English language public elementary schools: Brackendale Elementary, Garibaldi Highlands Elementary, Mamquam Elementary, Squamish Elementary, and Valleycliffe Elementary. Under the Sea to Sky Learning Connections, the public schools district also manages Sea to Sky Online, Sea to Sky Alternative, Cultural Journeys, and Learning Expeditions. The Conseil scolaire francophone de la Colombie-Britannique operates one Francophone primary school in that city: the école Les Aiglons. There are two public secondary schools – Howe Sound Secondary School and Don Ross Middle School – as well as the board office for School District 48 Howe Sound.

Squamish hosts three private schools: Squamish Montessori Elementary School, Cedar Valley Waldorf School, and Coast Mountain Academy for grades 7 through 12. Coast Mountain Academy is located next to Capilano University's Squamish campus.

Capilano University offers post-secondary education through its Squamish campus, including diploma programs and university transfer courses. It bought the campus of Quest University, which opened in September 2007 and closed in April 2023, and was Canada's first private, non-profit, secular university.

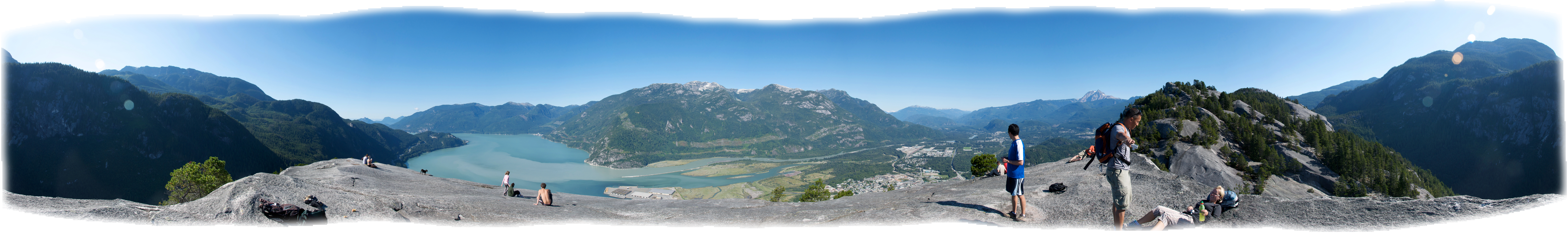
A panorama from the summit of the Stawamus Chief in Squamish

== Society and culture ==
Squamish is home to a variety of faiths. There are eleven churches and religious organizations, including several Christian denominations, as well as the Baháʼí Faith, and a Sikh temple.

The Squamish Public Library is located in the downtown area, on Second Avenue. It houses a collection of books, CDs, DVDs, and magazines. It has an art for loan collection and an online historical archive of various photographs, periodicals, and a library of things. Nearby museums include the Britannia Mine Museum and the Railway Museum of British Columbia.

In 1998, Squamish was briefly the home of the world's first unionized McDonald's franchise, although the union was decertified by the summer of 1999.

From 2010 until 2016, the municipality hosted the Squamish Valley Music Festival. Usually taking place in August, the event has hosted artists such as Eminem, Bruno Mars, Macklemore, and Arcade Fire.

== In media ==
Squamish has been a filming location for a number of media works and is a very popular place to film movies and TV shows. Examples include the films Free Willy 3: The Rescue (1997), Insomnia (2002), Before I Fall (2015), Walking Tall (2004), Chaos Theory (2008), The Twilight Saga: Breaking Dawn - Part 1 (2011), The 12 Disasters of Christmas (2012), Star Trek Beyond (2016), Woody Woodpecker (2018), the television series Men in Trees, The Guard, A&E's U.S. adaptation of The Returned, the Hallmark Channel's Aurora Teagarden mysteries, Netflix's Lost in Space reboot and Netflix's Virgin River. Sneaky Sasquatch, an Apple Arcade game, is also based there.

== Demographics ==
Historical population
Year	Pop.	±%
1981	10,272	—
1986	10,157	−1.1%
1991	11,709	+15.3%
1996	13,944	+19.1%
2001	14,247	+2.2%
2006	14,949	+4.9%
2011	17,158	+14.8%
2016	19,512	+13.7%
2021	23,819	+22.1%

In the 2021 Census of Population conducted by Statistics Canada, Squamish had a population of 23,819 living in 9,191 of its 9,906 total private dwellings, a change of 22.2% from its 2016 population of 19,497. With a land area of 104.71 km^{2} (40.43 sq mi), it had a population density of 227.5/km^{2} (589.2/sq mi) in 2021.

=== Ethnicity ===
Panethnic groups in the District of Squamish (1991−2021)
Panethnic group	2021		2016		2011		2006		2001		1996		1991	
Panethnic group	Pop.	%	Pop.	%	Pop.	%	Pop.	%	Pop.	%	Pop.	%	Pop.	%
European (Note: Statistic includes all persons that did not make up part of a visible minority or an indigenous identity.)	19,030	80.82%	15,355	80.35%	14,045	83.08%	11,990	80.55%	11,435	80.61%	12,045	86.44%	10,070	86.36%
South Asian	1,525	6.48%	1,295	6.78%	1,010	5.97%	1,675	11.25%	1,690	11.91%	1,245	8.93%	695	5.96%
Indigenous	920	3.91%	950	4.97%	685	4.05%	550	3.69%	360	2.54%	325	2.33%	665	5.7%
East Asian (Note: Statistic includes total responses of "Chinese", "Korean", and "Japanese" under visible minority section on census.)	735	3.12%	520	2.72%	280	1.66%	215	1.44%	305	2.15%	85	0.61%	85	0.73%
Southeast Asian (Note: Statistic includes total responses of "Filipino" and "Southeast Asian" under visible minority section on census.)	550	2.34%	635	3.32%	550	3.25%	265	1.78%	145	1.02%	80	0.57%	45	0.39%
Latin American	350	1.49%	120	0.63%	130	0.77%	95	0.64%	70	0.49%	70	0.5%	45	0.39%
Middle Eastern (Note: Statistic includes total responses of "West Asian" and "Arab" under visible minority section on census.)	165	0.7%	40	0.21%	25	0.15%	25	0.17%	10	0.07%	10	0.07%	15	0.13%
African	155	0.66%	120	0.63%	95	0.56%	40	0.27%	100	0.7%	80	0.57%	40	0.34%
Other/multiracial (Note: Statistic includes total responses of "Visible minority, n.i.e." and "Multiple visible minorities" under visible minority section on census.)	120	0.51%	75	0.39%	75	0.44%	25	0.17%	75	0.53%	0	0%	—N/a	—N/a
Total responses	23,545	98.85%	19,110	97.94%	16,905	98.53%	14,885	99.57%	14,185	99.56%	13,935	99.58%	11,660	99.58%
Total population	23,819	100%	19,512	100%	17,158	100%	14,949	100%	14,247	100%	13,994	100%	11,709	100%
Note: Totals greater than 100% due to multiple origin responses.

=== Religion ===
According to the 2021 census, religious groups in Squamish included:

- Irreligion (16,500 persons or 70.1%)
- Christianity (5,110 persons or 21.7%)
- Sikhism (1,260 persons or 5.4%)
- Islam (160 persons or 0.7%)
- Hinduism (90 persons or 0.4%)
- Judaism (70 persons or 0.3%)
- Buddhism (60 persons or 0.3%)
- Indigenous Spirituality (40 persons or 0.2%)

== Climate ==
Squamish has an oceanic climate (Cfb) with warm summers and moderately cold winters. Squamish is one of the wettest inhabited locations in Canada, with over 2,200 millimetres (87 in) of rainfall per year, often falling in long stretches through the winter.

Climate data for Squamish Airport, 1991–2020 normals, extremes 1960–present
Month	Jan	Feb	Mar	Apr	May	Jun	Jul	Aug	Sep	Oct	Nov	Dec	Year
Record high °C (°F)	13.5 (56.3)	20.0 (68.0)	25.9 (78.6)	31.5 (88.7)	37.4 (99.3)	43.0 (109.4)	37.7 (99.9)	40.2 (104.4)	38.2 (100.8)	29.5 (85.1)	17.5 (63.5)	15.2 (59.4)	43.0 (109.4)
Mean daily maximum °C (°F)	4.5 (40.1)	7.6 (45.7)	10.4 (50.7)	14.5 (58.1)	18.9 (66.0)	21.1 (70.0)	24.5 (76.1)	24.5 (76.1)	20.7 (69.3)	13.9 (57.0)	7.6 (45.7)	3.8 (38.8)	14.3 (57.7)
Daily mean °C (°F)	1.8 (35.2)	3.8 (38.8)	5.9 (42.6)	9.1 (48.4)	13.1 (55.6)	15.7 (60.3)	18.5 (65.3)	18.4 (65.1)	15.0 (59.0)	9.7 (49.5)	4.7 (40.5)	1.4 (34.5)	9.8 (49.6)
Mean daily minimum °C (°F)	−0.9 (30.4)	0.0 (32.0)	1.3 (34.3)	3.7 (38.7)	7.2 (45.0)	10.3 (50.5)	12.4 (54.3)	12.2 (54.0)	9.3 (48.7)	5.4 (41.7)	1.7 (35.1)	−1.0 (30.2)	5.1 (41.2)
Record low °C (°F)	−20.6 (−5.1)	−16.2 (2.8)	−9.1 (15.6)	−4.1 (24.6)	−1.0 (30.2)	3.3 (37.9)	4.8 (40.6)	5.0 (41.0)	0.8 (33.4)	−6.7 (19.9)	−15.8 (3.6)	−20.0 (−4.0)	−20.6 (−5.1)
Average precipitation mm (inches)	379.1 (14.93)	195.2 (7.69)	245.5 (9.67)	149.6 (5.89)	87.9 (3.46)	66.9 (2.63)	47.5 (1.87)	54.0 (2.13)	125.0 (4.92)	270.8 (10.66)	383.0 (15.08)	339.6 (13.37)	2,344.1 (92.29)
Average snowfall cm (inches)	25.9 (10.2)	13.1 (5.2)	8.1 (3.2)	0.1 (0.0)	0.0 (0.0)	0.0 (0.0)	0.0 (0.0)	0.0 (0.0)	0.0 (0.0)	0.0 (0.0)	9.2 (3.6)	30.6 (12.0)	87.0 (34.3)
Average precipitation days (≥ 0.2 mm)	20.4	16.5	20.0	17.4	14.1	12.8	8.8	8.2	11.9	18.9	21.2	21.0	191.0
Average snowy days (≥ 0.2 cm)	4.3	2.0	1.1	0.05	0.0	0.0	0.0	0.0	0.0	0.0	1.8	4.1	13.3
Average relative humidity (%) (at 15:00 LST)	83.8	69.2	64.5	55.9	53.3	56.3	52.1	53.3	60.7	73.0	84.4	86.7	66.1
Source: Environment Canada (snow 1981–2010)

== Industry ==
Carbon Engineering, a company focusing on the commercialization of direct air capture technology, is headquartered in Squamish.

A $5.1 billion electric liquefied natural gas export facility is being built in the area.

== Transit ==
Public transportation is provided by the Squamish Transit System; this service is free over the summer to students at school age (elementary and secondary).

Regional flights are operated from Squamish Airport (YSE).

Bus service to Vancouver and Vancouver International Airport (YVR) is provided by YVR Skylynx.

== Neighbourhoods ==
Neighbourhoods of Squamish include:

- Brackendale
- Valleycliffe
- Downtown Squamish
- Dentville
- Northyards
- Garibaldi Highlands
- Garibaldi Estates

== Notable people ==
- Sarah Burke, freestyle skier; resided in Squamish;
- Ian Campbell, Indigenous Canadian politician; one of the Hereditary Chiefs of Squamish Nation;
- Mike Carney, realtor; a former ski racer who had been a member of the Canadian Olympic downhill ski team;
- Daniel Cudmore, actor who starred in the X-Men film series, and The Twilight Saga film series
- Joe Eppele, football player; drafted by Toronto Argonauts in 2010 as an offensive linesman;
- Grimes, musician; lived in Squamish while recording her fourth studio album, Art Angels;
- Maëlle Ricker, Olympian; Canadian Olympic gold medalist at the 2010 Vancouver Winter Games in the Snowboard Cross
- Mike Sweeney, soccer player; competed in the 1984 Summer Olympics with Team Canada;
- Mikayla Martin, 2018 Ski Cross Junior World Champion;
- Squamish Five, an anarchist urban guerrilla group who lived and were arrested in the area
- Marc-André Leclerc, rock climber and alpinist. Known for his solo ascents of numerous mountains in several parts of the world.
- Jackson Goldstone, well known professional mountain biker who competes in the downhill world championship is from Squamish.

== Sister cities ==
Squamish has a sister city arrangement with the following city:

- Shimizu, Shizuoka, Japan

== See also ==
- List of francophone communities in British Columbia
