= Ashleigh McIvor =

Canadian freestyle skier (born 1983)

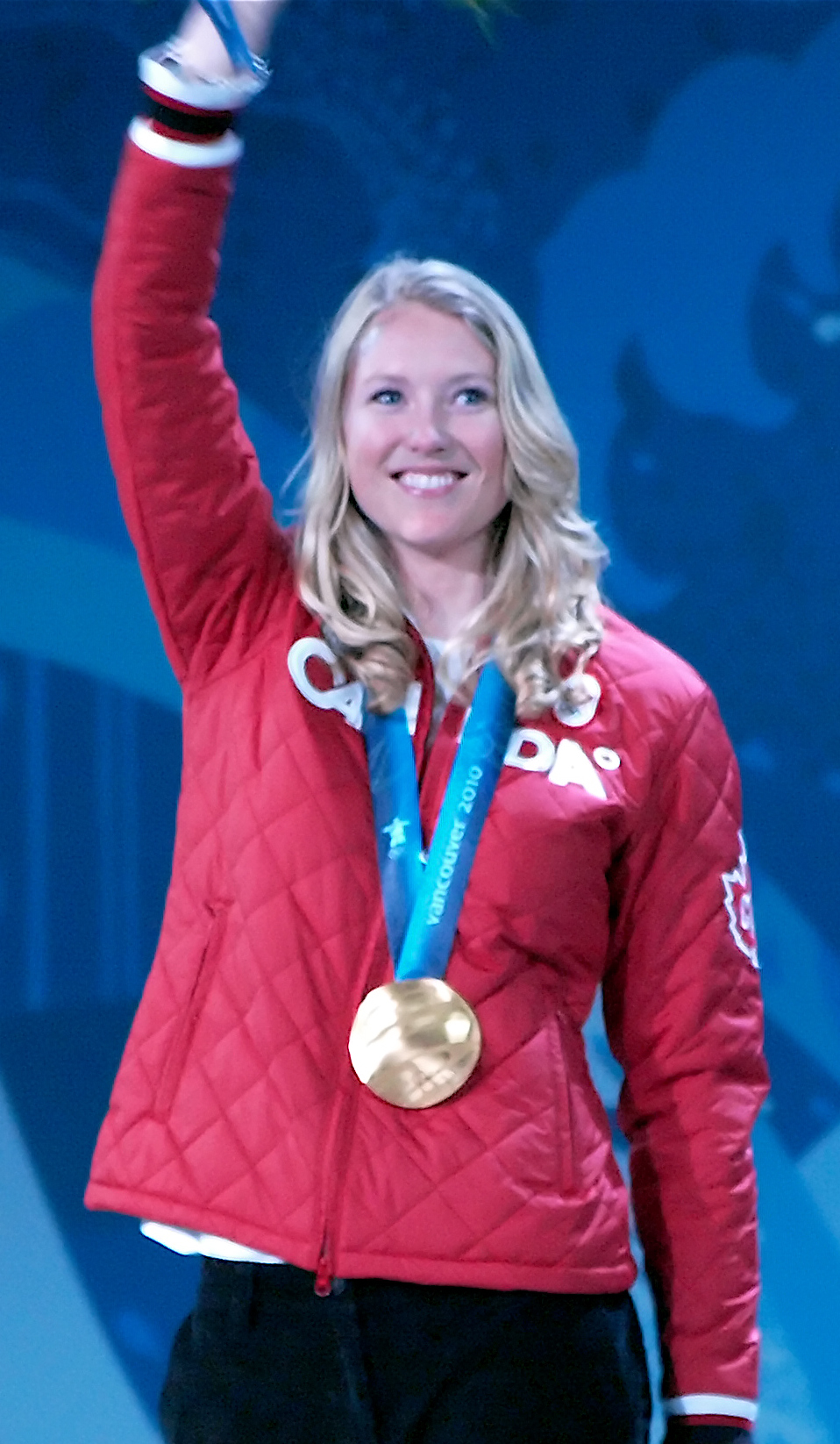
- McIvor at the 2010 Winter Olympics

Personal information
- Born: 15 September 1983 (age 43) Vancouver, British Columbia, Canada

Sport
- Sport: Skiing
- Club: Whistler Mountain SC

World Cup career
- Seasons: 5 – (2005, 2008–2011)
- Indiv. starts: 28
- Indiv. podiums: 11
- Indiv. wins: 1
- Overall titles: 0 – (7th in 2010)
- Discipline titles: 0
Medal record
Women's freestyle skiing
Representing Canada
Olympic Games
Gold medal – first place	2010 Vancouver	Ski cross
World Championships
Gold medal – first place	2009 Inawashiro	Ski cross
X Games
Silver medal – second place	2010 Aspen	Ski cross

Ashleigh McIvor DeMerit (born September 15, 1983) is a Canadian retired freestyle skier currently residing in Whistler, British Columbia. McIvor was a member of the Canadian national ski cross team and became the first gold medal winner of women's ski cross at the 2010 Winter Olympics. She is also a former world champion in ski cross and has a second-place finish at the Winter X Games to her credit as well.

== Career ==
McIvor entered ski cross at a young age, and dominated the North American pro tour. As one of the youngest on the World Cup circuit, Ashleigh finished on the podium in her first World Cup race. McIvor has participated with fashion photographers, modeled on runways, and secured major sportswear sponsorships because of her popularity.

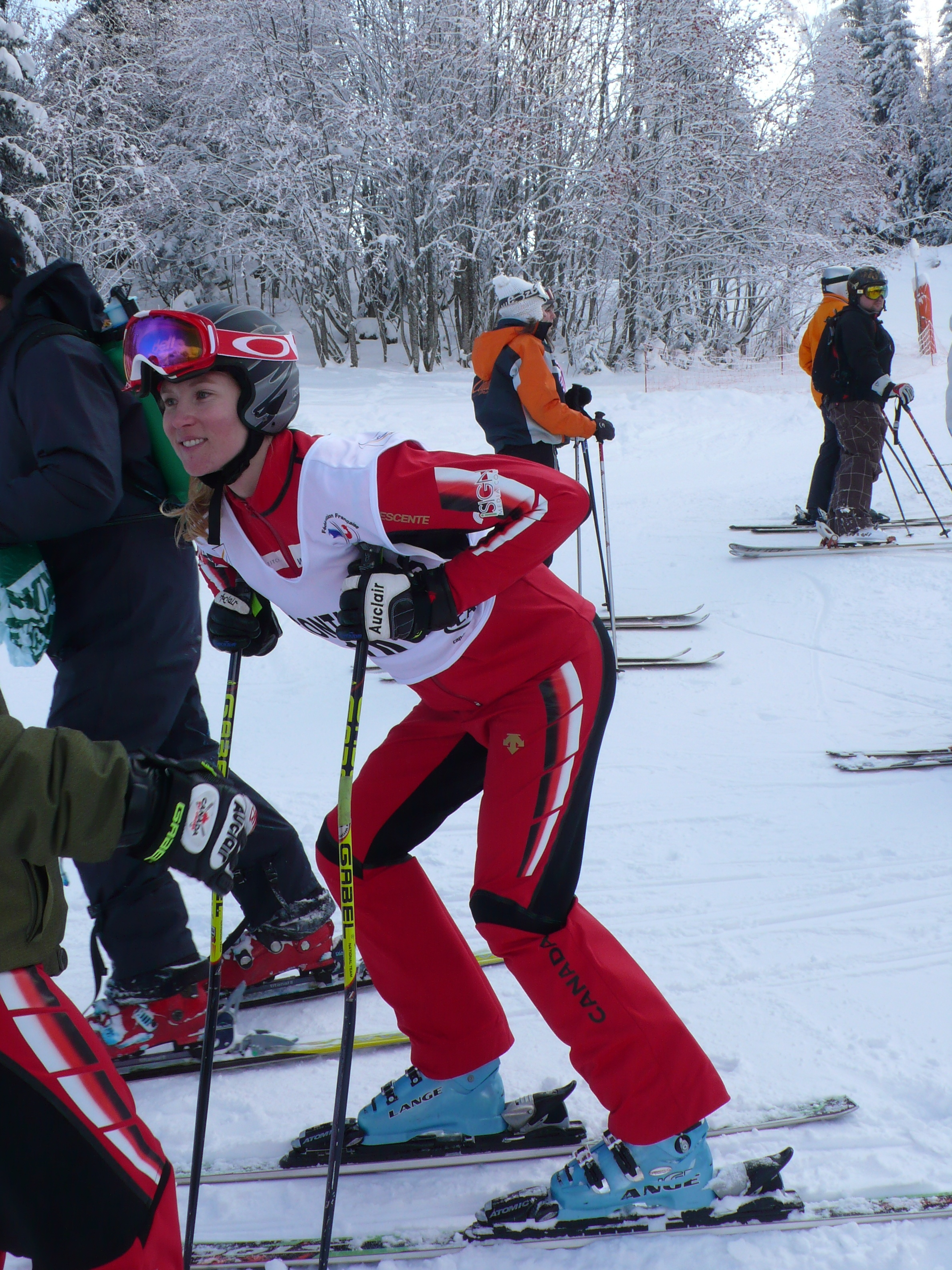
McIvor on the World Cup stop in Les Contamines

McIvor started competing in 2003. McIvor won her first World Championship in 2009 at Inawashiro, Japan. She has been to four Winter X-Games, with her best finish being a silver medal in 2010. She also has eleven podium finishes on the FIS World Cup circuit to her credit, including a silver medal at Cypress Mountain in 2009, the site of the Vancouver Olympic Games. McIvor finished third overall on the 2008-09 FIS World Cup season, and second overall in the 2009–2010 season.

Prior to the Winter Olympics, McIvor attended the 2010 Winter X Games as a final tuneup event. It was there that she and fellow countrywoman Kelsey Serwa managed to finish second and third respectively to Ophélie David. McIvor's silver was her first X Games medal of any colour.

McIvor was a member of Canada's freestyle skiing team at the Vancouver Olympics where ski-cross was making its debut as an official medal event. Ashleigh McIvor qualified for the medal round with the second fastest time. In the finals McIvor got out to a fast start and won with some distance between herself and Hedda Berntsen. With the win McIvor won the first ever Olympic gold medal for ladies' ski cross.

During the next season, McIvor suffered her second catastrophic ACL injury in her knee, ending her season while on a practice run at the Winter X Games. In part to the injuries McIvor retired from competitive skiing in the fall of 2012, she said that "I've gone back and forth in my mind, wondering if I'm making the right decision to retire. But I've already done more in the sport than I ever imagined would be possible and there's something to be said for going out on top, as the reigning Olympic champion."

== Personal life ==
Ashleigh graduated from Whistler Secondary School in 2001. She studied Business/Marketing at the University of British Columbia. In 2012, she was named by Sportsnet Magazine as one of the 30 Most Beautiful Athletes on the Planet. McIvor married Jay DeMerit in 2013, the former captain of the Vancouver Whitecaps FC. The couple have a son together, Oakes.
