= Howe Sound Secondary School =

Howe Sound Secondary
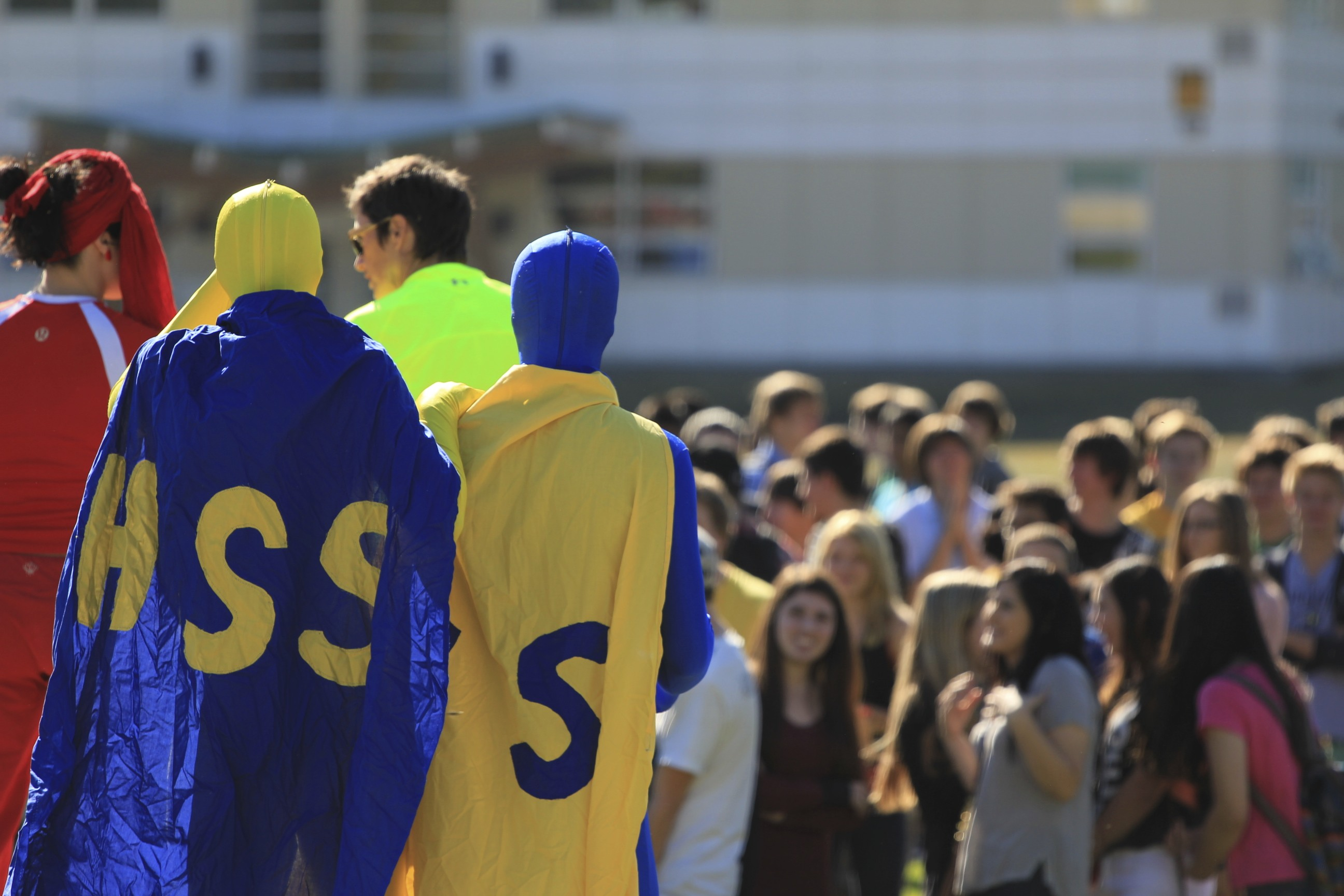

Location
- PO Box 99; Squamish, British Columbia, V8B 0A1; Canada; 49.70687°N 123.15117°W

Information
- School type: Public, high school
- School board: School District 48 Howe Sound
- Superintendent: Lisa McCullough
- Area trustee: Rick Price, Andrea Beaubien, Laura Godfrey
- School number: 4848004
- Administrator: Evelyn Carson-McLeod
- Principal: Ms. Erin Boisvert
- Staff: 60
- Grades: 10-12
- Enrollment: 643 (May 2013)
- Language: English
- Area: Squamish
- Colours: Royal Blue and Gold
- Team name: Sounders
- Website: sd48howesound.org

Howe Sound Secondary is a public Secondary school in Squamish, British Columbia part of School District 48 Howe Sound. It is the largest school in the district, and is one of 2 schools in Squamish to offer grades 10–12.

== History ==
A new building was erected in the 1950s. In 1996 a new gymnasium was added and other renovations were undertaken.

=== Lawsuit ===
The 1996 addition suffered problems of water infiltration that culminated in a notable decision by the Supreme Court of British Columbia. Following substantial completion of the project in the fall of 1996, problems of water ingress in the crawlspace, walls, and skylights were discovered. The architect and contractor continued to address the problems for several years. In September 2003 the school district began legal proceedings against the architects for the alleged problems. This resulted in the 2007 court decision, The Board of School Trustees of School District No. 48 (Howe Sound) v. Killick Metz Bowen Rose Architects and Planners Inc. et al. The decision held that the standard architect-client contract limiting the term of the architect's liability to six years following substantial completion was valid, and as the school district took more than six years to take legal action, the architect's liability had expired. The case was dismissed and costs awarded to the architects.

== Notable alumni ==
- Mike Sweeney (played in FIFA World Cup)
- Mike Carney (Olympic ski racer)
- Sarah Burke (HSAS) (freestyle skiing) (World Champion freestyle skier, Olympic freestyle innovator)
- Jamie Cudmore (HSAS) (rugby) (3 time Rugby World Cup Canadian rep 2003, 2007, 2011)
- Jackson Goldstone (Downhill mountain bike racer, 2021 UCI Mountain Bike World Championships in Val di Sole, Italy and, the 2022 Junior World Cup overall title. September 11, 2022, Goldstone won the RedBull Hardline in Dyfi, Wales. Goldstone completed the revamped Hardline course in two minutes and twenty seconds, finishing six-and-a-half seconds clear of Joe Smith in second place. At 18 years old, Goldstone is the event's youngest winner. Team Santa Cruz Syndicate and sponsored by Redbull)
