= 2024 South American Rugby League Championship =

- Host country: Argentina
- Winner: Chile (1st title)

The 2024 South American Rugby League Championship was the fourth edition of the tournament and was held in Buenos Aires, Argentina between 29 November and 1 December 2024. The teams participating in the tournament were Argentina, Brazil, and Chile. Brazil were the defending two time champions.

Chile won the tournament on points difference, while splitting their games.

== Participants ==
Team	Captain	Coach	Previous Apps	Previous best result	World Ranking (Note: IRL World Rankings are as of June 2024.)
Brazil	Alcino Amato	Caio Ozzioli	3	Champions (2018, 2022)	33
Chile	Nick Doberer	Andrew Charles	3	Champions (2017) (Note: Part of the Latin American Rugby League Championship in 2017)	23
Argentina	Leonardo Barrera	Pablo Leccadito	1	Runner-Up (2018)	49

== Table ==
Pos	Team	Pld	W	D	L	PF	PA	PD	Pts
1	Chile (C)	2	1	0	1	74	54	+20	2
2	Argentina	2	1	0	1	56	58	-2	2
3	Brazil	2	1	0	1	50	70	-20	2

== Fixtures ==
Friday, 29 November 2024
11:00 ART (UTC-03:00)

Brazil
Tries: Jorge Cabral

Ivan Mancini Jonathan Patez Alyfer Viniciu
Goals: Zach Grundy (2/3) Alcino Amato (1/1)

22–44
Report:

Chile
Tries: Brandon Tobar (3)

Nick Doberer (2) Thomas Garrido Luis Pizarro Daniel Polanco
Goals: Mitchell Black (6/8)

Camioneros Escobar Rugby Club
Referee: Emiliano Rodriguez (Argentina)

Saturday, 30 November 2024
14:30 ART (UTC-03:00)

Argentina
Tries: Lucas Balza

Lucas Escobar Ulises Silva Gabriel Stasiewicz
Goals: Rodrigo Molina (3/4)

22–28
Report:

Brazil
Tries: Jorge Cabral

Fabio Lopes Jose Ivan Mancini Bruno Gil Melo Alyfer Vinicius
Goals: Zach Grundy (4/5)

Camioneros Escobar Rugby Club
Referee: Juan Blumetti (Argentina)

Sunday, 1 December 2024
15:30 ART (UTC-03:00)

Chile
Tries: Santiago Gabarruz

Camilo Mauro Lucas Escobar Ulises Silva
Goals: Santiago Villar (3/4) Lucas Balza (1/2)

30–32
Report:

Argentina
Tries: Nick Doberer

Felipe Aedo Mitchell Black Thomas Garrido
Goals: Mitchell Black (5/5)

Camioneros Escobar Rugby Club
Referee: Juan Blumetti (Argentina)
