= Argentina rugby team =

Argentina rugby team may refer to:

- Argentina national rugby union team
- Argentina national rugby league team
