= Argentina women's national rugby league team =

Team information
- IRL ranking: NR (31 December 2025)

Team results
- First international
- Brazil 48-0 Argentina
- Biggest defeat
- Brazil 48-0 Argentina

The Argentina women's national team are a rugby league team represent Argentina internationally. They played their first international against Brazil in 2018, losing 48–0. In December 2022, Argentina appeared at 22nd in the world rankings, but dropped to 28th a year later and as of 2025 they are no longer ranked.

== Results ==
Date	Score (Note: Argentina score given first)	Opponent	Tournament	Venue	Video	Report(s)
26 October 2018	0–48	Brazil	2018 South American Cup	Clube de Campo do Palmeiras, São Paulo	—	—
