= Alberta Rugby League =

- Sport: Rugby league
- Number of teams: 3
- Country: Alberta, Canada (Canada Rugby League)

The Alberta Rugby League (or the ARLC) is a domestic rugby league football competition in Alberta, Canada operated by the Canada Rugby League.

== Clubs ==
Team
Calgary Cowboys
Calgary Crusaders
Edmonton

== See also ==
- British Columbia Rugby League
- Ontario Rugby League
- Rugby league in Canada
