= Mike Sweeney (soccer) =

Canadian soccer player (born 1959)

Personal information
- Full name: Michael Sweeney
- Date of birth: December 25, 1959 (age 66)
- Place of birth: Duncan, British Columbia, Canada
- Height: 1.70 m (5 ft 7 in)
- Positions: Midfielder; defender

Youth career
- Squamish United

College career
Years	Team	Apps	(Gls)
- Simon Fraser

Senior career*
Years	Team	Apps	(Gls)
1980–1982	Edmonton Drillers	86	(2)
1980–1982	Edmonton Drillers (indoor)	26	(10)
1983–1984	Vancouver Whitecaps	22	(0)
1984	Golden Bay Earthquakes	21	(2)
1984–1987	Cleveland Force (indoor)	87	(18)
1987–1988	Minnesota Strikers (indoor)	54	(21)
1988–1989	Baltimore Blast (indoor)	44	(6)
1988	Toronto Blizzard	27	(1)
1989–1992	Cleveland Crunch (indoor)	92	(29)
1988–1990	Boston Bolts		(8)

International career
1980–1993	Canada	61	(1)
Medal record
Representing Canada
Men's Association football
CONCACAF Championship
Winner	1985 North America
North American Nations Cup
Winner	1990 Canada
- * Club domestic league appearances and goals

Michael Sweeney (born December 25, 1959) is a Canadian former soccer player. In 2012, as part of the Canadian Soccer Association's centennial celebration, he was named to the all-time Canada XI men's team.

== Early years ==
Sweeney spent several years with the youth club, Squamish United, and graduated from Howe Sound Secondary School. He then made the roster at Simon Fraser University as a walk-on, later working his way onto the Canadian squad for the 1978 CONCACAF Youth Tournament.

== Club career ==
=== NASL ===
In 1980, the Edmonton Drillers of the North American Soccer League signed Sweeney. He spent three seasons with the Drillers before moving to the Vancouver Whitecaps for the 1983 season. While he began the 1984 season with the Whitecaps, he was traded to the Golden Bay Earthquakes. The NASL folded at the end of the 1984 season.

=== MISL ===
Sweeney was also a long-time Cleveland Force MISL player. He then moved to the Minnesota Strikers for the 1987–1988 season. He then moved to the Baltimore Blast. In 1989, the Cleveland Crunch selected Sweeney in the Expansion Draft. On June 30, 1989, he signed with the Crunch and remained with the team through at least the 1991–1992 season.

=== Toronto Blizzard ===
In 1988, Sweeney spent time with the Toronto Blizzard of the Canadian Soccer League (CSL).

=== Boston Bolts ===
In 1988, he signed with the Boston Bolts of the American Soccer League (ASL). In 1990, the ASL merged with the Western Soccer League to form the American Professional Soccer League (APSL). The Bolts spent one season, 1990, in the APSL before folding.

The Canadian Soccer Hall of Fame inducted Sweeney in 2002.

== International career ==
A defender or midfielder, Sweeney made his senior debut on 17 September 1980 for Canada in a 3–0 victory against New Zealand in a friendly match in Edmonton. In total, he earned 61 caps, scoring one goal. He represented Canada in 24 FIFA World Cup qualification matches and played two of Canada's games at the 1986 FIFA World Cup finals, the country's first appearance at a World Cup finals. Sweeney was sent off in the second game against Hungary, currently the only Canadian player to be dismissed at a World Cup Finals tournament (none were dismissed when Canada next appeared in 2022 and 2026).

He also played for Canada at the 1984 Olympics and was a squad member at the 1979 FIFA World Youth Championship but did not play.

His final international game was a 15 August 1993 World Cup qualification match against Australia in Sydney.

=== International goals ===
Scores and results list Canada's goal tally first.

#	Date	Venue	Opponent	Score	Result	Competition
1	April 13, 1985	Royal Athletic Park, Victoria, Canada	Haiti	2–0	2–0	1986 FIFA World Cup qualification

== Honours ==
Canada

- CONCACAF Championship: 1985
- North American Nations Cup: 1990
