= Ontario Rugby League =

- Sport: Rugby league
- Instituted: 2010
- Inaugural season: 2010
- Number of teams: 9 (6 men's, 3 women's)
- Country: Ontario, Canada (Canada Rugby League)
- Premiers: Tavistock Trash Pandas (2026)
- Most titles: Scarborough Centurions (6 titles)

The Ontario Rugby League (or the ORL) is a domestic rugby league football competition in Ontario, Canada, operated by the Canada Rugby League. As of summer 2025, it has seven clubs: Brantford Broncos, Brampton Beavers, Durham Dawgs, Royal City Goons, Toronto City Saints & the Tavistock Trash Pandas, plus a couple of women's sides.

== Teams ==
=== Current clubs ===
==== Men's Championship ====
Team	Stadium	Capacity	City/Area
Brantford Broncos	Brantford, ON	200	Brantford
Brampton Beavers	Stratford Legion, ON	200	Brampton
Durham Dawgs	Pickering, ON	N/A	Durham
Royal City Goons	Guelph, ON		
Toronto City Saints	Lamport Stadium, Toronto	9,600	Toronto
Tavistock Trash Pandas	Various		Tavistock

==== Women's Championship ====
Team	City/Area
Ottawa Tigers	Ottawa
Toronto Valkyrie	Toronto
Waterloo Wyverns	Waterloo

== Champions ==
=== Men's Championship ===
Season	Champions
2010	Toronto City Saints
2011	Niagara Bobcats
2012	Scarborough Centurions
2013	Scarborough Centurions
2014	Scarborough Centurions
2015	Scarborough Centurions
2016	Scarborough Centurions
2017	Scarborough Centurions
2018	Brantford Broncos
2019	Toronto City Saints
2020	COVID-19 disruption
2021	COVID-19 disruption
2022	Brantford Broncos
2023	Brantford Broncos
2024	Tavistock Trash Pandas
2025	Tavistock Trash Pandas
2026	Tavistock Trash Pandas

==== Women's Championship ====
Season	Champions
2025	Waterloo Wyverns
2026	Waterloo Wyverns

== See also ==
- Alberta Rugby League
- British Columbia Rugby League
- Rugby league in Canada
- Toronto Wolfpack
- Ottawa Aces
