= Pemberton Secondary School =

Location
- 1400 Oak St. Pemberton, British Columbia, V0N 2L0; Canada; 50.3237°N 122.8010°W

Information
- School type: Public, high school
- Founded: 1995
- School board: School District 48 Sea to Sky
- Superintendent: Dr. Lisa McCullough
- Area trustee: Pat MacKenzie and Rebecca Barley
- School number: 4848021
- Administrator: Brenda McLeod, Michelle Garrett-Jones
- Principal: Brianne Aldcroft
- Staff: 26
- Grades: 8-12
- Enrollment: 307 (2013)
- Language: English, French
- Area: Pemberton
- Colours: Red, Black and White
- Mascot: The Red Devil
- Team name: Red Devils
- Website: sd48pemberton.org

Pemberton Secondary School is a public high school in Pemberton, British Columbia, part of School District 48 Sea to Sky. In addition to standard academic and athletic courses, it offers French Immersion, Aboriginal Education, and International Education programs.

The school building has a capacity of approximately 300 but accommodated more than 350 students. The current school opened in September 1995.

== Notable alumni ==
- Rob Boyd: Member of the Canadian National Alpine Ski Team from 1985 to 1997.
- Allison Forsyth: Member of the Canadian National Alpine Ski Team from 1995 to 2008 also competed in the 2002, 2006, 2008 Winter Olympics.
- Britt Janyk: Member of the Canadian National Alpine Ski Team from 1996 to 2011. Also competed in the 2010 Winter Olympics.
- Mike Janyk: Member of the Canadian National Alpine Ski Team from 2000 to 2014. Also competed in the 2006, 2008 and 2010 Winter Olympics.
- Willy Raine: Member of the Canadian Alpine Ski Team who competed in the 1992 Winter Olympics. Current Technical Coach at Canada Ski Cross.
