= Brazil women's national rugby league team =

National rugby league team representing Brazil

Brazil
Team information
- Governing body: Confederação Brasileira de Rugby League
- Region: Americas
- Head coach: Paul Grundy
- Captain: Maria Graf
- IRL ranking: 21 ▲2 (20 August 2026)

Team results
- First international
- Brazil 48–0 Argentina (26 November 2018)
- Biggest win
- Brazil 48–0 Argentina (26 November 2018)
- Biggest defeat
- Brazil 0–70 Papua New Guinea (5 November 2022)
- World Cup
- Appearances: 1 (first time in 2021)
- Best result: 2021 Group Stage

The Brazil women's national rugby league team represent Brazil in international rugby league football competitions. They were announced to play in the 2021 Women's Rugby League World Cup in July 2019. Former Super League player Matt Gardner, of Brazilian descent, was announced as head coach in November 2019. However, due to Covid restrictions and personal circumstance, Gardner was unable to fulfil his duties as head coach and was replaced by Paul Grundy in November 2020.

== Current squad ==
The following squad was announced on 10 October 2022 for the postponed 2021 Women's Rugby League World Cup in November 2022.
Table last updated 10 November 2022, following the Round 3 match against Canada.

J#	Player	Club	Debut	M	T	G	Pts
8	Franciny Amaral	Melina	2022	3	1	0	4
15	Franciele Barros	Melina	2022	3	0	0	0
14	Giovanna Barth	Maringa Hawks	2022	2	0	0	0
9	Patricia Bodeman	Melina	2022	3	1	0	4
10	Paula Casemiro	Vitoria Rhinos	2022	3	0	0	0
1	Adriana Felix	Vitoria Rhinos	2022	2	0	0	0
2	Tatiane Fernandes	Vitoria Rhinos	2018	3	0	0	0
7	Maria Graf	Urutau	2018	3	0	2	4
23	Natalia Jonck	Melina	2022	1	0	0	0
13	Bárbara Leal	Vitoria Rhinos	2022	2	0	0	0
17	Ana Loschi de Quadros	Vitoria Rhinos	2022	3	0	0	0
3	Leticia Medeiros	Melina	2022	3	0	0	0
18	Natalia Momberg	Vitoria Rhinos	2022	3	1	0	4
6	Giovanna Moura	Maringa Hawks	2022	3	0	0	0
11	Patricia Oliveira	Melina	2022	3	0	0	0
16	Brena Prioste	Urutau	2022	3	0	0	0
6	Suzana Rodrigues	Vitoria Rhinos	—	0	0	0	0
5	Byanca Santa Rita	Melina	2022	1	0	0	0
22	Edna Santini	Vitoria Rhinos	2022	3	1	0	4
20	Pāmella Nascimento Silva	Melina	2022	1	0	0	0
4	Daniele Soares	Maringa Hawks	2022	1	0	0	0
21	Ellen Trindade	Melina	2022	1	0	0	0
12	Amanda Welter	Maringa Hawks	2022	3	0	0	0

Notes:

- Just two members of the World Cup squad had played against Argentina in 2018. They are Maria Graf and Tatiane (Tati) Fernandes.
- All members of the squad participated in a warm-up match against France on 27 October 2022, with Franciny Amaral scoring the Brazil's only try.

== Results ==
=== Full Internationals ===
Date	Opponent	Score	Tournament	Venue	Video	Report(s)
26 Oct 2018	Argentina	48–0	2018 South American Cup	Clube de Campo do Palmeiras, São Paulo	—	—
1 Nov 2022	England	4–72	2021 World Cup	Headingley Stadium, Leeds		
5 Nov 2022	Papua New Guinea	0–70	2021 World Cup	MKM Stadium, Hull		
9 Nov 2022	Canada	16–22	2021 World Cup	Headingley Stadium, Leeds		

=== Unofficial Matches ===
Date	Opponent	Score	Tournament	Venue	Video	Report(s)
27 Oct 2022	France	4–16	2021 World Cup Warm-Up Match	Post Office Road, Featherstone		

Note:

- The above match against France is not considered a full international as more than 17 players took the field.

== Records ==
=== Margins and streaks ===
Biggest winning margins

Margin	Score	Opponent	Venue	Date
48	48–0	Argentina	Clube de Campo do Palmeiras, São Paulo	25 Nov 2018

Biggest losing margins

Margin	Score	Opponent	Venue	Date
70	0–70	Papua New Guinea	Headingley Stadium	5 Nov 2022
68	4–72	England	Headingley Stadium	1 Nov 2022
12	4–16	France France	Millennium	27 Oct 2022
