= 2018 South American Rugby League Cup =

2018 South American Rugby League Championship
- Number of teams: 3
- Host country: Brazil
- Winner: Brazil (1st title)
- Matches played: 3

The 2018 South American Rugby League Championship was held in São Paulo, Brazil from November 23 to 25, 2018. It was the inaugural edition of the tournament featuring three teams: Brazil, Argentina and Colombia. The South American Cup also features a diverse range of matches, including women's international clash between Brazil and Argentina, a second-division showdown between the two nations, and an Under-17's encounter between Brazil and Argentina.

== Fixtures ==
=== South American Cup – Men's ===
23 November 2018
15:00 BST (UTC-2)

Brazil	52 – 14	Colombia
	Report

São Paulo, Brazil

24 November 2018
14:00 BST (UTC-2)

Colombia	16 – 28	Argentina
	Report

São Paulo, Brazil

25 November 2018
16:00 BST (UTC-2)

Brazil	22 – 20	Argentina
	Report

São Paulo, Brazil

=== South American Silver Cup – Men's ===
25 November 2018
11:00 BST (UTC-2)

Brazil B	38 – 0	Argentina B
	Report

São Paulo, Brazil

=== South American Cup – Women's ===
25 November 2018
13:30 BST (UTC-2)

Brazil	48 – 0	Argentina
Tries: 10; Carolina Palazzini 3 Aline Bednarski 2 Jenifer Pacheco 2 Paula Ishibashi; Danielle Missau; Camila Lacerda; Goals: 4 Schwarleny Schwambach 4	Report	Tries: nil Goals: nil

São Paulo, Brazil

=== Under-17's International ===
25 November 2018
08:30 BST (UTC-2)

Brazil U17	32 – 4	Argentina U17
	Report

São Paulo, Brazil

Fixture Source:

== Teams ==
=== Brazil ===
Brazil Men's Squad:

Liniker Farias (São Lourenço), Rogério Simões (Bandeirantes Devils), Warlen Junior (Jacareí), Lucas Drudi (Jacareí), Douglas Parazi (Piratas), Vinícius Hideo (SPAC), Lucas Virias (Paraná), Leandro Caetano (Bandeirantes Devils) Jorge Cabral (Oxford), Gudemberg Silva (Bandeirantes Devils), Gabriel Eduardo (Paraná), Bruno Gil (Bandeirantes Devils), Zachary Grundy (Nambour Crushers); Interchange: Matheus Marinho (Bandeirantes Devils), Danilo Vieira (Templários), Johnny Santos (Portuguesa Futebol Americano), Branco Meneses (Portuguesa Futebol Americano). Rafael Góes (Jacareí), Caio Ozzioli (Bandeirantes Devils), Denes Cardozo (Piratas), Arthur Isaac (São Lourenço)

Brazil Men's B Squad:

Marcos Matioli (Rio de Janeiro), Leandro Pereira (C) (Tatuape), Djalma Dias (Tatuape), Diego Gonsalves (Piratas), Carlos Silva (Sao Lourenco) 6 Liam Piacente (Bandeirantes Devils), Victor Gerheim (Rio de Janeiro), Alexandre Arantes, (Sao Lourenco), Joao Victor, (Sao Lourenco), Diller (Rio de Janeiro Rugby League XIII), Fred Costa, (BH Rugby), Claudio Martins (Rio de Janeiro), Sergio Junior (Rio de Janeiro); Interchange: Joao Paulo da Silva (Rio de Janeiro), Thiago Navarro (Tatuape), Daniel Brito (Rio de Janeiro), Lucas Pires (Athens Itanhaem), Diller Nogueira (Templarios), Samuel Naassom do Nascimento (Bandeirantes Devils), Fernando Mazon (Parana)

Brazil Women's Squad:

Carolina Palazzini (C) (Bandeirantes Devils), Camila Santos (SPAC), Juliana Modaneze (Bandeirantes Devils), Paula Ishibashi (SPAC), Grasiele Santos (Bandeirantes Devils), Aline Mayumi (SPAC), Danielle Missau (Pasteur Athletique Club), Andressa Conreras (Niteroi), Camila Giaj-Levra (Bandeirantes Devils), Brunta Lotufu (Bandeirantes Devils), Schwarleny Schwambach (Bandeirantes Devils), Kathleen Silva (Sao Lourenco); Interchange: Ketlen Oliveira (Sao Lourenco), Maria Graf (Desterro), Karina Araujo (Vitoria), Ana Claudia (Rio de Janeiro), Edna Santini (Sao Jose), Tatiane Fernandes (Lenks), Amanda Snaga (USP)

=== Colombia ===
Colombia Men's Squad:

1. Nicolas Medina 2. Daniel Vera Girdalo 3. Duvan Barrera 4. Hector Linares 5. Andres Pena 6. Alex Palomeque 7. Juan Camilo Bermudez 8. Steven Bedoya 9. Johan Bastioas 10. Mautricio Patino 11. Diego Vina 12. Sebastian Hernandez 13. Alejandro Munevar 14. Luigui Vanegas 15. Juan David Espinal 16. Alex Estman 17. Luis David Valencia

=== Argentina ===
Argentina Men's Squad:

Juan Ignacio Canepa, Marcelo Villalba, Emiliano Rodriguez, Ares Martinez, Ariel Cosso, Facundo Lizarzuay, Lucas Escobar, Gaston Barrera, Dario Moyano, Ulises Silva, Nahuel Lajmanovich, Leandro Donato, Sergio Espinola; Interchange: Dylan Moreira, Juan Carlos Blumetti, Ernesto Di Nucci, Leandro Kwiczor, Brian Avejera
