= Canada Rugby League =

Governing body for rugby league in Canada

- Founded: 17 July 2010
- Americas affiliation: 2011 (observer); 2013 (affiliate)
- Responsibility: Canada
- Competitions: Alberta Rugby League Competition; British Columbia Rugby League; Ontario Rugby League Competition
- Website: canadarugbyleague.com http://www.bcrl.ca

Canada Rugby League (CRL) (French: Rugby à XIII du Canada) is the governing body for the sport of rugby league football in Canada. Founded in 2010, the CRL organizes the Canada national rugby league team and supports the development of the game through the country's domestic competitions.

== History ==
Canada Rugby League was formed in February 2010 "with a vision to bring rugby league to the people of Canada". The organisation was founded to redevelop organised rugby league in Canada, which had been dormant since the Canadian Rugby League Federation folded in 2000. The CRL reestablished the Canada national rugby league team to participate in international competition and set up a domestic league from which national team players would be drawn. The team played its first competitive game in ten years at the 2010 "War at the Shore" tournament, hosted by the American National Rugby League (AMNRL) in New Jersey. In September 2010 CRL hosted its first international game in Canada, with Canada facing the United States in the Colonial Cup. Later that year they competed in the Rugby League Atlantic Cup in Jacksonville, Florida. Canada won its first international match since 2000 on 31 July 2011 defeating Jamaica 40-10 in Markham, Ontario.

In 2017, Toronto Wolfpack to begin play in the third tier of the British rugby league system. They achieved promotion to the second tier in their first attempt. In May 2019, it was announced Canada would get a second team, Ottawa Aces to begin play in the third tier from 2021. On 22 October 2021, it was announced that Ottawa Aces would relocate back to the United Kingdom permanently due the "unstable operating environment" of running a club in the British leagues from Canada during a pandemic.

== Logo ==
The Canada Rugby League logo, used since 2010, incorporates symbols and imagery of Canada and rugby league football. The CRL designed the logo to be "unique compared to other Canadian sports logos, yet instantly recognisable to the League community". The CRL gives this description of the logo: "Blended with the core rugby league imagery of the ball and twin vee, the CRL logo has been designed to incorporate some very Canadian imagery including an outline of the entire country, and naturally the maple leaf. The colours of red, black and white are also synonymous with the country, and will be prominent on the Canadian national team." In 2015, after a whole new board was put in place, the logo was updated for the 2017 World Cup Qualifiers against Jamaica and the USA, with new sponsors IMPACT Prowear providing the kit. IMPACT Prowear then designed an entire off field range, which was released in collaboration with the CRL for these qualifiers.

An entirely new logo was introduced in February 2021 still based on the maple leaf but incorporating the chevrons from the national kit and giving the name in both French and English.

== Domestic competitions ==
The CRL has also been developing a Canada-based domestic league. In July 2010, St. Catharines Bobcats, based in St. Catharines in Ontario's Niagara Region, were announced as the league's first domestic team. In September 2010 the Bobcats were joined by a second team, the Toronto City Saints. The Saints formed a relationship with the St Helens R.F.C. of the Super League. The Bobcats and Saints played two games against each other, with players for the national squad being drawn from the two teams. Toronto won both games.

In 2011, the CRL announced the domestic competition would expand to four teams in Ontario. St. Catharines Bobcats changed their name to the Niagara Bobcats, while two new clubs from the Toronto area were announced. The two new clubs are the York Region Reds, based in Ontario's York Region, and the Scarborough Centurions, based in Toronto's Scarborough area. York Region has a team partnership with Salford of the Super League, while Scarborough has a partnership with Leigh, who play in the Co-operative Championship.

In 2012, British Columbia commenced a new domestic competition which had 5 teams under the British Columbia Rugby League Competition (BCRL) banner. By the end of 2012, BC had become the premier competition within Canada. In 2013, BCRL expanded to 6 teams namely Bayside Sharks, Kelowna Crows, Richmond Bears, Sea to Sky Eagles, Surrey Beavers and Vancouver Dragons.

== See also ==
- Rugby league in Canada
- Toronto Wolfpack
- Ottawa Aces
- North American Rugby League
- Canada national rugby league team
