= Rugby league in Canada =

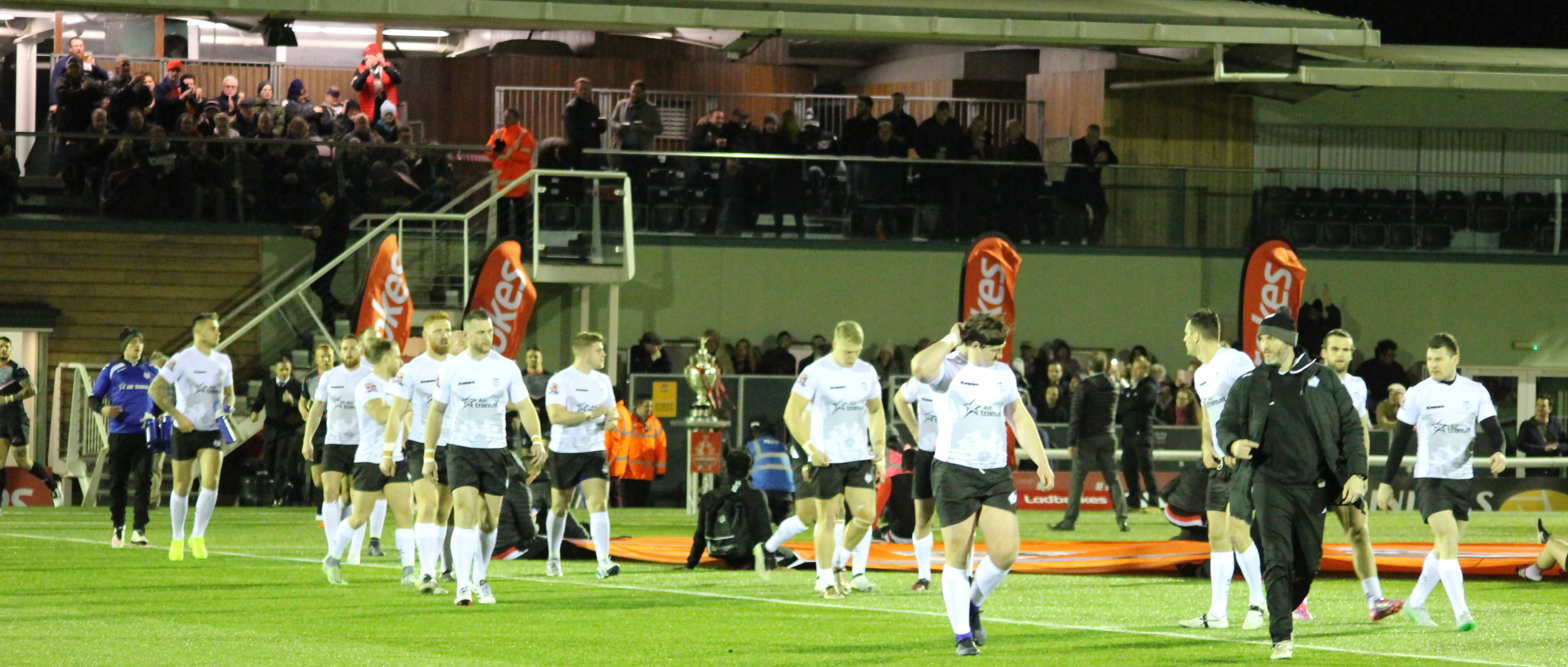
- The Toronto Wolfpack take the field against the London Broncos during the Challenge Cup
- Country: Canada
- Governing body: Canada Rugby League
- National team(s): Men's national team; Women's national team
- First played: 1928

National competitions
- Rugby League World Cup

Rugby league football (French: Rugby à XIII) is a participation and spectator sport in Canada.

== History ==
Games related to rugby football have been played in Canada since the 19th century, with the first Rugby Union being established in 1861. However, the rugby league made little headway in the country, where rugby union and later Canadian football were the dominant field sports. In 1928 the Great Britain Lions, Britain's national rugby league team, visited Canada on their way home from a tour of Australia and New Zealand. According to the Imperial Rugby League Board, a domestic competition using rugby league rules was held in Canada the following year.

From the late 19th century Canadian unions adopted rule changes, generally similar to changes made in the United States, which created the sport known as Canadian football. Through the 20th century football gained in popularity, displacing other codes. With support declining, the Nova Scotia Rugby Union, which governed the sport in Nova Scotia and the Maritimes, decided to adopt the rugby league code in hopes of saving rugby from the incursion of Canadian football. The switch was first discussed in 1945, but the lack of a rule book precluded any action. The switch was finally agreed upon in 1946, and the switch was made the following season.

With the exception of Halifax schools, which had adopted football, all competitions in the Maritimes, – the senior level, Maritime, high school, and university competitions – made the switch to rugby league. Unlike most rugby league competitions, the NSRU continued to be recognized by the Canadian Rugby Football Union, and all players remained amateur. Though attendance and participation increased in the first year, it did not last, and football continued to increase in popularity throughout the Maritimes. The universities all switched to football by 1955, and the senior league shrank to just four teams. Rugby league continued to be played in many Nova Scotia high schools until 1959, and was still played elsewhere in the Maritimes into the 1960s, but disappeared thereafter.

=== Revival ===
In the 1980s interest in amateur rugby league returned, and in 1986 a new competition, the Tri-Counties Rugby League, was established. Four teams competed in its first year, three from Canada, and one from the U.S., the New York-based Adirondacks club. Later, the Canada national rugby league team was formed, and participated semi-regularly in international competition from 1987–2000. The team competed in the 2000 Emerging Nations Tournament, but afterward went dormant as the governing body folded. Thereafter Canada's rugby league participation dwindled, though there were two regional rugby league nines tournaments as recently as 2003, one in Ontario and one in Manitoba.

In 2010, a new organization, Canada Rugby League, was formed with the intention of reviving the national team and building a new domestic competition. Under the CRL the national team played international games several times in 2010, including the American National Rugby League's annual "War at the Shore" event, hosting the Colonial Cup, and competing in the Rugby League Atlantic Cup in Jacksonville, Florida. Two domestic teams, the Toronto City Saints and the St. Catharines Bobcats, were established, and are set to be joined by two new teams in 2011. Super League teams St Helens R.F.C. and Salford City Reds have also formed partnerships with Canadian rugby league, and Rugby League Review, one of the leading rugby league magazines around the world came on board as a sponsor of Canadian rugby league. Setanta Sports will broadcast rugby league matches in Canada. Canada won its first international match of the revival era on July 31, 2011 defeating Jamaica 40-10 in Markham, Ontario.

In 2016, the 2025 Rugby League World Cup was jointly awarded to Canada and the United States, however both later withdrew.

In 2017, Toronto Wolfpack was formed as an expansion club of the British rugby league system, and competed for four seasons until the COVID-19 pandemic, entering the league system in League 1 and seeing two promotions in three years to finish in the Super League.

Post-covid, the Wolfpack formed their own competition within North America after the failed North American Rugby League.

== Club competition ==
There are currently three (known) provisional competitions in Canada, the Ontario Rugby League Competition, the British Columbia Rugby League Competition, and the Alberta Rugby League Competition, all are amateur.

Canada attempted to launch the professional North American Rugby League along with the USA in 2021, however this never materialised. In 2023, Toronto Wolfpack, Canada's only professional club (who previously had completed in the British rugby league system) organised the Canada Cup, an international league for all of North America.

== See also ==
- Canada national rugby league team
- Canada women's national rugby league team
- North American Rugby League
