= Rugby league in Catalonia =

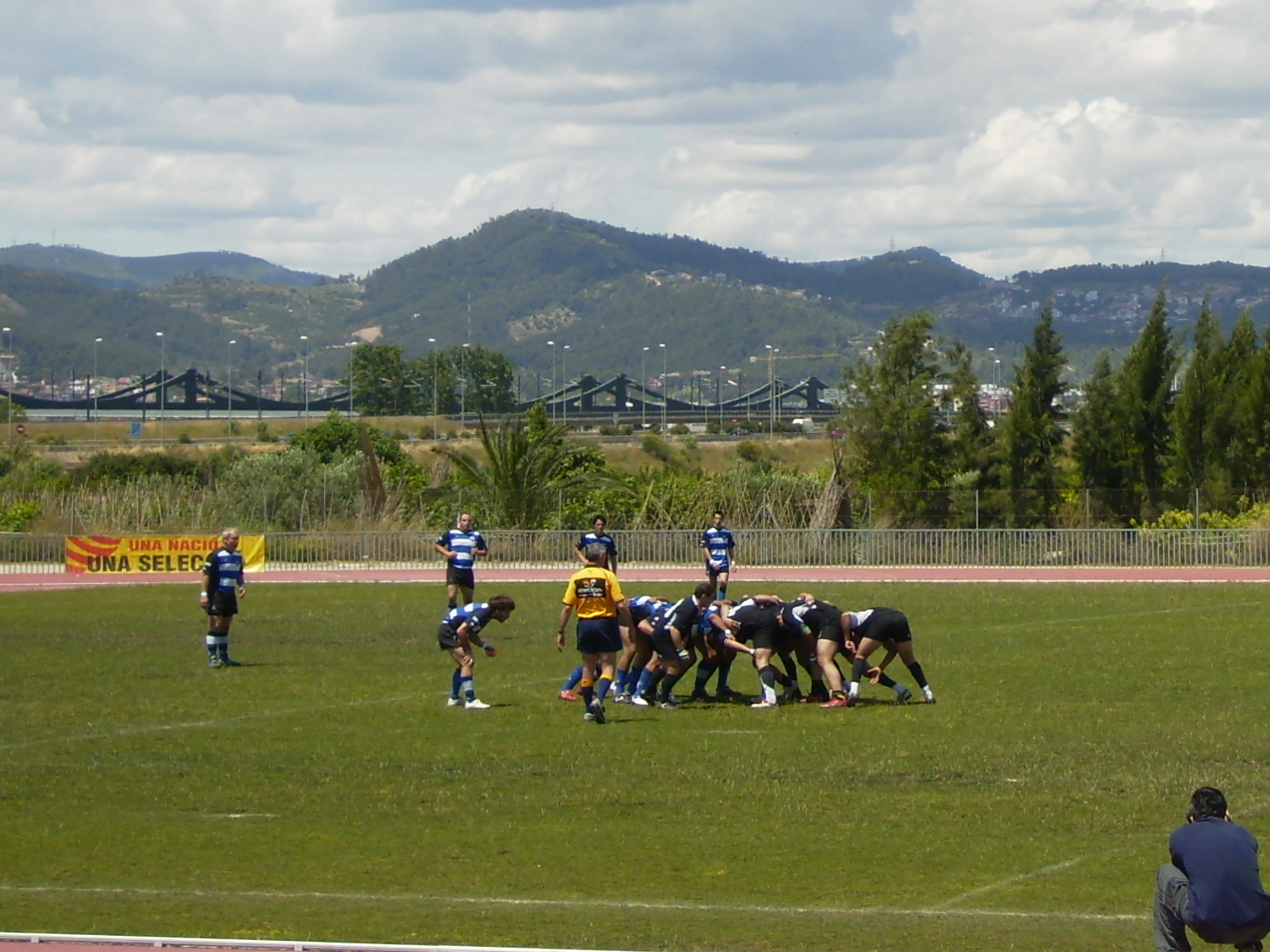
- Final of the 2009 Catalonia Championship, won by Barcelona Universitari Club 38–26 over Sant Cugat
- Governing body: Associació Catalana de Rugby Lliga
- Representative team: Men's
- Nickname(s): Rugby Lliga (in Catalan)

National competitions
- Catalan Rugby League Championship

Rugby League in Catalonia was formalised in 2007 with the formation of Associació Catalana de Rugby Lliga who ran rugby league activities until 2010.

Since then, the Spanish Rugby League Association formed in 2013 who govern the sport in all of Spain.

== History ==
Rugby league in Catalonia came from France with several attempts by French Catalan clubs to expand interest of the sport to Spanish Catalonia.

The first of these attempts occurred on 30 May 1993, when Perpignan-based XIII Catalan invited Huddersfield Giants to contested a friendly named "The Alex Angel Trophy" at the Estadi Olímpic Lluís Companys in Barcelona, with Huddersfield won 23–22.

The first governing body of rugby league in Spain was formed in Catalonia in 2007 solely for Catalonia. The Associació Catalana de Rugby Lliga was responsible for Catalan Rugby League Championship and the Catalonia national rugby league team and was granted observer status of the Rugby League European Federation (RLEF) in 2008. The body however was expelled from the RLEF in 2014 due to lack of activity since 2010.

During this time Catalans Dragons, a French club playing in the British league formed from the merging of the aforementioned XIII Catalan and AS Saint-Estève, played a regular season game on 20 June 2009, at Barcelona's Estadi Olímpic Lluís Companys against Warrington. Catalans led the match at halftime 10–6, but Warrington finished as the winners beating the Dragons 24–12.

In 2019 Catalan Dragons set a world record for the highest attended non-magic regular season Super League match attendance, electing to hold their home game against Wigan Warriors at the Camp Nou, attracting a crowd of 31,555.

== Governing body ==
The governing body for rugby league in Catalonia was the Associació Catalana de Rugby Lliga, being an unranked member of the Rugby League European Federation with Official observer status since 2008.

In September 2014, Observer status of the RLEF was revoked as the association had not reported any activity since 2009.

== Competitions ==
The first Catalan competition, the Catalonia Cup, took place in April 2008 with 3 teams: FC Barcelona, Aligots de Girona and Nord-Català. The winners were FC Barcelona. The results from the competition were:

- FC Barcelona 22-20 Aligots Girona
- Aligots Girona 24-0 Nord-Català
- Nord-Català 4-24 FC Barcelona

In February 2009 the first Catalan university rugby league championship took place, with seven universities teams participating: Perpinyà, Ramon Llull, Girona, Autònoma de Barcelona, Vic, Politècnica de Catalunya and Pompeu Fabra. Universitat de Perpinyà were the winners.

In Spring 2009 was played the first Catalan Rugby League Championship, with nine teams in competition: Barcelona Universitari Club, Club de Rugby Sant Cugat, CE INEF Lleida, GEIEG, Club Natació Poble Nou - Enginyers, Club de Rugby Tarragona, Garrotxa Rugbi Club, Club Atlètic Vic - Crancs and Club Rugby Valls. Barcelona Universitari Club were the champions.

== National team ==
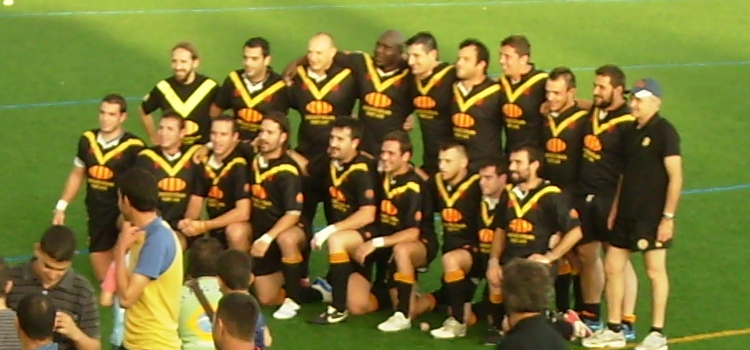
Catalonia national rugby league team in 2009

The Catalonia national rugby league team played their first full international losing to Morocco in a game played prior to the Catalans Dragons vs Warrington Wolves Super League, on June 21, 2008.

In June 2009, Catalonia beat the Czech Republic in a match played prior to the Catalans Dragons vs Warrington Wolves Super League game, this time played in Barcelona. This match was an international warm-up ahead of the Euro Med Challenge contested by Catalonia, Morocco and Belgium. They lost 6-29 at home to Morocco and 28-22 at Belgium.

== French Catalonia ==
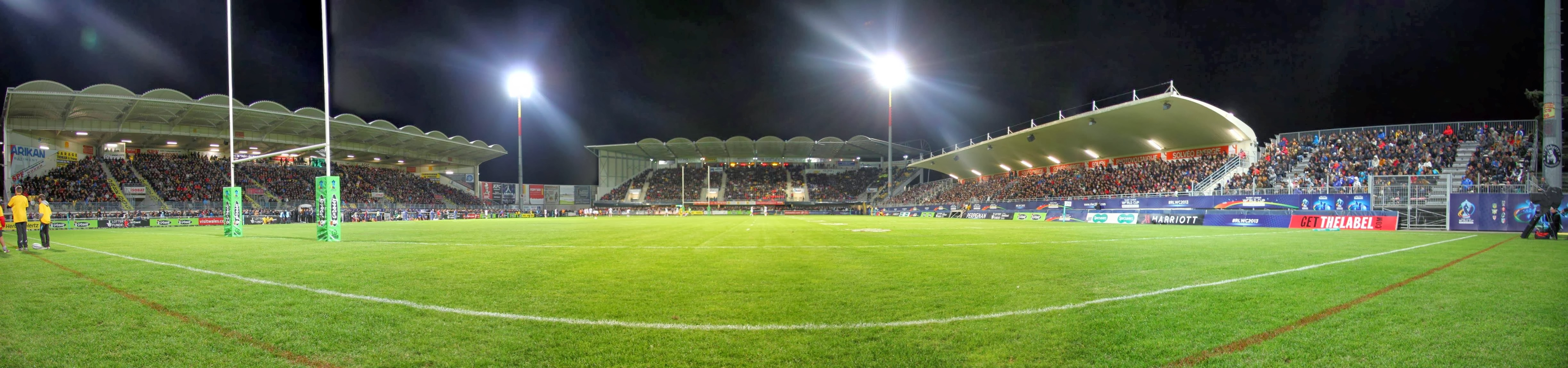
French Catalan stadium Stade Gilbert Brutus hosting a match of the 2013 Rugby League World Cup, the only Catalan stadium to host a world cup game

French Catalonia highlighted on a map of France

As it is in France, French Catalan rugby league is entirely governed by the French Rugby League Federation, and has been since the federation's creation in 1934. The Pyrénées-Orientales, the official department name of the region, is the heart of rugby league in France. The region is most famous in modern time for Catalan Dragons who compete in the British rugby league system (considered to be a higher tier competition that the French leagues), but also is home to a number of successful French clubs who between them (as of 2024) have won 23 out of 83 French championships and 24 out of 80 Lord Derby Cups.

== See also ==
- Sport in Catalonia
- Sport in Spain
- Rugby league in Spain
