= Rugby league in Norway =

Rugby league is a growing team sport in Norway. The sport is administered there by Rugby League Norge, which was set up in late 2008. Rugby League Norge works according to RLEF and NIF laws.

== History ==
In February 2008, the Rugby League European Federation (RLEF) granted Norway official observer status, and in 2008 a committee was formed, based in Oslo, with the aim of developing the game all over the country.

The first rugby league event to take place on Norwegian soil was the Scandinavia Cup nine-a-side tournament in Oslo. Then a national team was selected to play against the British and Irish Student Pioneers. Norway lost this match 24–0. Later in the year, Norway played their first full international match, against Denmark in Copenhagen. Norway won the match 28–26.

In 2010 the first league season started in June, with a Grand Final won by Oslo RK, who defeated Lillestrøm Lions. Meanwhile, the Norwegian national team competed in their first official tournament, the 2010 European Bowl competition against Malta.

In 2011 it was hoped to see the domestic competition expand to five teams: Aker Seagulls (Oslo), Flisbyen Broncos (formerly Lillestrøm Lions), Fredrikstad Falcons, Oslo Capitals, and Tromsø Polar Bears. The 2011 Norwegian Grand Final was scheduled for September 10.

On 26 October 2011, Rugby League Norge was granted Affiliate status within the RLEF.

Norway competed in the Nordic Cup from its inception in 2011 until 2017, the last time the tournament was held

In 2018, Norway defeated Germany 40-22 and progressed to the second last stage of the World Cup qualifying campaign. The following year, they faced Greece, losing by 56-22.

In 2023, Norway is due to play two friendlies. They faced The Netherlands in September, who proved to be too strong, winning 58-22 over the Vikings. On November 4, Norway lost to Greece in Sandnes, 36-6.

In may 2024 Norway travelled to Athens to play against Greece. Norway lost 34-26.

== Domestic competition ==
Norway runs a senior men's competition with five teams participating in the national 13-a-side championship:

There has been 6 different teams that have won the national 13's competition since 2009. The 2020 season was not held because of the Covid-19 pandemic.

Lillestrøm Lions Rugby League Klubb is a historic winning club. They have won the national competition 4 times in a row.

== Local competitions ==
In 2024 there is 3 local competitions held.

Lister League: A 7's tournament held in Farsund.

Alt-Heis Cup: A 9's Tournament held in Haugesund.

Rogalandscup: A XIII tournament held in Rogaland.

== Clubs ==
Former clubs that have competed in the National competition

- Porsgrunn Pirates (1x National champions. The 1 joint with Stavanger Storm due to Covid19)
- Tromsø Polar Bears (1x National champions)
- Bodø Barbarians (1x National champions)
- Haugesund Sea Eagles
- Trondheim Rugbyklubb (1x National champions with Lillestrøm Lions (Flisbyen Broncos)
- Indre Vestland
- Oslo Capitols (4x National champions)
- Stavanger storm (4x National champions. 1 of those joint with Porsgrunn due to Covid19)
- Aker Seagulls

The following teams play in the 2026 competition.

- Lillestrøm Lions
- Farsund Bobcats
- Sandnes Raiders
- Midgard Marauders

== Domestic competition champions ==
- 2010 Oslo Capitals
- 2011 Tromsø Polar Bears
- 2012 Oslo Capitals
- 2013 Oslo Capitals
- 2014 Oslo Capitals
- 2015 Bodø Barbarians
- 2016 Trondheim Rugbyklubb/Flisbyen Broncos
- 2017 Stavanger Storm
- 2018 Stavanger Storm
- 2019 Joint winners Stavanger Storm / Porsgrunn Pirates
- 2021 Stavanger Storm
- 2022 Lillestrøm Lions
- 2023 Lillestrøm Lions
- 2024 Lillestrøm Lions
- 2025 Lillestrøm Lions

== Media ==
In February 2011, Rugby League Norway announced a deal with TV 2 Sport for one game of the Engage Super League to be screened each week. In addition, a weekly timeslot was allocated to promote the fledgling domestic competition. The first Super League match ever screened live in Norway was the clash between St. Helens and Wigan Warriors. That match was played on at the Millennium Stadium in Cardiff as part of Millennium Magic.

In 2012, the Norwegian Grand Final was broadcast live on the Internet through NRK (Norsk Riks Kringkasting). This was a huge step towards showing people the game in Norway.

== National team ==
Norway's national team is nicknamed "Vikingene". They first competed in 2009.
