= Rugby League European Championship C =

International rugby championship

European Championship C
- Current season, competition or edition: 2026 Rugby League European Championships
- Sport: Rugby league
- Founded: 2008; 18 years ago
- Organising body: European Rugby League
- No. of teams: 3
- Country: Europe
- Most recent champion: Ukraine (4th title)
- Most titles: Ukraine (4 titles)
- Level on pyramid: 3
- Promotion to: European Championship B
- Relegation to: European Championship D

The Rugby League European Championship C (formerly the European Bowl) is an international European rugby league football tournament organised by the European Rugby League for third tier rugby league nations.

== History ==
The tournament was first contested in 2008, with the proposed participating teams being Estonia, Latvia and Ukraine. Latvia defeated Estonia to win the inaugural competition, and Ukraine, who had been unable to compete in 2008, won the competition the following year. In 2010, with Latvia and Ukraine moving up to the European Shield, three new teams were to compete for the Bowl: Belgium, Malta and Norway. However, Belgium withdrew leaving Malta to defeat Norway for the title. It remained a two-team event in 2011 and 2012 with the Czech Republic defeating Hungary in both years.

The next three tournaments saw the return of a three-team format with differing combinations of teams each year. It was won by Ukraine in 2013, Greece in 2014 and Spain in 2015. The 2015 competition, which also included a pre-qualifying match, served as part of the qualifying process for the 2017 World Cup. The 2018–19 competition, which also counted towards 2021 World Cup qualification, saw the expansion to six teams divided into two groups. The group stage was played in between June and September 2018, and the final, in which Greece defeated Norway, was played in May 2019.

In 2020, it was announced promotion and relegation would be introduced with three teams in each division, with the top team being promoted and the bottom relegated.

The competition was intended to be scrapped in 2023 due to expansion of Euro A and Euro B, however this never materialised.

In March 2025, the European Rugby League (ERL) announced the return of the tournament for Euro B, C, and D, with the competition returning to a three team per division competition. Competing nations were reseeded based on Rank, with the 2025 and 2026 tournaments confirmed. The ERL stated its aim to restart Euro A in 2027 following the 2026 Men's Rugby League World Cup, with the top European teams unable to join earlier due to commitments in the qualification tournament for the World Cup.

== Results ==
Year	Champions	Runners-up	Third place	Number of teams
2008; Details	Latvia	Estonia	–	2
2009; Details	Ukraine	Latvia	Estonia	3
2010; Details	Malta	Norway	–	2
2011; Details	Czech Republic	Hungary	–	2
2012; Details	Czech Republic	Hungary	–	2
2013; Details	Ukraine	Norway	Czech Republic	3
2014; Details	Greece	Malta	Czech Republic	3
2015; Details	Spain	Malta	Greece	3
2016; Details	Ukraine	Czech Republic	–	2
2018–19; Details	Greece	Norway	Germany and Ukraine	6
2025; Details	Ukraine	Greece	Italy	3

== Summary ==
Champions	Count	Years
Ukraine	3	2009, 2013, 2016, 2025
Czech Republic	2	2011, 2012
Greece	2	2014, 2018–19
Latvia	1	2008
Malta	1	2010
Spain	1	2015

== See also ==
- Rugby League European Championship A
- Rugby League European Championship B
- Rugby League European Championship D
- Women's Rugby League European Championship
- Wheelchair Rugby League European Championship
