= Belgium Rugby League Association =

Sports governing body in Belgium

Belgian Rugby League Association
- Founded: 2009
- RLEF affiliation: (Official observer)
- Responsibility: Belgium
- Headquarters: Brussels, Belgium
- Competitions: Belgian Super League

(Belgium)

The Belgian Rugby League Association is the governing body for rugby league in Belgium. It was formed in early 2009 as Belgium Rugby League and given Observer status by the RLIF. The first Belgian club was established in Wavre and on 11 July 2009 they faced Hammersmith Hills Hoists in the first match to be played in Belgium. Two weeks later, the Belgium XIII representative side defeated a Catalonia XIII in the Euro Med Challenge. In 2010, Belgium were scheduled to compete in the European Bowl, but withdrew from the tournament and development of the sport in Belgium was suspended.

In May 2013, the governing body was re-established as the Belgian Rugby League Association and joined the RLEF later that month as Observers. On 29 June, in a match against the Netherlands, Belgium fielded their first national team conforming to international regulations. In 2015, Belgian and Dutch clubs took part in a joint competition, the BNRL Championship, and the association announced plans for the first Belgian Super League to commence in November 2015. However, in 2019 it was reported that a national club competition had yet to be developed.

In March 2024, Belgium were expelled from the IRL due to inactivity.
