= Rugby league in Germany =

- Sport: Rugby league
- Founded: 2004
- CEO: Bob Doughton (President)
- No. of teams: 6
- Most recent champion: none

Rugby league is a minor sport in Germany. The national governing body for the sport, Rugby League Deutschland, is an associate member of the Rugby League European Federation. The country's national team are regular competitors in the European Shield, winning the competition in 2006 and 2011.

== History ==
Rugby league was introduced into Germany in August 2004 with the formation of Rugby League Deutschland by Simon Cooper who was born in Halifax, England whose father is German. Prior to that it had been played informally by expat players associations such as British servicemen and students.

The first ever game didn't take place until nearly 12 months later when on 23 July the Heidelberg Sharks beat München RLFC 72-64 in a 9-a-side game played in Heidelberg. Since then clubs Bad Reichenhall and Innsbruck have also played matches.

In 2005 there was the first match between a Germany XIII and a touring Scottish Students side. This was a catalyst for Germany entering in 2006 in their first full international tournament the Central Europe Development Tri-Nations and then subsequently in the European Shield in 2007 and 2008. In 2011, Rugby League Deutschland was admitted to affiliate membership of the Rugby League European Federation after reforms to its governance.

== Popularity ==
The popularity of rugby league in Germany is small, and rugby of any form is still very much unknown by Germans. 80 adult players and around 200 children were introduced to the game in 2008.

=== Bundesland of Origin ===
In 2007 a State (Bundesland) of Origin style concept has also been introduced with two regional teams representing Bavaria and Central Germany. The weekend of this game is also used to bring everyone together for a training session and for the Coach and selectors to see all players in one place and also to have a meeting. The first such game was played in 2007 in Nürnberg.

- 15 December - Bavaria 44-32 Central Germany - Nürnberg, Germany

== National team ==
The Germany national rugby league team made its début at the 2006 Central Europe Development Tri-Nations tournament which it won with victories over Austria and Estonia. This was followed by second place finishes in the European Shield in 2007, 2008 and 2010 (West), before winning the competition in 2011. In 2013, Germany played their first match against the Netherlands in which the two sides first competed for the Griffin Cup which became an annual fixture over the following decade.

== Board of Rugby League Deutschland ==
- President: Bob Doughton
- Vice-President: Uwe Jansen
- Director of Rugby: David Griffiths
- Treasurer: Leo Berngruber
- Secretary: Florian Rittner
- Other Board Members: Will Stocks, Dan Stocks, Bob Doughton
