= FC Barcelona Rugby League =

FC Barcelona
Club information
- Full name: Futbol Club Barcelona Rugby Lliga
- Nickname: Barça
- Founded: 2008

Current details
- Chairman: Joan Laporta
- Competition: Catalan Rugby League Championship

Uniforms
Home colours	Away colours

Futbol Club Barcelona Rugby Lliga were the rugby league extension of the FC Barcelona association football club's sporting family, based in Barcelona, Catalonia. They won the Catalonia's Cup in 2008 and joined the Catalan Rugby League Championship in 2010. The sports club's president is Joan Laporta.

== History ==
=== 2008 ===
FC Barcelona's sporting club expanded into rugby league in 2008, after having teams in rugby union, basketball, team handball, futsal, track and field athletics, roller hockey and ice hockey already established in Spanish sport. The club played and won the inaugural Catalonia Cup, a competition featuring developing teams in the region that took place in April 2008 with 3 teams: FC Barcelona, Aligots de Girona and Nord-Català. Barcelona won their first ever competitive rugby league game in their history against Girona Buzzard by 22 points to 20. They then defeated Roussillon 24-4 to win the triangular tournament.

=== 2009 ===
In 2009, the club withdrew from Catalan competitions to strengthen for a bid to join the Catalan Rugby League Championship. They decided to rejoin in 2010 after the first professional rugby league game to take place in Barcelona in 2009, between Catalans Dragons and Warrington Wolves in Super League XIV which attracted a crowd of 18,150, evidently strengthened the popularity of the game in Spain and particularly the Catalan region.

=== 2010 ===
After reforming, the club joined the Catalan Rugby League Championship (CRLC) in 2010; a two-pool league in which Barcelona University Club were the reigning champions from the 2009 season. Barcelona formed something of a rivalry with BUC in the seven-team competition, as both competed concurrently, but in separate pools. It is widely speculated, but purely a hypothesis, that this branch of the successful FC Barcelona club will become members of the Rugby Football League and possibly Super League should the venture prove a success in Catalonia, as they were now playing more competitive rugby, on a more regular basis. Their first ever game was against CR Sant Cugat on 13 May 2010, a game which ended in a disappointing 30-20 loss. They earned their first win of the competition with a 44-30 win at home to GEiEG to give them a hope of qualifying for the finals. And, despite GEiEG winning their last game of the pool against Sant Cugat, Barça were able to qualify for the third and fourth place play-off, where they played CE INEF Lleida, in a narrow 36-30 loss.

== Honours ==
- Catalonia Cup: 1

2008

== See also ==
- Rugby league in Catalonia
- Rugby league in Spain
