= Rugby in Germany =

Rugby in Germany may refer to:

- Rugby league in Germany
- Rugby union in Germany
