= Rugby in Estonia =

Rugby in Estonia may refer to:

- Rugby league in Estonia
- Rugby union in Estonia
