= Austria national rugby league team =

Austria
Team information
- Governing body: Austria Rugby League
- Region: European

Team results
- First international
- Germany 34–32 Austria (Bad Reichenhall, Germany; 25 June 2006)
- Biggest win
- Austria 56–32 Estonia (Tallinn, Germany; 1 September 2006)
- Biggest defeat
- Germany 34–32 Austria (Bad Reichenhall, Germany; 25 June 2006)
- World Cup
- Appearances: 0

The Austrian national rugby league team are the national rugby league team of Austria. They were created to continue the spread of the game of rugby league football throughout Central Europe. Austria have played matches against a number of other European countries and also competed in the Central Europe Development Tri-Nations in 2006 alongside Germany and Estonia.

== Results ==
Date	Opponent	Score	Tournament	Venue	Reports
26 June 2006	Germany	32–34	2006 Central Europe Development Tri-Nations	Nonner Stadium, Bad Reichenhall	
2 September 2006	Estonia	56–32	2006 Central Europe Development Tri-Nations	Paternion Stadium, Austria	
