= Uwe Jansen =

German RL coach, administrator & former Germany international rugby league footballer

Personal information
- Full name: Uwe Jansen

Playing information
- Position: Second-row
Representative
Years	Team	Pld	T	G	FG	P
2006	Germany	1	1	0	0	4

Coaching information
Representative
Years	Team	Gms	W	D	L	W%
2006–08	Germany	4	3	0	1	75
- As of 12 March 2021

Uwe Jansen is a rugby league coach, administrator and former player.

Jansen played for Germany against Estonia in 2006, scoring a try in the 24–38 win.

Jansen coached Germany in four matches, winning three. In the 2008 season he was co-coach of the national side alongside Dan Stocks and also coached the Rohrbach Hornets. Dan Stocks then took over as coach in 2009.

Jansen is currently one of Rugby League Deutschland's board members.

Sporting positions
Preceded by Unknown	Coach Germany; 2006–2008	Succeeded by Dan Stocks
