= Rugby in Sweden =

Rugby in Sweden may refer to:

- Rugby league in Sweden
- Rugby union in Sweden
