= Hungary national rugby league team =

Hungary

Team information
- Nickname: Magyar Bulls
- Governing body: Hungarian Rugby League Federation
- Region: Europe
- Head coach: Jonathan Wilson
- Captain: Dane Weatherill, James Kovac, Nathan Farkas
- Most caps: Simon Kalafusz, Joel saaghy (9)
- IRL ranking: 51st

Team results
- First game
- Hungary 16–38 Czech Republic (Kecskemét, Hungary; July 2011)
- Biggest win
- Hungary 56–4 Poland (Budapest, Hungary; July 2017)
- Biggest defeat
- Hungary 0–90 Greece (Budapest, Hungary; October 2013)
- World Cup
- Appearances: 0

The Hungary national rugby league team, known as the Magyar Bulls, represents Hungary in the sport of rugby league football. Making their debut against the Czech Republic in July 2011, they played their first ranked international against Greece in October 2013.

== History ==
Magyar Bulls RLFC, Hungary's National Rugby league team was founded in Budapest in May 2011 by members of the Budapest Exiles RFC, keen to try rugby league and with an open invitation to other teams in Hungary to send players - all with the objective of honouring an invitation to play in the CEE European Bowl competition vs. the Czech Republic.

From small beginnings on a Monday evening, on Margit Island, in the middle of the Danube, the squad has grown to be able to select a nucleus of 20 players to play against the Czech Republic on 23 July. The pull of playing international RL has seen enquiries to train and play from a number of other clubs in Hungary as well as players of Hungarian origin who have travelled back to play from Italy and the UK.

In June 2013, Hungary was granted Observer status by the RLEF. They subsequently played their first fully sanctioned international against a Greece team featuring professional players Michael Korkidas and Braith Anasta.

In 2014, Tour in Paris again and Hungary competed in the inaugural Balkans Cup tournament in Serbia. This was Hungary's first International tournament. Hungary finished the overall tournament in fourth place. They also made history in the tournament, as they recorded their first ever international try in their match with Bosnia. In 2015 Tour in Belgrade on Euro 9' Tournament.

== Current squad ==
Hungary can call eligible players like Kurt Falls, Blake Mozer and Myles Gal.

Squad selected for the 2018 Emerging Nations World Championship;

- Karoly Acsai
- Benjamin Bronzon
- Mark Czifra
- Andras Eglesz
- Aaron Farkas
- David Farkas
- Jared Farkas
- Nathan Farkas
- Stuart Flanagan
- Jayson Gerecs
- Lenard Grimm
- Istvan Krupp
- Zsolt Lukacs
- Paul McKewin
- Gergely Nagy
- Gyula Nikoletti
- Josh Institoris
- Daniel Ivan
- Paul Ivan
- Simon Kalafusz
- James Kovac
- Stephen Kovacs
- Paul Mozar
- Billy Mozer
- Lachlyn Mulford
- Joel Saaghy
- Shane Stevens
- Joseph Toth
- Cruize Turay
- Josh Warner
- Dane Weatherill
- Brent Varga

== Results ==
A † denotes that the match did not contribute to the RLIF World Rankings.

23 July 2011†; 2011 European Bowl	Hungary	16 – 38	Czech Republic	Kecskemét, Hungary
16:00	Tries: Angel, Haboczki, Torrance; Goals: Torrance (2/3)	[ Report]	Tries: Leeuw (3), Buben (2), Mulhall, Sedina; Goals: Buben (4/6), Mulhall (1/1)

14 July 2012†; 2012 European Bowl	Czech Republic	42 – 16	Hungary	Vrchlabí, Czech Republic
	Tries: Sedina (2), Buben, Cernohorsky, Dolak, Lahr, Sluka, Vrana, Zemanek; Goals: Sedina (3/9)	[ Report]	Tries: Bán, Berbesi, Haboczki; Goals: Bán (2/3)	Stadium: Municipal Stadium; Attendance: 400

27 October 2013	Hungary	0 – 90	Greece	Budapest, Hungary
		[ Report]	Tries: Anasta (4), T. Constantinou (3), Bouris (2), Sell (2), Zampetides (2), Aroutsidis, Nake; Goals: Anasta (15/15)	Stadium: Margitszigeti Atlétikai Centrum; Attendance: 500

17 October 2014; 2014 Balkans Cup	Serbia	50 – 0	Hungary	Belgrade, Serbia
15:00	Tries: Ilić (2), Manak (2), Nikolić (2), Čobanović, Gak, Radovanović; Goals: Vladislav Dedić (7/9)	[ Report]		Stadium: FK Dorćol; Attendance: 150; Referee: George Stilianos

19 October 2014†; 2014 Balkans Cup	Hungary	6 – 32	Bosnia and Herzegovina	Belgrade, Serbia
12:30	Tries: Grimm; Goals: Nikowitz (1/1)	[ Report]	Tries: Kikanović, Kulašević, E. Martić, Sakan, Zec, Zekić; Goals: Kikanović (3/5), Dedić (1/1)	Stadium: Makiš Stadium; Attendance: 100; Referee: Radoslav Novaković

4 February 2017	Hungary	50 – 4	Uruguay	Sydney, Australia
17:30	Tries: N. Farkas (2), Varga (2), Acsai, A. Fricska, D. Farkas, Institoris, R. Németh; Goals: A. Farkas (6/7), J. Farkas (0/1), S. Németh (0/1)		Tries: N. Cama; Goals: ? (0/1)	Stadium: Hillier Oval

8 February 2017	Hungary	44 – 10	Thailand	Sydney, Australia
20:15	Tries: McKewin (2), Acsai, A Farkas, D. Farkas, J. Farkas, Institoris, Varga; Goals: A. Farkas (4/5), D. Farkas (2/2), J. Farkas (0/1)		Tries: Choengkhiri, Waugh; Goals: Twigg (1/2)	Stadium: Endeavour Sports High School

15 July 2017†	Hungary	56 – 4	Poland	Budapest, Hungary
		[ Report]

22 July 2017	Hungary	6 – 26	Czech Republic	Budapest, Hungary
	Tries: Nemes; Goals: Orsi	[ Report]	Tries: Gach, Hudrlík, Košťál, Mećava, Vojtěch; Goals: Řičica (3/5)	Stadium: KFKI Sporttelep

14 October 2017	Malta	48 – 16	Hungary	Sydney, Australia
16:30	Tries: Vassallo (2), Attard, Benson, Campbell, Catania, Falzon, Glanville, Mazzelli; Goals: Glanville (6/9)	[ Report]	Tries: Kovác (2), Varga; Goals: J. Farkas (2/3)	Stadium: Cabramatta Leagues Stadium; Referee: Luke Heckendorf

5 November 2017	Philippines	72 – 0	Hungary	Bangkok, Thailand
	Tries: Casinay 2, Cortez 2, Mackey 2, Stephenson 2, Goodwin Laderas, Osias, Russell, Sheedy; Goals: Casinay (7), Russell (3)	[ Report]		Stadium: Mahasarakham Institute of Sporting Excellence

8 November 2017†	Hungary	44 – 28	ASEAN XIII	Bangkok, Thailand
		[ Report]		Stadium: Mahasarakham Institute of Sporting Excellence

3 February 2018	Hungary	30 – 12	Philippines	Gold Coast, Australia
18:00	Tries: Brucker (2), Flanagan (2), Kovác; Goals: J. Farkas (5/6)		Tries: Sheedy, Swanson; Goals: Zappia (2/2)	Stadium: Betty Diamond Sporting Complex

18 February 2018†	Malta	40 – 28	Hungary	Sydney, Australia
14:00				Stadium: St Marys Leagues Stadium

1 October 2018; 2018 Emerging Nations World Cup	Greece	18 – 20	Hungary	Sydney, Australia
17:00	Tries: Mamouzelos, Stratis, A. Vrahnos; Goals: Stratis (3/3)	[ Report]	Tries: D. Ivan, Kovac, Turay, Varga; Goals: J. Farkas (2/4)	Stadium: Windsor Sporting Complex

4 October 2018; 2018 Emerging Nations World Cup	Hungary	18 – 13	Vanuatu	Sydney, Australia
17:00	Tries: Nathan Farkas, Jayson Gerecss; Goals: Stratis (3/3)	[ Report]	Tries: D. Ivan, Kovac, Turay, Varga; Goals: J. Farkas (1/2)	Stadium: St Marys Leagues Stadium

== IRL Rankings ==
IRL Men's World Rankings
Official rankings as of December 2025
Rank	Change	Team	Pts %
1	Steady	Australia	100
2	Steady	New Zealand	82
3	Steady	England	74
4	Steady	Samoa	56
5	Steady	Tonga	54
6	Steady	Papua New Guinea	47
7	Steady	Fiji	34
8	Steady	France	24
9	Steady	Cook Islands	24
10	Steady	Serbia	23
11	Steady	Netherlands	22
12	Steady	Ukraine	21
13	Steady	Wales	18
14	Steady	Ireland	17
15	Steady	Greece	15
16	Steady	Malta	15
17	Steady	Italy	11
18	Steady	Jamaica	9
19	▲1	Poland	7
20	▲1	Lebanon	7
21	▲1	Norway	7
22	▼3	United States	7
23	Steady	Germany	7
24	Steady	Czech Republic	6
25	Steady	Chile	6
26	▲1	Philippines	5
27	▲1	Scotland	5
28	▼2	South Africa	5
29	▲1	Canada	5
30	▼1	Brazil	3
31	▲1	Morocco	3
32	▲1	North Macedonia	3
33	▲1	Argentina	3
34	▲1	Montenegro	3
35	▲4	Ghana	2
36	▼5	Kenya	2
37	▲3	Nigeria	2
38	▼2	Albania	1
39	▼2	Turkey	1
40	▼2	Bulgaria	1
41	▲1	Cameroon	0
42	▲1	Japan	0
43	▲1	Spain	0
44	▼3	Colombia	0
45	Steady	Russia	0
46	Steady	El Salvador	0
47	Steady	Bosnia and Herzegovina	0
48	Steady	Hong Kong	0
49	Steady	Solomon Islands	0
50	Steady	Vanuatu	0
51	Steady	Hungary	0
52	Steady	Latvia	0
53	Steady	Denmark	0
54	Steady	Belgium	0
55	Steady	Estonia	0
56	Steady	Sweden	0
57	Steady	Niue	0
Complete rankings at www.internationalrugbyleague.com

== See also ==
- Hungarian Rugby League Federation
