= Belgium national rugby league team =

Belgium

Team information
- Nickname: Golden Lions
- Governing body: Rugby League Belgium
- Region: Europe
- Head coach: Valu Bentley
- Captain: Damien Parée
- Home stadium: Centre Sportif de Neder Over Hembeek
- IRL ranking: 54th

Uniforms
First colours

Team results
- First game
- Belgium 28–22 Catalonia (Wavre, Belgium; 25 July 2009)
- Biggest win
- Belgium 60–12 Netherlands (Rotterdam, Netherlands; 2 May 2015)
- Biggest defeat
- Spain 54–10 Belgium (Moncada, Spain; 8 June 2014)

The Belgium national rugby league team represents Belgium in the sport of rugby league football.

== History ==
The success of the 2008 Rugby League World Cup resulted in a popularity surge for the sport around the world. As a result, a number of new nations took up the sport. Belgium followed this trend in 2009. Rugby League Belgium was started with a single franchise, Brabant Wallon Wavre Rugby XIII, and the creation of a national side to participate in the RLEF Euro Med Challenge and other international matches.

Under new President Yves-Michael Kazadi, Belgium were granted observer membership of the Rugby League European Federation in June 2013.

Their first international competition was in the 2009 RLEF Euro Med Challenge against Catalonia and Morocco. In their first international, Belgium defeated Catalonia in front of a home crowd in Wavre. Belgium came in second in the Euro Med Challenge 2009, losing to Morocco 46-12. Following this tournament, the national team took a 4-year hiatus before being granted affiliate RLEF membership and returning to international competition in 2013.

== Competitive record ==
=== Overall ===
Team	First Played	Played	Win	Draw	Loss	Points For	Points Against	Last played
Catalonia	2009	1	1	0	0	28	22	2009
Czech Republic	2015	2	1	0	1	54	26	2015
Germany	2016	1	1	0	0	26	12	2016
Ireland	2015	1	0	0	1	0	34	2015
Malta	2015	1	0	0	1	34	35	2015
Morocco	2009	1	0	0	1	12	46	2009
Netherlands	2013	4	4	0	0	150	48	2016
Spain	2014	2	0	0	2	20	66	2014
Total		13	7	0	6	324	289	

=== Results ===
Year	Date	Result	Venue	City	Attendance	Competition	Report
2009	25 July	Belgium def. Catalonia 28-22		Wavre, Belgium	400	Euro-Med Challenge	match report
2009	15 August	Morocco def. Belgium 46-16	Stade de la Meditérrannée	Beziers, France		Euro-Med Challenge	match report
2013	29 June	Belgium def. Netherlands 22-6		Delft, Netherlands		International friendly	match report
2014	24 May	Spain def. Belgium 12-10	Centre Sportif	Neder-Over-Heembeek, Belgium		International friendly	match report
2014	8 June	Spain def. Belgium 54-10	Campo de Rugby la Pelosa	Moncada, Spain		International friendly	match report
2014	28 June	Belgium def. Netherlands 32-16	Centre Sportif	Neder-Over-Heembeek, Belgium		Tri-Nation Challenge Cup	match report
2015	18 April	Belgium def. Czech Republic 50-12	Domaine van Puyenbroek	Brussels, Belgium		International Friendly	match report
2015	2 May	Belgium def. Netherlands 60-12		Rotterdam, Netherlands		International Friendly	match report
2015	21 June	Malta def. Belgium 35-34	Headingley Carnegie Stadium	Leeds, England		International Friendly	match report
2015	12 July	Ireland def. Belgium 38-0	Carlisle Grounds	Bray, Ireland		International Friendly	match report
2015	3 October	Czech Republic def. Belgium 14-4		Tis, Czech Republic		International Friendly	match report

== IRL Rankings ==
IRL Men's World Rankings
Official rankings as of December 2025
Rank	Change	Team	Pts %
1	Steady	Australia	100
2	Steady	New Zealand	82
3	Steady	England	74
4	Steady	Samoa	56
5	Steady	Tonga	54
6	Steady	Papua New Guinea	47
7	Steady	Fiji	34
8	Steady	France	24
9	Steady	Cook Islands	24
10	Steady	Serbia	23
11	Steady	Netherlands	22
12	Steady	Ukraine	21
13	Steady	Wales	18
14	Steady	Ireland	17
15	Steady	Greece	15
16	Steady	Malta	15
17	Steady	Italy	11
18	Steady	Jamaica	9
19	▲1	Poland	7
20	▲1	Lebanon	7
21	▲1	Norway	7
22	▼3	United States	7
23	Steady	Germany	7
24	Steady	Czech Republic	6
25	Steady	Chile	6
26	▲1	Philippines	5
27	▲1	Scotland	5
28	▼2	South Africa	5
29	▲1	Canada	5
30	▼1	Brazil	3
31	▲1	Morocco	3
32	▲1	North Macedonia	3
33	▲1	Argentina	3
34	▲1	Montenegro	3
35	▲4	Ghana	2
36	▼5	Kenya	2
37	▲3	Nigeria	2
38	▼2	Albania	1
39	▼2	Turkey	1
40	▼2	Bulgaria	1
41	▲1	Cameroon	0
42	▲1	Japan	0
43	▲1	Spain	0
44	▼3	Colombia	0
45	Steady	Russia	0
46	Steady	El Salvador	0
47	Steady	Bosnia and Herzegovina	0
48	Steady	Hong Kong	0
49	Steady	Solomon Islands	0
50	Steady	Vanuatu	0
51	Steady	Hungary	0
52	Steady	Latvia	0
53	Steady	Denmark	0
54	Steady	Belgium	0
55	Steady	Estonia	0
56	Steady	Sweden	0
57	Steady	Niue	0
Complete rankings at www.internationalrugbyleague.com
