= Nationaler Rugby League Deutschland =

Sports governing body in Germany

Rugby League Deutschland
- Founded: 2014
- IRL affiliation: 2017
- Responsibility: Germany

(Germany)

The Nationaler Rugby League Deutschland e.V. (NRLD) is the governing body for the sport of rugby league football in Germany. It was established in September 2014 and in June 2015 it was appointed as the national governing body for the sport replacing the Rugby League Deutschland which had been founded in 2005 and affiliated with the Rugby League European Federation (RLEF) since 2007, but folded in March 2015. The NRLD became an affiliate member of the RLEF in December 2017.

== See also ==
- Rugby league in Germany
- Germany national rugby league team
