= Hungarian Rugby League Federation =

Sports governing body in Hungary

- Founded: 2009
- RLEF affiliation: (Official observer)
- Responsibility: Hungary
- Website: www.hrlf.hu

(Hungary)
- As of 8 12 2019

The Hungarian Rugby League Federation (Hungarian: Magyar Ligarögbi Szövetség) was established as a nonprofit non-governmental organisation in 2013 by three Hungarians: Zsolt Lukács, Zsolt Habóczki and Bálint Mézes.

== Description ==
In 2013, it became a member of the Rugby League European Federation with Observer status.

It organises the national team's matches, events and training sessions.

The organisation currently has two officials: Zsolt Lukács (match official) and Bálint Mézes (Trainer).

In June 2026, the federation had its observer member status of International Rugby League withdrawn.

== See also ==
- Hungary national rugby league team
