= Griffin Cup =

Annual rugby league fixture

- Contested by
| Germany | Netherlands |
| Sport | Rugby league |
| First held | 2013 |
| Current champion | Germany |
- Number of wins
| Germany | Netherlands |
| 6 | 6 |
- Draws: None

The Griffin Cup is an annual rugby league fixture between the national teams of Germany and the Netherlands that has been contested since 2013.

== Results ==
List of Griffin Cup matches
| Year | Winners | Final score | Runners-up | Venue | Location | Attendance | Ref(s) |
|---|---|---|---|---|---|---|---|
| 2013 | Germany | 28–22 | Netherlands | | (Germany) Heidelberg | | |
| 2014 | Germany | 70–16 | Netherlands | Biesland Sports Complex | (Netherlands) Delft | | |
| 2015 | Germany | 46–12 | Netherlands | Fritz Grunbaum Sportpark | (Germany) Karlsruhe | | |
| 2016 | Germany | 8–6 | Netherlands | Biesland Sports Complex | (Netherlands) Delft | | |
| 2017 | Netherlands | 30–18 | Germany | Barenteich | (Germany) Osnabrück | 200 | |
| 2018 | Netherlands | 38–22 | Germany | Sparta Rugby | (Netherlands) Rotterdam | 300 | |
| 2019 | Netherlands | 56–18 | Germany | Sportplatz Brilliter Weg | (Germany) Gnarrenburg | | |
| 2020 | Netherlands | 20–18 | Germany | RC Zwolle | (Netherlands) Zwolle | | |
| 2021* | Netherlands | 48–16 | Germany | Düsseldorf Rugby Club | (Germany) Düsseldorf | | |
| 2022 | Germany | 29–24 | Netherlands | British School | (Netherlands) Voorschoten | 500 | |
| 2023 | Netherlands | 44–18 | Germany | Althoffstadion | (Germany) Hattingen | 800 | |
| 2026 | Germany | 28–14 | Netherlands | Zaandijk Rugby Club | (Netherlands) Zaandam | | |

- The 2021 fixture was played in three periods of thirty minutes rather than the standard two periods of forty minutes. This means that this fixture is not recognised as a senior international match.
