= 2006 Central Europe Development Tri-Nations =

- Duration: 1 Round
- Number of teams: 3
- Winners: Germany
- Runners-up: Austria

The inaugural Central Europe Development Tri-Nations rugby league competition was held in 2006. This competition is organised by the Rugby League European Federation and was designed to promote the sport of rugby league in Central Europe. The competition, contested by Austria, Germany and Estonia, was won by Germany.

== Results ==
2006-06-25

Germany	34–32	Austria

Nonner Stadion, Bad Reichenhall
Attendance: 358

2006-07-22

Estonia	24–38	Germany

Viimsi Stadium, Tallinn
Attendance: 528

2006-09-02

Austria	56–32	Estonia

Paternion Stadium, Paternion
Attendance: 237

== Standings ==
Team	Played	Won	Drew	Lost	For	Against	Difference	Points
Germany	2	2	0	0	72	56	+16	4
Austria	2	1	0	1	88	66	+22	2
Estonia	2	0	0	2	56	94	−38	0
