= 2015 Rugby League European Championship C =

2015 European Championship C
- Number of teams: 3
- Winner: Spain (1st title)
- Matches played: 3
- Top try scorer: (Spain) Daniel Garcia (3)

The 2015 European Championship C tournament was the eighth staging of the Rugby League European Bowl tournament played in the respective European countries participating between 26 September to 17 October 2015.

== Qualification ==
A preliminary match was played between Latvia and Spain on 9 May 2015 for the third place in the competition.

9 May 2015
15:00

Latvia	12–32	Spain
Tries: Ozols 56'; Gabrāns 62'; Garokalns 79'; Goals: Brovackis 0/2; Bajārs 0/1	Report	Tries: Pérez-Fuster 8'; D'Alessandro (3) 27', 35', 38, Pilkington 46'; Garcia 78'; Goals: Garcia 3/6; Pilkington 1/1

Upesciema Stadionā, Riga
Attendance: 150
Referee: (England) Chris Hancock
Player of the Match: (Latvia) Mikus Ozols, (Spain) Daniel Garcia

== Standings ==
Pos	Team	Pld	W	D	L	PF	PA	PD	Pts	Qualification
1	Spain	2	2	0	0	116	34	+82	4	Advance to 2017 World Cup European qualification tournament
2	Malta	2	1	0	1	60	40	+20	2	
3	Greece	2	0	0	2	4	106	−102	0	

== Fixtures ==
The winner of the competition will join the top three 2014–15 European Championship B nations along with Ireland and Wales in a two group round robin competition to qualify for the 2017 Rugby League World Cup.

26 September 2015
18:00

Spain	40–30	Malta
Tries: Morro; Garcia (3); O'Doutres; Puerta; Pilkington; Goals: Garcia 6/7	Report	Tries: Blyton-Keep; Francois Hussain; Burke Zarb; Lynch; Goals: Blyton-Keep 5/5

Polideportivo Quatre Carreres, Valencia
Player of the Match: (Spain) Daniel Garcia

FB	1	Daniel Garcia
RW	2	Hadriel Mehamed González
RC	3	Alex O'Doutres
LC	4	Antonio Puerta
LW	5	Diego Lagunas
SO	6	Ivan Mendez
SH	7	Miguel Blanco
PR	8	Luis Thorp
HK	9	Gonzalo Morro
PR	10	Dani Moreno
SR	11	Cedric Bringuier
SR	12	Matt Dulley
LF	13	Aitor Davila
Substitutions:
IC	14	Ezequiel Perez-Fuster
IC	15	Andy Pilkington
IC	16	Isaac Pulgar
IC	17	Adrian Alonso
Coach:
Darren Fisher

FB	1	Andrew Muscat
RW	2	Jean-Pierre Zarb
RC	3	Sam Blyton-Keep
LC	4	Christian Briffa
LW	5	Zachariah Micallef
FE	6	Robin Cutajar
HB	7	Danny Burke
PR	8	Jeremy Dela
HK	9	Justin Barlogio
PR	10	Pete Debono
SR	11	Jake Lynch
SR	12	Pete Ingham
LK	13	Chris Parker
Substitutions:
IC	14	Shan Francois Hussain
IC	15	Joe Paolella
IC	16	Joseph Pio Mizzi
IC	17	Sam Firth
Coach:
Chris Parker

10 October 2015

Malta	30–0^{1}	Greece

Marsa

Notes

1. Malta were awarded a 30-0 victory by the RLEF after Greece defaulted. The Hellenic Federation of Rugby League has struggled to keep financially stable due to Greece's recent economic troubles. The Greek side was unable to make the trip to Malta following the withdrawal of two sponsors.

17 October 2015
16:30

Greece	4–76	Spain
Tries: Roussos 57'; Goals: Koutsimbogiorgos 0/1	Report	Tries: Puerta (2) 11', 47'; Lopez (2) 24', 64'; Lagunas (2) 33', 75'; Doutres 4'; Blanco 7'; Dulley 16'; Morro 18'; Mehamed González 27'; Thorp 61'; Perez-Fuster 68'; Bringuier 78'; Goals: Doutres 8/12; Ivan Mendez 1/1; Aitor Davila 1/1

Athens

FB	1	Pavlos Polymeneas
RW	2	Alexandros Kesipis
RC	3	Konstantinos Arvanitis
LC	4	Giannis Giannimaras
LW	5	Andreas Psarakis
SO	6	Panagiotis Varypatis
SH	7	Grigoris Koutsimbogiorgos
PR	8	Panagiotis Papadopoulos
HK	9	Kostas Roussos
PR	10	Artemis Pittaras
SR	11	Panagiotis Karefilis
SR	12	Alexandros Goumas
LF	13	Konstantinos Lambrakis
Substitutions:
IC	14	Vasilis Ventoyrae
IC	15	Giorgos Zdanov
IC	16	Touki Arimanana
IC	17	Giorgin Syti
Coach:
Matthew Ashill

FB	1	Alex Doutres
RW	2	Hadriel Mehamed González
RC	3	Antonio Puerta
LC	4	Andy Pilkington
LW	5	Chris Lopez
FE	6	Ivan Mendez
HB	7	Miguel Blanco
PR	8	Luis Thorp
HK	9	Gonzalo Morro
PR	10	Adrian Alonso
SR	11	Cedric Bringuier
SR	12	Matt Dulley
LK	13	Aitor Davila
Substitutions:
IC	14	Diego Lagunas
IC	15	Ezequiel Perez-Fuster
IC	16	Dani Moreno
IC	17	Jose Manuel Munoz
Coach:
Darren Fisher

== See also ==
- 2017 Rugby League World Cup qualification
