= Catalonia national rugby league team =

Catalonia
Team information
- Governing body: Associació Catalana de Rugby Lliga
- Region: Europe
- Head coach: Eric Delherbe
- Captain: Albert Homs

Uniforms
First colours

Team results
- First game
- Catalonia 12–62 Morocco (Perpignan, 21 June 2008)
- Biggest win
- Czech Republic 16–66 Catalonia (Prague, 10 July 2010)
- Biggest defeat
- Catalonia 12–62 Morocco (Perpignan, 21 June 2008)

The Catalonia national rugby league team represents Catalonia in the sport of rugby league football, running under the auspices of the Associació Catalana de Rugby Lliga.

== History ==
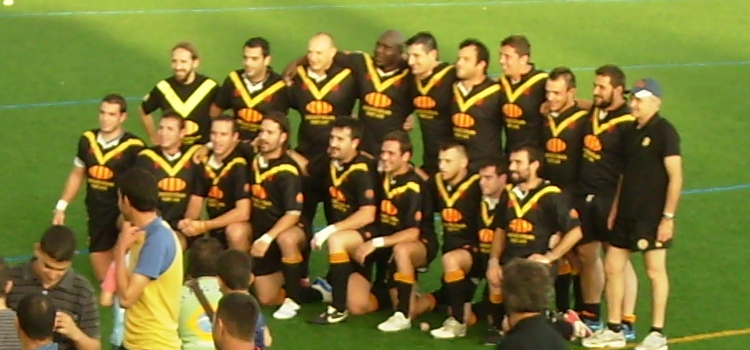
Catalonia national rugby league team in 2009

Rugby league started in Catalonia in autumn 2007, with the advice of people from the French Catalan region, where this sport has been played since the 1930s.

The number of clubs grew since 3 clubs participated in the first competition in southern Catalonia in 2008 (FC Barcelona, Aligots Girona and Nord-Català), to reach 9 teams in the first Catalonia Championships in April 2009: CR Tarragona, CR Valls, CR Sant Cugat, INEF Lleida, GEiEG, Poble Nou Enginyers, BUC, RC Garrotxa and Vic Crancs. Also, the first Rugby League Catalan University Championship was played in February 2009, with 9 teams in competition.

Catalonia used to be an unranked member of the Rugby League European Federation; however, their participation in some international rugby league competitions, such as the World Cup, has been questioned as Catalonia is not a sovereign nation.

Catalonia played their first match in January 2008 when they participated in the French Interleague Championship held near Perpignan, France. In June of the same year, Morocco beat Catalonia in a match played in Perpignan, 62–12.

In June 2009, Catalonia beat the Czech Republic in a match played prior to the Catalans Dragons vs Warrington Wolves Super League game. This match was an international warm-up ahead of the Euro Med Challenge contested by Catalonia, Morocco and Belgium. They lost 6–29 at home to Morocco, and 28–22 at Belgium.

In 2010 Catalonia played only friendlies, with a win over Czech Republic 16–66 in Prague.

Following further disputes over their RLEF status, the Catalonia national team did not subsequently participate in international competition and their RLEF affiliation was later dropped. They are currently not active in international competition, and any further international activity will likely fall under the umbrella of the Spain national rugby league team.

== Players ==
=== 2009 ===
Catalonia vs. Morocco, 4 July 2009

Name	Club	Debut
Julien Lebon	CNPN Enginyers	
Pau Puigdollers	CR Sant Cugat	
Jose A. Pleguezuelos	CR Tarragona	
Fernando Fernández	BUC	
Roger Ferraté	BUC	2008
Albert Homs	GEiEG	2008
Aitor Figueruelo	BUC	
Calvin Tchoumi	CE INEF Lleida	
Joan Miquel Petanàs	CE INEF Lleida	
Sergi Petanàs	CE INEF Lleida	
Sebastién Amigas	UTC	
Jordi Giménez		
Sergi Calzada	BUC	
Marc López	CNPN Enginyers	
Ermengol Alemany	BUC	
Raül Vall-llosada	CA Vic Crancs	2008
Christian Pelissier	GEiEG	
Jordi Sánchez	CNPN Enginyers	

Catalonia vs. Belgium, 25 July 2009.

Name	Club	Debut
Ermengol Alemany	BUC	
Sergi Petanàs	CE INEF Lleida	
Roger Ferraté	BUC	2008
Aitor Figueruelo	BUC	
Pau Puigdollers	CR Sant Cugat	
Raül Vall-llosada	Vic	2008
Sergi Calzada	BUC	
Jose A. Pleguezuelos	CR Tarragona	
Calvin Tchoumi	CE INEF Lleida	
Joan Miquel Petanàs	CE INEF Lleida	
Albert Homs	GEiEG	2008
Joaquim Sala	GEiEG	
Òscar Mercè	CE INEF Lleida	
Juan Pablo Pistone	BUC	
Jordi Pallàs	RC Garrotxa	
Julien Lebon	CNPN Enginyers	
Javier López	BUC	

=== 2010 ===
Catalonia vs. Czech Republic, July 10, 2010.

Name	Position	Club
Pau Puigdollers	Fullback	CR Sant Cugat
Raül Vall-llosada	Wing	Free Agent
Richard Cottrell	Centre	Free Agent
Xavi Zubero	Centre	BUC
Marc Forman	Wing	CR Sant Cugat
Alex Carrasco	Five-eighth	Free Agent
Ermengol Alemany	Halfback	BUC
Mariano Lago	Prop	GEiEG
Joan Porras	Hooker	BUC
Joan Miquel Petanàs	Prop	CE INEF Lleida
Òscar Mercè	Second-row	CE INEF Lleida
Sergio Calzada	Second-row	BUC
Albert Homs	Loose forward	GEiEG
Julien Lebon	Interchange	CNPN Enginyers
Calvin Tchoumi	Interchange	CE INEF Lleida
Jose Plegueauelos	Interchange	CR Tarragona
Joaquim Sala	Interchange	GEiEG
Javier López	Reserve	BUC
Marco Pasarello	Reserve	Free Agent

== Competitive record ==
=== Overall ===
Team	1st Played	Play	Win	Draw	Loss	Points For	Points Agn.
Morocco	2008	2	0	0	2	18	91
Czech Republic	2009	2	2	0	0	118	26
Belgium	2009	1	0	0	1	22	28

=== Results ===
==== French championships interleagues ====
French championships interleagues – Short game
Date	Opponents	Result	Venue	Crowd	Competition
26 January 2008	Languedoc-Roussillon	0–24	Saint-Laurent-de-la-Salanque	200	French Interleague Championship
27 January 2008	Provence-Alpes-Côte d'Azur	4–14	Saint-Laurent-de-la-Salanque	200	French Interleague Championship
27 January 2008	Île-de-France	14–26	Saint-Laurent-de-la-Salanque	200	French Interleague Championship

==== Internationals ====
Date	Home	Result	Away	Competition	Venue	Crowd
7 June 2008	Catalonia	18–64	(France) French Universities	Friendly	(Catalonia) University of Girona, Girona	150
21 June 2008	Catalonia	12–62	Morocco	Friendly	(Catalonia) Stade Gilbert Brutus, Perpignan	2,000
20 June 2009	Catalonia	52–10	Czech Republic	Friendly	(Catalonia) Estadi Olímpic Lluís Companys, Barcelona	18,150
4 July 2009	Catalonia	6–29	Morocco	RLEF Euro Med Challenge	(Catalonia) Torroella de Montgrí	1,000
10 July 2010	Czech Republic	16–66	Catalonia	Friendly	(Czech Republic) Prague	
25 July 2009	Belgium	28–22	Catalonia	RLEF Euro Med Challenge	(Belgium) Wavre	400

== See also ==
- Associació Catalana de Rugby Lliga
- Rugby League European Federation
- Catalans Dragons
