= Sweden Rugby League =

Sports governing body in Sweden

- Founded: 9 January 2009
- IRL affiliation: Observer membership status with the RLEF
- Responsibility: Sweden
- Competitions: Sweden Super League
- Website: www.swedenrugbyleague.com

(Sweden)

The Sweden Rugby League is the governing body for the sport of rugby league football in Sweden. The Association was formed in 2009. The Swedish rugby league international side debuted in 2010 against their neighbours Norway. In 2011, Sweden Rugby League was given Observer status by the Rugby League European Federation.

== See also ==
- Rugby league in Sweden
- Sweden national rugby league team
