= Denmark national rugby league team =

Denmark

Team information
- Nickname: The Lions (Løverne)
- Governing body: Dansk Rugby League
- Region: Europe
- Head coach: Nigel Kitching
- Captain: Eugene Hanrahan
- Home stadium: Parken Stadium
- IRL ranking: 53rd

Team results
- First game
- Denmark 26–28 Norway (Copenhagen, Denmark; 22 August 2009)
- Biggest win
- Denmark 122–8 Sweden (Gladsaxe Stadium, Copenhagen; 28 April 2012)
- Biggest defeat
- Denmark 12–74 Malta (Gladsaxe Stadium, Copenhagen; 29 September 2012)

The Denmark national rugby league team represents Denmark in the sport of rugby league.

== History ==
Denmark began participating in rugby league in late 2008. The national team played their first match in 2009, losing 28–26 to Norway in Copenhagen.

They won their first match in 2011 during the Nordic Cup, contested between Denmark, Norway and Sweden. In 2014, they defeated Sweden and Norway to become the first team to win the Nordic Cup twice. They then became the first team to retain the Nordic Cup in 2015 after beating Sweden and Norway again to claim their third trophy.

== Competitive record ==
=== Overall ===
Team	First Played	Played	Win	Draw	Loss	Points for	Points against	Last meeting
Norway	2009	7	4	0	3	184	150	2017
Sweden	2011	6	5	0	1	310	104	2016
Malta	2012	2	0	0	2	24	98	2012
TOTAL		15	9	0	6	518	352	

=== Results ===
Date	Home	Score	Away	Competition	Venue	Attendance	Report
19 August 2017	Denmark	24–46	Norway	Nordic Cup 2017	Copenhagen, Denmark	N/A	
7 August 2016	Denmark	50–18	Sweden	Nordic Cup 2016	Copenhagen, Denmark	N/A	
13 June 2015	Denmark	24–12	Norway	Nordic Cup 2015	Copenhagen, Denmark	N/A	
24 May 2015	Sweden	16–30	Denmark	Nordic Cup 2015	Belgrade, Serbia	N/A	
16 August 2014	Denmark	44–6	Sweden	Nordic Cup 2014	Copenhagen, Denmark	N/A	
28 Jun 2014	Norway	10–16	Denmark	Nordic Cup 2014	Oslo, Norway	N/A	
17 August 2013	Denmark	60–10	Norway	Nordic Cup 2013	Copenhagen, Denmark	N/A	
3 August 2013	Sweden	38–12	Denmark	Nordic Cup 2013	Lund, Sweden	N/A	
29 September 2012	Denmark	12–74	Malta	International Series 2012	Copenhagen, Denmark	313	
4 August 2012	Norway	36–6	Denmark	Nordic Cup 2012	Oslo, Norway	N/A	
9 June 2012	Malta	24–12	Denmark	International Series 2012	Hamrun, Malta	100	
28 April 2012	Denmark	122–8	Sweden	Nordic Cup 2012	Copenhagen, Denmark	500	
2 October 2011	Denmark	28–8	Norway	Nordic Cup 2011	Copenhagen, Denmark	486	
2 July 2011	Sweden	18–52	Denmark	Nordic Cup 2011	Gothenburg, Sweden	N/A	
22 August 2009	Denmark	26–28	Norway	Friendly	Copenhagen, Denmark	N/A	

== Honours ==
- Nordic Cup (3): 2011, 2014, 2015

== IRL Rankings ==
IRL Men's World Rankings
Official rankings as of December 2025
Rank	Change	Team	Pts %
1	Steady	Australia	100
2	Steady	New Zealand	82
3	Steady	England	74
4	Steady	Samoa	56
5	Steady	Tonga	54
6	Steady	Papua New Guinea	47
7	Steady	Fiji	34
8	Steady	France	24
9	Steady	Cook Islands	24
10	Steady	Serbia	23
11	Steady	Netherlands	22
12	Steady	Ukraine	21
13	Steady	Wales	18
14	Steady	Ireland	17
15	Steady	Greece	15
16	Steady	Malta	15
17	Steady	Italy	11
18	Steady	Jamaica	9
19	▲1	Poland	7
20	▲1	Lebanon	7
21	▲1	Norway	7
22	▼3	United States	7
23	Steady	Germany	7
24	Steady	Czech Republic	6
25	Steady	Chile	6
26	▲1	Philippines	5
27	▲1	Scotland	5
28	▼2	South Africa	5
29	▲1	Canada	5
30	▼1	Brazil	3
31	▲1	Morocco	3
32	▲1	North Macedonia	3
33	▲1	Argentina	3
34	▲1	Montenegro	3
35	▲4	Ghana	2
36	▼5	Kenya	2
37	▲3	Nigeria	2
38	▼2	Albania	1
39	▼2	Turkey	1
40	▼2	Bulgaria	1
41	▲1	Cameroon	0
42	▲1	Japan	0
43	▲1	Spain	0
44	▼3	Colombia	0
45	Steady	Russia	0
46	Steady	El Salvador	0
47	Steady	Bosnia and Herzegovina	0
48	Steady	Hong Kong	0
49	Steady	Solomon Islands	0
50	Steady	Vanuatu	0
51	Steady	Hungary	0
52	Steady	Latvia	0
53	Steady	Denmark	0
54	Steady	Belgium	0
55	Steady	Estonia	0
56	Steady	Sweden	0
57	Steady	Niue	0
Complete rankings at www.internationalrugbyleague.com

== Promotion ==
Since 2013, the Denmark rugby league team have promoted the Cystic Fibrosis Forening, the national cystic fibrosis association of Denmark.

== See also ==
- Danish Rugby League Championship
- Denmark Rugby League Federation
