= Latvia national rugby league team =

Latvian national sports team

Latvia

Team information
- Governing body: Latvia Rugby League
- Region: Europe
- Head coach: Steve Leonard (GBR)
- Captain: Jānis Zuments
- IRL ranking: 52nd

Uniforms
First colours

Team results
- First international
- Estonia 38 - 54 Latvia (21 October 2007, Tallinn)
- Biggest win
- Estonia 4 - 74 Latvia (8 August 2009, Tallinn)
- Biggest defeat
- Ukraine 112 - 0 Latvia (18 September 2010, Kyiv )

The Latvia national rugby league team was established in 2008 to represent Latvia at rugby league football.

== History ==
Latvia initially competed in the European Bowl, for fourth-tier developing nations. They beat Estonia in a two-game series and therefore won the inaugural tournament after Ukraine could not gain visas to travel. In 2009 they finished in second place after losing to Ukraine and defeating Estonia. In 2010 they played in the European Shield, losing to Russia and Ukraine.

In April 2015, the qualification process for the 2017 World Cup was announced. The 2015 Rugby League European Championship C tournament served as part of this process and on 9 May 2015 Latvia played Spain in a preliminary match for the right to compete in the championship alongside Greece and Malta. Latvia lost the match 32–22 and as a result of this were eliminated from the world cup qualifiers.

In 2024, the Latvian federation was expelled from International Rugby League due to "several years" of inactivity, thus the team is currently dormant.

== Results ==
=== Overall ===
Team	First Played	Played	Win	Draw	Loss	Points For	Points Against	Last Meeting
Estonia	2007	4	4	0	0	238	62	2009
Ukraine	2009	2	0	0	2	6	152	2010
Russia	2010	1	0	0	1	4	54	2010
Spain	2015	1	0	0	1	12	32	2015
TOTAL		8	4	0	4	260	300	

=== World Cup ===
World Cup record
Year	Round	Position	GP	W	L	D
(Australia) (New Zealand) 2017	Failed to qualify					
Total	0 Titles	0/13	0	0	0	0

=== Results ===
Opponent	Points	Date	Venue	Report
Estonia	54 - 38	2007-10-21	Tallinn	
Estonia	48 - 10	2008-06-28	Tallinn	
Estonia	62 - 10	2008-08-03	Riga	
Ukraine	6 - 40	2009-07-24	Riga	
Estonia	74 - 4	2009-08-08	Tallinn	
Russia	4 - 54	2010-07-31	Riga	
Ukraine	0 - 112	2010-09-18	Kyiv	
Spain	12 - 32	2015-05-09	Riga	

== IRL Rankings ==
IRL Men's World Rankings
Official rankings as of August 2026
Rank	Change	Team	Pts %
1	Steady	Australia	100
2	Steady	New Zealand	82
3	Steady	England	70
4	Steady	Samoa	56
5	Steady	Tonga	54
6	Steady	Papua New Guinea	47
7	Steady	Fiji	34
8	▲1	Cook Islands	24
9	▲2	Netherlands	23
10	▲2	Ukraine	21
11	▼3	France	21
12	▼2	Serbia	20
13	Steady	Wales	18
14	Steady	Ireland	17
15	Steady	Greece	14
16	Steady	Malta	14
17	▲12	Canada	13
18	▼1	Italy	11
19	▼1	Jamaica	9
20	▲7	Scotland	8
21	▲1	United States	8
22	▼3	Poland	7
23	▼3	Lebanon	7
24	▼1	Germany	7
25	▼1	Czech Republic	6
26	▼5	Norway	6
27	▼2	Chile	5
28	▲2	Philippines	5
29	▼1	South Africa	4
30	Steady	Brazil	3
31	Steady	Morocco	3
32	▲1	Argentina	3
33	▲2	Ghana	2
34	▲2	Kenya	2
35	▼1	Montenegro	2
36	▲1	Nigeria	2
37	▼5	North Macedonia	1
38	Steady	Albania	1
39	Steady	Turkey	1
40	Steady	Bulgaria	1
41	Steady	Cameroon	0
42	Steady	Japan	0
43	Steady	Spain	0
44	Steady	Colombia	0
45	Steady	Russia	0
46	Steady	El Salvador	0
47	Steady	Bosnia and Herzegovina	0
48	Steady	Hong Kong	0
49	Steady	Solomon Islands	0
50	Steady	Vanuatu	0
51	Steady	Hungary	0
52	Steady	Latvia	0
53	Steady	Denmark	0
54	Steady	Belgium	0
55	Steady	Estonia	0
56	Steady	Sweden	0
57	Steady	Niue	0
Complete rankings at www.internationalrugbyleague.com
