= Nordic Cup (rugby league) =

International rugby league competition

- Sport: Rugby league
- Instituted: 2010
- Number of teams: 3
- Country: Denmark; Sweden; Norway (RLEF)
- Holders: Norway (4th title)
- Most titles: Norway (4)

The Nordic Cup is a rugby league tournament played annually between the national rugby league teams of Denmark, Norway and Sweden. It was first played in 2010 as a single match between Norway and Sweden which resulted in a 20–20 draw. In 2011, Denmark joined the competition and claimed the trophy with victories over Norway and Sweden. For the first four years, the tournament was acknowledged by the Rugby League European Federation (RLEF), but the games were not recognised as full internationals. In 2014, the fixtures were played in accordance with RLEF regulations and recognised as full internationals.

== Nordic Cup 2017 ==
| Position | Nation | Played | Won | Drawn | Lost | Points | For | Against |
|---|---|---|---|---|---|---|---|---|
| 1 | Norway | 2 | 2 | 0 | 0 | 4 | 84 | 42 |
| 2 | Sweden | 1 | 0 | 0 | 1 | 0 | 18 | 38 |
| 3 | Denmark | 1 | 0 | 0 | 1 | 0 | 24 | 46 |

(ranking in square brackets)

Norway [#18] 38–18 Sweden #[20] (Bislett Stadion, Oslo, Norway, 17 June 2017)

Denmark [#17] 24–46 Norway [#18] (Roskilde, Denmark, 19 August 2017)

Sweden [#20] v Denmark [#17] (16 September 2017 – match postponed)

== Nordic Cup 2016 ==
Denmark was unable to fulfil its commitment in its game against Norway, so they had to forfeit the match and the title it held.

| Position | Nation | Played | Won | Drawn | Lost | Forfeit | Points | For | Against |
|---|---|---|---|---|---|---|---|---|---|
| 1 | Norway | 1 | 1 | 0 | 0 | 1 | 4 | 40 | 24 |
| 2 | Denmark | 1 | 1 | 0 | 0 | 0 | 2 | 50 | 18 |
| 3 | Sweden | 2 | 0 | 0 | 2 | – | 0 | 42 | 90 |

Sweden 24–40 Norway (Stockholm, 16 July 2016)

Denmark 50–18 Sweden (Copenhagen, 7 August 2016)

== Nordic Cup 2015 ==
The final game between Norway and Sweden in Oslo was played in October 2015, rather than the summer.

| Position | Nation | Played | Won | Drawn | Lost | Points | For | Against |
|---|---|---|---|---|---|---|---|---|
| 1 | Denmark | 2 | 2 | 0 | 0 | 4 | 54 | 28 |
| 2 | Norway | 2 | 1 | 0 | 1 | 2 | 42 | 44 |
| 3 | Sweden | 2 | 0 | 0 | 2 | 0 | 36 | 60 |

Sweden 16–30 Denmark (Lund, 24 May 2015)

Denmark 24–12 Norway (Roskilde, 13 June 2015)

Norway 30–20 Sweden (Oslo, 17 October 2015)

== Results ==
Norway have won four (2010, 2012, 2016, 2017) of the eight competitions including the inaugural year in which they tied with Sweden, Denmark have won three (2011, 2014, 2015) and Sweden two (2010, 2013).

| Season | Winner | 2nd | 3rd |
|---|---|---|---|
| 2010 | Norway; Sweden | —N/a | |
| 2011 | Denmark | Norway | Sweden |
| 2012 | Norway | Denmark | Sweden |
| 2013 | Sweden | Denmark | Norway |
| 2014 | Denmark | Sweden | Norway |
| 2015 | Denmark | Norway | Sweden |
| 2016 | Norway | Denmark | Sweden |
| 2017 | Norway | Sweden | Denmark |

=== Winners ===
| Winners | Count | Years |
|---|---|---|
| Norway | 4 | 2010 (Note: joint winner) 2012, 2016, 2017 |
| Denmark | 3 | 2011, 2014, 2015 |
| Sweden | 2 | 2010, 2013 |
