= Associació Catalana de Rugby Lliga =

Catalan Rugby League Association
- Associació Catalana de Rugby Lliga
- Founded: 2007
- RLEF affiliation: 2008–2014 (Observer)
- Responsibility: Catalonia
- Key people: Sergi Blàzquez (Chair)
- Website: rugbylliga.cat

(Catalonia)
- As of 30 June 2009

The Associació Catalana de Rugby Lliga (ACRL) (Catalan Rugby League Association) is the governing body for the sport of rugby league in Catalonia. The Association was formed in 2007 and since then has organized and governed the Catalan competitions.

Rugby league in the region of Northern Catalonia in Southern France come under the governance of the Fédération Française de Rugby à XIII.

== History ==
In 2008 the first competition was held. Three teams played in the Catalan Cup: FC Barcelona, Aligots Girona and Nord-Català.

In January 2009, a rugby league coaching course was run by ACRL and taken by RFL Coach Educator Karl Harrison to improve rugby league concepts in Catalonia.

In February 2009 the first Catalan university rugby-league championship took place, with seven universities teams participating: Perpinyà, Ramon Llull, Girona, Autònoma de Barcelona, Vic, Politècnica de Catalunya and Pompeu Fabra. Universitat de Perpinyà were the winners.

The first Catalonia Championship began in April 2009, with nine teams participating: CR Tarragona, CR Valls, CR Sant Cugat, INEF Lleida, GEiEG, Poble Nou Enginyers, BUC, RC Garrotxa and Vic Crancs.

The Catalonia national rugby league team, also administered by the ACRL, played their first full international, losing to Morocco in a game played prior to the Catalans Dragons vs Warrington Wolves Super League, on June 21, 2008.

In September 2014, Observer status of the RLEF was revoked as the association had not reported any activity since 2009.

== See also ==
- Rugby league in Spain
- Catalonia national rugby league team
- Catalan Rugby League Championship
- Rugby league in Catalonia
