= Sweden national rugby league team =

Swedish national rugby league team

Sweden

Team information
- Governing body: Sweden Rugby League
- Region: Europe
- Head coach: Sebastian Johnson-Cadwell
- Captain: Fabian Wikander
- IRL ranking: 56th

Team results
- First international
- Sweden 20 - 20 Norway (Gothenburg, Sweden; 30 October 2010)
- Biggest win
- Sweden 50 - 16 Poland (Łódź, Poland; 12 October 2019)
- Biggest defeat
- Denmark 122 - 8 Sweden (Copenhagen, Denmark; 28 April 2012)

The Sweden national rugby league team (nicknamed the Barbarians) was founded in 2008.

== History ==
Rugby League in Sweden was founded by Scott Edwards in 2008. The first competitive rugby league on Swedish soil was the 2nd annual Scandinavian Nines Tournament, hosted by Spartacus Reds in Gothenburg in April 2010. Following the success of the 9's competition, a domestic league was founded in 2011, comprising three teams - Borås Ravens, Spartacus Reds and Gothenburg Lions.

Sweden competed in their first rugby league international on 30 October 2010 when they drew 20 - 20 against Norway. Robin Larsson was the first player to score a try for Sweden.

Sweden earned their first international rugby league win in July 2013, beating Norway in the Nordic Cup 40–22 in Oslo. Later in the year, Sweden would win their first ever silverware, after they beat Denmark in August. This victory secured Sweden's first ever Nordic cup title.

== Current squad ==
22 September 2018 vs Netherlands;

- Christoffer Andreasson
- Robert Maun
- Muller Qalibu
- Christopher Vannerberg
- Jonas Lyppert
- Fabian Wikander
- Andrew Bignell
- Mark Beveridge
- Ruaidhrí O’Brien
- Peter Wiklund
- Fakaosifolau Maake
- Buster Derk
- Theo Karlsson
- Plamen Lazarov
- Johnny Engstrom
- Sebastian Johnson-Cadwell
- Mathew Mitchell

== Competitive record ==
=== Overall ===
Team	First Played	Played	Win	Draw	Loss	Points For	Points Against	Last Meeting
Czech Republic	2015	1	1	0	0	40	12	2015
Denmark	2011	6	1	0	5	104	310	2016
Netherlands	2017	2	0	0	2	28	52	2018
Norway	2010	8	2	1	5	162	244	2018
Poland	2019	1	1	0	0	50	16	2019
TOTAL		18	5	1	12	384	634	

=== Results ===
Date	Result	Competition	Venue	Attendance
12 October 2019	Sweden def. Poland 50-16	Friendly	Łódź, Poland	Not known
13 October 2018	Norway def. Sweden 46-6	Friendly	Gothenburg, Sweden	Not known
22 September 2018	Netherlands def. Sweden 24-4	Friendly	Gothenburg, Sweden	Not known
9 September 2017	Netherlands def. Sweden 28-24	Friendly	Oslo, Norway	Not known
17 June 2017	Norway def. Sweden 38-18	Nordic Cup	Oslo, Norway	Not known
7 August 2016	Norway def. Sweden 50-18	Nordic Cup	Copenhagen, Denmark	Not known
16 July 2016	Norway def. Sweden 40-24	Nordic Cup	Stockholm, Sweden	Not known
17 October 2015	Norway def. Sweden 30-20	Nordic Cup	Oslo, Norway	Not known
30 August 2014	Sweden def. Norway 24-12	Nordic Cup	Kävlinge, Sweden	Not known
16 August 2014	Denmark def. Sweden 44-6	Nordic Cup	Copenhagen, Denmark	Not known
17 August 2013	Sweden def. Denmark 38-12	Nordic Cup	Kävlinge, Sweden	Not known
24 July 2013	Sweden def. Norway 40-22	Nordic Cup	Oslo, Norway	Not known
28 July 2012	Norway def. Sweden 36-10	Nordic Cup	Stockholm, Sweden	Not known
28 April 2012	Denmark def. Sweden 122-8	Test match	Gladsaxe Stadium, Copenhagen, Denmark	500+
2 July 2011	Denmark XIII def. Sweden 52-18	Nordic Cup	Spartacus Rugby Club, Gothenburg, Sweden	Not known
30 October 2010	Sweden drew Norway 20-20	Nordic Cup	Spartacus Rugby Club, Gothenburg	Not known

== Honours ==
- Nordic Cup:
  - Champions: 2013

== IRL Rankings ==
IRL Men's World Rankings
Official rankings as of December 2025
Rank	Change	Team	Pts %
1	Steady	Australia	100
2	Steady	New Zealand	82
3	Steady	England	74
4	Steady	Samoa	56
5	Steady	Tonga	54
6	Steady	Papua New Guinea	47
7	Steady	Fiji	34
8	Steady	France	24
9	Steady	Cook Islands	24
10	Steady	Serbia	23
11	Steady	Netherlands	22
12	Steady	Ukraine	21
13	Steady	Wales	18
14	Steady	Ireland	17
15	Steady	Greece	15
16	Steady	Malta	15
17	Steady	Italy	11
18	Steady	Jamaica	9
19	▲1	Poland	7
20	▲1	Lebanon	7
21	▲1	Norway	7
22	▼3	United States	7
23	Steady	Germany	7
24	Steady	Czech Republic	6
25	Steady	Chile	6
26	▲1	Philippines	5
27	▲1	Scotland	5
28	▼2	South Africa	5
29	▲1	Canada	5
30	▼1	Brazil	3
31	▲1	Morocco	3
32	▲1	North Macedonia	3
33	▲1	Argentina	3
34	▲1	Montenegro	3
35	▲4	Ghana	2
36	▼5	Kenya	2
37	▲3	Nigeria	2
38	▼2	Albania	1
39	▼2	Turkey	1
40	▼2	Bulgaria	1
41	▲1	Cameroon	0
42	▲1	Japan	0
43	▲1	Spain	0
44	▼3	Colombia	0
45	Steady	Russia	0
46	Steady	El Salvador	0
47	Steady	Bosnia and Herzegovina	0
48	Steady	Hong Kong	0
49	Steady	Solomon Islands	0
50	Steady	Vanuatu	0
51	Steady	Hungary	0
52	Steady	Latvia	0
53	Steady	Denmark	0
54	Steady	Belgium	0
55	Steady	Estonia	0
56	Steady	Sweden	0
57	Steady	Niue	0
Complete rankings at www.internationalrugbyleague.com
