= Rugby league in Sweden =

- Country: Sweden
- Governing body: Sweden Rugby League
- National team: Sweden
- Nickname: The Kronor
- First played: 2008, Olso, Sweden

Club competitions
- Sweden Super League

Audience records
- Season: 8,562 - 2011 Sweden Super League season

The first competitive rugby league in Sweden was the 2nd annual Scandinavian Nines Tournament, hosted by Spartacus Reds in Gothenburg in April 2010. A domestic league was founded in 2011, initially comprising only three small struggling teams - Borås Ravens, Spartacus Reds and Gothenburg Lions.

Sweden competed in their first rugby league international on 30 October 2010 when they travelled over the border and drew 20 – 20 against Norway. The national team has since played 18 matches, winning five and drawing one.
