= Stuart Flanagan =

Hungary international rugby league footballer

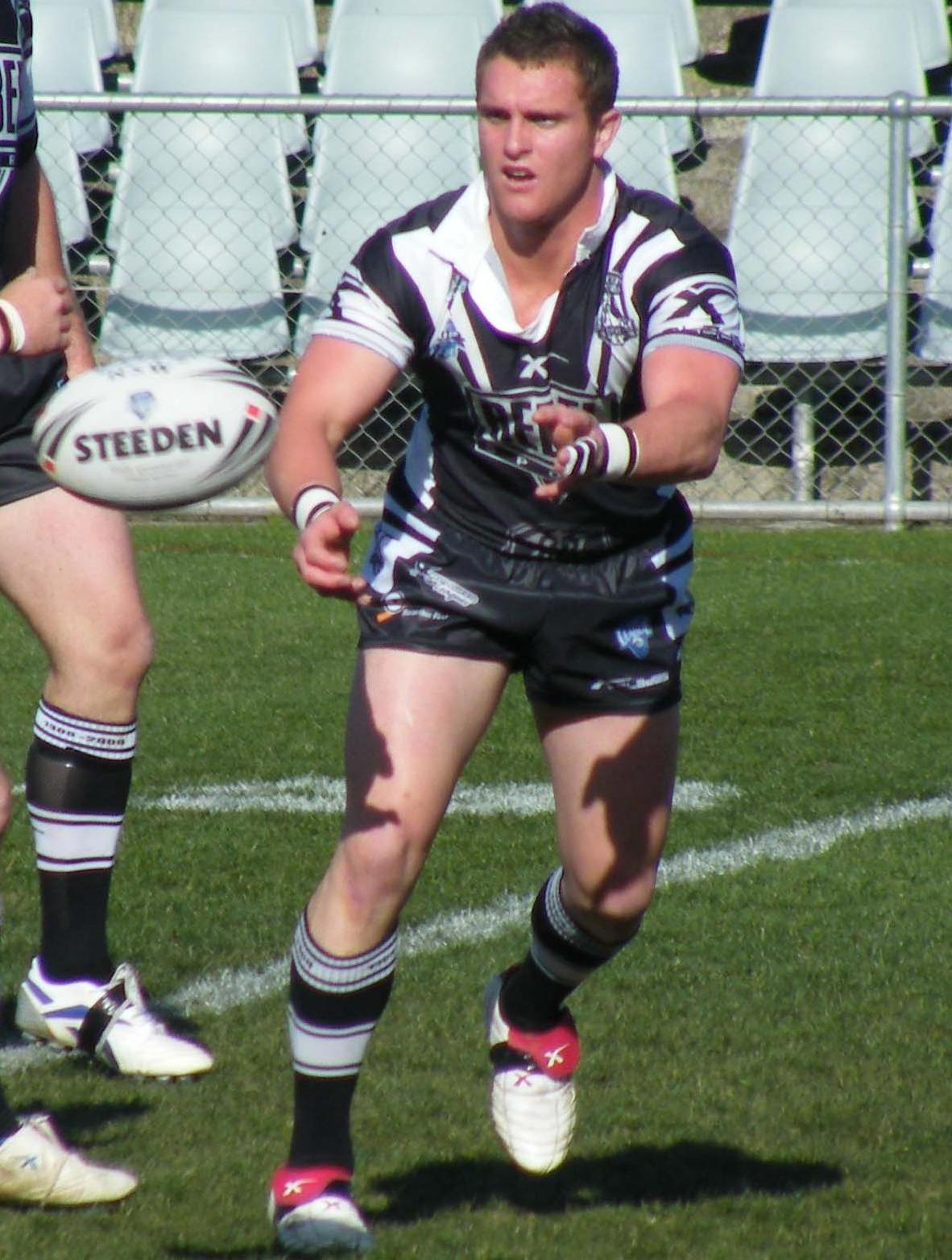

Personal information
- Full name: Stuart Jozsef Flanagan
- Born: 5 January 1987 (age 39) Cooma, New South Wales, Australia
- Height: 168 cm (5 ft 6 in)
- Weight: 113 kg (17 st 11 lb)

Playing information
- Position: Hooker
Club
| Years | Team | Pld | T | G | FG | P |
|---|---|---|---|---|---|---|
| 2006–08 | Wests Tigers | 20 | 3 | 0 | 0 | 12 |
| 2009 | Canberra Raiders | 4 | 1 | 0 | 0 | 4 |
| 2010–11 | Cronulla-Sutherland | 16 | 1 | 0 | 0 | 4 |
| | Total | 40 | 5 | 0 | 0 | 20 |
Representative
| Years | Team | Pld | T | G | FG | P |
| 2007 | NSW Residents | 1 | 1 | 0 | 0 | 4 |
| 2017–18 | Hungary | 4 | 2 | 0 | 0 | 8 |
- Source: NRL Stats As of 9 January 2024

Stuart Flanagan (born 5 January 1987 in Cooma, New South Wales, Australia) is a former Hungary international rugby league footballer who last played for the Appin Dogs and previously Cronulla Sharks in the Australian National Rugby League (NRL) competition. He primarily plays at hooker.

== Playing career ==
In 2006, Flanagan was selected to represent New South Wales under-19s as well as the Junior Kangaroos.

Flanagan also had representative honours in 2007 and 2008 when he was selected as the Hooker in the NSW Residents against Queensland.

In April 2008, Flanagan signed a three-year contract with the Canberra Raiders from the 2009 season. To this point, Flanagan had represented the Wests Tigers, but had found first grade opportunities hard to come by.

Flanagan signed a 1-year deal with the Cronulla Sharks for 2010. Flanagan re-signed with the Sharks for a further year taking him to the end of the 2011 season. Following his retirement, he was one of seventeen Sharks players found guilty of using illegal substances under the club's 2011 supplements program, having a twelve-month suspension (which had already expired due to backdating) recorded against his name.

After suspensions, Flanagan played for the Appin Dogs in the Group 6 competition. In 2017, Flanagan became an international representative when he made his debut for Hungary. He later played in the Emerging Nations Competition, both as hooker and five-eighth.
