= Denmark Rugby League Federation =

Sports governing body in Denmark

Danish Rugby League Federation
- Dansk Rugby League Forbund
- Founded: 2011
- Responsibility: Denmark
- Coach: Nigel Kitching
- Competitions: Danish Rugby League Championship

(Denmark)

The Danish Rugby League Federation is the governing body for the sport of rugby league football in Denmark and the Denmark national rugby league team, formed in November 2011 and granted observer status by the European Rugby League. They had been looking to expand the local divisions of the rugby federation and to invite British teams to Denmark. In March 2024 the federation was expelled from the International Rugby League due to inactivity.

== History ==
The website reports that there were various efforts to create a unified Danish league for rugby. It was finally created when a kit was generated by the London Skolars. The Den Glade Gris, a bar located in Copenhagen, covered the cost of transportation to Sweden. The original league consisted of expats, union converts and other people. Officially, it was created in November 2011, after the Danish Lions won the inaugural Nordic Cup competition. They also select the "Player of the Year", which their share through the news/events section of their website. However, it seems that they have stopped posting, the last "Player of the Year" was selected in 2016.

== Future goals ==
The Denmark Rugby League Federation is of the opinion that there are many opportunities for the federation today. Their Copenhagen branch was established in 2013. After another branch appeared in Jutland, they have now wanted to expand their branches. They do "Danish Origin" clashes, where the different branches of the federation all play against each other. They are also inviting British teams to tour in Denmark.
