= RLEF Euro Med Challenge =

Euro-Med Challenge
- Sport: Rugby league
- Inaugural season: 2008
- Number of teams: 3
- Region: Europe (RLEF)
- Champions: Morocco (2009)
- Website: rlef.eu.com
- Related competition: European Cup; European Shield; European Bowl

The Euro-Med Challenge is an international rugby league football competition. The competition is organized by the Rugby League European Federation and is designed to promote the sport of rugby league in Europe and the Mediterranean Region. The Euro Med Challenge is a second or third tier competition for European rugby league teams.

Because of its place as a developmental competition, it is not always contested by the same nations. In 2008, it was contested among Russia, Serbia and Lebanon. All three of these teams, however, were promoted to the European Cup in 2009, so three new teams were selected for the 2009 installment: Morocco, Belgium and Catalonia.

== 2008 ==
Russia won the 2008 tournament, which was expected to hinge on the Russia-Lebanon game. However, many of the Lebanese players could not obtain visas to travel to Russia in time for the match. This resulted in one-sided scoreline in Russia's favour and handed them the tournament.

=== Results ===
2008-09-20

Serbia	4–30	Russia
	(Report)

FK "Kabel", Novi Sad
Attendance: 500

2008-09-29

Russia	80–0	Lebanon
	(Report)

Fily Stadium, Moscow
Attendance: 2000

2008-10-05

Lebanon	20–14	Serbia
	(Report)

Municipal Stadium, Bhamdoun
Attendance: 1000

==== Standings ====
Team	Played	Won	Drew	Lost	For	Against	Difference	Points
Russia	2	2	0	0	110	4	+106	4
Lebanon	2	1	0	1	20	94	−74	2
Serbia	2	0	0	2	18	50	−32	0

== 2009 ==
In 2009, the RLEF announced that Russia, Lebanon and Serbia would be promoted to a revamped European Nations Cup. The Euro-Med Challenge was therefore contested by three new teams in 2009 – Belgium and Catalonia, who made their competitive debuts, and Morocco. Belgium recorded their first international win, beating Catalonia in game 2 of the tournament, but the experienced Moroccan team won the competition.

=== Results ===
2009-07-04

Catalonia	6–29	Morocco
Try: Pellisier; Conv: Homs	(Report)	Tries: Nhari, Nicolas, Khattabi, Kriouache, Lamarti; Conv: Lamarti (4); DG: Kriouache

Torroella de Montgrí
Attendance: 1,000

2009-07-25

Belgium	28–22	Catalonia
Tries: Outara (2), Samsam (2), Radelet, Gagnon; Conv: M. Keeble (2)	(Report)	Tries: Calvin, Petanas, Pistone (2); Conv: Homs (3)

Wavre
Attendance: 400

2009-08-15

Morocco	46–12	Belgium

Stade de la Méditerranée, Beziers
Attendance: 9,800

==== Standings ====
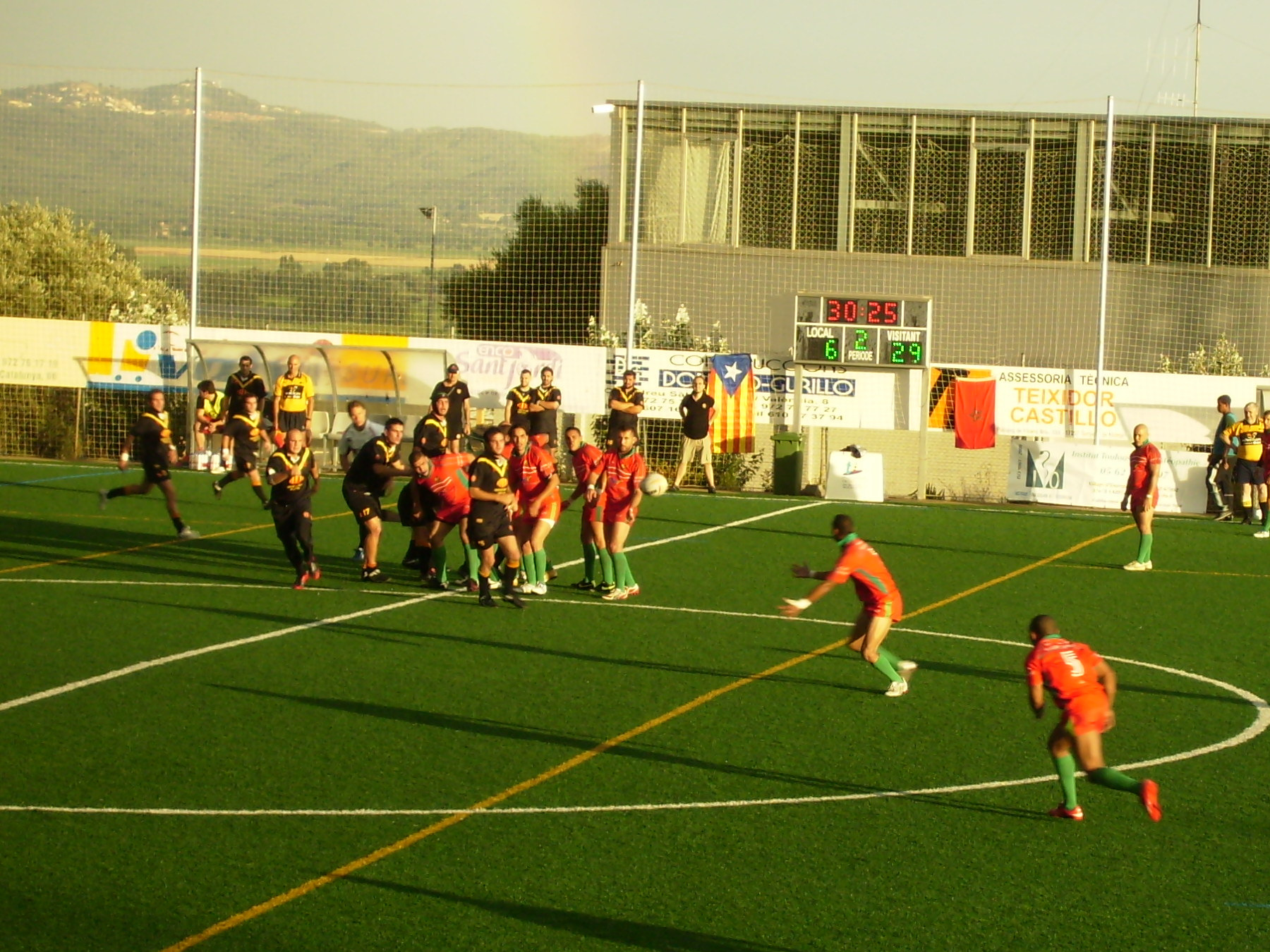
Catalonia (in black) vs Morocco (in red) in 2009

Team	Played	Won	Drew	Lost	PF	PA	Diff.	Pts
Morocco	2	2	0	0	75	18	+57	4
Belgium	2	1	0	1	40	68	−28	2
Catalonia	2	0	0	2	28	57	−29	0
