= Germany national rugby league team =

Germany

Team information
- Governing body: Rugby League Deutschland
- Region: Europe
- Head coach: Bob Doughton
- Captain: Brad Billsborough
- Most caps: Liam Doughton (24)
- Top try-scorer: Jimmy Keinhorst (17)
- Top point-scorer: Jimmy Keinhorst (98)
- IRL ranking: 24th

Uniforms
Home colours	Alternate colours

Team results
- First international
- Germany 34–32 Austria (Bad Reichenhall, Germany; 2006)
- Biggest win
- Germany 96–0 Czech Republic (Hochspeyer, Germany; 2010)
- Biggest defeat
- Germany 6-90 Serbia (Hochspeyer, Germany; 2011)

The Germany national rugby league team is the national rugby league team of Germany.

== History ==
The captain of the national side is Brad Billsborough. Bob Doughton is head coach. The most capped player is Liam Doughton who has 24 Caps.

As well as playing friendlies, the team currently competes in European Championship C. They also play against the Netherlands in the annual Griffin Cup. In October 2022, Germany won the 10th edition of the Griffin Cup, defeating the Netherlands 29-24.

In the Central Europe Development Tri-Nations in 2006 they won both of their matches narrowly beating Austria in Bad Reichenhall in front of over 350 people. They then beat Estonia in Tallinn to seal victory of the competition.

== Coaching staff ==
Coaches Name	Role	Date Appointed	Date Departed	P	W	L	D	Win%
(Germany) Uwe Jansen	Head coach	2006	2008	4	3	1	0	75%
(England) Dan Stocks	Head coach	2009	?	?	?	?	?	?
(Germany) Paul Szehofner	Assistant coach	?	?	?	?	?	?	?
(England) Simon Cooper	Head coach	?	2020	?	?	?	?	?
(England) Bob Doughton	Head coach	2020	present	2	1	1	0	50%

== 2024 squad ==
Germany 2024 Squad
First team squad		Coaching staff
Martin Apostel; Malte Breckwoldt; Liam Doughton; Dany Doukeng; Benedikt Esser; Henrik Hanswillemenke; Florian Kähler; Fabian Kramer; Linus Kurz; Korbinian Mayer; Harry Miles; Logan Mokalei; Alex Nyahoe	Matiu Peel; Felix Rau; Martin Tormann; Fabian Wikander; Aaron Willmott; Jakub Zwanski	Head coach: Bob Doughton; Legend: (c) Captain(s); (vc) Vice-captain(s); Updated: September 2024; Source(s):

== Competitive record ==
=== Overall ===
Team	Played	Win	Draw	Loss	Win %
Austria	1	1	0	0	100%
Belgium	1	0	0	1	0%
Czech Republic	5	4	0	1	80%
Estonia	1	1	0	0	100%
France	2	1	0	1	50%
Italy	5	0	1	4	0%
Italy A	1	1	0	0	100%
Malta	1	1	0	0	100%
Netherlands	11	5	0	6	45%
Norway	2	0	0	2	0%
Poland	2	2	0	0	100%
Russia	2	0	0	2	0%
Serbia	5	1	0	4	20%
Spain	1	1	0	0	100%
Wales A	2	1	0	1	50%
England A	1	0	0	1	0%
Total	43	19	1	23	44%

=== European Championship B ===
Since 2007, Germany has been a participant in the European Shield, the successor to the Central Europe Tri-Nations. In the 2007 Shield, they were beaten in Heidelberg by a strong Serbia side but beat the Czech Republic in Prague, subsequently finishing second.

In the 2008 European Shield, Germany again defeated the Czech team. However, they lost to the subsequent champions Italy and again took second for the tournament.

The 2009 European Shield featured the same three sides as in 2008. The first match of the tournament saw Germany lose to the Czech Republic 30–4 in Olomouc. That game marked the first international victory for the Czech team.

In the 2010 European Shield, Germany lost to the subsequent group winners Serbia and defeated the Czech team, finishing in the second place.

European Championship B Record
Year	Round	Position	Pld	Win	Draw	Loss
2006	Champions	1/3	2	2	0	0
2007	Second Place	2/3	2	1	0	1
2008	Second Place	2/3	2	1	0	1
2009	Third Place	3/3	2	0	0	2
2010	Second Place	2/3	2	1	0	1
2011	Champions	1/3	2	1	0	1
2012-13	Fourth Place	4/4	6	1	0	5
2014-15	Not invited					
2018	Not invited					

=== European Championship C ===
European Championship C Record
Year	Round	Position	Pld	Win	Draw	Loss
2008	Not invited					
2009	Not invited					
2010	Not invited					
2011	Not invited					
2012	Not invited					
2013	Not invited					
2014	Not invited					
2015	Not invited					
2016	Not invited					
2018-19	Not invited					
2020	Qualified					

=== Results ===
Date	Home	Score	Away	Competition	Venue	Attendance
25 June 2006	Germany	34–32	Austria	2006 Euro B	Nonner Stadion, Bad Reichenhall	358
22 July 2006	Germany	24–38	Estonia	2006 Euro B	Viimsi Stadium, Tallinn	548
7 July 2007	Germany	6–38	Serbia	2007 Euro B	Heidelberg, Germany	Not known
4 August 2007	Czech Republic	22–44	Germany	2007 Euro B	Slavia Prague, Prague, Czech Republic	Not known
13 June 2008	Italy	58–26	Germany	2008 Euro B	Stadio Communale del Plebiscito, Padova, Italy	Not known
3 August 2008	Germany	62–20	Czech Republic	2008 Euro B	Karlsruhe, Germany	Not known
4 July 2009	Czech Republic	30–4	Germany	2009 Euro B	Lokomotiva Olomouc, Olomouc, Czech Republic	Not known
18 July 2009	Germany	30–42	Italy	2009 Euro B	Heurth Stadion, Cologne, Germany	Not known
3 July 2010	Serbia	40–14	Germany	2010 Euro B West Division	FC Radnicki, Belgrade, Serbia	Not known
17 July 2010	Germany	96–0	Czech Republic	2010 Euro B West Division	Hochspeyer, Kaiserslautern, Germany	350 approx
22 April 2011	Germany	6–90	Serbia	Friendly	Hochspeyer, Kaiserslautern, Germany	Not known
9 July 2011	Norway	32–28	Germany	2011 Euro B	Bislett Stadion, Oslo, Norway	Not known
23 July 2011	Germany	36–12	Malta	2011 Euro B	Hochspeyer, Kaiserslautern, Germany	300 approx
12 May 2012	Germany	25–24	Serbia	2012–13 Euro B	Heidelberg, Germany	Not Known
7 July 2012	Russia	72–10	Germany	2012–13 Euro B	Stadio Beltrametti, Piacenza	Not Known
19 May 2012	Germany	26–32	Italy	2012–13 Euro B	Heidelberg, Germany	Not Known
4 May 2013	Germany	28–22	Netherlands	2013 Griffin Cup	Heidelberg, Germany	Not Known
18 May 2013	Serbia	46–10	Germany	2012–13 Euro B	Makiš Stadium, Belgrade, Serbia	Not Known
27 July 2013	Germany	30–66	Italy	2012–13 Euro B	Nordstern Stadion, Karlsruhe	Not Known
10 August 2013	Germany	0–30	Russia	2012–13 Euro B		Not Known
3 May 2014	Netherlands	16-70	Germany	2014 Griffin Cup	Delft, Netherlands	Not Known
20 June 2015	Germany	46-12	Netherlands	2015 Griffin Cup	Not known	Not Known
August 2016	Germany	26-12	Belgium	Friendly	Dortmund	Not Known
13 August 2016	Netherlands	6-8	Germany	2016 Griffin Cup	Rotterdam	Not Known
October 2016	Wales A	40-32	Germany	Friendly	Not known	Not Known
26 August 2017	Germany	18-30	Netherlands	2017 Griffin Cup	Osnabrück	Not Known
October 2017	Wales A	34-38	Germany	Friendly	Not known	Not Known
25 August 2018	Germany	24-4	Czech Republic	2018–19 Euro C	Osnabrück	Not Known
1 September 2018	Netherlands	38-22	Germany	2018 Griffin Cup	Rotterdam	Not Known
15 September 2018	Norway	22-40	Germany	2018–19 Euro C	Porsgrunn	Not Known
August 2019	England A	24-18	Germany	Friendly	Leigh Miners Rangers	Not Known
September 2019	Germany	18-56	Netherlands	2019 Griffin Cup	Gnarrenburg	Not Known
October 2019	Italy A	6-26	Germany	Friendly	Lignano Sabbiadoro	Not Known
26 September 2020	Netherlands	20-18	Germany	2020 Griffin Cup	Zwolle	Not Known
2 October 2021	Germany	16-48	Netherlands	2021 Griffin Cup	Düsseldorf	Not Known
8 October 2022	Netherlands	24-29	Germany	2022 Griffin Cup	Voorschoten	500
21 October 2023	Germany	18-44	Netherlands	2023 Griffin Cup	Hattingen	Not Known
November 2023	Germany	54-10	Poland	Friendly	Berlin	Not Known
September 2024	Poland	18-58	Germany	Friendly	Nowe Skalmierzyce	Not Known
18 October 2025	Czech Republic	10-72	Germany	2025 Euro D	Stadion HZS, Hradec Králové	
25 October 2025	Germany	32-18	Norway	2025 Euro D	Sportplatz Welper, Hattingen	
12 September 2026	Netherlands	14-28	Germany	2026 Griffin Cup	Zaandijk Rugby Club, Zaandam	
3 October 2026	Germany	28-29	Malta	2026 Euro C	Sportsplatz Welper, Hattingen	
17 October 2026	Greece	68-14	Germany	2026 Euro C	Elena Venizelou Stadium, Chania	

== IRL Rankings ==
IRL Men's World Rankings
Official rankings as of August 2026
Rank	Change	Team	Pts %
1	Steady	Australia	100
2	Steady	New Zealand	82
3	Steady	England	70
4	Steady	Samoa	56
5	Steady	Tonga	54
6	Steady	Papua New Guinea	47
7	Steady	Fiji	34
8	▲1	Cook Islands	24
9	▲2	Netherlands	23
10	▲2	Ukraine	21
11	▼3	France	21
12	▼2	Serbia	20
13	Steady	Wales	18
14	Steady	Ireland	17
15	Steady	Greece	14
16	Steady	Malta	14
17	▲12	Canada	13
18	▼1	Italy	11
19	▼1	Jamaica	9
20	▲7	Scotland	8
21	▲1	United States	8
22	▼3	Poland	7
23	▼3	Lebanon	7
24	▼1	Germany	7
25	▼1	Czech Republic	6
26	▼5	Norway	6
27	▼2	Chile	5
28	▲2	Philippines	5
29	▼1	South Africa	4
30	Steady	Brazil	3
31	Steady	Morocco	3
32	▲1	Argentina	3
33	▲2	Ghana	2
34	▲2	Kenya	2
35	▼1	Montenegro	2
36	▲1	Nigeria	2
37	▼5	North Macedonia	1
38	Steady	Albania	1
39	Steady	Turkey	1
40	Steady	Bulgaria	1
41	Steady	Cameroon	0
42	Steady	Japan	0
43	Steady	Spain	0
44	Steady	Colombia	0
45	Steady	Russia	0
46	Steady	El Salvador	0
47	Steady	Bosnia and Herzegovina	0
48	Steady	Hong Kong	0
49	Steady	Solomon Islands	0
50	Steady	Vanuatu	0
51	Steady	Hungary	0
52	Steady	Latvia	0
53	Steady	Denmark	0
54	Steady	Belgium	0
55	Steady	Estonia	0
56	Steady	Sweden	0
57	Steady	Niue	0
Complete rankings at www.internationalrugbyleague.com

== See also ==
- Rugby league in Germany
