= 2008 Rugby League European Bowl =

2008 European Bowl
- Number of teams: 2
- Winner: Latvia (1st title)
- Matches played: 2

The 2008 European Cup, an international rugby league competition, had a major setback with Ukraine forfeiting their fixtures due to issues with their team's visas. The tournament was won by Latvia, who defeated Estonia with an aggregate score of 110–20.

28 June 2008

Estonia	10–48	Latvia
	(Report)

Le Coq Arena, Tallinn

3 August 2008

Latvia	62–10	Estonia
	(Report)

Upezhtsiems Stadium, Riga
