= 2011 Rugby League European Bowl =

Sport Event

2011 European Bowl
- Number of teams: 2
- Winner: Czech Republic (1st title)
- Matches played: 1

The 2011 European Bowl comprised a single match. Czech Republic and Hungary (Magyar Bulls RLFC) both made their debuts in the Bowl competition.

23 July 2011

Hungary	16–38	Czech Republic
Tries: Torrance, Bihari L., Angel; Conv: Torrance (2)	(Report)	Tries: Mulhall, Leeuw (3), Buben (2), Sedina; Conv: Buben (4) Mulhall (1)

Széktói Stadion, Kecskemét
