= Norway national rugby league team =

Norway

Team information
- Nickname: The Vikings
- Governing body: The Norwegian Rugby Federation
- Region: Europe
- Head coach: Isaac R Schmidt
- Captain: Kristoffer Milligan
- IRL ranking: 26th

Team results
- First game
- Norway 0-24 GB Pioneers (United Kingdom) (Oslo, Norway; 4 July 2009)
- Biggest win
- Norway 86-6 Czech Republic (Strømmen Stadion, Strømmen, Norway; 11 October 2025)
- Biggest defeat
- Denmark 60-10 Norway (Gladsaxe Stadium, Copenhagen, Denmark; 17 August 2013) Norway 6-56 Canada (Vigernesjordet, Lillestrøm, Norway; 2 July 2026)

The Norway national rugby league team was founded in 2008. Rugby League in Norway is played through junior and amateur level. There is a small seven-team premier competition and several development cups. They are recognized by the Norwegian Rugby Federation and the Rugby League International Federation as having affiliate status.

== History ==
In February 2008, Norway was granted official observer status by the Rugby League European Federation despite being unranked at that point. This was not the only major point of development in the year, as a committee was formed, based in capital city Oslo, with the aim of developing the game all over the country.

Norway's maiden Rugby League event was the "Scandinavia Cup", which was held in Oslo, Norway between 30 and 31 May 2009 and played under 9's rules. Norway played Great Britain Pioneers in their first representative match on 5 July 2009 in Oslo which the visitors won 24–0. Norway played their first international on 22 August 2009, against Denmark in Copenhagen and won 28–26.

== Competitive record ==
=== Overall ===
Team	First Played	Played	Win	Draw	Loss	Points For	Points Against	Last Meeting
Canada	2026	1	0	0	1	6	56	2026
Czech Republic	2013	5	3	0	2	160	78	2025
Denmark	2009	6	2	0	4	122	158	2017
Germany	2011	2	2	0	0	72	50	2018
Greece	2019	3	0	0	3	58	126	2024
Malta	2010	2	0	0	2	44	94	2011
Netherlands	2023	1	0	0	1	22	58	2023
Poland	2018	3	2	0	1	162	22	2022
Sweden	2010	8	5	1	2	244	162	2018
Ukraine	2013	1	0	0	1	14	42	2013
TOTAL		32	15	1	17	904	846	2026

=== Results ===
Date	Home	Score	Away	Competition	Location	Attendance
22 August 2009	Denmark	26–28	Norway	Friendly	Copenhagen, Denmark	Unknown
4 June 2010	Malta	30–20	Norway	2010 European Bowl	Hamrun, Malta	Unknown
30 October 2010	Sweden	20–20	Norway	2010 Nordic Cup	Stockholm, Sweden	Unknown
9 July 2011	Norway	32–28	Germany	2011 European Shield	Oslo, Norway	Unknown
2 September 2011	Malta	64–24	Norway	2011 European Shield	St Julians, Malta	Unknown
2 October 2011	Denmark	28–8	Norway	2011 Nordic Cup	Copenhagen, Denmark	486
28 July 2012	Sweden	10–36	Norway	2012 Nordic Cup	Stockholm, Sweden	Unknown
4 August 2012	Norway	36–6	Denmark	2012 Nordic Cup	Oslo, Norway	Unknown
6 July 2013	Ukraine	42–12	Norway	2013 European Bowl	Kharkiv, Ukraine	Unknown
13 July 2013	Norway	26–14	Czech Republic	2013 European Bowl	Oslo, Norway	Unknown
20 July 2013	Norway	22–40	Sweden	2013 Nordic Cup	Oslo, Norway	Unknown
17 August 2013	Denmark	60–10	Norway	2013 Nordic Cup	Copenhagen, Denmark	Unknown
28 June 2014	Norway	10–16	Denmark	2014 Nordic Cup	Oslo, Norway	Unknown
28 August 2014	Sweden	24–12	Norway	2014 Nordic Cup	Stockholm, Sweden	Unknown
13 June 2015	Denmark	24–12	Norway	2015 Nordic Cup	Copenhagen, Denmark	Unknown
17 October 2015	Norway	30–20	Sweden	2015 Nordic Cup	Oslo, Norway	Unknown
16 July 2016	Sweden	24–40	Norway	2016 Nordic Cup	Stockholm, Sweden	Unknown
24 September 2017	Czech Republic	12–6	Norway	Friendly	Krupka, Czech Republic	Unknown
17 June 2017	Norway	38–18	Sweden	Friendly	Oslo, Norway	Unknown
19 August 2017	Denmark	24-46	Norway	Friendly	Copenhagen, Denmark	Unknown
21 October 2017	Czech Republic	26–30	Norway	Friendly	Krupka, Czech Republic	Unknown
16 June 2018	Czech Republic	20–12	Norway	Friendly	Prague, Czech Republic	1,000
1 September 2018	Norway	76–0	Poland	Friendly	Stavanger, Norway	Unknown
15 September 2018	Norway	40–22	Germany	Friendly	Porsgrunn, Norway	562
13 October 2018	Sweden	6–46	Norway	Friendly	Gothenburg, Sweden	Unknown
18 May 2019	Greece	56–26	Norway	Friendly	White Hart Lane Community Sports Centre, London, UK	300
19 October 2019	Poland	0–68	Norway	Friendly	Łódź, Poland	Unknown
12 November 2022	Poland	22–18	Norway	Friendly	Wanderers Sports Ground, Ilford, UK	Unknown
30 September 2023	Netherlands	58–22	Norway	Friendly	Sassenheim, Netherlands	Unknown
4 November 2023	Norway	6–36	Greece	Friendly	Sandnes, Norway	Unknown
25 May 2024	Greece	34–26	Norway	Friendly	Athens, Greece	Unknown
11 October 2025	Norway	86–6	Czech Republic	2025 Euro D	Strømmen Stadion, Oslo, Norway	Unknown
25 October 2025	Germany	32–18	Norway	2025 Euro D	Sportplatz Welper, Hattingen, Germany	Unknown
2 July 2026	Norway	6–56	Canada	Friendly	Vigernesjordet, Lillestrøm, Norway	Unknown
17 October 2026	Norway	6–40	Italy	2026 Euro D	Øster Hus Arena, Sandnes, Norway	Unknown
31 October 2026	Czech Republic	68–26	Norway	2026 Euro D	Stadion HZS, Hradec Kralove	Unknown

== IRL Rankings ==
IRL Men's World Rankings
Official rankings as of August 2026
Rank	Change	Team	Pts %
1	Steady	Australia	100
2	Steady	New Zealand	82
3	Steady	England	70
4	Steady	Samoa	56
5	Steady	Tonga	54
6	Steady	Papua New Guinea	47
7	Steady	Fiji	34
8	▲1	Cook Islands	24
9	▲2	Netherlands	23
10	▲2	Ukraine	21
11	▼3	France	21
12	▼2	Serbia	20
13	Steady	Wales	18
14	Steady	Ireland	17
15	Steady	Greece	14
16	Steady	Malta	14
17	▲12	Canada	13
18	▼1	Italy	11
19	▼1	Jamaica	9
20	▲7	Scotland	8
21	▲1	United States	8
22	▼3	Poland	7
23	▼3	Lebanon	7
24	▼1	Germany	7
25	▼1	Czech Republic	6
26	▼5	Norway	6
27	▼2	Chile	5
28	▲2	Philippines	5
29	▼1	South Africa	4
30	Steady	Brazil	3
31	Steady	Morocco	3
32	▲1	Argentina	3
33	▲2	Ghana	2
34	▲2	Kenya	2
35	▼1	Montenegro	2
36	▲1	Nigeria	2
37	▼5	North Macedonia	1
38	Steady	Albania	1
39	Steady	Turkey	1
40	Steady	Bulgaria	1
41	Steady	Cameroon	0
42	Steady	Japan	0
43	Steady	Spain	0
44	Steady	Colombia	0
45	Steady	Russia	0
46	Steady	El Salvador	0
47	Steady	Bosnia and Herzegovina	0
48	Steady	Hong Kong	0
49	Steady	Solomon Islands	0
50	Steady	Vanuatu	0
51	Steady	Hungary	0
52	Steady	Latvia	0
53	Steady	Denmark	0
54	Steady	Belgium	0
55	Steady	Estonia	0
56	Steady	Sweden	0
57	Steady	Niue	0
Complete rankings at www.internationalrugbyleague.com
