= 2012 Rugby League European Bowl =

2012 European Bowl
- Number of teams: 2
- Winner: Czech Republic (2nd title)
- Matches played: 1

The 2012 European Bowl again comprised a single match. Czech Republic and Hungary (Magyar Bulls RLFC).

14 July 2012

Czech Republic	42–16	Hungary
	(Report)

, Vrchlabí
