= Rugby league in Estonia =

Rugby league is a team sport emerging in Estonia.

== The National Team ==
The first international was played on Estonian soil on 20 August 2005, when a Student Rugby League Chairmans Select XIII team consisting of 5 players each from England, Scotland, Wales and Ireland, played the Estonian national side, drawn from the capital Tallinn and the university city Tartu. This first match saw the national side impress to a 36-70 eventual defeat.

== See also ==
- Estonia Rugby League Federation
- Estonia national rugby league team
