= Norway Rugby League =

Rugby governing body in Norway

- Rugby League Norge
- Founded: 9 June 2009
- Responsibility: Norway
- Website: www.rugbyleague.no

(Norway)

The Norwegian Rugby Federation - Rugby League is the governing body for the sport of rugby league football in Norway.

== See also ==
- Rugby league in Norway
- Norway national rugby league team
