= Estonian Rugby League Federation =

Sports governing body in Estonia

Estonia Rugby League Federation
- Founded: 1999
- Ceased: 2012
- Responsibility: Estonia

(Estonia)

The Estonia Rugby League Federation was the governing body for the sport of rugby league football in Estonia. The Association was formed during 1999 and dissolved in 2012.

== See also ==
- Rugby league in Estonia
- Estonia national rugby league team
