= Latvia Rugby League =

- Latvijas Regbija Līgas federācija
- Founded: 26 May 2009
- Responsibility: Latvia

(Latvia)

The Latvia Rugby League Federation (Latvian: Latvijas Regbija Līgas federācija, LRL) is the governing body for the sport of rugby league football in Latvia. The Association was formed in 2009. In March 2024, they were expelled from the IRL due to inactivity. The federation manages the Latvia national rugby league team.

== See also ==
- Latvia national rugby league team
