= Estonia national rugby league team =

Estonia

Team information
- Governing body: Estonia Rugby League (2026–); Estonian Rugby League Federation (c. 2005–2012)
- Region: Europe
- IRL ranking: 55th

Uniforms
First colours

Team results
- First international
- Germany 38 – 24 Estonia (Tallinn, Estonia; 22 July 2006)
- Biggest defeat
- Ukraine 86 – 0 Estonia (Riga, Latvia; 26 July 2009)

The Estonia national rugby league team represents Estonia in the sport of rugby league football. Estonia started competing in international rugby league in 2005. They have competed in several tournaments, including the Central Europe Development Tri-Nations and the European Bowl.

The team was originally administered by the Estonian Rugby League Federation before this became inactive and was dissolved in 2012. In 2026, a new governing body, Estonia Rugby League, was established.

== Results ==
Date	Opponent	Score	Competition	Venue	Reports
22 July 2006	Germany	24–38	2006 Central Europe Development Tri-Nations	(Estonia) Tallinn	
2 September 2006	Austria	32–56	2006 Central Europe Development Tri-Nations	Paternion Stadium, Austria	
21 October 2007	Latvia	38–54	International	(Estonia) Lilleküla Stadium, Tallinn	
28 June 2008	Latvia	10–48	2008 European Bowl	(Estonia) Le Coq Arena, Tallinn	
3 August 2008	Latvia	10–62	2008 European Bowl	(Latvia) Upezhtsiems Stadium, Riga	
26 July 2009	Ukraine	0–86	2009 European Bowl	(Latvia) Upezhtsiems Stadium, Riga	
8 August 2009	Latvia	4–74	2009 European Bowl	(Estonia) Le Coq Arena, Tallinn	

== IRL Rankings ==
IRL Men's World Rankings
Official rankings as of August 2026
Rank	Change	Team	Pts %
1	Steady	Australia	100
2	Steady	New Zealand	82
3	Steady	Tonga	70
4	Steady	Samoa	56
5	Steady	England	54
6	Steady	Papua New Guinea	47
7	Steady	Fiji	34
8	▲1	Cook Islands	24
9	▲2	Netherlands	23
10	▲2	Ukraine	21
11	▼3	France	21
12	▼2	Serbia	20
13	Steady	Wales	18
14	Steady	Ireland	17
15	Steady	Greece	14
16	Steady	Malta	14
17	▲12	Canada	13
18	▼1	Italy	11
19	▼1	Jamaica	9
20	▲7	Scotland	8
21	▲1	United States	8
22	▼3	Poland	7
23	▼3	Lebanon	7
24	▼1	Germany	7
25	▼1	Czech Republic	6
26	▼5	Norway	6
27	▼2	Chile	5
28	▲2	Philippines	5
29	▼1	South Africa	4
30	Steady	Brazil	3
31	Steady	Morocco	3
32	▲1	Argentina	3
33	▲2	Ghana	2
34	▲2	Kenya	2
35	▼1	Montenegro	2
36	▲1	Nigeria	2
37	▼5	North Macedonia	1
38	Steady	Albania	1
39	Steady	Turkey	1
40	Steady	Bulgaria	1
41	Steady	Cameroon	0
42	Steady	Japan	0
43	Steady	Spain	0
44	Steady	Colombia	0
45	Steady	Russia	0
46	Steady	El Salvador	0
47	Steady	Bosnia and Herzegovina	0
48	Steady	Hong Kong	0
49	Steady	Solomon Islands	0
50	Steady	Vanuatu	0
51	Steady	Hungary	0
52	Steady	Latvia	0
53	Steady	Denmark	0
54	Steady	Belgium	0
55	Steady	Estonia	0
56	Steady	Sweden	0
57	Steady	Niue	0
Complete rankings at www.internationalrugbyleague.com

== See also ==
- Rugby league in Estonia
- Estonia Rugby League Federation
