= Catalan Rugby League Championship =

- Sport: Rugby league
- Founded: 2009
- No. of teams: 9
- Country: Catalonia [Spain]
- Most recent champion: BUC (2nd title)

The Catalan Rugby League Championship (Catalan: Campionat de Catalunya de Rugby Lliga) is the rugby league competition for clubs in Catalonia, promoted by the Catalan Rugby League Association (ACRL) and played since 2009.

== 2010 Catalan Rugby League Championship ==
=== Group 1 ===
	Pts	P	W	D	L	PF	PA	DP
BUC	6	3	3	0	0	92	16	+76
CE INEF Lleida	4	3	2	0	1	142	46	+96
CR Valls-Reus	2	3	1	0	2	14	80	-66
CR Cornellà	0	3	0	0	3	14	120	-106

May 2	CR Valls-Reus	8-74	CE INEF Lleida
May 9	CR Valls-Reus	6-0	CR Cornellà
May 19	BUC	58-4	CR Cornellà
May 29	CR Cornellà	10-56	CE INEF Lleida
June 6	CE INEF Lleida	12-28	BUC
June 9	BUC	6-0	CR Valls-Reus

=== Group 2 ===
	Pts	P	W	D	L	PF	PA	DP
CR Sant Cugat	2	2	1	0	1	64	56	+8
FC Barcelona	2	2	1	0	1	64	60	+4
GEiEG	2	2	1	0	1	66	78	-12

May 9	CR Sant Cugat	30-20	FC Barcelona
May 15	FC Barcelona	44-30	GEiEG
June 5	GEiEG	36-34	CR Sant Cugat

=== 3rd and 4th places ===
June 13 - 11:00
June 13 - 11:00	CE INEF Lleida	36-30	FC Barcelona	Camp de La Foixarda (Barcelona)

=== Final ===
June 13 - 13.00
June 13 - 13.00	BUC	44-18	CR Sant Cugat	Camp de La Foixarda (Barcelona)

Champions 2010
BARCELONA UNIVERSITARI CLUB (BUC)

== 2009 Catalan Rugby League Championship ==
=== Group 1 ===
	Pts	P	W	D	L	PF	PA	DP
CR Sant Cugat	6	3	3	0	0	164	14	+150
CE INEF Lleida	4	3	2	0	1	144	16	+128
CR Tarragona	2	3	1	0	2	52	120	-68
CR Valls	0	3	0	0	3	26	236	-210

April 18	CR Tarragona	32-22	CR Valls
May 9	CR Tarragona	14-36	CR Sant Cugat
May 16	CR Sant Cugat	6-0	CE INEF Lleida
May 24	CR Valls	4-82	CE INEF Lleida
May 30	CE INEF Lleida	62-6	CR Tarragona
May 31	CR Valls	0-122	CR Sant Cugat

=== Group 2 ===
	Pts	P	W	D	L	PF	PA	DP
BUC	8	4	4	0	0	188	84	+104
GEiEG	6	4	3	0	1	184	92	+92
PN Enginyers	2	4	1	0	3	72	106	-34
Garrotxa RC	2	4	1	0	3	102	152	-50
CA Vic Crancs	2	4	1	0	3	38	150	-112

April 18	GEiEG	62-6	CA Vic Crancs
April 18	Garrotxa RC	14-36	PN Enginyers
April 25	PN Enginyers	14-44	GEIEG
April 26	CA Vic Crancs	20-28	Garrotxa RC
April 29	PN Enginyers	22-42	BUC
May 9	Garrotxa RC	24-50	BUC
May 16	BUC	36-32	GEiEG
May 23	GEiEG	46-36	Garrotxa RC
May 23	BUC	60-6	CA Vic Crancs
May 30	CA Vic Crancs	6-0	PN Enginyers

=== 3rd and 4th places ===
June 7–11:00
June 7–11:00	CE INEF Lleida	56-23	GEiEG	Cornellà

=== Final ===
June 7–12:45
June 7–12:45	CR Sant Cugat	26-38	BUC	Cornellà

Champions 2009
BARCELONA UNIVERSITARI CLUB (BUC)

== Clubs ==
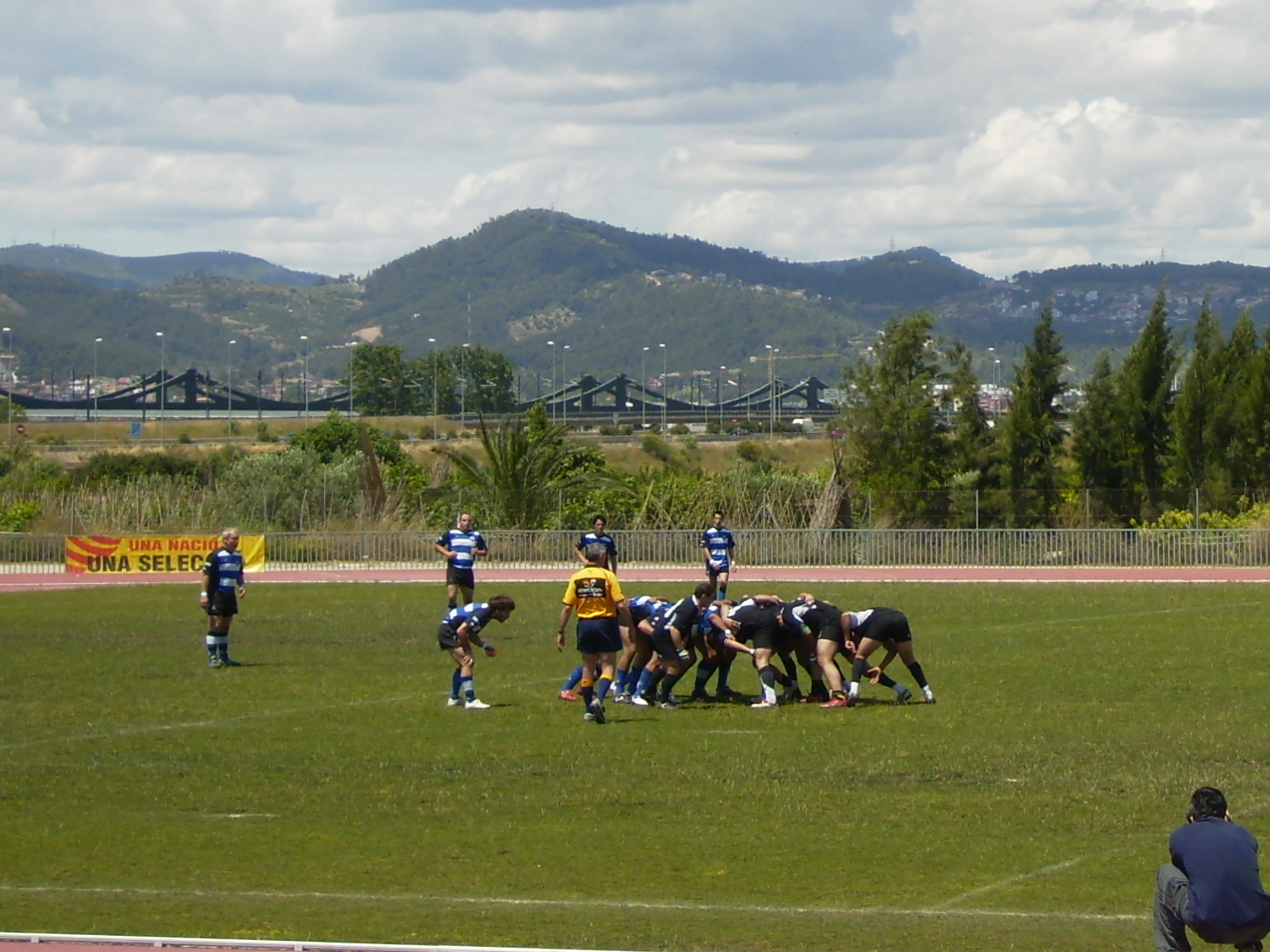
2009 Catalonia rugby league championship final. BUC vs Sant Cugat

- Club de Rugby Tarragona
- Club de Rugby Sant Cugat
- Garrotxa Rugbi Club
- Club Natació Poble Nou - Enginyers
- CE INEF Lleida
- Club Atlètic Vic - Crancs
- Club Rugby Valls
- GEIEG
- Barcelona Universitari Club

== Past winners ==
- 2009 Barcelona Universitari Club
- 2010 Barcelona Universitari Club

== See also ==
- List of rugby league competitions
