= European Rugby League =

Rugby league governing body

- Abbreviation: ERL
- Formation: 1 January 2003; 23 years ago
- Type: Sports Confederation
- Headquarters: Manchester, England
- Region served: Europe (primary); North America, Africa, Middle East (via sub-branches)
- Members: 7 Full, 19 Affiliate, 16 Observer
- Official language: English, French
- Chairman: Dean Andrew OBE
- General Manager: David Butler
- Parent organization: International Rugby League
- Website: www.europeanrugbyleague.com

The European Rugby League (ERL) (previously Rugby League European Federation (RLEF)) is the umbrella body for nations playing the sport of rugby league football across Europe. In the absence of other continental federations, ERL also controls rugby league in North America the Middle East and Africa through its sub-branches Americas Rugby League and Middle East-Africa Rugby League.

== History ==
The federation was founded January 2003 following an initiative between Richard Lewis, Executive Chairman of Great Britain's Rugby Football League (RFL) and his French counterpart Jean Paul Ferre of the French Rugby League Federation (FFR). The RLEF's first constitution was approved in January 2004 and the federation's first Board of Directors was elected. This first Board of Directors consisted of Jean Paul Ferre as Chairman and Richard Lewis as Deputy Chairman, with Nigel Wood and Nicolas Larrat being the other Board members. Representatives for Morocco, Italy, Serbia, Russia, Lebanon, Ireland, Scotland, and Wales attended. Russia became a full member of the RLEF, joining Britain and France, and the RLIF soon after.

At the time of its foundation, the RLEF placed a "particular emphasis on generating development funding within each country". Historically, much of the development work conducted in Europe had been funded by the RFL. Following the profitable 2008 World Cup, the RFL and RLEF prepared to bid for funds to enhance their activities.

2004 saw the revival of the Rugby League European Championship, now ran by the RLEF.

In December 2009, Kevin Rudd, a former Scotland rugby league international, stepped down as Executive Officer of the RLEF after more than five years in the post. RLEF Chairman Richard Lewis stated that Rudd "has done an outstanding job and created a platform, structure and competitions framework that can take us into the future". Rudd was succeeded by Danny Kazandjian. Kazandjian had previously been a key figure in the establishment of rugby league in Lebanon and had led the RLEF's development drive in the Mediterranean and Middle East regions as Director of Development for the Euro-Med region.

In 2011, the RLEF introduced two sub-branches – Americas Rugby League and Middle East-Africa Rugby League – to further develop rugby league in those regions.

In 2021, The RLEF was renamed to the European Rugby League in line with the RLIF's renaming to the International Rugby League.

After the 2022 Russian invasion of Ukraine, the European Rugby League banned Russia from all international rugby league competitions.

== Competitions ==
Competitions	Champion	Title
European Championship	France (2018)	8th
European Championship B	Serbia (2021)	4th
European Championship C	Greece (2019)	2nd
European Championship D	Netherlands (2021)	1st
Under-19 European Championship	England (2024)	2nd
Balkans Cup	Serbia (2017)	2nd
Nordic Cup	Norway (2017)	3rd
Americas Championship	Jamaica (2018)	1st
MEA Championship	Nigeria (2022)	2nd

== ERL board ==
As of 6 January 2025

Member	Representation	Nationality
Dean Andrew (Chairman)	Independent Directors	England
Tatiana Doncaster	Independent Directors	England
Brian Juliff	Member Elected Director	Wales
Jim Reynolds	Member Elected Director	Ireland
Ileana Iacopetti	Member Elected Director	Italy
Alison O'Brien	RFL Appointed Director	England
Gilles Dumas	FFRXIII Appointed Director	France

== Membership ==
Currently seven nations are full members of the federation; there are also nineteen affiliate members and sixteen official observers. Full members are entitled to a greater proportion of voting rights and to become members of the Rugby League International Federation.

In order to become an associate member, a nation must meet the following criteria:

- Implementation of a constitution and rules that commit the governing body to acting in the best interest of rugby league, throughout the whole of their country.
- Production of an annual financial report.
- Running a league competition with at least four teams.
- Implementation of a junior development programme.
- The production of a Business Development Plan outlining an organisation's future aims, including aims to find part funding for staff positions.
- A communications strategy.
- An administrators, match officials and coach education strategy.

The ERL stipulates that continued associate and full membership of the federation is subject to a check every two years to ensure that the minimum criteria are still being met.

=== Full members ===
Association	National teams			Founded	Affiliation	
Association	Men	Women	Wheelchair	Founded	IRL	ERL
(England) Rugby Football League	England	England	England	1895	1948	2003
(France) Fédération Française de Rugby à XIII	France	France	France	1934	1948	2003
Jamaica Rugby League Association	Jamaica	Jamaica	–	2004	2013	2004
(Serbia) Serbian Rugby League	Serbia	Serbia	–	2004	2012	2004
(South Africa) South African Rugby League	South Africa	–	–	1998	1998	2012
(Ukraine) Ukrainian Federation of Rugby League	Ukraine	–	–	2008	2013	2013
Wales Rugby League	Wales	Wales	Wales	2005	2010	2010

=== Affiliate members ===
Association	National teams			Founded	Affiliation	
Association	Men	Women	Wheelchair	Founded	IRL	ERL
Cameroon Rugby League 13	Cameroon	–	–	2017		
Canada Rugby League	Canada	Canada	–	2010		
(Czech Republic) Czech Rugby League Association	Czech Republic	–	–	2005		
(Germany) Nationaler Rugby League Deutschland	Germany	–	–	2014		
Ghana Rugby League	Ghana	Ghana	–	2014		
(Greece) Greek Rugby League Association	Greece	Greece	–	2017		
Rugby League Ireland	Ireland	Ireland	Ireland	1988	2000	2003
(Italy) Federazione Italiana Rugby League	Italy	Italy	Italy	2008	2010	2010
Kenya Rugby League	Kenya	Kenya	–			2023
(Lebanon) Lebanese Rugby League Federation	Lebanon	Lebanon	–	2003	2012	2003
Malta Rugby League	Malta	Malta	–	2008		
(Morocco) Fédération Marocaine de Rugby League	Morocco	–	–	2011		
(Netherlands) Netherlandse Rugby League Bond	Netherlands	Netherlands	–	2009		
Nigeria Rugby League	Nigeria	Nigeria	–	2018		
Norway Rugby League	Norway	–	–	2009		
(Russia) Russian Rugby League	Russia	Russia	–	2010	2013	2013
Scotland Rugby League	Scotland	Scotland	Scotland	1994	2011	2003
(Turkey) Turkish Rugby League Association	Turkey	Turkey	–	2016		
(United States) USA Rugby League	United States	United States	United States	2011		

=== Official observers ===
- (Albania) Albanian Rugby League
- Bosnia and Herzegovina Rugby League Association
- (Bulgaria) Bulgarian Rugby League Federation
- Burundi Rugby League
- (Ivory Coast) Cote D'Ivoire Rugby League XIII
- (Democratic Republic of the Congo) DR Congo Rugby League XIII
- El Salvador Rugby League
- (Hungary) Hungarian Rugby League Federation
- Libya Rugby League Association
- Montenegro Rugby League
- (Palestine) Palestinian Rugby League
- (Poland) Polska Rugby XIII
- Sierra Leone Rugby League
- (Spain) Asociación Española de Rugby League
- Sweden Rugby League
- Rugby League Uganda

=== Former members / observers ===
- Affiliate
  - Latvia Rugby League
- Observers
  - Austria Rugby League
  - Belgium Rugby League Association
  - Rugby League Association of Catalonia
  - (Denmark) Dansk Rugby League
  - Estonia Rugby League Federation
  - Ethiopia Rugby League
  - (Georgia (country)) Georgia Rugby League
  - (Romania) Federația Româna de Rugby XIII
  - (Portugal) Portuguese Rugby League Association
  - (Saudi Arabia) Saudi Arabian Rugby League Association
  - (Trinidad and Tobago) Trinidad & Tobago Rugby League Association
  - (United Arab Emirates) Emirates Rugby League

== See also ==
- International Rugby League
- Asia-Pacific Rugby League
