= International rugby league in 2020 =

A list of men and women international rugby league matches played throughout 2020 and does not include wheelchair rugby league international matches. A † denotes a recognised, but unofficial match that did not contribute to the IRL World Rankings.

Many fixtures scheduled were cancelled or rescheduled due to the ongoing COVID-19 pandemic. The Kangaroo tour of England, Oceania Cup, and European Championship were all cancelled. The European Championship B, European Championship C, European Championship D and Americas Championship were all postponed until 2021, whilst the MEA Championship was postponed until a later date not confirmed.

As a result of the travel restrictions from COVID-19, only two respective men's and women's test matches were played in 2020; a men's international between Peru and Brazil in Sydney before the pandemic began, the Griffin Cup match between Germany and Netherlands, and a women's 'Clash of the Pacific' double-header in Auckland where Tonga and Niue, and New Zealand and Tonga played each other.

== Season overview ==
Men's international tours
Start date	Touring side	Region	Results [Matches]
No international men's tours in 2020
Men's international friendlies
Start date	Home team	Away team	Winners
22 February 2020	Peru	Brazil	Brazil
26 September 2020	Netherlands	Germany	Netherlands
Men's international tournaments
Start date	Tournament		Winners
No international men's tournaments in 2020

Women's international tours
Start date	Touring side	Region	Results [Matches]
No international women's tours in 2020
Women's international friendlies
Start date	Home team	Away team	Winners
7 November 2020	Tonga	Niue	Tonga
7 November 2020	New Zealand	Samoa	New Zealand
Women's international tournaments
Start date	Tournament		Winners
No international women's tournaments in 2020

== Rankings ==
The following were the rankings at the beginning of the season.

IRL Men's World Rankings
Official rankings as of 18 November 2019
Rank	Change	Team	Points %
1	▲2	New Zealand	100.00%
2	▼1	Australia	91.82%
3	▼1	England	85.34%
4	Steady	Tonga	60.66%
5	Steady	Fiji	36.57%
6	▲4	Papua New Guinea	28.53%
7	Steady	Samoa	22.09%
8	▼2	France	16.69%
9	▼1	Scotland	15.00%
10	▼1	Lebanon	11.81%
11	▲5	Greece	11.38%
12	Steady	Ireland	11.36%
13	▲1	Italy	7.86%
14	▼3	Wales	7.75%
15	▲4	Serbia	0.00%
16	▲1	Malta	6.77%
17	▲1	Norway	5.63%
18	▼3	United States	5.39%
19	▲4	Poland	5.35%
20	▼7	Jamaica	5.04%
21	▼1	Hungary	4.27%
22	▲3	Czech Republic	4.16%
23	▲5	Cook Islands	3.87%
24	▲7	Turkey	3.51%
25	▼1	Netherlands	3.29%
26	▲4	Spain	3.18%
27	▼6	Canada	2.81%
28	New entry	Nigeria	2.51%
29	▼2	Solomon Islands	2.32%
30	▲10	Sweden	2.16%
31	▲4	Germany	1.95%
32	▲1	Chile	1.86%
33	New entry	Ghana	1.80%
34	▲16	Morocco	1.69%
35	▼3	Vanuatu	1.47%
36	Steady	South Africa	1.46%
37	▼8	Russia	1.41%
38	New entry	Cameroon	1.31%
39	▼2	Ukraine	1.21%
40	▲1	Colombia	1.06%
41	▲4	Brazil	0.50%
42	Steady	Belgium	0.30%
43	▲4	Denmark	0.13%
44	▲4	Bulgaria	0.10%
45	▲4	Latvia	0.07%
*Change from July 2019
Complete rankings at INTRL.SPORT

IRL Women's World Rankings
Official rankings as of 18 November 2019
Rank	Change	Team	Points %
1	Steady	Australia	
2	Steady	New Zealand	
3	Steady	England	
4	▲2	Papua New Guinea	
5	▼1	Canada	
6	▼1	France	
7	▼2	Cook Islands	
8	Steady	Italy	
9	New entry	Serbia	
10	New entry	Fiji	
11	New entry	Turkey	
12	New entry	Samoa	
13	New entry	Brazil	
14	▼6	Lebanon	
15	New entry	Greece	
*Change from July 2019
Complete rankings at INTRL.SPORT

== February ==
=== Peru men vs Brazil in Australia ===
22 February 2020
17:00 AEDT (UTC+11:00)

Peru	14–30	Brazil
Tries: N. Ibarburu, Sommers, Zarate; Goals: G. Altamirano (1/3)	Report	Tries: Araújo, De Araujo, Howison, Jackson, Viñas; Goals: Nunes (5/5)

Hillier Oval, Sydney
Attendance: 350
Referee: Matthew Middelton (Australia)

== September ==
=== Griffin Cup ===
Griffin Cup

26 September 2020
17:00 CEST (UTC+02:00)

Netherlands	20–18	Germany
Tries: Longhurst, Farrell, Schoenmaker; Goals: Gout (4/4)	Report	Tries: Hampson (2), Seidler; Goals: Billsborough (1/1), Esser (1/1), Doughton (1/1)

RC Zwolle, Zwolle
Referee: Jaroslav Bzoch (Czech Republic)

== November ==
=== Tonga women vs Niue in New Zealand ===
7 November 2020
14:00 NZDT (UTC+13:00)

Tonga	66–8	Niue
Tries: Hufanga (3), Taulanga (2), Filimoe'atu (2), Sikei (2), Vailea, Huni, Maumau-Pinomi; Goals: Hufanga (9/12)	Report; Highlights	Tries: Kamutoa, Hiko

Mt Smart Stadium, Auckland

=== New Zealand women vs Samoa ===
7 November 2020
16:00 NZDT (UTC+13:00)

New Zealand	28–8	Samoa
Tries: Stephens (2), Hansen, Hireme-Smiler, Vaha'akolo, Tamarua; Goals: Hansen (2/4), Paul (0/2)	Report; Video Replay	Tries: Lemanu, Tufuga; Goals: Eli (0/2)

Mt Smart Stadium, Auckland
Referee: Viggo Rasmussen

== See also ==
- Impact of the COVID-19 pandemic on rugby league
