= 2018–19 Rugby League European Championship C =

2018–19 European Championship C
- Number of teams: 6
- Winner: Greece (2nd title)
- Matches played: 7
- Attendance: 3,820 (546 per match)
- Points scored: 378 (54 per match)
- Tries scored: 69 (9.86 per match)
- Top scorer: (Greece) Jordan Meads (50)
- Top try scorers: (Norway) Kristoffer Borsheim (5) (Greece) Terry Constantinou (5)

The 2018–19 Rugby League European Championship C (also known as Euro C) was the tenth edition of the Rugby League European Championship C and acted as the initial phase of European qualifying to the 2021 Men's Rugby League World Cup. The series involves two pools of three teams in a round-robin tournament. These matches took place between 16 June and 15 September 2018, with the final match taking place on 18 May 2019, where Greece defeat Norway to progress to the next round of European repechage qualifying against Scotland and Serbia.

== Fixtures ==
=== Group A ===
Group A consisted of northern European nations; Czech Republic, Germany and Norway.

Pos	Team	Pld	W	D	L	PF	PA	PD	Pts	Qualification
1	Norway	2	1	0	1	52	42	+10	2	Advance to Championship Final
2	Germany	2	1	0	1	46	44	+2	2	
3	Czech Republic	2	1	0	1	24	36	−12	2	

Source: ERL

16 June 2018
17:00 CEST (UTC+02:00)

Czech Republic	20–12	Norway
Tries: Chrbolka, Heininger, Kittl; Goals: Koliska (4/5)	Report	Tries: Cummins, McIntyre; Goals: Cummins (2/2)

Vrchlabí Football Stadium, Vrchlabí
Attendance: 1,000
Referee: Radoslav Novaković (Serbia)
Player of the Match: Patrik Koliska (Czech Republic)

Team details

FB	1	Patrik Koliska
WG	2	Oldřich Chrbolka
CE	3	Filip Špaček
CE	4	Filip-Daniel Kittl
WG	5	Jan Murdoch
FE	6	Ladislav Cintler
HB	7	Tomáš Řičica (c)
PR	8	Tomáš Adamec
HK	9	Petr Šedina
PR	10	Pavel Mejstřík
SR	11	Jan Heininger
SR	12	Richard Gach
LK	13	Ondřej Preininger
Interchange:
BE	14	Dominik Machek
BE	15	Lukáš Kristof
BE	16	Adam Petržela
BE	18	Aleš Pour
Coach:
Ladislav Cintler

FB	1	Frank Kiriinya
WG	2	Bendik Kalvik
CE	3	Kristoffer Borsheim
CE	4	Fredrik Nordtun
WG	5	Ole Magnus Brekk
FE	6	Simon Viljoen
HB	7	Nathan Cummins
PR	8	Ezra McIntyre
HK	9	Kristoffer Milligan (c)
PR	10	Mathias Vada Stenseth-Holm
SR	11	Kristian Nordin-Skipnes
SR	12	Kevin Båtnes
LK	13	Isaac Schmidt
Interchange:
BE	14	Kim André Seglem
BE	15	Ravn Arvidsønn
BE	16	Christoffer Stalsberg
BE	17	Sonny Mellor
Coach:
Dave Hunter

25 August 2018
16:00 CEST (UTC+02:00)

Germany	24–4	Czech Republic
Tries: Wood (2), Billsborough, Dent; Goals: Billsborough (4/5)	Report	Tries: Chrbolka; Goals: Řičica (0/1)

Ballsport e.V., Osnabrück
Attendance: 250
Referee: Andrew Pilkington (Spain)
Touch judges: Max Doughton (Germany), Nikos Hatzinikos (Greece)
Player of the Match: Brad Billsborough (Germany)

Team details

FB	1	Ben Dent
WG	2	Jannek Hagenah
CE	3	George Wood
CE	4	Sebastian Peter
WG	5	David Ziekursch
FE	6	Brad Billsborough (c)
HB	7	Marc Zupan
PR	18	Connor Hampson
HK	9	Liam Doughton
PR	10	Sebastian Roczyn
SR	11	Martin Apostel
SR	12	Joshua Leutenecker
LK	13	Philip Hunz
Interchange:
BE	14	Vivi Seelweger
BE	15	Phil Wadewitz
BE	16	Renko Flemming
BE	19	Karsten Brüning
Co-coaches:
Bob Doughton; Simon Cooper

FB	1	Jan Mudroch
WG	2	Oldřich Chrbolka
CE	3	Antonín Berk
CE	4	Filip-Daniel Kittl
WG	5	Filip Špaček
FE	6	Tomáš Řičica (c)
HB	7	Jakub Hudrlík
PR	8	Bruno Jasiczek
HK	9	Petr Šedina
PR	10	Ondřej Maňák
SR	11	Ondřej Preininger
SR	12	Jan Heininger
LK	13	Josef Maňák
Interchange:
BE	14	Tomáš Adamec
BE	15	Richard Gach
BE	16	Lukáš Krištof
BE	18	Aleš Pour
Coach:
Ladislav Cintler

15 September 2018
15:00 CEST (UTC+02:00)

Norway	40–22	Germany
Tries: Borsheim (4), Cummins, Kalvik, Milligan, Viljoen; Goals: Cummins (2/6), Nordtun (2/2)	Report	Tries: Billsborough, Hampson, Hoggins, Hunz; Goals: Billsborough (3/4)

Kjølnes Idrettspark, Porsgrunn
Attendance: 562
Referee: James Spencer (Ireland)

=== Group B ===
Group B consisted of southern European nations; Greece, Malta and Ukraine.

Pos	Team	Pld	W	D	L	PF	PA	PD	Pts	Qualification
1	Greece	2	2	0	0	88	30	+58	4	Advance to Championship Final
2	Ukraine	2	1	0	1	60	50	+10	2	
3	Malta	2	0	0	2	26	94	−68	0	

Source: ERL

30 June 2018
18:00 CEST (UTC+02:00)

Malta	22–34	Ukraine
Tries: Falzon (2), J. Attard, Maylor; Goals: M. Attard (2/3), Chircop (1/1)	Report	Tries: Semerenko (2), Andreychenko, Scherbina, Skorbach, Troyan; Goals: Mazepa (5/6)

Marsa Sports Complex, Marsa
Attendance: 500
Referee: Radoslav Novaković (Serbia)
Touch judges: Roman Bykhov (Ukraine), Adrian Seglem (Norway)

Team details

FB	1	Nathan Falzon
WG	2	Jean Pierre Zarb
CE	3	Jon Jon Micallef
CE	4	Matt Camilleri (c)
WG	5	Shaun Chircop
FE	6	Malcolm Attard
HB	7	Aaron Grech
PR	8	Vince Farrugia
HK	9	Jake Attard
PR	26	Jeremy Dela
SR	11	Ian Catania
SR	12	Nicky Maylor
LK	13	Tyson Freeman
Interchange:
BE	14	Jamie Brincat Brockdorff
BE	15	Joseph Pio Mizzi
BE	17	Clive Sciberras
BE	25	Ben Naudi
Coaches:
Sam Blyton-Keep

FB	1	Bogdan Veprik
WG	2	Mikhail Troyan
CE	3	Mikhailo Pavliv
CE	4	Svyatoslav Andreychenko
WG	5	Anatoly Grankovskii
FE	6	Aleksandr Skorbach (c)
HB	7	Vladimir Mazepa
PR	8	Volodymyr Radchik
HK	9	Dmitriy Semrenko
PR	10	Nazar Semion
SR	14	Evgenii Trusov
SR	12	Aleksandr Sivokoz
LK	13	Aleksandr Scherbina
Interchange:
BE	11	Vladimir Karpenko
BE	15	Igor Yurkin
BE	16	Ostap Grischenko
BE	22	Sergii Kravchenko
Coach:
Gennady Veprik

8 September 2018
17:00 EEST (UTC+03:00)

Ukraine	26–28	Greece
Tries: Andreychenko, Shalaev, Sivokoz, Skorbach, Veprik; Goals: Skorbach (3/5)	Report	Tries: Meads (2), N. Bosmos, Constantinou, Kartsonakis; Goals: Meads (4/6)

Dynamo Stadium, Kharkiv
Attendance: 700
Referee: Matthew Rossleigh (England)
Touch judges: Aleksey Markov (Ukraine), Aleksey Shkolny (Ukraine)

Team details

FB	1	Bogdan Veprik
WG	2	Svyatoslav Andreychenko
CE	3	Mikhail Troyan
CE	4	Nikolai Shalaev
WG	5	Anatoly Grankovskii
FE	6	Aleksandr Skorbach (c)
HB	7	Mikhailo Pavliv
PR	8	Volodymyr Radchik
HK	9	Dmitriy Semerenko
PR	10	Aleksandr Kozak
SR	11	Andriy Shakura
SR	12	Evgenii Trusov
LK	13	Aleksandr Scherbina
Interchange:
BE	15	Ostap Grischenko
BE	16	Aleksandr Sivokoz
BE	17	Dmitrii Kaevich
BE	23	Igor Yurkin
Coach:
Gennady Veprik

FB	1	Dimosthenis Kartsonakis
WG	2	Nikolaos Kourkakis
CE	3	Alvaro Zota
CE	4	Konstantinos Katsidonis
WG	5	Michail Bosmos
FE	6	Nikolaos Bosmos
HB	20	Jordan Meads (c)
PR	8	Stefanos Bastas
HK	9	Ioannis Nake
PR	15	Ioannis Rousoglou
SR	11	Sebastian Sell
SR	12	Robert Tuliatu
LK	13	Terry Constantinou
Interchange:
BE	7	Konstantinos Koutras
BE	14	Komninos Tsavaris
BE	16	Eugenios Malai
BE	17	Panteleimon Tsattalios
Coach:
Michalis Chatziioannou

15 September 2018
16:00 EEST (UTC+03:00)

Greece	60–4	Malta
Tries: Constantinou (2), Katsidonis (2), Meads (2), Tsattalios (2), Malai, Tuliatu, Zampetides; Goals: Meads (6/9), N. Bosmos (2/2)	Report	Tries: Caruana; Goals: Chircop (0/1)

Glyka Nera Stadium, Athens
Attendance: 200
Referee: Benjamin Casty (France)
Touch judges: Aris Dardamanis (Greece), Dimitris Kogianos (Greece)

Team details

FB	1	Dimosthenis Kartsonakis
WG	2	Nikolaos Kourkakis
CE	3	Alvaro Zota
CE	4	Konstantinos Katsidonis
WG	5	Ioannis Nake
FE	17	Pantelis Tsattalios
HB	20	Jordan Meads (c)
PR	8	Stefanos Bastas
HK	9	Nikolaos Bosmos
PR	15	Ioannis Rousoglou
SR	11	Mitchell Zampetides
SR	12	Robert Tuliatu
LK	13	Terry Constantinou
Interchange:
BE	6	Michail Bosmos
BE	7	Konstantinos Koutras
BE	14	Komninos Tsavaris
BE	16	Eugenios Malai
Coach:
Michalis Chatziiannou

FB	1	Jake Scott
WG	6	Jean Pierre Zarb
CE	3	Pete Debono
CE	4	Jon Jon Micallef
WG	5	Shaun Chircop
FE	2	Liam Davis
HB	7	Adam Campbell
PR	8	Dean Zammit
HK	9	Josh Caruana
PR	10	Vince Farrugia
SR	17	Damien Davis
SR	12	Nicky Maylor
LK	13	Joseph Pio Mizzi (c)
Interchange:
BE	11	Clive Sciberras
BE	14	Sam Blyton-Keep
BE	16	Liam Scicluna
Coach:
Sam Blyton-Keep

=== Final ===
At the draw for the groupings for the 2019 Rugby League European play-off tournament it was announced that the Championship C final will be played in London on 18 May 2019. This match acted as a curtain raiser for a League 1 fixture between the London Skolars and Doncaster, which posted a crowd of 608.

Championship Final

18 May 2019
13:00 BST (UTC+01:00)

Greece	56–26	Norway
Tries: Mamouzelos (4), Constantinou (2), Nianiakas (2), Kartsonakis, Tuliatu; Goals: Meads (7/8), Bastas (1/1), Mamouzelos (0/1)	Report	Tries: Diggs (2), Borsheim, Milligan, Nordtun; Goals: Nordtun (2/4), Cummins (1/1)

New River Stadium, London
Attendance: 608
Referee: Cameron Worsley (England)
Touch judges: Shane Daniel (England), Joe Turner (England)

Team details

FB	1	Terry Constantinou
WG	2	Ioannis Nake
CE	3	Konstantinos Katsidonis
CE	4	Dimosthenis Kartsonakis
WG	5	Nikolaos Kourkakis
FE	6	Nikolaos Bosmos
HB	7	Jordan Meads (c)
PR	8	Stefanos Bastas
HK	9	Peter Mamouzelos
PR	12	Ioannis Rousoglou
SR	11	Theodoros Nianiakas
SR	10	Grigoris Koutsimpogiorgos
LK	13	Robert Tuliatu
Interchange:
BE	14	Aris Dardamanis
BE	15	Pantelis Tsattalios
BE	17	Ioannis Dimakas
BE	18	Giorgos Tsiakos
Coach:
Jim Pizanias

FB	1	Stephen Mwikaria
WG	2	Casey Diggs
CE	3	Kristoffer Borsheim
CE	4	Fredrik Nordtun
WG	5	Bendik Kalvik
FE	6	Nathan Cummins
HB	7	Simon Viljoen
PR	8	Sam Mullins
HK	9	Kristoffer Milligan (c)
PR	10	Ezra McIntyre
SR	11	Nils Kristian Holte
SR	12	Kristian Nordin-Skipnes
LK	13	Brett Harvey
Interchange:
BE	14	Sonny Mellor
BE	15	Christoffer Stalsberg
BE	16	Lucas Zuniga
BE	17	Josh Skidmore-Hornby
Coach:
Dave Hunter

== See also ==
- International rugby league in 2018
- International rugby league in 2019
- 2021 Men's Rugby League World Cup qualification
- 2018 Rugby League European Championship
- 2018 Rugby League European Championship B
