= Eden Park =

Sports stadium in Auckland, New Zealand

- New Zealand's National Stadium

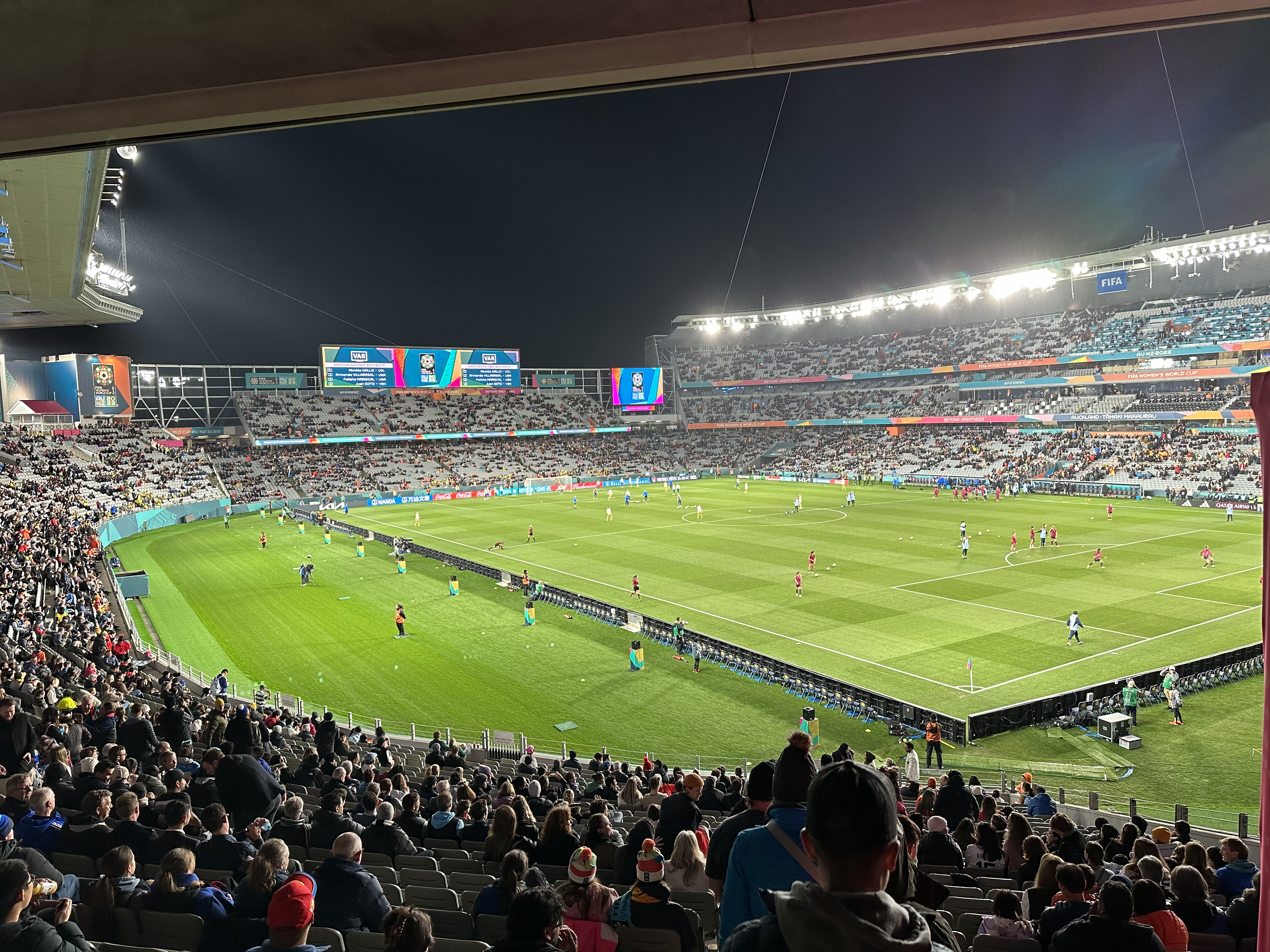
- Eden Park during the 2023 FIFA Women's World Cup semi-final
- Interactive map of Eden Park
- Location: Kingsland, New Zealand
- Coordinates: 36°52′30″S 174°44′41″E
- Owner: Eden Park Trust Board
- Operator: Eden Park Trust Board
- Capacity: 50,000 (Football codes – with standard seating) 60,000 (Rugby union and league – with temporary seating) 42,000 (Cricket)
- Surface: MOTZ turf
- Record attendance: 61,240 (New Zealand vs South Africa, 1 September 1956)

Construction
- Opened: 1900; 126 years ago
- Architects: HOK Sports, now Populous (reconstruction)
- Structural engineers: Connell Wagner, now Aurecon (reconstruction)

Tenants
- Blues (1996–present); Auckland Rugby (1913–present); Auckland Cricket (1903–present); New Zealand Warriors (season openers) (2011–2014); NRL Auckland Nines (2014–2017); Auckland FC (2026–present) (Only for the OFC Professional League matches)

Website
- edenpark.co.nz

Ground information
- End names
- Broadcasting End; Terraces End

International information
- First men's Test: 14–17 February 1930: New Zealand v England
- Last men's Test: 22–26 March 2018: New Zealand v England
- First men's ODI: 22 February 1976: New Zealand v India
- Last men's ODI: 11 January 2025: New Zealand v Sri Lanka
- First men's T20I: 17 February 2005: New Zealand v Australia
- Last men's T20I: 6 November 2025: New Zealand v West Indies
- First women's Test: 26–29 March 1949: New Zealand v England
- Last women's Test: 27–29 December 1957: New Zealand v England
- First women's ODI: 20 January 1988: New Zealand v Australia
- Last women's ODI: 20 March 2022: New Zealand v England
- First women's T20I: 22 February 2012: New Zealand v England
- Last women's T20I: 1 April 2021: New Zealand v Australia
- As of 25 February 2024; Source: Cricinfo

Eden Park Outer Oval
- Interactive map of Eden Park Outer Oval

Ground information
- Location: Auckland
- Country: New Zealand
- End names
- City End; Sandringham End

International information
- First women's ODI: 10 January 1982: Australia v India
- Last women's ODI: 27 January 2020: New Zealand v South Africa
- As of 21 January 2024; Source: Cricinfo

Eden Park is a sports venue in Auckland, New Zealand. It is located three kilometres southwest of the Auckland CBD, on the boundary between the suburbs of Mount Eden and Kingsland. The main stadium has a nominal capacity of 50,000 and is New Zealand's national stadium. The stadium is used primarily for rugby union in winter and cricket in summer, and has also hosted rugby league and association football matches, as well as concerts and cultural events. It is owned and operated by the Eden Park Trust Board, whose headquarters are located in the stadium.

Eden Park is considered international rugby union's most difficult ground for visiting sides. New Zealand's national rugby union team, the All Blacks, have been unbeaten at this venue in 54 consecutive test matches stretching back to 1994. Eden Park is the site of the 2021 Te Matatini. It was the site for the 2022 Women's Cricket World Cup, the final of the 2021 Women's Rugby World Cup and staged the opening match of the 2023 FIFA Women's World Cup. In 2011 it hosted pool games, two quarter-finals, both semi-finals and the final of 2011 Rugby World Cup. In doing so it became the first stadium in the world to host two Rugby World Cup finals, having held the inaugural final in 1987. It was a venue for the 2015 Cricket World Cup, which was jointly hosted by Australia and New Zealand. Eden Park also hosted the final of the 1985–1988 Rugby League World Cup.

== History ==
=== Origins of Eden Park ===
The flooding of Eden Park in 1907

The land where Eden Park stands was originally swampland, fed by lava caverns created by Maungawhau / Mount Eden and Mount Albert over 30,000 years ago. Tāmaki Māori used the swamp to collect food and materials. In 1845, the area was purchased by Cornish farmer John Walters. Eden Park has been a sports ground since 1900. The park began as a cricket ground in 1903, and was due to the vision of one Harry Ryan, a cricket enthusiast who approached landowner John Walters to lease part of his land as a sports field. In the book Eden Park: A History, the authors write, "Certainly the rough paddock strewn with stones, studded with outcrops of rock and streaked with cowpats, falling away to a boggy trough that filled in a downpour and remained flooded throughout the winter, looked better suited to frog-hunting or duck-shooting than cricket, let alone rugby. Ryan knew or at least imagined better." Much early work on the cricket ground was needed, including clearing the stone walls that had been used to divide farmland, and ongoing drainage issues.

Those who saw Ryan's vision as madness most likely felt vindicated when, in 1907, massive downpours of rain saw the ground submerged in water for a week. The same thing happened again later in the year. By 1910, the ongoing maintenance costs led the Eden District Cricket Club to approach the Auckland Cricket Association to take over running the park. By 1912, the land had been transferred from John Walters to the trustees of the cricket association, backed financially by a number of well-known Auckland businessman. The name 'Eden Park' settled into general usage around 1912, soon after it had been taken over by the association.

=== Opening as a cricket and rugby venue ===
In 1913 the park was leased to the Auckland Rugby Football Union, becoming both a summer and winter sporting venue, with the union leasing the venue initially for 21 years. The union agreed to pay to build the park's first grandstand, erected in 1913 to hold an audience of 2,500, and later followed by a second members' stand built in 1914. In 1914, the first international cricket match was held, with Auckland hosting Australia. The first rugby match played at the venue was a seven-a-side series on 9 May 1914, and the first representative match was played on 5 September, against Wellington. Drainage issues ceased to be a regular issue for Kingsland and Eden Park in the 1920s, after which the park began to flourish. The first rugby test was held on 27 August 1921, when South Africa beat New Zealand 5–9 before a crowd of 40,000. The Auckland Rugby Football Union officially made Eden Park its home in 1925, and in 1926, a trust was set up to manage Eden Park primarily for the benefit of Auckland Cricket and Auckland Rugby.

In 1930, the ground hosted its inaugural British and Irish Lions matches as part of the 1930 British Lions tour to New Zealand and Australia. Matches were held against Auckland and New Zealand sides, both won by the home sides with an attendance of 45,000 at the latter. The ground hosted its first match between New Zealand and Australia as part of the 1931 Australia rugby union tour of New Zealand. New Zealand won 20–13. In 1933, New Zealand hosted England in the first cricket test match, where Wally Hammond set an individual test batting record of 336 not out.

Eden Park served as the opening ceremony and athletics venue for the 1950 British Empire Games, when the western part of the grounds were first opened. In 1955, New Zealand hosted England in the second test match of their 1954–55 Tour of New Zealand. During the same year, the New Zealand Parliament passed the Eden Park Trust Act, enshrining the governance structure of the park until 2009. By 1956, the West Stand was completed, followed by the South Stand in 1958. New Zealand won its first cricket test match against the West Indies as part of the 1955–56 West Indies Tour of New Zealand. The ground hosted its third rugby international between New Zealand and South Africa. New Zealand won 11 – 5 before a record crowd of 63,000. The British and Irish Lions returned for the third time in the 1959 British Lions tour to Australia and New Zealand with matches against Auckland and New Zealand. The visitors win both, their first test match win at the ground.

During the 1960s and 70s, further large scale events were held at the venue, including 1961 French tour of New Zealand and Australia, the 1963 England tour of New Zealand, the 1969 Wales rugby union tour of Oceania, a welcoming party for the royal family during the 1970 New Zealand Royal Visit Honours, the Australian tour of New Zealand (1973–74), and a gymnastic display held by touring Russian gymnasts including Olga Korbut. During the 1975 Scotland rugby union tour of New Zealand, both teams famously played during a downpour on a completely saturated pitch, before the one-off test had to be cancelled as the drainage system was unable to cope with the flooding.

During the 1981 Springbok Tour, a low-flying Cessna 172 piloted by Marx Jones and Grant Cole disrupted the final test by dropping flour-bombs on the pitch.

The 1980s saw a number of record events such as a crowd of 43,000 at the 1981–82 Australia Tour of New Zealand, where Australian batsman Greg Chappell dealing with an on ground streaker with his bat. An indoor cricket facility and stand were built next to the outer oval. At the inaugural Rugby World Cup, co-hosted by Australia and New Zealand in 1987, New Zealand defeated France 29 – 9 in the final in front of a crowd of 48,035. In 1988, Eden Park hosted the 1988 Rugby League World Cup final, with Australia defeating New Zealand 25 – 12 before a New Zealand rugby league record crowd of 47,363. This made Eden Park the only venue to have ever hosted (as of 2024) both the Rugby Union and Rugby League World Cup Finals and the only venue to do so in consecutive years. The 1988 World Cup Final was the first game of rugby league played at Eden Park since 1919. Eden Park was a venue during the 1992 Cricket World Cup, cohosted with Australia.

In 1996, the new Auckland Blues began playing at the ground, with the inaugural Super 12 final held at the ground, with the Auckland Blues defeating the Sharks 45 – 21 before a crowd of 46,000. The ground hosted Super 12 finals in 1997, 1998 and 2003. The ground hosted its first rugby test between New Zealand and Ireland as part of the 2002 Ireland Tour of New Zealand. In 2003, the playing surface on the main oval was completely overhauled with the introduction of "Motz" turf.

=== 2011 Rugby World Cup and redevelopment ===
In 2007, the ground was confirmed by the New Zealand Government as the venue for the final of the 2011 Rugby World Cup, with redevelopment beginning in 2008. The ground was the subject of a hotly debated dilemma, as to whether the event should be hosted at historic Eden Park or a new city centre stadium. The redeveloped stadium was officially opened by New Zealand Prime Minister John Key on 10 October. The first event was a Rugby League Four Nations double header, including matches between England and Papua New Guinea, and Australia and New Zealand.

The 2011 Rugby World Cup commenced on 9 September, with New Zealand defeating Tonga 41 – 10 before a crowd of 60,214. In addition to the opening ceremony and match, five pool games, two quarter-finals, both semi-finals and the final are held at Eden Park, with a cumulative attendance of more than 600,000. New Zealand defeated France 8 – 7 before a crowd of 61,079. The ground hosted its first game of professional football, with the Wellington Phoenix hosting Adelaide United before a crowd of 20,078.

In 2013 the New Zealand Warriors announced they would be playing three home games at Eden Park in the 2014 NRL season.

The Auckland Council takes over five of the nine spots on the Eden Park Trust Board, giving ratepayers control over the ground.

In 2015, it hosted four matches during the 2015 Cricket World Cup, which was co-hosted by Australia and New Zealand including the first semi final between New Zealand and South Africa. The stadium hosted its first day night test match during the English cricket tour in 2018.

In 2020, after 117 years, Eden Park sold week-long naming rights to longtime partner, ASB. As part of their commitment to small business in New Zealand, ASB gifted their naming rights to Coopers Catch, a small fish-and-chip shop from Kaikōura.

=== Hosting concerts ===
In 2021, Eden Park was granted resource consent to host up to six concerts per year. Eden Park hosted a concert for the first time since 1975, headlined by the band Six60 to a sold-out crowd of about 50,000 attendees. The concert was also one of the biggest concerts in the world at the time, due to COVID-19.

Since then, the stadium has hosted concerts for touring artists and acts including Billy Joel, Guns N' Roses, Ed Sheeran, Pink, Travis Scott and Metallica. Eden Park is currently in the process of applying to double its concert quota to 12 concerts per year.

Coldplay played three sold-out shows at Eden Park in November 2024, the most concerts ever played at the venue for a touring artist.

The stadium will host British singer Robbie Williams on 24 November 2026, as part of his Britpop Tour.

== Redevelopment ==
=== Capacity ===
The $256 million redevelopment completed in October 2010 provided a permanent capacity of 50,000 with a further 10,000 temporary seats for the 2011 Rugby World Cup games. This is the largest of any New Zealand sports arena. There are no standing areas. Temporary seating in front of the North Stand and the West Stand (usually only used for international rugby matches) is required for the capacity to be reached. Due to sight-screens and the larger area required for cricket matches, cricket capacity is smaller.

Prior to redevelopment, Eden Park had a crowd capacity of 45,472 for rugby and 42,000 for cricket .

=== Expansion ===
The redevelopment project included a three-tier South stand replacing the old South and West stands, with a capacity of 24,000, and a three-tier East replacing the Terraces. The number of covered seats increased from 23,000 to 38,000. The redeveloped Eden Park has an internal concourse that allows people to circulate around the grounds inside the stadium, and facilities including food and beverage outlets, toilets and corporate areas were incorporated. The open plan approach to the design and establishment of a community centre and green space, and the removal of the perimeter fence, mean that the stadium has become more publicly accessible and a part of the neighbourhood.

There were public concerns about the height of the new structure and its shading effect on many nearby houses. Auckland City Council received 470 submissions on the resource consent application, over 300 of which were in favour of the redevelopment. On 26 January 2007, Eden Park received resource consent with 91 conditions imposed. The consent permitted the building of new stands in place of the terraces and south stand, but did not include consent for the NZ$385 million 'full option', which would have included covered seating.

=== Possible alternative stadium for the 2011 Rugby World Cup ===
In September 2006 it was announced that instead of Eden Park, the Government and Auckland City Council were assessing the possibility of a new stadium on Auckland's waterfront to host the 2011 Rugby World Cup. This assessment was part of the Government's formal due diligence process on the decision to redevelop Eden Park. The Government had said it would assist with the funding if a new stadium was built. The Government announced in a report in November 2006 that it would favour a new stadium on the Auckland waterfront, which would have meant that the Eden Park redevelopment would not have gone ahead, and that options for its use or redevelopment would have to be developed. After the Auckland City Council and the Auckland Regional Council differed in their support for the new stadium, the Government changed to supporting the redevelopment of Eden Park, subject to suitable resolution of the design, funding and governance issues.

=== Eden Park 2.1 ===
Eden Park is planned to be renovated over the course of 3 years with a 3 stage renovation plan. This renovation came after the Auckland Council had a vote about which project they wanted to commit to. Stage 1 will see retractable seats being added to the south stand and a new balcony area. This will allow fans to be closer for rectangular sports such as rugby. Then when the seats retracted, it will allow a proper cricket oval configuration in Eden Park. Stage 2 will see the north stand demolished and replaced with a new north stand that will be in line with the south stand for the first time. The north stand will also include a new hotel. Stage 3 will see a retractable roof added which will allow all weather sports and events to be played there. Stage 1 is set to be completed before the 2028 Men's T20 World Cup.

=== Gallery ===
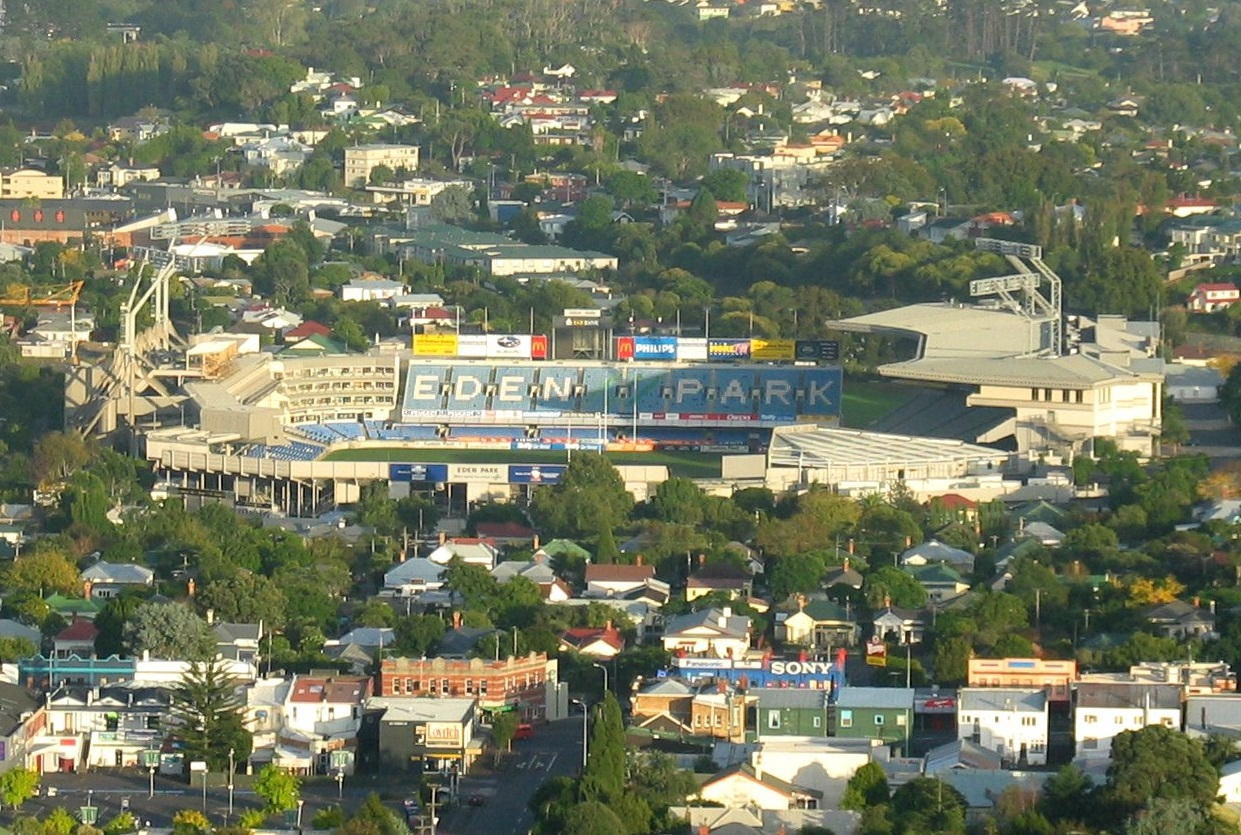
Eden Park in 2005 prior to redevelopment

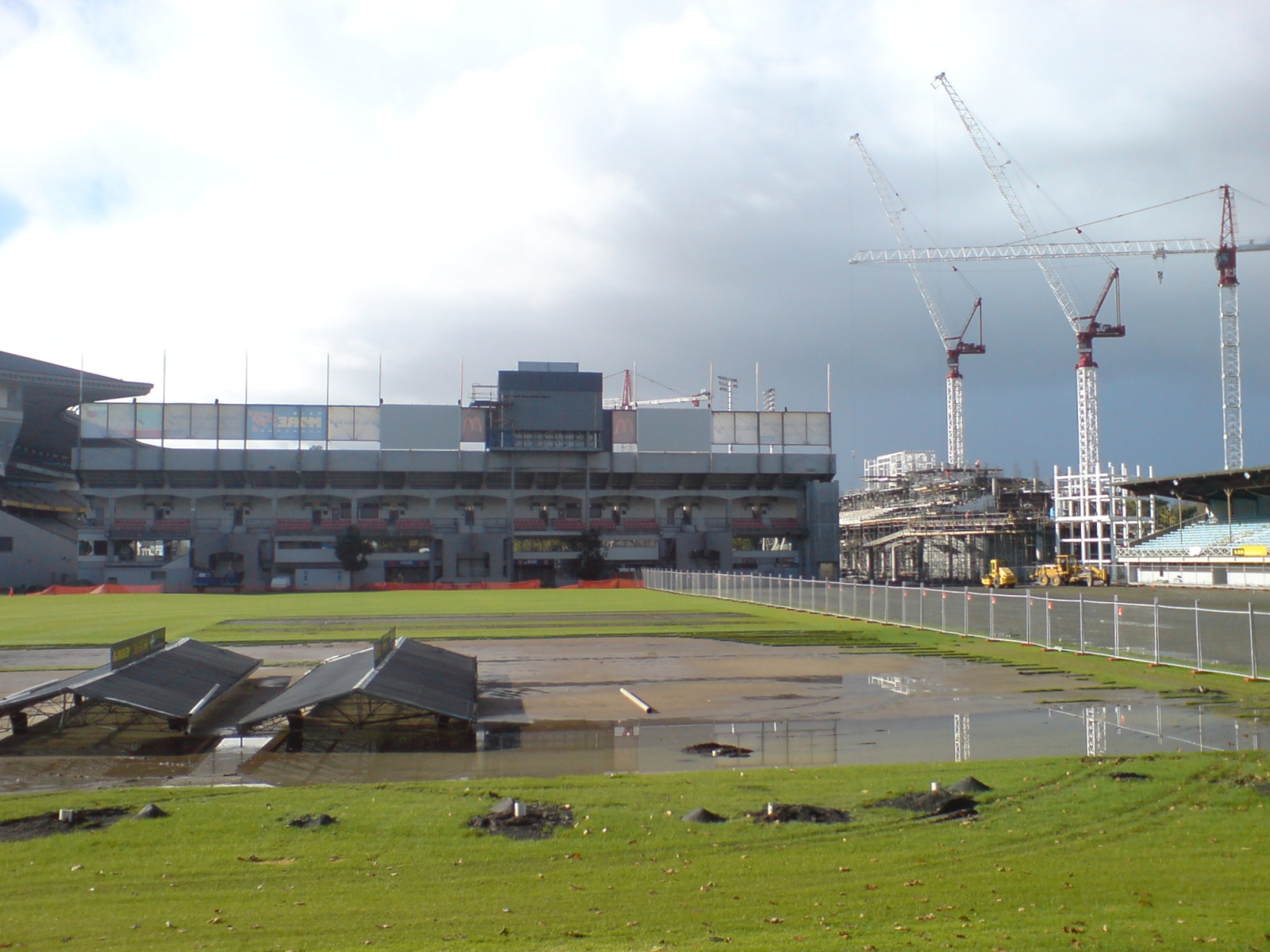
Cranes during the construction of the new South Stand in 2009

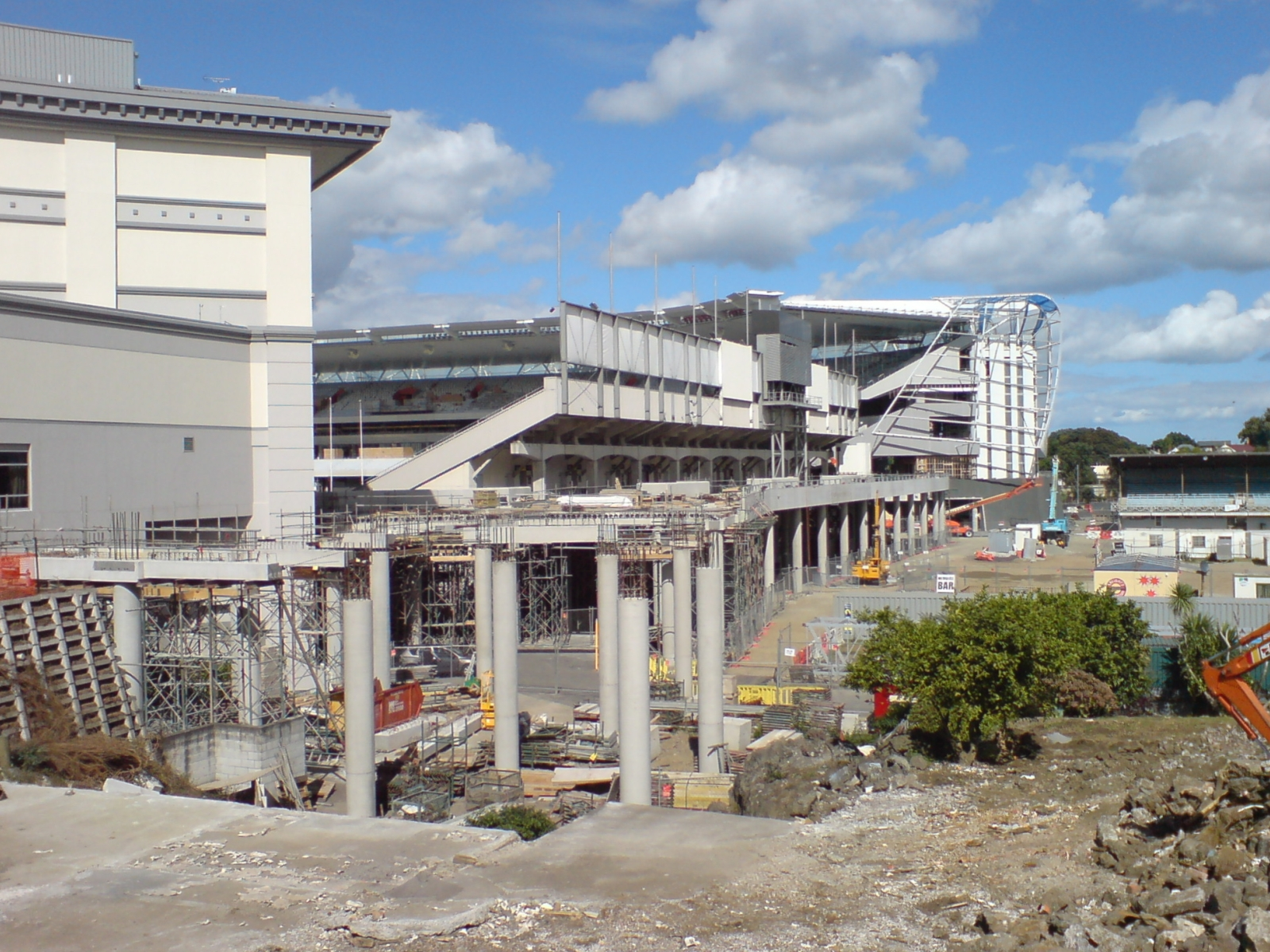
Looking south over the redevelopment of the West Stand at Eden Park in 2009

== Rugby union ==
Eden Park is the home ground for the Auckland Blues in Super Rugby and Auckland in the National Provincial Championship. The ground regularly hosts All Blacks rugby union test matches. Auckland first used the ground in the 1913 season, and the first international fixture was against South Africa in 1921. The Auckland Blues have used the ground since their foundation in 1996.

The final game of the 1981 Springbok Tour was played at Eden Park. A low-flying Cessna 172 piloted by Marx Jones and Grant Cole dropped flour bombs on the field as part of widespread protests against the tour and apartheid.

Eden Park was used in the inaugural 1987 Rugby World Cup and the 2011 Rugby World Cup, both of which the All Blacks won against France, making it the first ground to host two Rugby World Cup finals.

In late 2015, the ground also hosted a public memorial for legendary All Black wing Jonah Lomu after he died at the age of 40.

It was one of the sites for the 2021 Women's Rugby World Cup, including the final.

On Saturday, July 18, 2026, it hosted the Nations Championship Test match where New Zealand beat Ireland 40–21.

New Zealand's overall Test match record at Eden Park against all nations, updated to 17 August 2024, is as follows:

| | Played | Won | Lost | Drawn | New Zealand points | Opposition points | Win percentage |
|---|---|---|---|---|---|---|---|
| Overall | 94 | 81 | 10 | 3 | 2737 | 1235 | 86% |

=== Records ===
Note: Date shown in brackets indicates when the record was or last set.

| Record | New Zealand | Opposition |
|---|---|---|
| Longest winning streak | 38 (22 Apr 1995–8 Jul 2017) | 2 (9 Sept 1978–20 Jun 1981) |
| Longest unbeaten streak | 52 (6 Aug 1994 – Present) | 2 (9 Sept 1978–20 Jun 1981) |
Largest points for
| In a win | 78 (16 June 2017) | 30 (9 September 1978) |
| In a loss | 20 (3 July 1994) | 35 (9 August 1997) |
Largest winning margin
| In a game | 78 (16 June 2017) | 14 (9 September 1978) |
Largest aggregate score
90 (New Zealand 55–35 South Africa) (9 August 1997)

=== Rugby World Cup ===
Eden Park hosted matches of the 1987 and 2011 Rugby World Cups including hosting the final on both occasions.

==== 1987 ====
| Date | Competition | Home team | | Away team | | Attendance |
|---|---|---|---|---|---|---|
| 22 May 1987 | 1987 Rugby World Cup Pool 3 | New Zealand | 70 | Italy | 6 | 20,000 |
| 23 May 1987 | 1987 Rugby World Cup Pool 4 | Romania | 21 | Zimbabwe | 20 | 4,500 |
| 2 June 1987 | 1987 Rugby World Cup Pool 4 | France | 70 | Zimbabwe | 12 | 3,000 |
| 7 June 1987 | 1987 Rugby World Cup Quarter-final 3 | Fiji | 16 | France | 31 | 17,000 |
| 20 June 1987 | 1987 Rugby World Cup Final | New Zealand | 29 | France | 9 | 48,035 |

==== 2011 ====
| Date | Competition | Home team | | Away team | | Attendance |
|---|---|---|---|---|---|---|
| 9 September 2011 | 2011 Rugby World Cup Pool A | New Zealand | 41 | Tonga | 10 | 60,214 |
| 17 September 2011 | 2011 Rugby World Cup Pool C | Australia | 6 | Ireland | 15 | 58,678 |
| 24 September 2011 | 2011 Rugby World Cup Pool A | New Zealand | 37 | France | 17 | 60,856 |
| 25 September 2011 | 2011 Rugby World Cup Pool D | Fiji | 6 | Samoa | 15 | 58,678 |
| 1 October 2011 | 2011 Rugby World Cup Pool B | England | 16 | Scotland | 12 | 58,213 |
| 8 October 2011 | 2011 Rugby World Cup Quarter-final 2 | England | 12 | France | 19 | 49,105 |
| 9 October 2011 | 2011 Rugby World Cup Quarter-final 4 | New Zealand | 33 | Argentina | 10 | 57,192 |
| 15 October 2011 | 2011 Rugby World Cup Semi-final 1 | Wales | 8 | France | 9 | 58,630 |
| 16 October 2011 | 2011 Rugby World Cup Semi-final 2 | New Zealand | 20 | Australia | 6 | 60,087 |
| 21 October 2011 | 2011 Rugby World Cup Bronze Final | Wales | 18 | Australia | 21 | 53,014 |
| 23 October 2011 | 2011 Rugby World Cup Final | New Zealand | 8 | France | 7 | 61,079 |

== Cricket ==
Eden Park is the home ground for the Auckland cricket team. The ground regularly hosts international fixtures, including Tests, ODIs and Twenty20 Internationals, while the Outer Oval also hosts WODIs, domestic List A and Twenty20 games.

It first hosted a test in 1930. The ground was also the host to New Zealand's first Test victory, against West Indies in 1955–56 season. It has also been the scene of a dark day in New Zealand's cricket history when on 28 March 1955, the hosts collapsed to their lowest Test score (26 all out) against England.

The ground hosted four matches during the 1992 Cricket World Cup including the semi-final between New Zealand and Pakistan, which Pakistan won by four wickets en route to winning the tournament after Inzamam-ul-Haq's 60 off 37 in reply to Black Caps captain Martin Crowe's 91. It also hosted four matches during the 2015 Cricket World Cup, which was co-hosted by Australia and New Zealand. The matches played included two pool B games and the pool A clash between co-hosts New Zealand and Australia, which New Zealand won by one wicket via Kane Williamson's six off Pat Cummins with 6 required after Mitchell Starc had taken 6 wickets in reply to Trent Boult's 5. It also hosted the first semifinal between New Zealand and South Africa, which New Zealand won off the penultimate ball with another six – this time by Grant Elliott off Dale Steyn – to advance to their first Cricket World Cup final.

In 2018, Eden Park hosted the first day-night test in New Zealand, against England. England were bowled out for 58 in the first innings. It took New Zealand only 20.4 overs to dismiss England on the first day of the test match. Trent Boult and Tim Southee took six and four wickets each and bowled unchanged throughout the 20.4 overs. No other bowler was required to bowl. This was just the fourth instance that only 2 bowlers were required to dismiss the opposition since 1920. Five England players were dismissed for a duck. Trent Boult (6/32) picked his career best figures in test cricket. This was his second five wicket haul at Eden Park and his second consecutive five wicket haul in day night test cricket, the first one against Australia in Adelaide in 2015 which was the inaugural day night test.

The highest total set by a team here in Test cricket was by the South African national cricket team against the New Zealand national cricket team when they scored 621/5 dec on 27 Feb 1999. The most runs scored in this ground have been by John Wright (1060 runs), Martin Crowe (712 runs) and Nathan Astle (649 runs). The most wickets have been taken by Richard Hadlee- 45 wickets followed by Chris Cairns-35 wickets and Richard Collinge-29 wickets.

In ODI cricket, the highest total has been set by New Zealand national cricket team against the Australian national cricket team when they scored 340/5 on 18 Feb 2007. The most runs scored in this ground have been by Martin Guptill (818 runs), Martin Crowe (719 runs) and Nathan Astle (705 runs). The most wickets have been taken by Chris Cairns-33 wickets, followed by Chris Harris- 28 wickets.

In May 2018, New Zealand Cricket (NZC) said that the ground is no longer cost-effective or financially viable to host cricket matches, and that they were looking at hosting fixtures at the Western Springs Stadium instead.

The ground is also where famed Indian cricket player Sachin Tendulkar made his debut as an ODI opener. Ahead of the second ODI of the New Zealand-India series at the ground in March 1994, regular opener Navjot Singh Sidhu was ruled out with a stiff neck, opening the way for the 21-year-old Tendulkar's promotion. He made 82 off just 49 balls against to steer India to a 7-wicket victory.

It was a site for 2022 Women's Cricket World Cup.

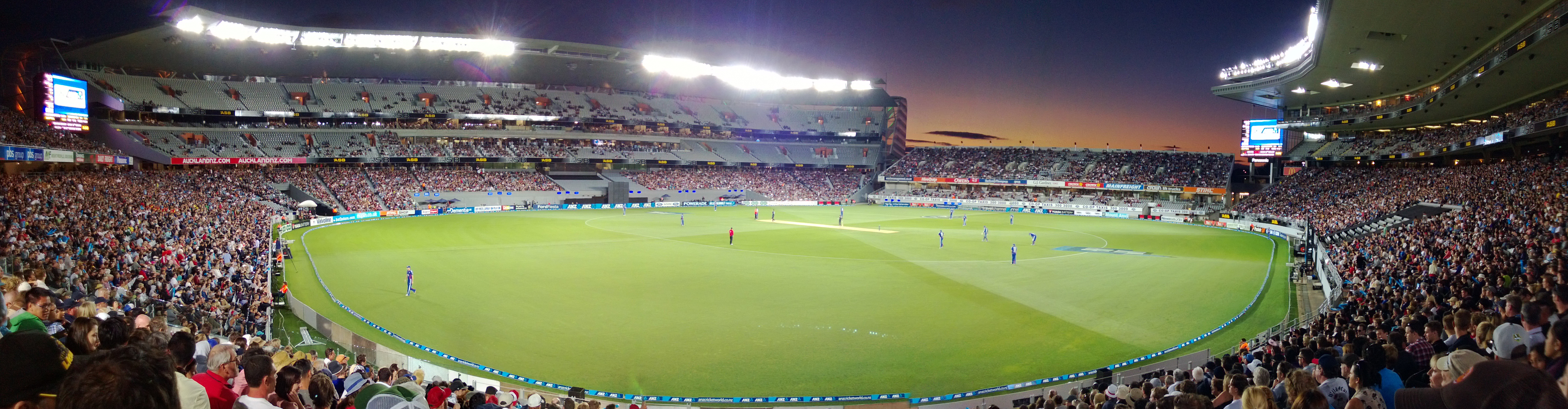
New Zealand v England ODI in 2013, panorama looking south-west

=== World Cup matches ===
1992 Cricket World Cup

22 February
Scorecard

| Australia; 211 (48.1 overs) | v | New Zealand; 248/6 (50 overs) |

New Zealand won by 37 runs
Eden Park, Auckland
Attendance: 30,000

29 February
Scorecard

| South Africa; 190/7 (50 overs) | v | New Zealand; 191/3 (34.3 overs) |

New Zealand won by 7 wickets
Eden Park, Auckland

8 March
Scorecard

| West Indies; 203/7 (50 overs) | v | New Zealand; 206/5 (48.3 overs) |

New Zealand won by 5 wickets
Eden Park, Auckland

21 March
Scorecard

| New Zealand; 262/7 (50 overs) | v | Pakistan; 264/6 (49 overs) |

Pakistan won by 4 wickets
Eden Park, Auckland
Attendance: 40,000

2015 Cricket World Cup

28 February (D/N)
Scorecard

| Australia; 151 (32.2 overs) | v | New Zealand; 152/9 (23.1 overs) |

New Zealand won by 1 wicket
Eden Park, Auckland
Attendance: 40,053

7 March (D/N)
Scorecard

| Pakistan; 222 (46.4 overs) | v | South Africa; 202 (33.3 overs) |

Pakistan won by 29 runs (D/L method)
Eden Park, Auckland
Attendance: 22,713

14 March (D/N)
Scorecard

| Zimbabwe; 287 (48.5 overs) | v | India; 288/4 (48.4 overs) |

India won by 6 wickets
Eden Park, Auckland
Attendance: 30,076

24 March (D/N)
Scorecard

| South Africa; 281/5 (43 overs) | v | New Zealand; 299/6 (42.5 overs) |

New Zealand won by 4 wickets (D/L method)
Eden Park, Auckland
Attendance: 41,279

=== Gallery ===
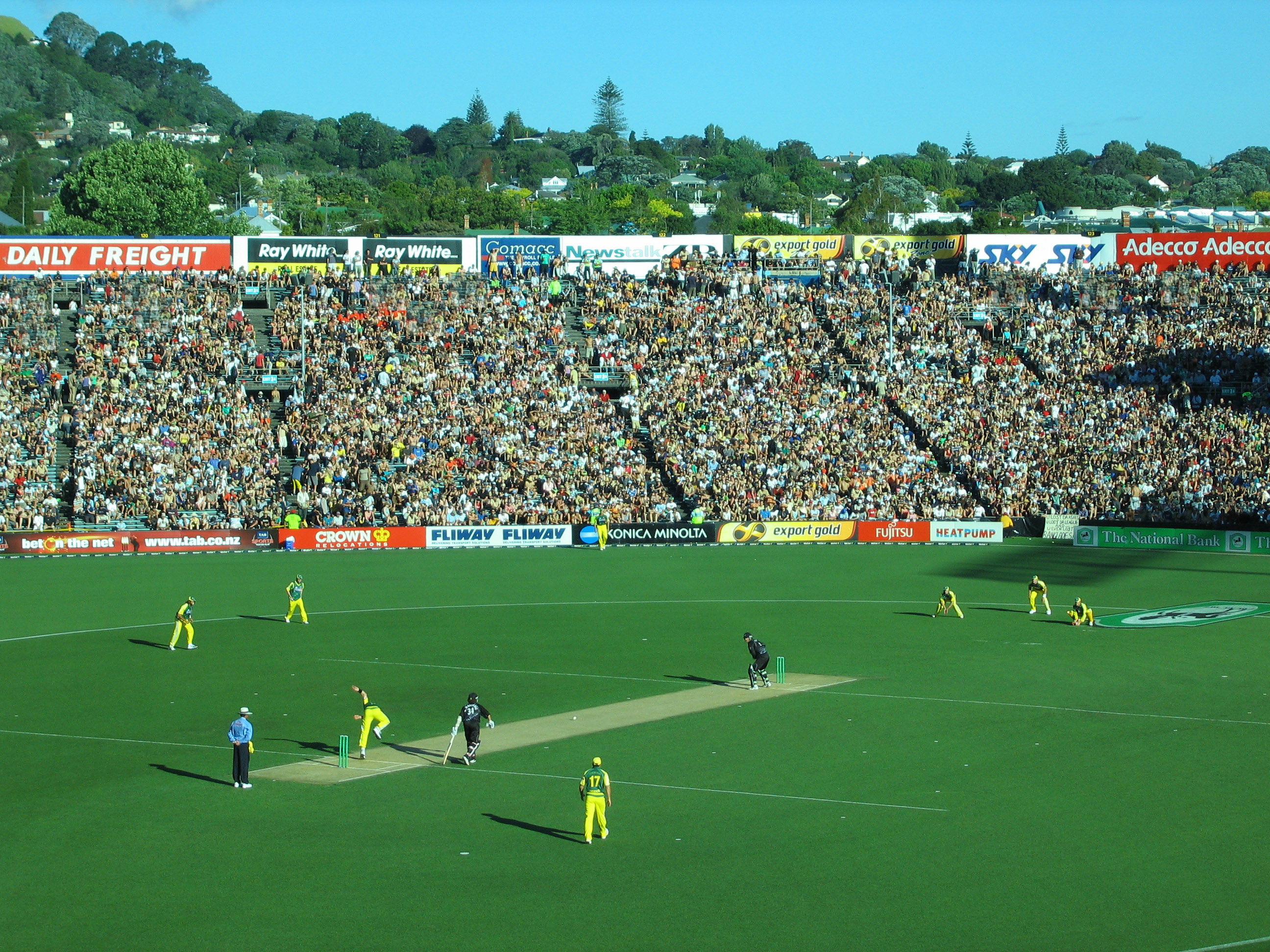
New Zealand v Australia ODI, 2005, before east stand redevelopment

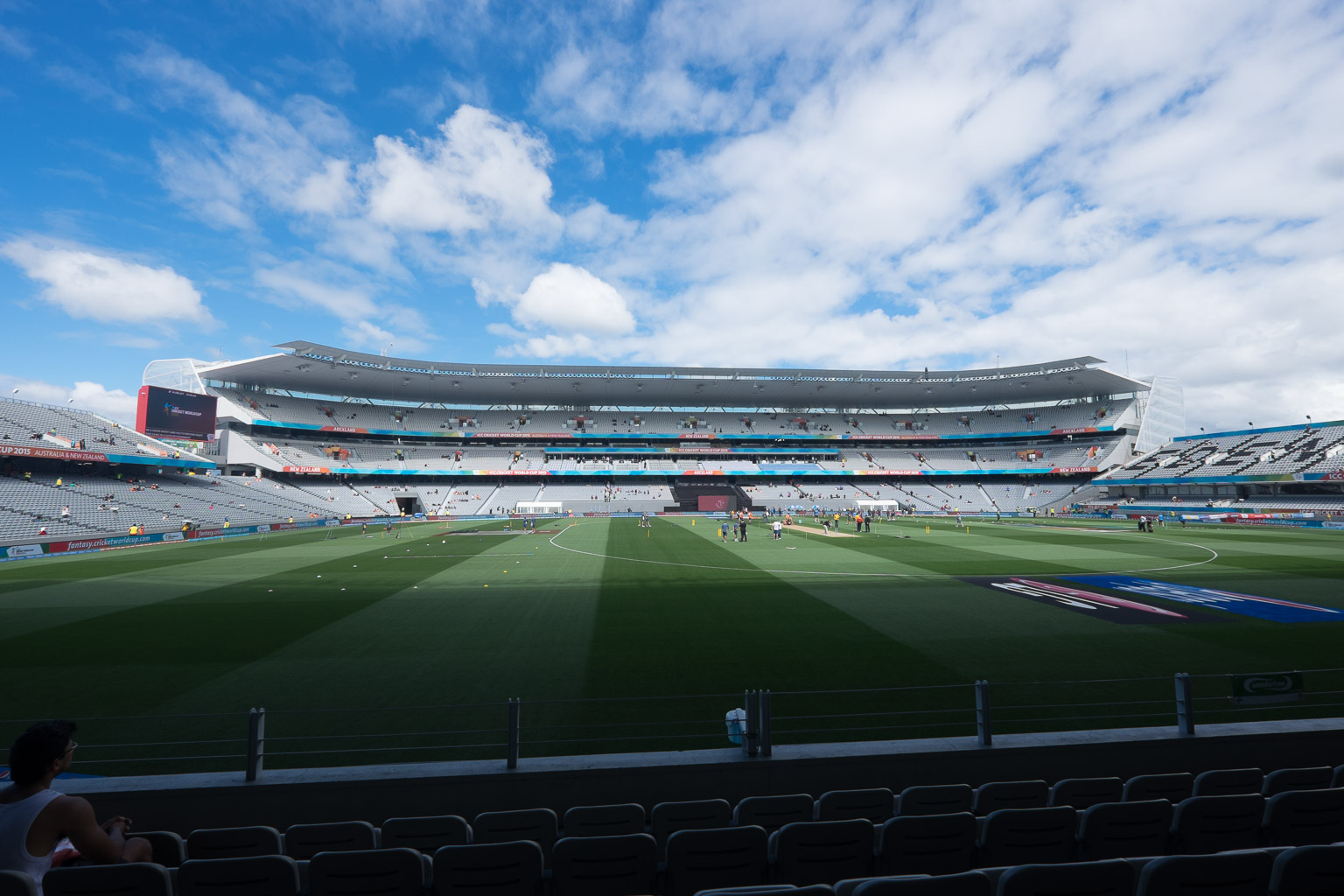
Looking at Eden Park's South Stand from the North Stand, during the warm-up for the 2015 Cricket World Cup semifinal, New Zealand vs South Africa

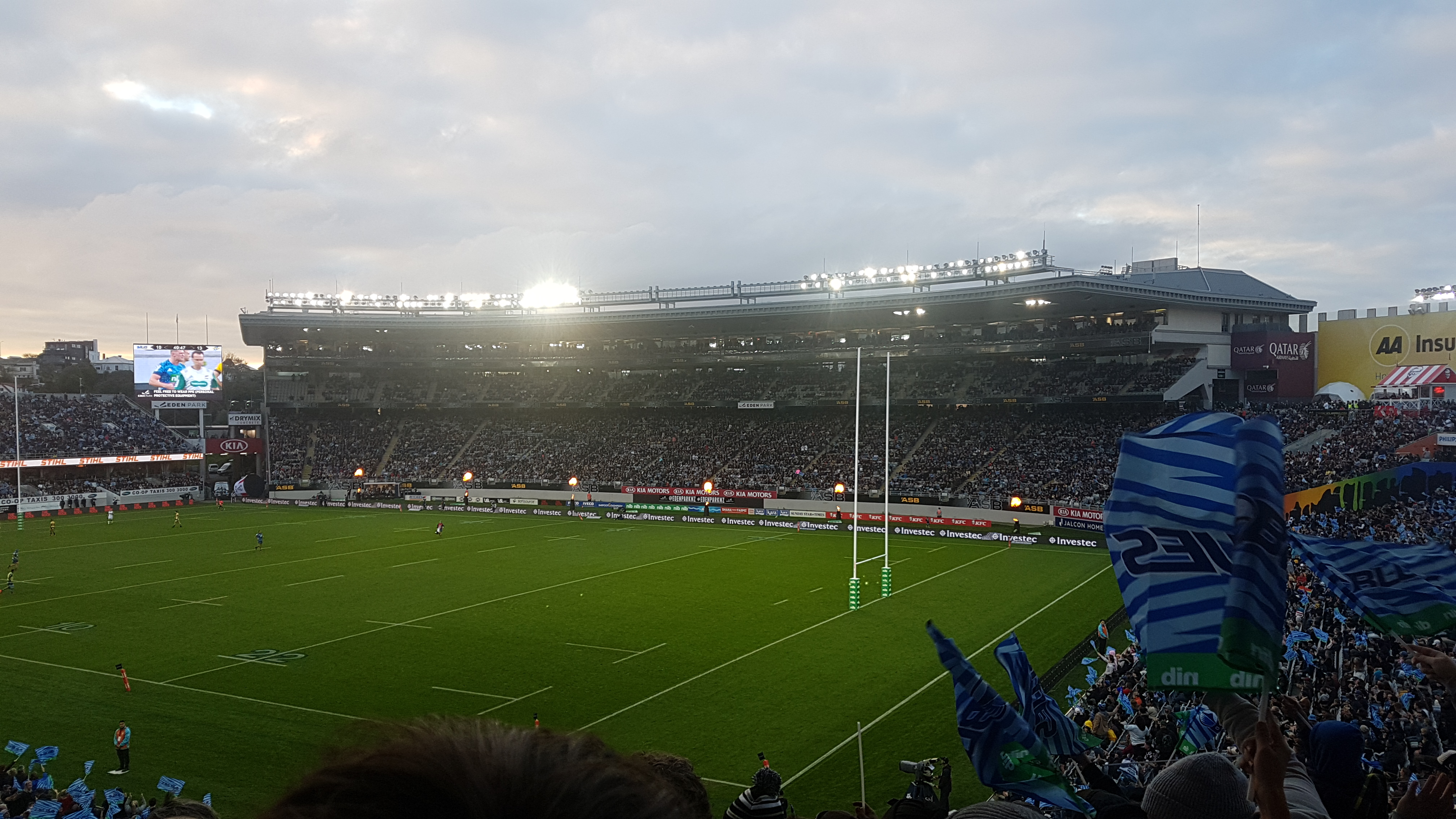
Blues vs Hurricanes 2020

== Rugby league ==
The biggest rugby league game played at Eden Park was the 1988 World Cup final played on 9 October, giving the venue the distinction of hosting the Union and League World Cup finals in consecutive years. This also sees Eden Park (as of 2018) as the only venue to host the World Cup final for both rugby codes. In a spiteful match in which the New Zealand national rugby league team seemed more intent on dishing out punishment than playing football, the Wally Lewis-led Australians defeated the home side 25–12 after leading 25–0 early in the second half. The game was played in front of a record New Zealand rugby league attendance of 47,363 (only 672 less than attended the 1987 Rugby WCF between the All Blacks and France 16 months earlier). Australia had won the right to host the final, but as international crowds in Australia had been dwindling in recent years due to the Kangaroos dominance (only 15,944 had attended the dead rubber Ashes series test between Australia and Great Britain at the Sydney Football Stadium three months earlier), the Australian Rugby League agreed to New Zealand hosting the game in the interests of promoting international rugby league. Their efforts were rewarded with the largest World Cup final attendance since 1968, when 54,290 saw Australia defeat France at the Sydney Cricket Ground.

Eden Park hosted two matches (a double header) in the 2010 Rugby League Four Nations on 6 November. In the early game, England defeated Papua New Guinea 36–10, with Australia defeating New Zealand 34–20 in the second game. The fixture attracted 44,324 fans. The New Zealand Warriors played the Parramatta Eels in their first NRL match at Eden Park to start the 2011 NRL season in front of a crowd of 38,405 with Parramatta winning 24–18. The Warriors played their first home match of the 2012 season against the Manly-Warringah Sea Eagles in a 2011 NRL Grand Final replay, with Manly winning 26–20 in front of 37,502. The 2012 ANZAC Test between Australia and New Zealand was played at Eden Park, with the Kangaroos winning 20–12 in front of 35,399. The Warriors played the Sydney Roosters in Round 2 of the 2013 NRL season, going down 16–14 in front of 32,740.

In 2013 a new faster format of rugby league was announced that it would be held at Eden Park. In 15–16 February 2014, Eden Park held the first ever NRL Auckland Nines tournament.

In 2010, Eden Park hosted its first rugby league internationals since 1988 when it hosted the third round of the 2010 Rugby League Four Nations. In a double header in front of 44,324 fans, England defeated Papua New Guinea 36–10 while Australia defeated New Zealand 34–20.

In 2019 the stadium, upgraded for the 2011 Rugby World Cup, hosted a triple header on 2 November. Two games of the Oceania Cup and the first test of the Baskerville Shield between the touring Great Britain Lions and New Zealand. In front of 25,257, Fiji started off by defeating Samoa 44–18. In the second game, New Zealand won for the first time at Eden Park, defeating Great Britain 12–8. Then came rugby league's biggest international shock for many years when Tonga defeated reigning and then 11 time World Cup champions Australia 16–12. It was the first time a Tier 2 nation had ever beaten the Kangaroos in a test match.

International rugby league returned to Eden Park in 2023 when the Pacific Championships for both Men's and women's played on the same day, but not in a double header. In the women's game New Zealand defeated Tonga 28–10 in front of approximately 10,000 fans. In the later men's game, New Zealand routed 2021 World Cup finalist Samoa 50–0 in front of 23,269.

=== Rugby League Tests and Games (NRL) at Eden Park ===
| Date | Result | Attendance | Notes |
|---|---|---|---|
| 9 October 1988 | Australia def. New Zealand 25–12 | 47,363 | 1985–1988 World Cup Final |
| 6 November 2010 | England def. Papua New Guinea 36–10 | 44,324 | 2010 Four Nations Round 3 |
| 6 November 2010 | Australia def. New Zealand 34–20 | 44,324 | 2010 Four Nations Round 3 |
| 20 April 2012 | Australia def. New Zealand 20–12 | 35,399 | 2012 Anzac Test |
| 2 November 2019 | Fiji def. Samoa 44–18 | 25,257 | 2019 Oceania Cup Group B Game 2 |
| 2 November 2019 | New Zealand def. Great Britain 12–8 | 25,257 | 2019 Baskerville Shield 1st Test |
| 2 November 2019 | Tonga def. Australia 16–12 | 25,257 | 2019 Oceania Cup Group A Game 3 |
| 21 October 2023 | New Zealand def. Tonga 28–10 | ≈10,000 | 2023 Pacific Championships Women's |
| 21 October 2023 | New Zealand def. Samoa 50–0 | 23,269 | 2023 Pacific Championships Men's Game 2 |
| 2 November 2025 | Australia def. New Zealand 10–4 | 19,154 | 2025 Pacific Championships Women's Game 3 |
| 2 November 2025 | New Zealand def. Tonga 40–14 | 38,114 | 2025 Pacific Championships Men's Game 3 |

== Association football ==
Eden Park has hosted four New Zealand men's national team games; friendlies against South Africa and FK Austria Wien in 1947 and 1957 respectively, an Olympic qualifier against Israel for the Seoul Olympics in 1988, and most recently a friendly against the Australian Socceroos in 2022. They were defeated in all four games.

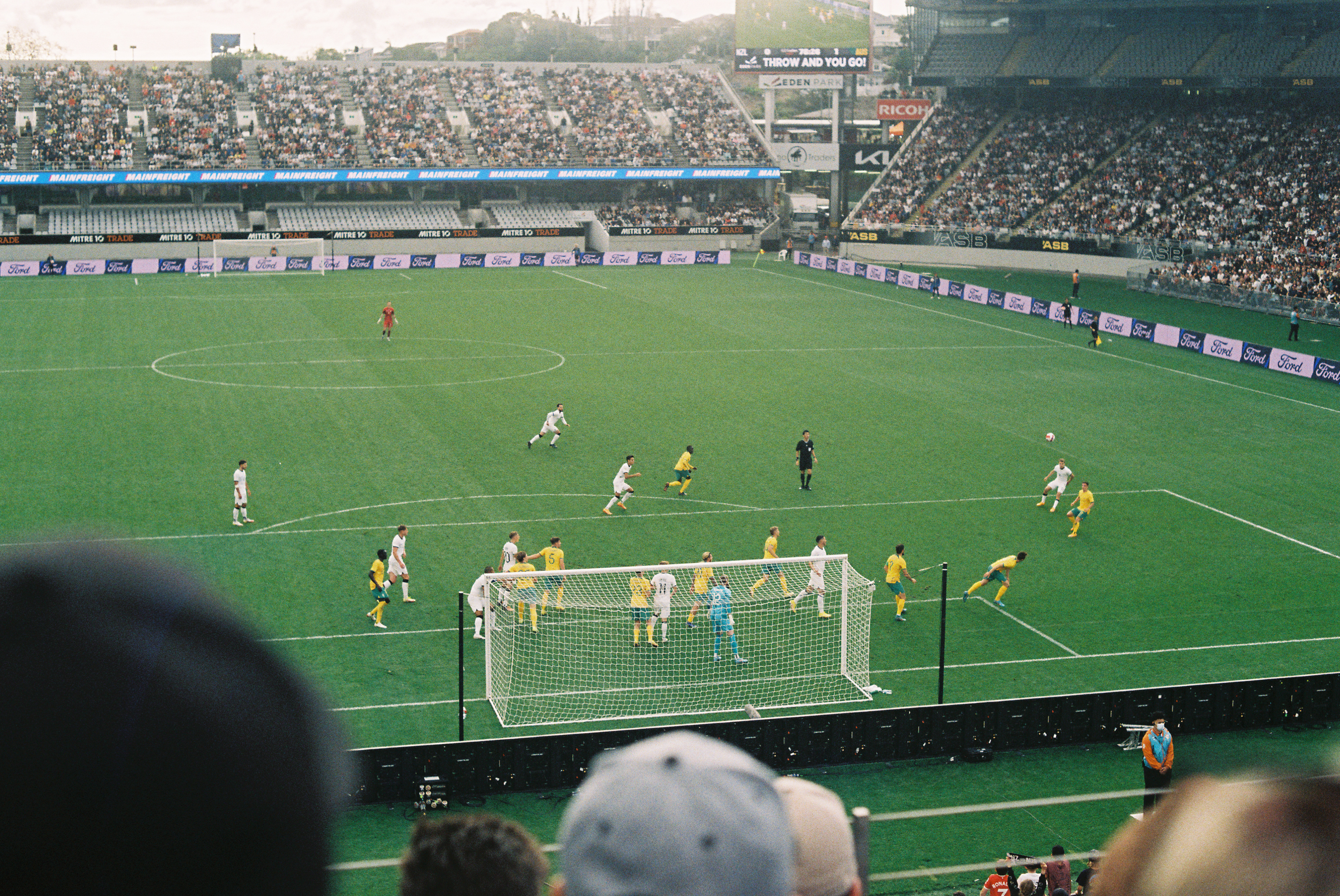
All Whites playing the Socceroos at Eden Park, September 2022

On 19 November 2011, Eden Park hosted its first game of professional club football. The A-League regular season fixture between Wellington Phoenix and Adelaide United resulted in a 1–1 draw. The game attracted 20,078, a new attendance record for the Phoenix. The Phoenix returned to Eden Park on 2 February 2013 against long-distance rivals Perth Glory, drawing a crowd of 11,566 to see them win 1–0.

On 23 July 2014, Eden Park hosted English Premiership team West Ham United F.C. The A-League team Wellington Phoenix defeated West Ham 2–1.

The venue hosted several matches of the 2023 FIFA Women's World Cup including the opening match in which New Zealand beat Norway 1–0. This was the first ever victory for New Zealand at a men's or women's FIFA World Cup and was played in front of a record crowd of 42,137, which was the highest attended football match in New Zealand for men or women.

The attendance record was beaten on 1 August 2023 when 42,958 watched the final Group E game between the United States 0–0 draw against Portugal.

The record was beaten for a third time on 5 August 2023 when 43,217 watched the first Round of 16 knockout match which saw Spain beat Switzerland 5–1.

The fourth highest attendance for a football match attended in New Zealand with 41,107, when the United States beat Vietnam 3–0 in the group stages.

The stadium also hosted the final for OFC qualification for the 2026 FIFA World Cup.

=== 2023 FIFA Women's World Cup Fixtures ===
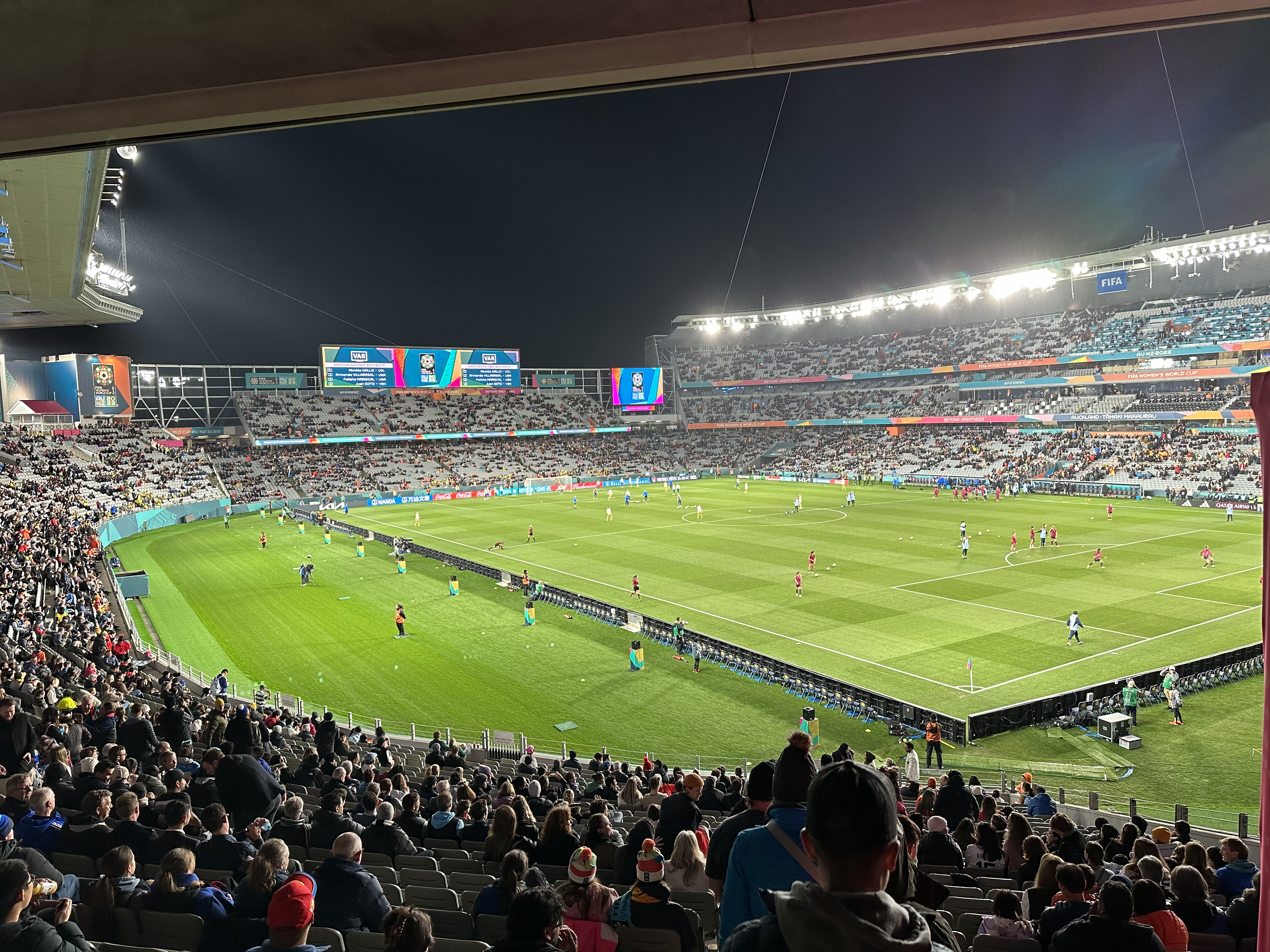
Spain vs Sweden – 2023 FIFA Women's World Cup semifinal

| Date | Team #1 | Res. | Team #2 | Round | Attendance |
|---|---|---|---|---|---|
| 20 July 2023 | New Zealand | 1–0 | Norway | Group A | 42,137 |
| 22 July 2023 | United States | 3–0 | Vietnam | Group E | 41,107 |
| 24 July 2023 | Italy | 1–0 | Argentina | Group G | 30,889 |
| 26 July 2023 | Spain | 5–0 | Zambia | Group C | 20,983 |
| 31 July 2023 | Norway | 6–0 | Philippines | Group A | 34,697 |
| 1 August 2023 | Portugal | 0–0 | United States | Group E | 42,958 |
| 5 August 2023 | Switzerland | 1–5 | Spain | Round of 16 | 43,217 |
| 11 August 2023 | Japan | 1–2 | Sweden | Quarter-finals | 43,217 |
| 15 August 2023 | Spain | 2–1 | Sweden | Semi-finals | 43,217 |

== Outer Oval ==
Eden Park Outer Oval (also known as Eden Park No.2 and, since 2021, "Kennards Hire Community Oval") is a cricket ground on the western side of the main Eden Park ground. It is home to the Auckland Aces cricket team. The ground has a grandstand with seating for around 1,000 spectators, and can accommodate approximately 4,000 spectators overall. Its first first-class cricket match was held in January 1976. As of January 2023 it has staged 135 first-class matches and 124 List A matches. The Old Members Stand at the ground was renamed the Merv Wallace Stand in honour of New Zealand cricketer Merv Wallace.

== See also ==
- 1985–1988 Rugby League World Cup
- 1987 Rugby World Cup
- 1992 Cricket World Cup
- 2011 Rugby World Cup
- 2015 Cricket World Cup
- List of Test cricket grounds

| New sporting event | Rugby World Cup; Final Venue; 1987 | Succeeded by Twickenham Stadium |
| Preceded by Sydney Cricket Ground | Rugby League World Cup; Final Venue; 1988 | Succeeded by Wembley Stadium |
| Preceded by Stade de France | Rugby World Cup; Final Venue; 2011 | Succeeded by Twickenham Stadium |
