= Jordan Meads =

Greece international rugby league footballer

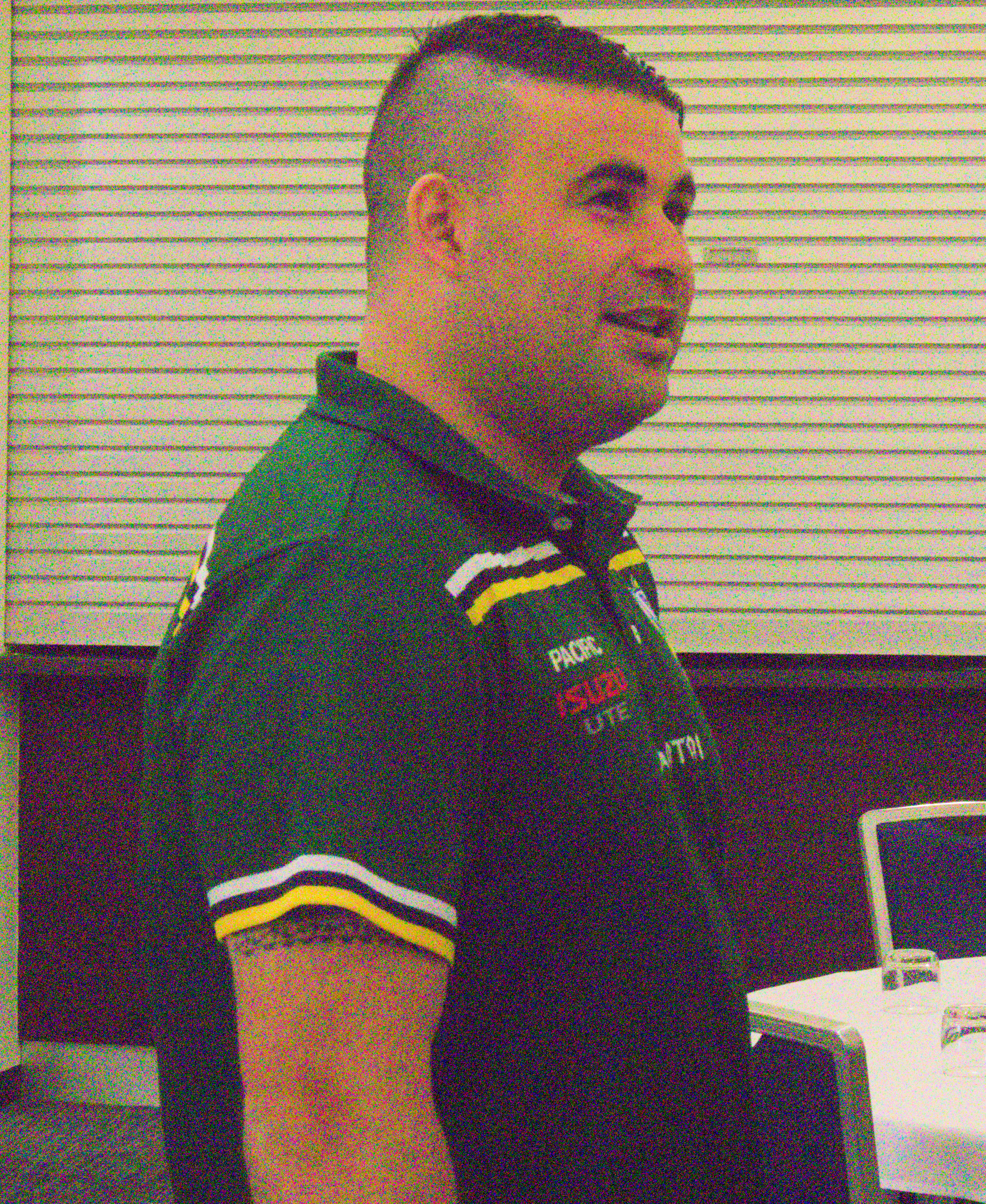

Personal information
- Born: 16 February 1992 (age 33); Wellington City, New Zealand
- Height: 178 cm (5 ft 10 in)
- Weight: 94 kg (14 st 11 lb)

Playing information

Rugby league
- Position: Halfback, Fullback
Club
Years	Team	Pld	T	G	FG	P
2014–15	Newcastle Thunder	22	15	3	0	66
Representative
Years	Team	Pld	T	G	FG	P
2014–	Greece	10	16	34	0	132

Rugby union
Club
Years	Team	Pld	T	G	FG	P
2019–	Sunshine Coast
- Source: As of 30 October 2022

Jordan Meads (born 16 February 1992) is a Greek international rugby league player who currently plays club football with rugby union club University of the Sunshine Barbarians. Primarily playing as a halfback or fullback, Meads previously played professionally and has represented the Greece national team.

== Early life ==
Meads grew up in Wellington, New Zealand, and is of Greek descent on his mother's side. He lived on the Sunshine Coast in Queensland, Australia for a period during his teenage years, attending Mountain Creek State High School and Sunshine Coast Grammar School.

== Career ==
After a stint with the Melbourne Storm, Meads joined the New Zealand Warriors. He is well remembered for his man of the match performance in the 2011 NYC (under 20s) Grand Final against the North Queensland Cowboys, where he kicked the match-winning field goal during golden point extra-time.

Meads left the Warriors in August 2012 to join Sporting Olympique Avignon in the Elite One Championship. He signed with the Sunshine Coast Sea Eagles in the Queensland Cup in January 2013, spending one season there before moving to the Kawana Dolphins in 2014. He joined the League 1 side Gateshead Thunder mid-season in June 2014, scoring 15 tries in 23 matches before leaving the club in July 2015, citing family reasons. Meads subsequently returned to Australia and re-joined Kawana in the Caloundra RSL Cup.

As captain-coach, Meads lead the Beerwah Bulldogs to the 2020 division 1 premiership, the club's first in 41 years.

In 2021 he transferred to rugby union side University of the Sunshine Coast Barbarians with the side going on to win the Sunshine Coast Rugby Union Grand Final.

=== International career ===
Meads writes to his maternal grandparents prior to every game he plays for Greece. He made his international debut in October 2014, scoring 6 tries in their 2014 European Championship C match against the Czech Republic. Meads captained the team during the 2018 European Championship C, and was named in the Greek squad for the 2018 Emerging Nations World Championship, but did not take the field during the tournament. The following year, he captained the team as they qualified for their first ever Rugby League World Cup.
