= 2025 Rugby League European Championships =

Rugby league tournaments

The 2025 Rugby League European Championships was a series of rugby league tournaments for European Rugby League (ERL) men's national teams held in October 2025.

The championships was much reduced in comparison to the cancelled 2023 edition and only the Euro B, Euro C, and Euro D competition played.The 2025 edition saw promotion and relegation between the division, a first for the tournament and something first planned for the COVID-19 affected 2020 tournament.

The structure of the tournament was announced in March, with final fixture confirmation coming in September. In restarting the tournament after two mostly cancelled editions, the ERL invited nations after a consultation period and seeded them based on rank.

The competition saw each team play one home and one away game. However, Euro C will be played in a centralised location as Ukraine were unable to host a match due to the current Russo-Ukrainian war.

Euro A is set to be reintegrated in 2027, in addition to further nations be added lower down if eligible.

== Euro B ==
2025 European Championship B
- Number of teams: 3
- Winner: Serbia
- Matches played: 3

Pos	Team	Pld	W	D	L	PF	PA	PD	Pts	Qualification
1	Serbia	2	2	0	0	82	16	+66	4	
2	Netherlands	2	1	0	1	40	36	+4	2	
3	Malta	2	0	0	2	18	88	−70	0	Relegated to Euro C

Updated to match(es) played on 25 October 2025. Source:

18 October 2025
13:30 CEST (UTC+02:00)

Malta	6–36	Netherlands
Tries: Dimech 23'; Goals: Gauci (1/1)	Report	Tries: Geevers 16'; Schoenmaker (2) 20', 40'; Van Der Berg 32'; Koolstra 47'; Roeleveld 65'; Wragg 79'; Goals: Koolstra (4/7)

Marsa Sports Complex, Marsa
Referee: Mickael Lannes (France)

Team details
Malta		Position	Netherlands
Name	Number	Position	Number	Name
Zarrin Galea	1	FB	1	Lachlan Van Der Vliet
Jean Scholey	2	WG	2	Hamish Wragg
Brendan Dalton	3	CE	3	Joran Schoenmaker
Harrison Jewitt	4	CE	4	Hidde Van Der Berg
Kane Tippett	5	WG	5	Dimitri Harringa
Xavier Mamo	6	SO	6	Laury Renac
Kyle Gauci	7	SH	7	Damon Koolstra
Josh Cassar	8	PR	8	Kwinten Roeleveld
Karl Cassar	9	HK	9	Maas Van Der Reek
Jean-Pierre Zarb	10	PF	10	Kevin Ebing
Mark Roberston	11	SR	11	Mavi Geevers
Justin Davenport	12	SR	12	Paul Kuijpers
Kaine Dimech	13	LF	13	Tom Van Bokhoven
Shaun Chircop	14	IN	14	Rik Boats
Terence Galdes	15	IN	15	Sam Kulmpert
Nicky Maylor	16	IN	16	Francis Appleton
Marcus Christians	17	IN	17	Tom Turnock
Philip Humphrey		Coach		Dave Hunter

25 October 2025
17:30 CEST (UTC+02:00)

Netherlands	4–30	Serbia
Tries: Koolstra 34'; Goals: Koolstra (0/1)	Report	Tries: Marjanovic (4) 7', 45', 77' 80'; Trifunovic 18'; Muranka 72'; Goals: Jasari (0/1); Soric (0/1); Ditchman (1/4); Stojilkovic (0/1)

RC Oysters, Oisterwijk
Referee: Stephane Vincent (France)

Team details
Netherlands		Position	Serbia
Name	Number	Position	Number	Name
Lachlan Van Der Vliet	1	FB	1	Jesse Soric
Arie-Tjerk Razoux Schultz	2	WG	2	Andrej Marinkovic
Kees Kuijpers	3	CE	3	Stefan Arsic
Joran Schoenmaker	4	CE	4	Vladimir Milutinovic
Dimitri Harringa	5	WG	5	Dzavid Jasari
Laury Renac	6	SO	6	Niko Djukic
Damon Koolstra	7	SH	7	Vlado Kusic
Mauricio Gomez Pazos	8	PR	8	Vladica Nikolic
Maas Van Der Reek	9	HK	9	Sasha Popovic
Kwinten Roeleveld	10	PF	10	Vladica Nikolic
Sam Kulmpert	11	SR	11	Enis Bibic
Mavi Gevers	12	SR	12	Jason Muranka
Paul Kuijpers	13	LF	13	Lachlan Ditchman
Lars Mudde	14	IN	14	Vuk Štrbac
Tom Turnock	15	IN	15	Djordje Krnjeta
Sylvan Vonken	16	IN	16	Rajko Trifunovic
Joshua Pengel	17	IN	17	Strahinja Stojilkovic
Ruben Stuifzand	18	CS	18	Aleksandar Pavlovic
Dave Hunter		Coach		Darren Fisher

1 November 2025
13:00 CET (UTC+01:00)

Serbia	52–12	Malta
Tries: Marinkovic (2) 8', 40', Djuric (2) 32', 58', Pavlovic 54'; Soric 61'; Muranka 64'; Arsic 71'; Nikolic 78'; Zenuni 80'; Goals: Soric (0/1); Nikolic (1/1); Jasari (5/8)	Report	Tries: Gatt 26'; Jewitt 50'; Goals: Gauci (2/2)

FK BSK Borča, Belgrade

== Euro C ==
Euro C was won by Ukraine who won both games to secure promotion to Euro B. Italy were relegated to Euro D.

2025 European Championship C
- Number of teams: 3
- Host country: Italy
- Winner: Ukraine
- Matches played: 3
- Points scored: 154 (51.33 per match)
- Tries scored: 30 (10 per match)
- Top scorer: (Greece) Tyrone Tsagalias 24pts
- Top try scorer: (Greece) Tyrone Tsagalias 3

Pos	Team	Pld	W	D	L	PF	PA	PD	Pts	Qualification
1	Ukraine	2	2	0	0	78	26	+52	4	Promoted to Euro B
2	Greece	2	1	0	1	42	48	−6	2	
3	Italy	2	0	0	2	34	80	−46	0	Relegated to Euro D

18 October 2025
15:00 CEST (UTC+02:00)

Italy	20–44	Ukraine
Tries: Plati 4'; Piccirilli 24'; Lenzo 74'; Goals: Corte (4/4)	Report	Tries: Vedler (2) 12', 67'; Cleary 17'; Y Hromow 31'; Zazimko (2) 48', 59'; O Hromow 78'; Sciglitano 80'; Goals: Scorbach (5/5), Cleary (1/4)

Pasian di Prato stadium, Udine
Referee: Enzo Peyre (France)

Team details
Italy		Position	Ukraine
Name	Number	Position	Number	Name
Jack Piccirilli	1	FB	1	Yuri Hromow
Emanuele Passera	2	WG	2	David Zazimko
George Stamatatos	3	CE	3	Mykhailo Troian
Andrea Gallinaro	4	CE	4	Liubomyr Beznoschuk
Jackson Lenzo	5	WG	5	Danylo Vedler
Alessandro Corte	6	SO	6	Oleksandr Scorbach
Damian Nati	7	SH	7	Jett Cleary
Davide Colla	8	PR	8	Rhys Sciglitano
Lorenzo Vizzolo	9	HK	9	Owen Hromow
Dominic Biondi	10	PF	10	Volodimir Karpenko
Leonard Plati	11	SR	11	Jonah Ngaronoa
Ikenna Michele Ugwo	12	SR	12	Oleksandr Fomiuk
Nicholas Lenaz	13	LF	13	Victor Tereszko
Francesco Vallone	14	IN	14	Daniel Janissen
Mattia Saoncella	15	IN	15	Dmytro Pokotylo
Ryan Solda	16	IN	16	Ostap Hryshchenko
Francesco Speggiorn	17	IN	17	Ostap Kozak
Leo Epifania		Coach		Dan Beardshaw

22 October 2025
15:00 CEST (UTC+02:00)

Greece	6–34	Ukraine
Tries: Tsagalias 10'; Goals: Tsagalias (1/1)	Report	Tries: Ngaronoa 5'; O Hromow 15'; Sluvinsky 29'; Tereszko 37'; Y Hromow 69'; Popliuk 74'; Goals: Skorbach (4/5), Cleary (1/1)

Pasian di Prato stadium, Udine
Referee: Enzo Peyre (France)

Team details
Greece		Position	Ukraine
Name	Number	Position	Number	Name
Tyrone Tsagalias	1	FB	1	Yuri Hromow
Alexandros Aliu	2	WG	2	Davyd Zazimko
Nick Mougios	3	CE	3	Zayn Sluvinsky
Kostas Katsidonis	4	CE	4	Liubomyr Beznoshchuk
Georgios Chionis	5	WG	5	Danylo Vedler
Leon Bakis	6	SO	6	Oleksandr Skorbach
Eddie Markopoulos	7	SH	7	Jett Cleary
Stephanos Bastas	8	PR	8	Ostap Hryshchenko
Deon Iro	9	HK	9	Owen Hromow
Theodoros Nianiakas	10	PF	10	Volodymyr Karpenko
Aris Koulizakis	11	SR	11	Jonah Ngaronoa
Chris Slater-Raptis	12	SR	12	Oleksandr Fomiuk
Bill Magoulias	13	LF	13	Victor Tereszko
Stephanos Eskioglou	14	IN	14	Daniel Janissen
Panteleimon Tsattalios	15	IN	15	Ostap Kozak
Nikolaos Stefanou	16	IN	16	Dmytro Pokotylo
Aris Dardamanis	17	IN	17	Valerii Popeliuk
Steve Georgallis		Coach		Dan Beardshaw

25 October 2025
15:00 CEST (UTC+02:00)

Italy	14–36	Greece
Tries: Lenaz 2'; Piccirilli 47'; Stamatatos 55'; Goals: Corte (1/3)	Report	Tries: Iro 6'; Linoxylakis 14'; Mougios 18'; Tsagalias (2) 27', 76'; Chionis 62'; Bakis 73'; Markopoulos (2) 33', 52 Goals: Tsagalias (5/9)

Pasian di Prato stadium, Udine
Referee: Enzo Peyre (France)

Team details
Italy		Position	Greece
Name	Number	Position	Number	Name
Jack Piccirilli	1	FB	1	Tyrone Tsagalias
Alessandro Corte	2	WG	2	Alexandros Linoxylakis
Emanuele Passera	3	CE	3	Nick Mougios
Ikenna Michele Ugwo	4	CE	4	Kostas Katsidonis
Ryan Solda	5	WG	5	George Chionis
Jackson Lenzo	6	SO	6	Leon Bakis
Damian Nati	7	SH	7	Eddie Markopoulos
Davide Colla	8	PR	8	Myles Gal
Nicolas Lenaz	9	HK	9	Deon Iro
Dominic Biondi	10	PF	10	Theodoros Nianiakas
George Stamatatos	11	SR	11	Alexandros Aliu
Francesco Speggiorin	12	SR	12	Stefanos Eskioglou
Leonard Plati	13	LF	13	Nicholas Flocas
Mattia Saoncella	14	IN	14	Nikolaos Stefanou
Vincent Fochesato	15	IN	15	Panteliemon Tsattalios
Lorenzo Vizzolo	16	IN	16	Stefanos Bastas
Antonio Obasi	17	IN	17	Aris Koulizakis
Andrea Marchica	18	CS	18	Aris Dardamanis
Leo Epifania		Coach		Steve Georgallis

== Euro D ==
Germany won Euro D and promotion to Euro C.

2025 European Championship D
- Number of teams: 3
- Winner: Germany
- Matches played: 3
- Points scored: 224 (74.67 per match)
- Tries scored: 39 (13 per match)
- Top scorer: (Germany) Brad Billsborough 40 pts
- Top try scorer: (Norway) Nils Holte, Jymaal Mellor-King 4

Pos	Team	Pld	W	D	L	PF	PA	PD	Pts	Qualification
1	Germany	2	2	0	0	104	28	+76	4	Promoted to Euro C
2	Norway	2	1	0	1	104	38	+66	2	
3	Czech Republic	2	0	0	2	16	158	−142	0	

11 October 2025
14:00 CEST (UTC+02:00)

Norway	86–6	Czech Republic
Tries: Gradert (2) 10', 63'; Mellor-King (3) 13', 57', 60'; Holte (4) 18', 23', 30', 79'; Sagelv 26'; Henriksen (2) 37' 70'; Grindheim 41'; Milligan 67'; Pride 76'; Goals: Mellor-King (2/4); Grindheim (11/11)	1st: 38–6; 2nd: 48–0; Report	Tries: Zámrský 39'; Goals: Cintler (1/1)

Strømmen Stadion, Oslo
Referee: Michael Smaill (New Zealand)

Team details
Norway		Position	Czech Republic
Name	Number	Position	Number	Name
Jakob Øftshus Henriksen	1	FB	1	Roman Richtr
Magnus Lima Soiland	2	WG	2	Tomáš Kasík
Kristoffer Gradert	3	CE	3	Matej Schejbal
Fredrik Skovly	4	CE	4	Josef Brynda
Denis Galic	5	WG	5	Jiri Brynda
Kristoffer Milligan	6	SO	6	Ladislav Cintler
Jymaal Mellor-King	7	SH	7	Daniel Veselý
Mike Pride	8	PR	8	Krystof Pecold
Emil Grindheim	9	HK	9	Tomáš Řičica
Nils Kristian Holte	10	PF	10	Tomáš Adamec
Isuf Peci	11	SR	11	Jakub Denko
Marius Odland Sagelv	12	SR	12	Vit Studecky
Isaac R. Schmidt	13	LF	13	David Bělohlávek
Oliver Falk	14	IN	14	David Slivka
Tygve Hansen	15	IN	15	Jan Zámrský
Eric Mellor	16	IN	16	Adam Mikulas
Sander Milligan	17	IN	17	Tobias Marek
Isaac Schmidt		Coach		Jakub Hudrlík

18 October 2025
13:00 CEST (UTC+02:00)

Czech Republic	10–72	Germany
Tries: Zámrský 15'; Studentlky 70'; Goals: Cintler (1/2)	Report	Tries: Doughton 7'; Schomberg (2) 24', 68'; Smith (2) 29', 75'; McConnell (2) 31', 40'; Wood 36'; Kramer (3) 42', 56', 80'; Ritz-Rahmen 60'; Goals: Billsborough (12/12)

Stadion HZS, Hradec Králové
Referee: Misa Vakadranu (Fiji)

Team details
Czech Republic		Position	Germany
Name	Number	Position	Number	Name
David Stastnik	1	FB	1	George Wood
Roman Richtr	2	WG	2	Fabian Kramer
Tomáš Kasík	3	CE	3	Martin Tormann
Krystof Pecold	4	CE	4	Benedikt Esser
Filip-Daniel Kittl	5	WG	5	Will Hoffmeister
Daniel Veselý	6	SO	6	Liam Doughton
Jakub Hrdlick	7	SH	7	Brad Billsborough
Jan Zámrský	8	PR	8	Mawuli Amefia
Ladislav Cintler	9	HK	9	Harry Cartwright
Tobias Marek	10	PF	10	Dany Doukeng
Vit Studentlky	11	SR	11	Shaun Smith
David Bělohlávek	12	SR	12	Eoin Bowie
Tomas Adamec	13	LF	13	Josh McConnell
Jaroslav Novotny	14	IN	14	Jimmy Adams
Martin Nasticky	15	IN	15	Alex Nyahoe
Josef Brynda	16	IN	16	Angus Ritz-Rahmen
Matej Schejbal	17	IN	17	Hagen Schomberg
Jakub Hudrlík		Coach		Andy Hay

25 October 2025
14:00 CEST (UTC+02:00)

Germany	32–18	Norway
Tries: Billsborough 4'; Kurz 6'; Tetley 18', Rau 50'; McConnell 61'; Goals: Billsborough (6/7)	Report	Tries: Hansen 18'; Mellor-King 54'; Milligan 70'; Gradert 79'; Goals: Mellor-King (1/3); Grindheim (0/1)

Sportplatz Welper, Hattingen
Referee: Hans Verveer (Netherlands)

Team details
Germany		Position	Norway
Name	Number	Position	Number	Name
Jimmy Adams	1	FB	1	Magnus Lima Soiland
Fabian Kramer	2	WG	2	Denis Galic
Fabian Wendt	3	CE	3	Kristoffer Gradert
Felix Rau	4	CE	4	Fredrik Skovly
Linus Kurz	5	WG	5	Trygve Hansen
Liam Doughton	6	SO	6	Kristoffer Milligan
Brad Billsborough	7	SH	7	Jymaal Mellor-King
Mawuli Amefia	8	PR	8	Marius Odland Sagelv
Harry Cartwright	9	HK	9	Emil Grindheim
Hagen Schomberg	10	PF	10	Nils Kristian Holte
Eoin Bowie	11	SR	11	Matt South
Shaun Smith	12	SR	12	Isuf Peci
Josh McConnell	13	LF	13	Isaac R. Schmidt
Alex Nyahoe	14	IN	14	Sander Milligan
Dany Doukeng Kongmo Ngo	15	IN	15	Eric Mellor
Martin Apostel	16	IN	16	William Giddings
Charlie Tetley	17	IN	17	Sveinung Fludal
Benedikt Esser	18	CS	18	Idar Kjaerstad
Andy Hay		Coach		Isaac Schmidt
