= 2020 Oceania Cup (rugby league) =

- Number of teams: 6
- Host countries: Australia; New Zealand

The 2020 Oceania Cup was to be the second edition of the Oceania Cup. The competition was scheduled to begin in June and conclude in November, but has since been cancelled due to the COVID-19 pandemic.

The competition would have split six competing nations into two tiered pools. Pool A would have consisted of New Zealand, Tonga, and Fiji, who earned promotion by winning Pool B in 2019, and replaced Australia, who were scheduled to tour the Northern Hemisphere. The Cook Islands were to join Pool B for the first time, alongside Papua New Guinea and Samoa.

== Fixtures ==
A schedule was announced in February, though venues and dates were unconfirmed due to the COVID-19 pandemic. On 20 March, it was announced that the June doubleheader had been postponed. In May, the NRL announced that the 2020 NRL Grand Final would be played on 25 October, which further delayed the Oceania Cup. It was eventually cancelled on 4 September 2020.

=== Pool A ===
| Team | Pld | W | D | L | PF | PA | +/− | Pts |
|---|---|---|---|---|---|---|---|---|
| Fiji | 0 | 0 | 0 | 0 | 0 | 0 | 0 | 0 |
| New Zealand | 0 | 0 | 0 | 0 | 0 | 0 | 0 | 0 |
| Tonga | 0 | 0 | 0 | 0 | 0 | 0 | 0 | 0 |

20 June 2020

| Tonga | Cancelled | New Zealand |

17 October 2020

| Fiji | Cancelled | Tonga |

24 October 2020

| New Zealand | Cancelled | Fiji |

=== Pool B ===
| Team | Pld | W | D | L | PF | PA | +/− | Pts |
|---|---|---|---|---|---|---|---|---|
| Cook Islands | 0 | 0 | 0 | 0 | 0 | 0 | 0 | 0 |
| Papua New Guinea | 0 | 0 | 0 | 0 | 0 | 0 | 0 | 0 |
| Samoa | 0 | 0 | 0 | 0 | 0 | 0 | 0 | 0 |

20 June 2020

| Samoa | Cancelled | Cook Islands |

17 October 2020

| Papua New Guinea | Cancelled | Samoa |

24 October 2020

| Cook Islands | Cancelled | Papua New Guinea |

== See also ==
- International rugby league in 2020
- Impact of the COVID-19 pandemic on rugby league
