= Rugby League Pacific Championships =

International rugby league tournament

- Current season or competition: 2025 Rugby League Pacific Championships
- Sport: Rugby league
- Instituted: 2019
- Inaugural season: 2019
- Number of teams: 7
- Region: Oceania (APRL)
- Holders: New Zealand (Men's); Australia (Women's) (2025)
- Most titles: Australia/New Zealand (Men's; 2 titles); Australia (Women's; 2 titles)
- Broadcast partner: Nine Network; Fox League; Sky Sport
- Related competition: Pacific Cup

The Rugby League Pacific Championship is a rugby league tournament for national teams based in the Oceania region. Its inaugural tournament was in 2019 as the "Oceania Cup".

The tournament replaced the Anzac Test Series (1997–2017), which solely featured Australia and New Zealand as a single match annual test. Before the Pacific Championships, regular regional competition between the other Oceanian countries was sporadic since the cessation of the Pacific Cup (1974–2009) which served as a development competition for the Pacific Islands.

== History ==
The tournament was created in 2019 as the Oceania Cup with a two tiered format. The top tier (cup) consisted of Australia, New Zealand and Tonga and the second tier (shield) consisted of Fiji, Samoa and Papua New Guinea. Australia won the Cup in the inaugural season while Fiji won the shield and got promoted for the 2020 competition.

For the 2020 edition, Cook Islands were scheduled to take Fiji's place in the shield. No team was relegated from the cup as Australia were going to go on a tour of England that year. The competition was scheduled to begin in June and conclude in November, but was cancelled due to the COVID-19 pandemic.

The tournament returned in 2023, following the pandemic and postponed 2021 Rugby League World Cup, under the name Pacific Championships. The tournament came as part of a $7 million investment by the NRL and Australian Government to develop rugby league in the surrounding countries, in addition to forming part of the International Rugby League new seven year international calendar.

2024 saw the introduction of the women's competition. Women's games were held in 2023, but as a series of friendlies and in no structured competition. The 2024 Women's Bowl also acted as the Asia-Pacific qualification tournament for the 2026 Women's Rugby League World Cup. For 2024 onwards, promotion and relegation would not be automatic and would occur via a playoff. 2024 saw Australia win both men's and women's competition. The promotion and relegation playoff was scrapped for 2025 a year after it was introduced, the competitions were won by New Zealand and Australia for the men's and women's tournament respectively.

== Format ==
The Pacific Rugby League Championship is a competition for men's national teams of the seven full member of International Rugby League (IRL) located in Oceania:

- Australia
- Cook Islands (Note: The Cook Islands did not participate in the inaugural 2019 edition)
- Fiji
- New Zealand
- Papua New Guinea
- Samoa
- Tonga

The tournament currently is divided into two divisions of three teams initially based on IRL rankings. Since 2024, a promotion and relegation playoff has occurred between the bottom placed team in the first division and the top placed team in the second division. The seventh Oceanian team tours a European Rugby League nation on a rotational basis.

Each team plays two matches in a single round robin with the top two of division one advancing to the division final.

The women's competition, introduced in 2024, followed a very similar format and similarly is for women's national teams of the Oceanian IRL full members:

- Australia
- Cook Islands
- Fiji
- New Zealand
- Papua New Guinea
- Samoa
- Tonga

Like the men's, the tournament is divided into two divisions. Though, unlike the men's, the lower tier contains four teams as no regular touring schedule has been planned for the women's sides.

== Men's Tournaments ==
Cup				Bowl				Team on Tour
Year	Champions	Runners-up	Third place	Year	Champions	Runners-up	Third place	Team on Tour
(Australia) (New Zealand); 2019	Australia	New Zealand	Tonga	(Australia) (New Zealand); 2019	Fiji (Promoted)	Samoa	Papua New Guinea	None (Note: New Zealand and Papua New Guinea hosted a tour by Great Britain in which Tonga also played, however all teams still participated in the 2019 Oceania Cup.)
(Australia) (New Zealand); 2020	Cancelled: (Note: Cancelled due to the COVID-19 pandemic); New Zealand, Tonga, and Fiji (R)			(Australia) (New Zealand); 2020	Cancelled: Samoa (P), Papua New Guinea, and Cook Islands			(Australia) Kangaroo tour of England
2021–2022: No tournament due to the 2021 Rugby League World Cup (held in 2022)
(Australia) (New Zealand); 2023	New Zealand	Australia	Samoa	(Papua New Guinea); 2023	Papua New Guinea	Fiji	Cook Islands	Tonga tour of England
(Australia) (New Zealand); 2024	Australia	Tonga	New Zealand	(Fiji) (Papua New Guinea); 2024	Papua New Guinea	Fiji	Cook Islands	Samoa tour of England (Note: It was expected that Samoa would also play in the Pacific Championships having reduced the length of their tour from three games to two. However, following an announcement from New Zealand Rugby League regarding the tournament, Samoa was omitted from the fixture list.)
(Australia) (New Zealand) 2025	New Zealand	Samoa	Tonga	(Papua New Guinea) 2025	Papua New Guinea	Fiji	Cook Islands	(Australia) Kangaroo tour of England
2026: No tournament due to the 2026 Rugby League World Cup

Promotion and relegation anomalies

- 2019/20: Tonga avoided relegation as Australia would were scheduled to tour England the following year freeing up an additional space in the 2020 tournament.
- 2020/23: Following the tournament's rebrand as the Pacific Championships and the extended time between editions due to the COVID-19 pandemic and the delayed 2021 World Cup, previous promotions and relegations were nullified and teams were reseeded based on rank.
- 2023/24: No relegation was planned between the 2023 and 2024 edition with Tonga and Samoa touring England in these respective years. Tonga who did not participate in 2023 replaced Samoa who did not participate in 2024.
- 2025/27: None occurred

=== Results by team ===
Team / Year	2019	2023	2024	2025
Australia	1st	2nd	1st	Tour
Cook Islands	DNP	6th	6th	6th
Fiji	4th	5th	5th	5th
New Zealand	2nd	1st	3rd	1st
Papua New Guinea	6th	4th	4th	4th
Samoa	5th	3rd	Tour	2nd
Tonga	3rd	Tour	2nd	3rd

2024–present promotion/relegation playoff winners

- 2024: New Zealand (cup team)

== Women's Tournaments ==
Cup				Bowl					Team on Tour
Year	Champions	Runners-up	Third place	Year	Champions	Runners-up	Third place	Fourth place	Team on Tour
(Australia) (New Zealand) (Papua New Guinea); 2024	Australia	New Zealand	Papua New Guinea (Relegated)	(Fiji) (New Zealand); 2024	Samoa (Promoted)	Fiji	Cook Islands and Tonga		None
(Australia) (New Zealand) 2025	Australia	New Zealand	Samoa	(Papua New Guinea) 2025	Cook Islands	Tonga	Papua New Guinea	—N/a	Fiji at the World Series
2026: No tournament due to the 2026 Rugby League World Cup

Promotion and relegation anomalies

- 2025/27: None occurred

=== Results by team ===
Team / Year	2024	2025
Australia	1st	1st
Cook Islands	=6th	4th
Fiji	5th	WCQ
New Zealand	2nd	2nd
Papua New Guinea	3rd	6th
Samoa	4th	3rd
Tonga	=6th	5th

Promotion/relegation playoff winners

- 2024: Samoa (bowl team)
