= 1970 New Zealand Royal Visit Honours =

Appointments by Elizabeth II

1970 Royal Visit Honours
- Previous: 1970 New Year Honours; Next: 1970 gallantry awards
- Type: New Zealand royal honours: Royal Victorian Order
- Date: 21–26 March 1970
- Country: New Zealand
- Total recipients: 17

The 1970 New Zealand Royal Visit Honours were appointments by Elizabeth II to the Royal Victorian Order, to mark her visit to New Zealand that year. The Queen was accompanied by the Prince of Wales (now Charles III) and Princess Anne on the tour, and attended celebrations connected with the bicentenary of Captain James Cook's first voyage to New Zealand. The honours were announced on 21 and 26 March 1970.

The recipients of honours are listed here as they were styled before their new honour.

== Royal Victorian Order ==
=== Knight Grand Cross (GCVO) ===
- Sir Arthur Espie Porritt Bt GCMG KCVO CBE – governor-general of New Zealand
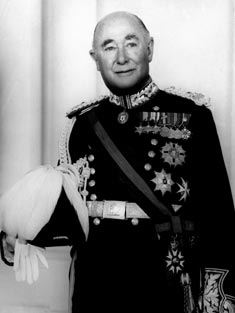
Lord Porritt

=== Commander (CVO) ===
- Patrick Jerad O'Dea MVO – of Lower Hutt
- Commissioner George Colin Urquhart BEM QPM – of Wellington
- David Claverly Williams – of Wellington

=== Member, fourth class (MVO) ===
- Bryan David Crompton – of Days Bay
- Colonel Henry Noel Hoare – of Wellington
- Eric Mark Horan – of Lower Hutt
- Douglas Alexander Johnston MVO – of Wellington
- Peter John Hope Purvis MVO BEM – of York Bay
- Squadron Leader Geoffrey Wallingford AFC – Royal New Zealand Air Force; of Wellington

In 1984, Members of the Royal Victorian Order, fourth class, were redesignated as Lieutenants of the Royal Victorian Order (LVO).

=== Member, fifth class (MVO) ===
- Chief Superintendent George Claridge – New Zealand Police; of Wellington
- Squadron Leader Daniel John Cotton AFC – Royal New Zealand Air Force; of Raumati Beach
- Desmond James Cummings – of Wellington
- Walter James Wynn Williams – of Upper Hutt
- Francis Eamonn Wilson – of Lower Hutt

== Royal Victorian Medal ==
=== Bar to the Royal Victorian Medal (Silver) (RVM) ===
- Harold Eugene Symonds RVM – of Lower Hutt

=== Silver (RVM) ===
- Detective Senior Sergeant Bruce Fergus Scott – of Auckland
