= 2014 Rugby League European Championship C =

2014 European Championship C
- Number of teams: 3
- Winner: Greece (1st title)
- Matches played: 3

In 2014 the Rugby League European Federation announced a new European Championship structure in which the European Bowl would be renamed as the European Championship C. The competition this year saw 3 teams taking part with the Czech Republic being joined by Malta and Greece. The winners were Greece.

== Results ==
Team	Played	Won	Drew	Lost	For	Against	Difference	Points
Greece	2	2	0	0	100	34	+66	4
Malta	2	1	0	1	52	40	+12	2
Czech Republic	2	0	0	2	24	102	-78	0

28 June 2014

Malta	18–32	Greece
Tries: Wills, Attard (2); Conv: Keep (3)	(Report)	Tries: Kanellopoulos, Constantinou, Giorgas-Spanos, Bosmos, Korkidas; Conv: Sue-Tin (6)

FC Melita, Pembroke

12 July 2014

Czech Republic	8–34	Malta
Tries: Suchopár; Conv: Petr Šedina (2)	(Report)	Tries: Muscat (3), Briffa (2), Mizzi; Conv: Keep (4), Parker (1)

Havlichkuv, Brod

11 October 2014

Greece	68–16	Czech Republic
Tries: Meads (6), Korkidas, Syti, Kannellopoulos, Arfaras, Sell, Bosmas; Conv: Sue-Tin (7), Meads (2), Bosmos (1)	(Report)	Tries: Sedina, Kristof, Caslavka; Conv: Kucera (2)

Athens
