= Ukrainian Federation of Rugby League =

Sports governing body in Ukraine

- Founded: 15 April 2008
- Responsibility: Ukraine

(Ukraine)

The Ukrainian Federation of Rugby League is the governing body for the sport of rugby league football in Ukraine. The Association was formed in 2008.

== See also ==
- Ukraine national rugby league team
