= 1970 New Zealand gallantry awards =

Awards list for New Zealand

The 1970 New Zealand gallantry awards were announced via a Special Honours List dated 5 May 1970, and recognised one New Zealander for gallantry during operations in Vietnam.

== Distinguished Flying Cross (DFC) ==
- Flying Officer Trevor Keith Butler – Royal New Zealand Air Force; of Auckland.
