= Ben Dent =

German international rugby league & rugby union footballer

Personal information
- Born: 27 September 1991 (age 34) Germany

Playing information

Rugby league
- Position: Wing, Fullback
Club
Years	Team	Pld	T	G	FG	P
2012–17	York City Knights	79	37	70	0	288
2018–18	Newcastle Thunder	12	4	0	0	16
2019–24	Heworth ARLFC		0	0	0	0
2025–	Goole Vikings	7	2	0	0	8
	Total	98	43	70	0	312
Representative
Years	Team	Pld	T	G	FG	P
2016	Germany	3	3	2	0	16

Rugby union
Club
Years	Team	Pld	T	G	FG	P
2018–19	York RUFC	0	0	0	0	0
- Source: As of 17 February 2026

Ben Dent is a German rugby league footballer who plays as a winger for the Goole Vikings in the Betfred Championship and for Germany at international level.

He has previously played for the York City Knights.

== Career ==
=== York City Knights ===
Dent made his début season for the York City Knights in 2012, playing 5 games. In his 79 appearances for the Knights, he scored 37 tries.

=== Newcastle Thunder ===
At the end of the 2017 season, it was announced that Dent had signed with the Newcastle Thunder.

=== York RUFC ===
Dent made a temporary switch to rugby union in 2018 to play for York RUFC

=== Goole Vikings ===
On 29 October 2024 it was reported that he had signed for Goole Vikings in the RFL League 1.

== International ==
Dent made his international debut for Germany in 2016 against the Wales Dragonhearts, scoring a try. He was selected to play for Germany in the 2021 World Cup qualifiers.
