= Impact of the COVID-19 pandemic on rugby league =

The COVID-19 pandemic had a major impact on the sport of rugby league in both the northern and southern hemispheres with the two major league competitions suspended for periods and numerous other leagues and cup competitions cancelled or abandoned.

== Australia and New Zealand ==
=== NRL ===
The World Health Organization declared the global pandemic on 11 March, the day before the 2020 NRL season was scheduled to start. The first round of games went ahead as scheduled but the pandemic restrictions already had an effect as attendances were lower than anticipated. Between rounds 1 and 2 the New Zealand Government introduced quarantine restrictions which would have meant the New Zealand Warriors having to go into a 14-day quarantine period had they returned home after their round 1 match. Instead the Warriors decide to relocate to Kingscliff, New South Wales and play their round 2 game at the Gold Coast Titans' Cbus Super Stadium instead of their home ground in Auckland. The Warriors will also base themselves in New South Wales for the first three months of 2021.

Rules introduced by the Australian Government limiting gatherings meant that round 2 games were played in empty stadia and on 23 March after round 2 the National Rugby League (NRL) suspended the season. The Australian government allowed the NRL to restart the competition at the end of May with games initially being played behind closed doors at a limited number of venues but later limited crowds were allowed, culminating with over 37,000 being allowed in to watch the Grand Final. With strict bio-security rules introduced in Australia and with the travel restrictions imposed by the New Zealand government the New Zealand Warriors had to base themselves in Australia for the rest of the season. Melbourne Storm were also affected by the COVID-19 situation in Victoria and chose to relocate to the Sunshine Coast, Queensland for the remainder of the season.

The NRL introduced rule changes for player welfare, the most significant being the introduction of the six again or six-to-go rule for infringements at the ruck by defending teams instead of penalties being awarded. The number of referees per game was reduced from two to one.

The length of the regular season was adjusted to 20 games and the J. J. Giltinan Shield was won by Penrith Panthers. The Panthers reached the Grand Final but were defeated in the final by Melbourne Storm.

=== State of Origin ===
The State of Origin series had to be moved from its traditional mid-season slot to November. Queensland won the series 2–1.

=== Women's rugby league ===
The Women's Premiership took place as scheduled with Brisbane Broncos winning the Grand Final. The State of Origin game was delayed until November and saw Queensland beat New South Wales 24–18.

== France ==
On 13 March 2020, the FFR announced the postponement of all rugby league in the country including the major competitions such as the Elite One Championship, Elite Two Championship, and Lord Derby Cup. Exactly a month later on 13 April, the FFR declared these competitions null and void, with no titles to be awarded. The 2020–21 competitions would go ahead behind closed doors.

== United Kingdom ==
=== Super League ===
==== 2020 season ====
The 2020 Super League had already started when the global pandemic was declared with the first six rounds of the competition complete. The first effects were seen in round 7 when Leeds Rhinos refused to travel to Catalans Dragons for a game scheduled for 13 March as one of the Leeds players was displaying symptoms of COVID-19. Three days later the Rugby Football League (RFL) suspended all competition at all levels. The RFL suspension was only planned to last for three weeks with 2 April marked as the date for a return to playing, in the end it was 2 August before the Super League competition resumed. In the interim period Toronto Wolfpack withdrew from the league citing financial pressures. An application to be reinstated into Super League by Toronto was declined leading to a post-season process to decide a 12th Super League club for 2021.

When the season did resume, it was a limited number of grounds and all games were played behind closed doors. The only exception to the latter were three home games played by Catalans in Perpignan where French government COVID-19 regulations allowed crowds up to 5,000 to attend. The time lost and Toronto's withdrawal led to two other significant changes to the season format. Firstly the number of rounds of games was reduced from the planned 29 to 22 and eventually to 20. Secondly league position was decided by win percentage (number of wins divided by number of games played), a format not seen in British rugby league since the 1944–45 Wartime Emergency League.

Fixtures were often postponed and re-arranged at short notice due to the numbers of players and coaching staff testing positive for COVID-19 with teams playing several games at short-notice and/or in a short space of time. When it became apparent that no team was going to fulfil all its fixtures, exemplified by Hull Kingston Rovers announcement at the beginning of November that they would be unable to fulfil their remaining games, the clubs and the RFL agreed to end the season after round 20 and move to the play-offs.

Having played 17 games and won 13, Wigan Warriors won the League Leaders Shield. In the play-offs they and close rivals St Helens reached the Grand Final played at the KCOM Stadium, Hull, instead of the regular venue at Old Trafford due to concerns from Manchester United about the event likely needing to be rescheduled, which they could not accommodate. The Grand Final saw St Helens triumphed 8–4 with a try scored after the final hooter had sounded.

The RFL adopted the six-again rule introduced by the NRL and took the additional step of abolishing scrums. Scrums were replaced by a handover of possession and a new set of six tackles.

==== 2021 season ====
The 2021 Super League season, which ordinarily would have started in late January, was delayed until March with the hope that the combination of a second full lockdown announced by the UK Government in early January, and start of the UK's COVID-19 vaccination programme would allow for a safer state of play when the league eventually returns. On 11 February it was confirmed that match week one would commence on Friday 26 March, with all fixtures continuing to be played behind closed doors.

=== Championship and League 1 ===
==== 2020 season ====
Five rounds of the Championship competition and two rounds of the League 1 competition had been played by 16 March. After consultation with the clubs, both competitions were abandoned and declared null and void in July.

==== 2021 season ====
For the 2021 competitions, the RFL announced that as a precaution against continued COVID-19 disruption both league tables will be based on win percentage.

=== Challenge Cup and 1895 Cup ===
==== 2020 season ====
The Challenge Cup competition had completed the first five rounds before the suspension of the sport in March. In July the clubs met with the RFL and all the non-Super League teams remaining in the competition withdrew. The RFL therefore remade the draw for the sixth and subsequent rounds to only include the 11 remaining Super League sides. The final, which should have been played in July, was eventually played at an empty Wembley Stadium on 17 October and saw Leeds Rhinos beat Salford Red Devils 17–16.

The 1895 Cup, the cup competition solely for the Championship and League 1 clubs, was cancelled.

==== 2021 season ====
For the 2021 competition, amateur clubs were excluded from the competition in an attempt to make the competition more COVID-19 secure. In addition, due to numerical reasons, only three out of eleven League 1 could participate. Barrow Raiders, Keighley Cougars, and West Wales Raiders would be those teams competing. As a result of the reduced number of teams, the 2021 edition would be six rounds rather than nine.

Due to non-league team not competing in the tournament, the first two rounds of the competition were made concurrent with the 1895 Cup in an attempt to ease the fixture list. As a result of this, the winners of round 2 of the Challenge Cup would qualify for the semi-finals of the 1985 cup, as well as the last 16 of the Challenge Cup - the stage Super League teams enter.

The 2021 Challenge Cup Final was played in front of 40,000 fans, just short of half the capacity Wembley Stadium, as a government large crowd pilot scheme (10,000 fans being the then legal limit outside of pilot schemes).

=== Women's rugby league ===
All 2020 league competitions were cancelled before any games had been played and the 2020 Challenge Cup competition was abandoned after a single game in the first round had been played.

=== Amateur rugby ===
The 2020 National Conference League season was postponed and later cancelled after two matchweeks.

== International rugby league ==
=== 2021 World Cup ===
The pandemic forced the organisers of the World Cup to develop contingency plans to defer the tournaments to 2022 should it become necessary to postpone in 2021. In July 2021, Australia and New Zealand pulled due to the pandemic aimed concerns around the emergence of the Delta variant in the tournament's hosts country England. Specifically, Australia at the time also had rising COVID-19 cases and a relatively small proportion of the population vaccinated. In contrast, New Zealand was virtually COVID-free and feared re-introduction following the return of players and fans. On 5 August, the tournament was officially postponed to 2022 due to the withdrawal of Australia and New Zealand.

=== Continental Tournaments ===
==== Europe ====
Euro A was cancelled due to the teams playing in the tournament playing in the delayed World Cup instead. Euro B and D was postponed to 2021, and Euro C postponed to 2022.

==== Oceania ====
The Oceania Cup was cancelled.

==== Middle East and Africa ====
The Middle East-Africa Championship was cancelled.

==== Americas ====
The Americas Championship was cancelled.

=== Tours ===
2020 Kangaroo tour
- Date: 31 October 2020 – 14 November 2020

Tour chronology
- Previous tour: 2003
- Next tour: 2025

The 2020 Kangaroo Tour was a planned tour by the Australia national rugby league team in England which was going to be the first Kangaroo tour and first Ashes series since 2003. On 1 June 2020, due to scheduling complications resulting from the COVID-19 pandemic, the tour was cancelled.

Fixtures against the Toronto Wolfpack at BMO Field on 24 October and a test match against France were among those believed to have been planned, but were unconfirmed at the time of the tour's cancellation. The test matches were scheduled for 31 October; 7 November and 14 November, and would have been played at three football grounds; the University of Bolton Stadium, Horwich; Elland Road, Leeds; and Tottenham Hotspur Stadium, London respectively.

=== Nines ===
The 2023 Rugby League World Cup 9s was cancelled.
