= 2020 Americas Rugby League Championship =

2020 Americas Championship
- Number of teams: 4
- Host country: Jamaica
- Matches played: 4

The 2020 Americas Rugby League Championship was a planned rugby league tournament scheduled to be held in Kingston, Jamaica in November 2020. This tournament would have been the 4th Americas Rugby League Championship. On 12 June 2020 it was announced that the tournament was postponed due to the COVID-19 pandemic. It was provisionally rescheduled for May 2021 to be played alongside the America 9s (Rugby league nines) competition hosted by the USA. Due to the change of venue the Jamaica Rugby League Association was offered first option on hosting the 2022 Americas Championship. In April 2021 it was announced that the championship was abandoned with the 2022 tournament being the next event.
