= Connor Hampson =

German rugby league footballer

Personal information
- Full name: Connor Hampson
- Born: 11 November 1998 (age 26)
- Height: 191 cm (6 ft 3 in)
- Weight: 115 kg (18 st 2 lb; 254 lb)

Playing information
- Position: Prop
Club
Years	Team	Pld	T	G	FG	P
	Featherstone Lions
Representative
Years	Team	Pld	T	G	FG	P
2018–	Germany	4	2	0	0	8

Connor Hampson (born 11 November 1998) is a German rugby league footballer who currently plays for the Halifax RLFC reserve grade side. He plays as a Prop.

== Career ==
Hampson represents Germany internationally, making his debut for the nation in 2018 against Czech Republic in the 2021 Men's Rugby League World Cup qualifying.
