= Brad Billsborough =

Germany international rugby league footballer

Personal information
- Full name: Bradley Billsborough
- Born: 4 August 1998 (age 27) Wigan, England

Playing information
- Position: Scrum-half, Hooker
Club
Years	Team	Pld	T	G	FG	P
2018	Whitehaven	6	1	4	0	12
2018	Swinton Lions	10	0	1	0	2
2020–23	North Wales Crusaders	54	10	90	1	221
2024–25	Midlands Hurricanes	5	2	3	0	14
2026	Swinton Lions	1	0	0	0	0
2026	North Wales Crusaders	0	0	0	0	0
2026	Swinton Lions	1	0	0	0	0
2026–	North Wales Crusaders	1	0	0	0	0
	Total	78	13	98	1	249
Representative
Years	Team	Pld	T	G	FG	P
2016–	Germany	6	8	20	0	72
- Source: As of 17 May 2026

Brad Billsborough (born 4 August 1998) is a British rugby league footballer who plays as a scrum-half for North Wales Crusaders in the RFL Championship. He also represents Germany internationally.

He has previously played for Whitehaven and North Wales Crusaders in the Championship after coming through the St Helens academy team. He had a spell in Australia in 2019 season winning the group 2 premiership with Grafton Ghost. Billsborough's junior clubs were Newton Storm & Thatto Heath Crusaders.

He was selected to play for Germany in the 2021 World Cup qualifiers; qualifying via his German-born mother. In 2018, Billsborough became Germany's youngest ever captain.

== Swinton Lions (re-join) ==
On 2 April 2026 it was reported that he had signed for Swinton Lions in the RFL Championship

On 11 May 2026 it was reported that he had left Swinton Lions and returned to North Wales Crusaders
