= Osby Municipality =

Osby Municipality Osby kommun
- Municipality
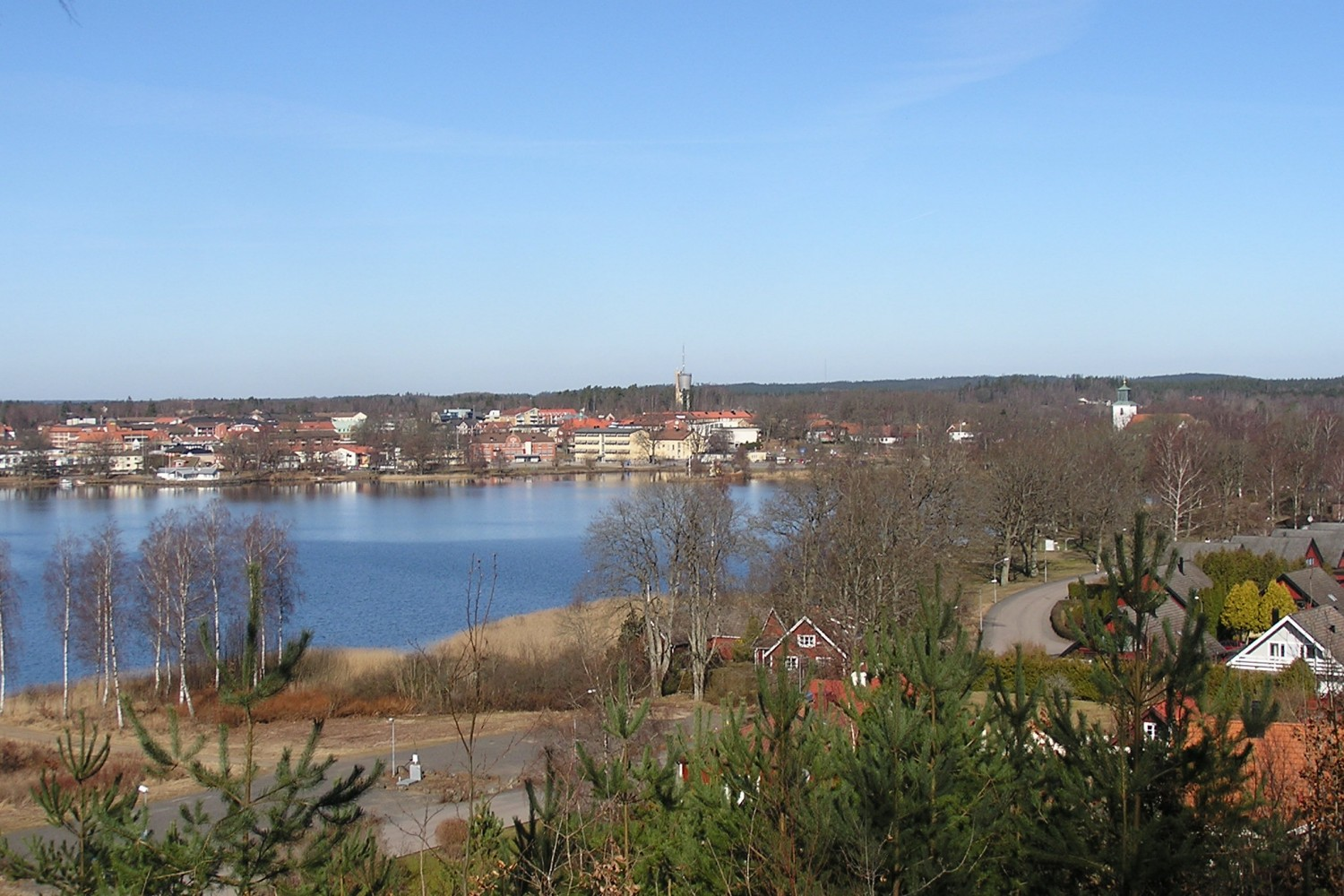

- Flag Coat of arms

- Country: Sweden
- County: Scania County
- Seat: Osby

Area
  - Total: 599.84 km^{2} (231.60 sq mi)
  - Land: 576.24 km^{2} (222.49 sq mi)
  - Water: 23.6 km^{2} (9.1 sq mi)
- Area as of 1 January 2014.

Population (30 June 2025)
  - Total: 12,911
  - Density: 22.406/km^{2} (58.030/sq mi)
- Time zone: UTC+1 (CET)
  - Summer (DST): UTC+2 (CEST)
- ISO 3166 code: SE
- Province: Scania
- Municipal code: 1273
- Website: www.osby.se

Osby Municipality (Swedish: Osby kommun) is a municipality in Scania County in Sweden. Its seat is located in the town of Osby.

The amalgamation during the 1970s' local government reform took place in the area on 1 January 1974, when the former market town Osby (itself instituted as such in 1937) was merged with three adjacent rural municipalities.

== Localities ==
There are 3 localities (or built-up areas) in Osby Municipality.

In the table the localities are listed according to the size of the population as of 31 December 2005. The municipal seat is in bold characters.

#	Locality	Population
1	**Osby**	6,947
2	Lönsboda	1,899
3	Killeberg	575

== Demographics ==
This is a demographic table based on Osby Municipality's electoral districts in the 2022 Swedish general election sourced from SVT's election platform, in turn taken from SCB official statistics.

In total there were 13,238 residents, including 9,888 Swedish citizens of voting age. 37.9% voted for the left coalition and 61.1% for the right coalition. Indicators are in percentage points except population totals and income.

Location	Residents	Citizen adults	Left vote	Right vote	Employed	Swedish parents	Foreign heritage	Income SEK	Degree
Location			%	%					
Loshult/Killeberg	1,305	889	37.5	61.8	83	77	23	25,801	34
Osby NV	2,198	1,517	40.6	58.0	75	68	32	22,597	31
Osby NÖ	1,814	1,294	34.9	63.6	78	76	24	22,325	29
Osby N	1,698	1,383	37.1	61.9	74	77	23	21,577	27
Osby SV	1,570	1,238	39.4	59.9	86	82	18	25,310	32
Osby S	1,767	1,372	35.7	63.5	86	84	16	27,089	35
Örkened	1,434	1,107	37.9	61.5	88	91	9	25,385	29
Örkened C	1,452	1,088	37.7	61.5	70	75	25	19,499	21
Source: SVT

== Elections ==
=== Riksdag ===
Year	Turnout	Votes	V	S	MP	C	L	KD	M	SD
2014	85.5	8,244	3.4	35.2	4.3	5.9	2.7	4.9	16.1	25.4
2018	87.0	8,385	3.9	28.2	2.2	7.3	2.4	7.3	16.1	31.2

== International relations ==
The municipality is twinned with:

- Gribskov Municipality (formerly Græsted-Gilleleje), Denmark
