= Sång till Skåne =

Sång till Skåne (A song for Scania), or Vackra hembygd, du som vilar is a poem written by Nils Hansson. The author of the music is Joseph Haydn. It is used official as a song representing the Swedish region of Scania. With the music from Joseph Haydn's Gott erhalte Franz den Kaiser, that is also used for the German national anthem, it was performed in the Christening of Prince Oscar, Duke of Skåne on 27 May 2016.

== Swedish original lyrics ==
1
Vackra hembygd, du som vilar
Trygg i blåa böljors famn,
Nu till dig vår tanke ilar
Och vi nämna glatt ditt namn
Minnas ljuva barndomsstunder
Uti lugna goda hem
Uppå slätter och i lunder
Minnas vad vi lärt av dem

2
Månsken över gröna ängar
Sommarsol på sädesvång
Blomsterdoft från trädgårdssängar
Och i skogen fågelsång
Hell dig, Skåne, hell dig kära
Fostermoder, vän och blid
Må vår kärlek ömt dig bära
Fram till lycka och till frid!

3
Nu är tid att återgiva
Vad som lån vi fått av dig
Med vårt arbete dig bliva
Stödet på din framtids stig
Så din framtids skördar, väva
Glatt din framtids väv, och så
Med vårt ungdomsmod, det gäva
För ditt väl på vakt att stå

4
Måtte gyllne skördar hölja
Städs' din näringsrika mull
Och på andens marker bölja
Andeskördars rika gull!
Bruse över slätter vida
Frihetsvindars stolta gång
Ringe över vångar blida
Skära känslors lärkesång!

== English translation ==
1
Our fair land, you who rest
Safe in the arms of blue billows
Now our thoughts hasten to you
And we mention merrily your name
Remember delightful moments of youth
In peaceful good homes
In plains and in groves
Remember what we learnt from them

2
Moonlight over green meadows
Summerlight over fields of corn
Scent of flowers from garden meads
And in the forest singing of birds
Hail to thee, Scania, hail to thee dear
Foster-mother, fair and gentle
May our love tenderly carry you
To happiness and peace

3
Now is the time for us to give back
What we have gotten from you as loan
To become, with our work
The support of your future path
Sow the harvest of your future, weave
Happily your future web, and sow
With our able courageous youth
To be on guard for your well-being

4
May golden harvests always supply
Your nutritious earth
And on the soils of the ghost
Wave the rich gold of the ghosts' harvests
Roar over wide plains
The proud walk of winds of freedom
Bell, toll over mild fields
The larksong of pure feelings.
