= Scania =

Province in Sweden

Scania Skåne
- Historical province
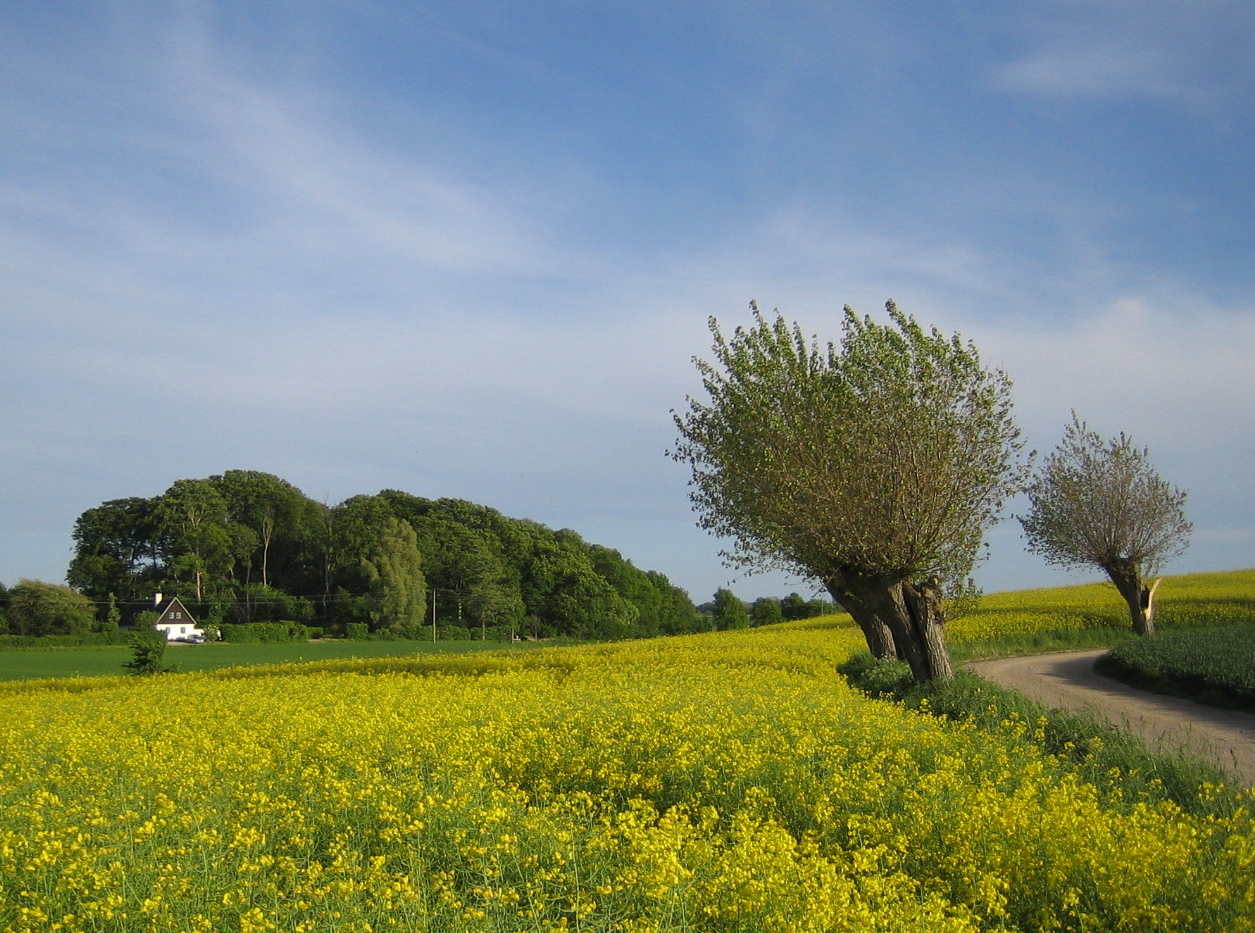

- Flag Coat of arms

- Coordinates: 55°48′N 13°37′E
- Country: Sweden
- Land: Götaland
- County: Skåne County
- Largest city: Malmö

Area
  - Total: 10,939 km^{2} (4,224 sq mi)

Population (31 December 2023)
  - Total: 1,418,496
  - Density: 129.67/km^{2} (335.85/sq mi)

Ethnicity
  - Language: Swedish
  - Dialect: Scanian

Culture
  - Flower: Oxeye daisy
  - Animal: Red deer
  - Bird: Red kite
  - Fish: Eel
- Time zone: UTC+1 (CET)
  - Summer (DST): UTC+2 (CEST)
- Postal codes: 20000–29999
- Area codes: 040–046

Scania, (Note: /ˈskæniə/ SKAH-nee-ə or /ˈskeɪniə/ SKAY-nee-ə) also known by its native name of Skåne, (Note: Swedish: [ˈskôːnɛ]) is the southernmost of the historical provinces (landskap) of Sweden. Located in the south tip of the geographical region of Götaland, the province is roughly conterminous with Skåne County, created in 1997. Like the other historical provinces of Sweden, Scania still features in colloquial speech and in cultural references, and can therefore not be regarded as an archaic concept. Within Scania there are 33 municipalities that are autonomous within the Skåne Regional Council. Scania's largest city, Malmö, is the third-largest city in Sweden, as well as the fifth-largest in Scandinavia.

To the north, Scania borders the historical provinces of Halland and Småland, to the northeast Blekinge, to the east and south the Baltic Sea, and to the west Öresund. Since 2000, a road and railway bridge, the Öresund Bridge, bridges the Sound and connects Scania with Denmark. Scania forms part of the transnational Øresund Region.

From north to south Scania is around 130 km; it covers less than 3% of Sweden's total area. The population is over 1,418,000. It represents 13% of the country's population. With 121/km^{2} (310/sq mi), Scania is the second most densely populated province in Sweden.

Historically, Scania formed part of the kingdom of Denmark until the signing of the Treaty of Roskilde in 1658, when all Danish lands east of Öresund were ceded to Sweden.

== Name ==
=== Endonym and exonyms ===
The endonym used in Swedish and other North Germanic languages is Skåne (formerly spelled Skaane in Danish and Norwegian). The Latinized form Scania is an exonym in English. Sometimes the endonym Skåne is used in English text, such as in tourist information, even sometimes as Skane with the diacritic omitted. Scania is one of the few Swedish provinces (as also Dalarna) for which exonyms are widely used in many languages, such as French Scanie, Dutch and German Schonen, Polish Skania, Spanish Escania, Italian Scania, etc. For the province's modern administrative counterpart, Skåne län, the endonym Skåne is used in English.

In the Alfredian translation of Orosius's and Wulfstan's travel accounts, the Old English form Sconeg appears. Frankish sources mention a place called Sconaowe; Æthelweard, an Anglo-Saxon historian, wrote about Scani; and in Beowulf's fictional account, the names Scedenige and Scedeland appear as names for what is a Danish land.

=== Etymology ===
The names Scania and Scandinavia are considered to have the same etymology. The southernmost tip of what today is Sweden was called Scania by the Romans and thought to be an island. The actual etymology of the word remains dubious and has long been a matter of debate among scholars. The name is possibly derived from the Germanic root *Skaðin-awjã, which appears in Old Norse as Skáney [ˈskɑːnˌœy]. According to some scholars, the Germanic stem can be reconstructed as *Skaðan- meaning "danger" or "damage" (English scathing, German Schaden, Swedish skada). Skanör in Scania, with its long Falsterbo reef, has the same stem (skan) combined with -ör, which means "sandbanks".

== Administration ==
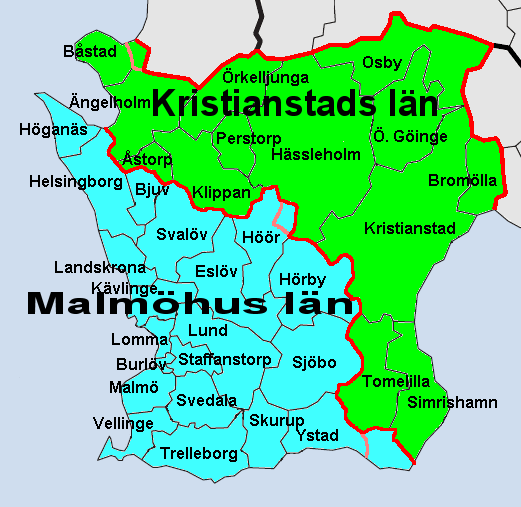
The two counties of Scania from 1719 to 1996

Between 1719 and 1996, the province was subdivided in two administrative counties (län), Kristianstad County and Malmöhus County, each under a governor (landshövding) appointed by the central government of Sweden.

When the first local government acts took effect in 1863, each county also got an elected county council (landsting). The counties were further divided into municipalities.

The local government reform of 1952 reduced the number of municipalities, and a second subdivision reform, carried out between 1968 and 1974, established today's 33 municipalities (Swedish: kommuner) in Scania. The municipalities have municipal governments, similar to city commissions, and are further divided into parishes (församlingar). The parishes are primarily entities of the Church of Sweden, but they also serve as a divisioning measure for the Swedish population registration and other statistical uses.

In 1999, the county council areas were amalgamated, forming Skåne Regional Council (Region Skåne), responsible mainly for public healthcare, public transport and regional planning and culture.

== Heraldry ==
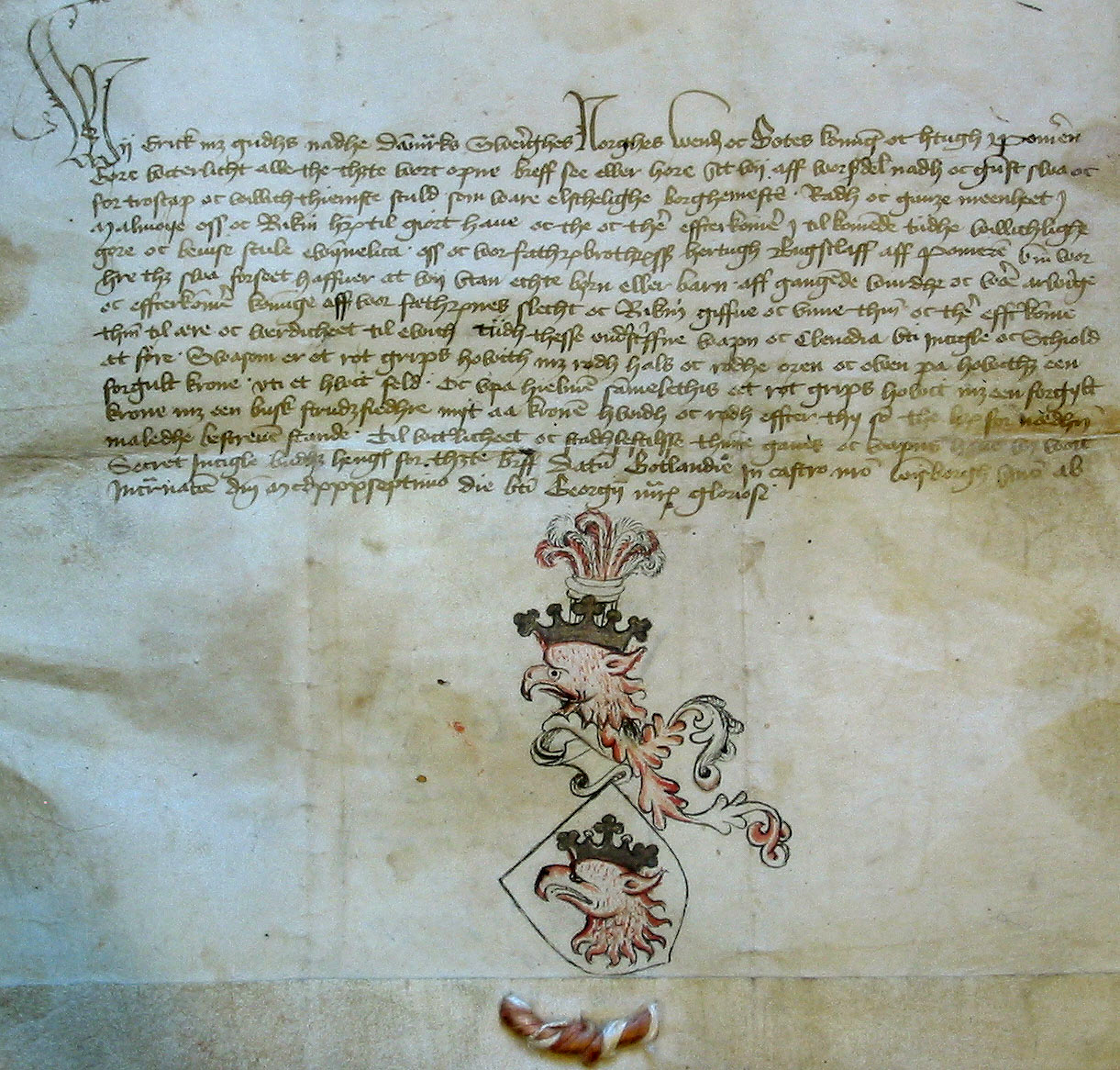
Letter from Eric of Pomerania dated 1437, with a description of the arms granted to the city of Malmö.

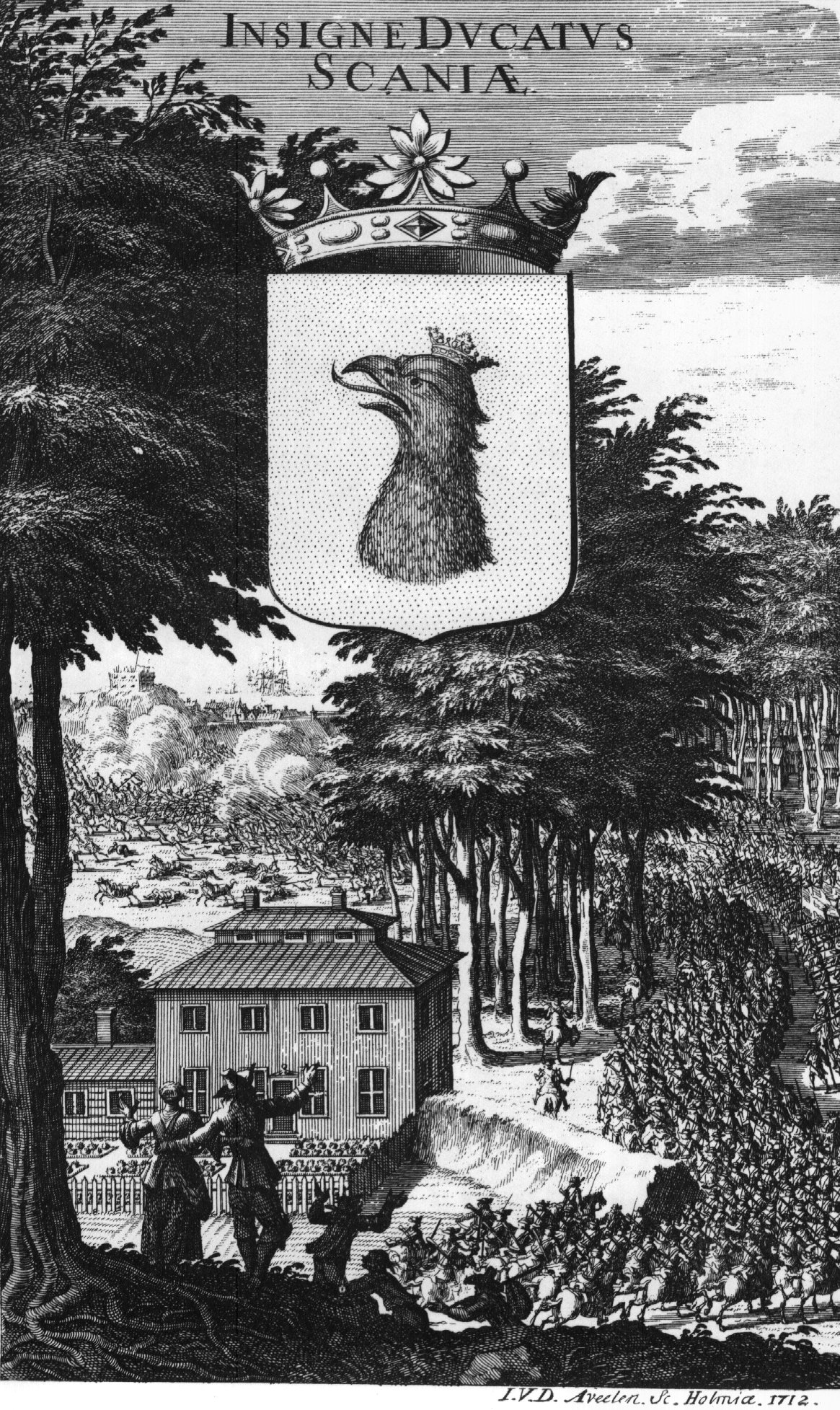
The coat of arms of Scania in an engraving from 1712 in Erik Dahlbergh's Suecia Antiqua et Hodierna.

During the Danish era, the province had no coat of arms. In Sweden, however, every province had been represented by heraldic arms since 1560. When Charles X Gustav of Sweden suddenly died in 1660 a coat of arms had to be created for the newly acquired province, as each province was to be represented by its arms at his royal funeral. After an initiative from Baron Gustaf Bonde, the Lord High Treasurer of Sweden, the coat of arms of the City of Malmö was used as a base for the new provincial arms. The Malmö coat of arms had been granted in 1437, during the Kalmar Union, by Eric of Pomerania and contains a Pomeranian griffin's head. To distinguish it from the city's coat of arms the tinctures were changed and the official blazon for the provincial arms is, in English: Or, a griffin's head erased gules, crowned azure and armed azure, when it should be armed.

The province was divided in two administrative counties 1719–1996. Coats of arms were created for these entities, also using the griffin motif. The new Skåne County, operative from 1 January 1997, got a coat of arms that is the same as the province's, but with reversed tinctures. When the county arms is shown with a Swedish royal crown, it represents the County Administrative Board, which is the regional presence of central government authority. In 1999 the two county councils (landsting) were amalgamated forming Region Skåne. It is the only one of its kind using a heraldic coat of arms. It is also the same as the province's and the county's, but with a golden griffin's head on a blue shield. The 33 municipalities within the county also have coats of arms.

The Scania Griffin has become a well-known symbol for the province and is also used by commercial enterprises. It is, for instance, included in the logotypes of the automotive manufacturer Scania AB and the airline Malmö Aviation.

=== Coat of arms ===
City of Malmö (1437)

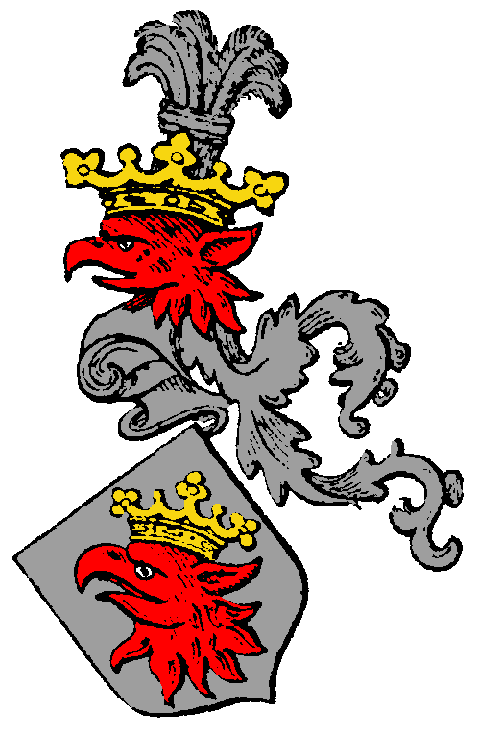
City of Malmö
(revised 1974)

Skåne
(1660, revised 1939)

Kristianstad County
(revised 1939)

Malmöhus County
(revised 1939)

Skåne County
(1997)

== History ==
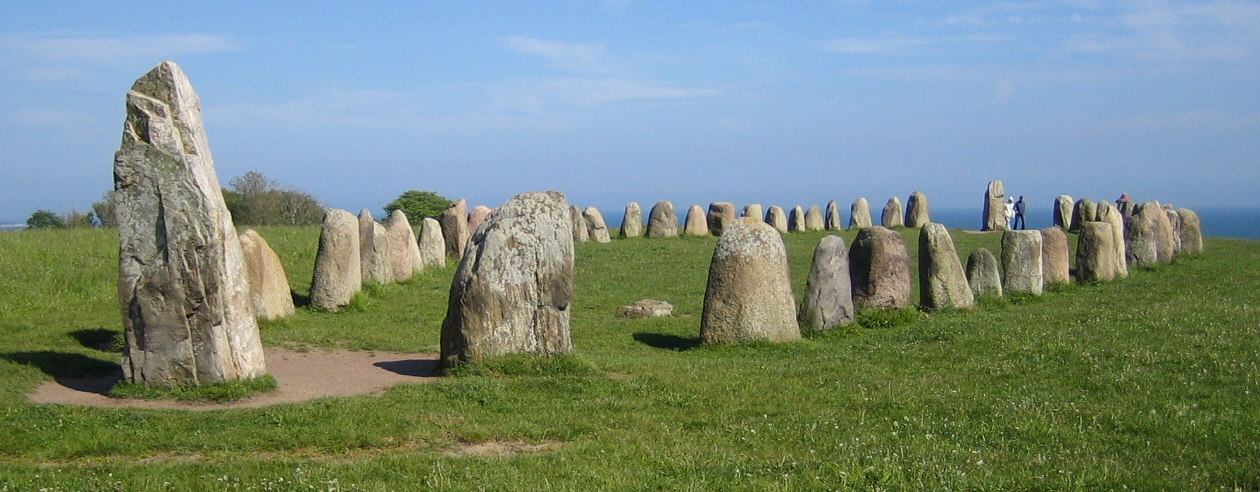
Ale's Stones, a stone ship (burial monument) from c. 500 AD on the coast at Kåseberga, around ten kilometres (6.2 miles) south east of Ystad.

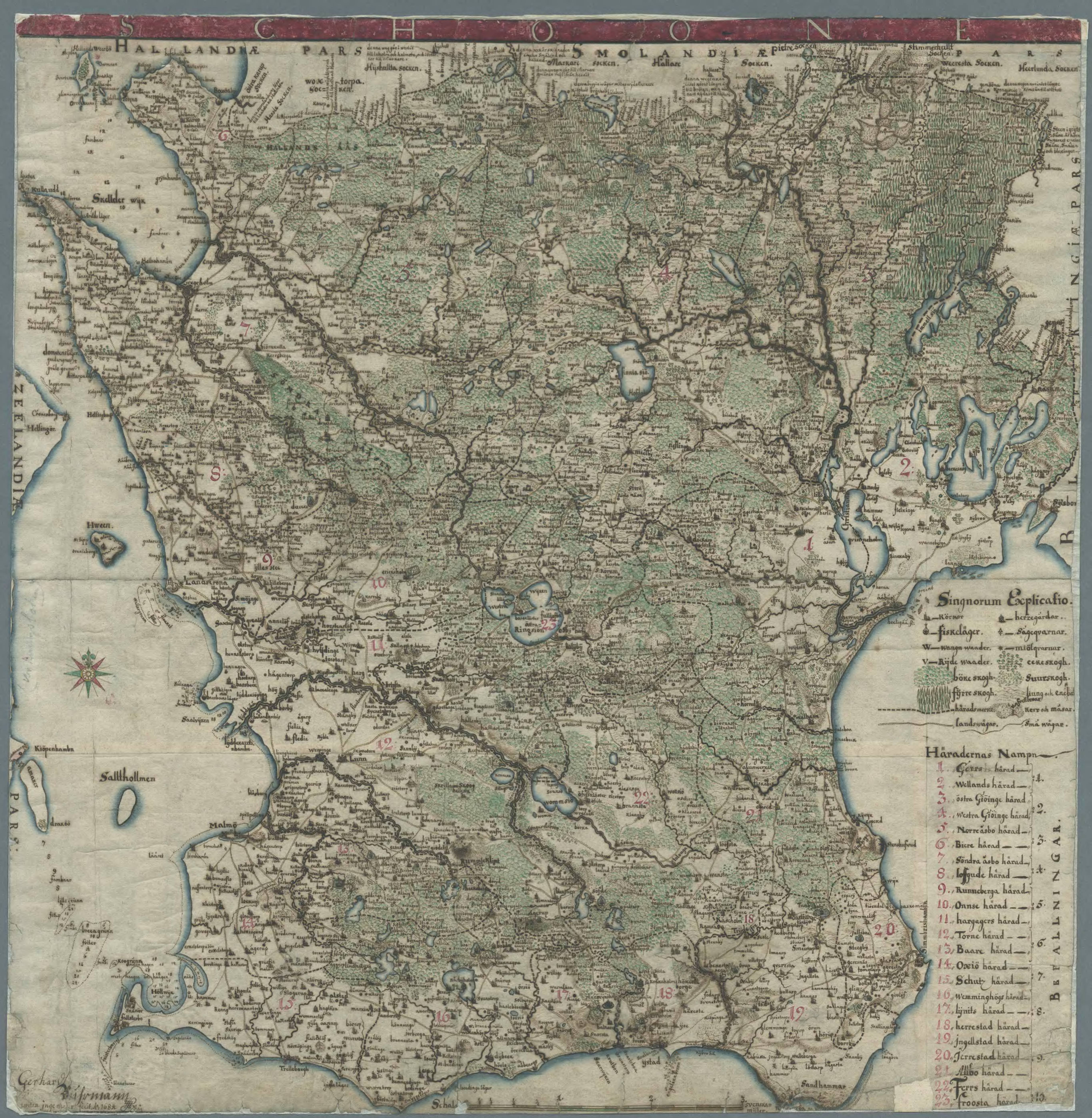
Gerhard von Buhrman's map of Scania, 1684

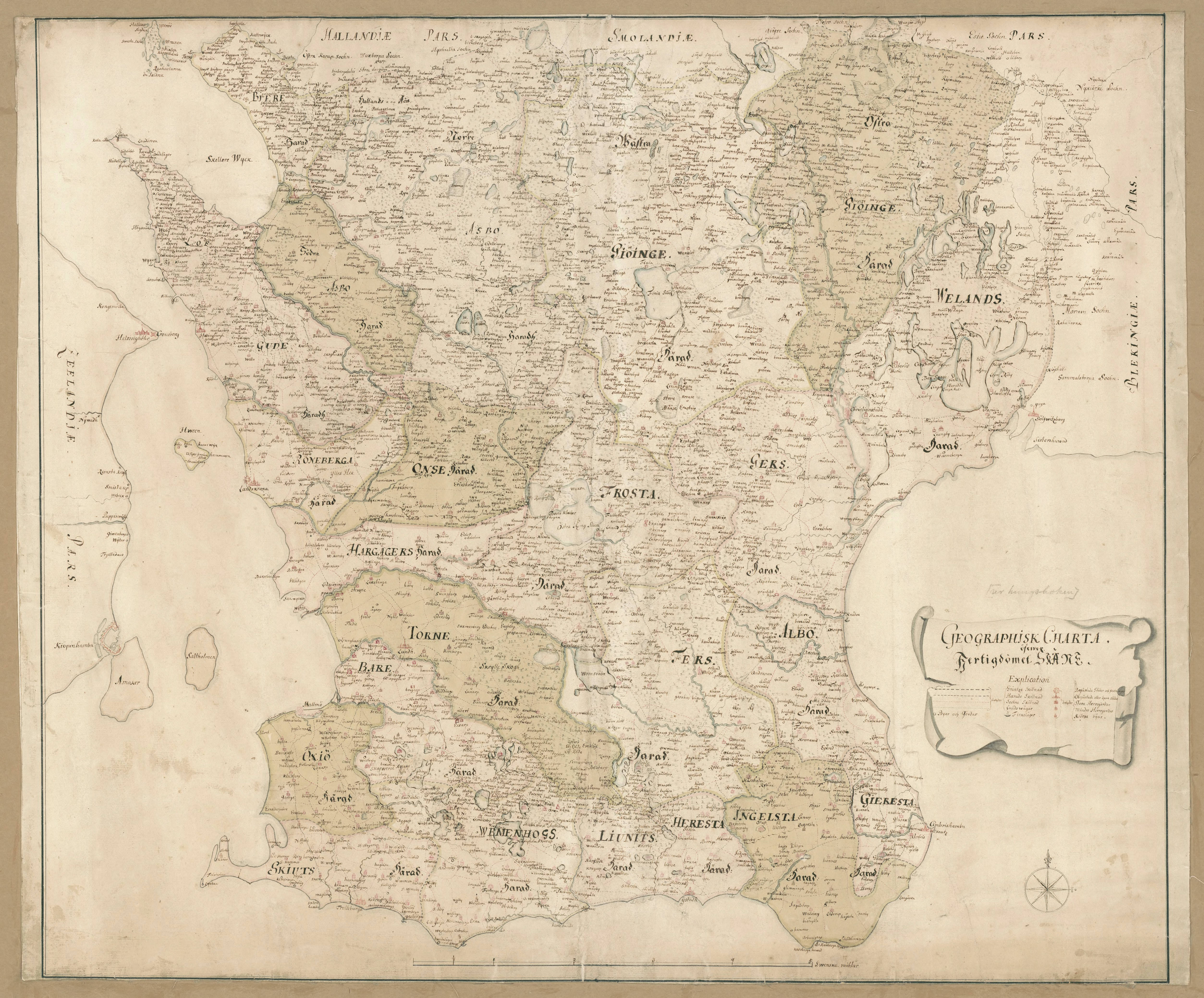
Map of Scania, 1690

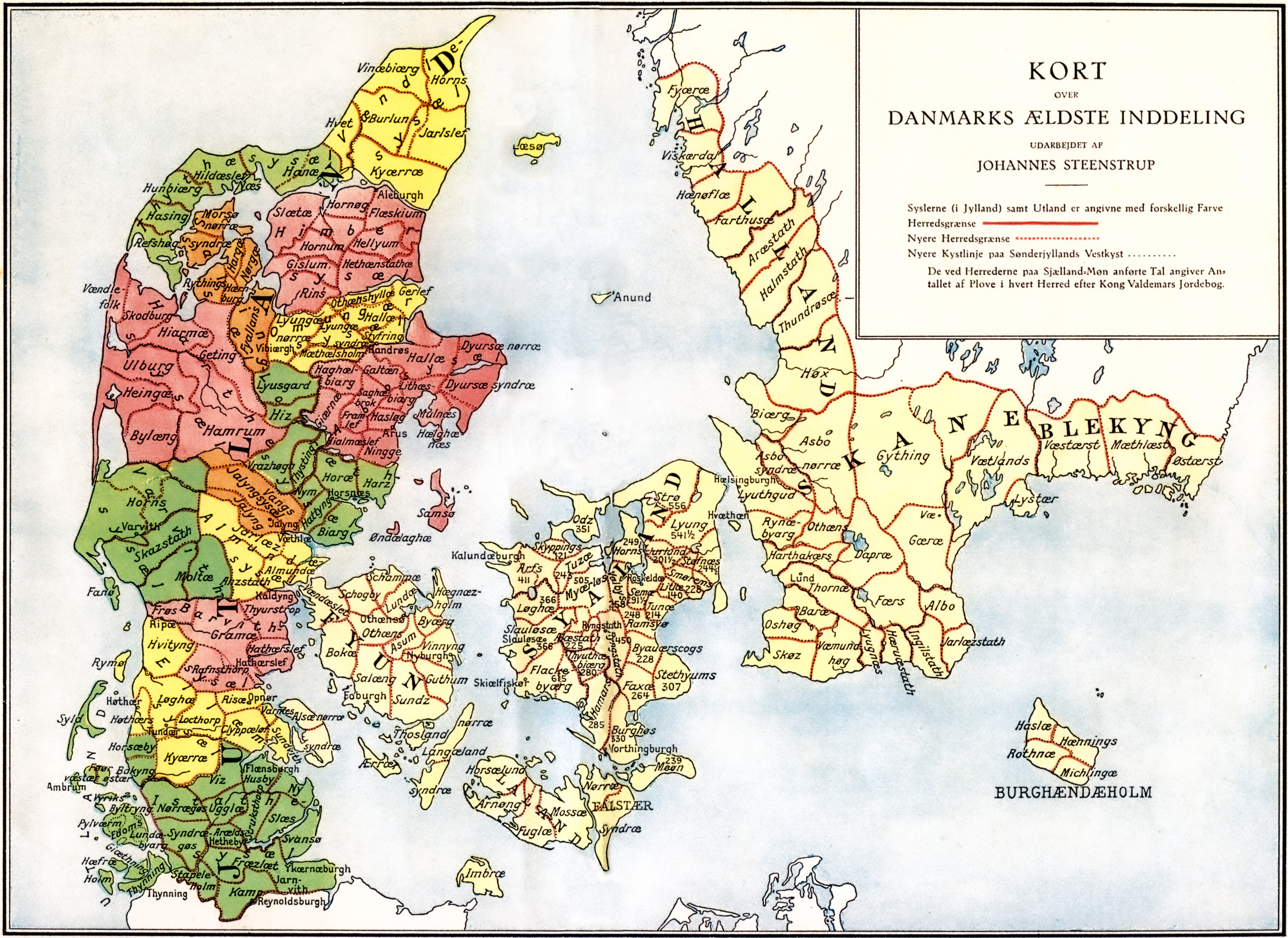
Map of Denmark in the Middle Ages, Scania was together with the provinces Blekinge and Halland a part of Denmark

Scania was first mentioned in written texts in the 9th century. It came under Danish king Harald Bluetooth in the middle of the 10th century. Situated on the Scandinavian Peninsula, it formed the eastern part of the kingdom of Denmark. This geographical position made it the focal point of the frequent Dano-Swedish wars for hundreds of years.

By the Treaty of Roskilde in 1658, all Danish lands east of Öresund were ceded to Sweden. First placed under a Governor-General, the province was eventually integrated into the kingdom of Sweden. Denmark occupied parts of the province (1676–1679) during the Scanian War and again briefly in 1710 during the Great Northern War. The last Danish attempt to regain its lost provinces failed after the 1710 Battle of Helsingborg.

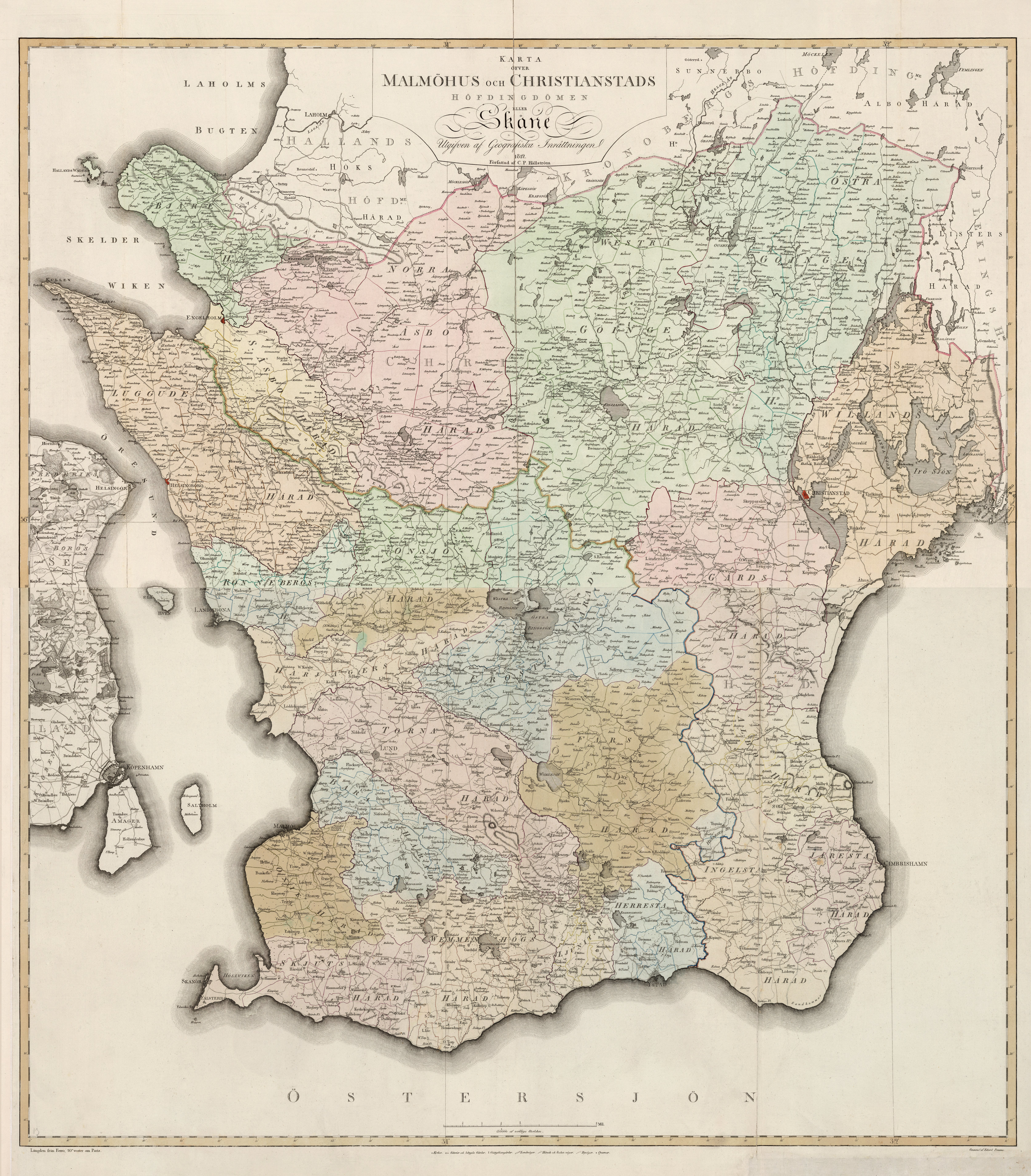
Detailed map of Skåne, 1805

In 1719, the province was subdivided in two counties and administered in the same way as the rest of Sweden. In July 1720, a peace treaty between Sweden and Denmark again confirmed the status of Scania as part of Sweden.

== Politics ==
During Sweden's financial crisis in the early and mid-1990s, Scania, Västra Götaland and Norrbotten were among the hardest hit in the country, with high unemployment rates as a result. In response to the crisis, the County Governors were given a task by the government in September 1996 to co-ordinate various measures in the counties to increase economic growth and employment by bringing in regional actors. The first proposal for regional autonomy and a regional parliament had been introduced by the Social Democratic Party's local districts in Scania and Västra Götaland already in 1993. When Sweden joined the European Union two years later, the concept "Regions of Europe" came in focus and a more regionalist-friendly approach was adopted in national politics. These factors contributed to the subsequent transformation of Skåne County into one of the first "trial regions" in Sweden in 1999, established as the country's first "regional experiment".

The relatively strong regional identity in Scania is often referred to in order to explain the general support in the province for the decentralization efforts introduced by the Swedish government. On the basis of large scale interview investigations about Region Skåne in Scania, scholars have found that the prevailing trend among the inhabitants of Scania is to "[look] upon their region with more positive eyes and a firm reliance that it would deliver the goods in terms of increased democracy and constructive results out of economic planning".

On 28 November 2017, Region Scania ruled that the Scanian flag would become the official regional flag of Scania.

== Transport ==
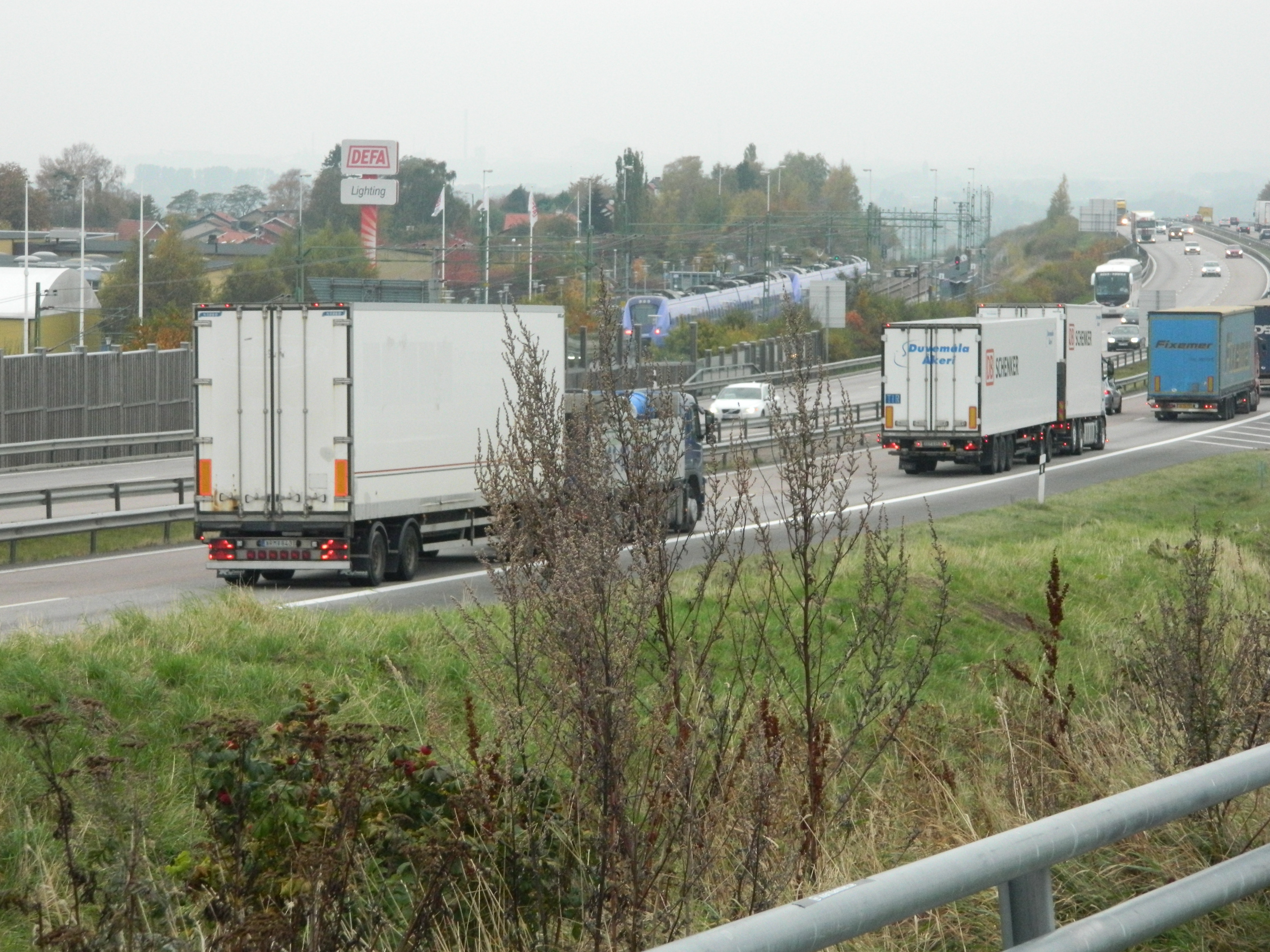
The motorway through western Scania, E6, here at motorway service Glumslöv, is the artery of the western part of the province.

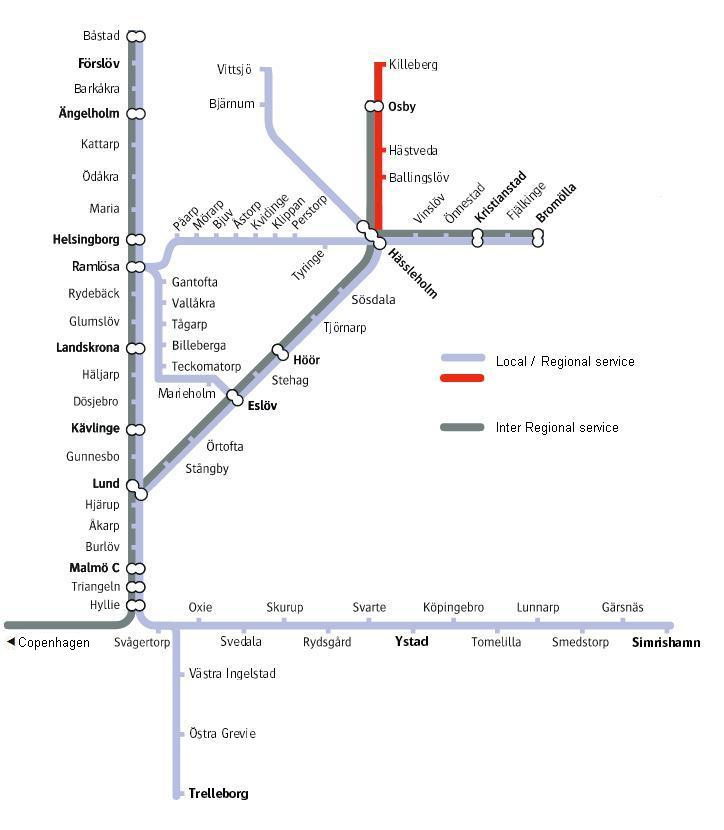
All local, regional and inter-regional train services within Scania (2018). In all, 72 stations are served, during day times at least one train per hour and direction. Many stations (especially in the west) have far better service than so. The busiest part is between Hyllie (Malmö) and Lund.

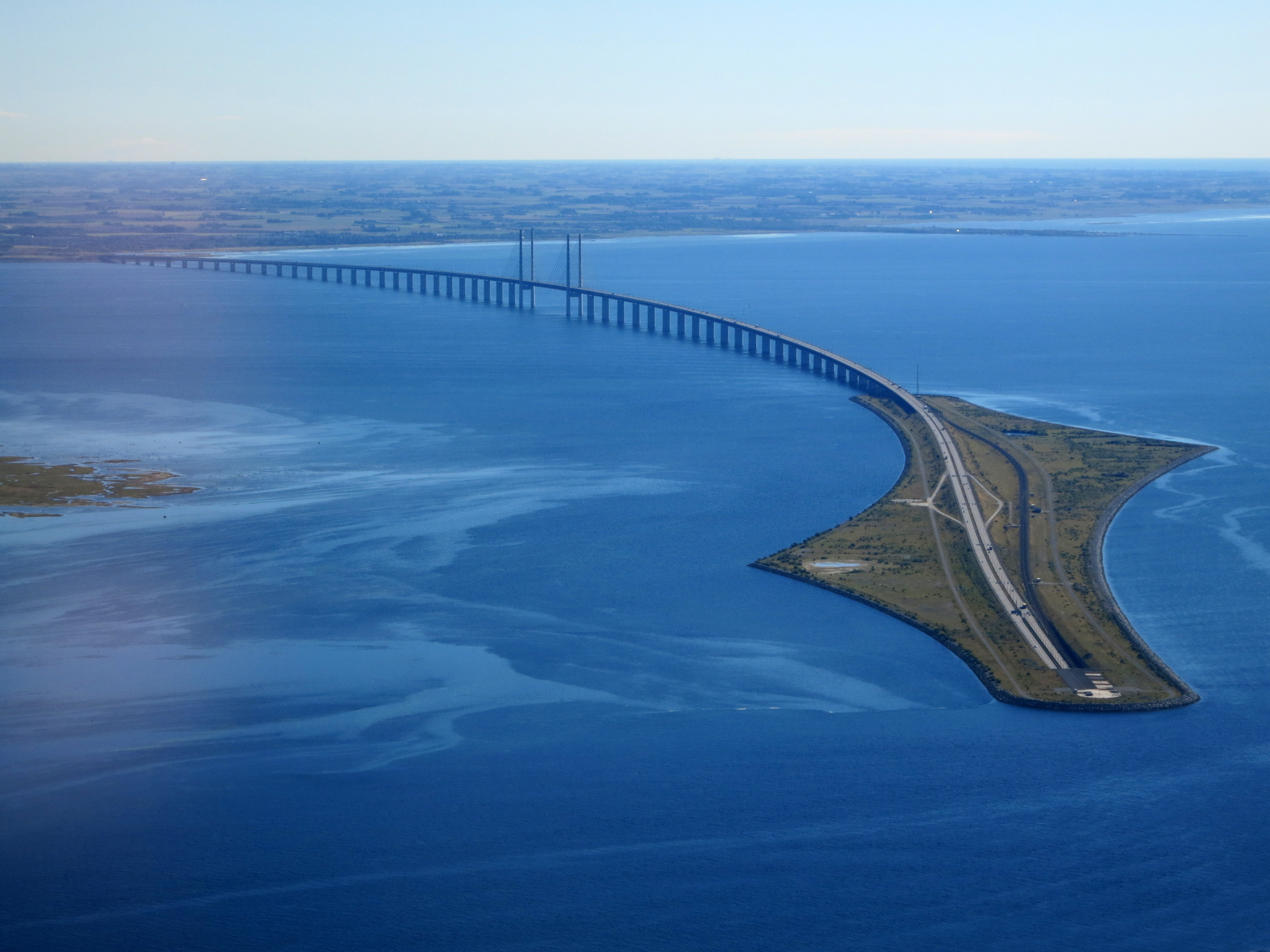
Öresund Bridge is a combined railway and motorway cable-stayed bridge across the Øresund strait between Denmark and Sweden.

Electrified dual track railroad exists from the border with Denmark at the Øresund Bridge to Malmö and onwards to Lund. The latter part has consisted of four tracks since October 2023. In Lund, the tracks split into two directions. The dual tracks going towards Gothenburg end at Helsingborg, while the other branch continues beyond the provincial border to neighbouring Småland, close to Killeberg. This latter dual track continues to mid-Sweden. There are also a few single track railroads connecting cities like Trelleborg, Ystad and Kristianstad. Just as five Scanian stations are served partly (Hässleholm and Osby) or entirely (Ballingslöv, Hästveda and Killeberg) by Småland local trains, the Scanian Pågatåg trains serve Markaryd in Småland.

There are basically three ticket systems: Skånetrafiken tickets can be purchased for all regional traffic including to Denmark, while the Danish Rejsekort system can only be used at stations served by Øresundståg and equipped with special card readers. Additionally, Swedish national SJ-tickets are available for longer trips to the north.

The E6 motorway is the main artery through the western part of Scania all the way from Trelleborg to the provincial border towards neighbouring Halland. It continues along the Swedish west coast to Gothenburg and most of the way to the Norwegian border. There are also several other motorways, especially around Malmö. Since 2000, the economic focus of the region has changed, with the opening of a road link across the Øresund Bridge to Denmark.

The car ferry service between Helsingborg and Helsingør has 70 departures in each direction daily as of 2014.

There are three minor airports in Malmö, Ängelholm and Kristianstad. The nearby Copenhagen Airport, which is the largest international airport in the Nordic countries, also serves the province.

== Geography ==
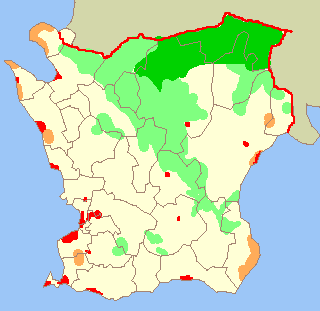
Land usage in Scania, showing hardwood forests (light green), pinewood forests (dark green), fields (yellow), garden and fruit (orange) and residential areas (red)

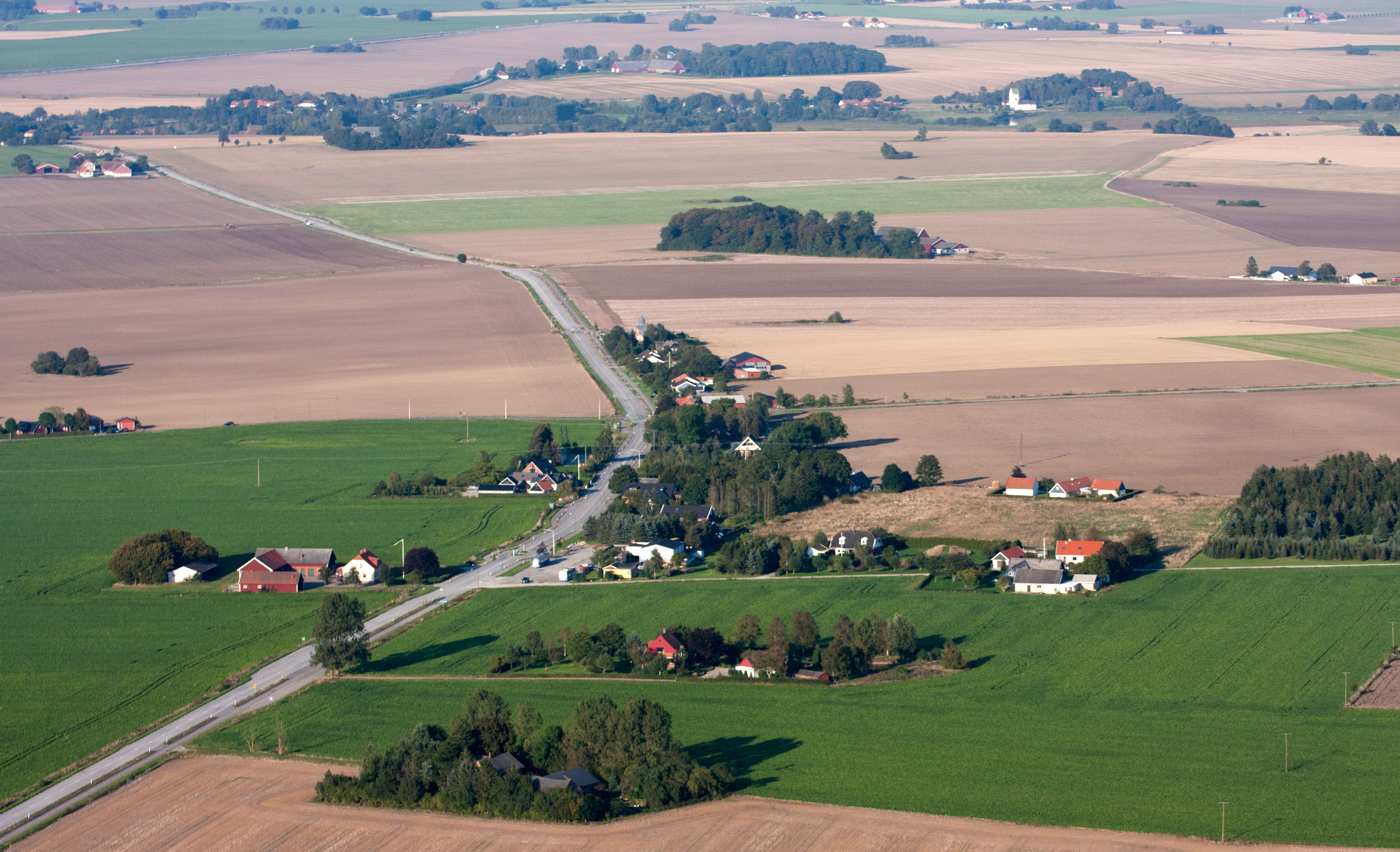
Aerial view of Scania near Lund

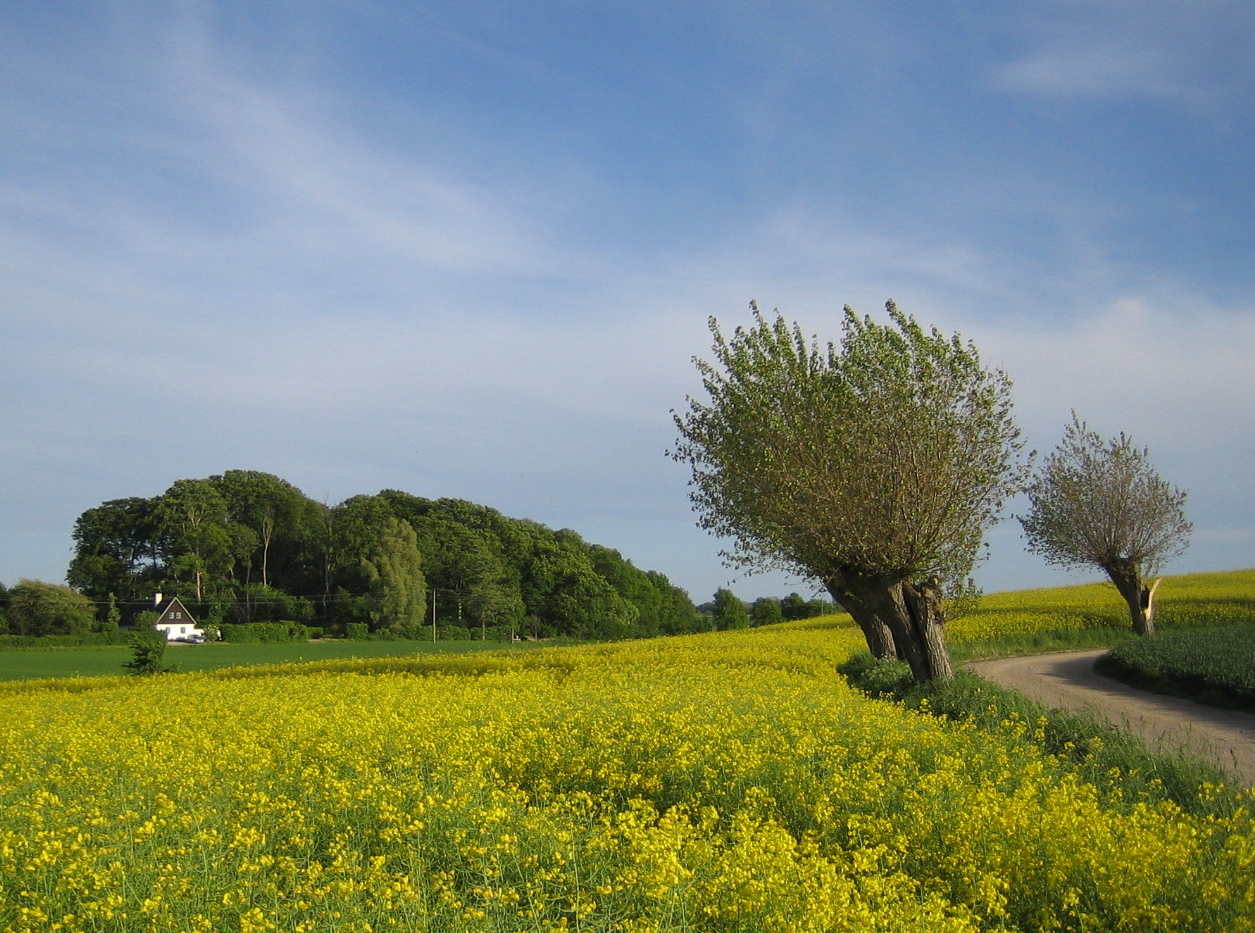
Pollarded willows and rapefields are typical for this area of Sweden.

Unlike some regions of Sweden, the Scanian landscape is generally not mountainous, though a few examples of uncovered cliffs can be found at Hovs Hallar, at Kullaberg, and on the island Hallands Väderö. With the exception of the lake-rich and densely forested northern parts (Göinge), the rolling hills in the north-west (the Bjäre and Kulla peninsulas) and the beech-wood-clad areas extending from the slopes of the horsts, a sizeable portion of Scania's terrain consists of plains. Its low profile and open landscape distinguish Scania from most other geographical regions of Sweden which consist mainly of waterway-rich, cool, mixed coniferous forests, boreal taiga and alpine tundra. The province has several lakes but there are relatively few compared to Småland, the province directly to the north. Stretching from the north-western to the south-eastern parts of Scania is a belt of deciduous forests following the Linderödsåsen ridge and previously marking the border between Malmöhus County and Kristianstad County. The much denser fir forests — typical of the greater part of Sweden — are only found in the north-eastern Göinge parts of Scania along the border with the forest-dominated province of Småland. While the landscape typically has a slightly sloping profile, in some places, such as north of Malmö, the terrain is almost completely flat.

The narrow lakes with a long north to south extent, which are very common further north, are lacking in Scania. The largest lake, Ivösjön in the north-east, has similarities with the lakes further north, but has a different shape. All other lakes tend to be round, oval or of more complex shape and also lack any specific cardinal direction. Ringsjön, in the middle of the province, is the largest of such lakes. In the winter, some smaller lakes east of Lund often attract young Eurasian sea eagles (Haliaeetus albicilla).

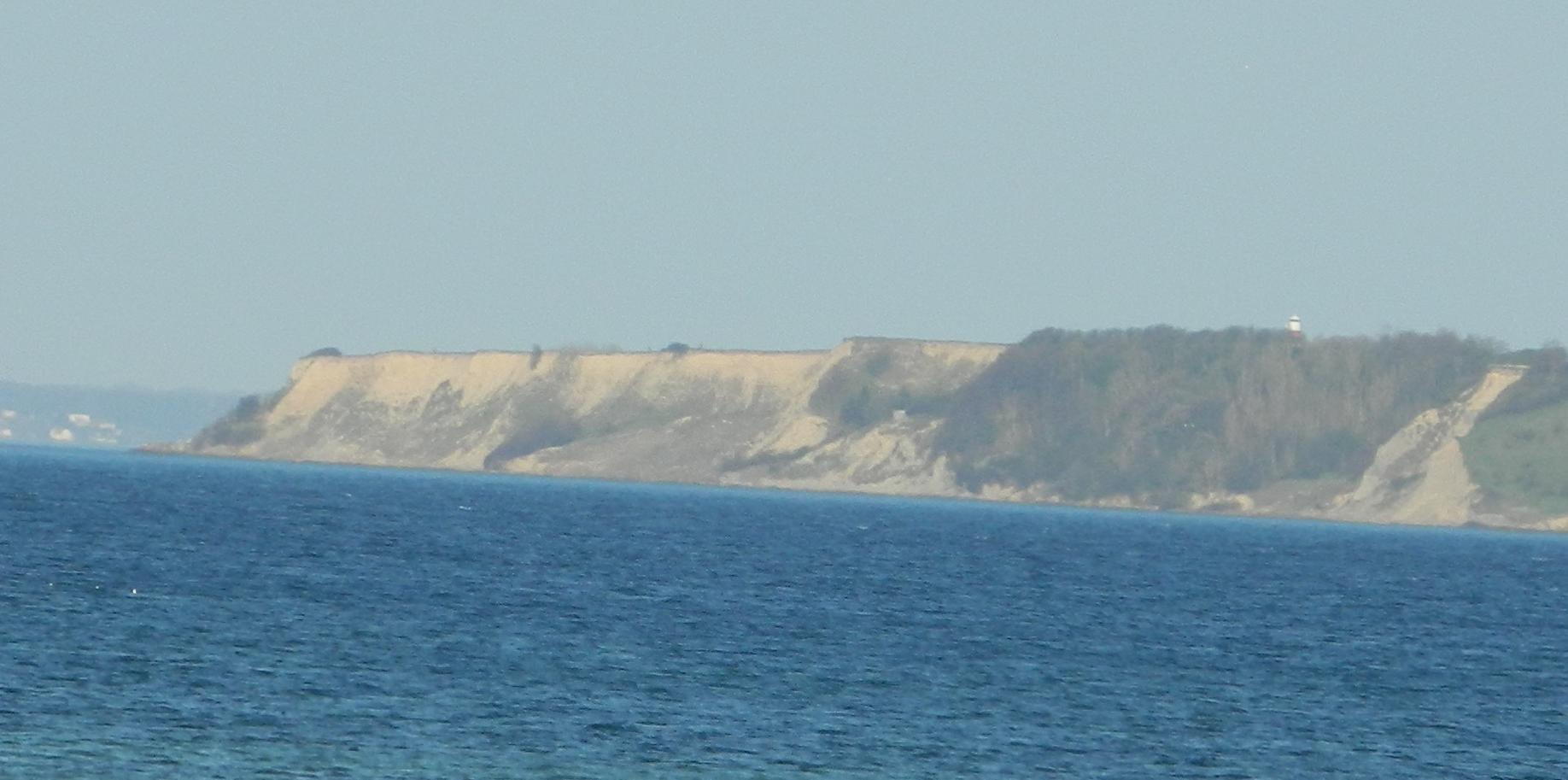
Typical Scanian coastline, here southern peak of Ven island in Øresund. The yellow colour indicates sand rather than chalk, while white colour at similar cliffs indicates chalk rather than sand

Where the sea meets higher parts of the sloping landscape, cliffs emerge. Such cliffs are white if the soil has a high content of chalk. Good examples of such coastlines exist at the southern side of Ven, between the towns of Helsingborg and Landskrona, and in parts of the south and south-east coasts. In other Swedish provinces, steep coastlines usually reveal primary rock instead.

The two major plains, Söderslätt in the south-west and Österlen in the south-east, consist of highly fertile agricultural land. The yield per unit area is higher than in any other region in Sweden. The Scanian plains are an important resource for Sweden since 25–95% of the total production of various types of cereals come from the region. Almost all Swedish sugar beet comes from Scania; the plant needs a long vegetation period. The same applies also to maize, peas and rape (grown for its oil), although these plants are less imperative in comparison with sugar beets. The soil is among the most fertile in the world.

The Kullaberg Nature Preserve in northwest Scania is home to several rare species including spring vetchling, Lathyrus sphaericus.

=== Geology and geomorphology ===
[T]he present landscape is a mosaic of landforms shaped during widely different ages.

— Karna Lidmar-Bergström and co-workers.

The gross relief of Scania reflects more the preglacial development than the erosion and deposits caused by the Quaternary glaciers. In Swedish the word ås commonly refers to eskers, but major landmarks in Scania, such as Söderåsen, are horsts formed by tectonic inversion along the Sorgenfrei-Tornquist Zone in the late Cretaceous. The Scanian horsts run in a north-west to south-east direction, marking the southwest border of Fennoscandia. Tectonic activity of the Sorgenfrei-Tornquist Zone during the break-up of Pangaea in the Jurassic and Cretaceous epochs led to the formation of hundreds of small volcanoes in central Scania. Remnants of the volcanoes are still visible today. Parallel with volcanism a hilly peneplain formed in northeastern Scania due to weathering and erosion of basement rocks. The kaolinite formed by this weathering can be observed at Ivö Klack. In the Campanian age of the Late Cretaceous a sea level rise led to the complete drowning of Scania. Subsequently, marine sediments buried old surfaces preserving the rocky shores and hilly terrain of the day.

In the Paleogene period southern Sweden was at a lower position relative to sea level but was likely still above it as it was covered by sediments. Rivers flowing over the South Småland peneplain flowed also across Scania which was at the time covered by thick sediments. As the relative sea level sank and much of Scania lost its sedimentary cover antecedent rivers begun to incise the Söderåsen horst forming valleys. During deglaciation these valleys likely evacuated large amounts of melt-water. The relief of Scania's south-western landscape was formed by the accumulation of thick Quaternary sediments during the Quaternary glaciations.

=== Vegetation ===
The vast majority of Scania belongs to the European hardwood vegetation zone, a considerable part of which is now agricultural rather than the original forest. This zone covers Europe west of Poland and north of the Alps, and includes the British Isles, northern and central France and the countries and regions to the south and southeast of the North Sea up to Denmark. A smaller north-eastern part of Scania is part of the pinewood vegetation zone, in which spruce grows naturally. Within the larger part, pine may grow together with birch on sandy soil. The most common tree is beech. Other common trees are willow, oak, ash, alder and elm (which until the 1970s formed a few forests but now is heavily infected by the elm disease). Also rather southern trees like walnut tree, chestnut and hornbeam can be found. In parks horse chestnut, lime and maple are commonly planted as well. Common fruit trees planted in commercial orchards and private gardens include several varieties of apple, pear, cherry and plum; strawberries are commercially cultivated in many locations across the province. Examples of wild berries grown in domesticated form are blackberry, raspberry, cloudberry (in the north-east), blueberry, wild strawberry and loganberry.

=== National parks ===
Three of the 29 National parks of Sweden are situated in Scania.

- Dalby Söderskog
- Stenshuvud
- Söderåsen

=== Extremes ===
- Southernmost point: Smygehuk, Trelleborg Municipality, (55° 20' N) (also the southernmost point of Sweden)
- Northernmost point: Gränsholmen, Osby Municipality
- Westernmost point: Kulla udd, Höganäs Municipality
- Easternmost point: Nyhult, Bromölla Municipality
- Highest point: Highest peak of Söderåsen, 212 metres
- Lowest spot: Kristianstad, −2.7 metres (also the lowest spot in all of Sweden)
- Largest lake: Ivösjön, 55 km^{2}
- Largest island: Ven, 7.5 km^{2}

=== Climate ===
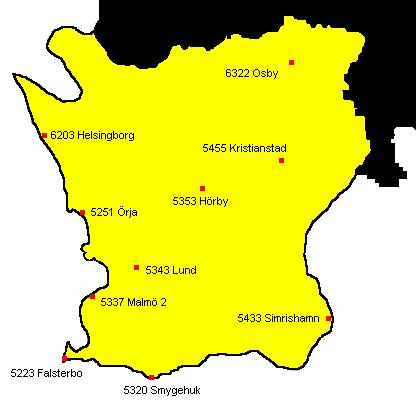
Location of some SMHI temperature stations in Scania

Scania has the mildest climate in Sweden, but there are some local differences.

The table shows average temperatures in degrees Celsius at ten Swedish Meteorological and Hydrological Institute (SMHI) weather stations in Scania and three stations further north for comparison issues. Average temperature in this case means the average of the temperature taken throughout both day and night unlike the more usual daily maximum or minimum average. This is done for specific measured periods of thirty years. The last period began at 1 January 1961 and ended at 31 December 1990. The current such period started at 1 January 1991 and will end by 31 December 2020. At that time it will be possible to with a high degree of mathematical certainty to measure possible climate changes, by comparing two separate periods of 30 years with each other.

st.no	Station	Approx Latitude	Jan	Feb	Mar	Apr	May	Jun	Jul	Aug	Sep	Oct	Nov	Dec	Annual
5320	Smygehuk	55	−0.1	−0.3	1.4	4.6	9.4	14.0	15.6	15.7	12.9	9.4	5.2	1.7	7.5
5223	Falsterbo	55	0.3	0.0	1.7	5.1	10.1	14.7	16.4	16.4	13.7	10.0	5.7	2.3	8.0
5337	Malmö 2	55.5	0.1	0.0	2.2	6.4	11.6	15.8	17.1	16.8	13.6	9.8	5.3	1.9	8.4
5433	Simrishamn	55.5	−0.1	−0.3	1.7	4.9	9.5	14.6	16.3	16.1	13.1	9.2	4.9	1.6	7.6
5251	Örja	55.5	0.0	0.0	2.2	6.1	11.5	15.3	16.5	16.7	13.5	9.4	5.2	2.2	8.2
6203	Helsingborg	56	0.6	−0.1	2.0	6.0	11.2	15.3	16.7	16.6	13.6	9.9	5.2	1.8	8.3
5343	Lund	55.5	−0.6	−0.5	2.0	6.0	11.5	15.4	16.8	16.5	13.1	9.1	4.5	1.1	7.9
5353	Hörby	55.5	−1.6	−1.5	1.0	5.4	10.4	14.4	15.5	15.3	11.9	8.0	3.6	0.1	6.9
5455	Kristianstad	55.5	−1.0	−1.0	1.4	5.2	10.3	14.7	16.1	15.7	12.3	8.5	4.0	0.6	7.2
6322	Osby	56	−2.2	−2.1	0.6	5.0	10.5	14.4	15.5	14.9	11.3	7.4	2.8	−0.7	6.5
	For comparison, some northern locations within Sweden														
9749	Stockholm Arlanda	60	−4.4	−4.6	-1.0	4.0	10.2	14.9	16.3	15.2	10.8	6.4	1.2	-2.9	5.5
12731	Sundsvall	62.5	−9.0	−7.9	−3.1	2.0	7.8	13.4	15.3	14.0	9.4	4.5	−2.0	−6.7	3.1
16268	Luleå	66	−11.5	−10.7	−6.0	0.1	6.4	13.0	15.5	13.6	8.3	3.0	−4.0	−9.0	1.6

All three of the northern locations are at low altitude and fairly close to the Baltic Sea.

Compared with locations further north, the Scanian climate differs primary by being far less cold during the winter and in having longer springs and autumns. While the July temperatures does not differ much (see table above).

The highest temperature ever recorded in the province is 36.0 °C (97 °F) (Ängelholm, 30 July 1947) and the lowest ever recorded is −34 °C (−29 °F) (Stehag, 26 January 1942) Temperatures below −15 °C (5 °F) are relatively rare even at night, while summer temperatures above 30 °C (86 °F) occurs once in a while every summer. Precipitation is spread fairly evenly, both across the province and during the year.

Slightly more precipitation falls during July and August than during the other months.

== Population ==
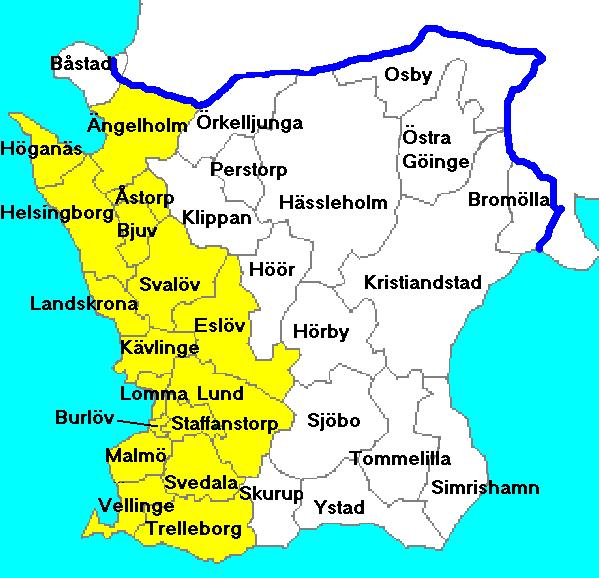
Map of the 33 municipalities of Scania. The western, yellow coloured municipalities, close to Øresund, have much higher population densities than the eastern ones

Scania is divided into 33 municipalities with population and land surface as the table below shows. There is a large population difference between the western Scania, that is located by, or close to Øresund sea compared to the middle and eastern parts of the province.

Population of Scania by municipality
Municipality	Population (April 2013)	Land area (km2)	Population density (/km2)
Municipalities that have a coast on Øresund or border a municipality that does (in yellow on the map)
Bjuv	14,813	115.3	128.5
Burlöv	17,079	18.9	903.7
Eslöv	31,761	419.1	75.8
Helsingborg	132,254	344.0	384.4
Höganäs	24,986	150.8	165.7
Kävlinge	29,513	152.6	193.4
Landskrona	42,751	148.3	288.3
Lomma	22,415	55.6	403.1
Lund	118,542	448.5	264.3
Malmö	328,494	166,3	1975.2
Staffanstorp	22,572	106.8	211.3
Svalöv	13,217	387.3	34.1
Svedala	20,039	218.1	91.9
Trelleborg	42,744	339.9	125.8
Vellinge	33,725	142.6	236.5
Åstorp	14,849	92.2	161.0
Ängelholm	39,836	420.1	95.1
Other municipalities (in white)
Bromölla	12,314	162.5	74.4
Båstad *	14,224	209.8	67.8
Hässleholm	50,171	1268.5	39.6
Hörby	14,882	419.4	35.5
Höör	15,591	290.9	53.6
Klippan	16,741	374.3	44.7
Kristianstad	80,854	1246.3	64.9
Osby	12,704	576.2	22.0
Perstorp	7,089	158.8	44.6
Simrishamn	18,950	391.4	48.4
Sjöbo	18,359	492.2	37.3
Skurup	14,997	193.6	77.5
Tomelilla	12,913	395.9	32.6
Ystad	28,562	350.1	81.6
Örkelljunga	9,640	319.6	30.1
Östra Göinge	13,609	432.0	31.5

^{*} A small part of Båstad municipality is located within the neighbouring province of Halland, this includes the village Östra Karup and some area around it, around 500 people live in Båstad municipality, but beyond the historical boundaries of the Scanian province.

- The western part of Scania (yellow on the map and close to the Øresund sea) covers 3201.3 km^{2} of land, and had (in April 2013) 925,982 inhabitants, almost 290 inhabitants/km^{2}
- The other municipalities cover 7281.3 km^{2}of land, and had at the same time only 341,009 inhabitants or 47 inhabitants/km^{2}
- The same figures for the entire province are 10482.6 km^{2}, 1,266,991 inhabitants and 121 inhabitants/km^{2}

These figures can be compared with around to 21 inhabitants per km^{2} for entire Sweden.

=== Population around Øresund ===
Western Scania has a high population density, not only by Scandinavian standards but also by average European standards, at close to 300 inhabitants per square kilometre. But the Danish Copenhagen region at north-east Zealand, on the other side of Øresund Sea, is even more densely populated. The north-east part of Zealand (or the Danish Region Hovedstaden without the Baltic island of Bornholm) has a population density of 878 inhabitants/km^{2}, most of Greater Copenhagen included.

By adding the population of western Scania to the same of Metropolitan area of Copenhagen, then close to 3 million people live around the Øresund sea, within a maximum distance from Øresund of 25 to 30 kilometres, at a land surface of approx. 6100 km^{2} (approx 460 inhabitants/km^{2}). This is in many ways a better measurement of describing the area around Øresund than what the far wider Øresund Region constitutes, as the latter includes also eastern Scania (whose beaches are Baltic Sea ones and is far less populated) as well as all Denmark east of the Great Belt.

Regardless of counting a smaller area with higher population density or a larger one, the Øresund Strait is located in the largest metropolitan area in Scandinavia with Finland.

=== Cities ===
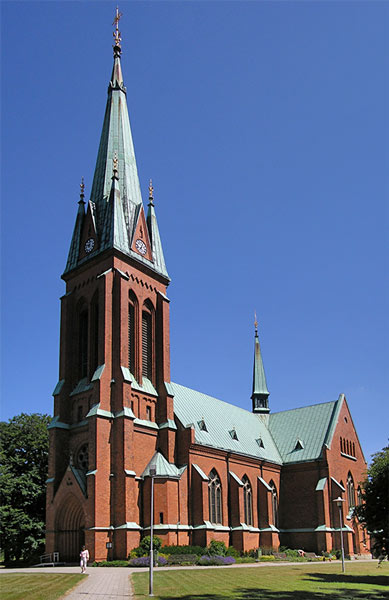
Eslöv church, built 1890 in Neo-Gothic style, sometimes known in Swedish as Eslöv Gothic.

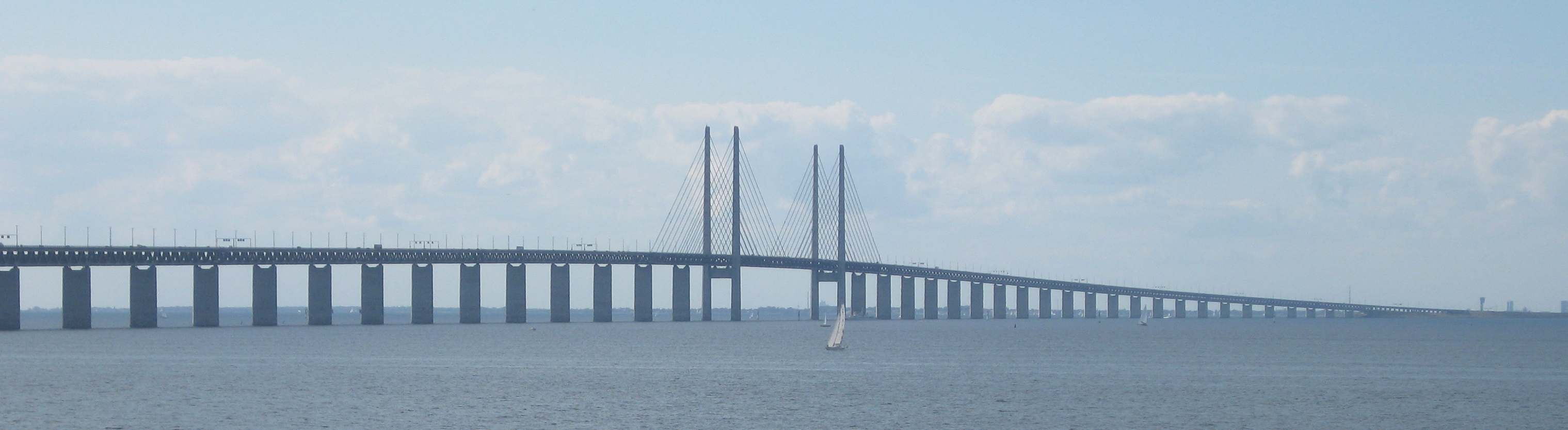
The Øresund Bridge

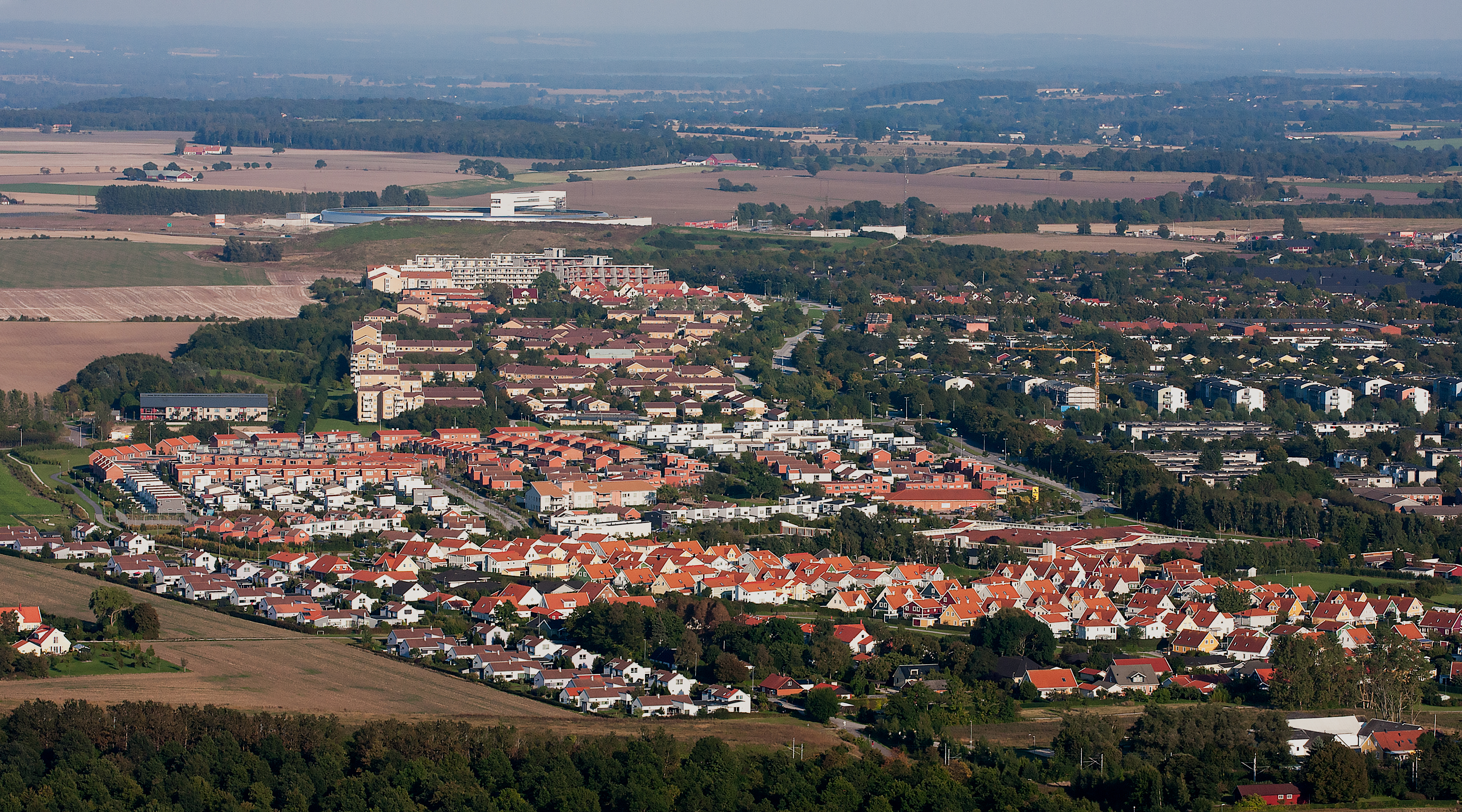
The Annehem neighborhood in Lund

In 1658, the following ten places in Scania were chartered and held town rights: Lund (since approximately 990), Helsingborg (1085), Falsterbo (approximately 1200), Ystad (approximately 1200), Skanör (approximately 1200), Malmö (approximately 1250), Simrishamn (approximately 1300), Landskrona (1413), and Kristianstad (1622). Others had existed earlier, but lost their privileges. Ängelholm got new privileges in 1767, and in 1754, Falsterbo and Skanör were merged. The concept of municipalities was introduced in Sweden in 1863, making each of the towns a city municipality of its own. In the 19th and 20th centuries, four more municipalities were granted city status, Trelleborg (1867), Eslöv (1911), Hässleholm (1914) and Höganäs (1936). The system of city status was abolished in 1971.

Over 90% of Scania's population live in urban areas. In 2000, the Øresund Bridge – the longest combined road and rail bridge in Europe – linked Malmö and Copenhagen, making Scania's population part of a 3.6 million total population in the Øresund Region. In 2005, the region had 9,200 commuters crossing the bridge daily, the vast majority of them from Malmö to Copenhagen.

The following localities had more than 10,000 inhabitants in 2010.

1. Malmö, 280,415^{*}
2. Helsingborg, 97,122
3. Lund, 82,800
4. Kristianstad, 35,711
5. Landskrona, 30,499
6. Trelleborg, 28,290
7. Ängelholm, 23,240
8. Hässleholm, 18,500
9. Ystad, 18,350
10. Eslöv, 17,748
11. Staffanstorp, 14,808
12. Höganäs, 14,107
13. Kävlinge & Furulund, 13,200

=== Population development ===
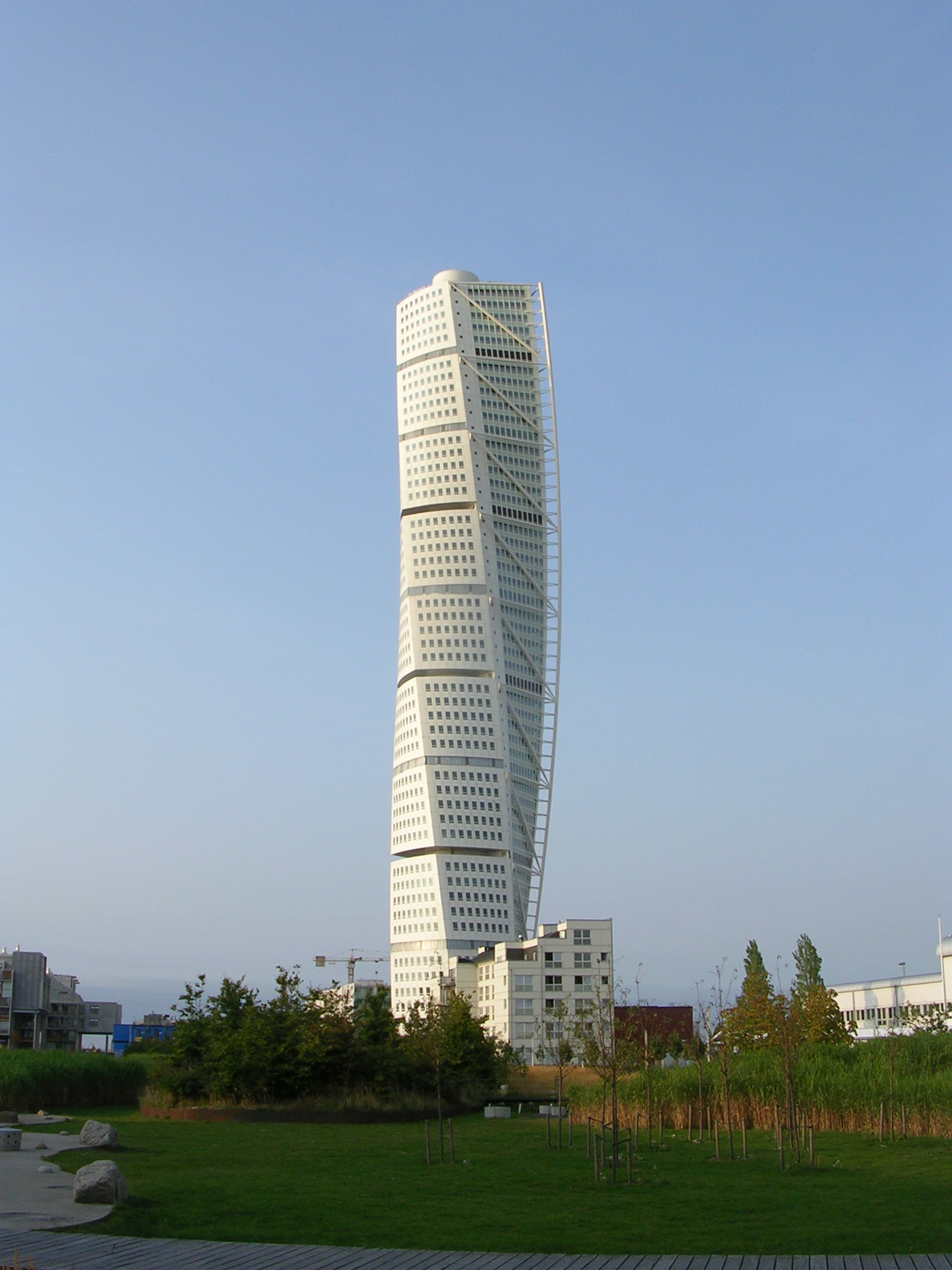
The Turning Torso in Malmö, the second tallest building in Sweden.

It has been estimated that around 1570, Scania had about 110,000 inhabitants. But before the plague in the middle of the 14th century the population of all Danish territory east of Øresund (Scania, Island of Bornholm, Blekinge and Halland) may have exceeded 250,000, a peak which was only recovered (and subsequently, surpassed) several decades into Swedish rule.

The figures here are from two different sources.

Year	Population	Year	Population	Year	Population
1620	126,000	1820	312,000	1930	757,000
1699	142,000	1830	350,000	1940	778,000
1718	152,000	1840	388,000	1950	843,000
1735	180,000	1850	443,000	1960	882,000
1750	197,000	1860	494,000	1970	983,000
1760	202,000	1870	538,000	1980	1,023,000
1772	216,000	1880	580,000	1990	1,068,000
1780	231,000	1890	591,000	2000	1,129,000
1795	250,000	1900	628,000	2010	1,228,000
1800	259,000	1910	685,000	2015	1,303,600
1810	275,000	1920	728,000	2016	1,322,200

- 2015 data.

=== Hundreds ===
Scania was formerly divided into 23 hundreds.

== Culture ==
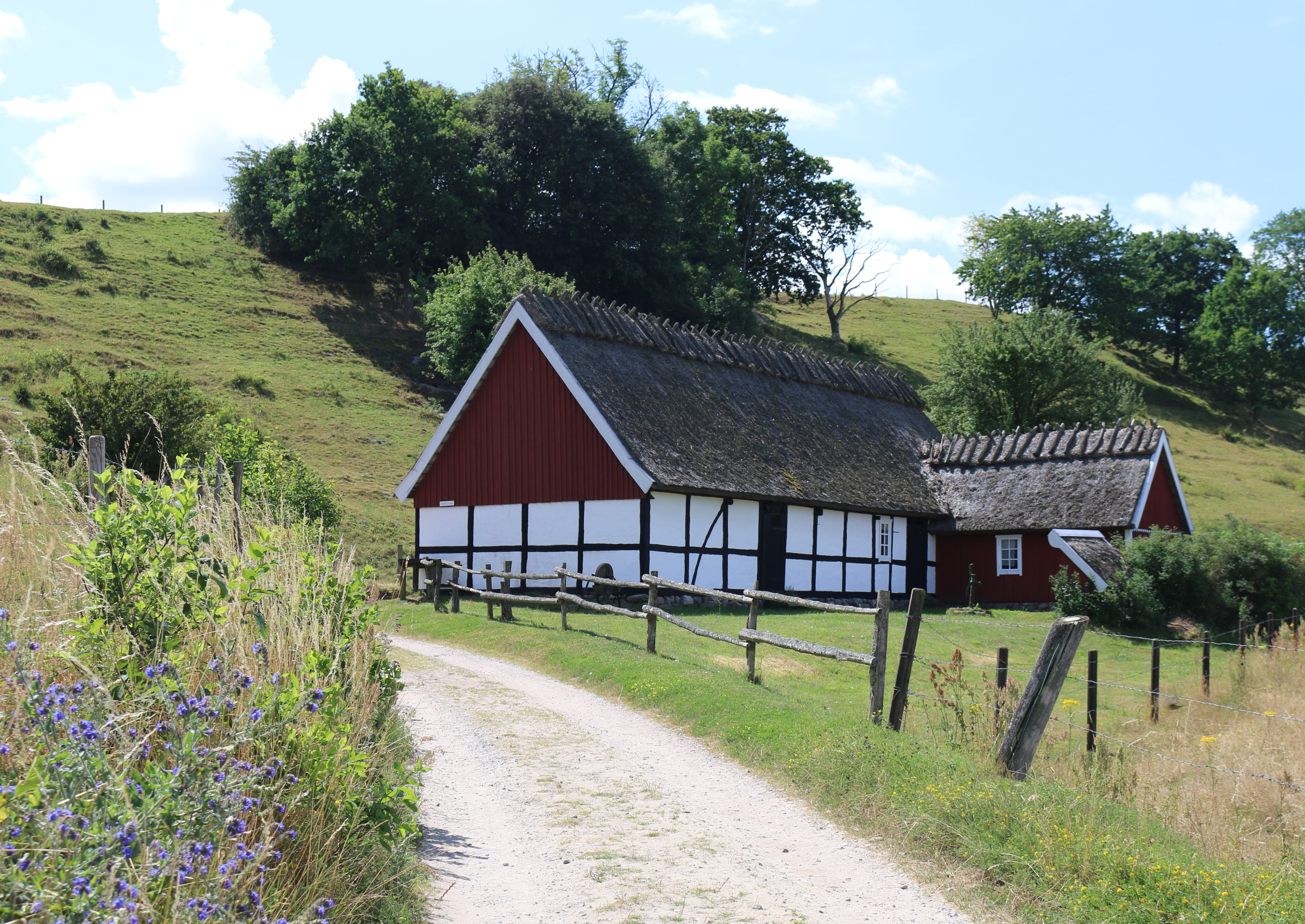
Traditional half-timbered farm house in Österlen

Scania's long-running and sometimes intense trade relations with other communities along the coast of the European continent through history have made the culture of Scania distinct from other geographical regions of Sweden. Its open landscape, often described as a colourful patchwork quilt of wheat and rapeseed fields, and the relatively mild climate at the southern tip of the Scandinavian Peninsula, have inspired many Swedish artists and authors to compare it to European regions like Provence in southern France and Zeeland in the Netherlands. Among the many authors who have described the "foreign" continental elements of the Scanian landscape, diet and customs are August Strindberg and Carl Linnaeus. In 1893 August Strindberg wrote about Scania: "In beautiful, large wave lines, the fields undulate down toward the lake; a small deciduous forest limits the coastline, which is given the inviting look of the Riviera, where people shall walk in the sun, protected from the north wind. [...] The Swede leaves the plains with a certain sense of comfort, because its beauty is foreign to him." In another chapter he states: "The Swedes have a history that is not the history of the South Scandinavians. It must be just as foreign as Vasa's history is to the Scanian."

In Ystad, singer-songwriter Michael Saxell's popular Scanian anthem Om himlen och Österlen (Of Heaven and Österlen), the flat, rolling hill landscape is described as appearing to be a little closer to heaven and the big, unending sky.

Scania's historical connection to Denmark, the vast fertile plains, the deciduous forests and the relatively mild climate make the province culturally and physically distinct from the emblematic Swedish cultural landscape of forests and small hamlets.

=== Architecture ===
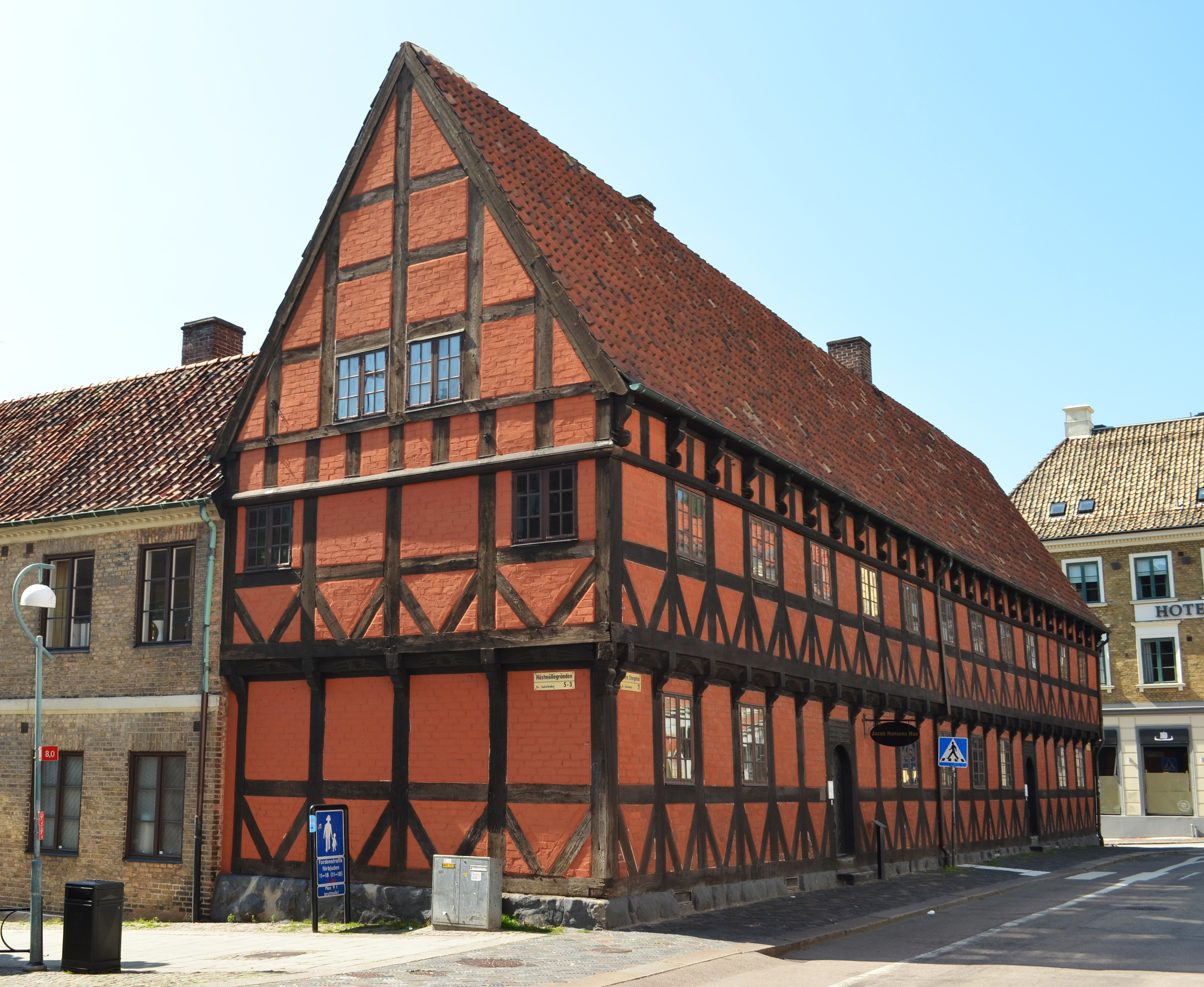
The house of magistrate Jacob Hansen in Helsingborg, built in 1641.

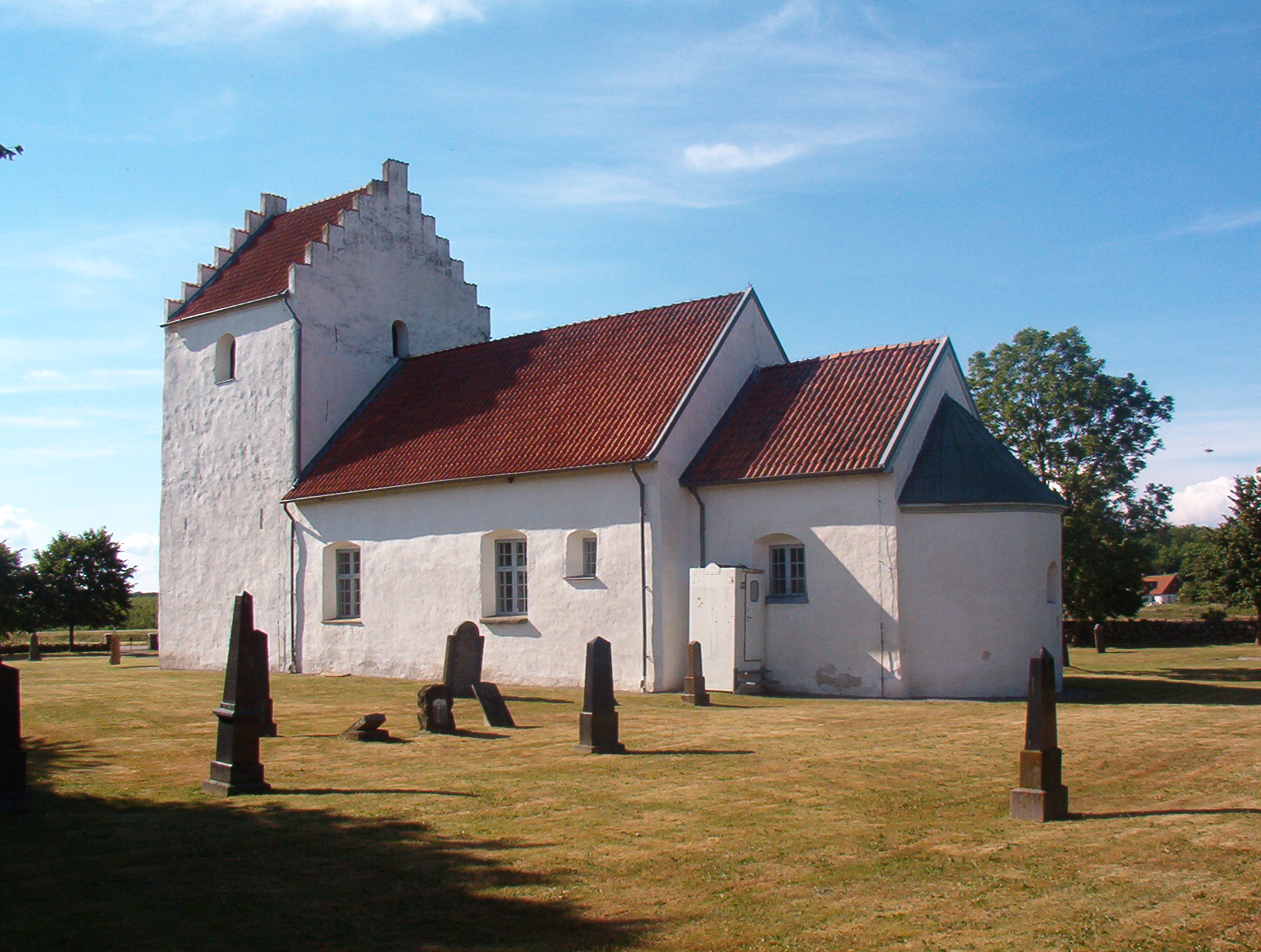
The Old Church of Södra Åsum in Sjöbo Municipality — a typical example of a medieval Danish Scanian church.

Traditional Scanian architecture is shaped by the limited availability of wood; it incorporates different applications of the building technique called half-timbering. In the cities, the infill of the façades consisted of bricks, whereas the country-side half-timbered houses had infill made of clay and straw. Unlike many other Scanian towns, the town of Ystad has managed to preserve a rather large core of its half-timbered architecture in the city center—over 300 half-timbered houses still exist today. Many of the houses in Ystad were built in the renaissance style that was common in the entire Øresund Region, and which has also been preserved in Elsinore (Helsingør). Among Ystad's half-timbered houses is the oldest such building in Scandinavia, Pilgrändshuset from 1480.

In Göinge, located in the northern part of Scania, the architecture was not shaped by a scarcity of wood, and the pre-17th-century farms consisted of graying, recumbent timber buildings around a small grass and cobblestone courtyard. Only a small number of the original Göinge farms remain today. During two campaigns, the first in 1612 by Gustav II Adolf and the second by Charles XI in the 1680s, entire districts were levelled by fire. In Örkened Parish, in what is now eastern Osby Municipality, the buildings were destroyed to punish the different villages for their protection of members of the Snapphane movement in the late 17th century. An original, 17th century Göinge farm, Sporrakulla Farm, has been preserved in a forest called Kullaskogen, a nature reserve close to Glimåkra in Östra Göinge. According to the local legend, the farmer saved the farm in the first raid of 1612 by setting a forest fire in front of it, making the Swedish troops believe that the farm had already been plundered and set ablaze.

A number of Scanian towns flourished during the Viking Age. The city of Lund is believed to have been founded by the Viking-king Sweyn Forkbeard. Scanian craftsmen and traders were prospering during this era and Denmark's first and largest mint was established in Lund. The first Scanian coins have been dated to 870 AD. The archaeological excavations performed in the city indicate that the oldest known stave church in Scania was built by Sweyn Forkbeard in Lund in 990. In 1103, Lund was made the archbishopric for all of Scandinavia.

Many of the old churches in today's Scanian landscape stem from the medieval age, although many church renovations, extensions and destruction of older buildings took place in the 16th and 19th century. From those that have kept features of the authentic style, it is still possible to see how the medieval, Romanesque or Renaissance churches of Danish Scania looked like. Many Scanian churches have distinctive crow-stepped gables and sturdy church porches, usually made of stone.

The first version of Lund Cathedral was built in 1050, in sandstone from Höör, on the initiative of Canute the Holy. The oldest parts of today's cathedral are from 1085, but the actual cathedral was constructed during the first part of the 12th century with the help of stone cutters and sculptors from the Rhine valley and Italy, and was ready for use in 1123. It was consecrated in 1145 and for the next 400 years, Lund became the ecclesiastical power center for Scandinavia and one of the most important cities in Denmark. The cathedral was altered in the 16th century by architect Adam van Düren and later by Carl Georg Brunius and Helgo Zetterwall.

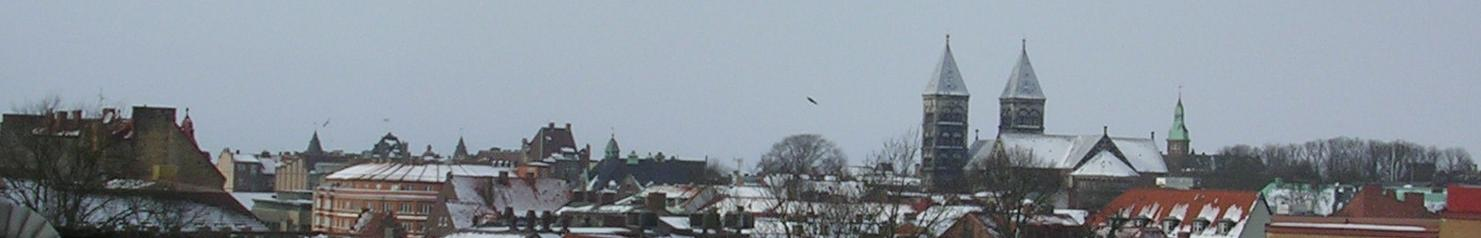
Lund skyline, with the Cathedral towers.

Scania also has churches built in the gothic style, such as Saint Petri Church in Malmö, dating from the early 14th century. Similar buildings can be found in all Hansa cities around the Baltic Sea (such as Helsingborg and Rostock). The parishes in the countryside did not have the means for such extravagant buildings. Possibly the most notable countryside church is the ancient and untouched stone church in Dalby. It is the oldest stone church in Sweden, built around the same time as Lund cathedral. After the Lund Cathedral was built, many of the involved workers travelled around the province and used their acquired skills to make baptism fonts, paintings and decorations, and naturally architectural constructions.

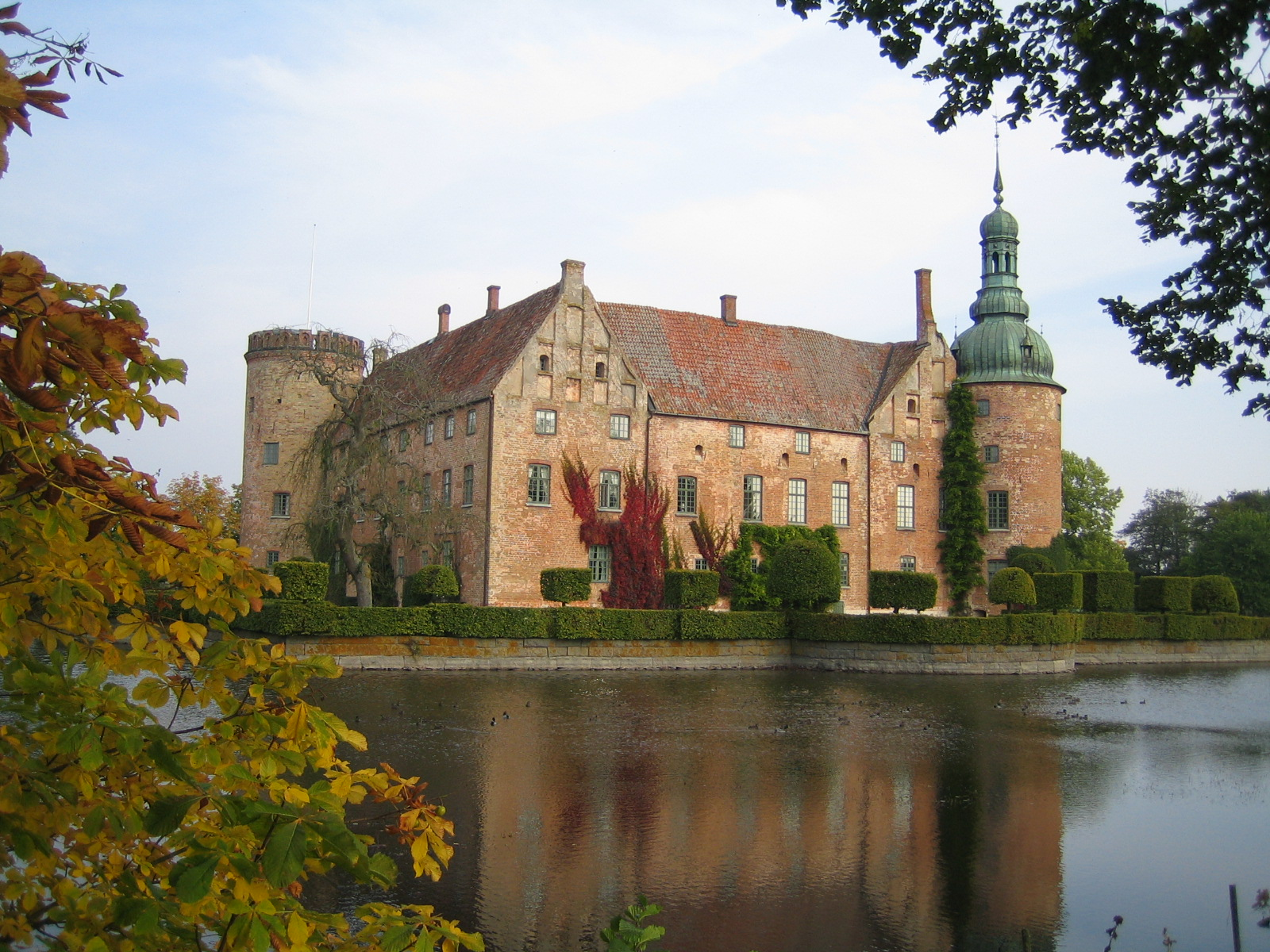
Vittskövle Castle.

Scania has 240 palaces and country estates—more than any other province in Sweden. Many of them received their current shape during the 16th century, when new or remodelled castles started to appear in greater numbers, often erected by the reuse of stones and material from the original 11th–15th-century castles and abbeys found at the estates. Between 1840 and 1900, the landed nobility in Scania built and rebuilt many of the castles again, often by modernizing previous buildings at the same location in a style that became typical for Scania. The style is a mixture of different architectural influences of the era, but frequently refers back to the style of the 16th-century castles of the Reformation era, a time when the large estates of the Catholic Church were made Crown property and the abbeys bartered or sold to members of the aristocracy by the Danish king. For many of the 19th century remodels, Danish architects were called in. According to some scholars, the driving force behind the use of historical Scanian architecture, as interpreted by 19th century Danish architects using Dutch Renaissance style, was a wish to refer back to an earlier era when the aristocracy had special privileges and political power in relation to the Danish king.

=== Language, literature, and art ===
Scanian dialects have various local native idioms and speech patterns, and realizes diphthongs and South Scandinavian uvular trill, as opposed to the supradental /r/-sound characteristic of spoken Standard Swedish. They are very similar to the dialect of Danish spoken in Bornholm, Denmark. The prosody of the Scanian dialects has more in common with German, Danish and Dutch (and sometimes also with English, although to a lesser extent) than with the prosody of central Swedish dialects.

Famous Scanian authors include Victoria Benedictsson, (1850–1888) from Domme, Trelleborg, who wrote about the inequality of women in the 19th century society, but who also authored regional stories about Scania, such as Från Skåne of 1884; Ola Hansson (1860–1925) from Hönsinge, Trelleborg; Vilhelm Ekelund (1880–1949) from Stehag, Eslöv; Fritiof Nilsson Piraten (1895–1972) from Vollsjö, Sjöbo; Hjalmar Gullberg (1898–1961) from Malmö; Artur Lundkvist (1906–1991) from Hagstad, Perstorp; Hans Alfredsson (1931–2017) and Jacques Werup (1945–2016), both from Malmö. Birgitta Trotzig (1929–2011) from Gothenburg has written several historic novels set in Scania, such as The Exposed of 1957, which describes life in 17th century Scania with a primitive country priest as its main character and the 1961 novel A Tale from the Coast, which recounts a legend about human suffering and is set in Scania in the 15th century. Gabriel Jönsson (1892–1984) from Ålabodarna, Landskrona.

A printing-house was established in the city of Malmö in 1528. It became instrumental in the propagation of new ideas and during the 16th century, Malmö became the center for the Danish reformation.

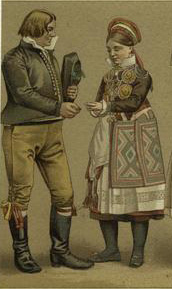
Traditional Scanian nuptial array according to Auguste Racinet, in Le costume historique.

Scanian culture, as expressed through the medium of textile art, has received international attention during the last decade. The art form, often referred to as Scanian Marriage Weavings, flourished from 1750 for a period of 100 years, after which it slowly vanished. Consisting of small textile panels mainly created for wedding ceremonies, the art is strongly symbolic, often expressing ideas about fertility, longevity and a sense of hope and joy. The Scanian artists were female weavers working at home, who had learned to weave at a young age, often in order to have a marriage chest filled with beautiful tapestries as a dowry.

According to international collectors and art scholars, the Scanian patterns are of special interest for the striking similarities with Roman, Byzantine and Asian art. The designs are studied by art historians tracing how portable decorative goods served as transmitters of art concepts from culture to culture, influencing designs and patterns along the entire length of the ancient trade routes. The Scanian textiles show how goods traded along the Silk Road brought Coptic, Anatolian, and Chinese designs and symbols into the folk art of far away regions like Scania, where they were reinterpreted and integrated into the local culture. Some of the most ancient designs in Scanian textile art are pairs of birds facing a tree with a "great bird" above, often symbolized simply by its wings. Regionally derived iconography include mythological Scanian river horses in red (Swedish: bäckahästar), with horns on their foreheads and misty clouds from their nostrils. The horse motif has been traced to patterns on 4th- and 5th-century Egyptian fabrics, but in Scanian art it is transformed to illustrate the Norse river horse of Scanian folklore.

== Dukes ==
The title of duke was reintroduced in Sweden in 1772 and since this time, Swedish princes have been created dukes of various provinces, although the titles are purely nominal.

The Dukes of Scania have been:

- Crown Prince Carl (from his birth in 1826 until he became king in 1859)
- Crown Prince Gustaf Adolf (from his birth in 1882 until he became king in 1950)
- Prince Oscar 2016–

From his marriage, in 1905, King Gustaf VI Adolf had his summer residence at Sofiero Palace in Helsingborg. He and his family spent their summers there, and the cabinet meetings held there during the summer months forced the ministers to arrive by night train from Stockholm. He died at Helsingborg Hospital in 1973.

== Sports ==
Football has always been the most popular arena and team sport within the province. Clubs are administered by Skånes Fotbollförbund.

Malmö FF has won Allsvenskan 23 times, Helsingborg IF 7 times and was one of the twelve clubs in the league's first season, 1924/25. Also Landskrona BoIS was among the twelve original clubs, but has never won. These three clubs are historically the most famous football clubs in Scania. But also IFK Malmö, Stattena IF, Råå IF (the latter two clubs are both from Helsingborg) as well as Trelleborgs FF have participated.

Handball is also a relatively popular team sport.

Ice hockey was for a long time thought of as a sport of northern Sweden, but has nevertheless became a popular attendance sport too. Malmö Redhawks has even become Swedish Champions twice, but also Rögle BK (from Ängelholm) have participated at the highest level of Swedish ice hockey during quite a lot of seasons.

Rugby league is played in Scania by the Skåne Crusaders who play in the Sweden Rugby League.

Tennis is associated with Båstad during the Swedish Open.

Scania has a large amount of golf courses, of which Barsebäck Golf & Country Club is the most well-known.

== See also ==
- 2008 Skåne County earthquake
- 460 Scania, an asteroid discovered in 1900
- "Sång till Skåne", a song about the province
- Skåneland

== General and cited references ==
- Albertsson, Rolf (2007). "Half-timbered houses". Malmö 1692 - a historical project. Malmö City Culture Department and Museum of Foteviken. Retrieved 16 January 2007.
- Anderson, Carl Edlund (1999). Formation and Resolution of Ideological Contrast in the Early History of Scandinavia. PhD dissertation, Department of Anglo-Saxon, Norse & Celtic (Faculty of English), University of Cambridge, 1999.
- Björk, Gert and Henrik Persson. "Fram för ett öppet och utåtriktat Skåne". Sydsvenskan, 20 May 2000. Reproduced by FSF. (In Swedish). Retrieved 3 April 2008.
- Bjurklint Rosenblad, Kajsa (2005). Scenografi för ett ståndsmässigt liv: adelns slottsbyggande i Skåne 1840-1900. Malmö: Sekel, 2005. ISBN 978-91-975222-3-6.
- Bonney, Richard (1995). Economic Systems and State Finance. Oxford University Press. ISBN 978-0-19-820545-6.
- Craig, David J. (2003). "Monument to Love". Boston University Bridge, 29 August 2003,• Vol. VII, No. 1. Retrieved 2 April 2008.
- Danish National Archives (2006). Lensregnskaberne 1560-1658. (In Danish). Retrieved 20 October 2006.
- City of Lund (2006).Touchdowns in the History of Lund. Retrieved 10 January 2006.
- Gårding, Eva (1974). "Talar skåningarna svenska". Svenskans beskrivning. Ed. Christer Platzack. Lund: Institutionen för nordiska språk, 1973. (In Swedish)
- Germundsson, Tomas (2005). "Regional Cultural Heritage versus National Heritage in Scania's Disputed National Landscape." International Journal of Heritage Studies, Vol. 11, No. 1, March 2005. ISSN 1470-3610.
- Hansen, Viveka (1997). Swedish Textile Art: Traditional Marriage Weavings from Scania. Nour Foundation: 1997. ISBN 978-1-874780-07-6.
- Hauberg, P. (1900). Myntforhold og Udmyntninger i Danmark indtil 1146. D. Kgl. Danske Vidensk. Selsk. Skr., 6. Række, historisk og filosofisk Afd. V. I., Chapter III: Danmarks Mynthistorie indtil 1146, and Chapter V: Myntsteder, Gladsaxe Gymnasium. (In Danish). Retrieved 10 January 2007.
- Haugen, Einar (1976). The Scandinavian Languages: An Introduction to Their History. Cambridge, Massachusetts: Harvard University Press, 1976.
- Helle, Knut, ed. (2003). The Cambridge History of Scandinavia. Cambridge University Press, 2003. ISBN 978-0-521-47299-9.
- Hogan, C.M. (2004). Kullaberg environmental analysis. Lumina Technologies, Aberdeen Library Archives, Aberdeen, Scotland, 17 July 2004.
- Jespersen, Knud J. V. (2004) . A History of Denmark. Palgrave Macmillan. ISBN 978-0-333-65917-5.
- Keelan, Major Andrew and Wendy Keelan (2006). The Khalili Collection. The Khalili Family Trust. Retrieved 1 April 2008.
- Lidmar-Bergström, Karna and Jens-Ove Näslund (2005). "Uplands and Lowlands in Southern Sweden". The Physical Geography of Fennoscandia. Ed. Matti Seppälä. Oxford University Press, 2005. ISBN 978-0-19-924590-1.
- Lindquist, Herman (1995). Historien om Sverige – storhet och fall. Norstedts Förlag, 2006. ISBN 978-91-1-301535-4. (In Swedish).
- Linnaeus, Carl (1750). Skånska resa. (In Swedish).
- Lund University School of Aviation (2005). Ljungbyhed airport - ESTL. Retrieved 22 January 2007.
- Lundström, Lena (2003). "Vattenväsen i väverskans händer". Vårt Trelleborg, 2:2003. (In Swedish).
- Malmö Public Library (2005). Litteraturhistoria, Malmö. Infotek Öresund, 4 November 2005. (In Swedish).
- Nevéus, Clara and Bror Jacques de Wærn (1992). Ny svensk vapenbok. Riksarkivet 1992. (In Swedish)
- Olin, Martin (2005). "Royal Galleries in Denmark and Sweden around 1700". Kungliga rum – maktmanifestation och distribution. Historikermöte 2005, Uppsala University. Retrieved 2 April 2008.
- Olwig, Kenneth R. (2005). "Introduction: The Nature of Cultural Heritage, and the Culture of Natural Heritage—Northern Perspectives on a Contested Patrimony". International Journal of Heritage Studies, Vol. 11, No. 1, March 2005.
- Oresundstid (2008). "The Swedification of Scania", "Renaissance Houses: Half-timbered houses". Retrieved 2 April 2008.
- Österberg, Klas (2001). Forest - Geographical Regions Archived 30 September 2007 at the Wayback Machine. The Swedish Environmental Protection Agency, 25 January 2001. Retrieved 4 November 2006.
- Østergård, Uffe (1997). "The Geopolitics of Nordic Identity – From Composite States to Nation States". The Cultural Construction of Norden. Øystein Sørensen and Bo Stråth (eds.), Oslo: Scandinavian University Press 1997.
- Peter, Laurence (2006). "Bridge shapes new Nordic hub". BBC News, 14 September 2006. Retrieved 20 October 2006.
- Region Skåne (2007). Municipalities in Skåne, Democracy-Increased autonomy.What is typical Skåne?. Retrieved 22 January 2007.
- Sawyer, Birgit; Sawyer, Peter H. (1993). Medieval Scandinavia: from Conversion to Reformation, Circa 800–1500. University of Minnesota Press. ISBN 978-0-8166-1739-5.
- SCB (2007). "Skördar". Jordbruksstatistisk årsbok 2006. Statiska Centralbyrån. (In Swedish). Retrieved 10 January 2007.
- Skåne Regional Council (1999). Newsletter., No. 2, 1999.
- Stadin, Kekke (2005). "The Masculine Image of a Great Power: Representations of Swedish imperial power c. 1630–1690". Scandinavian Journal of History, Vol. 30, No. 1. March 2005, pp. 61–82. ISSN 0346-8755.
- Stiftelsen för fritidsområden i Skåne (2006).Skåneleden: 6B. Breanäsleden (In Swedish), Information about the Skaneled Trails. The Foundation for Recreational Areas in Skåne and Region Skåne. Retrieved 11 April 2008.
- Strindberg, August (1893). "Skånska landskap med utvikningar". Prosabitar från 1890-talet. Bonniers, Stockholm, 1917. (In Swedish).
- SAOB (2008). Skåneland.(In Swedish). Retrieved 2 April 2008.
- Sorens, Jason (2005). "The Cross-Sectional Determinants of Secessionism in Advanced Democracies". Comparative Political Studies. 38 (3): 304–326. doi:10.1177/0010414004272538. S2CID 145636533.
- Språk- och Folkminnesinstitutet (2003). Svenskt Ortnamnslexikon. Uppsala, 2003. (In Swedish)
- Tägil, Sven (2000). "Regions in Europe – a historical perspective". In Border Regions in Comparison. Ed. Hans-Åke Persson. Studentlitteratur, Lund. ISBN 978-91-44-01858-4.
- Terra Scaniae (2008). Skånes län efter 1658, Hårdare försvenskning, "Kuppförsök mot svenskarna 1658", "Lunds Domkyrka", 1600-talet, Generalguvernörens uppgifter.(In Swedish). Retrieved 2 April 2008.
- Upton, Anthony F. (1998). Charles XI and Swedish Absolutism, 1660–1697. Cambridge University Press, 1998. ISBN 978-0-521-57390-0.
- Vinge, Louise (ed.) Skånes litteraturhistoria, Corona: Malmö, 1996–1997, Part I, ISBN 978-91-564-1048-2, and Part II, ISBN 978-91-564-1049-9. (In Swedish).
- Ystad Municipality (2007). Welcome to Ystad and "Pedestrian street". A walk through the centuries. Retrieved 16 January 2007.
