= Osby =

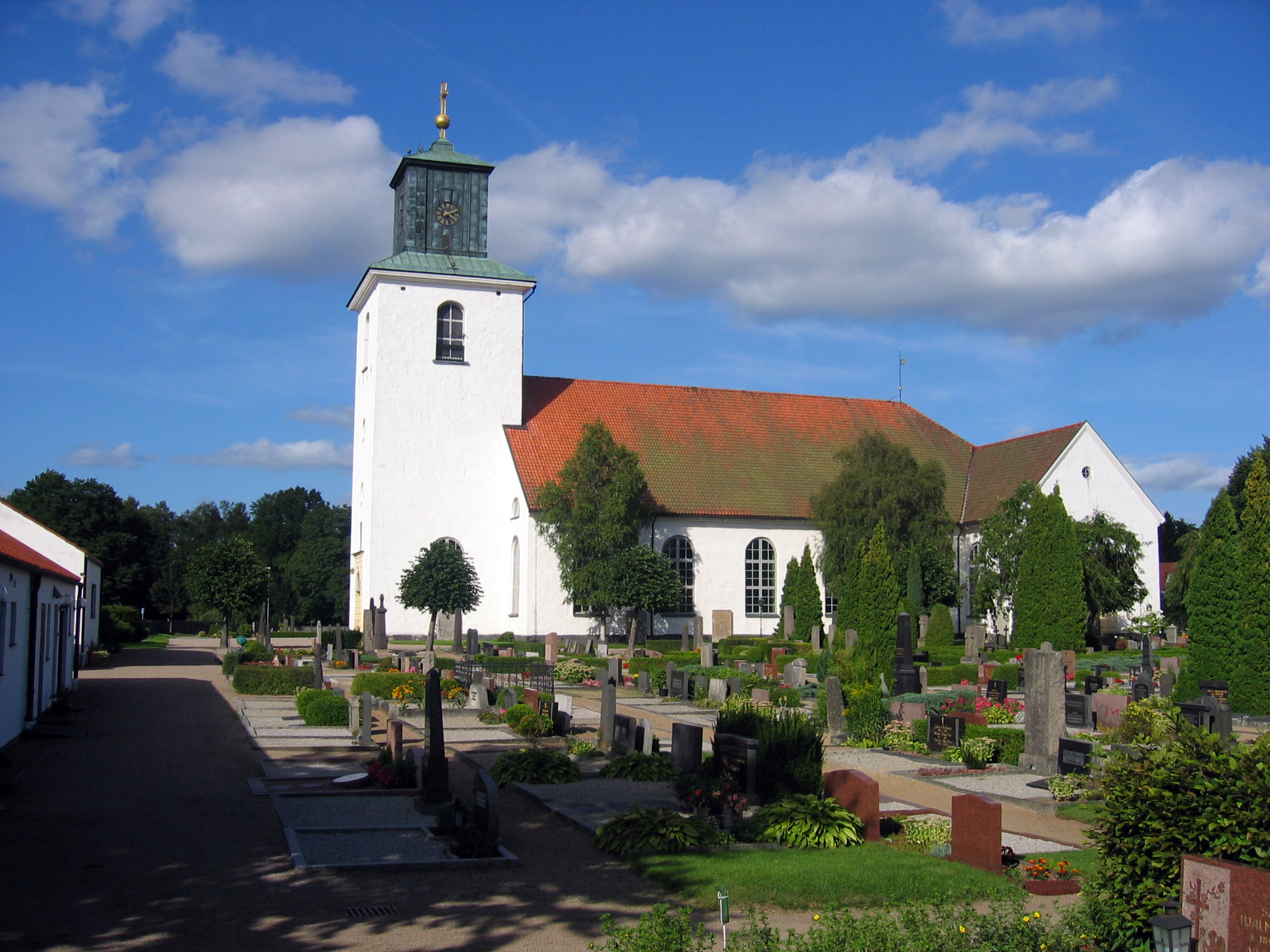
- Osby Church

- Coat of arms

- Location within Scania Location within Sweden Location within European Union
- Coordinates: 56°22′N 13°59′E
- Country: Sweden
- Province: Scania
- County: Scania County
- Municipality: Osby Municipality

Area
  - Total: 8.27 km^{2} (3.19 sq mi)

Population (31 December 2010)
  - Total: 7,157
  - Density: 866/km^{2} (2,240/sq mi)
- Time zone: UTC+1 (CET)
  - Summer (DST): UTC+2 (CEST)

Osby (Swedish pronunciation: [ˈûːsbʏ]) is a locality and the seat of Osby Municipality, Scania County, Sweden with 7,157 inhabitants in 2010 and 13,238 inhabitants in 2022. It is the birthplace of the toy manufacturer BRIO, whose museum, the BRIO Lekoseum, remains in the town.

Osby's history is tied to the arrival of the Southern Main Line railway in 1862. This development transformed Osby from a small farming village into a growing industrial hub, with sawmills, metal foundries, and other enterprises driving its expansion during the late 19th century and early 20th century.

== History ==
Osby's transformation from a rural village into a town is closely tied to the arrival of the Southern Main Line railway in 1862, a pivotal moment in the town's history. Before the railway, Osby was a quiet area dominated by farmland, with its center located northeast of the Osby church in what is now known as Gamleby. The village housed around 300 residents, with Marklunda, a neighboring settlement to the east, serving as a hub for travel and trade along the Växjö–Kristianstad road. Agriculture and livestock farming were the main activities, with ironmongery acting as a second source of income for many farmers.

With the railway's opening, market activity shifted from Marklunda to Osby, and the town began to grow around the station. Early industries such as sawmills, a steam-powered tannery, and a metal foundry emerged, taking advantage of the region's abundant natural resources, including timber. By the late 19th century, Osby’s sawmills were thriving, with timber floating along the Helge River to supply local and regional markets.

The townscape featured houses with ornate woodwork and gardens lining new streets like Jernvägsgatan and Storgatan. By 1900, Osby's population had surpassed 1,000 residents, marking its transition into an urban center.

The entrepreneurial spirit of Osby’s residents played a key role in its growth. Innovators like Per Persson, who founded a metal foundry and even built a steamship for Osby Lake, exemplified this resourcefulness. This led to the establishment of numerous industries in the early 20th century, including the toy company BRIO, a torvströfabrik (peat moss factory), a foundry with a mechanical workshop, a steam sawmill, a gasworks and even educational institutions.

Some of this industrial development disappeared after World War I and gradually the landscape around Osby started changing. Previously open fields, pastures, and meadows have been replanted with coniferous forests. Many farmsteads have been shut down, with their buildings either abandoned or repurposed as holiday homes.

== Climate ==
Osby has an oceanic climate that retains a four-season characteristic. It has resemblances of moderate continental, with summers sometimes being very warm and winter lows dropping below freezing with regularity for a few months. Its southerly inland position has rendered it to be one of the few locations in the country that has reached 30 °C (86 °F) in May. In spite of this summer averages are rather cool when compared with adjacent coastal areas.

Climate data for Osby 2002–2018 (extremes since 1928; precipitation 1961-1990)
Month	Jan	Feb	Mar	Apr	May	Jun	Jul	Aug	Sep	Oct	Nov	Dec	Year
Record high °C (°F)	10.7 (51.3)	16.3 (61.3)	20.1 (68.2)	28.0 (82.4)	30.0 (86.0)	36.8 (98.2)	34.8 (94.6)	34.0 (93.2)	28.4 (83.1)	23.2 (73.8)	15.0 (59.0)	12.5 (54.5)	36.8 (98.2)
Mean maximum °C (°F)	7.2 (45.0)	7.9 (46.2)	14.1 (57.4)	20.4 (68.7)	25.4 (77.7)	27.0 (80.6)	29.5 (85.1)	27.9 (82.2)	23.3 (73.9)	17.1 (62.8)	11.7 (53.1)	8.5 (47.3)	30.2 (86.4)
Mean daily maximum °C (°F)	1.5 (34.7)	2.1 (35.8)	6.4 (43.5)	12.7 (54.9)	17.7 (63.9)	20.3 (68.5)	22.8 (73.0)	21.5 (70.7)	17.8 (64.0)	11.4 (52.5)	6.4 (43.5)	3.1 (37.6)	12.0 (53.6)
Daily mean °C (°F)	−0.7 (30.7)	−0.4 (31.3)	2.4 (36.3)	7.3 (45.1)	12.1 (53.8)	15.1 (59.2)	17.7 (63.9)	16.9 (62.4)	13.3 (55.9)	8.1 (46.6)	4.2 (39.6)	1.1 (34.0)	8.1 (46.6)
Mean daily minimum °C (°F)	−2.9 (26.8)	−2.9 (26.8)	−1.6 (29.1)	1.8 (35.2)	6.5 (43.7)	9.9 (49.8)	12.6 (54.7)	12.2 (54.0)	8.8 (47.8)	4.7 (40.5)	2.0 (35.6)	−1.0 (30.2)	4.2 (39.5)
Mean minimum °C (°F)	−13.6 (7.5)	−11.0 (12.2)	−9.6 (14.7)	−3.8 (25.2)	−0.2 (31.6)	4.8 (40.6)	7.9 (46.2)	6.7 (44.1)	1.7 (35.1)	−3.3 (26.1)	−6.0 (21.2)	−9.7 (14.5)	−16.1 (3.0)
Record low °C (°F)	−33.0 (−27.4)	−29.0 (−20.2)	−26.1 (−15.0)	−14.0 (6.8)	−7.0 (19.4)	−3.0 (26.6)	0.2 (32.4)	−0.2 (31.6)	−5.3 (22.5)	−11.0 (12.2)	−14.1 (6.6)	−24.1 (−11.4)	−33.0 (−27.4)
Average precipitation mm (inches)	69.7 (2.74)	51.4 (2.02)	40.9 (1.61)	38.6 (1.52)	60.9 (2.40)	76.5 (3.01)	88.6 (3.49)	79.6 (3.13)	55.3 (2.18)	80.5 (3.17)	69.4 (2.73)	70.5 (2.78)	781.9 (30.78)
Source 1: SMHI
Source 2: SMHI Monthly Data 2002–2018

== Transport ==
Osby is connected to the rest of Scania and to Småland by train and bus services provided by Skånetrafiken and Krösatågen. By car, Osby is accessible by the national road 15 from the east and west and by road 23 from the north and south.

== Notable people ==
- Magnus Åkerlund (born 1986) a professional ice hockey goaltender.
- Alexander Bergström (born 1986) is a professional ice hockey forward.
- Kikki Danielsson (born 1952) a country, dansband and pop singer.
- Viking Dahl (1895 – 1945) a composer, painter and author.
- Tuve Hasselquist (1816 – 1891) a Swedish American Lutheran minister and church leader.
- Carin Mannheimer (1934 – 2014) a dramatist, screenwriter, author and film director.
- Hampus Nilsson (born 1990) a footballer who plays as a goalkeeper.
- Max Nilsson (born 1980) a racing driver.
- Åsa Persson (born 1983) a former competitive figure skater.
- Malin Persson (born 1979) a model.
- Ragnar Svensson (born 1934) a former heavyweight Greco-Roman wrestler who won a silver medal at the 1963 World Championships.

== See also ==
- Romero Osby (born 1990), American basketball player for Maccabi Kiryat Gat of the Israeli Basketball Premier League
