= Killeberg =

- Location within Scania Location within Sweden Location within European Union
- Coordinates: 56°28′N 14°05′E
- Country: Sweden
- Province: Scania
- County: Skåne County
- Municipality: Osby Municipality

Area
  - Total: 1.05 km^{2} (0.41 sq mi)

Population (31 December 2010)
  - Total: 585
  - Density: 557/km^{2} (1,440/sq mi)
- Time zone: UTC+1 (CET)
  - Summer (DST): UTC+2 (CEST)

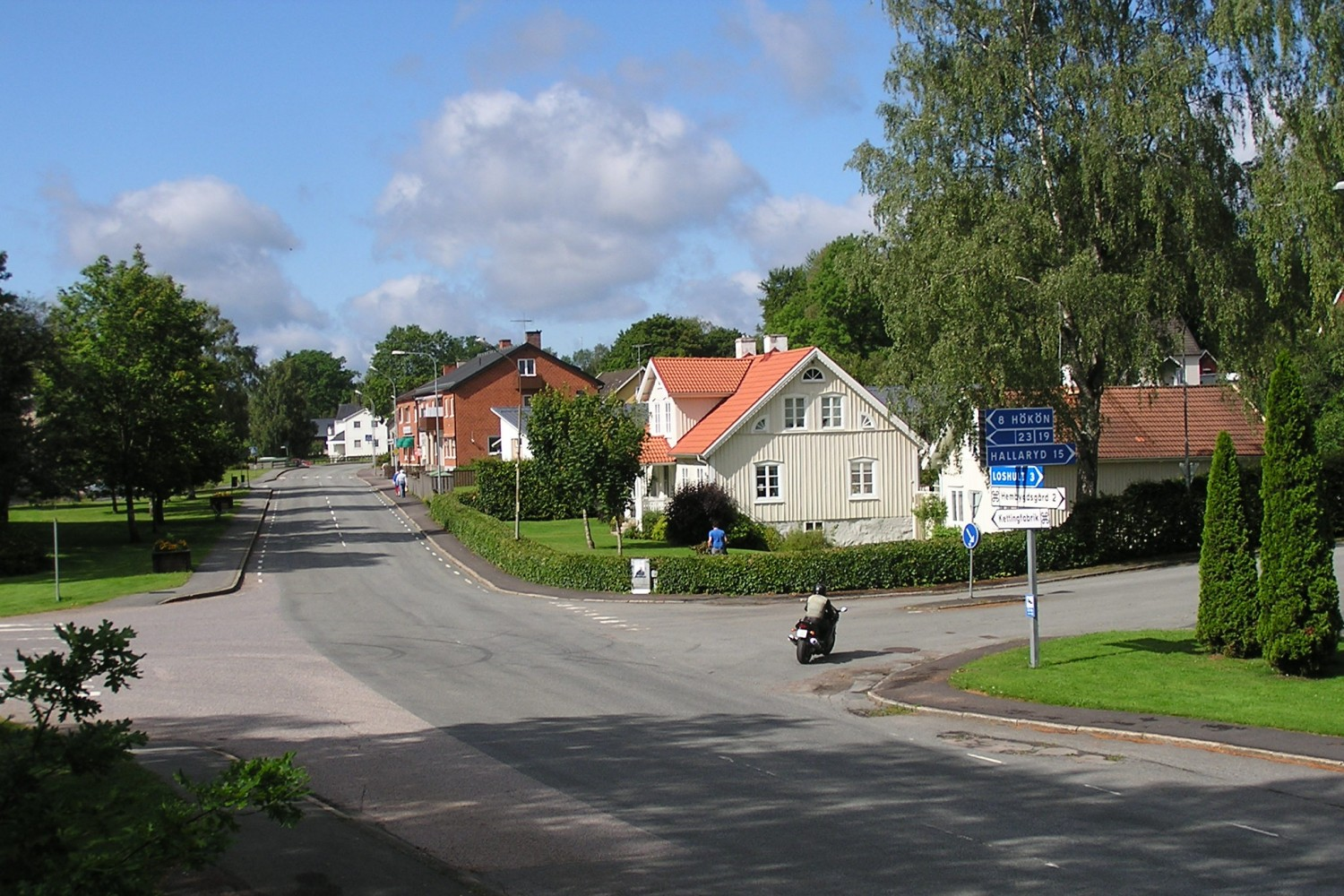
Killeberg in July 2017

Killeberg ([ɕɪlɛˈbærj]) is a locality situated in Osby Municipality, Skåne County, Sweden with 585 inhabitants in 2010.
