= Paleobiota of the Kristianstad Basin =

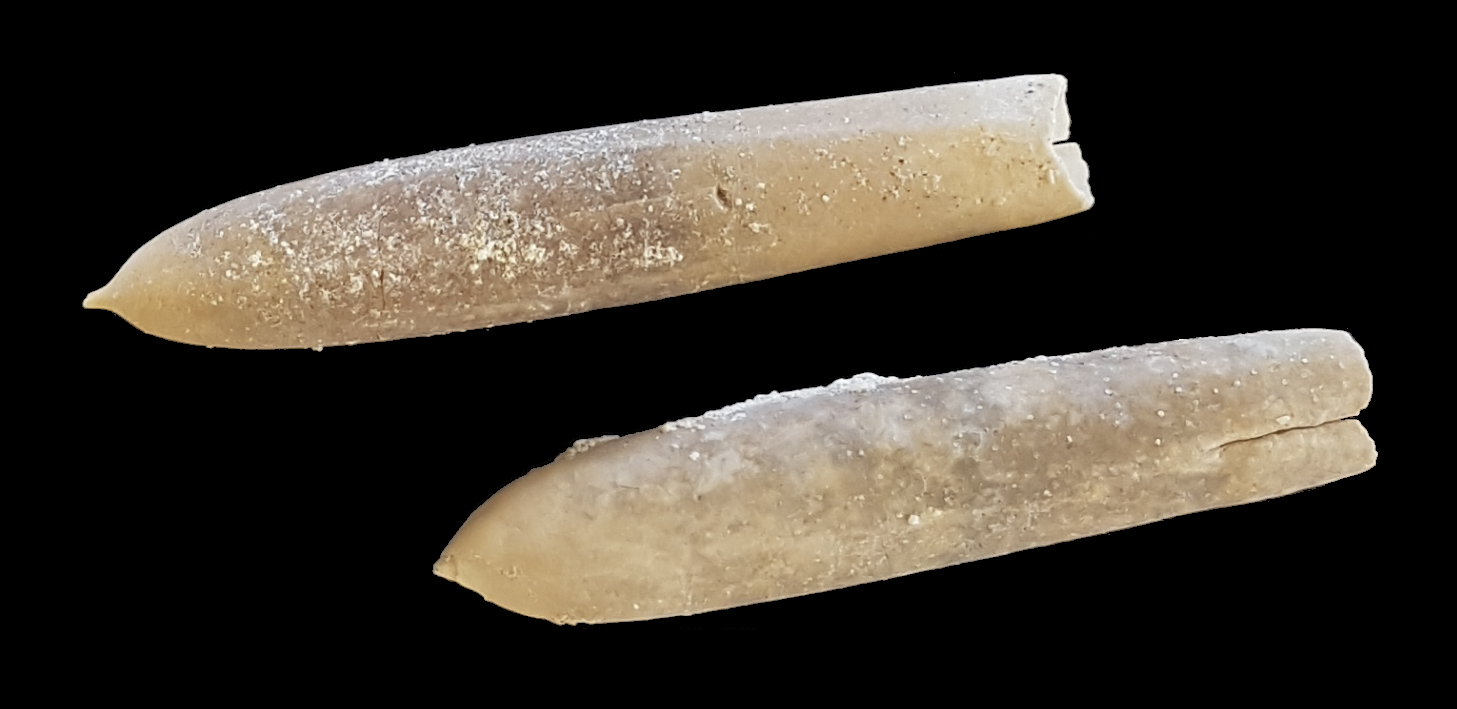
Belemnites, such as Belemnellocamax mammillatus (pictured), are common fossil finds in the Kristianstad Basin

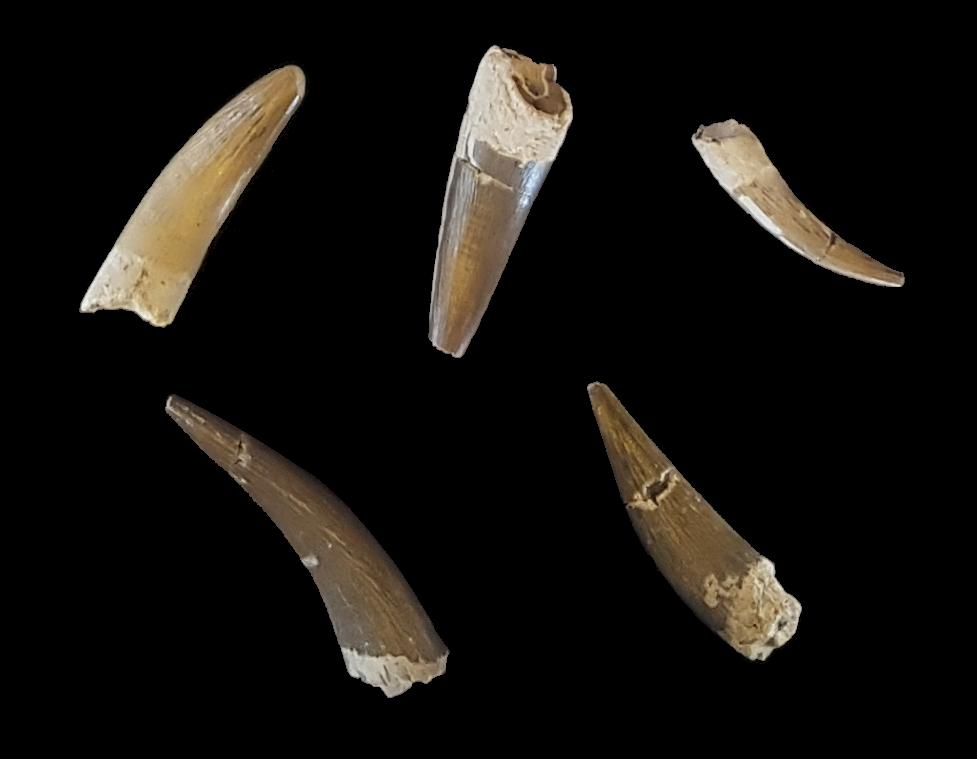
Teeth of the medium-sized plesiosaur Scanisaurus sp.

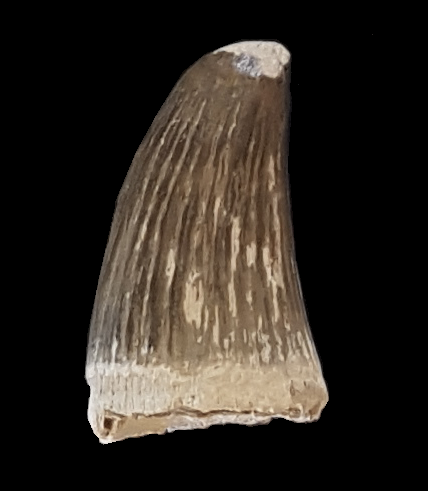
Tooth of the Kristianstad Basin's top predator, the giant mosasaur Tylosaurus ivoensis

The Kristianstad Basin is a Cretaceous-age structural basin and geological formation in northeastern Skåne, the southernmost province of Sweden. The sediments in the basin preserves a wide assortment of taxa represented in its fossil record, including the only non-avian dinosaur fossils in Sweden and one of the world's most diverse mosasaur faunas.

Though a majority of the taxa listed below lived during the latest early Campanian (c. 80.5 million years ago; fossils from the site Ivö Klack alone from this time compromise about 40 vertebrate species and more than 200 invertebrate species), the Kristianstad Basin preserves fossils ranging in age from the early Santonian (c. 86.3 million years ago) to the early Maastrichtian (c. 72.1 million years ago); some of the animals in the list were not contemporaries, but separated from each other in time by several million years. The time spans from which fossils have been recovered is included for each species in the list.

== Bony fish ==
=== Ray-finned fish ===
Ray-finned fishes reported from the Kristianstad Basin
| Genus | Species | Sites | Age | Material | Notes | Ref | Images |
|---|---|---|---|---|---|---|---|
| Anomoeodus | A. subclavatus | Ivö Klack, Ignaberga, Åsen | Latest Early Campanian – early Late Campanian | Dentitions and isolated teeth | A pycnodontid fish | | Enchodus An ichthyodectid fish (Gillicus) Pachyrhizodus Protosphyraena |
| Anomoeodus | A. sp. | Balsvik, Ullstorp | Latest Early Campanian – early Late Campanian | Two isolated teeth | A pycnodontid fish | | Enchodus An ichthyodectid fish (Gillicus) Pachyrhizodus Protosphyraena |
| Enchodus | E. cf. gladiolus | Site not reported | Uncertain | A single isolated palatine tooth | An aulopiform fish | | Enchodus An ichthyodectid fish (Gillicus) Pachyrhizodus Protosphyraena |
| Enchodus | E. sp. | Åsen | Latest Early Campanian | Dental remnants | An aulopiform fish, Enchodus-like dental remnants are abundant at Åsen and show considerable morphological variety. | | Enchodus An ichthyodectid fish (Gillicus) Pachyrhizodus Protosphyraena |
| Enchodus | cf. E. sp. | Balsvik | Uncertain | A single isolated palatine tooth | An aulopiform fish, morphology of this tooth is distinct from the tooth attributed to E. gladiolus. | | Enchodus An ichthyodectid fish (Gillicus) Pachyrhizodus Protosphyraena |
| Ichthyodectidae indet. | – | Åsen | Latest Early Campanian – early Late Campanian | Two isolated teeth and a single isolated scale | An ichthyodectid fish, similar to Gillicus. | | Enchodus An ichthyodectid fish (Gillicus) Pachyrhizodus Protosphyraena |
| Lepisosteidae indet. | – | Åsen | Latest Early Campanian | A single isolated scale | A gar | | Enchodus An ichthyodectid fish (Gillicus) Pachyrhizodus Protosphyraena |
| Pachyrhizodus | cf. P. sp. | Åsen | Latest Early Campanian – early Late Campanian | Four isolated teeth | An elopiform fish | | Enchodus An ichthyodectid fish (Gillicus) Pachyrhizodus Protosphyraena |
| Protosphyraena | P. sp. | Ivö Klack, Åsen, Ullstorp | Earliest Campanian – latest Early Campanian | Six isolated teeth | A pachycormid fish. The teeth of Protosphyraena are much larger than those of the other fish in the basin and were once mistakenly referred to theropod dinosaurs. | | Enchodus An ichthyodectid fish (Gillicus) Pachyrhizodus Protosphyraena |
| Pycnodontidae indet. | – | Åsen, Ullstorp | Latest Early Campanian | Two isolated teeth | A pycnodontid fish | | Enchodus An ichthyodectid fish (Gillicus) Pachyrhizodus Protosphyraena |
| Teleostei indet. | – | Åsen | Latest Early Campanian | Two isolated teeth | A teleost fish, teeth similar to those attributed to Pachyrhizodus, but lack key diagnostic features. | | Enchodus An ichthyodectid fish (Gillicus) Pachyrhizodus Protosphyraena |

== Cartilaginous fish ==
=== Sharks ===
Sharks reported from the Kristianstad Basin
| Genus | Species | Sites | Age | Material | Notes | Ref | Images |
|---|---|---|---|---|---|---|---|
| Acanthoscyllium | A. sp. | Balsvik, Bjärlången, Ballingslöv | Late Campanian | Isolated teeth | A hemiscylliid shark | | Carcharias Centroscymnus Chiloscyllium Cretoxyrhina Galeorhinus Hemiscyllium Heterodontus Hybodus Ptychodus Scapanorhynchus Squalicorax Squalus Squatina Scyliorhinus |
| Anomotodon | A. hermani | Ivö Klack, Ugnsmunnarna, Ignaberga, Åsen, Balsvik | Latest Early Campanian – early Late Campanian | Isolated teeth | A mitsukurinid shark | | Carcharias Centroscymnus Chiloscyllium Cretoxyrhina Galeorhinus Hemiscyllium Heterodontus Hybodus Ptychodus Scapanorhynchus Squalicorax Squalus Squatina Scyliorhinus |
| Archaeolamna | A. kopingensis | Ivö Klack, Ugnsmunnarna, Ignaberga, Åsen, Ballingslöv, Balsvik | Latest Early Campanian – earliest Maastrichtian | Isolated teeth | A lamniform shark | | Carcharias Centroscymnus Chiloscyllium Cretoxyrhina Galeorhinus Hemiscyllium Heterodontus Hybodus Ptychodus Scapanorhynchus Squalicorax Squalus Squatina Scyliorhinus |
| Carcharias | C. aasenensis | Ugnsmunnarna, Ignaberga, Åsen | Latest Early Campanian | Isolated teeth | An odontaspidid lamniform shark, same genus as the modern sand tiger shark | | Carcharias Centroscymnus Chiloscyllium Cretoxyrhina Galeorhinus Hemiscyllium Heterodontus Hybodus Ptychodus Scapanorhynchus Squalicorax Squalus Squatina Scyliorhinus |
| Carcharias | C. latus | Ivö Klack, Ugnsmunnarna, Ignaberga, Maltesholm, Åsen | Latest Early Campanian | Isolated teeth | An odontaspidid lamniform shark, same genus as the modern sand tiger shark | | Carcharias Centroscymnus Chiloscyllium Cretoxyrhina Galeorhinus Hemiscyllium Heterodontus Hybodus Ptychodus Scapanorhynchus Squalicorax Squalus Squatina Scyliorhinus |
| Carcharias | C. tenuis | Ivö Klack, Ugnsmunnarna, Ignaberga, Åsen | Latest Early Campanian | Isolated teeth | An odontaspidid lamniform shark, same genus as the modern sand tiger shark | | Carcharias Centroscymnus Chiloscyllium Cretoxyrhina Galeorhinus Hemiscyllium Heterodontus Hybodus Ptychodus Scapanorhynchus Squalicorax Squalus Squatina Scyliorhinus |
| Carcharias | C. sp. | Balsvik, Bjärlången, Ballingslöv | Late Campanian | Isolated teeth | An odontaspidid lamniform shark, same genus as the modern sand tiger shark | | Carcharias Centroscymnus Chiloscyllium Cretoxyrhina Galeorhinus Hemiscyllium Heterodontus Hybodus Ptychodus Scapanorhynchus Squalicorax Squalus Squatina Scyliorhinus |
| Cederstroemia | C. nilsi | Åsen | Latest Early Campanian | Isolated teeth | A wobbegong shark | | Carcharias Centroscymnus Chiloscyllium Cretoxyrhina Galeorhinus Hemiscyllium Heterodontus Hybodus Ptychodus Scapanorhynchus Squalicorax Squalus Squatina Scyliorhinus |
| Cederstroemia | C. sp. | Ullstorp | Earliest Campanian | Isolated teeth | A wobbegong shark | | Carcharias Centroscymnus Chiloscyllium Cretoxyrhina Galeorhinus Hemiscyllium Heterodontus Hybodus Ptychodus Scapanorhynchus Squalicorax Squalus Squatina Scyliorhinus |
| Centroscymnus | C. schmidi | Balsvik | Late Campanian/Earliest Maastrichtian | A single tooth from the lower jaw | Centroscymnus in the Kristianstad Basin are from a younger (Maastrichtian) layer than the other sharks. The genus survives to the present day. | | Carcharias Centroscymnus Chiloscyllium Cretoxyrhina Galeorhinus Hemiscyllium Heterodontus Hybodus Ptychodus Scapanorhynchus Squalicorax Squalus Squatina Scyliorhinus |
| Chiloscyllium | C. gaemersi | Ugnsmunnarna, Balsvik, Ballingslöv | Latest Early Campanian – Late Campanian | Isolated teeth | A hemiscylliid shark, the genus survives to the present day | | Carcharias Centroscymnus Chiloscyllium Cretoxyrhina Galeorhinus Hemiscyllium Heterodontus Hybodus Ptychodus Scapanorhynchus Squalicorax Squalus Squatina Scyliorhinus |
| Chiloscyllium | C. sp. | Ivö Klack, Ugnsmunnarna, Ignaberga, Maltesholm, Åsen | Latest Early Campanian | Isolated teeth | A hemiscylliid shark, the genus survives to the present day | | Carcharias Centroscymnus Chiloscyllium Cretoxyrhina Galeorhinus Hemiscyllium Heterodontus Hybodus Ptychodus Scapanorhynchus Squalicorax Squalus Squatina Scyliorhinus |
| Cretalamna | C. appendiculata | Ivö Klack, Ugnsmunnarna, Ignaberga, Maltesholm, Åsen | Latest Early Campanian | Isolated teeth | An otodontid lamniform shark | | Carcharias Centroscymnus Chiloscyllium Cretoxyrhina Galeorhinus Hemiscyllium Heterodontus Hybodus Ptychodus Scapanorhynchus Squalicorax Squalus Squatina Scyliorhinus |
| Cretalamna | C. borealis | Ugnsmunnarna, Ignaberga, Ivö Klack, Åsen, Hanaskog | Latest Early Campanian – early Late Campanian | Isolated teeth | An otodontid lamniform shark | | Carcharias Centroscymnus Chiloscyllium Cretoxyrhina Galeorhinus Hemiscyllium Heterodontus Hybodus Ptychodus Scapanorhynchus Squalicorax Squalus Squatina Scyliorhinus |
| Cretalamna | C. sacroportheta | Ugnsmunnarna, Ignaberga, Ivö Klack, Åsen, Maltesholm | Latest Early Campanian | Isolated teeth | An otodontid lamniform shark | | Carcharias Centroscymnus Chiloscyllium Cretoxyrhina Galeorhinus Hemiscyllium Heterodontus Hybodus Ptychodus Scapanorhynchus Squalicorax Squalus Squatina Scyliorhinus |
| Cretodus | C. borodini | Ignaberga, Åsen | Latest Early Campanian | Isolated teeth | A cretoxyrhinid lamniform shark | | Carcharias Centroscymnus Chiloscyllium Cretoxyrhina Galeorhinus Hemiscyllium Heterodontus Hybodus Ptychodus Scapanorhynchus Squalicorax Squalus Squatina Scyliorhinus |
| Cretorectolobus | C. sp. | Ignaberga, Åsen | Latest Early Campanian | Isolated teeth | A carpet shark | | Carcharias Centroscymnus Chiloscyllium Cretoxyrhina Galeorhinus Hemiscyllium Heterodontus Hybodus Ptychodus Scapanorhynchus Squalicorax Squalus Squatina Scyliorhinus |
| Cretoxyrhina | C. mantelli | Ivö Klack, Ignaberga, Ullstorp, Balsvik | Earliest Campanian – early Late Campanian | Isolated teeth | A large cretoxyrhinid lamniform shark | | Carcharias Centroscymnus Chiloscyllium Cretoxyrhina Galeorhinus Hemiscyllium Heterodontus Hybodus Ptychodus Scapanorhynchus Squalicorax Squalus Squatina Scyliorhinus |
| Eoetmopterus | E. supracretaceus | Balsvik | Late Campanian | Isolated teeth | A squaliform shark | | Carcharias Centroscymnus Chiloscyllium Cretoxyrhina Galeorhinus Hemiscyllium Heterodontus Hybodus Ptychodus Scapanorhynchus Squalicorax Squalus Squatina Scyliorhinus |
| Galeorhinus | G. sp. | Ivö Klack, Ugnsmunnarna, Ignaberga | Latest Early Campanian | Isolated teeth | A triakid shark, same genus as the modern school shark | | Carcharias Centroscymnus Chiloscyllium Cretoxyrhina Galeorhinus Hemiscyllium Heterodontus Hybodus Ptychodus Scapanorhynchus Squalicorax Squalus Squatina Scyliorhinus |
| Hemiscylliidae sp. | – | Ignaberga | Latest Early Campanian | Isolated teeth | A hemiscylliid shark | | Carcharias Centroscymnus Chiloscyllium Cretoxyrhina Galeorhinus Hemiscyllium Heterodontus Hybodus Ptychodus Scapanorhynchus Squalicorax Squalus Squatina Scyliorhinus |
| Hemiscyllium | H. hermani | Ugnsmunnarna, Ignaberga, Åsen, Balsvik, Ballingslöv | Latest Early Campanian – Late Campanian | Isolated teeth | A hemiscylliid shark, the genus survives to the present day | | Carcharias Centroscymnus Chiloscyllium Cretoxyrhina Galeorhinus Hemiscyllium Heterodontus Hybodus Ptychodus Scapanorhynchus Squalicorax Squalus Squatina Scyliorhinus |
| Heterodontus | H. aff. rugosus | Ignaberga, Maltesholm, Balsvik | Latest Early Campanian – early Late Campanian | Isolated teeth | A heterodontiform shark, same genus as the modern bullhead shark | | Carcharias Centroscymnus Chiloscyllium Cretoxyrhina Galeorhinus Hemiscyllium Heterodontus Hybodus Ptychodus Scapanorhynchus Squalicorax Squalus Squatina Scyliorhinus |
| Heterodontus | H. sp. 1 | Ivö Klack, Ugnsmunnarna, Ignaberga, Maltesholm, Åsen | Latest Early Campanian | Isolated teeth | A heterodontiform shark, same genus as the modern bullhead shark | | Carcharias Centroscymnus Chiloscyllium Cretoxyrhina Galeorhinus Hemiscyllium Heterodontus Hybodus Ptychodus Scapanorhynchus Squalicorax Squalus Squatina Scyliorhinus |
| Heterodontus | H. sp. 2 | Ivö Klack, Ignaberga, Åsen | Latest Early Campanian | Isolated teeth | A heterodontiform shark, same genus as the modern bullhead shark | | Carcharias Centroscymnus Chiloscyllium Cretoxyrhina Galeorhinus Hemiscyllium Heterodontus Hybodus Ptychodus Scapanorhynchus Squalicorax Squalus Squatina Scyliorhinus |
| Hybodus | H. sp. | Ivö Klack, Ignaberga, Åsen | Latest Early Campanian | A fragmentary fin spine and isolated teeth | A hybodontiform shark | | Carcharias Centroscymnus Chiloscyllium Cretoxyrhina Galeorhinus Hemiscyllium Heterodontus Hybodus Ptychodus Scapanorhynchus Squalicorax Squalus Squatina Scyliorhinus |
| Meristodon | M. sp. | Ullstorp | Earliest Campanian | Isolated teeth | A hybodontiform shark | | Carcharias Centroscymnus Chiloscyllium Cretoxyrhina Galeorhinus Hemiscyllium Heterodontus Hybodus Ptychodus Scapanorhynchus Squalicorax Squalus Squatina Scyliorhinus |
| Palaeogaleus | P. sp. | Ugnsmunnarna, Åsen | Latest Early Campanian | Isolated teeth | A triakid shark | | Carcharias Centroscymnus Chiloscyllium Cretoxyrhina Galeorhinus Hemiscyllium Heterodontus Hybodus Ptychodus Scapanorhynchus Squalicorax Squalus Squatina Scyliorhinus |
| Paranomotodon | P. sp. | Ivö Klack, Ugnsmunnarna, Ignaberga, Åsen | Latest Early Campanian | Isolated teeth | A lamniform shark | | Carcharias Centroscymnus Chiloscyllium Cretoxyrhina Galeorhinus Hemiscyllium Heterodontus Hybodus Ptychodus Scapanorhynchus Squalicorax Squalus Squatina Scyliorhinus |
| Paraorthacodus | P. andersoni | Ivö Klack, Ignaberga, Åsen, Balsvik | Latest Early Campanian – early Late Campanian | Four isolated teeth | A palaeospinacid shark | | Carcharias Centroscymnus Chiloscyllium Cretoxyrhina Galeorhinus Hemiscyllium Heterodontus Hybodus Ptychodus Scapanorhynchus Squalicorax Squalus Squatina Scyliorhinus |
| Paraorthacodus | P. conicus | Ivö Klack, Ugnsmunnarna, Ignaberga, Åsen, Balsvik | Latest Early Campanian – early Late Campanian | Over a thousand isolated teeth | A palaeospinacid shark | | Carcharias Centroscymnus Chiloscyllium Cretoxyrhina Galeorhinus Hemiscyllium Heterodontus Hybodus Ptychodus Scapanorhynchus Squalicorax Squalus Squatina Scyliorhinus |
| Paraorthacodus | P. n. sp. | Balsvik | Early Late Campanian | Isolated teeth | A palaeospinacid shark | | Carcharias Centroscymnus Chiloscyllium Cretoxyrhina Galeorhinus Hemiscyllium Heterodontus Hybodus Ptychodus Scapanorhynchus Squalicorax Squalus Squatina Scyliorhinus |
| Pararhincodon | P. spp. | Ugnsmunnarna, Ignaberga, Maltesholm, Åsen, Balsvik, Bjärlången, Ballingslöv | Latest Early Campanian – Late Campanian | Isolated teeth | A parascylliid shark, probably several species | | Carcharias Centroscymnus Chiloscyllium Cretoxyrhina Galeorhinus Hemiscyllium Heterodontus Hybodus Ptychodus Scapanorhynchus Squalicorax Squalus Squatina Scyliorhinus |
| Parasquatina | P. sp. | Balsvik | Late Campanian | Isolated teeth | A synechodontiform shark | | Carcharias Centroscymnus Chiloscyllium Cretoxyrhina Galeorhinus Hemiscyllium Heterodontus Hybodus Ptychodus Scapanorhynchus Squalicorax Squalus Squatina Scyliorhinus |
| Paratriakis | P. sp. | Ivö Klack, Ugnsmunnarna, Ignaberga, Maltesholm, Åsen, Ballingslöv | Latest Early Campanian – Late Campanian | Isolated teeth | A triakid shark | | Carcharias Centroscymnus Chiloscyllium Cretoxyrhina Galeorhinus Hemiscyllium Heterodontus Hybodus Ptychodus Scapanorhynchus Squalicorax Squalus Squatina Scyliorhinus |
| Polyacrodus | P. siversoni | Åsen | Latest Early Campanian | Isolated teeth | A hybodontiform shark | | Carcharias Centroscymnus Chiloscyllium Cretoxyrhina Galeorhinus Hemiscyllium Heterodontus Hybodus Ptychodus Scapanorhynchus Squalicorax Squalus Squatina Scyliorhinus |
| Polyacrodus | P. sp. | Åsen, Ullstorp | Earliest Campanian – latest Early Campanian | Isolated teeth | A hybodontiform shark | | Carcharias Centroscymnus Chiloscyllium Cretoxyrhina Galeorhinus Hemiscyllium Heterodontus Hybodus Ptychodus Scapanorhynchus Squalicorax Squalus Squatina Scyliorhinus |
| Proetmopterus | P. hemmooriensis | Balsvik, Bjärlången, Ballingslöv | Late Campanian | Isolated teeth | A squaliform shark | | Carcharias Centroscymnus Chiloscyllium Cretoxyrhina Galeorhinus Hemiscyllium Heterodontus Hybodus Ptychodus Scapanorhynchus Squalicorax Squalus Squatina Scyliorhinus |
| Pseudocorax | P. laevis | Ignaberga, Åsen, Balsvik | Latest Early Campanian – early Late Campanian | Isolated teeth | An anacoracid lamniform shark | | Carcharias Centroscymnus Chiloscyllium Cretoxyrhina Galeorhinus Hemiscyllium Heterodontus Hybodus Ptychodus Scapanorhynchus Squalicorax Squalus Squatina Scyliorhinus |
| Pseudocorax | P. aff. affinis | Ballingslöv | Earliest Maastrichtian | A single isolated tooth | An anacoracid lamniform shark, in later (Maastrichtian) strata than the other sharks | | Carcharias Centroscymnus Chiloscyllium Cretoxyrhina Galeorhinus Hemiscyllium Heterodontus Hybodus Ptychodus Scapanorhynchus Squalicorax Squalus Squatina Scyliorhinus |
| Pseudoscapanorhynchus | P. sp. | Balsvik | Early Late Campanian | Isolated teeth | A mitsukurinid shark | | Carcharias Centroscymnus Chiloscyllium Cretoxyrhina Galeorhinus Hemiscyllium Heterodontus Hybodus Ptychodus Scapanorhynchus Squalicorax Squalus Squatina Scyliorhinus |
| Ptychodus | P. spp. | Ignaberga | Late Middle Santonian – earliest Campanian | Isolated teeth | A hybodontiform shark, found in earlier strata than most other sharks | | Carcharias Centroscymnus Chiloscyllium Cretoxyrhina Galeorhinus Hemiscyllium Heterodontus Hybodus Ptychodus Scapanorhynchus Squalicorax Squalus Squatina Scyliorhinus |
| Scapanorhynchus | S. perssoni | Ivö Klack, Ugnsmunnarna, Åsen | Latest Early Campanian | Isolated teeth | A mitsukurinid shark | | Carcharias Centroscymnus Chiloscyllium Cretoxyrhina Galeorhinus Hemiscyllium Heterodontus Hybodus Ptychodus Scapanorhynchus Squalicorax Squalus Squatina Scyliorhinus |
| Scyliorhinidae sp. 1 | – | Åsen | Latest Early Campanian | Isolated teeth | A catshark | | Carcharias Centroscymnus Chiloscyllium Cretoxyrhina Galeorhinus Hemiscyllium Heterodontus Hybodus Ptychodus Scapanorhynchus Squalicorax Squalus Squatina Scyliorhinus |
| Scyliorhinidae sp. 2 | – | Ivö Klack | Latest Early Campanian | Isolated teeth | A catshark | | Carcharias Centroscymnus Chiloscyllium Cretoxyrhina Galeorhinus Hemiscyllium Heterodontus Hybodus Ptychodus Scapanorhynchus Squalicorax Squalus Squatina Scyliorhinus |
| Scyliorhinus | S. germanicus | Ivö Klack, Ugnsmunnarna, Ignaberga, Maltesholm, Åsen | Latest Early Campanian | Isolated teeth | A catshark, the genus survives to the present day | | Carcharias Centroscymnus Chiloscyllium Cretoxyrhina Galeorhinus Hemiscyllium Heterodontus Hybodus Ptychodus Scapanorhynchus Squalicorax Squalus Squatina Scyliorhinus |
| Scyliorhinus | S. moosi | Balsvik, Bjärslången, Ballingslöv | Late Campanian | Isolated teeth | A catshark, the genus survives to the present day | | Carcharias Centroscymnus Chiloscyllium Cretoxyrhina Galeorhinus Hemiscyllium Heterodontus Hybodus Ptychodus Scapanorhynchus Squalicorax Squalus Squatina Scyliorhinus |
| Serratolamna | S. sp. | Åsen | Latest Early Campanian | Isolated teeth | A cretoxyrhinid lamniform shark | | Carcharias Centroscymnus Chiloscyllium Cretoxyrhina Galeorhinus Hemiscyllium Heterodontus Hybodus Ptychodus Scapanorhynchus Squalicorax Squalus Squatina Scyliorhinus |
| Squalicorax | S. lindstromi | Ugnsmunnarna, Ignaberga, Ivö Klack, Åsen, Maltesholm, Hanaskog | Latest Early Campanian – early Late Campanian | Isolated teeth | An anacoracid lamniform shark; teeth formerly assigned to S. kaupi | | Carcharias Centroscymnus Chiloscyllium Cretoxyrhina Galeorhinus Hemiscyllium Heterodontus Hybodus Ptychodus Scapanorhynchus Squalicorax Squalus Squatina Scyliorhinus |
| Squalidae spp. | – | Ivö Klack, Ugnsmunnarna, Ignaberga, Maltesholm, Åsen | Latest Early Campanian | Isolated teeth | A squalid shark, probably several species | | Carcharias Centroscymnus Chiloscyllium Cretoxyrhina Galeorhinus Hemiscyllium Heterodontus Hybodus Ptychodus Scapanorhynchus Squalicorax Squalus Squatina Scyliorhinus |
| Squalus | S. ballingsloevensis | Ballingslöv, Bjärlången | Late Campanian – earliest Maastrichtian | More than a hundred isolated teeth | Squalus in the Kristianstad Basin are from a younger (Maastrichtian) layer than the other sharks. Same genus as modern spurdogs. The Ballingslöv site is not part of the Kristianstad Basin proper, representing a northwestern isolated outcrop. | | Carcharias Centroscymnus Chiloscyllium Cretoxyrhina Galeorhinus Hemiscyllium Heterodontus Hybodus Ptychodus Scapanorhynchus Squalicorax Squalus Squatina Scyliorhinus |
| Squalus | S. balsvikensis | Balsvik, Bjärlången, Ballingslöv | Late Campanian – earliest Maastrichtian | Several hundred isolated teeth | Squalus in the Kristianstad Basin are from a younger (Maastrichtian) layer than the other sharks. Same genus as modern spurdogs. | | Carcharias Centroscymnus Chiloscyllium Cretoxyrhina Galeorhinus Hemiscyllium Heterodontus Hybodus Ptychodus Scapanorhynchus Squalicorax Squalus Squatina Scyliorhinus |
| Squatina | S. fortemordeo | Åsen | Latest Early Campanian | Isolated teeth | An angelshark, the genus survives to the present day | | Carcharias Centroscymnus Chiloscyllium Cretoxyrhina Galeorhinus Hemiscyllium Heterodontus Hybodus Ptychodus Scapanorhynchus Squalicorax Squalus Squatina Scyliorhinus |
| Squatina | S. lundegreni | Åsen | Latest Early Campanian | Isolated teeth | An angelshark, the genus survives to the present day | | Carcharias Centroscymnus Chiloscyllium Cretoxyrhina Galeorhinus Hemiscyllium Heterodontus Hybodus Ptychodus Scapanorhynchus Squalicorax Squalus Squatina Scyliorhinus |
| Squatina | S. sp. | Ullstorp, Maltesholm, Bjärlången, Ballingslöv | Earliest Campanian – Late Campanian | Isolated teeth | An angelshark, the genus survives to the present day | | Carcharias Centroscymnus Chiloscyllium Cretoxyrhina Galeorhinus Hemiscyllium Heterodontus Hybodus Ptychodus Scapanorhynchus Squalicorax Squalus Squatina Scyliorhinus |
| Squatirhina | S. sp. | Ivö Klack, Ugnsmunnarna, Ignaberga, Maltesholm, Åsen | Latest Early Campanian | Isolated teeth | A wobbegong shark | | Carcharias Centroscymnus Chiloscyllium Cretoxyrhina Galeorhinus Hemiscyllium Heterodontus Hybodus Ptychodus Scapanorhynchus Squalicorax Squalus Squatina Scyliorhinus |
| Synechodus | S. lerichei | Ugnsmunnarna, Ignaberga | Latest Early Campanian | Isolated teeth | A palaeospinacid shark | | Carcharias Centroscymnus Chiloscyllium Cretoxyrhina Galeorhinus Hemiscyllium Heterodontus Hybodus Ptychodus Scapanorhynchus Squalicorax Squalus Squatina Scyliorhinus |
| Synechodus | S. filipi | Ugnsmunnarna, Ignaberga, Åsen | Latest Early Campanian | Isolated teeth | A palaeospinacid shark | | Carcharias Centroscymnus Chiloscyllium Cretoxyrhina Galeorhinus Hemiscyllium Heterodontus Hybodus Ptychodus Scapanorhynchus Squalicorax Squalus Squatina Scyliorhinus |
| Synechodus | S. perssoni | Ugnsmunnarna, Ignaberga | Latest Early Campanian | Isolated teeth | A palaeospinacid shark | | Carcharias Centroscymnus Chiloscyllium Cretoxyrhina Galeorhinus Hemiscyllium Heterodontus Hybodus Ptychodus Scapanorhynchus Squalicorax Squalus Squatina Scyliorhinus |
| Synechodus | S. sp. 1 | Ivö Klack, Ugnsmunnarna, Ignaberga, Åsen, Balsvik | Latest Early Campanian – Late Campanian | Isolated teeth | A palaeospinacid shark | | Carcharias Centroscymnus Chiloscyllium Cretoxyrhina Galeorhinus Hemiscyllium Heterodontus Hybodus Ptychodus Scapanorhynchus Squalicorax Squalus Squatina Scyliorhinus |
| Synechodus | S. sp. 2 | Ivö Klack, Ugnsmunnarna, Ignaberga, Maltesholm, Åsen, Balsvik | Latest Early Campanian – Late Campanian | Isolated teeth | A palaeospinacid shark | | Carcharias Centroscymnus Chiloscyllium Cretoxyrhina Galeorhinus Hemiscyllium Heterodontus Hybodus Ptychodus Scapanorhynchus Squalicorax Squalus Squatina Scyliorhinus |

=== Holocephali ===
Holocephali reported from the Kristianstad Basin
| Genus | Species | Sites | Age | Material | Notes | Ref | Images |
|---|---|---|---|---|---|---|---|
| Amylodon | A. sp. | Åsen | Latest Early Campanian | Dental remnants | A chimaeriform fish | | A chimaeriform fish (Chimaera, a relative of the four genera discovered in the Kristianstad Basin) |
| Edaphodon | E. sp. | Åsen | Latest Early Campanian | Dental remnants | A chimaeriform fish | | A chimaeriform fish (Chimaera, a relative of the four genera discovered in the Kristianstad Basin) |
| Elasmodus | E. sp. | Åsen, Hanaskog | Latest Early Campanian – early Late Campanian | Dental remnants and a mandibular plate | A chimaeriform fish | | A chimaeriform fish (Chimaera, a relative of the four genera discovered in the Kristianstad Basin) |
| Ischyodus | I. bifurcatus | Åsen | Latest Early Campanian | Dental remnants | A chimaeriform fish | | A chimaeriform fish (Chimaera, a relative of the four genera discovered in the Kristianstad Basin) |

=== Rays ===
Rays reported from the Kristianstad Basin
| Genus | Species | Sites | Age | Material | Notes | Ref | Images |
|---|---|---|---|---|---|---|---|
| Raja | R. sp. | Balsvik, Bjärlången, Ballingslöv | Earliest Maastrichtian | Isolated teeth | A rajiform ray. Raja in the Kristianstad Basin are from younger (Maastrichtian) strata than the other rays. The genus survives to the present day. | | Raja Rhinobatos |
| Rhinobatidae sp. | – | Balsvik, Bjärlången, Ballingslöv | Earliest Maastrichtian | Isolated teeth | A rhinobatid ray, Maastrichtian Rhinobatid ray fossils outnumber those of Raja at Bjärlången and Ballingslöv but are less common at Balsvik. | | Raja Rhinobatos |
| Rhinobatoidea sp. 1 | – | Ignaberga | Latest Early Campanian | Isolated teeth | A rhinobatoid ray | | Raja Rhinobatos |
| Rhinobatoidea sp. 2 | – | Ugnsmunnarna, Åsen | Latest Early Campanian | Isolated teeth | A rhinobatoid ray | | Raja Rhinobatos |
| Rhinobatos | R. casieri | Åsen | Latest Early Campanian | Isolated teeth | A rhinobatid ray, the genus survives to the present day | | Raja Rhinobatos |
| Rhinobatos | R. sp. 1 | Åsen | Latest Early Campanian | Isolated teeth | A rhinobatid ray, the genus survives to the present day | | Raja Rhinobatos |
| Rhinobatos | R. sp. 2 | Åsen | Latest Early Campanian | Isolated teeth | A rhinobatid ray, the genus survives to the present day | | Raja Rhinobatos |
| Rhinobatos | R. sp. 3 | Ivö Klack, Ignaberga, Åsen | Latest Early Campanian | Isolated teeth | A rhinobatid ray, the genus survives to the present day | | Raja Rhinobatos |
| Sclerorhynchidae indet. | – | Ullstorp | Earliest Campanian | Isolated teeth | A sclerorhynchid ray, fossils as of yet unpublished | | Raja Rhinobatos |
| Walteraja | W. exigua | Balsvik | Late Campanian | Isolated teeth | A rajiform ray | | Raja Rhinobatos |

== Crocodylomorphs ==
In addition to the remains referred to Aigialosuchus, detached and unidentified crocodylomorph scutes have also been discovered in Campanian-age deposits at Ivö Klack.

Crocodylomorphs reported from the Kristianstad Basin
| Genus | Species | Sites | Age | Material | Notes | Ref | Images |
|---|---|---|---|---|---|---|---|
| Aigialosuchus | A. villandensis | Ivö Klack, Ullstorp | Earliest Campanian – latest Early Campanian | Anterior parts of the skull and partial mandible | A marine dyrosaurid crocodylomorph and the only crocodylomorph known from the Kristianstad Basin. Likely durophagous (eating hard-shelled organisms). Its skull was similar to that of modern gharials. | | Dyrosaurus, a relative of Aigialosuchus |

== Dinosaurs ==
=== Non-avian dinosaurs ===
Non-avian dinosaurs reported from the Kristianstad Basin
| Group | Sites | Age | Material | Notes | Ref | Images |
|---|---|---|---|---|---|---|
| Leptoceratopsidae indet. | Åsen, Ullstorp | Earliest Campanian – latest Early Campanian | Four maxillary teeth, a dentary tooth, two caudal vertebrae, one right manual phalanx | Morphology of the teeth recovered corresponds roughly to Leptoceratops. Given that the teeth lack some of the ridges present in the teeth of Leptoceratops, and because of geographical distance, the Åsen leptoceratopsid is likely a new taxon. | | A leptoceratopsid dinosaur (Leptoceratops) A theropod dinosaur (Australovenator) |
| Ornithopoda indet. 1 | Åsen | Latest Early Campanian | A left pedal phalanx | A small ornithopod dinosaur. The recovered phalanx resembles the same bone in Thescelosaurus assiniboiensis. | | A leptoceratopsid dinosaur (Leptoceratops) A theropod dinosaur (Australovenator) |
| Ornithopoda indet. 2 | Åsen | Latest Early Campanian | A left pedal phalanx | A small ornithopod dinosaur. The recovered phalanx resembles the same bone in Hypsilophodon foxii. | | A leptoceratopsid dinosaur (Leptoceratops) A theropod dinosaur (Australovenator) |
| Theropoda indet. | Ugnsmunnarna | Latest Early Campanian | An incomplete right tibia | Identified as the remains of a small theropod dinosaur after comparisons with the same bone in the Australian genus Australovenator. The bone structure confidently identifies the fossil as that of a non-avian theropod dinosaur. | | A leptoceratopsid dinosaur (Leptoceratops) A theropod dinosaur (Australovenator) |

=== Birds ===
In addition to the fossils described below, indeterminate hesperornithiform remains have also been recovered from Åsen.

Birds reported from the Kristianstad Basin
| Genus | Species | Sites | Age | Material | Notes | Ref | Images |
|---|---|---|---|---|---|---|---|
| Baptornis | B. sp. | Ivö Klack | Latest Early Campanian | A dorsal vertebra and a tarsometatarsus | A hesperornithiform bird, specimens previously referred to "Parascaniornis stensioi" | | Hesperornis |
| Hesperornis | H. rossicus | Ivö Klack | Latest Early Campanian | Two tarsometatarsi | A hesperornithiform bird | | Hesperornis |
| Hesperornis | H. sp. | Ivö Klack | Latest Early Campanian | A dorsal vertebra | A hesperornithiform bird, the vertebra recovered is less slender than the one in H. rossicus | | Hesperornis |

== Mosasaurs ==
Mosasaurs reported from the Kristianstad Basin
| Genus | Species | Sites | Age | Material | Notes | Ref | Images |
|---|---|---|---|---|---|---|---|
| Clidastes | C. propython | Ivö Klack, Ugnsmunnarna, Ignaberga, Åsen, Axeltorp | Latest Early Campanian – early Late Campanian | Isolated (probably shed) tooth crowns, vertebrae | Most of the Clidastes fossils in the Kristianstad Basin are probably from juveniles measuring about 2–3 meters in length, with a few adult individuals at probably around 6 meters. | | Clidastes Hainosaurus Mosasaurus Prognathodon Selmasaurus Tylosaurus |
| Eonatator | E. sternbergi | Ivö Klack, Ignaberga, Åsen | Latest Early Campanian – early Late Campanian | Isolated (probably shed) teeth, marginal tooth crowns, vertebrae, a premaxilla and a pterygoid | Eonatator teeth are relatively common in the Kristianstad Basin, indicating that there were a relatively large number of individuals present. | | Clidastes Hainosaurus Mosasaurus Prognathodon Selmasaurus Tylosaurus |
| Hainosaurus | H. sp. | Ivö Klack, Ugnsmunnarna, Maltesholm, Åsen | Latest Early Campanian | Isolated marginal teeth | A large tylosaurine mosasaur. Hainosaurus is frequently treated as synonymous with Tylosaurus. The Kristianstad Basin Hainosaurus was a smaller relative of H. bernardi. | | Clidastes Hainosaurus Mosasaurus Prognathodon Selmasaurus Tylosaurus |
| Mosasaurus | M. aff. lemonnieri | Åhus | Latest Campanian/earliest Maastrichtian | A single isolated tooth crown (probably shed) | Known from a single tooth, Mosasaurus in the Kristianstad Basin is from a younger (Late Campanian/Maastrichtian) layer than the other mosasaurs. Similar in body size (and likely ecological niche) to the earlier Tylosaurus ivoensis. | | Clidastes Hainosaurus Mosasaurus Prognathodon Selmasaurus Tylosaurus |
| Plioplatecarpus | P. cf. primaevus | Balsvik | Late Campanian/earliest Maastrichtian | A partial right quadrate | The overall morphology of the quadrate bone is consistent with Plioplatecarpus and in particular with P. primaevus, a species otherwise only found in North America. The quadrate is from a younger (Maastrichtian) layer than the other mosasaurs. | | Clidastes Hainosaurus Mosasaurus Prognathodon Selmasaurus Tylosaurus |
| Prognathodon | P. sp. | Ivö Klack, Åsen | Latest Early Campanian | Isolated teeth, fragments of a jawbone, vertebrae | A mosasaur at about 8 meters in length with relatively wide and deep jaws. Bite marks matching Prognathodon teeth have been found on plesiosaur bones in the Kristianstad Basin. Frequently treated and listed under the name "Dollosaurus" or "Prognathodon (Dollosaurus)"; Dollosaurus being a junior synonym of Prognathodon. | | Clidastes Hainosaurus Mosasaurus Prognathodon Selmasaurus Tylosaurus |
| Selmasaurus | S. sp. | Ivö Klack, Åsen, Ullstorp | Earliest Campanian – latest Early Campanian | Several detached tooth crowns, fragments of a jawbone | Previously referred to Platecarpus somenensis and then Platecarpus sp. | | Clidastes Hainosaurus Mosasaurus Prognathodon Selmasaurus Tylosaurus |
| Tylosaurus | T. ivoensis | Ivö Klack, Ugnsmunnarna, Ignaberga, Åsen, Axeltorp, Balsberg | Latest Early Campanian – early Late Campanian | Several marginal teeth, pterygoid teeth, partial jawbones and several vertebrae | Previously referred to Mosasaurus and Hainosaurus. The largest mosasaur in the basin and "undoubtedly" its top predator, the lower jaw of Tylosaurus ivoensis is estimated to have been over 1.5 meters in length. | | Clidastes Hainosaurus Mosasaurus Prognathodon Selmasaurus Tylosaurus |

== Plesiosaurs ==
The last comprehensive review of the plesiosaur fauna in the Kristianstad Basin was done by paleontologist Per-Ove Persson in the 1960s and his taxonomy is still used with caution, pending a much-needed new review.

Plesiosaurs reported from the Kristianstad Basin
| Genus | Species | Sites | Age | Material | Notes | Ref | Images |
|---|---|---|---|---|---|---|---|
| Elasmosaurus? | E. cf. gigas | Ignaberga | Latest Early Campanian | A single vertebral centrum from the thoracic-lumbar region | A large elasmosaurid plesiosaur, the centrum is very poorly preserved | | Elasmosaurus A polycotylid plesiosaur (Trinacromerum) |
| Elasmosaurus? | E. cf. helmersenii | Ivö Klack | Latest Early Campanian | A single vertebral centrum from the cervical region | A large elasmosaurid plesiosaur, the centrum is very well preserved | | Elasmosaurus A polycotylid plesiosaur (Trinacromerum) |
| Polycotylidae indet. | – | Ivö Klack | Latest Early Campanian | Four incomplete vertebrae | Poorly preserved fossils, might be the same taxon as the other polycotylid | | Elasmosaurus A polycotylid plesiosaur (Trinacromerum) |
| Polycotylidae? indet. | – | Ivö Klack | Latest Early Campanian | Twelve detached teeth | Poorly preserved fossils, might be the same taxon as the other polycotylid | | Elasmosaurus A polycotylid plesiosaur (Trinacromerum) |
| Scanisaurus | S. cf. nazarowi | Ivö Klack, Ignaberga, Maltesholm, Axeltorp, Kjuge | Latest Early Campanian | Vertebral centra, detached teeth, diaphysical ossifications of humeri and femora | The most common plesiosaur in the Kristianstad Basin. Scanisaurus is no longer considered a valid taxon, but the name continues to be used for practical purposes. S. nazarowi is the type species of Scanisaurus and was previously referred to Cimoliasaurus. | | Elasmosaurus A polycotylid plesiosaur (Trinacromerum) |
| Scanisaurus | S. sp. | Ignaberga, Åsen | Latest Early Campanian – early Late Campanian | A crushed skull, isolated teeth | Fossils of this species include the only plesiosaurian skull (albeit crushed) known from Sweden. The preserved teeth are similar to those referred to Scanisaurus cf. nazarowi. | | Elasmosaurus A polycotylid plesiosaur (Trinacromerum) |

== Pterosaurs ==
Possible pterosaur bone fragments have been recovered from earliest Campanian-age deposits at Ullstorp, though they remain unpublished.

== Scincomorpha ==
Fossils of terrestrial scincomorph lizards have been recovered in the Kristianstad Basin, but are as of yet unpublished.

== Turtles ==
In addition to the fossils described below, indeterminate turtle remains, including limb bones and carapace fragments, have also been recovered from Ivö Klack, Ugnsmunnarna, Ignaberga and Åsen.

Turtles reported from the Kristianstad Basin
| Genus | Species | Sites | Age | Material | Notes | Ref | Images |
|---|---|---|---|---|---|---|---|
| Osteopygis | O?. sp. | Maltesholm | Latest Early Campanian | An incomplete carapace | A macrobaenid turtle; Einarsson (2018) notes that the identification as Osteopygis is likely incorrect and that the material is more likely to belong to the genus Euclastes, though it has not formally been reclassified. | | A softshell turtle (Apalone) |
| Trionychidae indet. | – | Ivö Klack | Latest Early Campanian | Shell fragments | A softshell turtle | | A softshell turtle (Apalone) |

== Invertebrates ==
Note: Although the Kristianstad Basin is incredibly rich in invertebrate fossils and diversity, with hundreds of species, the creation of a full list is impossible due to a lack of published overviews and recent examinations. Which lists are incomplete is specified below and estimates in regards to how many species are actually present are included if possible.

=== Bivalves ===
The bivalves are the most species-rich group present in the Kristianstad Basin, with Surlyk & Sørenson (2010) stating that close to 70 distinct species were present at Ivö Klack alone.

Bivalves reported from the Kristianstad Basin
| Genus | Species | Sites | Age | Material | Notes | Ref | Images |
|---|---|---|---|---|---|---|---|
| Acutostrea | A. incurva | Åsen, Axeltorp | Latest Early Campanian | Several specimens | A true oyster | | Mimachlamys Nucula Pecten Spondylus |
| Arcostrea | A. diluviana | Ivö Klack | Latest Early Campanian | Several specimens | A true oyster | | Mimachlamys Nucula Pecten Spondylus |
| Barbartia | B. sp. | Ullstorp | Latest Early Campanian | Several specimens | A arcid, the genus survives to the present day | | Mimachlamys Nucula Pecten Spondylus |
| Chlamys | C. sp. | Ullstorp | Latest Early Campanian | Several specimens | A pectinid, the genus survives to the present day | | Mimachlamys Nucula Pecten Spondylus |
| Hyotissa | H. sp. | Ivö Klack | | Several specimens | An ostreid, the genus survives to the present day | | Mimachlamys Nucula Pecten Spondylus |
| Inoceramus | I. sp. | Ullstorp | Latest Early Campanian | Several specimens | A pteriid | | Mimachlamys Nucula Pecten Spondylus |
| Lima | L. semisulcata | Balsvik | Early Late Campanian | Several specimens | A limid, the genus survives to the present day | | Mimachlamys Nucula Pecten Spondylus |
| Mimachlamys | M. sp. | Ullstorp | Latest Early Campanian | Several specimens | A pectinid, the genus survives to the present day | | Mimachlamys Nucula Pecten Spondylus |
| Nemocardium | N. sp. | Ullstorp | Latest Early Campanian | Several specimens | A carditid, the genus survives to the present day | | Mimachlamys Nucula Pecten Spondylus |
| Nucula | N. sp. | Ullstorp | Latest Early Campanian | Several specimens | A nuculid, the genus survives to the present day | | Mimachlamys Nucula Pecten Spondylus |
| Ostrea | O. haliotoidea | Ivö Klack, Hanaskog | Latest Early Campanian – Early Late Campanian | Several specimens | A true oyster | | Mimachlamys Nucula Pecten Spondylus |
| Ostrea | O. semiplana | Hanaskog | Early Late Campanian | Several specimens | A true oyster | | Mimachlamys Nucula Pecten Spondylus |
| Ostreidae indet. | – | Åsen | Latest Early Campanian | Several specimens | A true oyster | | Mimachlamys Nucula Pecten Spondylus |
| Pecten | P. subaraturs | Balsvik | Early Late Campanian | Several specimens | A pectinid, the genus survives to the present day | | Mimachlamys Nucula Pecten Spondylus |
| Pecten | P. undulatus | Hanaskog | Early Late Campanian | Several specimens | A pectinid, the genus survives to the present day | | Mimachlamys Nucula Pecten Spondylus |
| Pycnodonte | P. vesicularis | Hanaskog, Balsvik, Ballingslöv | Early Late Campanian – Latest Late Campanian | Several specimens | An ostreid | | Mimachlamys Nucula Pecten Spondylus |
| Rastellum | R. diluvianum | Ivö Klack | | Several specimens | A true oyster | | Mimachlamys Nucula Pecten Spondylus |
| Rudista indet. | – | Ullstorp | Latest Early Campanian | Several specimens | A rudist | | Mimachlamys Nucula Pecten Spondylus |
| Spondylus | S. labiatus | Ivö Klack | Latest Early Campanian | Several specimens | A spondylid, the genus survives to the present day | | Mimachlamys Nucula Pecten Spondylus |

=== Brachiopods ===
According to Surlyk & Sørenson (2010) there were 27 distinct species of brachiopods present at Ivö Klack alone.

Brachiopods reported from the Kristianstad Basin
| Genus | Species | Sites | Age | Material | Notes | Ref | Images |
|---|---|---|---|---|---|---|---|
| Ancistrocrania | A. stobei | Ivö Klack | Latest Early Campanian | Several specimens | A craniid | | Isocrania |
| Crania | C. craniolaris | Ivö Klack, Balsberg, Ugnsmunnarna | Latest Early Campanian | Several specimens | A craniid; one of the dominant brachiopod genera in the basin | | Isocrania |
| Cyranoia | C. longirostris | Ivö Klack | Latest Early Campanian | Several specimens | A terebratulidan | | Isocrania |
| Cyranoia | C. vissae | Ivö Klack | Latest Early Campanian | Several specimens | A terebratulidan | | Isocrania |
| Isocrania | I. egnabergensis | Ugnsmunnarna, Ignaberga | Latest Early Campanian | Several specimens | A craniid | | Isocrania |
| Magas | | Balsberg | | Several specimens | A terebratulidan; one of the dominant brachiopod genera in the basin | | Isocrania |
| Rhynchonella | R. spectabilis | Ullstorp | Latest Early Campanian | Several specimens | A rhynchonellid; one of the dominant brachiopod genera in the basin | | Isocrania |
| Terebratula | | Ivö Klack, Ignaberga | Latest Early Campanian | Several specimens | A terebratulidan; one of the dominant brachiopod genera in the basin | | Isocrania |

=== Bryozoans ===
Fossils of bryozoans are common in several sites throughout the Kristianstad Basin.

=== Cephalopods ===
==== Belemnites ====
Belemnites reported from the Kristianstad Basin
| Genus | Species | Sites | Age | Material | Notes | Ref | Images |
|---|---|---|---|---|---|---|---|
| Actinocamax | A. verus | Ringeleslätt, Ullstorp | Earliest Campanian | Belemnite cones | | | Life restoration of a group of belemnites Belemnellocamax Gonioteuthis |
| Belemnellocamax | B. balsvikensis | Åsen, Balsvik | Earliest Late Campanian | Belemnite cones | | | Life restoration of a group of belemnites Belemnellocamax Gonioteuthis |
| Belemnellocamax | B. grossouvrei | Ullstorp | Earliest Campanian | Belemnite cones | | | Life restoration of a group of belemnites Belemnellocamax Gonioteuthis |
| Belemnellocamax | B. mammillatus | Ullstorp, Ugnsmunnarna, Ignaberga, Ivö Klack, Åsen, Maltesholm | Latest Early Campanian | Belemnite cones | | | Life restoration of a group of belemnites Belemnellocamax Gonioteuthis |
| Belemnella | B. lanceolata | Balsvik, Bjärlången, Ballingslöv | Latest Campanian/earliest Maastrichtian | Belemnite cones | | | Life restoration of a group of belemnites Belemnellocamax Gonioteuthis |
| Belemnitella | B. alpha | Ringeleslätt, Ullstorp | Earliest Campanian | Belemnite cones | | | Life restoration of a group of belemnites Belemnellocamax Gonioteuthis |
| Belemnitella | B. minor | Balsvik, Bjärlången | Latest Campanian/earliest Maastrichtian | Belemnite cones | | | Life restoration of a group of belemnites Belemnellocamax Gonioteuthis |
| Belemnitella | B. mucronata | Ullstorp, Ugnsmunnarna, Ignaberga, Ivö Klack, Åsen, Maltesholm, Balsvik, Hanaskog, Bjärlången | Latest Early Campanian – Middle Late Campanian | Belemnite cones | | | Life restoration of a group of belemnites Belemnellocamax Gonioteuthis |
| Belemnitella | B. praecursor | Ullstorp | Earliest Campanian | Belemnite cones | Possibly misidentified specimens of B. alpha | | Life restoration of a group of belemnites Belemnellocamax Gonioteuthis |
| Belemnitella | B. sp. | Ballingslöv | Latest Campanian/earliest Maastrichtian | Belemnite cones | | | Life restoration of a group of belemnites Belemnellocamax Gonioteuthis |
| Gonioteuthis | G. granulaquadrata | Ringeleslätt, Ignaberga, Ullstorp | Earliest Campanian | Belemnite cones | | | Life restoration of a group of belemnites Belemnellocamax Gonioteuthis |
| Gonioteuthis | G. granulata | Ringeleslätt | Late Santonian | Belemnite cones | | | Life restoration of a group of belemnites Belemnellocamax Gonioteuthis |
| Gonioteuthis | G. quadrata quadrata | Ullstorp | Earliest Campanian | Belemnite cones | | | Life restoration of a group of belemnites Belemnellocamax Gonioteuthis |
| Gonioteuthis | G. quadrata scaniensis | Ugnsmunnarna, Ignaberga, Ivö Klack, Åsen | Latest Early Campanian | Belemnite cones | | | Life restoration of a group of belemnites Belemnellocamax Gonioteuthis |
| Gonioteuthis | G. westfalica westfalica | Ringeleslätt | Early/Middle Santonian | Belemnite cones | | | Life restoration of a group of belemnites Belemnellocamax Gonioteuthis |
| Gonioteuthis | G. westfalicagranulata | Ringeleslätt, Ignaberga | Late Middle Santonian | Belemnite cones | | | Life restoration of a group of belemnites Belemnellocamax Gonioteuthis |

==== Ammonites ====
According to Surlyk & Sørenson, a large species of ammonite is also known from Ivö Klack.

Ammonites reported from the Kristianstad Basin
| Genus | Species | Sites | Age | Material | Notes | Ref | Images |
|---|---|---|---|---|---|---|---|
| Ammonites | A. stobei | Ignaberga | Latest Early Campanian | Shell fossils | | | Baculites |
| Baculites | B. sp. | Ullstorp | Earliest Campanian | Shell fossils | A turrilitoid | | Baculites |
| Hauericeras | H. cf. pseudogardeni | Ignaberga | Latest Early Campanian | Shell fossils | A desmoceratoid | | Baculites |

=== Chitons ===
Chitons reported from the Kristianstad Basin
| Genus | Species | Sites | Age | Material | Notes | Ref | Images |
|---|---|---|---|---|---|---|---|
| Olingechiton | O. triangulatus | Barnakälla | Campanian | | A paleoloricatan | | |
| Scanochiton | S. jugatus | Barnakälla | Campanian | | A paleoloricatan | | |

=== Corals ===
Fossils of corals are common in several sites throughout the Kristianstad Basin. The list below only accounts for the recently revised diversity of corals found at Ivö Klack.

Corals reported from the Kristianstad Basin
| Genus | Species | Sites | Age | Material | Notes | Ref | Images |
|---|---|---|---|---|---|---|---|
| Acrosmilia | A. baltica | Ivö Klack | Latest Early Campanian | Several specimens | A acrosmiliid | | Diploria Echinophyllia |
| Clausastrea | C. informal sp. A | Ivö Klack | Latest Early Campanian | Several specimens | A montlivaltiid | | Diploria Echinophyllia |
| Clausastrea | C. informal sp. B | Ivö Klack | Latest Early Campanian | Several specimens | A montlivaltiid | | Diploria Echinophyllia |
| Dimorphastrea | D. sp. | Ivö Klack | Latest Early Campanian | Several specimens | A latomeandrid | | Diploria Echinophyllia |
| Dimorphastrea | D?. sp. | Ivö Klack | Latest Early Campanian | Several specimens | A latomeandrid | | Diploria Echinophyllia |
| Diploria | D. sp. | Ivö Klack | Latest Early Campanian | Several specimens | A mussid, the genus survives to the present day | | Diploria Echinophyllia |
| Echinophyllia | E. sp. | Ivö Klack | Latest Early Campanian | Several specimens | A lobophylliid, the genus survives to the present day | | Diploria Echinophyllia |
| Micrabacia | M. hilgardi | Åsen | Latest Early Campanian | Several specimens | A micrabaciid | | Diploria Echinophyllia |
| Micrabacia | M. suecica | Ivö Klack | Latest Early Campanian | Several specimens | A micrabaciid | | Diploria Echinophyllia |
| Paracyathus | P. sp. | Ivö Klack | Latest Early Campanian | Several specimens | A caryophylliid, the genus survives to the present day | | Diploria Echinophyllia |
| Parasmilia | P. centralis | Ivö Klack | Latest Early Campanian | Several specimens | A caryophylliid, the genus survives to the present day | | Diploria Echinophyllia |
| Scleractinia informal indet. A | – | Ivö Klack | Latest Early Campanian | Several specimens | | | Diploria Echinophyllia |
| Scleractinia informal indet. B | – | Ivö Klack | Latest Early Campanian | Several specimens | | | Diploria Echinophyllia |

=== Crinoids ===
Fossils of crinoids have been found at several sites throughout the Kristianstad Basin.

=== Crustaceans ===
Crustaceans reported from the Kristianstad Basin
| Genus | Species | Sites | Age | Material | Notes | Ref | Images |
|---|---|---|---|---|---|---|---|
| Arcoscalpellum | A. sp. | Åsen | Latest Early Campanian | Several specimens | A goose barnacle | | Callianassa |
| Callianassa | C. sp. | Åsen | Latest Early Campanian | Chelipeds (legs bearing claws) | A decapod crustacean, the genus survives to the present day | | Callianassa |
| Protocallianassa | P. faujasi | Åsen, Ivö Klack | Latest Early Campanian – earliest Late Campanian | Several chelipeds (legs bearing claws) | A decapod crustacean, sometimes referred to as the "burrowing ghost shrimp" | | Callianassa |
| Pycnolepas | P. ignabergensis | Ignaberga | Latest Early Campanian | | A brachylepadomorph barnacle | | Callianassa |

=== Echinoids ===
According to Surlyk & Sørenson (2010) there were 18 distinct species of echinoids present at Ivö Klack alone.

Echinoids reported from the Kristianstad Basin
| Genus | Species | Sites | Age | Material | Notes | Ref | Images |
|---|---|---|---|---|---|---|---|
| Cidaris | C. sp. | Ullstorp, Ignaberga | Latest Early Campanian | Several specimens | A cidaroid, the genus survives to the present day; one of the dominant echinoid genera in the basin | | Cidaris Conulus Echinocorys Hemipneustes Micraster |
| Conulus | C. sp. | Balsvik | Late Campanian | Several specimens | A echinoneoid | | Cidaris Conulus Echinocorys Hemipneustes Micraster |
| Diplodetus | D. idae | Bäckaskog | Latest Early Campanian – earliest Late Campanian | Several specimens | A spatangoid; many fossils mislabelled as various species of the related genus Micraster | | Cidaris Conulus Echinocorys Hemipneustes Micraster |
| Echinocorys | E. sp. | Throughout the basin | Campanian | Several specimens | A holasteroid; one of the dominant echinoid genera in the basin | | Cidaris Conulus Echinocorys Hemipneustes Micraster |
| Echinogalerus | E. peltiformis | Ivö Klack | Latest Early Campanian – earliest Late Campanian | Several specimens | A cassiduloid; sometimes referred to by the invalid name Caratomus; one of the dominant echinoid genera in the basin | | Cidaris Conulus Echinocorys Hemipneustes Micraster |
| Hemipneustes | H. sp. | Ignaberga | Latest Early Campanian | Several specimens | A holasteroid | | Cidaris Conulus Echinocorys Hemipneustes Micraster |
| Holaster | H. sp. | Åsen | Early Campanian | Several specimens | A holasteroid; one of the dominant echinoid genera in the basin | | Cidaris Conulus Echinocorys Hemipneustes Micraster |
| Micraster | M. sp. | Balsvik | Late Campanian | Several specimens | A spatangoid; one of the dominant echinoid genera in the basin | | Cidaris Conulus Echinocorys Hemipneustes Micraster |
| Pedinopsis | P. sp. | Ivö Klack | Early Campanian | Several specimens | An indeterminate echinacean | | Cidaris Conulus Echinocorys Hemipneustes Micraster |
| Phymosoma | P. sp. | Ivö Klack | Early Campanian | Several specimens | A phymosomatoid; one of the dominant echinoid genera in the basin | | Cidaris Conulus Echinocorys Hemipneustes Micraster |
| Phymosomatoida indet. | – | Ignaberga | Early Campanian | Shells | A phymosomatoid | | Cidaris Conulus Echinocorys Hemipneustes Micraster |
| Phymotaxis | P. sp. | Ivö Klack | Early Campanian | Several specimens | A stomopneustoid | | Cidaris Conulus Echinocorys Hemipneustes Micraster |
| Plagiochasma | P.? sp. | Ivö Klack, Ignaberga | Early Campanian | Several specimens | A irregularian | | Cidaris Conulus Echinocorys Hemipneustes Micraster |
| Polysalenia | P. notabilis | Ivö Klack | Latest Early Campanian | A few specimens | A salenioid | | Cidaris Conulus Echinocorys Hemipneustes Micraster |
| Polysalenia | P. cottaldi | Ivö Klack | Latest Early Campanian | A single specimen | A salenioid | | Cidaris Conulus Echinocorys Hemipneustes Micraster |
| Salenia | S. areolata | Ignaberga, Barnakälla, Balsberg, Ivö Klack | Latest Early Campanian | Several specimens | A salenioid; relatively common species, one of the dominant echinoid genera in the basin | | Cidaris Conulus Echinocorys Hemipneustes Micraster |
| Salenia | S. lundgreni | Mörby | Early Late Campanian | A few specimens | A salenioid; one of the dominant echinoid genera in the basin | | Cidaris Conulus Echinocorys Hemipneustes Micraster |
| Stereocidaris | S. hudspethensis | Ivö Klack | Early Campanian | Several specimens | A cidaroid, the genus survives to the present day | | Cidaris Conulus Echinocorys Hemipneustes Micraster |
| Stereocidaris | S. sp. | Ivö Klack | Early Campanian | Several specimens | A cidaroid, the genus survives to the present day | | Cidaris Conulus Echinocorys Hemipneustes Micraster |
| Trisalenia | T. loveni | Ivö Klack, Barnakälla, Ignaberga | Latest Early Campanian | Several specimens | A salenioid; a large number of specimens found at Ivö Klack, with few from Barnakälla and Ignaberga | | Cidaris Conulus Echinocorys Hemipneustes Micraster |
| Trochalosoma | T.? corneti | Ivö Klack | Early Campanian | Several specimens | A phymosomatoid | | Cidaris Conulus Echinocorys Hemipneustes Micraster |
| Tylocidaris | T. gosae | Ivö Klack | Early Campanian | Several specimens | A cidaroid | | Cidaris Conulus Echinocorys Hemipneustes Micraster |
| Tylocidaris | T. squamifera | Ignaberga | Campanian | Several specimens | A cidaroid | | Cidaris Conulus Echinocorys Hemipneustes Micraster |

=== Gastropods ===
According to Surlyk & Sørenson (2010), 19 species of gastropods could be identified from fossils just from the latest Early Campanian of Ivö Klack. Their subsequent 2011 study on the gastropods of the site only listed the 15 species accounted for below.

Gastropods reported from the Kristianstad Basin
| Genus | Species | Sites | Age | Material | Notes | Ref | Images |
|---|---|---|---|---|---|---|---|
| Campanile | C. sp. | Ivö Klack, Åsen | Latest Early Campanian | Several specimens | A marine caenogastropod | | Patella |
| Campanilidae sp. A | – | Ivö Klack | Latest Early Campanian | Three specimens | A marine caenogastropod | | Patella |
| Campanilidae sp. B | – | Ivö Klack | Latest Early Campanian | Three specimens | A marine caenogastropod | | Patella |
| Gastropoda indet. 1 | – | Ivö Klack | Latest Early Campanian | Not specified | A hitherto unidentified marine gastropod | | Patella |
| Gastropoda indet. 2 | – | Ivö Klack | Latest Early Campanian | Not specified | A hitherto unidentified marine gastropod | | Patella |
| Gastropoda indet. 3 | – | Ivö Klack | Latest Early Campanian | Not specified | A hitherto unidentified marine gastropod | | Patella |
| Gyrodes | G. sp. | Ivö Klack | Latest Early Campanian | One specimen | A marine caenogastropod | | Patella |
| Naticidae sp. | – | Ivö Klack | Latest Early Campanian | One specimen | A marine caenogastropod | | Patella |
| Neomesogastropoda aff. Naticidae sp. | – | Ivö Klack | Latest Early Campanian | Eight specimens | A marine caenogastropod | | Patella |
| Otostoma | O. sp. A | Ivö Klack | Latest Early Campanian | One specimen | A marine neritimorph | | Patella |
| Otostoma | O. sp. B | Ivö Klack | Latest Early Campanian | One specimen | A marine neritimorph | | Patella |
| Otostoma | O. sp. C | Ivö Klack | Latest Early Campanian | One specimen | A marine neritimorph | | Patella |
| Patella | P. sp. | Ivö Klack | Latest Early Campanian | Two specimens | A marine patellogastropod, the genus survives to the present day | | Patella |
| Trochidae sp. aff. Chilodonta | – | Ivö Klack | Latest Early Campanian | One specimen | A marine archaeogastropod | | Patella |
| Trochidae sp. | – | Ivö Klack | Latest Early Campanian | One specimen | A marine archaeogastropod | | Patella |
| Volutodermidae sp. A | – | Ivö Klack | Latest Early Campanian | Two specimens | A marine caenogastropod | | Patella |
| Volutodermidae sp. B | – | Ivö Klack | Latest Early Campanian | One specimen | A marine caenogastropod | | Patella |

=== Polychaetes ===
In addition to the diverse polychaete worm fauna of Ivö Klack listed below, encrusters of serpulid polychaetes have also been discovered at Åsen, though they are considerably fewer in number there and as of yet unpublished.

Polychaetes reported from the Kristianstad Basin
| Genus | Species | Sites | Age | Material | Notes | Ref | Images |
|---|---|---|---|---|---|---|---|
| Cementula | C. sphaerica | Ivö Klack | Latest Early Campanian | Trace fossils; polychaete encrusters in rock | A serpulid; abundant and small species | | Glomerula |
| Filogranula | F. cincta | Ivö Klack | Latest Early Campanian | Trace fossils; polychaete encrusters in rock | A serpulid; rare and medium-sized species, the genus survives to the present day | | Glomerula |
| Glomerula | G. plexus | Ivö Klack | Latest Early Campanian | Trace fossils; polychaete encrusters in rock | A sabellid; rare and medium-sized species, the genus survives to the present day | | Glomerula |
| Glomerula | G. serpentina | Ivö Klack | Latest Early Campanian | Trace fossils; polychaete encrusters in rock | A sabellid; abundant and small species, the genus survives to the present day | | Glomerula |
| Gynaeconitis | G. gynaeconitis | Ivö Klack | Latest Early Campanian | Trace fossils; polychaete encrusters in rock | A serpulid; common and large species | | Glomerula |
| Gynaeconitis | G.? sp. | Ivö Klack | Latest Early Campanian | Trace fossils; polychaete encrusters in rock | A serpulid; rare and large species | | Glomerula |
| Neovermilia | N. cf. ampullacea | Ivö Klack | Latest Early Campanian | Trace fossils; polychaete encrusters in rock | A serpulid; rare and medium-sized species, the genus survives to the present day | | Glomerula |
| Neovermilia | N.? sp. A | Ivö Klack | Latest Early Campanian | Trace fossils; polychaete encrusters in rock | A serpulid; rare and small species, the genus survives to the present day | | Glomerula |
| Neovermilia | N.? sp. B | Ivö Klack | Latest Early Campanian | Trace fossils; polychaete encrusters in rock | A serpulid; rare and large species, the genus survives to the present day | | Glomerula |
| Placostegus | P. aduncus | Ivö Klack | Latest Early Campanian | Trace fossils; polychaete encrusters in rock | A serpulid; rare and medium-sized species, the genus survives to the present day | | Glomerula |
| Pileolaria | P. sp. A | Ivö Klack | Latest Early Campanian | Trace fossils; polychaete encrusters in rock | A serpulid; abundant and small species, the genus survives to the present day | | Glomerula |
| Pileolaria | P. sp. B | Ivö Klack | Latest Early Campanian | Trace fossils; polychaete encrusters in rock | A serpulid; common and small species, the genus survives to the present day | | Glomerula |
| Protectoconorca | cf. P. senonensis | Ivö Klack | Latest Early Campanian | Trace fossils; polychaete encrusters in rock | A serpulid; rare and large species | | Glomerula |
| Pyrgopolon | P. (Septenaria) sp. aff. voigti | Ivö Klack | Latest Early Campanian | Trace fossils; polychaete encrusters in rock | A serpulid; common and medium-sized species, the genus survives to the present day | | Glomerula |
| Pyrgopolon | P. sp. | Ivö Klack | Latest Early Campanian | Trace fossils; polychaete encrusters in rock | A serpulid; rare and medium-sized species, the genus survives to the present day | | Glomerula |
| Pyrgopolon | P.? sp. | Ivö Klack | Latest Early Campanian | Trace fossils; polychaete encrusters in rock | A serpulid; rare and large species, the genus survives to the present day | | Glomerula |
| 'Unidentified' sp. A | – | Ivö Klack | Latest Early Campanian | Trace fossils; polychaete encrusters in rock | A serpulid; rare and medium-sized species | | Glomerula |
| 'Unidentified' sp. B | – | Ivö Klack | Latest Early Campanian | Trace fossils; polychaete encrusters in rock | A serpulid; rare and large species | | Glomerula |
| 'Unidentified' sp. C | – | Ivö Klack | Latest Early Campanian | Trace fossils; polychaete encrusters in rock | A serpulid; common and medium-large species | | Glomerula |
| 'Unidentified' sp. D | – | Ivö Klack | Latest Early Campanian | Trace fossils; polychaete encrusters in rock | A serpulid; rare and large species | | Glomerula |
| Unidentified GMI 201b | – | Ivö Klack | Latest Early Campanian | Trace fossils; polychaete encrusters in rock | A serpulid; rare and medium-sized species | | Glomerula |
| Unidentified GMI 205 | – | Ivö Klack | Latest Early Campanian | Trace fossils; polychaete encrusters in rock | A serpulid; rare and medium-sized species | | Glomerula |
| Unidentified GMI 1910 | – | Ivö Klack | Latest Early Campanian | Trace fossils; polychaete encrusters in rock | A serpulid; rare and large species | | Glomerula |
| Unidentified GMI 1915 | – | Ivö Klack | Latest Early Campanian | Trace fossils; polychaete encrusters in rock | A serpulid; rare and large species | | Glomerula |
| Vermiliopsis | V. mammeata | Ivö Klack | Latest Early Campanian | Trace fossils; polychaete encrusters in rock | A serpulid; rare and medium-sized species, the genus survives to the present day | | Glomerula |

=== Sponges ===
Fossil sponges have been recovered at fossil sites in the Kristianstad Basin.

=== Starfish ===
Fossils of starfish have been found at several sites in the Kristianstad Basin. According to Surlyk & Sørenson (2010) there were 16 distinct species of starfish present at Ivö Klack alone.

== Flora ==
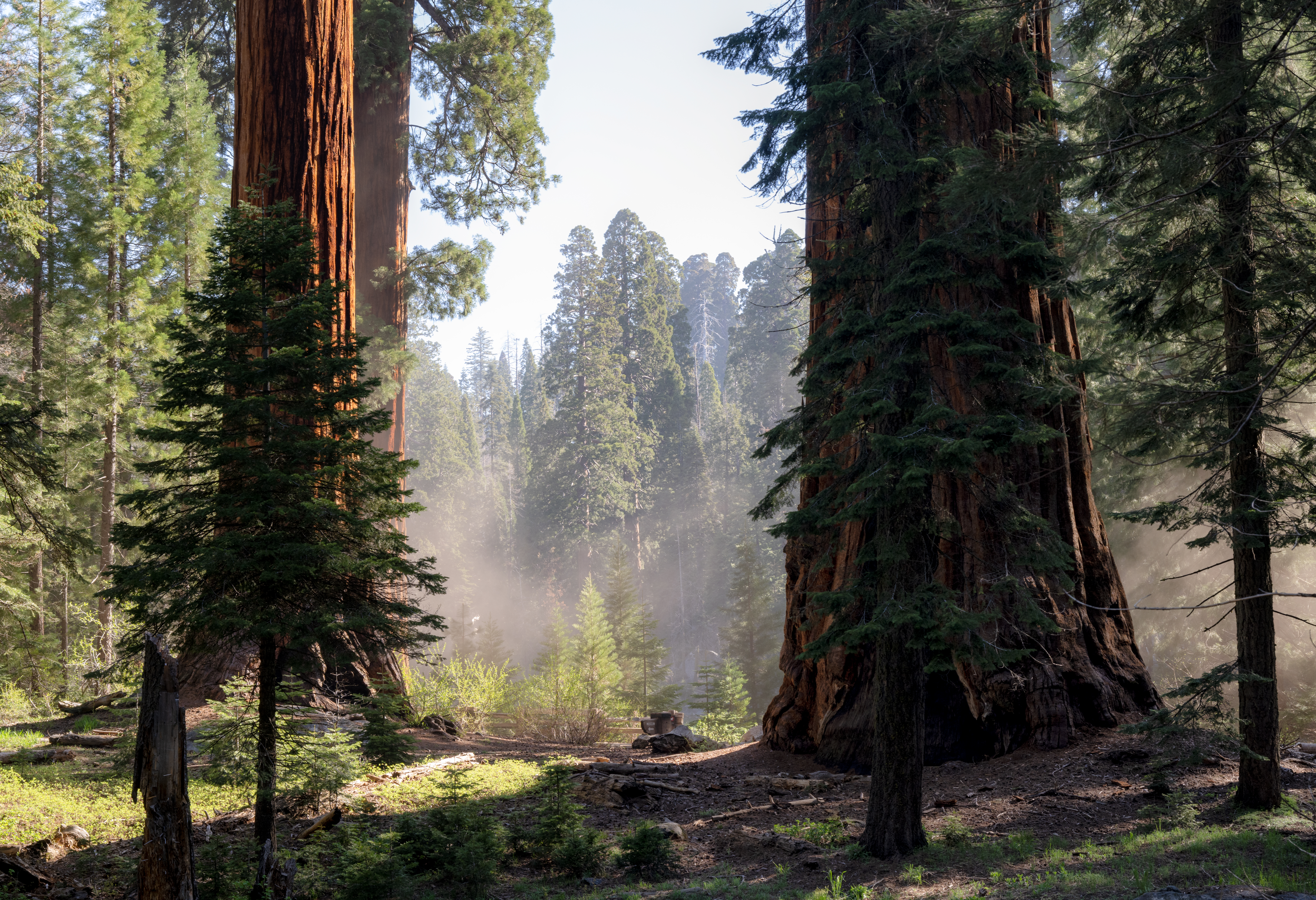
Inner coastal forested areas would be dominated by Sequoioideae coniferous trees, in a similar way to modern Sequoia National Park

The Campanian flora of the Kristianstad Basin thrived in a warm, humid, temperate to subtropical environment, likely a lush, forested floodplain or coastal wetland adjacent to a shallow marine embayment. The presence of abundant dinoflagellates and marine invertebrates in the palynological and fossil assemblages suggests that plant remains were transported from nearby terrestrial habitats into a nearshore marine setting. The dominance of thermophilic angiosperms like Debeyea haldemiana, alongside cycadophytes and conifers, points to a climate with high temperatures and significant rainfall, supporting dense vegetation, while absence of mangrove-specific taxa and the presence of floodplain-associated genera indicate that the flora originated from inland forests or wetlands rather than intertidal mangroves.

Lycophyta Megaspores from the Åsen locality include Triletes, Verrutriletes, Baculitriletes, Echitriletes, and Richnospora. The paleoenvironment suggests a terrestrial to marginal aquatic setting, likely a wetland or floodplain with periodic inundation, supporting lush vegetation, as indicated by megaspores, fossil flowers, and Normapolles pollen grains. Modern analogues are freshwater marshes, swamps, or lake margins where Isoetes grow in shallow, nutrient-rich waters with emergent or submerged vegetation.

Local flowers have been found preserved as excepcional 3D fossils, atributted to their charcoal composition. These fossils where probably washed out into litter acummulations after local forest fires. No strong evidence supports mangroves in the Campanian at Åsen. Fossil stems with mangrove-like habits lack modern mangrove adaptations and were likely freshwater or marginally marine.

| Color key: Taxon / Reclassified taxon / Taxon falsely reported as present / Dubious taxon or junior synonym / Ichnotaxon / Ootaxon / Morphotaxon | Notes; Uncertain or tentative taxa are in small text; ~~crossed out~~ taxa are discredited. |

=== Gymnosperms ===
| Genus | Species | Sites | Age | Material | Notes | Ref | Images |
|---|---|---|---|---|---|---|---|
| Brachyphyllum | B. sp. | Uncertain | Upper Santonian or Lower Campanian | Branches with leaves | Araucariaceae branches | | |
| Cedroxylon | C. ryedalense | Ryedal | Upper Santonian or Lower Campanian | Wood | Pinaceae wood | | |
| Cyparissidium | C.? sp | Svenstorps möla | Lower Campanian | Coniferous axes | Cupressaceae axes | | |
| Elatidopsis | E. nykvistii | Åsen | Upper Santonian or Lower Campanian | Coniferous axes | Cupressaceae axes | | |
| Fricia | F. nathorstii | Åsen | Upper Santonian or Lower Campanian | Coniferous axes | Cupressaceae axes | | |
| Geinitzia | G. sp. | Ryedal | Upper Santonian or Lower Campanian | Coniferous axes | Coniferophyta | | |
| Quasisequoia | Q. florinii | Åsen | Upper Santonian or Lower Campanian | Coniferous axes | Sequoioideae axes | | Extant Sequoioideae |
| Quasisequoia | Q. scanica | Åsen | Upper Santonian or Lower Campanian | Coniferous axes | Sequoioideae axes | | Extant Sequoioideae |
| Quasisequoia | Q. aasenensis | Åsen | Upper Santonian or Lower Campanian | Coniferous axes | Sequoioideae axes | | Extant Sequoioideae |
| Quasisequoia | Q. suecica | Åsen | Upper Santonian or Lower Campanian | Coniferous axes | Sequoioideae axes | | Extant Sequoioideae |
| Paracryptomeria | P. elegans | Åsen | Upper Santonian or Lower Campanian | Coniferous axes | Cupressaceae axes | | |
| Sequoites | S. holstii | Ryedal | Upper Santonian or Lower Campanian | Wood | Sequoioideae wood | | |

=== Angiosperms ===
| Genus | Species | Sites | Age | Material | Notes | Ref | Images |
|---|---|---|---|---|---|---|---|
| Antiquocarya | A. verruculosa | Åsen | Upper Santonian or Lower Campanian | Flowers | Juglandinae Flowers | | |
| Antiquocarya | A. nuda | Åsen | Upper Santonian or Lower Campanian | Flowers | Juglandinae Flowers | | |
| Actinocalyx | A. bohrii | Åsen | Upper Santonian or Lower Campanian | Flowers | Diapensiaceae Flower | | Extant Diapensiaceae |
| Archamamelis | A. bivalvis | Åsen | Upper Santonian or Lower Campanian | Flowers | Hamamelidaceae Flower | | Extant Hamamelidaceae |
| Caryanthus | C. knoblochii | Åsen | Upper Santonian or Lower Campanian | Flowers | Juglandinae Flowers | | |
| Caryanthus | C. deltoides | Åsen | Upper Santonian or Lower Campanian | Flowers | Juglandinae Flowers | | |
| Chloranthistemon | C. endressii | Åsen | Upper Santonian or Lower Campanian | Androecia | Chloranthaceae Androecia | | Extant Chloranthaceae |
| Chloranthistemon | C. alatus | Åsen | Upper Santonian or Lower Campanian | Androecia | Chloranthaceae Androecia | | Extant Chloranthaceae |
| Debeya | D. (Dewalquea) haldemiana | Ingelstorp; Tosterup | Lower Campanian | Leaves | Eudicotyledoneae | | |
| Icacinoxylon | I. sp. 2 | Åsen | Upper Santonian or Lower Campanian | Wood | Icacinaceae Wood | | Extant Icacinaceae |
| Manningia | M. crassa | Åsen | Upper Santonian or Lower Campanian | Flowers | Juglandinae Flowers | | |
| Palmacites | P. filigranus | Ryedal | Upper Santonian or Lower Campanian | Leaves | Palmae leaves | | |
| Platananthus | P. scanicus | Åsen | Upper Santonian or Lower Campanian | Staminate inflorescences | Platanaceae Inflorescences | | Extant Platanaceae Inflorescences |
| Platananthus | P. sp. | Åsen | Upper Santonian or Lower Campanian | Staminate inflorescences | Platanaceae Inflorescences | | Extant Platanaceae Inflorescences |
| Scandianthus | S. costatus | Åsen | Upper Santonian or Lower Campanian | Flowers | Saxifragales Flower | | |
| Scandianthus | S. major | Åsen | Upper Santonian or Lower Campanian | Flowers | Saxifragales Flower | | |
| Silvianthemum | S. suecicum | Åsen | Upper Santonian or Lower Campanian | Flowers | Escalloniaceae Flower | | Extant Escalloniaceae |

== See also ==
- List of fossil sites (with link directory)
- List of dinosaur-bearing rock formations
- Paleobiota of the Niobrara Formation
