= Janua pagenstecheri =

Scientific classification
- Kingdom: Animalia
- Phylum: Annelida
- Clade: Pleistoannelida
- Clade: Sedentaria
- Order: Sabellida
- Family: Serpulidae
- Genus: Janua
- Species: J. pagenstecheri

Binomial name
- Janua pagenstecheri (Quatrefages, 1865)

Synonyms
- Spirorbis pagenstecheri Quatrefages, 1866

Species of annelid worm

Janua pagenstecheri is a species of marine polychaete. It is widely distributed around the British Isles and across north-western Europe, and has been described as "probably the commonest spirorbid in the world".

Janua pagenstecheri lives attached to substrates such as seaweeds including Corallina officinalis, rocks, stones, shells, and the carapaces of crabs. J. pagenstecheri inhabits a shell made of calcium carbonate in the form of a dextral spiral, with the tube up to 2 mm in diameter. The animal exists in two colour morphs: one bright yellow, which occurs in shallow water, and one much paler, which occurs in deeper water. It differs from Spirorbis spirorbis in that S. spirorbis retains its eggs in the tube, while J. pagenstecheri incubates them a few at a time in its operculum, and grows a new cap for the operculum after releasing the embryos.

The species was described by Armand de Quatrefages in 1865, and named after Heinrich Alexander Pagenstecher, professor of zoology at the University of Heidelberg and the first director of the Hamburg natural history museum.
