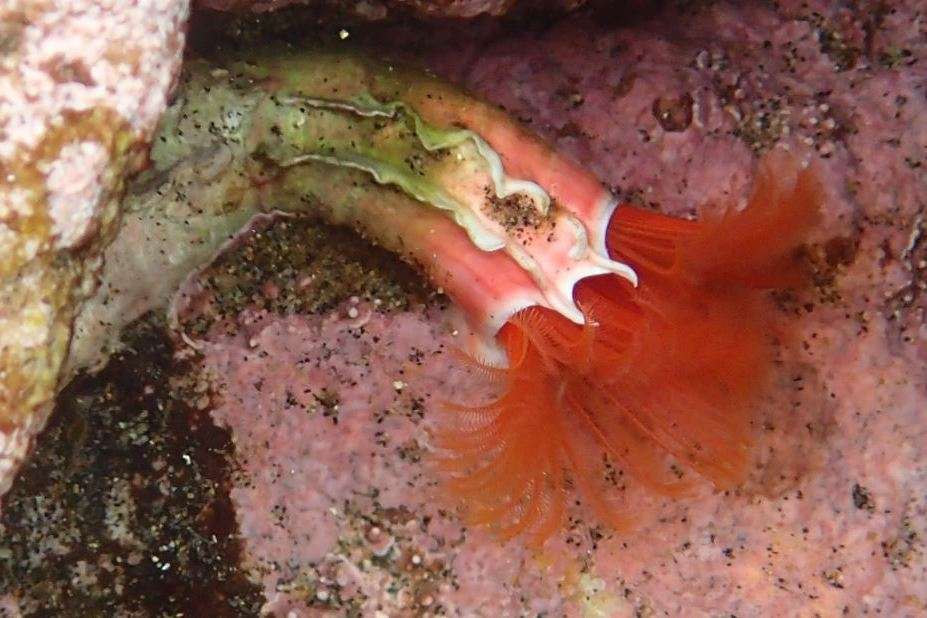

Scientific classification
- Kingdom: Animalia
- Phylum: Annelida
- Clade: Pleistoannelida
- Clade: Sedentaria
- Order: Sabellida
- Family: Serpulidae
- Genus: Galeolaria
- Species: G. hystrix

Binomial name
- Galeolaria hystrix Mörch, 1863

= Galeolaria hystrix =

Species of annelid

Galeolaria hystrix is a serpulid worm of the family Serpulidae, endemic to southern Australia and New Zealand.

== Ecology ==
They form aggregations that increase local biodiversity, alter sediments, and provide habitat, food, and shelter for many organisms in their ecosystem.
