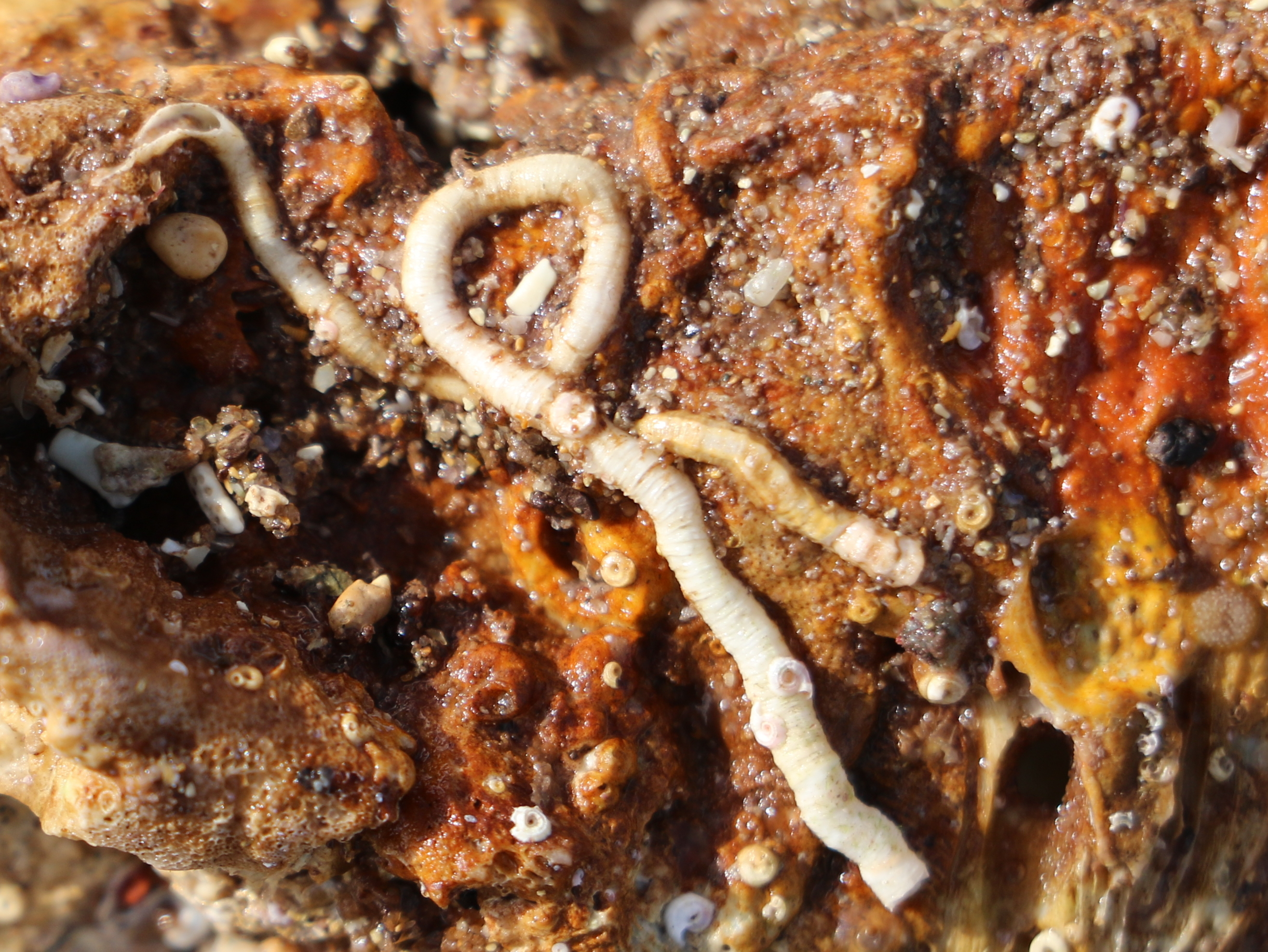
- Long Reef, Australia
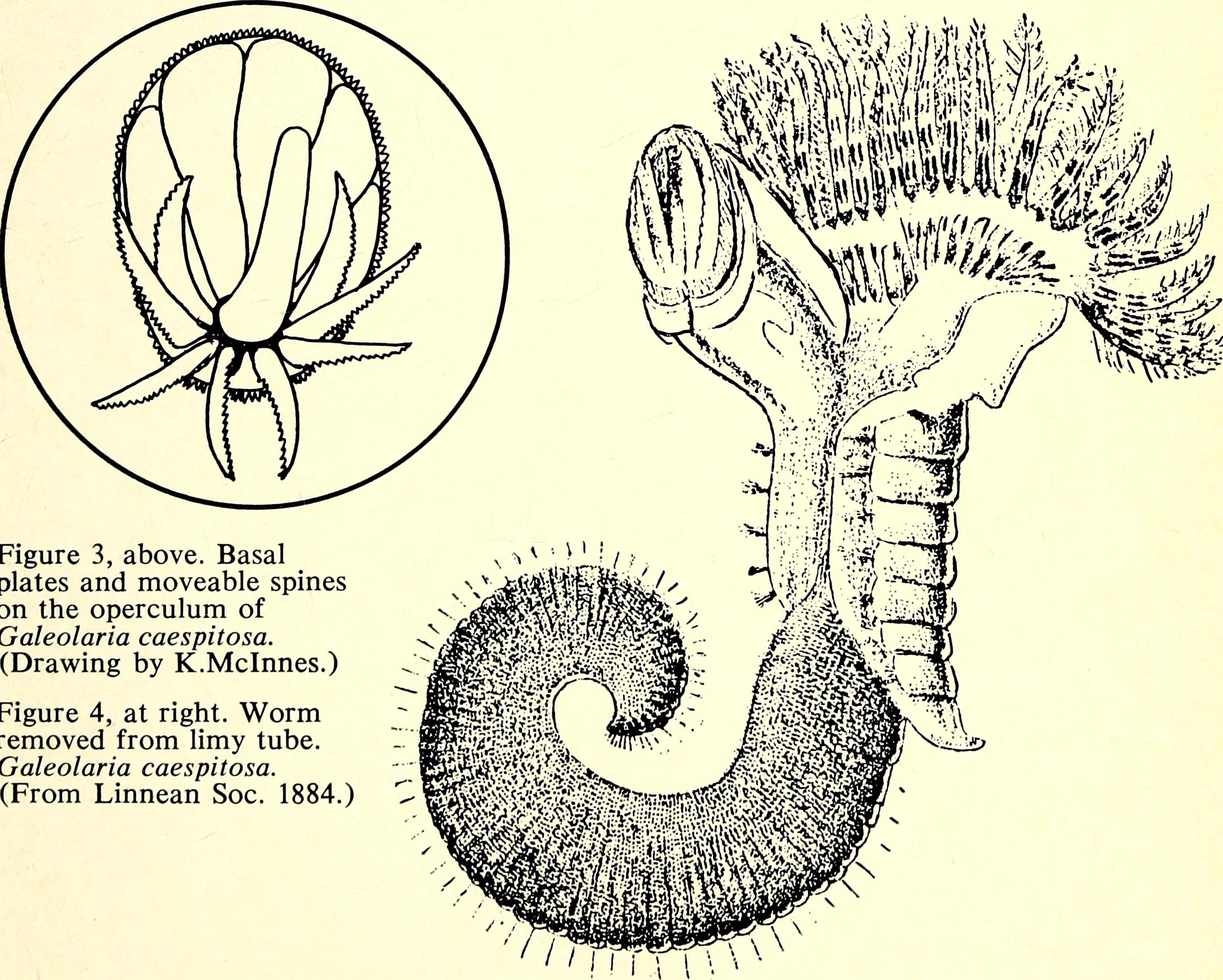

Scientific classification
- Kingdom: Animalia
- Phylum: Annelida
- Clade: Pleistoannelida
- Clade: Sedentaria
- Order: Sabellida
- Family: Serpulidae
- Genus: Galeolaria
- Species: G. caespitosa

Binomial name
- Galeolaria caespitosa Lamarck 1818

= Galeolaria caespitosa =

intertidal tube worm

Species of annelid

Galeolaria caespitosa is a worm of the family Serpulidae, casually referred to as Sydney coral when found in dense aggregations. It is an Australian inter-tidal tube worm which lives within a hard tube like shell, which prevents desiccation at high tide. Black feathery gills emerge when it is underwater for it to filter feed on plankton.
