= Pileolaria =

Pileolaria may refer to:

- Pileolaria (fungus), a genus of rust fungi in the family Pileolariaceae
- Pileolaria (annelid), a genus of polychaete worms in the family Serpulidae
