= Janua =

Scientific classification
- Kingdom: Animalia
- Phylum: Annelida
- Clade: Pleistoannelida
- Clade: Sedentaria
- Order: Sabellida
- Family: Serpulidae
- Genus: Janua; Saint-Joseph, 1894

Type species
- Spirorbis pagenstecheri Quatrefages, 1866

Synonyms
- Mera Saint-Joseph, 1894

Genus of annelids

Janua is a genus of polychaetes, containing the following subgenera and species:

Dexiospira Caullery & Mesnil, 1897

- Janua ainu Uchida, 1971
- Janua bushi (Rioja, 1942)
- Janua ceylonica (Pillai, 1960)
- Janua corrugata (Montagu, 1803)
- Janua glossoeides Harris, 1968
- Janua karaitivensis (Pillai, 1960)
- Janua marioni (Caullery & Mesnil, 1897)
- Janua nipponicus (Okuda, 1934)
- Janua oshoroensis Uchida, 1971
- Janua pagenstecheri (de Quatrefages, 1865)
- Janua preacuta Vine, 1972
- Janua pusilloides (Bush, 1905)
- Janua quasiacuta Lommerzheim, 1981 †
- Janua semidentata (Bush, 1905)
- Janua spirillum (Linnaeus, 1758)
- Janua tricornigerus (Rioja, 1942)
- Janua turrita Vine, 1972

Fauveldora Knight-Jones, 1972

- Janua anticorrugata Vine, 1972
- Janua kayi Knight-Jones, 1972

Pillaiospira

- Janua natalensis Knight-Jones & Knight-Jones, 1974
- Janua trifuscata Knight-Jones, 1973

Incertae sedis

- Janua echinata (Wesenberg-Lund, 1953)
- Janua formosa (Bush, 1904)
- Janua pseudocorrugata (Bush, 1904)
- Janua steueri (Sterzinger, 1909)
