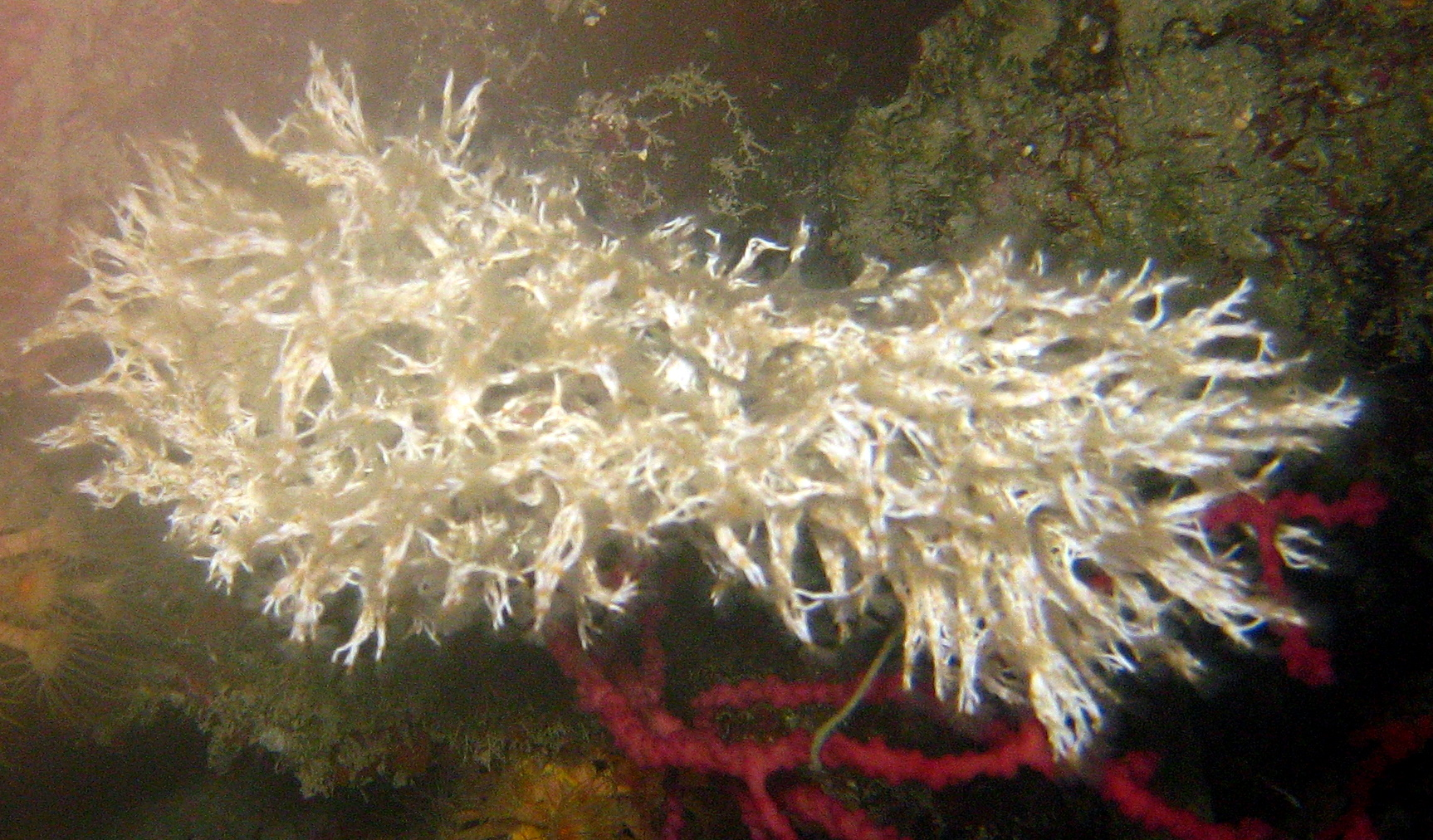

Scientific classification
- Domain: Eukaryota
- Kingdom: Animalia
- Phylum: Annelida
- Clade: Pleistoannelida
- Clade: Sedentaria
- Order: Sabellida
- Family: Serpulidae
- Genus: Filograna
- Species: F. implexa

Binomial name
- Filograna implexa Berkeley, 1835

= Filograna implexa =

Species of annelid

Filograna implexa is a species of polychaetes belonging to the family Serpulidae.

The species has almost cosmopolitan distribution.
