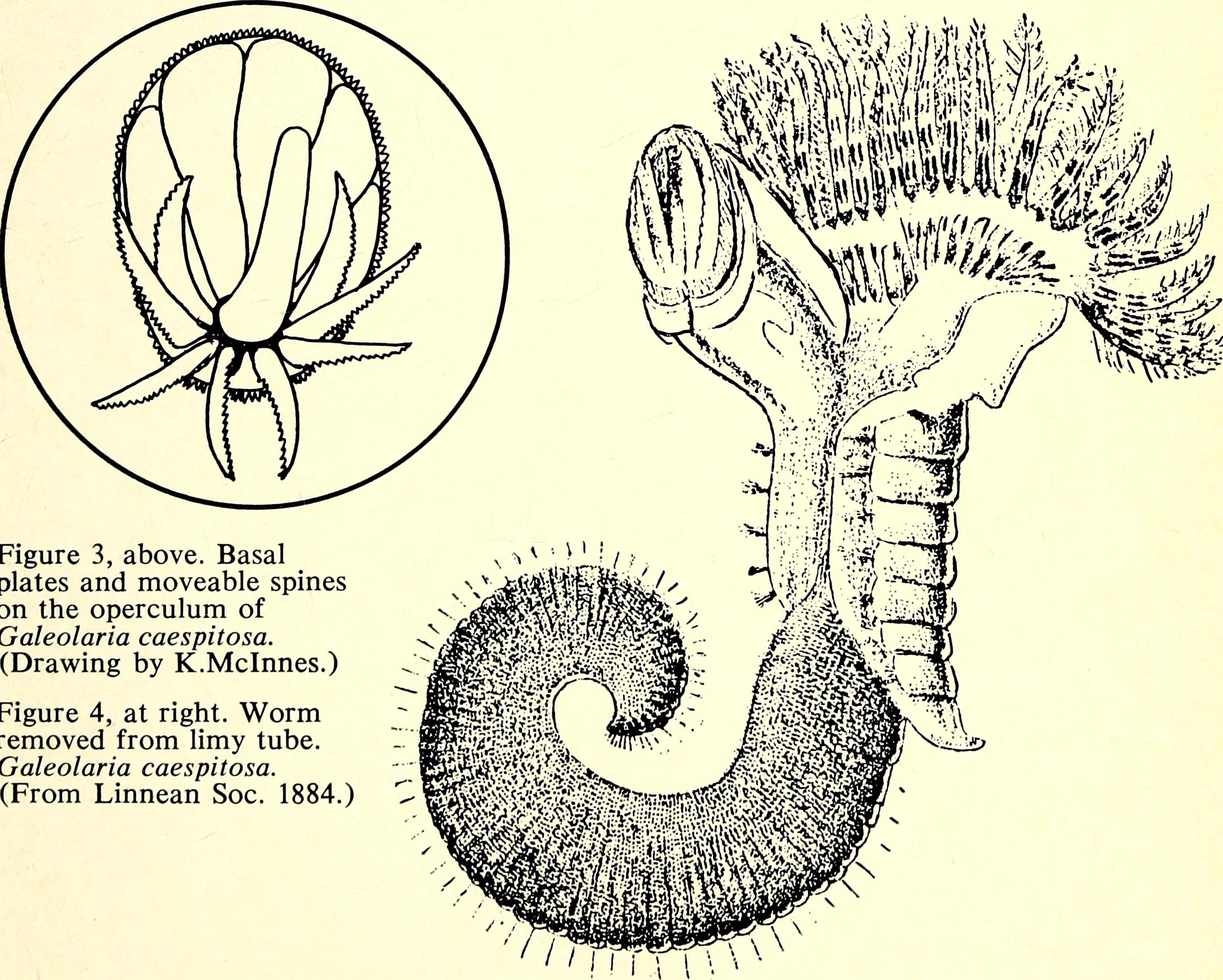
- Illustration

Scientific classification
- Kingdom: Animalia
- Phylum: Annelida
- Clade: Pleistoannelida
- Clade: Sedentaria
- Order: Sabellida
- Family: Serpulidae
- Subfamily: Serpulinae
- Genus: Galeolaria; Lamarck, 1818

Species
- Two; see text

= Galeolaria =

Genus of annelids

Galeolaria is a genus of coastal tube-building annelid fanworms in the family Serpulidae, found from southern Queensland, to New Zealand and southern Australian shores, to Western Australia.

== Description ==
The body is symmetrical, with a branchial crown made up of two lobes, one holding a stalked operculum. The operculum is winged with spines. The operculum seals the tube when the animal retreats into its tube. The tentacles of the branchial crown are used as gills and as a way of capturing food.

Galeolaria build and live within white to grey calcareous tubes, up to 3 cm in length. These tubes may be found singly or in complex interwoven colonies, forming a distinctive zone at the mid tidal regions. They may be so thick and dense that they form a microhabitat for many other creatures. When expose to air at low tide, these animals retreat within their tubes.

== Habitat ==
A distinctive zone-forming species with its upper limit at the lowest neap water high-water mark. Isolated tubes may be found at any level, even above the highest tide, only being wetted by spray.

== Species ==
The genus contains two described species:

- Galeolaria caespitosa Lamarck, 1818
- Galeolaria hystrix Mörch, 1863
