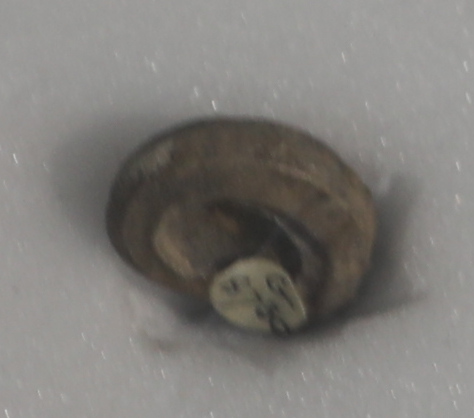
- Rotularia concava fossil

Scientific classification
- Kingdom: Animalia
- Phylum: Annelida
- Clade: Pleistoannelida
- Clade: Sedentaria
- Order: Sabellida
- Family: Serpulidae
- Genus: †Rotularia; Defrance, 1827

= Rotularia =

Rotularia Temporal range: Kimmeridgian–Eocene (Jäger, 2004)

Genus of annelids

Rotularia is an extinct genus of planispirally coiled fossil polychaete worms in the family Serpulidae. Owing to the gastropod-like shape of Rotularia, many authors in the past interpreted this genus as being sea snails in the family Vermetidae. The Rotularia is approximately 5 inches in length. This is an estimate from the 151 confirmed fossil discoveries.

== Description ==
All Rotularia species were cemented to the substrate during their earliest growth stage, but they became detached shortly after the formation of the first whorls (Savazzi, 1995). Rotularia originates in shallow marine environments. Their tubes have two layers with different microstructure (Vinn, 2008). This genus is known from the early Kimmeridgian to Late Eocene (Jäger, 2004).
