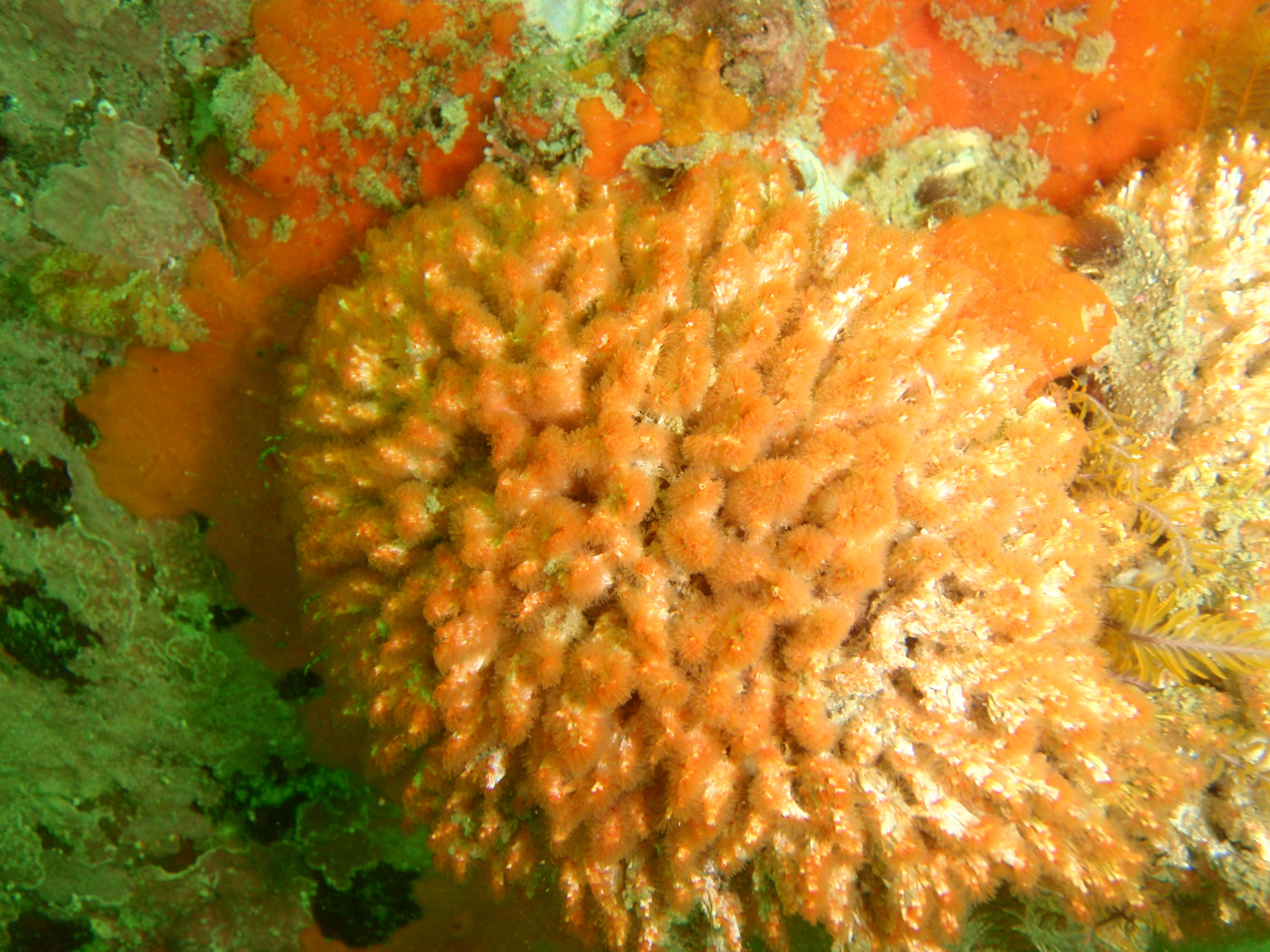

Scientific classification
- Kingdom: Animalia
- Phylum: Annelida
- Clade: Pleistoannelida
- Clade: Sedentaria
- Order: Sabellida
- Family: Serpulidae
- Subfamily: Filograninae
- Genus: Filograna; Berkeley, 1835

Species
- See text

= Filograna =

Genus of annelids

Filograna is a genus of marine polychaete worms in the family Serpulidae.

== Species ==
The following species are classified in this genus:

- Filograna conglobatula Lommerzheim, 1979 †
- Filograna implexa Berkeley, 1835

== Synonyms ==
The following genera are synonyms of Filograna:

- Filigrana Mörch, 1863 (junior synonym)
- Filipora Fleming, 1828 (nomen oblitum)
