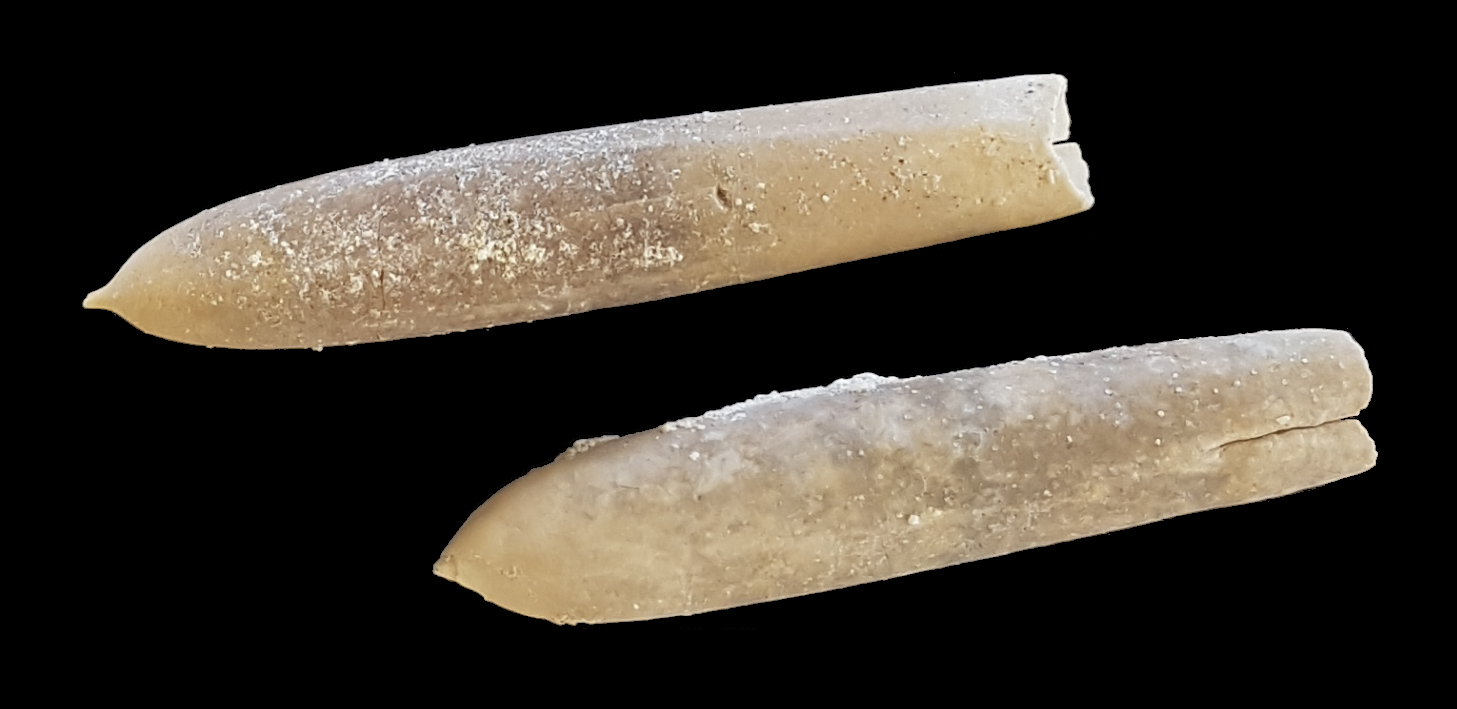
- B. mammilatus found in the Kristianstad Basin, Sweden

Scientific classification
- Domain: Eukaryota
- Kingdom: Animalia
- Phylum: Mollusca
- Class: Cephalopoda
- Superorder: †Belemnoidea
- Genus: †Belemnellocamax

= Belemnellocamax =

Belemnellocamax Temporal range: 84.9–70.6 Ma

Extinct genus of molluscs

Belemnellocamax is a genus of belemnite, an extinct group of cephalopods.

== See also ==
- Belemnite
- List of belemnites
