= Vermiliopsis =

Scientific classification
- Kingdom: Animalia
- Phylum: Annelida
- Clade: Pleistoannelida
- Clade: Sedentaria
- Order: Sabellida
- Family: Serpulidae
- Genus: Vermiliopsis; Saint-Joseph, 1894

Genus of annelids

Vermiliopsis is a genus of polychaetes belonging to the family Serpulidae.

The genus has cosmopolitan distribution.

Species:

- Vermiliopsis annulata (Schmarda, 1861)
- Vermiliopsis ctenophora (Moore & Bush, 1904)
- Vermiliopsis cylindrica Pillai, 2009
- Vermiliopsis dubia (Schmarda, 1861)
- Vermiliopsis fluctuata (Sowerby, 1829)
- Vermiliopsis glacialis Monro, 1939
- Vermiliopsis glandigera Gravier, 1906
- Vermiliopsis infundibulum (Philippi, 1844)
- Vermiliopsis labiata (O.G.Costa, 1861)
- Vermiliopsis leptochaeta Pillai, 1971
- Vermiliopsis longiseta (Bush, 1910)
- Vermiliopsis minuta Straughan, 1967
- Vermiliopsis monodiscus Zibrowius, 1968
- Vermiliopsis multiannulata (Moore, 1923)
- Vermiliopsis negevensis Vinn & Wilson, 2010
- Vermiliopsis notialis Monro, 1930
- Vermiliopsis pluriannulata (Moore & Bush, 1904)
- Vermiliopsis producta (Benham, 1927)
- Vermiliopsis pygidialis (Willey, 1905)
- Vermiliopsis spirorbis (Langerhans, 1884)
- Vermiliopsis striaticeps (Grube, 1862)
- Vermiliopsis zibrowii Nogueira & Abbud, 2009
