= Pileolaria (annelid) =

Scientific classification
- Kingdom: Animalia
- Phylum: Annelida
- Clade: Pleistoannelida
- Clade: Sedentaria
- Order: Sabellida
- Family: Serpulidae
- Genus: Pileolaria; Claparède, 1868

Genus of worms

Pileolaria is a genus of polychaete worms in the Serpulidae family. Pileolaria are marine worms that have a global distribution. This genus was first described by René-Édouard Claparède in 1868.
