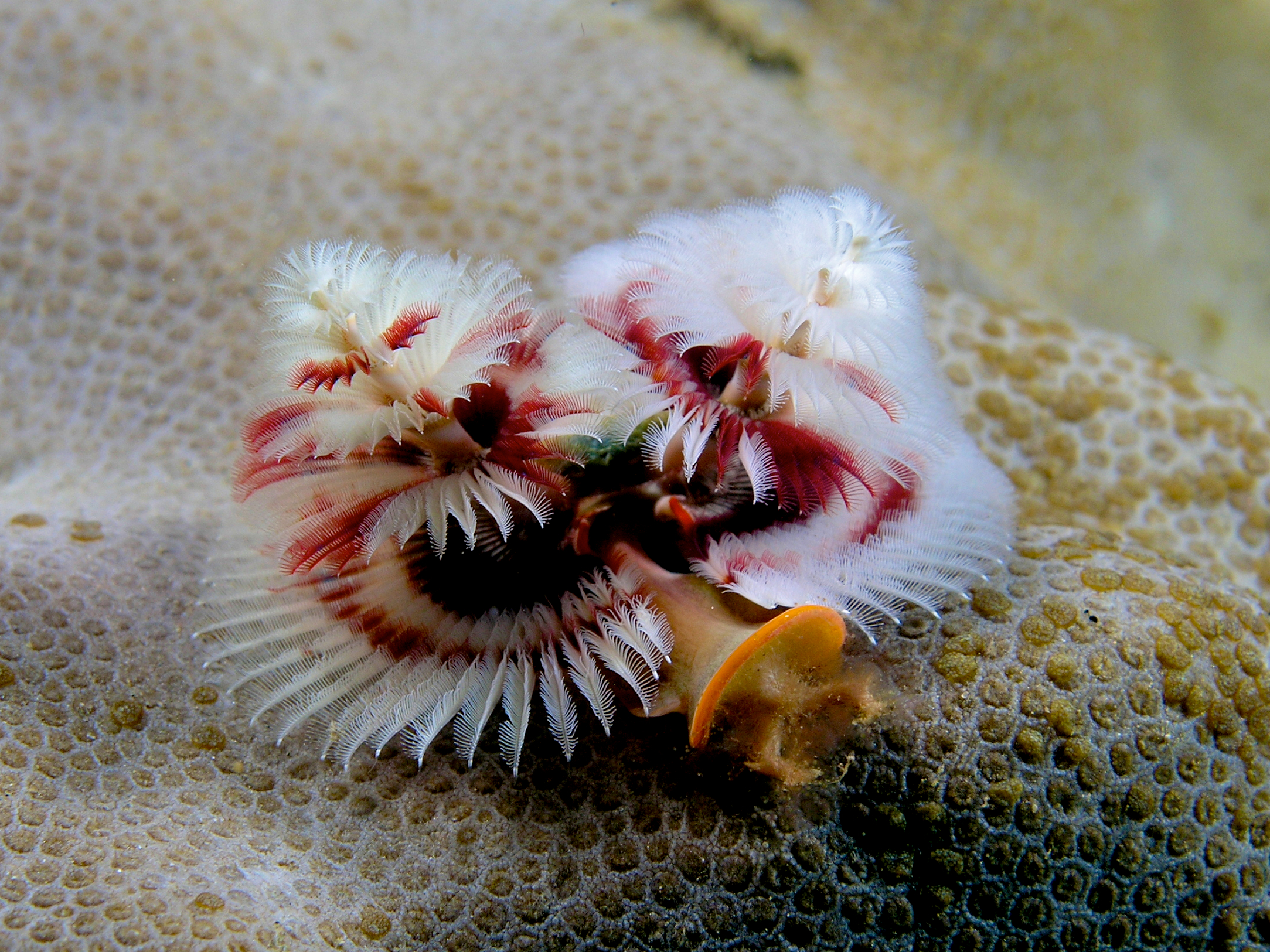
- Spirobranchus giganteus is a species of tubeworm belonging to the Serpulidae family. Note the yellowish cartilaginous operculum extending from the branchial stalk.

Scientific classification
- Kingdom: Animalia
- Phylum: Annelida
- Clade: Pleistoannelida
- Clade: Sedentaria
- Order: Sabellida
- Family: Serpulidae; Rafinesque, 1815

Genera
- See text

= Serpulidae =

Serpulidae Temporal range: Middle Permian (Wordian)-Present

Family of annelids

The Serpulidae are a family of sessile, tube-building annelid worms in the class Polychaeta. The members of this family differ from other sabellid tube worms in that they have a specialized operculum that blocks the entrance of their tubes when they withdraw into the tubes. In addition, serpulids secrete tubes of calcium carbonate. Serpulids are the most important biomineralizers among annelids. About 300 species in the family Serpulidae are known, all but one of which live in saline waters. The earliest serpulids are known from the Permian (Wordian to late Permian).

The blood of most species of serpulid and sabellid worms contains the oxygen-binding pigment chlorocruorin. This is used to transport oxygen to the tissues. It has an affinity for carbon monoxide which is 570 times as strong as that of the haemoglobin found in human blood.

Empty serpulid shells can sometimes be confused with the shells of a family of marine gastropod mollusks, the Vermetidae or worm snails. The most obvious difference is that serpulid shells are dull inside, whereas the molluscan vermetid shells are shiny inside.

== Selected genera ==
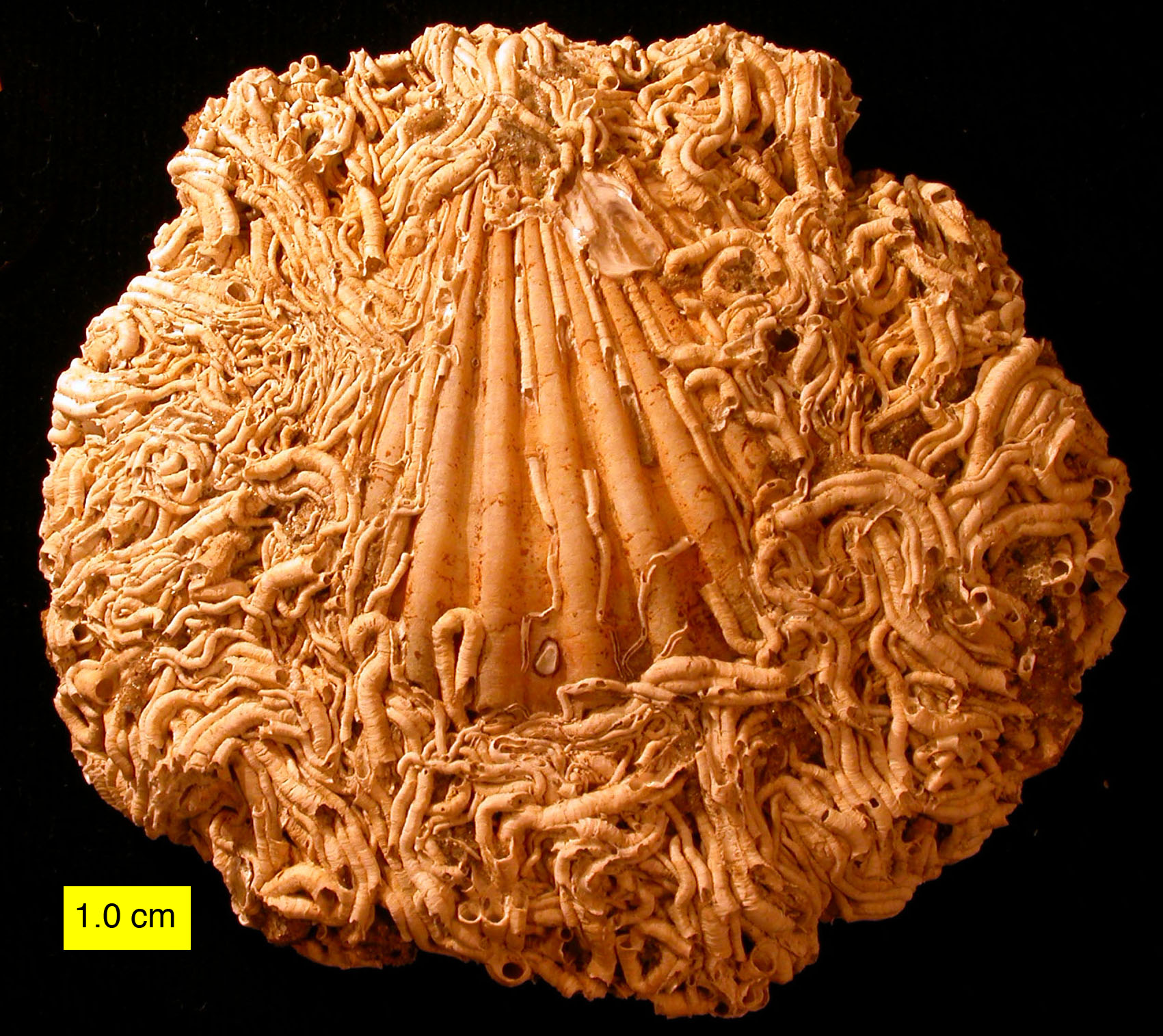
Pecten sp. with serpulid worm encrusters; Duck Harbor Beach on Cape Cod Bay, Wellfleet, Massachusetts.

- Amplicaria Knight-Jones, 1984
- Anomalorbis Vine, 1972
- Apomatus Philippi, 1844
- Bathyvermilia Zibrowius, 1973
- Bushiella Knight-Jones, 1973
- Capeospira Pillai, 1970
- Chitinopoma Levinsen, 1884
- Circeis Saint-Joseph, 1894
- Crucigera Benedict, 1887
- Dextralia Knight-Jones, 1973
- Ditrupa Berkeley, 1835
- Eulaeospira Pillai, 1970
- Ficopomatus Sauthern, 1921
- Filograna Berkeley, 1835
- Filogranella Ben-Eliahu and Dafni, 1979
- Filogranula Langerhans, 1884
- Galeolaria Lamarck, J.B. de (1818)
- Hyalopotamus Marenzeller, 1878
- Hydroides Gunnerus, 1768
- Janua Saint-Joseph, 1894
- Josephella Caullery and Mesnil, 1896
- Leodora Saint-Joseph, 1894
- Marifugia Absolon & Hrabe, 1930
- Metavermilia Bush, 1904
- Neodexiospira Pillai, 1970
- Neovermila Day, 1961
- Nidificaria
- Paradexiospira Caullery and Mesnil, 1897
- Paralaeospira Caullery and Mesnil, 1897
- Pileolaria Claparede, 1870
- Placostegus Philippi, 1844
- Pomatoceros Philippi, 1844
- Pomatoleios Pixell, 1912
- Pomatostegus Schmarda, 1861
- Protolaeospira Pixell, 1912
- Protula Risso, 1826
- Pseudochitinopoma Zibrowius, 1969
- Pseudovermilia Bush, 1907
- †Rotularia Defrance, 1827
- Salmacina Claparede, 1870
- Semivermila Imajima, 1978
- Serpula Linnaeus, 1767 Type genus
- Simplicaria Knight-Jones, 1973
- Spirobranchus Blainville, 1818
- Spirorbis Daudin, 1800
- Turbocavus Prentiss et al., 2014
- Vermiliopsis Saint-Joseph, 1894
- Vinearia
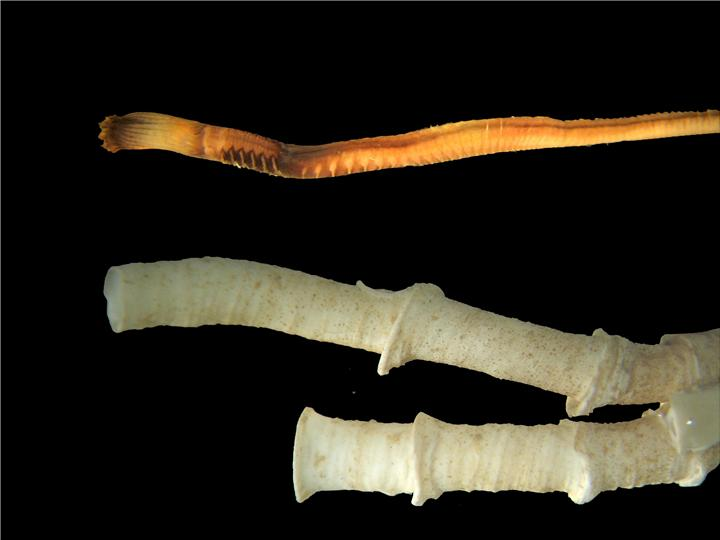
Ficopomatus enigmaticus

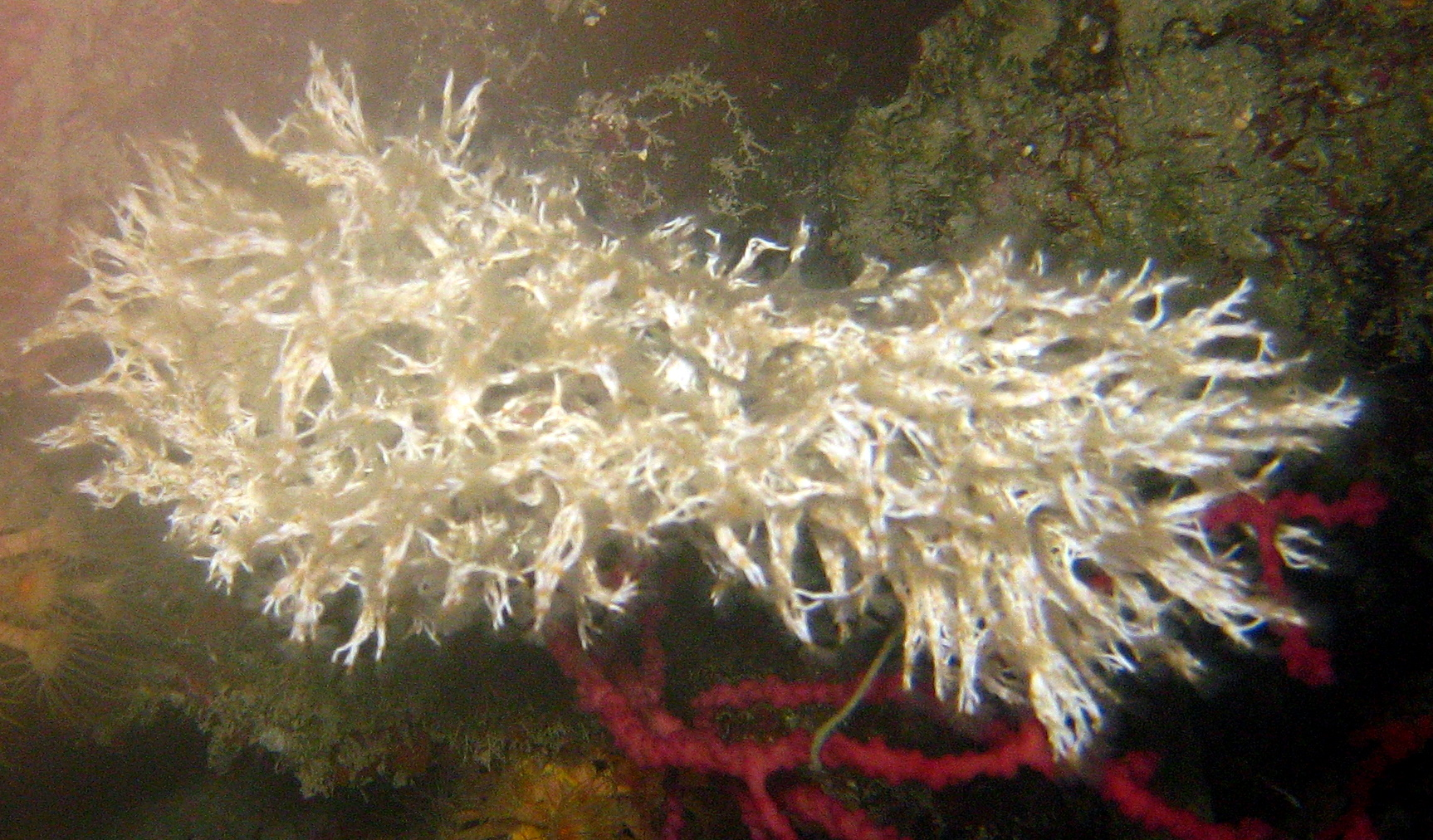
Filograna implexa

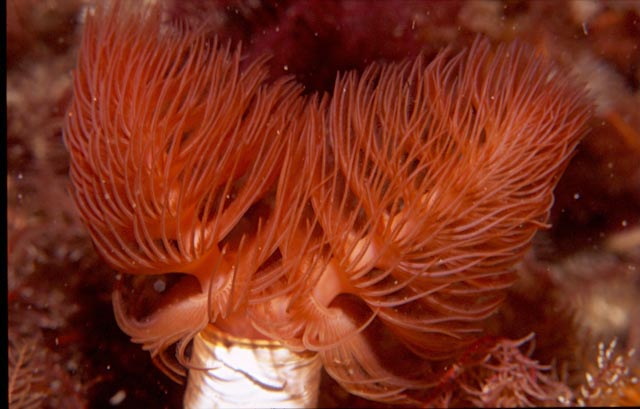
Protula bispiralis

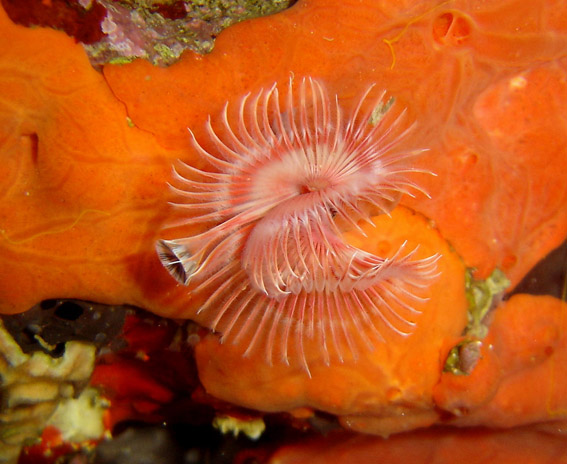
Serpula vermicularis

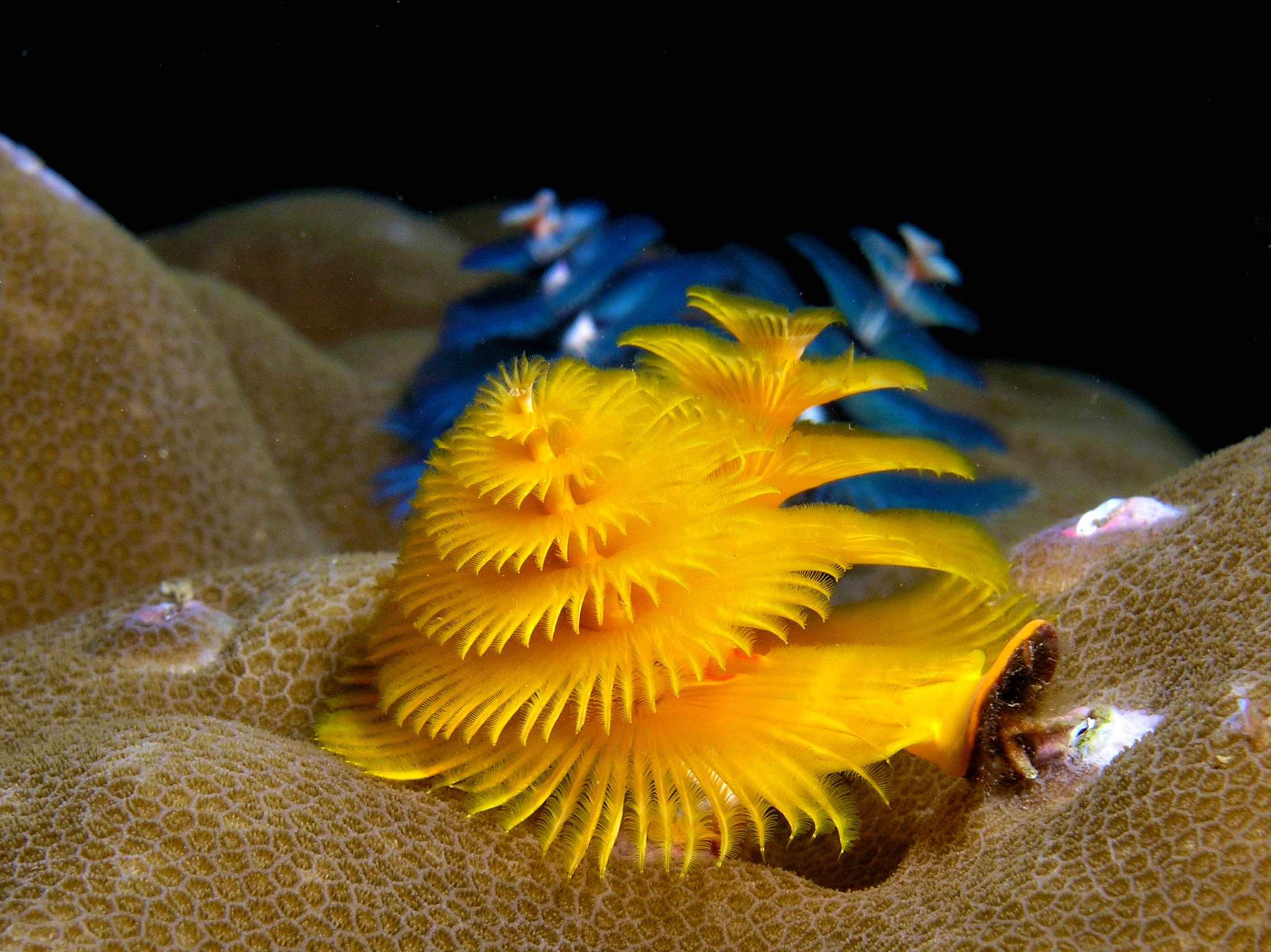
Spirobranchus giganteus

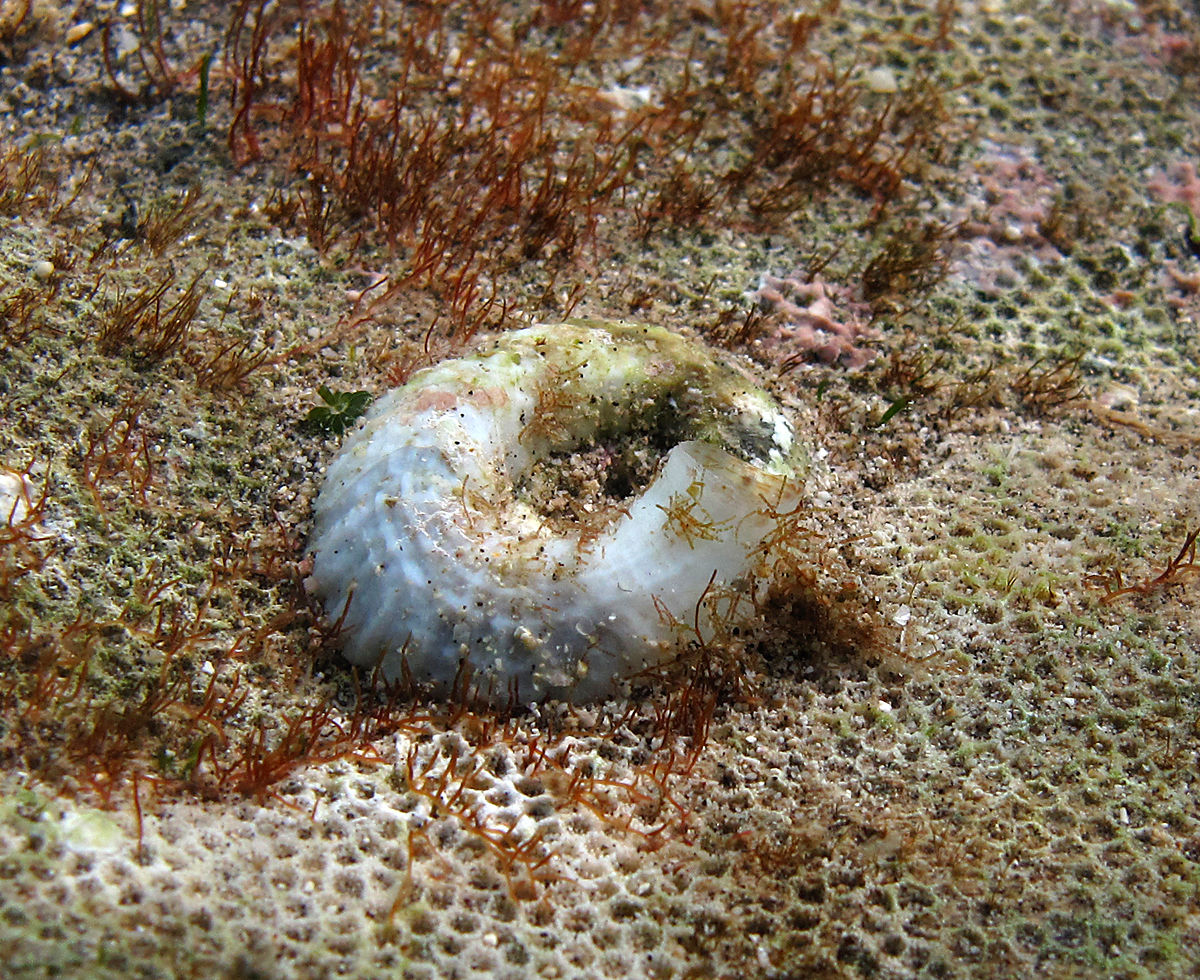
Spirorbis sp.
