= Kristianstad Basin =

Cretaceous geological formation in Skåne, Sweden

- Stratigraphic range: Late Cretaceous, Santonian – Early Maastrichtian, 86.3–71.3 Ma
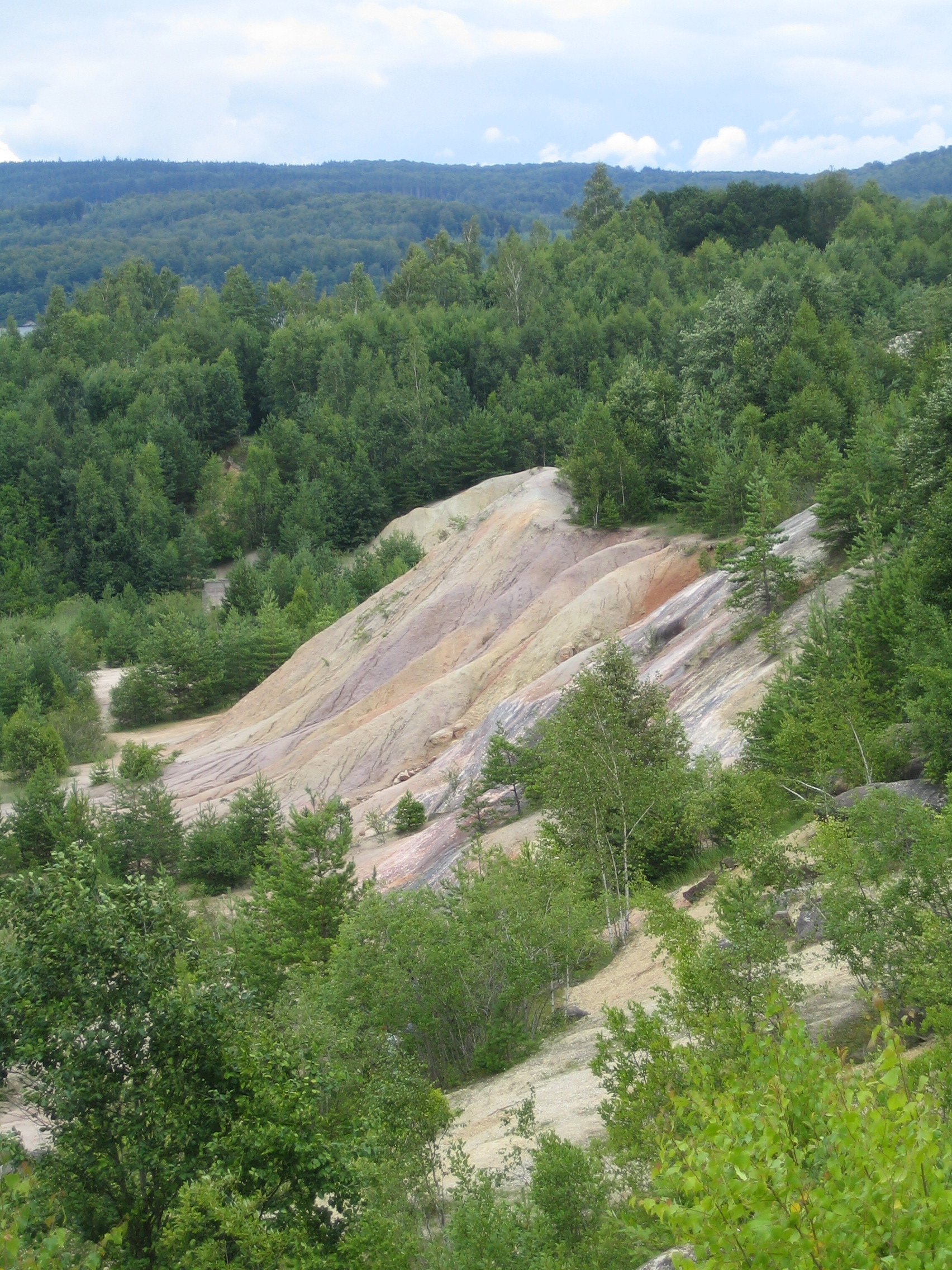
- Kaolinbrottet, one of the quarries at Ivö Klack in the Kristianstad Basin
- Type: Structural basin, geological formation
- Thickness: c. 250 m (820 ft)

Lithology
- Primary: Calcarenite, sandstone
- Other: Conglomerates, flint, oyster banks, sand

Location
- Region: North-eastern Skåne
- Country: Sweden

Type section
- Named for: Kristianstad, Kristianstad Municipality, Skåne County
- Kristianstad Basin (Sweden)

The Kristianstad Basin (Swedish: Kristianstadsbassängen) is a Cretaceous-age structural basin and geological formation in northeastern Skåne, the southernmost province of Sweden. The basin extends from Hanöbukten, a bay in the Baltic Sea, in the east to the town of Hässleholm in the west and ends with the two horsts Linderödsåsen and Nävlingeåsen in the south. The basin's northern boundary is more diffuse and there are several outlying portions of Cretaceous-age sediments. During the Cretaceous, the region was a shallow subtropical to temperate inland sea and archipelago.

Though the sediments in the basin range in age from the Barremian to the earliest Maastrichtian, the only accessible strata are from the Late Cretaceous, ranging in age from the Early or early Middle Santonian to the earliest Maastrichtian. A majority of the fossil sites only expose strata of latest Early Campanian age (c. 80.5 million years ago). Fossils from these sites have been collected since the 18th century, but most of the excavations have taken place through commercial quarrying in the 20th century and paleontological expeditions in the 20th and 21st centuries.

The Early Campanian deposits of the Kristianstad Basin preserve fossils of a diverse array of organisms, including algae, brachiopods, bryozoans, molluscs (notably large numbers of bivalves and belemnites), sea urchins and fish (including a large amount of shark species). The Kristianstad Basin has also yielded fossils of several varieties of reptiles, including plesiosaurs, turtles and crocodylomorphs, as well as one of the most diverse mosasaur faunas in the world and some of the few non-avian dinosaurs known from Sweden.

== Geology ==
=== Geological background ===
The Kristianstad Basin is located in northeastern Skåne, the southernmost province of Sweden, extending from Hanöbukten, a bay in the Baltic Sea, in the east to the town of Hässleholm in the west. The basement of the basin is crystalline and deeply weathered bedrock from the Precambrian. Most of this weathering, and the uneven topography of the basement, is due to the warm and moist climate experienced during the Jurassic or Early Cretaceous. The basement is overlaid by approximately 250 metres (820 feet) of mainly shallow water or marine sediments from the Cretaceous, ranging in age from the Barremian to the earliest Maastrichtian. In addition to the aquatic sediments, there are delta plain deposits of late Santonian to earliest Campanian age, overlaid by marine strata of latest Early Campanian age.

The surface of the basement slopes to the south and is cut off by Linderödsåsen and Nävlingeåsen, two horsts that mark the basin's south-western boundary. To the south-east, the basin's margin is marked by the Baltic Sea while the basin's northern margin is more diffuse, with several small outliers of Cretaceous-age sediments.

During the Late Cretaceous, the basement of the basin was subjected to several regressions and transgressions. The sediments within the basin are dominated by fine- to coarse-grained sandy biocalcarenites (calcarenites that contain fossils) and more or less consolidated sandstones. Conglomeratic beds are also common, typically consisting of belemnite rostra or bivalve shells and coarse terrigenous clastic rocks. There are also several flint beds in the upper parts of the strata, dating to the early Late Campanian through the earliest Maastrichtian. Dominant sediment types from the Early Campanian are oyster banks, calcarenites and calcareous, glauconitic quartz sands.

Accessible strata exposed in the basin range in age from Early or early Middle Santonian to earliest Maastrichtian. A majority of the fossil sites only expose strata of latest Early Campanian age (c. 80.5 million years ago). This strata, the "Belemnellocamax mammillatus"-strata, is exceptionally rich in vertebrate fossils and diversity. The biozones of the Kristianstad Basin, based on the local belemnite fossils, are:

Age	Subdivision	Time (mya)	Belemnite(s)	Ref	Image
Santonian	Early–middle	No precise estimate	Gonioteuthis westfalica westfalica		Some of the belemnite species and belemnite biozones in the Kristianstad Basin
Santonian	Late middle	No precise estimate	Gonioteuthis westfalicagranulata		Some of the belemnite species and belemnite biozones in the Kristianstad Basin
Santonian	Late	No precise estimate	Gonioteuthis granulata		Some of the belemnite species and belemnite biozones in the Kristianstad Basin
Campanian	Earliest	c. 83.5	Gonioteuthis granulaquadrata, Actinocamax verus, Belemnellocamax grossouvrei, Belemnitella alpha		Some of the belemnite species and belemnite biozones in the Kristianstad Basin
Campanian	Latest early	c. 80.5	Belemnellocamax mammillatus, Belemnitella mucronata, Gonioteuthis quadrata scaniensis		Some of the belemnite species and belemnite biozones in the Kristianstad Basin
Campanian	Earliest late	No precise estimate	Belemnellocamax balsvikensis		Some of the belemnite species and belemnite biozones in the Kristianstad Basin
Campanian	Early late	No precise estimate	Belemnitella mucronata		Some of the belemnite species and belemnite biozones in the Kristianstad Basin
Campanian	Middle late	No precise estimate	Belemnitella mucronata		Some of the belemnite species and belemnite biozones in the Kristianstad Basin
Maastrichtian	Earliest	c. 71.3	Belemnella lanceolata		Some of the belemnite species and belemnite biozones in the Kristianstad Basin

=== Prominent fossil sites ===
Map of prominent fossil sites within the Kristianstad Basin

Most of the sites within the Kristianstad Basin are the result of commercial kaolin clay/limestone exploitation. The most prominent sites include:

- Ivö Klack, historically known as Blaksudden, an abandoned and partly overgrown limestone and kaolin quarry on the northern slope of the island Ivö. Ivö Klack was once the shores of a small and rocky Cretaceous island and is one of the most extensively excavated sites in the basin, having been excavated since quarrying activities started in 1888. Though quarrying stopped in the late 1960s, the site continues to be excavated by paleontologists and amateurs.
- Ugnsmunnarna, a partly overgrown cliff section located on the island Ivö, about three kilometers south of Ivö Klack. The rocks at Ugnsmunnarna were deposited in a deeper-water part surrounding the Cretaceous Ivö island.
- Ignaberga, the Ignaberga site compromises two limestone quarries situated along the southern margin of the basin created by Nävlingeåsen.
- Maltesholm, a now disused limestone quarry adjacent to the northern end of Linderödsåsen. With the exception of abundant fragmentary invertebrate fossils, few other fossil remains have been found at Maltesholm.
- Åsen, an abandoned clay pit, presently used as a landfill. The topography of the basement rock, the presence of floodplain sediments and the recovery of fossil hybodont shark teeth suggests that the location was near an ancient river system. One of the most extensively excavated sites in the basin.
- Axeltorp, an abandoned and overgrown limestone quarry.
- Balsberg, a natural cave located on the southwestern slope of the Balsberget hill.
- Ivetofta, a drill core in the town of Bromölla, the sediments penetrated are of latest Early Campanian age.
- Kjuge, a natural cliff section located near the lake Ivösjön.
- Ullstorp, a series of five small quarries (one of which remains active) close to Nävlingeåsen.
- Balsvik, an overgrown quarry which in addition to Campanian rocks also exposes approximately three meters (9 ft) of earliest Maastrichtian strata.

== History of research ==
=== Local paleontological and geological research ===
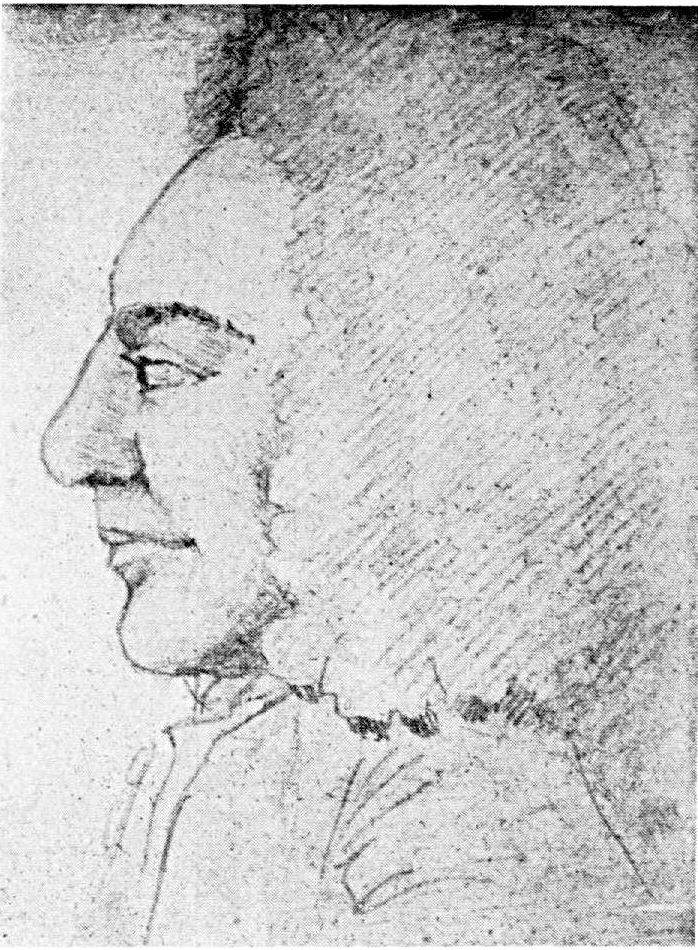
Contemporary pencil drawing of Swedish physician and paleontologist Magnus Bromelius, who first discovered fossils in the Kristianstad Basin in 1725.

The Kristianstad Basin is one of the most prolific and historically famous Mesozoic fossil sites in Scandinavia. The earliest known fossil discoveries within the basin were made by the physician and paleontologist Magnus Bromelius at Ivö Klack and Ignaberga in 1725. Most of the early fossil finds were belemnite fossils, descriptions of which were published by physician and naturalist Kilian Stobæus in 1752 (whose work Opuscula included the first illustrations of the common Belemnellocamax mammillatus belemnites), naturalist Göran Wahlenberg in 1821 and zoologist and archaeologist Sven Nilsson in 1826, 1827, 1835 and 1857. Early sedimentological studies were also conducted throughout the 19th and early 20th centuries, prominently by paleontologist and geologist Bernhard Lundgren in 1888 and geologist Alf Lundegren in 1931 and 1934.

The various limestone and kaolin quarries throughout the basin were described in detail by geologist and paleontologist Karl A. Grönwall in 1915, followed by further descriptions by Alf Lundegren in 1931, geologist Lars Bjerning in 1947, geologist Per H. Lundegårdh in 1971, geologists Jan Bergström and Naz Ahmed Shaikh in 1980 and geologists Mikael Erlström and Jan Gabrielson in 1985 and 1992. Throughout the 20th century, quarrying was most intense at Åsen, Axeltorp and Ivö Klack, most of it conducted by the companies Höganäs keramik and Ifö-verken.

Important historical studies conducted on the basin's many invertebrate taxa include those by Bernhard Lundgren (in 1876, 1885 and 1895), paleontologist J. Christian Moberg in 1884 and 1885, geologist Anders H. Hennig in 1892, 1894 and 1904 (together with paleontologist Alfred Elis Törnebohm), geologist and mineralogist Assar Hadding in 1919, Alf Lundegren in 1934, paleontologist Gustaf Troedsson in 1946 and 1954, paleontologist Richard Hägg in 1954 and geologist and paleontologist Fritz Brotzen in 1960. Further studies on the invertebrate fauna, as with the more publicized vertebrate fossils, have continued into the 21st century.

Actinopterygian (ray-finned) fishes were first described form the basin by Sven Nilsson in 1827, with further studies being conducted by paleontologist John W. Davis in 1890 and by paleontologist Mohamad Bazzi and colleagues in 2016. Though shark teeth have been recovered from the basin since early times, the shark and ray fauna was first studied in detail by paleontologist Mikael Siverson in the 20th century, who in a series of publications from 1989 to 2016, some together with other authors, identified a vast number of species.

Marine reptile fossils, found at Ivetofta, were first described from the basin by Sven Nilsson in 1835. Nilsson's work was followed by further investigations by physicist and chemist Wilhelm Hisinger in 1837, archaeologist and bibliographer Johan Henrik Schröder in 1885 and paleontologist Carl Wiman in 1916. Later studies on marine reptile fossils were also conducted by J. Christian Moberg in 1884 and 1885, Bernhard Lundgren in 1888, Anders H. Hennig in 1910, Alf Lundegren in 1934, Gustaf Troedsson in 1946 and 1954 and prominently in a series of publications of paleontologist Per-Ove Persson, who described several species of mosasaurs and plesiosaurs alongside sea turtles and the crocodylomorph Aigialosuchus, from 1954 to 1996. More recent work on marine reptiles has been conducted primarily by Mikael Siverson and paleontologist Johan Lindgren (especially on mosasaurs) and paleontologists Elisabeth Einarsson, Benjamin P. Kear, Sven Sachs and Torsten M. Scheyer (especially on plesiosaurs and sea turtles).

=== Dinosaur fossils ===
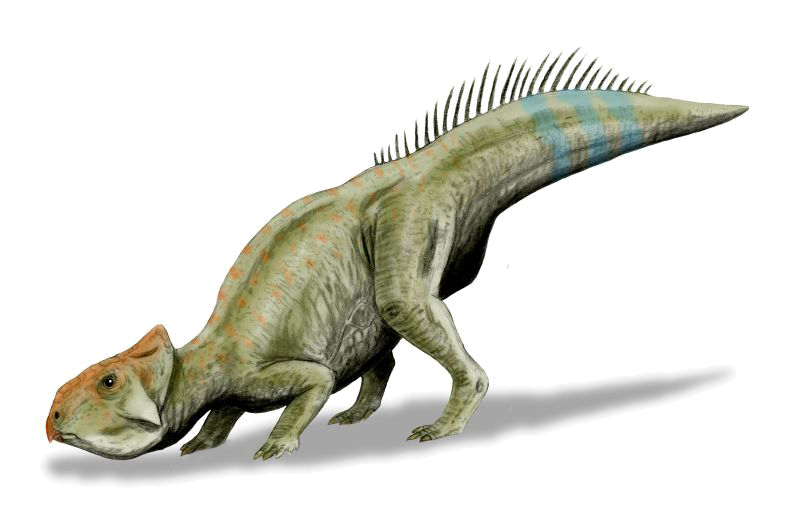
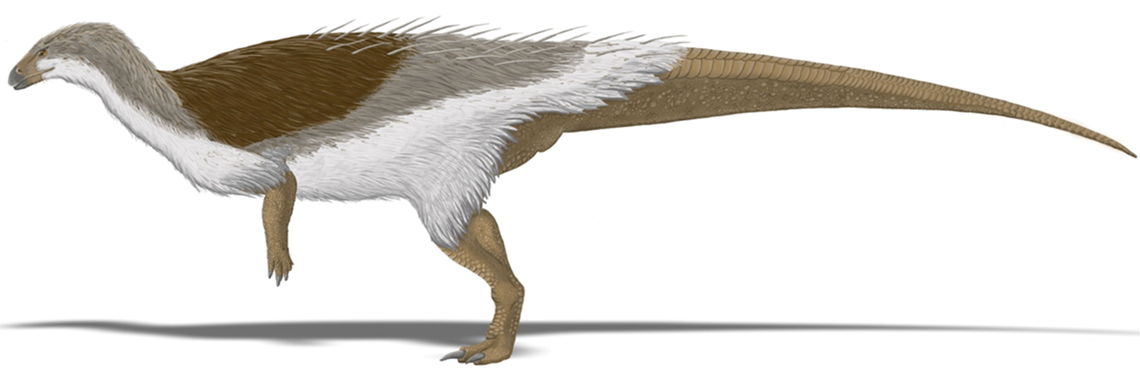
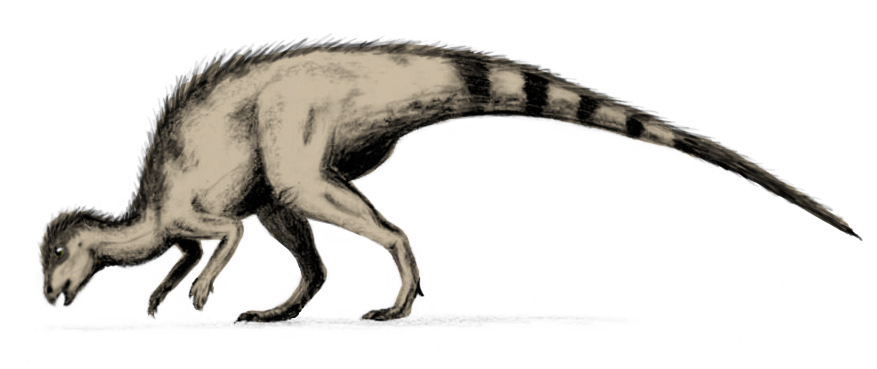
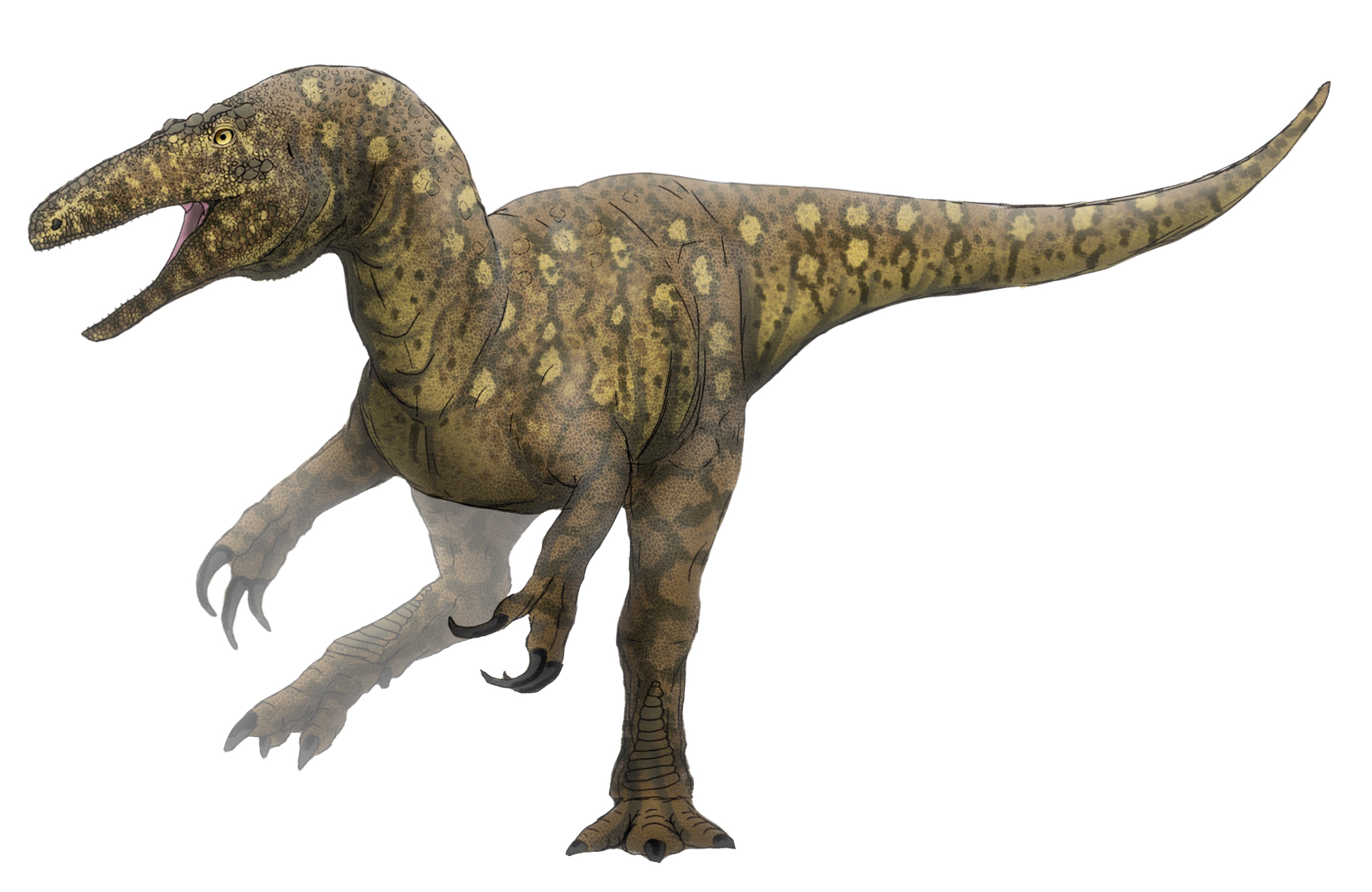
Dinosaur fossils recovered in the Kristianstad Basin include the remains of a leptoceratopsid similar to Leptoceratops (top-left), small ornithopods similar to Thescelosaurus (top-right) and Hypsilophodon (bottom-left) as well as a small theropod dinosaur, whose fragmentary remains were identified as from a non-avian theropod through comparisons with the Australian Australovenator (bottom-right).

Fossils of non-avian dinosaurs are exceptionally rare in Scandinavia, and the Kristianstad Basin is one of only two locations in Sweden where dinosaur fossils have been recovered. The only other site of known dinosaur fossils in Sweden is the Höganäs Formation, where they were first announced to be present by researchers in 2022. Though theropod teeth were reported from Ivö Klack by Per-Ove Persson in the 1950s, these have since been identified as fish teeth, probably from the genus Protosphyraena. Fossil material conclusively identified as dinosaurian was recovered only relatively recently, with the earliest discovery being two teeth from a small Ornithopod, similar to those of Hypsilophodon, being found at Ivö Klack in 2001. More comprehensive material referred to a leptoceratopsid ceratopsian ("Kristianasaura") was described in 2007 and further fragmentary fossils of other groups were recovered during excavations from 2010 to 2013. The local dinosaur fossils have mainly been researched by Johan Lindgren and paleontologist Jan Rees, alongside several colleagues.

The morphology of the teeth recovered from the leptoceratopsid roughly corresponds to Leptoceratops, but due to the great geographical distance and the lack of some ridges present in the teeth of Leptoceratops, it is likely that the Swedish leptoceratopsid represents a new taxon. Leptoceratopsid fossils include four maxillary teeth, a dentary tooth, two caudal vertebrae and one right manual phalanx, recovered at Åsen and Ullstorp. The discovery of the leptoceratopsid remains were scientifically significant as they represented the first record of ceratopsians in Europe and also contradicted the previously prevailing hypothesis that more primitive members of that group preferred semi-arid and arid environments rather far away from coastal regions.

Two left pedal phalanxes recovered at Åsen are probably attributable to two different small Ornithopod dinosaurs, with one of the phalanxes resembling the same bone in Thescelosaurus and the other resembling the same bone in Hypsilophodon. The first fossil of a carnivorous dinosaur in Sweden was discovered by high school student Clarence Lagerström in 2015 at the Ugnsmunnarna site on Ivö island. After comparisons with the same bone in the Australian megaraptoran Australovenator, the bone, an incomplete right tibia, could confidently be identified as coming from a small non-avian theropod dinosaur.

The dinosaur fossils recovered represent the remains of specimens transported out into the sea during floods or storms. Despite being fragmentary and few in number, they are scientifically important as they represent some of the few remains of the poorly known dinosaur fauna of the Baltic Shield, which was an isolated landmass during the Late Cretaceous. It is also possible that the recovered dinosaurs were not from the landmass itself, but from the rocky islands of the adjacent archipelago in the Kristianstad Basin itself.

The recovered dinosaurs all represent animals with lengths less than three meters (9 ft), but this does not necessarily mean that larger dinosaurs were absent; it is equally likely that only small animals were transported out into the sea where they could be fossilized and preserved. When large dinosaurs are excluded, the dinosaur fauna preserved in the Kristianstad Basin resembles that of Campanian–Maastrichtian dinosaur-bearing formations in Canada, which also include small ornithopods (such as Parksosaurus) and leptoceratopsids (such as Unescoceratops).

== Fossil content ==
=== Marine reptiles ===
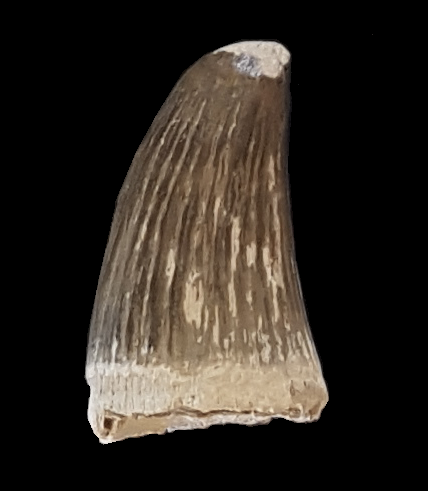
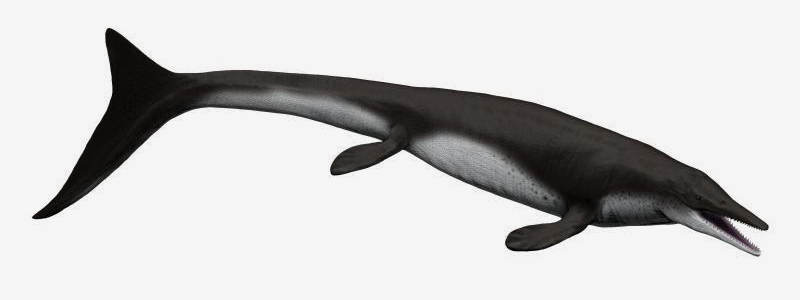
Fossil tooth of the giant mosasaur Tylosaurus from the Kristianstad Basin (left) and a reconstruction of Tylosaurus (right)

The warm shallow seas of the Kristianstad Basin were inhabited by a variety of marine reptiles, with several mosasaurs and plesiosaurs present. In addition to these extinct groups, turtle remains are abundant in the Kristianstad Basin, though only two taxa have been identified so far; an indeterminate trionychid (a freshwater softshell turtle) and a sea turtle. The sea turtle remains were initially referred to the genus Osteopygis, but it is now considered more likely that they represent the genus Euclastes.

The Swedish latest Early Campanian mosasaur fauna is one of the most taxon-rich assemblages of mosasaurs known, rivalled only by the Maastrichtian "Mosasaurus shales" fauna of southwestern Niger, the late Maastrichtian Maastricht Formation of the southern Netherlands, the early Maastrichtian Ciply Phosphatic Chalk fauna of southern Belgium and the contemporary Mooreville Chalk fauna of west-central Alabama. The mosasaurs were large, carnivorous reptiles at the top of the food chain and since all the Campanian species are known from several sites, it is likely that all of them lived in the entire basin. The high diversity of mosasaurs in the basin can be explained by the dissimilarity in dentition and body size between the species, meaning that they would not have competed with each other for food. The smallest and most common mosasaurs found are Clidastes and Eonatator, both of which reached lengths of 2–4 metres (6.6–13.1 ft). Among the larger Campanian mosasaurs are Selmasaurus, Hainosaurus, the 8-metre (26.2 ft) Prognathodon and the giant Tylosaurus, which surpassed 10 metres (32.8 ft) in length. Prognathodon and Tylosaurus were likely the local apex predators. After the latest early Campanian, the mosasaur fauna in the basin declined in diversity; going from the six genera present to just two by the middle late Campanian (Prognathodon and Plioplatecarpus) and two by the Maastrichtian (Mosasaurus and Plioplatecarpus), possibly the result of an intercontinental mosasaur extinction event.

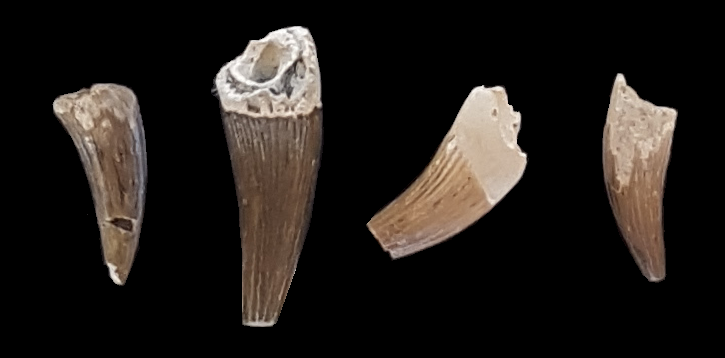
Fossil teeth of polycotylid plesiosaurs from the Kristianstad Basin

Plesiosaurs were represented by two groups in the Kristianstad Basin; long-necked elasmosaurids and short-necked polycotylids. The last comprehensive review of the plesiosaur fauna in the Kristianstad Basin was done by paleontologist Per-Ove Persson in the 1960s and his taxonomy is still used with caution, pending a much-needed new review. In particular, the elasmosaurid fossil material lacks important diagnostical features and might not be identifiable to the genus level. Elasmosaurids recognized as being present in the basin, per Persson's taxonomy, include two species of the large Elasmosaurus as well as one or two species of the local genus Scanisaurus, which measured around 4–5 metres in length (13.1–16.4 ft). The polycotylid fossils have not been identified down to the genus level, but they likely came from animals resembling the North American genus Dolichorhynchops. Because plesiosaurs are found in all the different environments believed to have existed in the Kristianstad Basin, they are thought to have been present in the entire basin.

=== Fish ===
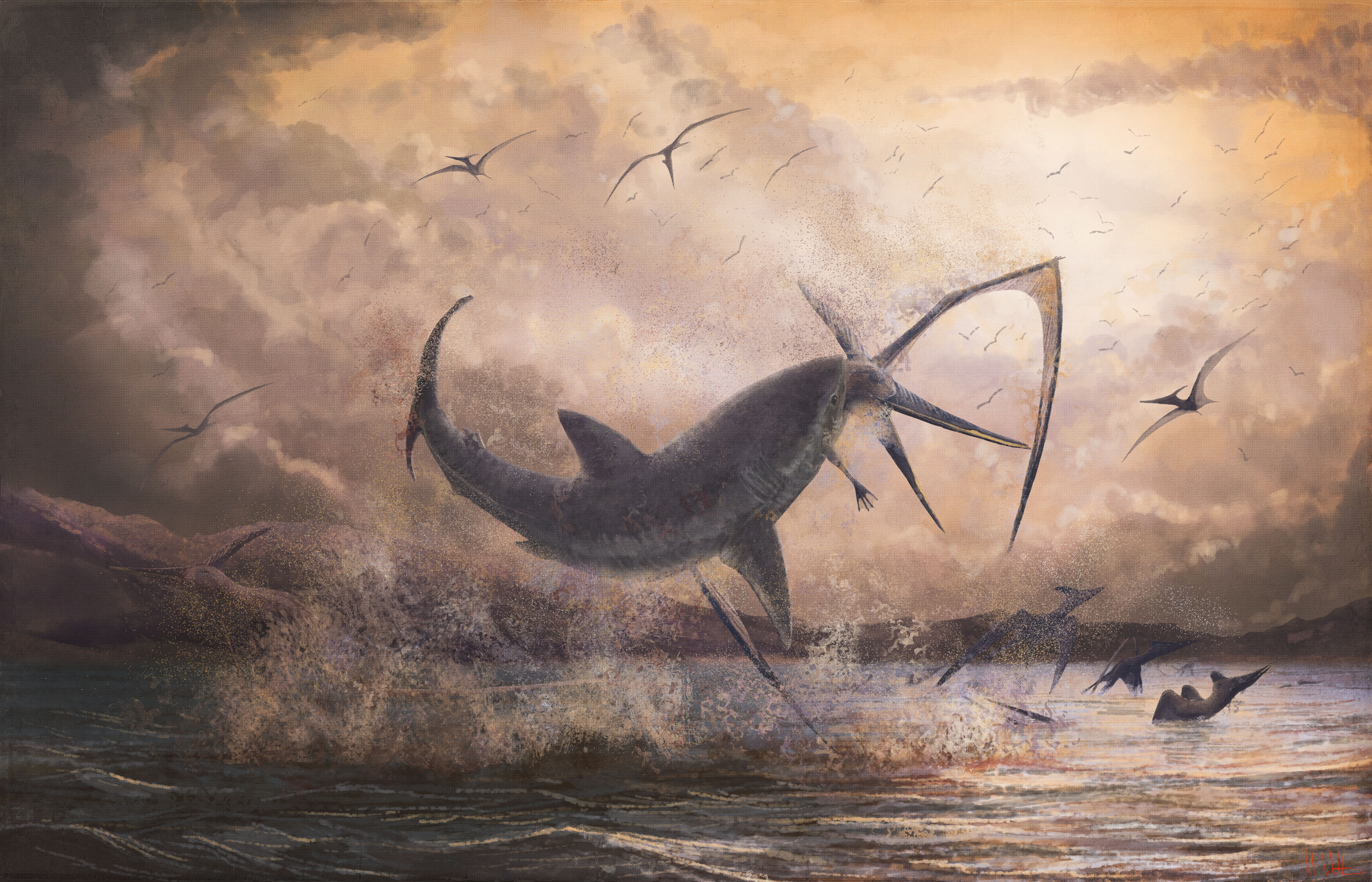
Reconstruction of the large shark Cretoxyrhina attacking a Pteranodon pterosaur. Fragmentary pterosaur fossils (though currently unpublished) have been found in earliest Campanian-age deposits at Ullstorp.

Teeth of cartilaginous fish, such as sharks, rays and chimaerids are relatively common fossil finds. In particular, the basin was home to a highly diverse shark fauna; the lamniform sharks present are the most diverse Late Cretaceous lamniform fauna yet discovered. Most of the sharks in the basin were lamniforms and were either nectonic (swimming freely in the body of water) or nectobenthic (active just above the sea floor). In addition to the lamniforms, other groups were present, including other galeomorphs, hybodonts and squalomorphs. Among the hybodonts were the genera Polyacrodus and Meristodon, which went extinct in the early Campanian, before the time when a majority of the local fossil fauna lived. Squalomorphs were represented by smaller squaliforms, hexanchiforms and angelsharks. Among the non-lamniform galeomorphs were bullhead sharks (such as Heterodontus), ground sharks, carpet sharks and synechodontiforms. All shark species found in the Kristianstad Basin were active predators, but many of them only fed on smaller food items such as bony fish and various invertebrates. Large nektonic lamniform sharks, such as Squalicorax and Cretoxyrhina, presumably occupied the top of the food web. The largest sharks presumably fed on most of the animals present in the basin, including sea turtles, smaller mosasaurs, plesiosaurs and other sharks. Bite marks from sharks are relatively common on reptile bones in the Kristianstad Basin. The overall most common genus of shark found is the lamniform Carcharias.

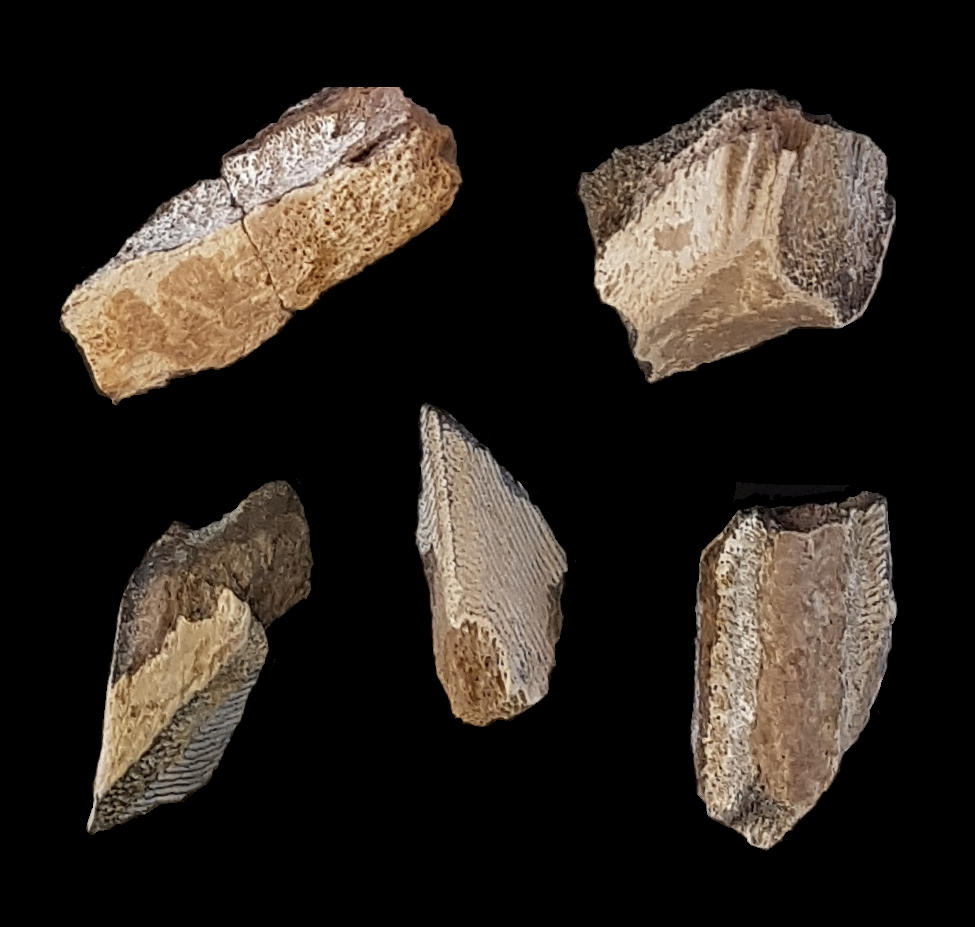
Fossil chimaerid dental parts found in the Kristianstad Basin

Fossil rays include guitarfish (Rhinobatos and Squatirhina), sawfish and rajiforms (Walteraja). The rajiforms, adapted to colder temperatures, were the most common rays during the late Campanian, whereas sawfish and guitarfish had been common during the early Campanian. Local chimaerids, adapted to eat hard-shelled organisms with their flattened and crushing dental plates, include the genera Amylodon, Edaphodon, Elasmodus and Ischyodus.

Several ray-finned fishes have also been identified based on numerous fossil vertebrae, teeth and scales. Local representatives included gars, teleosts, pycnodontiforms (such as Anomoeodus), elopiforms (such as Pachyrhizodus, similar to modern tuna) and pachycormiforms (such as Protosphyraena, similar to modern swordfish). The most common fish found is Enchodus, known for its long and thin teeth. With the exception of the pycnodontiforms, adapted to feed on shell-bearing organisms with their flat and crushing teeth, and Protosphyraena, able to feed on relatively large prey, the ray-finned fish found likely all fed on smaller fish.

=== Invertebrates ===
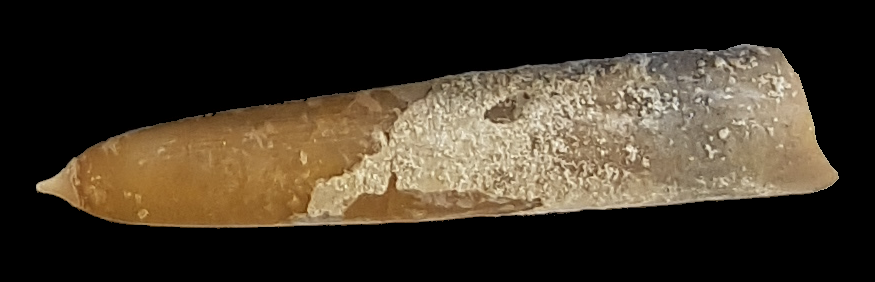
Fossil belemnite of the genus Gonioteuthis found in the Kristianstad Basin

The Kristianstad Basin preserves a rich invertebrate fauna. Latest early Campanian-age deposits at Ivö Klack alone have in addition to about 40 vertebrate species yielded more than 200 distinct species of invertebrates. Groups represented include cephalopods, bivalves, gastropods, brachiopods, echinoderms, corals, crustaceans, bryozoans and polychaetes. The most species-rich group by far is the bivalves, accounting for more than 70 of the 200 species at Ivö Klack. Common bivalves include various oysters, inoceramids, scallops (such as Pecten) and the genus Spondylus.

Gastropod fossils are very rare, probably on account of their shells being easily broken and thus failing to be preserved as fossils. Though found throughout the basin, gastropods are mainly known from Ivö Klack, where the 17 species identified represent one of the most diverse gastropod faunas found in an ancient rocky shore environment. Genera identified include, among others, Campanile, Nerita and Patella.

Brachiopods, superficially similar to bivalves, are represented by numerous genera, the most prominent being Crania, Magas, Rhynchonella and Terebratula. The local echinoderm fauna, which also included starfish and crinoids, was dominated by sea urchins, which occur in many different genera, the most common of which are Cidaris, Echinocorys, Echinogalerus, Holaster, Micraster, Phymosoma and Salenia. Cephalopods are represented by the abundant belemnites and the less common ammonites. Five genera of belemnites are recorded; Actinocamax, Belemnella, Belemnellocamax, Belemnitella and Gonioteuthis. Belemnites were a basic part of the food web and likely served as prey for many of the vertebrates in the basin, such as fish, plesiosaurs and the smaller mosasaurs. Crustaceans include both barnacles and decapods (the group that contains modern lobsters and crabs), represented by the genera Callianassa and Protocallianassa. Decapod fossils are primarily just the claws, as they are more easily preserved than other portions of the crustacean exoskeleton. Corals are primarily represented by the genera Leptophyllia, Micrabacia and Parasmilia. Polychate fossils are typically trace fossils; fossilized burrows and nests.

=== Terrestrial and amphibious life ===
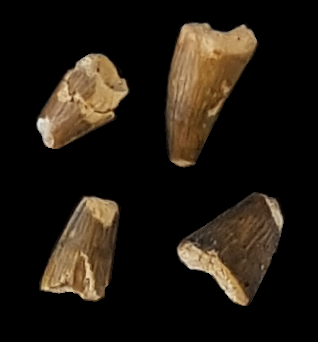
Teeth of the crocodylomorph Aigialosuchus found in the Kristianstad Basin

Fossil plants that grew in the coastal areas surrounding the basin and on the islands dotted throughout include conifers, deciduous trees, ferns and low-growing flowering plants. Fossil wood has been recovered from late Middle Santonian to earliest Campanian-age deposits at Åsen, representing the tree genera Pinus, Platanus, Scandianthus, Silvianthemum and Actinocalyx.

In addition to the aforementioned dinosaurs and the freshwater turtle, further land-dwelling and amphibious animals have also been discovered in the basin. The basin preserves the fossils of the crocodylomorph Aigialosuchus, which lived alongside the coastlines of the mainland and the small islands. The jaws of Aigialosuchus are long and thin, suggesting a diet mostly composed of fish, but its teeth are unusually robust, meaning that it might also have fed on shelled invertebrates or larger animals. Fossils of small scincomorph lizards, similar to Araeosaurus, have also been discovered. Fossils of amphibious birds, hesperornithiforms, have also been found, representing the two genera Baptornis and Hesperornis.

== Depositional environment ==
During the transgressions experienced during the Late Cretaceous, the inland sea within the Kristianstad Basin remained very shallow, and its northern parts formed an archipelago with several low islands and a number of small peninsulas. Remnants of these islands and peninsulas remain today in the form of rocky hills and mounts throughout northeastern Skåne, such as the Ivö Klack site, Fjälkinge backe, Kjugekull, Oppmannaberget, Vångaberget, Västanåberget and Ryssberget. The climate was subtropical to temperate and local plant life included low-growing flowering plants, ferns, conifers and deciduous trees.

Most of the area preserved in the Kristianstad Basin was a shallow marine inner shelf environment, as indicated by the present invertebrate fauna (which has been compared to modern faunas). Most of the water was probably less than 40 meters (131 ft) deep, but there were a wide range of environments present. These environments included rocky and sandy beach areas, drowned river valleys and neritic and deeper offshore environments. There were also shallow and protected coastal bays as well as coastal waters that were significantly deeper. Some structures within the rocks of the Basin, combined with the often fragmented and broken condition of the fossils recovered, indicate that the Cretaceous environment was a high-energy environment, where the water was fast-moving and agitated, created by waves and currents.

=== Paleoecology of Ivö Klack and Åsen ===
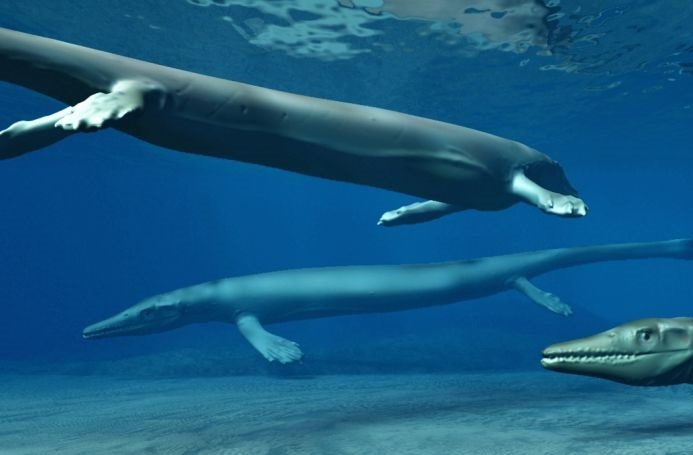
Reconstruction of three Clidastes mosasaurs in shallow water. Young Clidastes have been found at Åsen, likely using the shallow and murky water there as protection against larger predators.

Ivö Klack was a small island during the Campanian. Teeth from large lamniform sharks, such as Cretoxyrhina and Cretalamna, are significantly more common at Ivö Klack than they are in other sites, such as Ignaberga. The prominence of large sharks in the area probably derives from large sharks requiring large prey, and large marine reptiles being common at Ivö Klack as well. There are plesiosaur fossils from Ivö Klack with shark bite marks. Modern great white sharks are known to patrol around small islands inhabited by seals, possibly a behavior also present in the similar Cretoxyrhina.

Fossil remains of large marine reptiles are also especially common at Ivö Klack. The high diversity of sharks and mosasaurs recovered at Ivö Klack shows that large predators frequented the rocky coastline. There must have been a productive ecosystem, with a diverse invertebrate fauna attracting small nektonic predators (such as cephalopods and fish), which then in turn attracted larger predators. It is probable that the richness of the environment also made Ivö Klack a nursery and feeding ground for migratory species, similar to rocky shores today. The discovery of the basin's only crocodylomorph at Ivö Klack might indicate that Aigialosuchus preferred to live in coastal waters, where it could lay its egg on adjacent land, rest and heat up, similar to modern crocodilians.

The Åsen site is believed to have been a murky river mouth during the Campanian. Teeth and vertebrae of small-sized (probably juvenile) Clidastes mosasaurs have been found at Åsen, which suggests that the area offered some protection against predation by larger mosasaurs and other predators, possibly due to the murky waters produced by some nearby river system. This murky setting also seems to have been preferred by the many species of benthic sharks and rays recovered at Åsen. Particularly, rays are significantly more common at Åsen than elsewhere. It is probable that they preferred the murky and estuarine environment there, similar to the environments preferred by their modern relatives. The sharks and rays at Åsen probably fed on fish and invertebrates, which occur with less diversity (though still large numbers) at Åsen than elsewhere. They might have primarily fed on soft-bodied invertebrates, less likely to be preserved in the fossil record.

== See also ==
- List of fossil sites
- Geology of Sweden
- Lists of dinosaur-bearing stratigraphic units
- List of stratigraphic units with indeterminate dinosaur fossils
- List of mosasaur-bearing stratigraphic units
- List of fossiliferous stratigraphic units in Sweden
