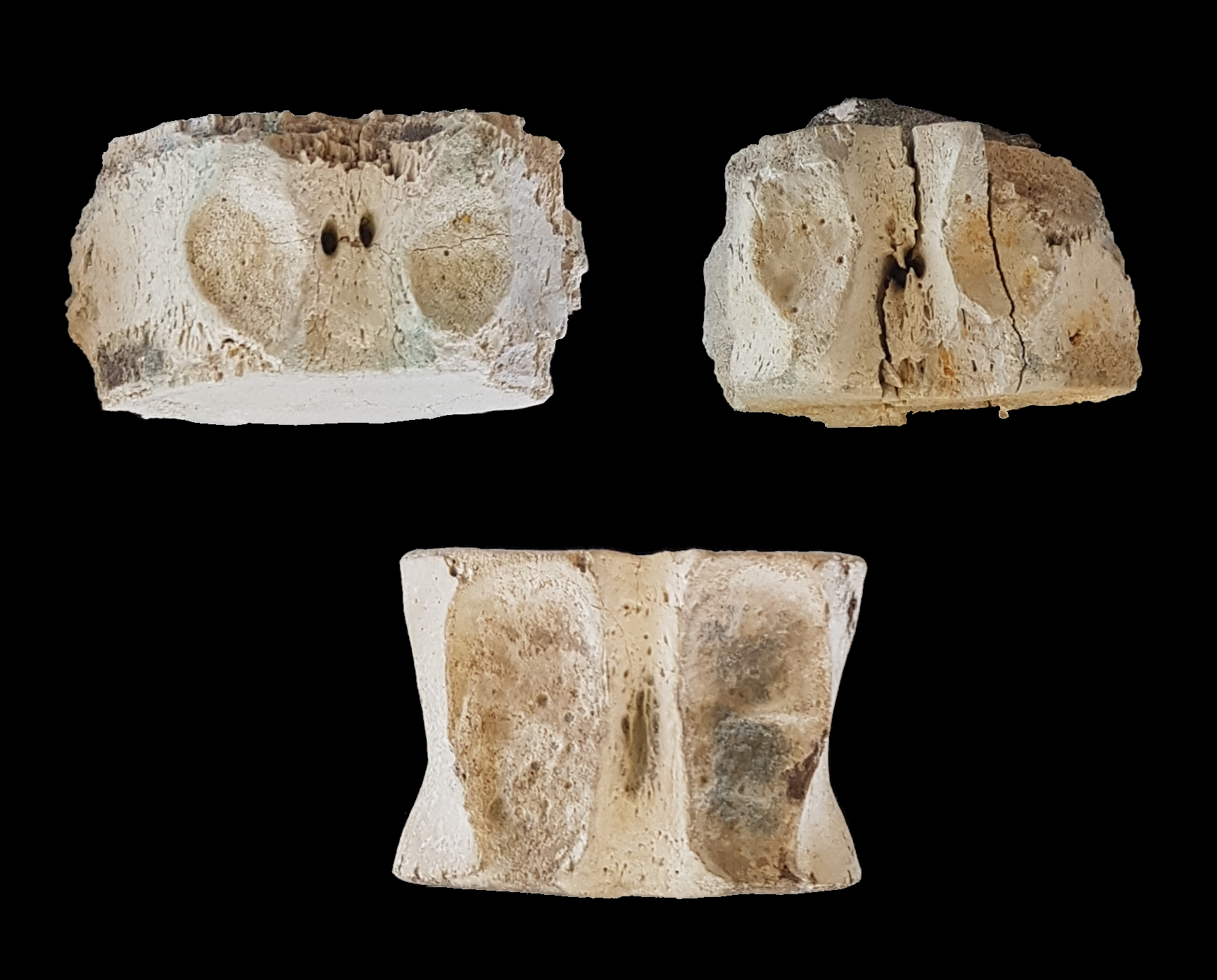
- Neck (top) and lower back (bottom) vertebrae referred to Scanisaurus sp., excavated in the Kristianstad Basin

Scientific classification
- Kingdom: Animalia
- Phylum: Chordata
- Class: Reptilia
- Superorder: †Sauropterygia
- Order: †Plesiosauria
- Superfamily: †Plesiosauroidea
- Family: †Elasmosauridae
- Genus: †Scanisaurus; Persson, 1959
- Species: †S. nazarowi

Binomial name
- †Scanisaurus nazarowi (Bogolyubov, 1911)

Synonyms
- Cimoliasaurus nazarowi Bogolyubov, 1911

= Scanisaurus =

Scanisaurus Temporal range: Campanian 80.5–75 Ma

Extinct genus of reptiles

Scanisaurus is a dubious genus of plesiosaur that lived in what is now Sweden and Russia during the Campanian stage of the Late Cretaceous period. The name Scanisaurus means "Skåne lizard", Skåne being the southernmost province of Sweden, where a majority of the fossils referred to the genus have been recovered. The genus contains one species, S. nazarowi, described in 1911 by Nikolay Bogolyubov as a species of Cimoliasaurus based on a single vertebral centrum discovered near Orenburg, Russia. the species was moved into its own genus by Per-Ove Persson in 1959 after several differences were observed between the Russian centra and new fossils from Skåne and the type species of Cimoliasaurus. Due to the limited type material and the lack of diagnostic features in the Swedish fossils confidently separating Scanisaurus from other Late Cretaceous elasmosaurids, the genus is of questionable validity, though it continues to be used in practice.

Scanisaurus fossils have mainly been found in the Kristianstad Basin in northeastern Skåne, where they represent the most common plesiosaur fossils. Scanisaurus shared its environment with a diverse marine fauna, including many other marine reptiles. It would have been a middle trophic-level predator, about 4–5 meters (13–16 ft) in length, and would have been able to feed both in open water and on the sea floor, likely feeding mainly on small prey such as small fish or belemnites. A fountain bearing the name of the animal and featuring two sculptures depicting it was erected in the Swedish town of Bromölla in 1971.

== History of research ==
In 1911, Russian paleontologist Nikolay Bogolyubov described a Late Cretaceous posterior cervical (neck) vertebral centrum discovered near Orenburg, Russia. Bogolyubov referred the centrum to the plesiosaur genus Cimoliasaurus and believed it to represent a new species, which he named C. nazarowi. Bogolyubov compared the centrum with those of other plesiosaurs and found it to be most similar to a vertebra referred to Cimoliasaurus sp. from the Cenomanian Quiriquina Formation of Quiriquina Island, Chile and to vertebrae referred to Cimoliasaurus magnus, the type species of Cimoliasaurus. The main distinguishing feature used by Bogolyubov to justify the creation of a new species was that his centrum was wider than other centra referred to Cimoliasaurus.

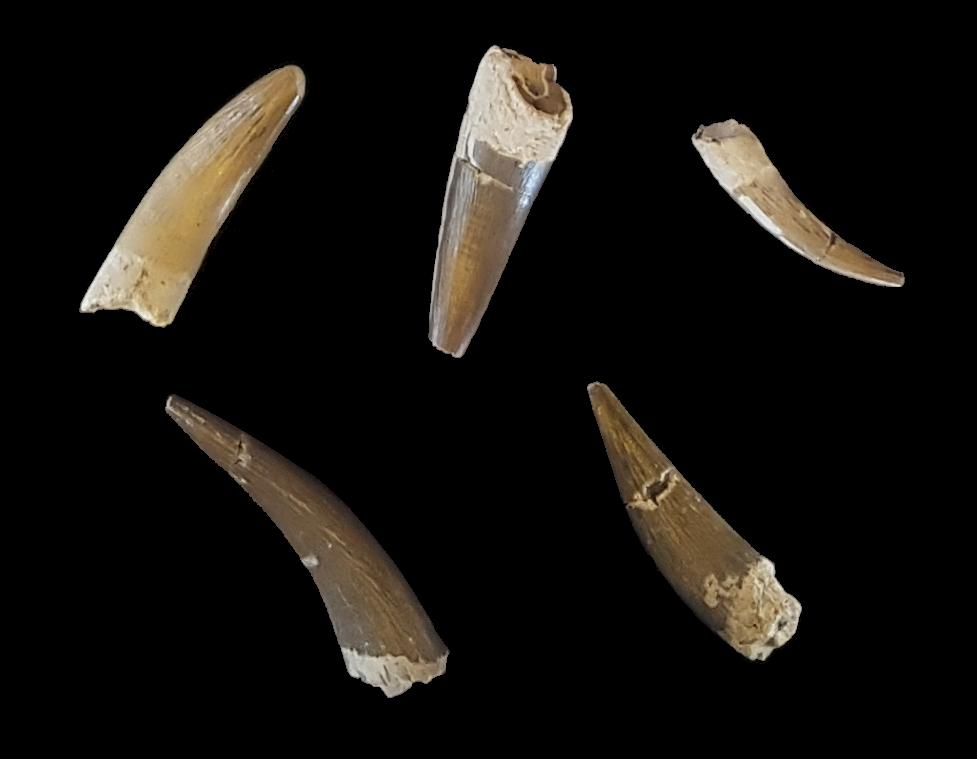
Teeth referred to Scanisaurus sp., excavated in the Kristianstad Basin

In 1959, Swedish paleontologist Per-Ove Persson examined the fragmentary plesiosaur fossil record of Late Cretaceous Skåne in southern Sweden, primarily recovered from fossil sites within the Kristianstad Basin (many from the island of Ivö) and from south-western Skåne. He found that cervical vertebral centra from Skåne accorded so well with the vertebra described by Bogolyubov that they "must belong to one and the same genus". Furthermore, Persson noted several differences between Bogolyubov's centrum and the Swedish material and the fossils of C. magnus, and considered C. nazarowi distinct enough to warrant being placed in a separate genus. Persson named this new genus Scanisaurus, meaning "Skåne lizard". Persson noted that S. nazarowi remained an "undefinable" species since it remains based on only a single vertebral centrum, but felt confident that the Swedish material was referrable to the species since it did not differ in any essential points from Bogolyubov's fossil. Persson noted that the Swedish fossils were the same species "with a fairly great degree of probability" and provisionally designated them as S. cf. nazarowi.

There were three principal characteristics Persson perceived to differentiate Scanisaurus from Cimoliasaurus. First, in Cimoliasaurus, the ribs were fused to the vertebrae with at least the pre-pectoral centra, whilst in Scanisaurus the cervical ribs were fused to the centra by only the sutures. Second, the length of the posterior cervical centra decreased towards the head in Cimoliasaurus, while the opposite was true in Scanisaurus. Third, the cervical centra of Scanisaurus were broader proportional to their length than the corresponding centra of Cimoliasaurus.

Because centra referred to S. cf. nazarowi were far more common in the Swedish fossil sites compared to centra from other plesiosaurs, Persson concluded that S. cf. nazarowi was "obviously the most common plesiosaurian" in Late Cretaceous Skåne. With this in mind, he also referred the most common type of plesiosaur teeth found, some of which had been found in association with S. cf. nazarowi vertebrae, to the species as well, alongside associated ossifications of humeri and femora.

In 1995, in an examination of material referred to the invalid species Plesiosaurus houzeaui (found in Belgium), French paleontologist Nathalie Bardet and Belgian paleontologist Pascal Godefroit discussed other questionable plesiosaur species from Europe. Bardet and Godefroit noted that though Persson had referred the Swedish material to several different elasmosaurid genera, including Scanisaurus and Elasmosaurus, the fossils only possessed the necessary characteristics to be referred to the Elasmosauridae, not a particular genus or species. Though the material referred to S. cf. nazarowi, consisting of vertebrae, teeth and limb bones, was more complete than the material referred to Elasmosaurus, it was deemed to lack any diagnostic features with which it could be differentiated from other Late Cretaceous elasmosaurids. Though Scanisaurus for this reason is typically no longer considered a valid taxon (constituting a nomen dubium), the name continues to be used in practice.

In 1996, Persson provisionally referred a crushed reptile skull recovered from Ignaberga quarry in the Kristianstad Basin to Scanisaurus sp., since two tooth fragments associated with the fossil showed the same striation pattern as in the teeth referred to S. cf. nazrowi. Though the skull is too crushed to give much useful anatomical information, it is the only cranial fossil referred to Scanisaurus (with the exception of teeth) and demonstrates that its head was comparatively larger than the heads of other dolichodiran plesiosaurs.

== Description ==
Size compared to a human

Scanisaurus was a "dolichodiran" (i.e. long-necked) plesiosaur, albeit one with a neck relatively shorter than those of some of its relatives (such as Elasmosaurus). It has sometimes been described as a "mesodiran" plesiosaur, with a larger head and shorter neck relative to other dolichodiran genera. It was likely similar to other relatively short-necked elasmosaurids, such as Cimoliasaurus and the genera in the subfamily Aristonectinae. Based on the size of its fossils and comparisons with the proportions of other plesiosaurs, Scanisaurus probably reached 4–5 meters (13–16 ft) in length.

== Classification ==
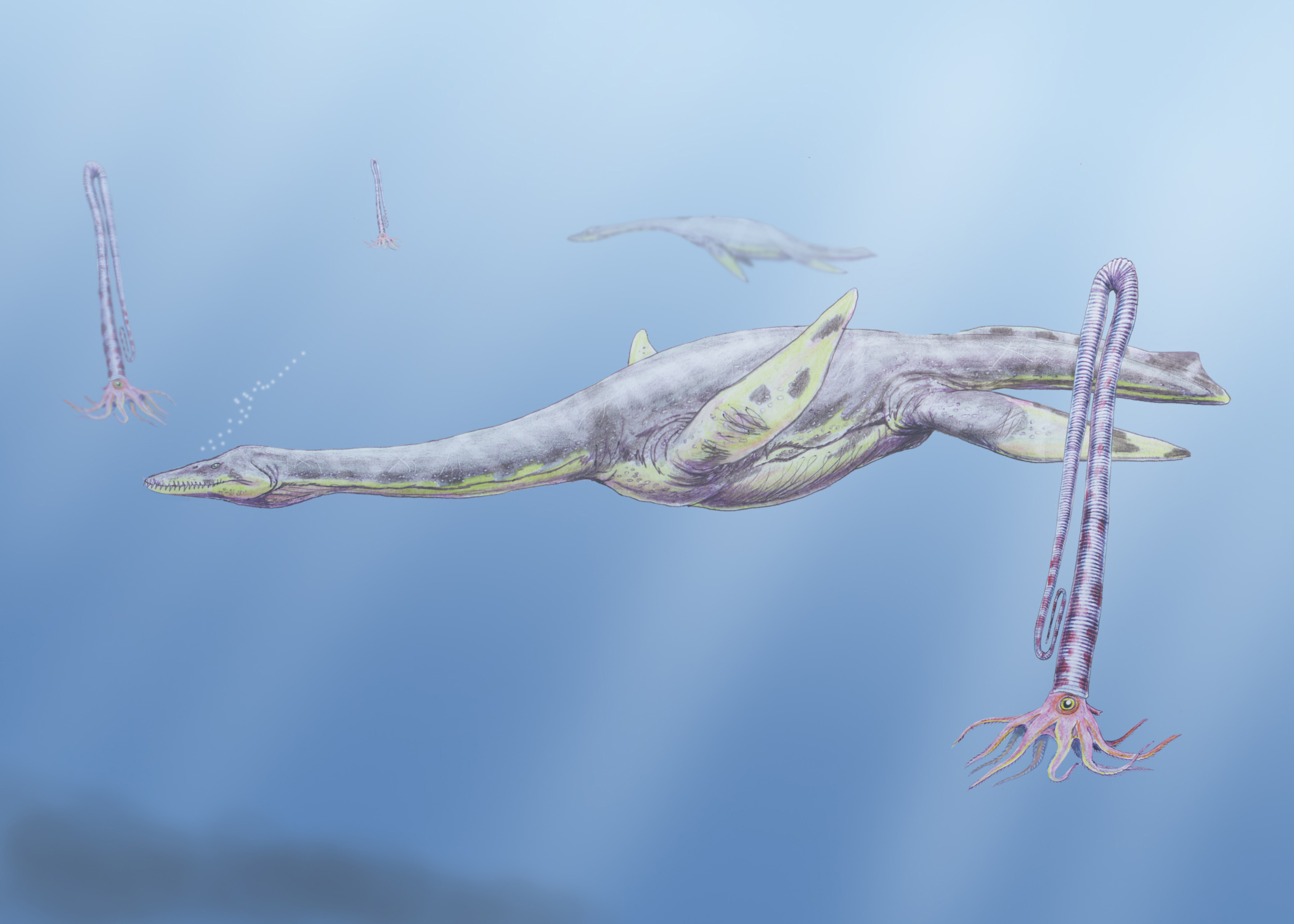
Scanisaurus was probably similar (and maybe closely related) to other short-necked elasmosaurids, such as Aristonectes (pictured)

Persson wrote that most of the known characteristics Scanisaurus agreed well with the characteristics of the Elasmosauridae. However, Persson did not consider the genus to represent a typical elasmosaurid and noted that it differed in one essential feature; the cervical centra of Scanisaurus were shorter and broader than those of other elasmosaurids. With this in mind, Persson suggested that Scanisaurus could be a representative of a new family of Late Cretaceous plesiosaurs, possibly a group intermediate between pliosaurs such as the polycotylids and elasmosaurids. Because Scanisaurus was far more similar to elasmosaurids than it was to polycotylids, Persson provisionally referred the genus to the Elasmosauridae.

In 1960, Persson referred both Cimoliasaurus and Scanisaurus to a new family of mesodiran plesiosaurs, which he dubbed the Cimoliasauridae. In 1963, Persson also referred Aristonectes to the Cimoliasauridae on account of perceived close resemblances with fossil material of Cimoliasaurus and Scanisaurus in the length-width ratio of the cervical centra. Cimoliasauridae was placed as the sister group to Polycotylidae, but a 2009 revision of the type fossils of Cimoliasaurus by American paleontologist F. Robin O'Keefe and Canadian paleontologist Hallie P. Street showed that Cimoliasaurus belonged to the Elasmosauridae, making the Cimoliasauridae synonymous with the Elasmosauridae. A 2011 re-examination of the cervical vertebrae referred to Scanisaurus by Swiss paleontologist Christian Foth and German paleontologists Johannes Kalbe and René Kautz suggested that Scanisaurus being placed in the Elasmosauridae was plausible. The well-defined ossified articular margins and binocular-shaped articular faces of the centra, combined with their relatively short length, are features shared between Scanisaurus and other elasmosaurids. Modern research thus tends to place Scanisaurus in the Elasmosauridae, though its precise position within the family is uncertain.

== Paleobiology ==
A 2017 study by Swedish paleontologists Benjamin P. Kear, Dennis Larsson and Johan Lindgren and Slovak paleontologist Martin Kundrát interpreted Scanisaurus as a middle trophic-level predator that would have been able to feed both in open water and on the sea floor. Kear and colleagues drew this conclusion from the fact that elasmosaurid teeth were both structurally fragile and took more time to replace than the teeth of other reptiles, meaning that elasmosaurids such as Scanisaurus would probably have kept to easily subdued prey to minimize the potential for damage, making them ecologically optimized towards middle trophic level aquatic predation. The sharp and elongated teeth of Scanisaurus indicates that they were used to smash or pierce smaller prey such as small fish or belemnites. Stomach content from other plesiosaurs has revealed a wide variety of prey, including bottom-dwelling invertebrates (i.e. gastropods and bivalves), fish, pterosaurs and ammonites.

== Paleoecology ==
Most of the fossils referred to Scanisaurus cf. nazarowi have been recovered from fossil sites within the Kristianstad Basin, where, according to Persson, S. cf. nazarowi fossils represent the most common plesiosaur fossils found. During the Campanian, the Kristianstad Basin was a subtropical to temperate shallow inland sea home to a diverse marine fauna characteristic of shallow marine life of an inner shelf community and included abundant algae, brachiopods, bryozoans, molluscs (including bivalves, gastropods, belemnites and the ammonites), sea urchins, serpulids, decapods and sponges. Additionally, fish (including a vast array of sharks) were also common and fossils of many species of reptiles, most of them marine, have also been found, including mosasaurs, sea turtles, crocodylomorphs and a few dinosaurs. There were also three to five other plesiosaur species (two species historically attributed to Elasmosaurus, one or two polycotylids and potentially another species of Scanisaurus, represented by the 1996 skull and isolated teeth). Mosasaur bite marks have been found on plesiosaur bones recovered from the basin.

== In popular culture ==
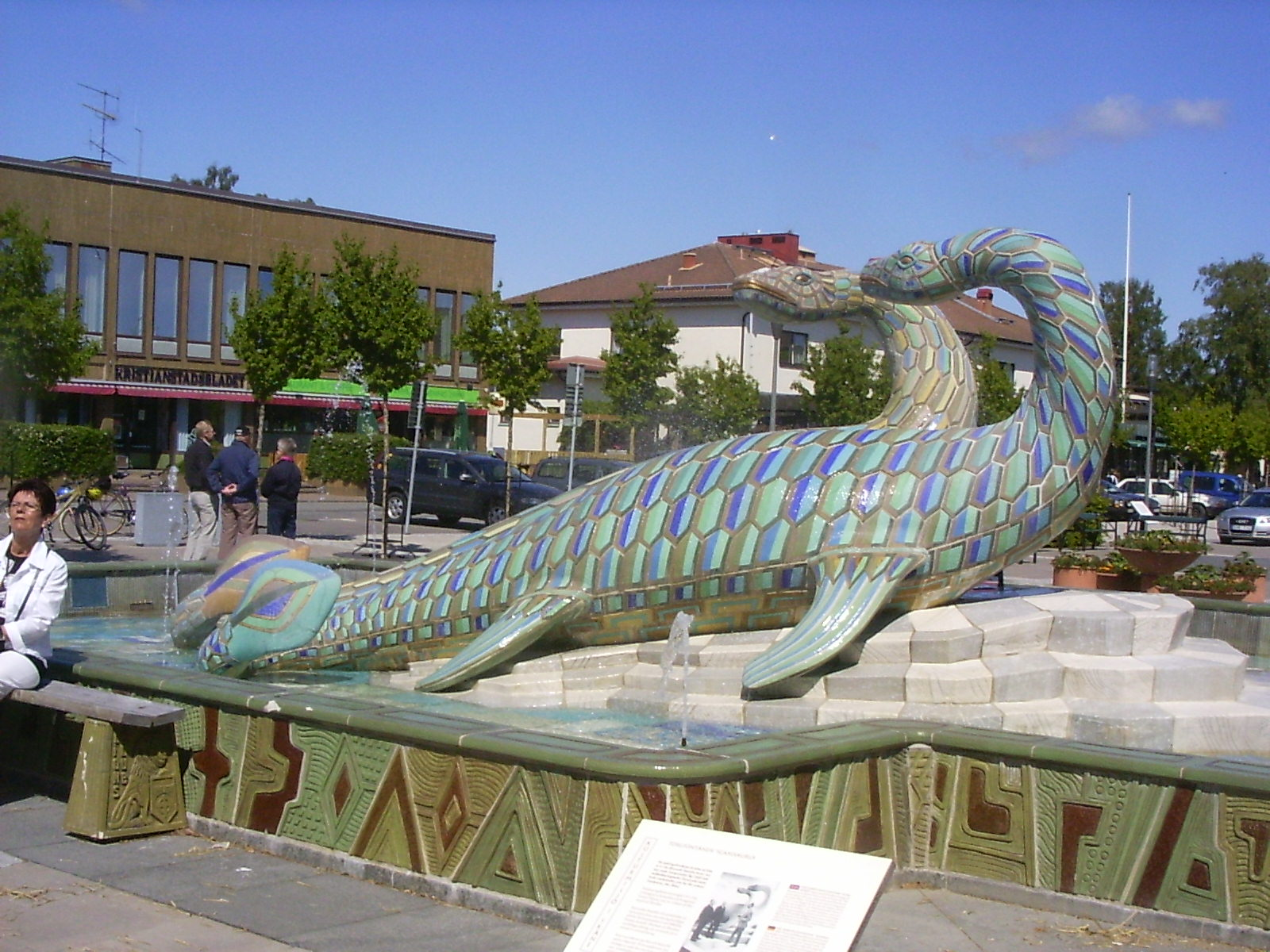
The Scanisaurus fountain in Bromölla, Sweden

A fountain by the name Scanisaurus was constructed in Bromölla, a town close to Ivö, by artist Gunnar Nylund in 1971. The fountain depicts two plesiosaurs, one male and one female, sunbathing on a rock on the ancient Ivö island. The sculptures are made of around 3000 parts of shaped ceramics on bodies made of reinforced concrete. Locally in Sweden, plesiosaurs and Scanisaurus in particular are often referred to as "svanödlor" ("swan lizards") or "svanhalsödlor" ("swan-neck lizards").

== See also ==
- List of plesiosaur genera
- Timeline of plesiosaur research
