= Ivetofta =

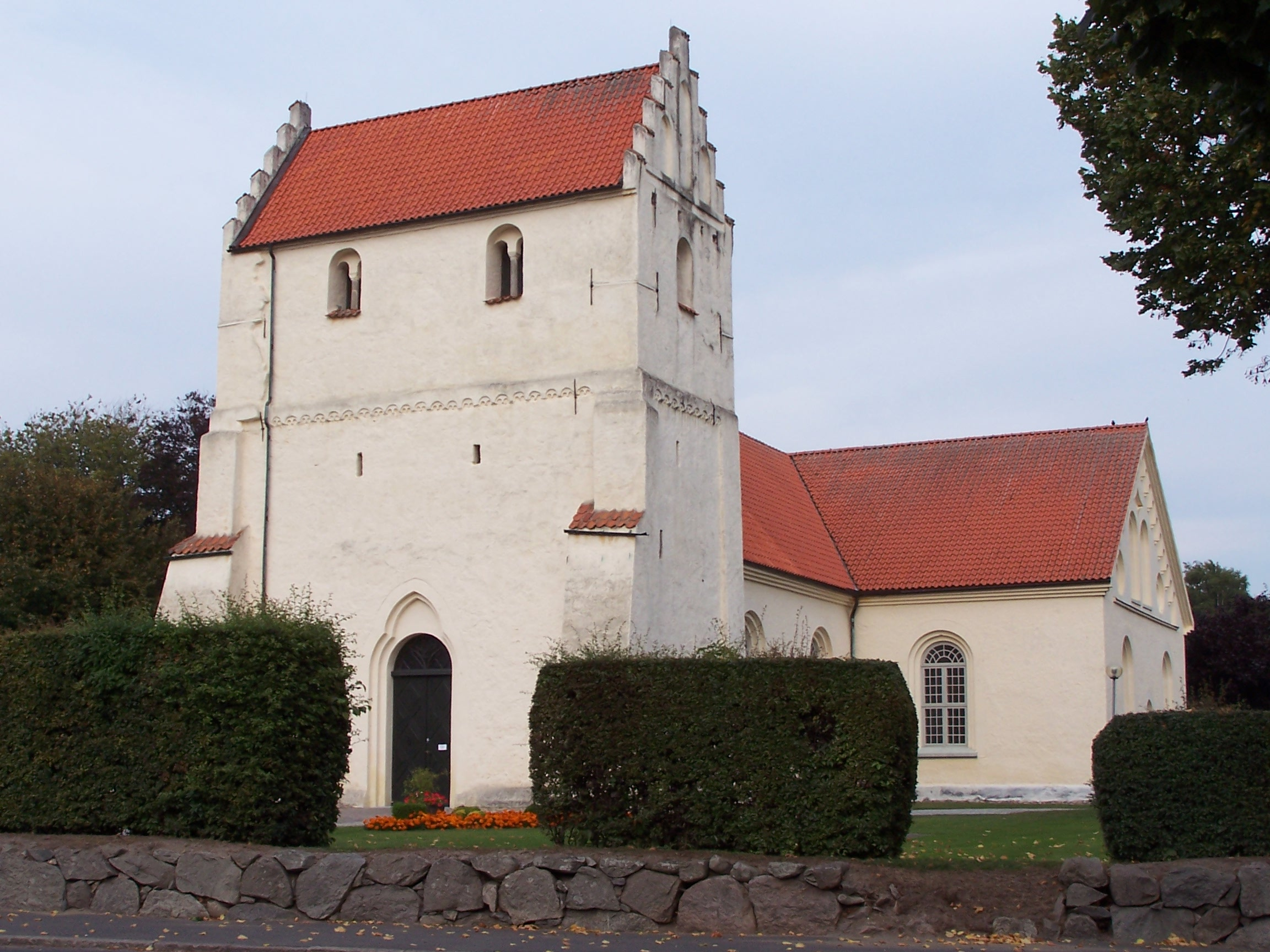
- Ivetofta Church

- Location in Skåne County Ivetofta (Skåne)
- Coordinates: 56°5′11″N 14°28′35″E
- Country: Sweden
- Province: Skåne
- County: Sweden
- Municipality: Bromölla Municipality
- Time zone: UTC+1 (CET)
  - Summer (DST): UTC+2 (CEST)

Ivetofta is a village and a suburb of Bromölla, in Skåne County in southern Sweden. With a history going back to the 12th century, it was once a rural municipality in the former Kristianstad County. It lies on the eastern bank of Ivö Lake, between Ivö and the smaller lake Levrasjön. The Ivetofta Local Historical Society was founded in 1981 and as of 2013 has nearly 500 members.

== Geography ==
The village is located between Ivösjön and Hanöbukten, and consists of the forested Ryssberget hill and sandy plains which are cultivated. The habitats are characterised as pine forest, deciduous forest, meadow, pasture, and grassy heath.

== History ==
The name is first documented in 1319 as Ywätoffte. It stems from the old name Ivösjön, the Ivö Lake, and "toft" meaning farm. Bromölla, of which Ivetofta is a suburb, came to be established initially as a borough when limestone was found nearby, and later became a municipality. The origin of its name is attributed to a mill named Bromölla which existed on the bank of the Skräbe River and is dated to the 1460s. A ceramic vessel discovered at Ivetofta attests to pre-historic hunter-gatherers who pre-dated farming here. Palaeontological finds include Plesiosaurian bone fragments which were provided to the Palaeontological Institute of Lund in 1961 from a borehole, while archaeology has uncovered cremation urns from pits estimated as Late Bronze Age.

== Landmarks ==
Ivetofta Church was probably built in the 12th century; the tower (built in stone and decorated with carved sandstone) on the western side was added in the 13th century. The altar, pulpit, pews and the baptismal font were donated by Sophia Brahe in the early 17th century, who had moved to the area with her second husband and was known for her work in Danish genealogy. These features have been retained in the renovated church. Brahe had planned on being buried there but returned to her native Denmark, settling in Helsingør before she died. Her planned headstone is on display at Ivetofta church.

Major extensions were completed in the 1850s in order to accommodate a growing population in the town. The old nave and chancel were demolished, and a wider church room with cross arms and a three sided chancel were built by the architect C.G. Brunius. The nave was extended to form two arms of the cross. Major external renovation work was carried out in 2012, which retained features added by Brahe. The porch has the flooring that was removed from the coal cellar of the old church.

Arup Manor, a small estate in the parish of Ivetofta, was the home of Sophia Brahe from 1618, when she was widowed. The main building has a tower and two wings. The building was extended in 1796 under the ownership of Ulrika Sparre. A pulp mill was opened in Ivetofta in the 1960s.

Tiansgården, an 18th-century thatched farmhouse, houses the local history museum with artifacts from the 19th century to the present day. The Ivetofta Folklore Society, established in 1981, operating from Mill Houses and Tian farm, runs the museum and carries out research.

== Notable residents ==
- Sophia Brahe (1556–1643), scientist and genealogist
- Jimmie Åkesson (born 1979), politician
- Bengt Ankarloo (1935-2008), historian
