= Nymölla =

- Location within Skåne Location within Sweden
- Coordinates: 56°02′30″N 14°28′00″E
- Country: Sweden
- Province: Skåne
- County: Skåne County
- Municipality: Bromölla Municipality

Area
  - Total: 1.15 km^{2} (0.44 sq mi)

Population (31 December 2010)
  - Total: 272
  - Density: 237/km^{2} (610/sq mi)
- Time zone: UTC+1 (CET)
  - Summer (DST): UTC+2 (CEST)

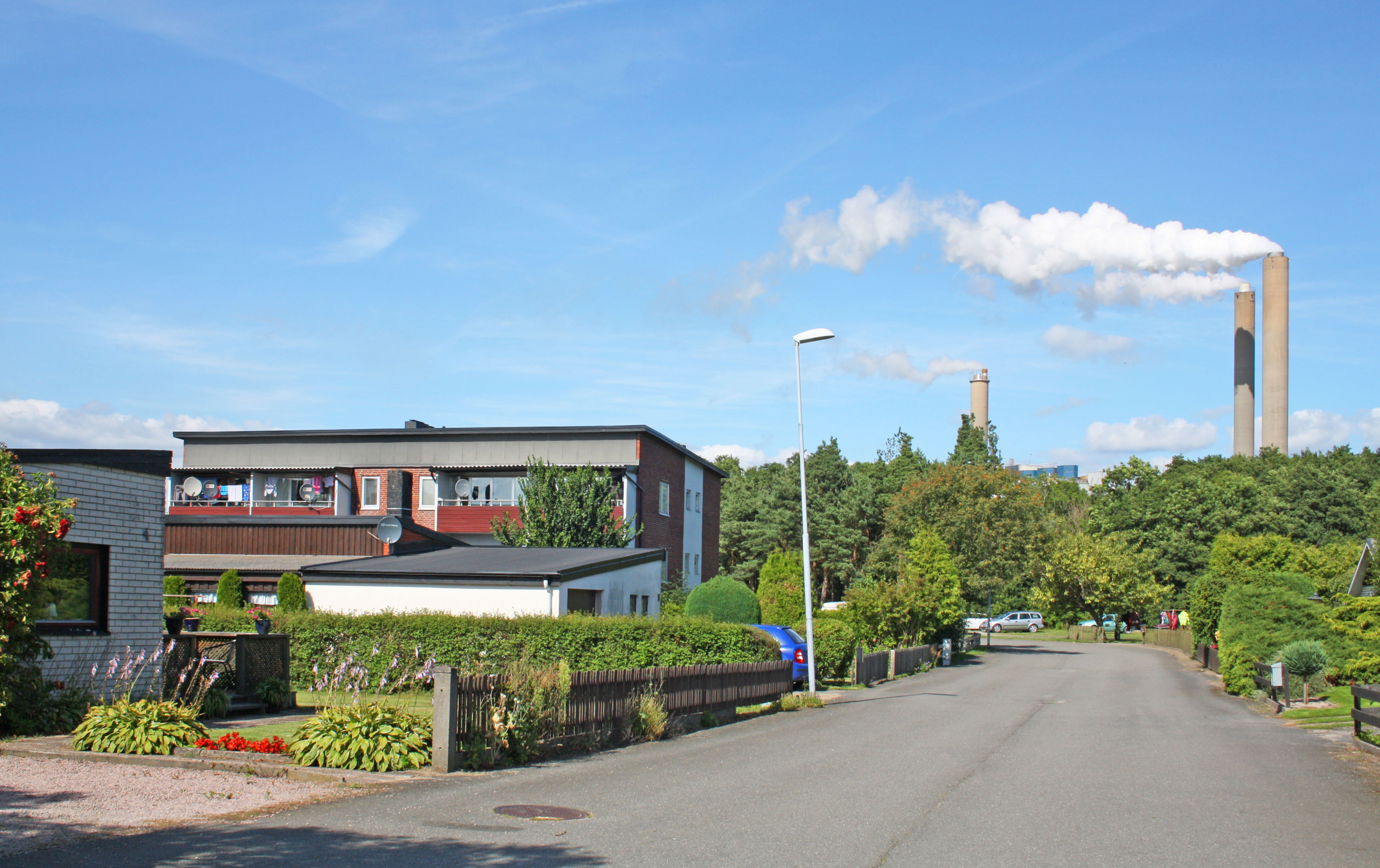

Nymölla is a locality situated in Bromölla Municipality, Skåne County, Sweden with 272 inhabitants in 2010.
