= Roche moutonnée =

Rock formation created by the passing of a glacier

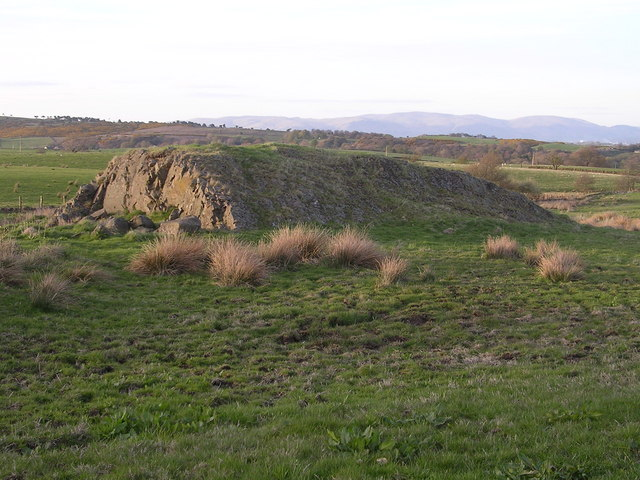
Roche moutonnée near Myot Hill, Scotland

In glaciology, a roche moutonnée (or sheepback) is a rock formation created by the passing of a glacier. The passage of glacial ice over underlying bedrock often results in asymmetric erosional forms as a result of abrasion on the "stoss" (upstream) side of the rock, and plucking (i.e. pieces cracked off) on the "lee" (downstream) side. Some geologists limit the term to features on scales of a metre to several hundred metres and refer to larger features as crag and tail, though they are formed in essentially the same way.

== Etymology ==
The 18th-century Alpine explorer Horace-Bénédict de Saussure coined the term roches moutonnées in 1786. He saw in these rocks a resemblance to the wigs that were fashionable amongst French gentry in his era and which were smoothed over with mutton fat (hence moutonnée) so as to keep the hair in place. The French term is often incorrectly interpreted as "sheep rock".

== Description ==
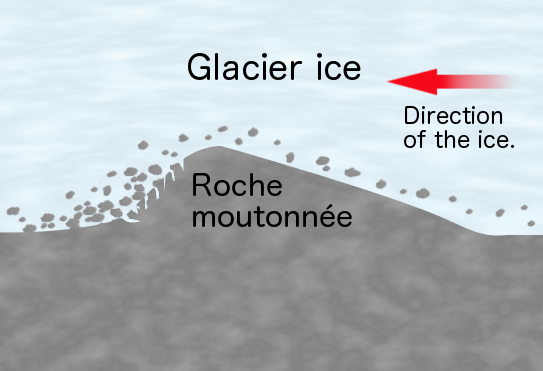

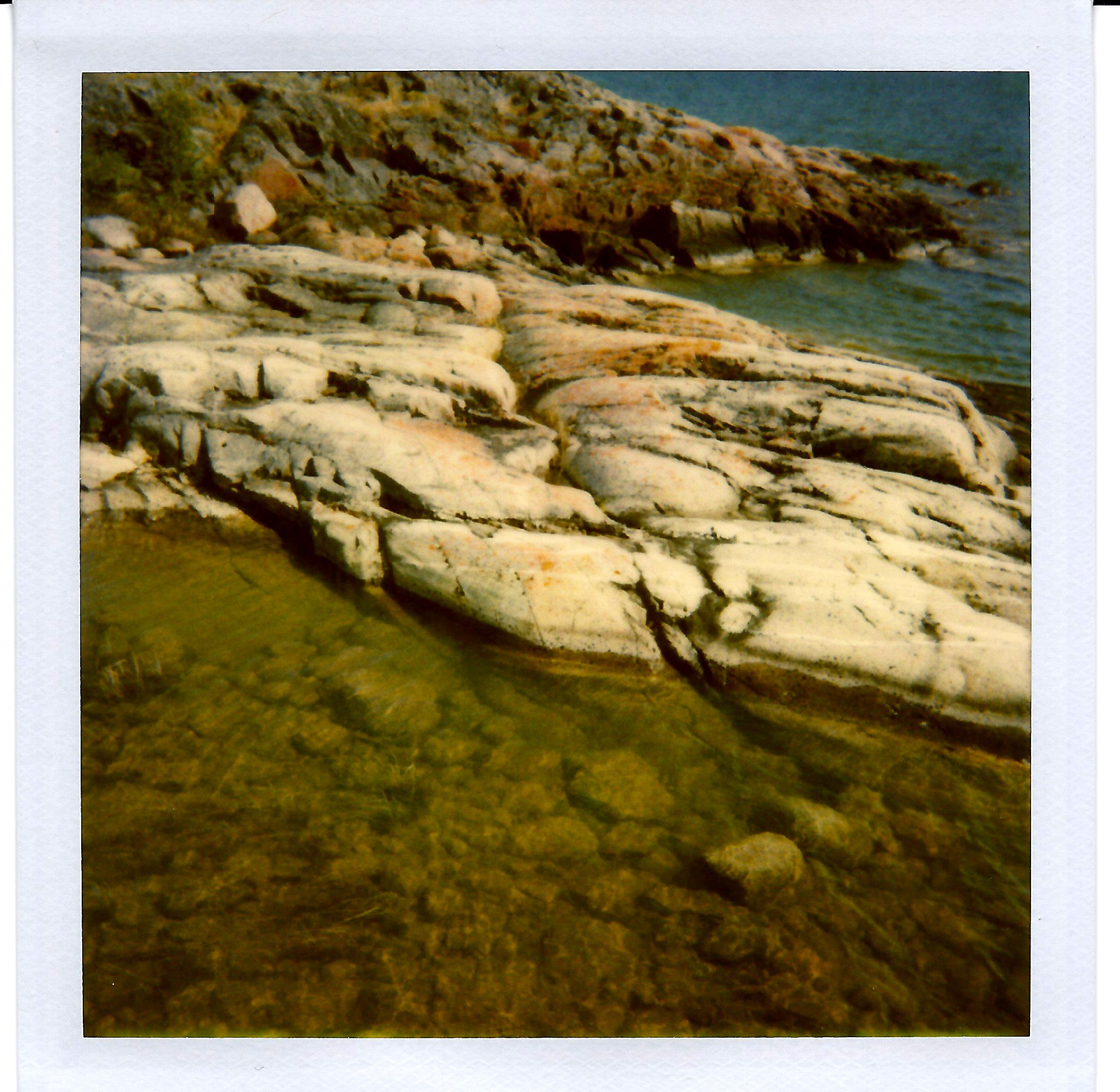
An oblique view of a roche moutonnée surface at Great Slave Lake, Northwest Territories, Canada; notice the contiguous, wavy rows of glaciated bedrock which resemble old-fashioned wigs as mentioned by Horace de Sassure

The contrasting appearance of the erosional stoss and lee aspects is very defined on roches moutonnées; all the sides and edges have been smoothed and eroded in the direction travelled by the glacier that once passed over it. It is often marked with glacial striations.

The rough and craggy down-ice (leeward) side is formed by plucking or quarrying, an erosional process initiated when ice melts slightly by pressure and seeps into cracks in the rock. When the water refreezes, the rock becomes attached to the glacier. But as the glacier continues its forward progress it subjects the stone to frost shattering, ripping chunks away from the rock formation. Studies show that the plucking of the lee side is a much more significant erosional process than the abrasion of the stoss side.

The side profile of a stoss and lee glaciated, bedrock knob (an erosional feature) is opposite to that of a drumlin (a depositional feature). In a drumlin, the steep side is facing the approaching glacier, rather than trailing it.

Even larger examples are known from Sweden where they are referred to as flyggbergs. The Swedish flyggbergs have been interpreted by Sten Rudberg and others as reshaped inselbergs. Ice-smoothed bedrock bumps which lack the steep, plucked lee side faces are referred to as whalebacks or rock drumlins.

Prest (1983) specifies a distinction between a glaciated "roches moutonnées surface" and a simple "stoss and lee" glacial feature. He says that the term "roches moutonnées surface" has been abused in the literature in which the term became interchangeable with the term "stoss and lee". He points out that a "roches moutonnées surface" is a continuous bedrock surface having a resemblance to the continuous, wavy or undulating rows of curls seen in French wigs at the time of Horace de Saussure while a simple stoss and lee feature refers only to a bedrock knob having a smooth stoss side and a plucked lee side appearance.

Roches moutonnées may not be entirely glacial landforms, since they may have already had a similar shape before glaciation. Jointing that contributes to their shape typically predates glaciation, and roche moutonnée-like forms can be found in tropical areas such as East Africa and Australia. Further, at Ivö Klack in Sweden, rock surfaces that have been exposed by kaolin mining and then become weathered resemble roches moutonnées.

== See also ==
- Glacial landforms – Landform created by the action of glaciers
- Lembert Dome, a roche moutonnée in Tuolumne Meadows

== Sources ==
- Tarbuck, E.J.; F.K. Lutgens (2002). Earth: An Introduction to Physical Geography, 7th ed. Upper Saddle River, NJ: Prentice Hall. p. 342. ISBN 0-13-092025-8.
- Trenhaile, Alan (2007). Geomorphology: A Canadian Perspective. Don Mills, Ontario: Oxford University Press. pp. 180–1. ISBN 978-0-19-542474-4.
