= Bromölla Municipality =

Municipality in Skåne County, Sweden

Bromölla Municipality Bromölla kommun
- Municipality
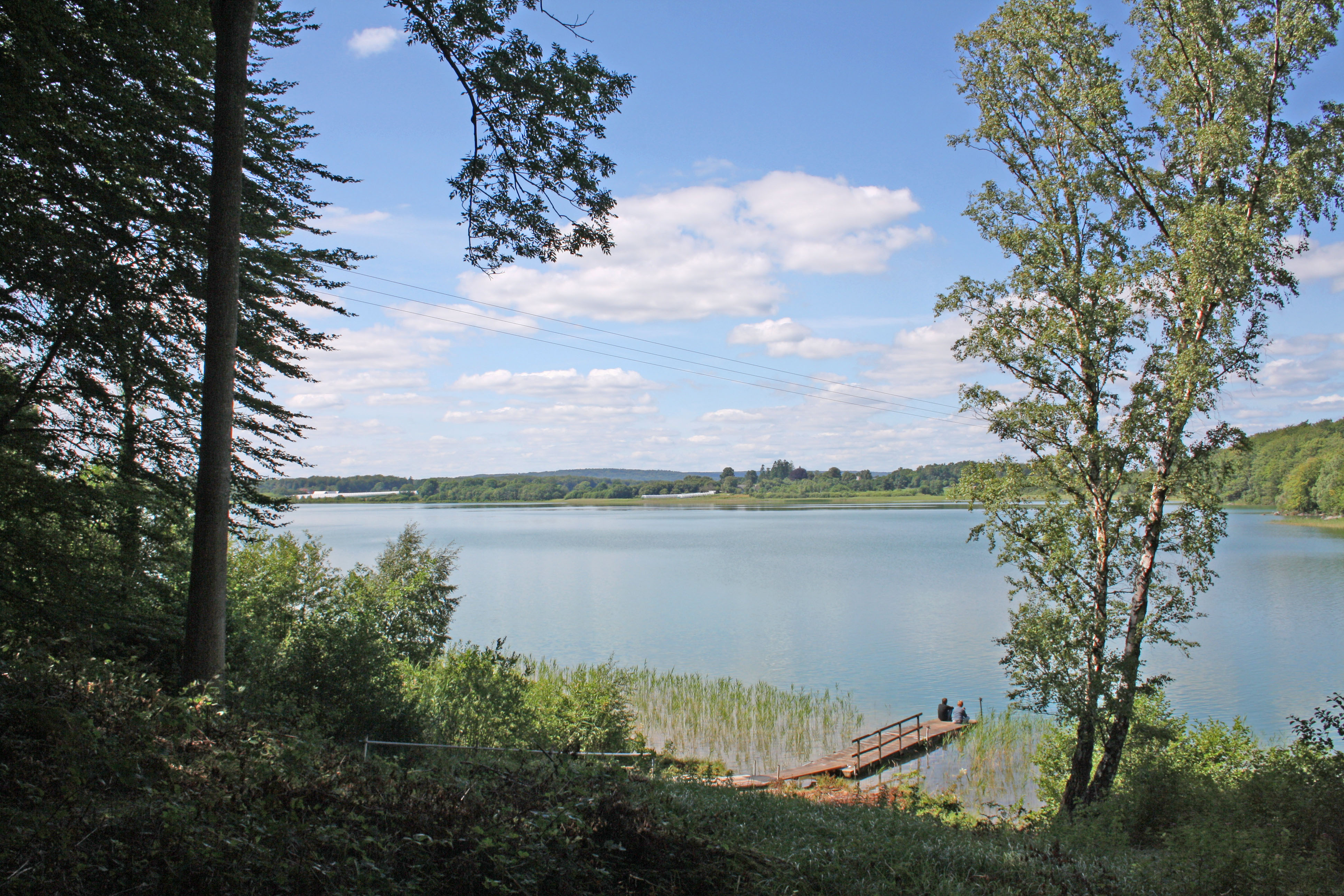

- Coat of arms

- Coordinates: 56°03′N 14°28′E
- Country: Sweden
- National Area: South Sweden
- County: Skåne County
- Seat: Bromölla

Area
  - Total: 197.14 km^{2} (76.12 sq mi)
  - Land: 162.5 km^{2} (62.7 sq mi)
  - Water: 34.64 km^{2} (13.37 sq mi)
- Area as of 1 January 2014.

Population (30 June 2025)
  - Total: 12,485
  - Density: 76.83/km^{2} (199.0/sq mi)
- Time zone: UTC+1 (CET)
  - Summer (DST): UTC+2 (CEST)
- ISO 3166 code: SE
- Province: Scania
- Municipal code: 1272
- Website: www.bromolla.se

Bromölla Municipality (Swedish: Bromölla kommun) is a municipality in Skåne County in South Sweden in southern Sweden. Its seat is located in the town Bromölla.

Bromölla was in 1967 reunited with Ivetofta (from which it had been detached as a market town in 1942). In 1974, Näsum was added and the municipality's present territory was defined.

== History ==
The name Bromölla translates to "Bridge Mill", one or more mills used at least from the 17th to the 19th century, adjacent to a small river. The municipal arms depict a bridge over a river, and a water wheel symbolizing the mill.

== Urban areas ==
There are 5 urban areas (also called a Tätort or locality) in Bromölla Municipality.

In the table they are listed according to the size of the population as of 31 December 2005. The municipal seat is in bold characters.

#	Locality	Population
1	**Bromölla**	7,428
2	Näsum	1,119
3	Valje	771
4	Gualöv	539
5	Nymölla	294

A small part of Valje is situated in Sölvesborg Municipality.

== Demographics ==
This is a demographic table based on Bromölla Municipality's electoral districts in the 2022 Swedish general election sourced from SVT's election platform, in turn taken from SCB official statistics.

In total there were 12,634 residents, including 9,567 Swedish citizens of voting age resident in the municipality. 35.8% voted for the left coalition and 63.1% for the right coalition. Indicators are in percentage points except population totals and income.

Location	Residents	Citizen adults	Left vote	Right vote	Employed	Swedish parents	Foreign heritage	Income SEK	Degree
Location			%	%					
Bromölla C	1,737	1,359	36.3	62.4	82	79	21	22,946	27
Bromölla S	1,826	1,378	40.6	58.1	72	66	34	21,402	25
Bromölla V	1,602	1,159	38.8	60.3	74	64	36	21,120	28
Bromölla Ö	1,779	1,299	37.7	61.3	77	79	21	25,265	30
Ivetofta	1,840	1,402	33.2	66.4	84	87	13	27,089	34
Nymölla-Gualöv	1,958	1,509	35.8	63.4	85	88	12	26,152	33
Näsum	1,892	1,461	28.9	69.5	82	83	17	24,001	25
Source: SVT

== Elections ==
These are the election results since the 1972 municipal reform. The results of Sweden Democrats were not published by the SCB between 1988 and 1998 due to the party's small size nationally so has been denoted as "0.0". Bromölla has traditionally seen outright majorities for the Social Democrats, although in the 2000s its domination has lessened.

=== Riksdag ===
Year	Turnout	Votes	V	S	MP	C	L	KD	M	SD	ND
1973	92.0	6,690	6.2	61.7	0.0	17.1	6.2	1.1	7.1	0.0	0.0
1976	93.1	7,272	4.5	61.3	0.0	16.2	7.9	1.2	8.5	0.0	0.0
1979	92.5	7,513	4.9	62.5	0.0	10.2	9.3	0.7	12.2	0.0	0.0
1982	93.2	7,827	5.0	64.7	0.9	10.1	5.3	0.8	13.1	0.0	0.0
1985	90.2	7,807	5.0	62.4	0.8	7.4	10.1	0.0	12.3	0.0	0.0
1988	88.4	6,096	5.0	65.1	4.7	6.8	7.0	1.3	9.9	0.0	0.0
1991	86.4	7,609	4.7	56.8	2.4	5.4	5.4	4.0	12.9	0.0	6.9
1994	88.0	8,834	6.9	64.0	4.3	4.7	3.9	2.6	11.8	0.0	1.2
1998	80.3	5,460	15.8	51.7	3.3	3.3	2.9	7.6	13.4	0.0	0.0
2002	77.9	7,080	8.7	56.3	2.9	3.8	7.6	7.0	9.3	3.4	0.0
2006	81.3	7,426	5.8	51.9	2.3	4.7	5.5	4.5	15.9	7.4	0.0
2010	84.3	7,853	4.6	41.1	4.0	3.5	5.5	2.8	22.4	15.4	0.0
2014	85.8	8,029	4.5	37.9	4.2	3.0	3.0	2.1	15.3	28.4	0.0

Blocs

This lists the relative strength of the socialist and centre-right blocs since 1973, but parties not elected to the Riksdag are inserted as "other", including the Sweden Democrats results from 1988 to 2006, but also the Christian Democrats pre-1991 and the Greens in 1982, 1985 and 1991. The sources are identical to the table above. The coalition or government mandate marked in bold formed the government after the election. New Democracy got elected in 1991 but are still listed as "other" due to the short lifespan of the party.

Year	Turnout	Votes	Left	Right	SD	Other	Elected
1973	92.0	6,690	**67.9**	30.4	0.0	1.9	98.1
1976	93.1	7,272	65.8	**32.6**	0.0	1.6	98.4
1979	92.5	7,513	67.4	**31.7**	0.0	0.9	99.1
1982	93.2	7,827	**69.7**	28.5	0.0	1.8	98.2
1985	90.2	7,807	**67.4**	29.8	0.0	2.8	97.2
1988	88.4	6,096	**74.7**	23.6	0.0	2.7	97.3
1991	86.4	7,609	61.5	**27.7**	0.0	10.8	96.1
1994	88.0	8,834	**75.2**	23.0	0.0	1.8	98.2
1998	80.3	5,460	**70.8**	27.2	0.0	2.0	98.0
2002	77.9	7,080	**67.9**	27.7	0.0	4.4	95.6
2006	81.3	7,426	60.0	**30.6**	0.0	9.4	90.6
2010	84.3	7,853	49.7	**34.2**	15.4	0.7	99.3
2014	85.8	8,029	**46.6**	23.4	28.4	1.6	98.4

== Industry ==
IFÖ Sanitär was founded by William Abelgaard Nielsen in 1887 as a limestone and kaolin mining at the nearby Ivö island. Their main production is, and has been since 1936, to manufacture toilets and sinks. Toilets all around Sweden feature the IFÖ insignia. IFÖ Sanitär is, since 2002, owned by the Swedish venture capital company EQT AB.

Also important is the Nymölla Sylvamo paper mill, producing fine paper for the world.

== Culture ==
Bromölla has remains from the Stone Age, and even some findings of dinosaurs. More recent remains also attract visitors, among them old churches, mills and some other curiosities that have survived modernisation. In the municipality are several cultural houses, rural museums and mansions that can be visited.

== Notable people ==
- Johanna Sjöberg (born 1978), swimmer
- Inge Danielsson (1941–2021), footballer
- Sanna Nielsen (born 1984), singer, television presenter and musical theatre performer
- Jimmie Åkesson (born 1979), politician and author
