= Hallandsåsen =

Coordinates: 56°22′N 12°58′E

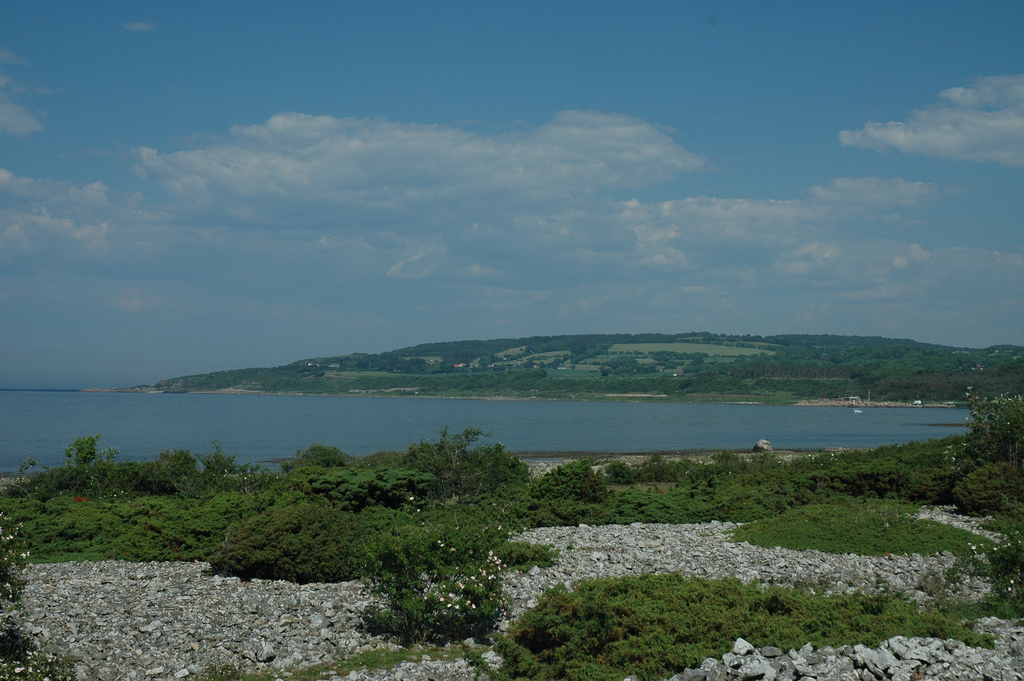
Hallandsåsen at the north west point of Skåne

Hallandsåsen is a horst on the border between the Swedish counties Skåne and Halland.

It is part of a geological formation that includes an island in the sea outside the village of Torekov near Båstad called Hallands Väderö. The geological formation continues with the Linderödsåsen in Skåne. It was formed during the Late Cretaceous period 80 million years ago. It reaches its highest point at Högalteknall near the village of Hasslöv at 224 metres. In modern times it is most noted for the project which serves to create a tunnel through it to speed up railway communications, the Hallandsås Tunnel and the two skiing centres which were opened during the 1980s. In older times it was most noted for being a dangerous route for the postal services which often were robbed by people in the area. The "Snapphane" guerrilla movement of the late 17th century also operated out of the woods on the horst.
