= Valje =

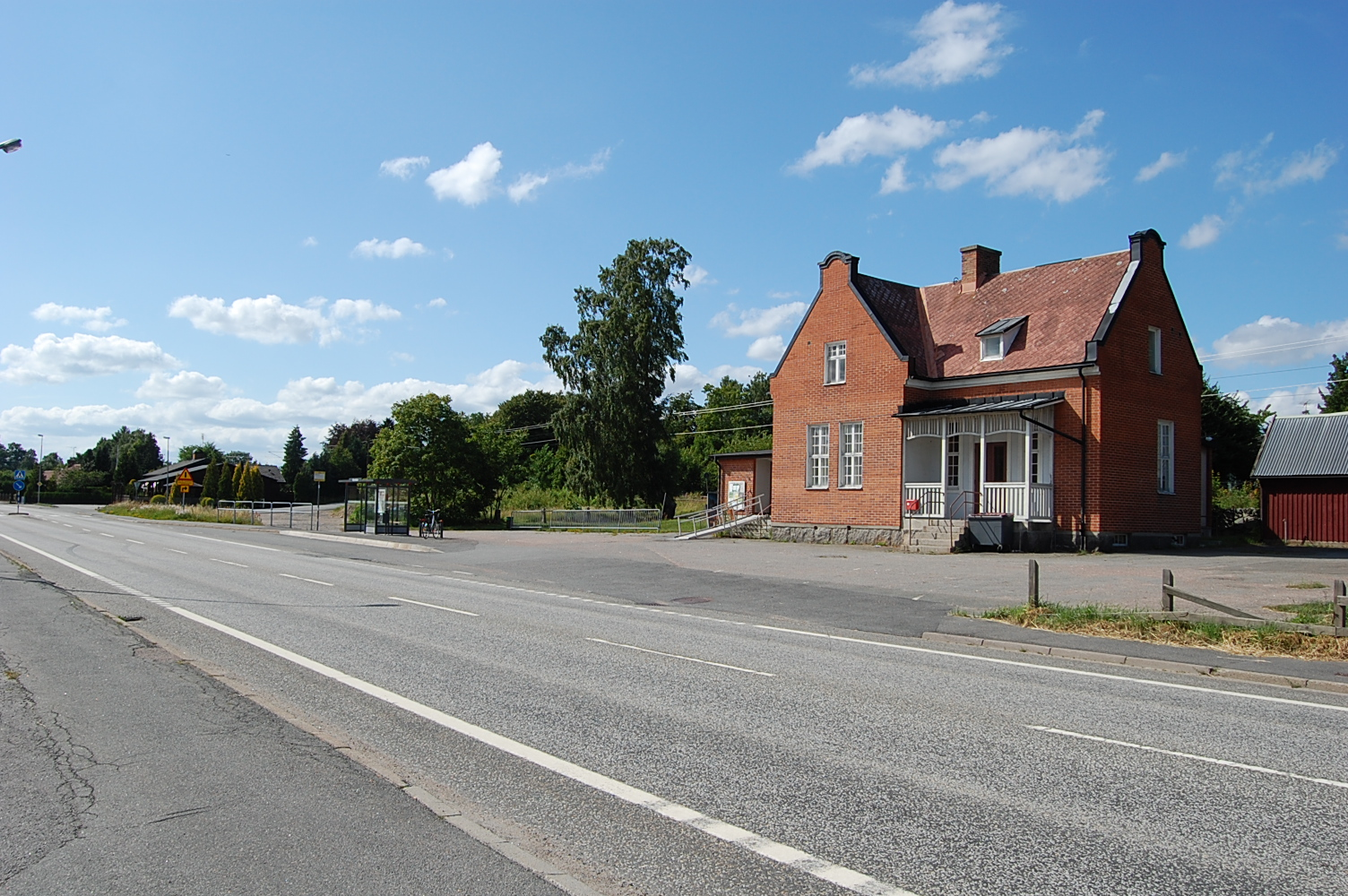

- Location within Skåne Location within Blekinge Location within Sweden
- Coordinates: 56°03′N 14°34′E
- Country: Sweden
- Province: Skåne and Blekinge
- County: Skåne County and Blekinge County
- Municipality: Bromölla Municipality and Sölvesborg Municipality

Area
  - Total: 0.89 km^{2} (0.34 sq mi)

Population (31 December 2010)
  - Total: 823
  - Density: 921/km^{2} (2,390/sq mi)
- Time zone: UTC+1 (CET)
  - Summer (DST): UTC+2 (CEST)

Valje (Swedish pronunciation: [ˈvâlːjɛ]) is a bimunicipal locality divided by Bromölla Municipality, Skåne County and Sölvesborg Municipality, Blekinge County in Sweden. It had 823 inhabitants in 2010. The small river Sissebäck makes up the border between the municipalities. The greater part is in Scania, with about 10% of the population in Blekinge.
