= Linderödsåsen =

Geological formation

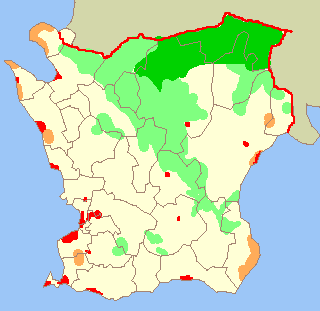
On this land map, the Linderödsås is the forested part from N-W to S-E.

The Linderödsåsen is a ridge, geologically a horst, in the province of Skåne in southernmost Sweden. It lies at the edge of the Baltic shield, in the Tornquist Zone, and continues with the Hallandsåsen in north western direction towards the Kattegat.

It stretches through Skåne from northwest to southeast. On the map it is situated in the middle of the province. It continues south-east down to the shore, mostly consisting of rocks, and ends with the notable steep Stenshuvud steep at 55°40′N 14°16′E.

In its central parts, around Höör Municipality, the ridge has a height of 100–120 meters. The average width is 15-30 kilometers. Its highest point is at 196 meters.

Administratively, it used to mark the border between Malmöhus County and Kristianstad County (united in 1999 as Skåne County).

Although a region of natural beauty and rich with wildlife, the Linderödsåsen is currently threatened by the quasi-industrial development of massive windfarm projects.
