= Ivö Lake =

Lake in Scania

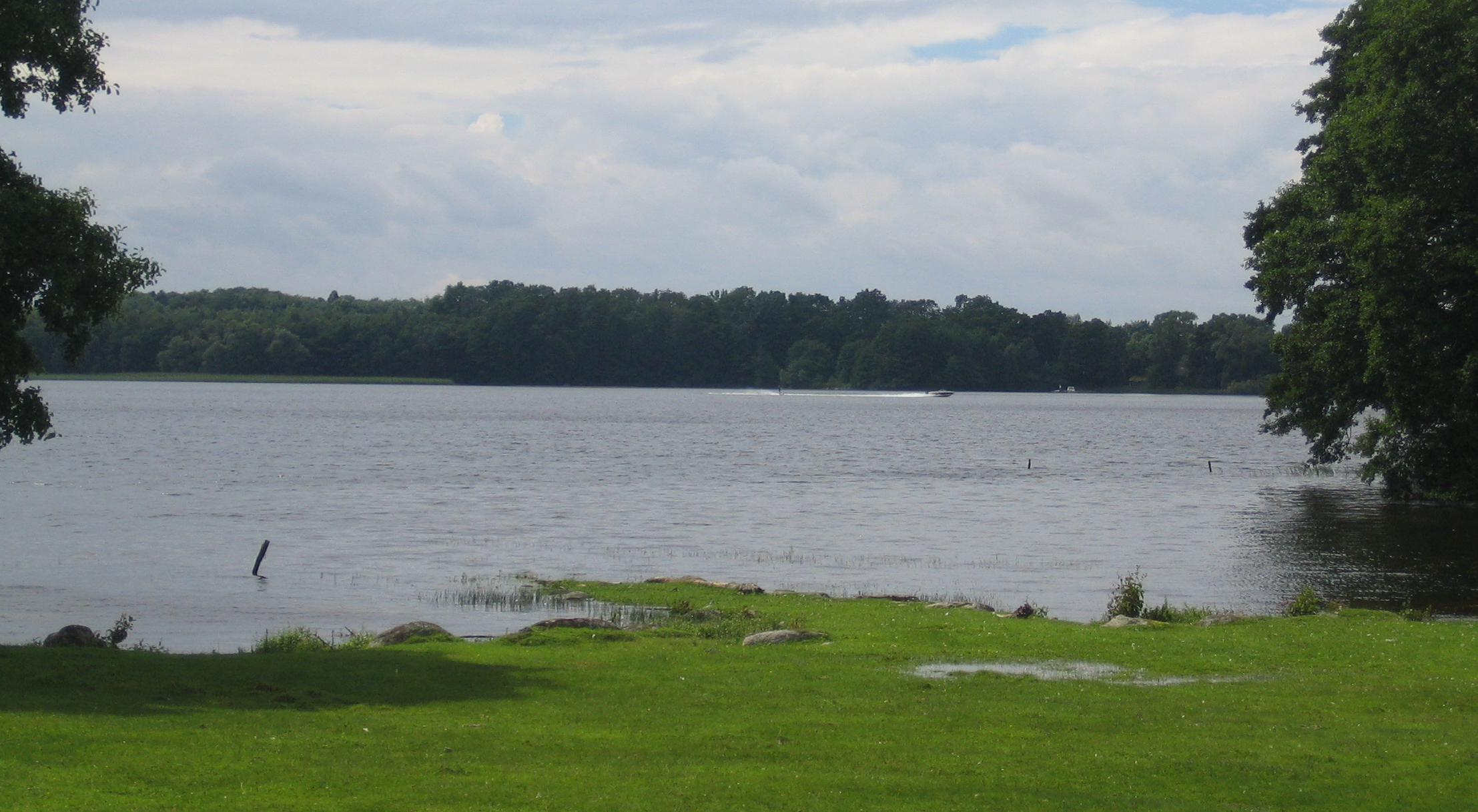

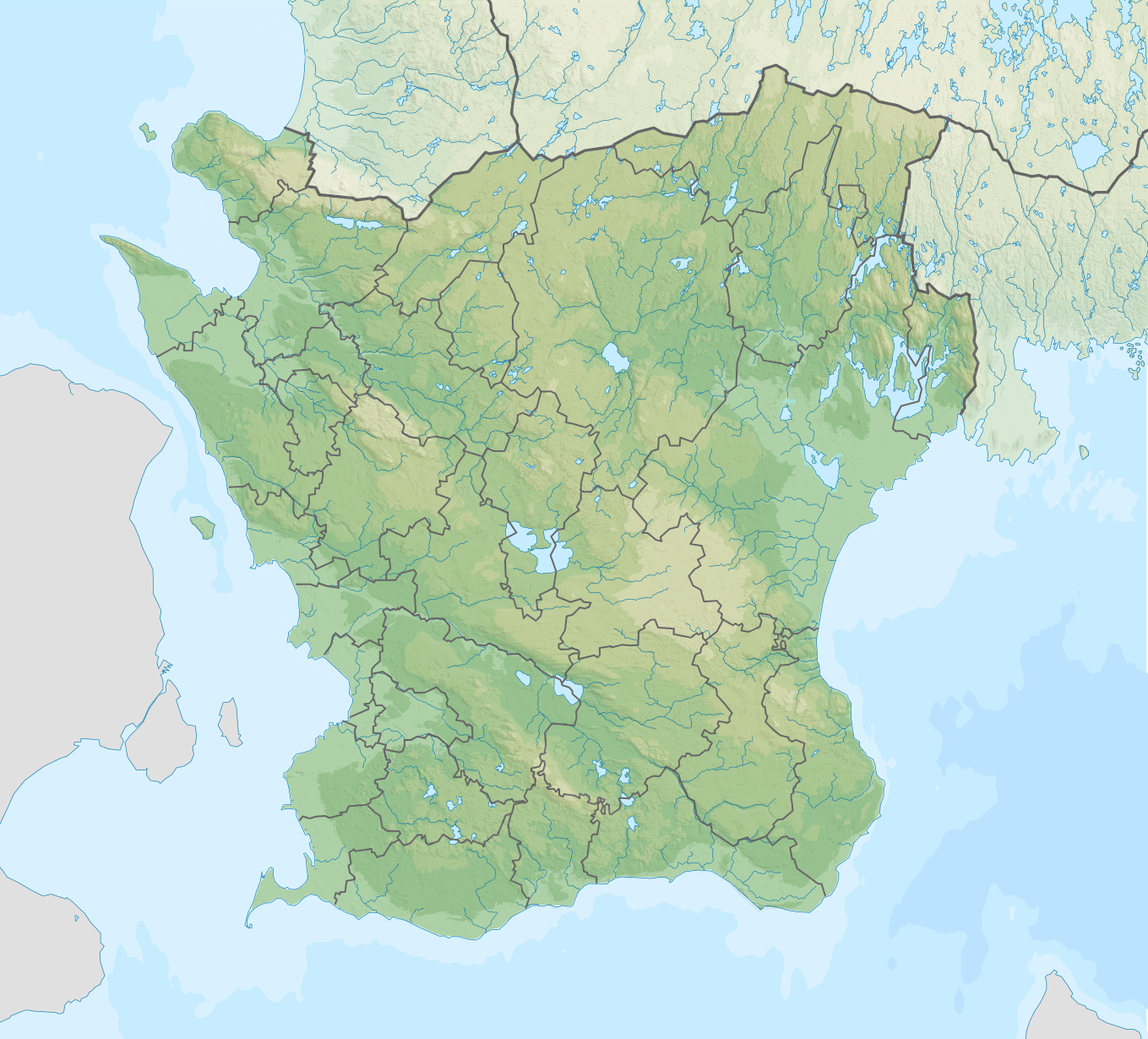
- Location within Skåne Location within Sweden
- Location: Scania
- Coordinates: 56°5′N 14°25′E
- Basin countries: Sweden
- Surface area: 55 km^{2} (21 sq mi)
- Max. depth: 50 m (160 ft)
- Islands: Ivö

Ivö Lake (Swedish: Ivösjön) is the largest and deepest lake of Skåne, Sweden, located in the municipalities of Kristianstad and Bromölla in the northeastern part of Skåne County. It covers an area of just under 55 km^{2} (21 sq mi), with a maximum depth of 50 meters. The lake is the richest in fish species in Sweden, including pike, salmon, burbot, vendace, bream, ide, ruffe, minnow, rudd, and spined loach, rare for this area, which has prompted biodiversity conservation efforts and attention from among others EU Natura 2000. 25-30 different species are regularly caught in the lake. It is very well known among fishing enthusiasts, not only in Sweden but in many countries in Europe.

A lake with numerous islands and sheltered bays, it has become a popular tourist destination for sightseeing as well as fishing. It is surrounded by hills with deciduous forests and valleys with fertile soil, and is located in a climate zone suitable for fruit tree cultivation. The area is one of Scania's fruit districts.

== Ivö ==
The largest island in the lake, Ivö, has a permanent, year-round population. A free, cable-driven car ferry operates a regular scheduled service to the island from the village Barum on the mainland. On the island are the ruins of Anders Sunesøn's castle Ivöhus. Sunesøn, a Danish archbishop of Lund, died in Ivöhus in 1228.

Ivö is a place of geological interest as it contains relict landforms and fossils dating to the Campanian age of the Late Cretaceous epoch. These features are exposed at a location known as Ivö Klack which was first described geologically by Gerard De Geer in 1889. The locality contains sedimentary rocks overlying basement gneiss and kaolinite. Ivö Klack started operating as a kaolinite quarry in 1886. The site is illustrative of the deep weathering process that led to the formation of the Sub-Mesozoic hilly relief that covers much of Sweden and Norway.

At Ivö Klack weathered rock surfaces exposed by kaolinite mining resemble rôches moutonnées. This has been put forward as argument for that rôches moutonnées elsewhere may not be entirely of glacial origin having formed before glaciation.

== Eponymy ==
Stomiopeltites ivoeensis, a species of fossil (Cretaceous) fungi (Ascomycota, Dothideomycetes, order Micropeltidiales) found in a nearby quarry was named after the lake.
