= Bromölla =

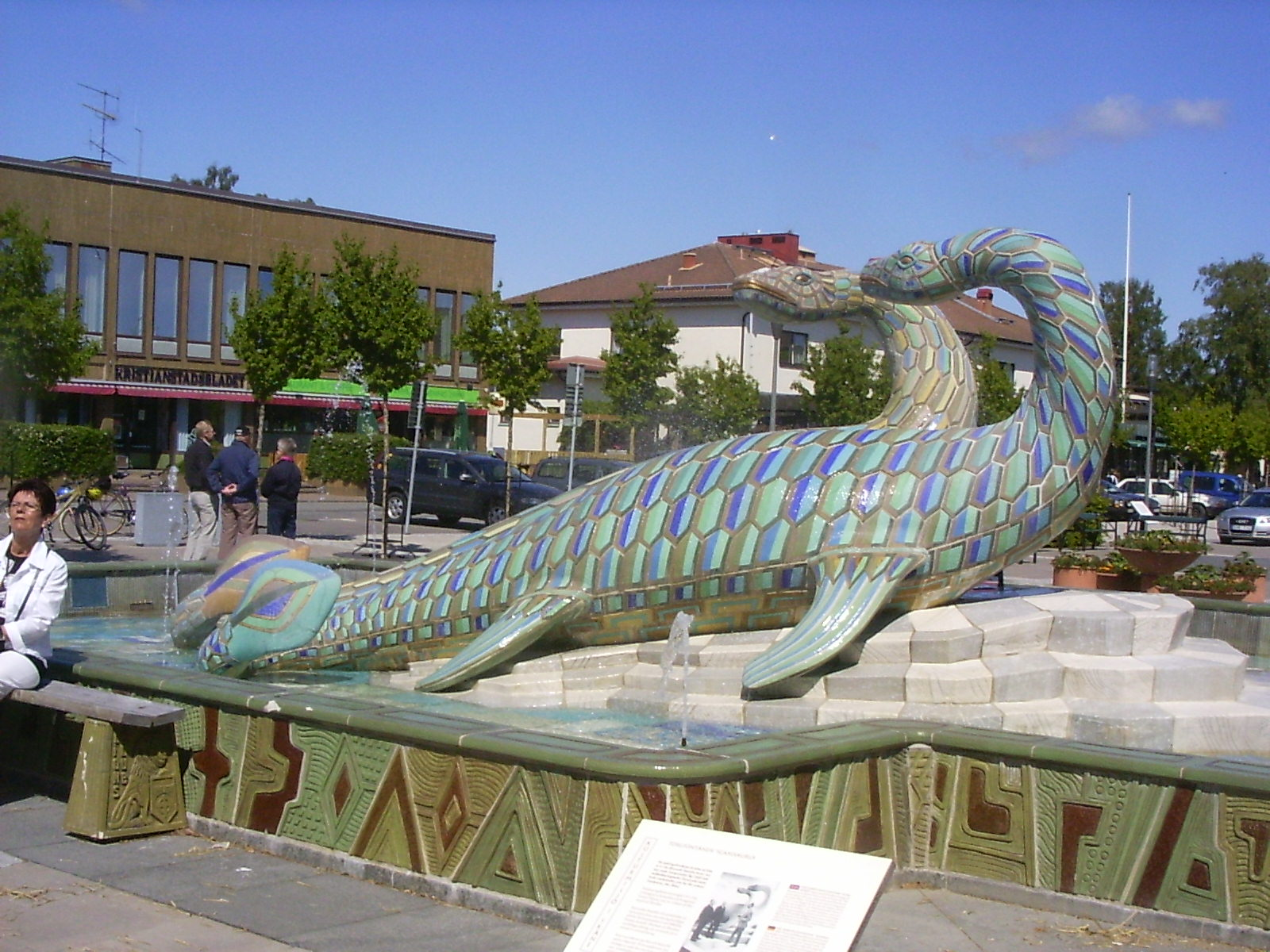
- Bromölla

- Coat of arms

- Location within Skåne Location within Sweden
- Coordinates: 56°03′N 14°28′E
- Country: Sweden
- Province: Skåne
- County: Skåne County
- Municipality: Bromölla Municipality

Area
  - Total: 5.58 km^{2} (2.15 sq mi)

Population (31 December 2010)
  - Total: 7,595
  - Density: 1,362/km^{2} (3,530/sq mi)
- Time zone: UTC+1 (CET)
  - Summer (DST): UTC+2 (CEST)

Bromölla (Swedish pronunciation: [brʊˈmœ̂lːa]) is a locality and the seat of Bromölla Municipality, Skåne County, Sweden with 7,595 inhabitants in 2010.

The town of Bromölla only consisted of a few houses until it began to grow about 100 years ago around a newly established limestone quarry, leading to the establishment of several ceramics industries. The area has grown up around the entailed estate of Årup and the pertaining parish of Ivetofta. As the railroad between Kristianstad and Sölvesborg established a station in 1886, the first ceramic industri – Ifö – was opened in 1887.
