= 2014 in rugby league =

Top-level rugby league in 2014 centred on Australasia's 2014 NRL Auckland Nines, 2014 NRL season and the Super League XIX. High-profile representative competitions included the 2014 Rugby League Four Nations (held in Australia and New Zealand) and the 2014 State of Origin series.

== February ==
7: Super League XIX begins with the Huddersfield Giants upsetting last year's champions Wigan Warriors at the DW Stadium in Wigan.
14 & 15: Inaugural NRL Auckland Nines are held at Eden Park in Auckland, New Zealand. The North Queensland Cowboys are inaugural champions after beating Brisbane 16–7 in the final.
22: Sydney Roosters win the 2014 World Club Challenge after beating Wigan Warriors 36–14 at Allianz Stadium in Sydney, Australia.
25: Europe's Bradford Bulls team are deducted six Super League competition points after entering administration.

== March ==
6: 2014 NRL season begins with the South Sydney Rabbitohs upsetting last year's champions Sydney Roosters at the ANZ Stadium in Sydney.

== April ==
13: The Coupe de France Lord Derby final is played, with Toulouse Olympique defeating AS Carcassonne 46–10 before 6,763 at Stade Albert Domec

== May ==
2: The 2014 ANZAC Test is played, with Australia defeating New Zealand 30–18 before 25,429 at Allianz Stadium.
3: The Pacific Rugby League International is played, with Samoa defeating Fiji 32–16 before 9,063 at Sportingbet Stadium in Penrith, Australia. In doing so they also secured qualification as the fourth and final team to compete at the 2014 Four Nations later in the year.
3: The City vs Country Origin is played, with City and Country drawing for only the second time since being 'Under origin selection rules'. The match finished 26 points apiece in front of a packed crowd at Dubbo's Apex Oval.
17 & 18: The Northern Hemisphere's Super League held its special Magic Weekend. The Magic Weekend was held at the City of Manchester Stadium in Manchester, England. It made several records such as attendance with Day 1 recording the biggest ever attendance with 36,339 fans attending the ground on one day. While the total aggregate attendance of 64,552 is the biggest ever attendance recorded for Super League's showcase weekend.

== June ==
14: New South Wales made history, finally winning the State of Origin series after losing 8 consecutive. New South Wales won the historic third-match in the series 6–4 before 83,421 at ANZ Stadium in Sydney, New South Wales.

== July ==
13: London Broncos are relegated from the Super League.
19: Canada have beaten Jamaica in the fourth annual Caribbean Carnival Cup.
27: Barrow Raiders are relegated from the Championship.

== August ==
3: Swinton Lions are relegated from the Championship.
10: Rochdale Hornets are relegated from the Championship.
10: The lone Colonial Cup series match is played, with Canada making history and defeating USA 52–14 before 7,356 at Lamport Stadium to win their first ever Colonial Cup since the competition inaugurated in 2010.
11: North Wales Crusaders are relegated from the Championship.
23: The 2014 Challenge Cup final is played, with the Leeds Rhinos defeating the Castleford Tigers 23–10 before 77,914 at Wembley Stadium.

== September ==
7 : Keighley Cougars are relegated from the Championship on a dramatic final day of the regular season. They finished just one point behind 8th placed Batley Bulldogs and 9th placed Whitehaven.
12: Bradford Bulls are relegated from the Super League. They have been participating in the Super League since its inauguration in 1996 and have won four titles being 1997, 2001, 2003 and 2005.

== October ==
5: 2014 NRL Grand Final is played and South Sydney are the new premiers after defeating the Canterbury Bulldogs 30–6 in front of a record 'Rectangular Shaped (ANZ) Stadium' crowd of 83,833 at ANZ Stadium in Sydney. This is also the Rabbitohs' first premiership title in 43 years
7: Hunslet Hawks win promotion to the Championship for the 2015 season.
11: 2014 Super League Grand Final is played and St. Helens are the new champions after defeating a '12-man' Wigan Warriors team 14–6 before 70,102 at Old Trafford in Strentford, England.
19: 2014 Hayne/Mannah Cup is played and Fiji are the champions after defeating Lebanon 40–28 at Remondis Stadium in Woolooware, New South Wales.

== November ==
2: 2014 European Cup is won by Scotland for the first time. Scotland have therefore qualified to play alongside Australia, England and New Zealand in the 2016 Four Nations.
15: 2014 Four Nations Final is won by New Zealand who defeated Australia 22–18 before 25,093 at Westpac Stadium in Wellington, New Zealand.

== December ==
19: New Zealand halfback, Shaun Johnson is announced as the best official player in 2014 after being awarded the Golden Boot.

== Domestic Competitions ==
=== Australasia ===
==== NRL Auckland Nines ====
The 2014 NRL Auckland Nines tournament will run over two days from 14 to 15 February 2014. All the matches are held at Auckland's Eden Park.

==== National Rugby League ====
The 2014 NRL Season will run from 6 March 2014 to 5 October 2014, with the latter date hosting the Grand Final at Sydney's ANZ Stadium.

2014 NRL season
Pos	Team	Pld	W	D	L	B	PF	PA	PD	Pts
1	Sydney Roosters	24	16	0	8	2	615	385	+230	36
2	Manly Warringah Sea Eagles	24	16	0	8	2	502	399	+103	36
3	South Sydney Rabbitohs (P)	24	15	0	9	2	585	361	+224	34
4	Penrith Panthers	24	15	0	9	2	506	426	+80	34
5	North Queensland Cowboys	24	14	0	10	2	596	406	+190	32
6	Melbourne Storm	24	14	0	10	2	536	460	+76	32
7	Canterbury-Bankstown Bulldogs	24	13	0	11	2	446	439	+7	30
8	Brisbane Broncos	24	12	0	12	2	549	456	+93	28
9	New Zealand Warriors	24	12	0	12	2	571	491	+80	28
10	Parramatta Eels	24	12	0	12	2	477	580	−103	28
11	St. George Illawarra Dragons	24	11	0	13	2	469	528	−59	26
12	Newcastle Knights	24	10	0	14	2	463	571	−108	24
13	Wests Tigers	24	10	0	14	2	420	631	−211	24
14	Gold Coast Titans	24	9	0	15	2	372	538	−166	22
15	Canberra Raiders	24	8	0	16	2	466	623	−157	20
16	Cronulla-Sutherland Sharks	24	5	0	19	2	334	613	−279	14

==== State of Origin ====
2014 State of Origin series

=== Europe ===
==== Super League XIX ====
The Super League is the top club competition in Europe. In 2014 there are thirteen English teams and one French team in the 2014 season, known as Super League XIX with the bottom two teams on the table set to be relegated at the end of the regular season.

Super League XIX
Pos	Team	Pld	W	D	L	PF	PA	PD	Pts	Qualification
1	St Helens (L, C)	27	19	0	8	796	563	+233	38	Play-offs
2	Wigan Warriors	27	18	1	8	834	429	+405	37	Play-offs
3	Huddersfield Giants	27	17	3	7	785	626	+159	37	Play-offs
4	Castleford Tigers	27	17	2	8	814	583	+231	36	Play-offs
5	Warrington Wolves	27	17	1	9	793	515	+278	35	Play-offs
6	Leeds Rhinos	27	15	2	10	685	421	+264	32	Play-offs
7	Catalans Dragons	27	14	1	12	733	667	+66	29	Play-offs
8	Widnes Vikings	27	13	1	13	611	725	−114	27	Play-offs
9	Hull Kingston Rovers	27	10	3	14	627	665	−38	23	
10	Salford Red Devils	27	11	1	15	608	695	−87	23	
11	Hull F.C.	27	10	2	15	653	586	+67	22	
12	Wakefield Trinity Wildcats	27	10	1	16	557	750	−193	21	
13	Bradford Bulls (R)	27	8	0	19	512	984	−472	10 (Note: Bradford Bulls deducted 6 points on 25 February 2014 for entering administration)	Relegation to Championship
14	London Broncos (R)	27	1	0	26	438	1237	−799	2	Relegation to Championship

(C) Champions; (L) League Leaders' Shield Winners; (R) Relegated

==== Carnegie Challenge Cup ====
The Rugby League Challenge Cup is the most prestigious knock-out competition in the world of Rugby League. It features teams from across Europe including England, Scotland, Wales, France and Russia.

The final of the 2014 Cup is held at the prestigious Wembley Stadium in London on 23 August.

=== Australia & Oceania ===
Nations	Competition	Teams	Instituted	Last season	Winner	Tier/Division
AUS/NZL	National Youth Competition (NYC)	16	2008	2014	New Zealand Warriors	(Australia) Youth
AUS/NZL	New South Wales Cup (NSWRL)	13	1908	2014	Penrith Panthers	(Australia) 2nd Tier
AUS/PNG	Queensland Cup (QRL)	13	1996	2014	Northern Pride	(Australia) 2nd Tier
AUS	(New South Wales) Ron Massey Cup	12	2003	2014	The Entrance Tigers	(Australia) 3rd Tier
AUS	(Queensland) FOGS Cup	11	2001	2014	Eastern Suburbs Tigers	(Australia) 3rd Tier
COK	Cook Islands League	6	1994	2012	Titikaveka Bulldogs	(Cook Islands) 1st Tier
FIJ	Vodafone Cup	14	2010	2014	Saru Dragons	(Fiji) 1st Tier
NZL	Pirtek National Premiership (NZRL)	7	2010	2014	Canterbury Bulls	(New Zealand) 1st Tier
PNG	PNG Digicel Cup	10	1990	2014	Hela Wigmen	(Papua New Guinea) 1st Tier
SAM	Samoa Rugby League	6	?	2014	Apia Barracudas	(Samoa) 1st Tier
TON	Tongan National Rugby League	12	1988	?	Lapaha Knights	(Tonga) 1st Tier

=== Europe ===
Nations	Competition	Teams	Instituted	Latest Year	Winner	Tier/Division
BIH	Bosnia & Herzegovina Championship	3	2013	2014	RLC Bjeli Zecevi	(Bosnia and Herzegovina) 1st Tier
CZE	CZRLA First Division	7	2011	2014	Lokomotiva Beroun	(Czech Republic) 1st Tier
CZE	CZRLA Second Division	4	2011	2014	Chrudim Rabbitohs	(Czech Republic) 2nd Tier
ENG/WAL	Championship	12	2003	2014	Leigh Centurions	(United Kingdom) 2nd Tier
ENG/WAL	Championship 1	14	2003	2014	Hunslet Hawks	(United Kingdom) 3rd Tier
DEN/SWE	Pan-Scandinavian Cup	3	2013	2014	Skåne Crusaders	(Denmark) / (Sweden) 1st Tier
DEN	Danish Rugby League Championship	2	2013	2014	Copenhagen RLFC	(Denmark) 1st Tier
FRA	Elite One Championship	8	1931	2013–14	Toulouse Olympique	(France) 1st Tier
FRA	Elite Two Championship	13	1982	2013–14	RC Baho XIII	(France) 2nd Tier
FRA	National Division 1	21	1976	2013–14	Realmont XIII	(France) 3rd Tier
FRA	National Division 2	34	1978	2013–14	Val de Dagne XIII	(France) 4th Tier
GRE	Hellenic Championship	?	2014	2014	Rhodes Knights	(Greece) 1st Tier
GRE	Hellenic Championship B Division	?	2014	2014	Neapoli Lakonia	(Greece) 2nd Tier
IRE	All-Ireland Championship	10	2001	2014	Barnhall Butchers	(Republic of Ireland) 1st Tier
LAT	Latvian Rugby League Crown	4		2013	Valmieras Fēnikss	(Latvia) 1st Tier
MLT	MRL Dove Men+Care Championship	?	?	2013	Malta Origin RL	(Malta) 1st Tier
NED	NRLB Nationale Kampioenschap	2	2014			(Netherlands) 1st Tier
NOR	Norge National Championship	5	2010	2013	Oslo Capitals	(Norway) 1st Tier
RUS	Russian Championship	6	1991	2014	Vereya Bears	(Russia) 1st Tier
SCO	Deuchars IPA National League	4	1997	2014	Aberdeen Warriors	(Scotland) 1st Tier
SER	Serbian Championship	6	2002	2014	Red Star RLC	(Serbia) 1st Tier
SPA	Campeonato Nacional de Liga	4	2014	2014	Irreductibles Edetans	(Spain) 1st Tier
SPA	Copa España	6	2014	2014	Ciencias Valencia	(Spain) 1st Tier
SWE	Sweden Super League	4	2011	2013	Spartacus Reds	(Sweden) 1st Tier
UKR	Ukrainian Championship	8	2012	2014	Legion XIII	(Ukraine) 1st Tier
WAL	South Wales Premiership	8	2003	2014	Torfaen Tigers	(Wales) 1st Tier
WAL	North Wales Conference	4	2012	2014	Conwy Celts	(Wales) 1st Tier

=== Africa ===
Nations	Competition	Teams	Instituted	Latest Year	Winner	Tier/Division
GHA	Ghana Championship	6	2014	2014	no final played	(Ghana) 1st Tier
RSA	Protea Cup	8	2013	2013–14	TUKS Blues	(South Africa) 1st Tier
RSA	Rhino Cup	4	2011	2014	TUKS Reds	(South Africa) 2nd Tier

=== Asia & the Middle East ===
Nations	Competition	Teams	Instituted	Latest Year	Winner	Tier/Division
LIB	Lebanon Championship	5	2002	2013–14	Jounieh Al-Galacticos	(Lebanon) 1st Tier
PHI	Philippines National Rugby League (PNRL)	9	2013	2013	MAAP Warriors	(Philippines) 1st Tier
THA	Thailand Rugby League Premiership	6	2014	2014	TBC	(Thailand) 1st Tier
UAE	Emirates Rugby League (ENRL)	?	2013	2014	Abu Dhabi Harlequins	(United Arab Emirates) 1st Tier

=== The Americas ===
Nations	Competition	Teams	Instituted	Latest Year	Winner	Tier/Division
CAN	British Columbia Rugby League (BCRLC)	6	2012	2014	Surrey Beavers	(Canada) 1st Tier
CAN	Ontario Rugby League (ORL)	4	2010	2014	Toronto Centruions	(Canada) 1st Tier
JAM	Jamaican Club Championship	5	2005	2014	GC Foster College	(Jamaica) 1st Tier
USA	USA Rugby League (USARL)	8	2011	2014	Philadelphia Fight	(United States) 1st Tier

== See also ==
- 2014 New Zealand rugby league season
