= Springbok colours =

Green and gold blazers awarded to members of the South Africa national rugby union team

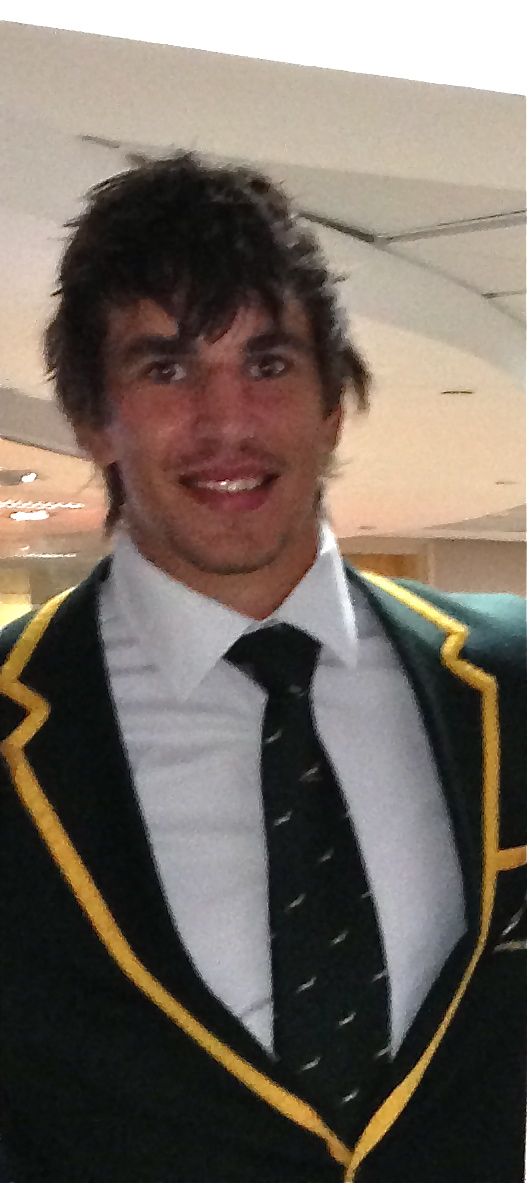
- Eben Etzebeth in Springbok colours, August 2013
- Designer: Paul Roos
- Year: 1906
- Type: Blazer

Springbok colours is the name given to green and gold blazers awarded to members of the South Africa national rugby union team. They were historically awarded to teams and individuals representing South Africa in international competition of any sport, following their creation in 1906. With the arrival of South Africa's new post-apartheid government in 1994, the name Springbok was abandoned by the various control boards since they felt that the term had been abused by the previous apartheid governments, and stigmatised by the anti-apartheid movement. An exception was made in the case of the national rugby union team, who have retained the practice of awarding colours.

== History ==
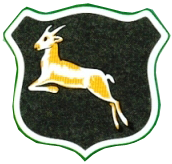
The first springbok logo was introduced in 1906 during a Springboks tour

The first Springbok colours were created in 1906 during the 1906–07 South Africa rugby union tour of the Northern Hemisphere as none had been provided for them and the captain Paul Roos decided that the team need to create their own emblem and nickname to prevent the British press creating one for them. Using the guidelines that the director of the South African Rugby Board (SARB) had given for the playing kit of bottle green jerseys and a gold collar, Roos instructed that a green blazer with gold piping and a Springbok emblem on the breast pocket would be made for the team in Richmond. Despite this, not many colours were made as they were not standard issue at the time. Later on they became standard issue for all sportsmen representing South Africa internationally, but primarily was used by rugby union as the creators.

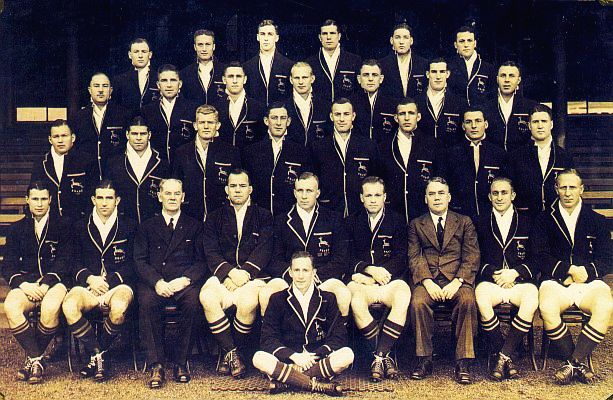
The South Africa rugby union team wearing Springbok colours in 1937

The first dispute over Springbok colours came from the rise of rugby league in South Africa in the 1950s. SARB felt it was their duty as members of the International Rugby Football Board to defend amateur rugby union against professional rugby league after several Springboks had defected to rugby league. In 1959, the SARB declared that all players that represented South Africa in rugby union had to sign a declaration they would not turn professional for two years. Any player who refused this was obliged to return his Springbok colours and was not permitted to purchase a replacement.

In 1963, the SARB took the step of copyrighting the Springbok emblem and Springbok colours as a badge under the Heraldry Act to pre-empt any other sporting body copyrighting it. The board initially declared it was happy to share the Springbok colours, providing that they were only awarded to white amateur sportspeople representing South Africa internationally. It was also an attempt to try and stop the South Africa national rugby league team from using the colours, though Rugby League South Africa circumvented this by developing their own version of the Springbok colours. Later legislation in 1971 was passed in order to enforce apartheid, so that only white South Africans could be awarded Springbok colours though this later extended to those deemed as "honorary whites". This came after three black Africans were awarded Springbok colours for competing in the World Paraplegic Games. Later as a result of the legislation, Glen Popham was not awarded Springbok colours following winning a gold medal in Karate in the 1969 South African Games alongside his white team, as his race was officially classified as Coloured which the South African National Olympic Committee were not aware of prior. As non-whites were not eligible to be selected for South African national sports teams, the Springbok colours came to be viewed as a symbol of white supremacy in apartheid South Africa, because they were only awarded to white sportspeople.

== Post apartheid ==
Following the repeal of apartheid legislation, Springbok colours started to be issued to non-whites. In 1994, following the election of Nelson Mandela and the African National Congress, the National Colours Board was set up to control the distribution of Springbok colours. Despite this, the majority of South Africa's sporting organisations stopped awarding Springbok colours, following the replacement of the Springbok by the Protea as the country's national sporting emblem by government demand. The only sporting body in South Africa that was allowed to retain Springbok colours was the South African Rugby Union as an act of conciliation towards the white minority who made up the majority of the national rugby union team.

In 2008, the South African Sports Minister claimed under the National Sport and Recreation Act, 1998, that the Springbok colours copyright had been transferred to the government and the SARU had been issuing it illegally, and requested they cease using it. However, legal writers stated that the South African government's claim had expired in 2007, while SARU's copyright still was valid and pursuant to the case of In re: Certification of the Constitution of the RSA 1996. If the government tried to stop the SARU issuing Springbok colours, then the government would be liable to pay millions of Rands in compensation. In 2013, as part of their "Yesterday's Heroes" programme, SARU retrospectively awarded Springbok colours to all non-whites who had played for a South African national team, such as the black SAARB Leopards and the Coloured Proteas.

Springbok colours are only awarded to South Africans. Australian Eddie Jones, who worked as a technical advisor to South Africa for the 2007 Rugby World Cup, was not allowed Springbok colours as a non-South African and was obliged to wear a South Africa tracksuit when pitchside. Following South Africa's victory that year, all other players and coaching team members were expected to wear their Springbok colours to the post-tournament awards dinner. In protest at Jones not being issued with colours, Bryan Habana gave his to Jones and the team attended the awards dinner in suits instead.

== Bibliography ==
- Cornelissen, Scarlett (2013). Sport Past and Present in South Africa: (Trans)forming the Nation. Routledge. ISBN 978-1317988595.
