= Sport in South Africa =

South African sport culture

Flag of South Africa

Sport has a significant role in South African culture. The three most popular mainstream sports in the country—cricket, football and rugby union—reflect the country's early British colonial influence. Approximately 70% of South Africans are interested in football, making it the most popular sport in the country, followed by rugby union and cricket.

South Africa was absent from international sport for much of the apartheid era due to sanctions, but started competing globally after the end of apartheid. South Africa is among a very few countries that have participated in world cups of all three major sports—cricket, football and rugby union. England, Ireland, Scotland, Canada, New Zealand and Australia are among other such nations. South Africa has hosted the 1995 Rugby World Cup, 2003 ICC Cricket World Cup and 2007 ICC World Twenty20, and 2010 FIFA World Cup.

== History ==
South Africa was banned from the 1964 Summer Olympics in Tokyo due to the apartheid policies. This ban effectively lasted until 1992. During this period, some athletes (such as Zola Budd and Kepler Wessels) left for other countries to compete internationally. Some athletes continued their sports careers in South Africa in isolation, with stars such as women's 400 metres runner Myrtle Bothma setting a world record at the South African championships.

Some sports teams toured South Africa as "Rebel Tours" and played the Springbok rugby union and cricket teams during the isolation period.

In 1977, Commonwealth Presidents and Prime Ministers agreed, as part of their support for the international campaign against apartheid, to discourage contact and competition between their athletes and sporting organisations, teams, or individuals from South Africa.

== Regulation ==
The National Sport and Recreation Act (1998) provides for the promotion and development of sport in South Africa and coordinates relationships among the Sports Commission, sports federations, and related agencies. It aims to correct imbalances in sport by promoting equity and democracy and by providing dispute-resolution mechanisms. It empowers the Minister to make regulations, and allows the Sports Commission (and NOCSA in respect of the Olympic Games) to coordinate, promote and develop sport in South Africa. Membership of the Sports Commission is open to a wide range of sports bodies, as long as these meet the criteria set by the commission. Sports bodies that permit forms of discrimination based on gender, race, disability, religion, or creed are, for instance, not allowed.

A draft amendment bill (December 2019) proposed by the Department of Sports, Arts and Culture aims to strengthen the minister's regulatory control over sports codes (at local, provincial, or national levels), as well as clubs and fitness organisations. If accepted, a Sport Arbitration Tribunal will be created. The tribunal will determine the delegation of sporting powers and be tasked with resolving disputes between sports bodies. It will also regulate the fitness industry (registration and certification), establish procedures for bidding on and hosting international sports events, regulate combat sports, and determine offences and penalties (including imprisonment). Sports bodies would no longer operate independently but would promote their sports in consultation with the minister.

== The role of sport in the formation of a South African identity, post-Apartheid ==
Football has historically been particularly popular amongst persons of Indigenous African descent, although it does have a strong following amongst white South Africans as well and is South Africa's most popular sport overall. South Africa also hosted the 2010 FIFA World Cup.

The South Africa national rugby union team, which is nicknamed Springboks or the Bokke, are currently ranked no. 1 in the world in Rugby union, and have had multiple successful international and world cup campaigns. Rugby union is traditionally the most popular sport among white South Africans overall, with half of whites preferring it (cricket is a distant second, favored by 1 in 5 white South Africans). Today, rugby union is played and enjoyed amongst all races in South Africa. South Africa hosted the 1995 Rugby World Cup, the first in Africa, and won it as well.

Cricket is popular among the English-speaking white and Indian communities. However, it has garnered an exponential following amongst other races in recent years. The national cricket team is nicknamed The Proteas. South Africa hosted the 2003 ICC Cricket World Cup and 2007 ICC World Twenty20.

Other popular sports include: athletics, basketball, boxing, golf, netball, softball, field hockey, swimming, surfing and tennis.

=== Women's sport ===
Sport in South Africa is still primarily seen (in the words of a former member of Women and Sport South Africa) as "the domain of men". In 1997, one writer described "massive gender inequalities in the sporting structures of the country, and a strong association between sport and masculinity".

=== National teams and names ===
South Africa's national sporting colours are green, gold and white. The protea is the national emblem worn by South Africans representing their country in sport.

The national rugby union teams are nicknamed the "Springboks", while the national cricket teams are known as the "Proteas".

Sport	Men's	Women's
Australian rules football	Lions	n/a
Cricket	Proteas	Proteas
Soccer	Bafana Bafana	Banyana Banyana
Field hockey	AmaStokkie	South Africa women's national field hockey team
Mind Sports	MWEB Protea Team	MWEB Protea Team
Netball	n/a	SPAR Proteas
Rugby league	Rhinos	n/a
Rugby sevens	Blitzboks	Blitzbok Women
Rugby union	Springboks	Springbok Women
Water polo	Black Mamba	South Africa women's national water polo team
Ice Hockey	Rhinos	n/a

== Elite level team sports ==
=== Rugby union ===
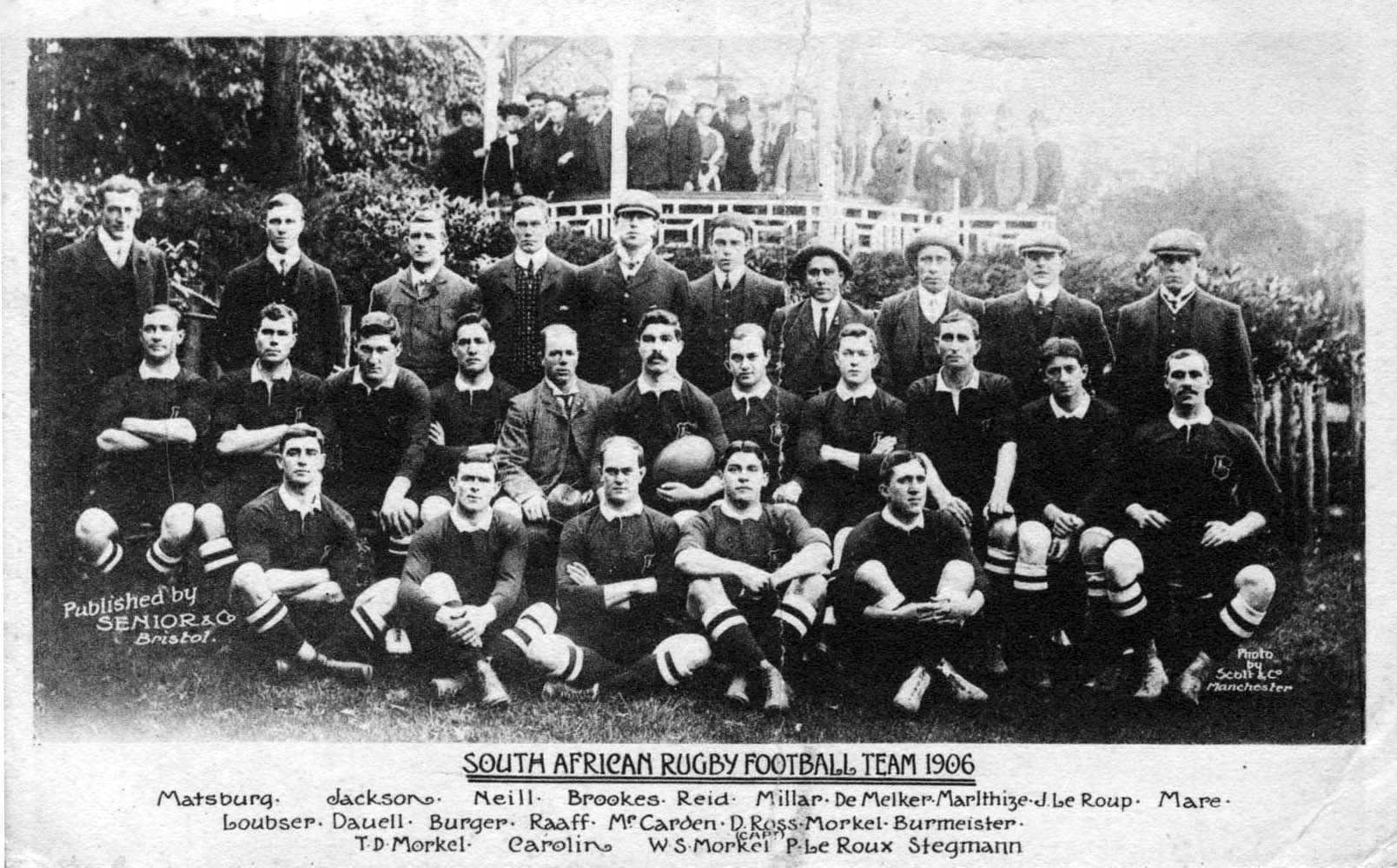
The 1906 Springboks team

Rugby union is the most popular team sport among white South Africans but has, in recent years, garnered a dedicated following among other ethnic groups. The national team is known as the Springboks. South Africa hosted and won the 1995 Rugby World Cup, marking its first appearance as it emerged from the isolation of the Apartheid era. The All Blacks' defeat in the final is remembered as one of the most famous South African sporting moments. The domestic league – the Currie Cup – is also played annually. From 1996, South Africa fielded sides against teams from Australia and New Zealand in the Super Rugby competition. This was expanded to include teams from Argentina and Japan. Still, after the COVID-19 pandemic forced the competition to split into three, South Africa withdrew and joined the United Rugby Championship, competing against teams from Ireland, Scotland, Wales, and Italy. This new alignment to the Northern Hemisphere led to South Africa's inclusion in the European Rugby Champions Cup from 2022.

After being tainted by associations with Apartheid, the Springboks (or 'Boks') have sought to become part of the 'New South Africa', with President Nelson Mandela wearing the Springbok jersey, once only worn by white South Africans, at the final of the 1995 Rugby World Cup.

South Africa has won the Rugby World Cup four times: in 1995, 2007, 2019, and 2023, making it the only country in the world to do so.

==== Rugby sevens ====
The South Africa national rugby sevens team (known as the Blitzbokke) compete in the World Rugby Sevens Series, the Rugby World Cup Sevens, the Summer Olympic Games, and the Commonwealth Games. They won the bronze medal at the 2016 Olympic Games and the silver medal at the 1997 Rugby World Cup Sevens. They have won the Commonwealth Games tournament twice in 2014 and 2022. As of 2024, South Africa has won the Sevens World Series four times. The South Africa Sevens is an annual tournament held in Cape Town as the South African leg of the Sevens World Series.

=== Association football ===
Soccer, as the sport is most commonly known in South Africa, is the most popular team sport amongst all South Africans.

South Africa hosted the 2010 FIFA World Cup, becoming the first African nation to host the tournament.

Bafana Bafana, as hosts of the 2010 FIFA World Cup, were drawn in Group A with Mexico, Uruguay and France, they played their first match against Mexico which ended in a 1–1 draw in Johannesburg. They played their second match against Uruguay and the match ended in a 3–0 defeat in Pretoria, their last match was against France in Bloemfontein which South Africa needed more goals to advance to the knockout stages but the match ended in a 2–1 win that was not enough for them to progress to the knockout stages, thereby becoming the first host nation to exit at the group stage in history of World Cup. After the World Cup, the team continues to struggle, having missed the 2014, 2018 and 2022 FIFA World Cups, but qualified for the 2026 edition of the tournament.

The team has made four appearances in the FIFA World Cup; 1998, 2002, 2010, and 2026, and, as of 2025, has made 12 appearances in the Africa Cup of Nations. Their best result was at the 1996 tournament, when, as hosts, they won the tournament.

Mamelodi Sundowns is the most successful team in the South African Premiership era, boasting the most appearances in the CAF Champions League (Champions in 2016), Africa Football League (inaugural winners in 2023) and in the FIFA Club World Cup (2016, 2025). Other popular teams include Orlando Pirates and Kaizer Chiefs, often referred to as the Soweto rivals. The domestic cups are the MTN 8, Black Label Cup, and Nedbank Cup, while the international cups are CAF Champions League and CAF Confederation Cup. The sport's governing body is SAFA.

=== Cricket ===
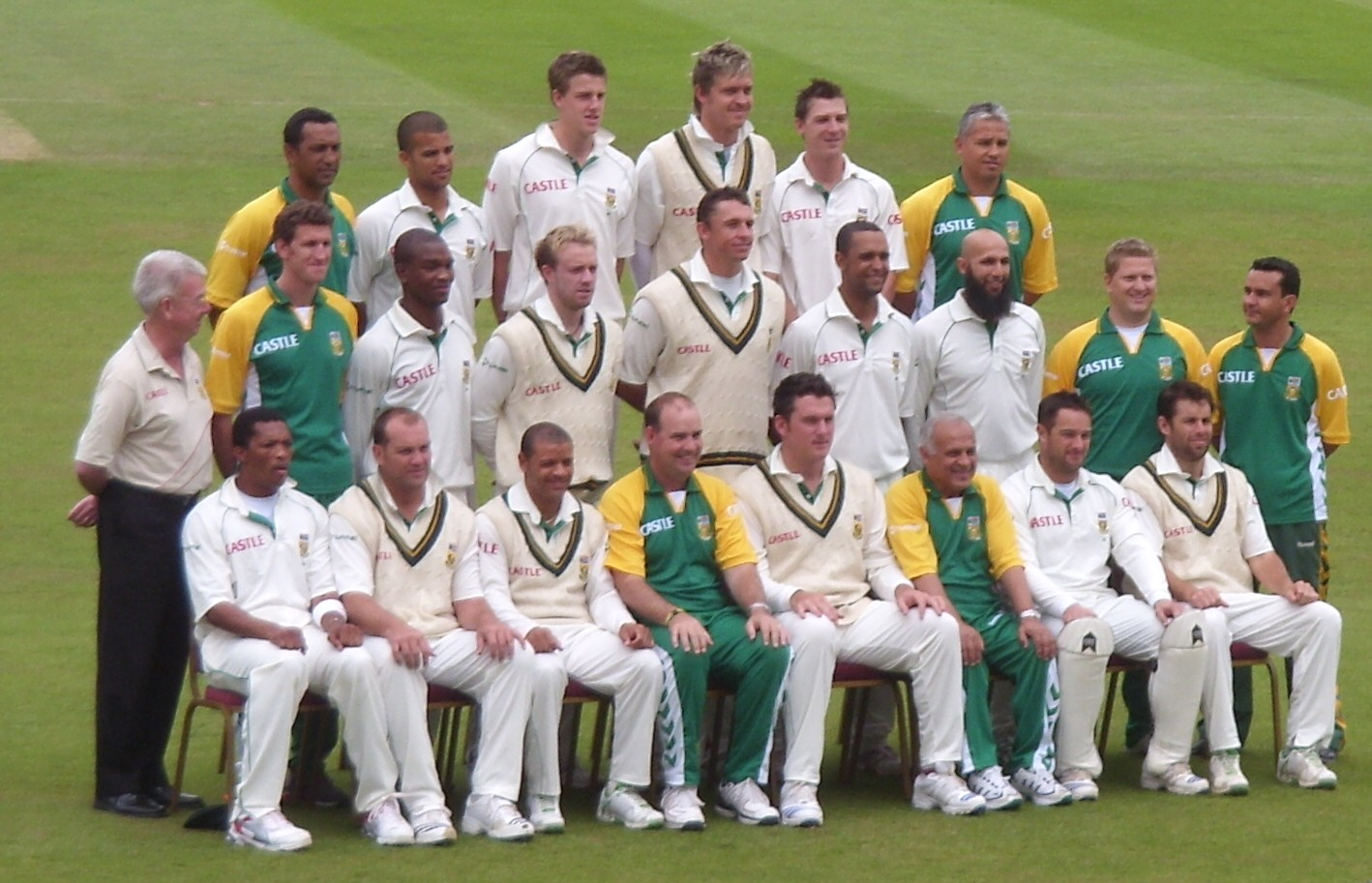
The Proteas at The Oval in August 2008

Cricket is one of the most popular team sports in South Africa. The national team is known as the Proteas.

South Africa is one of the leading cricket-playing nations in the world and one of the twelve countries sanctioned to play test cricket, and won the 2023–2025 World Test Championship.

During apartheid, cricket was popular among English-speaking whites and the Asian (subcontinent) community. However, the latter were unable to compete at the highest level in South African cricket during the apartheid era. Since the end of the apartheid era, a higher proportion of white players have come from Afrikaans-speaking backgrounds, and attempts have been made to increase the number of non-white players, in part through a quota system.

The team has had success with batters like Herschelle Gibbs, who was one of the sport's most dominating batsmen, all-rounders like Jacques Kallis and Shaun Pollock, the former being one of the greatest all rounders of the game, and bowlers such as Makhaya Ntini, who reached number two in the ICC Player Rankings in 2006. Dale Steyn was ranked as one of the best test bowlers, and former captain Graeme Smith was one of the most dominant left-handed batsmen in recent world cricket history. Wicketkeeper Mark Boucher has the world record for the most dismissals for a wicketkeeper in Tests. In 2006 in Johannesburg, in what was the highest scoring 50 over ODI ever, South Africa led by Gibbs' 175 chased down Australia's mammoth and then world record score of 434–4. South Africa hosted the 2003 Cricket World Cup, an event that was disappointing for them, as they tied against Sri Lanka in what proved to be a farcical situation and were eliminated on home soil. In the 2007 Cricket World Cup, South Africa reached the semi-finals but lost to Australia. New Zealand eliminated them in the 2011 Cricket World Cup, and the same team also defeated them in the 2015 Cricket World Cup in a thrilling semi-final.

=== Field hockey ===
Major events: Hockey Africa Cup of Nations, Hockey World Cup and Women's Hockey World Cup

Field hockey in South Africa has been played for decades, mainly by the white minority. Like most other sports, South Africa was banned from international Hockey from 1964 onwards. In August 1992, the South African Hockey Association was formed, with the aims of "Creat[ing] opportunities for participation without distinction based on colour, race, creed, religion or gender" and to "Redress historical disparities to allow all to participate and compete equally and specifically address the needs of historically disadvantaged communities through special programmes." As a result, South Africa was allowed to take part in international competitions from 1993 onwards, including the Hockey Africa Cup of Nations, a trophy that has been won every time since by both the South African Men's Hockey team and the South African Women's Hockey team.

At the national level, the primary competition in South Africa is the Premier Hockey League. This consists of two leagues: One for men and one for women, each with six teams. The men's teams are the Addo Elephants, Drakensberg Dragons, Garden Route Gazelles, Golden Gate Gladiators, Mapungubwe Mambas and the Maropeng Cavemen. The women's teams are the Blyde River Bunters, Madikwe Rangers, Namaqualand Daisies, Orange River Rafters, St. Lucia Lakers and the Wineland Wings. The Golden Gate Gladiators and the Namaqualand Daisies are the South African national U21 men's and women's teams, respectively. The teams played each other in a round-robin tournament, and the bottom two teams were eliminated (and then played each other to determine 5th and 6th place). The top four teams played in two semi-finals: the 1st against the 3rd and the 2nd against the 4th. The winners of each semi-final then play each other in the final (and the losers play each other for 3rd and 4th place). The league usually plays over four weekends from late November to mid-December.

On the world stage, the men's team has qualified for the Olympics four times, with the highest placing 10th (2004). They've also qualified for the Hockey World Cup seven times, highest placing 10th (1994 and 2010). The women's team has qualified for the Olympics four times, with the highest placement 9th (2004), and for the Women's Hockey World Cup six times, with the highest placement 7th (1998).

South Africa's Men's and Women's teams are both members of the African Hockey Federation, the governing body for Hockey in Africa, and the International Hockey Federation.

== Other team sports ==
=== Australian rules football ===
Australian rules football is a minor sport in South Africa. South Africa has a national team, the South Africa national Australian rules football team. In 2007, the team competed against Australia's best Under-17 players and defeated a touring Australian amateur senior team for the first time. There are annual national championships, first held in 2008. The South African national team also competes in the Australian Football International Cup, a World Cup for all countries except Australia, the only place where the sport is played professionally. The South African national team's highest finish at the International Cup was third, in 2008.

=== Baseball ===
Baseball was introduced to South Africa by Americans who settled in the Transvaal province at the turn of the 20th century. South Africa is the leading team in Africa in both baseball and Baseball5.

=== Basketball ===
Basketball is an increasingly popular sport in South Africa, especially amongst the youth. The national federation Basketball South Africa was founded in 1992 and is one of the youngest members of the global basketball governing body FIBA. The national team competes at the FIBA Africa Championship.

So far, no basketball player of South African nationality has made it to the NBA. However, South Africa was the birthplace to Steve Nash, two-time MVP in the NBA, and Swiss NBA player Thabo Sefolosha has a South African father.

=== Beach volleyball ===
South Africa featured a men's national team in beach volleyball that competed at the 2018–2020 CAVB Beach Volleyball Continental Cup.

=== Korfball ===
The Dutch sport of korfball is administered by the South African Korfball Federation, which manages the South Africa national korfball team. The 2019 IKF World Korfball Championship was held in August 2019 in Durban, South Africa.

=== Lacrosse ===
In April 2021, South Africa became the 69th member of the rapidly expanding international lacrosse federation. South Africa became the fourth African country to do so. In 2007, a group of volunteers established the South African Lacrosse Project (SALP), which introduced thousands of young people to lacrosse, particularly in smaller villages in the Limpopo Province north of Johannesburg that lack the same sport offerings of many major cities.

=== Rugby league ===
Rugby league is largely unknown in South Africa; there is a national team (the South African Rhinos) and a small domestic competition.

The national team dates back to the early 60s and have featured in 2 World Cups, the 1995 Rugby League World Cup and the 2000 Rugby League World Cup.

There are currently three competitions: the top-level Rhino Cup, comprising 8 teams; the Protea Cup, comprising 4; and the Western Province Rugby League, comprising 5.

== Elite level individual sports ==
=== Athletics (track and field) ===
Major events: Comrades Marathon and Two Oceans Marathon

South Africa has an active athletics schedule and has produced numerous athletes who compete internationally and qualify for the Olympic and Paralympic Games. At the 2011 World Championships in Athletics in Daegu, South Korea, the relay team of Shane Victor, Ofentse Mogawane, Willem de Beer and Oscar Pistorius set a national record time of 2:59.21 seconds in the heats. South Africa went on to win a silver medal in the finals with the team of Victor, Mogawane, de Beer, and L. J. van Zyl.

In 2012, Caster Semenya won a gold medal in the women's 800m of the 2012 Olympic Games in London, with a time of 1:57.23 seconds. In 2012, Oscar Pistorius became the first double-amputee sprinter to compete at the Olympic Games, but did not win a medal.

Pistorius won a gold medal and a bronze medal in the T44 class at the 2004 Summer Paralympics in Athens, and three gold medals at the 2008 Summer Paralympic Games in Beijing. He also won two gold medals at the 2012 Paralympic Games and remained the T43 world record holder for the 200 and 400 metres events. The South African team of Pistorius, Arnu Fourie, Zivan Smith, and Samkelo Radebe won a gold medal and set a Paralympic record in the 4 × 100 m relay with a time of 41.78 seconds. Fourie also set a world record in the heats of the T44 200m event and won a bronze medal in the 100m event.

In 2016, Wayde van Niekerk won a gold medal in the men's 400m of the 2016 Olympic Games in Rio. He also broke the world record at the same race with a time of 43.03 seconds. He also holds the world-best time in the 300 metres.

=== Boxing ===
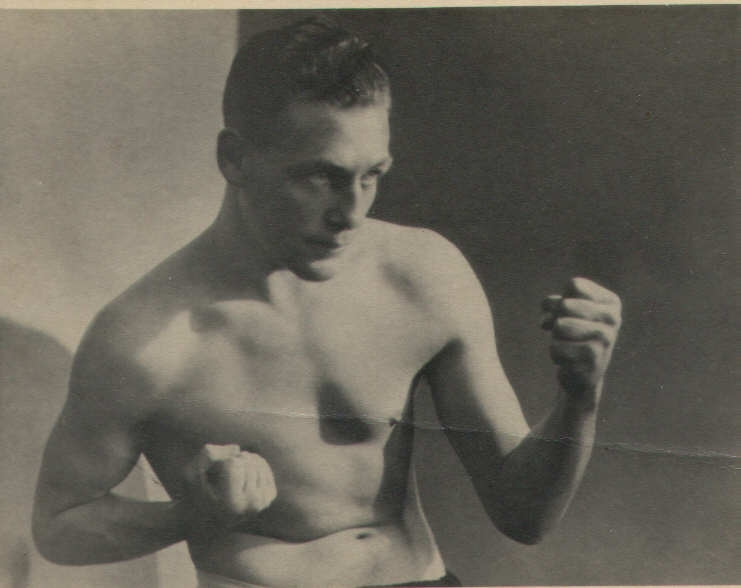
Willie Smith, circa 1920s

As of March 2012, when Jeffrey Mathebula won the IBF junior featherweight title, South Africa had produced 71 world champions since Willie Smith won the British version of the world bantamweight title. (Note: While it continues to be much-disputed, Herb Goldman who was the editor of The RING Record Book has decided that Willie Smith had indeed earned it.) As of July 8, 2022, South Africa has produced 130 world champions. In addition to the universally recognised world champion Vic Toweel, the number contains champions recognised by the major and nonmajor sanctioning bodies, and 71 world champions have won one hundred and fourteen titles including thirty-five titles for the four major sanctioning bodies (WBA, WBC, IBO, IBF and WBO). South Africa had eight world champions in 1998.

However, according to Jeffrey Mathebula's trainer Nick Durandt who has trained world champions such as Thulani Malinga and Phillip N'dou in his 25-year career, South Africa had not been able to host the world title bouts due to lack of funds, and boxers had been forced to fight overseas for world titles. The Gauteng sports department has been cooperative, but sponsorship and television coverage significantly dropped in thirty years. Boxing matches had not been broadcast on the state-owned broadcaster SABC from early 2011, and only a few cards had been aired on the satellite pay-TV platform SuperSport. Durandt had also mentioned that it is almost impossible to hold fights including world title bouts without SABC's support in their own country. Under such a background, as a result of the efforts of Branco Sports Promotions' Branco Milenkovic and others, it was decided that the IBF junior featherweight title bout between Takalani Ndlovu and Mathebula would be televised on SABC at the last minute. "We support the muted multi-lateral agreement involving the South African Broadcasting Corporation (SABC), SuperSport and the BSA [Boxing South Africa] on broadcasting rights," Sports Minister Fikile Mbalula stated in March 2013. However, after Simpiwe Vetyeka won the world title in December of that year, Bongani Mwelase told that Vetyeka came home to receive an "ice-cold welcome" from the local media. "Nothing is motivating if you really look at how boxing is treated here," he said. Hekkie Budler has held world championships in two weight classes, including the World Boxing Association (WBA) and International Boxing Organization (IBO) minimumweight titles between 2011 and 2016, and the unified WBA (Super), International Boxing Federation (IBF), and Ring magazine light-flyweight titles in 2018. Sivenathi Nontshinga is a two-time IBF light-flyweight champion and was ranked as the fifth best light-flyweight in the world in 2020.

=== Cycling ===
Major events: Cape Argus Cycle Race and 94.7 Cycle Challenge

South Africa has a strong cycle race scene. The most notable cyclist is Robert Hunter, who won a stage in the 2007 Tour de France. Robert Hunter rode that tour with Team Barloworld, who had gained a wildcard entry to the Tour de France that year. Barloworld was a UK-registered team with a management team composed mainly of Italians and a South African sponsor, and it included several African riders. In 2015, it was announced that the South African MTN-Qhubeka squad would become the first African-registered team to compete at the Tour. The team made an impact at the tour, with Daniel Teklehaimanot spending several days in the polka dot jersey and Steve Cummings winning the fourteenth stage of the race on Mandela Day. The team, under the new name of Team Dimension Data, was granted a UCI WorldTeam licence in 2016, becoming the first African team in the sport's top division. In the 2016 Tour de France the team won five stages through Cummings and Mark Cavendish, the latter also wearing the yellow jersey.

Cycling South Africa or CyclingSA is the national governing body of cycling in South Africa.

Another South African, Greg Minnaar, is a 4-time downhill mountain bike world champion in 2003, 2012, 2013, and 2021, with his win in 2021 making him the oldest ever world champion in downhill history at the age of 39. 2 On top of this, he has 4 second places and 3 third places in the world championships.

At the 2013 Tour de France, Daryl Impey became the first African cyclist to wear the yellow jersey as race leader, which he held for two stages. Louis Meintjes took the best overall result for an African rider at a Grand Tour when he finished 10th at the 2015 Vuelta a España, before he finished in the top 10 in the 2016 Tour de France, another first for an African rider.

=== Horseriding ===
South Africa hosts the Saddle Seat World Cup every four years, which includes the American Saddlebred, Morgan horse, and South African Boerperd horse breeds. It is the highest level of competition for Saddle seat Equitation riders.

=== Golf ===
South Africa is one of the major golfing nations.

The first South African to win a major championship was Bobby Locke, who won The British Open four times in 1949, 1950, 1952, and 1957. Also, he claimed nine wins at the South African Open, seven at the South Africa Professional, and 11 at the Transvaal Open, for a total of 74 professional wins.

The most famous South African golfer is, however, Gary Player, who, along with Arnold Palmer and Jack Nicklaus, dominated world golf for much of the 1960s and 1970s. Player won all four majors, winning the British Open in 1959, 1968 and 1974, The Masters in 1961, 1974 and 1978, the PGA Championship in 1962 and 1972 and the U.S Open just once in 1965. Player always wore his trademark black outfits and became one of the sport's most recognisable figures. He also enjoyed considerable success in senior golf, winning six majors on the Champions Tour (then the Senior PGA Tour) from 1986 to 1990. The only other South African to have won a senior major is Simon Hobday, winner of the U.S. Senior Open in 1994.

Current players who have won majors are 1994, 1997 U.S. Open and 2002 British Open Champion Ernie Els, 2001 and 2004 U.S. Open Champion Retief Goosen, 2008 Masters Champion Trevor Immelman, British Open Champion Louis Oosthuizen and 2011 Masters Champion Charl Schwartzel. Other notable players include Tim Clark, who has two Nationwide Tour wins and won the 2010 PGA Players Championship.

The country has had less success in women's golf. The only South African woman to have won a major was Sally Little, who won the LPGA Championship in 1980. Little later became a U.S. citizen and won a second major, the 1988 du Maurier Classic, as an American.

The Sunshine Tour is based in South Africa but has a few events in other African countries. Several tournaments have been sanctioned by the European Tour since the 1990s:

- South African PGA Championship (1995–1999)
- FNB Players Championship (1996)
- Dimension Data Pro-Am (1996–1997)
- South African Open (1997–present)
- Alfred Dunhill Championship (1990–present)
- Joburg Open (2007–present)
- Africa Open (2010–present)
- Nelson Mandela Championship (2012–2013)
- Volvo Golf Champions (2012–2014)
- Tshwane Open (2013–present)
- Nedbank Golf Challenge (2013–present)

Also, the South African Women's Open was part of the Ladies European Tour from 2012 to 2014. South Africa has hosted the 2003 Presidents Cup and the Women's World Cup of Golf from 2005 to 2008.

=== Mixed martial arts ===
South Africa host Extreme Fighting Championship (formerly known as EFC Africa). It is the number 1 mixed martial arts organisation in the African continent.

EFC Africa 01 took place at The Coca-Cola Dome in Northgate, Johannesburg, on 10 November 2009 and is now available for viewing in 110 countries, including the United States, Canada, the Caribbean and across Europe. EFC Africa 19, which was held at Carnival City in Johannesburg on 19 April 2013, topped other African sports ratings with a record of over 1.8 million views with 31.3% of the total South African TV audience (SABC, e.tv and DStv combined). These are the biggest ratings in EFC history, topping EFC Africa 12's record of 1.6 million views and 25.9% audience share.

On 19 June 2004, Cape Town's Trevor Prangley made his UFC debut. He defeated Curtis Stout by submission via cobra choke in round 2 at UFC 48. His last fight in the UFC was against Chael Sonnen, whom he had previously submitted by armbar in round 1 before they both entered the UFC. Sonnen defeated him by unanimous decision at UFC Ultimate Fight Night 4. His record in the UFC was 2-2.

United Kingdom-based South African fighter Fraser Opie competed on The Ultimate Fighter: Team Jones vs. Team Sonnen, season 17 of the UFC's reality television show. He lost to Clint Hester in the preliminary round via unanimous decision. Fraser signed with EFC after competing on the show. He beat Egypt's Mohamad Ali via TKO in round 1 on his EFC debut at EFC 22, then lost to then-defending champion Gideon Drotshie for the EFC Light Heavyweight Title via TKO in round 2 at EFC 25, and then lost to Tumelo Maphutha via submission from punches in round 1 at EFC 27. Opie was scheduled to fight Pete Motaung at EFC 34 but was removed from the card due to a dispute over travel arrangements, according to Opie, and was replaced by former opponent Tumelo Maphutha. While EFC appears to have refused a previously agreed direct flight for Fraser, the agreement seems to have fallen through, with EFC offering only indirect flights with a connecting flight that would increase the overall travel time, which Opie suggested is not possible due to his demanding weight cut. As a result, Fraser Opie was cut from EFC.

In February 2014, EFC Heavyweight Champion Ruan Potts signed with the UFC. He fought Soa Palelei at UFC Fight Night 40 at U.S. Bank Arena in Cincinnati, Ohio on 10 May 2014 on his UFC debut. He lost via first-round KO. His next fight was at UFC 177 Prelims on 30 August 2014 at The Sleep Train Arena in Sacramento, California against Anthony Hamilton. He lost in round 2 via TKO due to continuous body shots.

In December 2014, the UFC signed EFC Middleweight Champion Garreth McLellan. He made his debut on 11 April 2015 at UFC Fight Night: Gonzaga vs Cro Cop 2 in Kraków, Poland. He was initially scheduled to fight Poland's Krzysztof Jotko. Jotko pulled out of the fight. He fought another Polishman, Bartosz Fabinski. He lost via unanimous decision (30-27, 30-27, 30-27). At UFC Fight Night: Holohan vs. Smolka in Dublin, Ireland, on 24 October 2015, McLellan earned his first UFC win against Bubba Bush. McLellan finished Bush with a second to go via TKO in round 3.

In January 2015, EFC President Cairo Howarth announced the opening of the EFC Women's Flyweight Division. The first EFC women's fight took place at EFC 37 on 21 February at Carnival City in Johannesburg. Johannesburg's own Danella Eliasov fought Hungary's Zita Varju. Eliasov won via TKO in round 1. Their first Women's Flyweight Champion was crowned at EFC 60 when Amanda Lino defeated Jaqualine Trosse in a rematch by armbar in round 2. The Inaugural title fight was scheduled for EFC 54 between Amanda Lino and Shana Power, but Shana couldn't make weight and was not medically cleared to compete. Jaqualine Trosse and Shana Power fought at EFC 56. Trosse won the fight by unanimous decision and was awarded the bout against Lino for the vacant title at EFC 60, which she lost.

EFC Flyweight Champion, Nkazimulo Zulu, competed in The Ultimate Fighter: Tournament of Champions. The winner was set to fight Demetrious Johnson for the UFC Flyweight Championship. He fought Japan's Hiromasa Ogikubo in the first round of the tournament. He lost via submission due to a rear-naked choke in round 2.

UFC signed fighter Dricus du Plessis is the current middleweight champion, having won all 8 of his fights in the division. Another South African, Cameron Saaiman, has won 3 of his UFC bantamweight fights, losing one by decision and another by TKO.

=== Motorsports ===
South Africa has hosted the Formula One Grand Prix, the most recent being the 1993 race at the Kyalami circuit. It has produced the 1979 Formula One world champion, Jody Schekter, who triumphed for Ferrari that year. South Africa was also one of the host nations for the A1 Grand Prix.

Former IndyCar Series driver and son of Jody, Tomas Scheckter, led the most laps in both his first two Indianapolis 500 starts. Which was 85 laps during the 2002 Indianapolis 500 and 63 laps during the 2003 Indianapolis 500. He has two career IndyCar victories. He has driven full-time for Cheever Racing in 2002, Chip Ganassi Racing in 2003, Panther Racing in 2004 and 2005 and Vision Racing in 2006 and 2007. He also drove for Luczo Dragon Racing, Dreyer & Reinbold Racing, and other teams part-time until 2011.

Motor rallying and off-road (4x4) racing are also widely popular and practiced in South Africa. The 2009 Dakar Rally was won by South African Giniel de Villiers in a Volkswagen Touareg.

Brothers Brad Binder and Darryn Binder are well-known competitors in Grand Prix motorcycle racing.

=== Swimming ===
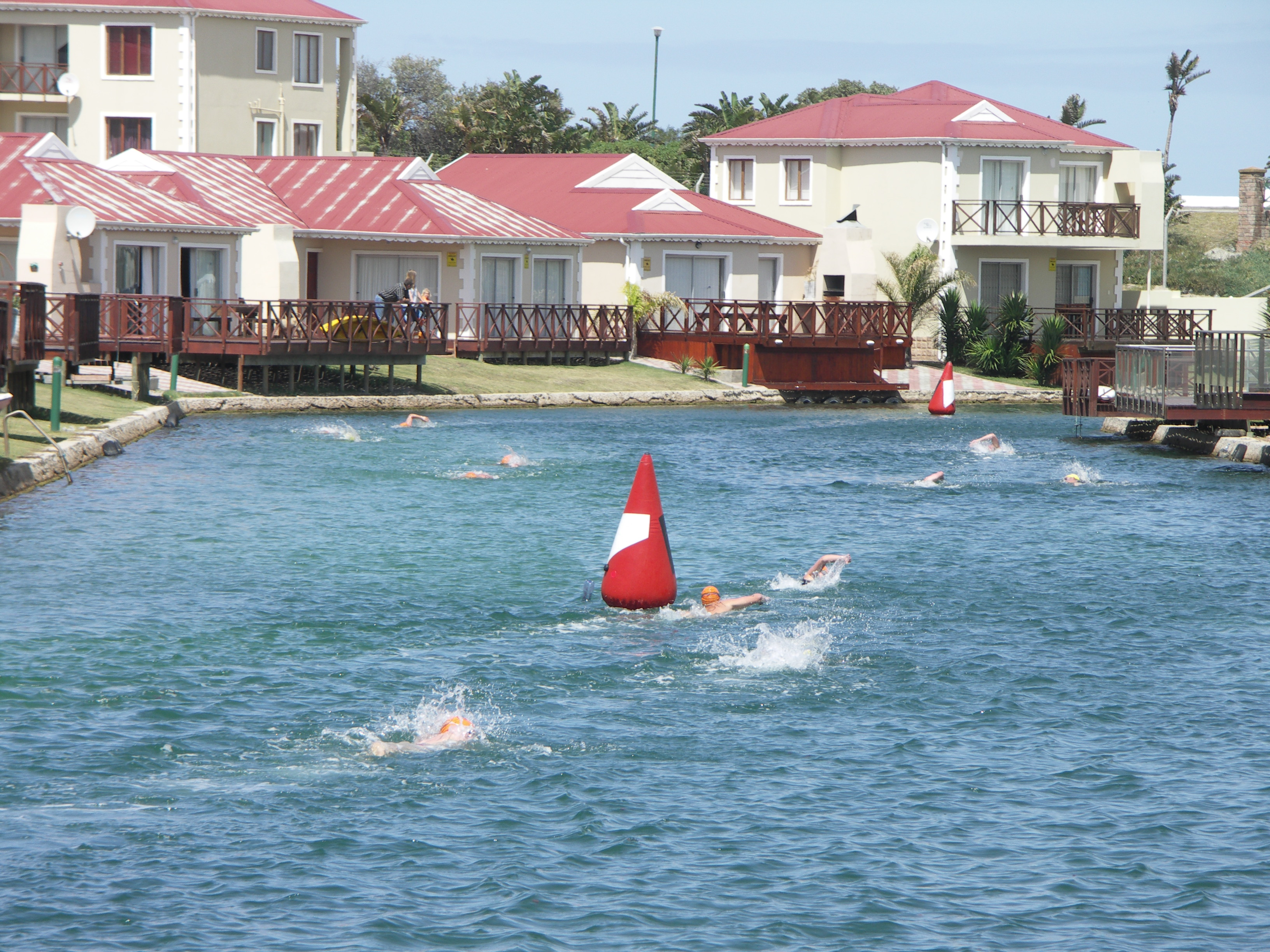
Eastern Cape Open Water event at Marina Martinique

Major events: Midmar Mile

The aQuelle Ocean Racing Series is Africa's largest beach event with a 400m ocean swim, 1 km, 2 km, and 3 km Ocean Swims available on mostly alternate Sunday mornings throughout Summer in Nelson Mandela Bay (Port Elizabeth) and hosted by local non-profit sports events company Zsports Events NPC. The Nelson Mandela Bay River Mile (river mile) is Africa's oldest open-water swimming event, having started in 1924, and is held annually in Nelson Mandela Bay in mid-February.

=== Tennis ===
South African players won the 1974 Davis Cup, albeit only by default, as India refused to travel to South Africa to compete in the final because of the apartheid regime. South Africa was banned from the competition in 1979 and did not re-enter until 1995.

Johan Kriek won the Australian Open final in 1981 (South Africa's only Grand Slam victory to date), before becoming a US citizen in 1982. Kevin Curren reached the Australian Open final in 1984, losing to Mats Wilander, before naturalising as a US citizen in 1985. Other South African Grand Slam finalists include Brian Norton (1921), Irene Bowder Peacock (1927), Eric Sturgess (1947, 1948 & 1951), Ian Vermaak (1959), Sandra Reynolds (1960), Cliff Drysdale (1965) and Kevin Anderson (2017, 2018). The most recent tennis players to enter the world top ten rankings are Wayne Ferreira, Amanda Coetzer, and Kevin Anderson.

The South African Open was part of the Grand Prix from 1972 to 1989 and the ATP Tour from 1990 to 2011.

== Other individual sports ==
=== Canoeing ===
Several large canoe events occur annually in South Africa:

- Dusi Canoe Marathon
- Fish River Canoe Marathon
- Berg River Canoe Marathon

=== Obstacle course racing ===
SA OCR is a not-for-profit company aiming to help grow the sport and provide a means of financial support for athletes wanting to travel to compete internationally. With the OCR World Championships running for 3 consecutive years now as well as some of the larger local race series like The Warrior Race which have been around for almost 4 years the sport is growing with events reaching nearly 9000 participants on a weekend. The sport involves running, typically around 12 km, with varying numbers of obstacles interspersed along the course.

=== Sailing ===
South African Sailing is the national governing body for the sport of sailing in South Africa, recognised by the International Sailing Federation. Commonly sailed boats include the GP14, 29er, Flying Fifteen, and ILCA. South African sailors have competed sporadically at the Olympic Games since 1924 when Rupert Ellis-Brown competed in the monotype competition.

=== Surfing ===
Surfing is widely practiced around major coastal cities, such as Cape Town and Durban.

=== Triathlon ===
In triathlon, Henri Schoeman is an Olympic bronze medallist, finishing third at the 2016 Summer Olympics in Rio. Conrad Stoltz is a three-time Xterra Triathlon world champion, Raynard Tissink is a multiple Ironman champion, Hendrick de Villiers is an ITU World Cup winner, Richard Murray is an ITU World Triathlon Series race winner and Dan Hugo is an Xterra and multi-sport star. Port Elizabeth hosts a half-ironman distance event, the PEople's Triathlon (website), in September each year, which features a 2 km ocean swim, 90 km cycle, and 21 km run.

== Parasports ==
South Africa has several disabled athletes, most notably Oscar Pistorius, the double amputee world record holder at 200 and 400 metres; and swimmer Natalie du Toit, who became the first amputee to compete in swimming at the (able-bodied) Olympics in 2008.

== Traditional sports ==
- Jukskei is a 200-year-old folk sport developed and played in South Africa.
- Morabaraba promoted by Mind Sports South Africa.

== Major sports facilities ==
=== National stadiums ===
- FNB Stadium (South Africa national football team) in Johannesburg has a capacity of 94,736 and hosted the final of the 2010 FIFA World Cup.
- Ellis Park Stadium (South Africa national rugby team) in Johannesburg has a capacity of 62,567 and hosted the final of the 1995 Rugby World Cup.
- Wanderers Stadium (South Africa national cricket team) in Johannesburg has a capacity of 34,000 and hosted the final of the 2003 Cricket World Cup.

=== Golf courses ===
- The Royal Johannesburg & Kensington Golf Club has hosted the South African PGA Championship since 2005 and the Joburg Open since 2007
- Royal Cape Golf Club is the oldest golf club in Africa and was established in Cape Town in 1885.
- The Gary Player Country Club in Sun City hosts the annual Nedbank Golf Challenge.

=== Athletic stadiums ===
- Johannesburg Stadium has a capacity of 37,500 and hosted the eighth IAAF World Cup in Athletics in 1998 and most of the 1999 All-Africa Games.

== See also ==
- South Africa at the Olympics
- South Africa at the Paralympics
- South Africa at the Commonwealth Games
- Jarvis and Kaplan Cup
