= 2014 RLIF Awards =

The 2014 RLIF Awards were presented on Friday 19 December 2014, recognizing achievements in the sport of rugby league in the year of 2014.

The 2014 RLIF Awards were marked by inaugural awards ceremony and featured new awards, notably the Rugby League International Federation Player of the Year Award. Other awards included the Rookie of Year, for players who made their Test debut and were under 21 years of age in the awards year, the Nations’ International Players of the Year, selected by each nation's governing body from the 17 teams that were involved in significant international events and the Spirit of Rugby League, for those who have made significant contributions to the sport in their lifetime.

== Awards ==
- note awards are shown for the past seven years (including 2014).

For awards presented with nominees, winners are listed first and highlighted in boldface.

International Player of the Year	Coach of the Year
**Sam Burgess, South Sydney Rabbitohs, England**; Sonny Bill Williams, Sydney Roosters, New Zealand; Cameron Smith, Melbourne Storm, Queensland Maroons, Australia; Billy Slater, Melbourne Storm, Queensland Maroons, Australia; Todd Carney, Sydney Roosters, NSW Country, Australia; Jarryd Hayne, Parramatta Eels, New South Wales Blues, Australia; Billy Slater, Melbourne Storm, Queensland Maroons, Australia	**Michael McGuire, South Sydney Rabbitohs**; Trent Robinson, Sydney Roosters; Craig Bellamy, Melbourne Storm; Des Hasler, Manly Sea Eagles; Wayne Bennett, Brisbane Broncos; Craig Bellamy, Melbourne Storm, New South Wales Blues; Des Hasler, Manly Sea Eagles
Referee of the Year	Rookie of the Year
Team of the Year	Nations' Player of the Year
	**Canada - Steve Piatek**; **Cook Islands - Dominique Peyroux**; **Fiji - Semi Radradra**; **France - Rémi Casty**; **Ireland - Liam Finn**; **Jamaica - Nathan Campbell**; **Lebanon - George Ndaira**; **Papua New Guinea - Israel Eliab**; **Russia - Kirill Kosharin**; **Samoa - David Fa'alogo**; **Scotland - Matty Russell**; **Serbia - Stefan Nedeljkovic**; **Tonga - Jason Taumalolo**; **Ukraine - Oleksandr Skorbach**; **United States - Joseph Paulo**; **Wales - Rhys Evans**
Spirit of Rugby League Award
**Peter Corcoran**; Maurice Oldroyd; David Oxley CBE, England; Ron McGregor, New Zealand; Ken Arthurson, Australia; Paul Barriere - France
