= Rugby league in South Africa =

- Country: South Africa
- Governing body: South African Rugby League
- National team: South Africa
- First played: 1950s

National competitions
- World Cup

Club competitions
- Rhino Cup; Protea Cup

Rugby league is a largely unknown team sport played in South Africa. There has been multiple attempts to establish the sport in the country throughout history. Today the sport is administered by the South African Rugby League.

The sport has long struggled in South Africa due to traditional schism dispute over professionalism in rugby league and the apartheid system objecting to racially desegregated teams. The sport today still lacks state funding due South African Sports Confederation and Olympic Committee not recognising the sport as separate to rugby union.

== History ==
Rugby League was first played in South Africa in the 1950s by foreign national sides playing exhibition matches, though it wasn't until 1962 when South Africa first adopted the sport. Two governing bodies, the National Rugby League (Note: Not to be confused with the Australian rugby league competition) and Rugby League South Africa, separately attempted to introduce the sport. These two bodies agreed to merge the following year due to pressure from the International Rugby League Board. The inaugural 1963 season saw nine teams compete and a tour of Australia and New Zealand by the newly formed national team. Despite this, further attempts to grow the sport were quashed by the apartheid regime in objection to black and coloured people playing as well as the traditional schism over professionalism in rugby league.

In the late 1980s, rugby league began to return on township levels, despite the sport still being banned under the apartheid era.

Apartheid ended in the early 1990s. In 1991 the South African Rugby Football League was established to promote amateur rugby league. In 1994, South African Rugby Union (the white governing body of rugby union in South Africa) and the South African Rugby Board (the black governing body of rugby union in South Africa) merged and lifted the ban on rugby league. South Africa made its Rugby League World Cup debut following the competition's reformation for the 1995 competition in which they finished last in their group. The country rejoined the International Rugby League Board in 1996. In 1998, a new and the current governing body, South African Rugby League (SARL), was founded for the professional game. SARL became a founding members of the newly reformed Rugby League International Federation, the sport's global governing body. Attempts were made to host the 1998 World Club Challenge between the British and Australian champions at Ellis Park in Johannesburg, however the tournament never occurred. South Africa again competed in the 2000 World Cup, though made no improvement on their 1995 campaign.

In 2011, SARL instituted a new constitution which saw the countries first national league since the apartheid bad – the Rhino Cup. A year later, South Africa bid to host the 2017 Rugby League World Cup. They lost out to a joint bid from Australia, New Zealand, and Papua New Guinea, though received formal praise for the country's development of the sport, particularly for the growth of their domestic game. July 2013, saw South African Students competed in the Students World Cup as part of the 2013 Festival of World Cups. The team finished fifth, their best world cup performances of any type to date.

In 2024, South Africa Rugby League bid to host the 2028 Women's and 2030 Men's Rugby League World Cup.

== Domestic competitions ==
South African Rugby League operates three domestic competition. The first division Rhino Cup was founded in 2011 with second division Protea Cup founded in 2013. A provincial competition, the Jan Prinsloo Cup, was founded in 2012.

== The national team ==
The South African national rugby league team is nicknamed "The Rhinos".

== Demographics ==
As in most countries, rugby league is a working class sport. This, coupled with South Africa's history of apartheid has resulted in rugby league (as well as football; also traditionally a working class sport) being more popular amongst the black population of South Africa. This is in contrast to rugby union, traditionally a middle class sport, being more popular amongst the white population. Since the end of apartheid, there has been increased integration across both codes. Geographically, rugby league is most popular in Gauteng.
