= South African Wrestling Federation =

Sports governing body in South Africa

- Sport: Amateur wrestling
- Jurisdiction: South Africa
- Abbreviation: SAWF
- Affiliation: United World Wrestling
- President: Sakkie Bosse
- Secretary: Jeanne-Marié Coetser

Official website
- www.wrestling.org.za
- (South Africa)

South African Wrestling Federation (SAWF) is the organization that governs amateur freestyle wrestling and Greco-Roman wrestling for men and women in South Africa. South African Wrestling Federation is affiliated to United World Wrestling (UWW) and is the national governing body of the sport. SAWF is also affiliated to SASCOC, and organizes national competitions such as the SAWF Presidents and Masters Championship.

== Wrestlers ==
First female wrestlers in South Africa 1996 Anita Joubert at the age of 25 and her sister Louise Joubert at the age of 15

== See also ==
- Sports in South Africa
