= South African Rugby League =

Sports governing body in South Africa

- Founded: 19 August 1998
- IRL affiliation: 1998
- MEA and APRL affiliation: 2012 and 2016 respectively
- Responsibility: South Africa
- Website: sarugbyleague.co.za

(South Africa)

The South African Rugby League is the governing body for the sport of rugby league football in South Africa. The Association was formed in 1998.

In 2011, South African Rugby League instituted a new constitution which saw the countries first national league since the apartheid ban – the Rhino Cup. A year later, South Africa bid to host the 2017 Rugby League World Cup. They lost out to a joint bid from Australia, New Zealand, and Papua New Guinea, though received formal praise for the country's development of the sport, particularly for the growth of their domestic game.

In 2024, South Africa Rugby League bid to host the 2028 Women's and 2030 Men's Rugby League World Cup. The body estimated a R4 billion boost to the South African economy by hosting the 2030 event. They also made an unsuccessful bid to host the 2025 World Series which would have been part of the qualification process for the 2026 World Cup.

In June 2026, South African Rugby League had its membership status of International Rugby League reclassified from Full Member to Affiliate Member.

== See also ==
- Rugby league in South Africa
- South Africa national rugby league team
