= Semi Radradra =

Fiji international dual-code rugby footballer

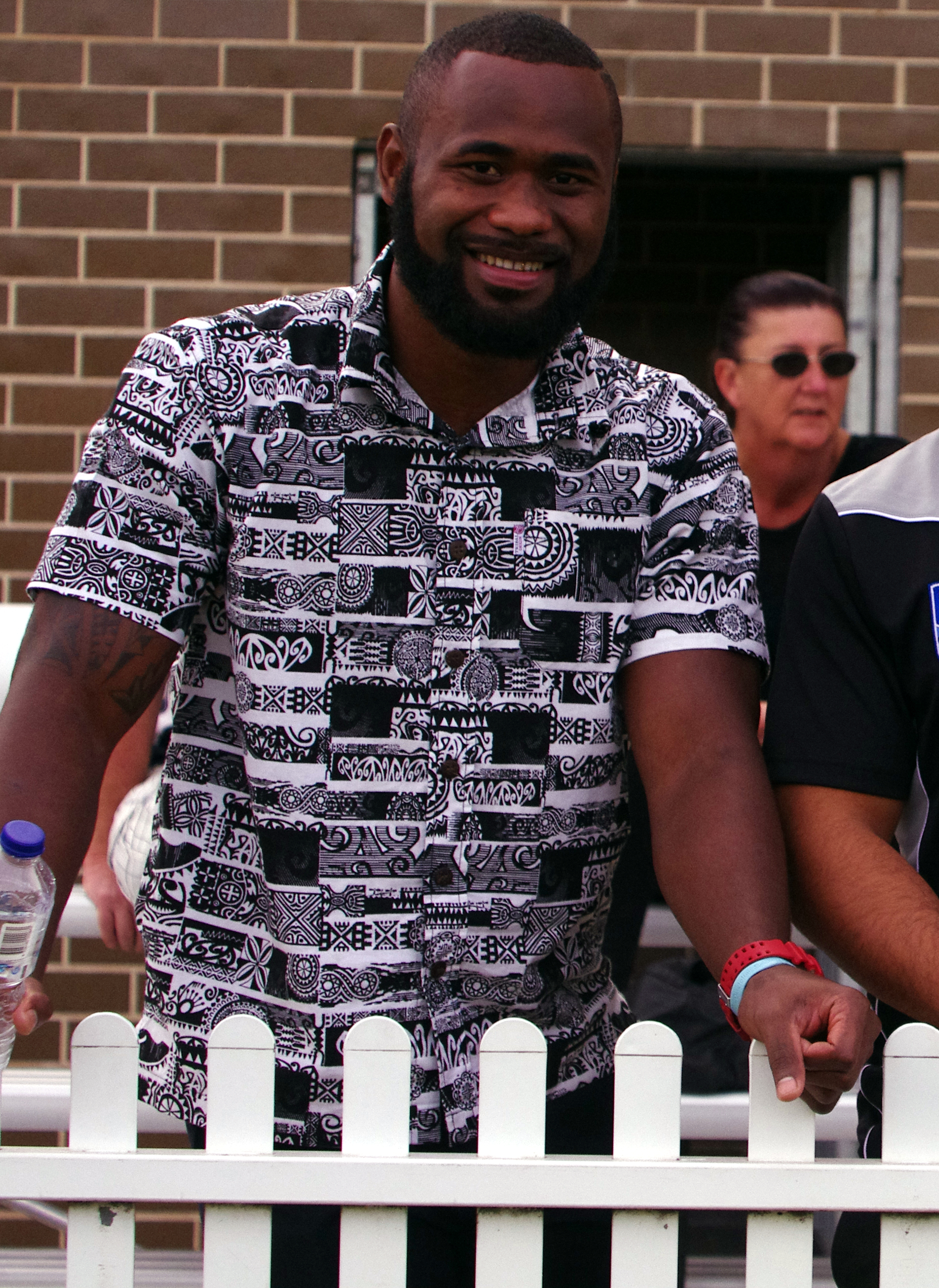

Personal information
- Full name: Semi Radradra Turagasoli-Waqavatu
- Born: 13 June 1992 (age 34) Suva, Fiji
- Height: 190 cm (6 ft 3 in)
- Weight: 100 kg (15 st 10 lb; 220 lb)

Playing information

Rugby league
- Position: Wing, Centre
Club
Years	Team	Pld	T	G	FG	P
2013–17	Parramatta Eels	94	82	1	0	330
Representative
Years	Team	Pld	T	G	FG	P
2013–14	Fiji	4	1	0	0	4
2016	World All Stars	1	1	0	0	4
2016	Australia	1	0	0	0	0
2016	Prime Minister's XIII	1	1	0	0	4

Rugby union
- Position: Centre, Wing, Fullback
Club
Years	Team	Pld	T	G	FG	P
2017–18	RC Toulon	23	4	0	0	20
2018–20	Bordeaux Bègles	34	11	0	0	55
2020–23	Bristol Bears	53	18	0	0	90
2023–25	Lyon	32	3	0	0	15
2025–	Shizuoka Blue Revs	15	6	0	0	30
	Total	157	42	0	0	210
Representative
Years	Team	Pld	T	G	FG	P
2011	Fiji U20	4	3	0	0	15
2011	Fiji 7s	15	9	2	0	49
2018–	Fiji	21	6	0	0	30
- Source: As of 24 June 2025
Medals
Men's rugby sevens
Representing Fiji
Summer Olympics
Gold medal – first place	2020 Tokyo	Team competition

Semi Radradra Turagasoli-Waqavatu (born 13 June 1992) is a Fijian professional rugby union and former rugby league footballer. He plays rugby union for the Japanese club Shizuoka Blue Revs and the Fiji national team. Nicknamed 'Semi Trailer', Radradra has played primarily as a winger in both codes.

He played for Fiji in sevens (rugby union) in 2011, then began his professional career playing rugby league for the Parramatta Eels in the National Rugby League. He played international rugby league for Fiji and Australia.

He changed codes from rugby league to rugby union when he transferred to French club Toulon in 2017, before moving to Bordeaux Bègles in 2018. He made his international debut for Fiji in 2018 and played in the 2019 Rugby World Cup. On 27 November 2019, it was announced he would be joining Bristol Bears ahead of the 2020/21 season. On 10 February 2023, Bristol Bears announced that Radradra would be leaving at the end of his three-year contract to join Lyon.

== Background ==
Radradra hails from the village of Somosomo in Taveuni. He played professional rugby union for the Vatukoula Rugby Union club, and was selected to represent the Fiji U20 team at the 2011 IRB Junior World Championship, playing at centre in four matches. Later the same year, Radradra represented the Fiji national rugby sevens team at the 2011 Dubai Sevens, where he was scouted by the Parramatta Eels.

== Rugby league ==
=== Early career ===
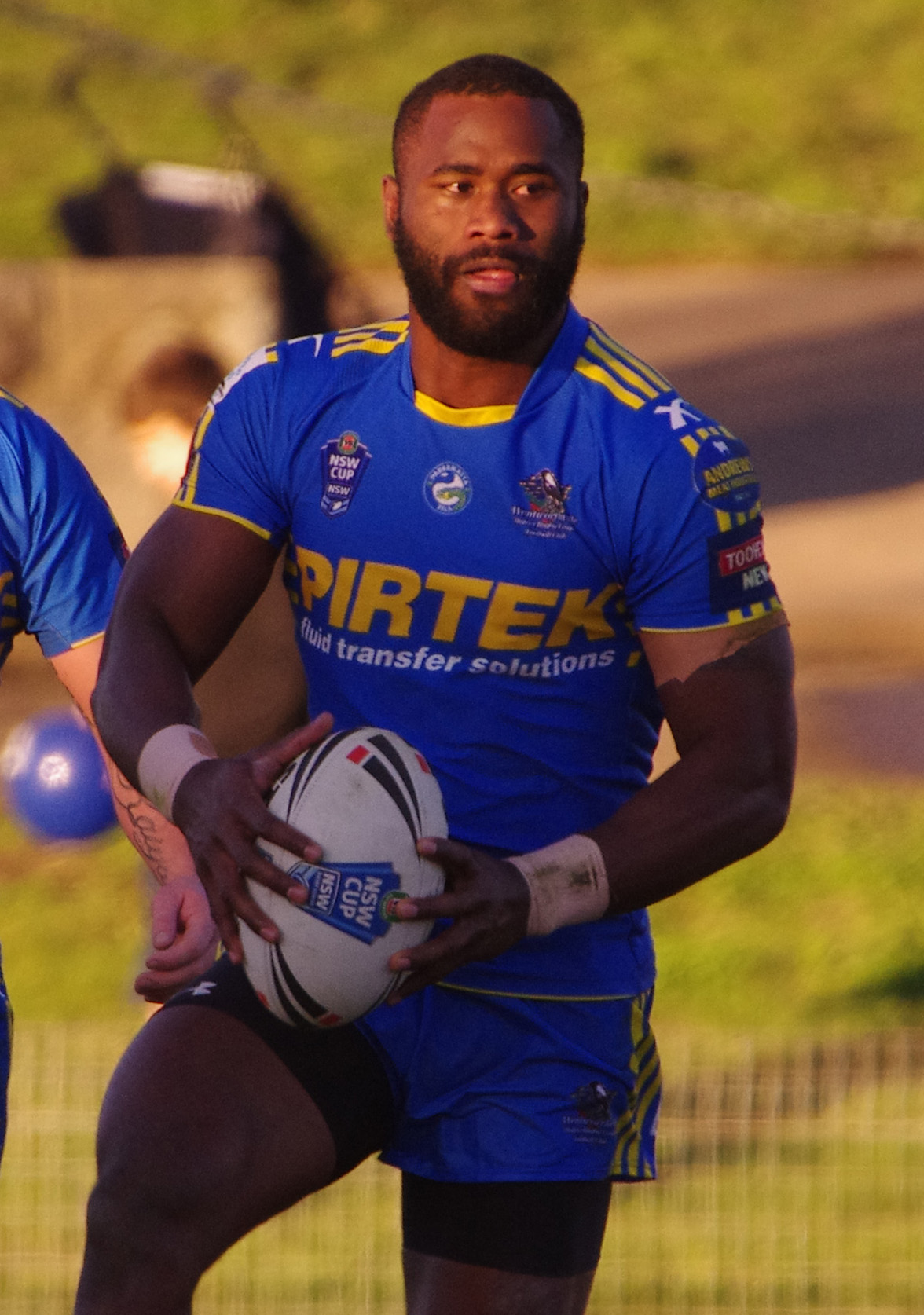
Radradra playing for the Wentworthville Magpies in 2013

Radradra played for the Parramatta Eels' NYC team in 2012 before moving on to their New South Wales Cup team, the Wentworthville Magpies.

=== 2013 ===
In round 18, Radradra made his NRL debut for the Eels against the Penrith Panthers on the wing in Parramatta's 10–17 loss at Parramatta Stadium. In round 20, against Canterbury-Bankstown, Radradra scored his first NRL try in Parramatta's 12–40 loss at ANZ Stadium. Radradra finished the 2013 season with five tries in seven appearances. Radradra was selected in the Fiji squad for the 2013 World Cup.

=== 2014 ===
In February, Radradra was selected in Parramatta's inaugural Auckland Nines squad and was the tournament's highest try scorer with five tries, alongside the North Queensland Cowboys' Kyle Feldt. In round 1, against the New Zealand Warriors, Radradra scored a hat-trick in Parramatta's 36–16 win at Parramatta Stadium, earning the nickname Semi-Trailer. In May, Radradra played for Fiji in the 2014 Pacific Test against Samoa at centre in the 16–32 loss. On 4 June, Radradra re-signed with the Parramatta club on a four-year contract worth $1 million until the end of the 2018 season. He was named 2014 Dally M Winger of the year. Radradra played in all of the Eels 24 matches and scored 19 tries. He was awarded the Fiji Bati International Player of the Year Award.

=== 2015 ===
At the start of the year, Radradra played for Parramatta in the 2015 Auckland Nines. In round 1, against the Manly Warringah Sea Eagles, he scored a hat-trick of tries in Parramatta's 42–12 win at Parramatta Stadium. Radradra was the first player to score consecutive hat-tricks in the first round of two separate NRL seasons. In round 17, against the West Tigers, he broke a 61-year-old record by becoming the first player to score two or more tries in five consecutive games when he scored his double in Parramatta's 28–16 win at ANZ Stadium. The previous record was held by Ray Preston. In the final round of the season against the Canberra Raiders, Radradra scored two tries in the Eels' golden-point 24–28 defeat to finish with 24 tries in 18 games, making him the top try-scorer of the season. This was a club record, surpassing Steve Ella's previous record of 23 tries. Radradra was named the Dally M Winger of the Year, for the second year in a row, and was named on the wing in the 2015 RLIF Team of the Year, the first Fijian player to do so.

=== 2016 ===
On 1 February 2016, Radradra again played in the Auckland Nines. On 13 February, he played for the World All Stars against the Indigenous All Stars in the 2016 All Stars match, playing on the wing and scoring a try in his team's 12–8 win at Suncorp Stadium. Early into the 2016 season, he declared that he wanted to play international football for Australia after he found out he was qualified for Australia on residency grounds, so he changed allegiances from Fiji, commenting "I want to be known as the best Fijian rugby player around the world and I want to be playing the top teams," Radradra said. "I want to play alongside all the big names. That's how I made my decision and Australia is the right team for me to showcase my talent". However, while being eligible for Australia, he was ruled ineligible for New South Wales because he did not play junior football in the state before the age of 13. His decision to switch over to play for Australia drew plenty of criticism in the lead-up to the 2016 Anzac Test. On 6 May 2016, Radradra made his debut for Australia against New Zealand in the Anzac Test. He played on the wing and was sin-binned early into the match for a professional foul in the 16–0 win at Hunter Stadium. In June 2016, Radradra was charged with domestic violence which happened in 2014 and 2015 against his ex-partner and it was rumoured that he would not return to play for Parramatta. Radradra finished his highly published 2016 NRL season with him playing in 19 matches and scoring 12 tries for the Eels. On 24 September 2016, Radradra played in the Prime Minister's XIII team against Papua New Guinea, where he played on the wing and scored a try in the 58–0 win in Port Moresby. In October 2016, Radradra was overlooked from Mal Meninga’s 24-man Australia Kangaroos 2016 Four Nations squad due to him being on trial for domestic violence charges.

=== 2017 ===
In round 2, against the St George Illawarra Dragons, Radradra scored a career best four-tries in the 34–16 victory at WIN Stadium. Radradra was the first Parramatta player to score four tries in match since Jarryd Hayne during the 2006 NRL season. On 24 August, Radradra scored 4 tries in Parramatta's big win over Brisbane 52–34. The following week, Radradra scored a hat-trick in Parramatta's victory over Souths to seal a top four spot. In his final game for Parramatta, Radradra scored a 90-metre solo try in Parramatta's elimination final defeat by North Queensland. Radradra finished 2017 with 22 tries in 26 appearances.

== Rugby union ==
=== Toulon ===
In late 2016, it was widely rumoured – and later confirmed in January 2017 – that Radradra had signed a one-year deal for French Top 14 club Toulon. The move would not take place until after the 2017 NRL season. Radradra made his debut for Toulon in round 7 of the 2017–18 Top 14 season against Bordeaux. Radradra scored his first try for the club in the European Rugby Champions Cup with his first touch of the game and just 62 seconds into the match on 21 October 2017, against Italian club Benetton. This followed his Toulon debut a fortnight in advance.

=== Bordeaux ===
On 2 February 2018, Radradra signed a two-year deal with Top 14 team Bordeaux.

=== Bristol Bears ===
On 27 November 2019, Radradra joins Bristol Bears in the English Gallagher Premiership on a three-year contract from the 2020–21 season.

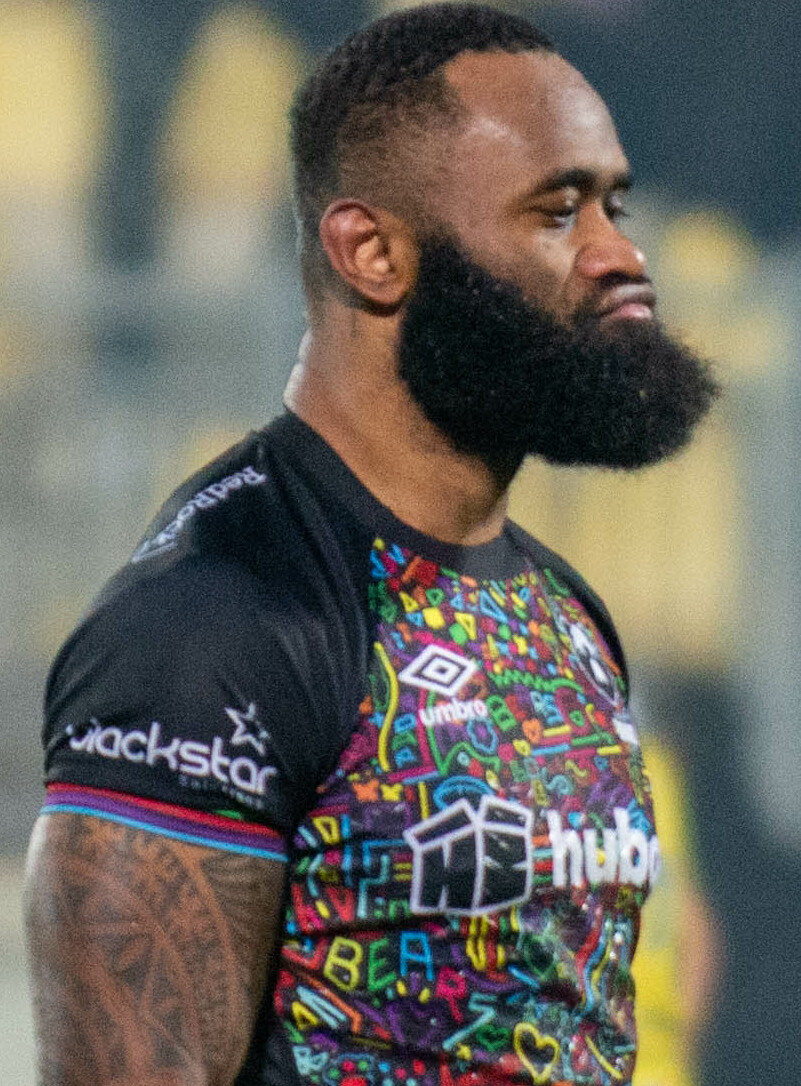
Radradra playing for the Bristol Bears in 2023

=== Barbarians ===
Radradra was selected for the Barbarians to face England in May 2018. Scoring one try and winning the match by 18 points (45–63) at Twickenham Stadium, London, Radradra was named man of the match.

== Fiji ==
In May 2018, Radradra was named in coach John McKee's 2018 Pacific Nations Cup for Fiji. In the November 2018 internationals, he scored a try in Fiji's 21–14 win over France, the first time that Fiji had beaten France.

== Rugby sevens ==
=== Fiji ===
Radradra was named in the Fiji squad for the 2018 London Sevens tournament. Radradra scored three tries in total, winning the title and beating South Africa 21–17 at Twickenham Stadium, London.

He made his Olympic debut representing Fiji at the 2020 Summer Olympics. He was named in the Fiji squad for the men's rugby sevens tournament during the 2020 Summer Olympics. He was also subsequently part of the Fijian side which claimed the gold medal after defeating New Zealand 27 – 12 at the 2020 Summer Olympics.

== Personal life ==
Radradra is nicknamed "Semi Trailer".

In early 2017, Radradra was charged with two counts of domestic violence-related common assault toward his ex-partner. In early May after these public revelations, the charges were dropped when in court it was revealed that his ex-partner was lying in an attempt to blackmail Radradra. In the aftermath of the charges being dropped, television personality Erin Molan was criticised by sections of the media for supposedly painting Radradra as being guilty and not giving the player the presumption of innocence when the allegations were first aired. Molan had publicly stated that Radradra deserved the presumption of innocence, and rather than being specifically about his case, her comments were about what the NRL's stance ought to be in the event of domestic violence being found proven against a player.

Semi is a member of the Church of Jesus Christ of Latter-day Saints and married his wife in the Suva Fiji Temple in 2017.
