= 2013–14 Rhino Club Challenge =

2013-14 Rhino Club Challenge
- Teams: 4
- Premiers: TUKS Blues
- Minor premiers: TUKS Blues (2 title)
- Matches played: 13
- Points scored: 608

The 2013–14 Rhino Club Challenge is the 3rd season of the Rhino Cup, the first division of professional rugby league in South Africa. The contest takes between 7 September and 30 November. There are 4 teams, with the TUKS Blues winning the premiership, and the Middelburg Tigers becoming the runners-up.

== Competition Rules ==
There are five participating clubs in the 2013 Rhino Cup. Teams received three points for a win and two points for a draw. One Bonus point is awarded to teams that score within twelve or less points in a game. Teams were ranked by log points, then points difference (points scored less points conceded).

The top two teams qualify for the title play-off.

== Teams ==
Team	Stadium	City-Area	Season	Foundation
Bloemfontein Roosters	Bobbies Park, Bloemfontein	Bloemfontein, Free State	3rd season	2010
Huskies Rugby League 1	Unknown	Birchleigh, Gauteng	2nd season	2010
Middelburg Tigers 1	Kees Taljaard Sport Stadium	Middelburg, Mpumalanga	3rd season	2005
TUKS Blues	University of Pretoria	Pretoria, Gauteng	3rd season	2006

== Ladder ==
2013-14 Rhino Club Challenge
#	Team	Pld	W	D	L	PF	PA	PD	BNP	Pts
1	TUKS Rugby League	6	6	0	0	320	32	288	0	24
2	Middelburg Tigers 1	6	4	0	2	170	102	68	0	12
3	Bloemfontein Roosters	6	2	0	4	94	170	-76	0	6
4	Huskies Rugby League	6	0	0	6	24	304	-280	0	0
Competition points: For win = 3; For draw = 2; For loss by 12 points or fewer = 1.

== Fixtures and results ==
The 2013 Rhino fixtures and results are as follows:

- All times are South African (GMT+2).

=== Regular season ===
==== September 2013 ====
Home	Score	Away	Match Information
Home	Score	Away	Date and Time	Venue
Bloemfontein Roosters	42 – 12	Huskies RLFC	7 September 2013	Bobbies Park, Bloemfontein
TUKS Rugby League	50 – 16	Bloemfontein Roosters	14 September 2013	University of Pretoria, Pretoria
TUKS Rugby League	90 – 0	Huskies RLFC	21 September 2013	University of Pretoria, Pretoria
Middelburg Tigers 1	36 – 0	Bloemfontein Roosters	21 September 2013	Kees Taljaard Stadium, Middelburg
Middelburg Tigers 1	46 – 12	Huskies RLFC	28 September 2013	Kees Taljaard Stadium, Middelburg
Source: https://web.archive.org/web/20131216122251/http://www.sarugbyleague.co.za/competitions/results

==== October 2013 ====
Home	Score	Away	Match Information
Home	Score	Away	Date and Time	Venue
TUKS Rugby League	46 – 6	Middelburg Tigers 1	5 October 2013	University of Pretoria, Pretoria
Bloemfontein Roosters	50 – 16	Huskies RLFC	26 October 2013	Bobbies Park, Bloemfontein
Source: https://web.archive.org/web/20131216122251/http://www.sarugbyleague.co.za/competitions/results

==== November 2013 ====
Home	Score	Away	Match Information
Home	Score	Away	Date and Time	Venue
TUKS Rugby League	36 – 0	Bloemfontein Roosters	2 November 2013	University of Pretoria, Pretoria
Middelburg Tigers 1	36 – 0	Bloemfontein Roosters	9 November 2013	Kees Taljaard Stadium, Middelburg
TUKS Rugby League	54 – 0	Huskies RLFC	9 November 2013	University of Pretoria, Pretoria
Middelburg Tigers 1	36 – 0	Huskies RLFC	16 November 2013	Kees Taljaard Stadium, Middelburg
TUKS Rugby League	44 – 10	Middelburg Tigers 1	23 November 2013	University of Pretoria, Pretoria
Source: https://web.archive.org/web/20131216122251/http://www.sarugbyleague.co.za/competitions/results

=== Final ===
Home	Score	Away	Match Information
Home	Score	Away	Date and Time	Venue
TUKS Rugby League	36 – 18	Middelburg Tigers 1	30 November 2013	University of Pretoria, Pretoria
Source: https://web.archive.org/web/20131216122251/http://www.sarugbyleague.co.za/competitions/results (Note: It is in the regular season category.)
