= Skåne Stags =

Swedish rugby league club, based in Lund

Skåne Stags RLFC
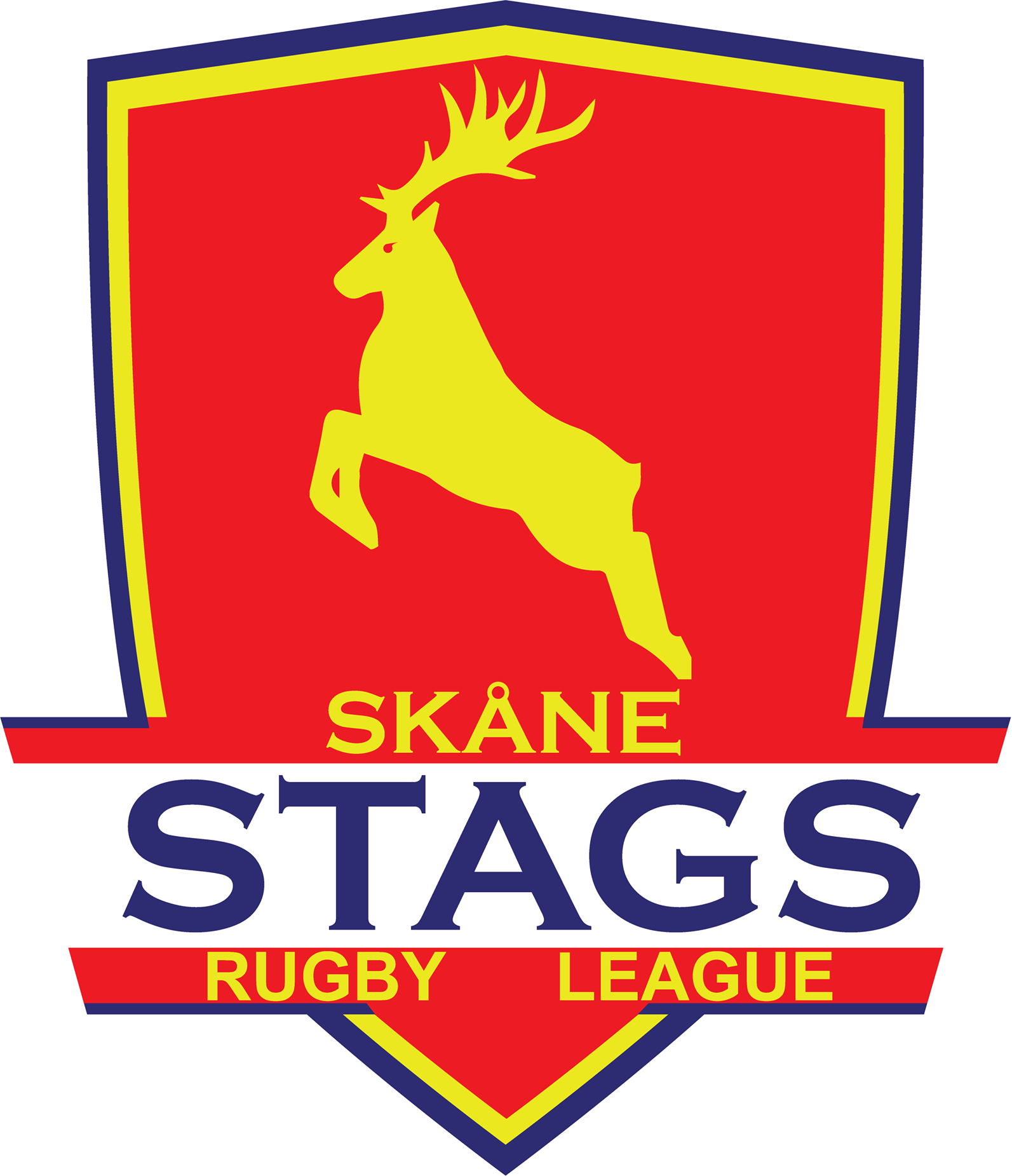

Club information
- Full name: Skåne Stags Rugby League Football Club
- Colours: Red and Yellow
- Founded: 2013; 13 years ago
- Website: skanestags.com

Current details
- Ground: Centrala IP, Lund
- Coach: Sebastian Johnson-Cadwell
- Captain: Dominic Guiry
- Competition: Sweden Super League
- 2022: 1st

Uniforms
Home colours	Away colours

Records
- Sweden Super League: 1 (2017)
- Pan Scandinavian League: 2 (2013, 2014)

The Skåne Stags Rugby League Football Club was the first rugby league club formed in Sweden.

The sport of rugby league was introduced in Sweden in 2007, which led to the Sweden national rugby league team playing in international competitions. The Swedish team initially struggled, but experienced an upturn in results with the founding of Skåne Stags and Kungsbaka Broncos in 2013.

The club played in the Pan Scandinavian league, with Copenhagen RLFC and Kungsbacka Broncos until 2014, when they were crowned champions.

In 2015 the Skåne Stags will play in the Sweden National Rugby League competition, known as the Sweden 'Impact Prowear' League due to sponsorship. Skåne will join the Kungsbacka Broncos and two newly formed clubs, Sodertalje Storm and Stockholms Kungar.

They receive international attention for their pioneering role in development of rugby league in a new area.

== Honours ==
Major titles

Competition	Wins	Years won
Sweden Super League	1	2017
Pan-Scandinavian Championship	2	2013, 2014

Other titles

Competition	Wins	Years won
Skane International 9's	1	2017
