= Copenhagen RLFC =

Danish rugby league club, based in Copenhagen

Club information
- Full name: Copenhagen Rugby League Football Club
- Nickname: Black Swans
- Colours: Black and White
- Founded: 2013; 12 years ago
- Website: http://www.crlfc.dk/

Current details
- Ground: Copenhagen
- Coach: Nigel Kitching
- Competition: Danish Rugby League Championship

The Copenhagen Rugby League Football Club was the first rugby league club formed in Denmark.

The sport of rugby league was introduced in Denmark in 2008, which led to the Denmark national rugby league team playing in international competitions. The Danish team was initially successful, which led to the formation of the Copenhagen RLFC at the Black Swan in Copenhagen on March 2, 2013.

The club has entered into the Pan Scandinavian league, with Skane Crusaders and Kungsbacka Broncos, and will also have matches against teams representing Jutland RLFC and Sweden Barbarians, residential teams including players not eligible for the Sweden National Rugby League Team.

In 2017, Copenhagen RLFC entered into a formal partnership to promote the work of the Diabetesforeningen [The Diabetes Association].
