= Jarvis and Kaplan Cup =

South African annual squash tournament

The Jarvis and Kaplan Cup is an annual inter-provincial team squash tournament that takes place in South Africa (and previously Zimbabwe).

After the death of A.K. Jarvis in 1960 his family donated the trophy, in his memory, for a men's inter-provincial competition. In the same year, Cecil Kaplan and his wife Dorothy donated a trophy for the women's inter-provincial competition. The tournament thereafter became known as the Jarvis and Kaplan Cup.

Through the years other trophies were donated and awarded to eligible recipients. The Gary Thomson trophy is awarded to the province with the best overall results. The Seccie de Villiers award and Clifton-Parks cup is awarded, respectively, to the male and female player who display sportsmanship, tournament support, participate in all events and hold the spirit of the tournament in high regard. The Greg Hammond and Lisa O’Grady trophies are awarded to the most promising men's and women's player. The Lance Sibbald and Glenda Erasmus trophies are awarded to the most improved men's and women's player.

The inaugural tournament took place in 1960 with the women's event played in Johannesburg and the men's event played in Port Elizabeth. The two tournaments were played separately until 1968 when it was decided that both tournaments should be played simultaneously and at the same venue. The host city of the tournament changes every year giving each province the opportunity to host the event.

The tournament is renowned for its traditions and camaraderie. Such traditions include the filing and sharing of the contents of the Jarvis cup, by the winning team's captain, with every player in the tournament. However, there has been some break from tradition as in recent years the tournament has allowed teams to import a player who holds citizenship outside South Africa.

== Men's Team Championship ==
Year	Venue	Winner	Runner-Up
1960	Port Elizabeth	Transvaal A	Eastern Province A
1961	East London	Transvaal A	Eastern Province A
1962	Cape Town	Transvaal A	Western Province A
1963	Durban	Western Province A	Transvaal A
1964	Harare	Transvaal A	Rhodesia A
1965	Johannesburg	Transvaal A	Transvaal B
1966	Port Elizabeth	Transvaal A	Natal A
1967	East London	Transvaal A	Natal A
1968	Harare	Transvaal A	Transvaal B
1969	Pretoria	Transvaal A	Transvaal B
1970	Cape Town	Transvaal A	Natal A
1971	Durban	Natal A	Transvaal A
1972	Johannesburg	Transvaal B	Transvaal A
1973	Port Elizabeth	Transvaal A	Western Province B
1974	Harare	Transvaal A	Transvaal B
1975	East London	Transvaal A	Natal A
1976	Pretoria	Transvaal A	Northern Transvaal A
1977	Cape Town	Transvaal A	Western Province A
1978	Durban	Transvaal A	Western Province A
1979	Johannesburg	Transvaal A	Western Province A
1980	Port Elizabeth	Northern Transvaal A	Western Province A
1981	Benoni	Transvaal A	Western Province A
1982	East London	Transvaal A	Transvaal B
1983	Pretoria	Transvaal A	Western Province A
1984	Cape Town	Transvaal A	Western Province A
1985	Durban	Natal A	Transvaal A
1986	Johannesburg	Transvaal A	SADF
1987	Port Elizabeth	Transvaal A	Transvaal B
1988	East London	Transvaal A	Western Province A
1989	Pretoria	Transvaal A	Western Province A
1990	Cape Town	Transvaal A	Western Province A
1991	Durban	Western Province A	Transvaal A
1992	East London	Western Province A	Northern Transvaal A
1993	Johannesburg	Western Province A	Transvaal A
1994	Port Elizabeth	Western Province A	Gauteng A
1995	Cape Town	Western Province A	Gauteng A
1996	Pretoria	Kwazulu Natal A	Gauteng A
1997	Durban	Gauteng A	Kwazulu Natal A
1998	East London	Gauteng A	Kwazulu Natal A
1999	Johannesburg	Gauteng A	Easterns A
2000	Port Elizabeth	Gauteng A	Kwazulu Natal A
2001	Western Cape	Gauteng A	Kwazulu Natal A
2002	Easterns	Gauteng A	Easterns A
2003	Durban	Kwazulu Natal A	Easterns A
2004	East London	Easterns A	Gauteng A
2005	Pretoria	Easterns A	Gauteng A
2006	Pietermaritzburg	Western Province A	Kwazulu Natal A
2007	Port Elizabeth	Gauteng A	Kwazulu Natal A
2008	Cape Town	Kwazulu Natal A	Western Province A
2009	Johannesburg	Western Province A	Gauteng A
2010	Durban	Kwazulu Natal A	Western Province A
2011	East London	Kwazulu Natal A	Western Province A

Note

- After 1994 Transvaal, Natal, Northern Transvaal became Gauteng, Kwazulu Natal, and Northern Gauteng respectively.
- SADF stands for the South African Defence Force

=== Jarvis champions by province ===
Champions		Runner-up	
Gauteng A	32	Western Province A	14
Western Province A	8	Gauteng A	11
Kwazulu Natal A	7	Kwazulu Natal A	10
Easterns A	2	Gauteng B	7
Northerns A	1	Easterns	3
		Eastern Province A	2
		Northerns	2
		Rhodesia	1
		SADF	1

== Women's Team Championship ==
Year	Venue	Winner	Runner-Up
1960	Johannesburg	Transvaal A	Eastern Province A
1961	Johannesburg	Transvaal A	Eastern Province A
1962	Johannesburg	Rhodesia A	Transvaal A
1963	Johannesburg	Transvaal A	Border A
1964	Johannesburg	Transvaal A	Western Province A
1965	Cape Town	Western Province A	Eastern Province A
1966	Johannesburg	Transvaal A	Rhodesia A
1967	Port Elizabeth	Rhodesia A	Transvaal A
1968	Harare	Rhodesia A	Transvaal A
1969	Pretoria	Transvaal A	Northern Transvaal A
1970	Cape Town	Transvaal A	Western Province A
1971	Durban	Transvaal A	Rhodesia A
1972	Johannesburg	Rhodesia A	Transvaal A
1973	Port Elizabeth	Rhodesia A	Western Province A
1974	Harare	Rhodesia A	Transvaal A
1975	East London	Rhodesia A	Rhodesia B
1976	Pretoria	Rhodesia A	Rhodesia B
1977	Cape Town	Western Province A	Rhodesia A
1978	Durban	Rhodesia A	
1979	Johannesburg	Western Province A	
1980	Port Elizabeth	Western Province A	
1981	Benoni	Western Province A	Transvaal A
1982	East London	Transvaal A	Western Province A
1983	Pretoria	Western Province A	Transvaal A
1984	Cape Town	Western Province A	Transvaal A
1985	Durban	Transvaal A	Western Province A
1986	Johannesburg	Western Province A	Transvaal A
1987	Port Elizabeth	Transvaal A	Natal A
1988	East London	Transvaal A	Natal/W Province A
1989	Pretoria	Transvaal A	Natal A
1990	Cape Town	Transvaal A	Natal A
1991	Durban	Transvaal A	Natal A
1992	East London	Natal A	Transvaal A
1993	Johannesburg	Natal A	Transvaal A
1994	Port Elizabeth	Gauteng A	KwaZulu Natal A
1995	Cape Town	KwaZulu Natal A	Gauteng A
1996	Pretoria	Gauteng A	KwaZulu Natal A
1997	Durban	Gauteng A	Western Province A
1998	East London	Gauteng A	Easterns A
1999	Johannesburg	Easterns A	Gauteng A
2000	Port Elizabeth	Western Province A	Eastern Province A
2001	Western Cape	Western Province A	Gauteng A
2002	Easterns	Gauteng A	Western Province A
2003	Durban	Gauteng A	Western Province A
2004	East London	Western Province A	Northerns A
2005	Pretoria	Western Province A	
2006	Pietermaritzburg	Western Province A	
2007	Port Elizabeth	Western Province A	Easterns A
2008	Cape Town	Gauteng A	Western Province A
2009	Johannesburg	Western Province A	Gauteng A
2010	Durban	Gauteng A	Northerns A
2011	East London	Western Province A	Gauteng A

Note

- After 1994 Transvaal, Natal, Northern Transvaal became Gauteng, Kwazulu Natal, and Northern Gauteng respectively.

=== Kaplan champions by province ===
Champions		Runner-up	
Gauteng A	23	Gauteng A	16
Western Province A	16	Western Province A	10
Rhodesia A	9	Kwazulu Natal A	7
Kwazulu Natal A	3	Eastern Province A	4
Easterns A	1	Rhodesia A	3
		Northerns A	3
		Rhodesia B	2
		Easterns A	1
		Border A	1

== Seccie De Villiers Award ==
Year	Recipient
1984	Mike Bester
1985	Alan Colburn
1986	Chris Holden
1987	Gerald Soames
1988	John van Heeswijk
1989	Jonny Leeb
1990	Grant Way
1991	Guy MacRobert
1992	Paul Symonds
1993	Alan Glover
1994	Mike Farrier
1995	Steve Doeg
1996	Craig van der Wath
1997	Stuart Hailstone
1998	Mike Tootill
1999	Bruce Kaiser
2000	Gary Thomson
2001	Grant Isaacs
2002	Glenn Whitaker
2003	Craig Ruane
2004	Rod Soutter
2005	Richard Driscoll
2006	Zuko Kubukeli
2007	Greg la Mude
2008	Craig Wapnick
2009	Kelvin Edwards
2010	Rodney Durbach
2011	Tim Garner

== Clifton-Parks Award ==
Year	Recipient
2000	Lisa O’Grady
2001	Leora Greenwood
2002	Geraldine Morcom
2003	Vivienne Doeg
2004	Sharon le Roux
2005	Ferrah Fenner
2006	Samantha Herbert
2007	Sonia Pinter
2008	Siyoli Lusaseni
2009	Sacha West
2010	Judy van der Veen
2011	Tenille van der Merwe

== Greg Hammond Trophy ==
Year	Recipient
2000	Chris van Rensburg
2001	Gareth Schnehage
2003	Nico Mulder
2004	Nico Mulder
2005	Richard Colburn
2006	Jonathon Damons
2007	Stephano Garas
2008	Paul Rodrigues
2009	Michael Wood
2010	J.P. Brits
2011	Jarryd Terblanche

== Lisa O'Grady Trophy ==
Year	Recipient
2008	Alushca Botha
2009	Robyn Baptiste
2010	Alexandra Fuller
2011	Elani Landman

== Lance Sibbald Trophy ==
Year	Recipient
2001	Gareth Schnehage
2003	Clinton Leeuw
2004	Clinton Broedelet
2005	Stephen Coppinger
2006	Grant Joubert
2007	Richard Dodd
2008	Rudi Willemse
2009	T G Raubenheimer
2010	Michael Wood
2011	Paul Rodrigues

== Glenda Erasmus Trophy ==
Year	Recipient
1993	Annelize Naudé
1999	Charlene Rossel
2000	Liesl Claxton
2001	Juanette Le Roux
2003	Gina Robinson
2004	Tenille Swartz
2005	Not Presented
2006	Milnay Louw
2007	Lizelle van Niekerk
2008	Milnay Louw
2009	Senade Haupt
2010	Cheyna Tucker
2011	Robyn Baptiste

== Gary Thomson Trophy ==
Year	Recipient
2000	Eastern Province
2001	Border/KwaZulu Natal
2002	Gauteng
2003	KwaZulu Natal
2004	Border
2005	Northerns
2006	Eastern Province/Western Province
2007	Western Province
2008	Western Province
2009	Western Province
2010	Western Province
2011	Western Province
