= Protea Cup =

Protea Cup Challenge
- Current season or competition: 2021–22 South African Rugby League season
- Sport: Rugby league
- Instituted: 2013
- Inaugural season: 2013-14
- Number of teams: 4
- Country: South Africa
- Holders: Tomahawks RLC (2021-22)
- Most titles: Tomahawks RLC (1 title)
- Related competition: Rhino Cup

The Protea Cup is a semi-professional rugby league competition in South Africa and is the national second division competition of South Africa. The current holders are the Tomahawks, who beat Loskop Leopards 32-30 in the 2021-22 Grand Final.

== Current Teams ==
Team	Stadium	City-Area	Foundation
Loskop Leopards	Loskop	Loskop, Mpumalanga	Unknown
Silverton Silverbacks	Silver Valke Sports Ground	Silverton, Mpumalanga	2013
Tomahawks RLC	Unknown	Unknown	Unknown
Wolverines RLC	Unknown	Unknown	Unknown

Those highlighted in grey withdrew from the competition throughout the 2013-14 season.

== Former Teams ==
Team	Stadium	City-Area	Years
East Rand Falcons	Police Sports Ground	Springs, Gauteng	2013
Ermelo Tomahawks	AJ Swannepoel	Ermelo, Mpumalanga	2008
Elsburg Fish Eagles	Elsburg Rugby Club	Germiston, Limpopo	2013-14
Groblersdal Leopards	Chris Wiid Stadium	Groblersdal, Mpumalanga	2013
Huskies Rugby League 2	HS Birchleigh	Birchleigh, Gauteng	2013
Johannesburg Bobbies	Marks Park	Johannesburg, Gauteng	2013-14
Middelburg Tigers 2	Kees Taljaard Stadium	Middelburg, Mpumalanga	2005

== See also ==
- Rhino Cup
