= Rhino Cup =

Rugby league competition in South Africa

Rhino Cup Club Challenge
- Sport: Rugby league
- Instituted: 2011
- Inaugural season: 2011-12
- Country: South Africa
- Holders: Grizzlies (2024–25)
- Related competition: Protea Cup

The Rhino Cup is a semi-professional rugby league competition in South Africa and is the national first division competition.

== Current clubs ==
- Brits Bulldogs
- Centurian Lions
- Grizzlies
- Harlequins
- Nigel Rabbitohs
- Pretoria RLC
- St Helens Vultures

== Results ==
List of finals
Season	Winners	Score	Runners-up	Ref.
2011–12		–		
2012–13	Tuks Reds	36–0	Middleburg Tigers	
2013–14	Tuks Reds	36–18	Middleburg Tigers 1	
2014–15		–		
2015–16		–		
2016–17	Brakpan Bears	24–14	Tuks Reds	
2017–18		–		
2018–19		–		
2019–20		–		
2020–21	cancelled			
2021–22	Tuks Red	30–22	St Helens Vultures	
2022–23	Pretoria RLC	42–32	Nigel Rabbitohs	
2023–24	Grizzlies	37–32	Rabbitohs Blue	
2024–25	Grizzlies	53–26	St Helens Vultures	

== See also ==
- Protea Cup
