= 2013 Rugby League World Cup squads =

The 2013 Rugby League World Cup featured the national teams (selected from twenty-four-man squads) of fourteen nations.

== Pool A ==
=== Australia ===
With New Zealand claiming the trophy in 2008 and no tournament having been held prior to that since 2000, Australia's squad didn't feature a single World Cup winner.

Head coach: (Australia) Tim Sheens

Player	Games	Points	Position	Club
Billy Slater	4	16	FB	(Australia) Melbourne Storm
Darius Boyd	5	16	FB	(Australia) Newcastle Knights
Jarryd Hayne	5	36	WG	(Australia) Parramatta Eels
Brett Morris	5	36	WG	(Australia) St George Illawarra Dragons
Greg Inglis	5	8	CE	(Australia) South Sydney Rabbitohs
Michael Jennings	1	4	CE	(Australia) Sydney Roosters
Josh Morris	2	4	CE	(Australia) Canterbury Bulldogs
Brent Tate	3	0	CE	(Australia) North Queensland Cowboys
Johnathan Thurston	4	74	SO	(Australia) North Queensland Cowboys
Daly Cherry-Evans	6	8	SH	(Australia) Manly Sea Eagles
Cooper Cronk	5	20	SH	(Australia) Melbourne Storm
Andrew Fifita	6	8	PR	(Australia) Cronulla Sharks
Nate Myles	2	0	PR	(Australia) Gold Coast Titans
Josh Papalii	4	8	PR	(Australia) Canberra Raiders
Matt Scott	5	0	PR	(Australia) North Queensland Cowboys
James Tamou	6	4	PR	(Australia) North Queensland Cowboys
Cameron Smith (captain)	6	10	HK	(Australia) Melbourne Storm
Robbie Farah	3	0	HK	(Australia) Wests Tigers
Greg Bird	5	8	SR	(Australia) Gold Coast Titans
Boyd Cordner	2	0	SR	(Australia) Sydney Roosters
Luke Lewis	2	4	SR	(Australia) Cronulla Sharks
Corey Parker	5	8	SR	(Australia) Brisbane Broncos
Sam Thaiday	5	0	SR	(Australia) Brisbane Broncos
Paul Gallen (vice-captain)	6	0	LF	(Australia) Cronulla Sharks

=== England ===
Head coach: (England) Steve McNamara

Player	Games	Points	Position	Club
Zak Hardaker	0	0	FB	(England) Leeds Rhinos
Sam Tomkins	5	0	FB	(England) Wigan Warriors
Tom Briscoe	2	8	WG	(England) Hull FC
Josh Charnley	3	12	WG	(England) Wigan Warriors
Ryan Hall	5	32	WG	(England) Leeds Rhinos
Leroy Cudjoe	5	4	CE	(England) Huddersfield Giants
Kallum Watkins	5	8	CE	(England) Leeds Rhinos
Rangi Chase	4	4	SO	(England) Castleford Tigers
Kevin Sinfield (captain)	5	38	SO	(England) Leeds Rhinos
Gareth Widdop	3	2	SO	(Australia) Melbourne Storm
Rob Burrow	2	4	SH	(England) Leeds Rhinos
George Burgess	5	4	PR	(Australia) South Sydney Rabbitohs
Sam Burgess	4	8	PR	(Australia) South Sydney Rabbitohs
Tom Burgess	2	0	PR	(Australia) South Sydney Rabbitohs
James Graham	4	0	PR	(Australia) Canterbury Bulldogs
Chris Hill	5	0	PR	(England) Warrington Wolves
Lee Mossop	1	0	PR	(England) Wigan Warriors
Michael McIlorum	2	0	HK	(England) Wigan Warriors
James Roby	4	0	HK	(England) St. Helens
Carl Ablett	3	0	SR	(England) Leeds Rhinos
Liam Farrell	2	0	SR	(England) Wigan Warriors
Brett Ferres*	5	12	SR	(England) Huddersfield Giants
Ben Westwood	5	4	SR	(England) Warrington Wolves
Sean O'Loughlin	4	8	LF	(England) Wigan Warriors

* Replaced initially named Gareth Hock prior to the tournament.

=== Fiji ===
Head coach: (Australia) Rick Stone

Player	Games	Points	Position	Club
Kevin Naiqama	5	4	FB	(Australia) Newcastle Knights
Marika Koroibete	5	0	WG	(Australia) Wests Tigers
Akuila Uate	4	12	WG	(Australia) Newcastle Knights
Semi Radradra	3	4	WG	(Australia) Parramatta Eels
Sisa Waqa	4	0	WG	(Australia) Melbourne Storm
Ilisavani Jegesa	0	0	CE	(Fiji) Nabua Broncos
Daryl Millard	4	0	CE	(France) Catalans Dragons
Wes Naiqama	4	26	CE	(Australia) Penrith Panthers
Kaliova Nauqe Tani	0	0	SO	(Australia) Fassifern Bombers
Alipate Noilea	2	2	SO	(Australia) Collegians Illawarra
Ryan Millard*	1	0	SO	(Australia) Burwood United
Aaron Groom	5	4	SH	(Australia) North Sydney Bears
Petero Civoniceva (captain)	5	0	PR	(Australia) Redcliffe Dolphins
Kane Evans	5	0	PR	(Australia) Canterbury Bulldogs
Ashton Sims	5	0	PR	(Australia) North Queensland Cowboys
Korbin Sims	3	4	PR	(Australia) Newcastle Knights
Eloni Vunakece	5	4	PR	(France) Toulouse Olympique
Apisai Koroisau	4	0	HK	(Australia) South Sydney Rabbitohs
James Storer	5	0	HK	(Australia) Collegians Illawarra
Tikiko Noke	0	0	SR	(Fiji) Lautoka Crushers
Vitale Junior Roqica	5	4	SR	(Australia) Cronulla Sharks
Tariq Sims	5	4	SR	(Australia) North Queensland Cowboys
Jayson Bukuya	5	0	LF	(Australia) Cronulla Sharks
Peni Botiki	1	0	LF	(Fiji) Saru Dragons

* Replaced initially named John Sutton prior to the tournament.

=== Ireland ===
Head coach: (England) Mark Aston

Player	Games	Points	Position	Club
Scott Grix	2	0	FB	(England) Huddersfield Giants
Damien Blanch	3	4	WG	(France) Catalans Dragons
Pat Richards	3	2	WG	(England) Wigan Warriors
Joshua Toole	1	0	WG	(Australia) Mounties
Stuart Littler	3	0	CE	(England) Leigh Centurions
James Mendeika	3	0	CE	(England) Warrington Wolves
Marc Sneyd	0	0	SO	(England) Salford Red Devils
Liam Finn (captain)	3	0	SH	(England) Featherstone Rovers
Apirana Pewhairangi	2	0	SH	(Australia) Parramatta Eels
Brett White	3	0	PR	(Australia) Canberra Raiders
Luke Ambler	2	0	PR	(England) Halifax
Matty Hadden*	0	0	PR	(England) Oxford Rugby League
Eamon O'Carroll	1	0	PR	(England) Widnes Vikings
Anthony Mullally	3	0	PR	(England) Huddersfield Giants
Colton Roche	0	0	PR	(England) Sheffield Eagles
Bob Beswick	3	0	HK	(England) Halifax
Rory Kostjasyn	3	0	HK	(Australia) North Queensland Cowboys
Simon Finnigan	2	0	SR	(England) Leigh Centurions
Dave Allen	3	0	SR	(England) Widnes Vikings
Tyrone McCarthy	3	4	SR	(England) Warrington Wolves
Kurt Haggerty	1	0	SR	(England) Barrow Raiders
Danny Bridge	1	0	SR	(England) Warrington Wolves
James Hasson	3	4	SR	(Australia) Manly Sea Eagles
Ben Currie	3	0	LF	(England) Warrington Wolves

* Replaced initially named Simon Grix who was ruled out by injury prior to the tournament.

== Pool B ==
=== New Zealand ===
Head coach: (New Zealand) Stephen Kearney

Player	Games	Points	Position	Club
Josh Hoffman	2	4	FB	(Australia) Brisbane Broncos
Kevin Locke	4	0	FB	New Zealand Warriors
Jason Nightingale	2	0	WG	(Australia) St George Illawarra Dragons
Roger Tuivasa-Sheck	6	32	WG	(Australia) Sydney Roosters
Manu Vatuvei	4	16	WG	New Zealand Warriors
Bryson Goodwin	6	16	CE	(Australia) South Sydney Rabbitohs
Krisnan Inu	1	4	CE	(Australia) Canterbury Bulldogs
Dean Whare	5	8	CE	(Australia) Penrith Panthers
Kieran Foran (vice-captain)	6	0	SO	(Australia) Manly Sea Eagles
Thomas Leuluai	1	0	SO	New Zealand Warriors
Shaun Johnson	6	76	SH	New Zealand Warriors
Jesse Bromwich	5	4	PR	(Australia) Melbourne Storm
Sam Kasiano	5	0	PR	(Australia) Canterbury Bulldogs
Sam Moa	3	0	PR	(Australia) Sydney Roosters
Ben Matulino	5	0	PR	New Zealand Warriors
Jared Waerea-Hargreaves	5	0	PR	(Australia) Sydney Roosters
Isaac Luke	6	4	HK	(Australia) South Sydney Rabbitohs
Greg Eastwood	1	4	SR	(Australia) Canterbury Bulldogs
Alex Glenn	4	0	SR	(Australia) Brisbane Broncos
Simon Mannering (captain)	5	8	SR	New Zealand Warriors
Frank Pritchard	3	4	SR	(Australia) Canterbury Bulldogs
Sonny Bill Williams*	5	12	SR	(Australia) Sydney Roosters
Frank-Paul Nu'uausala	6	12	LF	(Australia) Sydney Roosters
Elijah Taylor	6	4	LF	New Zealand Warriors

* Replaced initially named Tohu Harris prior to the tournament.

=== Papua New Guinea ===
Head coach: (Papua New Guinea) Adrian Lam

Player	Games	Points	Position	Club
Josiah Abavu	3	4	FB	(Papua New Guinea) Port Moresby Vipers
Wellington Albert	1	4	WG	(Papua New Guinea) Lae Bombers
Nene MacDonald	3	4	WG	(Australia) Sydney Roosters
David Mead	3	0	WG	(Australia) Gold Coast Titans
Richard Kambo	2	0	CE	(Papua New Guinea) Port Moresby Vipers
Jessie Joe Parker	3	4	CE	(England) Whitehaven
Francis Paniu	1	2	CE	(Papua New Guinea) Rabaul Gurias
Jason Tali	2	0	CE	(Papua New Guinea) Mount Hagen Eagles
Menzie Yere	3	0	CE	(England) Sheffield Eagles
Dion Aiye	3	4	SO	(Papua New Guinea) Rabaul Gurias
Israel Eliab	2	0	SO	(Papua New Guinea) Port Moresby Vipers
Ase Boas	1	0	SH	(Papua New Guinea) Rabaul Gurias
Roger Laka	0	0	SH	(Papua New Guinea) Enga Mioks
Ray Thompson	3	0	SH	(Australia) North Queensland Cowboys
Joe Bruno*	1	0	PR	(Papua New Guinea) Rabaul Gurias
Enoch Maki	2	0	PR	(Papua New Guinea) Port Moresby Vipers
Mark Mexico	3	0	PR	(Papua New Guinea) Rabaul Gurias
Paul Aiton	3	0	HK	(England) Wakefield Trinity Wildcats
Charlie Wabo	3	0	HK	(Papua New Guinea) Port Moresby Vipers
Jason Chan	3	0	SR	(England) Huddersfield Giants
Neville Costigan (captain)	3	0	SR	(Australia) Newcastle Knights
Sebastien Pandia	1	0	SR	(Papua New Guinea) Port Moresby Vipers
Larsen Marabe	2	0	LF	(Papua New Guinea) Port Moresby Vipers

* Replaced initially named James Segeyaro who was ruled out by injury.

=== France ===
Head coach: (England) Richard Agar

Player	Games	Points	Position	Club
Morgan Escare	4	4	FB	(France) Catalans Dragons
Clint Greenshields	3	0	FB	(Australia) North Queensland Cowboys
Damien Cardace*	1	0	WG	(France) Catalans Dragons
Younes Khattabi	1	0	WG	(France) AS Carcassonne
Cyril Stacul	1	0	WG	(France) Lézignan Sangliers
Frédéric Vaccari	3	0	WG	(France) Catalans Dragons
Vincent Duport	4	4	CE	(France) Catalans Dragons
Jean-Philippe Baile	4	0	CE	(France) Catalans Dragons
Thomas Bosc	4	12	SO	(France) Catalans Dragons
Tony Gigot	1	0	SO	(Australia) Cronulla Sharks
William Barthau	3	1	SH	(France) Catalans Dragons
Théo Fages	2	0	SH	(England) Salford Red Devils
Rémi Casty	4	0	PR	(France) Catalans Dragons
Michael Simon	4	0	PR	(France) Catalans Dragons
Jamal Fakir	4	0	PR	(France) Catalans Dragons
Kane Bentley	2	0	HK	(France) Toulouse Olympique
Éloi Pélissier	3	0	HK	(France) Catalans Dragons
Andrew Bentley	1	0	SR	(France) Toulouse Olympique
Olivier Elima (captain)	3	0	SR	(France) Catalans Dragons
Kevin Larroyer	3	0	SR	(France) Catalans Dragons
Antoni Maria	2	0	SR	(France) Catalans Dragons
Sebastien Raguin	4	0	SR	(France) Saint-Estève XIII Catalan
Benjamin Garcia*	3	0	LF	(France) Catalans Dragons
Grégory Mounis	4	0	LF	(France) Catalans Dragons

* Replaced initially named Clément Soubeyras and Mathias Pala who were ruled out by injuries.

=== Samoa ===
Head coach: (Australia) Matt Parish

Player	Games	Points	Position	Club
Anthony Milford	4	24	FB	(Australia) Canberra Raiders
Daniel Vidot	4	4	WG	(Australia) St George Illawarra Dragons
Antonio Winterstein	4	20	WG	(Australia) Brisbane Broncos
Tim Lafai	3	0	CE	(Australia) Canterbury Bulldogs
Joseph "BJ" Leilua	4	4	CE	(Australia) Newcastle Knights
Junior Sa'u^{1}	1	0	CE	(Australia) Melbourne Storm
Ben Roberts	4	8	SO	(Australia) Parramatta Eels
Pita Godinet	4	8	SH	New Zealand Warriors
Penani Manumalealii	3	4	SH	(Australia) Cronulla Sharks
Mose Masoe	4	0	PR	(Australia) Penrith Panthers
Suaia Matagi	4	8	PR	New Zealand Warriors
Junior Moors	3	0	PR	(Australia) Melbourne Storm
Edward Purcell	0	0	PR	(New Zealand) Mount Albert Lions
Mark Taufua	4	0	PR	(Australia) Cronulla Sharks
Michael Sio^{2}	3	0	HK	New Zealand Warriors
Faleniu Iosi	0	0	HK	(Samoa) Letava Bulldogs
Leeson Ah Mau^{2}	3	0	SR	(Australia) St George Illawarra Dragons
David Fa’alogo	4	0	SR	(Australia) Newcastle Knights
Harrison Hansen (Captain)	0	0	SR	(England) Wigan Warriors
Sia Soliola (Vice-Captain)	4	0	SR	(England) St. Helens
Sauaso Sue	4	4	SR	(Australia) Wests Tigers
Frank Winterstein^{2}	1	0	SR	(England) Widnes Vikings
Reni Maitua	1	0	LF	(Australia) Parramatta Eels
Ionatana Tino	0	0	LF	(Samoa) Apia Barracudas
Tony Puletua^{3}	2	0	SR	(England) St. Helens

^{1} Replaced Roy Asotasi who withdrew from the side.

^{2} Replaced initially named Arden McCarthy, Masada Iosefa and Teofilo Lepou who were ruled out by injuries

^{3} Allowed to be called up mid-tournament, following injuries to Harrison Hansen, Reni Maitua and Frank Winterstein.

== Pool C ==
=== Scotland ===
Head coach: (England) Steve McCormack

Player	Games	Points	Position	Club
Alex Hurst	4	12	FB	(England) London Broncos
Brett Carter	2	4	WG	(England) Workington Town
David Scott	2	0	WG	(England) Featherstone Rovers
Ben Hellewell	4	8	CE	(England) Featherstone Rovers
Kane Linnett	3	4	CE	(Australia) North Queensland Cowboys
Matty Russell	4	16	CE	(Australia) Gold Coast Titans
Callum Phillips*	0	0	SO	(England) Workington Town
Danny Brough (captain)	4	26	SH	(England) Huddersfield Giants
Peter Wallace	4	0	SH	(Australia) Brisbane Broncos
Josh Barlow*	0	0	PR	(England) Swinton Lions
Luke Douglas	4	4	PR	(Australia) Gold Coast Titans
Ben Kavanagh	4	0	PR	(England) Widnes Vikings
Brett Phillips	4	4	PR	(England) Workington Town
Mitchell Stringer	3	0	PR	(England) Sheffield Eagles
Adam Walker	4	0	PR	(England) Hull Kingston Rovers
Oliver Wilkes	4	0	PR	(England) Wakefield Trinity Wildcats
Ben Fisher	2	4	HK	(England) London Broncos
Andrew Henderson	2	0	HK	(England) Sheffield Eagles
Ian Henderson	3	0	HK	(France) Catalans Dragons
Sam Barlow	2	0	SR	(England) Halifax
Dale Ferguson	3	0	SR	(England) Huddersfield Giants
Alex Szostak	2	0	SR	(England) Sheffield Eagles
Danny Addy	4	4	LF	(England) Bradford Bulls
Rhys Lovegrove	0	0	LF	(England) Hull Kingston Rovers

* Replaced initially named Gareth Moore and Jonathan Walker who were ruled out by injuries.

=== Tonga ===
Head coach: Charlie Tonga

Player	Games	Points	Position	Club
Glen Fisi'iahi	2	8	FB	New Zealand Warriors
Nesiasi Mataitonga	1	0	FB	(Australia) Cronulla Sharks
Sosaia Feki	1	0	WG	(Australia) Cronulla Sharks
Jorge Taufua	3	4	WG	(Australia) Manly Sea Eagles
Daniel Tupou	3	0	WG	(Australia) Sydney Roosters
Mahe Fonua	2	0	CE	(Australia) Melbourne Storm
Konrad Hurrell	3	4	CE	New Zealand Warriors
Siuatonga Likiliki	1	0	CE	(Australia) Newcastle Knights
Samisoni Langi	3	14	SO	(Australia) Sydney Roosters
Daniel Foster	3	4	SH	(Australia) Penrith Panthers
Brent Kite (captain)	3	0	PR	(Australia) Manly Sea Eagles
Fuifui Moimoi	3	0	PR	(Australia) Parramatta Eels
Mickey Paea	3	0	PR	(England) Hull Kingston Rovers
Ukuma Ta'ai	3	0	PR	(England) Huddersfield Giants
Siosaia Vave	2	0	PR	(Australia) Melbourne Storm
Siliva Havili	1	0	HK	New Zealand Warriors
Pat Politoni	2	0	HK	(Australia) Cronulla Sharks
Nafe Seluini	3	4	HK	(Australia) Sydney Roosters
Sydney Havea	0	0	SR	(Tonga) Liahona Old Boys
Sika Manu	2	8	SR	(Australia) Penrith Panthers
Willie Manu	3	8	SR	(England) St. Helens
Ben Murdoch-Masila	1	0	SR	(Australia) Wests Tigers
Jason Taumalolo	2	4	SR	(Australia) North Queensland Cowboys
Peni Terepo	1	4	LF	(Australia) Parramatta Eels

=== Italy ===
Head coach: (Italy) Carlo Napolitano

Player	Games	Points	Position	Club
Anthony Minichiello (captain)	3	4	FB	(Australia) Sydney Roosters
James Tedesco	3	4	FB	(Australia) Wests Tigers
Fabrizio Ciaurro	0	0	FB	(Italy) Tirreno
Josh Mantellato	3	22	WG	(Australia) Newcastle Knights
James Saltonstall	0	0	CE	(England) Warrington Wolves
Chris Centrone	3	8	CE	(Australia) North Sydney Bears
Christophe Calegari	0	0	CE	(France) Lézignan Sangliers
Ryan Ghetti	3	0	SO	(Australia) Northern Pride
Ben Falcone	3	0	SH	(Australia) Souths Logan Magpies
Tim Macann*	0	0	SH	(Australia) Tweed Heads Seagulls
Sam Gardel	1	0	PR	(Australia) Souths Logan Magpies
Gavin Hiscox	0	0	PR	(Australia) Central Queensland Capras
Anthony Laffranchi	3	0	PR	(England) St. Helens
Kade Snowden*	2	0	PR	(Australia) Newcastle Knights
Paul Vaughan	3	0	PR	(Australia) Canberra Raiders
Ray Nasso*	3	8	HK	(France) SO Avignon
Dean Parata	3	0	HK	(Australia) Parramatta Eels
Cameron Ciraldo	3	4	SR	(Australia) Penrith Panthers
Joel Riethmuller	3	0	SR	(Australia) North Queensland Cowboys
Ryan Tramonte	3	0	SR	(Australia) Windsor Wolves
Aidan Guerra	3	8	SR	(Australia) Sydney Roosters
Mark Minichiello	3	4	SR	(Australia) Gold Coast Titans
Gioele Celerino	0	0	LF	(Italy) North West Roosters
Brenden Santi	3	0	LF	(Australia) Wests Tigers

* Replaced initially named Terry Campese, Craig Gower and Vic Mauro who were ruled out by injuries prior to the tournament.

== Pool D ==
=== Cook Islands ===
Head coach: (Australia) David Fairleigh

Player	Games	Points	Position	Club
Jordan Rapana	2	4	FB	(Australia) Canberra Raiders
Drury Low	2	4	WG	(Australia) Canterbury Bulldogs
Anthony Gelling	2	0	WG	(England) Wigan Warriors
Dominique Peyroux	3	8	WG	New Zealand Warriors
Keith Lulia	3	4	CE	(England) Bradford Bulls
Lulia Lulia	2	4	CE	(Australia) Illawarra Cutters
Rea Pittman*	1	0	CE	(Australia) Cronulla Sharks
Tyrone Viiga	0	0	CE	(Australia) Cronulla Sharks
Johnathon Ford	2	4	SO	(France) Toulouse Olympique
Chris Taripo	2	24	SO	(Australia) Newtown Jets
Isaac John	3	4	SH	(Australia) Penrith Panthers
Hikule'o Malu	1	0	SH	New Zealand Warriors
Joe Matapuku	2	0	PR	(Australia) North Sydney Bears
Hercules Napa	3	0	PR	(Australia) Sydney Roosters
Adam Tangata	3	0	PR	(Australia) Mount Pritchard
Samuel Brunton	2	0	HK	(Australia) Mount Pritchard
Daniel Fepuleai	3	4	HK	(Australia) North Sydney Bears
Sam Mataora	2	0	SR	(Australia) Canberra Raiders
Tupou Sopoaga	2	0	SR	(Australia) Cronulla Sharks
Zeb Taia (Captain)	3	0	SR	(France) Catalans Dragons
Brad Takairangi	3	4	SR	(Australia) Gold Coast Titans
Zane Tetevano	2	0	SR	(Australia) Newcastle Knights
Tinirau Arona	3	0	LF	(Australia) Newtown Jets

* Replaced initially named Geoff Daniela who was ruled out by injury.

=== United States ===
Head coach: (Australia) Terry Matterson

Player	Games	Points	Position	Club
Kristian Freed	4	4	FB	(United States) Connecticut Wildcats
Matt Petersen	4	8	WG	(Australia) Cudgen Hornets
Bureta Fariamo	4	4	WG	(Australia) Mackay Cutters
Taylor Welch	3	4	WG	(United States) New York Raiders
Gabriel Farley	0	0	CE	(United States) Southampton Dragons
Mike Garvey	3	0	CE	(Australia) Ipswich Jets
Lelauloto Tagaloa	2	0	CE	(United States) Hawaii Chiefs
Joseph Paulo (captain)	4	20	SO	(Australia) Parramatta Eels
David Marando	1	0	SH	(Australia) Belrose Eagles
Craig Priestley	4	4	SH	(United States) Southampton Dragons
Joel Luani	4	0	HK	(Australia) Wests Tigers
Tui Samoa	4	8	HK	(Australia) Redcliffe Dolphins
Stephen Howard	1	0	PR	(Australia) Tuggeranong Bushrangers
Judah Lavulo	2	0	PR	(Australia) Cabramatta Two Blues
Mark Offerdahl	4	4	PR	(United States) Connecticut Wildcats
Junior Paulo	1	0	PR	(Australia) Parramatta Eels
Les Soloai	3	0	PR	(United States) Utah Avalanche
Roman Hifo	3	0	SR	(New Zealand) Mangere East Hawks
Clint Newton	4	8	SR	(Australia) Penrith Panthers
Eddy Pettybourne	4	0	SR	(Australia) Wests Tigers
Matt Shipway	4	0	SR	(Australia) Newcastle South
Danny Howard	4	0	LF	(Australia) Wentworthville Magpies

- Luke Hume was initially named in the squad but was replaced due to injury by Taylor Welch prior to the tournament.
- Andrew Durutalo was ruled out due to injury and replaced by Eddy Pettybourne.
- Ryan McGoldrick was initially named in the squad but withdrew from the squad for family reasons prior to the tournament.
- Mark Cantoni was named but withdrew after breaking his arm in a warm up match against France.

=== Wales ===
Head coach: (Wales) Iestyn Harris

Player	Games	Points	Position	Club
Elliot Kear	3	4	FB	(England) Bradford Bulls
Rhys Evans	3	0	WG	(England) Warrington Wolves
Rhys Williams	2	0	WG	(England) Warrington Wolves
Rob Massam	1	4	CE	North Wales Crusaders
Christiaan Roets	3	16	CE	North Wales Crusaders
Danny Jones	1	2	SO	(England) Keighley Cougars
Lloyd White	3	14	SO	(England) Widnes Vikings
Matt Seamark	2	0	SH	(Australia) Wynnum Manly Seagulls
Gil Dudson	3	0	PR	(England) Wigan Warriors
Jacob Emmitt	1	0	PR	(England) Salford Red Devils
Ben Evans	2	4	PR	(England) Bradford Bulls
Dan Fleming	0	0	PR	(England) Castleford Tigers
Ben Flower	3	0	PR	(England) Wigan Warriors
Jordan James	3	0	PR	(England) Salford Red Devils
Craig Kopczak (captain)	3	0	PR	(England) Huddersfield Giants
Neil Budworth	3	0	HK	(Australia) Moranbah Miners
Ian Webster	2	0	HK	(Australia) Central Queensland Capras
Ross Divorty	1	0	SR	(England) York City Knights
Tyson Frizell	3	0	SR	(Australia) St George Illawarra Dragons
James Geurtjens	0	0	SR	(Australia) Norths Devils
Rhodri Lloyd	2	8	SR	(England) Wigan Warriors
Larne Patrick	3	0	SR	(England) Huddersfield Giants
Anthony Walker	2	4	SR	(England) St. Helens
Peter Lupton	3	0	LF	(England) Workington Town
