= 2013 Rugby League World Cup Group D =

2013 Rugby League World Cup Group D is one of the four groups in the 2013 Rugby League World Cup. The group comprises Cook Islands, United States and Wales.

== Table ==
Team	Pld	W	D	L	TF	PF	PA	+/−	Pts
United States	3	2	0	1	13	64	58	+6	4
Cook Islands	3	1	0	2	12	64	78	–14	2
Wales	3	0	0	3	11	56	84	–28	0

All times are local – UTC+0/GMT.

== United States vs Cook Islands ==
30 October 2013
20:00

United States	32–20	Cook Islands
Try: Faraimo 13' m Petersen 16' m Joseph Paulo 42' m Samoa 59' c Offerdahl 71' c Priestley 73' c Goal: Joseph Paulo (4/8) 25', 59', 74', 77'	Report	Try: Takairangi 3' c Low 36' m Lulia 47' m Peyroux 62' c Goal: Rapana (2/4) 4', 63'

Memorial Stadium, Bristol
Attendance: 7,247
Referee: Ben Thaler (England)
Player of the Match: Joseph Paulo (United States)

FB	1	Kristian Freed
RW	2	Bureta Faraimo
RC	3	Michael Garvey
LC	4	Lelauloto Tagaloa
LW	5	Matt Petersen
SO	6	Joseph Paulo (c)
SH	7	Craig Priestley
PR	8	Junior Paulo
HK	9	Joel Luani
PR	10	Eddy Pettybourne
SR	11	Clint Newton
SR	12	Matt Shipway
LF	13	Daniel Howard
Substitutes
IC	14	Tui Samoa
IC	15	Mark Offerdahl
IC	16	Stephen Howard
IC	17	Les Soloai
Coach:
(Australia) Terry Matterson

FB	1	Drury Low
RW	2	Lulia Lulia
RC	3	Anthony Gelling
LC	4	Keith Lulia
LW	5	Jordan Rapana
SO	6	Brad Takairangi
SH	7	Isaac John
PR	8	Hercules Napa
HK	9	Daniel Fepuleai
PR	10	Zane Tetevano
SR	11	Zeb Taia (c)
SR	12	Dominique Peyroux
LF	13	Tinirau Arona
Substitutes
IC	14	Sam Brunton
IC	15	Sam Mataora
IC	16	Tupou Sopoaga
IC	17	Adam Tangata
Coach:
(Australia) David Fairleigh

Touch Judges:
George Stokes (England)
Chris Leatherbarrow (England)
Video Referee:
Richard Silverwood (England)

== Wales vs United States ==
3 November 2013
14:00

Wales	16–24	United States
Try: Roets 16' m, 75' c Walker 77' c Goal: White (2/3) 76', 78'	Report	Try: Newton (2) 20' m, 63' c Petersen 33' m Paulo 54' m Samoa 60' c Goal: Paulo (2/5) 60', 64'

The Racecourse Ground, Wrexham
Attendance: 8,019
Referee: Ben Cummins (Australia)
Player of the Match: Joseph Paulo (United States)

FB	1	Rhys Evans
RW	2	Elliot Kear
RC	3	Ian Webster
LC	4	Christiaan Roets
LW	5	Rhys Williams
SO	6	Lloyd White
SH	7	Matt Seamark
PR	8	Craig Kopczak (c)
HK	9	Neil Budworth
PR	10	Jordan James
SR	11	Larne Patrick
SR	12	Tyson Frizell
LF	13	Ben Flower
Substitutes
IC	14	Gil Dudson
IC	15	Ben Evans
IC	16	Peter Lupton
IC	17	Anthony Walker
Coach:
(Wales) Iestyn Harris

FB	1	Kristian Freed
RW	2	Bureta Faraimo
RC	3	Lelauloto Tagaloa
LC	4	Taylor Welch
LW	5	Matt Petersen
SO	6	Joseph Paulo (c)
SH	7	Craig Priestly
PR	8	Mark Offerdahl
HK	9	Joel Luani
PR	10	Eddy Pettybourne
SR	11	Clint Newton
SR	12	Matt Shipway
LF	13	Daniel Howard
Substitutes
IC	14	Tui Samoa
IC	15	Roman Hifo
IC	16	Judah Lavulo
IC	17	Les Soloai
Coach:
(Australia) Terry Matterson

Touch Judges:
Clint Sharrad (England)
Joe Cobb (England)
Video Referee:
Phil Bentham (England)

== Wales vs Cook Islands ==
10 November 2013
14:00

Wales	24–28	Cook Islands
Try: Massam 14' m White 51' c Lloyd 67' c Roets (2) 60' m, 76' m Goal: White (1/3) 52'; Jones (1/2) 68'	Report	Try: Fepuleai 8' c K. Lulia 31' m John 39' c Peyroux 46' c Ford 72' c Goal: Taripo (4/5) 9', 40', 47', 73'

The Gnoll, Neath
Attendance: 3,270
Referee: Richard Silverwood (England)
Player of the Match: Elliot Kear (Wales)

FB	1	Elliot Kear
RW	2	Rob Massam
RC	3	Rhys Evans
LC	4	Rhodri Lloyd
LW	5	Christiaan Roets
SO	6	Danny Jones
SH	7	Peter Lupton
PR	8	Ben Flower
HK	9	Neil Budworth
PR	10	Jordan James
SR	11	Ross Divorty
SR	12	Tyson Frizell
LF	13	Larne Patrick
Substitutes
IC	14	Lloyd White
IC	15	Craig Kopczak (c)
IC	16	Gil Dudson
IC	17	Anthony Walker
Coach:
(Wales) Iestyn Harris

FB	1	Lulia Lulia
RW	2	Chris Taripo
RC	3	Brad Takairangi
LC	4	Keith Lulia
LW	5	Rea Pittman
SO	6	Jonathan Ford
SH	7	Isaac John
PR	8	Hercules Napa
HK	9	Daniel Fepuleai
PR	10	Zeb Taia (c)
SR	11	Tupou Sopoaga
SR	12	Dominique Peyroux
LF	13	Tinirau Arona
Substitutes
IC	14	Sam Brunton
IC	15	Anthony Gelling
IC	16	Joe Matapuku
IC	17	Adam Tangata
Coach:
(Australia) David Fairleigh

Touch Judges:
Chris Leatherbarrow (England)
Warren Turley (England)
Video Referee:
Ashley Klein (Australia)

== Wales vs Italy (Inter-group) ==
26 October 2013
16:30

Wales	16–32	Italy
Try: B. Evans 15' c Lloyd 38' c Kear 43' m Goal: White (2/3) 15', 38'	Report	Try: Guerra (2) 9' c, 21' c Mantellato 47' m Tedesco 69' m Centrone 71' m M. Minichiello 80' c Goal: Mantellato (4/7) 9', 22', 28', 80'

Millennium Stadium, Cardiff
Attendance: 45,052
Referee: Ashley Klein (Australia)
Player of the Match: Josh Mantellato (Italy)

FB	1	Rhys Evans
RW	2	Elliot Kear
RC	3	Rhodri Lloyd
LC	4	Ian Webster
LW	5	Rhys Williams
SO	6	Lloyd White
SH	7	Matt Seamark
PR	8	Craig Kopczak (c)
HK	9	Neil Budworth
PR	10	Ben Flower
SR	11	Ben Evans
SR	12	Tyson Frizell
LF	13	Larne Patrick
Substitutions:
IC	14	Gil Dudson
IC	15	Peter Lupton
IC	16	Jordan James
IC	17	Jacob Emmitt
Coach:
(Wales) Iestyn Harris

FB	1	Anthony Minichiello (c)
RW	2	Josh Mantellato
RC	3	James Tedesco
LC	4	Aidan Guerra
LW	5	Chris Centrone
SO	6	Ben Falcone
SH	7	Ryan Ghietti
PR	8	Anthony Laffranchi
HK	9	Dean Parata
PR	10	Paul Vaughan
SR	11	Mark Minichiello
SR	12	Cameron Ciraldo
LF	13	Joel Riethmuller
Substitutions:
IC	14	Sam Gardel
IC	15	Ryan Tramonte
IC	16	Brenden Santi
IC	17	Ray Nasso
Coach:
(Italy) Carlo Napolitano

Touch Judges:
Jamal Thompson (New Zealand)
Jose Pereira (France)
Video Referee:
Shayne Hayne (Australia)

Note: The match between Wales and Italy was an additional inter-group match.

== Tonga vs Cook Islands (Inter-group) ==
5 November 2013
20:00

Tonga	22–16	Cook Islands
Try: Fisiiahi 7' c Taumalolo 31' c Hurrell 39' m Taufua 62' m Goal: Langi (3/5) 7, 31', 37'	Report	Try: Taripo (3) 12' c, 19' m, 43' c Goal: Taripo (2/2) 12', 43'; Rapana (0/1)

Leigh Sports Village, Leigh
Attendance: 10,554
Referee: Ashley Klein (Australia)
Player of the Match: Chris Taripo (Cook Islands)

FB	1	Glen Fisiiahi
RW	2	Daniel Tupou
RC	3	Konrad Hurrell
LC	4	Mahe Fonua
LW	5	Jorge Taufua
SO	6	Samisoni Langi
SH	7	Daniel Foster
PR	8	Brent Kite (c)
HK	9	Pat Politoni
PR	10	Fuifui Moimoi
SR	11	Jason Taumalolo
SR	12	Sika Manu
LF	13	Mickey Paea
Substitutes
IC	14	Nafe Seluini
IC	15	Siosaia Vave
IC	16	Willie Manu
IC	17	Ukuma Ta'ai
Coach:
Charlie Tonga

FB	1	Drury Low
RW	2	Chris Taripo
RC	3	Brad Takairangi
LC	4	Keith Lulia
LW	5	Jordan Rapana
SO	6	Johnathon Ford
SH	7	Isaac John
PR	8	Hercules Napa
HK	9	Daniel Fepuleai
PR	10	Zane Tetevano
SR	11	Dominique Peyroux
SR	12	Zeb Taia (c)
LF	13	Tinirau Arona
Substitutes
IC	14	Hikule'o Malu
IC	15	Adam Tangata
IC	16	Joe Matapuku
IC	17	Sam Mataora
Coach:
(Australia) David Fairleigh

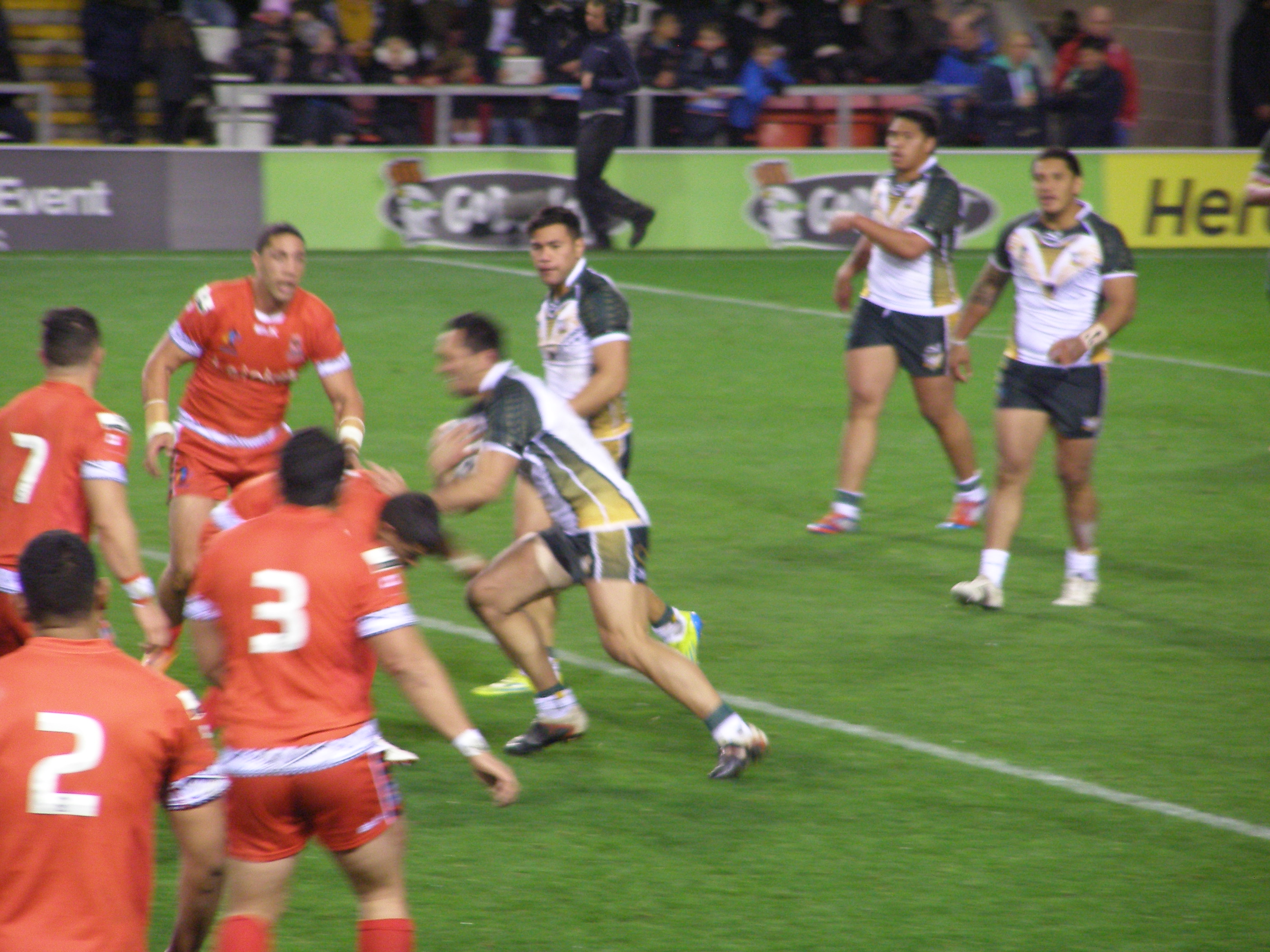

Touch Judges:
Warren Turley (England)
Matt Thomason (England)
Video Referee:
Richard Silverwood (England)

Note: The match between Tonga and Cook Islands is an additional inter-group match.

== Scotland vs United States (Inter-group) ==
7 November 2013
20:00

Scotland	22–8	United States
Try: Phillips 51' m Russell 55' c Douglas 63' c Hurst 80' c Goal: Brough (3/4) 55', 63', 80'	Report	Try: Freed 8' m Welch 23' m Goal: Paulo (0/2)

Salford City Stadium, Salford
Attendance: 6,041
Referee: Thierry Alibert (France)
Player of the Match: Matty Russell (Scotland)

FB	1	Matty Russell
RW	2	Alex Hurst
RC	3	Ben Hellewell
LC	4	Danny Addy
LW	5	David Scott
SO	6	Danny Brough
SH	7	Peter Wallace
PR	8	Adam Walker
HK	9	Andrew Henderson
PR	10	Luke Douglas
SR	11	Brett Phillips
SR	12	Dale Ferguson
LF	13	Ben Kavanagh
Substitutes
IC	14	Sam Barlow
IC	15	Alex Szostak
IC	16	Mitch Stringer
IC	17	Oliver Wilkes
Coach:
(England) Steve McCormack

FB	1	Kristian Freed
RW	2	Bureta Faraimo
RC	3	Taylor Welch
LC	4	Michael Garvey
LW	5	Matt Petersen
SO	6	Joseph Paulo
SH	7	Craig Priestly
PR	8	Mark Offerdahl
HK	9	Tui Samoa
PR	10	Eddy Pettybourne
SR	11	Clint Newton
SR	12	Matt Shipway
LF	13	Daniel Howard
Substitutes
IC	14	David Marando
IC	15	Roman Hifo
IC	16	Joel Luani
IC	17	Judah Lavulo
Coach:
(Australia) Terry Matterson

Touch Judges:
James Child (England)
Tim Roby (England)
Video Referee:
Henry Perenara (New Zealand)

Note: The match between Scotland and United States is an additional inter-group match.
