= 2013 Rugby League World Cup knockout stage =

The 2013 Rugby League World Cup knockout stage took place after the group stage of the 2013 Rugby League World Cup and culminated in the 2013 Rugby League World Cup final.

The quarter-finals consisted of eight teams; 1st, 2nd and 3rd from Group A and Group B, and the remaining two places being taken up by the winners of Group C and Group D.

== Bracket ==
Quarterfinals
A1 | Australia | 62
D1 | United States | 0
B2 | Samoa | 4
A3 | Fiji | 22
A2 | England | 34
B3 | France | 6
B1 | New Zealand | 40
C1 | Scotland | 4

Semifinals
A1 | Australia | 64
A3 | Fiji | 0
B1 | New Zealand | 20
A2 | England | 18

Finals
A1 | Australia | 34
B1 | New Zealand | 2

All times are local - British Summer Time (UTC+01 until 26 October, UTC+00 from 27 October) in British or Irish venues - Central European Summer Time (UTC+02 until 26 October, UTC+01/CET from 27 October)

== Quarter-finals ==
=== New Zealand vs Scotland ===
15 November 2013
20:00

| New Zealand | 40–4 | Scotland |
|---|---|---|
| Try: Goodwin (2) 8' m, 71' m Bromwich 15' c Tuivasa-Sheck (2) 20' m, 50' c Pritchard 27' c Johnson 30' c Vatuvei 58' m Goal: Johnson (4/8) 17, 28', 31', 51' | Report | Try: Hurst 67' m Goal: Brough (0/1) |

Headingley Carnegie Stadium, Leeds
Attendance: 16,207
Referee: Ben Cummins (Australia)
Player of the Match: Roger Tuivasa-Sheck (New Zealand)

| FB | 1 | Kevin Locke |
| RW | 2 | Roger Tuivasa-Sheck |
| RC | 3 | Dean Whare |
| LC | 4 | Bryson Goodwin |
| LW | 5 | Manu Vatuvei |
| SO | 6 | Kieran Foran |
| SH | 7 | Shaun Johnson |
| PR | 8 | Ben Matulino |
| HK | 9 | Isaac Luke |
| PR | 10 | Jesse Bromwich |
| SR | 11 | Frank Pritchard |
| SR | 12 | Sonny Bill Williams |
| LF | 13 | Simon Mannering (c) |
Substitutions:
| IC | 14 | Elijah Taylor |
| IC | 15 | Jared Waerea-Hargreaves |
| IC | 16 | Frank-Paul Nu'uausala |
| IC | 17 | Sam Moa |
Coach:
(New Zealand) Stephen Kearney

| FB | 1 | Matty Russell |
| RW | 2 | David Scott |
| RC | 3 | Ben Hellewell |
| LC | 4 | Kane Linnett |
| LW | 5 | Alex Hurst |
| SO | 6 | Danny Brough (c) |
| SH | 7 | Peter Wallace |
| PR | 8 | Adam Walker |
| HK | 9 | Ian Henderson |
| PR | 10 | Luke Douglas |
| SR | 11 | Danny Addy |
| SR | 12 | Brett Phillips |
| LF | 13 | Ben Kavanagh |
Substitutions:
| IC | 14 | Andrew Henderson |
| IC | 15 | Oliver Wilkes |
| IC | 16 | Alex Szostak |
| IC | 17 | Sam Barlow |
Coach:
(England) Steve McCormack

Touch Judges:
Jamal Thompson (New Zealand)
Robert Hicks (New Zealand)
Video Referee:
Shayne Hayne (Australia)

=== Australia vs United States ===
16 November 2013
13:00

| Australia | 62–0 | United States |
|---|---|---|
| Try: Hayne (4) 3' m, 57' c, 70' c, 79' c Inglis (2) 11' c, 50' c Morris (4) 21' m, 26' m, 35' m, 39' m Smith 23' c Cronk 28' c Goal: Thurston (7/12) 12', 23', 28', 50', 57', 70', 79' | Report |

The Racecourse Ground, Wrexham
Attendance: 5,762
Referee: Henry Perenara (New Zealand)
Player of the Match: Brett Morris

| FB | 1 | Billy Slater |
| RW | 2 | Brett Morris |
| RC | 3 | Jarryd Hayne |
| LC | 4 | Greg Inglis |
| LW | 5 | Darius Boyd |
| SO | 6 | Johnathan Thurston |
| SH | 7 | Cooper Cronk |
| PR | 8 | Matt Scott |
| HK | 9 | Cameron Smith (c) |
| PR | 10 | James Tamou |
| SR | 11 | Greg Bird |
| SR | 12 | Sam Thaiday |
| LF | 13 | Paul Gallen |
Substitutions:
| IC | 14 | Daly Cherry-Evans |
| IC | 15 | Josh Papalii |
| IC | 16 | Andrew Fifita |
| IC | 17 | Corey Parker |
Coach:
(Australia) Tim Sheens

| FB | 1 | Kristian Freed |
| RW | 2 | Bureta Faraimo |
| RC | 3 | Taylor Welch |
| LC | 4 | Michael Garvey |
| LW | 5 | Matt Petersen |
| SO | 6 | Joseph Paulo (c) |
| SH | 7 | Craig Priestly |
| PR | 8 | Mark Offerdahl |
| HK | 9 | Joel Luani |
| PR | 10 | Eddy Pettybourne |
| SR | 11 | Clint Newton |
| SR | 12 | Matt Shipway |
| LF | 13 | Daniel Howard |
Substitutions:
| IC | 14 | Tui Samoa |
| IC | 15 | Roman Hifo |
| IC | 16 | Mark Cantoni |
| IC | 17 | Les Soloai |
Coach:
(Australia) Terry Matterson

Touch Judges:
Jose Pereira (France)
Tim Roby (England)
Video Referee:
Phil Bentham (England)

=== England vs France ===
16 November 2013
20:00

| England | 34–6 | France |
|---|---|---|
| Try: Charnley (2) 11' c, 25' m Hall (2) 18' c, 28' c O'Loughlin 47' c Ferres 77' c Goal: Sinfield (5/6) 11', 18', 28', 47', 77' | Report | Duport 5' c Goal: Bosc (1/1) 5' |

DW Stadium, Wigan
Attendance: 22,276
Referee: Ashley Klein (Australia)
Player of the Match: Sam Tomkins

| FB | 1 | Sam Tomkins |
| RW | 2 | Josh Charnley |
| RC | 3 | Kallum Watkins |
| LC | 4 | Leroy Cudjoe |
| LW | 5 | Ryan Hall |
| SO | 6 | Rangi Chase |
| SH | 7 | Kevin Sinfield (c) |
| PR | 8 | James Graham |
| HK | 9 | Michael McIlorum |
| PR | 10 | Chris Hill |
| SR | 11 | Sam Burgess |
| SR | 12 | Ben Westwood |
| LF | 13 | Sean O'Loughlin |
Substitutions:
| IC | 14 | James Roby |
| IC | 15 | Brett Ferres |
| IC | 16 | George Burgess |
| IC | 17 | Liam Farrell |
Coach:
(England) Steve McNamara

| FB | 1 | Morgan Escaré |
| RW | 2 | Damien Cardace |
| RC | 3 | Jean-Philippe Baile |
| LC | 4 | Vincent Duport |
| LW | 5 | Clint Greenshields |
| SO | 6 | Thomas Bosc |
| SH | 7 | William Barthau |
| PR | 8 | Jamal Fakir |
| HK | 9 | Kane Bentley |
| PR | 10 | Rémi Casty |
| SR | 11 | Olivier Elima |
| SR | 12 | Sébastien Raguin |
| LF | 13 | Gregory Mounis |
Substitutions:
| IC | 14 | Éloi Pélissier |
| IC | 15 | Younes Khattabi |
| IC | 16 | Antoni Maria |
| IC | 17 | Michael Simon |
Coach:
(England) Richard Agar

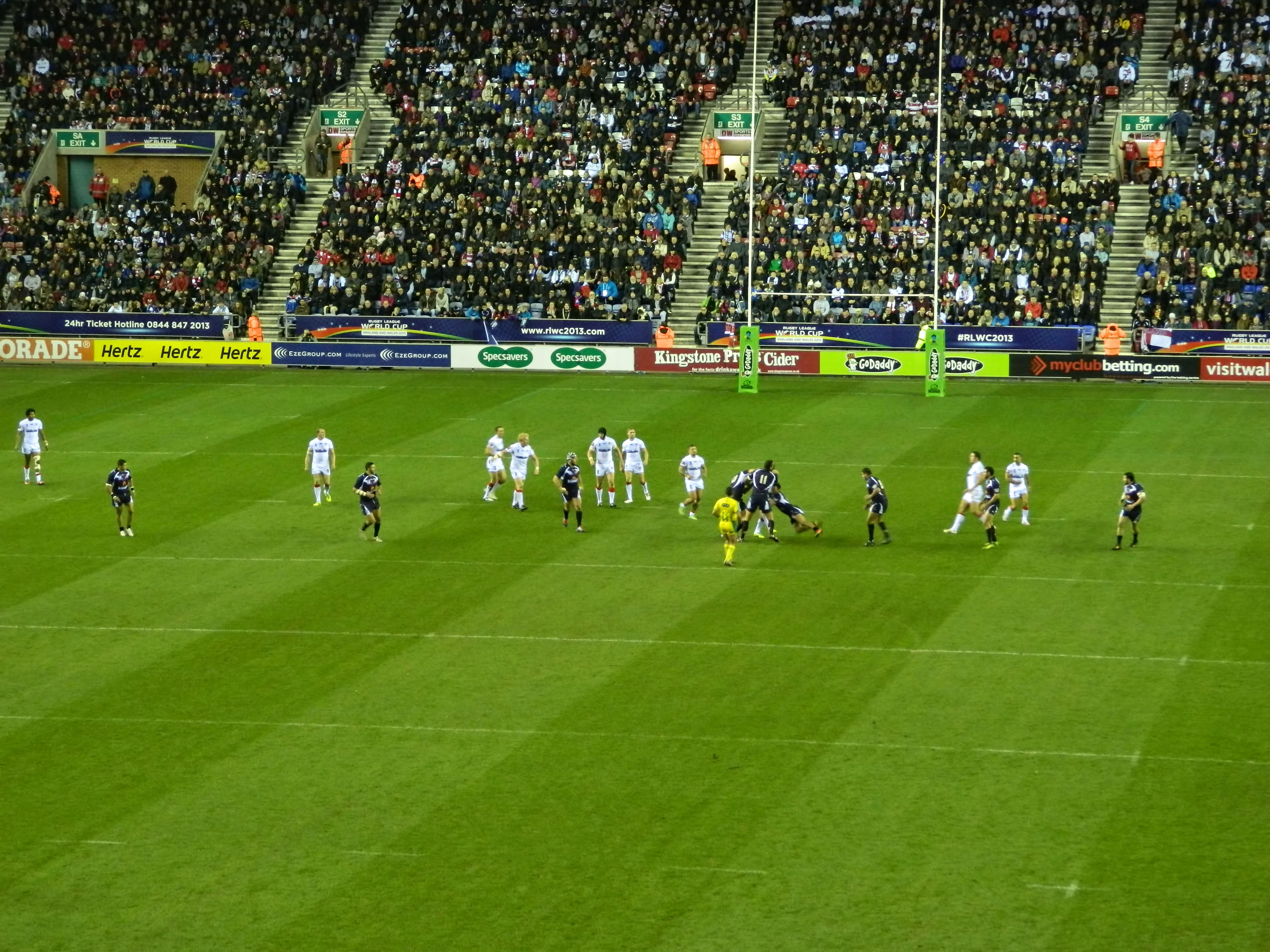

Touch Judges:
Grant Atkins (Australia)
James Child (England)
Video Referee:
Ben Thaler (England)

=== Samoa vs Fiji ===
17 November 2013
15:00

| Samoa | 4–22 | Fiji |
|---|---|---|
| Try: Winterstein 58' m | Report | Try: Groom 5' c W. Naiqama 32' c Roqica 78' c Goal: W. Naiqama (5/5) 5', 8', 32', 71', 78' |

Halliwell Jones Stadium, Warrington
Attendance: 12,766
Referee: Richard Silverwood (England)
Player of the Match: Aaron Groom

| FB | 1 | Anthony Milford |
| RW | 2 | Antonio Winterstein |
| RC | 3 | Tim Lafai |
| LC | 4 | Joseph Leilua |
| LW | 5 | Daniel Vidot |
| SO | 6 | Penani Manumalealii |
| SH | 7 | Ben Roberts |
| PR | 8 | David Fa'alogo |
| HK | 9 | Pita Godinet |
| PR | 10 | Suaia Matagi |
| SR | 11 | Iosia Soliola (c) |
| SR | 12 | Tony Puletua |
| LF | 13 | Sauaso Sue |
Substitutions:
| IC | 14 | Michael Sio |
| IC | 15 | Junior Moors |
| IC | 16 | Mark Taufua |
| IC | 17 | Mose Masoe |
Coach:
(Australia) Matt Parish

| FB | 1 | Kevin Naiqama |
| RW | 2 | Marika Koroibete |
| RC | 3 | Sisa Waqa |
| LC | 4 | Wes Naiqama |
| LW | 5 | Akuila Uate |
| SO | 6 | Daryl Millard |
| SH | 7 | Aaron Groom |
| PR | 8 | Ashton Sims |
| HK | 9 | James Storer |
| PR | 10 | Petero Civoniceva (c) |
| SR | 11 | Tariq Sims |
| SR | 12 | Jason Bukuya |
| LF | 13 | Eloni Vunakece |
Substitutions:
| IC | 14 | Apisai Koroisau |
| IC | 15 | Vitale Junior Roqica |
| IC | 16 | Kane Evans |
| IC | 17 | Semi Radradra |
Coach:
(Australia) Rick Stone

Touch Judges:
Clint Sharrad (England)
Joe Cobb (England)
Video Referee:
Phil Bentham (England)

== Semi-final ==
=== New Zealand vs England ===
23 November 2013
13:00

| New Zealand | 20–18 | England |
|---|---|---|
| Try: Tuivasa-Sheck (2) 31' c, 44' m Johnson 80' c Goal: Johnson (4/5) 33', 38', 53' 80' | Report | Try: O'Loughlin 16' c Watkins 58' m S. Burgess 67' c Goal: Sinfield (3/4) 17', 25', 68' |

Wembley Stadium, London
Attendance: 67,545
Referee: Ben Cummins (Australia)
Player of the Match: Sam Burgess

| FB | 1 | Kevin Locke |
| RW | 2 | Roger Tuivasa-Sheck |
| RC | 3 | Dean Whare |
| LC | 4 | Bryson Goodwin |
| LW | 5 | Jason Nightingale |
| SO | 6 | Kieran Foran |
| SH | 7 | Shaun Johnson |
| PR | 8 | Jared Waerea-Hargreaves |
| HK | 9 | Isaac Luke |
| PR | 10 | Jesse Bromwich |
| SR | 11 | Sonny Bill Williams |
| SR | 12 | Simon Mannering (c) |
| LF | 13 | Elijah Taylor |
Substitutions:
| IC | 14 | Frank-Paul Nu'uausala |
| IC | 15 | Sam Kasiano |
| IC | 16 | Ben Matulino |
| IC | 17 | Alex Glenn |
Coach:
(New Zealand) Stephen Kearney

| FB | 1 | Sam Tomkins |
| RW | 2 | Josh Charnley |
| RC | 3 | Kallum Watkins |
| LC | 4 | Leroy Cudjoe |
| LW | 5 | Ryan Hall |
| SO | 6 | Gareth Widdop |
| SH | 7 | Kevin Sinfield (c) |
| PR | 8 | James Graham |
| HK | 9 | James Roby |
| PR | 10 | Sam Burgess |
| SR | 11 | Brett Ferres |
| SR | 12 | Ben Westwood |
| LF | 13 | Sean O'Loughlin |
Substitutions:
| IC | 14 | Rob Burrow |
| IC | 15 | George Burgess |
| IC | 16 | Chris Hill |
| IC | 17 | Carl Ablett |
Coach:
(England) Steve McNamara

Touch Judges:
James Child (England)
Grant Atkins (Australia)
Video Referee:
Ashley Klein (Australia)

=== Australia vs Fiji ===
23 November 2013
15:30

| Australia | 64–0 | Fiji |
|---|---|---|
| Try: Thurston 9' c Darius Boyd (2) 15' m, 59' c Cronk 19' c Hayne (3) 22' c, 37' c, 68' c Papalii 35'c Tamou 53' c Morris 72' c Fifita 79' c Goal: Thurston (10/11) 10', 20', 23', 36', 39', 55', 60', 69', 73', 80' | Report |

Wembley Stadium, London
Attendance: 67,545
Referee: Richard Silverwood (England)
Player of the Match: Johnathan Thurston

| FB | 1 | Greg Inglis |
| RW | 2 | Brett Morris |
| RC | 3 | Brent Tate |
| LC | 4 | Jarryd Hayne |
| LW | 5 | Darius Boyd |
| SO | 6 | Johnathan Thurston |
| SH | 7 | Cooper Cronk |
| PR | 8 | Matt Scott |
| HK | 9 | Cameron Smith (c) |
| PR | 10 | James Tamou |
| SR | 11 | Greg Bird |
| SR | 12 | Sam Thaiday |
| LF | 13 | Paul Gallen |
Substitutions:
| IC | 14 | Daly Cherry-Evans |
| IC | 15 | Josh Papalii |
| IC | 16 | Andrew Fifita |
| IC | 17 | Corey Parker |
Coach:
(Australia) Tim Sheens

| FB | 1 | Kevin Naiqama |
| RW | 2 | Marika Koroibete |
| RC | 3 | Sisa Waqa |
| LC | 4 | Wes Naiqama |
| LW | 5 | Akuila Uate |
| SO | 6 | Daryl Millard |
| SH | 7 | Aaron Groom |
| PR | 8 | Ashton Sims |
| HK | 9 | James Storer |
| PR | 10 | Petero Civoniceva (c) |
| SR | 11 | Tariq Sims |
| SR | 12 | Jason Bukuya |
| LF | 13 | Eloni Vunakece |
Substitutions:
| IC | 14 | Apisai Koroisau |
| IC | 15 | Vitale Junior Roqica |
| IC | 16 | Kane Evans |
| IC | 17 | Semi Radradra |
Coach:
(Australia) Rick Stone

Touch Judges:
Robert Hicks (New Zealand)
Tim Roby (England)
Video Referee:
Ben Thaler (England)

== Final: New Zealand vs Australia ==
30 November 2013
14:30

| New Zealand | 2–34 | Australia |
|---|---|---|
| Goal: Johnson (1/1) 16' | Report | Try: Slater (2) 19' c, 41' c Cronk 30' c B. Morris (2) 52' c, 72' c Goal: Thurston (7/7) 4', 19', 30', 35', 41', 52', 72' |

Old Trafford, Manchester
Attendance: 74,468
Referee: Richard Silverwood (England)
Player of the Match: Johnathan Thurston

| FB | 1 | Kevin Locke |
| RW | 2 | Roger Tuivasa-Sheck |
| RC | 3 | Dean Whare |
| LC | 4 | Bryson Goodwin |
| LW | 5 | Manu Vatuvei |
| SO | 6 | Kieran Foran |
| SH | 7 | Shaun Johnson |
| PR | 8 | Jared Waerea-Hargreaves |
| HK | 9 | Isaac Luke |
| PR | 10 | Jesse Bromwich |
| SR | 11 | Simon Mannering (c) |
| SR | 12 | Sonny Bill Williams |
| LF | 13 | Elijah Taylor |
Substitutions:
| IC | 14 | Frank-Paul Nu'uausala |
| IC | 15 | Sam Kasiano |
| IC | 16 | Ben Matulino |
| IC | 17 | Alex Glenn |
Coach:
(New Zealand) Stephen Kearney

| FB | 1 | Billy Slater |
| RW | 2 | Brett Morris |
| RC | 3 | Greg Inglis |
| LC | 4 | Jarryd Hayne |
| LW | 5 | Darius Boyd |
| SO | 6 | Johnathan Thurston |
| SH | 7 | Cooper Cronk |
| PR | 8 | Matt Scott |
| HK | 9 | Cameron Smith (c) |
| PR | 10 | James Tamou |
| SR | 11 | Greg Bird |
| SR | 12 | Sam Thaiday |
| LF | 13 | Paul Gallen |
Substitutions:
| IC | 14 | Daly Cherry-Evans |
| IC | 15 | Josh Papalii |
| IC | 16 | Andrew Fifita |
| IC | 17 | Corey Parker |
Coach:
(Australia) Tim Sheens

Touch Judges:
James Child (England)
Grant Atkins (Australia)
Video Referee:
Ashley Klein (Australia)
