= International rugby league in 2013 =

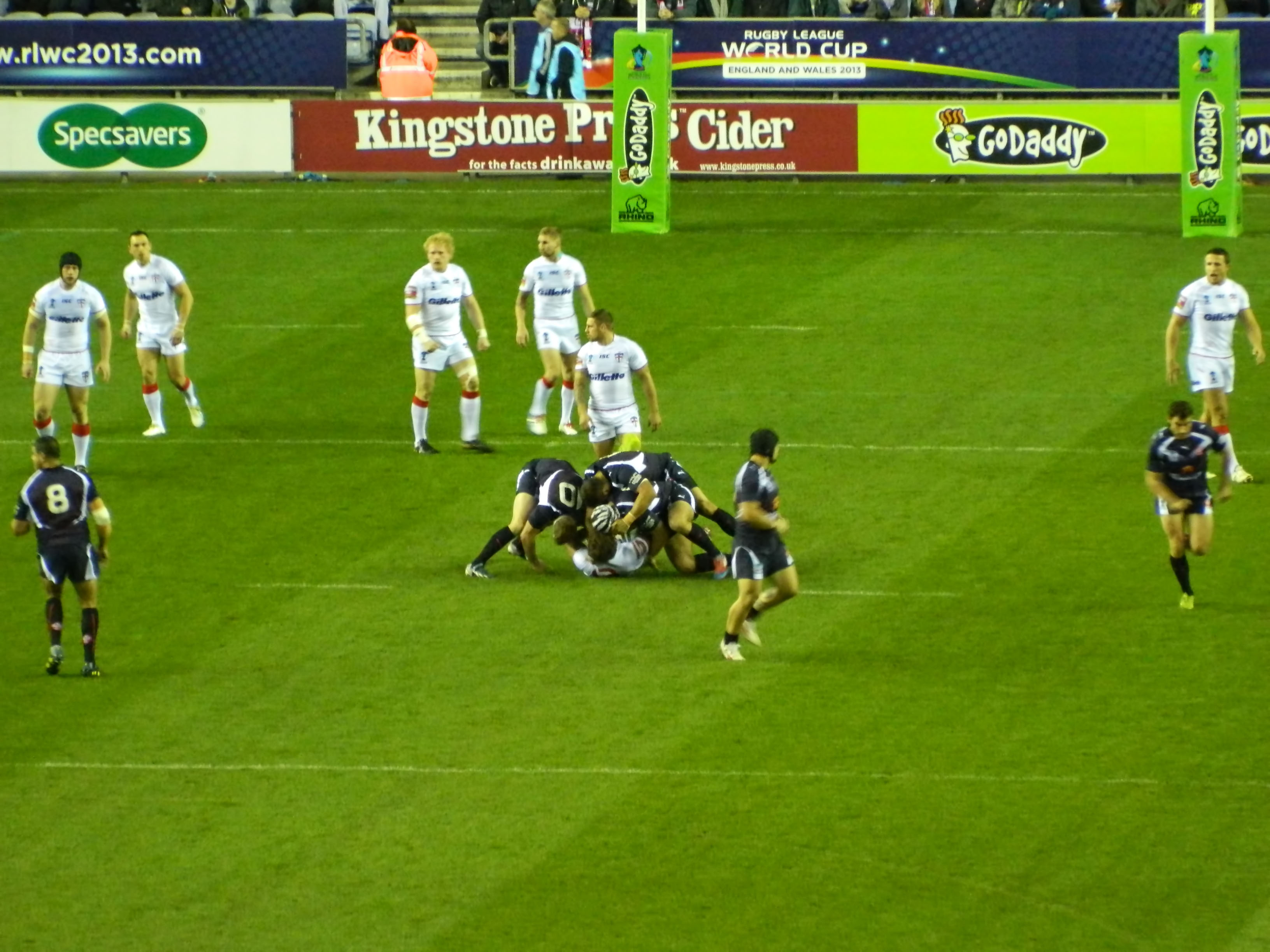
- England against France in the Rugby League World Cup quarter final

This is a list of international rugby league matches played throughout 2013. A † denotes a recognised, but unofficial match that did not contribute to the IRL World Rankings.

== April ==
=== Anzac Test ===
19 April 2013

Australia	32–12	New Zealand
Tries: Cooper Cronk (5'); Greg Inglis (50'); Brett Morris (53'); Luke Lewis (58'); Darius Boyd (61'); Justin Hodges (72'); Goals: Cameron Smith (5/5 – 5', 50', 53', 58', 61', 72')		Tries: Josh Hoffman (40'); Frank Pritchard (77'); Goals: Shaun Johnson (2/2 – 40', 77')

GIO Stadium, Canberra
Attendance: 25,628
Referee: Ashley Klein (Australia)
Player of the Match: Cameron Smith

=== Polynesian Cup ===
20 April 2013
19:30 (AEST)

Samoa	4 – 36	Tonga
Try: Vidot 27' m Goal: Roberts (0/1)	Video	Try: Langi (2) 4' c, 73' c Likiliki (2) 11' m, 42' m Fonua (2) 63' c, 79' (not attempted); Uaisele 59' c Goal: Langi (4/6) 4', 59', 63', 73'

== June ==
=== International Origin ===
14 June 2013

England	30 – 10	Exiles
Tries: Hardaker, Roby, Cudjoe (2), Tomkins; Goals: Sinfield 4/4, Charnley 1/1	(Report)	Tries: Paea, Monaghan; Goals: Richards 1/2

Halliwell Jones Stadium, Warrington, England
Attendance: 7,926
Referee: Richard Silverwood
Player of the Match: Sam Tomkins (England)

== July ==
=== European Bowl ===
6 July 2013

Ukraine	42–14	Norway
Tries: Kravchenko, Korobov (4), Troyan (2), Felkov (2); Conv: Romanko (3)	(Report)	Tries: Hakonsen, I. Schmidt, Engeland; Conv: Engeland (1)

Dinamo Stadium, Kharkiv

13 July 2013

Norway	26–14	Czech Republic
Tries: Mellor, Davidson, Sundsfjord, Linnestå, Schmidt; Conv: Granly Meldalen (1)	(Report)	Tries: Zemánek, Cintler, Čáslavka; Conv: Buben (1)

Bislett Stadium, Oslo

28 September 2013

Czech Republic	4–68	Ukraine
Goals: Sedina (2)	(Report)	Tries: Troyan (4), Mashkin (2), Shaskov (3), Mazepa, Romanko, Skorbach, Pojidaev; Conv: Skorbach (5), Romanko (3)

Municipal Stadium, Vrchlabí

== October ==
=== World Cup warm-up games ===
18 October 2013

France	18–22	United States

Stade des Minimes, Toulouse

19 October 2013

Rochdale Hornets	0–78	Fiji

Spotland Stadium, Rochdale

19 October 2013

England	14–15	Italy

AJ Bell Stadium, Salford

19 October 2013

England Knights	52–16	Samoa

AJ Bell Stadium, Salford

19 October 2013

Papua New Guinea	38–20	Scotland

Post Office Road, Featherstone

20 October 2013

New Zealand	50–0	Cook Islands

Keepmoat Stadium, Doncaster

=== World Cup ===
==== Group A ====
Team	Pld	W	D	L	TF	PF	PA	+/−	Pts
Australia	3	3	0	0	20	112	22	+90	6
England	3	2	0	1	18	96	40	+56	4
Fiji	3	1	0	2	8	46	82	–36	2
Ireland	3	0	0	3	3	14	124	–110	0

26 October 2013
14:30

Australia	28–20	England
Try: Thurston 27' c Bird 37' c Slater 40' c B. Morris 44' m Boyd 71' m Goal: Thurston (4/6) 27', 37', 40', 64'	Report	Try: Hall 8' m Cudjoe 20' c G. Burgess 51' c Charnley 76' m Goal: Sinfield (2/4) 20', 51'

Millennium Stadium, Cardiff
Attendance: 45,052
Referee: Henry Perenara (New Zealand)
Player of the Match: Johnathan Thurston (Australia)

28 October 2013
20:00

Fiji	32–14	Ireland
Try: Uate (3) 9' m, 64 m, 71 m K. Naiqama 12' c T. Sims 52' c K. Sims 65' m Goal: W. Naiqama (4/7) 12', 38', 52', 65'	Report	Try: McCarthy 23' m Blanch 76' m Hasson 79' c Goal: Richards (1/3) 80'

Spotland Stadium, Rochdale
Attendance: 8,872
Referee: Phil Bentham (England)
Player of the Match: Kevin Naiqama (Fiji)

2 November 2013
14:30

England	42–0	Ireland
Try: Hall (3) 2' m, 13' c, 22' m Briscoe (2) 17' m, 19' c Ferres 24' c Watkins 57' c Chase 69' c Goal: Sinfield (4/7) 14', 20', 24', 57'; Widdop (1/1) 69'	Report

John Smith's Stadium, Huddersfield
Attendance: 24,375*
Referee: Thierry Alibert (France)
Player of the Match: Ryan Hall (England)

2 November 2013
20:00

Australia	34–2	Fiji
Try: Papalii 15'c Boyd 21' m Jennings 31' c Morris 42' c Cherry-Evans 52' c Lewis 66' c Goal: Thurston (5/6) 15', 31', 42', 52', 67'	Report	Goal: Noilea (1/1) 7'

Langtree Park, St. Helens
Attendance: 14,137
Referee: Richard Silverwood (England)
Player of the Match: Johnathan Thurston (Australia)

9 November 2013
14:30

England	34–12	Fiji
Try: Westwood 38' c S. Burgess 41' c Ferres 44' c Hall (2) 49' c, 56' m Burrow 53' c Goal: Sinfield (5/6) 38', 43', 45', 49', 53'	Report	Try: Vunakece 33' c Radradra 72' c Goal: Naiqama (2/2) 34', 73'

KC Stadium, Hull
Attendance: 25,114
Referee: Ben Cummins (Australia)
Player of the Match: Sam Burgess (England)

9 November 2013
20:00

Australia	50–0	Ireland
Try: Hayne (2) 2' m, 76' c Cronk (2) 11' c, 57' c Bird 29' c Morris 32' c Slater 40' m Cherry-Evans 60' c Fifita 65' c Goal: Smith (3/5) 11', 30', 33'; Parker (4/4) 57', 60', 66', 76'	Report

Thomond Park, Limerick
Attendance: 5,021
Referee: Phil Bentham (England)
Player of the Match: Daly Cherry-Evans

==== Group B ====
Team	Pld	W	D	L	TF	PF	PA	+/−	Pts
New Zealand	3	3	0	0	26	146	34	+112	6
Samoa	3	2	0	1	14	84	52	+32	4
France	3	1	0	2	2	15	78	–63	2
Papua New Guinea	3	0	0	3	5	22	103	–81	0

27 October 2013
16:00

Papua New Guinea	8–9	France
Try: MacDonald 17' m Abavu 42' m Goal: Mead (0/3)	Report	Try: Bosc 6' c Goal: Bosc (2/2) 7', 60'; Drop Goal: Barthau (1/1) 64'

MS3 Craven Park, Hull
Attendance: 7,481
Referee: Ben Cummins (Australia)
Player of the Match: William Barthau (France)

27 October 2013
18:00

New Zealand	42–24	Samoa
Try: Hoffman 11' c Mannering (2) 15' c, 22' c Tuivasa-Sheck 17' m Vatuvei (3) 43' m, 49' m, 73' c Luke 45' c Goal: Johnson (5/8) 10', 15', 23', 46', 73'	Report	Try: Roberts 39' m Leilua 52' m Manumalealii 57' m Matagi 60' c A. Winterstein 65' c Goal: Milford (2/5) 61', 65'

Halliwell Jones Stadium, Warrington
Attendance: 14,965
Referee: Richard Silverwood (England)
Player of the Match: Dean Whare (New Zealand)

1 November 2013
20:00

New Zealand	48–0	France
Try: Inu 6' c Goodwin 24' c Nu'uausala (2) 39' c, 75' c Johnson (2) 51' c, 55' c Eastwood 65' c Tuivasa-Sheck 80' c Goal: Johnson (8/8) 7', 26', 39', 51', 56', 66', 76', 80'	Report

Parc des Sports, Avignon
Attendance: 17,518
Referee: Phil Bentham (England)
Player of the Match: Shaun Johnson (New Zealand)

4 November 2013
20:00

Papua New Guinea	4–38	Samoa
Try: Nandye 45' m Goal: Eliab (0/1)	Report	Try: Matagi 2' c A. Winterstein (3) 9' m, 25' c, 79' m Godinet 15' c Roberts 37' c Sue 61' c Goal: Milford (5/7) 2', 15', 25', 38', 61'

MS3 Craven Park, Hull
Attendance: 6,871
Referee: Shayne Hayne (Australia)
Player of the Match: Anthony Milford (Samoa)

8 November 2013
20:00

New Zealand	56–10	Papua New Guinea
Try: Goodwin 4' c Tuivasa-Sheck (2) 7' c, 11' c Williams (3) 15' c, 27' c, 40' c Nu'uausala 30' m Whare (2) 50' c, 56' c Taylor 67' m Goal: Johnson (8/10) 4', 8', 12', 16', 28', 40', 51', 58'	Report	Try: Aiye 41' c Albert 78' m Goal: Paniu (1/2) 43'

Headingley Carnegie Stadium, Leeds
Attendance: 18,180
Referee: Ashley Klein (Australia)
Player of the Match: Sonny Bill Williams (New Zealand)

11 November 2013
20:00

France	6–22	Samoa
Try: Escaré 32' c Goal: Bosc 33'	Report	Try: Vidot 4' c Milford 46' c Godinet 61' m Moors 74' c Goal: Milford (3/4) 4', 47', 75'

Stade Gilbert Brutus, Perpignan
Attendance: 11,576
Referee: Henry Perenara (New Zealand)
Player of the Match: Anthony Milford (Samoa)

==== Group C ====
Team	Pld	W	D	L	TF	PF	PA	+/−	Pts
Scotland	3	2	1	0	13	78	62	+16	5
Tonga	3	2	0	1	12	62	42	+20	4
Italy	3	1	1	1	11	62	62	0	3

29 October 2013
20:00

Tonga	24–26	Scotland
Try: Fisiiahi 9' m S. Manu (2) 41' c, 56 m Seluini 49' m W. Manu 61' c Goal: Langi (2/5) 43', 62'	Report	Try: Russell (2) 13' c, 72 c Fisher 32' c Carter 38' c Goal: Brough (5/6) 14', 20', 32', 39', 72'

Derwent Park, Workington
Attendance: 7,630
Referee: Shayne Hayne (Australia)
Player of the Match: Sika Manu (Tonga)

3 November 2013
16:00

Scotland	30–30	Italy
Try: Russell 20' c Linnett 25' c Addy 41' c Hellewell (2) 49' c, 69' m Goal: Brough (5/6) 14', 21', 25', 41', 49'	Report	Try: Ciraldo 31' c Nasso (2) 37' c, 45' c Centrone 52' c A. Minichiello 58' c Goal: Mantellato (5/5) 31', 37', 45', 53', 58'

Derwent Park, Workington
Attendance: 7,280
Referee: Henry Perenara (New Zealand)
Player of the Match: Ray Nasso (Italy)

10 November 2013
16:00

Tonga	16–0	Italy
Try: Manu 47' c Foster 64' m Terepo 79' m Goal: Langi (2/3) 40', 48'	Report

The Shay, Halifax
Attendance: 10,266
Referee: Ben Thaler (England)
Player of the Match: Fuifui Moimoi (Tonga)

==== Group D ====
Team	Pld	W	D	L	TF	PF	PA	+/−	Pts
United States	3	2	0	1	13	64	58	+6	4
Cook Islands	3	1	0	2	12	64	78	–14	2
Wales	3	0	0	3	11	56	84	–28	0

30 October 2013
20:00

United States	32–20	Cook Islands
Try: Faraimo 13' m Petersen 16' m Joseph Paulo 42' m Samoa 59' c Offerdahl 71' c Priestley 73' c Goal: Joseph Paulo (4/8) 25', 59', 74', 77'	Report	Try: Takairangi 3' c Low 36' m Lulia 47' m Peyroux 62' c Goal: Rapana (2/4) 4', 63'

Memorial Stadium, Bristol
Attendance: 7,247
Referee: Ben Thaler (England)
Player of the Match: Joseph Paulo (United States)

3 November 2013
14:00

Wales	16–24	United States
Try: Roets 16' m, 75' c Walker 77' c Goal: White (2/3) 76', 78'	Report	Try: Newton (2) 20' m, 63' c Petersen 33' m Paulo 54' m Samoa 60' c Goal: Paulo (2/5) 60', 64'

The Racecourse Ground, Wrexham
Attendance: 8,019
Referee: Ben Cummins (Australia)
Player of the Match: Joseph Paulo (United States)

10 November 2013
14:00

Wales	24–28	Cook Islands
Try: Massam 14' m White 51' c Lloyd 67' c Roets (2) 60' m, 76' m Goal: White (1/3) 52'; Jones (1/2) 68'	Report	Try: Fepuleai 8' c K. Lulia 31' m John 39' c Peyroux 46' c Ford 72' c Goal: Taripo (4/5) 9', 40', 47', 73'

The Gnoll, Neath
Attendance: 3,270
Referee: Richard Silverwood (England)
Player of the Match: Elliot Kear (Wales)

==== Inter-group matches ====
26 October 2013
16:30

Wales	16–32	Italy
Try: B. Evans 15' c Lloyd 38' c Kear 43' m Goal: White (2/3) 15', 38'	Report	Try: Guerra (2) 9' c, 21' c Mantellato 47' m Tedesco 69' m Centrone 71' m M. Minichiello 80' c Goal: Mantellato (4/7) 9', 22', 28', 80'

Millennium Stadium, Cardiff
Attendance: 45,052
Referee: Ashley Klein (Australia)
Player of the Match: Josh Mantellato (Italy)

5 November 2013
20:00

Tonga	22–16	Cook Islands
Try: Fisiiahi 7' c Taumalolo 31' c Hurrell 39' m Taufua 62' m Goal: Langi (3/5) 7, 31', 37'	Report	Try: Taripo (3) 12' c, 19' m, 43' c Goal: Taripo (2/2) 12', 43'; Rapana (0/1)

Leigh Sports Village, Leigh
Attendance: 10,554
Referee: Ashley Klein (Australia)
Player of the Match: Chris Taripo (Cook Islands)

7 November 2013
20:00

Scotland	22–8	United States
Try: Phillips 51' m Russell 55' c Douglas 63' c Hurst 80' c Goal: Brough (3/4) 55', 63', 80'	Report	Try: Freed 8' m Welch 23' m Goal: Paulo (0/2)

Salford City Stadium, Salford
Attendance: 6,041
Referee: Thierry Alibert (France)
Player of the Match: Matty Russell (Scotland)

==== Knockout stage ====
===== Quarter-finals =====
15 November 2013
20:00

New Zealand	40–4	Scotland
Try: Goodwin (2) 8' m, 71' m Bromwich 15' c Tuivasa-Sheck (2) 20' m, 50' c Pritchard 27' c Johnson 30' c Vatuvei 58' m Goal: Johnson (4/8) 17, 28', 31', 51'	Report	Try: Hurst 67' m Goal: Brough (0/1)

Headingley Carnegie Stadium, Leeds
Attendance: 16,207
Referee: Ben Cummins (Australia)
Player of the Match: Roger Tuivasa-Sheck (New Zealand)

16 November 2013
13:00

Australia	62–0	United States
Try: Hayne (4) 3' m, 57' c, 70' c, 79' c Inglis (2) 11' c, 50' c Morris (4) 21' m, 26' m, 35' m, 39' m Smith 23' c Cronk 28' c Goal: Thurston (7/12) 12', 23', 28', 50', 57', 70', 79'	Report

The Racecourse Ground, Wrexham
Attendance: 5,762
Referee: Henry Perenara (New Zealand)
Player of the Match: Brett Morris

16 November 2013
20:00

England	34–6	France
Try: Charnley (2) 11' c, 25' m Hall (2) 18' c, 28' c O'Loughlin 47' c Ferres 77' c Goal: Sinfield (5/6) 11', 18', 28', 47', 77'	Report	Duport 5' c Goal: Bosc (1/1) 5'

DW Stadium, Wigan
Attendance: 22,276
Referee: Ashley Klein (Australia)
Player of the Match: Sam Tomkins

17 November 2013
15:00

Samoa	4–22	Fiji
Try: Winterstein 58' m	Report	Try: Groom 5' c W. Naiqama 32' c Roqica 78' c Goal: W. Naiqama (5/5) 5', 8', 32', 71', 78'

Halliwell Jones Stadium, Warrington
Attendance: 12,766
Referee: Richard Silverwood (England)
Player of the Match: Aaron Groom

===== Semi-finals =====
23 November 2013
13:00

New Zealand	20–18	England
Try: Tuivasa-Sheck (2) 31' c, 44' m Johnson 80' c Goal: Johnson (4/5) 33', 38', 53' 80'	Report	Try: O'Loughlin 16' c Watkins 58' m S. Burgess 67' c Goal: Sinfield (3/4) 17', 25', 68'

Wembley Stadium, London
Attendance: 67,545
Referee: Ben Cummins (Australia)
Player of the Match: Sam Burgess

23 November 2013
15:30

Australia	64–0	Fiji
Try: Thurston 9' c Darius Boyd (2) 15' m, 59' c Cronk 19' c Hayne (3) 22' c, 37' c, 68' c Papalii 35'c Tamou 53' c Morris 72' c Fifita 79' c Goal: Thurston (10/11) 10', 20', 23', 36', 39', 55', 60', 69', 73', 80'	Report

Wembley Stadium, London
Attendance: 67,545
Referee: Richard Silverwood (England)
Player of the Match: Johnathan Thurston

===== Final =====
30 November 2013
14:30

New Zealand	2–34	Australia
Tries: Goals: Shaun Johnson (1/1) 16'	Report	Tries: Billy Slater (2) 19' c, 41' c Cooper Cronk 30' c Brett Morris (2) 52' c, 72' c Goals: Johnathan Thurston (7/7) 4', 19', 30', 35', 41', 52', 72'

Old Trafford, Manchester
Attendance: 74,468
Referee: Richard Silverwood (England)
Player of the Match: Johnathan Thurston (Australia)
