= Tangata =

Tangata may refer to:

- Tangata (spider), a genus of spiders in the family Orsolobidae
- Tangata whenua
- Tangata manu
- Adam Tangata (born 1991), Cook Islands professional rugby league footballer
- Tangata Vavia (born 1949)
