= Ilisavani Jegesa =

Fiji international rugby league footballer

Personal information
- Born: 22 November 1988 (age 36); Rakiraki, Kadavu Province, Fiji
- Height: 176 cm (5 ft 9 in)
- Weight: 102 kg (16 st 1 lb)

Playing information
- Position: Centre
Representative
Years	Team	Pld	T	G	FG	P
2013	Fiji	0	0	0	0	0

Ilisavani Jegesa is a Fijian rugby league international footballer who plays as a centre for Nabua Broncos and Kaiviti Silktails. He stays with his family in Nabua. He dropped out from school when he was in class six. "Joining the Fiji Bati to the world cup is really an honour," he said. He also represents Nabua in 7's and XV.

== Playing career ==
Born in Rakiraki, a district in the Kadavu Province of Fiji, Jegesa started his career as a rugby union player. He later switched to rugby league, playing for the City Storm before moving to Nabua Broncos.

== Representative career ==
He was named in the Fiji squad for the 2013 Rugby League World Cup.

== Personal life ==
Jegesa is the cousin of Nemani Suguturaga, who was selected in Fiji's squad for the 2008 Rugby League World Cup.
