= Anthony Gelling =

Cook Islands international rugby league footballer

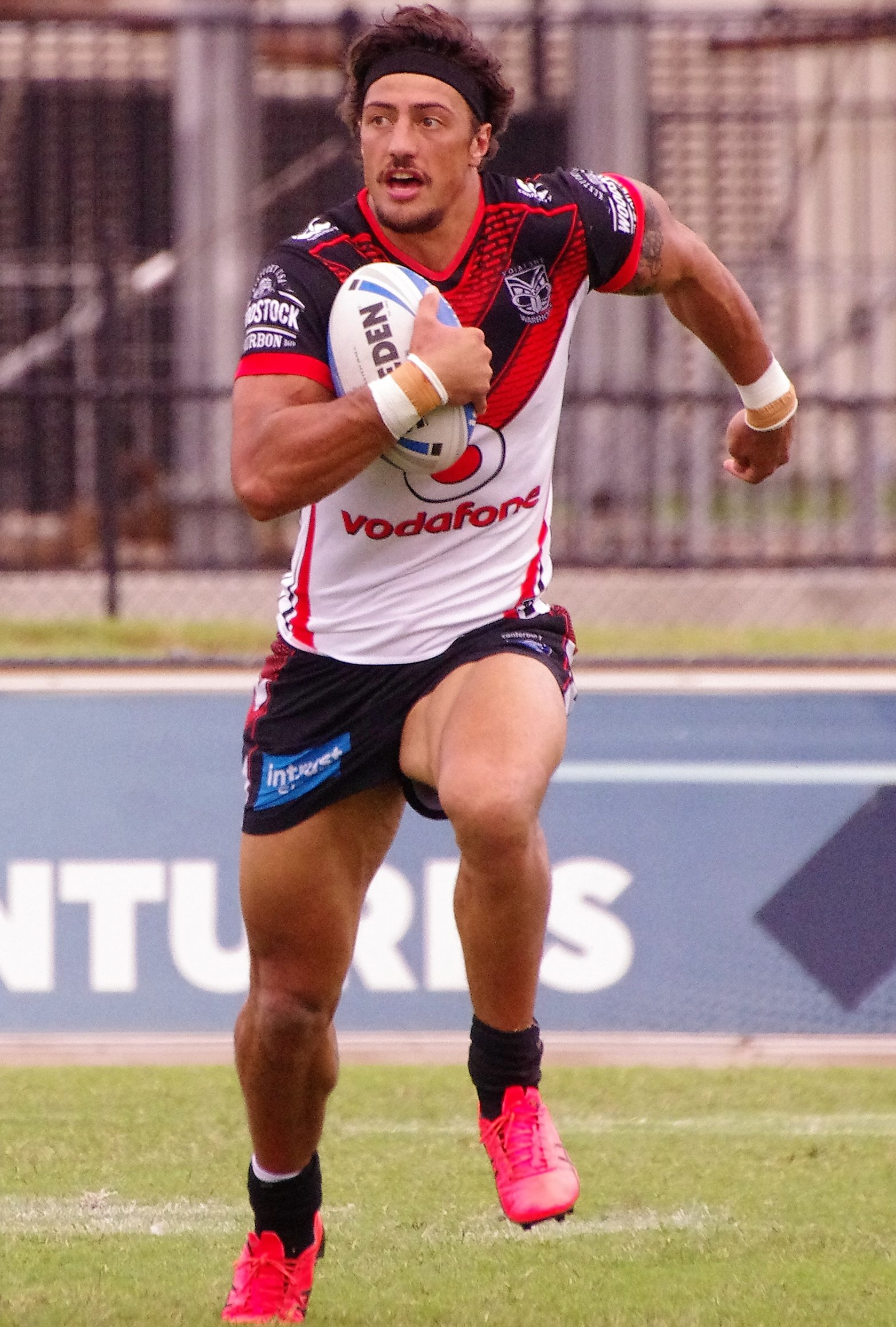

Personal information
- Born: 18 October 1990 (age 36) Auckland, New Zealand
- Height: 196 cm (6 ft 5 in)
- Weight: 102 kg (16 st 1 lb)

Playing information
- Position: Centre, Wing, Second-row
Club
Years	Team	Pld	T	G	FG	P
2012–17	Wigan Warriors	115	52	0	0	208
2018	New Zealand Warriors	7	2	0	0	8
2019	Widnes Vikings	18	11	0	0	44
2020	Warrington Wolves	13	7	0	0	28
2021	Leigh Centurions	6	2	0	0	8
	Total	159	74	0	0	296
Representative
Years	Team	Pld	T	G	FG	P
2009–22	Cook Islands	11	6	0	0	20
2019	Cook Islands 9s	3	2	0	0	8
- Source: As of 25 October 2022

Anthony Gelling (born 18 October 1990) is a Cook Islands international rugby league footballer who plays as a centre, winger and second-row forward.

He has previously played for the Wigan Warriors in the Super League, the New Zealand Warriors in the National Rugby League, the Widnes Vikings in the Championship, and the Warrington Wolves and the Leigh Centurions in the Super League.

== Background ==
Gelling was born in Auckland, New Zealand and is of Cook Island ancestry.

== Early career ==
Gelling was a Howick Hornets junior.

In 2009 and 2010 Gelling played for Sydney Roosters in the Toyota Cup. In September 2010 he was sacked by Roosters along with teammate Samuel Brunton.

In 2011 Gelling returned to New Zealand, joining Auckland Vulcans and his old club, Howick Hornets. Hornets won the 2011 Fox Memorial competition that year. He was named in the Counties Manukau Stingrays side in the 2011 National Competition.

== Club career ==
At the end of the 2011 season, Gelling signed a contract to play for Wigan Warriors in the Super League.

Gelling was allocated the number 24 jersey on arrival to Wigan Warriors' pre-2012 season training in Florida.

=== 2014 ===
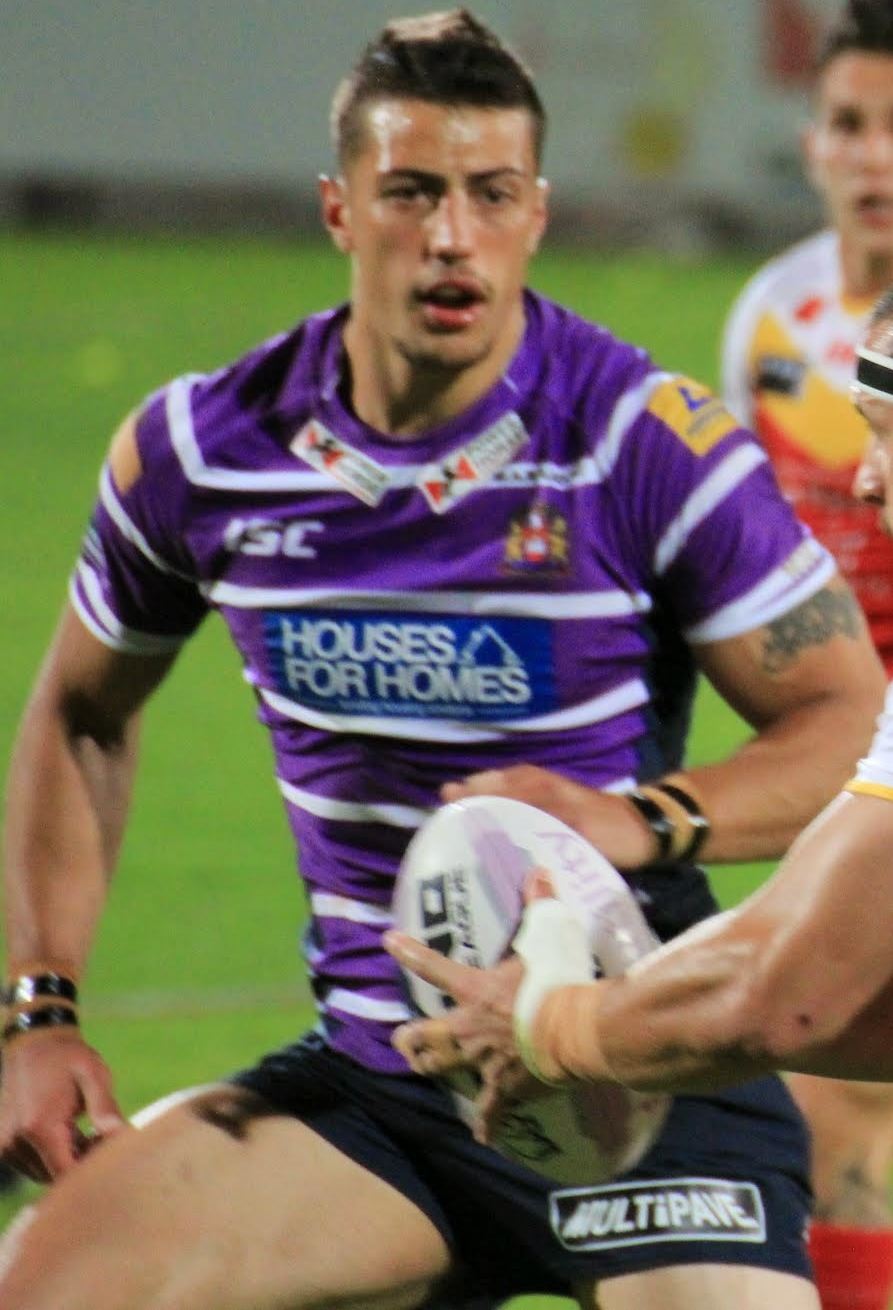
Gelling playing for the Wigan Warriors in 2014

He played in the 2014 Super League Grand Final defeat by St Helens at Old Trafford.

=== 2015 ===
Gelling proved himself to be somewhat of a cult hero at Wigan with his eccentric behaviour which included charging down a penalty goal attempt from Brisbane Broncos Corey Parker in golden point extra time of the World Club Series clash between the Broncos and Wigan on 21 February 2015 and riding to and from Wigan's Good Friday victory over local rivals St. Helens on 3 April 2015 on a BMX that he bought from Cash Converters for £100. On 16 June 2015 Gelling signed a new four-year contract with the Wigan club.

=== 2016 ===
In 2016 he refused to apologise for saying that some of the refereeing decisions "pissed me off" in a post match interview on Sky Sports, instead declaring "I speak my mind. I like to think of myself as a man of the people". A nickname which has since stuck. He played in the 2016 Super League Grand Final victory over the Warrington Wolves at Old Trafford.

=== 2017 ===
Gelling was part of the Wigan Warriors team that beat the Cronulla-Sutherland Sharks in the World Club Challenge. He scored his first tries of the season against the Leigh Centurions with a brace on 3 March. He scored against Warrington and the Huddersfield Giants in the next two fixtures. He didn't score again until the match against Huddersfield on 11 August before finishing the season with a try against rivals St. Helens and a brace against Hull FC.

He played in the 2017 Challenge Cup Final defeat by Hull F.C. at Wembley Stadium.

=== 2018 ===
He reported back to Wigan for preseason in preparation for the 2018 Super League season but not long after he asked for a release from his contract after his girlfriend was involved in a car crash. He returned home to New Zealand to be closer to his family and signed a one-year contract with the New Zealand Warriors.

=== 2020 ===
Gelling returned to play Super League, signing a two-year deal with Warrington after his contract in New Zealand expired. On 30 November 2020, it was announced that Gelling would be leaving Warrington at the end of the 2020 season, by mutual consent.

=== 2021 ===
On 13 April 2021, it was confirmed that Gelling had signed for Leigh, for the 2021 season. On 17 May 2021, he scored a try during his sides 16-30 loss at home to Wigan. He would then go on to play two more games, in which his final game would be against Hull KR on 30 May. On 18 May 2021, he was found not guilty of inflicting grievous bodily harm on his former partner, after a jury took just over four hours to deliberate, before acquitting him of the charge following a three-day trial at Liverpool Crown Court. On 7 June 2021, it was confirmed that Gelling had left the club, and returned home to New Zealand for personal reasons.

== International career ==
Gelling was part of the Cook Islands team that made the 2009 Pacific Cup Final. Gelling played for 'the Kukis' in their 28–24 test-match victory over Lebanon, scoring one try in the match. Gelling represented the Cooks in the 2013 Rugby League World Cup playing 2 out of the 3 matches the Cooks played at the Tournament.

On 17 October 2015, Gelling played for the Cook Islands in their Asia-Pacific Qualifier match against Tonga for the 2017 Rugby League World Cup.

At age 31, and with still plenty to give he played for the Cook Islands in the mid year pacific test against Samoa in which the Cook Islands lost 42-12 with Gelling trying hard to lift his team with spirited runs in the defeat. This resulted in coach Tony Iro selecting him to be part of the Cook Islands team for the Delayed 2021 Rugby League World Cup. Gelling represented the Cook Islands in two of their three group stage matches as they finished with one win at the tournament. Following their second group stage match against Papua New Guinea, Gelling announced his retirement from rugby league for a second time. This followed on from Gelling conducting a bizarre half-time interview with BBC side line reporter Jenna Brooks where instead of talking about the game Gelling spoke about tourism on the Cook Islands, he went on to say "It's raining, we're not really used to it. We're used to the sunshine a palm trees. If you're ever looking for a holiday, wedding, honeymoon, stag do, check out the Cook Islands, it's like a postcard. There's a law out there you can't have any buildings taller than the tallest coconut tree".
