= Rea Pittman =

Australian rugby league player (born 1993)

Personal information
- Born: 14 February 1993 (age 32); Paddington, New South Wales, Australia
- Height: 184 cm (6 ft 0 in)
- Weight: 90 kg (14 st 2 lb)

Playing information
- Position: Centre
Representative
Years	Team	Pld	T	G	FG	P
2013	Cook Islands	1	0	0	0	0

Rea Pittman is an Australian rugby league player who represented the Cook Islands national rugby league team in the 2013 World Cup.

== Playing career ==
Pittman works at Sydney Airport as a baggage handler. He is contracted to the Cronulla Sharks.

In 2013, Pittman was named in the Cook Islands squad for the World Cup.
