= Joe Matapuku =

Cook Islands international rugby league footballer

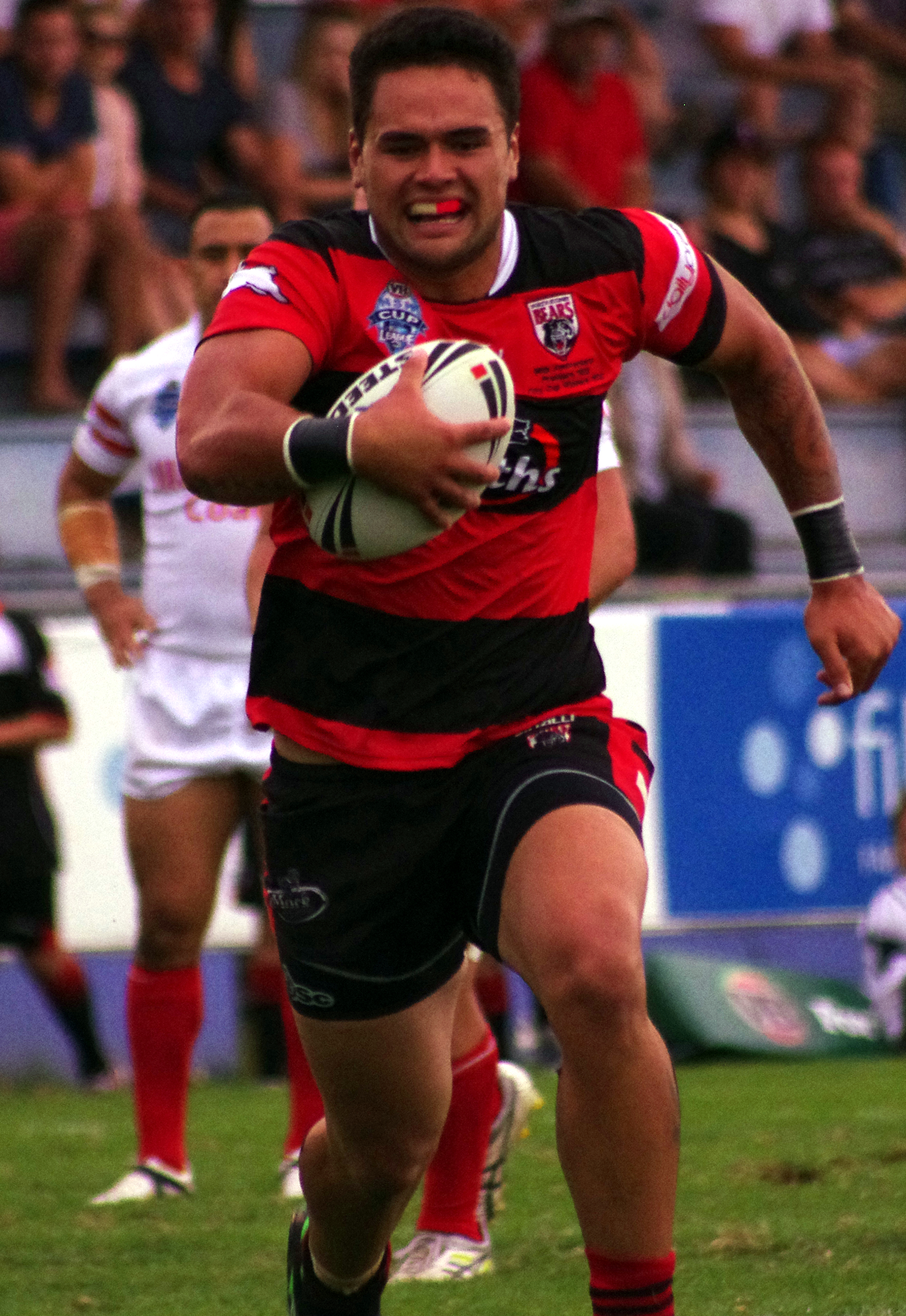

Personal information
- Born: 6 April 1989 (age 36); Auckland, New Zealand
- Height: 184 cm (6 ft 0 in)
- Weight: 98 kg (15 st 6 lb)

Playing information
- Position: Second-row, Prop
Representative
Years	Team	Pld	T	G	FG	P
2009–13	Cook Islands	5	0	0	0	0
- Source: As of 8 September 2013

Joe Matapuku (born 6 April 1989) is a New Zealand rugby league player for the Wentworthville Magpies in the NSW Cup. He plays as a prop. He is a Cook Islands international.
