= Sam Gardel =

Italy international rugby league player (born 1988)

Personal information
- Born: 19 January 1988 (age 38) Proserpine, Queensland, Australia

Playing information
- Position: Prop
Representative
Years	Team	Pld	T	G	FG	P
2013	Italy	1	0	0	0	0

Sam Gardel is an Australian Italian rugby league player who represented Italy in the 2013 World Cup.

== Playing career ==
Gardel played with the Whitsunday Brahmans from U6 to U16 before taking a break and returning to the club for four seasons of A-grade rugby.

He currently plays for the Souths Logan Magpies in the Queensland Cup as a prop.

Gardel was eligible to represent Italy because his grandparents were born there.
