= Lelauloto Tagaloa =

US international rugby league footballer

Loto Tagaloa
Personal information
- Full name: Lelauloto Tagaloa
- Born: 26 December 1986 (age 39) Samoa
- Height: 192 cm (6 ft 4 in)
- Weight: 104 kg (16 st 5 lb)

Playing information
- Position: Centre
Club
Years	Team	Pld	T	G	FG	P
2012–13	Hawaii Chiefs
2014–15	Sheffield Eagles	22	7	0	0	28
2015(loan)	→Doncaster	5	0	0	0	0
	Total	27	7	0	0	28
Representative
Years	Team	Pld	T	G	FG	P
2012–12	Hawaiian All Stars	1	1	0	0	4
2012–13	United States	5	0	0	0	0
- Source: As of 12 October 2015

Lelauloto 'Loto' Tagaloa is a Samoan rugby league footballer who represented the United States in the 2013 World Cup. He plays as a centre.

== Personal life ==
Tagaloa was born in Samoa. A member of the Church of Jesus Christ of Latter-day Saints (LDS Church), Tagaloa moved to Hawaii in 2010 to attend Brigham Young University. Whilst there, Tagaloa occasionally performed as a fire dancer at the Polynesian Culture Centre in Laie.

== Playing career ==
Tagaloa played for the Samoan residents in rugby league before moving to Hawaii. When in Hawaii he originally played rugby union before joining the Hawaii Chiefs rugby league team. His excellent form eventually saw him being selected for the United States Tomahawks.

In 2012, Tagaloa made his début for the United States Tomahawks, in their 28–20 defeat at home to Tonga. Later in the year, he was selected to play for the Hawaiian All Stars against a Queensland Indigenous All Stars. Despite the Hawaiian side losing heavily, Tagaloa scored a try.

In 2013, Tagaloa was named in the United States squad for the World Cup.

He played in the Tomahawks 22-18 friendly win over France, and played in both of USA's victories at the 2013 Rugby League World Cup, against Cook Islands and Wales, but did not play in their two defeats that eventually saw them exit the tournament.

His participation in the successful US 2013 World Cup team, saw him sign a deal with the Sheffield Eagles from 2014 onwards.
