= Adam Tangata =

Cook Islands international rugby league footballer

Adam "Adz" Tangata
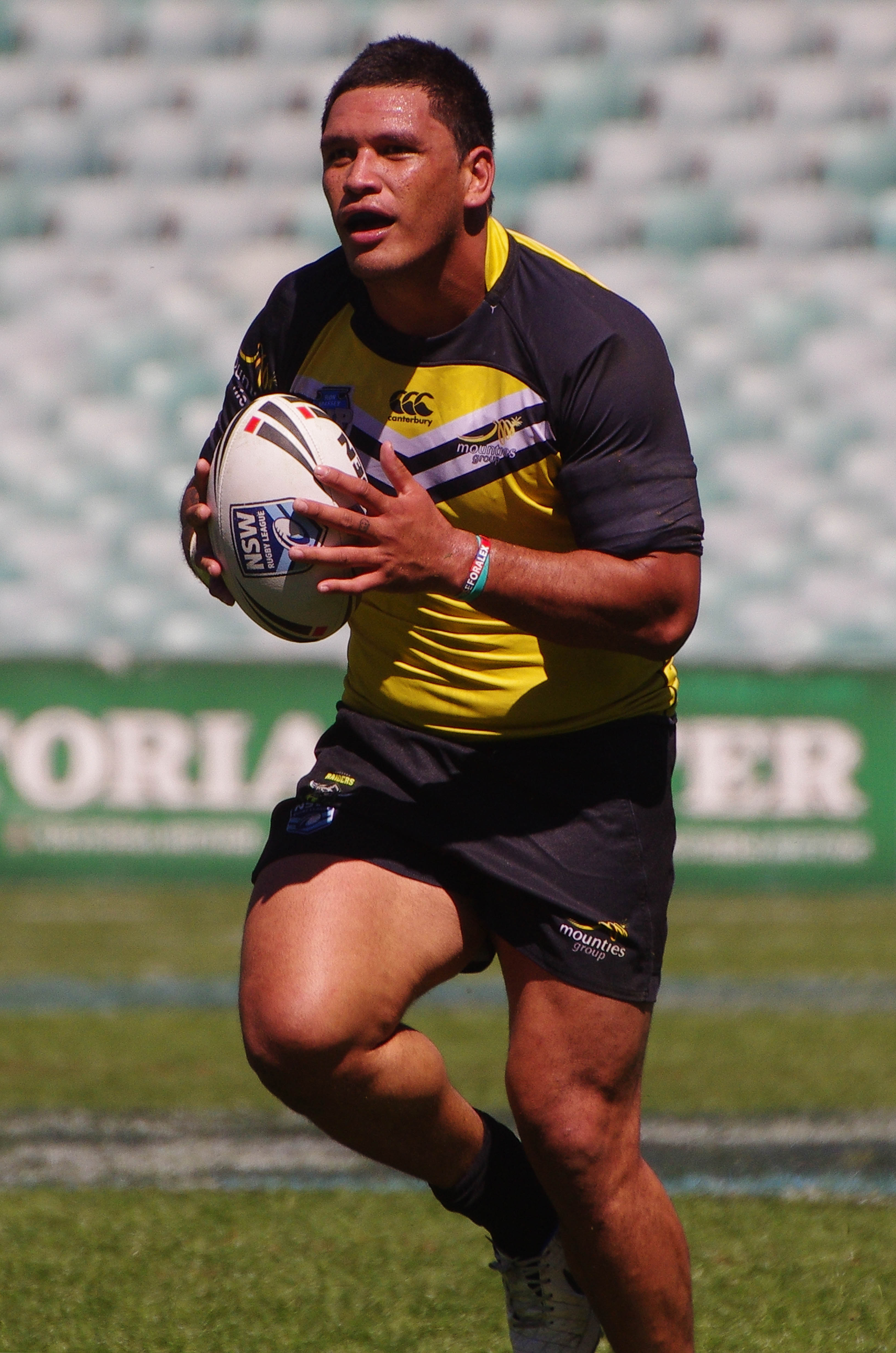

Personal information
- Full name: Adam Tangata
- Born: 17 March 1991 (age 35) Raratonga, Cook Islands
- Height: 6 ft 2 in (1.88 m)
- Weight: 16 st 12 lb (107 kg)

Playing information
- Position: Prop, Second-row
Club
Years	Team	Pld	T	G	FG	P
2015–18	Halifax	92	24	0	0	96
2019	Widnes Vikings	3	0	0	0	0
2019–20	Halifax	10	2	0	0	8
2019(loan)	→ Wakefield Trinity	5	0	0	0	0
2020(loan)	→ Wakefield Trinity	11	1	0	0	4
2021	Wakefield Trinity	1	0	0	0	0
2021–25	Halifax Panthers	132	18	0	0	72
2025–26	SO Avignon	14	2	0	0	8
2026–	Halifax Panthers	1	1	0	0	4
	Total	269	48	0	0	192
Representative
Years	Team	Pld	T	G	FG	P
2009–25	Cook Islands	5	1	0	0	4
- Source: As of 5 November 2026

Adam Tangata (born 17 March 1991) is a rugby league footballer who plays as a prop for Halifax Panthers in the Championship and formerly for the Cook Islands at international level.

He has previously played for Halifax in three separate spells as well as Wakefield Trinity and the Widnes Vikings. Tangata spent time during his second spell at 'Fax on loan at Wakefield in the Super League. He also appeared for Sporting Olympique Avignon in the Super XIII.

== Background ==
Tangata was born in Raratonga, Cook Islands. His surname Tangata translates to mean people from Polynesian languages.

== Career ==
Tangata played for the Mount Pritchard Mounties in the NSW Cup and he also played for the Canberra Raiders Under 20s side in 2011.

Tangata signed for English semi-professional club Halifax for the 2015 season, on a two-year contract.

Tangata is known for his aggressive tackling and hit-ups, and is a fans' favourite at Halifax. At Halifax, he has his own chant – "ooh aah Tangata", repurposed from Oops Up Side Your Head by The Gap Band.

=== Halifax ===
On 13 April 2021, it was reported that he had re-signed for Halifax in the RFL Championship on a deal that would keep him at the club until 2022. On 25 August, Tangata signed a contract extension with Halifax keeping him at the club until the end of 2024.

He called time on his Halifax Panthers career at the end of the 2025 season

=== Avignon ===
Tangata signed for Sporting Olympique Avignon of the Super XIII, the top tier of French Rugby League on the 18th November 2025.

=== Halifax (return) ===
Tangata returned to Halifax after the conclusion of the 2026 Super XIII season, beginning his fourth spell with the club. He made his first appearance since re-joining on 12th July 2026 versus Oldham, scoring a try in the process.

== International career ==
He represented his nation in the 2013 Rugby League World Cup.

Adam was named in the Cook Islands squad for the 2017 Rugby League World Cup qualifying match against Tonga.
