= Michael Garvey (rugby league) =

US international rugby league player

Personal information
- Born: July 27, 1988 (age 38) Voorhees Township, New Jersey, United States
- Height: 5 ft 10 in (178 cm)
- Weight: 198 lb (90 kg)

Playing information
- Position: Wing, Centre
Representative
Years	Team	Pld	T	G	FG	P
2011–14	United States	10	3	5	0	22

Michael Garvey (born July 27, 1988) is an American former rugby league player for the Philadelphia Fight in the USA Rugby League. He represented his country in the 2013 World Cup.

Raised in Haddonfield, New Jersey, Garvey played prep football at Haddonfield Memorial High School.

== Playing career ==
Garvey has played for the Ipswich Jets in the Queensland Cup, Aston Bulls in the AMNRL and previously played rugby union for Hawaii Pacific University where he was awarded the 2010 Hawaii Rugby Football Union MVP Award, and rugby league for the Aston Bulls where he was awarded the 2011 AMNRL Rookie of the Year Award as well as the 2012 U.S. International Player of the Year.

In 2013, Garvey was named in the United States squad for the World Cup and scored a try in their 22-18 trial win over France. His position is Center.
