= Joel Luani =

Tonga & US international rugby league footballer

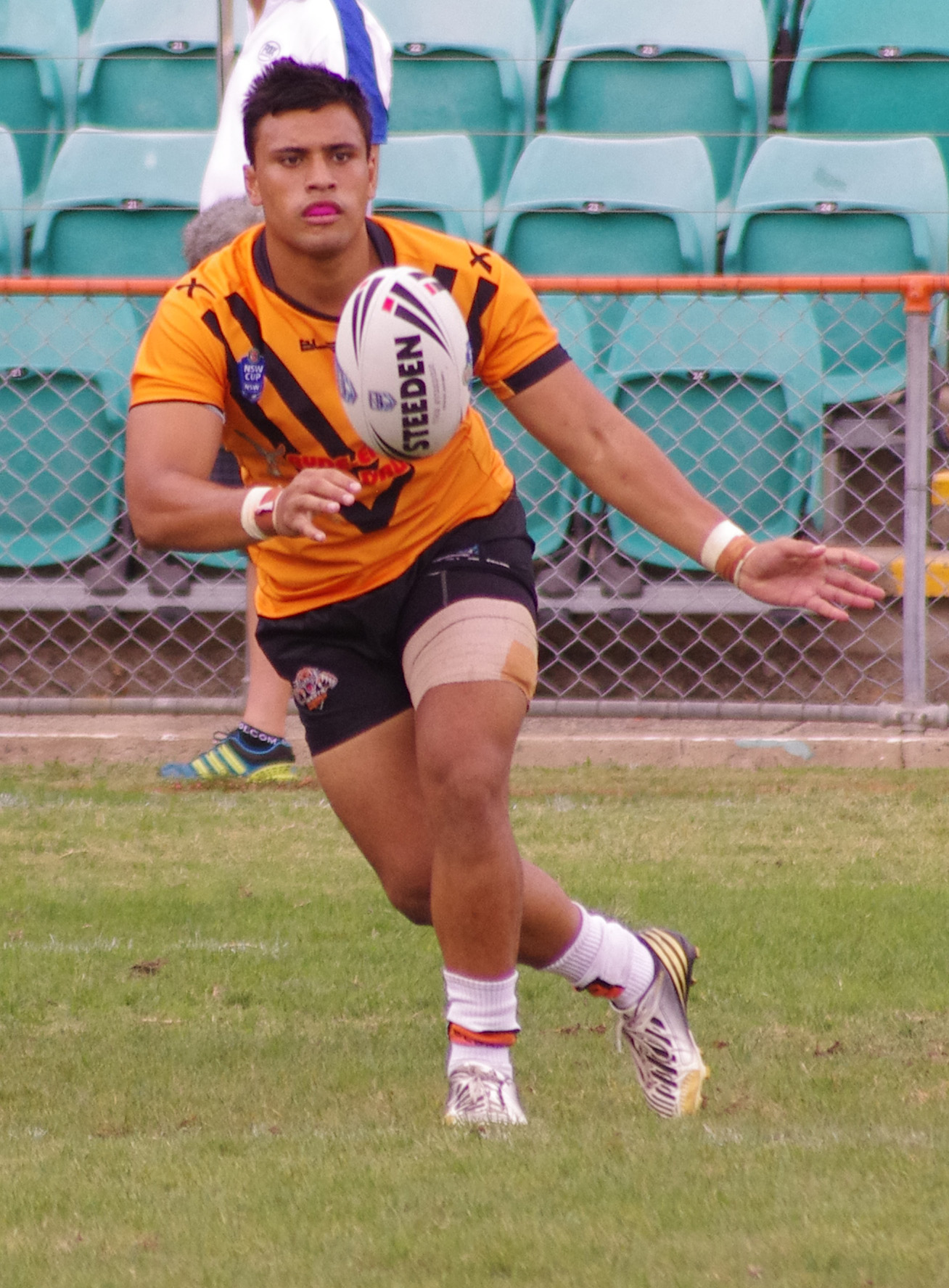
- Luani playing for the Tigers in 2013.

Personal information
- Full name: Haveatama Sioelipulu Halafungani
- Born: 16 February 1992 (age 34) Sydney, New South Wales, Australia
- Height: 180 cm (5 ft 11 in)
- Weight: 92 kg (14 st 7 lb)

Playing information
- Position: Hooker
Club
Years	Team	Pld	T	G	FG	P
2013–14	Wests Tigers	9	1	0	0	4
Representative
Years	Team	Pld	T	G	FG	P
2013	United States	4	0	0	0	0
2014–15	Tonga	3	0	0	0	0
- Source: As of 31 January 2019

Joel Luani (born 16 February 1992) is a former rugby league player who last played for the Canterbury-Bankstown Bulldogs in the Intrust Super Premiership. He played as a hooker and previously played for the Wests Tigers in the NRL.

== Background ==
Luani was born in Sydney, New South Wales, Australia. He is of American Samoan and Tongan descent.

He was educated at his father's alma mater Newington College (2008–2010) and played in the 1st XV rugby union team for three years. In his final year of school, he was a member of Newington's GPS Championship-winning team and went on to represent the Australian Schoolboys rugby union team. He played junior football for Five Dock before being signed by the Wests Tigers.

== Playing career ==
Luani played for the Tigers' NYC team in 2011 and 2012, playing second row in the 2012 premiership-winning team. Coach Todd Payten said, "Joel played in the back row, which was not his preferred position and not once did he complain. He just went out and did the job each week."

On 29 July 2013, Luani re-signed with the Tigers on a 2-year contract.

After being 18th man a number of times in the 2013 NRL season, Luani made his NRL debut for the Tigers against the Parramatta Eels in round 22. He played 3 games in a period when Robbie Farah was unavailable due to injury, scoring one try.

At the end of the season, Luani was chosen to be a member of the United States 2013 World Cup squad. He made his international debut playing at hooker in the side that defeated the Cook Islands 32–20, in the country's first ever World Cup match.

Luani made his debut for Tonga at the end of 2014. In 2015, he played halfback in a Polynesian Cup against Samoa, and was described as one of, "the halves changing perceptions of Pacific rugby league teams having an inability to produce quality playmakers."

He represented Tonga again at the conclusion of the 2015 season in the Asia-Pacific Qualifier match against the Cook Islands for the 2017 Rugby League World Cup, but he played this game in his usual position of hooker, with usual hooker Pat Politoni starting at five-eighth.

Luani didn't play in any first-grade games for the Tigers in 2015 and at the end of the season, was not re-signed by the club.
