= Lulia Lulia =

Cook Islands international rugby league footballer

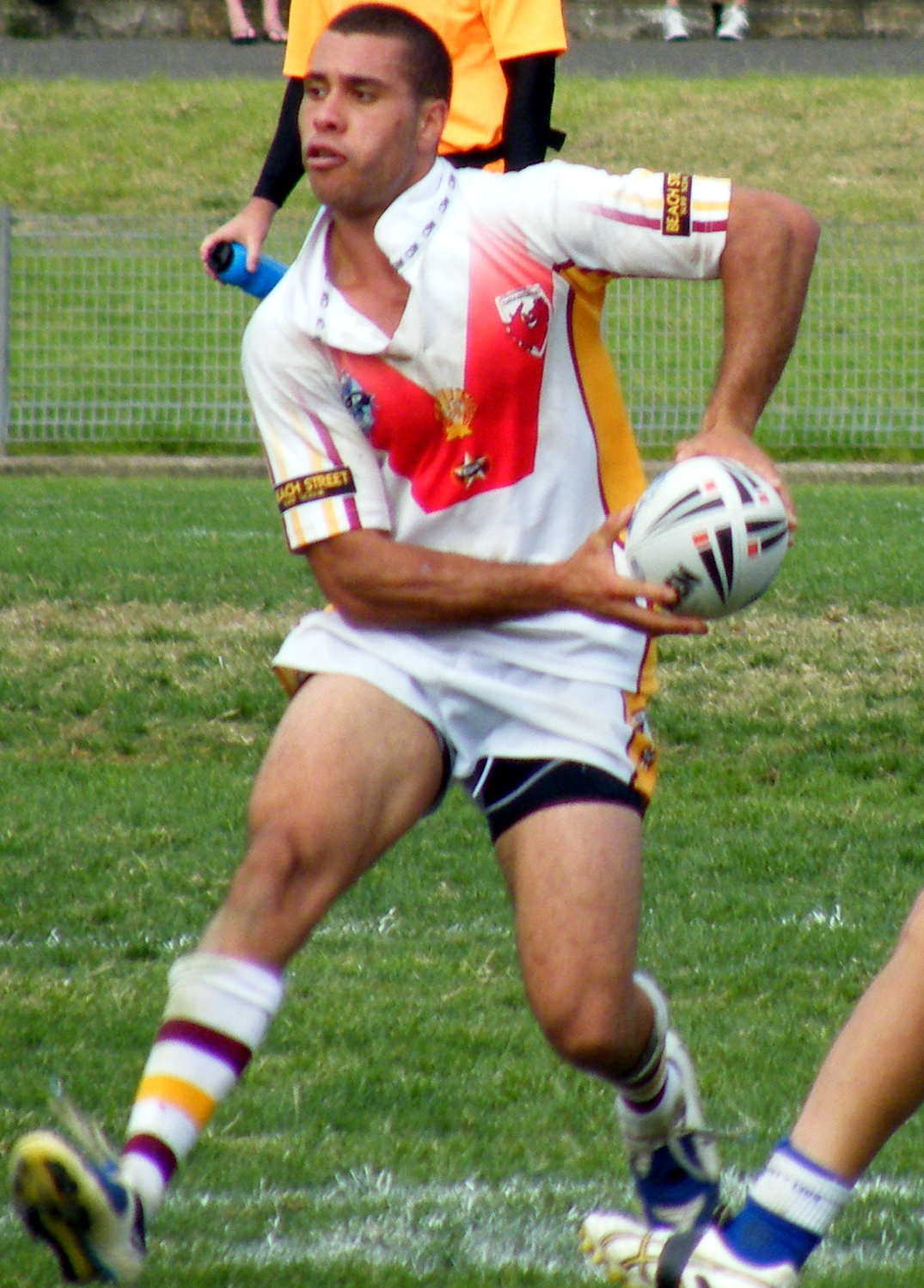

Personal information
- Born: 26 May 1985 (age 39); Sydney, New South Wales, Australia
- Height: 182 cm (6 ft 0 in)
- Weight: 97 kg (15 st 4 lb)

Playing information
- Position: Wing, Second-row, Fullback
Representative
Years	Team	Pld	T	G	FG	P
2009–13	Cook Islands	5	1	0	0	4
- Relatives: Keith Lulia (brother)

Lulia Lulia is a Cook Islands international rugby league footballer who played in the 2013 World Cup.

== Playing career ==
Lulia plays for the Shellharbour Sharks.

In 2013, Lulia was named in the Cook Islands squad for the World Cup.
