= Keith Lulia =

Cook Islands international rugby league footballer

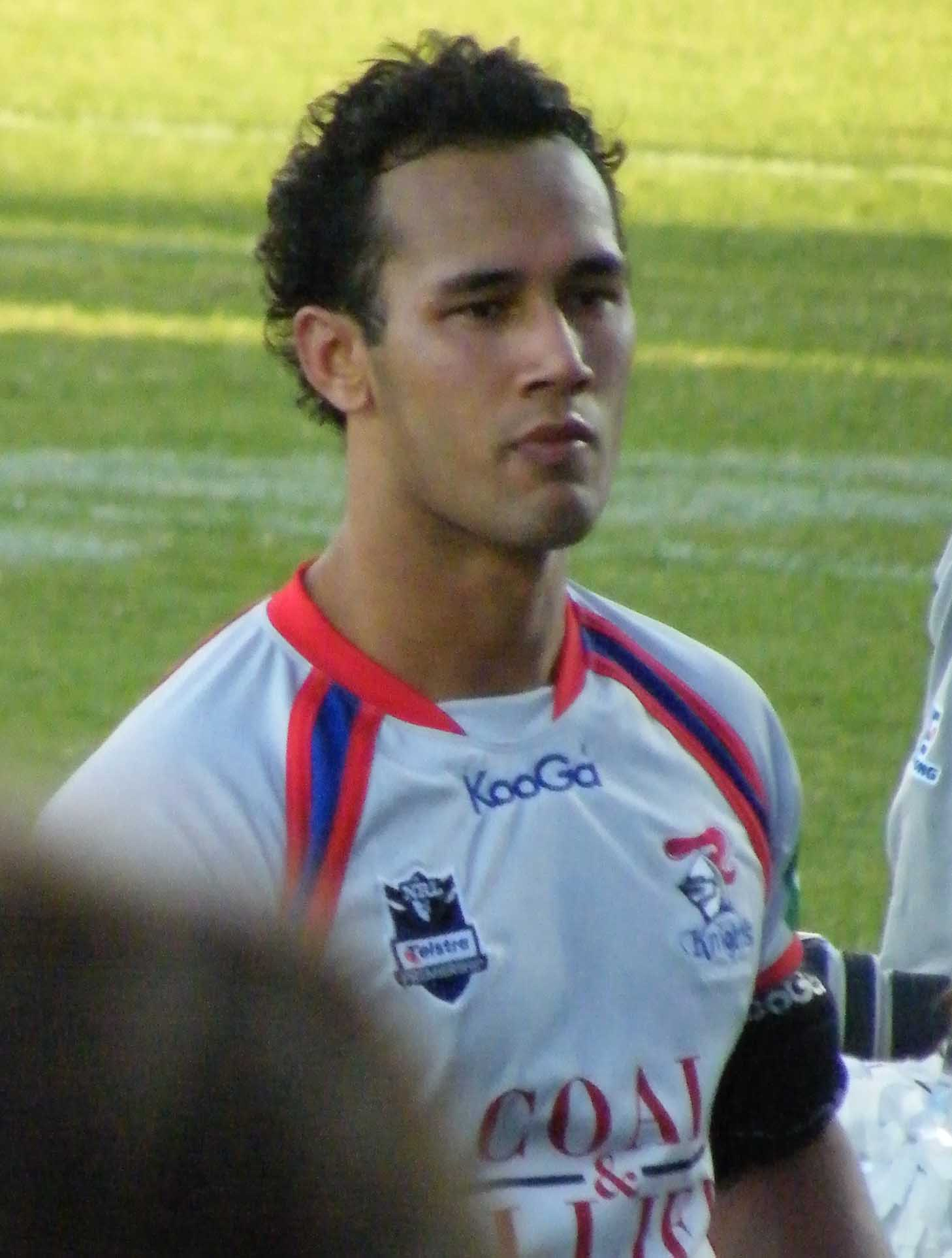

Personal information
- Full name: Keith Lulia
- Born: 17 June 1987 (age 39) Wollongong, New South Wales, Australia

Playing information
- Height: 192 cm (6 ft 4 in)
- Weight: 99 kg (15 st 8 lb)
- Position: Centre, Wing, Second-row
Club
Years	Team	Pld	T	G	FG	P
2007	St. George Illawarra	7	3	0	0	12
2008–11	Newcastle Knights	46	10	0	0	40
2012–13	Bradford Bulls	54	22	0	0	88
2014–15	Wests Tigers	12	5	0	0	20
	Total	119	40	0	0	160
Representative
Years	Team	Pld	T	G	FG	P
2009–13	Cook Islands	5	3	0	0	4
- Education: Illawarra Sports High School
- Relatives: Lulia Lulia (brother)

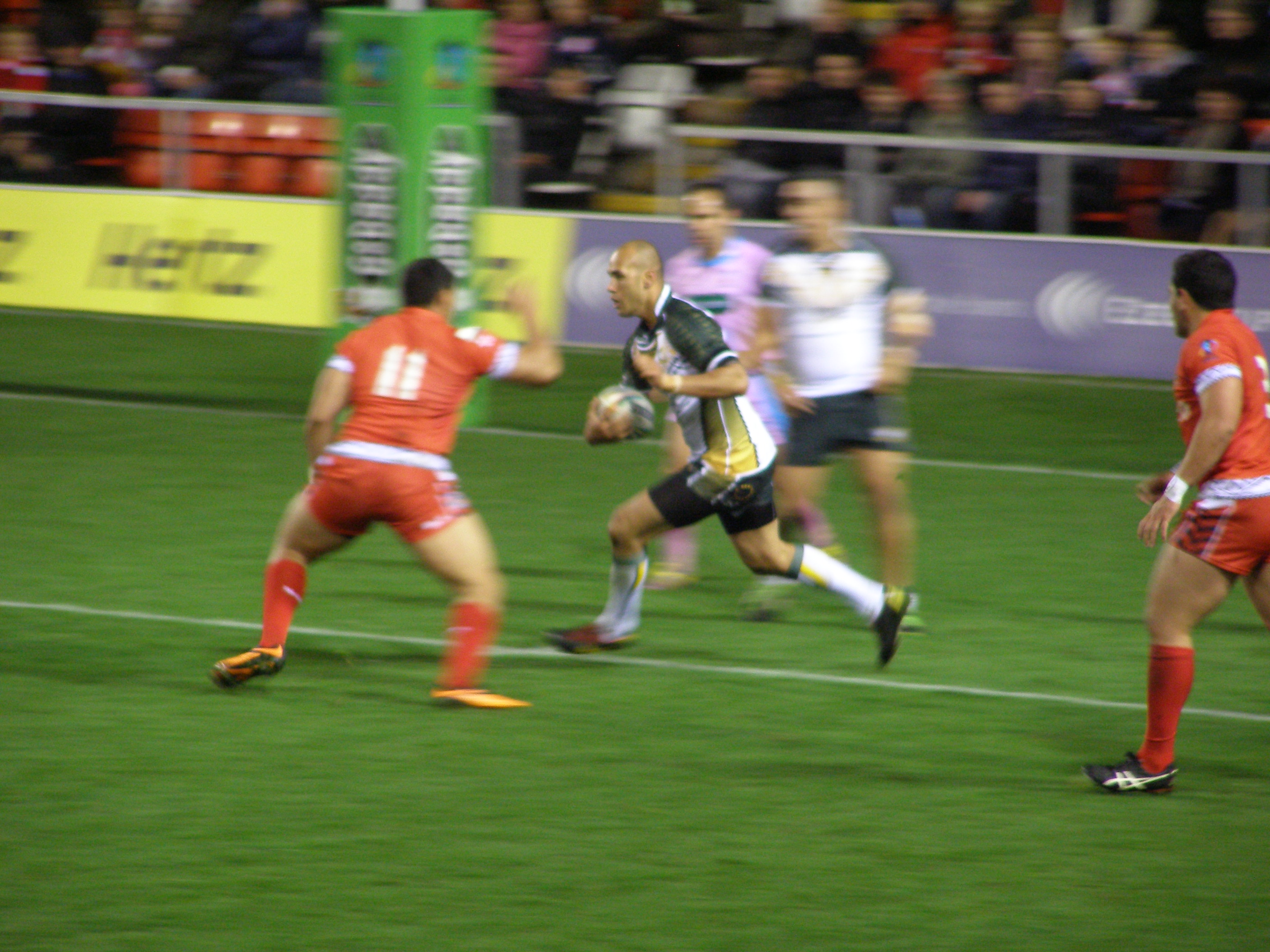
Lulia (in the center) playing for Cook Islands in 2013 Rugby League World Cup game against Tonga

Keith Lulia (born 17 June 1987) is a former Cook Islands international rugby league footballer who played in the 2000s and 2010s. He previously played for the Wests Tigers, the St. George Illawarra Dragons, the Newcastle Knights and the Bradford Bulls. He primarily played as a centre and as a wing, but could also fill in at second-row.

== Background ==
Born in Wollongong, New South Wales of Cook Islands heritage, Lulia Was educated at Illawarra Sports High School. He began his junior rugby league career at the Port Kembla Blacks.

== Playing career ==
=== St. George Illawarra Dragons ===
Lulia made his NRL début for the St. George Illawarra Dragons in Round 1 of the 2007 NRL season against the newly admitted Gold Coast side. He scored a try on debut in a 20-18 victory.

=== Newcastle Knights ===
Brian Smith signed Lulia to be a part of the Newcastle Knights side of 2008. He played in 46 matches for the Newcastle outfit spanning from 2008 to 2011.

=== Bradford Bulls (Super League) ===
In June 2011, the Bradford Bulls announced that Lulia had signed a two-year contract with the Super League club.

In 2012, Lulia missed the all four pre-season games due to a biceps tear. He also missed the first 2 rounds. However he featured in 25 consecutive games from Round 3 against Wigan to Round 27 against the Catalans Dragons. He also featured in the Challenge Cup against Doncaster and Warrington.

Lulia played in the pre-season friendlies against Dewsbury and Leeds. Lulia featured in seven consecutive games from Round 1 Wakefield Trinity Wildcats to Round 7 Hull Kingston Rovers. He was injured for Round 8. He featured in Round 9 Leeds to Round 20 Warrington. He missed Round 21 due to the birth of his child. Lulia returned in Round 22 against Hull F.C. to Round 27 Huddersfield. Lulia also featured in the Challenge Cup against Rochdale and the London Broncos.

=== Wests Tigers ===
On 18 July 2013, Lulia signed a two-year deal with the Wests Tigers, starting in 2014. He appeared sporadically in first grade in 2014, covering for injured players Chris Lawrence, Tim Simona and David Nofoaluma.

In Round 19 of the 2014 NRL season, Lulia scored four tries against the Canterbury-Bankstown Bulldogs, equaling the club record set by Kevin McGuinness and Marika Koroibete. His coach, Mick Potter, said, "that was a great performance from him. His finishing ability was just second to none. A couple of those tries he scored, not too many people can do that sort of stuff."

In August 2014, Lulia suffered a small vertebrae fracture to his neck and played no further football for the year. He made no first grade appearances in 2015 and was released at the end of the year.

== Representative career ==
Lulia represented the Cook Islands and was part of their squad for the 2009 Pacific Cup. He was also part of the team that took part in the 2013 Rugby League World Cup that was held in England and Wales
