= Chris Taripo =

Australian rugby league player (born 1992)

Personal information
- Born: 19 February 1992 (age 34) Sydney, Australia
- Height: 184 cm (6 ft 0 in)
- Weight: 92 kg (14 st 7 lb)

Playing information
- Position: Wing, Centre
Representative
Years	Team	Pld	T	G	FG	P
2012–2013	Cook Islands	3	3	8	0	28

Chris Taripo is an Australian rugby league player who represented Cook Islands in the 2013 World Cup.

== Playing career ==
Taripo played for the Sydney Roosters in the under-20's Holden Cup. In 2013 he played for the Newtown Jets in the NSW Cup and won their most improved player award.

In 2013, Taripo was named in the Cook Islands squad for the World Cup. He scored a hat-trick in the Cook Island's 16–22 loss to Tonga.
