= Les Soloai =

US international rugby league & union footballer

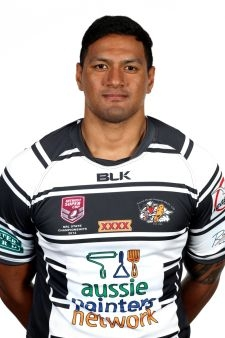
- Les Soloai with Tweed Heads Seagulls

Personal information
- Born: 20 February 1987 (age 39) New Zealand
- Height: 193 cm (6 ft 4 in)
- Weight: 115 kg (18 st 2 lb)

Playing information

Rugby league
- Position: Prop
Club
Years	Team	Pld	T	G	FG	P
2012	Featherstone Rovers
2014	Tweed Heads Seagulls
	Total	0	0	0	0	0
Representative
Years	Team	Pld	T	G	FG	P
2013	United States	6	0	0	0

Rugby union
Club
Years	Team	Pld	T	G	FG	P
2018–20	Utah Warriors
2020	Seattle Seawolves	0	0	0	0	0
	Total	0	0	0	0	0

Les Soloai is a New Zealand professional rugby league footballer who plays for the Seattle Seawolves of Major League Rugby (MLR).

Soloai also represented United States in the 2013 World Cup.

He previously played for the Utah Warriors in the MLR from 2018 to 2020.

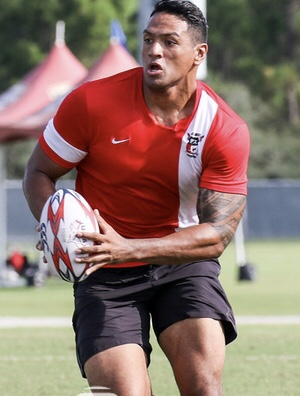
Soloai training with the Utah Warriors

== Playing career ==
Born in New Zealand. Soloai has previously played for the Tweed Heads Seagulls in the Intrust Super Cup. Featherstone Rover in the UK Championship and Hawaii Chiefs in the AMNRL.

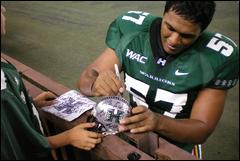
Soloai with the University of Hawaii Rainbow Warriors

He has also played American football for the University of Hawaii and Basketball at BYUH.

His position is at prop. He is a USA international He has previously held a scholarship with the Wests Tigers

In 2013, Soloai was named in the United States squad for the World Cup and played in their 22–18 win over France, win over Cook Islands, Wales and quarter final loss to Australia.
