= Matt Shipway =

RL coach and former United States international rugby league footballer

Personal information
- Full name: Matthew Shipway
- Born: 11 September 1985 (age 41) Newcastle, New South Wales, Australia
- Height: 175 cm (5 ft 9 in)
- Weight: 97 kg (15 st 4 lb)

Playing information
- Position: Second-row
Club
| Years | Team | Pld | T | G | FG | P |
|---|---|---|---|---|---|---|
| 2008–10 | Macquarie Scorpions |
| 2010–14 | South Newcastle Lions |
| 2014 | Boston Thirteens |
| | Total | 0 | 0 | 0 | 0 | 0 |
Representative
| Years | Team | Pld | T | G | FG | P |
| 2013–17 | United States | 6 | 1 | 0 | 0 | 4 |
| 2013 | Newcastle Rebels |

Coaching information
Club
| Years | Team | Gms | W | D | L | W% |
| 2015 | Port Macquarie Sharks |
- Source: As of 29 January 2021

Matt Shipway (born 11 September 1985) is a United States international rugby league footballer and coach of the Port Macquarie Sharks. He primarily plays as a second-row.

== Background ==
Shipway was born in Newcastle, New South Wales. He is of American descent through his grandparents.

== Playing career ==
In 2006, Shipway captained the Port Macquarie Sharks to a premiership, before moving back to Newcastle two years later.

After moving to Newcastle, Shipway signed to play for The Entrance Tigers, only for the team to fold before he could play a game.

In 2008, Shipway joined the Macquarie Scorpions in the Newcastle Rugby League.

In 2010, Shipway signed with the South Newcastle Lions, taking on the captain-coach role in 2011.

In 2012, Shipway was on standby for various games for the Newcastle Knights' New South Wales Cup team, as a possible fill-in for injuries.

In 2013, Shipway gave up the coaching side of his captain-coach role to concentrate more on his game.

In June 2013, Shipway played for the Newcastle Rebels representative team.

In October 2013, Shipway was named in the New South Wales Country Residents team to tour South Africa. Before the tournament, he credited his selection in the team to his decision to give up the coaching role at South Newcastle that year to concentrate on his game saying, "I think I still played pretty good footy as the captain-coach, but the move allowed me to concentrate more on my game and the biggest thing was not having to worry about anyone else. As the captain-coach I'd have to turn up and watch the first two games and talk to the other coaches then go in the sheds and try and get everyone else ready for the game as well." He eventually had to leave the team mid-tour on 10 October 2013, as he was named in the United States 2013 Rugby League World Cup squad.

Shipway played in the United States 22-18 warm up game win over France where he scored a try, before playing 4 games in the World Cup tournament. His tour helped him develop a cult following back in Port Macquarie, where his friend Joe Cudmore started the Facebook page "The red-headed Sonny Bill Williams".

In 2014, Shipway joined the Boston Thirteens in the USA Rugby League.

In 2015, Shipway became the coach of the Port Macquarie Sharks.

In 2018, Shipway coached and played in Port Macquarie's first premiership win in 20 years.
