= Samuel Brunton =

New Zealand rugby league footballer (born 1990)

Sam Brunton
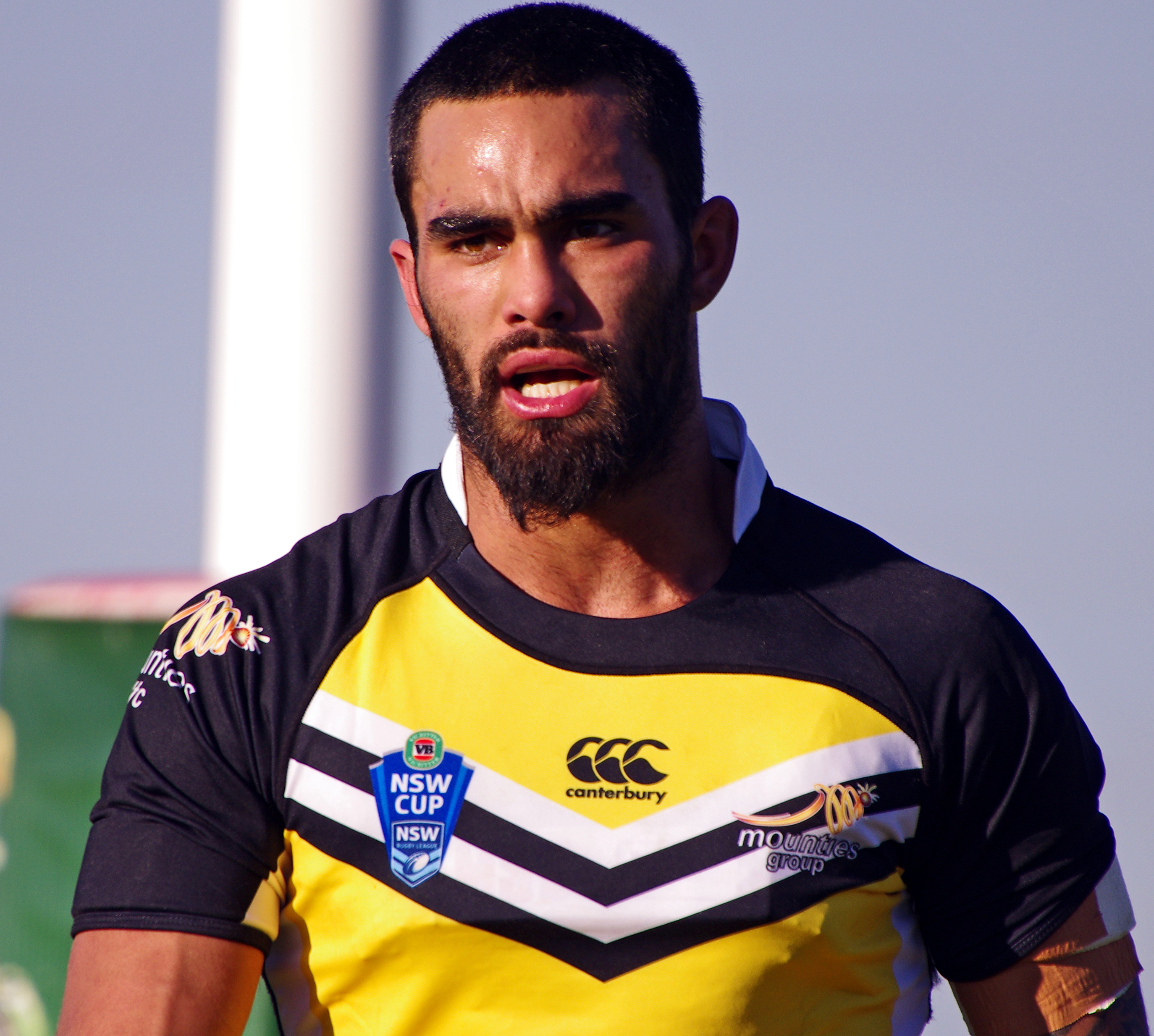

Personal information
- Full name: Samuel Brunton
- Born: 20 February 1990 (age 35); Auckland, New Zealand

Playing information
- Position: Hooker, Lock
Club
Years	Team	Pld	T	G	FG	P
2010	Sydney Roosters	3	0	0	0	0
Representative
Years	Team	Pld	T	G	FG	P
2009–13	Cook Islands	4	0	0	0	0
- Source: As of 23 November 2023

Samuel Brunton (born 20 February 1990) is a New Zealand former professional rugby league player. He played as a lock or hooker. He is a Cook Islands international.

== Early years ==
Brunton was a Howick Hornets and Mangere East Hawks junior.

== Playing career ==
Brunton was a member of the Sydney Roosters premiership-winning SG Ball team of 2008. In 2009 and 2010, he played for the Sydney Roosters Under 20s team. Brunton made his National Rugby League debut on 17 April 2010 against the Canberra Raiders. He appeared four times for the Sydney Roosters in the 2010 NRL season, until he was sacked from the club after he defecated in a hotel room in Townsville, Queensland, in early September. Brunton would later play for Mounties in the NSW Cup.

== International career ==
Brunton made his Cook Islands debut against Fiji in the 2009 Pacific Cup.

Brunton played for 'the Kukis' in the 2013 Rugby League World Cup
