= Alex Szostak =

Scotland international rugby league footballer

Personal information
- Born: 4 April 1986 (age 39) Keighley, West Yorkshire, England

Playing information
- Position: Second-row
Club
Years	Team	Pld	T	G	FG	P
2008–13	Sheffield Eagles	148	28	0	0	112
2014–17	Workington Town	34	1	0	0	4
	Total	182	29	0	0	116
Representative
Years	Team	Pld	T	G	FG	P
2004–13	Scotland	17	1	0	0	4

Alex Szostak (born 4 April 1986) is a former Scotland international rugby league footballer who played as a second-row forward for the Sheffield Eagles in the RFL Championship and Workington Town in Kingstone Press League 1.

== Background ==
Szostak was born in Keighley, West Yorkshire, England.

== Career ==
Szostak started his career with Bradford Bulls, and played for several seasons in the club's under-21 team.

He played at club level for Workington Town, as a second-row.

Alex won two Championship titles with Sheffield in 2012 and 2013, before leaving the club to concentrate on his work commitments. Szostak signed with Workington Town for the 2014 season but sustained a knee injury during a match against Whitehaven, which kept him out of the remaining games of the 2014 and start of the 2015 season.

In June 2015 Szostak signed again with Workington Town for the remaining games of the 2015 season. Szostak made his 2nd début for Workington Town against London Broncos on Sunday, 19 July, at Derwent Park.
