= Craig Priestly =

US international rugby league footballer

Personal information
- Born: 8 January 1987 (age 39) Sydney, New South Wales, Australia
- Height: 175 cm (5 ft 9 in)
- Weight: 80 kg (12 st 8 lb)

Playing information
- Position: Halfback, Hooker
Club
Years	Team	Pld	T	G	FG	P
2013–13	Southampton Dragons
Representative
Years	Team	Pld	T	G	FG	P
2013	United States	10	3	15		42

Coaching information
Club
Years	Team	Gms	W	D	L	W%
2013	Southampton Dragons	0	0	0	0

Craig Priestly is an Australian rugby league footballer who represented United States in the 2013 Rugby League World Cup.

== Background ==
Priestly was born in Sydney, New South Wales, Australia and is currently a Real Estate Agent in Maine, USA.

== Playing career ==
Priestly played 46 games for the Redcliffe Dolphins in the Queensland Cup. He currently plays for the Southampton Dragons in the AMNRL.

In 2013, Priestly was named in the United States squad for the World Cup.
