= Taylor Welch =

United States international rugby player

Taylor Arden Welch
Personal information
- Full name: Taylor Arden Welch
- Born: November 1, 1989 (age 35); Dallas, Texas, United States
- Height: 6 ft 0 in (183 cm)
- Weight: 216 lb (98 kg)

Playing information

Rugby league
- Position: Fullback, Wing, Centre
Club
Years	Team	Pld	T	G	FG	P
2008	Warrington Wolves	1	0	0	0	0
	New York Raiders	0	0	0	0	0
2014	Townsville Blackhawks	0	0	0	0	0
2018–	Rochdale Hornets	2	0	0	0	0
	Total	3	0	0	0	0
Representative
Years	Team	Pld	T	G	FG	P
2013	United States	3	1	0	0	4

Rugby union
Club
Years	Team	Pld	T	G	FG	P
	Fylde RFC	0	0	0	0	0
	Pays d'Aix RC	0	0	0	0	0
	Chicago Griffins RFC	0	0	0	0	0
	Total	0	0	0	0	0
- Source: As of July 28, 2021

Taylor Welch (born November 1, 1989) is an American rugby player who played one professional rugby league match for the Warrington Wolves in the Super League in 2008. Welch was selected to represent the United States national team at the 2013 Rugby League World Cup.

== Background ==
Welch was born in Dallas, Texas, United States. He and his father relocated to Warrington, Cheshire, England in 2003, following the death of his mother. He attended Crosfields School and Lymm High School.

== Playing career ==
Having played American football in his youth, he transitioned to rugby union in school and was convinced to try rugby league by the Warrington Wolves head coach Paul Cullen, joining the team's youth academy. Playing as a wing, his under 18s début initially was held back due to his classification as an overseas player, an issue finally resolved with special dispensation from the Rugby Football League.

In 2008, Welch was drafted onto Warrington's 19-man roster to cover for an injured Chris Riley. Riley was cleared to play, however Welch had trained so well that he was selected to the 13-man playing roster ahead of teammate Kevin Penny for the game against the Castleford Tigers. He is thought to have become the first American to play for Warrington Wolves and the first ever to play in the Super League.

Welch has continued to play rugby union. He was selected in the United States training squad for the Rugby Union NAWIRA Sevens Qualifiers in the Bahamas. He has played for Fylde Rugby Club, Pays d'Aix RC in Pro D2 and Sale F.C., and applied for U.K. citizenship to enable him to count as a player in Super League. Welch subsequently relocated back to the United States. He has continued playing rugby with the New York Raiders of the American National Rugby League and the Chicago Griffins rugby union team, and has trained with the startup Chicago Stockyarders.

In October 2014, Welch signed with the semi-professional Townsville Blackhawks for their inaugural season in Australia's Queensland Cup.
