= Tui Samoa =

United States international rugby league player

Personal information
- Full name: Tuisegasega Samoa
- Born: April 29, 1983 (age 41); Brooklyn, New York
- Height: 5 ft 9 in (175 cm)
- Weight: 190 lb (86 kg)

Playing information
- Position: Hooker, Lock, Halfback
Club
Years	Team	Pld	T	G	FG	P
	Redcliffe Dolphins	0	0	0	0	0
Representative
Years	Team	Pld	T	G	FG	P
2004	American Samoa	1	1	0	0	4
2013	United States	4	2	0	0	8
- Source: As of August 29, 2021

Tui Samoa is an American rugby league player who plays for the Junee Diesels in the Group 9 Rugby League competition. He primarily plays as a hooker, but can play as a lock and halfback. He is a United States International.

== Playing career ==
He played for American Samoa in the 2004 Pacific Cup on October 20, 2004 in Auckland.

Samoa has played for the United States in both the 2013 and 2017 Rugby League World Cup.

He has previously played for the Redcliffe Dolphins in the Intrust Super Cup.
