= List of North Wales Crusaders players =

This page details the players to have played for the North Wales Crusaders club.

== All players ==
List of players with appearance number. If two players made their début during the same game shirt numbers will decide which player comes first.

North Wales Crusaders Players
	Name	First Game	Last Game	Played	Tries	Goals	Drop Goals	Points
1	(England) Danny Hulme	Barrow Raiders 11/3/2012	South Wales Scorpions 5/8/2012	9	9	0	0	36
2	(England) Adam Walsh	Barrow Raiders 11/3/2012	Wigan Warriors 15/4/2012	3	0	0	0	0
3	(Wales) Christiaan Roets	Barrow Raiders 11/3/2012	Last Game	61	6	0	0	24
4	(Wales) Rob Massam	Barrow Raiders 11/3/2012	Last Game	82	66	0	0	264
5	(England) Chris Walker	Barrow Raiders 11/3/2012	Barrow Raiders 11/3/2012	1	0	0	0	0
6	(England) Andy Moulsdale	Barrow Raiders 11/3/2012	Last Game	20	10	0	0	40
7	(England) Jamie Durbin	Barrow Raiders 11/3/2012	Last Game	13	3	0	0	12
8	(England) Chris Tyrer	Barrow Raiders 11/3/2012	Whitehaven RLFC 13/5/2012	9	0	0	0	0
9	(England) Lee Hudson	Barrow Raiders 11/3/2012	Last Game	18	1	0	0	4
10	(England) Jonny Walker	Barrow Raiders 11/3/2012		20	2	0	0	8
11	(England) Leon Brennan	Barrow Raiders 11/3/2012		17	10	3	0	46
12	(England) Mark Hamon	Barrow Raiders 11/3/2012	Wigan Warriors 15/4/2012	2	0	0	0	0
13	(England) Jono Smith	Barrow Raiders 11/3/2012		16	6	3	0	30
14	(Wales) Owain Brown	Barrow Raiders 11/3/2012		14	1	0	0	4
15	(Wales) Iwan Brown	Barrow Raiders 11/3/2012	Barrow Raiders 24/6/2012	12	1	0	0	4
16	(England) Tommy Johnson	Barrow Raiders 11/3/2012		20	3	41	0	94
17	(England) Billy Sheen	Barrow Raiders 11/3/2012		14	8	0	0	32
18	(Wales) Kriss Wilkes	London Skolars 18/3/2012	Rochdale Hornets 03/7/2012	9	3	0	0	12
19	(England) Anthony Morrison	London Skolars 18/3/2012	Whitehaven RLFC 2/9/2012	15	2	0	0	8
20	(Republic of Ireland) Aaron McCloskey	London Skolars 18/3/2012	London Skolars 18/3/2012	1	0	0	0	0
21	(Republic of Ireland) Ian Cross	London Skolars 18/3/2012	Doncaster RLFC 27/5/2012	7	1	5	0	14
22	(England) Craig Lawton	Toulouse Olympique XIII 24/3/2012	Toulouse Olympique XIII 24/3/2012	1	0	0	0	0
23	(England) Kurt Haggerty	Rochdale Hornets 1/4/2012	Rochdale Hornets 1/4/2012	1	0	0	0	0
24	(England) Chris Lunt	Rochdale Hornets 1/4/2012	Whitehaven RLFC 13/5/2012	2	0	0	0	0
25	(England) Gareth Frodsham	Rochdale Hornets 1/4/2012	Oldham Roughyeds 6/5/2012	2	0	0	0	0
26	(England) Jamie Clark	South Wales Scorpions 9/4/2012		11	2	0	0	8
27	(England) Sam Broadbent	Wigan Warriors 15/4/2012	Oldham Roughyeds 10/6/2012	5	1	6	0	16
28	(Wales) Owain Griffiths	Wigan Warriors 15/4/2012		8	0	0	0	0
29	(England) Adam Clay	Workington Town 22/4/2012		10	6	0	0	24
30	(England) Simon Stephens	Workington Town 22/4/2012		14	1	0	0	4
31	(England) Andy Gorski	Doncaster RLFC 27/5/2012		10	5	0	0	20
32	(England) Alex Trumper	Doncaster RLFC 27/5/2012	Barrow Raiders 24/6/2012	3	0	0	0	0
33	(England) Toby Adamson	Oldham Roughyeds 10/6/2012		8	1	0	0	4
34	(Scotland) Dave McConnell	Workington Town 1/7/2012		5	2	0	0	8
35	(England) Liam Hulme	Gateshead Thunder 8/7/2012	Doncaster 19/8/2012	6	3	0	0	12
36	(England) Dave Orwell	Gateshead Thunder 15/7/2012	Rochdale Hornets 03/7/2012	2	0	0	0	0
37	(Wales) Lewys Weaver	London Skolars 12/8/2012		2	1	0	0	4
38	(England) Gary Middlehurst	début	Last Game	1	0	0	0	0
39	(England) Stuart Reardon	début	Last Game	1	0	0	0	0
40	(England) Phil Braddish	début	Last Game	1	0	0	0	0
41	(Scotland) Ryan MacDonald	début	Last Game	1	0	0	0	0
42	(England) Steve McDermott	début	Last Game	1	0	0	0	0
43	(England) Matt Reid	début	Last Game	1	0	0	0	0
44	(England) Steve Bannister	début	Last Game	1	0	0	0	0
45	(England) Craig White	début	Last Game	1	0	0	0	0
46	(England) Adam Bowman	début	Last Game	1	0	0	0	0
47	(Wales) Andrew Oakden	début	Last Game	1	0	0	0	0
48	(England) Troy Brophy	début	Last Game	1	0	0	0	0
49	(England) Dan Birkett	début	Last Game	1	0	0	0	0
50	(England) Jamie Dallimore	début	Last Game	1	0	0	0	0
51	(England) Adam Scott	début	Last Game	1	0	0	0	0
52	(Republic of Ireland) Michael Platt	début	Last Game	1	0	0	0	0
53	(England) Craig Ashall	début	Last Game	1	0	0	0	0
54	(United States) Mark Offerdahl	début	Last Game	1	0	0	0	0
55	(England) Stephen Wild	début	Last Game	1	0	0	0	0
56	(Wales) David Mills	début	Last Game	1	0	0	0	0
57	(England) Karl Ashall	début	Last Game	1	0	0	0	0
58	(England) Dec Hulme	début	Last Game	1	0	0	0	0
59	(England) Tom Gilmore	début	Last Game	1	0	0	0	0
60	(England) Greg Wilde	début	Last Game	1	0	0	0	0
61	(England) Adam Lawton	début	Last Game	1	0	0	0	0
62	(France) Sébastien Martins	début	Last Game	1	0	0	0	0
63	(France) Jonathan Soum	début	Last Game	1	0	0	0	0
64	(England) Grant Gore	début	Last Game	1	0	0	0	0
65	(England) Mick Govin	début	Last Game	1	0	0	0	0
66	(England) Ryan Duffy	début	Last Game	1	0	0	0	0
67	(England) Alex Davidson	début	Last Game	3	0	0	0	0
68	(England) Andy Thornley	début	Last Game	1	0	0	0	0
69	(England) Scott Turner	début	Last Game	1	0	0	0	0
70	(England) Dom Speakman	début	Last Game	4	1	0	0	4
71	(England) Harry Files	début	Last Game	1	0	0	0	0
72	(England) Matt Gee	début	Last Game	1	0	0	0	0
73	(England) Callum Wright	début	Last Game	1	0	0	0	0
74	(Wales) Joe Burke	début	Last Game	1	0	0	0	0
75	(England) Alex Thompson	début	Last Game	1	0	0	0	0
76	(England) Mark Hobson	début	Last Game	1	0	0	0	0
77	(England) George King	début	Last Game	1	0	0	0	0
78	(England) Elliott Davies	début	Last Game	1	0	0	0	0
79	(England) Ian Mort	début	Last Game	1	0	0	0	0
80	(England) Gene Ormsby	début	Last Game	1	0	0	0	0
81	(Republic of Ireland) Paddy Mooney	début	Last Game	1	0	0	0	0
82	(England) Dec Patton	début	Last Game	1	0	0	0	0
83	(England) Joe Philbin	début	Last Game	1	0	0	0	0
84	(England) Andy Joy	début	Last Game	1	0	0	0	0
85	(England) Kevin Penny	début	Last Game	1	0	0	0	0
86	(England) Gary Wheeler	début	Last Game	1	0	0	0	0
87	(England) Gareth O'Brien	début	Last Game	1	0	0	0	0
88	(England) Sam Peet	début	Last Game	1	0	0	0	0
89	(France) Benjamin Jullien	début	Last Game	14	7	0	0	0
90	(Wales) Rhys Evans	début	Last Game	1	0	0	0	0
91	(Wales) ****	début	Last Game	1	0	0	0	0
92	(Wales) ****	début	Last Game	1	0	0	0	0
93	(Wales) ****	début	Last Game	1	0	0	0	0
94	(Wales) ****	début	Last Game	1	0	0	0	0
95	(Wales) ****	début	Last Game	1	0	0	0	0
96	(Wales) ****	début	Last Game	1	0	0	0	0
97	(Wales) ****	début	Last Game	1	0	0	0	0
98	(Wales) ****	début	Last Game	1	0	0	0	0
99	(Wales) ****	début	Last Game	1	0	0	0	0
100	(Wales) ****	début	Last Game	1	0	0	0	0

Last updated on 2 September 2012.

== Current squad ==
North Wales Crusaders 2020 Squad
First team squad		Coaching staff
1 Tommy Johnson – FB; 2 Dave Eccleston – WG; 3 Jordan Penny – CE; 4 Earl Hurst – CE; 5 Rob Massam – WG; 6 Elliott Jenkins – SO; 7 Jordan Gibson – HB; 8 Brad Brennan – PR; 9 Brad Billsborough – HK; 10 Warren Thompson – PR; 11 Matt Reid – SR; 12 Gavin Rodden – SR; 13 Chris Barratt – LF	14 Steven Roper – SH; 15 Ryan Millington – SR; 16 Jordan Olmez – PR; 17 James Tilley – SR; 18; 19; 20; 21; 22; 23; 24; 25; 26	Head coach: Anthony Murray; Assistant coach: Jonny Leather; Legend: (c) Captain(s); (vc) Vice-captain(s)
