= 2012 North Wales Crusaders season =

Welsh rugby league season

- 2012 Championship 1 Rank: 8th
- Challenge Cup: 4th Round Lost to Wigan Warriors
- 2012 record: Wins: 8; losses: 12
- Points scored: For: 460; against: 628

Team information
- CEO: Jamie Thomas
- Head coach: (Wales) Clive Griffiths
- Captain: (England) Andy Moulsdale
- Stadium: Racecourse Ground
- Avg. attendance: 927
- High attendance: 1,513 v Barrow Raiders (11/03/12)

Top scorers
- Tries: Rob Massam 11
- Goals: Johnson 41
- Points: Johnson 94
List of seasons	2013 →

This article details the North Wales Crusaders Rugby League Football Club's 2012 season. This was the club's first ever season after reforming after the former Super League club Crusaders Rugby League folded.

The club was founded in late 2011 and officially joined Championship 1, the third tier of rugby league in the United Kingdom, on 11 October 2011. Their name, which continues the Crusaders branding, was selected in a fan contest. Clive Griffiths was confirmed as North Wales Crusaders Head Coach on 23 November and started his search for players. The club held open trials for any new players to attend, as well as scouring the local amateur game and signing players from Super League academies.

== Results ==
=== Pre-season ===
W Win D Draw L Loss

Pre-season results
Date	Versus	H/A	Venue	Result	Score	Tries	Goals	Attendance	Report
20 January	Leigh East	A	Leigh Sports Village	W	34–12	Hudson, Sheen (3), Mouladale, Massam	Smith (5)		
29 January	Rochdale Hornets	H	Racecourse Ground	W	50–22	Oakden, Massam (2), Mouladale (2), Brennan, Griffiths, Wilkes, Hulme & Kinsey	Smith (5)	751	NWC
5 February	Halifax U23s	H	Halton Stadium	W	62–0	Morison, Massam(2), Smith, Roets, C. Walker, Hayes, Durbin (2), Wilkes, Broadbent, Sheen, Walsh	Smith (3), Brennan, Broadbent	263	
18 February	Milford Marlins	A	Leeds Rhinos training ground	W	54–22	Brennan, Oakden, Smith, Roets, C. Walker (3), Other scorers unknown	Unknown		NWC
26 February	Thatto Heath Crusaders	A	Eirias Stadium	W	60–28	Wilkes, Smith (2), Sheen (2), Morison, Walsh, Massam, Tyrer, Hulme, Brown, Roets	Smith, Brennan (4), Sheen	396	NWC

=== 2012 Championship 1 ===
==== Table ====
2012 Championship 1
Pos	Team	Pld	W	D	L	GF	GA	GD	BP	Pts	Qualification
1	Doncaster (P)	18	15	0	3	717	347	+370	1	46	Promotion to 2013 Co-operative Championship and Champions play-offs
2	Barrow Raiders (P)	18	14	0	4	617	383	+234	3	45	Promotion to 2013 Co-operative Championship and Champions play-offs
3	Workington Town (P)	18	13	0	5	617	330	+287	4	43	Promotion to 2013 Co-operative Championship and Champions play-offs
4	Whitehaven R.L.F.C. (P)	18	12	0	6	549	421	+128	1	37	Promotion to 2013 Co-operative Championship and Champions play-offs
5	Rochdale Hornets (Q)	18	9	0	9	496	462	+34	1	28	Champions play-offs
6	Oldham (Q)	18	7	1	10	465	485	−20	5	27	Champions play-offs
7	London Skolars	18	7	1	10	558	560	−2	2	24	
8	North Wales Crusaders	18	7	0	11	460	628	−168	3	24	
9	South Wales Scorpions	18	4	0	14	365	680	−315	4	16	
10	Gateshead Thunder	18	1	0	17	276	824	−548	2	5	

Updated to match(es) played on 2 September 2012. Source: cooperativechampionship.co.uk and BBC Sport.
Rules for classification: 1st on competition points; 2nd on match points difference.
Competition points: For win = 3; For draw = 2; For loss by 12 points or fewer = 1.
(P) Promoted; (Q) Qualified for Playoffs

==== Championship 1 results ====
W Win D Draw L Loss

Championship 1 results
Date	Round	Versus	H/A	Venue	Result	Score	Tries	Goals	Attendance	Report
11 March	1	Barrow Raiders	H	Racecourse Ground	L	24–26	Moulsdale, Durbin, Massam (2), Brennan	Brennan (2)	1,513	NWC
18 March	2	London Skolars	A	New River Stadium	L	16–66	D. Hulme (2), Hudson	Johnson, Brennan	535	
1 April	3	Rochdale Hornets	H	Racecourse Ground	L	18–54	Wilkes, Massam, D. Hulme	Smith	1,047	
9 April	4	South Wales Scorpions	H	Racecourse Ground	W	34–22	Moulsdale, Johnson(2), Brennan (2), Smith, I. Brown	Smith (2), Cross	1,204	BBC, NWC
22 April	5	Workington Town	A	Derwent Park	L	0–58			776	
6 May	6	Oldham	A	Whitebank Stadium	W	36–32	Clay, Moulsdale, Broadbent, Clark, Morrison, Cross, Massam	Cross (4)	580	
13 May	7	Whitehaven	H	Racecourse Ground	L	10–17	Sheen (2)	Broadbent	804	BBC,
27 May	9	Doncaster	H	Racecourse Ground	L	28–41	Stephens, Sheen, Moulsdale, Massam, Clay	Broadbent (4)	705	BBC,
10 June	10	Oldham	H	Racecourse Ground	L	30–28	Brennan (3), Sheen, Clay, Smith	Broadbent, Johnson (2)	802	
24 June	11	Barrow Raiders	A	Craven Park	L	24–40	Gorski (2), Smith, Brennan	Johnson (4)	1,238	
1 July	12	Workington Town	H	Racecourse Ground	L	20–30	Wilkes, Massam, D. Hulme, McConnell	Johnson (2)	733	
8 July	8	Gateshead Thunder	H	Racecourse Ground	W	46–18	D. Hulme (2), Gorski, Clark, Durbin, L. Hulme, Smith, McConnell	Johnson (7)	719	BBC,
15 July	13	Gateshead Thunder	A	Thunderdome	W	60–10	Moulsdale (3), Sheen (3), Adamson, Brennan, J. Walker, L. Hulme	Johnson (10)	336	
22 July	14	Rochdale Hornets	A	Spotland	L	6–34	Sheen	Johnson	648	
5 August	15	South Wales Scorpions	A	The Gnoll	W	36–24	Gorski, Durbin, Massam, Clay (2), L. Hulme, Smith	Johnson (4)	687	BBC,
12 August	16	London Skolars	A	Racecourse Ground	W	40–22	Brennan, J. Walker, Massam, Weaver, Moulsdale, Smith, Clay	Johnson (6)	800	
19 August	17	Doncaster	A	Keepmoat Stadium	L	12–48	Moulsdale, Brennan	Johnson (2)	891	
2 September	18	Whitehaven	A	Recreation Ground	L	20–58	Massam (2), Gorski	Johnson (2)	701	

=== Carnegie Challenge Cup ===
W Win L Loss

Challenge Cup results
Date	Round	Versus	H/A	Venue	Result	Score	Tries	Goals	Attendance	Report
24 March	3	Toulouse Olympique	H	Racecourse Ground	W	28–10	Hulme (3), Johnson, Massam, Morrison, Moulsdale		567	
15 April	4	Wigan Warriors	A	DW Stadium	L	4–98	Owain Brown		4,198	BBC

== Players ==
=== Statistics ===
List of players with appearance number. If two players made their debut during the same game shirt numbers will decide which player comes first.

North Wales Crusaders Players
	Name	First Game	Last Game	Played	Tries	Goals	Drop Goals	Points
1	(England) Danny Hulme	Barrow Raiders 11/3/2012	South Wales Scorpions 5/8/2012	9	9	0	0	36
2	(England) Adam Walsh	Barrow Raiders 11/3/2012	Wigan Warriors 15/4/2012	3	0	0	0	0
3	(Wales) Christiaan Roets	Barrow Raiders 11/3/2012	Whitehaven RLFC 2/9/2012	11	0	0	0	0
4	(Wales) Rob Massam	Barrow Raiders 11/3/2012	Whitehaven RLFC 2/9/2012	19	11	0	0	44
5	(England) Chris Walker	Barrow Raiders 11/3/2012	Barrow Raiders 11/3/2012	1	0	0	0	0
6	(England) Andy Moulsdale	Barrow Raiders 11/3/2012	Whitehaven RLFC 2/9/2012	20	10	0	0	40
7	(England) Jamie Durbin	Barrow Raiders 11/3/2012	Doncaster 19/8/2012	13	3	0	0	12
8	(England) Chris Tyrer	Barrow Raiders 11/3/2012	Whitehaven RLFC 13/5/2012	9	0	0	0	0
9	(England) Lee Hudson	Barrow Raiders 11/3/2012	Whitehaven RLFC 2/9/2012	18	1	0	0	4
10	(England) Jonny Walker	Barrow Raiders 11/3/2012	Whitehaven RLFC 2/9/2012	20	2	0	0	8
11	(England) Leon Brennan	Barrow Raiders 11/3/2012	Whitehaven RLFC 2/9/2012	17	10	3	0	46
12	(England) Mark Hamon	Barrow Raiders 11/3/2012	Wigan Warriors 15/4/2012	12	10	0	0	40
13	(England) Jono Smith	Barrow Raiders 11/3/2012	Whitehaven RLFC 2/9/2012	16	6	3	0	30
14	(Wales) Owain Brown	Barrow Raiders 11/3/2012	Whitehaven RLFC 2/9/2012	14	1	0	0	4
15	(Wales) Iwan Brown	Barrow Raiders 11/3/2012	Barrow Raiders 24/6/2012	12	1	0	0	4
16	(England) Tommy Johnson	Barrow Raiders 11/3/2012	Whitehaven RLFC 2/9/2012	20	3	41	0	94
17	(England) Billy Sheen	Barrow Raiders 11/3/2012	Whitehaven RLFC 2/9/2012	14	8	0	0	32
18	(Wales) Kriss Wilkes	London Skolars 18/3/2012	Rochdale Hornets 03/7/2012	9	3	0	0	12
19	(England) Anthony Morrison	London Skolars 18/3/2012	Whitehaven RLFC 2/9/2012	15	2	0	0	8
20	(Republic of Ireland) Aaron McCloskey	London Skolars 18/3/2012	London Skolars 18/3/2012	1	0	0	0	0
21	(Republic of Ireland) Ian Cross	London Skolars 18/3/2012	Doncaster RLFC 27/5/2012	7	1	5	0	14
22	(England) Craig Lawton	Toulouse Olympique XIII 24/3/2012	Toulouse Olympique XIII 24/3/2012	1	0	0	0	0
23	(England) Kurt Haggerty	Rochdale Hornets 1/4/2012	Rochdale Hornets 1/4/2012	1	0	0	0	0
24	(England) Chris Lunt	Rochdale Hornets 1/4/2012	Whitehaven RLFC 13/5/2012	2	0	0	0	0
25	(England) Gareth Frodsham	Rochdale Hornets 1/4/2012	Oldham R.L.F.C. 6/5/2012	2	0	0	0	0
26	(England) Jamie Clark	South Wales Scorpions 9/4/2012	Rochdale Hornets 03/7/2012	11	2	0	0	8
27	(England) Sam Broadbent	Wigan Warriors 15/4/2012	Oldham R.L.F.C. 10/6/2012	5	1	6	0	16
28	(Wales) Owain Griffiths	Wigan Warriors 15/4/2012	Whitehaven RLFC 2/9/2012	8	0	0	0	0
29	(England) Adam Clay	Workington Town 22/4/2012	Whitehaven RLFC 2/9/2012	10	6	0	0	24
30	(England) Simon Stephens	Workington Town 22/4/2012	Whitehaven RLFC 2/9/2012	14	1	0	0	4
31	(England) Andy Gorski	Doncaster RLFC 27/5/2012	Whitehaven RLFC 2/9/2012	10	5	0	0	20
32	(England) Alex Trumper	Doncaster RLFC 27/5/2012	Barrow Raiders 24/6/2012	3	0	0	0	0
33	(England) Toby Adamson	Oldham R.L.F.C. 10/6/2012	Whitehaven RLFC 2/9/2012	8	1	0	0	4
34	(Scotland) Dave McConnell	Workington Town 1/7/2012	London Skolars 12/8/2012	5	2	0	0	8
35	(England) Liam Hulme	Gateshead Thunder 8/7/2012	Doncaster 19/8/2012	6	3	0	0	12
36	(England) Dave Orwell	Gateshead Thunder 15/7/2012	Rochdale Hornets 03/7/2012	2	0	0	0	0
37	(Wales) Lewys Weaver	London Skolars 12/8/2012	Whitehaven RLFC 2/9/2012	2	1	0	0	4

Last updated on 2 September 2012.

=== Squad ===
==== Playing squad ====
2012 North Wales Crusaders Squad
First team squad			Coaching staff
Toby Adamson – CE; Leon Brennan – SR; Sam Broadbent – CE; Owain Brown – PR, SR; Iwan Brown – SR; Jamie Clark – SR; Adam Clay – WG; Ian Cross – CE; Jamie Durbin – SH; Andy Gorski – SR; Owain Griffiths – HK, LF; Mark Hamon – SR; Lee Hudson – HK	Danny Hulme – FB; Tommy Johnson – FB; Craig Lawton – PR; Chris Lunt – HK; Rob Massam – WG; Aaron McCloskey – PR; Anthony Morrison – SR, LF; Andy Moulsdale (c) – SO; Andrew Oakden – PR; Christiaan Roets – SR, CE; Billy Sheen – HB; Jono Smith – LF, SR; Simon Stephens – FB	Alex Trumper; Chris Tyrer – PR; Jonny Walker – PR; Lewys Weaver – SO; Kriss Wilkes – WG	Head coach: Clive Griffiths; Assistant coach: John Fieldhouse; Legend: (c) Captain(s); (vc) Vice-captain(s); Updated: 23 January 2012; Source(s):

==== Provisional squad ====
As part of the 'Operational Guidelines' set out by the Rugby Football League, North Wales Crusaders were instructed to submit a provisional squad of 30 players for Championship 1 2012. Due to the club recruiting players they weren't in a position to do so. Crusaders decided to let supporters apply to become part of the provisional squad whilst they continued to sign players.

=== Transfers ===
==== Gains ====
Player	Previous club	Date signed
(Wales) Owain Brown	Leigh East	December 2011
(Wales) Iwan Brown	Halton Simms Cross	December 2011
(Wales) Rob Massam	Chester Gladiators	January 2012
(England) Danny Hulme	Widnes Vikings	January 2012
(England) Lee Hudson	Widnes Vikings	January 2012
(England) Chris Lunt	Widnes Vikings	January 2012
(England) Jamie Durbin	Leigh Centurions	January 2012
(England) Carl Leach	Warrington Bank Quay Bulls	January 2012
(England) Adam Walsh	Thatto Heath Crusaders	January 2012
(England) Jonny Walker	Leigh East	January 2012
(England) Andy Moulsdale	Warrington Ryland's Sharks	January 2012
(England) Chris Tyrer	Swinton Lions	January 2012
(England) Billy Sheen	Leigh Centurions	January 2012
(England) Anthony Morrison	Saddleworth Rangers	January 2012
(England) Jono Smith	Leigh East	January 2012
(England) David Hoctor	Ince Rose Bridge	January 2012
(Wales) Andrew Oakden	North Wales Crusaders juniors	January 2012
(England) Tommy Johnson	St Helens R.F.C.	January 2012
(Wales) Kriss Wilkes	Rochdale Hornets	January 2012
(England) Sam Broadbent	Chester Gladiators	January 2012
(England) Chris Kinsey	Widnes Vikings	January 2012
(England) Mark Harmon	Warrington Wolves	January 2012
(England) Leon Brennan	Leigh Miners Rangers	February 2012
(Wales) Christiaan Roets	South Wales Scorpions	February 2012
(England) Rob Hayes	Woolston Rovers	February 2012
(England) Craig Lawton	Wingham Tigers	February 2012
(England) Chris Walker	Oulton Raiders	February 2012
(England) Ben Mellor	Leigh Centurions	February 2012
(Wales) Owain Griffiths	Unatatched	February 2012
(England) Jamie Clark	Unatatched	April 2012
(England) Simon Stephens	Leigh East	April 2012
(England) Alex Trumper	Thatto Heath Crusaders	May 2012
(England) Toby Adamson	Salford City Reds	June 2012
(Wales) Lewys Weaver	London Wasps	July 2012
(England) Dave Orwell	Huddersfield Giants	July 2012

==== Loanees ====
Player	Parent club	Date
(Republic of Ireland) Aaron McCloskey	St Helens R.F.C.	March 2012
(Republic of Ireland) Ian Cross	St Helens R.F.C.	March 2012
(England) Kurt Haggerty	Widnes Vikings	March 2012
(England) Gareth Frodsham	Batley Bulldogs	2012
(England) Adam Clay	Leigh Centurions	2012
(England) Andy Gorski	Swinton Lions	May 2012
(Scotland) Dave McConnell	Swinton Lions	June 2012
(England) Liam Hulme	Warrington Wolves	July 2012

==== Losses ====
Player	New club	Date
(England) Carl Leach	Released	2012
(England) Adam Walsh	Thatto Heath Crusaders	2012
(England) Chris Tyrer	Released	2012
(England) David Hoctor	Released	2012
(England) Chris Kinsey	Released	2012
(England) Rob Hayes	Released	2012
(England) Craig Lawton	Released	2012
(England) Chris Walker	Released	2012
(England) Ben Mellor	Released	2012
(England) Chris Lunt	Released	2012
(England) Mark Harmon	Released	2012
