= 2013 North Wales Crusaders season =

Welsh rugby league season

- 2013 Championship 1 Rank: 1st
- Challenge Cup: Round 4
- National League Cup: Last 16

Team information
- CEO: (Wales) Jamie Thomas
- Head coach: (Wales) Clive Griffiths
- Captain: (England) Andy Moulsdale
- Stadium: Racecourse Ground
| ← 2012 | List of seasons | 2014 → |

This article details the North Wales Crusaders Rugby League Football Club's 2013 season. This is the club's second season after reforming following the former Super League club Crusaders Rugby League folding. The club will take part in Championship 1 for their second season. The club will be also taking part again in the Challenge Cup, and the National League Cup (known as the Northern Rail Cup for sponsorship reasons) for the first time in their short history.

== Results ==
=== Pre-season ===
W Win D Draw L Loss

Pre-season results
| Date | Versus | H/A | Venue | Result | Score | Tries | Goals | Attendance | Report |
|---|---|---|---|---|---|---|---|---|---|
| 29 December 2012 (Note: Ian Watson Testimonial) | Swinton Lions | A | Leigh Sports Village | L | 14-34 | Gorski, Massam, Adamson | Johnson (1/3) | 645 | |
| 13 January | York City Knights | A | Huntington Stadium | W | 38-16 | Weaver, Smith, Brennan, Massam, Moulsdale, Durbin, Reid | Weaver (5/7) | 312 | |
| 2 February | Thatto Heath Crusaders | A | Crusaders Park | W | 50-10 | Weaver, Walker, Smith, Reardon, Roets, Massam, Stephens (2), Kirby | Johnson (5/6), Weaver (2/3) | 200 | |
| 17 February | Coventry Bears | H | Racecourse Ground | W | 64-22 | Roets, Massam (2), Durbin, Braddish, Smith, Moulsdale (2), Stephens, Weaver, Johnson | Johnson (10/11) | 429 | |

=== Championship 1 ===
==== Table ====
2013 Championship 1
| Pos | Team | Pld | W | D | L | PF | PA | PD | BP | Pts | Qualification |
|---|---|---|---|---|---|---|---|---|---|---|---|
| 1 | North Wales Crusaders (P) | 16 | 14 | 0 | 2 | 568 | 212 | +356 | 1 | 43 | Qualified for promotion |
| 2 | Oldham | 16 | 12 | 1 | 3 | 508 | 289 | +219 | 3 | 41 | Qualified for play-offs |
| 3 | Rochdale Hornets | 16 | 10 | 0 | 6 | 538 | 375 | +163 | 2 | 32 | Qualified for play-offs |
| 4 | London Skolars | 16 | 9 | 1 | 6 | 489 | 468 | +21 | 3 | 32 | Qualified for play-offs |
| 5 | Hemel Stags | 16 | 8 | 0 | 8 | 381 | 365 | +16 | 4 | 28 | Qualified for play-offs |
| 6 | Oxford RLFC | 16 | 5 | 2 | 9 | 326 | 436 | −110 | 4 | 23 | Qualified for play-offs |
| 7 | Gateshead Thunder | 16 | 4 | 1 | 11 | 356 | 542 | −186 | 6 | 20 | |
| 8 | South Wales Scorpions | 16 | 5 | 0 | 11 | 368 | 504 | −136 | 4 | 19 | |
| 9 | Gloucestershire All Golds | 16 | 2 | 1 | 13 | 286 | 629 | −343 | 4 | 12 | |

Updated to match(es) played on 1 September 2013. Source: rugbyleaguechampionships.co.uk and Rugby League Project.
Rules for classification: 1st on competition points; 2nd on match points difference.
Competition points: For win = 3; For draw = 2; For loss by 12 points or fewer = 1
(P) Promoted

==== Championship 1 results ====
W Win D Draw L Loss

Championship 1 results
| Date | Round | Versus | H/A | Venue | Result | Score | Tries | Goals | Attendance | Report |
|---|---|---|---|---|---|---|---|---|---|---|
| 1 April | 1 | South Wales Scorpions | A | The Gnoll | W | 34-12 | Middlehurst (3), Moulsdale (2), Smith | Johnson (5/6) | 675 | |
| 14 April | 2 | London Skolars | H | Racecourse Ground | W | 44-6 | Gorski (2), Massam (2), Brennan, Middlehurst, Roets, Smith | Johnson (6/8) | 741 | |
| 28 April | 3 | Gateshead Thunder | H | Racecourse Ground | W | 52-8 | Massam (2), White (2), Brennan, Brown, Hudson, Johnson, McDonald, Weaver | Johnson (6/10) | 752 | |
| 5 May | 4 | Rochdale Hornets | A | Spotland | W | 35-18 | Massam (2), Brennan, Johnson, Middlehurst, Smith, Weaver | Johnson (6/7), Durbin (DG) | 769 | |
| 12 May | 5 | Oxford Rugby League | A | Iffley Road | W | 12-4 | Moulsdale, McDonald | Johnson (2/2) | 374 | |
| 2 June | 7 | Gloucestershire All Golds | H | Racecourse Ground | W | 66-4 | Middlehurst (3), Brennan (2), Johnson (2), Adamson, Braddish, Clarke, Massam, Reardon | Johnson (9/12) | 851 | |
| 9 June | 8 | Oldham R.L.F.C. | H | Racecourse Ground | W | 22-20 | Middlehurst (2), Birkett, Johnson | Johnson (3/5) | 962 | |
| 16 June | 9 | Hemel Stags | A | Pennine Way | L | 10-18 | Birkett, Middlehurst | Johnson (1/2) | 539 | |
| 23 June | 10 | Gloucestershire All Golds | A | Gloucestershire University | W | 58-16 | Smith (3), Massam (2), Birkett, Griffiths, Middlehurst, Reardon, White | Birkett (9/10) | 122 | |
| 30 June | 11 | Rochdale Hornets | H | Racecourse Ground | W | 48-0 | Massam (5), Adamson, Bannister, Dallimore, Moulsdale | Johnson (5/9) | 1,084 | |
| 28 July | 14 | Oldham R.L.F.C. | A | Whitebank Stadium | L | 10-28 | Birkett, Smith | Johnson (1/2) | 1,209 | |
| 04 August | 15 | Gateshead Thunder | A | Filtrona Park, South Shields | W | 24-20 | Brennan, Durbin, Johnson, McConnell | Johnson (4/4) | 193 | |
| 11 August | 16 | Hemel Stags | H | Racecourse Ground | W | 44-12 | Moulsdale (3), Birkett (2), McConnell, Johnson | Johnson (6/8) | 813 | |
| 18 August | 17 | Oxford Rugby League | H | Racecourse Ground | W | 54-10 | Brennan (3), Bannister (2), Massam (2), Stephens (2) | Johnson (9/9) | 805 | |
| 23 August | 13 | London Skolars | A | New River Stadium | W | 20-14 | Adamson, Brennan, Smith | Johnson (4/4) | 1,276 | |
| 1 September | 18 | South Wales Scorpions | H | Racecourse Ground | W | 35-22 | Massam (2), Bannister, Brennan, Griffiths, Moulsdale, McDonnell | Johnson (3/7), Moulsdale (DG) | 1,562 | |

- Byes in Round 6 and 12

=== Northern Rail Cup results ===
W Win D Draw L Loss

Northern Rail Cup results
| Date | Round | Versus | H/A | Venue | Result | Score | Tries | Goals | Attendance | Report |
|---|---|---|---|---|---|---|---|---|---|---|
| 3 March | Group | Oldham R.L.F.C. | H | Racecourse Ground | W | 48-12 | Smith (2), Durbin, Massam, Roets, Middlehurst, Brennan, Reardon | Johnson (8/8) | 721 | |
| 10 March | Group | Gateshead Thunder | A | Thunderdome | W | 30-4 | Reardon (2), Brennan, Massam, Moulsdale, Middlehurst | Johnson (3/6) | 228 | |
| 17 March | Group | Rochdale Hornets | H | Racecourse Ground | W | 30-16 | Johnson, McConnell, Massam (2), Stephens | Johnson (5/5) | 693 | |
| 21 March | Group | Hemel Stags | A | Pennine Way | W | 36-24 | Brennan (2), Brophy, Sheen, Stephens, White | White (6/6) | 129 | |
| 19 May | Last 16 | Swinton Lions | A | Leigh Sports Village | L | 18-26 | Birkett (2), Dallimore, Middlehurst | Weaver (1/4) | 544 | |
| 20 July | Bowl final | London Skolars | N | The Shay | W | 42-24 | McConnell (2), Birkett, Johnson, Massam, Middlehurst, Moulsdale, Roets | Johnson (5/9) | | |

=== Tetleys Challenge Cup results ===
W Win L Loss

Challenge Cup results
| Date | Round | Versus | H/A | Venue | Result | Score | Tries | Goals | Attendance | Report |
|---|---|---|---|---|---|---|---|---|---|---|
| 6 April | 3 | West Hull | N | Wilderspool Stadium | W | 82-6 | Weaver (3), Johnson (2), Massam (2), Reardon (2), Smith (2), Gorski, Moulsdale, McConnell, White | Johnson (11/15) | 451 | |
| 21 April | 4 | Hull F.C. | A | KC Stadium | L | 6-62 | Roets | Johnson (1/1) | 3,879 | |

== Players ==
=== Statistics ===
- Top try scorer: Rob Massam (25)
- Top goal scorer: Tommy Johnson (101)
- Top points scorer: Tommy Johnson (246)

=== Squad ===
2013 North Wales Crusaders Squad
| First team squad | | | Coaching staff |
|---|---|---|---|
| 1 Tommy Johnson – FB; 2 Lewys Weaver – WG, FB; 3 Christiaan Roets – CE, SR; 4 Leon Brennan – CE; 5 Rob Massam – WG; 6 Andy Moulsdale (c) – SO; 7 Jamie Durbin – SH; 8 Jonny Walker – PR, SR; 9 Lee Hudson – HK; 10 Phil Braddish – PR; 11 Andy Gorski – SR; 12 Gary Middlehurst – SR, LF; 13 Jono Smith – LF, SR | 14 Dave McConnell – HK; 15 Toby Adamson – CE, SR; 16 Ryan MacDonald – PR; 17 Stuart Reardon – FB, WG, CE; 18 North Wales Crusaders Supporters; 19 Adam Bowman – PR; 20 Billy Sheen – HB; 21 Simon Stephens – PR; 22 Kriss Wilkes – WG, CE; 23 Craig White – SR; 24 Steve McDermott – HK, PR; 25 Owain Griffiths – HK, LF; 26 Matt Reid – SO | 27 Jamie Clark – SR; 28 Andrew Oakden – WG; 29 Stephen Bannister – SR, LF; 30 Owain Brown – PR | Head coach: Clive Griffiths; Assistant coach: John Fieldhouse; Legend: (c) Captain(s); (vc) Vice-captain(s); Updated: 21 February 2013; Source(s): 2013 Squad Numbers |

=== Transfers ===
==== Gains ====
| Player | Previous club | Date signed |
|---|---|---|
| (England) Gary Middlehurst | Rochdale Hornets | October 2012 |
| (England) Phil Braddish | Rochdale Hornets | October 2012 |
| (England) Stuart Reardon | AS Carcassonne | October 2012 |
| (Scotland) Dave McConnell | Swinton Lions | October 2012 |
| (England) Andy Gorski | Swinton Lions | October 2012 |
| (England) Adam Bowman | Rochdale Hornets | October 2012 |
| (Scotland) Ryan MacDonald | Workington Town | October 2012 |
| (England) Steve McDermott | Rochdale Hornets | November 2012 |

==== Losses ====
| Player | New club | Date |
|---|---|---|
| (England) Anthony Morrison | Old Bar Beach Pirates | October 2012 |
| (Wales) Iwan Brown | | |
| (England) Danny Hulme | | |
| (England) Dave Orwell | Released | |
| (England) Alex Trumper | Released | |
