= North Wales Crusaders statistics and records =

Statistics and records for North Wales Crusaders

This page details statistics and records regarding the North Wales Crusaders Rugby League club. This includes competitive matches following their inception in 2012.

== Team records ==
=== General ===
- Biggest winning margin: 100 (110–0 v. Bedford Tigers at Eirias Stadium, 25 January 2026)
- Biggest losing margin: 134 (134–0 v. London Broncos at Eirias Stadium, 7 June 2026)
- Most points scored: 110 (110–0 v. Bedford Tigers at Eirias Stadium, 25 January 2026)
- Most points conceded: 134 (134–0 v. London Broncos at Eirias Stadium, 7 June 2026)
- Longest winning run: 8 matches (27 March 2022 to 14 May 2022)
- Longest losing run: 8 matches (22 June 2014 to 10 August 2014)

As of 7 June 2026

== Coaching records ==
Name	Tenure		Matches		Super League		Championship		Championship 1 League 1		Challenge Cup		Other Cups (Note: Championship Cup (2012–13), League 1 Cup (2015–2017) and 1895 Cup (2019–))		Ref
Name	From	To	Won	%	Won	%	Won	%	Won	%	Won	%	Won	%	Ref
Clive Griffiths	November 2011	June 2014	35/61	57	—N/a		6/15	40	21/34	62	3/6	50	5/6	83	
Anthony Murray	June 2014	September 2016	30/64	41	—N/a		1/11	9	23/44	51	2/4	67	4/5	80	
Mike Grady	October 2016	March 2018	15/32	47	—N/a		—N/a		11/25	44	1/3	33	3/4	75	
Anthony Murray	March 2018	2022	50/94	53	—N/a		—N/a		45/86	52	5/8	63	—N/a		
Carl Forster	November 2022	4 October 2025	36/70	51	—N/a		—N/a		32/60	53	3/6	50	1/4	25	
Dean Muir	October 2025	March 2026	3/8	38	—N/a		2/6	33	—N/a		1/2	50	—N/a		
Krisnan Inu	March 2026	2026	1/3	33	—N/a		1/3	33	—N/a		—N/a		—N/a		
Sean Long	May 2026	June 2026	1/3	33	—N/a		1/3	33	—N/a		—N/a		—N/a		
Mike Grady	June 2026	July 2026	0/6	0	—N/a		0/6	0	—N/a		—N/a		—N/a		

As of 19 July 2026 (2026 Championship: Round 20)

== Player records ==
=== Top scorers by season ===
Year	Top try scorer		Top goal scorer		Top points scorer		Ref
Year	Player	Total	Player	Total	Player	Total	Ref
2012	Rob Massam	11	Tommy Johnson	41	Tommy Johnson	94	
2013	Rob Massam	25	Tommy Johnson	101	Tommy Johnson	246	
2014	Rob Massam	10	Tommy Johnson	69	Tommy Johnson	174	(Note: RLP source notes incomplete data)
2015	Rob Massam	29	Tommy Johnson	109	Tommy Johnson	266	
2016	Rob Massam	22	Tommy Johnson	70	Tommy Johnson	152	
2017	Ryan Smith	14	Tommy Johnson	87	Tommy Johnson	222	
2018	Dale Bloomfield	13	Tommy Johnson	65	Tommy Johnson	154	
2019	Rob Massam	20	Ben Stead	56	Ben Stead	128	
2020	Gavin Rodden	5	Tommy Johnson	13	Tommy Johnson	26	(Note: League 1 season abandoned after round 3)
2021	Rob Massam	22	Tommy Johnson	66	Tommy Johnson	172	
2022	Rob Massam	20	Tommy Johnson	107	Tommy Johnson	270	(Note: RLP source notes incomplete data)
2023	Rob Massam	14	Brad Billsborough	68	Brad Billsborough	144	
2024	Patrick Ah Van	11	Ben Lane	26	Ben Lane	76	
2025	Sam Wilde	23	Jamie Dallimore	48	Jordy Gibson	116	

=== Appearances ===
Rank	Name	Apps	Ref
1	Tommy Johnson	209	
2	Rob Massam	195	
3	Jonny Walker	148	
4	Jack Houghton	148	
5	Lee Hudson	123	
6	Chris Barrett	119	
7	Matt Reid	110	
8	Karl Ashall	99	
9	Patrick Ah Van	87	
10=	Stephen Wild	85	
10=	Ryan Smith	85	

As of 2 June 2026

=== Points ===
Rank	Name	Points
1	Tommy Johnson	1,794
2	Rob Massam	728
3	Brad Billsborough	217
4	Jamie Dallimore	211
5	Jordy Gibson	210
6	Patrick Ah Van	206
7	Jono Smith	190
8	Matt Reid	176
9	Kenny Baker	152
10	Gavin Rodden	140

As of 2 June 2026

=== Tries ===
Rank	Name	Points
1	Rob Massam	182
2	Tommy Johnson	80
3	Patrick Ah Van	49
4	Jono Smith	46
5	Matt Reid	44
6	Gavin Rodden	35
7	Chris Barrett	31
8=	Kenny Baker	30
8=	Jordy Gibson	30
10	Ryan Smith	29

As of 2 June 2026

=== Goals ===
Rank	Name	Goals	FG
1	Tommy Johnson	737	–
2	Brad Billsborough	88	1
3	Ben Stead	56	–
4	Jamie Dallimore	51	1
5	Jordy Gibson	44	2

As of 2 June 2026

== Firsts ==
=== Games ===
- First game: Friendly V Leigh East at Leigh Sports Village on 20/1/12. Won 12-34
- First competitive game: Championship 1 game V Barrow Raiders at Racecourse Ground on 11/3/12. Lost 24-26
- First Challenge Cup game: V Toulouse Olympique at Racecourse Ground on 24/3/12. Won 28-10
- First win: Challenge Cup game V Toulouse Olympique at Racecourse Ground on 34/3/12. Won 28-10

=== Players ===
- First try: Lee Hudson v Leigh East on 20/1/12.
- First competitive try: Andy Moulsdale v Barrow Raiders on 11/3/12.
