= Rhys Griffiths =

Rhys Griffiths may refer to:

- Rhys Griffiths (footballer) (born 1980), Welsh football striker
- Rhys Griffiths (rugby league), English rugby league footballer
- Rhys Adrian Griffiths, British playwright and screenwriter
