= Ian Cross =

Ian Cross may refer to:

- Ian Cross (writer), New Zealand novelist, journalist and administrator
- Ian Cross (RAF officer), British WWII officer and bomber pilot
- Ian Cross (rugby league), Irish rugby league and rugby union footballer
