= List of North Wales Crusaders seasons =

The following is a list of North Wales Crusaders seasons:

== Seasons ==
Season	League										Challenge Cup	Other Competitions		Refs
Season	Division	P	W	D	L	F	A	Pts	Pos	Play-offs	Challenge Cup	Other Competitions		Refs
2012	Championship 1	18	7	0	11	460	628	24	8th	Did not qualify	R4			
2013	Championship 1	16	14	0	2	568	212	43	1st	Promoted as Champions	R4	Championship Cup	Last 16	
2013	Championship 1	16	14	0	2	568	212	43	1st	Promoted as Champions	R4	Bowl	W	
2014	Championship	26	7	0	19	468	709	31	11th	Did not qualify	R4			
2015	Championship 1	22	14	1	7	677	391	29	5th	Lost in Semi Final	R5	League 1 Cup	W	
2016	League 1	14	5	2	7	336	355	12	10th	Lost in Shield Final	R3	League 1 Cup	R1	
2017	League 1	15	7	1	7	366	422	15	9th	Third Place	R3	League 1 Cup	RU	
2018	League 1	26	9	1	16	589	660	19	10th	Did not qualify	R4			
2019	League 1	20	9	0	11	489	501	18	7th	Did not qualify	R4			
2020	League 1	League abandoned due to the COVID-19 pandemic									R4			
2021	League 1	17	11	0	6	539	410	22	3rd	Lost in Semi Final	Did not participate			
2022	League 1	20	15	0	5	708	420	30	3rd	Lost in Semi Final	R5			
2023	League 1	18	7	0	11	520	437	14	6th	Lost in Promotion Final	R4			
2024	League One	20	8	0	12	464	472	16	7th	Did not qualify	R3			
2025	League One	18	14	0	4	568	236	28	1st	None (Note: Champions do not enter League One playoffs)	R3	1895 Cup	PR2	
2026	Championship	24	3	0	21	282	1736	−6	20th	Did not qualify	R3	1895 Cup	R1	

== See also ==
- Crusaders Rugby League#Seasons
