= Connor Aspey =

English rugby league footballer

Personal information
- Full name: Connor Aspey
- Born: 16 April 2002 (age 23) Wigan, Greater Manchester, England
- Height: 5 ft 11 in (1.80 m)
- Weight: 14 st 0 lb (89 kg)

Playing information
- Position: Hooker
Club
Years	Team	Pld	T	G	FG	P
2020–22	Salford Red Devils	1	0	0	0	0
2021(loan)	→Newcastle Thunder	1	0	0	0	0
2021(loan)	→North Wales Crusaders	2	3	0	0	0
2022(loan)	→Rochdale Hornets	16	5	0	0	20
2023–	Rochdale Hornets	0	0	0	0	0
	Total	20	8	0	0	20
- Source: As of 14 January 2023

Connor Aspey (born 16 April 2002) is an English professional rugby league footballer who plays as a hooker for Rochdale Hornets in the RFL League 1.

== Club career ==
=== Salford Red Devils ===
In 2020 he made his Salford début in the Super League against Hull Kingston Rovers.

=== Newcastle Thunder (loan) ===
On 24 Mar 2021 it was reported that he had signed a short-term loan for the Newcastle Thunder in the RFL Championship.

=== Rochdale Hornets (loan) ===
On 4 Nov 2021 it was reported that he had signed for Rochdale Hornets in the RFL League 1 on loan
