= Kenny Hughes (rugby league) =

Rugby league footballer

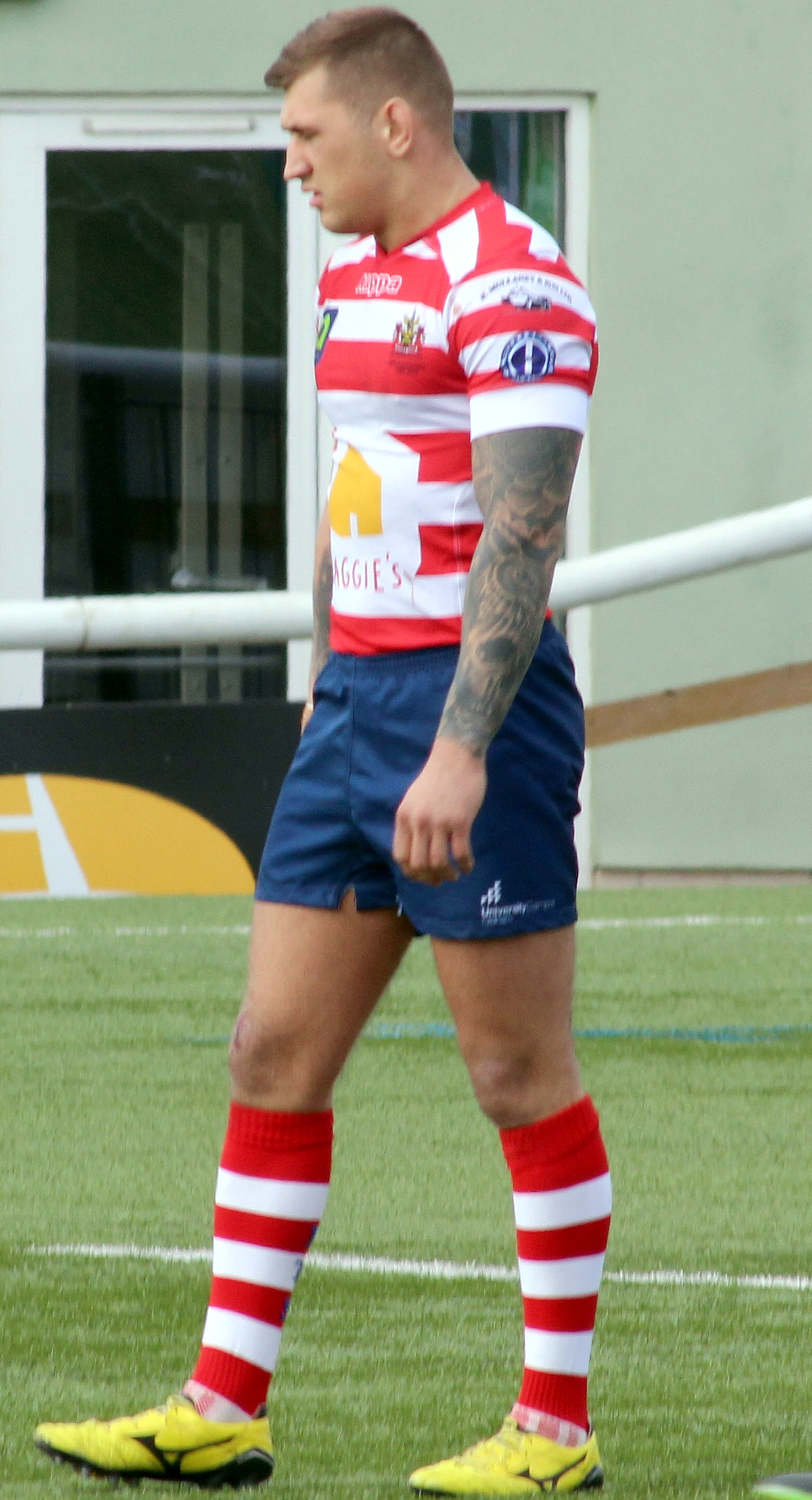

Personal information
- Full name: Kenneth Hughes
- Born: 13 September 1990 (age 35)
- Height: 1.75 m (5 ft 9 in)
- Weight: 78 kg (12 st 4 lb)

Playing information
- Position: Hooker
Club
Years	Team	Pld	T	G	FG	P
2013–18	Oldham	137	26	0	0	104
2019–	North Wales Crusaders	13	0	0	0	0
	Total	150	26	0	0	104
- Source: As of 25 July 2019

Kenny Hughes (born 13 September 1990) is a professional rugby league footballer who plays for the North Wales Crusaders in League 1. He plays as a hooker.

Hughes came through the St Helens academy and joined Oldham to play in the reserves in 2011.

Hughes previously played for Oldham in the Championship and League 1.
