= Adam Clay (disambiguation) =

Adam Clay (born 1990) is an English rugby league footballer.

Adam Clay may also refer to:

- Adam Clay, Captain Boomerang#Other versions
- Adam Clay, protagonist of the 2024 film The Beekeeper
