= St Ambrose College =

School in Hale Barns, Greater Manchester, England

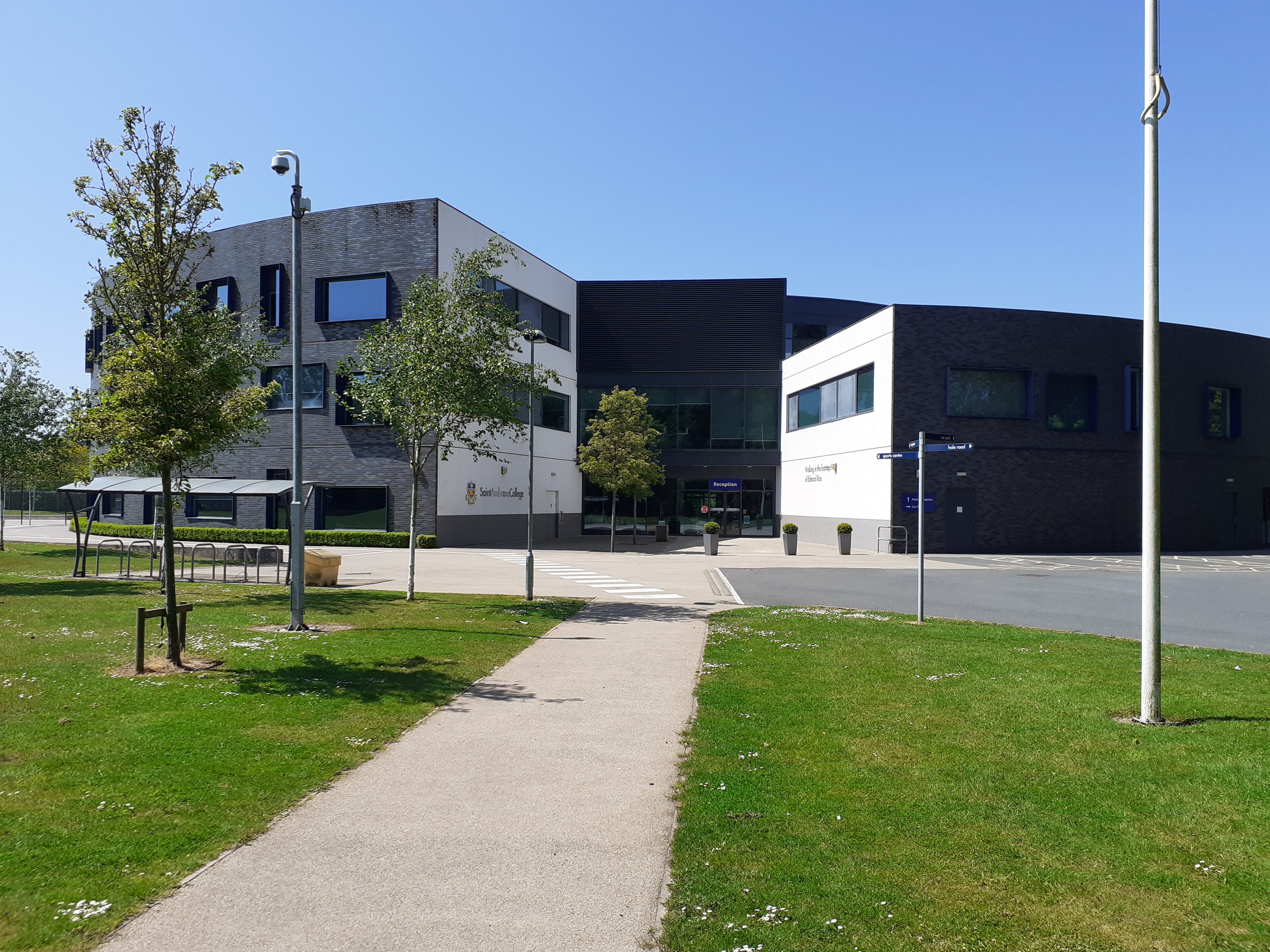
- Saint Ambrose College Main Entrance

Location
- Hale Road; Hale Barns; Altrincham, Greater Manchester; England; 53.370533°N 2.319741°W

Information
- Type: Christian Brothers' grammar school; Academy
- Motto: Vitam impendere vero
- Religious affiliation: Roman Catholic
- Established: 1946
- Department for Education URN: 138134 Tables
- Ofsted: Reports
- Head teacher: Dermot Rainey
- Chaplain: Tom Murray
- Gender: Boys
- Age: 11 to 18
- Enrolment: 1,055
- Houses: Aquinas, Augustine, Ignatius, Newman
- Colours: Blue, Green, Red, Yellow
- Alumni name: Old Ambrosians
- Website: http://www.st-ambrosecollege.org.uk/

St Ambrose College is an 11–18 Christian Brothers' Roman Catholic boys' grammar school in Hale Barns, Altrincham, Greater Manchester, England. It was founded in 1946 by Joseph Robertson. In 2012 the school became an academy, and was completely re-built. Upon leaving the college, boys are referred to as ‘Old Ambrosians’, and many go on to join the Old Boys' Association. The school has a prominent history in Rugby union, with many former pupils becoming professional players. In 2025, both the school's 1st XV, and its U16 team won the Cheshire Cup, its U16 team also reached the National Cup Quarter Final.

== History ==
=== Establishment ===
St Ambrose College, was founded during the Second World War by a group of evacuees. Arriving in Hale in 1940 from Les Vauxbelets College in Guernsey, the Brothers, and a small group of students soon found suitable accommodation and re-established their school. Towards the end of June 1940, when the Channel Islands were about to be occupied by the German army, the parents of boys attending Les Vauxbelets College, were asked to decide whether they should allow their sons to be evacuated to Great Britain or keep them at home with all the attendant risks (hunger, forced labour, etc.).

The college was in the charge of the French Province of the Brothers of De La Salle and they had promised that an appropriate number of the community would accompany the evacuees to care for them and to ensure that, as far as possible, their education did not suffer.

Having started with just the boys from Guernsey, in shared accommodation in Hale and keeping the Guernsey name, Les Vauxbelets College, the Brothers acquired a large house in Bowdon as college premises and permission was obtained for the college to accept local boys. The college adopted the name St Ambrose College after Ambrose Moriarty, then the Roman Catholic Bishop of Shrewsbury.

=== World War II ===
During the war the college began to grow in popularity. At the end of the war, in the late summer of 1945, the De La Salle Brothers returned to Guernsey, and left a thriving school in the hands of the Irish Christian Brothers. The college moved to fresh premises, a large house with extensive grounds in Hale Barns. The college retains its original badge, motto, and colours to this day.

=== Recent history ===
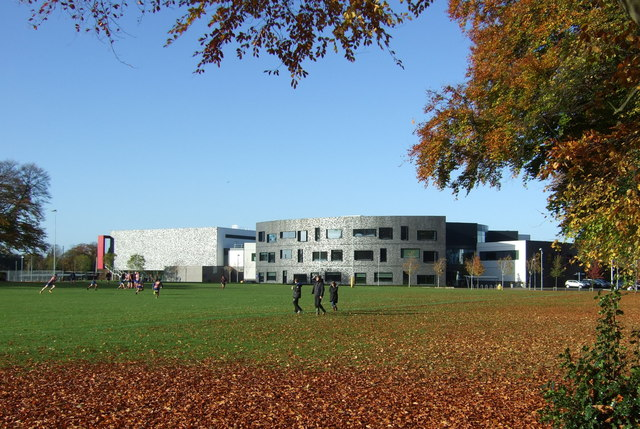
St Ambrose College in 2016

In April 2004, after the school's second bid for specialist status in six months failed, the headmaster Michael Thompson accused the Department of Education of bias. He claimed that when he asked officials why the bid was unsuccessful, he was told that it was "too Catholic". Member of Parliament for Altrincham and Sale West, Graham Brady called for an inquiry to be held. In 2005, St Ambrose College gained specialist status in mathematics and computing, allowing it to give precedence to the named subjects and bringing a capital grant of £150,000 as well as an annual allowance of £120,000. The money has been spent on computers, projectors and generally modernising the classrooms.

In 2005, St Ambrose College were national champions in the FIRST Lego League. In 2010, house groups were reintroduced into the school, following much planning by senior management. Aquinas (blue), Augustine (green), Ignatius (red), and Newman (yellow) houses are now prominent within the school, especially on uniform, which now entails a coloured badge representing the pupil's house. The Sixth Form has been given a more visible role, giving presentations and talks during assemblies and during a Thursday morning tutor period. Prefects, Senior Prefects, Vice House Captains, House Captains, the Deputy Head Boys, and Head Boys, all have new ties, as well as badges which relate to their house.

The Office for Standards in Education, Children's Services and Skills (Ofsted) carried out an inspection in November 2005. The report noted that the school's buildings were "old and cramped and at times this makes learning difficult". St Ambrose College, which was considered the school in Trafford "most in need of a new building", was awarded £17 million in July 2006 to completely rebuild. Construction company Balfour Beatty was awarded the contract in January 2010 after a bidding process.

In December 2012, the college was implicated in a child sex abuse case involving teaching staff carrying out acts of abuse both on and off school grounds. More than fifty former pupils contacted police, either as victims of, or witnesses to, sexual abuse. The alleged sexual abuse occurred 1962-1990s.

On 15 July 2013 Alan Morris, a former teacher, was charged with 41 counts of indecent assault following an investigation. He was accused of committing the offences 1972-1991 and the allegations involve 29 former pupils, who were between 11 and 17 at the time. He was also charged with one count of outraging public decency and five of inciting gross indecency. He was found guilty, and sentenced to nine years jail in August 2014. An overall total of 47 indictments were issued, with at least 27 made public since Morris was convicted.

In November 2014 two long-serving senior teachers at the school were suspended following allegations that they had knowledge of the abuse at the time. They were both cleared, and returned to teach at the school in June 2015. In 2018, the school issued a "full and unreserved" apology to victims of Morris.

== Overview ==
=== Academic attainment ===
In 2010, the Trafford Local Education Authority was ranked seventh out of 150 in the country – and first out of Greater Manchester's 10 LEAs – based on the percentage of pupils attaining at least 5 A*–C grades at General Certificate of Secondary Education (GCSE) including maths and English (100% compared with the national average of 50.7%). St Ambrose College was the sixth out of 19 secondary schools in the borough in terms of proportion of pupils achieving at least five GCSEs A*–C (92%). For A-level results, the school was ranked fifth out of nine schools in Trafford, with pupils averaging 955.7 points compared to the national average of 739.1.

=== Uniform ===
Originally, pupils wore a blue blazer with red piping. This then became a blue blazer with red stripes. However, it was felt that this was too 'garish', so it transferred to the black blazers with the college shield emblazoned on the breast pocket, which is still worn to this day.

Sixth Formers had a similar dress code to other pupils, but they wore a different tie. This had beehives on it in a nod to the story that a swarm of bees landed on Saint Ambrose when he was a baby. It was a long-held tradition, as far back as at least the early 1960s, that prefects wore gowns. This continued as recently as 2015, but was then suddenly and inexplicably phased out. Prefects came to wear a separate tie to mark their position, which continues to this day. The Head Boy and Deputy Head Boys, collectively referred to as the Head Boy team, always chosen from the Upper Sixth, wear blue blazers with the college shield emblazoned on the breast pocket. The Head Boy Team, Senior Prefects, and House Captain all wore the same model of tie, while Prefects and Vice-House captains wore a different model.

In 2018, it was decided to allow Sixth Formers to wear their own suits. The Upper Sixth of that year had the option of wearing the old Sixth Form uniform, but all other Sixth Form cohorts since have had to wear their own suits. A new Sixth Form tie was also introduced. In 2020, the Student Leadership Team was slimmed down. All members now wore the same tie, as opposed to a different tie for different positions. The standard prefect tie was the model that was retained.

Sporting achievements are recognised at the annual Sports Presentation Dinner. Here, all those who have played in school teams throughout the year are awarded a 'colour' which is then worn on the individual's left blazer pocket, and the House Champion of the last academic year is announced.

=== Saint Ambrose relations ===
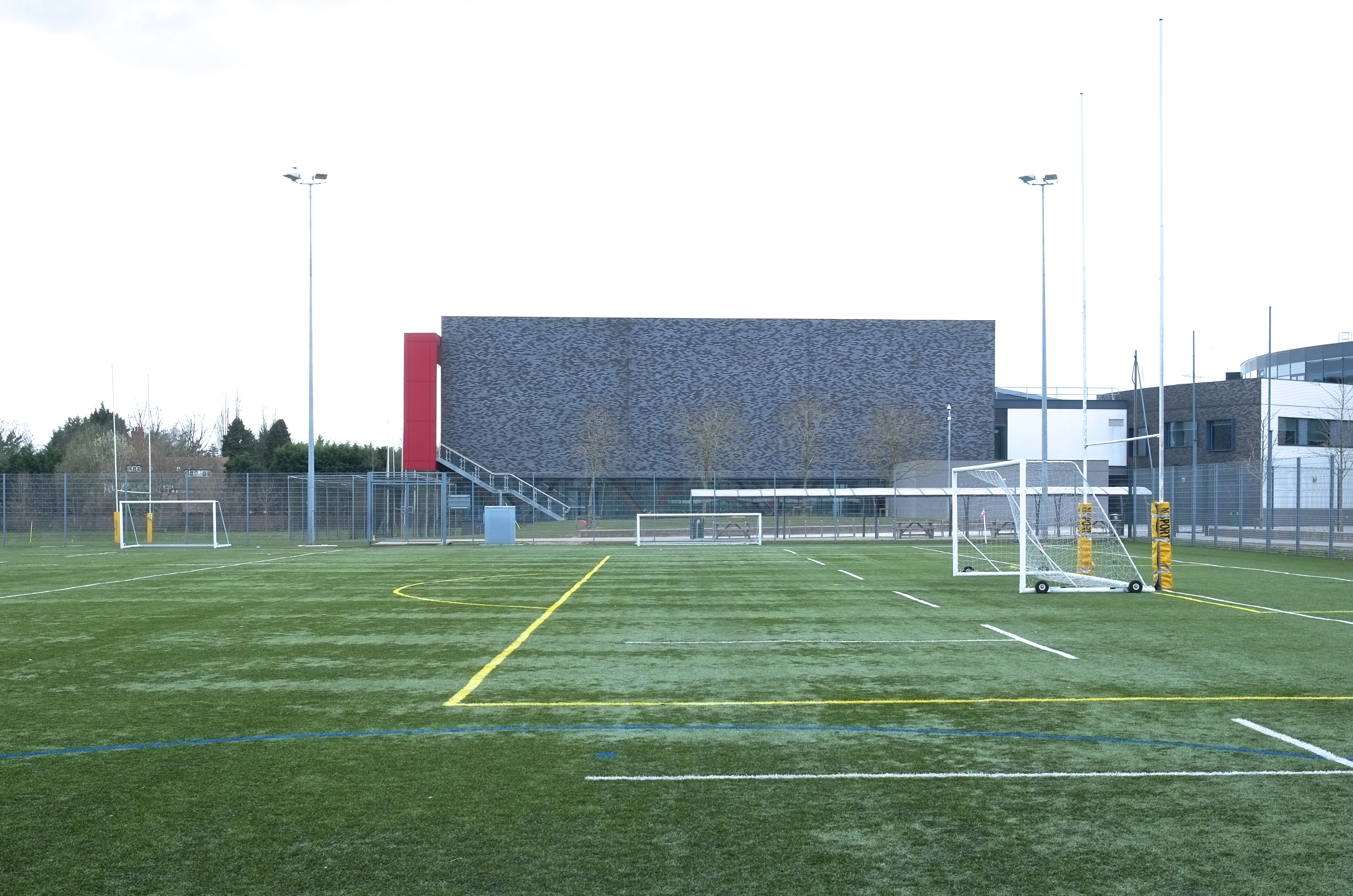
St Ambrose College sports fields

St Ambrose College has strong relationships with the history and ethos of Saint Ambrose, for instance the insignia on the old sixth form ties were bee hives as, legend has it a swarm of bees settled on St Ambrose's face whilst he lay in his cradle, leaving behind a drop of honey. His father considered this a sign of his future eloquence and honeyed-tongue. For this reason, bees and beehives often appear in the saint's symbology.

There was originally a miniature Celtic cross buried in the foundations of the school.

=== Extra–curricular activities ===
The Old Boys Game is held annually. The player of the match is awarded the Sean Ferguson trophy.

Traditionally, Speech Night was the highlight of the school's calendar. This was held at the Bridgewater Hall, and saw all of the last years academic certificates officially awarded, as well as performances by various student musical ensembles. Awards for sporting excellence and academic achievement were also awarded. Speeches were also given by the headmaster, the chair of the board of governors, and the Lord Lieutenant of Greater Manchester, with the evening culminating in the speech by the head boy. At the conclusion of his speech, the head boy asks the headmaster a variation on the question "So please sir, could we have tomorrow off?" after thanking the boys for the effort they have put into the event. This tradition recalls a previous head boy who first surprised the head master with this request, which has always been accepted, giving the whole school a day off after Speech Night.

== Headmasters and principals ==
- Brother J. J. Dowling (1945–1948)
- Brother E. L. Casey (1948–1954)
- Brother D. C. Phelan (1954–1958)
- Brother P. C. Carey (1958–1961)
- Brother W. D. Foley, O.B.E. (1961–1967)
- Brother J. C. Gleeson (1967–1973)
- Brother J. C. Ring (1973–1979)
- Brother P. F. Rynne (1979–83) (Note: Brother P. F. Rynne suffered after a fire at Woodeaves on Tuesday 15 November 1983. Due to his injuries he was unable to continue to fulfil his roles so his time as headmaster was prematurely ended.)
- Brother J. J. Sheehan (1983–1984) (Note: Brother Sheehan, a Deputy Headmaster, became Acting Headmaster until the end of the 1984 academic year when a permanent replacement could be found.)
- Brother T. C. Coleman (1984–91)
- Mr G. E. Hester (1991–1999)
- Mr P. Howard (1999–2000) (Note: Acting headmaster)
- Mr M. D. Thompson (2000–2015)
- Mr J. M. Keulemans (2015–2017) (Note: Mr J. M. Keulemans handed in his notice on the role of Principal without giving the correct length of notice, late in the academic year of 2018. Saint Ambrose College governors chose Vice Principal Mr D. Rainey to be Acting Principal. He was deemed to have done a satisfactory role and so became Principal in summer 2019.)
- Mr D. Rainey (2017 – present)

== Notable Old Ambrosians ==
Alumni of St Ambrose College include:

=== Academia ===
- Sir John Bernard Pethica, Professor of Material Sciences at Trinity College, Dublin
- Kieran Moriarty, physician, scientist

=== Athletes ===
- Luke Adamson, English rugby league and rugby union footballer
- Mark Atkinson, rugby union footballer
- Ciaran Booth, rugby union footballer
- Connor Doherty, English rugby union footballer
- Rory Finneran, Irish association footballer
- Charlie Mulchrone, English rugby union footballer
- Fergus Mulchrone, English rugby union footballer
- Dylan O'Grady, Irish rugby union footballer
- Ciaran Parker, English rugby union footballer
- Mike Worsley, former rugby union footballer for England and Harlequins
- Toby Adamson, rugby league footballer
- Raffi Quirke, English rugby union footballer

=== Arts and entertainment ===
- Peter Anghelides, science fiction author
- Keith Breeden, artist and creator of the cover for Pink Floyd's album The Division Bell
- Lonnie Donegan, musician/entertainer
- Malcolm Garrett, graphic designer (album covers for Buzzcocks and Duran Duran)
- David Nolan, author
- Peter Saville, graphic designer (album covers for New Order and Joy Division)
- Martin Baker, former President of the Royal College of Organists and Master of Music at Westminster Cathedral from 2000 to 2019
- Jonah Rzeskiewicz, actor
- Darragh Cowley, actor

=== Business ===
- Sir Andrew Dillon, chief executive

=== Politics ===
- Damian Hinds, Conservative Party Member of Parliament for East Hampshire and former Secretary of State for Education
- Paul Maynard, Conservative Party Member of Parliament for Blackpool North and Cleveleys
- Greg Mulholland, Liberal Democrat Member of Parliament for Leeds North West

=== Science ===
- Sir John Hardy, human geneticist and molecular biologist

=== Religion ===
- Philip Egan, Bishop of Portsmouth and Vicar General of Shrewsbury
