= Chester Gladiators =

English amateur rugby league club

Club information
- Full name: Chester Gladiators RLFC
- Founded: 2008; 18 years ago
- Website: http://www.chestergladiators.com

Current details
- Ground: The Cheshire, Chester
- Competition: Rugby League Conference North West Division

Uniforms
Home colours	Away colours

Chester Gladiators Rugby League Football Club is a rugby league club in Chester, England. They play in the North West Division of the Rugby League Conference, North West Counties and the North West Merit League.

== History ==
=== Previous clubs in Chester ===
Although Chester is less than 45 minutes drive from rugby league strongholds such as Warrington, Widnes, Wigan and St Helens but rugby league has traditionally failed to capture the imagination of locals and the sport struggled to maintain a place in the city's sporting calendar.

The most notable attempt at developing the game in Chester was when Chester Wolves entered the Rugby League Conference in 1998. They were crowned champions the following season, after a Grand Final victory over Crawley Jets. Unfortunately, the club were unable to build on this early success.

In 2005, the Chester Wolves name returned to the Conference after Widnes based club West Bank Bears played under this name. However, this venture failed to capture local interest and the club left the Rugby League Conference for a second time at the end of the 2006 season.

=== Chester Gladiators ===
A new side, Chester Gladiators Rugby League Football Club, was formed in April 2008 by a group of enthusiasts who shared a belief that the sport could prosper in the area.

The club operated an open age side in the RL Merit League; playing a total of seven matches and securing two victories, a 36-28 at North Derbyshire Chargers and a 66-14 victory over the Wolverhampton Warlords. At the end of the debut season they were named RL Merit League Club of the Year and our Chairman Jim Green received the RL Merit League Pioneer of the Year award whilst two players were named in the RL Merit League Dream Team.

The 2009 season saw the launch of a new junior section and a second open age team as the club continued to develop. They won the first Cheshire Challenge Cup final beating Crewe & Nantwich Steamers. Our first team enjoyed a successful season in the RL Merit League, winning ten of their twelve matches and securing a play-off berth for the first time. The newly formed A team also took part in two matches, ensuring that the club was able to provide all of its members with the chance to experience rugby league. The senior sections efforts were rewarded when Alec Read was named as the Kukri RL Merit League Young Player of the Year while the club received an award for their work with the media. At junior level a number of taster days were staged and an under-12s team played five matches, securing two victories.

Chester Gladiators set up a winter side Chester ARLFC to compete in the North West Counties league for 2010-11.

== Club honours ==
- Midlands 9s: 2011
- North West Men’s League Division 4 winners: 2015
- North West Men’s League Shield winners: 2015
- North West Men’s League Division 4 Grand Final winners: 2015

== Previous players ==
- Rob Massam - North Wales Crusaders
- Sam Broadbent - North Wales Crusaders
- Harry Cartwright - South Wales Scorpions
- Andrew Oakden - North Wales Crusaders
- Billy Brickhill - Swinton Lions

== See also ==
- Rugby Football League expansion
