= Dom Speakman =

English rugby league footballer (born 1994)

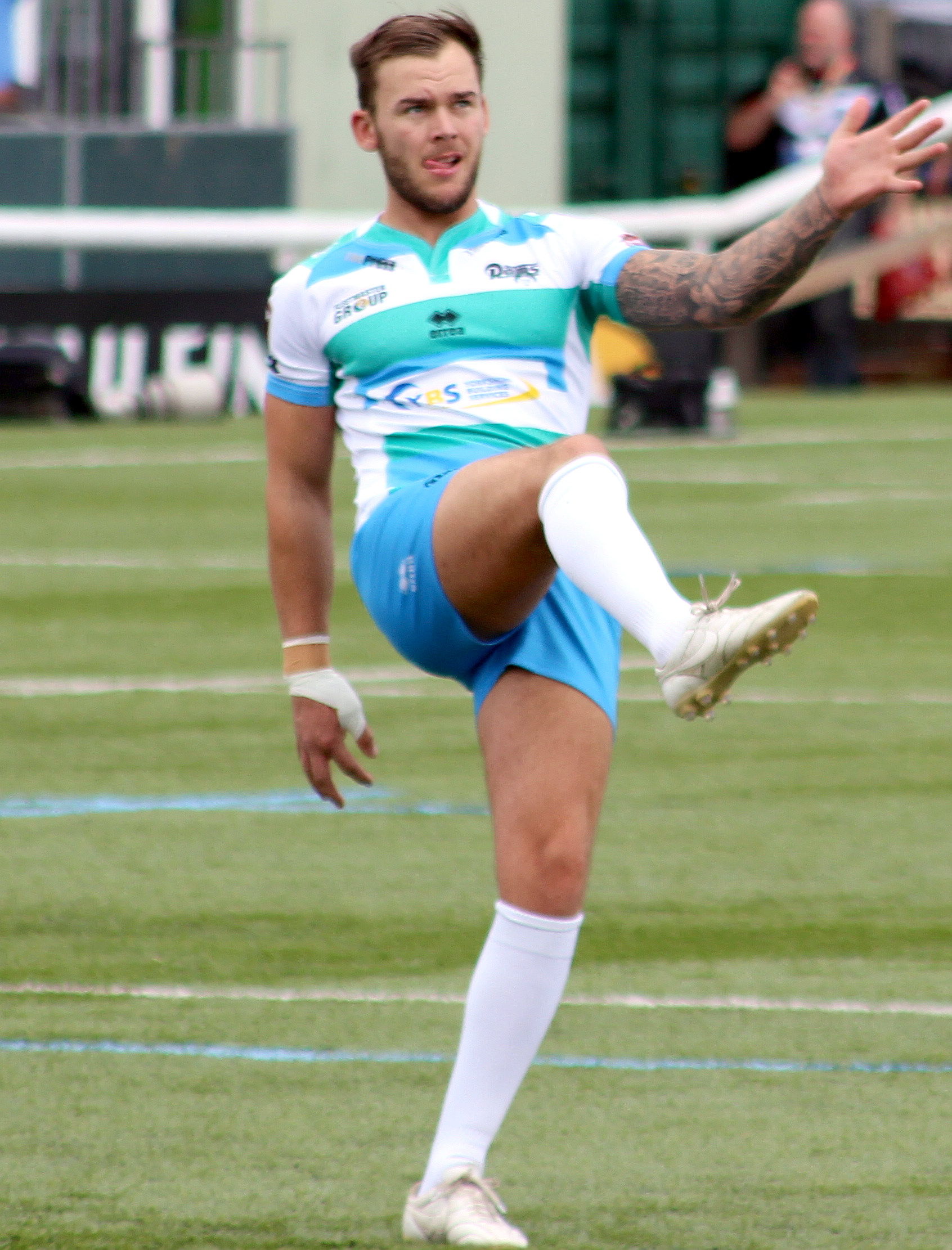

Personal information
- Full name: Dominic Speakman
- Born: 22 March 1994 (age 32)
- Height: 5 ft 10 in (178 cm)
- Weight: 12 st 13 lb (82 kg)

Playing information
- Position: Stand-off, Hooker, Scrum-half
Club
Years	Team	Pld	T	G	FG	P
2013	St Helens	1	0	0	0	0
2013	Rochdale Hornets	7	2	0	0	8
2014	Barrow Raiders	19	1	2	0	8
2014	North Wales Crusaders	4	1	0	0	4
2016–18	Dewsbury Rams	55	9	0	0	36
2019	Widnes Vikings	4	0	0	0	0
2019–22	Dewsbury Rams	38	6	0	0	24
	Total	128	19	2	0	80
- Source: As of 6 May 2026

Dominic Speakman (born 22 March 1994) is a former English professional rugby league player.

He previously played for St Helens in the Super League. Speakman also played for the Rochdale Hornets and the North Wales Crusaders in the third tier, and the Barrow Raiders, Dewsbury Rams and the Widnes Vikings in the Championship.

== Career ==
His début Super League match was for St Helens on his 19th birthday in the game against the Salford.

He signed for Barrow Raiders in November 2013. The former England Academy representative also appeared seven times for the Rochdale Hornets on dual-registration during 2013. In 2014, Speakman made 19 appearances for the Barrow Raiders before a loan move to the North Wales Crusaders. In 2015, Speakman moved to Australia where he played for Tweed Heads Seagulls in the Queensland Cup. On returning to England he joined Dewsbury Rams in 2016. In September 2022, Speakman announced his retirement from rugby league after 6 years.
