= Ciaran Booth =

Irish rugby union player

- Born: 4 May 2000 (age 26) Stockport, England
- Height: 1.88 m (6 ft 2 in)
- Weight: 108 kg (17.0 st; 238 lb)

Rugby union career
- Position: Flanker
Senior career
| Years | Team | Apps | (Points) |
| 2018–2020 | Sale Sharks | 1 | (0) |
| 2018 | → Doncaster Knights (dual registration) | 3 | (0) |
| 2020–2023 | Connacht | 5 | (0) |
| 2023 | Jersey Reds | 0 | (0) |
| 2023– | Caldy RFC | 5 | (5) |
- Correct as of 26 Jan 2024
International career
| Years | Team | Apps | (Points) |
| 2019– | Ireland U20 | 3 | (0) |
- Correct as of 12 June 2020

Ciaran Booth (born 4 May 2000) is an English born, Irish rugby union player, currently playing for Pro14 and European Rugby Champions Cup side Connacht Rugby. He plays in the back row as a flanker. He was educated at St Ambrose College and is the Drummer for The Monday Night Club.

== Professional Rugby ==
Booth was originally in the Sale Sharks academy, making one appearance in the Premiership Rugby Cup. He also represented Doncaster Knights while on a dual registration, featuring in 3 games in the RFU Championship. Booth signed for Connacht in 2020 and went on to sign a senior contract with them in 2022, earning 5 caps in the 2022/2023 season. He made his debut against Bulls (rugby union) in Pretoria. Booth was released by Connacht in 2023 before being signed by RFU Championship team Jersey Reds. After Jersey Reds demise Booth was signed by Caldy RFC.
