= Luke Adamson =

English dual-code rugby footballer

Luke "LA" or "Tarquin" Adamson
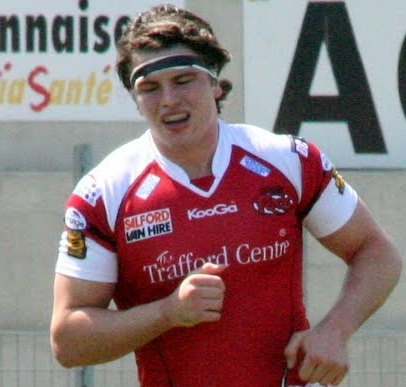

Personal information
- Full name: Luke Adamson
- Born: 17 November 1987 (age 38) Lowton, Greater Manchester, England
- Height: 6 ft 0 in (183 cm)
- Weight: 15 st 4 lb (97 kg)

Playing information

Rugby league
- Position: Prop, Second-row, Loose forward
Club
| Years | Team | Pld | T | G | FG | P |
|---|---|---|---|---|---|---|
| 2006–12 | Salford City Reds | 145 | 20 | 1 | 0 | 80 |
| 2013–14 | Halifax | 47 | 11 | 0 | 0 | 44 |
| 2015–17 | Dewsbury Rams | 58 | 9 | 0 | 0 | 36 |
| 2017 | Oldham | 16 | 2 | 0 | 0 | 8 |
| 2018 | Rochdale Hornets | 25 | 1 | 0 | 0 | 4 |
| 2019 | Leigh Centurions | 22 | 1 | 0 | 0 | 4 |
| | Total | 313 | 44 | 1 | 0 | 176 |

Rugby union
- Position: Centre
Club
| Years | Team | Pld | T | G | FG | P |
|---|---|---|---|---|---|---|
| 2012–13 | Bath | 1 | 0 | 0 | 0 | 0 |
- Source: As of 15 April 2018
- Education: St Ambrose College
- Relatives: Toby Adamson (brother)

Luke Adamson (born 17 November 1987) is an English former rugby league footballer who last played as a prop, second-row or loose forward for the Leigh Centurions in the Championship.

He previously played club level rugby union (RU) for Bath Rugby, and also rugby league (RL) Leigh East ARLFC, the Salford City Reds in the Super League and Halifax, the Dewsbury Rams and Oldham in the Championship.

== Background ==
Adamson was born in Lowton, Greater Manchester, England.

== Career ==
Adamson attended St Ambrose College in Hale Barns where he made his mark in rugby union as a strong running centre. He also represented Cheshire (RU), but his rugby league apprenticeship was served with Leigh East amateur club where he spent three years. He made his début for the Salford City Reds versus Wakefield Trinity Wildcats in 2006. He is also an England academy player, representing England against Australia.

At the end of the 2012 Super League season, Adamson left the Salford City Reds due to the club's financial troubles, and returned to rugby union when he signed for Bath Rugby.

In 2017, Adamson was signed by Oldham.

== Personal life ==
His younger brother Toby Adamson has also played for Dewsbury Rams, and Rochdale Hornet.
