= Midlands 9s =

The Midlands 9s is a rugby league nines event held in the Midlands region and organised by the Midlands Rugby League. It was first held on 20 April 2008 at the home ground of Old Coventrians, Coventry, England. The same venue hosted the 2009 tournament but in 2010 it moved to Mount St Mary's College, Spinkhill.

Competing teams included: Coventry Bears, St Ives Roosters, North Derbyshire Chargers, Heavy Woolen Donkeys and a combined Redditch Ravens/ Wolverhampton Wizards team - Redditch Wizards.

In 2024 The Midlands9s will be back in a new format. Hosted by The Rugby League Outsiders podcast the Midlands9s will be a 9s rugby tournament and music festival. The festival will have a Men's, Women's and Social men's competition. Full info at www.Midlands9s.com

== Past winners ==
=== Cup final ===
- 2008 Coventry Bears 12 St Ives Roosters 6
- 2009 Coventry Bears 20 St Ives Roosters 4
- 2010 North Derbyshire Chargers 14 Leicester Storm 10
- 2011 Chester Gladiators 34 Leicester Storm 12
- 2012 Paget All Stars 14 – 8 Coventry Dragons
- 2013 Coventry Bears

=== Bowl final ===
- 2009 Coventry University 9 Chester Gladiators 4

=== Plate final ===
- 2008 Redditch Wizards 16 North Derbyshire Chargers 6
- 2009 Warwick University 16 Birmingham Bulldogs 8

=== Shield final ===
- 2012 Coventry Warriors 18 – 10 NEW Ravens
