= Andy Thornley =

English professional rugby league & union footballer

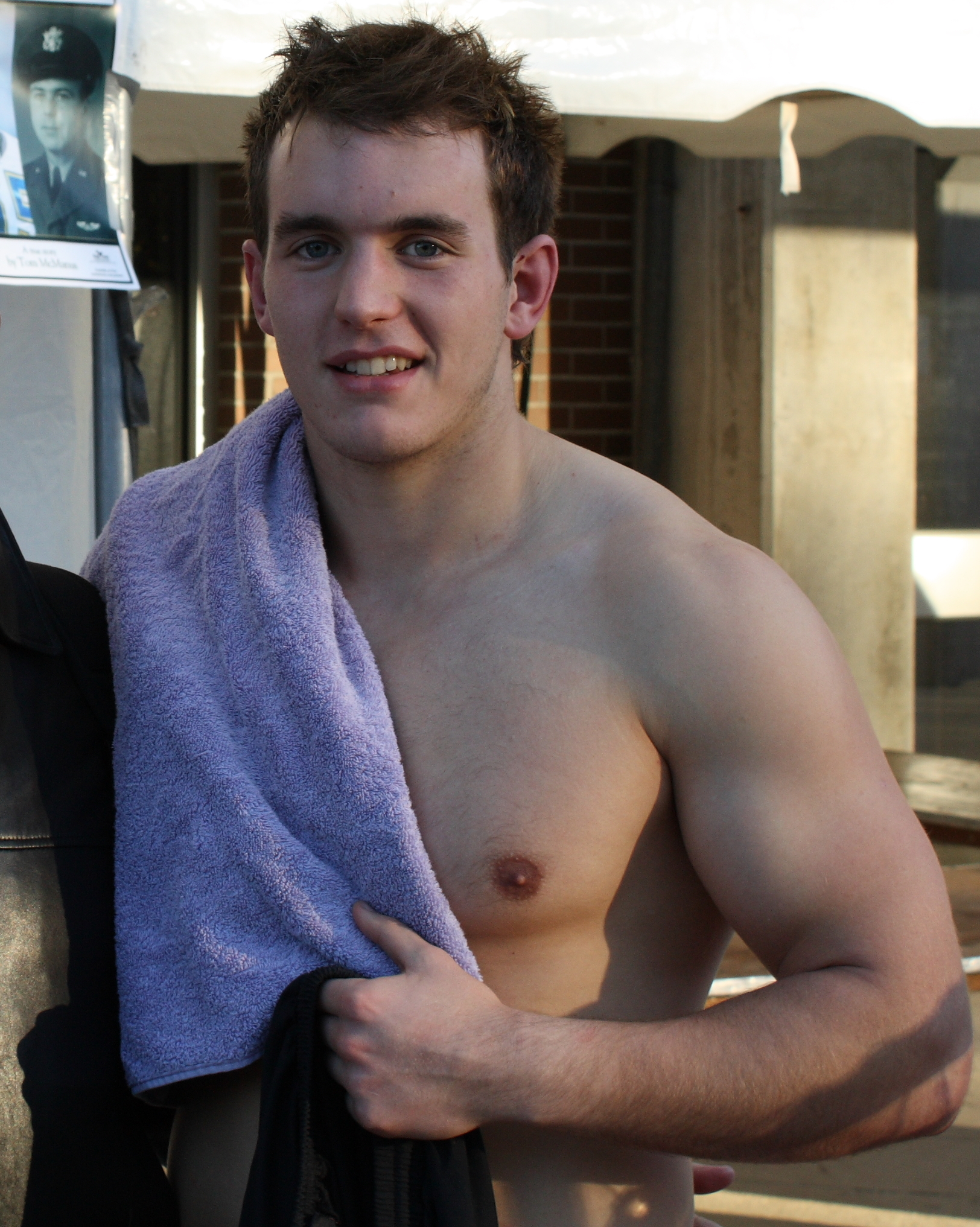

Personal information
- Full name: Andrew Thornley
- Born: 1 March 1989 (age 36)
- Height: 6 ft 3 in (1.91 m)
- Weight: 17 st 11 lb (113 kg)

Playing information

Rugby league
- Position: Second-row, Loose forward, Wing
Club
Years	Team	Pld	T	G	FG	P
2008–09	Wigan Warriors
2009(loan)	→ Salford City Reds	1	1	0	0	4
2009(loan)	→ Whitehaven	5	0	0	0	0
2010–11	Whitehaven	52	6	0	0	24
2011–14	Leigh Centurions	43	7	0	0	28
2014(loan)	→ Swinton Lions	5	0	0	0	0
2014(loan)	→ North Wales Crusaders	2	1	0	0	4
2015–18	Swinton Lions	84	14	0	0	56
2019–20	Leigh Centurions	24	7	0	0	28
2021	Whitehaven R.L.F.C.	8	0	0	0	0
	Total	224	36	0	0	144

Rugby union
Club
Years	Team	Pld	T	G	FG	P
2011	Preston Grasshoppers
- Source: As of 10 June 2025

Andrew Thornley (born 1 March 1989) is an English former professional rugby league footballer who last played as a second-row or loose forward for Whitehaven RLFC in the RFL Championship.

== Rugby League ==
=== Wigan Warriors ===
He was contracted to the Wigan Warriors, and spent time on loan from Wigan at the Salford City Reds in the Super League and Whitehaven in the Championship. He has also played Whitehaven and Leigh in the Championship, spending time on loan from Centurions at the Swinton Lions in the second tier and the North Wales Crusaders in League 1. Thornley has also played for Swinton on a permanent deal in the Championship and the third tier. He played as a winger earlier in his career.

=== Whitehaven R.L.F.C. ===
On 27 Mar 2021 it was reported that he had signed for Whitehaven R.L.F.C. in the RFL Championship

== Rugby Union ==
He has played club level rugby union for Preston Grasshoppers.
