= Alex Thompson (rugby league) =

English rugby league footballer (born 1990)

Personal information
- Full name: Alexander Thompson
- Born: 11 February 1990 (age 36) England

Playing information
- Position: Second-row
Club
Years	Team	Pld	T	G	FG	P
2009–12	Warrington Wolves	1	1	0	0	4
2012	Oldham RLFC	19	11	0	0	44
2013–15	Oxford	29	13	2	0	56
2015–19	North Wales Crusaders	56	21	0	0	84
	Total	105	46	2	0	188

Alex Thompson (born 11 February 1990) is an English former professional rugby league footballer who played for the North Wales Crusaders in League 1. He is by preference a second-row.

He made his first-grade début in Warrington's 44-34 win at home to Harlequins RL in round 27 of 2009's Super League XIV, in which he came off the bench to score a try.

In 2011 Thompson signed a deal with Oldham R.L.F.C. Thompson was a target for Oldham R.L.F.C. for their 2012 team building operation.

In 2012 Thompson signed a deal with Oxford Rugby League, This was part of a string of signings that included 4 other players and also old manager Tony Benson.

In 2015 Thompson left Oxford because of the departure of Tony Benson and joined the North Wales Crusaders.
