= Andrew Dillon (health administrator) =

British executive

Sir Andrew Dillon, CBE FMedSci (born 9 May 1954) is a British executive, who was chief executive of the National Institute for Health and Care Excellence (NICE) from 1999 to 2020. His earlier career was spent as an administrator and manager in the National Health Service (NHS).

== Early life ==
Dillon was born on 9 May 1954 in Sale, Cheshire, England. He was educated at St Ambrose College, an all-boys grammar school in Hale Barns, Cheshire, and at North Cheshire College of Further Education. He studied at the University of Manchester, graduating with a Bachelor of Science (BSc) degree.

== Career ==
Dillon joined the National Health Service (NHS) after graduating from university. He was a general manager of the Royal Free Hospital from 1986 to 1991, and the chief executive of St George's Healthcare NHS Trust from 1991 to 1999.

=== NICE ===
He joined NICE as its founding chief executive in 1999 and retired in 2020.

In September 2013 he wrote an open letter to The Times in which he said companies should be sure that all expenses spent on research were necessary in order to justify the high prices demanded for new products assessed by health technology assessment (HTA) bodies such as NICE: "If it really does cost £1.2bn to develop a new drug, the question the pharmaceutical industry must be able to answer is this: are you absolutely confident that it needs to?".

He was said by the Health Service Journal to be the 34th most powerful person in the English NHS in December 2013. and among The 25 most influential people in biopharma today. As of 2015, Dillon was paid a salary of between £185,000 and £189,999 by NICE, making him one of the 328 most highly paid people in the British public sector at that time.

== Personal life ==
Dillon is married to Alison Goodbrand and they have two daughters.

In 2015, Dillon was elected a Fellow of the Academy of Medical Sciences (FMedSci).
