= Toby Adamson =

English rugby league footballer

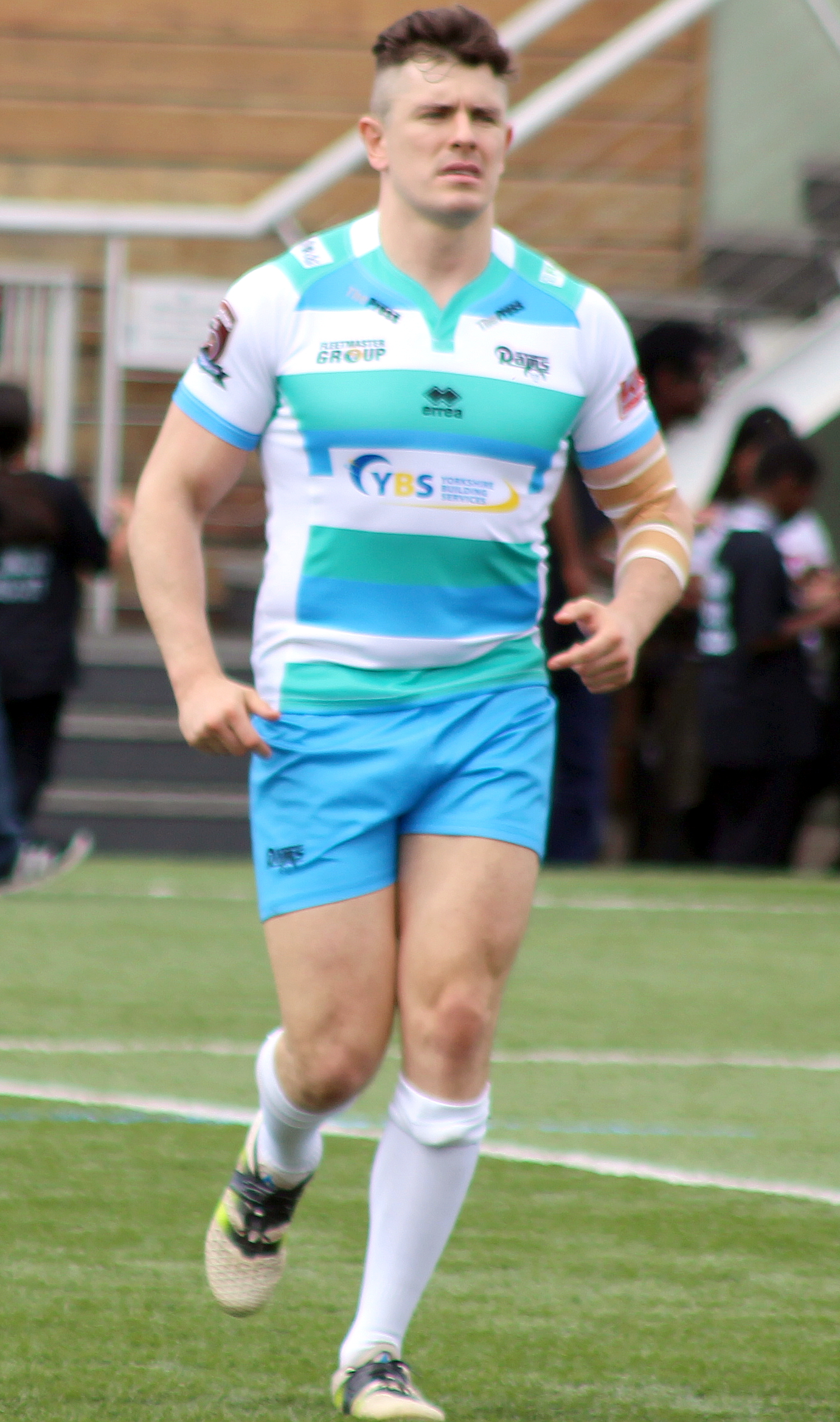

Personal information
- Full name: Tobias Adamson
- Born: 28 May 1990 (age 36) Greater Manchester, England
- Height: 6 ft 1 in (185 cm)
- Weight: 15 st 2 lb (96 kg)

Playing information
- Position: Second-row
Club
Years	Team	Pld	T	G	FG	P
2010–12	Salford City Reds	2	0	0	0	0
2012–14	North Wales Crusaders	48	9	0	0	36
2015–17	Dewsbury Rams	58	9	0	0	36
2018	Rochdale Hornets	24	1	0	0	4
2019	Leigh Centurions	24	5	0	0	20
	Total	156	24	0	0	96
- Source: As of 3 December 2018
- Education: St Ambrose College; University of Liverpool
- Relatives: Luke Adamson (brother)

Tobias Alexander Brian Adamson (born 28 May 1990) is an English professional rugby league footballer who plays as a second-row forward for the Leigh Centurions in the Championship.

He has previously played for Salford City Reds in the Super League, and for the Dewsbury Rams and the North Wales Crusaders.

== Playing career ==
=== Salford ===
Adamson attended St Ambrose College in Hale Barns where he played rugby union as a centre. His earlier rugby league was played for Leigh East amateur club where he spent an illustrious 8-years. Toby made his Salford début against Huddersfield Giants (away) in 2010. Toby is the middle child of 5 boys; his elder brother, Luke, has also played for Salford City Reds.

During a brief sabbatical from the professional ranks, Adamson returned to the University of Liverpool to complete his degree in law. Juggling his studies with the responsibilities of acting as the student mentor at his halls of residence, Toby graduated with 2:1 honours. He has used the skills and knowledge gained from his studies to launch a successful career in business, following his passion for healthy eating by launching 'healthy food' restaurant 'Heaven 'N' Health' alongside his brothers, Luke and Josh.

=== North Wales Crusaders ===
Toby was snapped up by the North Wales Crusaders manager Clive Griffiths when his sabbatical came to an end. He is looking to relish this opportunity and is quoted as saying "Clive Griffiths and John Fieldhouse were good enough to give me an opportunity to get back into the game at a good level so I'm going to take it with both hands and reward them."

After a succession of solid performances during Toby's maiden season at the North Wales Crusaders there was much speculation regarding his future at the club. Such speculation, however, was put to bed when Toby signed on for the 2013 season.
