= Steven Roper =

American political scientist

Steven D. Roper
- Known for: Research on international criminal tribunals, democratization in Eastern Europe and Central Asia
- Title: Professor of Political Science

Academic background
- Education: University of Missouri (Ph.D.)

Academic work
- Institutions: Florida Atlantic University

Steven D. Roper is an American political scientist and professor at Florida Atlantic University (FAU) in Boca Raton, Florida. He is the author of Designing Criminal Tribunals and Romania: The Unfinished Revolution (2000).
