= Aaron McCloskey =

Ireland international rugby league footballer

Personal information
- Full name: Aaron McCloskey
- Born: 20 July 1988 (age 37); Limerick, Ireland
- Height: 200 cm (6 ft 7 in)
- Weight: 120 kg (18 st 13 lb)

Playing information
- Position: Prop
Club
Years	Team	Pld	T	G	FG	P
2011	St Helens	0	0	0	0	`
2012–12	North Wales Crusaders	1	0	0	0	0
	Total	1	0	0	0
Representative
Years	Team	Pld	T	G	FG	P
2011–12	Ireland	3	0	0	0	0
- As of 12 August 2012

Aaron McCloskey (born 20 July 1988), also known by the nickname of "Ivan Drago", is an Irish rugby union and professional rugby league footballer for St. Helens in the Super League, and the Montpellier Red Devils in the Elite One Championship. His position is prop. A former rugby union player with the Garryowen Football Club and Young Munster, and has represented Ireland A-Team at rugby league. He was recruited from Treaty City Titans in Ireland after attending an academy in Limerick.

== Background ==
Aaron McCloskey was born in Limerick, Ireland.
