= Ryan MacDonald (rugby league) =

Scotland international rugby league footballer

Personal information
- Full name: Ryan MacDonald
- Born: 24 February 1978 (age 48) Cumbria, England

Playing information
- Height: 185 cm (6 ft 1 in)
- Weight: 117 kg (18 st 6 lb)
- Position: Prop
Club
Years	Team	Pld	T	G	FG	P
1997	Leeds Rhinos	0	0	0	0	0
1998–99	Bramley	44	3	0	0	12
2000–01	Dewsbury Rams	57	0	0	0	0
2002–04	Widnes Vikings	14	0	0	0	0
2003(loan)	Batley Bulldogs	4	0	0	0	0
2004–06	Halifax	53	3	0	0	12
2007	York City Knights	17	1	1	0	6
2008–10	Whitehaven	42	2	0	0	8
2010–12	Workington Town	51	4	1	0	18
2013–14	North Wales Crusaders	24	2	0	0	8
2014–15	London Skolars	11	1	0	0	0
2015	Newcastle Thunder	4	0	0	0	0
	Total	321	16	2	0	64
Representative
Years	Team	Pld	T	G	FG	P
2001	Scotland	2	0	0	0	0
	Cumbria	3	0	0	0	0

Ryan MacDonald (born 24 February 1978) is an English former rugby league footballer who played in the 1990s, 2000s and 2010s. He played at representative level for Scotland and Cumbria, and at club level for the Leeds Rhinos, Bramley, Dewsbury Rams, Widnes Vikings, Batley Bulldogs, Halifax, York City Knights, Whitehaven, Workington Town, North Wales Crusaders, London Skolars in Championship One and the Newcastle Thunder, as a prop.

== Background ==
Ryan MacDonald was born in Cumbria, England.
