= Gary Middlehurst =

English rugby league footballer

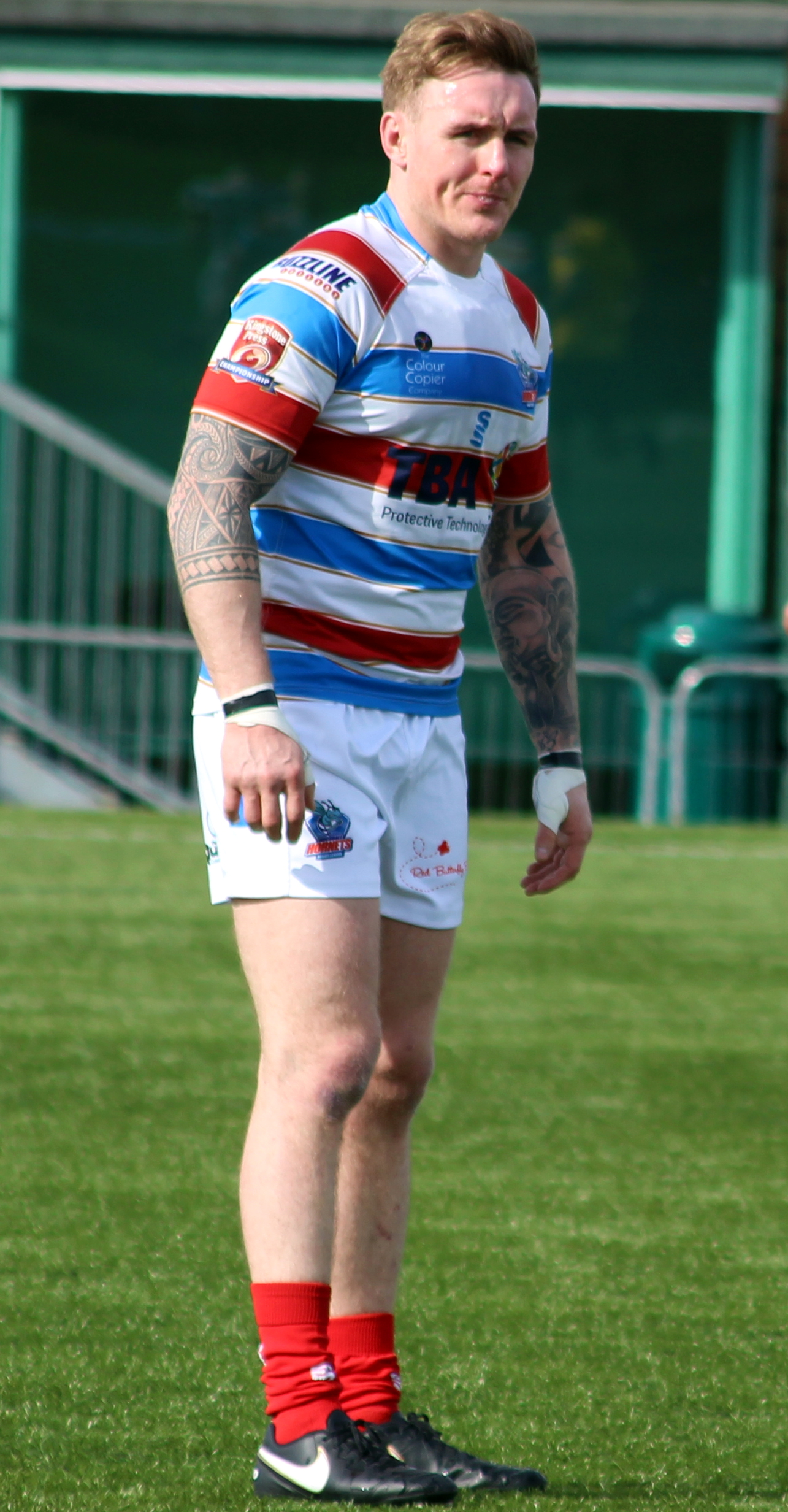

Personal information
- Full name: Gary Middlehurst
- Born: 24 October 1983 (age 41); Widnes, Cheshire, England
- Height: 6 ft 0 in (1.83 m)

Playing information
- Position: Loose forward
Club
Years	Team	Pld	T	G	FG	P
2004	Widnes Vikings	2	0	0	0	0
2011–12	Rochdale Hornets	24	10	0	0	40
2013–15	North Wales Crusaders	62	24	0	1	97
2016	Oldham	24	4	0	0	16
2017–18	Rochdale Hornets	33	6	0	0	24
	Total	145	44	0	1	177
- Source: As of 14 August 2024

Gary Middlehurst (born 24 October 1983) is an English rugby league footballer who last played as a loose forward for the Rochdale Hornets in the Championship.

Middlehurst signed for the North Wales Crusaders from the Rochdale Hornets after starting his career at Widnes. A season-ending injury led to his release by the Crusaders in August 2015, which enabled him to go on a round-the-world trip. Upon his return to the UK in February 2016 he played one season for Oldham RLFC. In October 2016, Middlehurst re-signed with Rochdale.
