= Rhys Griffiths (rugby league) =

Wales international rugby league footballer

Personal information
- Full name: Rhys Griffiths
- Born: 24 July 1987 (age 38) St Helens, Merseyside, England

Playing information
- Position: Centre
Representative
Years	Team	Pld	T	G	FG	P
2008–09	Wales	3	0	0	0	0
- As of 11 May 2021
- Father: Clive Griffiths
- Relatives: Owain Griffiths (brother)

Rhys Griffiths (born 24 July 1987) is a former professional rugby league footballer who played in the 2000s and 2010s. He played at representative level for Wales, and at club level for Leeds Metropolitan University, and the Castleford Tigers (A-Team), as a centre.

He was named in the Wales team to face England at the Keepmoat Stadium prior to England's departure for the 2008 Rugby League World Cup.

He was selected for Wales for the 2009 European Cup and 2010 European Cup.

== Personal life ==
Rhys Griffiths is the son of the rugby union footballer and coach, and rugby league footballer and coach; Clive Griffiths.
