= Owain Griffiths =

Wales international rugby league footballer

Personal information
- Full name: Owain Griffiths
- Born: 18 July 1991 (age 33); St. Helens, England
- Height: 5 ft 9 in (175 cm)
- Weight: 14 st 9 lb (93 kg)

Playing information
- Position: Hooker
Club
| Years | Team | Pld | T | G | FG | P |
|---|---|---|---|---|---|---|
| 2012–14 | North Wales Crusaders | 8 | 0 | 0 | 0 | 0 |
| 2015– | Whitehaven RLFC | 0 | 0 | 0 | 0 | 0 |
| | Total | 8 | 0 | 0 | 0 | 0 |
Representative
| Years | Team | Pld | T | G | FG | P |
| 2014 | Wales | 1 | 0 | 0 | 0 | 0 |
- As of 11 May 2021
- Father: Clive Griffiths
- Relatives: Rhys Griffiths (brother)

Owain Griffiths (born 18 July 1991) is former a Welsh international rugby league player who currently plays for the North Wales Crusaders. His usual positions is Hooker.
Son of Welsh rugby league legend Clive Griffiths, Owain has established himself as an up-and-coming star of the future having played for Wales under 18s and Wales Students. He started his career at local St Helens club Pilkington Recs and was in the academy of Super League club Huddersfield Giants. He has regularly turned out in the successful Leeds Metropolitan University side and starred for them as recently as the 2011–12 season in both BUSA league Super 8 and Challenge Cup.

In October 2014, Owain was called up to the Wales national rugby league team2014 European Cup squad.

== Whitehaven R.L.F.C. ==
On 25 Aug 2015 it was reported that he had signed for Whitehaven R.L.F.C. in the RFL Championship
