= Christiaan Roets =

Wales international rugby league footballer

Personal information
- Born: 5 September 1980 (age 44); Pretoria, South Africa

Playing information
- Height: 183 cm (6 ft 0 in)
- Weight: 94 kg (14 st 11 lb)
- Position: Centre, Second-row
Club
Years	Team	Pld	T	G	FG	P
2010–11	South Wales	41	12	0	0	48
2012–16	North Wales	70	9	0	0	36
2016–17	South Wales	37	12	0	0	48
	Total	148	33	0	0	132
Representative
Years	Team	Pld	T	G	FG	P
2009–17	Wales	24	13	0	0	52

Christiaan Roets (born 5 September 1980) is a former semi-professional rugby league footballer who represented the Welsh national team, most notably at the 2011 Four Nations, 2013 World Cup, and 2017 World Cup. He primarily played as a centre for the South Wales Scorpions and the North Wales Crusaders.

== Background ==
Roets was born in South Africa.

== Playing career ==
Roets played for the Swansea Valley Miners and the Bridgend Blue Bulls in the Wales amateur competition. In 2009, he played two matches for the Crusaders RL in the Super League reserve grade.

After two seasons with the South Wales Scorpions, Roets joined the North Wales Crusaders in 2012. He returned to the Scorpions early in the 2016 season.

=== Representative career ===
Roets made his international début for Wales against Serbia at the 2009 European Cup, scoring three tries in a man of the match performance. He also featured in the European Cup Championship Final against Scotland scoring one try. Roets scored a try for Wales in their game against England in the 2012 Tri-Nations.

Roets played for Wales in the 2013 Rugby League World Cup. Roets was the top scorer for the Welsh, scoring four tries in the tournament.

In October 2014, Roets played in the 2014 European Cup. He scored a try in the opening game against Scotland.

In October 2015, Roets played in the 2015 European Cup tournament.

In October 2016, Roets played in the 2017 World Cup qualifiers.

Roets also represented Wales Students (scoring five tries in twelve matches) and Wales Amateurs (scoring four tries in nine matches) during his career.

== Post-playing career ==
On 3 March 2022, Roets was announced as team manager of the Wales men's national team ahead of the 2021 World Cup.
