= Jamie Durbin =

English rugby league footballer

Personal information
- Full name: James Durbin
- Born: 7 September 1984 (age 40); Widnes, England

Playing information
- Position: Scrum-half
Club
| Years | Team | Pld | T | G | FG | P |
|---|---|---|---|---|---|---|
| 2003–04 | Warrington Wolves | 3 | 1 | | | 4 |
| 2005 (loan) | → Widnes Vikings |
| 2005 (loan) | → Rochdale Hornets |
| 2006 | Doncaster Lakers | 1 |
| 2006 | Widnes Vikings | 9 |
| 2009–10 | Leigh Centurions | 25 | 13 | 0 | 0 | 52 |
| 2012–15 | North Wales Crusaders | 13 | 3 | 0 | 0 | 12 |
| | Total | 51 | 17 | 0 | 0 | 68 |
- Source: As of 2 September 2012

Jamie Durbin (born 7 September 1984) is an English former rugby union and rugby league footballer who played in the 2000s and 2010s. He played representative level rugby union (RU) for England (Schoolboys), and club level rugby league (RL) for the Halton Farnworth Hornets ARLFC, the Warrington Wolves, the Widnes Vikings (two spells, including one on loan), Rochdale Hornets (loan), the Doncaster Lakers, Halton Simms Cross ARLFC, the Leigh Centurions, and the North Wales Crusaders, as a scrum-half.

He has played both codes of rugby and was an England schoolboys international in rugby union whilst on a junior contract with the Warrington Wolves after starting his rugby league career with Halton Farnworth Hornets. The Widnes born youngster then made his Warrington Wolves début against the Widnes Vikings in a pre-season friendly ahead of a 2003's Super League VIII which also brought him his Super League début, later that year he was the final try scorer for the Warrington Wolves in their last official game at Wilderspool Stadium, a tour match against New Zealand 'A'. He then played for Widnes Vikings, Rochdale Hornets, Doncaster and Halton Simms Cross before signing for Leigh in 2009 where he was top try scorer in his inaugural season there. Jamie was signed from Leigh Centurions at the start of 2012.

Jamie Durbin made his début for the Warrington Wolves on Sunday 3 August 2003, and he played his last match for the Warrington Wolves on Sunday 14 March 2004
