= Iwan Brown =

Wales international rugby league footballer

Personal information
- Full name: Iwan Brown
- Born: 3 March 1986 (age 39); Wrexham, Wales
- Height: 193 cm (6 ft 4 in)
- Weight: 96 kg (15 st 2 lb)

Playing information
- Position: Second-row
Club
Years	Team	Pld	T	G	FG	P
2012–12	North Wales Crusaders	12	1	0	0	4
Representative
Years	Team	Pld	T	G	FG	P
2012–12	Wales	1	0	0	0	0
- As of 5 July 2012

Iwan Brown (born 3 March 1986) is a Welsh rugby league footballer who currently plays for the North Wales Crusaders. His usual positions is a Second-row. He has represented Wales and Great Britain Students at Rugby League. He was in the Lions side that made history by being the first side to seal a Test and Academic Ashes Series win on Australian soil. He is also one of the unique few non-English (even non-Northern English) player to be picked for a BARLA representative side, playing for the Great Britain BARLA under 21s in 2007. Brown was called up to the Wales Rugby League squad for their game against France in June 2011 and made his début in that game.
