= Dave McConnell =

Former Scotland international rugby league footballer

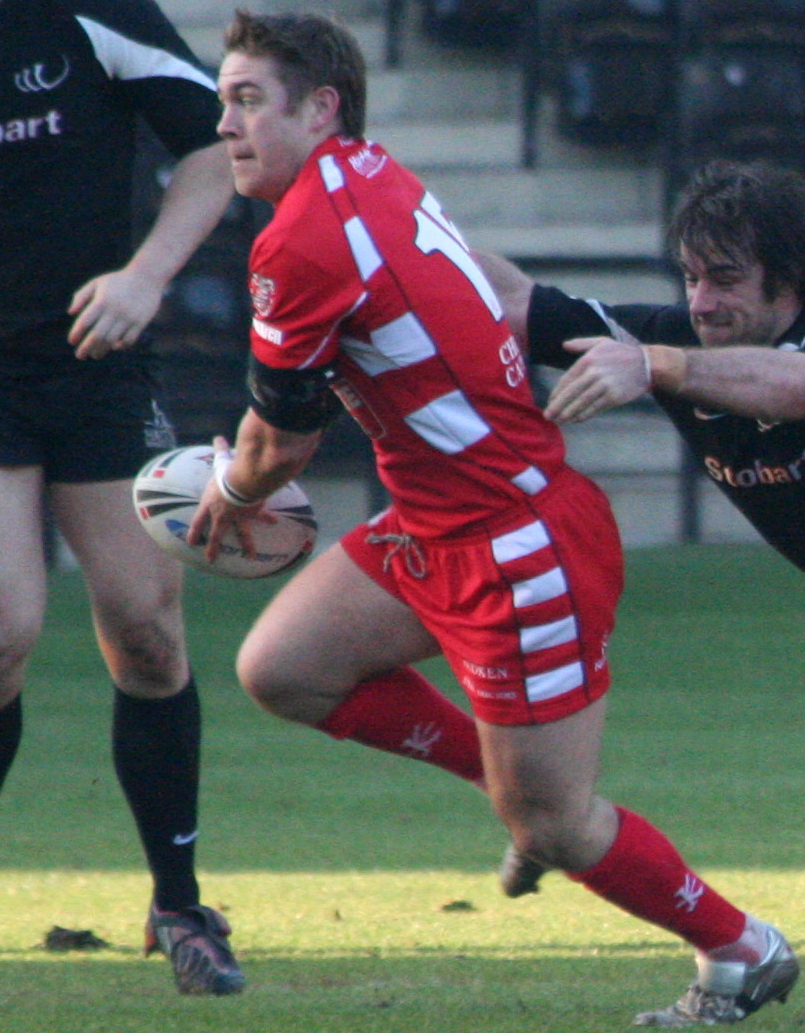

Personal information
- Born: Dave McConnell; 25 March 1981 (age 45) England

Playing information
- Position: hooker
Club
| Years | Team | Pld | T | G | FG | P |
|---|---|---|---|---|---|---|
| 2001–02 | St Helens | 6 | 4 | 0 | 0 | 16 |
| 2003–03 | Chorley Lynx | 26 | | | | 37 |
| 2003–03 | London Broncos | 4 | 0 | 0 | 0 | 0 |
| 2004–04 | Leigh Centurions | 27 | 4 | 0 | 0 | 16 |
| 2005–07 | Rochdale Hornets | 67 | | | | 93 |
| 2008–10 | Leigh Centurions | 8 | 1 | 0 | 0 | 4 |
| 2012 | Swinton Lions |
| 2013 | North Wales Crusaders | 5 | 2 | 0 | 0 | 8 |
| | Total | 143 | 11 | 0 | 0 | 174 |
Representative
| Years | Team | Pld | T | G | FG | P |
| 2008 | Scotland | 9 | 2 | 0 | 0 | 8 |

Dave McConnell (born 25 March 1981) is a former Scotland international rugby league footballer who played for St Helens and the London Broncos in the Super League. He has also played for Chorley Lynx, Leigh Centurions and the Rochdale Hornets.

McConnell's position of choice was as a hooker, but he played as a stand-off, scrum-half, second-row or loose forward.

He was named in the Scotland training squad for the 2008 Rugby League World Cup.

He was named in the Scotland squad for the 2008 Rugby League World Cup.
