= Andy Gorski =

English rugby league footballer

Personal information
- Born: 31 March 1981 (age 45) England

Playing information
- Position: Loose forward
Club
Years	Team	Pld	T	G	FG	P
2001–03	Salford City Reds	6
2003	Swinton Lions	4	1			4
2004–07	Rochdale Hornets	98	31			148
2008	Halifax	7	1			4
2008–10	Whitehaven	43	7			28
2011	Leigh Centurions	4	2			12
2011–12	Swinton Lions	13	5			24
2012(loan)	→North Wales Crusaders	10	5	0	0	20
2013	North Wales Crusaders	14	3	0	0	16
	Total	199	55	0	0	256
- Source: As of 25 January 2025

Andy Gorski is an English former professional rugby league footballer. He played in the second-row. He last played for the North Wales Crusaders. He had previously played for Salford City Reds in the Super League, along with spells with Halifax, the Rochdale Hornets and the Leigh Centurions.
