= Ian Cross (rugby league) =

Ireland international rugby league & union footballer

Personal information
- Full name: Ian Cross
- Born: 15 September 1989 (age 36) Limerick, Ireland
- Height: 190 cm (6 ft 3 in)
- Weight: 89 kg (14 st 0 lb)

Playing information

Rugby league
- Position: Centre, Stand-off, Scrum-half
Club
Years	Team	Pld	T	G	FG	P
2012	North Wales Crusaders	7	1	5	0	14
Representative
Years	Team	Pld	T	G	FG	P
2011–12	Ireland	3	0	0	0	0

Rugby union
Club
Years	Team	Pld	T	G	FG	P
	London Irish RFC
	Esher RFC
	Total	0	0	0	0	0
- Source: As of 9 August 2012

Ian Cross (born 15 September 1989) is an Irish rugby league and rugby union footballer who plays for London Irish. His position is centre or in the halves.

== Background ==
Cross was born in Limerick, Ireland.

== Career ==
A former player with the UL Bohemians R.F.C. and Young Munster, and has represented both Ireland A and the Ireland Senior team at rugby league. Having represented Munster at all underage levels, he signed for St Helens rugby league in the Super League after impressing on a trial. He was loaned out to Montpellier and also the Crusaders during his time at St Helens. Ian then signed for London Irish in the Premiership before going on to play for both Esher (National One) and London Welsh (Championship). He was recruited from Treaty City Titans in Ireland attending an academy in Limerick.
