= Adam Clay =

English rugby league footballer

Personal information
- Full name: Adam Clay
- Born: 7 October 1990 (age 36) Leigh, Greater Manchester, England

Playing information
- Position: Wing
Club
Years	Team	Pld	T	G	FG	P
2011	Salford City Reds	4	5	0	0	20
2012	Leigh Centurions	4	3	0	0	12
2012(loan)	→ North Wales Crusaders	10	6	0	0	24
2013	Barrow Raiders	27	12	0	0	48
2014	North Wales Crusaders	10	2	0	0	8
2014–20	Oldham	90	39	0	0	156
	Total	145	67	0	0	268
- Source: As of 29 December 2017

Adam Clay (born 7 October 1990) is an English professional rugby league footballer. He has played at club level for Leigh Miners Rangers ARLFC, Salford City Reds, Leigh in the 2012 Co-Operative Championship, the North Wales Crusaders (two spells, including an initial loan in 2012), Barrow Raiders and Oldham, as a wing.

Clay played his junior rugby for Leigh Miners Rangers ARLFC before joining the academy at Salford. Clay was named as Salford's Senior Academy player of the season in 2010 and 2011 saw him make his first team début, scoring five tries in four appearances, including a double on his senior début against Harlequins RL.
