= Rob Massam =

Wales international rugby league footballer

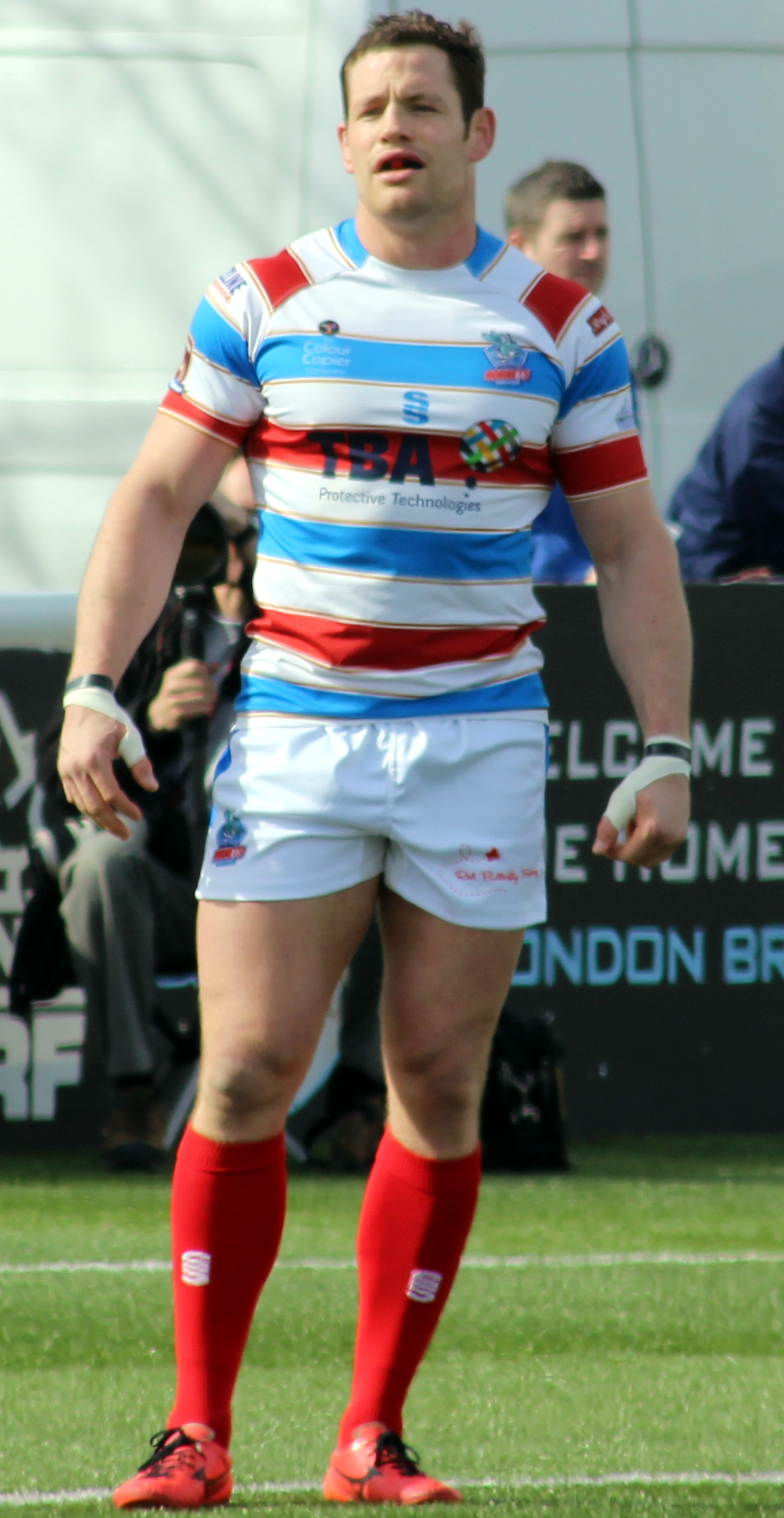

Personal information
- Full name: Robert Massam
- Born: 29 October 1987 (age 38) Salisbury, Wiltshire, England
- Height: 185 cm (6 ft 1 in)
- Weight: 101 kg (15 st 13 lb)

Playing information
- Position: Wing, Centre
Club
Years	Team	Pld	T	G	FG	P
2012–16	North Wales Crusaders	112	98	0	0	392
2017–18	Rochdale Hornets	83	33	0	0	132
2019–	North Wales Crusaders	85	85	0	0	340
	Total	280	216	0	0	864
Representative
Years	Team	Pld	T	G	FG	P
2009–13	Wales	2	1	0	0	4
- Source: As of 30 October 2024

Rob Massam (born 29 October 1987) AKA The Tank on the flank, is a ex Wales international rugby league footballer who played as a winger for the North Wales Crusaders in League 1.

He has previously played for the Rochdale Hornets. He was a key player for Chester Gladiators, and was selected to represent England Lionhearts in 2010 scoring the winning try in England's 34–30 win over Wales Dragonhearts in Somerset. He scored against Wales Dragonhearts again in 2011 in Caerphilly but was unable to stop the Welsh from winning 30-24 and lifting the trophy.

== Representative ==
Massam qualifies for Wales through residency as he moved to Wrexham at a young age. Despite representing England at amateur level Massam was selected for the Wales 'train-on' squad for the Tri-Nations against England and France in 2012. He made his full début in that game.

In October and November 2013, Massam played in the 2013 Rugby League World Cup where he scored a try.

In October 2014, Massam was selected to play in the 2014 European Cup but he withdrew before the tournament due to work commitments.

== Honours ==
Massam was included in August's Cooperative Championship 1 Team of the Month, after becoming Crusaders leading try scorer for the 2012 season.

== Personal life ==
Massam works as a personal trainer and is a qualified Biomechanics coach at Total Fitness in Wrexham and he has sponsored local rugby league club Wrexham Raiders for the 2012 season.
