= Jamie Clark (rugby league) =

Former Lebanon international rugby league footballer

Personal information
- Born: 19 March 1987 (age 38) Sydney, New South Wales, Australia
- Height: 176 cm (5 ft 9 in)
- Weight: 92 kg (14 st 7 lb)

Playing information
- Position: Hooker
Representative
Years	Team	Pld	T	G	FG	P
2007–17	Lebanon	19	5	1	0	22

Jamie Clark is a Lebanon international rugby league footballer.

== Background ==
Clark was born in Australia.

== Playing career ==
Clark is a Canterbury-Bankstown Bulldogs junior and has played for Lebanon since 2007, including in the 2009 European Cup. He was named in the Lebanese squad for the 2017 Rugby League World Cup.
