= Clive Griffiths (rugby) =

Welsh dual-code rugby footballer and coach (born 1954)

Personal information
- Full name: Clive Ronald Griffiths
- Born: 2 April 1954 (age 72) Loughor, Swansea, Wales

Playing information

Rugby union
- Position: Full-back
Club
Years	Team	Pld	T	G	FG	P
1971–79	Llanelli RFC	181	78	45	1	422
Representative
Years	Team	Pld	T	G	FG	P
1979	Wales	1				0
	Barbarian F.C.

Rugby league
- Position: Fullback, Wing, Centre
Club
Years	Team	Pld	T	G	FG	P
1979–84	St. Helens	100	11	277	8	600
1984–86	Salford	42	20	151	6	388
	Total	142	31	428	14	988
Representative
Years	Team	Pld	T	G	FG	P
1980–81	Wales	2	0	0	0	0

Coaching information

Rugby union
Club
Years	Team	Gms	W	D	L	W%
2006–07	Doncaster Knights
2007–09	Worcester Warriors
2012–2022	Doncaster Knights
	Total	0	0	0	0

Rugby league
Club
Years	Team	Gms	W	D	L	W%
1996–97	South Wales	22	12	0	10	55
2011–14	North Wales Crusaders
	Total	22	12	0	10	55
Representative
Years	Team	Gms	W	D	L	W%
1991–00	Wales	25	15	0	10	60
1996	Great Britain
- Source: As of 11 October 2023
- Relatives: Rhys Griffiths (son); Owain Griffiths (son)

Clive Ronald Griffiths (born 2 April 1954), also known by the nickname of "Griff", is a Welsh former dual-code international rugby union and professional rugby league footballer who played in the 1970s and 1980s, and coached rugby union and rugby league in the 1990s, 2000s and 2010s. He played representative level rugby union (RU) for Wales, at invitational level for the Barbarian F.C., and at club level for Llanelli RFC, as a full-back, and representative level rugby league (RL) for Wales, and at club level for St. Helens and Salford, as a fullback, wing or centre, and coached representative level rugby union (RU) for Wales (Defence Coach), and at club level for Penclawdd RFC, Newcastle Emlyn RFC, London Welsh RFC (assistant coach), Swansea RFC (assistant coach), Newport Gwent Dragons (assistant coach), Doncaster Knights (two spells), Worcester Warriors and RGC 1404 (in Colwyn Bay), and representative level rugby league (RL) for Wales, and at club level for the South Wales and the North Wales Crusaders, and as of 2018 he is the Director of Rugby at the Doncaster Knights.

== Background ==
Clive Griffiths was born in Loughor, Swansea, he was affectionately known as "Clive the Ship" after the family pub in nearby Penclawdd, he was a pupil at Gowerton Grammar School, he is the father of the rugby league International footballers Rhys and Owain Griffiths.

== International rugby union career ==
He represented the Barbarians and on the international scene he was capped once against England in his last match for Wales on 17 March 1979. After winning his Wales B cap he was selected on the bench three times previously during the 1979 Five Nations but was an unused replacement.

== Rugby league club career ==
On 16 August 1979 he switched codes signing for St. Helens rugby league club for a world record £27,000 (based on increases in average earnings, this would be approximately £183,200 in 2015), and making his début in the 28–16 defeat by Widnes in the first round of the 1979 Lancashire Cup at Knowsley Road, Eccleston, St Helens on Sunday 19 August 1979. In exactly 100 appearances he scored 598 points from 276 goals, 8 drop goals and 11 tries. After playing his last match for the club against Hull Kingston Rovers On 9 October 1984 he joined Salford. He also coached at St.Helens and Warrington before returning to Rugby Union.

== Rugby league coaching career ==
In September 1986, he returned to St. Helens to take up the position of fitness conditioner and a move into coaching the Wales national rugby league team led to some very creditable performances under his guidance including a World Cup semi-final match against the eventual winners Australia with a first half performance that gave Wales a half time lead. He spent 10 years with the Welsh rugby league team, twice guiding them to the semi-final stage of the World Cup and winning the European Championship for the first time in 57 years. He also enjoyed a spell as Great Britain rugby league coach in 1996. Clive was Head coach of Wales Students from 2024-2026 and is now Wales Rugby League Performance Director

== Rugby union coaching career ==
Whilst playing for Llanelli Griffiths took up his first senior coaching appointment in 1977 at the age of 25 for Newcastle Emlyn RFC. His first professional coaching role in union was with London Welsh for three seasons before joining Swansea as assistant coach in 2000. He later joined Mike Ruddock at the Newport Gwent Dragons again as assistant coach. Griffiths was appointed to the Wales Squad Coaching team on 1 July 2001 by Graham Henry and remained a part of the set up through the 2003 Rugby World Cup and five Six Nations campaigns, including the 2005 RBS Six Nations Grand Slam where he was credited for his part in tightening Wales' defensive line, particularly in their tackling performance against England.

In May 2006 he joined the then National One side Doncaster as director of rugby on a two-year deal, leading them to third place in National Division One.

Clive Griffiths joined Worcester Warriors as Head Coach and assistant to Director of Rugby Mike Ruddock in June 2007 on an initial two-year deal.

He went on to coach RGC 1404 North Wales rugby club who are being fast tracked into the Welsh Premiership.

== Return to rugby league coaching ==
In November 2011 Griffiths signed a 2-year deal to coach North Wales Crusaders, the rugby league side risen from the ashes of the former Super League franchise Crusaders. North Wales play in the Cooperative Championships 1 division.

After a winning eight out of 18 games, including three doubles, and just two more victories would have put in them in the end of season play-off competition. The following year The Crusaders won the double and were crowned champions and won the Northern Rail Cup and Griffiths was awarded Championship 1 Coach of the Year.
