= North Wales Crusaders =

Welsh rugby league club, based in Colwyn Bay

Club information
- Full name: North Wales Crusaders Rugby League Football Club
- Short name: Crusaders
- Colours: Red and white
- Founded: 2011; 15 years ago
- Website: https://www.northwalesrugby.com/

Current details
- Ground: Eirias Stadium (6,080)
- CEO: Ben Evans
- Chairman: Jamie Elkaleh
- Coach: Stuart Simmons
- 2026 season: 20th
- Current season

Uniforms
Home colours	Away colours

Records
- Northern Rail Bowl: 1 (2013)
- Championship 1: 1 (2013)
- Most capped: 204 – Tommy Johnson
- Highest points scorer: 1500 – Tommy Johnson

The North Wales Crusaders (Welsh: Croesgadwyr Gogledd Cymru Rygbi'r Gynghrair) are a professional rugby league club based in Colwyn Bay, Wales. The club is the successors to the former Super League club Crusaders Rugby League. They currently compete in the RFL Championship.

Until the end of 2016 they played their home games at the Racecourse Ground in Wrexham. From 2017 to 2020 they were based at the Queensway Stadium in Wrexham, but also played several games at Hare Lane in Chester. In 2021 the club moved to the Eirias Stadium in Colwyn Bay.

== History ==
=== Background ===
Rugby league club Celtic Crusaders were formed in 2005. They were initially based at Brewery Field in Bridgend and successfully applied to join National League Two for the 2006 season. In their first season they reached the semi-final of the play-offs only to lose 27–26 to Swinton Lions in golden point extra time. The following season they finished top of the league to secure automatic promotion to National League One. In the 2008 season, they reached the Grand Final, which they lost 38–18 to Salford City Reds, however both sides were promoted to the Super League under the newly-introduced licence system. In November 2009, the club changed its name to Crusaders Rugby League. After two season in the top division the club were struggling financially and they entered administration in November 2010. In July 2011, the club withdrew its application to renew their Super League licence and its membership of the RFL was withdrawn following the club entering into liquidation.

=== North Wales Crusaders ===
==== 2011 ====
On 11 October 2011, Crusaders RL was readmitted into the RFL for the 2012 season beginning in Championship 1, the third tier of rugby league in the United Kingdom, under the name "North Wales Crusaders". Their original name being preserved following a fan inquest. The club held open trials in the off-season to attract new players.

North Wales Crusaders won their first game, a friendly, 34–12 away to Leigh East.

North Wales won the 2013 Championship One title, thus gaining promotion to the Championship after beating South Wales Ironmen 35–22 on the final day of the season. However, they were relegated the following season.

==== 2016 ====
In 2016, financial issues resulted in the club making cuts to their playing budget. The club was significantly supported in this period by Wales Rugby League in the form of loans and helping with the club's management structure.

==== 2017 ====
Ahead of the 2017 season, the club appointed a new captain in Lee Hudson, and signed Mike Grady as a new head coach.

==== 2024 ====
On 20 December 2024, the club was taken over by EggChaserRugby, and saw Bobby Watkins become a non-executive chairman. This also saw Arun Watkins become the club's majority shareholder and thus the youngest ever club owner in RFL history at 23 years old.

==== 2025 ====
The 2025 season saw North Wales win League 1 for the first time in 12 years gaining promotion to the Championship. The club also one of 12 teams to send expressions of interest for one of the additional two spots in the expanded Super League going into 2026, being the only League 1 club to do so. However they did not continue with a formal application.

Dean Muir, formerly coach at Hunslet RLFC, was appointed as head coach on 13 October 2025.

==== 2026 ====
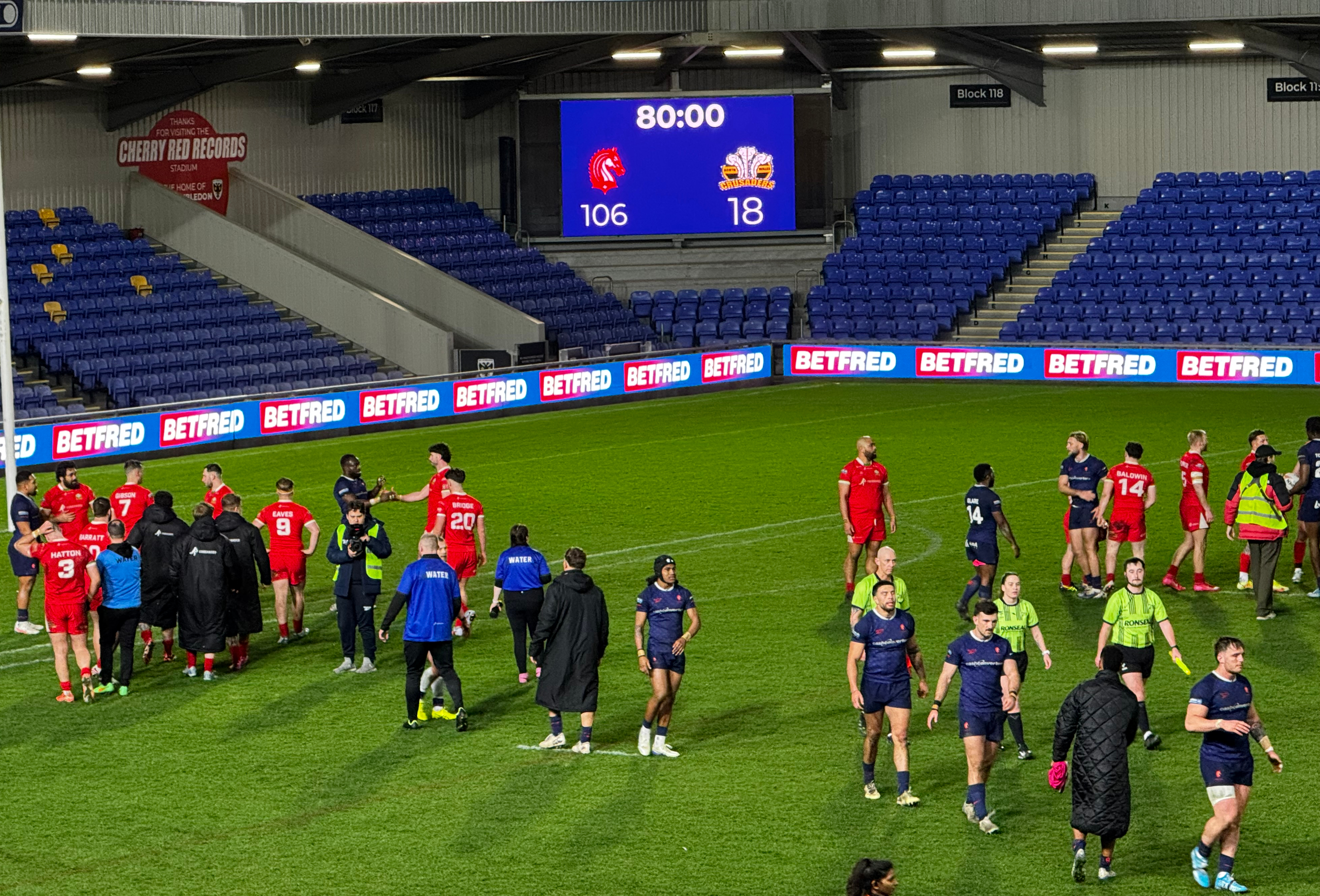
The North Wales Crusaders post match against the London Broncos in 2026 after conceding the most points in their history

Muir left the club on 24 March 2026.

On 26 March 2026, Krisnan Inu was appointed head-coach following Dean Muir's departure

On 9 April 2026, the owners withdrew further funding of the club. The 1895 Cup game against Midlands Hurricanes on 18 April was forfeited and the Championship match against Doncaster was postponed on 27 April after many players left the club. On 6 May, the RFL terminated the Crusaders' membership due to an insolvency event. The following day, the RFL announced that it had approved membership of a new ownership group for the remainder of the 2026 season. The club also received a 12-point deduction.

Inu left the club in May and was replaced by Sean Long who had previously managed the club's womens team. On 8 June 2026, North Wales suffered the biggest defeat by any team in the top two divisions of Rugby League in the codes 131-year history as they were defeated 134-0 by London.

On 20 July 2026 Mike Grady quit after just 50 days.

At the end of the 2026 season, the RFL refused to give the club a place in the 2027 Championship, but following discussion with the club owners, the decision was reversed on 30 October 2026.

== Club identity and colours ==
The club revealed a logo ready for use in the 2012 season which was an evolution of the 2011 logo. The badge, inspired by the Prince of Wales's feathers, has three white feathers adorning the centre of a disc with the Flag of St. David on. To the left and right of the feathers, the words "North" and "Wales" appear on the disc as opposed to "Rugby" and "League" on the old logo. Beneath the feathers remains the text "Crusaders".

In 2012, the club launched a kit with black shirts covered with a multi-coloured cheveron. Since then the club has changed its colours numerous times mainly between black and yellow, or red, white and green kits. Shirt designs have also incorporated elements connected to their Welsh heritage such as a Welsh Dragon in 2019, an image of Conwy Castle on their 2022 away kit, and a dragon scale pattern on their 2026 kits.

== Stadiums ==
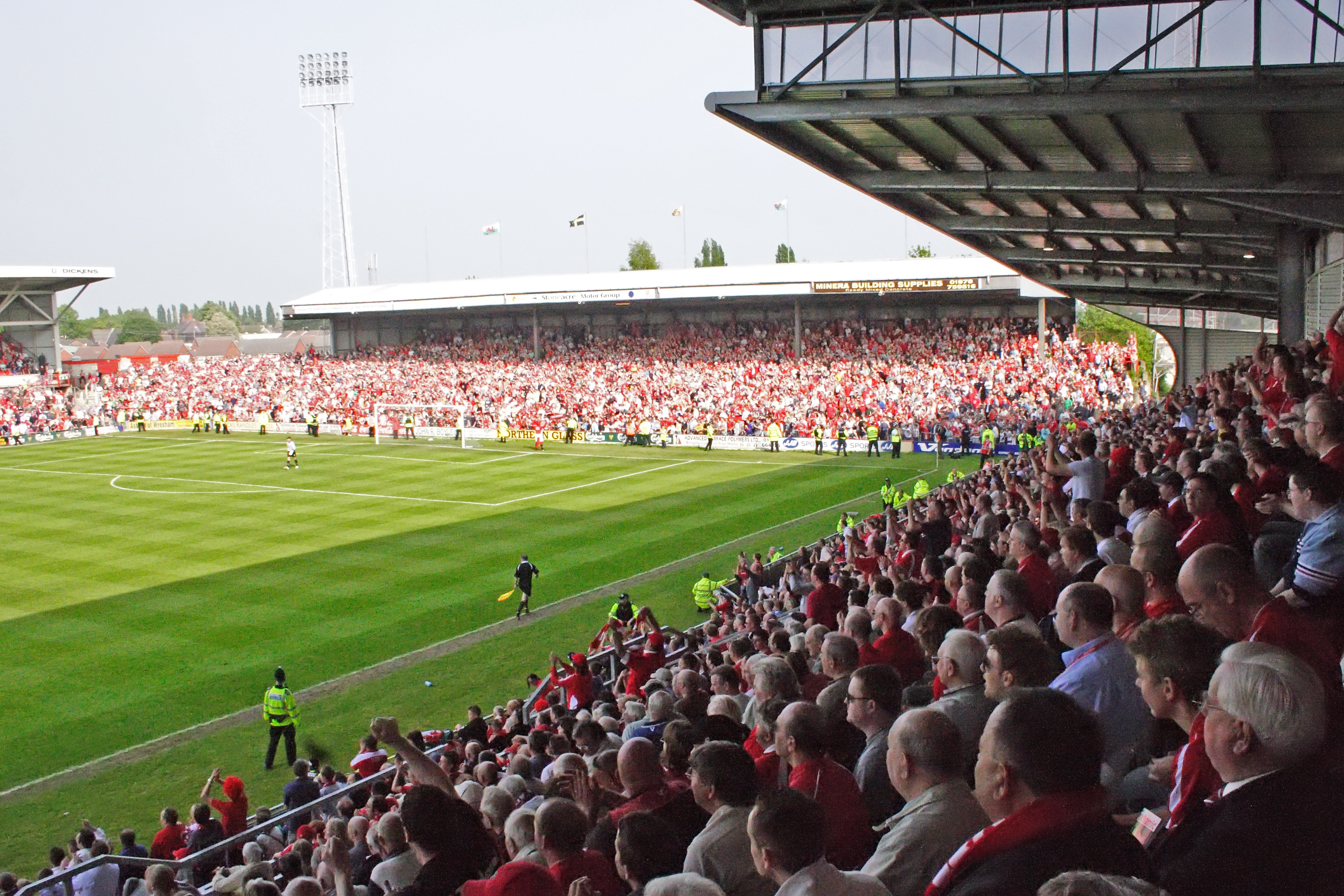
Racecourse Ground stadium, Wrexham

North Wales Crusaders were first based at the Racecourse Ground located in Wrexham. The Crusaders Rugby League club had moved to the ground in 2010, in time for the start of the Super League XV season. The first Crusaders match ever played there was against Leeds Rhinos on 29 January 2010, and that match is also the highest attendance for a Crusaders match played in Wrexham. With a capacity of 15,500 it is the largest ground in North Wales, the fifth largest in the whole of Wales, and the seventh largest in Super League. It was first built in 1807 and first played host to Wrexham's "Town Purse" horse race. Crowd trouble stopped the horse racing and in 1864 it became home to Wrexham Football Club with the club now owning the ground. The Wales national rugby league team have played there. The ground has four stands: The Mold Road Stand, the Eric Roberts Stand, the Kop and the Yale.

During pre-season of the 2012 campaign. North Wales Crusaders played 'Home' games at both Halton Stadium (Widnes) and Eirias Stadium (Colwyn Bay).

Whilst resurfacing work was taking place at the Racecourse Ground in 2014, North Wales Crusaders took their home games to 'the Rock' in Rhosymedre, near Ruabon.

For the 2017 season, the club was based at the Queensway Stadium in Wrexham. It consists of two small all-seater stands on one side overlooking a rugby pitch and a running track with floodlights.

In 2021, the club was based at Stadiwm ZipWorld (aka Eirias Stadium) in Colwyn Bay due to COVID-19 restrictions preventing the use of Queensway Stadium.

== 2027 squad ==
2027 North Wales Crusaders squad
First team squad	Coaching staff
(England) Jamie Billsborough – HK; (England) Harry Coleman – PR; (England) Paddy Jones – PR, LF	Head coach: (England) Stuart Simmons; Assistant coach: (England) Matt Reid; Legend: (c) Captain(s); (vc) Vice-captain(s); Updated: 14 November 2026; Source(s): https://nwcrusadersrl.com/team/

== Coaches ==
- Clive Griffiths: November 2011 – June 2014
- Anthony Murray: June 2014 – September 2016
- Mike Grady: October 2016 – March 2018
- Anthony Murray: March 2018 – 2022
- Carl Forster: November 2022 – 4 October 2025
- Dean Muir: October 2025 – March 2026
- Krisnan Inu: March 2026 – 2026
- Sean Long: May 2026 – June 2026
- Mike Grady: June 2026 – July 2026

== Honours ==
- League 1:
  Winners (2): 2013, 2025
- League 1 Cup:
  Winners (1): 2015
  Runners-up (1): 2017
- Championship Bowl:
  Winners (1): 2013

== See also ==
- Rugby Football League expansion
