= 2013 Rugby League World Cup Group C =

2013 Rugby League World Cup Group C is one of the four groups in the 2013 Rugby League World Cup. The group comprises Scotland, Tonga, and Italy.

== Ladder ==
Team	Pld	W	D	L	TF	PF	PA	+/−	Pts
Scotland	3	2	1	0	13	78	62	+16	5
Tonga	3	2	0	1	12	62	42	+20	4
Italy	3	1	1	1	11	62	62	0	3

All times are local – UTC+0/GMT

== Tonga vs Scotland ==
29 October 2013
20:00

Tonga	24–26	Scotland
Try: Fisiiahi 9' m S. Manu (2) 41' c, 56 m Seluini 49' m W. Manu 61' c Goal: Langi (2/5) 43', 62'	Report	Try: Russell (2) 13' c, 72 c Fisher 32' c Carter 38' c Goal: Brough (5/6) 14', 20', 32', 39', 72'

Derwent Park, Workington
Attendance: 7,630
Referee: Shayne Hayne (Australia)
Player of the Match: Sika Manu (Tonga)

FB	1	Glen Fisiiahi
RW	2	Daniel Tupou
RC	3	Konrad Hurrell
LC	4	Jorge Taufua
LW	5	Sosaia Feki
SO	6	Samisoni Langi
SH	7	Daniel Foster
PR	8	Brent Kite (c)
HK	9	Siliva Havili
PR	10	Fuifui Moimoi
SR	11	Jason Taumalolo
SR	12	Sika Manu
LF	13	Willie Manu
Substitutes
IC	14	Nafe Seluini
IC	15	Ben Murdoch-Masila
IC	16	Ukuma Ta'ai
IC	17	Mickey Paea
Coach:
Charlie Tonga

FB	1	Matty Russell
RW	2	Alex Hurst
RC	3	Ben Hellewell
LC	4	Kane Linnett
LW	5	Brett Carter
SO	6	Danny Brough (c)
SH	7	Peter Wallace
PR	8	Adam Walker
HK	9	Ian Henderson
PR	10	Luke Douglas
SR	11	Danny Addy
SR	12	Dale Ferguson
LF	13	Oliver Wilkes
Substitutes
IC	14	Ben Fisher
IC	15	Brett Phillips
IC	16	Mitch Stringer
IC	17	Ben Kavanagh
Coach:
(England) Steve McCormack

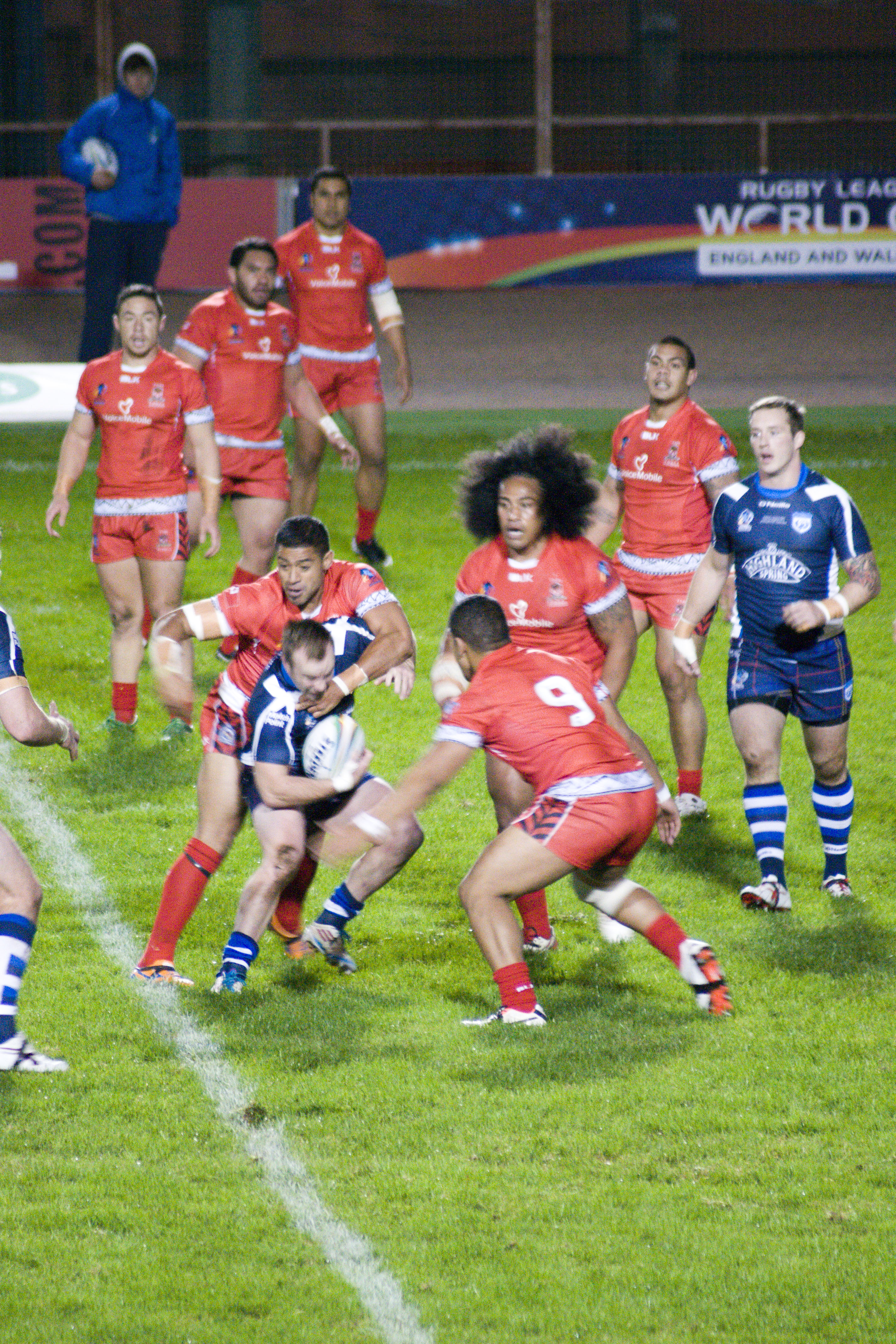

Touch Judges:
Warren Turley (England)
Matt Thomason (England)
Video Referee:
Ashley Klein (Australia)

== Scotland vs Italy ==
3 November 2013
16:00

Scotland	30–30	Italy
Try: Russell 20' c Linnett 25' c Addy 41' c Hellewell (2) 49' c, 69' m Goal: Brough (5/6) 14', 21', 25', 41', 49'	Report	Try: Ciraldo 31' c Nasso (2) 37' c, 45' c Centrone 52' c A. Minichiello 58' c Goal: Mantellato (5/5) 31', 37', 45', 53', 58'

Derwent Park, Workington
Attendance: 7,280
Referee: Henry Perenara (New Zealand)
Player of the Match: Ray Nasso (Italy)

FB	1	Matty Russell
RW	2	Alex Hurst
RC	3	Ben Hellewell
LC	4	Kane Linnett
LW	5	Brett Carter
SO	6	Danny Brough (c)
SH	7	Peter Wallace
PR	8	Adam Walker
HK	9	Ian Henderson
PR	10	Luke Douglas
SR	11	Danny Addy
SR	12	Dale Ferguson
LF	13	Ben Kavanagh
Substitutes
IC	14	Ben Fisher
IC	15	Brett Phillips
IC	16	Mitch Stringer
IC	17	Oliver Wilkes
Coach:
(England) Steve McCormack

FB	1	Anthony Minichiello (c)
RW	2	Josh Mantellato
RC	3	James Tedesco
LC	4	Aidan Guerra
LW	5	Chris Centrone
SO	6	Ben Falcone
SH	7	Ryan Ghietti
PR	8	Anthony Laffranchi
HK	9	Dean Parata
PR	10	Paul Vaughan
SR	11	Mark Minichiello
SR	12	Cameron Ciraldo
LF	13	Joel Riethmuller
Substitutes
IC	14	Kade Snowden
IC	15	Ryan Tramonte
IC	16	Brenden Santi
IC	17	Ray Nasso
Coach:
(Italy) Carlo Napolitano

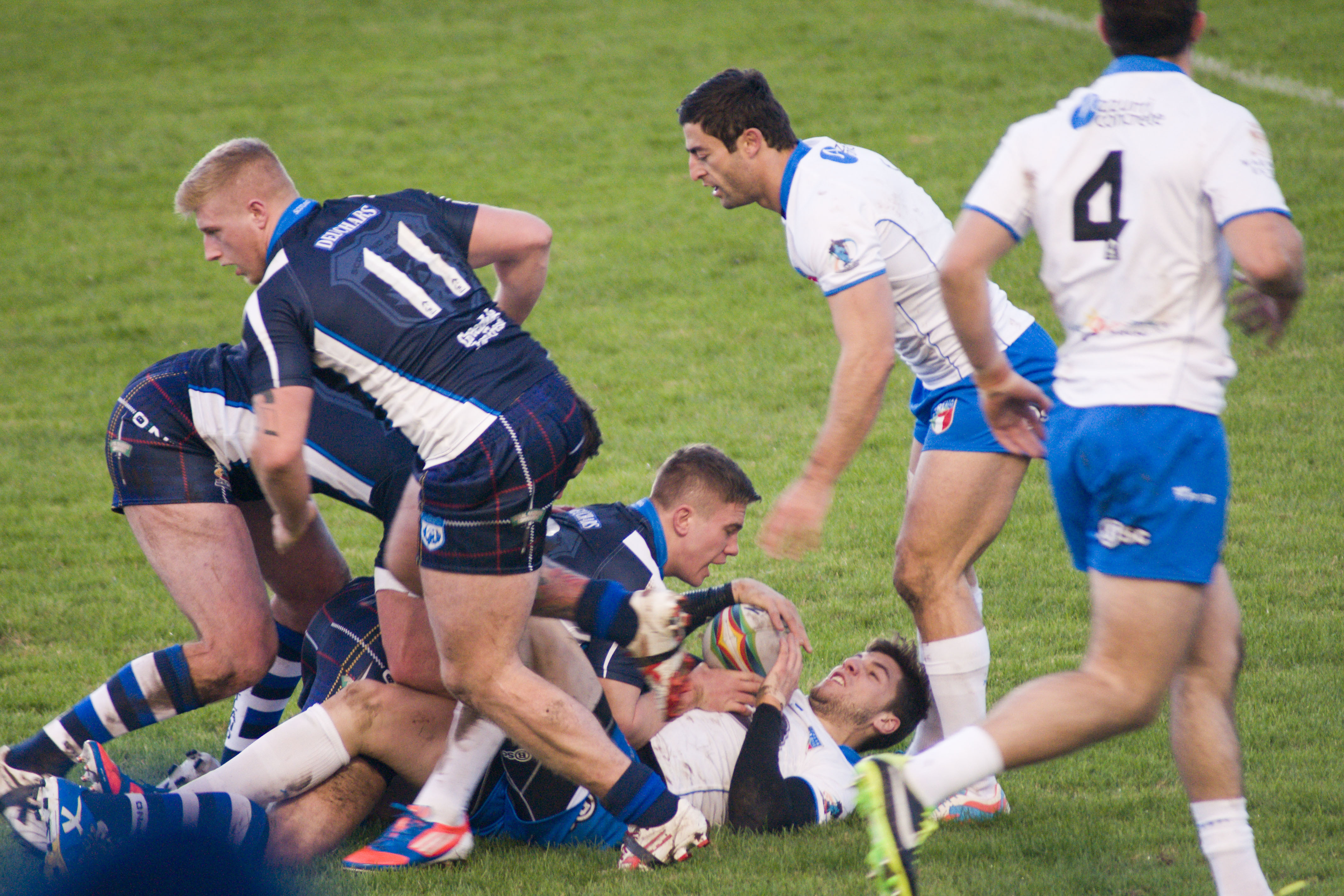

Touch Judges:
Mark Craven (England)
Tony Martin (England)
Video Referee:
Thierry Alibert (France)

== Tonga vs Italy ==
10 November 2013
16:00

Tonga	16–0	Italy
Try: Manu 47' c Foster 64' m Terepo 79' m Goal: Langi (2/3) 40', 48'	Report

The Shay, Halifax
Attendance: 10,266
Referee: Ben Thaler (England)
Player of the Match: Fuifui Moimoi (Tonga)

FB	1	Nesiasi Mataitonga
RW	2	Daniel Tupou
RC	3	Konrad Hurrell
LC	4	Mahe Fonua
LW	5	Jorge Taufua
SO	6	Samisoni Langi
SH	7	Daniel Foster
PR	8	Brent Kite (c)
HK	9	Pat Politoni
PR	10	Fuifui Moimoi
SR	11	Ukuma Ta'ai
SR	12	Willie Manu
LF	13	Mickey Paea
Substitutes
IC	14	Nafe Seluini
IC	15	Siosaia Vave
IC	16	Peni Terepo
IC	17	Siuatonga Likiliki
Coach:
Charlie Tonga

FB	1	Anthony Minichiello (c)
RW	2	Josh Mantellato
RC	3	James Tedesco
LC	4	Aidan Guerra
LW	5	Chris Centrone
SO	6	Ben Falcone
SH	7	Ryan Ghietti
PR	8	Anthony Laffranchi
HK	9	Dean Parata
PR	10	Paul Vaughan
SR	11	Mark Minichiello
SR	12	Cameron Ciraldo
LF	13	Joel Riethmuller
Substitutes
IC	14	Kade Snowden
IC	15	Ryan Tramonte
IC	16	Brenden Santi
IC	17	Ray Nasso
Coach:
(Italy) Carlo Napolitano

Touch Judges:
Clint Sharrad (England)
Tim Roby (England)
Video Referee:
Phil Bentham (England)

== Wales vs Italy (Inter-group) ==
26 October 2013
16:30

Wales	16–32	Italy
Try: B. Evans 15' c Lloyd 38' c Kear 43' m Goal: White (2/3) 15', 38'	Report	Try: Guerra (2) 9' c, 21' c Mantellato 47' m Tedesco 69' m Centrone 71' m M. Minichiello 80' c Goal: Mantellato (4/7) 9', 22', 28', 80'

Millennium Stadium, Cardiff
Attendance: 45,052
Referee: Ashley Klein (Australia)
Player of the Match: Josh Mantellato (Italy)

FB	1	Rhys Evans
RW	2	Elliot Kear
RC	3	Rhodri Lloyd
LC	4	Ian Webster
LW	5	Rhys Williams
SO	6	Lloyd White
SH	7	Matt Seamark
PR	8	Craig Kopczak (c)
HK	9	Neil Budworth
PR	10	Ben Flower
SR	11	Ben Evans
SR	12	Tyson Frizell
LF	13	Larne Patrick
Substitutions:
IC	14	Gil Dudson
IC	15	Peter Lupton
IC	16	Jordan James
IC	17	Jacob Emmitt
Coach:
(Wales) Iestyn Harris

FB	1	Anthony Minichiello (c)
RW	2	Josh Mantellato
RC	3	James Tedesco
LC	4	Aidan Guerra
LW	5	Chris Centrone
SO	6	Ben Falcone
SH	7	Ryan Ghietti
PR	8	Anthony Laffranchi
HK	9	Dean Parata
PR	10	Paul Vaughan
SR	11	Mark Minichiello
SR	12	Cameron Ciraldo
LF	13	Joel Riethmuller
Substitutions:
IC	14	Sam Gardel
IC	15	Ryan Tramonte
IC	16	Brenden Santi
IC	17	Ray Nasso
Coach:
(Italy) Carlo Napolitano

Touch Judges:
Jamal Thompson (New Zealand)
Jose Pereira (France)
Video Referee:
Shayne Hayne (Australia)

Note: The match between Wales and Italy was an additional inter-group match.

== Tonga vs Cook Islands (Inter-group) ==
5 November 2013
20:00

Tonga	22–16	Cook Islands
Try: Fisiiahi 7' c Taumalolo 31' c Hurrell 39' m Taufua 62' m Goal: Langi (3/5) 7, 31', 37'	Report	Try: Taripo (3) 12' c, 19' m, 43' c Goal: Taripo (2/2) 12', 43'; Rapana (0/1)

Leigh Sports Village, Leigh
Attendance: 10,554
Referee: Ashley Klein (Australia)
Player of the Match: Chris Taripo (Cook Islands)

FB	1	Glen Fisiiahi
RW	2	Daniel Tupou
RC	3	Konrad Hurrell
LC	4	Mahe Fonua
LW	5	Jorge Taufua
SO	6	Samisoni Langi
SH	7	Daniel Foster
PR	8	Brent Kite (c)
HK	9	Pat Politoni
PR	10	Fuifui Moimoi
SR	11	Jason Taumalolo
SR	12	Sika Manu
LF	13	Mickey Paea
Substitutes
IC	14	Nafe Seluini
IC	15	Siosaia Vave
IC	16	Willie Manu
IC	17	Ukuma Ta'ai
Coach:
Charlie Tonga

FB	1	Drury Low
RW	2	Chris Taripo
RC	3	Brad Takairangi
LC	4	Keith Lulia
LW	5	Jordan Rapana
SO	6	Johnathon Ford
SH	7	Isaac John
PR	8	Dylan Napa
HK	9	Daniel Fepuleai
PR	10	Zane Tetevano
SR	11	Dominique Peyroux
SR	12	Zeb Taia (c)
LF	13	Tinirau Arona
Substitutes
IC	14	Hikule'o Malu
IC	15	Adam Tangata
IC	16	Joe Matapuku
IC	17	Sam Mataora
Coach:
(Australia) David Fairleigh

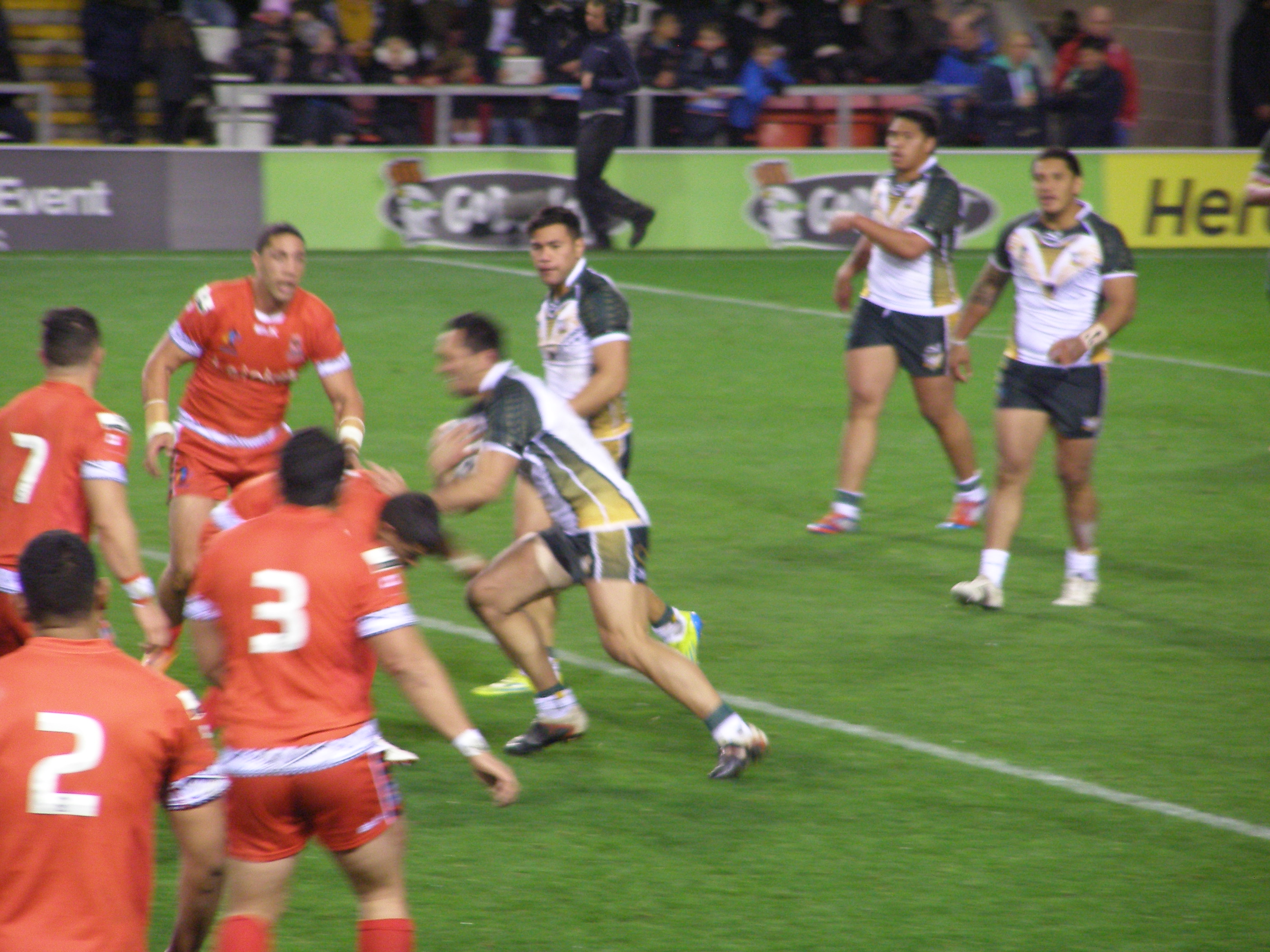

Touch Judges:
Warren Turley (England)
Matt Thomason (England)
Video Referee:
Richard Silverwood (England)

Note: The match between Tonga and Cook Islands is an additional inter-group match.

== Scotland vs United States (Inter-group) ==
7 November 2013
20:00

Scotland	22–8	United States
Try: Phillips 51' m Russell 55' c Douglas 63' c Hurst 80' c Goal: Brough (3/4) 55', 63', 80'	Report	Try: Freed 8' m Welch 23' m Goal: Paulo (0/2)

Salford City Stadium, Salford
Attendance: 6,041
Referee: Thierry Alibert (France)
Player of the Match: Matty Russell (Scotland)

FB	1	Matty Russell
RW	2	Alex Hurst
RC	3	Ben Hellewell
LC	4	Danny Addy
LW	5	David Scott
SO	6	Danny Brough
SH	7	Peter Wallace
PR	8	Adam Walker
HK	9	Andrew Henderson
PR	10	Luke Douglas
SR	11	Brett Phillips
SR	12	Dale Ferguson
LF	13	Ben Kavanagh
Substitutes
IC	14	Sam Barlow
IC	15	Alex Szostak
IC	16	Mitch Stringer
IC	17	Oliver Wilkes
Coach:
(England) Steve McCormack

FB	1	Kristian Freed
RW	2	Bureta Faraimo
RC	3	Taylor Welch
LC	4	Michael Garvey
LW	5	Matt Petersen
SO	6	Joseph Paulo
SH	7	Craig Priestly
PR	8	Mark Offerdahl
HK	9	Tui Samoa
PR	10	Eddy Pettybourne
SR	11	Clint Newton
SR	12	Matt Shipway
LF	13	Daniel Howard
Substitutes
IC	14	David Marando
IC	15	Roman Hifo
IC	16	Joel Luani
IC	17	Judah Lavulo
Coach:
(Australia) Terry Matterson

Touch Judges:
James Child (England)
Tim Roby (England)
Video Referee:
Henry Perenara (New Zealand)

Note: The match between Scotland and United States is an additional inter-group match.
