= Brett Carter =

Brett Carter may refer to:

- Brett Carter (politician), American politician
- Brett Carter (rugby league), British rugby league footballer
