= Ryan Tramonte =

Italy international rugby league player (born 1982)

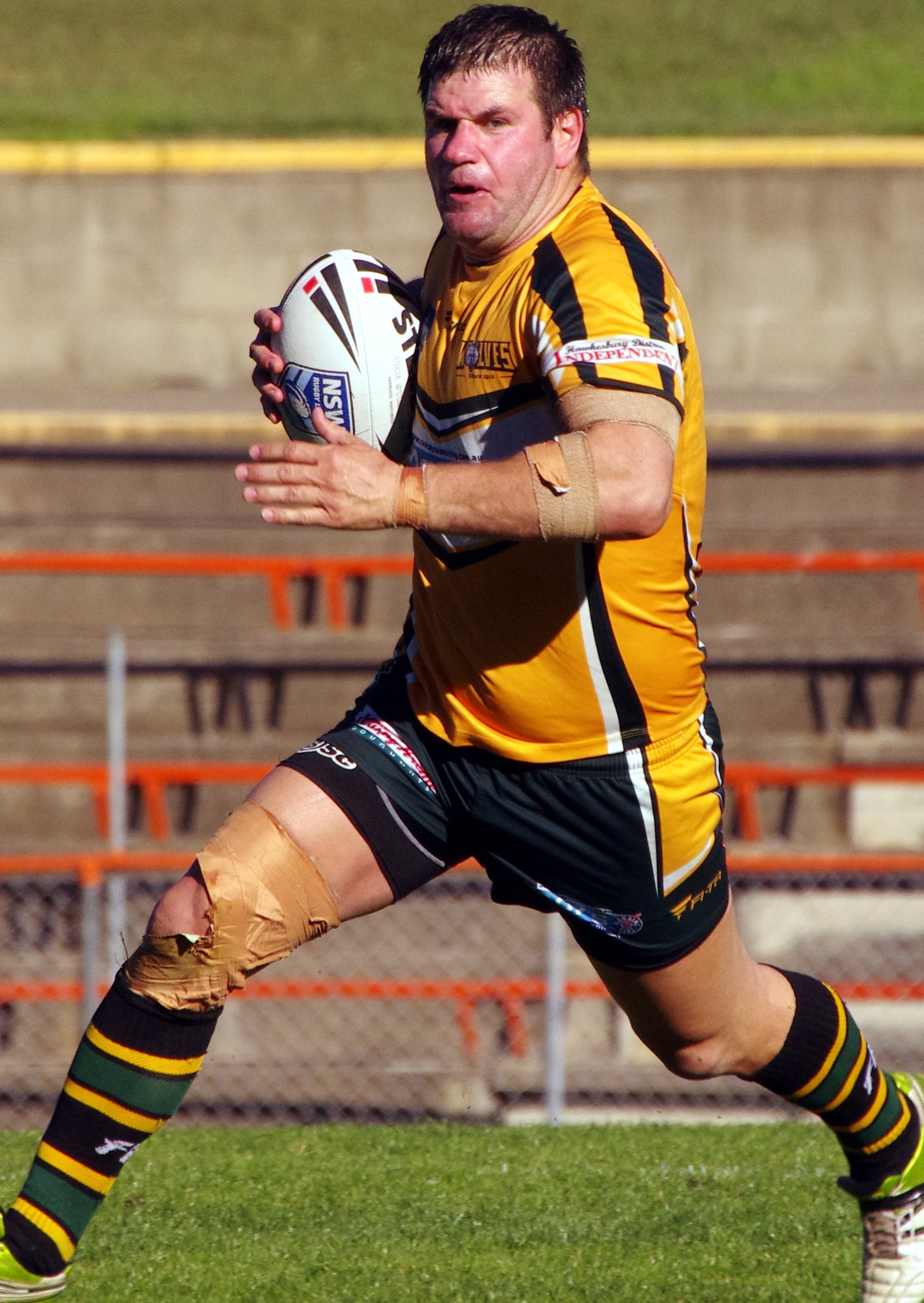
- Tramonte playing for Windsor in 2014

Personal information
- Born: 12 March 1982 (age 44) Sydney, New South Wales, Australia

Playing information
- Position: Second-row
Representative
Years	Team	Pld	T	G	FG	P
2009–13	Italy	8	0	0	0	0

Ryan Tramonte (born 12 March 1982) is a former Australian-Italian rugby league footballer who represented Italy in the 2013 World Cup.

== Playing career ==
He played for the Windsor Wolves in the NSW Cup as a second rower.
