= Ben Hellewell =

Scotland international rugby league footballer

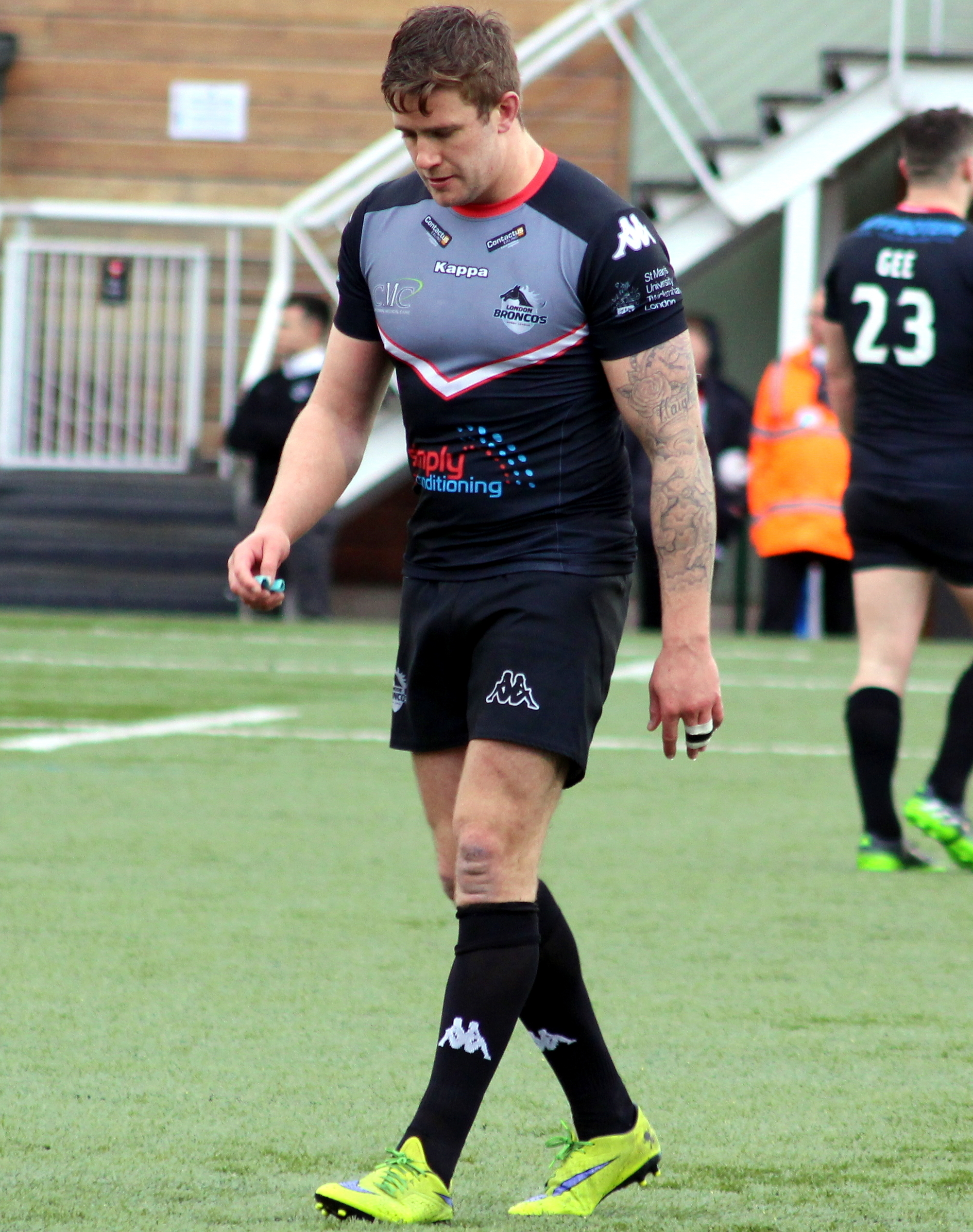

Personal information
- Full name: Benjamin Hellewell
- Born: 30 January 1992 (age 34) Bradford, West Yorkshire, England

Playing information
- Height: 6 ft 1 in (1.85 m)
- Weight: 14 st 13 lb (95 kg)
- Position: Second-row, Centre, Fullback, Wing
Club
Years	Team	Pld	T	G	FG	P
2011–12	Warrington Wolves
2012(loan)	→ York City Knights	7	1	0	0	4
2012(loan)	→ Barrow Raiders	6	3	0	0	12
2013–14	Featherstone Rovers	18	8	0	0	32
2014(loan)	→ Dewsbury Rams	10	4	0	0	16
2015–19	London Broncos	109	47	0	0	188
2019(DR)	→ Sheffield Eagles	13	7	0	0	28
2020–21	Leigh Leopards	29	9	0	0	36
2022	Featherstone Rovers	24	8	0	0	32
2022(loan)	→ Salford Red Devils	2	0	0	0	0
2023–25	Salford Red Devils	17	4	0	0	16
	Total	235	91	0	0	364
Representative
Years	Team	Pld	T	G	FG	P
2011–25	Scotland	22	8	0	0	32

Ben Hellewell (born 30 January 1992) is a former Scotland international rugby league footballer who last played as a second-row forward for Salford Red Devils in the Super League.

He was contracted to the Warrington Wolves in the Super League, playing on loan from Warrington at the York City Knights in the Championship and the Barrow Raiders in Championship 1. He played for Featherstone Rovers in the Co-operative Championship, and on loan from Featherstone at the Dewsbury Rams in the Championship. He has also played for the London Broncos in the Championship and in the Super League, and on loan from the Broncos at the Sheffield Eagles in the Championship. Hellewell also played for the Leigh Centurions in the second-tier and the Super League. Earlier in his career he played as a centre, fullback and winger.

In 2019 he helped the Eagles to win the inaugural 1895 Cup as they defeated the Widnes Vikings 36–18 in the final. He has earned 9 caps for Scotland in the European competitions and the 2013 Rugby League World Cup.

== Background ==
Hellewell was born in Bradford, West Yorkshire, England.

== Playing career ==
=== Early career ===
Hellewell started his career with the Bradford Bulls, coming through the Bulls Academy at his hometown club.

=== Warrington ===
Hellewell moved to Warrington to begin his professional career. He won the Rugby League 9s tournament in June 2011 with Warrington. In 2012 he was sent on loan from Warrington at the York City Knights in the Championship. Hellewell spent part of 2012 on loan at the Barrow Raiders in Championship 1.

=== Featherstone ===
After failing to make a first team appearance for Warrington, he joined Featherstone Rovers in 2012, ahead of the 2013 RFL Championship season. He played for Featherstone Rovers in the Co-operative Championship, and on loan from Featherstone at the Dewsbury Rams in the 2014 Kingstone Press Championship.

=== London Broncos ===
He joined the London Broncos ahead of the 2015 RFL Championship season.

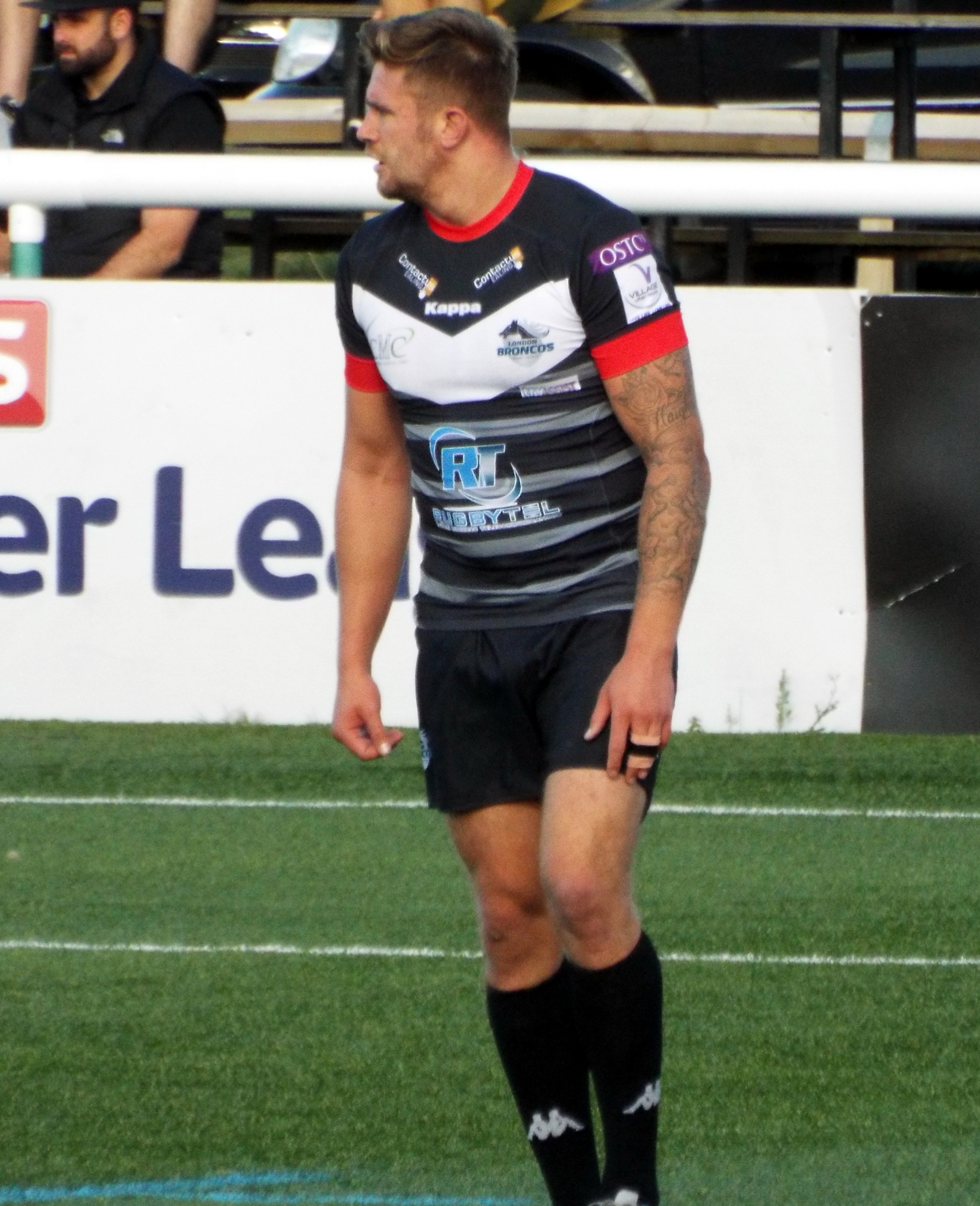
Hellewell playing for the London Broncos in 2016

In 2019 he spent time on loan from the Broncos at the Sheffield Eagles in the Championship. During that spell at the Eagles he helped the Eagles to win the inaugural 1895 Cup as they defeated Widnes 36–18 in the final. In four years in the capital he played over 100 games, including gaining promotion to the Super League.

=== Leigh ===
He joined Leigh ahead of their 2020 RFL Championship season.

=== Featherstone Rovers ===
On 28 May 2022, Hellewell played for Featherstone in their 2022 RFL 1895 Cup final loss against Leigh.

=== Salford Red Devils ===
In the 2023 Super League season, Hellewell played 17 matches for Salford as the club finished 7th on the table and missed the playoffs.

On 10 August 2025 he announced his immediate retirement from rugby league, needing a full hip replacement at just 33 years old.

== International ==
Hellewell was a Scotland international having made his début in 2011. He was named in their squad for the 2013 Rugby League World Cup, and scored two tries in their 30–30 draw with Italy.

In October and November 2014, he played in the 2014 European Cup competition. In October and November 2015, Ben played in the 2015 European Cup competition. He was named in the Scotland squad for 2016 Rugby League Four Nations. He was named in the Scotland squad for 2017 Rugby League World Cup.
