= Mitch Stringer =

Former Scotland international rugby league footballer

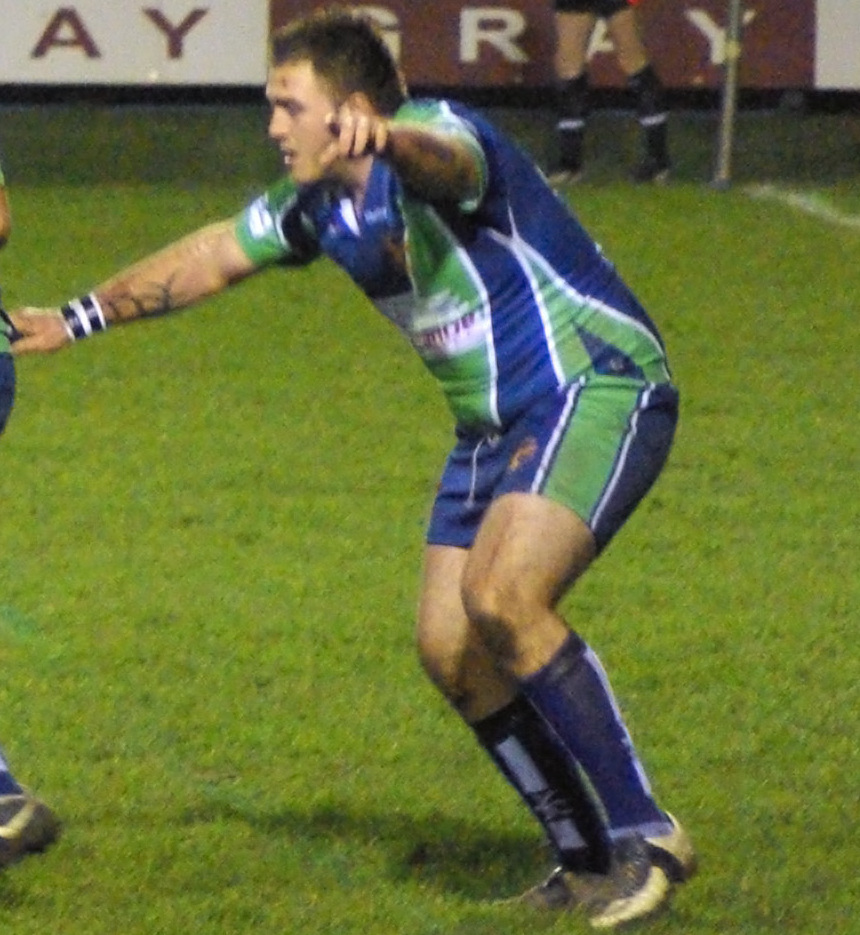

Personal information
- Full name: Mitchell Stringer
- Born: 11 November 1983 (age 42) Barnsley, South Yorkshire, England

Playing information
- Height: 5 ft 1 in (1.56 m)
- Weight: 20 st 0 lb (127 kg)
- Position: Prop
Club
| Years | Team | Pld | T | G | FG | P |
|---|---|---|---|---|---|---|
| 2004–05 | London Broncos | 29 | 0 | 0 | 0 | 0 |
| 2005–06 | Salford City Reds | 16 | 0 | 0 | 0 | 0 |
| 2006–16 | Sheffield Eagles | 312 | 65 | 40 | 0 | 340 |
| 2017 | Dewsbury Rams | 12 | 0 | 0 | 0 | 0 |
| | Total | 369 | 65 | 40 | 0 | 340 |
Representative
| Years | Team | Pld | T | G | FG | P |
| 2009–13 | Scotland | 11 | 3 | 0 | 0 | 12 |

Mitch Stringer (born 1 November 1983), is a former Scotland international rugby league footballer who played as a prop

== Playing career ==
He was brought up in Barnsley, and started his youth playing career at Sheffield Eagles after impressing with local amateur team Hoyland Vikings.

Stringer signed for Salford in 2005 from London Broncos. In 2006 he was re-signed by the Eagles for their successful bid for promotion from National League Two. Stringer has also played as a professional for the London Broncos, Salford City Reds, Dewsbury Rams and the Sheffield Eagles where he became captain.

== International ==
He also made eleven appearances for Scotland, scoring on 3 occasions. His first international game came against Papua New Guinea, where he began the match on the bench. He represented Scotland at the 2013 Rugby League World Cup.
