= Alex Hurst (rugby) =

Former Scotland international rugby league & rugby union footballer

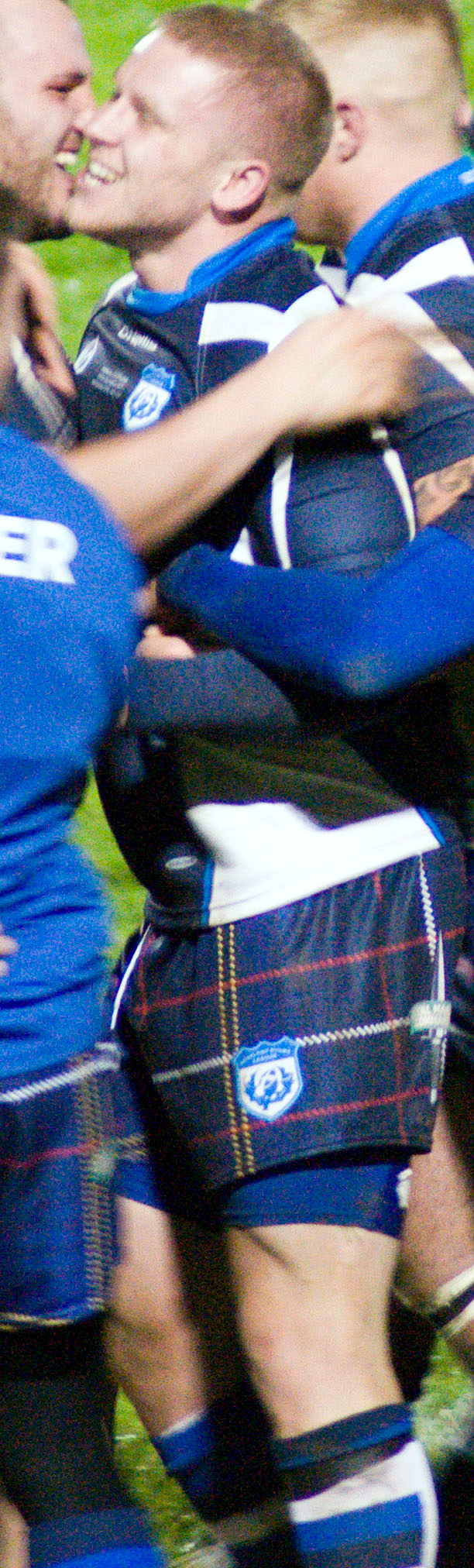

Personal information
- Born: 17 March 1990 (age 35); Salford, Greater Manchester, England
- Height: 6 ft 0 in (183 cm)
- Weight: 14 st 5 lb (91 kg)

Playing information

Rugby league
- Position: Wing, Fullback
Club
Years	Team	Pld	T	G	FG	P
2010–15	Swinton Lions	27	11	0	0	44
2013	London Broncos	11	2	0	0	8
2013(loan)	→ London Skolars	12	11	0	0	44
	Total	50	24	0	0	96
Representative
Years	Team	Pld	T	G	FG	P
2011–14	Scotland	11	4	1	0	18

Rugby union
Club
Years	Team	Pld	T	G	FG	P
2017	Preston Grasshoppers
- Source: As of 31 October 2014

Alex Hurst is a former Scotland international rugby league footballer who last played for the Swinton Lions and now plays rugby union for Preston Grasshoppers R.F.C. He spent the 2013 season in the Super League with the London Broncos.

== Club career ==
On 15 May 2017 it was announced that free-agent Hurst had switched codes to join Preston Grasshoppers R.F.C.

== International ==
He is a Scotland international having made his début in 2011. He was named in their squad for the 2013 Rugby League World Cup.

In October and November 2014, Alex played in the 2014 European Cup competition.
