= Ray Nasso =

Former Italy international rugby league footballer

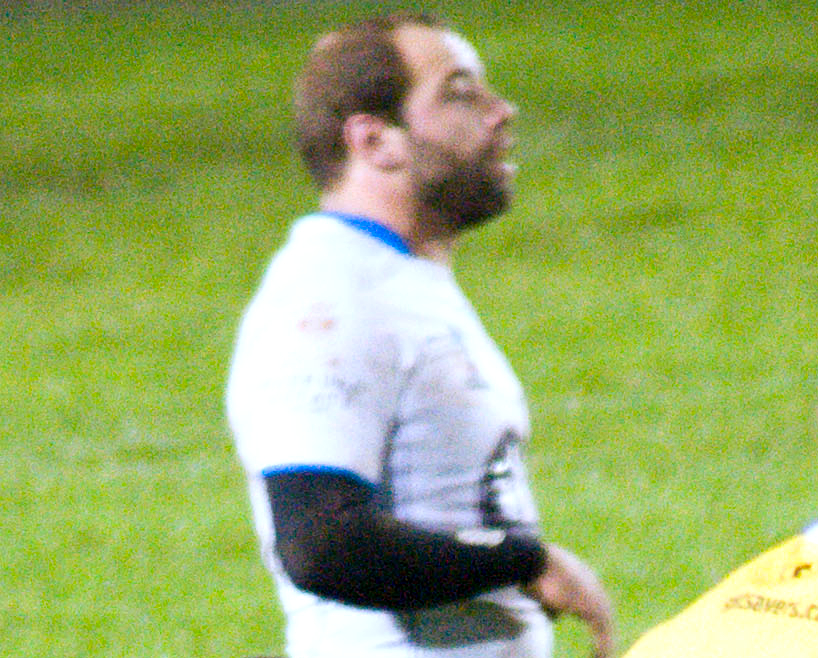

Personal information
- Full name: Raymond Nasso
- Born: 3 July 1987 (age 39) Sydney, New South Wales, Australia
- Height: 180 cm (5 ft 11 in)
- Weight: 110 kg (17 st 5 lb)

Playing information
- Position: Hooker
Club
Years	Team	Pld	T	G	FG	P
200?–11	Windsor Wolves
2011–12	Villefranche XIII Aveyron
2012–14	SO Avignon
2014–15	London Broncos	20	2	0	0	8
2015(DR)	→ Oxford	1	1	0	0	4
2015–16	SO Avignon
	Total	21	3	0	0	12
Representative
Years	Team	Pld	T	G	FG	P
2009–13	Italy	9	5	0	0	20
- Source: As of 16 January 2021

Raymond Nasso (born 3 July 1987) is an Australian-Italian rugby league footballer who played in the 2010s. He played at club level for the London Broncos in the 2015 Kingstone Press Championship season and represented Italy in the 2013 World Cup.

== Playing career ==
He played for SO Avignon in the Elite One Championship as a hooker. He started play in France at Villefranche-de-Rouergue for Villefranche XIII Aveyron in the Elite Two Championship. On 9 July 2014, Nasso signed for the London Broncos for the 2015 and 2016 seasons from Sporting Olympique Avignon.
