= Charlie Tonga =

Tongan rugby league coach and player

Personal information
- Full name: Charles Tonga
- Born: 23 September 1977 (age 48) Nukuʻalofa, Tonga

Playing information
- Height: 5 ft 10 in (1.78 m)
- Weight: 17 st 4 lb (110 kg)
- Position: Prop
Club
Years	Team	Pld	T	G	FG	P
2005	Canterbury Bulldogs	10	0	0	0	0
2006–07	Sydney Roosters	12	0	0	0	0
	Total	22	0	0	0	0

Coaching information
Representative
Years	Team	Gms	W	D	L	W%
2010–13	Tonga	5	3	0	2	60

Charlie Tonga (born 27 September 1977) is a Tongan former professional rugby league footballer and former coach of the Tonga national rugby league team.

== Playing career ==
As a player, Tonga was recognised as a powerful front-row forward, He played in the NRL for Sydney Roosters and Canterbury-Bankstown Bulldogs, and was noted for his damaging running ability.

In his time at both clubs, Tonga played only a handful of NRL matches, and spent most of his time at the Sydney Roosters playing for the club's feeder team, Newtown.

After a wayward youth and a stint in jail on an assault charge, Tonga rose to become an NRL player and a stint coaching the Tongan national side. It was in Woodford Prison as a young man in 2000 that Tonga met former Australian rugby league hooker and pastor Noel Gallagher. The meeting changed Tonga's life. Tonga, now a gentle giant, has said that youthful pride was the problem in his early 20s and when he came out of jail he thought his career as a footballer was finished. A stint in BRL Open 1's with Browns Plains in 2000 (where he would win a Grand Final) followed before his meteoric rise from Easts Tigers to the NRL with the Bulldogs in 2005. Two seasons with the Roosters followed, but re-discovering his roots and helping others became a large part of his life. Tonga won an Ipswich Rugby League title with Swifts in 2011, and retired from playing soon after.

== Post-playing ==
Tonga was later named as coach of his native Tonga and lead the side in the 2013 Rugby League World Cup.

Tonga is a committed Christian pastor and youth minister who is called "Power Up" in Campbelltown, and works with kids at risk.

== Career highlights ==
- FG debut: Canterbury v Newcastle, Energy Australia Stadium, 24 April 2005 (round 7)
- Played in the 2006 Premier League Grand Final (scored one Try)
- Played 20 First Grade Games
