= Carlo Napolitano =

English-Italian rugby coach and footballer

Personal information
- Born: Salford, Greater Manchester, England

Playing information
- Position: Prop
Club
| Years | Team | Pld | T | G | FG | P |
|---|---|---|---|---|---|---|
| 2000 | Salford City Reds | 3 | 1 | 0 | 0 | 4 |
| 2001 | Swinton Lions | 1 | 0 | 0 | 0 | 0 |
| | Total | 4 | 1 | 0 | 0 | 4 |
Representative
| Years | Team | Pld | T | G | FG | P |
| 1999 | Italy | 1 | 0 | 0 | 0 | 0 |

Coaching information
Representative
| Years | Team | Gms | W | D | L | W% |
| 2011–13 | Italy | 8 | 6 | 0 | 2 | 75 |

Carlo Napolitano is an Italian rugby league coach and former player. He is the former head coach of Italy, having taken charge of the national side in 2004, and being succeeded by Trent Barrett in 2014.

== Career ==
He coached Italy during the 2013 Rugby League World Cup qualifying tournament, and reprised his role at the 2013 Rugby League World Cup

Following this Carlo moved to Australia where he made his debut for the Port Kembla Pumas where he quickly became a club legend by being the first player to take the field in all 4 divisions within a single season.

== Other ventures ==
Carlo Napolitano is now the chief executive officer of Armada Advisory and Castle Compensation Partners. He is also committee member of Australian Alopecia Areata Foundation (AAAF), an Australian national body dedicated to improving lives of people living with Alopecia Areata and their families.
