= Daniel Foster (rugby league) =

Tonga international rugby league footballer

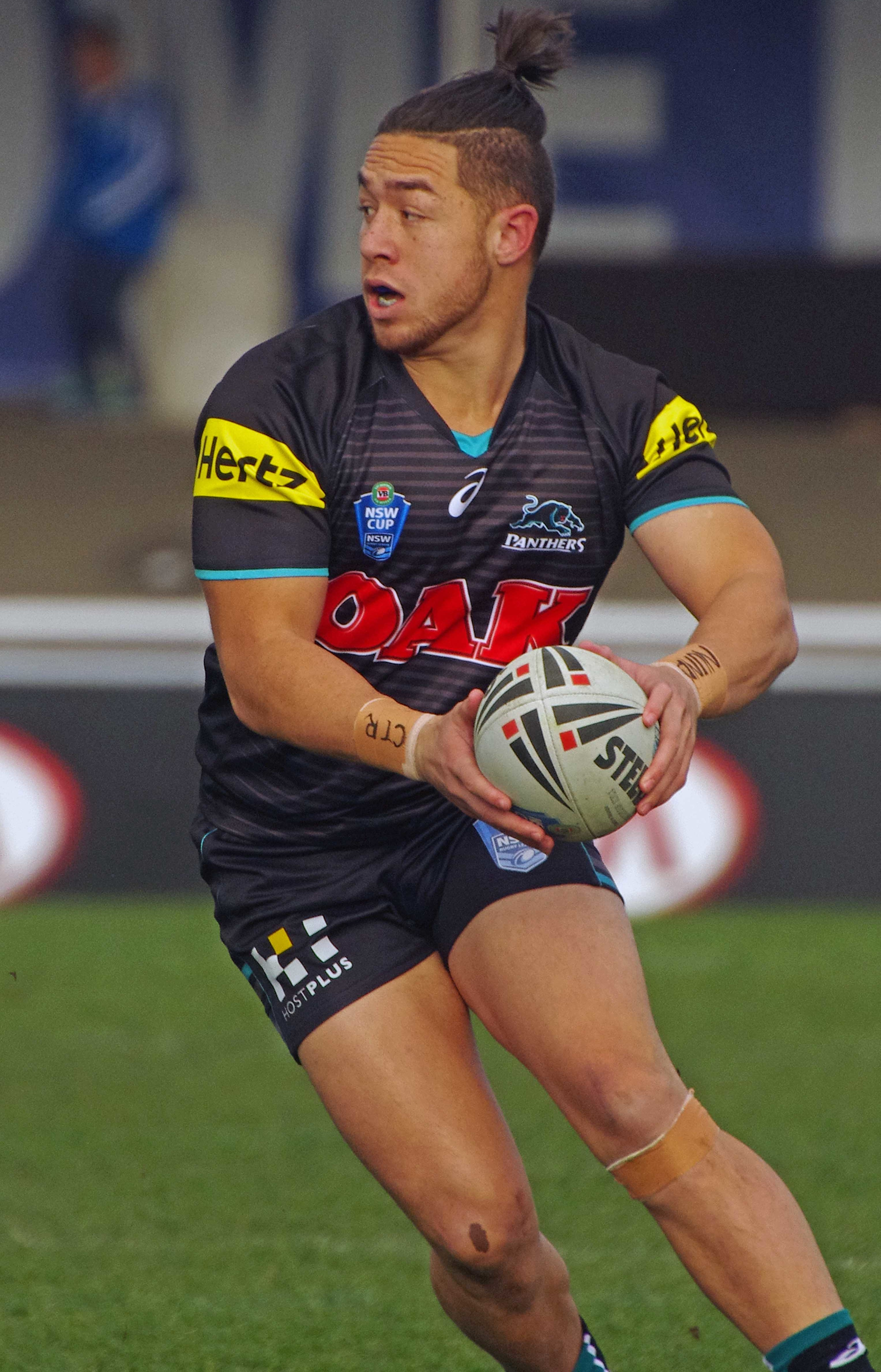

Personal information
- Born: 20 April 1993 (age 33) Maitland, New South Wales, Australia
- Height: 185 cm (6 ft 1 in)
- Weight: 93 kg (14 st 9 lb)

Playing information
- Position: Halfback, Five-eighth, Hooker
Representative
Years	Team	Pld	T	G	FG	P
2013–15	Tonga	6	1	0	1	4

Daniel Foster, also known by the nickname of "Fozzie", is an Australia-born Tonga international rugby league footballer who plays for the Easts Tigers in the Queensland Cup.

== Background ==
Born in Maitland, New South Wales, Australia, Foster is of Tongan descent through his mother.

== Playing career ==
He played his junior rugby league for the Western Suburbs Rosellas before being signed by the Newcastle Knights. Foster played for the Penrith Panthers' NYC team in 2012 and 2013, captaining the team in their 42–30 Grand Final win over the New Zealand Warriors on 6 October 2013. He played for the Panthers' NSW Cup side in 2014 and 2015. On 26 October 2015, Foster signed a two-year deal with the Easts Tigers, a feeder club to the Melbourne Storm.

=== Representative career ===
Foster made his international debut for Tonga on 20 April 2013 in their Pacific Rugby League match against Samoa. He was a member of Tonga's 2013 World Cup campaign, playing in all three of their group stage matches. Foster scored a try in Tonga's 16–0 win over Italy.

Foster was named in Tonga's team to face Papua New Guinea in a one-off match on 19 October 2014. On 18 October 2015, he played in Tonga's 2017 World Cup qualifying match against the Cook Islands. He was the only Tongan player selected without any prior NRL experience.
