= Matthew Petersen =

US international rugby league footballer (born 1980)

Matt Petersen
Personal information
- Full name: Matthew Andrew Petersen
- Born: 27 March 1980 (age 46) Subiaco, Western Australia, Australia

Playing information
- Height: 181 cm (5 ft 11 1/2 in)
- Weight: 95 kg (14 st 13 lb; 209 lb)
- Position: Wing
Club
| Years | Team | Pld | T | G | FG | P |
|---|---|---|---|---|---|---|
| 2002 | North Qld Cowboys | 8 | 2 | 0 | 0 | 8 |
| 2002–06 | Parramatta Eels | 65 | 38 | 0 | 0 | 152 |
| 2007–08 | Gold Coast Titans | 21 | 14 | 0 | 0 | 56 |
| 2008–09 | Wakefield Trinity Wildcats | 16 | 4 | 0 | 0 | 16 |
| | Total | 110 | 58 | 0 | 0 | 232 |
Representative
| Years | Team | Pld | T | G | FG | P |
| 2004–13 | USA | 8 | 2 | 0 | 0 | 8 |

Matthew Andrew Petersen (born 27 March 1980) is a former United States international rugby league footballer who played for the Wakefield Trinity Wildcats in the Super League. He also played for the Gold Coast Titans in the NRL. His position of choice was on the wing.

== Background ==
Petersen was born in Subiaco, Western Australia. He played his junior rugby league for Belmont Steelers in the Western Australian Rugby League.

== Playing career ==
After playing for the Belmont Steelers, a Western Australian feeder club for the North Queensland Cowboys, Petersen was called up to the NRL in 2002. Petersen moved from North Queensland to the Parramatta Eels halfway through 2002 and played for the Eels with some success until 2006. Early in his career at the Eels, Petersen was at the centre of a spiteful match against the Brisbane Broncos at Parramatta Stadium after Allan Langer appeared to drop his knees into Petersen, some members of the crowd later throwing bottles at Broncos players.

Petersen equalled the club try-scoring record for one match during the 2003 round 12 clash against the South Sydney Rabbitohs. Scoring four tries in the one game, he was the first Parramatta player to have done so since 1988.

In 2005, Petersen made 13 appearances for Parramatta as the club won the Minor Premiership but he did not feature in any of the finals matches.

Parramatta care-taker coach, Jason Taylor, dropped Petersen from the first-grade roster when he took over coaching duties in May, 2006, and demoted the under-performing winger to the Premier League, where he spent the rest of the season.

"Side-Show Bob" joined the Titans in 2007 for their first year in the NRL. He performed well and was well known as "Sideshow Bob" due to his thick, curly hair. He ended the season with the most tries scored, shared with Mat Rogers. At the end of 2007 he played for America. In May, 2008, he was given an immediate release to join Super League side Wakefield Trinity Wildcats.

In 2012, he played rugby league in Gympie.

=== Griffith Uni Colleges Knights ===
Since 2017, Petersen has been a player and specialist backs coach for the Griffith Uni Colleges Knights Rugby Union Club. Petersen helped the Knights to their Second Gold Coast District Rugby Union Premiership in 2018 in his position of backs coach. Club Captain Shaun Cole was quoted as saying "Without Petersens help with our defensive patterns the club wouldn't be where it is today" He has since re-signed for the 2019 season.

=== Representative career ===
In 2004, Petersen played a game for the United States against Australia in an exhibition match in Philadelphia, qualifying for the American side under the parent rule.

In 2007, Petersen was named as captain of the USA team for their 2008 Rugby League World Cup qualifying match against Samoa. He was awarded Man of the Match for the game, but could not stop the USA falling to defeat.

Petersen made a comeback in 2013, being named as part of the USA squad for the 2013 Rugby League World Cup. He scored a try in their opening win over the Cook Islands.

== Career highlights ==
- First Grade Début: 2002 – Round 1, North Queensland v Brisbane at Dairy Farmers Stadium, 16 March
- International: 2004 – United States vs Australia, scoring one try
