= Derwent Park =

Stadium in Workington, England

Derwent Park RL
- Town Ground
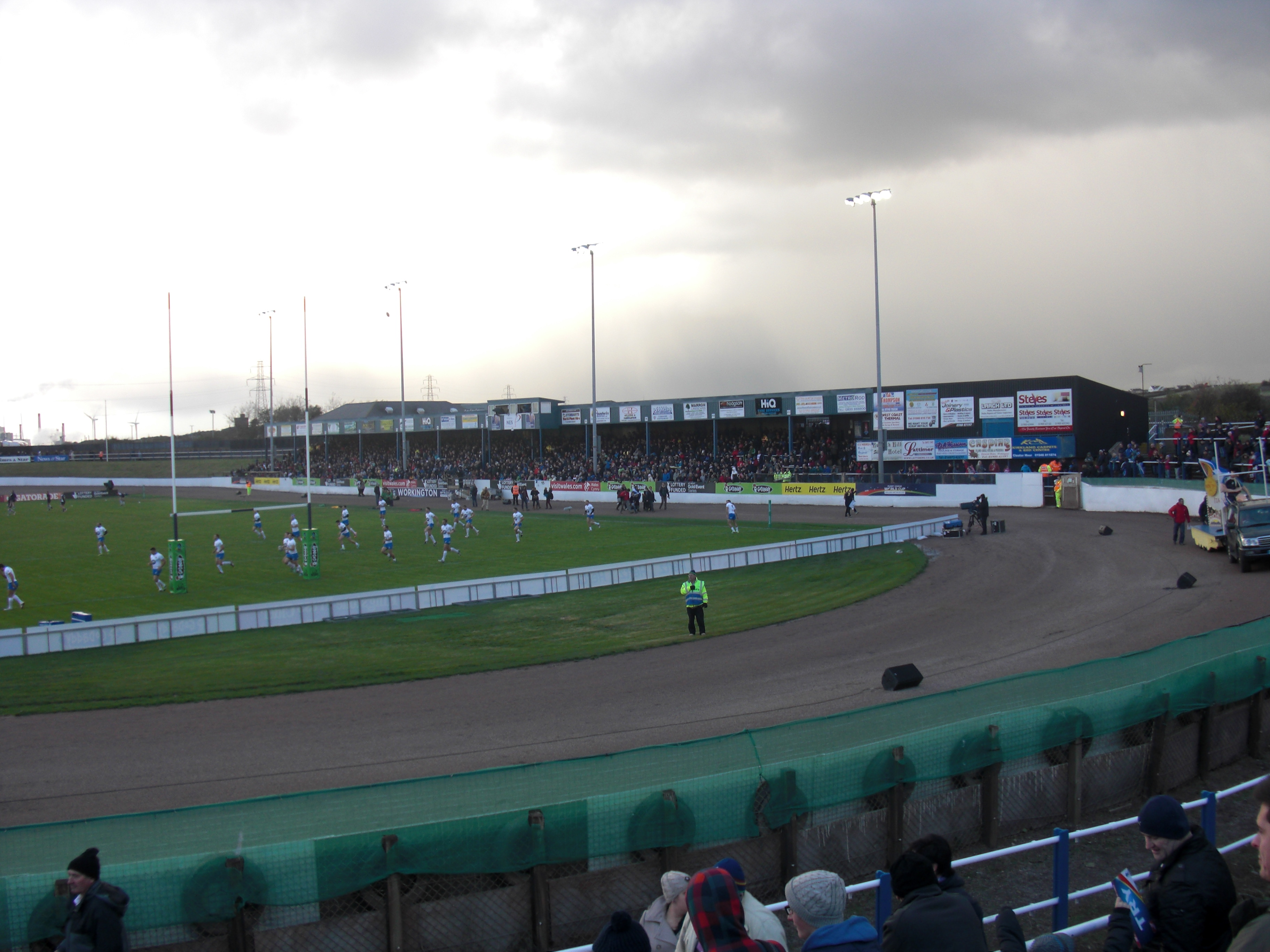
- Interactive map of Derwent Park RL
- Full name: Derwent Park Stadium
- Former names: Zebra Claims Stadium (2016 for sponsorship reasons)
- Location: Workington, Cumbria
- Coordinates: 54°38′53″N 3°33′20″W
- Capacity: 10,000
- Record attendance: 17,741 - Workington Town vs Wigan, 13 March 1965

Construction
- Built: 1956
- Opened: 1956

Tenants
- Workington Town (1956–); Workington Comets (1970–1981, 1999–2018); Workington Tigers (1987)

Derwent Park is a Rugby League Stadium and former motorcycle speedway in Workington, England situated beside the Cumbrian River Derwent. It is used mostly for rugby league matches and is the home stadium of Workington Town who play in League 1 the 3rd tier of the British rugby league system. Derwent Park has a capacity of 12,000 people with 1,200 seats and the pitch is surrounded by a 398 yards (364 metres) motorcycle speedway track.

== History ==
The stadium was opened in 1956. The record attendance at Derwent Park was set on 13 March 1965 when 17,741 spectators turned up for a third round Challenge Cup match against Wigan.

Speedway began in Workington after a successful application was made by the promotion team for a licence to race at Derwent Park for the 1970 season. The promoters included former rider Ian Thomas and the rugby pitch required moving 25 yards sideways to accommodate the speedway track. Workington Comets raced at the stadium from 1970 until 1982.

Speedway returned to Derwent Park for one season in 1987, when Glasgow Tigers arrived to race, while searching for a new home. However the team changed its name to Workington Tigers soon afterwards but held their last fixture against Stoke on 31 July. The team's results were expunged. It was the last season of speedway at Workington for twelve years.

Floodlights were installed in 1990 and were first used on 17 October when Cumbria faced the touring Australians during the 1990 Kangaroo Tour in front of 6,750 fans on a cold night with Australia victorious 42–10 in a dominant display. Derwent also hosted the opening game of the 1994 Kangaroo Tour between Cumbria and Australia on a cold, wet day in front of only 4,227 fans. Australia were again dominant, winning 52–8 (In both 1990 and 1994, the Australian team was composed mainly of the mid-week team and not those who were expected to play Test matches).

Speedway returned for a third time in 1999 and continued until 2019.

== Future ==
In February 2019 plans for a new stadium for Workington were announced, this would in involve the demolition of Borough Park and Derwent Park.

In June 2019, it was announced by the new leadership of Allerdale Borough Council that the new sports stadium would not be built.

In 2025, Cumberland Council (successor to Allerdale Council) announced that Cumberland Sports Village will be built on the site of Workington AFC's Borough Park, being shared by Workington AFC & Workington Town. Work should be completed in summer 2027, with AFC using Derwent Park in the interim.

== Internationals ==
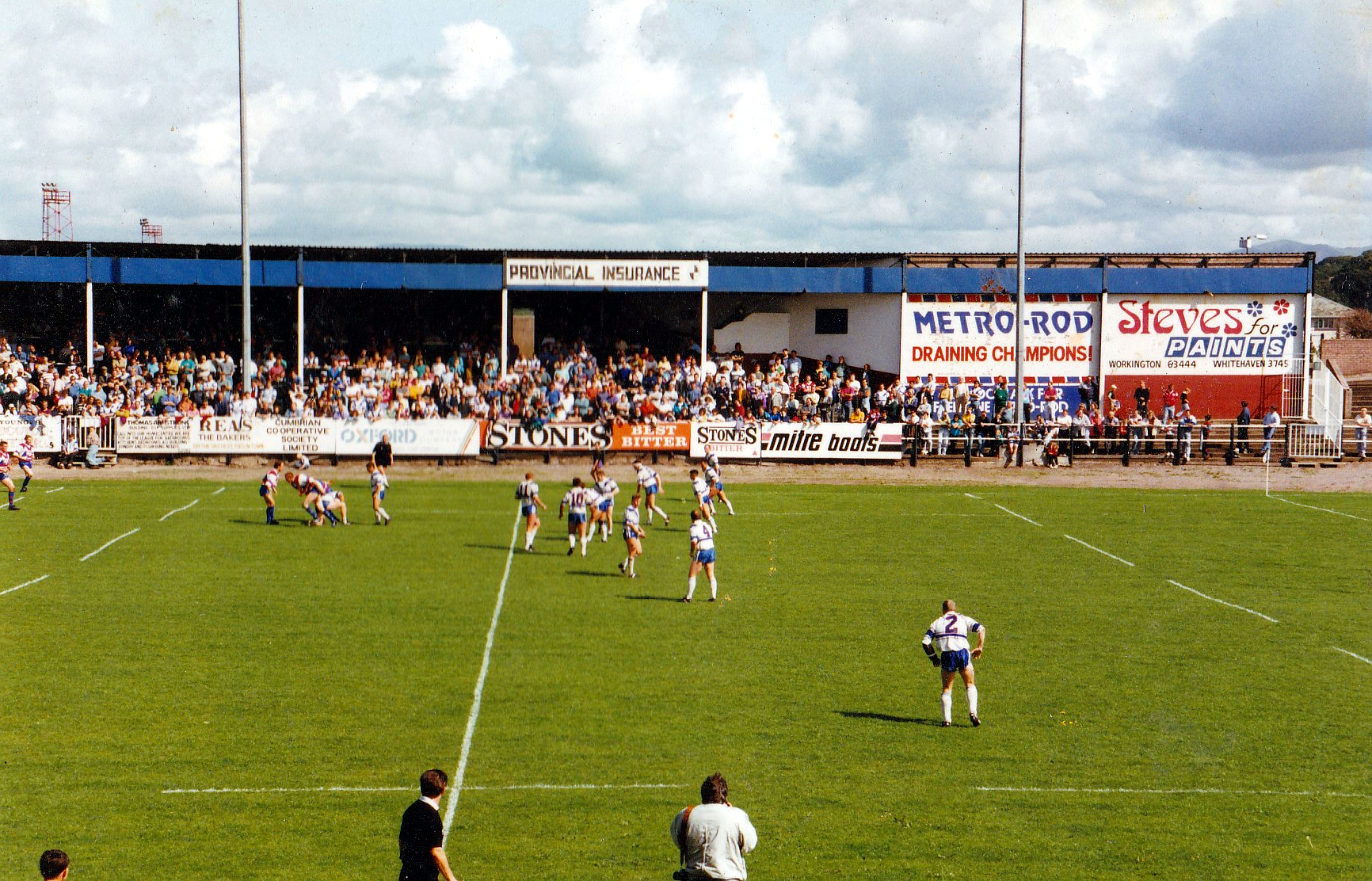
Leeds on the attack against Workington Town at Derwent Park in August 1994

=== Cumbria home matches ===
Derwent Park has seen the county team Cumberland / Cumbria play host to various international touring teams.

Date	Opponent	Result	Attendance
31 October 1963	Australia	0–21	8,229
18 November 1967	Australia	17–15	7,545
17 October 1990	Australia	10–42	6,750
18 October 1992	Australia	0–44	5,156
2 October 1994	Australia	8–52	4,277
27 October 2004	(Australia) (New Zealand) Anzacs	12–64	4,203
25 October 2006	Tonga	28–16	1,639
7 October 2022	Jamaica	28–16	3,000+

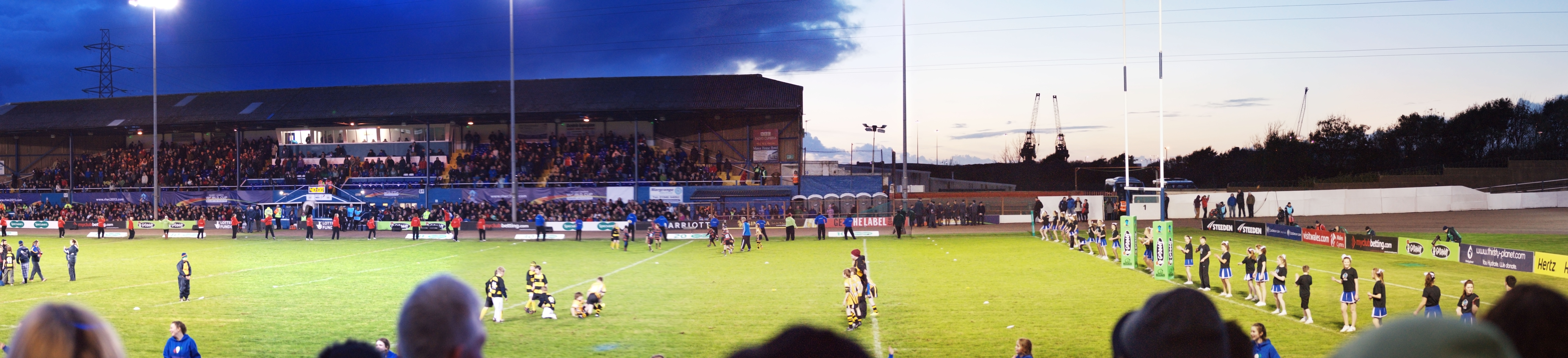
Scotland vs. Italy at Derwent Park, Workington in 2013

=== Other internationals ===
On 19 May 1995 Derwent Park was the host for the rugby union warm-up game between Italy and Ireland before the 1995 Rugby World Cup. Italy defeated Ireland 32–26 in front of 3,000 fans.

Derwent Park held its first full international match on 1 December 2000 with the Aotearoa Māori versus Samoa game in the 2000 Rugby League World Cup. Samoa defeated Aotearoa Māori 21–16 in front of 4,107 fans.

On 14 July 1990 the stadium was host to the "Cumbria Rock Festival" and bands included: Magnum, Saxon, Dogs D'Amour, Wolfsbane, the Almighty and Romeo's Daughter. On 13 July 1991, the second edition of the festival saw appearances by Marillion, Wolfsbane (who replaced Blackfoot on the bill as special guests), the Almighty, Atom Seed, Cheap and Nasty, FM, Jagged Edge, Sweet Addiction, Loud, Lisa Dominique, Dumpy's Rusty Nuts and Rattlesnake Kiss.

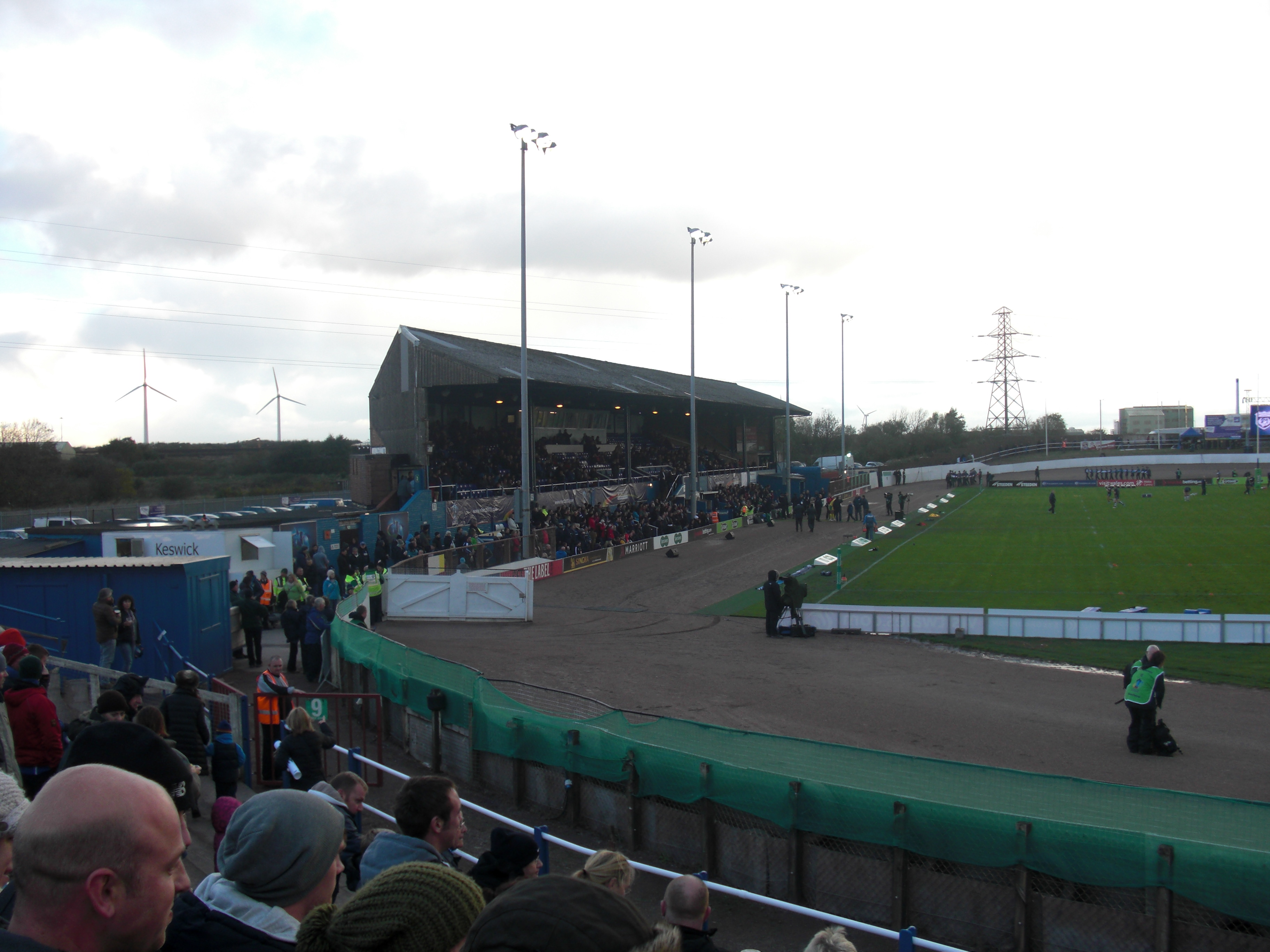
Derwent Park at the RLWC in 2013

The stadium hosted two matches at Rugby League World Cup 2013: Scotland's ties against Tonga on Tuesday 29 October, watched in front of 7,630, and Italy Sunday 3 November, watched in front of 7,280.

As part of the 2014 Rugby League European Cup, Derwent Park hosted the match between Scotland and Wales on 17 October. Scotland won the game 42-18.

On 5 December 2014 it was announced that Workington Town had signed a lucrative sponsorship deal that would see the stadium renamed as the Zebra Claims Stadium for the start of the 2015 season.

As part of the 2016 Rugby League Four Nations, the Zebra Claims Stadium hosted the match between New Zealand and Scotland on 11 November. The game ended in an 18-18 draw.

Summary

The following is a list of non-Cumbrian international matches played at Derwent Park since its opening in 1956.

Date	Result	Attendance	Tournament
1 November 2000	Samoa 21–16 Aotearoa Māori	4,107	2000 Rugby League World Cup Group 4
29 October 2013	Scotland 26–24 Tonga	7,630	2013 Rugby League World Cup Group C
3 November 2013	Scotland 30–30 Italy	7,280	2013 Rugby League World Cup Group C
27 October 2014	Scotland 42–18 Wales	2,036	2014 European Cup
11 November 2016	New Zealand 18–18 Scotland	6,628	2016 Rugby League Four Nations
