= Chris Centrone =

Italy international rugby league footballer

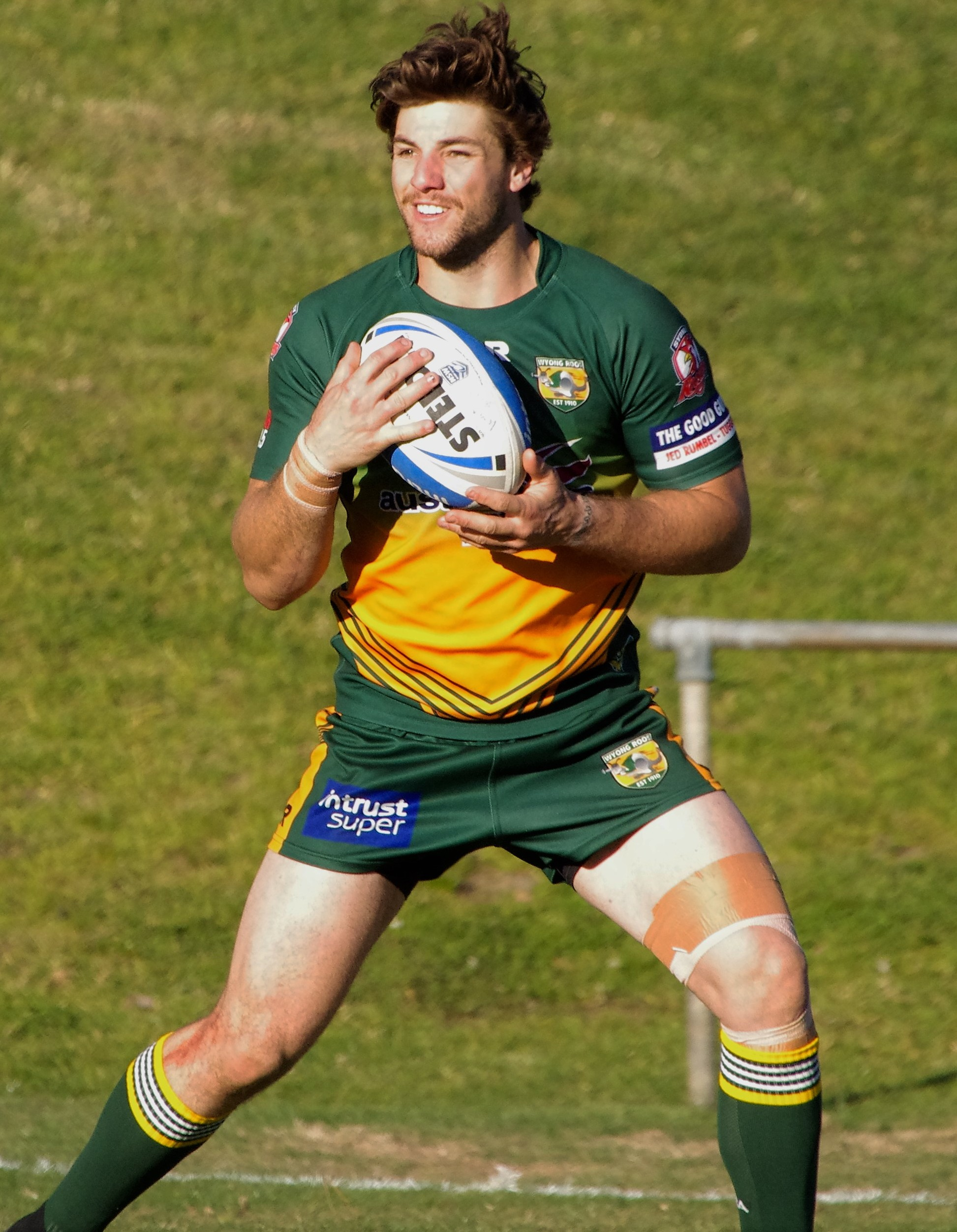

Personal information
- Full name: Christopher Centrone
- Born: 24 July 1991 (age 33); Newcastle, New South Wales, Australia
- Height: 187 cm (6 ft 2 in)
- Weight: 95 kg (14 st 13 lb)

Playing information
- Position: Centre, Wing
Club
Years	Team	Pld	T	G	FG	P
2018	Toulouse Olympique	15	15	0	0	60
Representative
Years	Team	Pld	T	G	FG	P
2013–17	Italy	7	3	0	0	12
2017	NSW Residents	1	0	0	0	0
- Source: As of 10 January 2024

Christopher Centrone (born 24 July 1991) is an Italy international rugby league footballer who plays as a centre and wing for Toulouse Olympique in the Championship.

== Background ==
Born in Newcastle, New South Wales, Centrone is of Italian descent. He played his junior rugby league for the Nelson Bay Marlins before being signed by the Canterbury-Bankstown Bulldogs.

== Playing career ==
In 2010 and 2011, Centrone played for the Canterbury-Bankstown Bulldogs' NYC team.

In 2012, Centrone joined the North Sydney Bears in the New South Wales Cup. In 2013, after impressing for North Sydney, Centrone was signed by the South Sydney Rabbitohs.

At the end of 2013, Centrone was named in Italy's 2013 World Cup squad. He scored a try in Italy's first game of the tournament against Wales.

In 2014, Centrone joined the Wyong Roos in the New South Wales Cup.

In 2016, Centrone represented Italy at the 2017 World Cup qualifiers, scoring a try against Russia. In 2017, Centrone was a member of Italy's 2017 World Cup squad.

In May 2018, Centrone left Wyong to join Toulouse Olympique in the Championship.
