= Brett Carter (rugby league) =

Scotland international rugby league footballer

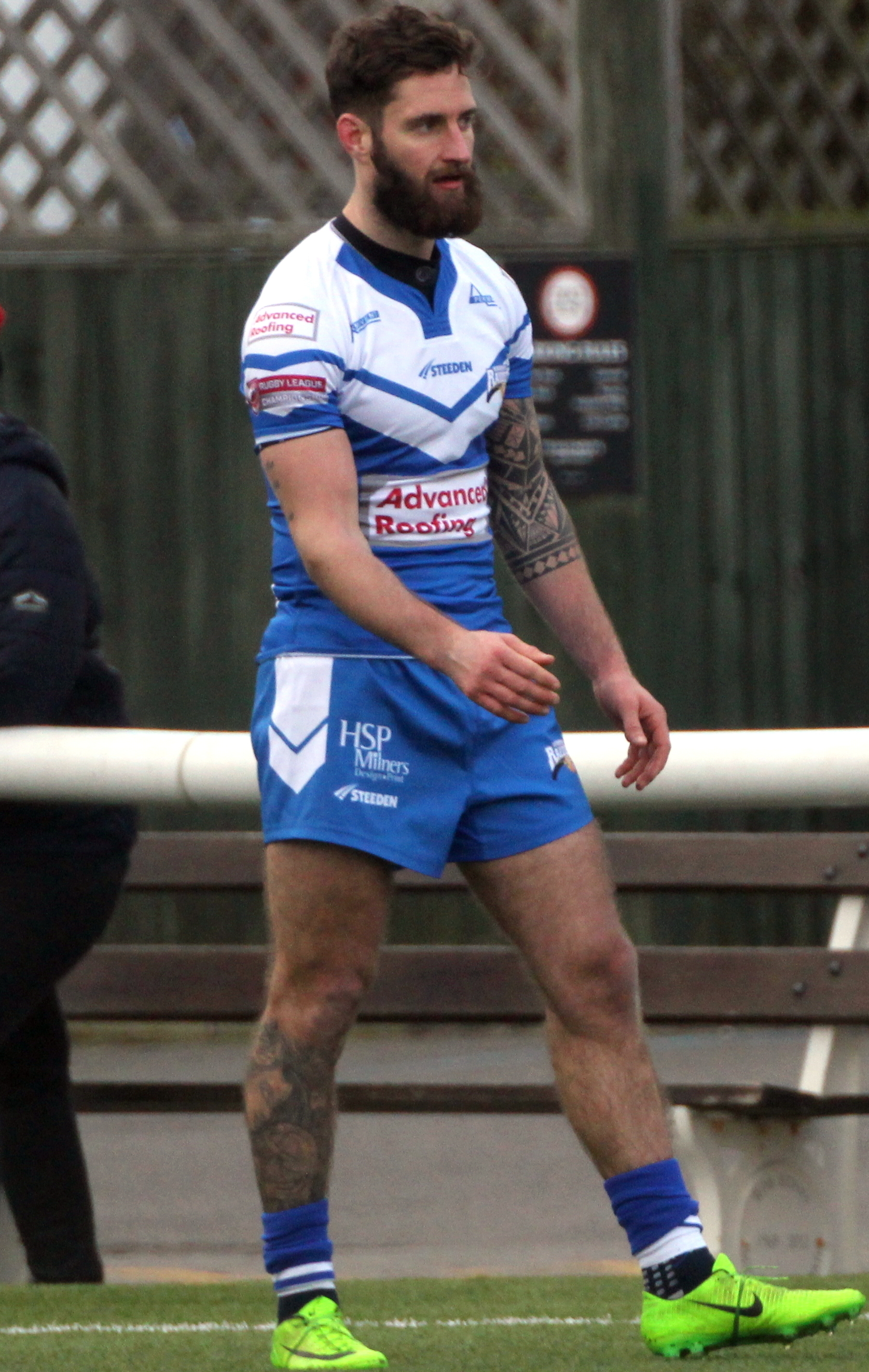

Personal information
- Born: 9 July 1988 (age 38) Barrow-in-Furness, Cumbria, England

Playing information
- Position: Centre, Fullback, Wing
Club
Years	Team	Pld	T	G	FG	P
2008	Barrow Raiders	3	0	0	0	0
2009–16	Workington Town	143	52	30	0	268
2017–19	Barrow Raiders	42	14	8	0	72
2020–21	Whitehaven	3	0	0	0	0
2022–	Barrow Raiders	20	2	0	0	8
	Total	211	68	38	0	348
Representative
Years	Team	Pld	T	G	FG	P
2010–26	Scotland	7	2	0	0	8
2022–	Cumbria	1	0	0	0	0
- Source: As of 22 October 2026

Brett Carter (born 9 July 1988) is a Scotland international rugby league footballer who plays as a centre, wing or fullback for Barrow Raiders in the Championship.

== Background ==
Carter was born in Barrow-in-Furness, Cumbria, England.

== Career ==
=== Barrow Raiders ===
Carter started his career in his hometown with Barrow before moving to Workington Town in 2009.

=== Whitehaven RLFC ===
On 27 November 2019 it was announced that Carter had joined Whitehaven R.L.F.C. Carter played only three games before the cancellation of the 2020 season, but then signed a one-year deal to remain at Whitehaven for the 2021 season.

== International ==
He is a Scotland international having made his début in 2010. He was named in their squad for the 2013 Rugby League World Cup, and scored a try in their opening victory over Tonga.
