= 2013 Rugby League World Cup =

14th Rugby League World Cup tournament

2013 World Cup
- Number of teams: 14
- Host countries: England; Wales
- Winner: Australia (10th title)
- Matches played: 28
- Attendance: 458,483 (16,374 per match)
- Top scorer: (New Zealand) Shaun Johnson (76)
- Top try scorer: (Australia) Brett Morris (Australia) Jarryd Hayne (9 tries each)

The 2013 Rugby League World Cup was the fourteenth World Cup for men's national rugby league teams. It took place between the 26 October and 30 November and was hosted by England and Wales (although some games were played in France and Ireland). Australia won the tournament, beating New Zealand 34–2 in the final to lift the trophy for the tenth time.

Originally planned to take place in 2012 it was moved back a year to avoid clashing with the London Olympics in 2012.

It was the main event of the year's Festival of World Cups. Fourteen teams contested the tournament: Australia, England, New Zealand, Samoa, Wales, Fiji, France, Papua New Guinea, Ireland, Scotland, Tonga, Cook Islands, Italy and the United States. The latter two were competing in the Rugby League World Cup for the first time.

New Zealand were the defending champions, having defeated Australia in 2008.

In terms of attendance, exposure and revenue, the 2013 tournament is considered the most successful Rugby League World Cup to date.

== Organisation ==
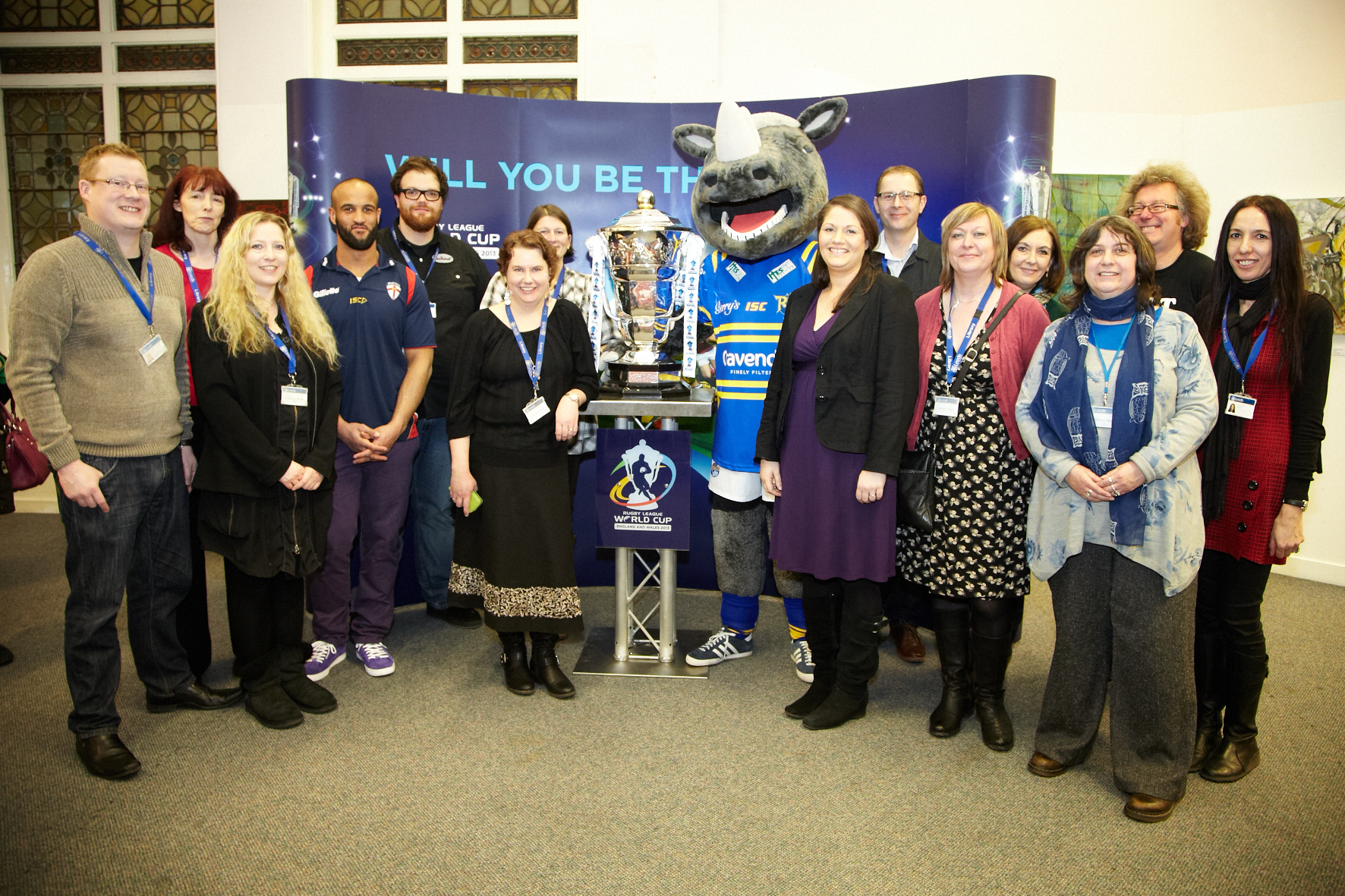
Representatives of the game with the trophy at Leeds Central Library.

=== Background ===
The Rugby League International Federation confirmed this competition as a part of its international program. The RLIF announced a five-year plan to build up to the 2013 World Cup with Four Nations tournaments held in 2009, 2010 and 2011. The competition was part of the UK's "Golden Decade of Sport". 2013 was chosen as the year of the World Cup to avoid a clash with the London Olympics in 2012. After 2013, the Cup will be held on a quadrennial cycle.

=== Host selection ===
In addition to the United Kingdom, Australia announced its intention to bid for the hosting rights, despite hosting the previous World Cup in 2008. The Australian Rugby League had been preparing a rival bid due to the success of the 2008 event but the business plan presented by the Rugby Football League for the UK to be the host was accepted by the RLIF at a meeting in July 2009. The event formed part of what was being dubbed a 'Golden Decade' in British Sport.

The UK last hosted the World Cup in 2000, with the event generally being considered unsuccessful.

The then Prince of Wales, HRH Prince Charles welcomed representatives of all 14 nations and tournament organisers with a reception at Clarence House.

== Qualification ==
There were two qualifying pools for the remaining two World Cup places; a European and an Atlantic pool, with one side from each to qualify.

The European Qualifying group involved Italy, Lebanon, Russia and Serbia while the Atlantic Qualifying group involved Jamaica, South Africa and the United States. In the Atlantic Qualifiers the United States and Jamaica defeated South Africa in the opening rounds leaving the final match between the two to determine who qualified for the 2013 Rugby League World Cup. United States defeated Jamaica to qualify for their first ever Rugby League World Cup.

- Qualifying Pool One (Europe)
  - Italy
  - Lebanon
  - Russia
  - Serbia
- Qualifying Pool Two (Atlantic)
  - Jamaica
  - South Africa
  - United States

== Teams ==
The competition featured fourteen teams, compared to ten in 2008. Originally around twenty teams were to be involved in qualification, but subsequently the total number of teams involved in the tournament was fixed at nineteen. Twelve nations automatically qualified; the ten nations that contested the previous World Cup, Wales as winners of the 2009 European Nations Cup and the Cook Islands as runners up in the 2009 Pacific Cup. Italy and the United States made their debuts for the first time.

Team	Nickname	Coach	Captain	RLIF rank
Australia (14th appearance)	The Kangaroos	Tim Sheens	Cameron Smith	1
Cook Islands (2nd appearance)	The Kukis	David Fairleigh	Zeb Taia	18
England (5th appearance)	The Wall of White	Steve McNamara	Kevin Sinfield	3
Fiji (4th appearance)	The Bati	Rick Stone	Petero Civoniceva	7
France (14th appearance)	Les Chanticleers	Richard Agar	Olivier Elima	4
Ireland (3rd appearance)	The Wolfhounds	Mark Aston	Liam Finn	9
Italy (1st appearance)	The Azzurri	Carlo Napolitano	Anthony Minichiello	13
New Zealand (14th appearance)	The Kiwis	Stephen Kearney	Simon Mannering	2
Papua New Guinea (6th appearance)	The Kumuls	Adrian Lam	Neville Costigan	6
Samoa (4th appearance)	Toa Samoa	Matt Parish	Harrison Hansen	8
Scotland (3rd appearance)	The Bravehearts	Steve McCormack	Danny Brough	11
Tonga (4th appearance)	Mate Ma'a Tonga	Charlie Tonga	Brent Kite	10
United States (1st appearance)	The Tomahawks	Terry Matterson	Joseph Paulo	12
Wales (4th appearance)	The Dragons	Iestyn Harris	Craig Kopczak	5

== Match officials ==
Rules and officiating panel: Daniel Anderson, Stuart Cummings and David Waite.

- Australia: Ben Cummins, Shayne Hayne, Ashley Klein and Grant Atkins.
- England: Phil Bentham, Richard Silverwood, Ben Thaler; James Child, Joe Cobb, Mark Craven, Robert Hicks, Chris Leatherbarrow, Tony Martin, Tim Roby, Clint Sharrad, George Stokes, Matt Thomason and Warren Turley
- France: Thierry Alibert and Jose Pereira
- New Zealand: Henry Perenara and Jamal Thompson.

== Pre-tournament matches ==
Before the World Cup it was announced that USA would face France in Toulouse, Scotland would play Papua New Guinea at Featherstone, England would play Italy at Salford, New Zealand would play the Cook Islands in Doncaster and England Knights would play Samoa at Salford.

18 October 2013

France	18–22	United States

Stade des Minimes, Toulouse

19 October 2013

Rochdale Hornets	0–78	Fiji

Spotland Stadium, Rochdale

19 October 2013

England	14–15	Italy

AJ Bell Stadium, Salford

19 October 2013

England Knights	52–16	Samoa

AJ Bell Stadium, Salford

19 October 2013

Papua New Guinea	38–20	Scotland

Post Office Road, Featherstone

20 October 2013

New Zealand	50–0	Cook Islands

Keepmoat Stadium, Doncaster

== Venues ==
The games were played at various venues in England, Wales, Ireland, and France.

The Millennium Stadium in Cardiff was the host stadium for the opening ceremony and a double header featuring hosts England playing Australia and Wales taking on Italy. The decision to play England vs Australia in Cardiff to open the tournament drew criticism from some in the press who believed that the game should have been played in England where a higher attendance could be expected, or at least a full house which would have looked better than the almost half empty Millennium Stadium.

Headingley in Leeds, the Halliwell Jones Stadium in Warrington, the Racecourse Ground in Wrexham and the DW Stadium in Wigan hosted the quarter-finals. Both semi-finals were hosted at Wembley Stadium, with the final held at Old Trafford.

(England) London		(England) Manchester		(Wales) Cardiff	
Wembley Stadium		Old Trafford		Millennium Stadium	
Capacity: 90,000		Capacity: 76,212		Capacity: 74,500	
(Republic of Ireland) Limerick	(England) Hull	(England) Wigan	(England) Huddersfield	(England) Leeds	(England) St. Helens
Thomond Park	KC Stadium	DW Stadium	John Smith's Stadium	Headingley	Langtree Park
Capacity: 26,500	Capacity: 25,586	Capacity: 25,133	Capacity: 24,500	Capacity: 21,062	Capacity: 18,000
(France) Avignon	Locations of the 2013 Rugby League World Cup host venues Locations of the 2013 Rugby League World Cup host venues in Northern England				(England) Warrington
Parc des Sports	Locations of the 2013 Rugby League World Cup host venues Locations of the 2013 Rugby League World Cup host venues in Northern England				Halliwell Jones Stadium
Capacity: 17,518	Locations of the 2013 Rugby League World Cup host venues Locations of the 2013 Rugby League World Cup host venues in Northern England				Capacity: 15,200
(England) Halifax	Locations of the 2013 Rugby League World Cup host venues Locations of the 2013 Rugby League World Cup host venues in Northern England				(France) Perpignan
The Shay	Locations of the 2013 Rugby League World Cup host venues Locations of the 2013 Rugby League World Cup host venues in Northern England				Stade Gilbert Brutus
Capacity: 14,061	Locations of the 2013 Rugby League World Cup host venues Locations of the 2013 Rugby League World Cup host venues in Northern England				Capacity: 13,000
(England) Bristol	Locations of the 2013 Rugby League World Cup host venues Locations of the 2013 Rugby League World Cup host venues in Northern England				(England) Salford
Memorial Stadium	Locations of the 2013 Rugby League World Cup host venues Locations of the 2013 Rugby League World Cup host venues in Northern England				Salford City Stadium
Capacity: 12,100	Locations of the 2013 Rugby League World Cup host venues Locations of the 2013 Rugby League World Cup host venues in Northern England				Capacity: 12,000
(England) Leigh	(Wales) Wrexham	(England) Rochdale	(England) Hull	(England) Workington	(Wales) Neath
Leigh Sports Village	Racecourse Ground	Spotland	Craven Park	Derwent Park	The Gnoll
Capacity: 11,000	Capacity: 10,500	Capacity: 10,249	Capacity: 10,000	Capacity: 10,000	Capacity: 5,000

== Match schedule ==
The match schedule was announced on 22 March 2012. The Rugby League International Federation announced the kickoff times of the matches, with the opening kickoff to be held on 26 October in Cardiff, at 14:30 local time. The group stage matches will be played at 14:00, 14:30, 16:00, 16:30, 18:00, and 20:00 local time, with knockout stage matches at 13:00, 15:00, and 20:00 local time. The semi-finals will be played at 13:00 and 15:30 local time and the final, on 30 November 2013 at the Old Trafford stadium, at 14:30 local time.

== Opening ceremony ==
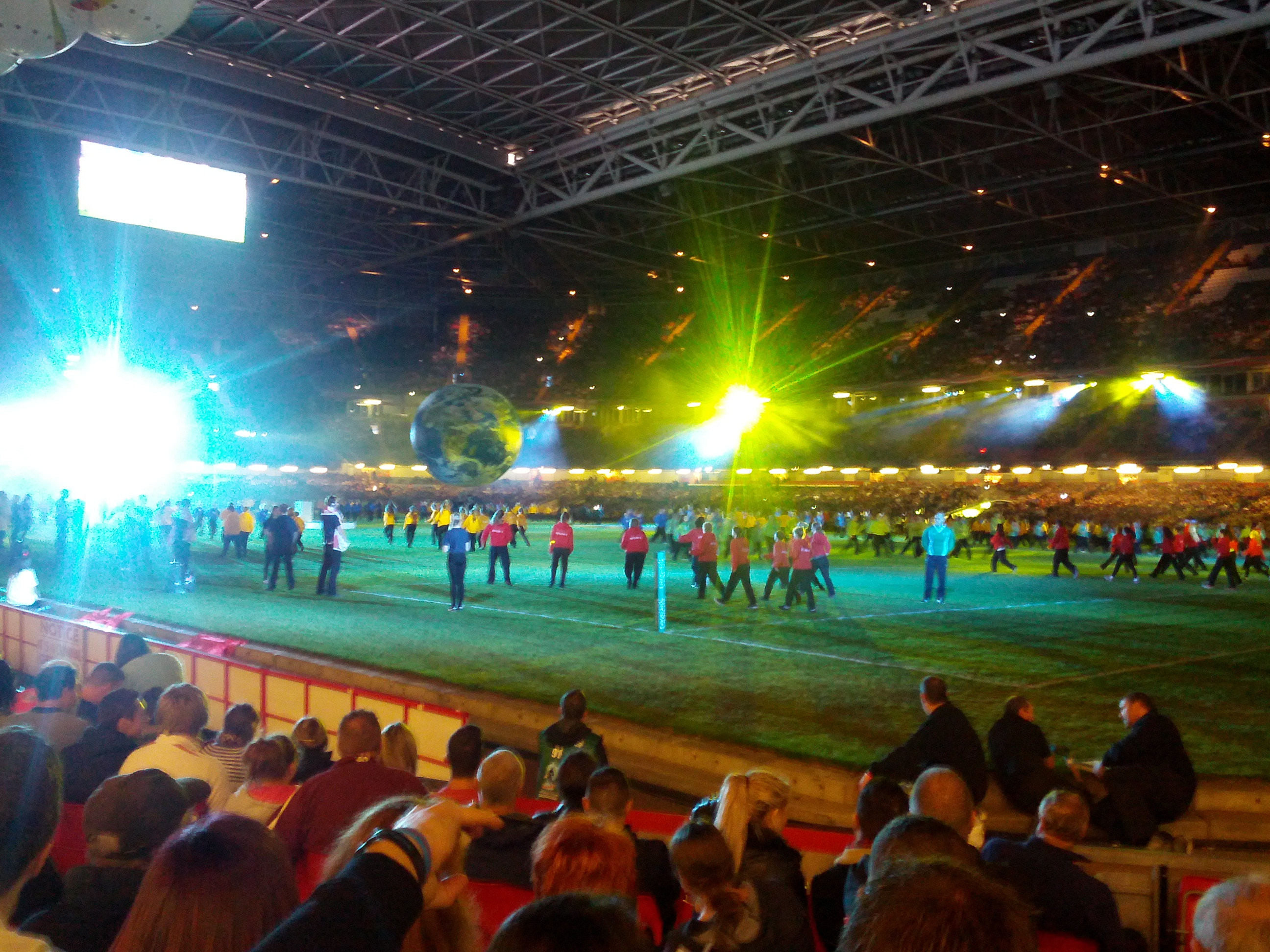
The World Cup's Opening Ceremony

The opening ceremony took place at the Millennium Stadium on 26 October. The ceremony saw 550 dancers perform, 500 amateur and 50 professional, including former players Martin Offiah and Gareth Thomas, both of whom are former Strictly Come Dancing contestants. The ceremony also featured live music and a light show. The ceremony preceded the opening matches of England versus Australia, and Wales versus Italy.

== Group stage ==
The draw, undertaken at the launch of the event in Manchester on 30 November 2010, involved four groups The first two groups were made up of four teams whilst the other two groups feature three teams each. The quarter-final round was made up of the first three teams in the first two groups and the winners of each of the smaller groups. Group play involved a round robin in the larger groups, and a round robin in the smaller groups with an additional inter-group game for each team so all teams played three group games.

Key to colours in group tables
Advances to knockout stage

=== Group A ===
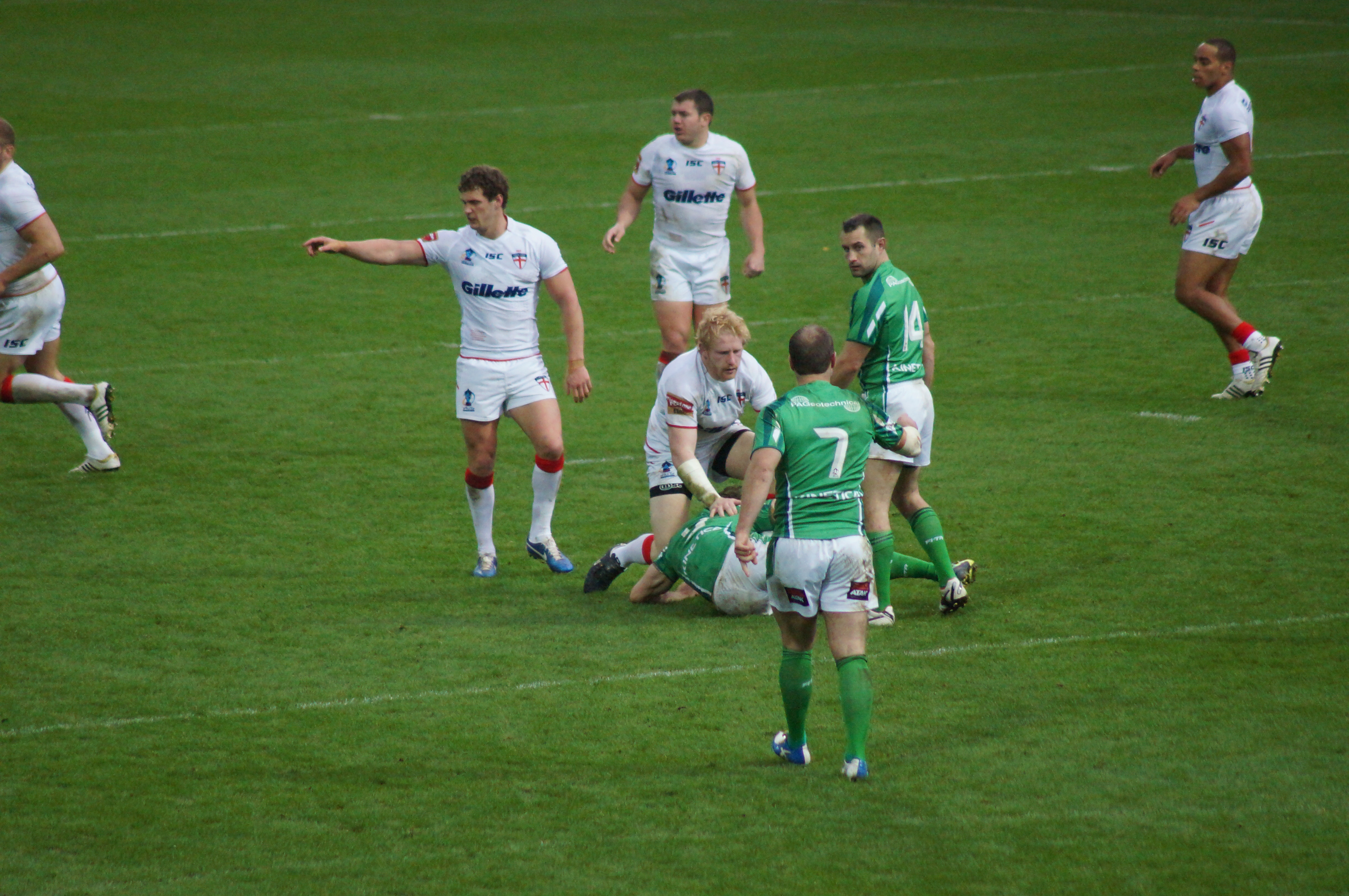
England vs. Ireland, at the John Smith's Stadium, Huddersfield. England won 42–0

Team	Pld	W	D	L	TF	PF	PA	+/−	Pts
Australia	3	3	0	0	20	112	22	+90	6
England	3	2	0	1	18	96	40	+56	4
Fiji	3	1	0	2	8	46	82	–36	2
Ireland	3	0	0	3	3	14	124	–110	0

26 October 2013
14:30

Australia	28–20	England
Try: Thurston 27' c Bird 37' c Slater 40' c B. Morris 44' m Boyd 71' m Goal: Thurston (4/6) 27', 37', 40', 64'	Report	Try: Hall 8' m Cudjoe 20' c G. Burgess 51' c Charnley 76' m Goal: Sinfield (2/4) 20', 51'

Millennium Stadium, Cardiff
Attendance: 45,052
Referee: Henry Perenara (New Zealand)
Player of the Match: Johnathan Thurston (Australia)

28 October 2013
20:00

Fiji	32–14	Ireland
Try: Uate (3) 9' m, 64 m, 71 m K. Naiqama 12' c T. Sims 52' c K. Sims 65' m Goal: W. Naiqama (4/7) 12', 38', 52', 65'	Report	Try: McCarthy 23' m Blanch 76' m Hasson 79' c Goal: Richards (1/3) 80'

Spotland Stadium, Rochdale
Attendance: 8,872
Referee: Phil Bentham (England)
Player of the Match: Kevin Naiqama (Fiji)

2 November 2013
14:30

England	42–0	Ireland
Try: Hall (3) 2' m, 13' c, 22' m Briscoe (2) 17' m, 19' c Ferres 24' c Watkins 57' c Chase 69' c Goal: Sinfield (4/7) 14', 20', 24', 57'; Widdop (1/1) 69'	Report

John Smith's Stadium, Huddersfield
Attendance: 24,375*
Referee: Thierry Alibert (France)
Player of the Match: Ryan Hall (England)

2 November 2013
20:00

Australia	34–2	Fiji
Try: Papalii 15'c Boyd 21' m Jennings 31' c Morris 42' c Cherry-Evans 52' c Lewis 66' c Goal: Thurston (5/6) 15', 31', 42', 52', 67'	Report	Goal: Noilea (1/1) 7'

Langtree Park, St. Helens
Attendance: 14,137
Referee: Richard Silverwood (England)
Player of the Match: Johnathan Thurston (Australia)

9 November 2013
14:30

England	34–12	Fiji
Try: Westwood 38' c S. Burgess 41' c Ferres 44' c Hall (2) 49' c, 56' m Burrow 53' c Goal: Sinfield (5/6) 38', 43', 45', 49', 53'	Report	Try: Vunakece 33' c Radradra 72' c Goal: Naiqama (2/2) 34', 73'

KC Stadium, Hull
Attendance: 25,114
Referee: Ben Cummins (Australia)
Player of the Match: Sam Burgess (England)

9 November 2013
20:00

Australia	50–0	Ireland
Try: Hayne (2) 2' m, 76' c Cronk (2) 11' c, 57' c Bird 29' c Morris 32' c Slater 40' m Cherry-Evans 60' c Fifita 65' c Goal: Smith (3/5) 11', 30', 33'; Parker (4/4) 57', 60', 66', 76'	Report

Thomond Park, Limerick
Attendance: 5,021
Referee: Phil Bentham (England)
Player of the Match: Daly Cherry-Evans

=== Group B ===
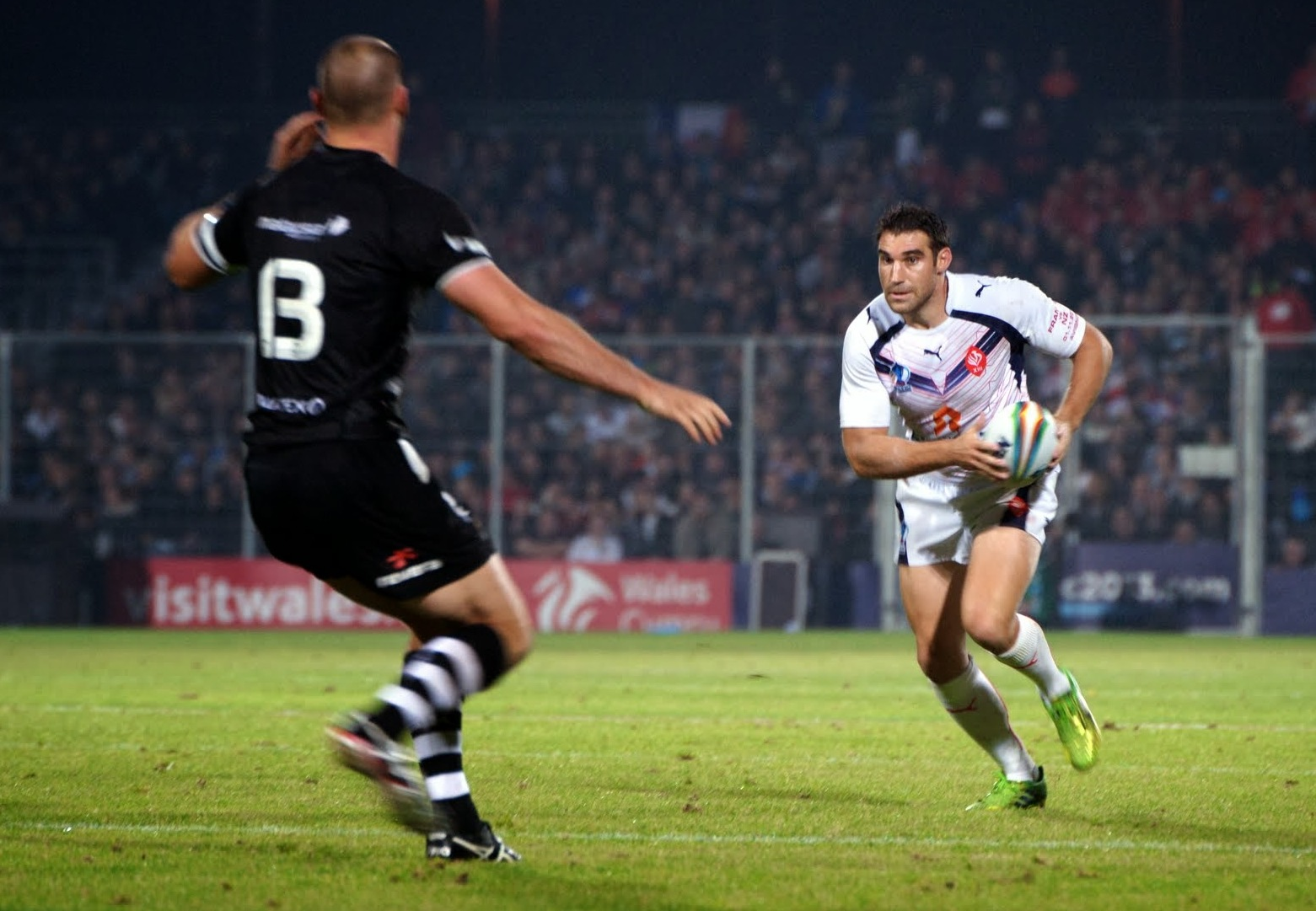
France vs New Zealand at Parc des Sports, Avignon. New Zealand won 48–0.

Team	Pld	W	D	L	TF	PF	PA	+/−	Pts
New Zealand	3	3	0	0	26	146	34	+112	6
Samoa	3	2	0	1	14	84	52	+32	4
France	3	1	0	2	2	15	78	–63	2
Papua New Guinea	3	0	0	3	5	22	103	–81	0

27 October 2013
16:00

Papua New Guinea	8–9	France
Try: MacDonald 17' m Abavu 42' m Goal: Mead (0/3)	Report	Try: Bosc 6' c Goal: Bosc (2/2) 7', 60'; Drop Goal: Barthau (1/1) 64'

MS3 Craven Park, Hull
Attendance: 7,481
Referee: Ben Cummins (Australia)
Player of the Match: William Barthau (France)

27 October 2013
18:00

New Zealand	42–24	Samoa
Try: Hoffman 11' c Mannering (2) 15' c, 22' c Tuivasa-Sheck 17' m Vatuvei (3) 43' m, 49' m, 73' c Luke 45' c Goal: Johnson (5/8) 10', 15', 23', 46', 73'	Report	Try: Roberts 39' m Leilua 52' m Manumalealii 57' m Matagi 60' c A. Winterstein 65' c Goal: Milford (2/5) 61', 65'

Halliwell Jones Stadium, Warrington
Attendance: 14,965
Referee: Richard Silverwood (England)
Player of the Match: Dean Whare (New Zealand)

1 November 2013
20:00

New Zealand	48–0	France
Try: Inu 6' c Goodwin 24' c Nu'uausala (2) 39' c, 75' c Johnson (2) 51' c, 55' c Eastwood 65' c Tuivasa-Sheck 80' c Goal: Johnson (8/8) 7', 26', 39', 51', 56', 66', 76', 80'	Report

Parc des Sports, Avignon
Attendance: 17,518
Referee: Phil Bentham (England)
Player of the Match: Shaun Johnson (New Zealand)

4 November 2013
20:00

Papua New Guinea	4–38	Samoa
Try: Nandye 45' m Goal: Eliab (0/1)	Report	Try: Matagi 2' c A. Winterstein (3) 9' m, 25' c, 79' m Godinet 15' c Roberts 37' c Sue 61' c Goal: Milford (5/7) 2', 15', 25', 38', 61'

MS3 Craven Park, Hull
Attendance: 6,871
Referee: Shayne Hayne (Australia)
Player of the Match: Anthony Milford (Samoa)

8 November 2013
20:00

New Zealand	56–10	Papua New Guinea
Try: Goodwin 4' c Tuivasa-Sheck (2) 7' c, 11' c Williams (3) 15' c, 27' c, 40' c Nu'uausala 30' m Whare (2) 50' c, 56' c Taylor 67' m Goal: Johnson (8/10) 4', 8', 12', 16', 28', 40', 51', 58'	Report	Try: Aiye 41' c Albert 78' m Goal: Paniu (1/2) 43'

Headingley Carnegie Stadium, Leeds
Attendance: 18,180
Referee: Ashley Klein (Australia)
Player of the Match: Sonny Bill Williams (New Zealand)

11 November 2013
20:00

France	6–22	Samoa
Try: Escaré 32' c Goal: Bosc 33'	Report	Try: Vidot 4' c Milford 46' c Godinet 61' m Moors 74' c Goal: Milford (3/4) 4', 47', 75'

Stade Gilbert Brutus, Perpignan
Attendance: 11,576
Referee: Henry Perenara (New Zealand)
Player of the Match: Anthony Milford (Samoa)

=== Group C ===
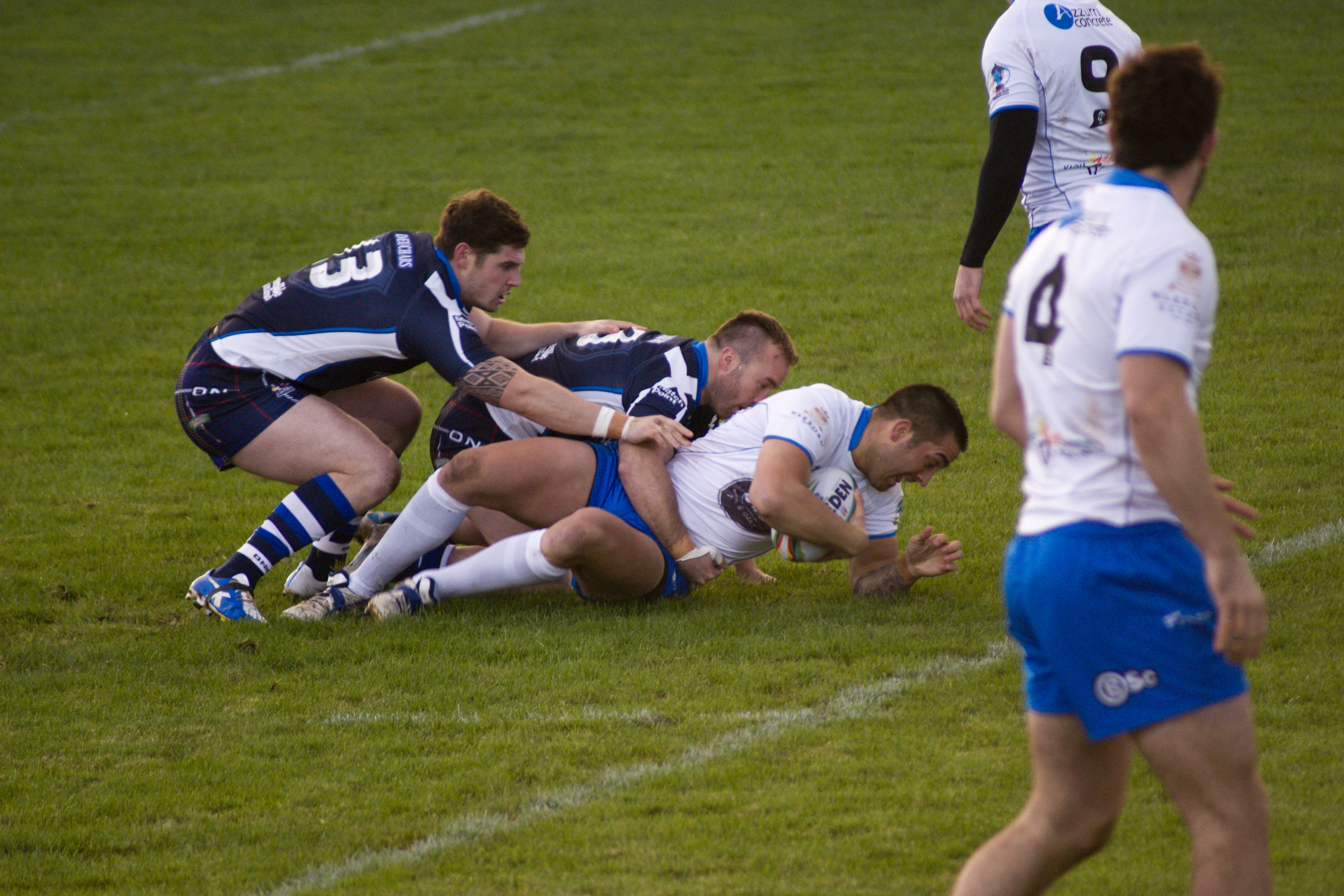
Scotland vs. Italy at Derwent Park, Workington. The game finished 30–30.

Team	Pld	W	D	L	TF	PF	PA	+/−	Pts
Scotland	3	2	1	0	13	78	62	+16	5
Tonga	3	2	0	1	12	62	42	+20	4
Italy	3	1	1	1	11	62	62	0	3

29 October 2013
20:00

Tonga	24–26	Scotland
Try: Fisiiahi 9' m S. Manu (2) 41' c, 56 m Seluini 49' m W. Manu 61' c Goal: Langi (2/5) 43', 62'	Report	Try: Russell (2) 13' c, 72 c Fisher 32' c Carter 38' c Goal: Brough (5/6) 14', 20', 32', 39', 72'

Derwent Park, Workington
Attendance: 7,630
Referee: Shayne Hayne (Australia)
Player of the Match: Sika Manu (Tonga)

3 November 2013
16:00

Scotland	30–30	Italy
Try: Russell 20' c Linnett 25' c Addy 41' c Hellewell (2) 49' c, 69' m Goal: Brough (5/6) 14', 21', 25', 41', 49'	Report	Try: Ciraldo 31' c Nasso (2) 37' c, 45' c Centrone 52' c A. Minichiello 58' c Goal: Mantellato (5/5) 31', 37', 45', 53', 58'

Derwent Park, Workington
Attendance: 7,280
Referee: Henry Perenara (New Zealand)
Player of the Match: Ray Nasso (Italy)

10 November 2013
16:00

Tonga	16–0	Italy
Try: Manu 47' c Foster 64' m Terepo 79' m Goal: Langi (2/3) 40', 48'	Report

The Shay, Halifax
Attendance: 10,266
Referee: Ben Thaler (England)
Player of the Match: Fuifui Moimoi (Tonga)

=== Group D ===
Team	Pld	W	D	L	TF	PF	PA	+/−	Pts
United States	3	2	0	1	13	64	58	+6	4
Cook Islands	3	1	0	2	12	64	78	–14	2
Wales	3	0	0	3	11	56	84	–28	0

30 October 2013
20:00

United States	32–20	Cook Islands
Try: Faraimo 13' m Petersen 16' m Joseph Paulo 42' m Samoa 59' c Offerdahl 71' c Priestley 73' c Goal: Joseph Paulo (4/8) 25', 59', 74', 77'	Report	Try: Takairangi 3' c Low 36' m Lulia 47' m Peyroux 62' c Goal: Rapana (2/4) 4', 63'

Memorial Stadium, Bristol
Attendance: 7,247
Referee: Ben Thaler (England)
Player of the Match: Joseph Paulo (United States)

3 November 2013
14:00

Wales	16–24	United States
Try: Roets 16' m, 75' c Walker 77' c Goal: White (2/3) 76', 78'	Report	Try: Newton (2) 20' m, 63' c Petersen 33' m Paulo 54' m Samoa 60' c Goal: Paulo (2/5) 60', 64'

The Racecourse Ground, Wrexham
Attendance: 8,019
Referee: Ben Cummins (Australia)
Player of the Match: Joseph Paulo (United States)

10 November 2013
14:00

Wales	24–28	Cook Islands
Try: Massam 14' m White 51' c Lloyd 67' c Roets (2) 60' m, 76' m Goal: White (1/3) 52'; Jones (1/2) 68'	Report	Try: Fepuleai 8' c K. Lulia 31' m John 39' c Peyroux 46' c Ford 72' c Goal: Taripo (4/5) 9', 40', 47', 73'

The Gnoll, Neath
Attendance: 3,270
Referee: Richard Silverwood (England)
Player of the Match: Elliot Kear (Wales)

=== Inter-group matches ===
26 October 2013
16:30

Wales	16–32	Italy
Try: B. Evans 15' c Lloyd 38' c Kear 43' m Goal: White (2/3) 15', 38'	Report	Try: Guerra (2) 9' c, 21' c Mantellato 47' m Tedesco 69' m Centrone 71' m M. Minichiello 80' c Goal: Mantellato (4/7) 9', 22', 28', 80'

Millennium Stadium, Cardiff
Attendance: 45,052
Referee: Ashley Klein (Australia)
Player of the Match: Josh Mantellato (Italy)

5 November 2013
20:00

Tonga	22–16	Cook Islands
Try: Fisiiahi 7' c Taumalolo 31' c Hurrell 39' m Taufua 62' m Goal: Langi (3/5) 7, 31', 37'	Report	Try: Taripo (3) 12' c, 19' m, 43' c Goal: Taripo (2/2) 12', 43'; Rapana (0/1)

Leigh Sports Village, Leigh
Attendance: 10,554
Referee: Ashley Klein (Australia)
Player of the Match: Chris Taripo (Cook Islands)

7 November 2013
20:00

Scotland	22–8	United States
Try: Phillips 51' m Russell 55' c Douglas 63' c Hurst 80' c Goal: Brough (3/4) 55', 63', 80'	Report	Try: Freed 8' m Welch 23' m Goal: Paulo (0/2)

Salford City Stadium, Salford
Attendance: 6,041
Referee: Thierry Alibert (France)
Player of the Match: Matty Russell (Scotland)

== Knockout stage ==
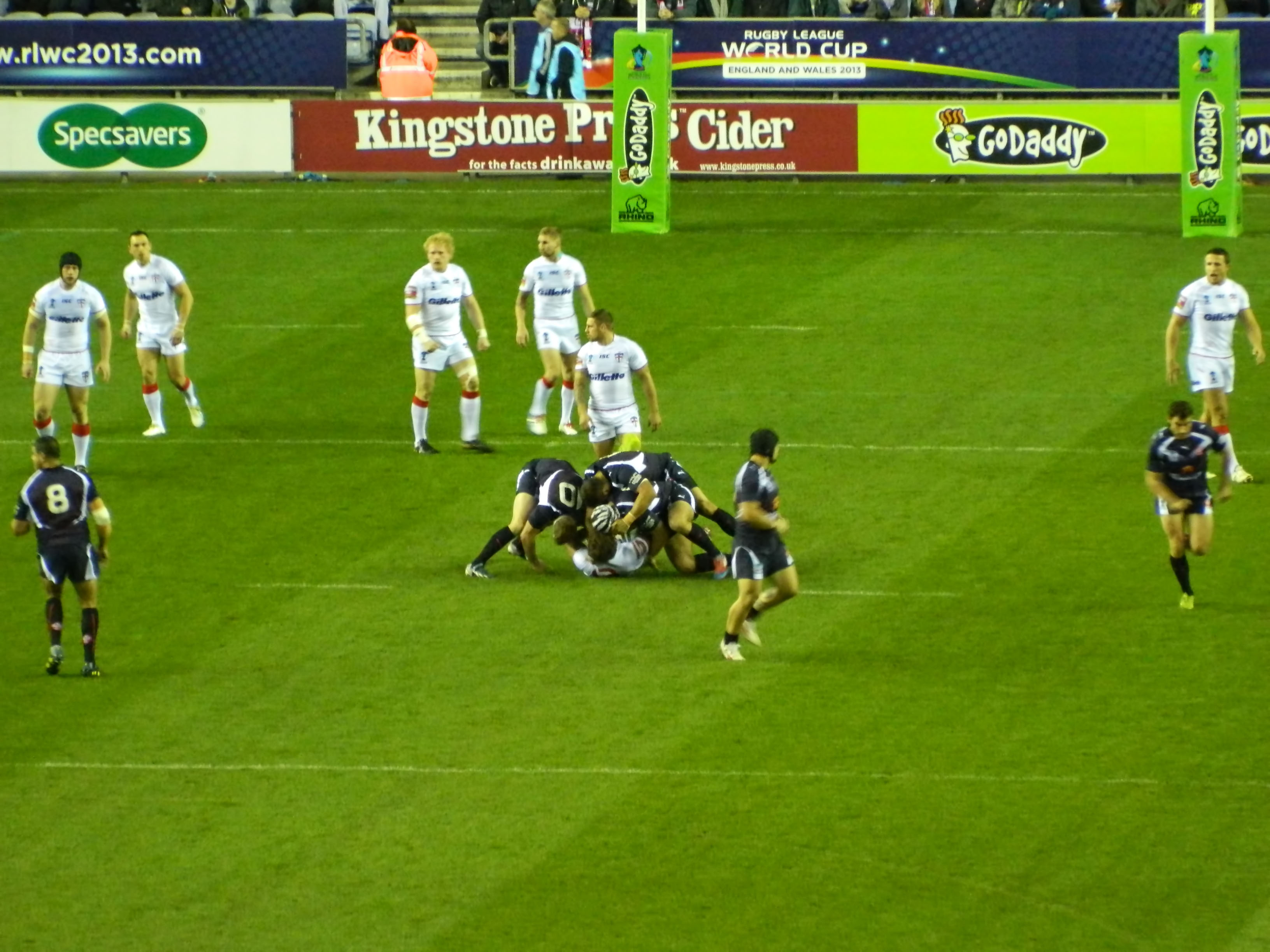
Quarter-final No. 3 England vs. France at the DW Stadium, Wigan. England won 34–6

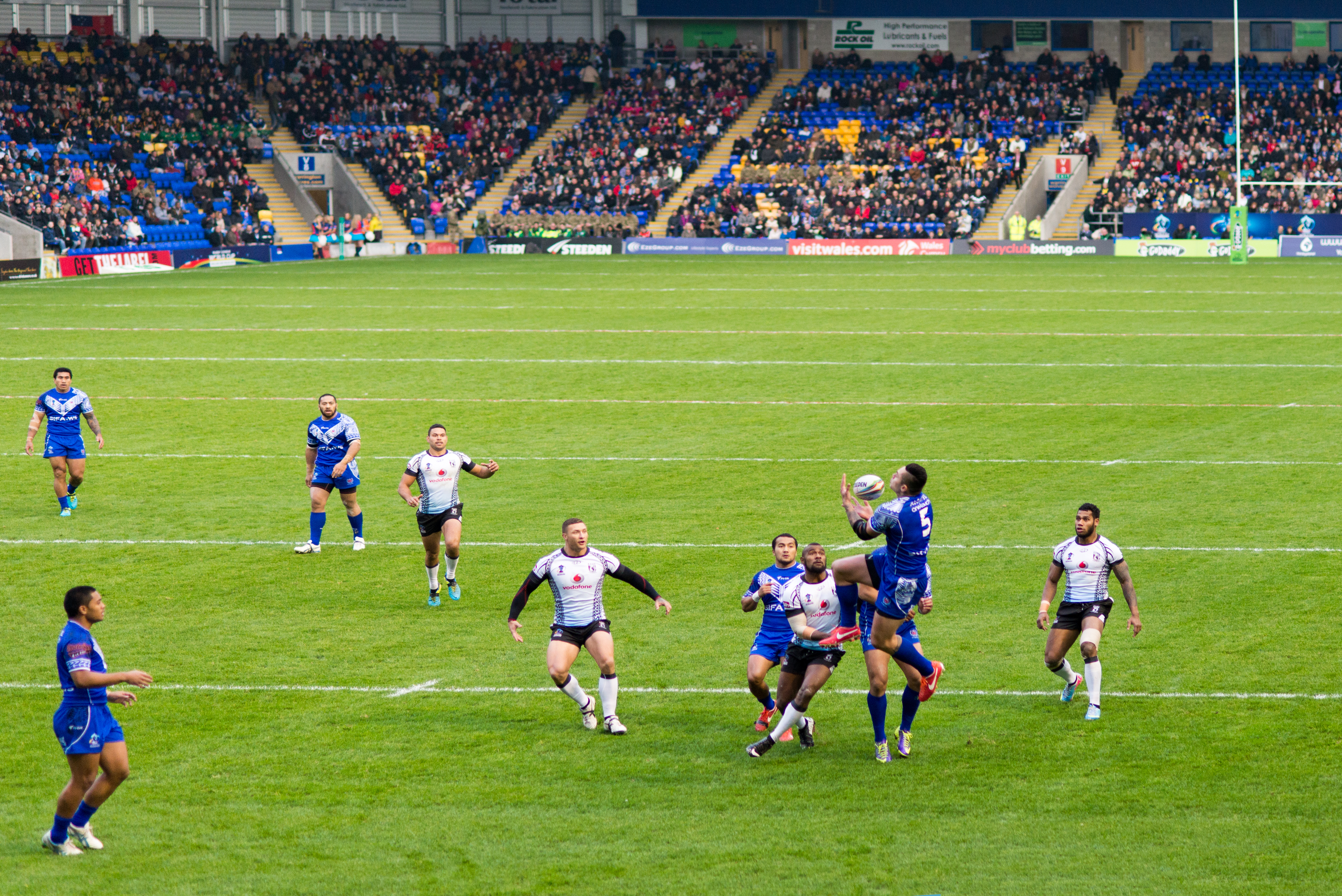
Quarter-final No. 4 Samoa vs. Fiji at the Halliwell Jones Stadium, Wariington. Fiji won 22–4

The quarter-finals followed the group stage, with three teams from each of Groups A and B and one team from each of Groups C and D qualifying.

All times listed below are in Greenwich Mean Time (UTC+0) for English and Welsh venues.

Quarterfinals
A1	Australia	62
D1	United States	0
B2	Samoa	4
A3	Fiji	22
A2	England	34
B3	France	6
B1	New Zealand	40
C1	Scotland	4

Semifinals
A1	Australia	64
A3	Fiji	0
A2	England	18
B1	New Zealand	20

Finals
A1	Australia	34
B1	New Zealand	2

=== Quarter-finals ===
15 November 2013
20:00

New Zealand	40–4	Scotland
Try: Goodwin (2) 8' m, 71' m Bromwich 15' c Tuivasa-Sheck (2) 20' m, 50' c Pritchard 27' c Johnson 30' c Vatuvei 58' m Goal: Johnson (4/8) 17, 28', 31', 51'	Report	Try: Hurst 67' m Goal: Brough (0/1)

Headingley Carnegie Stadium, Leeds
Attendance: 16,207
Referee: Ben Cummins (Australia)
Player of the Match: Roger Tuivasa-Sheck (New Zealand)

16 November 2013
13:00

Australia	62–0	United States
Try: Hayne (4) 3' m, 57' c, 70' c, 79' c Inglis (2) 11' c, 50' c Morris (4) 21' m, 26' m, 35' m, 39' m Smith 23' c Cronk 28' c Goal: Thurston (7/12) 12', 23', 28', 50', 57', 70', 79'	Report

The Racecourse Ground, Wrexham
Attendance: 5,762
Referee: Henry Perenara (New Zealand)
Player of the Match: Brett Morris

16 November 2013
20:00

England	34–6	France
Try: Charnley (2) 11' c, 25' m Hall (2) 18' c, 28' c O'Loughlin 47' c Ferres 77' c Goal: Sinfield (5/6) 11', 18', 28', 47', 77'	Report	Duport 5' c Goal: Bosc (1/1) 5'

DW Stadium, Wigan
Attendance: 22,276
Referee: Ashley Klein (Australia)
Player of the Match: Sam Tomkins

17 November 2013
15:00

Samoa	4–22	Fiji
Try: Winterstein 58' m	Report	Try: Groom 5' c W. Naiqama 32' c Roqica 78' c Goal: W. Naiqama (5/5) 5', 8', 32', 71', 78'

Halliwell Jones Stadium, Warrington
Attendance: 12,766
Referee: Richard Silverwood (England)
Player of the Match: Aaron Groom

=== Semi-finals ===
23 November 2013
13:00

New Zealand	20–18	England
Try: Tuivasa-Sheck (2) 31' c, 44' m Johnson 80' c Goal: Johnson (4/5) 33', 38', 53' 80'	Report	Try: O'Loughlin 16' c Watkins 58' m S. Burgess 67' c Goal: Sinfield (3/4) 17', 25', 68'

Wembley Stadium, London
Attendance: 67,545
Referee: Ben Cummins (Australia)
Player of the Match: Sam Burgess

23 November 2013
15:30

Australia	64–0	Fiji
Try: Thurston 9' c Darius Boyd (2) 15' m, 59' c Cronk 19' c Hayne (3) 22' c, 37' c, 68' c Papalii 35'c Tamou 53' c Morris 72' c Fifita 79' c Goal: Thurston (10/11) 10', 20', 23', 36', 39', 55', 60', 69', 73', 80'	Report

Wembley Stadium, London
Attendance: 67,545
Referee: Richard Silverwood (England)
Player of the Match: Johnathan Thurston

=== Final ===
30 November 2013
14:30

New Zealand	2–34	Australia
Tries: Goals: Shaun Johnson (1/1) 16'	Report	Tries: Billy Slater (2) 19' c, 41' c Cooper Cronk 30' c Brett Morris (2) 52' c, 72' c Goals: Johnathan Thurston (7/7) 4', 19', 30', 35', 41', 52', 72'

Old Trafford, Manchester
Attendance: 74,468
Referee: Richard Silverwood (England)
Player of the Match: Johnathan Thurston (Australia)

== Try scorers ==
9 tries

- (Australia) Brett Morris
- (Australia) Jarryd Hayne

8 tries

- (England) Ryan Hall
- (New Zealand) Roger Tuivasa-Sheck

5 tries

- (Australia) Cooper Cronk
- (Samoa) Antonio Winterstein

4 tries

- (Australia) Darius Boyd
- (Australia) Billy Slater
- (New Zealand) Bryson Goodwin
- (New Zealand) Shaun Johnson
- (New Zealand) Manu Vatuvei
- (Scotland) Matty Russell
- (Wales) Christiaan Roets

3 tries

- (Cook Islands) Chris Taripo
- (England) Josh Charnley
- (England) Brett Ferres
- (Fiji) Akuila Uate
- (New Zealand) Sonny Bill Williams

2 tries

- (Australia) Greg Bird
- (Australia) Daly Cherry-Evans
- (Australia) Andrew Fifita
- (Australia) Greg Inglis
- (Australia) Josh Papalii
- (Australia) Johnathan Thurston
- (Cook Islands) Dominique Peyroux
- (England) Tom Briscoe
- (England) Sam Burgess
- (England) Sean O'Loughlin
- (England) Kallum Watkins
- (Italy) Chris Centrone
- (Italy) Aidan Guerra
- (Italy) Ray Nasso
- (New Zealand) Simon Mannering
- (New Zealand) Frank-Paul Nu'uausala
- (New Zealand) Dean Whare
- (Samoa) Suaia Matagi
- (Samoa) Ben Roberts
- (Samoa) Pita Godinet
- (Scotland) Alex Hurst
- (Scotland) Ben Hellewell
- (Tonga) Glen Fisiiahi
- (Tonga) Sika Manu
- (Tonga) Willie Manu
- (United States) Clint Newton
- (United States) Joseph Paulo
- (United States) Matt Petersen
- (United States) Tui Samoa
- (Wales) Rhodri Lloyd

1 try

- (Australia) Michael Jennings
- (Australia) Luke Lewis
- (Australia) Josh Morris
- (Australia) Cameron Smith
- (Cook Islands) Daniel Fepuleai
- (Cook Islands) Jonathan Ford
- (Cook Islands) Isaac John
- (Cook Islands) Drury Low
- (Cook Islands) Keith Lulia
- (Cook Islands) Lulia Lulia
- (Cook Islands) Brad Takairangi
- (England) George Burgess
- (England) Rob Burrow
- (England) Rangi Chase
- (England) Leroy Cudjoe
- (England) Ben Westwood
- (France) Thomas Bosc
- (France) Vincent Duport
- (France) Morgan Escare
- (Fiji) Aaron Groom
- (Fiji) Kevin Naiqama
- (Fiji) Wes Naiqama
- (Fiji) Semi Radradra
- (Fiji) Vitale Junior Roqica
- (Fiji) Korbin Sims
- (Fiji) Tariq Sims
- (Fiji) Eloni Vunakece
- (Ireland) Damien Blanch
- (Ireland) James Hasson
- (Ireland) Tyrone McCarthy
- (Italy) Cameron Ciraldo
- (Italy) Josh Mantellato
- (Italy) Anthony Minichiello
- (Italy) Mark Minichiello
- (Italy) James Tedesco
- (New Zealand) Jesse Bromwich
- (New Zealand) Greg Eastwood
- (New Zealand) Josh Hoffman
- (New Zealand) Krisnan Inu
- (New Zealand) Isaac Luke
- (New Zealand) Frank Pritchard
- (New Zealand) Elijah Taylor
- (Papua New Guinea) Josiah Abavu
- (Papua New Guinea) Dion Aiye
- (Papua New Guinea) Wellington Albert
- (Papua New Guinea) Nene MacDonald
- (Papua New Guinea) Jessie Joe Parker
- (Samoa) Joseph Leilua
- (Samoa) Penani Manumeasili
- (Samoa) Anthony Milford
- (Samoa) Junior Moors
- (Samoa) Sauaso Sue
- (Samoa) Daniel Vidot
- (Scotland) Danny Addy
- (Scotland) Brett Carter
- (Scotland) Luke Douglas
- (Scotland) Ben Fisher
- (Scotland) Kane Linnett
- (Scotland) Brett Phillips
- (Tonga) Daniel Foster
- (Tonga) Konrad Hurrell
- (Tonga) Nafe Seluini
- (Tonga) Jorge Taufua
- (Tonga) Jason Taumalolo
- (Tonga) Peni Terepo
- (United States) Bureta Faraimo
- (United States) Kristian Freed
- (United States) Mark Offerdahl
- (United States) Craig Priestley
- (United States) Taylor Welch
- (Wales) Ben Evans
- (Wales) Elliot Kear
- (Wales) Lloyd White
- (Wales) Rob Massam
- (Wales) Anthony Walker

== Attendances ==
Seven grounds achieved sell-out crowds, with four setting stadium records. Games held in both Wales and Ireland were watched by the biggest crowds ever for rugby league internationals in those countries. The final was played in front of the largest crowd ever to attend an international rugby league fixture.

Date	Teams		Venue	Location	Attendance
26 October 2013	Australia	England	Millennium Stadium	Cardiff	45,052
26 October 2013	Wales	Italy	Millennium Stadium	Cardiff	45,052
27 October 2013	Papua New Guinea	France	Craven Park	Hull	7,481
27 October 2013	New Zealand	Samoa	Halliwell Jones Stadium	Warrington	14,965
28 October 2013	Fiji	Ireland	Spotland	Rochdale	8,872
29 October 2013	Tonga	Scotland	Derwent Park	Workington	7,630
30 October 2013	United States	Cook Islands	Memorial Stadium	Bristol	7,247
1 November 2013	New Zealand	France	Parc des Sports	Avignon	17,158
2 November 2013	England	Ireland	John Smith's Stadium	Huddersfield	24,375
2 November 2013	Australia	Fiji	Langtree Park	St. Helens	14,137
3 November 2013	Wales	United States	Racecourse Ground	Wrexham	8,019
3 November 2013	Scotland	Italy	Derwent Park	Workington	7,280
4 November 2013	Papua New Guinea	Samoa	Craven Park	Hull	6,871
5 November 2013	Tonga	Cook Islands	Leigh Sports Village	Leigh	10,554
7 November 2013	Scotland	United States	AJ Bell Stadium	Eccles	6,041
8 November 2013	New Zealand	Papua New Guinea	Headingley	Leeds	18,180
9 November 2013	England	Fiji	KC Stadium	Hull	25,114
9 November 2013	Australia	Ireland	Thomond Park	Limerick	5,021
10 November 2013	Wales	Cook Islands	The Gnoll	Neath	3,720
10 November 2013	Tonga	Italy	The Shay	Halifax	10,226
11 November 2013	France	Samoa	Stade Gilbert Brutus	Perpignan	11,576
15 November 2013	New Zealand	Scotland	Headingley	Leeds	16,207
16 November 2013	Australia	United States	Racecourse Ground	Wrexham	5,762
16 November 2013	England	France	DW Stadium	Wigan	22,276
17 November 2013	Samoa	Fiji	Halliwell Jones Stadium	Warrington	12,776
23 November 2013	New Zealand	England	Wembley	London	67,545
23 November 2013	Australia	Fiji	Wembley	London	67,545
30 November 2013	Australia	New Zealand	Old Trafford	Trafford	74,468

== Broadcasting ==
Country	Channel televising all matches
Australia	7mate
France	beIN Sport
Ireland	Setanta Sports 1
North Africa and the Middle East	OSN
New Zealand	Sky Sport
Papua New Guinea	EM TV
United Kingdom	Premier Sports*

* The BBC and Premier Sports jointly televised seven live matches with the remaining 21 live matches exclusive to Premier Sports. The jointly live matches were England's Group A matches (BBC One), an inter-group match between Wales and Italy and a quarter-final (both on BBC Two), a semi-final and the final (both on BBC One). The jointly televised quarter-final and semi-final involved England.

== See also ==
- 2015 Rugby World Cup - rugby union version of the Men's Rugby World Cup also held in England and Wales
