= 2013 Rugby League World Cup final =

New Zealand	Australia
(NZRL)	(ARL)
2	34
	1	2	Total
NZL	2	0	2
AUS	16	18	34
- Date: 30 November 2013
- Stadium: Old Trafford
- Location: Trafford, Manchester
- Man of the Match: Johnathan Thurston (Australia)
- Referee: Richard Silverwood (England)
- Attendance: 74,468

Broadcast partners
- Broadcasters: BBC and Premier Sports (United Kingdom) Setanta Sports 1 (Ireland) beIN Sport (France) 7mate (Australia) Sky Sport (New Zealand) OSN (North Africa & Middle East)
- Commentators: Andrew Voss Daryl Halligan

The 2013 Rugby League World Cup final was the conclusive game of the 2013 Rugby League World Cup tournament and was played between New Zealand and Australia on 30 November 2013 at Old Trafford, Manchester, England. Australia won the final by 34 points to 2 in front of a sell-out crowd, finishing the tournament undefeated. They reclaimed the cup from New Zealand, who had defeated them in the 2008 final. The Kangaroos won the Rugby League World Cup for the tenth time, and the first time since 2000. Their five-eighth, Johnathan Thurston was named man-of-the-match.

The sellout crowd of 74,468 at Old Trafford set a new international rugby league attendance record, eclipsing the previous record of 73,361 established at the 1992 Rugby League World Cup final where Australia defeated Great Britain 10-6 at the old Wembley Stadium.

== Background ==
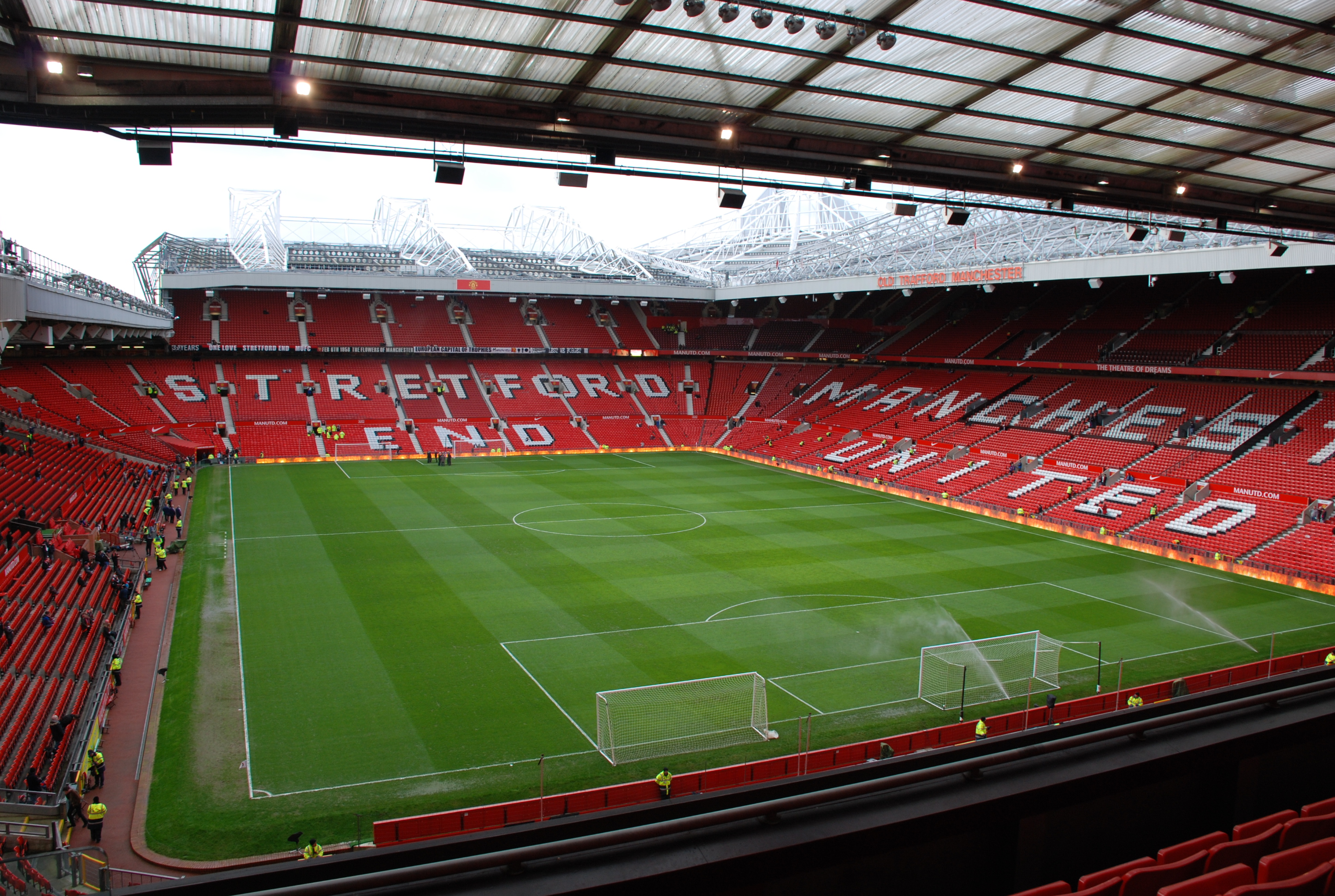
Old Trafford in Manchester hosted its second World Cup final

=== New Zealand ===
New Zealand's road to the final started on 27 October at the Halliwell Jones Stadium in Warrington, where they played Samoa, who were knocked out in the quarter-final stage. New Zealand stormed the match with 8 tries to earn a 42-24 victory. New Zealand then found themselves playing the co-hosts France at the Parc des Sports in Avignon. In front of a sold out capacity crowd, New Zealand kept the hosts to zero points, while New Zealand scored 8 tries to win 48-0. The Kiwis returned to England to play Papua New Guinea, who had failed to win a single match in the run up the New Zealand game. New Zealand continued their Group B dominance and scored 10 tries to earn a 56-10 victory to top the group and advance to the knock out stage.

New Zealand faced Scotland in the quarter-final, who like New Zealand hadn't lost a single game in the Group stage but did at worst draw 30 all against Italy. New Zealand was victorious in the quarter-final match running in 8 tries to 1 to win 40–4. In a hard-fought semi-final, New Zealand won 20–18 against hosts England. The home side were leading for most of the first half, up 8-0, 25 minutes into the match. A try from Roger Tuivasa-Sheck and 2 goals from Shaun Johnson meant 8 all was the half time score. New Zealand looked to start to dominate the match with a second 44th minute try from Tuivasa-Sheck for the Kiwis to lead 12-8. Tries from England's Kallum Watkins and Sam Burgess meant with just 10 minutes to go, England were in front 14-18. A last gasp try on the 80th minute for New Zealand, could at least take the semi-final to over time should Johnson not be able to convert his own try. Unfortunately for the hosts, Johnson bisected the posts to take the Kiwis their third final, and keep them with in the chance to defend their title. In reaching the 2013 World Cup final, New Zealand had again equalled their record for consecutive victories with five.

==== Results ====
Opposing Team	For	Against	Date	Venue	Attendance	Stage
Samoa	42	24	27 October 2013	Halliwell Jones Stadium, Warrington	14,965	Group Stage
France	48	0	1 November 2013	Parc des Sports, Avignon	17,518	Group Stage
Papua New Guinea	56	10	8 November 2013	Headingley Carnegie Stadium, Leeds	18,180	Group Stage
Scotland	40	4	15 November 2013	Headingley Carnegie Stadium, Leeds	16,207	Quarter-final
England	20	18	23 November 2013	Wembley Stadium, London	67,545	Semi-final

=== Australia ===
Australia's road to the final started on the opening day of the tournament at the Millennium Stadium in Cardiff against hosts England. Australia ran in 5 tries to England's 4 to earn a hard-fought 28-20 victory under the roof in Cardiff. Australia then played Fiji, who had opened their tournament with a 32–14 win over Ireland, at Langtree Park in St. Helens, but lost second rower Luke Lewis with a shoulder injury during the game. Lewis had collided with the advertising boards that were located close to the dead-ball line raising concerns about player safety. His injury would keep him out of football until mid-2014. Most of the safety concerns came from the use of soccer stadiums which generally have a shorter pitch length than desirable for a rugby league field (soccer pitches are 105 metres in length while the minimum length for a league field between the dead ball lines is 112 metres) which often led to shorter than regulation fields and left very little room between the dead ball lines and the fence. However, Langtree Park is actually a rugby league ground being the home venue of the famous St Helens club.

The Kangaroos were victorious in this match, winning 34-2 with 6 tries to nil. Thomond Park in Limerick was the venue for Australia's final match of the group stage against Ireland. Ireland hadn't won any matches in the run up this final match, only scoring 14 points in 2 games which came against Fiji (0 against England). With Australia's 9 tries, including 24 points in 10 minutes, Australia went out victors 50-0. With Australia's 3 from 3 wins in the group stage and the conceding of only 22 points, Australia topped Group A and advanced to the knock out stage.

In the quarter-final, Australia played surprise packet newcomers United States at The Racecourse Ground in Wrexham. The Hawks had played well to reach the finals, but were not expected to be a match for the tournament favourites. Australia were the victors 62-0 scoring 12 tries, including 4 from Jarryd Hayne playing in the unfamiliar position of centre, and 4 from Man of the Match Brett Morris. Australia played Fiji in the semi-final, a replay of the Group A match that happened on 2 November (28 days earlier). This time, Australia kept Fiji scoreless, running in 11 tries to win 64-0, which including a 22 points in 10 minutes. Australia therefore advanced to the final for the 10th time in a row.

==== Results ====
Opposing Team	For	Against	Date	Venue	Attendance	Stage
England	28	20	26 October 2013	Millennium Stadium, Cardiff	45,052	Group Stage
Fiji	34	2	2 November 2013	Langtree Park, St. Helens	14,137	Group Stage
Ireland	50	0	9 November 2013	Thomond Park, Limerick	5,021	Group Stage
United States	62	0	16 November 2013	The Racecourse Ground, Wrexham	5,762	Quarter-final
Fiji	64	0	23 November 2013	Wembley Stadium, London	67,545	Semi-final

=== Head to Head ===
Before the final, Australia and New Zealand had played each other 125 times, with Australia winning 95 times, New Zealand 27 and 3 draws. Of the last 10 encounters, Australia had won 8 of them, New Zealand 1 and a single draw. New Zealand's last win over the Kangaroos was a hard-fought 16-12 win in the 2010 Four Nations Final at Suncorp Stadium in Brisbane. Their previous meeting was in April 2013 for the 2013 ANZAC Test, where Australia won 32-12 at the Canberra Stadium in Australia's capital city. The two teams had previously met each other on 17 occasions in a Rugby League World Cup match, with Australia winning 15 to New Zealand's 2.

Australia and New Zealand had met in three previous World Cup finals; 1988 at Eden Park in Auckland (won 25-12 by Australia), 2000 at Old Trafford (won 40-12 by Australia), and 2008. The 2008 Rugby League World Cup final at Brisbane's Suncorp Stadium was won 34-20 by New Zealand. It was the first time New Zealand had won the World Cup, and the first time Australia had lost it World Champions crown since Great Britain had won in 1972.

In the run up to the 2013 Rugby League World Cup final, Australia had only conceded 22 points, and let though 4 tries, while scoring 238 points and crossing the line 43 times; 20 Group stage, 12 quarter-final and 11 Semi-final. New Zealand, however, had conceded 56 points and let through 11 tries, while scoring 206 points and attacking their opponent with 37 tries; 26 Group stage, 1 quarter-final and 3 semi-final.

== Pre-match ==
=== Officiating ===
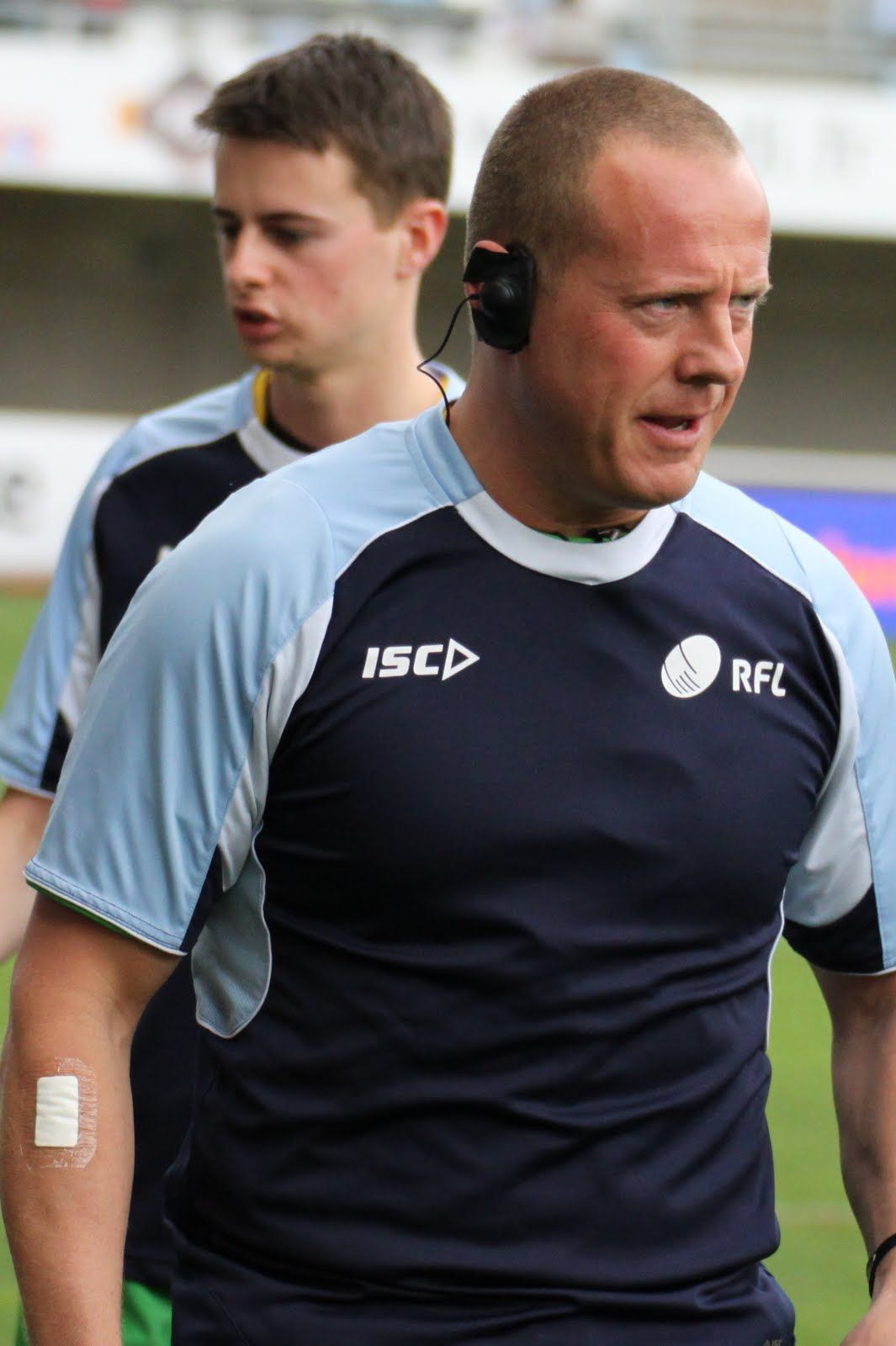
Richard Silverwood officiated the final.

English referee Richard Silverwood was named to officiate the final, with James Child and Grant Atkins the touch judges. Ashley Klein, who formerly officiated as a part of the Rugby Football League was the video referee for the match.

=== Safety concerns ===
Although it had hosted 7 international matches since first being used in 1986 (including the 2000 World Cup final), and was the host venue of the annual Super League Grand Final, prior to the game, concerns were raised by the Australian team management about the safety and suitability of Old Trafford as a rugby league venue, primarily the shorter than regulation in-goal areas (measured at 4.1 metres, shorter than the minimum allowable distance of 6 metres) and the slope around the perimeter of the field. There were some suggestions of moving the game to Wembley Stadium in London, though this was ruled out by tournament organisers citing logistical and financial reasons. Two players, Brett Morris and Manu Vatuvei, fell victim to falling down the slope with Morris actually colliding with the advertising boards at the bottom of the slope after scoring a try while Vatuvei fell awkwardly on concrete, only emphasised the questions raised.

== Match ==
=== First half ===
After Australia kicked off, a New Zealand error in the first set of the game led to an early opportunity and field position for Australia, and the penalty was kicked by Johnathan Thurston to open the scoring to 2–0. The Kiwis suffered an early blow when after just one touch of the ball, Roger Tuivasa-Sheck had a recurrence of an ankle injury that forced him from the field after just 8 minutes with second rower Alex Glenn his replacement, forcing a re-shuffle with Simon Mannering moving to the centres and Dean Whare to the wing. Australia weren't without their problems though as soon after Jarryd Hayne went down with an apparent concussion after colliding with the hip of Simon Mannering while tackling the Kiwi captain, though the Kangaroos centre would remain on the field. Further play from the Kiwis brought them into the Australian half of the field, and a holding penalty then given by the Australians was kicked by Shaun Johnson to level the score to 2–2 at the 16 minute mark. Despite Old Trafford having an in-goal area of just 4.1m, Australia were able to force a line drop-out. From this, Thurston was able to kick to Billy Slater, setting up the first four-pointer which Thurston also converted to make the score 8–2. A try attempt by Cooper Cronk was controversially disallowed by the video referee, who ruled Isaac Luke had been able to stop the ball coming into contact with the in-goal grass while also giving New Zealand a penalty against Andrew Fifita for 'driving' Luke. Cronk didn't have to wait long to score though, as a few minutes later Darius Boyd got around Whare and raced down the wing before putting in a miss-kicked grubber which Cronk managed to find to go over and score despite a desperate Kevin Locke tackle. Thurston kicked his 3rd goal from 3 attempts to take the score out to 14–2. Thurston's conversion of Cronk's try saw him overtake Michael Cronin as Australia's highest point scorer in test match football. Manu Vatuvei's attacking run for New Zealand saw him pushed over the sideline 5 metres out by 5 desperate Australian defenders, and an offside penalty at the 35 minute mark gave Thurston another kick to bring the score out to 16–2 at halftime.

=== Second half ===
Billy Slater opened the scoring on the first set of the second half, thanks to break by captain Cameron Smith who passed outside to Thurston who found Darius Boyd who raced down the sideline and found Slater in support as Kiwi fullback Kevin Locke loomed in defence. This gave Thurston another chance to convert and bring the score to 22–2. A charge-down by Ben Matulino and regather from Sonny Bill Williams led to New Zealand beginning attack at halfway. More potential attack from the Kiwis was defused easily by the Australians, until a New Zealand grubber gave possession back to the Australians. A flick offload from Josh Papalii led to a chip kick from Brett Morris, regathered and then re-kicked by Jarryd Hayne led to a sliding Morris try. A conversion by Thurston brought the score out to 28–2. Both teams were having issues with the geography of the ground, as Morris collided with the signage during his try and a flying Manu Vatuvei landed awkwardly on the concrete surrounding the field. Australia's control of the game led to the New Zealanders forced into defense of their own line, defusing Australia's attack but not managing any successful attack of their own. A near 100 metre try by Morris, thanks to a 70-metre intercept run by Hayne, and conversion by Thurston made the score 34–2 with eight minutes to go.

=== Details ===
30 November 2013
14:30 GMT (UTC±00:00)

New Zealand	2–34	Australia
Goals: Johnson (1/1) 16' pen		Tries: Billy Slater (2) 19', 41'; Cooper Cronk 30'; Brett Morris (2) 52', 72'; Goals: Johnathan Thurston (7/7) 4' pen, 20', 31', 35' pen, 42', 53', 73'

Old Trafford, Manchester
Attendance: 74,468
Referee: Richard Silverwood (England)
Touch judges: James Child (England) , Grant Atkins (Australia)
Player of the Match: Johnathan Thurston

New Zealand	Australia

FB	1	Kevin Locke
RW	2	Roger Tuivasa-Sheck
LC	3	Dean Whare
RC	4	Bryson Goodwin
LW	5	Manu Vatuvei
SO	6	Kieran Foran
SH	7	Shaun Johnson
PR	8	Jared Waerea-Hargreaves
HK	9	Isaac Luke
PR	10	Jesse Bromwich
SR	11	Simon Mannering (c)
SR	12	Sonny Bill Williams
LF	13	Elijah Taylor
Substitutions:
IC	14	Frank-Paul Nu'uausala
IC	15	Sam Kasiano
IC	16	Ben Matulino
IC	17	Alex Glenn
Coach:
(New Zealand) Stephen Kearney

FB	1	Billy Slater
RW	2	Brett Morris
RC	3	Greg Inglis
LC	4	Jarryd Hayne
LW	5	Darius Boyd
SO	6	Johnathan Thurston
SH	7	Cooper Cronk
PR	8	Matt Scott
HK	9	Cameron Smith (c)
PR	10	James Tamou
SR	11	Greg Bird
SR	12	Sam Thaiday
LF	13	Paul Gallen
Substitutions:
IC	14	Daly Cherry-Evans
IC	15	Josh Papalii
IC	16	Andrew Fifita
IC	17	Corey Parker
Coach:
(Australia) Tim Sheens

== Post-match ==
Australian scrum half back Johnathan Thurston was named the final's man-of-the-match, his fourth such award of the tournament. His conversion of Cronk's first half try also broke Mick Cronin's 31-year-old record of 309 Test points for the Kangaroos. The 32-point margin set a new record for heaviest victory in a final, eclipsing Australia's 40–12 victory over the Kiwis in the same stadium in 2000.
