= 2016 Super League season results =

Rugby league competition results

Super League XXI commenced on 4 February 2016 and ended on 8 October with the Super League Grand Final. It consisted of 23 regular season games, 9 rounds of relevant play-offs which included the Grand Final. Wigan Warriors are the current champions after successfully defeating Warrington Wolves 12–6 in front of a capacity crowd of 70,202 at Old Trafford.

== Regular season ==
=== Round 1 ===
Home	Score	Away	Match information
Home	Score	Away	Date and time	Venue	Referee	Attendance
Leeds Rhinos	10–12	Warrington Wolves	4 February 20:00 GMT	Headingley Carnegie Stadium	James Child	16,168
Hull F.C.	42–20	Salford Red Devils	5 February 20:00 GMT	KC Stadium	Chris Kendall	12,265
St. Helens	30–16	Huddersfield Giants	5 February 20:00 GMT	Langtree Park	Robert Hicks	10,408
Wigan Warriors	12–6	Catalans Dragons	5 February 20:00 GMT	DW Stadium	Ben Thaler	13,436
Hull Kingston Rovers	16–16	Castleford Tigers	7 February 15:00 GMT	KC Lightstream Stadium	Richard Silverwood	11,011
Wakefield Trinity Wildcats	16–24	Widnes Vikings	7 February 15:00 GMT	Belle Vue	Phil Bentham	5,240

=== Round 2 ===
Home	Score	Away	Match information
Home	Score	Away	Date and time	Venue	Referee	Attendance
Salford Red Devils	44–10	St. Helens	11 February 2016 20:00 GMT	AJ Bell Stadium	Richard Silverwood	4,386
Huddersfield Giants	13–18	Wigan Warriors	12 February 2016 20:00 GMT	John Smiths Stadium	Phil Bentham	5,912
Catalans Dragons	10–38	Hull F.C.	13 February 2016 17:00 GMT	Stade Gilbert Brutus	Robert Hicks	10,234
Warrington Wolves	38–8	Hull Kingston Rovers	14 February 2016 15:00 GMT	Halliwell Jones Stadium	Ben Thaler	11,037
Widnes Vikings	56–12	Leeds Rhinos	14 February 2016 15:00 GMT	Select Security Stadium	George Stokes	6,596
Castleford Tigers	40–6	Wakefield Trinity Wildcats	14 February 2016 15:30 GMT	The Jungle	James Child	9,761

=== Catch up Round 11 ===
This round is played by the teams entering the Challenge Cup in the 5th Round draw which will be played during Round 11.

Home	Score	Away	Match information
Home	Score	Away	Date and time	Venue	Referee	Attendance
Hull Kingston Rovers	12–14	Wakefield Trinity Wildcats	21 February 2016 15:00 GMT	Craven Park	Robert Hicks	7,207
Salford Red Devils	28–20	Widnes Vikings	21 February 2016 15:00 GMT	AJ Bell Stadium	Phil Bentham	5,089

=== Round 3 ===
Home	Score	Away	Match information
Home	Score	Away	Date and time	Venue	Referee	Attendance
Hull F.C.	24–31	Castleford Tigers	25 February 2016 20:00 GMT	KC Stadium	Robert Hicks	10,247
Wigan Warriors	20–16	Salford Red Devils	25 February 2016 20:00 GMT	DW Stadium	George Stokes	10,897
Hull Kingston Rovers	22–31	St Helens R.F.C.	26 February 2016 20:00 GMT	Craven Park	Phil Bentham	6,517
Warrington Wolves	34–16	Wakefield Trinity Wildcats	26 February 2016 20:00 GMT	Halliwell Jones Stadium	Richard Silverwood	10,631
Catalans Dragons	32–28	Leeds Rhinos	27 February 2016 17:00 GMT	Stade Gilbert Brutus	Ben Thaler	8,178
Huddersfield Giants	18–36	Widnes Vikings	28 February 2016 15:00 GMT	John Smiths Stadium	James Child	5,183

=== Round 4 ===
Home	Score	Away	Match information
Home	Score	Away	Date and time	Venue	Referee	Attendance
Salford Red Devils	30–31	Warrington Wolves	3 March 2016 20:00	AJ Bell Stadium	Robert Hicks	4,381
Widnes Vikings	30–16	Hull Kingston Rovers	4 March 2016 20:00	Select Security Stadium	Gareth Hewer	5,013
St. Helens	28–22	Castleford Tigers	4 March 2016 20:00	Langtree Park	James Child	11,298
Hull F.C.	25–26	Wigan Warriors	4 March 2016 20:00	KC Stadium	Ben Thaler	10,660
Leeds Rhinos	20–16	Huddersfield Giants	4 March 2016 20:00	Headingley Stadium	Richard Silverwood	14,962
Wakefield Trinity Wildcats	28–42	Catalans Dragons	6 March 2016	Belle Vue	Phil Bentham	4,442

=== Round 5 ===
Home	Score	Away	Match information
Home	Score	Away	Date and time	Venue	Referee	Attendance
Widnes Vikings	46–6	Hull F.C.	10 March 2016 20:00	Select Security Stadium	Richard Silverwood	4,735
Wigan Warriors	28–6	Leeds Rhinos	11 March 2016 20:00	DW Stadium	Ben Thaler	14,425
St. Helens	44–4	Wakefield Trinity Wildcats	11 March 2016 20:00	Langtree Park	Gareth Hewer	10,008
Catalans Dragons	20–30	Warrington Wolves	12 March 2016 17:00	Stade Gilbert Brutus	James Child	8,859
Huddersfield Giants	38–6	Hull Kingston Rovers	13 March 2016 15:00	John Smiths Stadium	Robert Hicks	5,610
Castleford Tigers	16–32	Salford Red Devils	13 March 2016 15:30	Wheldon Road	Phil Bentham	8,151

=== Round 6 ===
Home	Score	Away	Match information
Home	Score	Away	Date and time	Venue	Referee	Attendance
Wigan Warriors	12–18	Widnes Vikings	17 March 2016 20:00	DW Stadium	Richard Silverwood	11,733
Hull F.C.	22–4	Wakefield Trinity Wildcats	18 March 2016 20:00	KC Stadium	James Child	9,600
Leeds Rhinos	30–18	St. Helens	18 March 2016 20:00	Headingley Stadium	Ben Thaler	17,505
Warrington Wolves	56–12	Castleford Tigers	18 March 2016 20:00	Halliwell Jones Stadium	Robert Hicks	10,940
Huddersfield Giants	26–46	Catalans Dragons	20 March 2016 15:00	John Smiths Stadium	Phil Bentham	4,607
Hull Kingston Rovers	44–30	Salford Red Devils	20 March 2016 15:00	Craven Park	Gareth Hewer	6,593

=== Round 7 (Easter Weekend) ===
Home	Score	Away	Match information
Home	Score	Away	Date and time	Venue	Referee	Attendance
Castleford Tigers	18–14	Leeds Rhinos	24 March 20:00 GMT	The Jungle	James Child	11,426
Hull Kingston Rovers	20–22	Hull F.C.	25 March 12:45 GMT	KC Lightstream Stadium	Phil Bentham	11,050
Salford Red Devils	12–26	Catalans Dragons	25 March 15:00 GMT	AJ Bell Stadium	Richard Silverwood	3,485
St. Helens	12–24	Wigan Warriors	25 March 15:15 GMT	Langtree Park	Robert Hicks	17,980
Wakefield Trinity Wildcats	36–22	Huddersfield Giants	25 March 15:00 GMT	Belle Vue	Gareth Hewer	4,989
Warrington Wolves	28–10	Widnes Vikings	25 March 15:00 GMT	Halliwell Jones Stadium	Ben Thaler	15,008

=== Round 8 (Easter Monday) ===
Home	Score	Away	Match information
Home	Score	Away	Date and time	Venue	Referee	Attendance
Hull F.C.	26–24	Warrington Wolves	28 March 2016 15:00	KC Stadium	Robert Hicks	9,967
Leeds Rhinos	16–20	Wakefield Trinity Wildcats	28 March 2016 15:00	Headingley Stadium	Phil Bentham	16,314
Widnes Vikings	12–20	St. Helens	28 March 2016 15:00	Select Security Stadium	Richard Silverwood	9,076
Huddersfield Giants	24–26	Salford Red Devils	28 March 2016 15:00	John Smith's Stadium	Joe Cobb	4,885
Catalans Dragons	41 –22	Castleford Tigers	28 March 2016 17:15 GMT	Stade Gilbert Brutus	Ben Thaler	10,351
Wigan Warriors	30–16	Hull Kingston Rovers	28 March 2016 20:00	DW Stadium	Chris Kendall	11,268

=== Round 9 ===
Home	Score	Away	Match information
Home	Score	Away	Date and time	Venue	Referee	Attendance
Leeds Rhinos	10–30	Hull Kingston Rovers	1 April 2016 20:00	Headingley Carnegie	Richard Silverwood	15,384
St. Helens	16–17	Hull F.C.	1 April 2016 20:00	Langtree Park	James Child	10,242
Wigan Warriors	16–28	Warrington Wolves	1 April 2016 20:00	DW Stadium	Robert Hicks	17,480
Wakefield Trinity Wildcats	32-18	Salford Red Devils	2 April 2016 14:50	Belle Vue	Joe Cobb	4,048
Catalans Dragons	21-8	Widnes Vikings	2 April 2016 17:00	Stade Gilbert Brutus	Gareth Hewer	8,642
Castleford Tigers	38-34	Huddersfield Giants	3 April 2016 15:30	The Jungle	Phil Bentham	6,631

=== Round 10 ===
Home	Score	Away	Match information
Home	Score	Away	Date and time	Venue	Referee	Attendance
Hull Kingston Rovers	0–40	Catalans Dragons	7 April 2016 20:00	KC Lightstream Stadium	Richard Silverwood	6,764
Warrington Wolves	22–25	St. Helens	8 April 2016 20:00	Halliwell Jones Stadium	Ben Thaler	13,678
Hull F.C.	37–20	Huddersfield Giants	8 April 2016 20:00	KC Stadium	Robert Hicks	10,557
Salford Red Devils	14–10	Leeds Rhinos	9 April 2016 18:30	AJ Bell Stadium	Phil Bentham	4,912
Wakefield Trinity Wildcats	62–0	Wigan Warriors	10 April 2016 15:00	Belle Vue	Gareth Hewer	5,751
Widnes Vikings	24–34	Castleford Tigers	10 April 2016 15:00	Select Security Stadium	Joe Cobb	5,081

=== Round 11 ===
Home	Score	Away	Match information
Home	Score	Away	Date and time	Venue	Referee	Attendance
St. Helens	12–30	Catalans Dragons	14 April 2016 20:00	Langtree Park	Robert Hicks	9,362
Huddersfield Giants	11–0	Warrington Wolves	15 April 2016 20:00	John Smiths Stadium	Richard Silverwood	5,427
Leeds Rhinos	20–18	Hull F.C.	15 April 2016 20:00	Headingley Carnegie	Joe Cobb	15,885
Wigan Warriors	26–12	Castleford Tigers	15 April 2016 20:00	DW Stadium	Phil Bentham	11,849

=== Round 12 ===
Home	Score	Away	Match information
Home	Score	Away	Date and time	Venue	Referee	Attendance
Wigan Warriors	26–19	Huddersfield Giants	21 April 2016 20:00	DW Stadium	Joe Cobb	10,914
St. Helens	38–34	Leeds Rhinos	22 April 2016 20:00	Langtree Park	Phil Bentham	11,271
Widnes Vikings	16–48	Warrington Wolves	22 April 2016 20:00	Select Security Stadium	Robert Hicks	7,441
Catalans Dragons	42–32	Salford Red Devils	23 April 2016 17:00	Stade Gilbert Brutus	Gareth Hewer	9,686
Wakefield Trinity Wildcats	28–46	Hull F.C.	24 April 2016 15:00	Belle Vue	Richard Silverwood	6,701
Castleford Tigers	16–58	Hull Kingston Rovers	24 April 2016 15:30	The Jungle	Ben Thaler	7,106

=== Round 13 ===
Home	Score	Away	Match information
Home	Score	Away	Date and time	Venue	Referee	Attendance
Warrington Wolves	40–10	Wigan Warriors	28 April 2016 20:00	Halliwell Jones Stadium	Phil Bentham	11,724
Huddersfield Giants	28–20	Leeds Rhinos	29 April 2016 20:00	John Smiths Stadium	Robert Hicks	7,536
Hull F.C.	28–26	Catalans Dragons	29 April 2016 20:00	KC Stadium	Ben Thaler	11,374
Widnes Vikings	16–18	Wakefield Trinity Wildcats	29 April 2016 20:00	Select Security Stadium	Joe Cobb	4,398
Salford Red Devils	44–26	Hull Kingston Rovers	30 April 2016 15:00	AJ Bell Stadium	Richard Silverwood	3,048
Castleford Tigers	20-30	St. Helens	1 May 2016 15:30	The Jungle	Gareth Hewer	6,658

=== Round 14 ===
Home	Score	Away	Match information
Home	Score	Away	Date and time	Venue	Referee	Attendance
Leeds Rhinos	12–52	Castleford Tigers	12 May 2016 20:00	Headingley Carnegie	Richard Silverwood	17,213
St. Helens	34–20	Salford Red Devils	13 May 2016 20:00	Langtree Park	Chris Kendall	9,299
Wigan Warriors	16–30	Hull F.C.	13 May 2016 20:00	DW Stadium	Ben Thaler	15,083
Catalans Dragons	16-14	Huddersfield Giants	14 May 2016 17:00	Stade Gilbert Brutus	Gareth Hewer	10,387
Hull Kingston Rovers	24-10	Widnes Vikings	15 May 2016 15:00	Craven Park	Robert Hicks	7,506
Wakefield Trinity Wildcats	36-28	Warrington Wolves	15 May 2016 15:00	Belle Vue	Chris Campbell	5,180

=== Round 15 (Magic Weekend) ===
Home	Score	Away	Match information
Home	Score	Away	Date and time	Venue	Referee	Attendance
Salford Red Devils	18–12	Widnes Vikings	21 May 14:30	St James' Park	James Child	39,331
Warrington Wolves	14–34	Castleford Tigers	21 May 16:45	St James' Park	Gareth Hewer	39,331
Leeds Rhinos	8–40	Wigan Warriors	21 May 19:00	St James' Park	Joe Cobb	39,331
Wakefield Trinity Wildcats	25–24	Catalans Dragons	22 May 13:00	St James' Park	Chris Campbell	28,945
St. Helens	20–48	Huddersfield Giants	22 May 15:15	St James' Park	Ben Thaler	28,945
Hull F.C.	28–16	Hull Kingston Rovers	22 May 17:30	St James' Park	Richard Silverwood	28,945

- Robert Hicks was replaced by fourth official Joe Cobb on 18 minutes due to injury

=== Round 16 ===
Home	Score	Away	Match information
Home	Score	Away	Date and time	Venue	Referee	Attendance
Castleford Tigers	26–33	Wigan Warriors	26 May 2016 20:00	The Jungle	Ben Thaler	5,558
Salford Red Devils	38–8	Wakefield Trinity Wildcats	27 May 2016 20:00	AJ Bell Stadium	Joe Cobb	3,022
Warrington Wolves	52–18	Leeds Rhinos	27 May 2016 20:00	Halliwell Jones Stadium	Chris Campbell	10,317
Catalans Dragons	34–16	Hull Kingston Rovers	28 May 2016 20:00	Stade Gilbert Brutus	James Child	9,859
Hull F.C.	32–24	St. Helens	28 May 2016 20:00	KC Stadium	Gareth Hewer	11,247
Widnes Vikings	24-20	Huddersfield Giants	29 May 2016 15:00	Select Security Stadium	Chris Kendall	4,683

=== Round 17 ===
Home	Score	Away	Match information
Home	Score	Away	Date and time	Venue	Referee	Attendance
Wakefield Trinity Wildcats	16–54	Hull Kingston Rovers	2 June 2016 20:00	Belle Vue	Chris Kendall	5,082
Huddersfield Giants	22–30	Castleford Tigers	3 June 2016 20:00	John Smiths Stadium	Chris Campbell	5,741
Hull F.C.	30–10	Widnes Vikings	3 June 2016 20:00	KC Stadium	Jack Smith	10,259
Leeds Rhinos	12–24	Catalans Dragons	3 June 2016 20:00	Headingley Carnegie	Ben Thaler	14,016
Salford Red Devils	20–23	Wigan Warriors	3 June 2016	AJ Bell Stadium	Gareth Hewer	4,096
St. Helens	4–26	Warrington Wolves	3 June 2016	Langtree Park	James Child	11,353

=== Round 18 ===
Home	Score	Away	Match information
Home	Score	Away	Date and time	Venue	Referee	Attendance
Castleford Tigers	28–38	Widnes Vikings	9 June 2016 20:00	The Jungle	Jack Smith	4,968
Hull Kingston Rovers	18–20	Wigan Warriors	10 June 2016 20:00	KC Lightstream Stadium	Ben Thaler	7,507
Leeds Rhinos	8–0	Salford Red Devils	10 June 2016 20:00	Headingley Carnegie	Chris Kendall	14,462
Warrington Wolves	12–19	Hull F.C.	10 June 2016 20:00	Halliwell Jones Stadium	James Child	10,513
Catalans Dragons	33-16	St. Helens	11 June 2016 17:00	Stade Gilbert Brutus	Chris Campbell	10,789
Huddersfield Giants	2-10	Wakefield Trinity Wildcats	12 June 2016 15:00	John Smiths Stadium	Michael Woodhead	5,077

=== Round 19 ===
Home	Score	Away	Match information
Home	Score	Away	Date and time	Venue	Referee	Attendance
Widnes Vikings	0–7	Wigan Warriors	16 June 2016 20:00	Select Security Stadium	Chris Kendall	6,219
Salford Red Devils	30–31	Huddersfield Giants	17 June 2016 20:00	AJ Bell Stadium	Ben Thaler	1,958
St. Helens	48–16	Hull Kingston Rovers	17 June 2016 20:00	Langtree Park	Jack Smith	9,488
Wakefield Trinity Wildcats	6–32	Leeds Rhinos	17 June 2016 20:00	Belle Vue	James Child	5,500
Warrington Wolves	20–18	Catalans Dragons	17 June 2016 20:00	Halliwell Jones Stadium	Chris Campbell	9,529
Castleford Tigers	22–24	Hull F.C.	19 June 2016 15:30	Wheldon Road	Gareth Hewer	10,790

=== Round 20 ===
Home	Score	Away	Match information
Home	Score	Away	Date and time	Venue	Referee	Attendance
Huddersfield Giants	22-12	Hull F.C.	30 June 2016 20:00	John Smiths Stadium	Chris Kendall	4,143
Hull Kingston Rovers	16–16	Warrington Wolves	1 July 2016 20:00	KC Lightstream Stadium	Michael Woodhead	6,827
Salford Red Devils	22–18	Castleford Tigers	1 July 2016 20:00	AJ Bell Stadium	James Child	2,275
Catalans Dragons	6–26	Wigan Warriors	2 July 2016 18:00	Stade Gilbert Brutus	Gareth Hewer	11,856
Leeds Rhinos	22–23	Widnes Vikings	3 July 2016 15:00	Headingley Carnegie	Ben Thaler	16,130
Wakefield Trinity Wildcats	32–44	St. Helens	3 July 2016 15:00	Belle Vue	Joe Cobb	4,859

=== Round 21 ===
Home	Score	Away	Match information
Home	Score	Away	Date and time	Venue	Referee	Attendance
Warrington Wolves	40–14	Salford Red Devils	7 July 2016 20:00	Halliwell Jones Stadium	Joe Cobb	9,024
Hull F.C.	15–20	Leeds Rhinos	8 July 2016 20:00	KC Stadium	Chris Campbell	11,821
Wigan Warriors	22–18	Wakefield Trinity Wildcats	8 July 2016 20:00	DW Stadium	James Child	11,821
St. Helens	12–10	Widnes Vikings	8 July 2016 20:00	Langtree Park	Gareth Hewer	11,566
Hull Kingston Rovers	20–19	Huddersfield Giants	8 July 2016 20:00	KC Lightstream Stadium	Ben Thaler	6,434
Castleford Tigers	38–24	Catalans Dragons	10 July 2016 15:30	The Mend-O-Hose Jungle	Mike Woodhead	5,886

=== Round 22 ===
Home	Score	Away	Match information
Home	Score	Away	Date and time	Venue	Referee	Attendance
Hull F.C.	36–12	Hull Kingston Rovers	14 July 2016 20:00	KC Stadium	Ben Thaler	17,481
Leeds Rhinos	18–16	Wigan Warriors	15 July 2016 20:00	Headingley Carnegie	Robert Hicks	16,712
Widnes Vikings	24–32	Salford Red Devils	15 July 2016 20:00	Select Security Stadium	Gareth Hewer	4,636
Catalans Dragons	28–30	Wakefield Trinity Wildcats	16 July 2016 20:00	Stade Gilbert Brutus	Chris Campbell	8,562
Huddersfield Giants	18–34	St. Helens	17 July 2016 15:00	John Smiths Stadium	Joe Cobb	5,526
Castleford Tigers	26–42	Warrington Wolves	17 July 2016 15:30	The Mend-A Hose Jungle	Chris Kendall	8,060

=== Round 23 ===
Home	Score	Away	Match information
Home	Score	Away	Date and time	Venue	Referee	Attendance
Hull Kingston Rovers	20–24	Leeds Rhinos	21 July 2016 20:00	KC Lightstream Stadium	Robert Hicks	8,109
Salford Red Devils	20-28	Hull F.C.	22 July 2016 20:00	AJ Bell Stadium	Chris Campbell	3,275
Wigan Warriors	4-23	St. Helens	22 July 2016 20:00	DW Stadium	Phil Bentham	20,049
Warrington Wolves	34-30	Huddersfield Giants	23 July 2016 14:00	Halliwell Jones Stadium	Jack Smith	9,829
Wakefield Trinity Wildcats	20-46	Castleford Tigers	24 July 2916 15:00	Belle Vue	Joe Cobb	6,855
Widnes Vikings	32-4	Catalans Dragons	24 July 2016 1500	Select Security Stadium	James Child	4,195

== Super League ==
The Super League Super 8s sees the top 8 teams from the Super League play 7 games each. Each team's points are carried over and after 7 additional games the top 4 teams will contest the play off semi-finals with the team in 1st hosting the team in 4th, and the team finishing 2nd hosting the 3rd placed team; the winners of these semi-finals will contest the Super League Grand Final at Old Trafford.

=== Round 1 ===
Home	Score	Away	Match information
Home	Score	Away	Venue	Referee	Attendance
Warrington Wolves	18–20	St. Helens	Halliwell Jones Stadium	Bentham	10,881
Hull F.C.	16–30	Castleford Tigers	KCOM Stadium	Smith	9,936
Wigan Warriors	60–12	Wakefield Trinity	DW Stadium	Mikalauskas	10,593
Catalans Dragons	26-10	Widnes Vikings	Stade Gilbert Brutus	Hicks	7,341

=== Round 2 ===
Home	Score	Away	Match information
Home	Score	Away	Venue	Referee	Attendance
Widnes Vikings	0–38	Hull F.C.	Halton Stadium	Thaler	4,359
Castleford Tigers	36-22	Wigan Warriors	Wheldon Road	Cobb	6,325
St. Helens	39-16	Catalans Dragons	Langtree Park	Child	9,440
Wakefield Trinity	10-38	Warrington Wolves	Belle Vue	Hicks	3,552

=== Round 3 ===
Home	Score	Away	Match information
Home	Score	Away	Venue	Referee	Attendance
Hull F.C.	44-0	Catalans Dragons	KCOM Stadium	Bentham	10,494
Wigan Warriors	25-0	St. Helens	DW Stadium	Thaler	15,265
Warrington Wolves	14-11	Castleford Tigers	Halliwell Jones Stadium	Kendall	9,228
Widnes Vikings	40–8	Wakefield Trinity	Halton Stadium		4,010

=== Round 4 ===
Home	Score	Away	Match information
Home	Score	Away	Venue	Referee	Attendance
Wigan Warriors	6-8	Widnes Vikings	DW Stadium	Bentham	11,495
St. Helens	31-10	Hull F.C.	Langtree Park	Campbell	10,086
Catalans Dragons	22-26	Warrington Wolves	Stade Gilbert Brutus	Smith	7,108
Castleford Tigers	46-22	Wakefield Trinity	Wheldon Road	Hewer	6,298

=== Round 5 ===
Home	Score	Away	Match information
Home	Score	Away	Venue	Referee	Attendance
St. Helens	40–16	Castleford Tigers	Langtree Park	Smith	9,448
Warrington Wolves	30–12	Widnes Vikings	Halliwell Jones Stadium	Hewer	10,488
Hull F.C.	12–18	Wigan Warriors	KCOM Stadium	Thaler	11,686
Wakefield Trinity	10–14	Catalans Dragons	Belle Vue	Child	2,612

=== Round 6 ===
Home	Score	Away	Match information
Home	Score	Away	Venue	Referee	Attendance
Widnes Vikings	8–21	St. Helens	Halton Stadium	Child	6,128
Warrington Wolves	28–35	Wigan Warriors	Halliwell Jones Stadium	Hicks	13,044
Catalans Dragons	28–34	Castleford Tigers	Stade Gilbert Brutus	Bentham	7,802
Wakefield Trinity	12–18	Hull F.C.	Belle Vue	Campbell	3,413

=== Round 7 ===
Home	Score	Away	Match information
Home	Score	Away	Venue	Referee	Attendance
St. Helens	32–12	Wakefield Trinity	Langtree Park	Cobb	9,516
Hull F.C.	6–23	Warrington Wolves	KCOM Stadium	Thaler	17,453
Wigan Warriors	48–24	Catalans Dragons	DW Stadium	Bentham	16,140
Castleford Tigers	40–26	Widnes Vikings	Wheldon Road	Smith	7,103

=== Standings ===
Pos	Club	P	W	D	L	For	Agst	Diff	Points	Qualification
1	Warrington Wolves (L)	30	21	1	8	852	541	311	43	Playoffs
2	Wigan Warriors (C)	30	21	0	9	669	560	109	42	Playoffs
3	Hull F.C. (Q)	30	20	0	10	749	579	170	40	Playoffs
4	St. Helens (Q)	30	20	0	10	756	641	115	40	Playoffs
5	Castleford Tigers (U)	30	15	1	14	830	808	22	31	Season Complete
6	Catalans Dragons (U)	30	15	0	15	723	716	7	30	Season Complete
7	Widnes Vikings (U)	30	12	0	18	603	643	-40	24	Season Complete
8	Wakefield Trinity (U)	30	10	0	20	571	902	-331	20	Season Complete

(C) = Champions

(L) = League Leaders

(Q) = Qualified for playoffs

(U) = Unable to qualify for playoffs

=== Play-offs ===
#	Home	Score	Away	Match information
#	Home	Score	Away	Date and time (local)	Venue	Referee	Attendance
SEMI-FINALS
SF1	Warrington Wolves	18–10	St. Helens	29 September 20:00	Halliwell Jones Stadium	Thaler	12,036
SF2	Wigan Warriors	28-18	Hull F.C.	30 September 20:00	DW Stadium	Hicks	10,013
GRAND FINAL
F	Warrington Wolves	6–12	Wigan Warriors	8 October 18:00	Old Trafford, Manchester	Hicks	70,202
