= Wembley Stadium (1923) =

Former stadium in Wembley Park, London

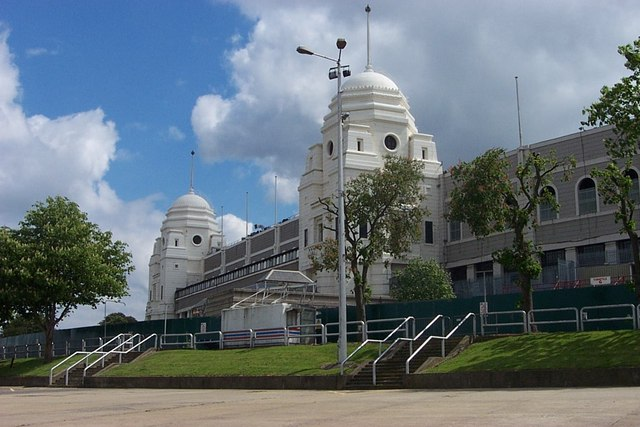
- The Twin Towers of Wembley Stadium (2002)
- Interactive map of Wembley Stadium
- Former names: Empire Stadium; British Empire Exhibition Stadium
- Location: Wembley, England
- Coordinates: 51°33′20″N 0°16′47″W
- Owner: Wembley Company
- Capacity: 82,000 (original standing capacity was 125,000, and later 100,000 prior to being made all-seated in 1990)
- Surface: Grass and track
- Record attendance: 126,047 (Bolton Wanderers vs West Ham United – 1923 FA Cup final)

Construction
- Groundbreaking: 1922; 104 years ago
- Opened: 28 April 1923; 103 years ago
- Renovated: 1963; 63 years ago
- Closed: 7 October 2000; 26 years ago
- Demolished: 2002–2003
- Rebuilt: Replaced in 2007 by the new Wembley Stadium
- Cost: £750,000 (£49.81 million in 2023)
- Architects: Sir John William Simpson and Maxwell Ayrton; Sir Owen Williams (engineer)

Tenants
- England national football team (1923–2000); Wembley Lions speedway team (1946–1957, 1970–1971); Wales national rugby union team (1997–1999); Arsenal (UEFA matches, 1998–2000); London Monarchs (1991–1992) Leyton Orient FC (1930); Argonauts (1928–1930); Major sporting events hosted: 1948 Summer Olympics; 1963 European Cup final; 1966 FIFA World Cup; 1968 European Cup final; 1971 European Cup final; 1978 European Cup final; 1992 European Cup final; 1995 Rugby League World Cup; UEFA Euro 1996

The first Wembley Stadium (/ˈwɛmbli/), originally known as the Empire Stadium, was a football stadium in Wembley, London, England. It opened in 1923 and was demolished in 2002 to make room for the new Wembley Stadium.

Wembley hosted the FA Cup final annually, the first in 1923, which was the stadium's inaugural event, the League Cup final annually, five European Cup finals, the 1966 World Cup final, and the Euro 1996 final. Brazilian footballer Pelé once said of the stadium: "Wembley is the cathedral of football. It is the capital of football and it is the heart of football", in recognition of its status as the world's most famous football stadium.

The stadium also hosted many other sports events, including the 1948 Summer Olympics, rugby league's Challenge Cup final, and the 1992 and 1995 Rugby League World Cup finals. It was also the venue for numerous music events, including the 1985 Live Aid charity concert, as well as SummerSlam 1992, the first major professional wrestling pay-per-view to take place outside of North America.

== History ==
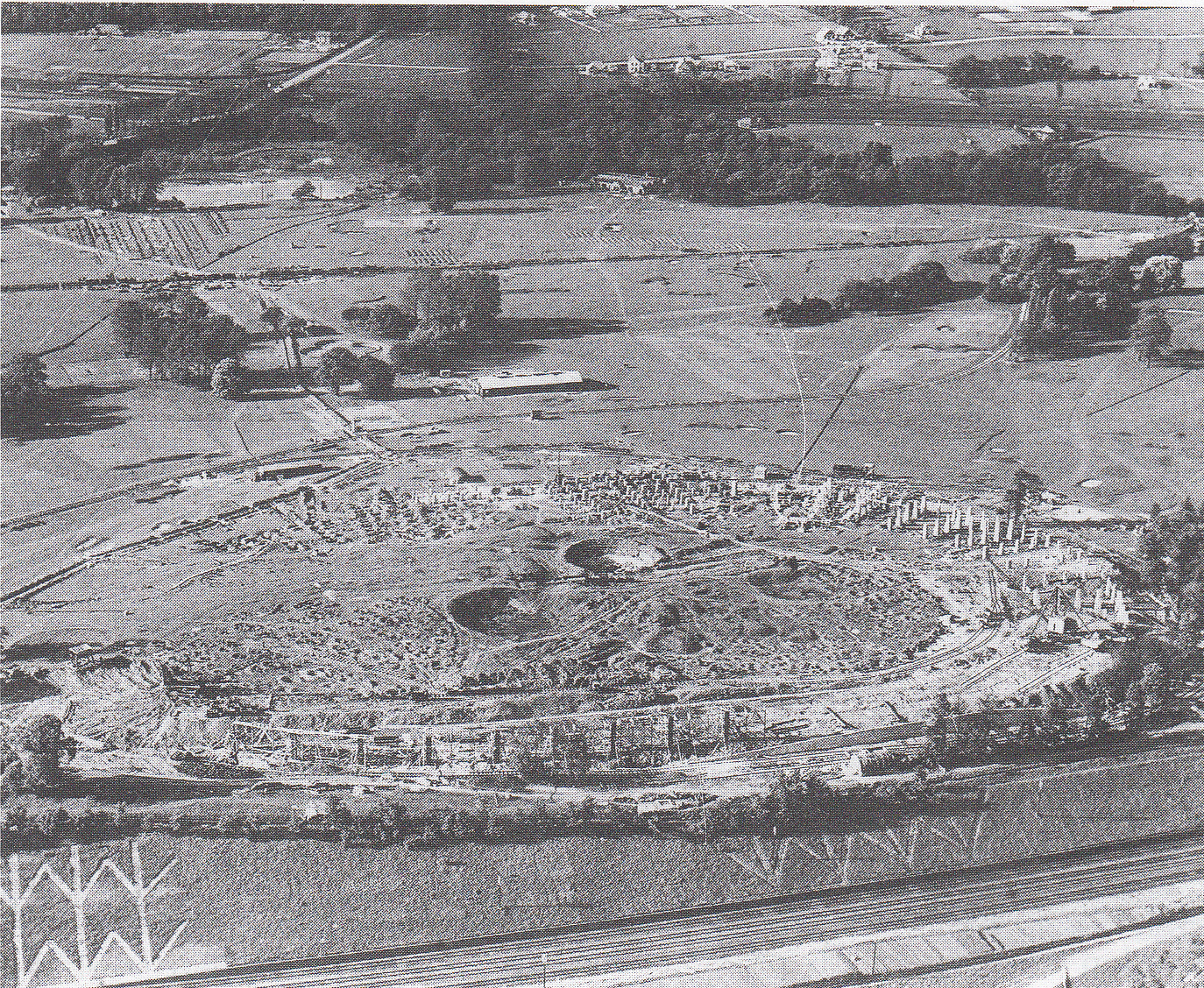
Wembley Stadium under construction in 1922. The foundations of Watkin's Tower can be seen.

The stadium's first turf was cut by King George V and it was first opened to the public on 28 April 1923. Much of Humphry Repton's original Wembley Park landscape was transformed in 1922–23 during preparations for the British Empire Exhibition of 1924–25. First known as the "British Empire Exhibition Stadium" or simply the "Empire Stadium", the construction was carried out by Sir Robert McAlpine.

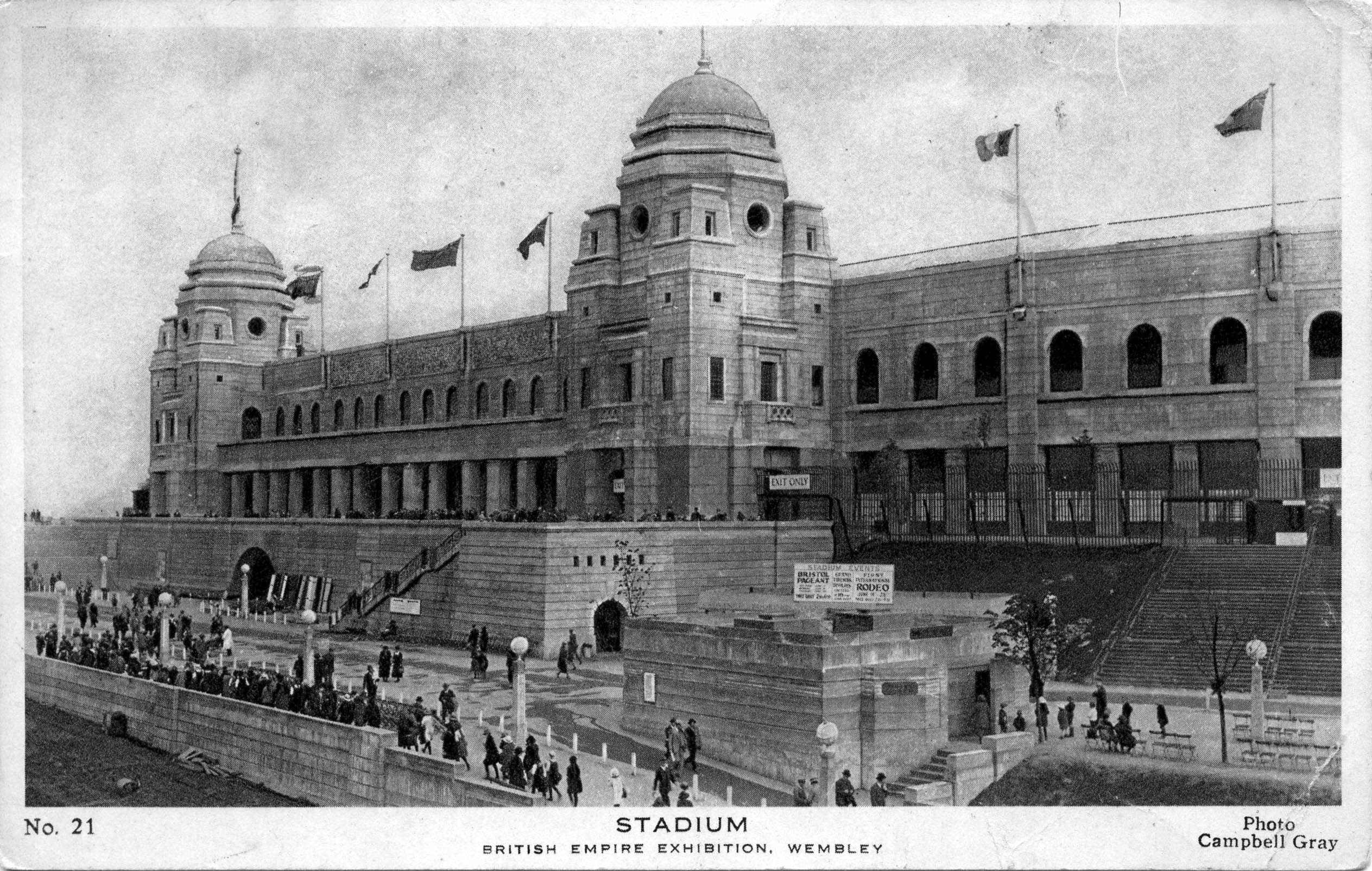
Postcard depicting the British Empire Exhibition in 1924 Twin Towers

The stadium cost £750,000 (equivalent to approximately £49.81 million in 2023) and was constructed on the site of a folly called Watkin's Tower. The architects were Sir John Simpson and Maxwell Ayrton and the head engineer Sir Owen Williams. The original intention was to demolish the stadium at the end of the Exhibition, but it was saved at the suggestion of Sir James Stevenson, a Scot who was chairman of the organising committee for the Empire Exhibition. The ground had been used for football as early as the 1880s.

At the end of the exhibition, which proved to be a financial disappointment, the site at Wembley was considered by many to be a vast 'white elephant'. It was bought by a property speculator, James White, who planned to sell off the buildings for redevelopment, including the stadium which had been the centrepiece of the exhibition. Arthur Elvin, an ex-RFC officer who had worked in a tobacco kiosk at the exhibition and had previous experience working for a scrap metal firm, was employed by White to oversee the sale of the buildings and the clearance of the Wembley site.

The stadium had gone into liquidation after it was pronounced "financially unviable". After nine months, having earned a good sum from selling various buildings on the site, Elvin agreed to buy the stadium from White for a total of £127,000 as a £12,000 downpayment and the balance plus interest payable over ten years.

Facing personal bankruptcy, White killed himself at his home, King Edward's Place, in 1927. This caused financial complications for Elvin, requiring him to raise money within two weeks to buy the stadium before it too was demolished. He was able to finance this by forming the 'Wembley Stadium and Greyhound Racecourse Company'. He raised the money to buy the stadium at the original price he had agreed with White, then immediately sold it back to the company, leaving him with a healthy personal profit. Instead of cash, he received shares in the company, which gave him the largest individual stake in Wembley Stadium, and subsequently became chairman.

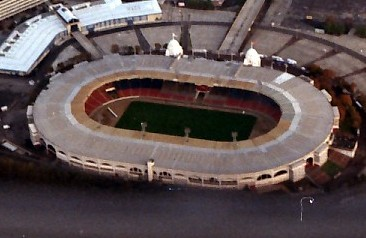
Aerial view of Wembley Stadium, 1991

Elvin was able to make a considerable profit with the introduction of greyhound racing from 1927 and is credited with saving the stadium from closure and demolition.

The electric scoreboard and the all-encircling roof, made from aluminium and translucent glass, were added in 1963.

In 1977 fences were erected around the pitch following the England vs Scotland match when Scotland fans invaded the pitch and vandalised the pitch and goalposts. These fences were taken down following the Hillsborough disaster in 1989.

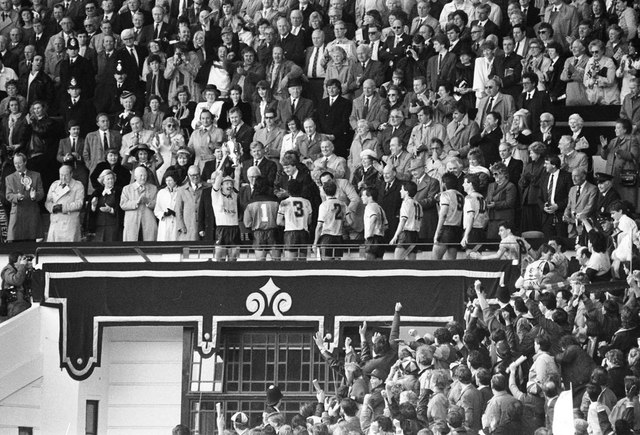
The Royal Box in April 1986. Trophy presentations took place here.

The stadium's distinctive Twin Towers became its trademark and nickname. Also well known were the 39 steps needed to be climbed to reach the Royal box and collect a trophy (and winners'/losers' medals). In 1934, the Empire Pool was built nearby. The "Wembley Stadium Collection" is held by the National Football Museum. The stadium closed in October 2000 and demolition commenced in December 2002, completing in 2003 for redevelopment. The original foundations of Watkin's Tower were rediscovered during the demolition. The top of one of the twin towers was erected as a memorial in the park on the north side of Overton Close in the nearby Saint Raphael's Estate.

The cities of Birmingham and Coventry launched bids to become the new home of England's football team following disputes and a political row regarding the new Wembley's construction. These bids were ultimately unsuccessful as the FA chose in 2002 to keep the national team at the new Wembley once completed.

== Football ==
Wembley is best known for hosting football matches, having hosted the FA Cup Final annually as well as numerous England International fixtures.

=== White Horse Final ===
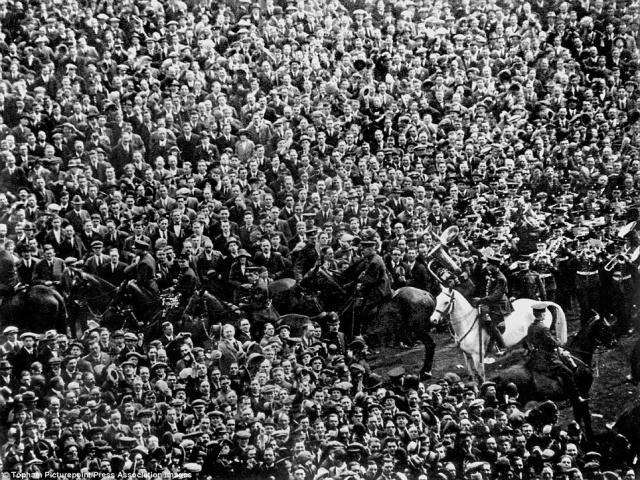
Billy the White Horse, saviour of the 1923 FA Cup final

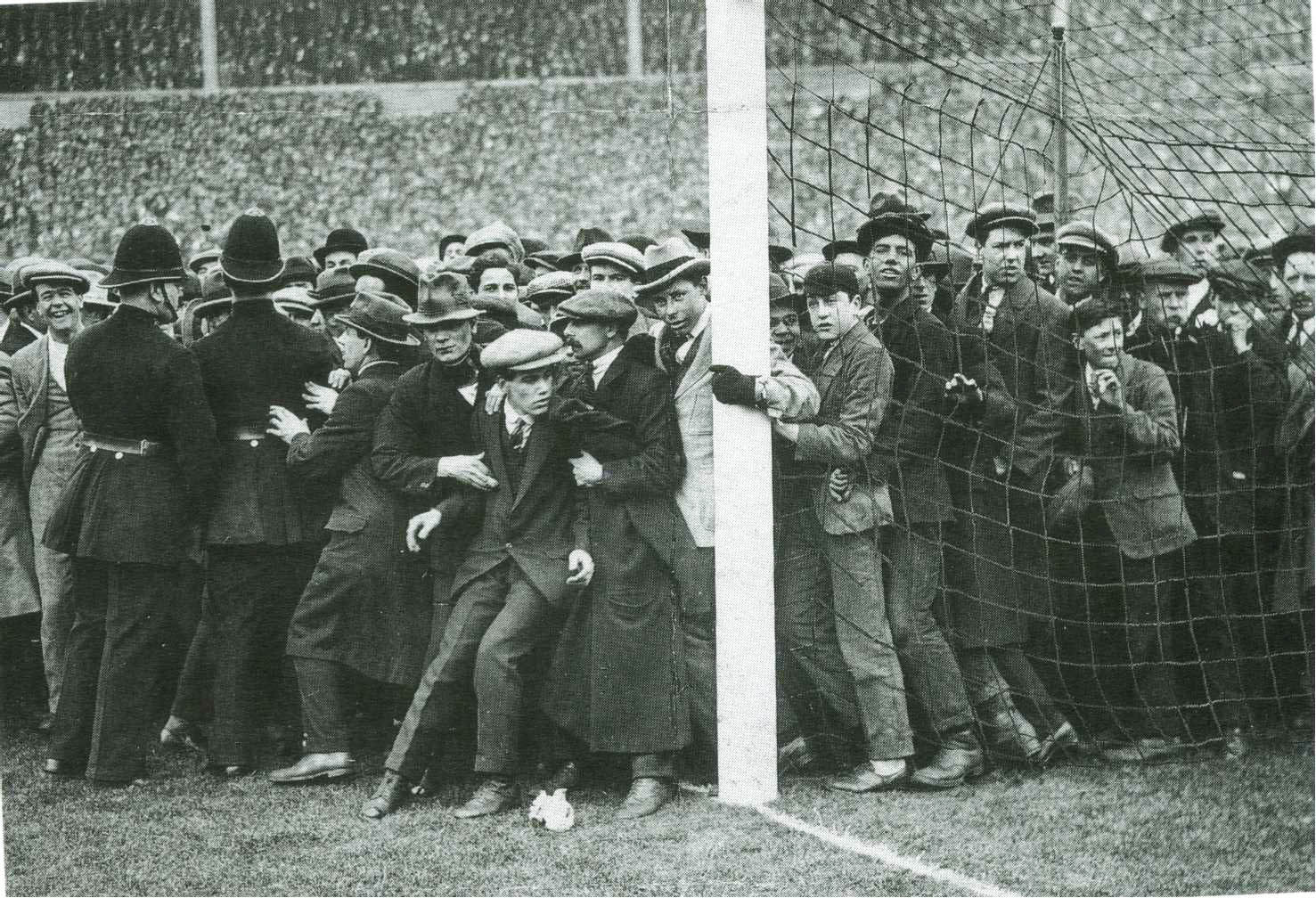
Crowds at the edges of the pitch

The Empire Stadium was built in exactly 300 days at the cost of £750,000. Described as the world's greatest sporting arena, it was ready only four days before the "White Horse" final in 1923. The FA had not considered admission by ticket, grossly underestimating the number of fans who arrived at the 104 gates on match day. However, after this match, every event apart from the 1982 replay was ticketed.

The first event held at the stadium was the 1923 FA Cup final on 28 April between Bolton Wanderers and West Ham United. This is known as the White Horse Final. Such was the eagerness to attend the final at the new national stadium that vast numbers of people crammed through the 104 turnstiles into the stadium, far exceeding its official 127,000 capacity. The crowds overflowed onto the pitch as there was no room on the terraces. Estimates of the number of fans in attendance range from 240,000 to well over 300,000.

It was thought that the match would not be played because of the number of spectators inside the stadium that had spilled onto the pitch, until mounted police, including Police Constable George Scorey and his white horse, Billy, slowly pushed the crowds back to the sides of the field of play to allow the match to kick off just 45 minutes late. In honour of Billy, the footbridge outside the new Wembley Stadium has been named the White Horse Bridge. The official attendance is often quoted as 126,047. The match saw a 2–0 victory for Bolton Wanderers, with David Jack scoring the first ever goal at Wembley.

=== Matthews Final ===
The 1953 FA Cup final between Blackpool and Bolton Wanderers was dubbed the "Matthews final" after Blackpool's winger Stanley Matthews. At age 38, he was making his third and ultimately his final attempt at winning an FA Cup medal. In the previous six years, he failed to earn a winner's medal against Manchester United in 1948 and Newcastle United in 1951. It featured a hat-trick by Blackpool's Stan Mortensen in his side's 4–3 win, with Matthews almost single-handedly turning the match around for Blackpool, who had trailed 3–1 to Bolton Wanderers before fighting back to win the match. It remained the only hat-trick ever scored in an FA Cup Final at the original Wembley.

The FA Cup final was played there in April or May until 2000 (excluding the 1970 replay when Chelsea beat Leeds United at Old Trafford). It was also the venue for finals of the FA Amateur Cup, League Cup (except for the early years when this was settled on a home and away basis) and in later years the Associate Members' Cup and the Football League promotion play-off finals (in the early years of play-offs they were home and away fixtures). The 1988 final of the Middlesex Charity Cup was also played there.

=== International fixtures ===
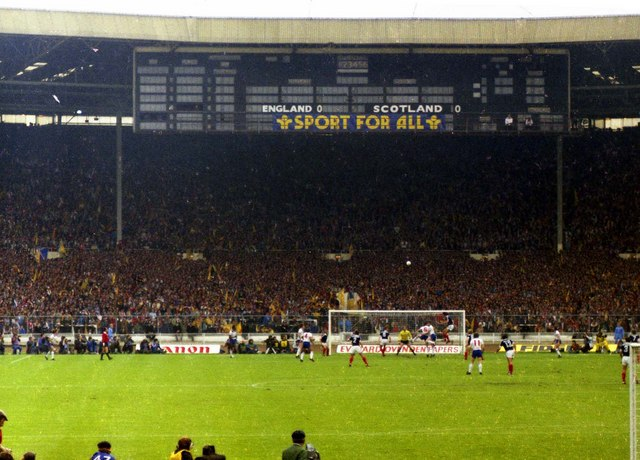
England v Scotland in 1981

Prior to the 1923 Wembley stadium, international football games had been played by England at various stadia. Most early internationals (including the first ever international football match (1870)) were played at The Oval, which opened in 1845 as the home ground of Surrey County Cricket Club and would in 1880 host the first Test match played in England. For the first 27 years, the only International England games played at Wembley were fixtures against Scotland, with other games played elsewhere until 1951. The first team other than Scotland to face England at the venue was Argentina. In 1956 and 1971, it was the venue of the home matches of the Great Britain national football team for the qualification matches to the Summer Olympic Games against Bulgaria.

In 1966, it was the leading venue of the FIFA World Cup. It hosted nine matches, including the final, where tournament hosts England won 4–2 after extra time against West Germany. Seven years later, Wembley was the venue for a specially arranged friendly between teams called "The Three" and "The Six" to celebrate the United Kingdom joining the European Economic Community. The match finished 2–0 to "The Three".

In 1996, it was the principal venue of UEFA Euro 1996, hosting all of England's matches, as well as the tournament's final, where Germany won the UEFA European Championship for a third time after defeating the Czech Republic 2–1 with the first international golden goal in football history. Germany had earlier defeated England on penalties in the semi-final after a 1–1 draw, with Gareth Southgate having his penalty saved against England in the shoot-out.

England's final two competitive matches played at the stadium resulted in 0–1 defeats for England to Scotland and Germany respectively. The first defeat was in the play off for the Euro 2000 qualifiers in November 1999, but England still went through as they won the other leg 2–0 at Hampden Park. However, the final match at Wembley was the opening qualifier for the 2002 World Cup, and defeat prompted the resignation of England manager Kevin Keegan at the end of the match after 18 months in charge.

==== 1966 World Cup ====
Date	Time (BST)	Team #1	Score	Team #2	Round	Attendance
11 July 1966	19:30	England	0–0	Uruguay	Group 1	87,148
13 July 1966	19:30	France	1–1	Mexico	Group 1	69,237
16 July 1966	19:30	England	2–0	Mexico	Group 1	92,570
19 July 1966	16:30	Mexico	0–0	Uruguay	Group 1	61,112
20 July 1966	19:30	England	2–0	France	Group 1	98,370
23 July 1966	15:00	England	1–0	Argentina	Quarter-finals	90,584
25 July 1966	19:30	England	2–1	Portugal	Semi-finals	94,493
28 July 1966	19:30	Portugal	2–1	Soviet Union	3rd place match	87,696
30 July 1966	15:00	England	4–2 (a.e.t.)	West Germany	Final	96,924

==== Euro 1996 ====
Date	Time (BST)	Team #1	Score	Team #2	Round	Attendance
8 June 1996	15:00	England	1–1	Switzerland	Group A	76,567
15 June 1996	15:00	Scotland	0–2	England	Group A	76,864
18 June 1996	19:30	Netherlands	1–4	England	Group A	76,798
22 June 1996	15:00	Spain	0–0 (a.e.t.) (2–4 pen.)	England	Quarter-finals	75,440
26 June 1996	19:30	Germany	1–1 (a.e.t.) (6–5 pen.)	England	Semi-finals	75,862
30 June 1996	19:00	Czech Republic	1–2 (a.e.t.)	Germany	Final	73,611

=== Club football ===
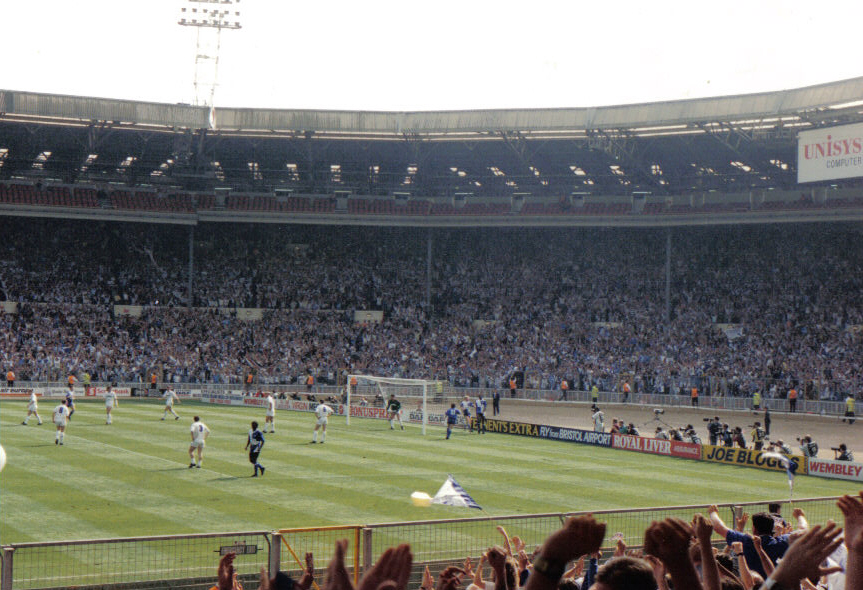
Tranmere Rovers defeated Bristol Rovers in the 1990 Associate Members' Cup final

In all, the stadium hosted five European Cup finals, a record for the continent's top football tournament until the inauguration of the new Wembley Stadium in 2007. The first two were 1963 final between Milan and Benfica, and the 1968 final between Manchester United and Benfica. In 1971, it again hosted the final, between Ajax and Panathinaikos, and once more in 1978, this time between Liverpool and Club Brugge, another in 1992, when Barcelona played Sampdoria.

Wembley also hosted two European Cup Winners' Cup finals: in 1965, when West Ham United defeated 1860 Munich, and in 1993, when Parma defeated Royal Antwerp.

It was also the venue for Arsenal's home Champions League matches in 1998–99 and 1999–2000. It has hosted clubs' home matches on two other occasions; in 1930, when Leyton Orient played two home Third Division South matches while their Lea Bridge Stadium was undergoing urgent remedial works; and in 1930–31 for eight matches by non-League Ealing A.F.C. It was also to be the home of the amateur club which made several applications to join the Football League, the Argonauts.

In March 1998, Arsenal made a bid to purchase Wembley in the hope of gaining a larger stadium to replace their Highbury ground, which had a capacity of less than 40,000 and was unsuitable for expansion. However, the bid was later abandoned in favour of building the 60,000 capacity Emirates Stadium, which was opened in 2006.

=== Last matches ===
On 20 May 2000, the last FA Cup final to be played at the old Wembley saw Chelsea defeat Aston Villa with the only goal scored by Roberto Di Matteo. The final competitive club match there was the 2000 First Division play-off final on 29 May 2000, between Ipswich Town and Barnsley, a 4–2 win resulting in promotion to the Premier League for Ipswich.

The last club match of all was the 2000 Charity Shield, in which Chelsea defeated Manchester United 2–0. The last international match was on 7 October, in Kevin Keegan's last game as England manager. England were defeated 0–1 by Germany, with Dietmar Hamann scoring the last goal at the original Wembley. On that day, Tony Adams made his 60th Wembley appearance, a record for any player. Adams also claimed England's final goal at the stadium, having scored in the previous home fixture against Ukraine on 31 May 2000.

== Other sports ==
=== Rugby league ===
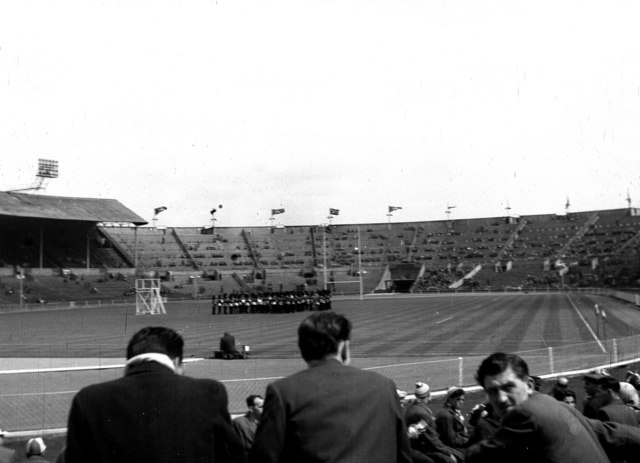
A marching band entertains the incoming crowd prior to the 1956 Rugby League Cup Final

In the sport of rugby league, the RFL held its Challenge Cup Final at Wembley from 1929 onwards. The stadium was also regularly used by the sport for major international matches, such as Great Britain versus Australia. In 1949 the France national rugby league team became the first France national team of any sport to win at Wembley. The largest crowd for a Challenge Cup Final at Wembley was set in 1985 when Wigan beat Hull F.C. 28–24 in front of 99,801 spectators, which as of 2017 remains the second highest rugby league attendance in England behind only the 1954 Challenge Cup Final replay at Bradford's Odsal Stadium when a then world record attendance of 102,575 saw Warrington defeat Halifax 8–4 (the original 1954 cup final at Wembley, drawn 4–4, was played in front of 81,841 fans).

The stadium set the international record crowd for a rugby league game when 73,631 turned out for the 1992 Rugby League World Cup final between Great Britain and Australia (since beaten by the 74,468 attendance for the 2013 RLWC Final at Old Trafford). The Mal Meninga-led Australian team won the game 10–6 on the back of a Steve Renouf try in the north-east corner and Meninga's goal kicking. The 1995 World Cup Final between England and Australia was also played at Wembley with 66,540 spectators watching Australia win 16–8. The final of the 1999 Challenge Cup was the last to be played at the stadium and was attended by 73,242 fans, with the annual fixture moving to other grounds (Murrayfield Stadium, Millennium Stadium and Twickenham) before returning to the new Wembley upon its completion in 2007.

==== Internationals ====
Date	Winner	Score	Runners-up	Attendance	Competition	Notes
18 January 1930	Australia	26–10	Wales	20,000	1929–30 Kangaroo tour	
30 December 1933	Australia	51–19	Wales	10,000	1933–34 Kangaroo tour	
12 March 1949	France	12–5	England	15,000	1948–49 European Rugby League Championship	First France national team (any sport) to win at Wembley
16 October 1963	Australia	22–16	Great Britain	13,946	1963 Kangaroo tour	
3 November 1973	Great Britain	21–12	Australia	9,874	1973 Kangaroo tour	
27 October 1990	Great Britain	19–12	Australia	54,569	1990 Kangaroo tour	
24 October 1992	Australia	10–6	Great Britain	73,631	1992 Rugby League World Cup final	New international rugby league attendance record
16 October 1993	Great Britain	17–0	New Zealand	36,131	1993 Kiwi tour	
22 October 1994	Great Britain	8–4	Australia	57,034	1994 Kangaroo tour	
7 October 1995	England	20–16	Australia	41,271	1995 Rugby League World Cup (Group A)	
28 October 1995	Australia	16–8	England	66,540	1995 Rugby League World Cup final	
1 November 1997	Australia (SL)	38–14	Great Britain	41,135	1997 Super League Test series	

=== 1948 Summer Olympics ===
Wembley was the main venue for the 1948 Summer Olympics, with Fanny Blankers-Koen and Emil Zátopek among the notable winners in athletics. The Stadium also hosted the semifinals and finals of the Olympic hockey and football tournaments, the Prix des Nations event in the equestrian competition, and a demonstration match of lacrosse.

=== Speedway ===
Motorcycle speedway first took place at Wembley in 1929, and operated until the outbreak of World War II in 1939, a few days before the 1939 World Championship Final was due to be held, but it was cancelled as a result of the war. The Wembley Lions returned in 1946 and operated in the top flight until the end of the 1956 season winning a number of League titles. A short lived revival saw the Lions in the British League in the 1970 and 1971 seasons. Lionel Van Praag (1936), Tommy Price (1949), and Freddie Williams (1950 and 1953), all won World Championships whilst riding for Wembley. The ashes for the speedway track were supplied by Richard Biffa Ltd whose operating base at the time was in Wembley Hill Road. Richard Biffa later became Biffa Waste Services. The Lions were formed by the Wembley Stadium chairman Sir Arthur Elvin.

Between 1936 and 1960 Wembley hosted all of the first 15 finals of the Speedway World Championship. It hosted another nine World Finals before the last one at Wembley took place in 1981 in front of 92,500 fans, just shy of the venue's record speedway attendance of 95,000 set at the 1938 World Final.

Riders who won the World Championship at Wembley include; inaugural champion Lionel Van Praag (Australia), Jack Milne (United States), Bluey Wilkinson (Australia), Tommy Price (England), Freddie Williams (Wales), Jack Young (Australia – the first two-time winner, first back-to-back winner and the first second division rider to win the title), Ronnie Moore (New Zealand), Ove Fundin (Sweden), Barry Briggs (New Zealand), Peter Craven (England), Björn Knutson (Sweden), Ole Olsen (Denmark), Bruce Penhall (United States – the winner of the 1981 World Final), and legendary New Zealand rider Ivan Mauger. With four wins, Sweden's Ove Fundin won the most World Championships at Wembley, winning in 1956, 1960, 1963 and 1967.

Wembley also hosted the Final of the Speedway World Team Cup in 1968, 1970 and 1973 won by Great Britain (1968 and 1973) and Sweden (1970).

The speedway track at Wembley Stadium was 345 metres (377 yards) in length and was notoriously difficult to ride for those not used to it. Despite regularly being used for World Championship and other British championship meetings, Wembley long had a reputation as a track that was difficult to pass on which often led to processional racing. Among those who never performed well there despite their credentials include 1973 World Champion Jerzy Szczakiel (who won his title at home in Poland and two weeks later under difficult circumstances failed to score in the World Team Cup Final at Wembley), while others such as Ivan Mauger and Ole Olsen often seemed to find their best form at the stadium. The track itself was located inside of the greyhound racing track, but intersected the stadium's playing field at the corners. The pits were located in the tunnel at the eastern end of the stadium.

The track record at Wembley will forever be held by Denmark's World Champion of 1984, 1985 & 1988 Erik Gundersen. In Heat 6 of the 1981 World Final, Gundersen set the 4-lap record (clutch start) of 66.8 seconds. As this was the last time the stadium was used for speedway racing, it remains the track record.

=== Stock car racing ===
Two meetings were held at Wembley in 1974 promoted by Trevor Redmond. The first meeting held featured BriSCA Formula 1 Stock Cars and National Hot Rods. The second meeting featured the BriSCA Formula 2 Stock Cars World Final with F1s in support. Before the first meeting the Wembley groundsman threatened to resign over possible damage to the hallowed turf. The pitch was surrounded by wooden beams and little damage was caused.

=== Rugby union ===
Though the venue was not traditionally a regular host of rugby union matches, England played a friendly against Canada on 17 October 1992, as their regular home stadium at Twickenham was undergoing redevelopment. Wales played their Five Nations and autumn international home matches at Wembley (as Twickenham Stadium would not accommodate them) while Cardiff Arms Park was being rebuilt as the Millennium Stadium in the late 1990s (a deal reciprocated for FA Cups during the construction of the new Wembley Stadium). In total there were seven internationals.

Date	Competition	Home team		Away team		Attendance
17 October 1992	1992 Autumn International Series	England	26	Canada	13	
29 November 1997	1997 Autumn International Series	Wales	7	New Zealand	42	76,000
5 April 1998	1998 Five Nations Championship	Wales	0	France	51	75,000
7 March 1998	1998 Five Nations Championship	Wales	19	Scotland	13	72,000
14 November 1998	1998 Autumn International Series	Wales	20	South Africa	28	55,000
20 February 1999	1999 Five Nations Championship	Wales	23	Ireland	29	76,000
11 April 1999	1999 Five Nations Championship	Wales	32	England	31	76,000

=== Greyhound racing ===
Wembley was a regular venue for greyhound racing. It was the first sport Sir Arthur Elvin introduced to the stadium. The opening meeting was in 1927. The greyhound racing provided the stadium with its main source of regular income, especially in the early decades, and continued to attract crowds of several thousand up until the early 1960s. The stadium staged its last greyhound race meeting in December 1998 with the owners, the Greyhound Racing Association, citing economic reasons and the lack of plans for a greyhound track in the stadium's redevelopment.

Two of the biggest events in the greyhound racing calendar were the St Leger and Trafalgar Cup. Both were originally held at Wembley, the St Leger from 1928 until 1998 after which it moved to Wimbledon Stadium and the Trafalgar Cup from 1929 until 1998 after which it moved to Oxford Stadium. In 1931 the famous greyhound Mick the Miller won the St Leger.

Wembley's owners' refusal to cancel the regular greyhound racing meant that the match between Uruguay and France in the 1966 FIFA World Cup was played at White City.

=== American football ===
American Football was played at Wembley as long ago as 1952 when the Fursty Eagles defeated the Burtonwood Bullets 26–7 in The American European Zone Football Final. The National Football League (NFL) held nine preseason American football games at Wembley between 1983 and 1993. The Minnesota Vikings and the St. Louis Cardinals played the first game on 6 August 1983. The Detroit Lions and the Dallas Cowboys played the last game on 8 August 1993. The United States Football League also played an exhibition game there on 21 July 1984 between the Philadelphia Stars and Tampa Bay Bandits. The Chicago Bears played the Dallas Cowboys in the inaugural American Bowl on 3 August 1986, defeating the Cowboys 17–6. The London Monarchs of the World League of American Football played at the venue in 1991 and 1992. Wembley hosted World Bowl '91, the inaugural World Bowl, where the Monarchs defeated the Barcelona Dragons 21–0.

=== Gaelic football ===
From 1958 until the mid-1970s, hurling and gaelic football tournaments known as the "Wembley Tournaments" were held at Wembley Stadium to bring the Irish sports to expatriates in Britain at the time. Several Gaelic football games were played in Wembley Stadium, most of them exhibition matches, most notably Kerry and Down in 1961.

=== Horse of the year show ===
In April 1970 this show jumping event was held at Wembley Stadium. This left the grass turf in poor condition for the FA Cup Final a week later.

=== Other events ===
The stadium also staged women's field hockey matches in which England appeared in their annual match between 1951 and 1969 and then from 1971 to 1991. The best-attended field hockey match of all time took place at the Wembley Stadium on 11 March 1978, when 65,165 people showed up for a game between England and the United States.

On 31 May and 1 June 1961, Wembley hosted a ski jumping competition. A 46-metre high scaffolding tower was constructed for the event, which was won by Finland's Veikko Kankkonen.

On 18 June 1963, Wembley hosted a heavyweight boxing match between London native boxer Henry Cooper and American rising star Cassius Clay in front of 35,000 spectators.

On 26 May 1975, in front of 90,000 people, Evel Knievel crashed while trying to land a jump over 13 single decker city buses, an accident which resulted in his initial retirement from his daredevil life.

In 1992, the World Wrestling Federation (now known as WWE) drew a sellout of 80,355 when SummerSlam was hosted at Wembley Stadium. In the main event, English wrestler Davey Boy Smith won the Intercontinental Championship from Bret Hart. As of April 2023, WWE considers this to be their seventh largest live gate in history behind only WrestleMania 32 (2016), which drew a reported 101,763, WrestleMania III (1987), which drew a reported 93,173, WrestleMania 35, which drew 82,265, WrestleMania 39 (2023) Night 2 and Night 1, which drew 81,395 and 80,497, respectively, and WrestleMania 29 (2013), which drew 80,676 fans.

== Music ==
The stadium became a musical venue in August 1972 with The London Rock and Roll Show, an all star concert. It later played host to a number of concerts and events, most notably the British leg of Live Aid, which featured such acts as David Bowie, Queen, Paul McCartney, Elton John, Phil Collins, Status Quo, the Who, Dire Straits and U2, held at the stadium on 13 July 1985.

Other charity concerts which took place in the stadium were the Human Rights Now! concert, The Nelson Mandela 70th Birthday Tribute Concert, Nelson Mandela: An International Tribute for a Free South Africa Concert, The Freddie Mercury Tribute Concert for AIDS Awareness and the NetAid charity concert.

Acts who played at Wembley Stadium include:

- Michael Jackson performed 15 times at this location, the most by any artist in the history of Wembley Stadium. During Michael Jackson's Bad World Tour in 1988, he was given a special award by Wembley Stadium Officials for breaking a Guinness World Record with a combined total of 504,000 people attending the seven sold-out Wembley shows. The concert on 16 July 1988 was attended by Diana, Princess of Wales and Prince Charles (now King Charles III), and a DVD of this concert (Live at Wembley July 16, 1988) was released on 18 September 2012. Jackson also performed at the stadium on 30 and 31 July, and 20, 22 and 23 August 1992 on his Dangerous World Tour, and 12, 15 and 17 July 1997 on his HIStory World Tour.
- Crosby, Stills, Nash and Young played 14 September 1974. Guests included Joni Mitchell, The Band, and Jesse Colin Young.
- Elton John performed seven times, including 1975, 1984, 1992 with Eric Clapton and 1998 with Billy Joel . He headlined The Summer of 84 concert, part of his European Express Tour, along with bands such as Big Country, Nik Kershaw, Kool and The Gang and Wang Chung. The show was recorded for a Showtime concert special.
- The Who played on 18 August 1979: "The Who And Friends Roar In". This was the band's first major concert after the death of drummer Keith Moon the previous year following a series of smaller warm-ups.
- Simon and Garfunkel performed there on 19 June 1982.
- The Rolling Stones performed there in 1982, 1990, 1995 and 1999.
- Bruce Springsteen and the E Street Band played three times on the 1984–85 Born in the U.S.A. Tour, and twice in 1988, once during the Tunnel of Love Express Tour and the second time as a part of Human Rights Now!. The Tunnel of Love Express Tour date produced the biggest crowd for a concert at Wembley: 80,000 people. Springsteen was supposed to play two shows at Wembley but a scheduled Mike Tyson Boxing fight made that impossible as Wembley only took a certain amount of dates a year for football, concerts and sports. He also performed once in 2013 and once in 2016 at Wembley Stadium.
- Status Quo performed there in 1985, 1986 and 1991
- U2 performed 9 times between 1985 and 1997 including four nights on the 4th (European) leg of their "Zooropa" tour on 11–12 and 20–21 August 1993.
- Wham! played their last concert titled The Final on 28 June 1986.
- Rod Stewart performed there in 1986, 1991 and 1995
- Queen performed two nights on 11 and 12 July 1986, on The Magic Tour, with the concert on 12 July recorded for a live album with edited video released on VHS as Queen at Wembley and full version released on DVD as Queen: Live at Wembley Stadium. On 20 April 1992, The Freddie Mercury Tribute Concert took place at Wembley, a concert which featured the surviving members of Queen and various guests.
- David Bowie performed two nights on 19 and 20 June 1987, on his Glass Spider Tour.
- Genesis played four consecutive sold-out concerts on 1, 2, 3, and 4 July 1987, on the Invisible Touch Tour with a total attendance of more than 300,000. These were the last four shows for the band's major, sell-out world-tour in 1986–1987. The concert of 4 July 1987 had Prince Charles and his wife Diana in attendance. The shows were filmed and later released on DVD as Genesis Live at Wembley Stadium.
- Madonna had eight shows on 18, 19, 20 August 1987, 20, 21, 22 July 1990 and 25 and 26 September 1993.
- Pink Floyd performed two shows in August 1988, on the A Momentary Lapse of Reason Tour. World War II searchlights were used outside the stadium for dramatic effect for approaching fans.
- Cliff Richard performed two shows on 16 and 17 June 1989, celebrating 30 years of his music career in front of 144,000 people. The concerts were recorded and was released as From a Distance: The Event album and VHS/DVD. Guests included The Shadows, Aswad, Kalin Twins, The Searchers, Gerry and the Pacemakers, The Dallas Boys, The Vernons Girls, Stock Aitken Waterman, Tony Meehan and Jet Harris.
- Bros performed there on 19 August 1989, during their Bros in 2 Summer concert.
- Simple Minds played on 26 August 1989 as part of their Street Fighting Years tour.
- Fleetwood Mac played on 1 September 1990, as part of their Behind the Mask Tour.
- INXS had a concert on 13 July 1991 that was recorded and released as a VHS/DVD with the name Live Baby Live.
- Guns N' Roses performed there on 31 August 1991, and 13 June 1992, as part of their Use Your Illusion Tour. On the 13 June 1992 concert, Brian May was the special guest.
- Simply Red performed there on 11 and 12 July 1992.
- Prince performed there on 31 July 1993.
- Jean-Michel Jarre performed there on 28 August 1993.
- Van Halen performed there in June 1995.
- Bon Jovi played three consecutive nights in June 1995, which were filmed for Live from London. They also played on 19 and 20 August 2000, and were the last musical act to play at the old Wembley before it was closed.
- Tina Turner (4 sold-out concerts at Wembley Stadium, two in July 1996 and two in July 2000. Recorded during her Twenty Four Seven Tour for the One Last Time Live in Concert DVD in the year 2000).
- Eagles did 2 nights in 1996 as part of their Hell Freezes Over Tour.
- Bryan Adams in July 1996, in front of a crowd of over 70,000 people, performed his second sold out at the UK venue, the first on 18 July 1992, and is considered to be his most popular concert; the concert was broadcast on radio stations in 25 countries. From the evening of 27 July, the Wembley 1996 video was obtained.
- Delirious? and Noel Richards performed there on 28 June 1997.
- The Spice Girls had shows on 19 and 20 September 1998 to a crowd of 110,000; one was recorded and released as a VHS/DVD.
- The Bee Gees did the "One Night Only" Tour on 5 September 1998 to a crowd in excess of 56,000.
- Aerosmith with support from Lenny Kravitz were the guests at the Twin Towers Ball on 26 June 1999.
- Celine Dion performed twice, including 11 & 12 July 1999 as part of her Let's Talk About Love World Tour, performing to 80,000 people each night.
- Oasis performed twice, 21 and 22 July 2000, recorded their video and album Familiar to Millions at Wembley and were the last UK band to headline at the old Wembley.

== In popular culture ==
=== Literature ===
Cecil Freeman Gregg's crime novel Tragedy at Wembley (Methuen, 1936) sees his detective character Inspector Cuthbert Higgins investigate a murder at the stadium.

=== Cinema ===
The 1948 Olympic Marathon and the 1923 Stadium feature in the South Korean war film My Way (2011), though the marathon is clearly filmed in Riga, rather than London, and the stadium standing in for Wembley has an anachronistic electronic scoreboard.

The stadium also features in the 2001 mockumentary film Mike Bassett: England Manager.

In the 2018 Queen biopic Bohemian Rhapsody, the stadium was digitally recreated for the Live Aid scene. This was also done in the 2026 Michael Jackson biopic Michael, for the scene where Jackson performs Bad on his Bad tour in 1988.

=== Television ===
John Betjeman is shown standing in the Stadium in his 1973 BBC film Metroland, though, as John Bale has pointed out in Anti-Sport Sentiments in Literature: Batting for the Opposition (Routledge, 2007), he shows no real interest in Wembley's sporting connections, either here or elsewhere.

In Nigel Kneale's 1979 Quatermass, in which ancient stone circles turn out to be locations designed by aliens to harvest young humans, the Stadium is said to have been built on the site of a stone circle ("the Sacred Turf they call it", says Professor Quatermass, "I wonder what's underneath?")

=== Urban myth ===
There is a persistent myth that a small locomotive met with a mishap when Watkin's Folly was being demolished, or the Empire Stadium built, and was buried under what became the "sacred turf" (though in some versions it is a carriage filled with rubble). When the stadium was rebuilt no locomotive or carriage (or stone circle...) was found, though the foundations of Watkin's tower were.

Events and tenants
Preceded by Stamford Bridge	FA Cup; Final venue 1923–2000	Succeeded by Millennium Stadium; Cardiff
Preceded by Olympiastadion; Berlin	Summer Olympics; Main venue (Olympic Stadium); 1948	Succeeded by Helsingin olympiastadion Helsinki
Preceded by Olympiastadion; Berlin	Summer Olympics; Athletics competitions Main venue 1948	Succeeded by Helsingin olympiastadion Helsinki
Preceded by Olympiastadion; Berlin	Summer Olympics; Men's football final venue 1948	Succeeded by Helsingin olympiastadion Helsinki
Preceded by Olympisch Stadion; Amsterdam	European Cup; Final venue 1963	Succeeded by Praterstadion; Vienna
Preceded by Heysel Stadium; Brussels	European Cup Winners' Cup; Final venue 1965	Succeeded by Hampden Park; Glasgow
Preceded by Four venues used for the 1962 FIFA World Cup, when the first matches were all played at the same time	FIFA World Cup; Opening venue 1966	Succeeded by Estadio Azteca; Mexico City
Preceded by Estadio Nacional de Chile; Santiago	FIFA World Cup; Final venue 1966	Succeeded by Estadio Azteca; Mexico City
Preceded by Estádio Nacional; Lisbon (Oeiras)	European Cup; Final venue 1968	Succeeded by Estadio Santiago Bernabéu; Madrid
Preceded by San Siro; Milan	European Cup; Final venue 1971	Succeeded by De Kuip; Rotterdam
Preceded by Stadio Olimpico; Rome	European Cup; Final venue 1978	Succeeded by Olympiastadion; Munich
Preceded by Toso Pavilion; Santa Clara	World Games; Main venue 1985	Succeeded by Wildparkstadion; Karlsruhe
Preceded by Stadio San Nicola; Bari	European Cup; Final venue 1992	Succeeded by Olympiastadion; Munich
Preceded by Eden Park; Auckland	Rugby League World Cup; Final venue 1992 and 1995	Succeeded by Old Trafford; Manchester
Preceded by Estádio da Luz; Lisbon	European Cup Winners' Cup; Final venue 1993	Succeeded by Parken Stadium; Copenhagen
Preceded by Ullevi; Gothenburg	UEFA European Championship; Final venue 1996	Succeeded by De Kuip; Rotterdam
