= Twin Towers, Wembley =

Twin Towers
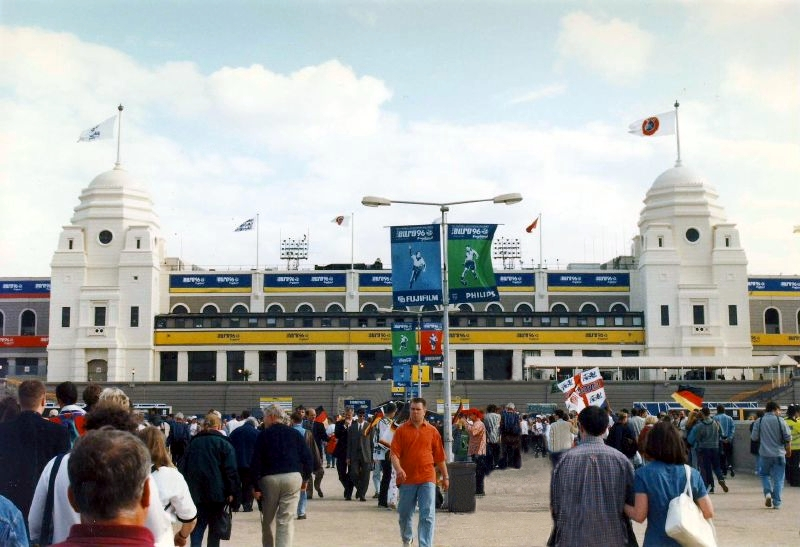
- The Twin Towers at Euro 1996
- Interactive map of the Twin Towers area
- Former names: Twin Towers at Wembley

General information
- Status: Demolished
- Type: Football stadium
- Classification: Grade II
- Location: Wembley, London, England
- Coordinates: 51°33′20″N 0°16′47″W
- Groundbreaking: 1922
- Completed: 1923
- Closed: 2000
- Demolished: 2003
- Owner: The Football Association

Height
- Height: 124 ft (38 m)

Technical details
- Material: ferro-concrete

Design and construction
- Architect: Sir Robert McAlpine
- Known for: Wembley Stadium

The Twin Towers were part of the original Wembley Stadium in London, England. They were constructed in 1923 on the site of Watkin's Tower in Wembley, and came to be recognised as one of the iconic symbols of English football in general and of Wembley Stadium in particular. They became grade II listed buildings in 1976. They were demolished in 2003 to make way for the new Wembley Stadium.

== Construction ==
The towers were designed by Sir Robert McAlpine for the construction of Empire Stadium (later known as Wembley Stadium) in time for the British Empire Exhibition on the site of the demolished Watkin's Tower. They were 126 feet (38 m) high and built of ferro-concrete with concrete flagpoles topped with concrete crowns constructed above them. Initially they were only intended to be a temporary construction, and the plan was to demolish them after the exhibition, but the chairman of the exhibition committee Sir James Stevenson requested that they be preserved.

The towers continued to remain a part of Wembley Stadium and they became a distinctive symbol of Wembley, framing the approach to the stadium from Wembley Park tube station to the north. They were world-famous as the landmark symbols of Wembley Stadium.

The Twin Towers were granted Grade II listed status in 1976. As they were originally built as temporary structures, and were "treated to resemble masonry", several alterations were required over the years to preserve the Twin Towers.

== Demolition ==
In 1994, there were rumours that Wembley Stadium would be redeveloped to build a new English national stadium. English Heritage responded critically to the reports, writing to Brent London Borough Council stating that they expected the Twin Towers to be preserved but would not object to the rest of the stadium being demolished. In 1998, the Football Association considered plans on how to update Wembley and replacement was considered the best option, despite an offer from Arsenal to buy the stadium and restore it. When the new designs were unveiled, it was announced that the Twin Towers would be demolished to make way for the new 90,000 capacity stadium. The reasons given to English Heritage were that they would be in the middle of the pitch of the new stadium plans and served no practical purpose. The Minister for Sport, Tony Banks described them dismissively as "concrete blocks".

It was also suggested that it would be impractical to move the towers elsewhere because the ferro-concrete would crumble easily and unevenly, making it impossible for them to be dismantled and reassembled somewhere else in any solid form. English Heritage opposed the demolition and Brent London Borough Council stated that they would not approve any new stadium that did not include the Twin Towers. Brent Council later granted planning permission on the understanding that the Twin Towers would be preserved, however the final designs for the new stadium reverted to the originals without the Twin Towers in place. English Heritage also withdrew their objections, thus paving the way for the Twin Towers to be demolished. Proposals in early 2000 to move the towers to Widnes, to become part of a new national rugby league museum, were not realised.

The Twin Towers were the last structure of Wembley to be demolished. Preliminary demolition work started in December 2002 with the concrete crowns being removed from the top of the flagpoles. The towers were demolished in 2003 by a large Liebherr 974 crawler excavator referred to as "Goliath" and nicknamed "Alan the Shearer", made in Germany specifically for the task. The original foundations of Watkin's Tower were rediscovered during the demolition. The top of one of the towers was moved to be installed as a memorial at St Raphael's Estate, Neasden, and the "iconic" tower flagpoles are now located at the late Sir William McAlpine's Fawley Hill estate.
