= Watkin's Tower =

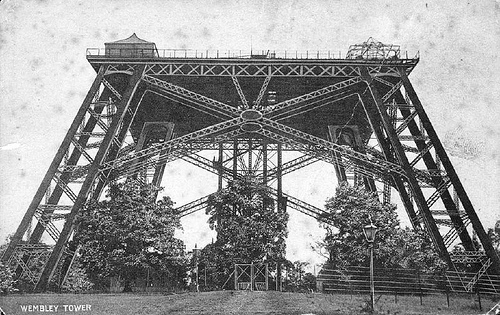
- The first and only completed stage of Watkin's Wembley Tower, c. 1900
- Interactive map of the Watkin's Tower area

General information
- Status: Never completed
- Type: Observation tower
- Location: Wembley Park, Middlesex, England
- Coordinates: 51°33′20″N 0°16′46″W
- Construction started: 1891
- Completed: 1894
- Opening: May 1896
- Demolished: 1907

Height
- Antenna spire: Original: 358 m (1,175 ft); Finally: ~47 m (154 ft)

Design and construction
- Architect: Sir Benjamin Baker
- Developer: Stewart, MacLaren and Dunn
- Main contractor: Metropolitan Tower Construction Company

Watkin's Tower was a partially completed iron lattice tower in Wembley Park, Middlesex, England. Its construction was an ambitious project to create a 358-metre (1,175 ft)-high visitor attraction in Wembley Park to the north of the city, led by the railway entrepreneur Sir Edward Watkin. Marketed as the "Great Tower of London," it was designed to surpass the height of the Eiffel Tower in Paris, and it was part of Wembley Park's emergence as a recreational space. The tower was never completed and it was demolished in 1907. The site of the tower is now occupied by the English national football ground, Wembley Stadium.

== Names ==
Numerous names and nicknames were given to the tower during its planning, construction and legacy. These include Watkin's Tower, Watkin's Folly, the Wembley Park Tower, the Wembley Tower, the Metropolitan Tower, and the London Stump.

== History ==
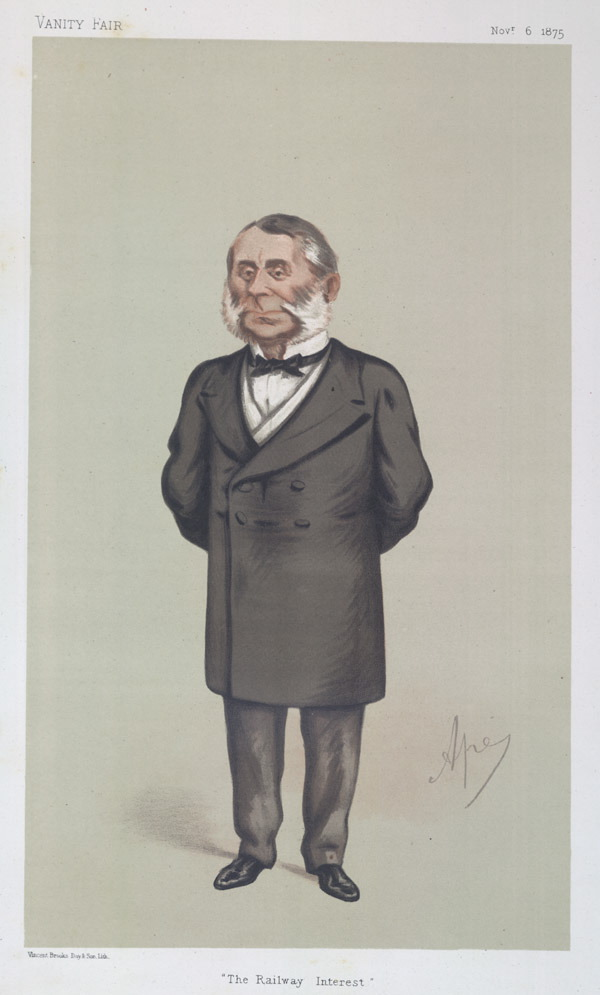
A caricature of Watkin by "Ape", published in Vanity Fair in 1875.

Sir Edward Watkin (1819–1901) was a British Member of Parliament and railway entrepreneur, noted for being chairman of nine different British railway companies. He was an ambitious visionary, and presided over large-scale railway engineering projects to fulfil his business aspirations. He began work on the construction of a channel tunnel under the English Channel, with the aim of connecting his lines to the railway network in France, and successfully opened the Great Central Main Line. Although his channel tunnel project failed in 1881, Watkin remained a driven innovator, inspired by grand schemes which could augment his railway empire.

Among his numerous railway executive appointments, Watkin was chairman of the Metropolitan Railway (MR), an expanding London transport company which was later to become the Metropolitan line of the present-day London Underground system. Watkin was keen to attract more passengers onto his trains and was aggressively extending his railway into Buckinghamshire. He also considered transporting Londoners out into the countryside as a business opportunity and needed a major attraction to lure the crowds out of the city and onto his trains. To this end, Watkin purchased a tract of land near a rural Middlesex hamlet called Wembley, adjacent to the route of the Metropolitan Railway, with the goal of building an amusement park laid out with boating lakes, a waterfall, ornamental gardens (the park land had previously been landscaped by Humphry Repton and known as Wembley Park in the 18th century), and cricket and football pitches. The crowning glory of Watkin's amusement park was to be a soaring metal tower which would be centrepiece of the pleasure park and would offer panoramic views of the surrounding countryside, just 12 minutes from Baker Street station.

The paying public was to gain access to Wembley Park and its tower by train, arriving at the new Wembley Park station which the Metropolitan Railway constructed specially for the attraction, incorporating additional platforms to handle the large crowds which Watkin confidently anticipated would flock to the park. The station opened in 1893–4.

=== Design and construction ===
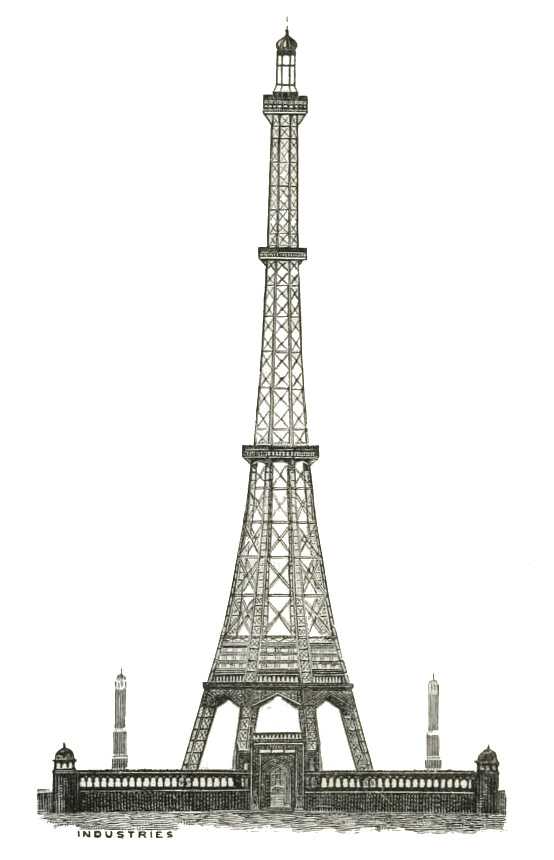
The winning design of Watkin's Tower (proposal number 37), later scrapped in favour of a four-legged design

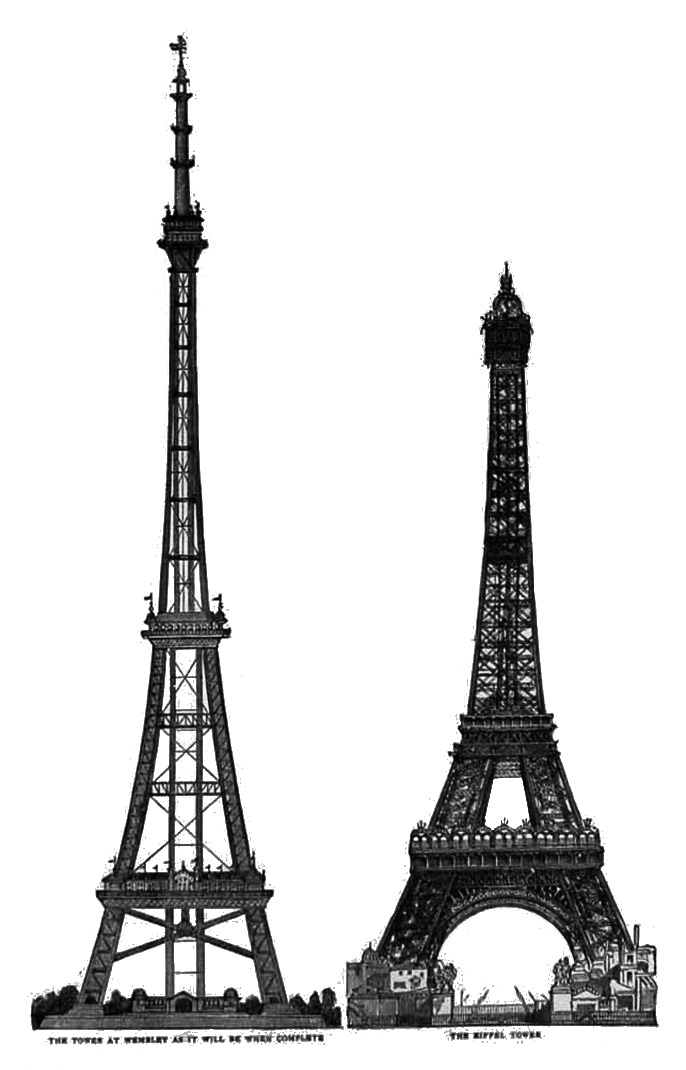
The final four-legged design of Watkin's Tower (Eiffel Tower on the right for comparison)

Inspired by the construction of the Eiffel Tower in Paris, France, Watkin invited Gustave Eiffel himself to design the tower, but the Frenchman declined – replying that if he designed the tower, the French people "would not think me so good a Frenchman as I hope I am."

An architectural design competition was held in 1890, and a total of 68 designs were submitted. Some of the more exotic proposals included a £1m tower inspired by the Leaning Tower of Pisa; a structure with "a captive parachute to hold four persons"; and a tower with a spiral railway climbing its exterior. One design included a 1/12-scale model of the Great Pyramid of Giza, envisioned as a "colony of aerial vegetarians, who would grow their own food in hanging gardens."

The winning entry, number 37, was submitted by Stewart, MacLaren and Dunn of London. They proposed an eight-legged 1,200-foot (366 m) metal tower – 45.8 metres (150 ft) taller than the Eiffel Tower, which was 312.2 metres (1,024 ft) at the time. It was to have two observation decks – each with restaurants, theatres, dancing rooms and exhibitions – winter gardens, Victorian Turkish baths and a 90-bedroom hotel. The top of the tower, reached by a system of lifts, was to provide a fresh-air sanatorium and an astronomical observatory, taking advantage of the clearer air offered by the altitude. The entire structure was to be illuminated by electric light.

Watkin`s right-hand man, Robert William Perks (1849–1934), registered two companies to manage the project: The Tower Company Limited (registered 14 August 1889); and The International Tower Construction Company Limited (registered 13 August 1891). The second company changed its name in October 1891 to "The Metropolitan Tower Construction Company Limited." To oversee construction Watkin appointed Benjamin Baker, a civil engineer who was involved in the design of the Forth Bridge and the Aswan Dam. After only modestly successful appeals for public subscription, the companies embarked on the construction project with limited funds: Watkin commissioned a redesign and the octagonal design was scaled back to a cheaper, four-legged design that bore much more resemblance to the Eiffel Tower. The foundations were laid in 1892 and construction work commenced in June 1893. At the same time, the surrounding park began to be laid out with a cricket pitch and a boating lake, in readiness for the first visitors.

=== Opening and demolition ===
Wembley Park officially opened to the public in May 1894, although construction of the tower was still underway and the first stage had not yet been completed. Nevertheless, the park attracted 12,000 visitors during 1895 and was proving to be a popular attraction for Londoners. In September 1895 the first stage of the tower was completed, standing at approximately 47 metres (154 ft) high. At this time, work was behind schedule as Watkin retired through ill health. It was soon discovered that the structure's foundations were unsteady – the reduction in the number of the tower's legs, carried out to reduce costs, had resulted in increased pressure on each leg and this was causing subsidence.

Over the next few years, the Metropolitan Tower Construction Company experienced financial problems and went into voluntary liquidation in 1898, with its shareholders receiving shares in The Tower Company Limited. Work stopped, and the tower was never completed. Watkin died in 1901, and with halted construction, the "unsafe" site was closed to the public the following year. Between 1904 and 1907, the completed section of the tower was demolished using dynamite.

Despite the failure and destruction of Watkin's star attraction, Wembley Park continued to flourish as a popular recreation venue, offering football, cricket, cycling, rowing, athletics and, in winter, ice skating on the frozen lake. By the end of World War I, over a hundred sports clubs used the Wembley facilities. In order to recoup its losses, the Tower Company refocused to housebuilding and changed its name to "The Wembley Park Estate Company" in 1906, laying out the Wembley suburb with exclusive homes and a golf course. Under its new title, the Company obtained an official quotation on the London Stock Exchange in 1907. R. W. Perks sold the bulk of his shares in the company in September 1914, but his wife maintained a smaller-scale holding until the winding-up of the company in 1930-31.

After the war, Wembley was selected as the site for the 1924 British Empire Exhibition and the park land was purchased from the Metropolitan Railway company. Among the pavilions and halls designed for the exhibition by John William Simpson, Maxwell Ayrton and Owen Williams was a grand sports arena, the 125,000-capacity British Empire Exhibition Stadium, later to be known as Wembley Stadium. It was built on the site of Watkin's Tower, covering its foundations, and opened in 1923. It later became the home ground of the England national football team. When the original stadium was rebuilt in 2000–2003, the lowering of the level of the pitch resulted in the concrete foundations of the tower being rediscovered on the stadium site underneath the Twin Towers.

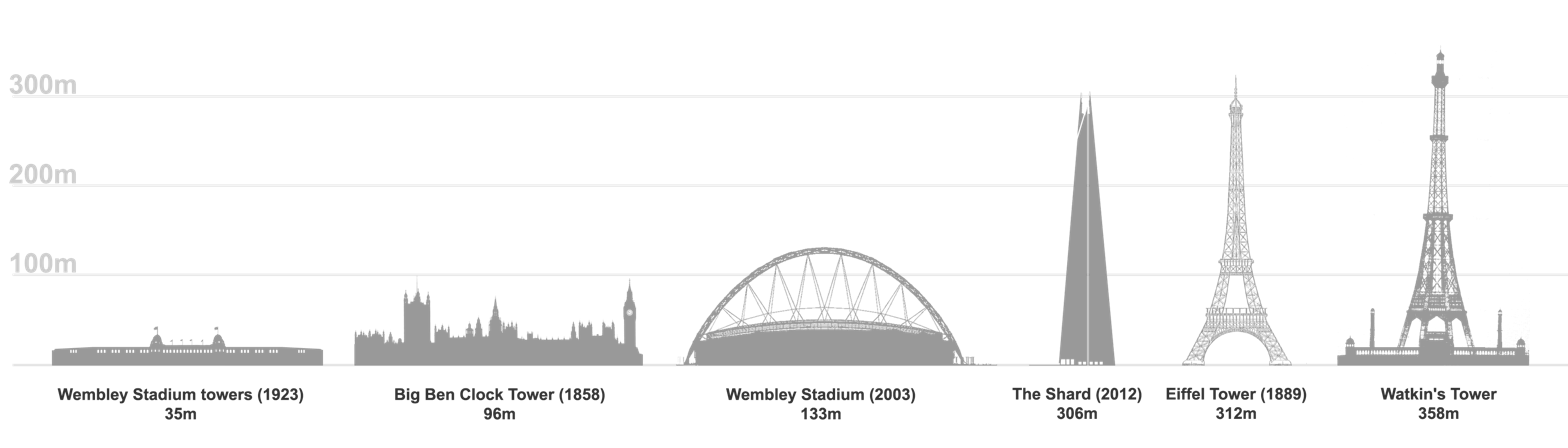
A comparative diagram of Watkin's Tower with the Eiffel tower and London buildings

== Legacy ==
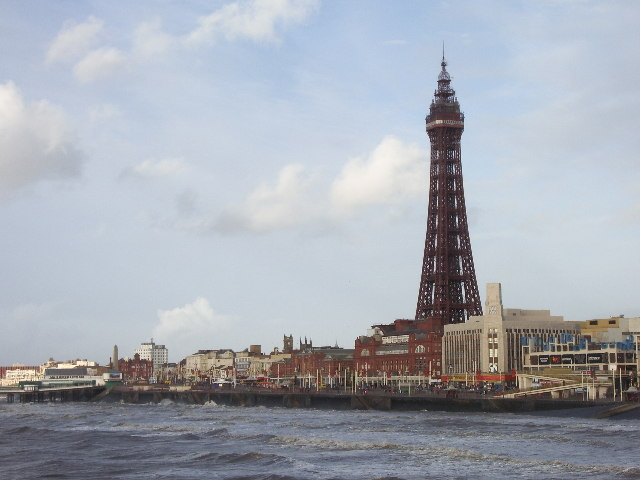
Blackpool Tower (erected 1894)

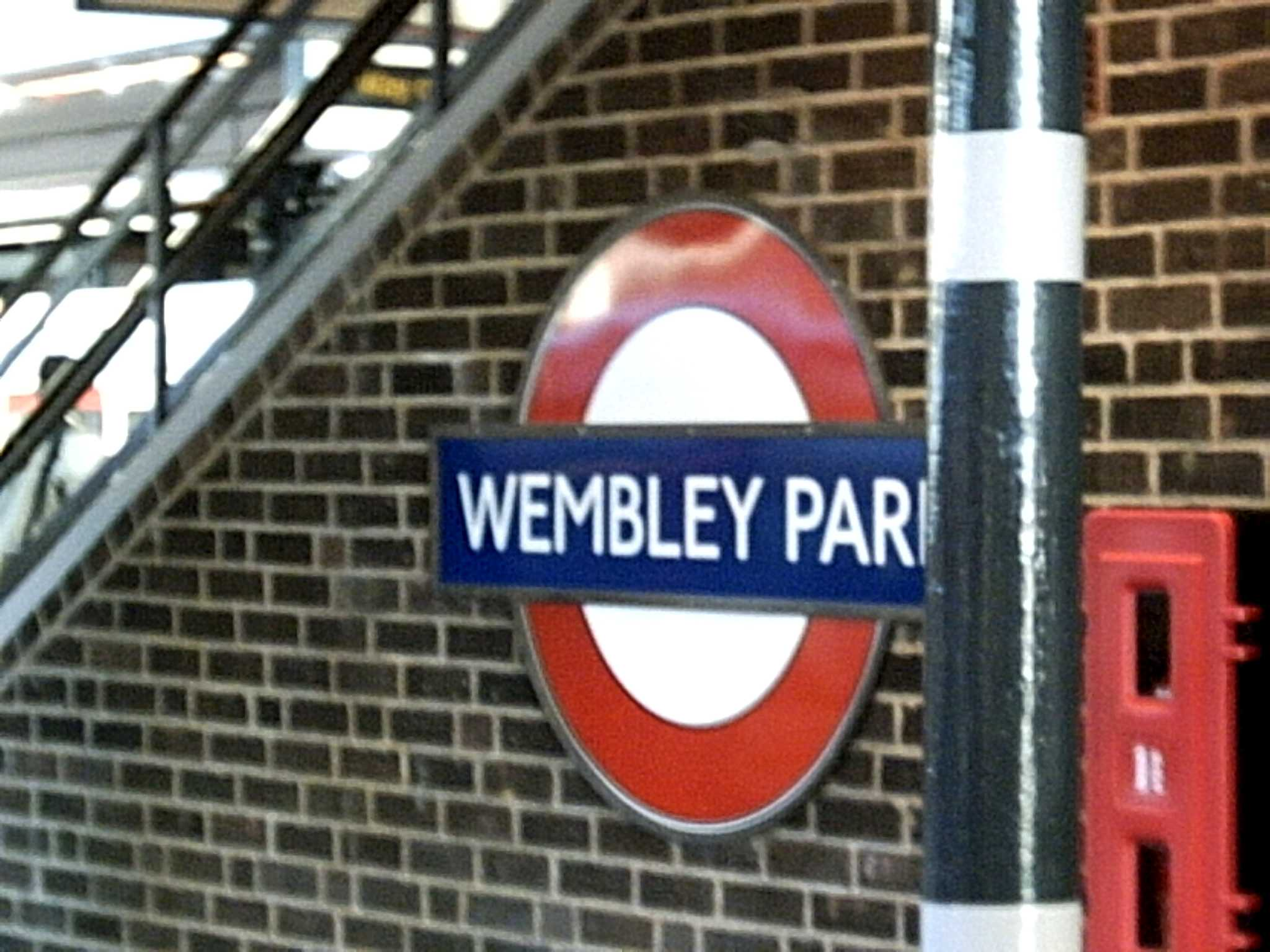
Wembley Park station, originally opened to bring visitors to Watkin's Tower

Watkin's Tower was not the last attempt to build a notable British tower. In the north west of England, the Blackpool Tower (opened 1894), New Brighton Tower (opened 1898) and Morecambe Tower (1898) were also built, although only the Blackpool Tower remains standing. In October 1891, the "Brighton Eiffel Tower and Winter Gardens Company Limited" was registered to build a tower "in or near" Brighton in Sussex, but does not appear to have succeeded in raising significant funds to proceed with the project.

Although Watkin's tower has gone, Wembley Park continues to attract large crowds to sporting and musical events at Wembley Stadium, and it served as a venue for both the 1948 and 2012 Summer Olympics. The station built by the Metropolitan Railway remains in service to this day, providing a major transport link for Wembley crowds via the London Underground Metropolitan and Jubilee lines.

The story of Watkin's Tower was recounted briefly in the 1973 BBC documentary by the then Poet Laureate, Sir John Betjeman, Metro-land. In the programme, Betjeman described Watkin's vision of creating an engineering wonder in a little-known rural area north of London:

Beyond Neasden there was an unimportant hamlet where for years the Metropolitan didn't stop. Wembley. Slushy fields and grass farms. Then out of the mist arose Sir Edward Watkin's dream: an Eiffel Tower for London.

— Sir John Betjeman, Metro-Land

The programme also showed some of the unsuccessful designs for the tower. The script for Metro-land can be found in Betjeman's England, a collection of writings by John Betjeman published in 2009.

The history of Watkin's Tower is also showcased in the Brent Museum located in Willesden Green Library. The museum formerly allowed visitors to build a tower before it came tumbling down because of the vibrating floor, however, this has been removed since the renovation of the library in 2015.
