= 2013 Rugby League World Cup Group A =

2013 Rugby League World Cup Group A is one of the four groups in the 2013 Rugby League World Cup. The group comprises Australia, England, Fiji and Ireland.

== Ladder ==
Team	Pld	W	D	L	TF	PF	PA	+/−	Pts
Australia	3	3	0	0	20	112	22	+90	6
England	3	2	0	1	18	96	40	+56	4
Fiji	3	1	0	2	8	46	82	–36	2
Ireland	3	0	0	3	3	14	124	–110	0

All times are local – UTC+0/GMT in English venues. UTC+1/CET in French venues. UTC+0/WET in Irish venues. UTC+0/GMT in Welsh venues.

== Australia vs England ==
26 October 2013
14:30

Australia	28–20	England
Try: Thurston 27' c Bird 37' c Slater 40' c B. Morris 44' m Boyd 71' m Goal: Thurston (4/6) 27', 37', 40', 64'	Report	Try: Hall 8' m Cudjoe 20' c G. Burgess 51' c Charnley 76' m Goal: Sinfield (2/4) 20', 51'

Millennium Stadium, Cardiff
Attendance: 45,052
Referee: Henry Perenara (New Zealand)
Player of the Match: Johnathan Thurston (Australia)

FB	1	Billy Slater
RW	2	Brett Morris
RC	3	Brent Tate
LC	4	Greg Inglis
LW	5	Darius Boyd
SO	6	Johnathan Thurston
SH	7	Cooper Cronk
PR	8	Matt Scott
HK	9	Cameron Smith (c)
PR	10	James Tamou
SR	11	Greg Bird
SR	12	Sam Thaiday
LF	13	Paul Gallen
Substitutions:
IC	14	Robbie Farah
IC	15	Andrew Fifita
IC	16	Luke Lewis
IC	17	Corey Parker
Coach:
(Australia) Tim Sheens

FB	1	Sam Tomkins
RW	2	Josh Charnley
RC	3	Kallum Watkins
LC	4	Leroy Cudjoe
LW	5	Ryan Hall
SO	6	Rangi Chase
SH	7	Kevin Sinfield (c)
PR	8	Chris Hill
HK	9	James Roby
PR	10	George Burgess
SR	11	Brett Ferres
SR	12	Ben Westwood
LF	13	Sam Burgess
Substitutions:
IC	14	Gareth Widdop
IC	15	Carl Ablett
IC	16	Tom Burgess
IC	17	Lee Mossop
Coach:
(England) Steve McNamara

Touch Judges:
Robert Hicks (England)
Grant Atkins (Australia)
Video Referee:
Ben Thaler (England)

Note: The match between Australia and England was the opening match of the World Cup, and was held at the Millennium Stadium in Cardiff as part of a double-header with Wales vs Italy.

== Fiji vs Ireland ==
28 October 2013
20:00

Fiji	32–14	Ireland
Try: Uate (3) 9' m, 64 m, 71 m K. Naiqama 12' c T. Sims 52' c K. Sims 65' m Goal: W. Naiqama (4/7) 12', 38', 52', 65'	Report	Try: McCarthy 23' m Blanch 76' m Hasson 79' c Goal: Richards (1/3) 80'

Spotland Stadium, Rochdale
Attendance: 8,872
Referee: Phil Bentham (England)
Player of the Match: Kevin Naiqama (Fiji)

FB	1	Kevin Naiqama
RW	2	Marika Koroibete
RC	3	Sisa Waqa
LC	4	Wes Naiqama
LW	5	Akuila Uate
SO	6	Alipate Noilea
SH	7	Aaron Groom
PR	8	Ashton Sims
HK	9	James Storer
PR	10	Petero Civoniceva (c)
SR	11	Tariq Sims
SR	12	Jayson Bukuya
LF	13	Korbin Sims
Substitutes
IC	14	Apisai Koroisau
IC	15	Eloni Vunakece
IC	16	Kane Evans
IC	17	Vitale Junior Roqica
Coach:
(Australia) Rick Stone

FB	1	Scott Grix
RW	2	Damien Blanch
RC	3	Stuart Littler
LC	4	Api Pewhairangi
LW	5	Pat Richards
SO	6	James Mendeika
SH	7	Liam Finn (c)
PR	8	Brett White
HK	9	Rory Kostjasyn
PR	10	Eamon O'Carroll
SR	11	Tyrone McCarthy
SR	12	David Allen
LF	13	Ben Currie
Substitutes
IC	14	Bob Beswick
IC	15	James Hasson
IC	16	Kurt Haggerty
IC	17	Anthony Mullally
Coach:
(England) Mark Aston

Touch Judges:
Mark Craven (England)
Tony Martin (England)
Video Referee:
Henry Perenara (New Zealand)

== England vs Ireland ==
2 November 2013
14:30

England	42–0	Ireland
Try: Hall (3) 2' m, 13' c, 22' m Briscoe (2) 17' m, 19' c Ferres 24' c Watkins 57' c Chase 69' c Goal: Sinfield (4/7) 14', 20', 24', 57'; Widdop (1/1) 69'	Report

John Smith's Stadium, Huddersfield
Attendance: 24,375*
Referee: Thierry Alibert (France)
Player of the Match: Ryan Hall (England)

FB	1	Sam Tomkins
RW	2	Tom Briscoe
RC	3	Kallum Watkins
LC	4	Leroy Cudjoe
LW	5	Ryan Hall
SO	6	Rangi Chase
SH	7	Kevin Sinfield (c)
PR	8	Chris Hill
HK	9	James Roby
PR	10	George Burgess
SR	11	Brett Ferres
SR	12	Ben Westwood
LF	13	Sean O'Loughlin
Substitutes
IC	14	Gareth Widdop
IC	15	Carl Ablett
IC	16	Tom Burgess
IC	17	James Graham
Coach:
(England) Steve McNamara

FB	1	James Mendeika
RW	2	Damien Blanch
RC	3	Stuart Littler
LC	4	Apirana Pewhairangi
LW	5	Pat Richards
SO	6	Ben Currie
SH	7	Liam Finn (c)
PR	8	Brett White
HK	9	Rory Kostjasyn
PR	10	James Hasson
SR	11	Simon Finnigan
SR	12	David Allen
LF	13	Tyrone McCarthy
Substitutes
IC	14	Bob Beswick
IC	15	Luke Ambler
IC	16	Danny Bridge
IC	17	Anthony Mullally
Coach:
(England) Mark Aston

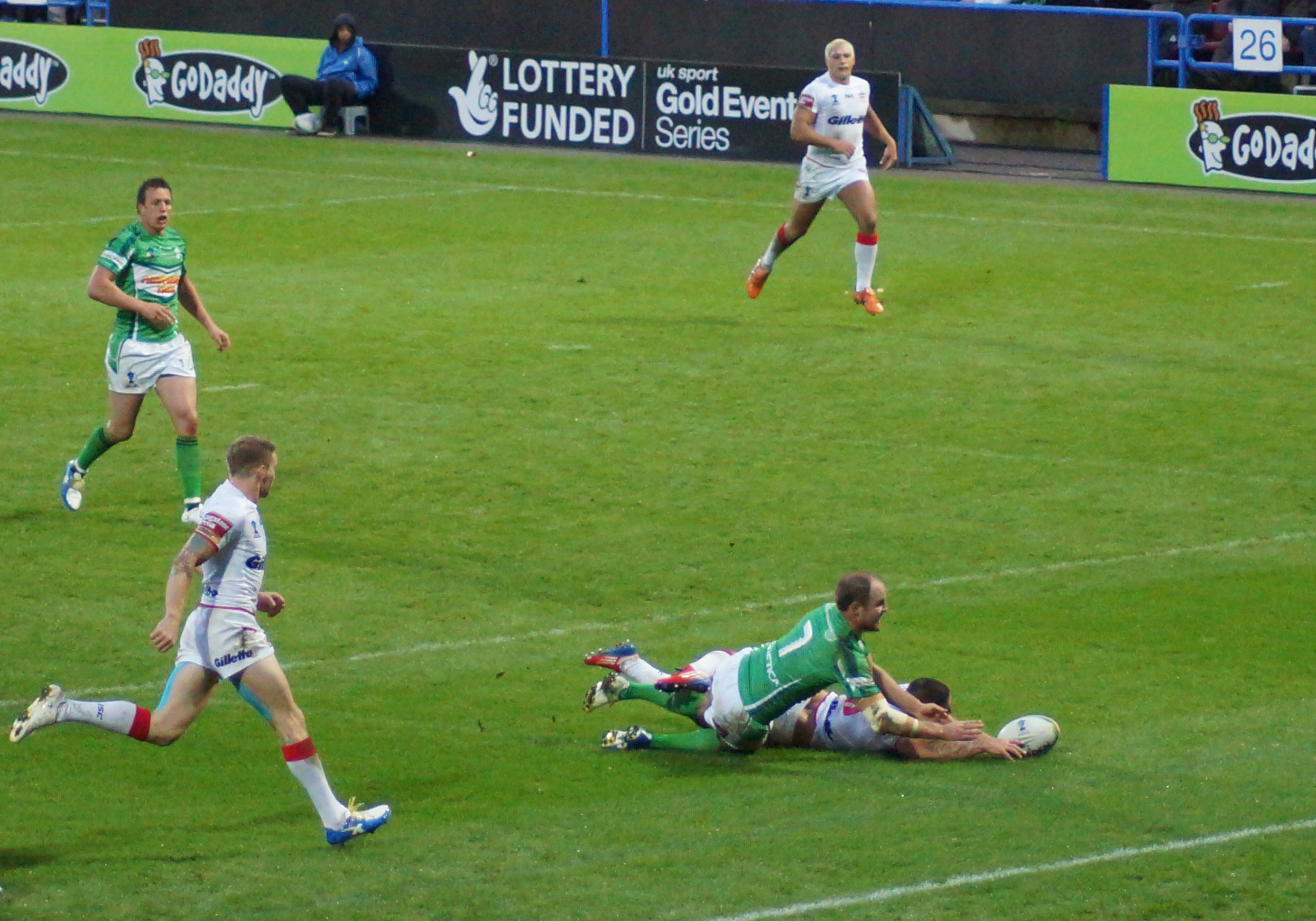

Touch Judges:
Jamal Thompson (New Zealand)
Jose Pereira (France)
Video Referee:
Henry Perenara (New Zealand)

- The Attendance of 24,375 is still a stadium record crowd at the John Smiths Stadium

== Australia vs Fiji ==
2 November 2013
20:00

Australia	34–2	Fiji
Try: Papalii 15'c Boyd 21' m Jennings 31' c Morris 42' c Cherry-Evans 52' c Lewis 66' c Goal: Thurston (5/6) 15', 31', 42', 52', 67'	Report	Goal: Noilea (1/1) 7'

Langtree Park, St. Helens
Attendance: 14,137
Referee: Richard Silverwood (England)
Player of the Match: Johnathan Thurston (Australia)

FB	1	Greg Inglis
RW	2	Jarryd Hayne
RC	3	Josh Morris
LC	4	Michael Jennings
LW	5	Darius Boyd
SO	6	Johnathan Thurston
SH	7	Daly Cherry-Evans
PR	8	Matt Scott
HK	9	Cameron Smith (c)
PR	10	James Tamou
SR	11	Luke Lewis
SR	12	Josh Papalii
LF	13	Nate Myles
Substitutes
IC	14	Boyd Cordner
IC	15	Robbie Farah
IC	16	Andrew Fifita
IC	17	Paul Gallen
Coach:
(Australia) Tim Sheens

FB	1	Kevin Naiqama
RW	2	Marika Koroibete
RC	3	Sisa Waqa
LC	4	Daryl Millard
LW	5	Akuila Uate
SO	6	Alipate Noilea
SH	7	Aaron Groom
PR	8	Ashton Sims
HK	9	James Storer
PR	10	Petero Civoniceva
SR	11	Tariq Sims
SR	12	Jason Bukuya
LF	13	Korbin Sims
Substitutes
IC	14	Apisai Koroisau
IC	15	Eloni Vunakece
IC	16	Kane Evans
IC	17	Vitale Junior Roqica
Coach:
(Australia) Rick Stone

Touch Judges:
James Child (England)
Tim Roby (England)
Video Referee:
Ben Thaler (England)

== England vs Fiji ==
9 November 2013
14:30

England	34–12	Fiji
Try: Westwood 38' c S. Burgess 41' c Ferres 44' c Hall (2) 49' c, 56' m Burrow 53' c Goal: Sinfield (5/6) 38', 43', 45', 49', 53'	Report	Try: Vunakece 33' c Radradra 72' c Goal: Naiqama (2/2) 34', 73'

KC Stadium, Hull
Attendance: 25,114
Referee: Ben Cummins (Australia)
Player of the Match: Sam Burgess (England)

FB	1	Sam Tomkins
RW	2	Tom Briscoe
RC	3	Kallum Watkins
LC	4	Leroy Cudjoe
LW	5	Ryan Hall
SO	6	Rangi Chase
SH	7	Kevin Sinfield (c)
PR	8	James Graham
HK	9	Michael McIlorum
PR	10	Sam Burgess
SR	11	Brett Ferres
SR	12	Ben Westwood
LF	13	Sean O'Loughlin
Substitutes
IC	14	Rob Burrow
IC	15	Liam Farrell
IC	16	Chris Hill
IC	17	George Burgess
Coach:
(England) Steve McNamara

FB	1	Kevin Naiqama
RW	2	Marika Koroibete
RC	3	Daryl Millard
LC	4	Wes Naiqama
LW	5	Semi Radradra
SO	6	Ryan Millard
SH	7	Aaron Groom
PR	8	Ashton Sims
HK	9	James Storer
PR	10	Petero Civoniceva (c)
SR	11	Jason Bukuya
SR	12	Tariq Sims
LF	13	Korbin Sims
Substitutes
IC	14	Eloni Vunakece
IC	15	Peni Botiki
IC	16	Vitale Junior Roqica
IC	17	Kane Evans
Coach:
(Australia) Rick Stone

Touch Judges:
Jamal Thompson (New Zealand)
Grant Atkins (Australia)
Video Referee:
Shayne Hayne (Australia)

== Australia vs Ireland ==
9 November 2013
20:00

Australia	50–0	Ireland
Try: Hayne (2) 2' m, 76' c Cronk (2) 11' c, 57' c Bird 29' c Morris 32' c Slater 40' m Cherry-Evans 60' c Fifita 65' c Goal: Smith (3/5) 11', 30', 33'; Parker (4/4) 57', 60', 66', 76'	Report

Thomond Park, Limerick
Attendance: 5,021
Referee: Phil Bentham (England)
Player of the Match: Daly Cherry-Evans

FB	1	Billy Slater
RW	2	Brett Morris
RC	3	Josh Morris
LC	4	Brent Tate
LW	5	Jarryd Hayne
SO	6	Daly Cherry-Evans
SH	7	Cooper Cronk
PR	8	Paul Gallen
HK	9	Cameron Smith (c)
PR	10	James Tamou
SR	11	Greg Bird
SR	12	Sam Thaiday
LF	13	Nate Myles
Substitutes
IC	14	Boyd Cordner
IC	15	Robbie Farah
IC	16	Andrew Fifita
IC	17	Corey Parker
Coach:
(Australia) Tim Sheens

FB	1	Scott Grix
RW	2	Damien Blanch
RC	3	Stuart Littler
LC	4	Joshua Toole
LW	5	Pat Richards
SO	6	James Mendeika
SH	7	Liam Finn (c)
PR	8	Brett White
HK	9	Rory Kostjasyn
PR	10	Anthony Mullally
SR	11	Tyrone McCarthy
SR	12	David Allen
LF	13	Simon Finnigan
Substitutes
IC	14	Bob Beswick
IC	15	James Hasson
IC	16	Ben Currie
IC	17	Luke Ambler
Coach:
(England) Mark Aston

Touch Judges:
Joe Cobb (England)
George Stokes (England)
Video Referee:
Thierry Alibert (France)
