= Richard Silverwood =

English rugby league referee (born 1976)

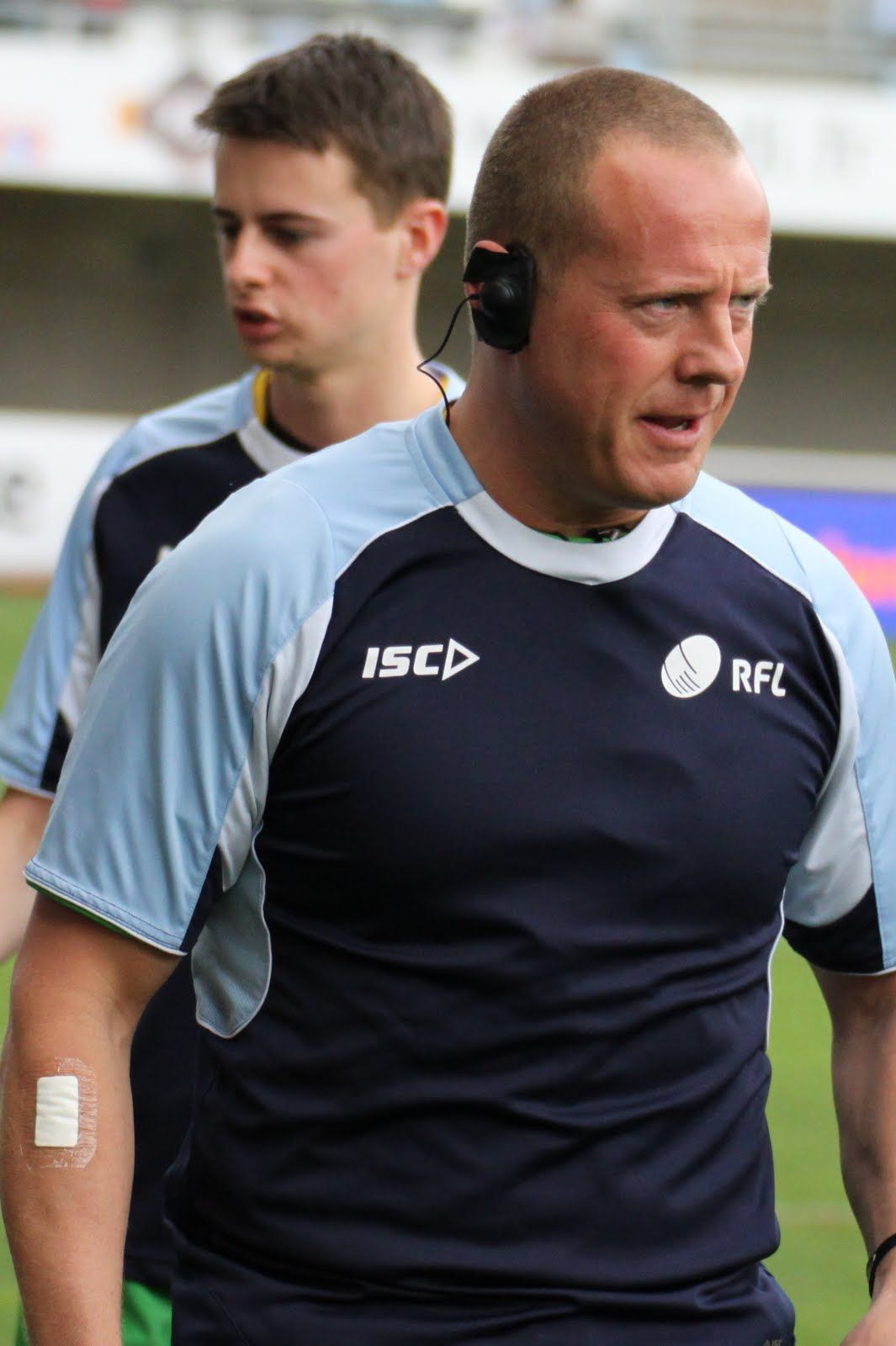

Personal information
- Born: 1976 (age 48–49); Dewsbury, West Yorkshire, England

Refereeing information
Years	Competition	Apps
2001–16	Super League	432
2006–16	Challenge Cup	3
2010–16	World Club Challenge	3
2005–13	Internationals	18
- Source: As of 17 October 2009

Richard Silverwood (born 1976, in Dewsbury, England) is a retired international rugby league referee. He officiated in the Super League competition as one of the Rugby Football League's Full Time Match Officials until his retirement whilst suspended in July 2016.

== First games ==
Silverwood's first professional game was York - Batley Bulldogs on 28 March 1999.

His first Super League game was Halifax - Salford City Reds on 6 May 2001.

He had refereed 304 Super League games as of the end of 2012.

He was Rugby Football League's referee of the year in 2006.

== Challenge Cup ==
Silverwood refereed the Challenge Cup Final in 2006, 2010 and 2012.

== Super League Grand Final ==
Silverwood refereed the Super League Grand Final in 2010, 2012 and 2013.

== World Club Challenge ==
Silverwood refereed the World Club Challenge in 2010, 2015, and 2016.

== International ==
Silverwood refereed four Australia v New Zealand Anzac Tests in 2009, 2010, 2011 and 2012.

He also refereed Australia v New Zealand in the 4 Nations in 2010.

He refereed the 2013 Rugby League World Cup final.

== Suspensions ==
Silverwood was suspended three times by the Rugby Football League, in 2009, 2011 and at the time of his retirement in 2016.
