= List of Ireland national rugby league team players =

This is a list of rugby league footballers who have represented the Ireland national rugby league team.

== Players ==
- Up to and including against Wales in the 2017 Rugby League World Cup at Perth Oval on 12 November 2017

Name	Date of debut	Opponent	Year of final game	Caps	Tries	Goals	Drop goals	Points
Ian Devery	13 August 1995	Scotland	1995	1	0	5	0	10
Dolan Joyce	13 August 1995	Scotland	1995	1	0	0	0	0
Rickey Smith	13 August 1995	Scotland	1995	4	1	0	0	4
Lee Child	13 August 1995	Scotland	1998	4	2	0	0	8
Phelim Comerford	13 August 1995	Scotland	1997	8	2	16	0	40
Des Foy	13 August 1995	Scotland	1996	5	2	0	0	8
Craig McElhatton	13 August 1995	Scotland	1997	5	1	0	0	4
Leo Casey	13 August 1995	Scotland	1997	5	2	0	0	8
Seamus McCallion	13 August 1995	Scotland	1996	3	1	0	0	4
Liam Horrigan	13 August 1995	Scotland	1995	2	1	0	0	4
Bryan Smyth	13 August 1995	Scotland	1995	3	0	0	0	0
Anthony Nuttall	13 August 1995	Scotland	1997	3	0	0	0	0
Paul Owens	13 August 1995	Scotland	1995	3/4?	0	0	0	0
Eric Doyle	13 August 1995	Scotland	1996	5	0	0	0	0
George Slicker	13 August 1995	Scotland	1995	2	0	0	0	0
Dan McCartney	13 August 1995	Scotland	1995	1	0	0	0	0
Peter McNamara	13 August 1995	Scotland	1995	1	0	0	0	0
Gavin Gordon	16 October 1995	Moldova	2001	5	4	0	0	16
Martin Crompton	16 October 1995	Moldova	1999	10	4	0	1	17
Gary Grainey	16 October 1995	Moldova	1995	3	2	0	0	8
Eugene McEntaggert	16 October 1995	Moldova	1995	3	0	0	0	0
Richard Smith	16 October 1995	Moldova	2001	8	4	0	0	16
Conor O'Sullivan	16 October 1995	Morocco	1998	4	1	0	0	4
Michael Browne	20 October 1995	Moldova	1995	2	1	0	0	4
Tom McCabe	16 March 1996	United States	1996	1	1	0	0	4
Lee Hanlan	6 August 1996	Scotland	1997	2	1	0	0	4
Jonathan Garth	6 August 1996	Scotland	1996	1	0	0	0	0
Bernard Dwyer	6 August 1996	Scotland	1999	2	0	0	0	0
David Moffat	6 August 1996	Scotland	1996	1	0	0	0	0
Andrew Burgess	6 August 1996	Scotland	1998	4	0	0	0	0
James Lowes	6 August 1996	Scotland	1997	2	1	0	0	4
Shaun Wyvill	6 August 1996	Scotland	1996	1	0	0	0	0
Sean Cleary	6 August 1996	Scotland	1998	4	0	0	0	0
Phillip Kennedy	6 August 1996	Scotland	1996	1	0	0	0	0
Mark Forster	13 May 1997	France	2001	9	5	0	0	20
Tommy Martyn	13 May 1997	France	2001	8	5	7	1	35
Neil Harmon	13 May 1997	France	2001	6	0	0	0	0
Barrie McDermott	13 May 1997	France	2006	13	2	0	0	8
Cliff Eccles	13 May 1997	France	1998	3	0	0	0	0
Steve Prescott	4 November 1998	France	2001	8	2	17	0	42
Brian Carney	4 November 1998	France	2001	8	3	0	0	12
Shaun Edwards	4 November 1998	France	1998	1	2	0	0	8
Johnny Lawless	4 November 1998	France	2001	8	1	0	0	0
Mick Cassidy	4 November 1998	France	2008	9	1	0	0	4
Ian Pickavance	4 November 1998	France	1998	1	0	0	0	0
Innes Gray	4 November 1998	France	1998	2	0	0	0	0
Gary Connolly	18 November 1998	Scotland	1998	1	0	0	0	0
Terry O'Connor	18 November 1998	Scotland	2005	9	0	0	0	0
Ian Herron	15 October 1999	Wales	2000	3	1	7	0	18
Rob Smyth	15 October 1999	Wales	2003	5	1	0	0	4
Jamie Mathiou	15 October 1999	Wales	2000	3	0	0	0	0
Paul Southern	15 October 1999	Wales	2004	8	0	0	0	0
Liam Bretherton	15 October 1999	Wales	2001	5	0	0	0	0
David Bradbury	15 October 1999	Wales	2001	3	1	0	0	4
Tim Jonkers	31 October 1999	Scotland	2001	2	0	0	0	0
Paul Salmon	31 October 1999	Scotland	1999	1	0	0	0	0
Garrett Molloy	31 October 1999	Scotland	1999	1	0	0	0	0
Michael Withers	28 October 2000	Samoa	2000	4	4	0	0	16
Michael Eagar	28 October 2000	Samoa	2000	3	1	0	0	4
Ryan Sheridan	28 October 2000	Samoa	2000	4	2	0	0	8
Danny Williams	28 October 2000	Samoa	2000	4	0	0	0	0
Chris Joynt	28 October 2000	Samoa	2000	4	1	0	0	4
Kevin Campion	28 October 2000	Samoa	2000	4	0	0	0	0
Luke Ricketson	28 October 2000	Samoa	2000	4	1	0	0	4
David Barnhill	28 October 2000	Samoa	2000	4	1	0	0	4
Gavin Clinch	4 November 2000	New Zealand Maoris	2001	3	0	2	0	4
Liam Tallon	4 November 2000	New Zealand Maoris	2000	1	0	0	0	0
Damian Munro	26 June 2001	France	2001	1	0	0	0	0
Francis Cummins	26 June 2001	France	2005	5	2	0	0	8
Shayne McMenemy	26 June 2001	France	2001	1	0	0	0	0
Scott Dyson	26 June 2001	France	2001	1	0	0	0	0
Martin McLoughlin	26 June 2001	France	2006	6	0	0	0	0
Michael Slicker	26 June 2001	France	2003	3	0	0	0	0
Lee Doran	26 October 2003	Scotland	2008	9	0	0	0	0
Anthony Stewart	26 October 2003	Scotland	2007	9	2	0	0	8
Dean Gaskell	26 October 2003	Scotland	2005	4	1	0	0	4
Paul Handforth	26 October 2003	Scotland	2011	7	2	7	0	22
Neil Roden	26 October 2003	Scotland	2003	2	0	0	0	0
Richard Marshall	26 October 2003	Scotland	2003	2	0	0	0	0
Phil Cantillon	26 October 2003	Scotland	2006	7	9	0	0	36
Phil Farrell	26 October 2003	Scotland	2003	1	0	0	0	0
James King	26 October 2003	Scotland	2003	2	2	0	0	8
Tommy Gallagher	26 October 2003	Scotland	2004	5	0	0	0	0
Karl Fitzpatrick	26 October 2003	Scotland	2009	13	9	5	0	46
Christopher Maye	26 October 2003	Scotland	2004	4	0	0	0	0
David Bates	26 October 2003	Scotland	2006	6	1	0	0	4
Carl De Chenu	1 November 2003	France	2004	4	1	0	0	4
Melvin Alker	9 May 2004	United States	2004	2	2	0	0	8
Danny Ashton	9 May 2004	United States	2004	2	0	0	0	0
Stuart Littler	17 October 2004	Wales	2016	21	13	1	0	54
Ian Dowling	17 October 2004	Wales	2004	3	0	0	0	0
Pat Weisner	17 October 2004	Wales	2004	3	0	8	4	20
Matthew McConnell	17 October 2004	Wales	2004	3	0	0	0	0
Paul Dorley	17 October 2004	Wales	2004	3	0	0	0	0
Declan Foy	17 October 2004	Wales	2004	3	0	0	0	0
Phil Purdue	17 October 2004	Wales	2005	2	0	0	0	0
Simon Manuel	17 October 2004	Wales	2004	1	0	0	0	0
Ged Corcoran	29 October 2004	Scotland	2011	12	1	0	0	4
John Gallagher	7 November 2004	England	2004	1	0	0	0	0
Michael Platt	23 October 2005	Scotland	2014	6	2	0	0	8
Martin Gambles	23 October 2005	Scotland	2005	2	0	0	0	0
Paul McNicholas	23 October 2005	Scotland	2006	3	0	0	0	0
Simon Finnigan	23 October 2005	Scotland	2013	9	1	0	0	4
Gareth Haggerty	23 October 2005	Scotland	2008	6	0	0	0	0
Billy Treacy	23 October 2005	Scotland	2007	3	0	1	0	2
Kevin O'Riordan	23 October 2005	Scotland	2005	2	0	0	0	0
Michael Brodie	29 October 2005	Wales	2005	1	0	0	0	0
Gavin Dodd	22 October 2006	Russia	2007	3	3	0	0	12
Steve Gibbons	22 October 2006	Russia	2009	7	0	0	0	0
Liam Harrison	22 October 2006	Russia	2009	2	1	0	0	4
Chris Bridge	22 October 2006	Russia	2009	4	2	12	0	32
Bob Beswick	22 October 2006	Russia	2019	26	3	0	0	12
Ryan Tandy	22 October 2006	Russia	2008	5	1	0	0	4
David Allen	22 October 2006	Russia	2013	9	1	0	0	4
Wayne Kerr	22 October 2006	Russia	2012	12	0	0	0	0
Alan Robinson	22 October 2006	Russia	2006	2	0	0	0	0
Scott Grix	5 November 2006	Lebanon	2018	22	8	0	0	32
Damian Blanch	5 November 2006	Lebanon	2013	9	9	0	0	36
Steve Nolan	5 November 2006	Lebanon	2006	1	0	0	0	0
Sean Gleeson	20 October 2007	Russia	2008	5	3	0	0	12
Liam Finn	20 October 2007	Russia	2018	30	8	67	0	166
Eamon O'Carroll	20 October 2007	Russia	2013	6	0	0	0	0
David Buckley	20 October 2007	Russia	2007	1	0	0	0	0
Clive Gee	20 October 2007	Russia	2007	1	0	0	0	0
Paul Prescott	2 November 2007	Lebanon	2007	1	0	0	0	0
Pat Richards	27 October 2008	Tonga	2013	7	3	11	0	34
Ben Harrison	27 October 2008	Tonga	2008	3	0	0	0	0
Michael McIlorum	27 October 2008	Tonga	2017	6	1	0	0	4
John Coleman	18 October 2009	Serbia	2009	1	1	0	0	4
Tyrone McCarthy	18 October 2009	Serbia	2017	13	1	0	0	4
Tim Bergin	18 October 2009	Serbia	2012	10	7	0	0	28
Ryan Boyle	18 October 2009	Serbia	2010	5	1	0	0	4
Luke Ambler	18 October 2009	Serbia	2015	18	6	0	0	24
Sean Hesketh	18 October 2009	Serbia	2015	11	2	4	0	16
Jason Golden	18 October 2009	Serbia	2009	1	0	0	0	0
Paddy Barcoe	18 October 2009	Serbia	2011	6	0	0	0	0
Brendan Guilfoyle	18 October 2009	Serbia	2010	2	1	0	0	4
James Coyle	18 October 2009	Serbia	2009	3	0	0	0	0
Marcus St Hilaire	1 November 2009	Wales	2009	2	1	0	0	4
James Haley	1 November 2009	Wales	2011	6	2	0	0	8
Michael Haley	1 November 2009	Wales	2012	4	0	0	0	0
Brett McDermott	8 November 2009	Lebanon	2010	4	0	0	0	0
Gregg McNally	9 October 2010	France	2012	8	3	9	0	30
Simon Grix	9 October 2010	France	2010	2	0	0	0	0
Jamie O'Callaghan	9 October 2010	France	2010	3	1	0	0	4
John Gillam	9 October 2010	France	2010	3	4	0	0	16
Matthew Fox	9 October 2010	France	2010	3	0	0	0	0
Joe Taylor	9 October 2010	France	2012	7	3	0	0	12
Matt Ashe	9 October 2010	France	2010	3	0	0	0	0
Ian Cross	16 October 2011	Scotland	2012	4	0	0	0	0
Elliot Cosgrove	16 October 2011	Scotland	2015	10	0	0	0	0
Paddy Boyle	16 October 2011	Scotland	2011	2	0	0	0	0
Kyle Amor	16 October 2011	Scotland	2017	4	1	0	0	4
Lemeki Vunipulu	16 October 2011	Scotland	2011	1	0	0	0	0
Sean Carmody	16 October 2011	Scotland	2011	2	0	0	0	0
Callum Casey	16 October 2011	Scotland	2014	8	1	0	0	4
Aaron McCloskey	16 October 2011	Scotland	2012	4	0	0	0	0
Pat Smith	22 October 2011	Wales	2012	3	0	0	0	0
Tom McGarr	22 October 2011	Wales	2011	1	0	0	0	0
Joe Mulhern	22 October 2011	Wales	2011	1	0	0	0	0
Andy McGrory	22 October 2011	Wales	2011	1	0	0	0	0
John O'Donnell	16 June 2012	England Knights	2012	3	1	0	0	4
Adam Hughes	16 June 2012	England Knights	2012	1	0	0	0	0
James Mendeika	16 June 2012	England Knights	2015	8	0	0	0	0
Anthony Mullally	16 June 2012	England Knights	2017	4	0	0	0	0
Kurt Haggerty	16 June 2012	England Knights	2013	2	0	0	0	0
Sean Casey	16 June 2012	England Knights	2012	1	0	0	0	0
Danny Bridge	16 June 2012	England Knights	2015	5	0	0	0	0
Joshua Toole	14 October 2012	Scotland	2014	6	1	0	0	4
Carl Sice	14 October 2012	Scotland	2012	2	0	0	0	0
Colton Roche	14 October 2012	Scotland	2012	2	0	0	0	0
Sam Wellings	14 October 2012	Scotland	2012	2	0	0	0	0
Matty Hadden	14 October 2012	Scotland	2017	5	0	0	0	0
Tom McKeown	14 October 2012	Scotland	2012	1	0	0	0	0
Api Pewhairangi	28 October 2013	Fiji	2017	2	0	0	0	0
Brett White	28 October 2013	Fiji	2013	3	0	0	0	0
Rory Kostjasyn	28 October 2013	Fiji	2013	3	0	0	0	0
Ben Currie	28 October 2013	Fiji	2013	3	0	0	0	0
James Hasson	28 October 2013	Fiji	2017	3	1	0	0	4
Shannon McDonnell	18 October 2014	France	2017	3	2	0	0	8
Callum Mulkeen	18 October 2014	France	2015	5	1	0	0	4
Haydn Peacock	18 October 2014	France	2015	5	3	0	0	12
Casey Dunne	18 October 2014	France	2015	6	2	1	0	10
Ben Johnston	18 October 2014	France	2015	5	0	0	0	0
Robbie Mulhern	18 October 2014	France	2015	4	0	0	0	0
Will Hope	18 October 2014	France	2017	6	1	0	0	4
Jobe Murphy	18 October 2014	France	2014	3	1	0	0	4
Wayne Kelly	18 October 2014	France	2014	1	0	0	0	0
Graham O'Keeffe	25 October 2014	Scotland	2015	3	0	0	0	0
Brad Hargreaves	2 November 2014	Wales	2015	4	5	0	0	20
Rob Armstrong	12 July 2015	Belgium	2016	5	6	0	0	24
Gerard Arthur	12 July 2015	Belgium	2015	3	0	0	0	0
Gareth Gill	12 July 2015	Belgium	2018	12	2	0	0	8
Oliver Roberts	17 October 2015	France	2015	3	0	0	0	0
Joe Keyes	17 October 2015	France	2015	3	0	0	0	0
Onisi Burekama	16 October 2016	Jamaica	2016	1	1	0	0	4
George King	22 October 2016	Spain	2024	14	7	0	0	28
Toby King	29 October 2016	Russia	2022	4	2	0	0	8
Joe Philbin	29 October 2016	Russia	2017	4	1	0	0	4
Ed Chamberlain	29 October 2017	Italy	2022	6	2	3	0	14
Michael Morgan	29 October 2017	Italy	2017	2	1	0	0	4
Liam Kay	29 October 2017	Italy	2017	3	3	0	0	12
Brad Singleton	29 October 2017	Italy	2017	3	0	0	0	0
Louie McCarthy-Scarsbrook	29 October 2017	Italy	2017	3	1	0	0	4
Andy Coade	30 June 2018	Hungary	2018	1	3	0	0	12
Matt Coade	30 June 2018	Hungary	2019	3	1	9	0	22
Ryan Guilfoyle	30 June 2018	Hungary	2018	1	0	0	0	0
Conor Loughrey	30 June 2018	Hungary	2018	1	1	0	0	4
Darragh McGee	30 June 2018	Hungary	2018	1	0	0	0	0
Richie McHugh	30 June 2018	Hungary	2018	1	0	0	0	0
Phil Morrison	30 June 2018	Hungary	2018	1	0	0	0	0
John Rhatigan	30 June 2018	Hungary	2018	1	0	0	0	0
Collie Ryan	30 June 2018	Hungary	2018	1	0	0	0	0
Roy Stanley	30 June 2018	Hungary	2022	1	0	0	0	0
Lewis Bienek	27 October 2018	Scotland	2018	3	0	0	0	0
Liam Byrne	27 October 2018	Scotland	2022	7	0	0	0	0
Jack Higginson	27 October 2018	Scotland	2018	3	2	0	0	8
Ronan Michael	27 October 2018	Scotland	2024	7	0	0	0	0
Declan O'Donnell	27 October 2018	Scotland	2019	4	1	0	0	4
Ethan Ryan	27 October 2018	Scotland	2019	5	2	0	0	8
Michael Ward	27 October 2018	Scotland	2024	6	0	0	0	0
Ed O'Keefe	3 November 2018	France	2018	1	0	0	0	0
Frankie Halton	26 October 2019	Scotland	2022	5	1	0	0	4
Pat Moran	26 October 2019	Scotland	2024	3	2	0	0	8
Zack McComb	9 November 2019	Italy	2024	2	0	0	0	0
James Mulvany	9 November 2019	Italy	2022	1	0	0	0	0
Josh Cook	16 October 2022	Jamaica	2022	3	0	0	0	0
Jaimin Jolliffe	16 October 2022	Jamaica	2022	2	0	0	0	0
Luke Keary	16 October 2022	Jamaica	2022	3	0	0	0	0
James McDonnell	16 October 2022	Jamaica	2022	1	1	0	0	4
Richard Myler	16 October 2022	Jamaica	2022	3	0	0	0	0
Brendan O'Hagan	16 October 2022	Jamaica	2022	3	1	0	0	4
Harry Rushton	16 October 2022	Jamaica	2024	4	1	0	0	4
Innes Senior	16 October 2022	Jamaica	2022	3	1	0	0	4
Louis Senior	16 October 2022	Jamaica	2022	3	6	0	0	24
Dan Norman	28 October 2022	New Zealand	2022	1	0	0	0	0
Henry O'Kane	28 October 2022	New Zealand	2022	1	0	0	0	0
Tom Ashurst	21 September 2024	Netherlands	2024	1	1	0	0	4
Stephen Cahill	21 September 2024	Netherlands	2024	2	1	0	0	4
Jake Connell	21 September 2024	Netherlands	2024	1	0	0	0	0
Liam Coyne	21 September 2024	Netherlands	2024	1	0	0	0	0
James Farrar	21 September 2024	Netherlands	2024	2	1	5	0	14
Jamie Gill	21 September 2024	Netherlands	2024	1	0	0	0	0
Euan Haynes	21 September 2024	Netherlands	2024	1	0	0	0	0
Ryan Hogg	21 September 2024	Netherlands	2024	2	0	0	0	0
Ellis Keppel	21 September 2024	Netherlands	2024	1	0	0	0	0
Conlan Mawson	21 September 2024	Netherlands	2024	1	0	0	0	0
Jo McConnell	21 September 2024	Netherlands	2024	1	0	0	0	0
Liam O'Callaghan	21 September 2024	Netherlands	2024	2	2	0	0	8
Jake Parks	21 September 2024	Netherlands	2024	1	0	0	0	0
Adam Quinn	21 September 2024	Netherlands	2024	1	1	0	0	4
Patrick Stapleton	21 September 2024	Netherlands	2024	1	0	0	0	0
Oliver Whitford	21 September 2024	Netherlands	2024	1	0	0	0	0
Samuel Winney	21 September 2024	Netherlands	2024	2	0	0	0	0
Keanan Brand	27 October 2024	Scotland	2024	1	0	0	0	0
Riley Dean	27 October 2024	Scotland	2024	1	0	0	0	0
Aaron Lynch	27 October 2024	Scotland	2024	1	0	0	0	0
Aidan McGowan	27 October 2024	Scotland	2024	1	0	0	0	0
Lewis Wing	27 October 2024	Scotland	2024	1	0	0	0	0

== See also ==
- List of Great Britain national rugby league team players
- Ireland national rugby league team match results
- Ireland A national rugby league team
