= 1995 Rugby League Emerging Nations Tournament =

Rugby league tournament

1995 Emerging Nations World Championship
- Number of teams: 7
- Host country: England
- Winner: Cook Islands (1st title)
- Matches played: 10
- Attendance: 24,260 (2,426 per match)
- Top scorer: (Cook Islands) Meti Noovao (50 points)
- Top try scorer: (Cook Islands) James Cuthers (7 tries)

The 1995 Rugby League Emerging Nations World Championship was held alongside the Centenary Rugby League World Cup. Although the competition received little build-up or promotion, the novelty value of the teams taking part encouraged relatively large crowds, and the competition was a success. A crowd of 4,147 was present at Gigg Lane, Bury for the final between the Cook Islands and Ireland.

== Squads ==
To ensure competitive balance, teams were restricted to selecting a maximum of five professional players in their squad for the tournament.

=== Cook Islands ===
- Managers – Paul Vaetoru, Ian Wilmott
- Coaches – Paul McGreal, Nooroa Tupa

Player	Club	Tries	Goals	Field Goals	Points
Turara Bates	Titikaveka Bulldogs	0	0	0	0
Craig Bowen	Illawarra Steelers	3	0	0	12
James Cuthers	Otahuhu Leopards	7	0	0	28
Ali Davys	Brisbane Broncos	0	0	1	1
Tama Henry	Tupapa-Maraerenga Panthers	0	0	0	0
Bob Hunter	Ngatangiia-Matavera Sea Eagles	2	0	0	8
Martin Iro	Titikaveka Bulldogs	0	0	0	0
Lefour Jack	Tupapa-Maraerenga Panthers	0	0	0	0
Denvour Johnston	Wellington Rugby League	2	0	0	8
Alec Kermode	Ngatangiia-Matavera Sea Eagles	1	0	0	4
Lloyd Matapo	Titikaveka Bulldogs	0	0	0	0
Piri Matapo	Titikaveka Bulldogs	0	0	0	0
Meti Noovao	Auckland City Vulcans	3	19	0	50
Andrew Paitai	Tupapa-Maraerenga Panthers	0	0	0	0
Richard Piakura	Ngatangiia-Matavera Sea Eagles	0	1	0	2
Sonny Shepherd	Ngatangiia-Matavera Sea Eagles	4	0	0	16
Taoro Strickland	Tupapa-Maraerenga Panthers	0	0	0	0
Tangimetua Tangimetua	Ngatantiia-Matavera Sea Eagles	0	0	0	0
Ngere Tariu	Tupapa-Maraerenga Panthers	6	0	0	24
Jason Temu	Oldham	0	0	0	0
Tungane Tini	Tupap-Maraerenga Panthers	0	0	0	0
Tiri Toa	Ngatangiia-Matavera Sea Eagles	2	0	0	8
Allan Tuara	Tupap-Maraerenga Panthers	2	0	0	8

=== Ireland ===
- Manager Mark Casham
- Coaches Niel Wood, Terry Flanagan

Player	Club	Tries	Goals	Field Goals	Points
Michael Browne	Tallaght Tigers	1	0	0	4
Leo Casey	Featherstone Rovers	1	0	0	4
Sean Cleary	Dublin Blues Rugby League	0	0	0	0
Phelim Comerford	Dublin Blues Rugby League	2	12	0	32
Martin Crompton	Oldham	1	0	0	4
Eric Doyle	Dublin Blues Rugby League	0	0	0	0
Des Foy	Oldham	2	0	0	8
Gavin Gordon	Bangor Vikings	4	0	0	16
Gary Grainey	Leigh Miners Welfare	2	0	0	8
Liam Horrigan	Woolston Rovers	1	0	0	4
Seamus McCallion	Bramley RLFC	0	0	0	0
Craig McElhatton	Bradford Dudley Hill	1	0	0	4
Eugene McEntaggert	Dublin Blues Rugby League	0	0	0	0
Anthony Nuttall	Newsome Magpies	0	0	0	0
Conor O'Sullivan	Dublin Blues Rugby League	1	0	0	4
Paul Owens	Bradford Dudley Hill	0	0	0	0
George Slicker	Halifax	0	0	0	0
Richard Smith	Bradford Northern	1	0	0	4
Rickey Smith	Bangor Vikings	1	0	0	4
Bryan Smyth	Illingworth ARLFC	0	0	0	0
Paul Topping	Oldham	0	0	0	0

== Venues ==
The games were played at various venues in England. The Final was played at Gigg Lane in Bury.

Bury	Castleford	Warrington	Rochdale
Gigg Lane	Wheldon Road	Wilderspool Stadium	Spotland Stadium
Capacity: 11,840	Capacity: 11,775	Capacity: 10,200	Capacity: 9,961
Leigh	Featherstone	Northampton	Dewsbury
Hilton Park	Post Office Road	Sixfields Stadium	Crown Flatt
Capacity: 10,000	Capacity: 9,850	Capacity: 7,798	Capacity: 5,100

== Group stage ==
=== Group A ===
Team	Played	Won	Drew	Lost	For	Against	Diff	Points
Cook Islands	3	3	0	0	143	38	+105	6
Scotland	3	2	0	1	82	46	+36	4
Russia	3	1	0	2	57	118	−61	2
United States	3	0	0	3	50	130	−80	0

- Cook Islands advanced to the final.

16 October 1995

Cook Islands	64–8	United States

Post Office Road, Featherstone

16 October 1995

Scotland	34–9	Russia

Post Office Road, Featherstone

18 October 1995

Cook Islands	58–20	Russia

Hilton Park, Leigh

18 October 1995

Scotland	38–16	United States

Sixfields, Northampton

20 October 1995

Cook Islands	21–10	Scotland

Wheldon Road, Castleford

20 October 1995

Russia	28–26	United States

Wilderspool, Warrington

=== Group B ===
Team	Played	Won	Drew	Lost	For	Against	Diff	Points
Ireland	2	2	0	0	90	32	+58	4
Moldova	2	1	0	1	50	67	-17	2
Morocco	2	0	0	2	25	66	−41	0

- Ireland advanced to the final.

16 October 1995

Ireland	48–26	Moldova

Spotlands, Rochdale

18 October 1995

Moldova	24–19	Morocco

Sixfields, Northampton

20 October 1995

Ireland	42–6	Morocco

Crown Flatt, Dewsbury

== Final ==
24 October 1995

Cook Islands	22–6	Ireland
Tries: Kermode, Shepherd, Bowen, Cuthers; Goals: Noovao (3)		Tries: Comerford; Goals: Comerford

Gigg Lane, Bury
Attendance: 4,147
Referee: Dennis Hale (England)
Player of the Match: Ali Davys (Cook Islands)

== See also ==
- 2000 Rugby League Emerging Nations Tournament
