= Rugby league in Ireland =

- Country: Ireland
- Governing body: Rugby League Ireland
- National team: Ireland
- Nickname: Wolfhounds
- First played: 1934 (Note: This year represents an exhibition match by British teams. 1989 was the first time the sport was played by an Irish club.)

National competitions
- RLI Premiership

Rugby league is a team sport played in Ireland on an all-Ireland basis.

== History ==
=== First appearances in Ireland ===
In May 1934 Wigan beat Warrington 32–19 in an exhibition match in Dublin. Twenty years later, in May 1954, Warrington were again defeated by Halifax in both Belfast (34–15) and Dublin (23–11).

=== First clubs and modern beginnings ===
Modern-day Rugby league in Ireland really began in 1989 when Brian Corrigan founded the Dublin Blues Rugby League, consisting mostly of rugby union players who wanted to stay fit over the summer. The Blues competed against touring teams from Britain, scoring a number of victories over British amateur opposition.

In early 1995, the British Rugby Football League development arm financed the position of a Development Officer for Ireland, providing a boost to the development of the game.

A student's framework was also established with teams representing Ireland at the Student's Rugby League World Cup in the UK in 1989, in Australia in 1992 and the UK in 1996 comprising Ireland based and UK based players. In 1996 the tournament was based in Warrington, England and several members of the Irish national champion Dublin Blues represented the Ireland Student Team against USA, Western Samoa, New Zealand, Japan and Wales. These included Phelim Comerford, Gavin Lee,Gavin Gordon Robert McDonnell, Paul Ryan, Damien Murphy, Dara MacCarthy (Top Try Scorer 1996/97) and Sean Cleary.

In 1995 Ireland formed its first competitive team to play against the USA in Washington DC on St. Patrick's Day. Ireland won 24–22.

In 1996, the inaugural Ireland "State of Origin" series was established between Northern Ireland and the Republic where representatives of the club teams engaged in the All-Ireland competition played for each region over a 3 match competition. The inaugural winner was the Southern team. Some of the players involved in the State of Origin series from both regions over the next few years included some of the original players with Rugby League in Ireland: Eric Doyle, Phelim Comerford, Rickey Smith, Innes Gray, Brian Carney, Sean Cleary, Gavin Gordon, Conor O'Sullivan, Garret Molloy, Mick Molloy, Alan Cuffe, Rody Corrigan, Phelim Dolan, Dan McCartney, Mark Cashen and Mick Browne.

Competitive matches were established between teams in Leinster and Ulster: Schoolboy matches were played between Dublin and Belfast schools, Open Age Clubs competed against each other in the All-Ireland Challenge Cup. Teams included Belfast Wildcats and Bangor Vikings from Ulster. From Leinster there were Dublin-based Dublin Blues, North Side Saints, Tallaght Tigers, Churchtown Warriors, Seapoint Sharks and Bray-based East Coast Panthers. From Munster the Cork Bulls were formed. Northside Saints and Cork Bulls had a number of successes, but the long-established Dublin Blues were always pre-eminent and there or thereabouts when it came to the trophy presentations.

The modern-day Rugby League Ireland was formed in 2001 initially in Leinster and Munster conferences, prior to this the competition was known as Ireland Rugby League, though after a season the league reverted to a national competition for two seasons before the conferences were reintroduced for 2004.

In 2006 the Leinster and Munster conferences were abandoned in favour of an all-Ireland league, but conference play was reintroduced for the 2007 season, this time on a north–south basis, below the Elite division.

In 2008 two national divisions operated, the Carnegie League and the Emerald Rugby National Conference.

In 2009 the Emerald National Conference was replaced by the Emerald League, run on a merit league basis.

In 2010 the Provincial Conferences were re-instated with the Leinster, Munster and Ulster Conferences. A total of 17 teams competed during the season. The Conference Champions were Ballynahinch Rabbitohs in Ulster, Dublin City Exiles in Leinster, and Treaty City Titans in Munster.

In 2011 an academy was set up in Limerick where talented players would be identified to sign with Super League clubs, 4 were eventually signed across St Helens R.F.C., Castleford Tigers and Leeds Rhinos. This was also intended to sow the seeds for a potential entry into Super League within five years; however, this never materialized.

== Governing body ==
In Ireland the governing body is Rugby League Ireland (RLI).

== Competitions ==
=== RLI Premiership ===
The RLI Premiership is the top division of men's rugby league in Ireland. Currently, there are 5 teams competing.

Club	Location
Longhorns	(Republic of Ireland) Dublin
Cork Bulls	(Republic of Ireland) Cork
Galway Tribesmen	(Republic of Ireland) Galway
Dublin City Exiles	(Republic of Ireland) Dublin
Banbridge Broncos	(Northern Ireland) Banbridge

=== RLI Women's Premiership ===
The RLI Women's Premiership is the top division of women's rugby league in Ireland. The competition began in 2021. It currently has 3 teams competing.

Club	Location
Galway Tribeswomen	(Republic of Ireland) Galway
Dublin City Exiles	(Republic of Ireland) Dublin
Banbridge Broncos	(Northern Ireland) Banbridge

== The national team ==
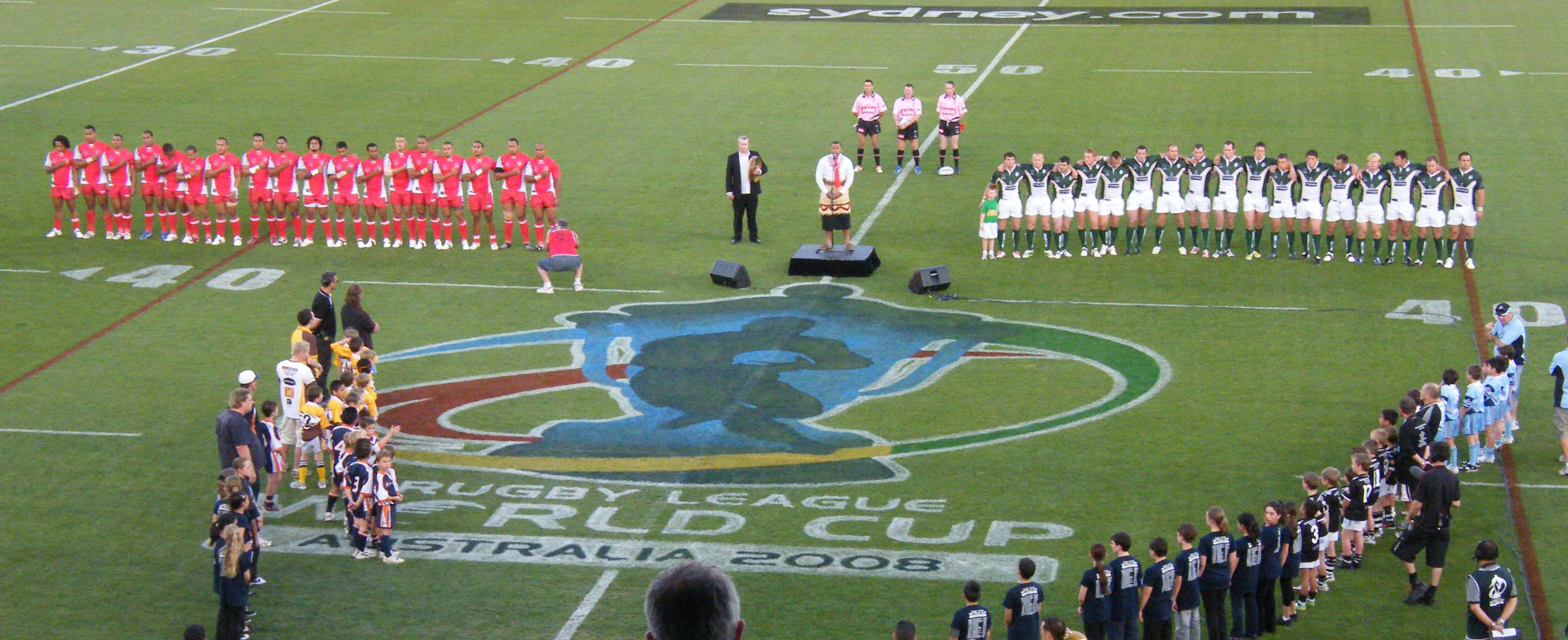
Ireland vs Tonga at the 2008 Rugby League World Cup

There are two Ireland national rugby league teams – Ireland and Ireland A. Ireland is the primary team which is made up of Irish players who compete in leagues across the globe whereas Ireland A is made up of players who play in the amateur Irish Elite League only. Irish players are also eligible for the Great Britain national team.

Ireland also has a strong students team who competed in the 2008 Students world cup and finished 2nd in the student's 4 nations tournament in 2009. Ireland finished 2nd again in the student's 4 nations tournament in 2023 beating Wales and Scotland in a strong showing for the team.

== Media ==
There are two weekly rugby league newspapers in the UK Rugby Leaguer & League Express and League Weekly and two monthly magazines, Rugby League World and Thirteen Magazine. Most of their content covers the sport in Britain, Australia and New Zealand but Irish rugby league is also covered. These publications are usually only available by subscription in Ireland.

International rugby league magazine covers all rugby league internationally and has featured Ireland's domestic season, road to the world cup and interviewed Luke Ambler.

A rugby union publication called Emerald Rugby covers rugby league in Ireland each month.

BBC Sport own the rights to broadcast a highlights package called the Super League Show which was first broadcast in Northern Ireland in 2008. Prior to this it had only been broadcast in the North of England. Rugby League Raw is not broadcast in Northern Ireland despite the BBC owning the rights to do so. The BBC covers the Rugby League Challenge Cup from the rounds in which the top clubs enter.

BBC Radio 5 Live and BBC Radio 5 Sports Extra carry commentary from a selection of Super League matches each week.

Live Super League and National Rugby League games are shown on Sky Sports Arena with highlights also being shown on the channel. From the 2022 season, 10 live Super League games per season will be shown on Channel 4, the first time the league will be shown on terrestrial television. Championship games are shown on Premier Sports, with one game a week being aird.

Setanta Sports Ireland broadcast highlights of the 2005 and 2006 pre-season Dublin challenge matches, and the 2005 European Nations Cup, on its Sports Weekly and Sports Monthly programmes.

Manchester based Channel M show some National League and amateur rugby on their Code XIII programme.

== Challenge Cup heritage ==
Since its formation in 1997, winners of the RLI Premiership have been eligible to play in the Rugby Football League's Challenge Cup. Results of Irish teams are:

Year	Club	Round	Result
1998	Dublin Blues	R1	Lost to Dewsbury Moor 32-7
1999	Northside Saints	R1	Lost to Siddal 90-10
2000	Dublin Blues	R1	Lost to Farnworth 54-2
2001	Bangor Vikings	R1	Lost to New Earswick 36-20
2002	Cork Bulls	R1	Lost to Dewsbury Celtic 18-35
2003	Dublin Exiles	R1	Lost to Birkenshaw 56-0
2018	Longhorns	R1	lost to West Hull 58-10
2019	Longhorns	R1	Lost to Lock Lane 16-10
2020	Longhorns	R1	Lost to Normanton Knights 30-24
2022	Galway Tribesman	R1	Lost to Pilkington Recs 36-10
2023	Dublin City Exiles	R1	Beat Hammersmith Hills Hoists 42-8
2023	Dublin City Exiles	R2	Lost to Orrell St James 68-14
2025	Longhorns	R1	Lost to Ince Rose Bridge 56-12

== Wheelchair rugby league ==
The Ireland national wheelchair rugby league team has existing since 2012 under the governance of Rugby League Ireland. The first games in Ireland came in 2024 when Galway hosted the 2024 Celtic Cup, with Ireland setting up their first domestic competition, an inter provincial league, a few months later. The 2024 inter provincial league saw Leinster beat Munster 58–30 in November.

== See also ==
- Rugby League Ireland
- Ireland national rugby league team
- Great Britain national rugby league team
- Rugby league in the British Isles
