= List of Ireland national rugby league team results =

The following list is a complete collection of results for the Ireland national rugby league team.

== 1990s ==
No.	Date	Home	Score	Away	Competition	Location	Attendance	Ref.
1	17 March 1995	United States	22–24	Ireland	St. Patrick's Day Test	(United States) RFK Stadium, Washington DC		
2	13 August 1995	Ireland	26–22	Scotland	Friendly	(Republic of Ireland) RDS Arena, Dublin	5,716	
3	16 October 1995	Ireland	48–26	Moldova	1995 Emerging Nations Tournament	(England) Spotland Stadium, Rochdale	1,235	
4	20 October 1995	Ireland	42–6	Morocco	1995 Emerging Nations Tournament	(England) Crown Flatt, Dewsbury	1,756	
5	24 October 1995	Cook Islands	22–6	Ireland	1995 Emerging Nations Tournament	(England) Gigg Lane, Bury	4,147	
6	16 March 1996	United States	12–14	Ireland	Saint Patrick's Day Test	(United States) RFK Stadium, Washington D.C.	2,500	
7	6 August 1996	Scotland	26–6	Ireland	Friendly	(Scotland) Firhill Stadium, Glasgow	1,147	
8	13 May 1997	France	30–30	Ireland	Friendly	(France) Stade Robert Bobin, Essonne	4,250	
9	4 November 1998	Ireland	22–24	France	Clash of the Nations	(Republic of Ireland) Tolka Park, Dublin	1,511	
10	18 November 1998	Scotland	10–17	Ireland	Clash of the Nations	(Scotland) Firhill Park, Glasgow	1,028	
11	15 October 1999	Wales	17–24	Ireland	1999 Triangular Series	(Wales) Vetch Field, Swansea	812	
12	31 October 1999	Ireland	31–10	Scotland	1999 Triangular Series	(Republic of Ireland) Tolka Park, Dublin	385	

== 2000s ==
No.	Date	Home	Score	Away	Competition	Location	Attendance	Ref.
13	28 October 2000	Ireland	30–16	Samoa	2000 World Cup	(Northern Ireland) Windsor Park, Belfast	3,207	
14	1 November 2000	Ireland	18–6	Scotland	2000 World Cup	(Republic of Ireland) Tolka Park, Dublin	1,782	
15	4 November 2000	Ireland	30–16	Māori	2000 World Cup	(Republic of Ireland) Tolka Park, Dublin	3,164	
16	11 November 2000	England	26–16	Ireland	2000 World Cup	(England) Headingley Stadium, Leeds	15,405	
17	26 June 2001	France	56–16	Ireland	Friendly	(France) Stade Municipal d'Albi, Albi	2,006	
18	26 October 2003	Scotland	22–24	Ireland	2003 European Nations Cup	(Scotland) Old Anniesland, Glasgow	1,123	
19	1 November 2003	Ireland	18–26	France	2003 European Nations Cup	(Republic of Ireland) Dalymount Park, Dublin	1,082	
20	9 May 2004	Ireland	74–16	United States	Victory Cup	(Russia) Moscow		
21	16 May 2004	Russia	64–6	Ireland	Victory Cup	(Russia) Moscow		
22	17 October 2004	Wales	12–25	Ireland	2004 European Nations Cup	(Wales) Talbot Athletic Ground, Port Talbot	1,296	
23	29 October 2004	Ireland	43–10	Scotland	2004 European Nations Cup	(Republic of Ireland) Navan R.F.C., County Meath	600	
24	7 November 2004	England	36–12	Ireland	2004 European Nations Cup	(England) Halliwell Jones Stadium, Warrington	3,582	
25	23 October 2005	Scotland	6–12	Ireland	2005 European Nations Cup	(Scotland) Old Anniesland, Glasgow	1,276	
26	29 October 2005	Ireland	10–31	Wales	2005 European Nations Cup	(Republic of Ireland) Terenure College RFC, Dublin	500	
27	22 October 2006	Russia	12–50	Ireland	2008 World Cup qualifying	(Russia) Fili Stadium, Moscow	120	
28	5 November 2006	Ireland	18–18	Lebanon	2008 World Cup qualifying	(Republic of Ireland) Tolka Park, Dublin	803	
29	20 October 2007	Ireland	58–18	Russia	2008 World Cup qualifying	(Republic of Ireland) Oak Park, Carlow	986	
30	2 November 2007	Lebanon	16–16	Ireland	2008 World Cup qualifying	(England) Crown Flatt, Dewsbury	450	
31	27 October 2008	Ireland	20–22	Tonga	2008 World Cup	(Australia) Parramatta Stadium, Sydney	6,165	
32	5 November 2008	Ireland	34–16	Samoa	2008 World Cup	(Australia) Parramatta Stadium, Sydney	8,602	
33	10 November 2008	Fiji	30–14	Ireland	2008 World Cup	(Australia) Robina Stadium, Gold Coast	8,224	
34	18 October 2009	Ireland	82–0	Serbia	2009 European Cup	(Republic of Ireland) Spollanstown, Tullamore	295	
35	1 November 2009	Wales	42–12	Ireland	2009 European Cup	(Wales) Sardis Road, Pontypridd	2,143	
36	8 November 2009	Ireland	16–40	Lebanon	2009 European Cup	(Wales) Brewery Field, Bridgend	200	

== 2010s ==
No.	Date	Home	Score	Away	Competition	Location	Attendance	Ref.
37	9 October 2010	France	58–24	Ireland	2010 European Cup	(France) Parc des Sports, Avignon	14,522	
38	17 October 2010	Wales	31–30	Ireland	2010 European Cup	(Wales) The Gnoll, Neath	2,165	
39	24 October 2010	Ireland	22–42	Scotland	2010 European Cup	(Republic of Ireland) Tallaght Stadium, Dublin	684	
40	16 October 2011	Scotland	26–6	Ireland	2011 Autumn International Series	(Scotland) Scotstoun Stadium, Glasgow	802	
41	22 October 2011	Wales	30–6	Ireland	2011 Autumn International Series	(Wales) The Gnoll, Neath	2,265	
42	5 November 2011	Ireland	16–34	France	2011 Autumn International Series	(Republic of Ireland) Thomond Park, Limerick	3,100	
43	16 June 2012	England Knights	62–4	Ireland	Friendly	(England) Langtree Park, St. Helens	11,083	
44	14 October 2012	Scotland	18–30	Ireland	2012 European Cup	(Scotland) Meggetland Stadium, Edinburgh	726	
45	19 October 2012	Ireland	4–56	England Knights	2012 European Cup	(Northern Ireland) Deramore Park, Belfast	774	
46	28 October 2013	Fiji	32–14	Ireland	2013 World Cup	(England) Spotland Stadium, Rochdale	8,872	
47	2 November 2013	England	42–0	Ireland	2013 World Cup	(England) Kirklees Stadium, Huddersfield	24,375	
48	9 November 2013	Ireland	0–50	Australia	2013 World Cup	(Republic of Ireland) Thomond Park, Limerick	5,021	
49	18 October 2014	Ireland	22–12	France	2014 European Cup	(Republic of Ireland) Tallaght Stadium, Dublin	1,428	
50	25 October 2014	Ireland	4–25	Scotland	2014 European Cup	(Republic of Ireland) Tallaght Stadium, Dublin	c1,400	
51	2 November 2014	Wales	14–46	Ireland	2014 European Cup	(Wales) Racecourse Ground, Wrexham	1,293	
52	12 July 2015	Ireland	34–0	Belgium	Friendly	(Republic of Ireland) Carlisle Grounds, Bray	c.900	
53	29 August 2015	Serbia	16–24	Ireland	Friendly	(Serbia) Makis Stadium, Belgrade		
54	5 September 2015	Malta	22–34	Ireland	Friendly	(Malta) St Julian's		
55	17 October 2015	France	31–14	Ireland	2015 European Cup	(France) Stadium Municipal d'Albi, Albi	4,681	
56	23 October 2015	Scotland	22–24	Ireland	2015 European Cup	(Scotland) Netherdale, Galashiels	1,197	
57	7 November 2015	Ireland	4–30	Wales	2015 European Cup	(Republic of Ireland) Carlisle Grounds, Bray	1,405	
58	3 September 2016	Italy	26–60	Ireland	Friendly	(Italy) Comunale Palazzolo, Brescia	1,500	
59	8 October 2016	Ireland	58–10	Malta	Friendly	(Republic of Ireland) Carlisle Grounds, Bray		
60	16 October 2016	Ireland	16–68	Jamaica	Friendly	(Republic of Ireland) Carlisle Grounds, Bray		
61	22 October 2016	Spain	6–46	Ireland	2017 World Cup Qualifying	(Spain) Polideportivo Quatre Carreres, Valencia	323	
62	30 October 2016	Ireland	70–16	Russia	2017 World Cup Qualifying	(Republic of Ireland) Carlisle Grounds, Bray	867	
63	29 October 2017	Ireland	36–12	Italy	2017 Rugby League World Cup	(Australia) Barlow Park, Cairns	9,216	
64	6 November 2017	Papua New Guinea	14–6	Ireland	2017 Rugby League World Cup	(Papua New Guinea) PNG Football Stadium, Port Moresby	14,800	
65	12 November 2017	Wales	6–34	Ireland	2017 Rugby League World Cup	(Australia) NIB Stadium, Perth	14,744	
66	30 June 2018	Hungary	0–70	Ireland	Friendly	(Hungary) National University of Public Service, Budapest		
67	27 October 2018	Ireland	36–10	Scotland	2018 European Championship	(Republic of Ireland) Morton Stadium, Santry	200	
68	3 November 2018	Ireland	10–24	France	2018 European Championship	(Republic of Ireland) Morton Stadium, Santry	250	
69	11 November 2018	Wales	40–8	Ireland	2018 European Championship	(Wales) Racecourse Ground, Wrexham	1,257	
70	26 October 2019	Spain	8–42	Ireland	2021 World Cup qualifying European playoff	(Spain) Ciutat de l'Esport, Xàtiva	1,013	
71	9 November 2019	Ireland	25–4	Italy	2021 World Cup qualifying European playoff	(Republic of Ireland) Morton Stadium, Santry	c300	

== 2020s ==
No.	Date	Home	Score	Away	Competition	Location	Attendance	Ref.
72	16 October 2022	Jamaica	2–48	Ireland	2021 Rugby League World Cup	(England) Headingley Stadium, Leeds	6,000	
73	23 October 2022	Lebanon	32–14	Ireland	2021 Rugby League World Cup	(England) Leigh Sports Village, Leigh	6,057	
74	28 October 2022	New Zealand	48–10	Ireland	2021 Rugby League World Cup	(England) Headingley Stadium, Leeds	14,044	
75	21 September 2024	Netherlands	28–30	Ireland	Friendly	(Netherlands) Zaandijk Rugby Club, Zaandam		
76	27 October 2024	Scotland	6–36	Ireland	Friendly	(England) Gateshead International Stadium, Gateshead	463	
77	4 October 2025	Netherlands	0–30	Ireland	Friendly	(Netherlands) RC The Bassets, Sassenheim		
78	25 October 2025	Wales	24–0	Ireland	Two-match series friendly	(Wales) The Gnoll, Neath Port Talbot		
79	1 November 2025	Wales	12–36	Ireland	Two-match series friendly	(England) Post Office Road, Featherstone		
80	17 October 2026	Scotland	12–44	Ireland	Celtic Cup	(Scotland) Hawick RFC, Hawick		
81	31 October 2026	Wales	24–6	Ireland	Celtic Cup	(Wales) The Wern, Merthyr Tydfil		

== See also ==
- Rugby league in Ireland
- List of Ireland national rugby league team players
- Ireland national rugby league team
- Ireland A national rugby league team
- Ireland women's national rugby league team
