= Ballyfermot Bears =

Irish rugby league club based in Dublin

Ballyfermot Bears RLFC

Club information
- Full name: Ballyfermot Bears RLFC
- Colours: Red; White; Black; Black
- Founded: 2010; 16 years ago

Current details
- Ground: Markievicz Park (N/A)
- Competition: RLI Leinster League

Ballyfermot Bears RLFC are a rugby league club playing in Ballyfermot in Dublin. They play in IRL Leinster Division. They play in Markievicz Park, in Ballyfermot, a suburb located outside Dublin city.

Their local rivals are Tallaght RLFC, who also play in the same division.

== History ==
Ballyfermot Bears were formed in 2010 after the dissolution the Dublin Destroyers RLFC. In the last three seasons the Bears have competed in the Leinster League playing in Markievicz Park Ballyfermot.
