= Laois Panthers =

Rugby league team from Laois, Ireland

Laois Panthers was a rugby league team from Laois, Ireland. The side played in the Irish Elite League, Ireland's top-tier rugby league competition.

The club was established in 2005 and originally known as Portlaoise Panthers. In October 2009, Tim Bergin became the first Laois Panthers player to be selected for the Ireland national rugby league team.

The Panthers played their home games at Togher Park, Portlaoise until 2010 when they were no longer able to use the ground. In 2011, their home ground was recorded as Lea Road, Portarlington, which later became the home of Portarlington Wolverines, who were established in 2012.

== See also ==
- Rugby League Ireland
