= David Buckley (disambiguation) =

David Buckley (born 1976) is a British composer of film and television scores.

David Buckley may also refer to:

- David Joss Buckley (born 1948), British screenwriter, author, and actor
- David Buckley (Gaelic footballer) (born 2001), Irish Gaelic footballer
- David Buckley (rugby league) (fl. 2000s), rugby league footballer
- David Buckley (born 1965), a British music critic
- David Buckley, former CIA Inspector General appointed to the United States House Select Committee on the January 6 Attack
