= McElhatton =

McElhatton is a surname. Notable people with the surname include:

- Craig McElhatton, Irish rugby league player
- Dave McElhatton (1928–2010), American television anchor
- Heather McElhatton, American radio personality and writer
- Michael McElhatton (born 1963), Irish actor and writer
- Michael McElhatton (footballer) (born 1975), Irish footballer
