= Andrei Olari =

Former Russia & Moldova international rugby league footballer

Personal information
- Born: Tiraspol, Moldova

Playing information
- Position: Five-eighth, Lock
Club
Years	Team	Pld	T	G	FG	P
19??–93	Tiraspol
1993–99	Villefranche XIII Aveyron
1999	Toulouse Olympique	35	3	0	0	12
	Total	35	3	0	0	12
Representative
Years	Team	Pld	T	G	FG	P
1992	CIS	2	0	0	0	0
1995–96	Moldova	1	0	0	0	0
2000	Russia	3	0	0	0	0
- Source: As of 18 February 2021

Andrei Olari (Андрей Оларь) (born in Tiraspol) is a professional rugby player and rugby league footballer. He previously played for the Moldovan team Tiraspol and for the French clubs Villefranche and Toulouse Olympique. He has represented both Moldova and Russia.

== Playing career ==
In 1990, Olari won the first USSR Rugby League Cup as a member of the Tiraspol club, defeating the Moscow Magicians 24-10 in the final. He scored 56 points in two matches against Spartak Moscow and Moscow Magicians scoring 7 tries, 13 conversions and 2 drop goals, which earned him the title of the best scorer in the USSR Cup.

Later, Olari played for French clubs, including Toulouse Olympique team. In the 1999 season, he scored 12 points in 35 Super League matches.

=== International ===
In 1992, Olari captained the CIS national team during their 1992 Tour of South Africa, where the team won both matches.

In 1995, he played in the Emerging Nations tournament for Moldova.

In 2000, Olari was invited by the Russian national team to play at the World Cup that year in England Olari played in all three of Russia's matches at the tournament. and played three matches in the tournament.

== Personal ==
Olari's son, also named Andrei Olari, played with Toulouse Olympique and competed for them in the 2011 RFL Championship. He was called up by the Moldova national rugby union team in 2014 and became a player of the Odessa team Politekhnik.
