= Pacific Challenge =

1996 Pacific Challenge
- Number of teams: 7
- Matches played: 8

The 1996 Pacific Challenge was a rugby league tournament held between Pacific teams. The tournament was played over eight days and in six countries. It featured an uneven draw with every team playing twice, except for Tonga and the New Zealand Residents side who both played three times, and no final.

== Background ==
The tournament was a hastily arranged replacement for the cancelled 1996 Pacific Cup which eventually took place as the 1997 Oceania Cup. The tournament was held during the Superleague war that was severely affecting international rugby league at this time.

== Squads ==
- The Cook Islands included Sonny Shepherd and Richard Piakura.
- Coached by Cameron Bell, the New Zealand Māori squad included Sonny Whakarau, Frank Watene, Paul Rauhihi and Matthew Sturm.
- The New Zealand Residents were coached by Gerard Stokes, captained by Whetu Taewa and included Willie McLean, Earl Va'a, Brian Jellick, Denvour Johnston, Jerry Seuseu, Stuart Lester, Boycie Nelson, Doc Murray, David Bailey and Ben Lythe.
- Tonga included Paul Koloi and Esau Mann.
- Western Samoa included Paki Tuimavave and Mike Setefano.

== Results ==
3 July 1996

Fiji	14 – 8	Cook Islands
Tries: Nakubuwai, Kakuitoga, Vamarasi; Goals: Vamarasi		Tries: Piakura, Shepherd

Ericsson Stadium, Auckland, New Zealand

3 July 1996

Māori	28 – 18	Tonga
Tries: Henry, Kaulima, Rauhihi, Howell; Goals: Howell (6)		Tries: Fonua (2), Filiai, Koloi; Goals: Lafuhoi

Ericsson Stadium, Auckland, New Zealand

3 July 1996

New Zealand Residents	21 – 6	Papua New Guinea
Tries: Stewart, Avery, Bailey; Goals: Lythe (4); Drop goals: Bailey		Tries: Galipo; Goals: Paiyo

Ericsson Stadium, Auckland, New Zealand

6 July 1996

Fiji	34 – 16	New Zealand Residents

Prince Charles Park, Nadi, Fiji

6 July 1996

Western Samoa	16 – 39	Māori

International Stadium, Apia, Western Samoa

8 July 1996

Papua New Guinea	56 - 19	Tonga

Hubert Murray Stadium, Port Moresby, PNG

10 July 1996

Cook Islands	4 – 16	New Zealand Residents

Tereora National Stadium, Rarotonga, Cook Islands

10 July 1996

Tonga	22 – 17	Western Samoa

Tefuaiwa Stadium, Nukuʻalofa, Tonga
