= Rugby in Ireland =

Rugby in Ireland may refer to:

- Rugby union in Ireland
- Rugby league in Ireland
