= Phil Purdue =

Ireland international rugby league footballer

Personal information
- Full name: Philip Purdue
- Born: unknown Raheny, Dublin, Ireland

Playing information

Rugby union
- Position: Number Eight
Club
Years	Team	Pld	T	G	FG	P
1997–03	Dublin University
2003–15	Clontarf FC
	Total	0	0	0	0	0

Rugby league
- Position: Prop
Club
Years	Team	Pld	T	G	FG	P
2004	Clontarf Bulls
2005–08	East Coast Eagles
	Total	0	0	0	0	0
Representative
Years	Team	Pld	T	G	FG	P
2004–06	Ireland	1+1

Philip Purdue (birth unknown) is an Irish amateur rugby union and rugby league footballer who played in the 1990s, 2000s and 2010s. He played club level rugby union (RU) for Dublin University Football Club and Clontarf FC, as a number eight, and representative level rugby league (RL) for Ireland, and at club level for the Clontarf Bulls and the East Coast Eagles as a prop.

== Background ==
Philip Purdue was born in Raheny, Dublin, Ireland, he received a Bachelor of Arts in Computer and Electronic Engineering at Trinity College, Dublin, works as a Software Consultant.

== Playing career ==
=== International honours ===
Philip Purdue won 2-caps for Ireland against Wales in 2004 (won 25–12; 17/10/2004) and Scotland in 2005 (won 12–6; 23/10/2005) while at the Clontarf Bulls (sub), and at the East Coast Eagles.

=== Club career ===
Philip Purdue played in the All Ireland League for Dublin University FC and Clontarf FC and played in the 2006 All-Ireland Final with Clontarf. He won the Leinster Senior Cup in 2006 with Clontarf. He played for the Ireland ‘A’ amateur rugby league side 11 times between 2004 and 2008, captaining the side on a number of occasions. He suffered a broken leg whilst playing rugby league in June 2008.

Morgan Treacy of Inpho Photography won the inaugural IRB Rugby Photograph of the Year award for his shot of Clontarf's Philip Purdue during an AIB League match in March 2006. The winning photo, entitled "Mud, Glorious Mud", was taken during the Division One clash between Clontarf and Belfast Harlequins - on a particularly weather-beaten day at Castle Avenue - and depicts back rower Purdue caked in mud and drawing breath following the loss of a lineout.
