= Jonathan Garth (rugby league) =

Ireland international rugby league footballer

Playing information
- Position: Five-eighth, Stand-off
Club
Years	Team	Pld	T	G	FG	P
≤1996–≥96	Dublin Blues
Representative
Years	Team	Pld	T	G	FG	P
1996	Ireland	1
- Source: As of 19 October 2010

Jonathan Garth is an Irish former professional rugby league footballer who played in the 1990s. He played at representative level for Ireland, and at club level for Dublin Blues.

== International honours ==
Jonathan Garth a won cap for Ireland while at Dublin Blues 1996 1-cap.
