= Hanlan =

Hanlan is a surname. Notable people with the surname include:

- Brandon Hanlan (born 1997), English footballer
- Lee Hanlan (born 1971), English rugby league player
- Ned Hanlan (1855–1908), Canadian sculler, hotelier, and alderman
- Olivier Hanlan (born 1993), Canadian basketball player
