= Olari =

Olari may refer to:

== Places ==
- Olarikara, a village in Thrissur district Kerala, India
- Olari, Espoo, a district of the city of Espoo, Finland

=== Romania ===
- Olari, Arad, a commune in Arad County
- Olari, Prahova, a commune in Prahova County

== Other uses ==
- Olari (name), a given name and surname (including a list of people with the name)
