= Eric Doyle =

Eric Doyle may refer to:

- Eric Doyle (rugby league), Irish rugby league footballer
- Eric Doyle (sailor), American sailor
- Eric Doyle (Heroes), a fictional character in the TV series Heroes
