= Jonathan Garth =

Jonathan Garth may refer to:

- Jonathan Garth (cricketer, born 1965), Irish cricketer
- Jonathan Garth (cricketer, born 2000), his son, Irish cricketer
- Jonathan Garth (rugby league), Irish rugby league player
