= Clive Gee =

Irish rugby league footballer

Personal information
- Full name: Clive Gee

Playing information
Club
Years	Team	Pld	T	G	FG	P
	Laois Panthers	0	0	0	0	0
Representative
Years	Team	Pld	T	G	FG	P
2007	Ireland	1	0	0	0	0
- As of 27 May 2021

Clive Gee (birth unknown) is an Irish rugby league footballer who played in the 2000s. He played at representative level for Ireland, and at club level in the Irish Elite League for the Portlaoise Panthers (in Portlaoise).

== Background ==
Clive Gee was born in Ireland.
