= Paul Koloi =

Tongan rugby league footballer (born 1972)

Personal information
- Born: 25 December 1972 (age 52)
- Height: 188 cm (6 ft 2 in)
- Weight: 89 kg (14 st 0 lb)

Playing information
- Position: Fullback, Centre
Club
Years	Team	Pld	T	G	FG	P
19??	Riccarton-Lincoln (CRL)
1995–96	Canterbury Cardinals
1997	Wigan Warriors	5	1	0	0	4
	Total	5	1	0	0	4
Representative
Years	Team	Pld	T	G	FG	P
1996–2000	Tonga	4	0	0	0	0
- Source: RLP

Paul Koloi (born 25 December 1972) is a Tongan rugby league footballer who represented Tonga in the 2000 World Cup.

== Playing career ==
A Riccarton-Lincoln junior in the Canterbury Rugby League, Koloi played for the Canterbury Cardinals in the 1995 and 1996 Lion Red Cups. He played for Tonga in the 1996 Pacific Challenge.

Koloi was signed by the Wigan Warriors in 1997 on a two-year deal. However he was released at the end of his first season.

In 1998 Koloi returned to Riccarton-Lincoln and again represented Canterbury.

He made his debut for Tonga in 1999 and was included in their 2000 World Cup squad where he played in three matches. In 2000 he was playing for Mackay in Queensland.

In 2003 he returned to England, joining the London Skolars.
