= Eugene McEntegart =

Irish rugby league footballer

Personal information
- Full name: Eugene Micheal John McEntegart III
- Born: 1968 (age 56–57) unknown

Playing information
- Height: 6 ft 1 in (1.85 m)
- Weight: 15 st 13 lb (101 kg)
- Position: Wing, Centre
Club
Years	Team	Pld	T	G	FG	P
≤1995–≥95	Dublin Blues
Representative
Years	Team	Pld	T	G	FG	P
1995	Ireland

Eugene McEntegart (born 1968) is an Irish former professional rugby league footballer who played in the 1990s and early 2000s. He represented Ireland at the international level and played at club level for Dublin Blues.

== International honours ==
Eugene McEntegart won a cap for Ireland while playing for Dublin Blues in 1995, earning 1 cap.
