= Sean Cleary (rugby league) =

Ireland international rugby league footballer

Personal information
- Full name: Sean Cleary
- Born: unknown

Playing information
Club
Years	Team	Pld	T	G	FG	P
≤1996–≥98	Dublin Blues
Representative
Years	Team	Pld	T	G	FG	P
1996–98	Ireland	4
- Source: As of 18 October 2010

Sean Cleary (birth unknown) is an Irish former professional rugby league footballer who played in the 1990s. He played at representative level for Ireland, and at club level for Dublin Blues.

== International honours ==
Sean Cleary won caps for Ireland while at Dublin Blues 1996...1998 1-cap + 3-caps (sub).
