= Neil Roden =

Irish rugby league footballer

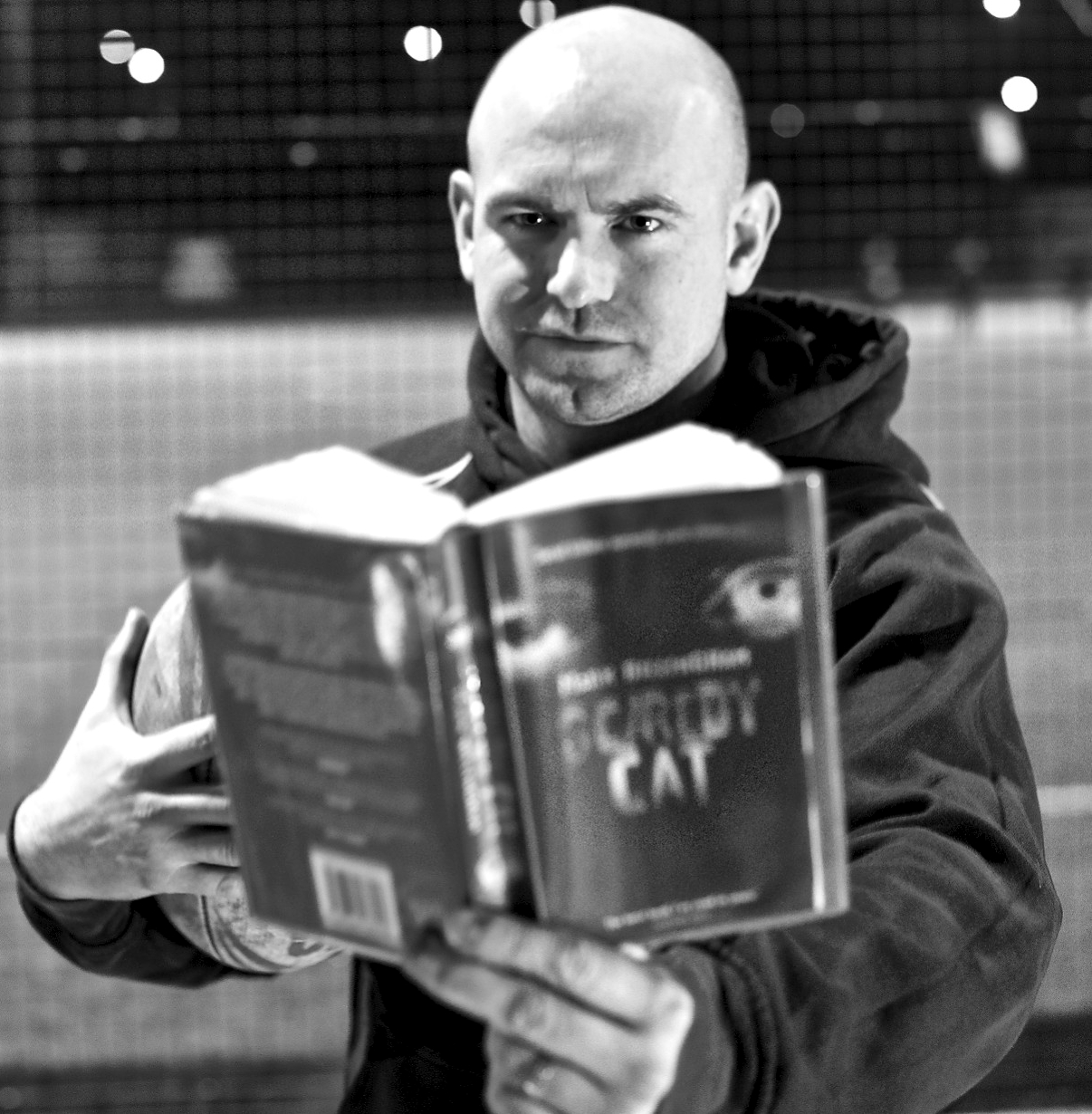

Personal information
- Full name: Neil Roden
- Born: 9 April 1980 (age 45); Wigan, Greater Manchester, England

Playing information
- Position: Stand-off, Scrum-half
Club
Years	Team	Pld	T	G	FG	P
2000	Lancashire Lynx	7	1	0	0	4
2000–04	Oldham	138	65	0	18	278
2005–06	Batley Bulldogs	33	11	0	2	46
2006	Leigh Centurions	4	0	0	0	0
2007–13	Oldham	157	48	0	7	199
	Total	339	125	0	27	527
Representative
Years	Team	Pld	T	G	FG	P
2003	Ireland	2	0	0	0	0

Neil Roden (born 9 April 1980) is a former rugby league footballer who usually played as a stand-off or scrum-half. He made his professional debut in 2000 with Lancashire Lynx, but spent the majority of his playing career with Oldham, making a total of nearly 300 appearances for the club. He also had spells with Leigh Centurions and Batley Bulldogs, and played at international level for Ireland, winning two caps in 2003.

== Playing career ==
=== Club career ===
Born in Wigan, Roden started his career with hometown club Wigan Warriors. Unable to break into the first team, he was loaned out to Lancashire Lynx, where he made his senior debut against Whitehaven in January 2000. He was signed by Oldham a few months later, and made his first appearance for the club in April 2000 against Sheffield Eagles.

Roden returned to Oldham for the 2007 season, signing a two-year contract with the club. He was named as Oldham's captain ahead of the 2011 season.

Roden announced his retirement in October 2013.

=== International honours ===
Roden won two caps for Ireland while at Oldham in 2003.
