= Ali Davys =

Cook Islands international rugby league footballer

Personal information
- Full name: Alistair Davys
- Born: 1 July 1970 (age 55) Australia

Playing information
- Position: Halfback
Club
Years	Team	Pld	T	G	FG	P
1992–93	Gold Coast Seagulls	30	1	0	0	4
1995–96	Salford Reds
1997	Huddersfield Giants
	Total	30	1	0	0	4
Representative
Years	Team	Pld	T	G	FG	P
	Cook Islands

Alistair "Ali" Davys (born 1 July 1970) is a former rugby league footballer who played as a Halfback. He played for Gold Coast Seagulls in the New South Wales Rugby League and English clubs Salford City Reds and Huddersfield Giants.

Davys began his career in New Zealand with the Wainuiomata Lions. He helped them win the National Club Competition in 1990, scoring a try in a 34–12 win against Otahuhu at Carlaw Park. In November 1991, he joined the Gold Coast Seagulls in the Australian Winfield Cup competition.

At international level, he represented Cook Islands, helping the team win the 1995 Rugby League Emerging Nations Tournament.
