= Olari (name) =

Male given name

Ilmar
- Gender: Male

Origin
- Region of origin: Estonia

Olari is an Estonian given name and a surname. Notable persons with that name include:

== People with the given name ==
- Olari Elts (born 1971), Estonian conductor
- Olari Taal (born 1953), Estonian businessman and politician

== People with the surname ==
- Andrei Olari, Russian rugby league player
- Silvia Olari (born 1988), Italian singer
