= Scott Dyson =

Irish rugby league footballer

Personal information
- Full name: Scott Dyson

Playing information
- Position: Stand-off
Club
Years	Team	Pld	T	G	FG	P
≤2001–≥01	Gateshead Thunder
Representative
Years	Team	Pld	T	G	FG	P
2001	Ireland	1

Scott Dyson is a professional rugby league footballer who played in the 2000s. He played at representative level for Ireland, and at club level for Gateshead Thunder, as a stand-off.

== International honours ==
Dyson won a cap for Ireland while at Gateshead Thunder 2001 1-cap (sub).
