= Simon Manuel =

Ireland international rugby league footballer

Personal information
- Full name: Simon Manuel
- Born: New Zealand

Playing information
Club
Years	Team	Pld	T	G	FG	P
≤2004–≥04	Kilkenny Wildcats
Representative
Years	Team	Pld	T	G	FG	P
2004	Ireland	1
- Source: As of 16 May 2012

Simon Manuel is a professional rugby league footballer who played in the 2000s. He played at representative level for Ireland, and at club level for Kilkenny Wildcats.

== International honours ==
Manuel won a cap for Ireland while at Kilkenny Wildcats 2004 1-cap (sub).
