= Steve Nolan =

Ireland international rugby league footballer

Personal information
- Full name: Steve Nolan
- Born: unknown

Playing information
Club
Years	Team	Pld	T	G	FG	P
2006	Treaty City Titans
Representative
Years	Team	Pld	T	G	FG	P
2006	Ireland	1
- Source: As of 20 October 2010

Steve Nolan (birth unknown) is an Irish professional rugby league footballer who played in the 2000s. He played at representative level for Ireland, and at club level for Treaty City Titans.

== International honours ==
Nolan won a cap for Ireland while at Treaty City Titans 2006 1-cap (sub).
