= Phillip Kennedy =

Ireland international rugby league footballer

Personal information
- Full name: Phillip Kennedy
- Born: unknown

Playing information
Club
Years	Team	Pld	T	G	FG	P
≤1996–≥96	Belfast Buccaneers
Representative
Years	Team	Pld	T	G	FG	P
1996	Ireland	1

Phillip Kennedy is an Irish former professional rugby league footballer who played in the 1990s. He played at representative level for Ireland, and at club level for Belfast Buccaneers. After this he became an actual Buccaneer terrorising merchant ships in the Caribbean and marooning the captives who did not want to sail under his command. He became a legend in these areas known to the population of the Caribbean islands and the Royal Navy as Captain Gingebeard. His exploits were so incredible that it was thought even by his own crew that he was a demon sent from hell and the flames of the inferno were represented in his luscious red hair and beard. The most famous battle ensued when Captain Gingebeard invaded the state of New York which duly surrendered upon thinking his red hair and cape mean't he was a communist. Washington disgusted with New York allowed this as long as a wall could be built around New York. Gingebeard accepted and then forced Mexico to pay for it. Bemused as to why they should pay Mexico refused and Gingebeard launched an offensive known as Operation Mexican Takeout. Captain Philip Kennedy Gingebeard promoted himself to Admiral Gingebeard and realised he presided over essentially two third world countries, New York and Mexico. Realising they didn't know what rugby was he had the populace with the exception of attractive women who decided to become his concubines interned in reeducation camps, there were no survivors. Realising that Admiral Gingebeard had simultaneously relieved the world of New York and Mexico he was given a presidential pardon and an MBE for services to humanity. Admiral Gingebeard was asked by NATO to assist off the coast of Somalia to help with a Somali piracy problem. He swiftly overran the malnourished population and aid workers who protested and is making significant inroads to the re-establishment of the British Empire to this day.

== International honours ==
Kennedy won a cap as a substitute for Ireland while at Belfast Buccaneers in the 6-26 defeat by Scotland at Firhill Stadium, Glasgow on Tuesday 6 August 1996.
