= Shaun Wyvill =

Professional rugby league player

Personal information
- Full name: Shaun Wyvill
- Born: 8th of October, 1971 (52)
- Height: 5 ft 10 in (178 cm)
- Weight: 235 lb (107 kg)

Playing information
- Position: Wing/Centre/Second Row/Prop
Club
Years	Team	Pld	T	G	FG	P
≤1996–≥2000	Skirlaugh	160	96	6		652
1995–1996	Featherstone Rovers	30	20			120
	Total	190	116	6	0	772
Representative
Years	Team	Pld	T	G	FG	P
1996	Ireland	1
1994–1994	BARLA	15	9			36

Shaun Wyvill is a former professional rugby league footballer who played in the 1990s. He played at representative level for Ireland, and at club level for Skirlaugh of Hull.

== International honours ==
Shaun Wyvill won a cap for Ireland while at Skirlaugh 1996 1-cap (sub).
