= Gavin Gordon (rugby league) =

Ireland international rugby league footballer

Personal information
- Full name: Gavin Gordon
- Born: 28 February 1978 (age 47) unknown

Playing information
- Height: 4 ft 11 in (1.50 m)
- Position: Fullback
Club
Years	Team	Pld	T	G	FG	P
2000	Lancashire Lynx	2	0	0	0	0
2003	North London Skolars	2	0	0	0	0
	Total	4	0	0	0	0
Representative
Years	Team	Pld	T	G	FG	P
1995–01	Ireland	6	4	0	0	16

Gavin Gordon (born 28 February 1978) is an Irish former professional rugby league footballer who played in the 1990s and 2000s. He played at representative level for Ireland, and at club level for Lancashire Lynx and North London Skolars, as a fullback.

== International honours ==
Gavin Gordon won six caps for Ireland between 1995 and 2001.

Gordon was threatened with being banned from rugby union by his school if he played in the 1995 Rugby League Emerging Nations Tournament, but this threat was eventually withdrawn. He became the youngest ever rugby league international, aged 17 years and 229 days old, when he debuted for Ireland against Moldova at Spotland Stadium, Rochdale on Monday 16 October 1995.
