= Phelim Comerford =

Ireland international rugby league footballer

Personal information
- Full name: Phelim Comerford
- Born: Ireland

Playing information
- Position: Wing
Club
| Years | Team | Pld | T | G | FG | P |
|---|---|---|---|---|---|---|
| ≤1995–≥97 | Dublin Blues |
Representative
| Years | Team | Pld | T | G | FG | P |
| 1995–97 | Ireland | 4 | 2 | 16 | 0 | 40 |
- Source: As of 17 February 2021

Phelim Comerford (birth unknown) is an Irish former professional rugby league footballer who played in the 1990s. He played at representative level for Ireland, and at club level for Dublin Blues, as a wing.

== International honours ==
Comerford won 5 caps for Ireland in 1995–1997 while at Dublin Blues.
