= Garret Molloy =

Ireland international rugby league footballer

Personal information
- Full name: Garret Molloy
- Born: Limerick
- Height: 2.01 m (6 ft 7 in)
- Weight: 150 kg (23 st 9 lb) as of 1990

Playing information
- Position: Second-row
Club
Years	Team	Pld	T	G	FG	P
≤1994–≥99	Dublin Blues Garryowen Lansdowne
Representative
Years	Team	Pld	T	G	FG	P
1999	Ireland	1
- Source: As of 19 October 2010

Garret Molloy (birth unknown) is an Irish former professional rugby league footballer who played in the 1990s. He played at representative level for Ireland, and at club level for Dublin Blues. He has 2 AIL medals with Garryowen from the 91/92 and the 93/94 season. He played at various levels for lansdowne fc in Dublin, winning winning multiple cups there including the metro cup in 1997/98

== International honours ==
Garret Molloy won a cap for Ireland while at Dublin Blues 1999 1-cap (sub).
