= Tim Bergin =

Ireland international rugby league footballer

Personal information
- Full name: Timothy Bergin
- Born: 29 July 1985 (age 41) Abbeyleix, Republic of Ireland

Playing information
- Position: Wing
Club
Years	Team	Pld	T	G	FG	P
2010–12	Sheffield Eagles	42	14	26	0	108
2013	Gloucestershire All Golds	16	3	6	0	24
	Total	58	17	32	0	132
Representative
Years	Team	Pld	T	G	FG	P
2009–12	Ireland	10	7	0	0	28
- Source: As of 18 August 2013

Tim Bergin (born 29 July 1985) is an Irish rugby league footballer who has played in the 2010s. He has played at representative level for Ireland, and at club level in the Co-operative Championship for the Sheffield Eagles, and for the Gloucestershire All Golds, as a wing.

== Background ==
Tim Bergin was born in Abbeyleix, Republic of Ireland.

== Playing career ==
In October 2009, Bergin became the first Laois Panthers player to be selected for Ireland when he was named in the squad for the 2009 European Cup.

On 3 November 2011 The annual RLIF Awards dinner was held at the Tower of London, and Bergin was named Ireland's player of the year.

On 6 October 2012, Bergin announced to his fans on Facebook that he was taking a break from the game to pursue other opportunities. Loverugbyleague.com announced on 21 January 2013 that Bergin has returned to the game and signed for University of Gloucestershire All Golds.
