= Lee Hanlan =

Irish rugby league footballer

Personal information
- Full name: Lee Hanlan
- Born: 6 October 1971 (age 53)

Playing information
- Position: Centre, Stand-off
Club
Years	Team	Pld	T	G	FG	P
1990–92	Hull FC	2	1	0	0	4
1992–93	Batley	32	10	7	2	54
1993–95	Wakefield Trinity	43	6	7	2	40
1995–96	Hunslet	29	7	0	5	33
1997	Keighley	8	0	0	0	0
1997	Halifax
1998	York Wasps	1	0	0	0	0
	Total	115	24	14	9	131
Representative
Years	Team	Pld	T	G	FG	P
1996–97	Ireland	2	0	0	0	0

Lee Hanlan (born 6 October 1971) is a former professional rugby league footballer who played in the 1990s. He played at representative level for Ireland, and at club level for Hull FC, Batley, Wakefield Trinity, Hunslet, in 1997's Super League II for Halifax, and York Wasps, as a centre or stand-off.
