= Liam Horrigan =

Former Ireland international rugby league footballer

Personal information
- Full name: Liam Horrigan

Playing information
Club
Years	Team	Pld	T	G	FG	P
≤1995–≥95	Woolston Rovers
Representative
Years	Team	Pld	T	G	FG	P
1995	Ireland	2
- Source: As of 16 May 2012

Liam Horrigan is a former professional rugby league footballer who played in the 1990s. He played at representative level for Ireland, and at club level for Woolston Rovers (in Warrington).

== International honours ==
Liam Horrigan won caps for Ireland while at Woolston Rovers 1995 2-caps.

== Post-retirement ==
In 2013 he started at Manchester Academy as Vice Principal – Safeguarding & Operations

In 2022, Horrigan was inducted into the Woolston Rovers hall of fame.
