= Ged Corcoran =

Former Ireland international rugby league footballer

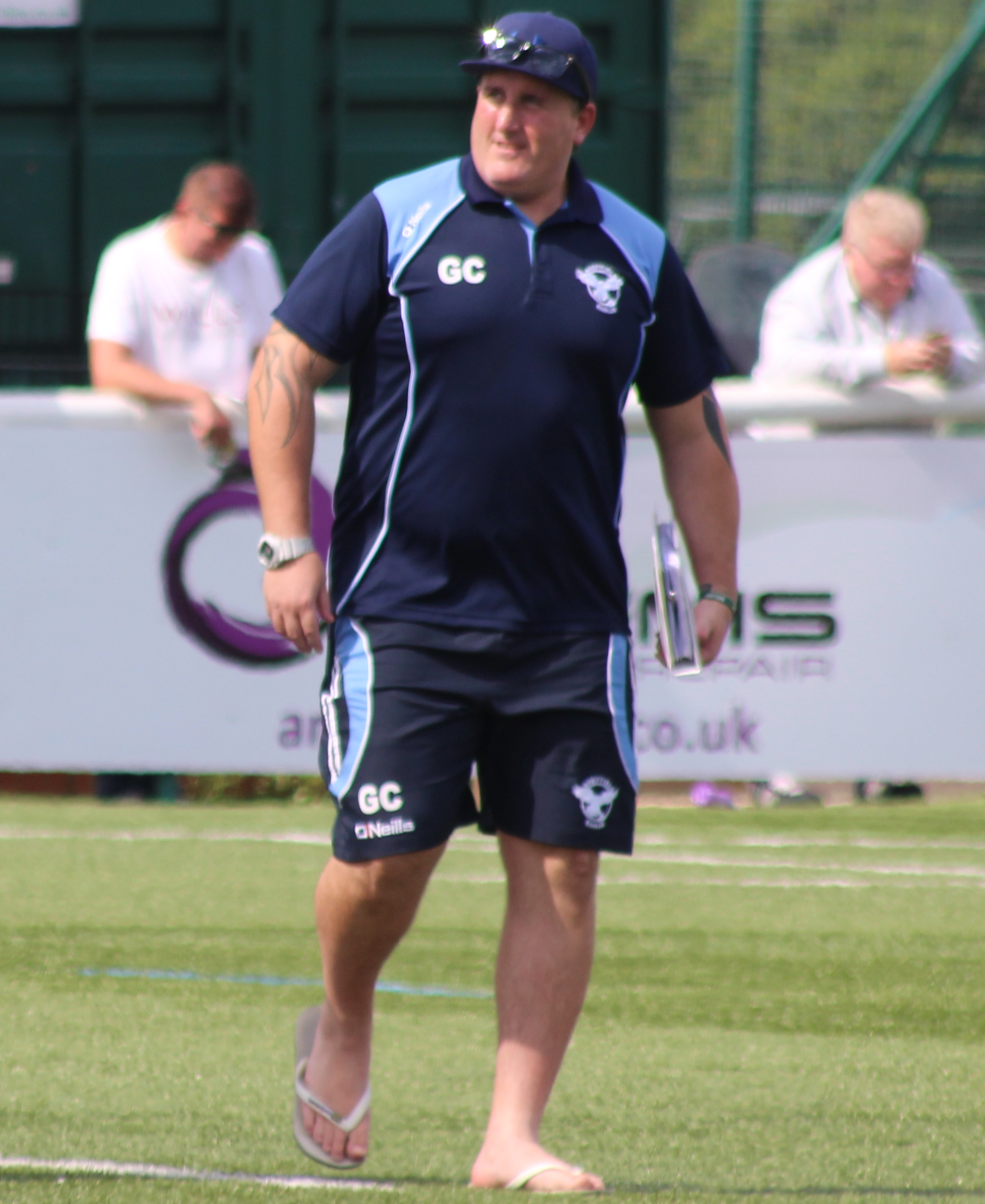

Personal information
- Full name: Ged Corcoran
- Born: 28 March 1983 (age 43) County Offaly, Ireland
- Height: 6 ft 0 in (1.83 m)
- Weight: 15 st 10 lb (100 kg)

Playing information
- Position: Prop, Second-row
Club
Years	Team	Pld	T	G	FG	P
2003–04	Halifax	35	2	0	0	8
2005	Dewsbury Rams	13	1	0	2	6
2006	Oldham	14	1	0	0	4
2007–10	Sheffield Eagles	65	6	0	0	24
2011	Toulouse Olympique	13	2	0	0	8
	Total	140	12	0	2	50
Representative
Years	Team	Pld	T	G	FG	P
2004–11	Ireland	11	1	0	0	4

Coaching information
Representative
Years	Team	Gms	W	D	L	W%
2022–	Ireland	7	4	0	3	57
- Source: As of 15 November 2026

Ged Corcoran (born 28 March 1983) is an Irish professional rugby league coach, who is the head coach of Ireland, and assistant coach at Championship side Featherstone Rovers, and a former professional rugby league footballer.

He played at international level for Ireland, and at club level for Halifax in the Super League, as well as the Dewsbury Rams, Oldham, the Sheffield Eagles and Toulouse Olympique, as a prop or second-row. Ged Corcoran is the elder brother of the Rochdale Hornets rugby league footballer Dwayne Corcoran and is a first team coach with the Sheffield Eagles.

== Background ==
Corcoran was born in County Offaly, Ireland.

Ged Corcoran was named in the Ireland training squad for the 2008 Rugby League World Cup, and the Ireland squad for the 2008 Rugby League World Cup.
