= George Slicker =

Irish rugby league footballer

Personal information
- Full name: George Slicker

Playing information
Club
Years	Team	Pld	T	G	FG	P
≤1995–≥95	Halifax
Representative
Years	Team	Pld	T	G	FG	P
1995	Ireland	2

George Slicker is a former professional rugby league footballer who played in the 1990s. He played at representative level for Ireland, and at club level for Halifax.

== International honours ==
George Slicker won a cap for Ireland while at Halifax 1995, one cap plus one as substitute.
