= Karl Fitzpatrick =

RL administrator and former Ireland international rugby league footballer

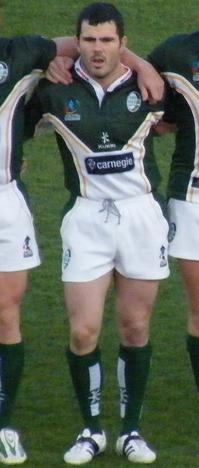

Personal information
- Born: 13 September 1980 (age 46) Wigan, Greater Manchester, England

Playing information
- Height: 5 ft 9 in (1.75 m)
- Weight: 12 st 6 lb (79 kg)
- Position: Fullback
Club
Years	Team	Pld	T	G	FG	P
2000	Widnes Vikings	18	3	0	2	14
2001	Tonneins XIII
2002	Swinton Lions	16	6	0	1	25
2003–10	Salford City Reds	139	49	2	0	200
	Total	173	58	2	3	239
Representative
Years	Team	Pld	T	G	FG	P
2004–09	Ireland	5	9	5	0	46

Karl Fitzpatrick (born 13 September 1980) is a former Ireland international rugby league fullback, and Chief executive officer of the Warrington Wolves in the Super League.

== Playing career ==
Fitzpatrick was originally a scrum half before he switched to full back. He is a product of Wigan St Patricks. Fitzpatrick began his professional career at Widnes Vikings, followed by spells at Tonneins XIII (France) and Swinton Lions.

Fitzpatrick signed for Salford in 2003. In 2004, Fitzpatrick represented Ireland in the Rugby League European Cup, and also picked up the most improved player award at Salford.

He was named in the Ireland squad for the 2008 Rugby League World Cup.
