= David Buckley (rugby league) =

Irish rugby league player

Personal information
- Full name: David Buckley

Playing information
- Position: Prop, Second-row
Club
Years	Team	Pld	T	G	FG	P
≤2007–≥07	York City Knights
Representative
Years	Team	Pld	T	G	FG	P
2007	Ireland	1
- Source: As of 16 May 2012

David "Dave" Buckley is a professional rugby league footballer who has played in the 2000s, He has played at representative level for Ireland, and at club level for York City Knights, as a prop, or second-row.

== International honours ==
Dave Buckley won a cap for Ireland while at York City Knights 2007 1-cap.
