= Paul Owens (rugby league) =

Irish rugby league footballer

Personal information
- Full name: Paul Kevin Owens

Playing information
Representative
Years	Team	Pld	T	G	FG	P
1995	Ireland	3
2005	(BARLA) England Lions	1

Paul Owens is a former professional rugby league footballer who played in the 1990s. He played at representative level for Ireland and (British Amateur Rugby League Association) England Lions, and at club level for Dudley Hill ARLFC (in Bradford).

== International honours ==
Owens won 3 caps for Ireland in 1995 while at Dudley Hill.
