= Innes Gray =

Ireland international rugby league footballer

Personal information
- Full name: Innes Gray
- Born: 1973 (age 51–52) unknown

Playing information
Club
Years	Team	Pld	T	G	FG	P
≤1998–≥98	Bangor Vikings
Representative
Years	Team	Pld	T	G	FG	P
1998	Ireland	2
- Source: As of 19 October 2010

Innes Gray (born 1973) was a sportsman from Northern Ireland, who played rugby union, rugby league and association football. He represented Ireland at rugby league in 1998.

Gray played rugby union until 1998. He represented Ireland at schools level, and played twice for Ireland 'A'. He played club rugby for Instonians and Ballymena, and provincial rugby for Ulster. He left Ballymena in 1998. Switching to rugby league, he won two caps for Ireland while at Bangor Vikings. He went on to play soccer in the Irish League for Cliftonville and Ballyclare Comrades, and became player/manager of Queen's University Belfast A.F.C. in 2001.

He now works as a teacher at Royal Belfast Academical Institution.
