= Bryan Smyth (rugby league) =

Ireland international rugby league footballer

Playing information
- Position: Prop
Representative
Years	Team	Pld	T	G	FG	P
1995	Ireland	3

Bryan Smyth is a rugby league footballer who played in the 1990s. He played at representative level for Ireland, and at club level for Illingworth ARLFC (in Halifax, of the Pennine League), as a prop.

== International honours ==
Smyth won three caps for Ireland while at Illingworth in 1995.
