= Michael Browne (rugby league) =

Ireland international rugby league footballer

Personal information
- Full name: Michael Browne
- Born: unknown

Playing information
Club
| Years | Team | Pld | T | G | FG | P |
|---|---|---|---|---|---|---|
| ≤1995–≥95 | Tallaght Tigers |
Representative
| Years | Team | Pld | T | G | FG | P |
| 1995 | Ireland | 2 |
- As of 19 October 2010

Michael Browne (birth unknown) is an Irish former professional rugby league footballer who played in the 1990s. He played at representative level for Ireland, and at club level for Tallaght Tigers.

== International honours ==
Michael Browne won caps for Ireland while at Tallaght Tigers 1995 1-cap plus 1 as substitute.
