= Wayne Kerr =

Former Ireland international rugby league footballer

Personal information
- Born: 18 March 1984 (age 42) Dublin, Ireland
- Height: 5 ft 11 in (1.80 m)
- Weight: 16 st 8 lb (105 kg)

Playing information

Rugby league
- Position: Prop
Club
Years	Team	Pld	T	G	FG	P
2008	London Skolars	5	10	0	0	40
2009–10	Oldham R.L.F.C.	51	10	0	0	40
	Carlow Crusaders
	Longhorns RL
2021	Athboy Fighting Irish
	Total	56	20	0	0	80
Representative
Years	Team	Pld	T	G	FG	P
2006–16	Ireland	17	0	0	0	0

Rugby union
- Position: Blindside Flanker
Club
Years	Team	Pld	T	G	FG	P
	Cill Dara RFC
- As of 3 February 2021

Wayne Kerr (born 14 March 1985) is an Irish professional rugby league footballer who played for Oldham in the Championship One. He is an Ireland international. He has previously played for London Skolars and Carlow Crusaders.

== Background ==
Kerr was born in Dublin, Ireland. Nicknamed "Slasher" on account of his aggressive and athletic playing style. He grew up in County Kildare.

== Playing career ==
He was a member of the Ireland squad for the 2008 Rugby League World Cup, and went on to make one appearance in the tournament.

He now plays Rugby Union with Cill Dara RFC. He plays blindside flanker (number 6).

In 2016, he was called up to the Ireland squad for the 2017 Rugby League World Cup European Pool B qualifiers.
