= Gary Grainey =

Irish rugby league footballer

Personal information
- Full name: Gary Grainey

Playing information
Club
Years	Team	Pld	T	G	FG	P
≤1995–≥95	Leigh Miners Rangers
1995/96–96	Leigh Centurions
	Total	0	0	0	0	0
Representative
Years	Team	Pld	T	G	FG	P
1995	Ireland	3
- Source: As of 20 October 2010

Gary Grainey is a former professional rugby league footballer who played in the 1990s. He played at representative level for Ireland, and at club level for Leigh Miners Rangers and Leigh Centurions.

== International honours ==
Gary Grainey won caps for Ireland while at Leigh Miners Rangers 1995 2-caps plus 1 as substitute.
