= Sonny Shepherd =

Cook Island rugby league footballer

Playing information
Representative
Years	Team	Pld	T	G	FG	P
1995–2000	Cook Islands

Sonny Shepherd is a Cook Island former professional rugby league footballer who played in the 1990s and 2000s. He played at representative level for the Cook Islands, and at club level for Ngatangiia/Matavera Sea Eagles.

== Playing career ==
Shepherd played for the Ngatangiia/Matavera Sea Eagles in the Cook Islands domestic competition.

Shepherd played for the Cook Islands in the 1995 Emerging Nations Tournament and at the 2000 Rugby League World Cup.
