= Eric Doyle (rugby league) =

Ireland international rugby league footballer

Personal information
- Full name: Eric Doyle
- Born: Dublin

Playing information
- Position: hooker / halfback
Club
Years	Team	Pld	T	G	FG	P
≤1996–≥96	Dublin Blues
Representative
Years	Team	Pld	T	G	FG	P
1996	Ireland	2
- Source: As of 8 April 2010

Eric Doyle (birth unknown) is an Irish former professional rugby league footballer who played in the 1990s. He played at representative level for Ireland, and at club level for Dublin Blues.

== International honours ==
Captained Ireland & won caps for Ireland while at Dublin Blues 1996 11 caps (sub).
