= Tony Nuttall (rugby league) =

Irish rugby league footballer

Anthony Nuttall
Personal information
- Full name: Anthony Nuttall
- Born: 25 July 1968 (age 57)

Playing information
Club
Years	Team	Pld	T	G	FG	P
≤1995–≥95	Newsome Magpies
≤1996–≥97	Oldham Bears	9
	Total	9	0	0	0	0
Representative
Years	Team	Pld	T	G	FG	P
1995–97	Ireland	4
- Source: As of 16 May 2012

Anthony Nuttall (born 25 July 1968) is a former professional rugby league footballer who played in the 1990s. He played at representative level for Ireland, and at club level for Newsome Magpies (in Huddersfield), and Oldham Bears.

== International honours ==
Tony Nuttall won two caps for Ireland in 1995–1997 while at Newsome Magpies, and Oldham Bears + 1-cap (sub).
