= Carl De Chenu =

Irish rugby league footballer and coach

Personal information
- Full name: Carl De Chenu
- Born: 18 June 1982 (age 43) Dublin, Ireland
- Height: 5 ft 11 in (1.80 m)
- Weight: 14 st 0 lb (89 kg)

Playing information
- Position: Wing, Centre
Club
| Years | Team | Pld | T | G | FG | P |
|---|---|---|---|---|---|---|
| 2003–04 | Sheffield Eagles | 41 | 22 | 0 | 0 | 88 |
| 2006 | Celtic Crusaders | 29 | 21 | 0 | 0 | 84 |
| | Total | 70 | 43 | 0 | 0 | 172 |
Representative
| Years | Team | Pld | T | G | FG | P |
| 2003–04 | Ireland | 4 | 1 | 0 | 0 | 4 |

Coaching information
Club
| Years | Team | Gms | W | D | L | W% |
| 2020– | Dublin Blues | 100 | 72 | 2 | 26 | 72 |
Representative
| Years | Team | Gms | W | D | L | W% |
| 2016–18 | Ireland | 8 | 7 | 0 | 1 | 88 |
- Source: As of 10 October 2023

Carl De Chenu is a former professional rugby league footballer who played in the 2000s. He played at representative level for Ireland, Ireland A and Ireland Students, and at club level for Sheffield Eagles and Celtic Crusaders, as a wing, or centre.

== Personal life ==
He attended Newpark Comprehensive School in Blackrock, Dublin.

== International honours ==
Carl De Chenu won 4 caps (1 as substitute) for Ireland in 2003–2004 while at Sheffield Eagles.

For the Senior national team he holds heritage number #107.
