= Ricky Smith (rugby league) =

New Zealand rugby league footballer

Playing information
- Position: Centre
Representative
Years	Team	Pld	T	G	FG	P
1995	Ireland	3	1	0	0	4

Ricky Smith is a former rugby league footballer who played as a centre. He played at representative level for Ireland.

== International honours ==
Smith won three caps for Ireland in 1995.
