= Craig McElhatton =

Ireland international rugby league footballer

Personal information
- Full name: Craig McElhatton

Playing information
Club
Years	Team	Pld	T	G	FG	P
≤1995–≥95	Dudley Hill
≤1997–≥97	Bradford Bulls
	Total	0	0	0	0	0
Representative
Years	Team	Pld	T	G	FG	P
1995–97	Ireland	5

Craig McElhatton is a former professional rugby league footballer who played in the 1990s. He played at representative level for Ireland, and at club level for Dudley Hill and Bradford Bulls. Craig was a Great Britain junior. He was a genuine half-back, playing at both scrum-half and stand-off. His junior career started in the under 7s at Stanley Rangers. He played at Stanley through to the under 17s before moving to Normanton. Craig signed professional for Wakefield Trinity. He also played for Nottingham, Hunslet and the Bradford Bulls.

== International honours ==
Craig McElhatton won 4 caps (plus 1 as substitute) for Ireland in 1995–1997 while at Dudley Hill, and Bradford Bulls.
