= Brian Carney (rugby) =

Irish professional sportsman and commentator

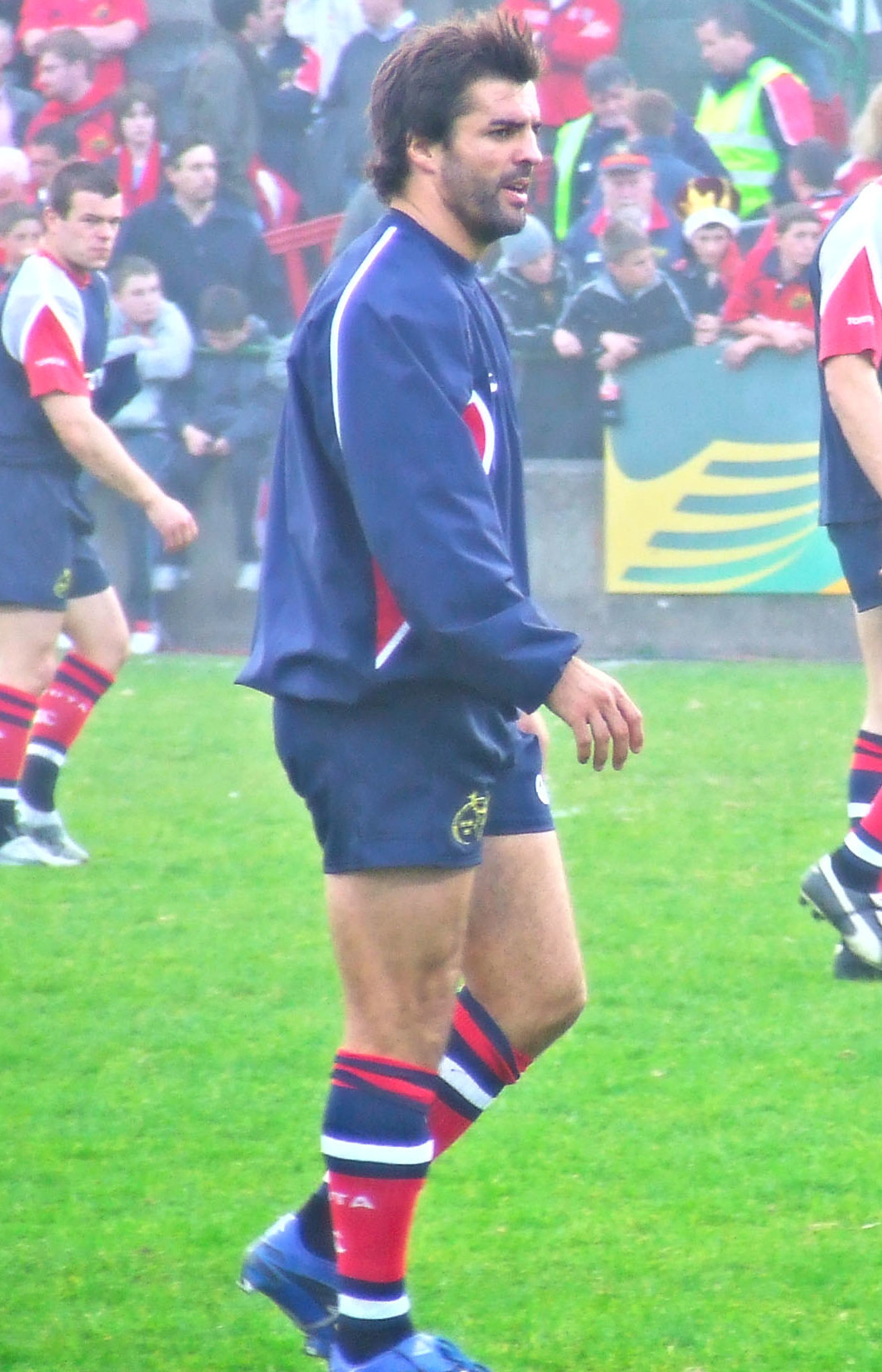

Personal information
- Born: 23 July 1976 (age 49) Cork, Ireland

Playing information
- Height: 5 ft 11 in (1.80 m)
- Weight: 14 st 5 lb (91 kg)

Rugby league
- Position: Wing
Club
Years	Team	Pld	T	G	FG	P
1997–99	Dublin Blues	30	37
1999	Gateshead Thunder	5	2	0	0	8
2000	Hull F.C.	19	8	0	0	32
2001–05	Wigan Warriors	111	48	1	0	194
2006	Newcastle Knights	26	16	0	0	64
2009	Warrington Wolves	4	2	0	0	8
	Total	195	113	1	0	306
Representative
Years	Team	Pld	T	G	FG	P
1998–00	Ireland	8	3	0	0	12
2003–06	Great Britain	14	8	0	0	32
2003	Lancashire	1	0	0	0	0

Rugby union
- Position: Wing
Club
Years	Team	Pld	T	G	FG	P
2007–09	Munster	20	5	1	0	27
Representative
Years	Team	Pld	T	G	FG	P
2007–09	Ireland	4	1	0	0	5
2009	Ireland 7s	5	3	0	0	15

Brian Carney (born 23 July 1976) is an Irish professional rugby league commentator and former dual-code rugby international player. He most recently played rugby league for Warrington Wolves, but he also played for Gateshead Thunder, Hull F.C. and Wigan Warriors in the Super League, as well as Newcastle Knights in the National Rugby League. Carney crossed codes to play rugby union for Munster between 2007 and 2009. He earned caps for international representation, for Ireland in both rugby league and rugby union, and also Great Britain and Ireland in rugby league. He also played Gaelic football as a junior.

== Early life ==
Carney played Gaelic football for Valleymount GAA in west county Wicklow and won a junior championship medal in 1998 with the club. He also played rugby union at Clongowes Wood College and Lansdowne R.F.C. His first rugby league experience came with Irish amateurs Dublin Blues.

== Playing career ==
=== Early career ===
Carney first made an impression on the rugby league scene playing for the Irish Students side in a home international tournament in 1998. His impressive form led to a number of Super League clubs vying for his talents and he opted to sign with Gateshead Thunder.

=== Super League ===
Carney played for Gateshead in the 1999 season and moved with them to Hull F.C. after the clubs merged in 2000.

Carney transferred from Hull F.C. to Wigan at the end of the 2000 Super League season. He had come to the attention of the Wigan board – who were very impressed with him – when he scored a try against Wigan in Gateshead's Super League on the Road victory at Tynecastle. Future Wigan scrum-half Willie Peters, also shone in the same match. Since making the professional ranks, Carney, who is a qualified lawyer, was a regular in the senior colours of Ireland and featured heavily in the Lincoln Financial World Cup of 2000. Carney played for Wigan on the wing in their 2001 Super League Grand Final loss against Bradford.

Carney signed a new three-year contract with Wigan in May 2003, ending speculation that had been linking him with a move to Irish rugby union. After signing the deal, Carney commented: "I love it here at Wigan. I never wanted to play for any other club. I just want to get better and better each week and keep my place in the first team. The spirit and friendship at this club is brilliant and I need to be part of it." His arrival at Wigan was initially hampered by injury but when he did break into the team, he was impressive. Carney played for Wigan on the wing in the 2003 Super League Grand Final which was lost to Bradford. He'd forced himself into the Great Britain team for the 2003 Ashes series. Carney made his GB and Ireland début in the First Test played at the JJB Stadium, becoming the first Irishman to play for Great Britain and Ireland since Tom McKinney in 1957. In that match Carney scored two tries and was later named Great Britain and Ireland's player of the series. Carney was selected for the 2003 Origin match after opting to play for Lancashire. He was also included in the 2003 Super League 'Dream Team' and the 2003 Rugby League World magazine World XIII, and voted BBC North West's Rugby League Footballer of the Year in the same season.

Despite a hamstring injury restricting his club appearances, Carney was selected in the Great Britain team to compete in the end of season 2004 Rugby League Tri-Nations tournament. In the final against Australia he played on the wing in the Lions' 44–4 loss.

=== National Rugby League ===
In June 2005 Carney agreed to join new National Rugby League franchise team, Australia's Gold Coast Titans, at the end of his Wigan contract. Upon signing the deal, Gold Coast managing director Michael Searle told NRL's official website, www.nrl.com: "The guy genuinely wanted to come here. He wants to challenge himself in the National Rugby League".

Carney was to remain at Wigan for the 2006 season, but a month later he agreed a release from the final year of his Wigan contract to play in the NRL with Newcastle. At the time Carney commented: "I'm very grateful to Wigan, they didn't have to do it (release him from his contract) but I explained my desire to get there because I feel time is running out." Carney made his debut for the Newcastle club at the age of 29 years, 231 days, making him the oldest player in the NRL era (since 1998) to make his first grade debut. Carney scored 16 tries in 26 games for Newcastle, including guiding his team to a 22–12 victory over the Canberra Raiders with a hat-trick of tries. After the game Carney expressed no desire to remain with the Newcastle club, choosing to honour his contract with the Gold Coast. However, on 16 January 2007 he announced his retirement from all forms of rugby after only participating in one training session with the Gold Coast, indicating that he wished to finish his legal studies and spend more time with his family.

=== Rugby union ===
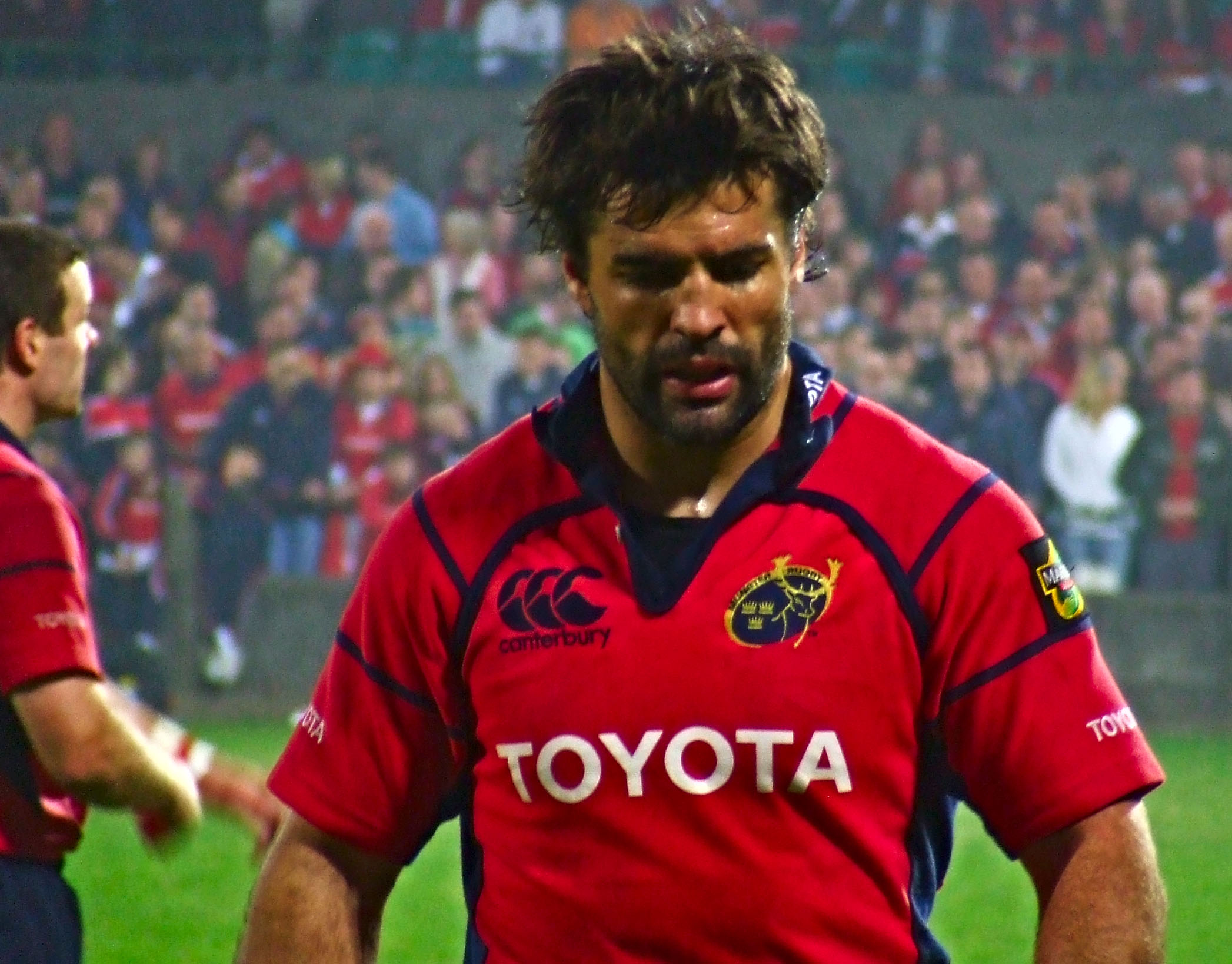
Carney playing for Munster in 2007

On Thursday 15 March 2007, BBC Sport reported that Carney had signed for Munster, switching to rugby union, with speculation rife that he would be fast-tracked onto Ireland's team for its tour of Argentina in summer 2007. Because he had walked out on his contract with the Gold Coast Titans, Munster had to pay compensation to the Australian club to secure Carney's registration. Carney made his début for Munster, against Ulster at Ravenhill on 23 March 2007, scoring a try in the 76th minute. He scored his second try in two matches in an away loss to Ospreys on 7 April. In April 2007, Carney was named in the Ireland squad for their tour of Argentina. In the first Test, Carney's rugby union international début, he scored an interception try minutes into the game.

Carney was selected in the Irish squad for the 2007 Rugby Union World Cup. However, he did not make an appearance at the tournament.

Carney made a try-scoring début for the Barbarians against the Scarlets on 31 January 2009. He participated in the Dubai World Cup Sevens as part of a 12-man Irish squad, finishing up as joint-highest Irish try scorer with three tries. Though Ireland was in a tough pool stage, including Samoa, Australia, and Portugal, Ireland did manage to defeat Australia 24–21, with Carney getting a try. He scored two more tries in the Bowl semi-final victory over Hong Kong. They went on to lose 17–14 to Zimbabwe in the Bowl Final, for an overall ranking of 10th.

=== Return to rugby league ===
On 2 June 2009, the Warrington Wolves announced that they had signed Carney for the remainder of 2009's Super League XIV. The move was Carney's fifth signing to a rugby league team in his playing career, at the age of 32. On 2 June 2009 edition of the Sky Sports rugby league magazine show, Boots N' All, Carney vehemently denied that a return to rugby league would lead to a subsequent career with the England national team, in favour of his own native team. Carney provided commentary for Sky Sport's coverage of the 2009 Super League Grand Final, and the 2009 Gillette Four Nations tournament. He finished his career at Warrington at the end of 2009.

== Media career ==
After ending his playing career, Carney remained with Warrington in a part-time role as a player welfare officer.

In 2010, Carney became a presenter for Sky Sports rugby league coverage.

Carney is also one of the presenters for Sky's coverage of Gaelic games which started in June 2014.

== See also ==
- List of players who have converted from one football code to another
