= Moldova national rugby league team =

The Moldova national rugby league team represented Moldova in the sport of rugby league football. It first competed into international competition in 1993. Moldova has not competed internationally since the 1995 Emerging Nations World Cup although a French author indicated that rugby league was still played in Moldova in 2011.

== Results ==
- France def. Moldova 34–14 (1993)
- BARLA Great Britain Lions def. Moldova 33–14 (May 1994)
- Ireland def. Moldova 48–26 (16 October 1995)
- Moldova def. Morocco 24–19 (18 October 1995)
