= Dublin Blues Rugby League =

Dublin Blues

Club information
- Full name: Dublin Blues RLFC
- Nickname: BLUES
- Short name: Dublin
- Colours: Sky Blue and Navy
- Founded: 1989
- Website: Dublinrl.com

Current details
- Ground: Morton Stadium Dublin, Ireland (4,000 (800 Seated))
- Chairman: Conor Kelly
- Coach: Carl De Chenu
- Captain: TBC
- Competition: Euro XIII

The Dublin Blues were an Irish rugby league team from Dublin, Ireland.

== History ==
The Dublin Blues were Ireland's first ever rugby league club having been founded in 1989 by Brian Corrigan following a meeting with a delegation from the Rugby Football League which took place in 1988.

Initially the club played touring teams from the United Kingdom as there were no other teams in Ireland for a number of years. However, in 1995 the RFL financed a development programme in Ireland which would lead to the first domestic competition in 1997.

The Blues would become the inaugural champions of Ireland beating Tallaght Tigers in the 1997 Grand Final. They would go on to compete in the next two grand finals winning one and losing one.

Following their win in 1997 the Blues would become the first ever Irish team to enter into the Challenge Cup where they would be drawn away to Dewsbury Moors and would find themselves at the wrong end of a 32–7 score line.

Another foray into the Challenge Cup followed in 1999 this time the Blues would again come undone in the first round against Farnworth.

The Blues were a dominant force in the late 90's and early 00's in Irish rugby league in total they took part in 6 All Ireland Grand Finals winning 3 and also an Al Ireland Challenge Cup Final in 1998.

While the early 2000s bore fruit for Ireland's oldest team the Blues became weakened towards the end of the decade and in 2008 ceased to exist.

It seemed the once powerhouse of Irish Rugby League who produced Wigan Warriors legend Brian Carney would be resigned to the history books. However, 10 years after they ceased playing a plan was hatched to bring back the Blues.

The initial plan was to seek the funding to enter RFL League 1 and to give Irish players an opportunity to play semi-professional rugby league without the necessity to relocate to another country.

In 2020 the launch of the Euro XIII competition caught the working groups eyes and they successfully enter to participate in the 2021 competition. However this competition never took off and Dublin blues remains a memory.

== Honours ==
- Irish Elite League (2): 1997 & 1999

== See also ==
- List of sports clubs inspired by others
