= Rugby League Ireland =

Governing body for rugby league football on the island of Ireland

- Founded: 1988
- IRL affiliation: 2000
- ERL affiliation: 2003 (Full member)
- Responsibility: Ireland; Northern Ireland
- Headquarters: Dublin, Ireland
- Key people: Jim Reynolds (Chair)
- Competitions: RLI Premiership; RLI Women's Premiership
- Website: https://www.rli.ie/
- As of 30 July 2023

Rugby League Ireland (RLI) is the internationally recognised governing body for the development of rugby league football in Ireland, having secured official recognition from the RLIF in 2000. It is recognised within the Irish Sports Council and took over the running of the Irish international team entirely in 2008 for the World Cup. Prior to 2001 RLI was known as Ireland Rugby League.

In 2024, the body was downgraded to affiliate member due to non-compliance with the full membership criteria, in terms of domestic youth competition and registration systems.[6]

== Flag ==
Four Provinces Flag of Ireland

The Irish rugby league team draws its players from across the Island of Ireland. At the 2013 Rugby League World Cup, the Ireland team entered the field of play at the beginning of their matches with the Four Provinces Flag of Ireland.

== National team ==
The Ireland national rugby league team, known as the 'Wolfhounds', represents Ireland in rugby league football. The team is organised by Rugby League Ireland. The representative team is dominated by players from the Super League and sometimes includes players from the Australasian National Rugby League. Ireland is also represented by Ireland A, an amateur side which is made up of players from the domestic Irish competition.

Since Ireland began competing in international rugby league in 1995, it has participated in the 1995 Rugby League Emerging Nations Tournament, the 1996 Super League World Nines, and four Rugby League World Cups – 2000, 2008. 2013, and 2017. They have also competed in the Rugby League European Nations Cup and Victory Cup. Ireland A compete annually in the St Patrick's Day Challenge in the Amateur Four Nations.

== Competitions ==
As of 2025 Rugby League Ireland run two domestic club competitions:

- RLI Premiership (men's first tier)
- RLI Women's premiership (women's first tier)
