= Ireland national rugby league team =

Represents Ireland in international rugby league

Ireland

Team information
- Nickname: Wolfhounds
- Governing body: Rugby League Ireland
- Region: Europe
- Head coach: Ged Corcoran
- Captain: George King
- Most caps: Liam Finn (32)
- Top try-scorer: Stuart Littler (13)
- Top point-scorer: Liam Finn (170)
- Home stadium: Carlisle Grounds, Bray; Morton Stadium, Santry
- IRL ranking: 14th

Uniforms
First colours

Team results
- First international
- Ireland 24–22 United States (RFK Stadium, Washington, D.C., 17 March 1995)
- Biggest win
- Ireland 82–0 Serbia (Tullamore, Ireland; 18 October 2009)
- Biggest defeat
- England Knights 62–4 Ireland (St Helens, England;16 June 2012); Russia 64–6 Ireland (Moscow, Russia;16 May 2004)
- World Cup
- Appearances: 5 (first time in 2000)
- Best result: Quarterfinals (2000, 2008)

The Ireland men's national rugby league team, known as the Wolfhounds, is organised by Rugby League Ireland and represents the entire isle of Ireland in international rugby league. The representative team is composed largely of players of Irish descent who compete in the Super League as well as the Australasian National Rugby League. Ireland is also represented by an Ireland A side, which is made up of players from the Irish domestic competition.

Since Ireland began competing in international rugby league in 1995, it has participated in the 1995 Rugby League Emerging Nations Tournament, the 1996 Super League World Nines, and five Rugby League World Cups – 2000, 2008, 2013, 2017 and 2021. They have also competed in the Rugby League European Nations Cup.

Although, the island of Ireland is separate from the island of Great Britain, Irish players such as Cork-born Brian Carney have in the past been selected to play for the Great Britain side.

== History ==
The seeds of modern-day Rugby League in Ireland were sown in 1989 when Brian Corrigan founded the Dublin Blues Rugby League, a club that was primarily used by union players to keep fit during the summer by playing matches against touring British teams. In 1995 the British RFL established Ireland's first development officer and later that year Ireland played against the United States in Washington on St Patricks Day with Ireland winning 24–22. Wigan Warriors player Joe Lydon came on as a substitute despite also serving as the manager. Huddersfield Giants coach Terry Flanagan and former Great Britain Student international Niel Wood were the joint coaches. In August 1995 Ireland beat Scotland at the RDS Arena in Dublin as a curtain raiser to the charity shield match between Leeds Rhinos and Wigan Warriors. The matches were played before an attendance of 5,716, a record for an international rugby league match on Irish soil. Former Great Britain player Des Foy played for Ireland. Following their appearance at the 1995 Emerging Nations Tournament, they were invited to the Super League World Nines in Fiji where they finished 8th.

=== Flags and anthems ===
The Four Provinces Flag of Ireland

The Irish rugby league team is one of many Irish teams that draws its players from across the island of Ireland. It utilises the Four Provinces Flag of Ireland and the all-island anthem, "Ireland's Call". Unlike the Irish rugby union team, the Irish rugby league team neither plays Amhrán na bhFiann, the national anthem of the Irish state, nor God Save the King/Queen, the national anthem of Northern Ireland, in addition to Ireland's Call when playing at home.

=== 1995 Emerging Nations Tournament ===
Ireland were included in the tournament held in England and were placed in Group B alongside Moldova and Morocco. Ireland beat Moldova 48–24 before beating Morocco 42–6 to progress to the final. In the final Ireland lost 6–22 to the Cook Islands at Gigg Lane in Bury. Coached by Terry Flanagan, Ireland's squad included professionals Des Foy and Martin Crompton in an otherwise domestic based squad.

=== 2000 World Cup ===
1997 saw more England-based Super League players making themselves available by use of the grandparent rule. The Irish team improved its standards but this development gave less opportunity for Irish-based players to get a chance to play. However, Irish-based players were included in the Irish squad for the triangular tournaments in 1998 against France and Scotland and 1999 against Scotland and Wales. Their success was enough to earn a place in the 2000 World Cup. Finishing top of their group, the Irish eventually lost 26–16 to England in the quarter-finals, but the performance set the scene for future developments in Ireland.

=== 2008 World Cup ===
Ireland were drawn against Lebanon and Russia in Europe's 2008 Rugby League World Cup Qualifying Pool Two. Ireland topped the group with a 16–16 draw with Lebanon at Dewsbury on 2 November 2007. The draw meant Ireland qualified for the 2008 World Cup on points difference from Lebanon as both nations gained the same number of group points.

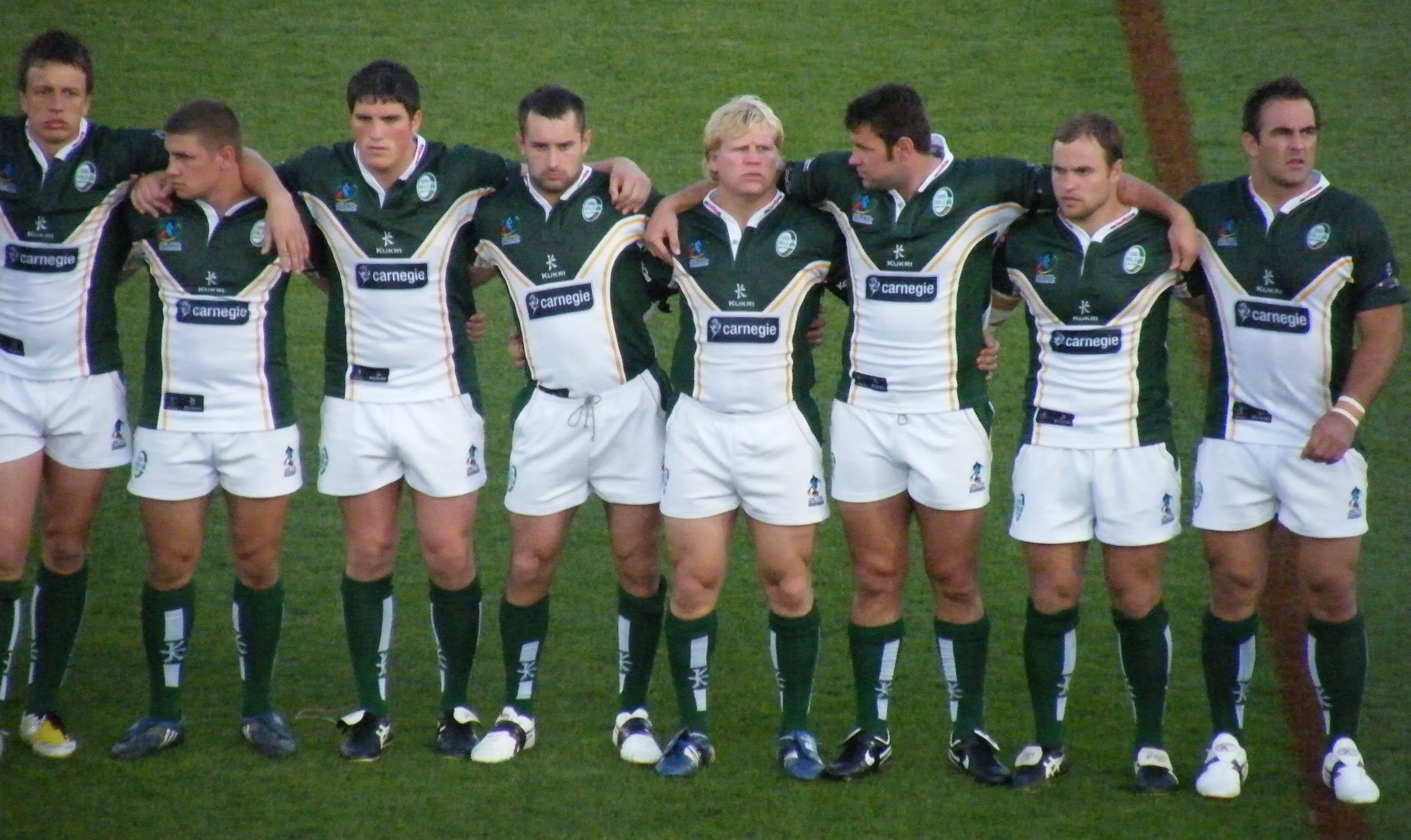
Ireland at the 2008 World Cup.

At the 2008 World Cup in Australia, Ireland were in Group C along with Tonga and Samoa. They lost to Tonga on 27 October in Parramatta, Sydney, but were victorious against Samoa, again in Parramatta, on 5 November and topped the group on points difference. As the group winners, they played Fiji, winners of Group B, for a chance to qualify for the semi-final. Fiji won 30–14 eliminating Ireland.

=== 2013 World Cup ===
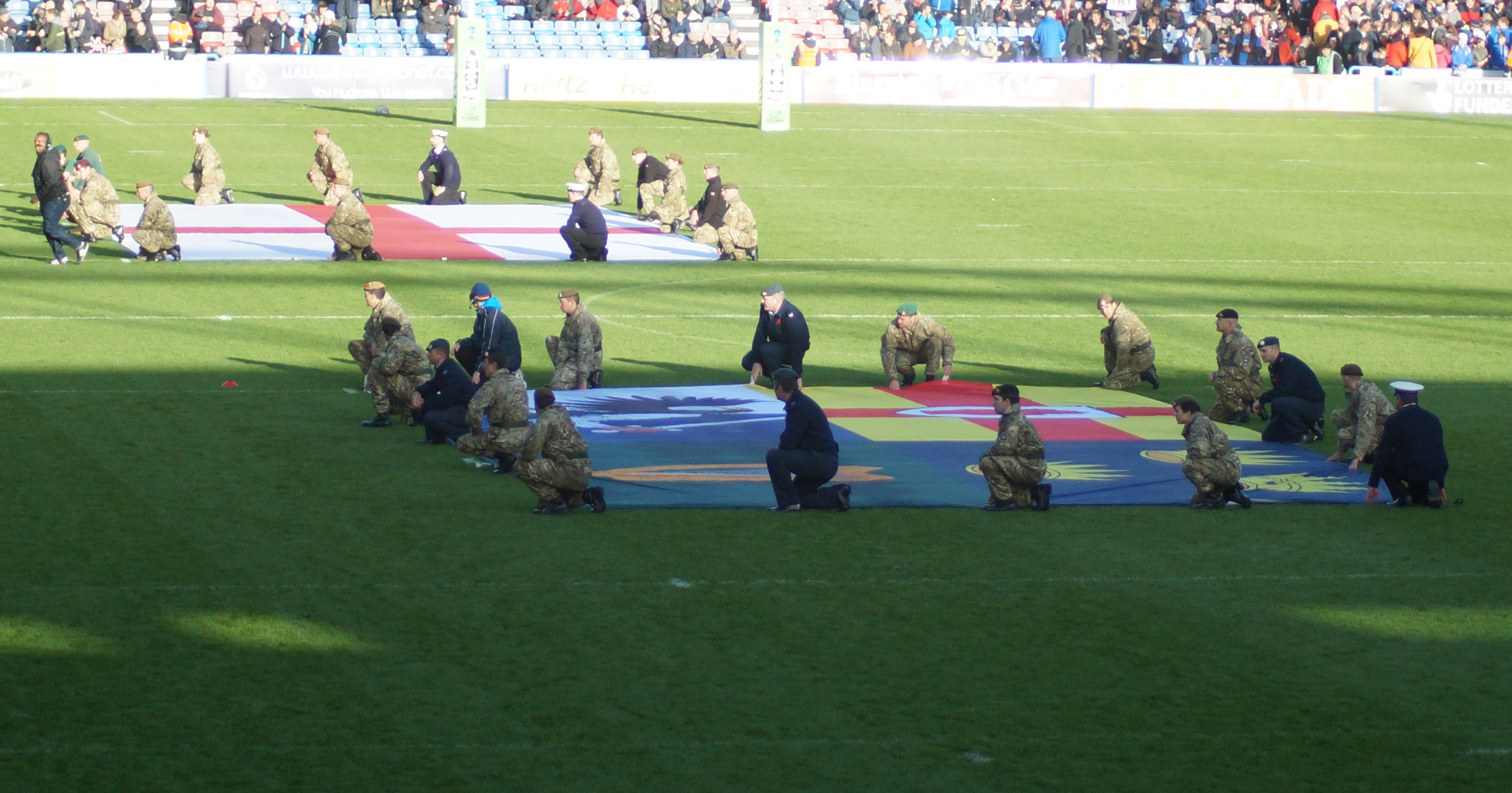
England v Ireland 2013 RLWC

For the 2013 World Cup Ireland were drawn in group A alongside Australia, England and 2008 World Cup rivals Fiji. Ireland was granted automatic entry to the tournament due to their strong showing in the 2008 World Cup. Ireland lost all three group matches including a 0–50 defeat to eventual champions Australia in front of 5,021 fans at Thomond Park.

=== 2017 World Cup ===
Ireland kicked off their campaign with a shock 36–12 win over Italy in Cairns. In the next pool match Ireland lost a narrow match to PNG 14–6 with PNG needing a 78th minute try to win the game. Ireland's final pool match was against Wales in Perth where they ran out comfortable winners 34–6. Ireland did not progress to the next round of the tournament despite winning more games than Lebanon or Samoa who qualified for the last 8.

=== 2021 World Cup ===
Ireland started 2021 Rugby League World Cup qualification campaign in the 2018 European Championship, where they finished third with a win against Scotland and two losses against France and Wales. Ireland's third-place finish required them to participate in the 2019 European play-off tournament to ensure qualification. Here they managed to achieve two wins against Italy and Spain, leading to their World Cup qualification. Ireland were drawn into Group C, alongside New Zealand, Lebanon and Jamaica. In April 2022 Offaly-born Ged Corcoran took over from Stuart Littler for the World Cup campaign. Ireland finished the tournament with a 1–2 record beating Jamaica in their opener, before losing to Lebanon and New Zealand.

=== Demotion to affiliate status and 2026 World Cup ineligibility ===
In March 2024, the International Rugby League deemed that Ireland had been non-compliant with the terms of the IRL membership policy and consequently would be reclassified as an affiliate member. This decision also made Ireland ineligible to participate in qualifiers for the 2026 Rugby League World Cup.

== Coaches ==
Updated as of 7 November 2026

| Name | Tenure | Matches | Won | Drawn | Lost | Win % | Championships/Notes |
|---|---|---|---|---|---|---|---|
| (England) Terry Flanagan | 1995–1996 | 6 | 4 | 0 | 2 | 66.67% | |
| (England) Steve O'Neill | 1997–2001* | 10 | 6 | 1 | 3 | 60% | Triangular Series |
| (England) Daryl Powell | 2003–2005 | 9 | 5 | 0 | 4 | 55.56% | |
| (England) Andy Kelly | 2006–2010 | 14 | 5 | 2 | 7 | 35.71% | |
| (England) Mark Aston | 2011–2017 | 20 | 8 | 0 | 12 | 40% | |
| (Ireland) Carl De Chenu† | July – September 2015; September – October 2016; June 2018 | 7 | 6 | 0 | 1 | 85.71% | |
| (Ireland) Stuart Littler | 2018–2022 | 5 | 3 | 0 | 2 | 60% | |
| (Ireland) Ged Corcoran | 2022– | 8 | 4 | 0 | 4 | 50% | |
| (Ireland) Wayne Kerr | September 2024; October 2025 | 2 | 2 | 0 | 0 | 100% | |
| Total | 1995– | 81 | 43 | 3 | 35 | 53.09% | —N/a |
^{*}Andy Kelly and Steve O'Neill were considered joint coaches during the 2000 World Cup and for Ireland's 2001 test with France.
^{†}Between 2015 and 2018 Carl De Chenu served as the domestic coach for test matches and assumed the role of assistant coach for the European Championships and World Cup.

== Current squad ==
The 28-man squad selected for the Autumn 2025 tests against Netherlands and Wales.

| Player | Club |
|---|---|
| Aaron Lynch | (England) Swinton Lions |
| Tom Ashurst | (England) Swinton Lions |
| Aidan McGowan | (England) Midlands Hurricanes |
| Connor Carr | (England) Huddersfield Giants |
| George King | (England) Huddersfield Giants |
| Harry Rushton | (England) Huddersfield Giants |
| Brendan O’Hagan | (Australia) Entrance Tigers |
| Daire Kemp | (Ireland) Longhorns RL |
| Dan Lynch | (England) Salford RLFC |
| Dec O’Donnell | (England) Wigan St Judes |
| Daniel Corcoran | (Australia) Canterbury-Bankstown Bulldogs |
| Isaac Baynham | (England) Leigh Leopards |
| Jack Brown | (England) York Knights |
| Jake Thewlis | (England) Warrington Wolves |
| Joe Philbin | (England) Warrington Wolves |
| Toby King | (England) Warrington Wolves |
| James Farrar | Ireland A Pathways |
| Lewis Wing | Ireland A Pathways |
| Jamie Gill | (England) Bradford Bulls |
| Ronan Michael | |
| Lachlan Lanskey | (England) Keighley Cougars |
| Oliver Whitford | (England) Keighley Cougars |
| Liam O’Callaghan | (England) Wests Warriors |
| Louix Gorman | (England) Hull KR |
| Lucas Castle | (England) Workington Town |
| Pat Moran | (England) Oldham Roughyeds |
| Ryan Hogg | (Ireland) Dublin City Exiles |
| Will Walker | (Ireland) Sherwood Wolf Hunt |

== Individual records ==
Statistics are up to date as of 30 October 2022. Bold indicates current player.

Most caps
| Rank | Name | Career | Caps | Tries | Position |
|---|---|---|---|---|---|
| 1 | Liam Finn | 2007–18 | **32** | 8 | SO |
| 2 | Bob Beswick | 2006–15 | **27** | 3 | HK |
| 3 | Scott Grix | 2006–18 | **22** | 8 | FB |
| 4 | Stuart Littler | 2004–16 | **21** | 13 | FB |
| 5 | Luke Ambler | 2009–16 | **20** | 6 | FW |

Most tries
| Rank | Name | Career | Caps | **Tries** | Position |
|---|---|---|---|---|---|
| 1 | Stuart Littler | 2004–16 | 21 | **13** | FB |
| 2 | Casey Dunne | 2014–18 | 13 | **12** | FB |
| 3 | Damien Blanch | 2006–13 | 9 | **9** | WG |
| 3 | Phil Cantillon | 2003–06 | 7 | **9** | HK |
| 3 | Karl Fitzpatrick | 2003–09 | 13 | **9** | FB |

Most points
| Rank | Name | Career | Caps | Tries | Points | Position |
|---|---|---|---|---|---|---|
| 1 | Liam Finn | 2007–18 | 32 | 8 | **170** | SO |
| 2 | James Kelly | 2015–16 | 7 | 5 | **64** | SO |
| 2 | Casey Dunne | 2014–18 | 13 | 12 | **64** | FB |
| 4 | Stuart Littler | 2004–16 | 21 | 13 | **54** | FB |
| 5 | Karl Fitzpatrick | 2003–09 | 13 | 9 | **46** | FB |

== Competitive records ==
Ireland compete in the Rugby League European Nations Cup and have participated in the Rugby League World Cup.

=== Head to head record ===
Ireland's competitive record as of 7 November 2026

| Against | Played | Won | Drawn | Lost | Win % | For | Aga | Diff |
|---|---|---|---|---|---|---|---|---|
| Australia | 1 | 0 | 0 | 1 | 0% | 0 | 50 | –50 |
| Belgium | 1 | 1 | 0 | 0 | 100% | 34 | 0 | +34 |
| Cook Islands | 1 | 0 | 0 | 1 | 0% | 6 | 22 | –16 |
| England | 3 | 0 | 0 | 3 | 0% | 28 | 104 | –76 |
| England Knights | 2 | 0 | 0 | 2 | 0% | 8 | 118 | –110 |
| Fiji | 2 | 0 | 0 | 2 | 0% | 28 | 62 | –34 |
| France | 9 | 1 | 1 | 7 | 11.11% | 172 | 295 | –123 |
| Hungary | 1 | 1 | 0 | 0 | 100% | 70 | 0 | +70 |
| Italy | 3 | 3 | 0 | 0 | 100% | 121 | 42 | +79 |
| Jamaica | 2 | 1 | 0 | 1 | 50% | 64 | 70 | –6 |
| Lebanon | 4 | 0 | 2 | 2 | 0% | 64 | 106 | –42 |
| Malta | 2 | 2 | 0 | 0 | 100% | 92 | 32 | +60 |
| Moldova | 1 | 1 | 0 | 0 | 100% | 48 | 26 | +22 |
| Morocco | 1 | 1 | 0 | 0 | 100% | 42 | 6 | +36 |
| New Zealand | 1 | 0 | 0 | 1 | 0% | 10 | 48 | –38 |
| Māori | 1 | 1 | 0 | 0 | 100% | 30 | 16 | +14 |
| Netherlands | 2 | 2 | 0 | 0 | 100% | 60 | 28 | +32 |
| Papua New Guinea | 1 | 0 | 0 | 1 | 0% | 6 | 14 | –8 |
| Russia | 4 | 3 | 0 | 1 | 75% | 184 | 110 | +74 |
| Samoa | 2 | 2 | 0 | 0 | 100% | 64 | 32 | +32 |
| Scotland | 16 | 12 | 0 | 4 | 75% | 379 | 273 | +106 |
| Serbia | 2 | 2 | 0 | 0 | 100% | 106 | 16 | +90 |
| Spain | 2 | 2 | 0 | 0 | 100% | 88 | 14 | +74 |
| Tonga | 1 | 0 | 0 | 1 | 0% | 20 | 22 | –2 |
| United States | 3 | 3 | 0 | 0 | 100% | 112 | 50 | +62 |
| Wales | 13 | 5 | 0 | 8 | 38.46% | 241 | 313 | –72 |
| Total | 81 | 43 | 3 | 35 | 53.09% | 2,077 | 1,869 | +208 |

== Tournament Records and IRL Rankings ==
IRL Men's World Rankings
Official rankings as of August 2026
| Rank | Change | Team | Pts % |
| 1 | Steady | Australia | 100 |
| 2 | Steady | New Zealand | 82 |
| 3 | Steady | England | 70 |
| 4 | Steady | Samoa | 56 |
| 5 | Steady | Tonga | 54 |
| 6 | Steady | Papua New Guinea | 47 |
| 7 | Steady | Fiji | 34 |
| 8 | ▲1 | Cook Islands | 24 |
| 9 | ▲2 | Netherlands | 23 |
| 10 | ▲2 | Ukraine | 21 |
| 11 | ▼3 | France | 21 |
| 12 | ▼2 | Serbia | 20 |
| 13 | Steady | Wales | 18 |
| 14 | Steady | Ireland | 17 |
| 15 | Steady | Greece | 14 |
| 16 | Steady | Malta | 14 |
| 17 | ▲12 | Canada | 13 |
| 18 | ▼1 | Italy | 11 |
| 19 | ▼1 | Jamaica | 9 |
| 20 | ▲7 | Scotland | 8 |
| 21 | ▲1 | United States | 8 |
| 22 | ▼3 | Poland | 7 |
| 23 | ▼3 | Lebanon | 7 |
| 24 | ▼1 | Germany | 7 |
| 25 | ▼1 | Czech Republic | 6 |
| 26 | ▼5 | Norway | 6 |
| 27 | ▼2 | Chile | 5 |
| 28 | ▲2 | Philippines | 5 |
| 29 | ▼1 | South Africa | 4 |
| 30 | Steady | Brazil | 3 |
| 31 | Steady | Morocco | 3 |
| 32 | ▲1 | Argentina | 3 |
| 33 | ▲2 | Ghana | 2 |
| 34 | ▲2 | Kenya | 2 |
| 35 | ▼1 | Montenegro | 2 |
| 36 | ▲1 | Nigeria | 2 |
| 37 | ▼5 | North Macedonia | 1 |
| 38 | Steady | Albania | 1 |
| 39 | Steady | Turkey | 1 |
| 40 | Steady | Bulgaria | 1 |
| 41 | Steady | Cameroon | 0 |
| 42 | Steady | Japan | 0 |
| 43 | Steady | Spain | 0 |
| 44 | Steady | Colombia | 0 |
| 45 | Steady | Russia | 0 |
| 46 | Steady | El Salvador | 0 |
| 47 | Steady | Bosnia and Herzegovina | 0 |
| 48 | Steady | Hong Kong | 0 |
| 49 | Steady | Solomon Islands | 0 |
| 50 | Steady | Vanuatu | 0 |
| 51 | Steady | Hungary | 0 |
| 52 | Steady | Latvia | 0 |
| 53 | Steady | Denmark | 0 |
| 54 | Steady | Belgium | 0 |
| 55 | Steady | Estonia | 0 |
| 56 | Steady | Sweden | 0 |
| 57 | Steady | Niue | 0 |
Complete rankings at www.internationalrugbyleague.com

=== World Cup ===
| World Cup Record | | | | | | | | | World Cup qualification record | | | | | |
| Year | Round | Position | P | W | D | L | F | A | Pld | W | D | L | PF | PA |
|---|---|---|---|---|---|---|---|---|---|---|---|---|---|---|
| (France) 1954 | Did not enter | | | | | | | | Did not enter | | | | | |
| (Australia) 1957 | Did not enter | | | | | | | | Did not enter | | | | | |
| (England) 1960 | Did not enter | | | | | | | | Did not enter | | | | | |
| (Australia) (New Zealand) 1968 | Did not enter | | | | | | | | Did not enter | | | | | |
| (England) 1970 | Did not enter | | | | | | | | Did not enter | | | | | |
| (France) 1972 | Did not enter | | | | | | | | Did not enter | | | | | |
| 1975 | Did not enter | | | | | | | | Did not enter | | | | | |
| (Australia) (New Zealand) 1977 | Did not enter | | | | | | | | Did not enter | | | | | |
| 1985–88 | Did not enter | | | | | | | | Did not enter | | | | | |
| 1989–92 | Did not enter | | | | | | | | Did not enter | | | | | |
| (England) 1995 | Did not enter | | | | | | | | Did not enter | | | | | |
| (England) (Ireland) (France) (Scotland) (Wales) 2000 | Quarter-finals | Fifth place | 4 | 3 | 0 | 1 | 94 | 64 | Qualified as co-hosts | | | | | |
| (Australia) 2008 | Semi-final qualifier | Fifth place | 3 | 1 | 0 | 2 | 68 | 68 | 4 | 2 | 2 | 0 | 142 | 64 |
| (England) (Wales) 2013 | Group stage | 14th | 3 | 0 | 0 | 3 | 14 | 124 | Automatic qualifier | | | | | |
| (Australia) (New Zealand) (Papua New Guinea) 2017 | Group stage | 9th | 3 | 2 | 0 | 1 | 76 | 32 | 2 | 2 | 0 | 0 | 116 | 22 |
| (England) 2021 | Group stage | 9th | 3 | 1 | 0 | 2 | 72 | 82 | 2 | 2 | 0 | 0 | 67 | 12 |
| (Australia) 2026 | Ineligible to participate in qualifiers | | | | | | | | Ineligible to participate in qualifiers | | | | | |
| Total | 5/16 | Fifth place | 16 | 7 | 0 | 9 | 324 | 370 | 8 | 6 | 2 | 0 | 325 | 98 |

A red box around the year indicates tournaments played within Ireland.

=== European Championship ===
European Championship record
| Year | Round | Position | GP | W | L | D |
|---|---|---|---|---|---|---|
| 1935–1996 | did not enter | | | | | |
| 2003 | Group Stage | 3/3 | 2 | 1 | 1 | 0 |
| 2004 | Second Place | 2/6 | 3 | 2 | 1 | 0 |
| 2005 | Group Stage | 2/3 | 2 | 1 | 1 | 0 |
| 2009 | Fourth Place | 4/6 | 3 | 1 | 2 | 0 |
| 2010 | Fourth Place | 4/4 | 3 | 0 | 3 | 0 |
| 2012 | Second Place | 2/3 | 2 | 1 | 1 | 0 |
| 2014 | Third Place | 3/4 | 3 | 2 | 1 | 0 |
| 2015 | Third Place | 3/4 | 3 | 1 | 2 | 0 |
| 2018 | Third Place | 3/4 | 3 | 1 | 2 | 0 |
| Total | 0 Titles | 9/33 | 24 | 10 | 14 | 0 |

=== Celtic Cup ===
Celtic Cup Record
| Year | Round | Position | GP | W | L | D |
|---|---|---|---|---|---|---|
| 2026 | Group Stage | 2/3 | 2 | 1 | 1 | 0 |
| Total | 0 Titles | —N/a | 2 | 1 | 1 | 0 |

=== Triangular Series ===
This one-off tournament was contested by Ireland, Scotland and Wales.

Triangular Series Record
| Year | Round | Position | GP | W | L | D |
|---|---|---|---|---|---|---|
| 1999 | 1st Place | 1/3 | 2 | 2 | 0 | 0 |
| Total | 1 Title | —N/a | 2 | 2 | 0 | 0 |

=== Emerging Nations Tournament ===
Ireland competed in one of the two Emerging Nations Tournaments reaching the final the inaugural event.

Emerging Nations Tournament
| Year | Round | Position | GP | W | L | D |
|---|---|---|---|---|---|---|
| 1995 | 2nd Place | 2/7 | 3 | 2 | 1 | 0 |
| Total | 0 Titles | —N/a | 3 | 2 | 1 | 0 |

== Honours ==
- 1999 Triangular Series

== Stadium and attendances ==
In 2015 Rugby League Ireland announced that the Carlisle Grounds in Bray, County Wicklow would become the official home ground of the national team. Despite this announcement, Ireland have also subsequently used Morton Stadium in Santry as their home ground.

Below is a list of the highest attendances for international rugby league matches in Ireland.

| Rank | Attendance | Opponent | Date | Venue | Metro area |
|---|---|---|---|---|---|
| 1 | 5,716 | Scotland | 1995-08-13 | RDS Arena | Dublin |
| 2 | 5,021 | Australia | 2013-11-09 | Thomond Park | Limerick |
| 3 | 3,207 | Samoa | 2000-10-28 | Windsor Park | Belfast |
| 4 | 3,164 | New Zealand Maori | 2000-11-04 | Tolka Park | Dublin |
| 5 | 3,100 | France | 2011-11-05 | Thomond Park | Limerick |

== Ireland A ==
Ireland Wolfhounds logo

The Ireland A team is selected from players in the Irish domestic competition, administered by Rugby League Ireland. The Ireland A side competed in the St Patrick's Day Challenge between 2000 and 2012 and in the Amateur Four Nations from 2003 to 2014.

== See also ==
- Rugby league in Ireland
- Rugby League European Nations Cup
- Rugby League Emerging Nations Tournament
- Rugby League World Cup
- Rugby League Ireland
- List of Ireland national rugby league team players
- Ireland national rugby union team
