= Hayne–Mannah Cup =

2014 Hayne–Mannah Cup
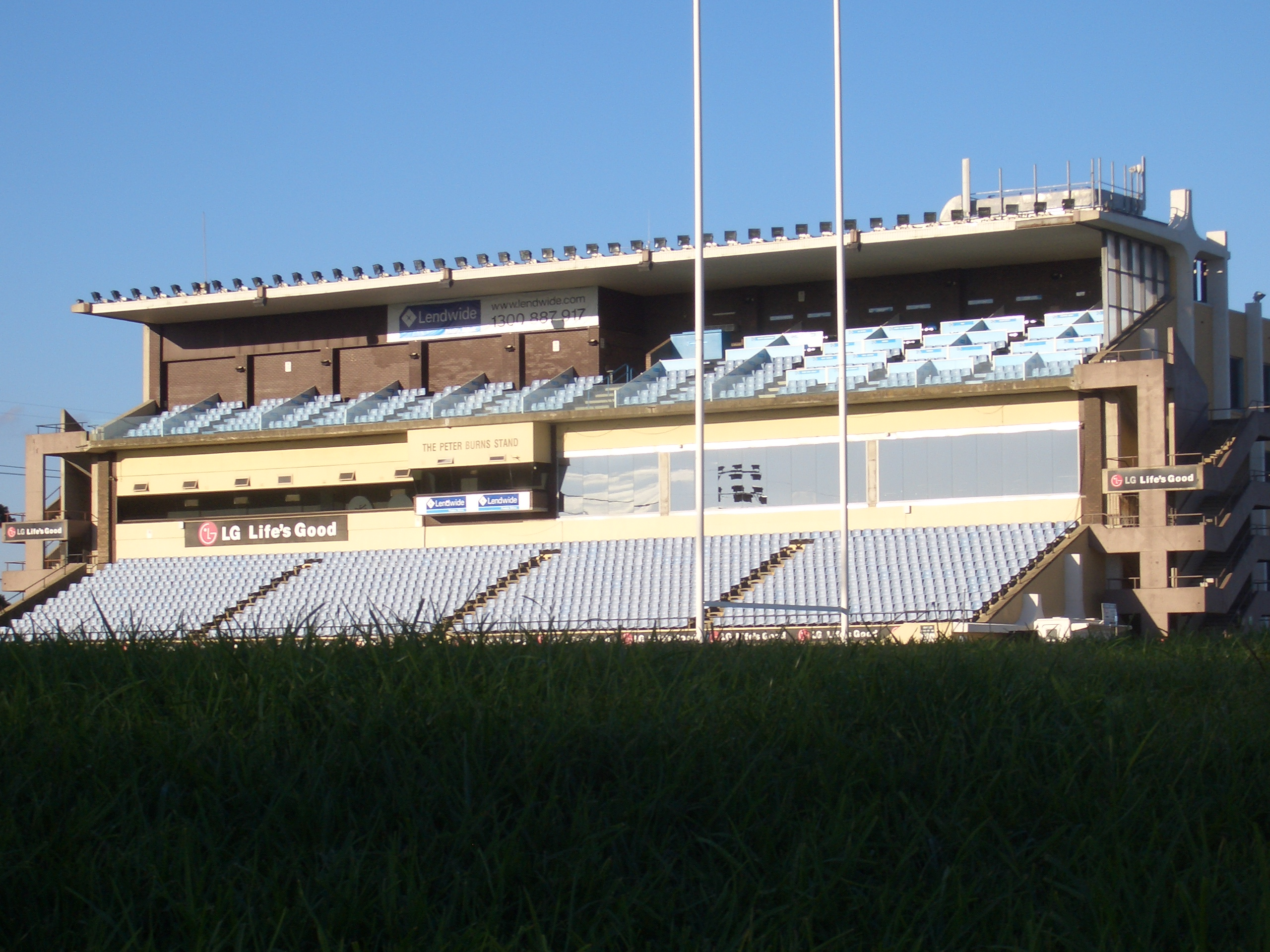
- Remondis Stadium hosted the match
Fiji	Lebanon
(FNRL)	(LRLF)
40	28
	1	2	Total
FIJ	22	18	40
LEB	12	16	28
- Date: 19 October 2014
- Stadium: Remondis Stadium
- Location: Sydney, Australia
- Man of the Match: James Storer (Fiji)
- Referee: Gerard Sutton (Australia)

Broadcast partners

The Hayne–Mannah Cup was a rugby league test match played between Fiji and Lebanon on Sunday, 19 October 2014.

== Background ==
The fixture was in honour of Parramatta Eels players, Jarryd Hayne and Tim Mannah, who both have Fijian and Lebanese heritage respectively. Fiji won the test match by 40–28 after leading 22–12 at half-time. Fiji's James Storer won the man of the match award, scoring one try in the match.

== Squads ==
=== Fiji ===
- Coach: (Australia) Rick Stone

Club Team	Players
(Australia) St George Illawarra Dragons	Sitiveni Moceidreke
(Fiji) FNRL	Sisa Balkcolo, Josaia Maiveleko, Joseva Vetaukula, Nero Senimoli, Isoa Qionacawa
(Australia) Illawarra Cutters	Alipate Tani, Peni Botiki
(Australia) Penrith Panthers	Wes Naiqama, Reagan Campbell-Gillard
(England) Rochdale Hornets	Ryan Millard
(Australia) Asquith Magpies	Aaron Groom
(Australia) Collegians	James Storer
(Australia) Cronulla Sharks	Junior Roqica
(Australia) Redcliffe Dolphins	Sarafu Fatiaki
(Australia) Parramatta Eels	Fabian Goodall
(Australia) Wyong Roos	Eloni Vunakece
(Australia) Sydney Roosters	Jokatama Dokonivalu
(Australia) Manly Sea Eagles	Evan Lee

=== Lebanon ===
- Coach: (Lebanon) Darren Maroon

Club Team	Players
(Australia) Mascot Juniors	Eddy Elzbaidieh
(Australia) Cronulla Sharks	Ben Chahoud
(Australia) North Sydney Bears	Tarek El Masri
(Australia) Newtown Jets	Raymond Moujalli
(Australia) Lithgow Workmen's Club	Jamie Clark
(Australia) Wentworthville Magpies	Elias Sukkar, Ahmad Ellaz, Nick Kassis, Danny Barakat
(Australia) Guildford Owls	Chris Saab
(Australia) Parramatta Eels	Mark Daoud
(Australia) Kingsgrove Colts	Abbas Miski
(Australia) Newcastle Knights	James Elias
(Australia) Penrith Panthers	Travis Robinson
(Australia) Auburn Warriors	Cliff Nye
(Australia) Canberra Raiders	Reece Robinson, Jamal Nchouk
(Australia) Eastern Suburbs	Mitchell Mamary
(Australia) Blacktown Workers	Jad Mahmoud

== Match details ==
Hayne–Mannah Cup

19 October 2014
15:00 AEST (UTC+10)

Fiji	40 – 28	Lebanon
Tries: W. Naiqama 2 Storer 2 Fatiaki 1 Goodall 1 K. Sims 1 Goals: W. Naiqama 6/7	Report; Summary	Tries: 1 Daoud; 1 A. Elzbaidieh; 1 E. Elzbaidieh; 1 Kassis; 1 Miski; Goals: 4/5 Miski

Remondis Stadium, Woolooware
Referee: Gerard Sutton (Australia)
Player of the Match: James Storer (Fiji)

FB	1	Sitiveni Moceidreke
RW	2	Fabian Goodall
RC	3	Alipate Noilea
LC	4	Wes Naiqama (c)
LW	5	Joe Rokoqo
FE	6	Ryan Millard
HB	7	Aaron Groom
PR	8	Reagan Campbell-Gillard
HK	9	James Storer
PR	10	Junior Roqica
SR	11	Sarafu Fatiaki
SR	12	Korbin Sims
LF	13	Eloni Vunakece
Substitutions:
IC	14	Nero Senimoli
IC	15	Apisai Koroisau
IC	16	Jokatama Dokonivalu
IC	17	Peni Botiki
Coach:
(Australia) Rick Stone

FB	1	Clifton Nye
RW	2	Eddy El Zbaidieh
RC	3	Danny Barakat
LC	4	James Elias
LW	5	Adballah El Zbaidieh
FE	6	Mark Daoud
HB	7	Abbas Miski
PR	8	Elias Sukkar
HK	9	Jamie Clark
PR	10	Ray Moujalli
SR	11	Chris Saab (c)
SR	12	Ahmad Ellaz
LK	13	Nick Kassis
Substitutions:
IC	14	Jamal Nchouki
IC	15	Tarek El Masri
IC	16	Mitchell Mamary
IC	17	Ben Chahoud
Coach:
(Lebanon) Darren Maroon
