= 2017 Rugby League World Cup qualification (Middle East-Africa play-off) =

2017 RLWC qualification (Middle East-Africa play-off)
South Africa	Lebanon
28	90
- On aggregate (Lebanon wins series 2–0)

First test
South Africa	Lebanon
12	40
- Date: 25 October 2015
- Venue: Bosman Stadium, Brakpan
- Man of the Match: Elias Sukkar (Lebanon)
- Referee: Phil Bentham (England)

Second test
Lebanon	South Africa
50	16
- Date: 31 October 2015
- Venue: Bosman Stadium, Brakpan
- Man of the Match: Elias Sukkar (Lebanon)
- Referee: Phil Bentham (England)

The 2017 Rugby League World Cup Middle East-Africa qualification play-off was a two-match rugby league series, with the winner qualifying for the 2017 Rugby League World Cup. The matches were between South Africa and Lebanon and were played at Brakpan Stadium in Pretoria, South Africa on 25 and 31 October 2015.

== Overview ==
On 3 October 2014, the 2017 Rugby League World Cup qualifying competition was announced with one qualification spot being granted to the Middle East-Africa region.

Initially a one-off play off match in the Dubai Sports City complex was announced. However the match was cancelled after the head of the Emirates rugby league, Sol Mokdad, was arrested following a complaint from UAE rugby union officials.

South Africa was subsequently given the hosting rights for the qualification fixtures. South Africa RL president Kobus Botha stated that the "SARL is extremely excited about hosting this highly prestigious World Cup Qualifier... We hope that this is the first of many such tournaments and a small glimpse into what South Africa can offer as a potential host country for the 2021 World Cup."

== Squads ==
Both teams picked preliminary train-on squads with the South Africans picked what they believed was "a strong, healthy and balanced train-on squad" which contained domestic players as well as eligible South African players based in Australia's reserve grade competitions. The Lebanese selected eligible NRL players along with other reserve grade, domestic and unattached players.

=== South Africa ===
The South Africa squad as of 13 October 2015 was as follows:

- Coach: (Australia) Brian Greige

Club Team	Players
(South Africa) Barberton Bulldogs	Jaice Terblanche
(Australia) Burleigh Bears	Shane Gillham
(South Africa) Cape Town Hyenas	Shuab Samaai
(Australia) Emerald Tigers	Jason King
(South Africa) Harlequins Rugby League Club	Deon Kraemer, Jean Coetzer, Jean-Pierre Nel
(South Africa) Northern Bulls	Marcell Viljoen, Rudolph Prinsloo, Theo Rhodes
(South Africa) UP-Tuks RLC	Christo Louw, Dwayne Botma, Johan Joubert, Nardus Raubenheimer, Ruaan Du Preez, Rupert Wells
(Australia) Wentworthville Magpies	Louis Musson
(Australia) West Coast Pirates	Bradley Williams, Halvor Harris
(Australia) Wynnum Manly Seagulls	Gideon Mzembe

=== Lebanon ===
The Lebanon squad as of 17 October 2015 was as follows:

- Coach: (Australia) Darren Maroon

Club Team	Players
(Lebanon) AUB	Toufic El Hajj
(Australia) Asquith Magpies	Mark Daoud
(Australia) Auburn Warriors	Jamie Clark, Richard Coorey, Ead Kassem, Elias Sukkar
(Australia) Guildford Owls	Chris Saab
(Australia) Hills	James Boustani
(Lebanon) Immortals RLFC	Ray Finan, Robin Hachache
(Australia) Melbourne Storm	Travis Robinson
(Australia) Newcastle Knights	James Elias
(Australia) Newtown Jets	Daniel Abou Sleiman, Ahmad Ellaz, Tarek El Masri, Ray Moujalli
(Australia) Wentworthville Magpies	Nick Kassis, Mitchell Mamary
(Lebanon) Wolves RLFC	Wael Harb
Unattached	Adham El Zbaidieh

== First test ==
25 October 2015

South Africa	12 – 40	Lebanon
Try: Joubert 12'; King 56'; Raubenheimer 73'; Goal: Williams (0/2); Coetzer (0/1)	Report	Try: Robinson (3) 3' c, 33', 78' c Saab 17' c Abou-Sleiman 21' c Mamary 59' c El Masri 63' c Goal: Boustani (6/7) 4', 18', 22', 60', 64', 79'

Bosman Stadium, Brakpan
Referee: (England) Phil Bentham
Player of the Match: Elias Sukkar (Lebanon)

FB	1	Jason King
RW	2	Gideon Mzembe
RC	3	Johan Joubert
LC	4	Jean Coetzer
LW	5	Shuab Samaai
SO	6	Theo Rhodes
SH	7	Bradley Williams
PR	8	Jaice Terblanche
HK	9	Marcell Viljoen
PR	10	Louis Musson
SR	11	Dwayne Botma
SR	12	Halvor Harris
LF	13	Shane Gillham
Substitutions:
IC	14	Nardus Raubenheimer
IC	15	Rupert Wells
IC	16	Rudolph Prinsloo
IC	17	Jean-Pierre Nel
Coach:
Brian Greige

FB	1	Daniel Abou Sleiman
RW	2	Adham El Zbaidieh
RC	3	Tarek El Masri
LC	4	Chris Saab
LW	5	Travis Robinson
FE	6	Mark Daoud
HB	7	James Boustani
PR	8	Mitchell Mamary
HK	9	Ali Allouche
PR	10	Ray Moujalli
SR	11	Elias Sukkar
SR	12	Nick Kassis
LK	13	Ahmad Ellaz
Substitutions:
IC	14	Richard Coorey
IC	15	James Elias
IC	16	Wael Harb
IC	17	Robin Hachache
Coach:
Darren Maroon

Notes:

- Ali Allouche was a late replacement for suspended hooker Jamie Clark.

== Second test ==
31 October 2015

South Africa	16 – 50	Lebanon
Try: Mzembe 36'; Wells 54'; Viljoen 76'; Goal: Williams (2/3)	Report	Try: Abou Sleiman 2'; Robinson (3) 11', 19', 44'; Daoud 26'; Sukkar 32'; El Masri 60'; Boustani 63'; Kassis 74'; Goal: Boustani (7/10)

Bosman Stadium, Brakpan
Referee: (England) Phil Bentham
Player of the Match: Elias Sukkar (Lebanon)

FB	1	Jason King
RW	2	Gideon Mzembe
RC	3	Johan Joubert
LC	4	Jean Coetzer
LW	5	Rupert Wells
SO	6	Theo Rhodes
SH	7	Bradley Williams
PR	8	Jaice Terblanche
HK	9	Marcell Viljoen
PR	10	Rudolph Prinsloo
SR	11	Dwayne Botma
SR	12	Halvor Harris
LF	13	Shane Gillham
Substitutions:
IC	14	Shuab Samaai
IC	15	Louis Musson
IC	16	Deon Kraemer
IC	17	Christo Louw
Coach:
Brian Greige

FB	1	Daniel Abou Sleiman
RW	2	Adham El Zbaidieh
RC	3	Tarek El Masri
LC	4	Chris Saab
LW	5	Travis Robinson
FE	6	Mark Daoud
HB	7	James Boustani
PR	8	Mitchell Mamary
HK	9	Ali Allouche
IC	10	Richard Coorey
SR	11	Elias Sukkar
SR	12	Nick Kassis
LK	13	Ahmad Ellaz
Substitutions:
IC	14	James Elias
IC	15	Wael Harb
IC	16	Robin Hachache
IC	17	Ead Kassem
Coach:
Darren Maroon

Notes:

- With the win, Lebanon qualified for the 2017 World Cup after a 2–0 series victory.
