= Ahmad Ellaz =

Lebanon international rugby league footballer

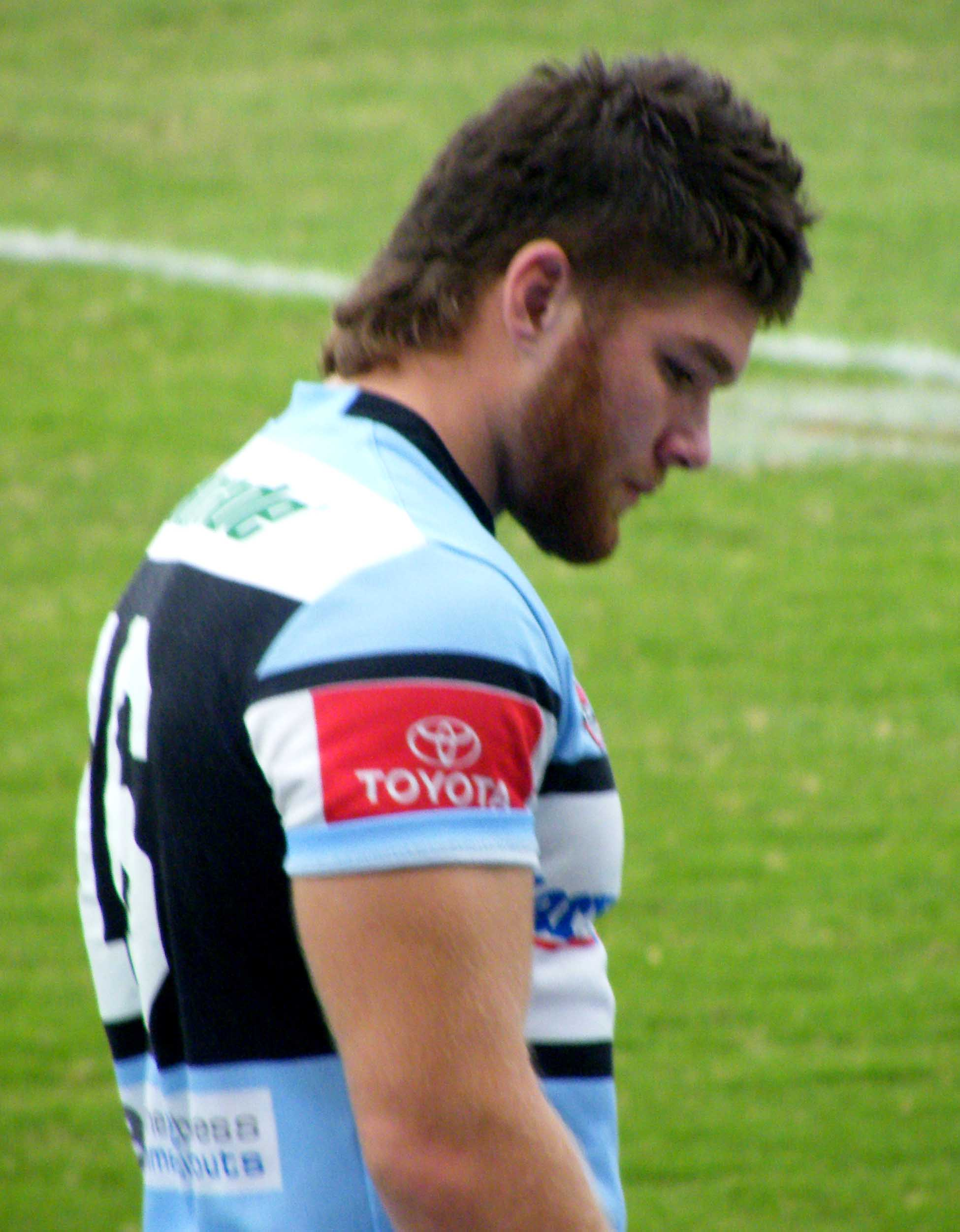
- Ellaz playing for Cronulla in 2009

Personal information
- Born: 14 May 1990 (age 35)
- Height: 180 cm (5 ft 11 in)
- Weight: 98 kg (15 st 6 lb)

Playing information
- Position: Second-row, Lock
Representative
Years	Team	Pld	T	G	FG	P
2009–17	Lebanon	10	1	0	0	4

Ahmad Ellaz (born 14 May 1990) is a Lebanese rugby league player who has represented his country. His position is usually in the back row.

== Playing career ==
Ellaz has represented Lebanon at the 2009 European Cup, during qualification for the 2013 World Cup, in the 2014 Hayne/Mannah Cup and during qualification for the 2017 World Cup.

Ellaz joined Newtown in 2011 and quickly cemented his position at lock. He won the award for the Most Consistent Player at the 2011 Newtown RLFC Presentation Night. At the end of the year he was named as a member of New South Wales Cup Team of the Year. In 2017, Ellaz played for the Auburn Warriors in the Ron Massey Cup competition.

Date	Opponents	Competition	T	G	FG	Pts	Ref
24 October 2009	Italy	2009 European Cup	1	0	0	4	
1 November 2009	Scotland	2009 European Cup	0	0	0	0	
8 November 2009	Ireland	2009 European Cup	0	0	0	0	
16 October 2011	Serbia	2013 World Cup qualifiers	0	0	0	0	
29 October 2011	Italy	2013 World Cup qualifiers	0	0	0	0	
19 October 2014	Fiji	2014 Hayne/Mannah Cup	0	0	0	0	
25 October 2015	South Africa	2017 World Cup qualifiers	0	0	0	0	
31 October 2015	South Africa	2017 World Cup qualifiers	0	0	0	0	
8 May 2016	Cook Islands		0	0	0	0	
6 May 2017	Malta	2017 Phoenician Cup	0	0	0	0	
