= Nick Kassis =

Lebanon international rugby league player

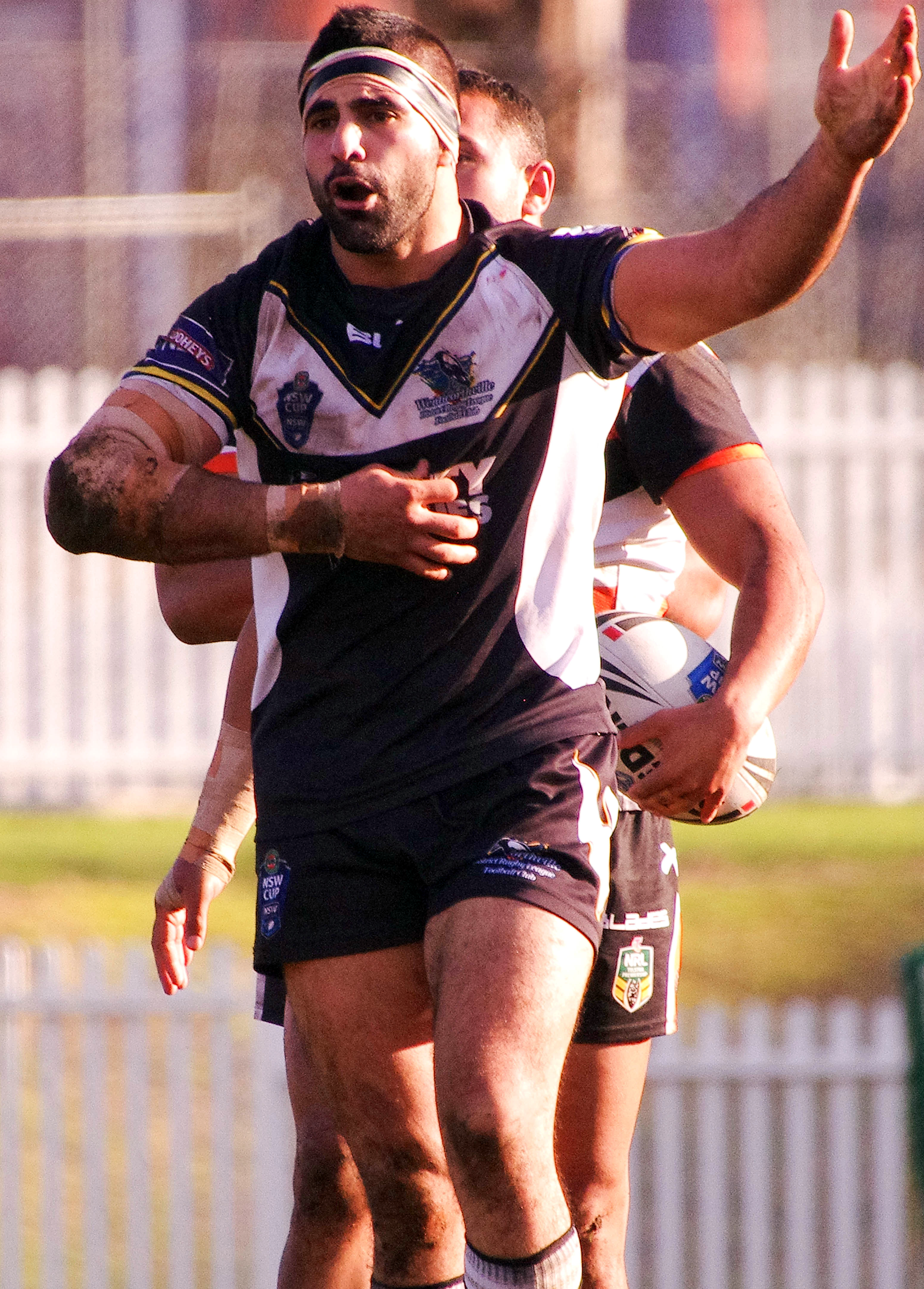

Personal information
- Born: 29 November 1988 (age 37) Australia
- Height: 187 cm (6 ft 2 in)
- Weight: 103 kg (227 lb; 16 st 3 lb)

Playing information
- Position: Second-row, Lock
Representative
Years	Team	Pld	T	G	FG	P
2009–17	Lebanon	14	7	0	0	28
- Source: As of 4 November 2017

Nicholas Kassis (born 29 November 1988) is a Lebanon international rugby league footballer who plays for the Wentworthville Magpies in the Ron Massey Cup competition. Primarily playing at second-row or lock, Kassis has represented the Lebanese national team, most notably at the 2017 World Cup.

== Playing career ==
Kassis scored two tries for the Wentworthville Magpies in their 38–4 victory over the Auburn Warriors in the 2017 Ron Massey Cup grand final.

Kassis played from the interchange bench for Wentworthville in their 2019 Ron Massey Cup grand final victory over St Mary's at Leichhardt Oval.

International caps
Cap	Date	Venue	Opponent	Competition	T	G	FG	Points
1	1 November 2009	Hughenden Stadium, Glasgow	Scotland	2009 European Cup	1	0	0	4
2	8 November 2009	Brewery Field, Bridgend	Ireland	2009 European Cup	0	0	0	0
3	16 October 2011	International Olympic Stadium, Tripoli	Serbia	2013 World Cup qualifiers	1	0	0	4
4	22 October 2011	Vereya Stadium, Vereya	Russia	2013 World Cup qualifiers	1	0	0	4
5	29 October 2011	Makiš Stadium, Belgrade	Italy	2013 World Cup qualifiers	0	0	0	0
6	7 October 2012	The Crest Stadium, Sydney	Cook Islands		0	0	0	0
7	19 October 2014	Endeavour Field, Sydney	Fiji	2014 Hayne/Mannah Cup	1	0	0	4
8	3 May 2015	St Marys Leagues Stadium, Sydney	Malta		0	0	0	0
9	25 October 2015	Bosman Stadium, Pretoria	South Africa	2017 World Cup qualifiers	0	0	0	0
10	31 October 2015	Bosman Stadium, Pretoria	South Africa	2017 World Cup qualifiers	1	0	0	4
11	8 May 2016	Belmore Sports Ground, Sydney	Cook Islands		1	0	0	4
12	6 May 2017	Cabramatta Leagues Stadium, Sydney	Malta		0	0	0	0
13	29 October 2017	Canberra Stadium, Canberra	France	2017 World Cup	0	0	0	0
14	3 November 2017	Sydney Football Stadium, Sydney	England	2017 World Cup	1	0	0	4
