= Elias Sukkar =

Lebanon international rugby league footballer

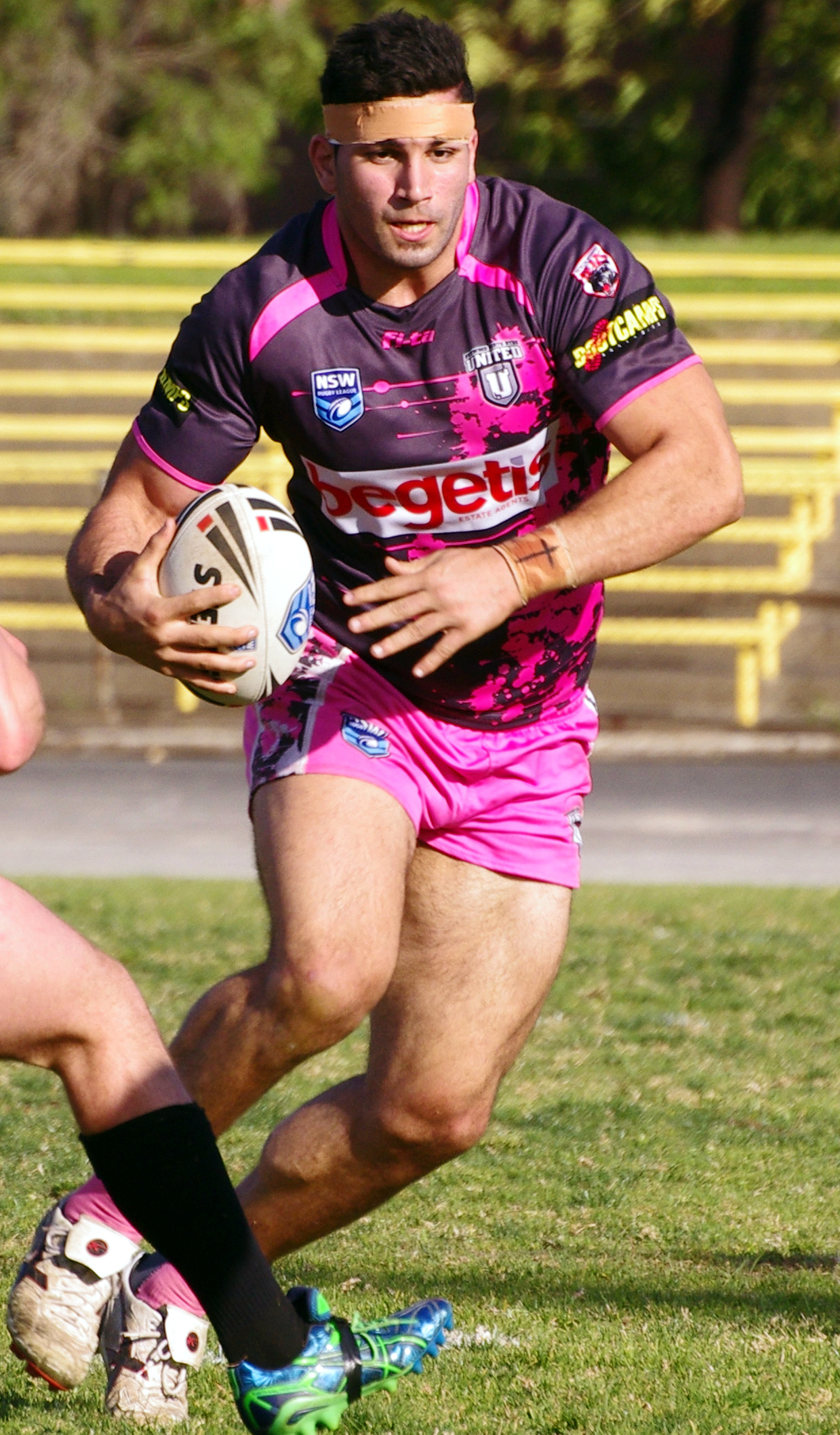

Personal information
- Born: 26 May 1991 (age 35)
- Height: 190 cm (6 ft 3 in)
- Weight: 110 kg (243 lb; 17 st 5 lb)

Playing information
- Position: Prop
Representative
Years	Team	Pld	T	G	FG	P
2012–17	Lebanon	6	2	0	0	8
- Source: As of 29 October 2017

Elias Sukkar is a Lebanon international rugby league footballer who plays as a prop for the Auburn Warriors. He was selected to represent Lebanon in the 2017 Rugby League World Cup.

== Representative career ==
Date	Opponents	Competition	T	G	FG	Pts	Ref
7 October 2012	Cook Islands		1	0	0	4	
19 October 2014	Fiji	2014 Hayne/Mannah Cup	0	0	0	0	
3 May 2015	Malta		0	0	0	0	
25 October 2015	South Africa	2017 World Cup qualifiers	0	0	0	0	
31 October 2015	South Africa	2017 World Cup qualifiers	1	0	0	4	
