= Rick Stone =

Australian rugby league footballer and coach

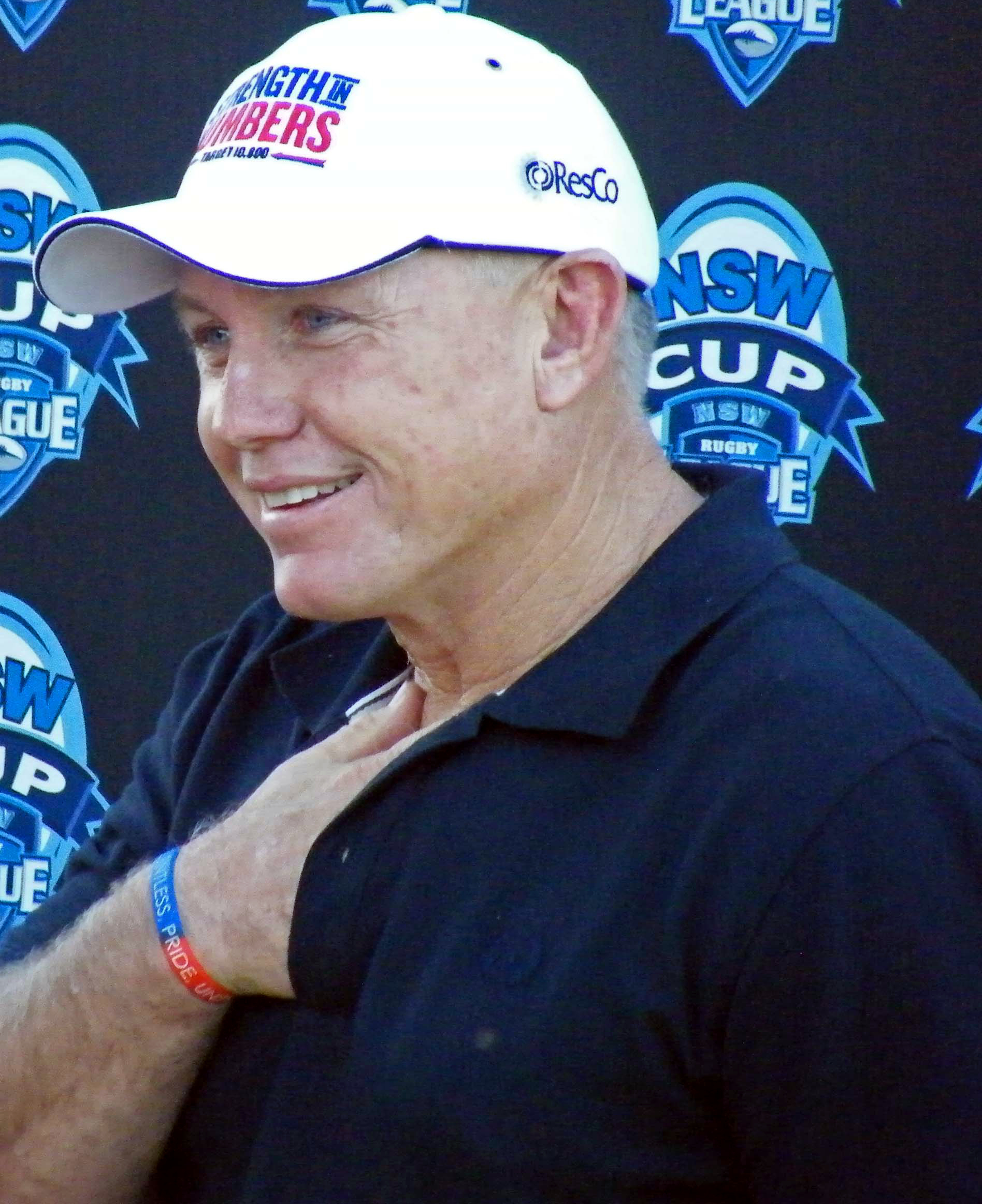
- Stone at a NSW Cup game in 2011

Personal information
- Born: 14 February 1967 (age 59) Australia

Playing information
Club
Years	Team	Pld	T	G	FG	P
1989	South Sydney	3	0	0	0	0

Coaching information
Club
Years	Team	Gms	W	D	L	W%
2009–11	Newcastle Knights	54	25	0	29	46
2015	Newcastle Knights	18	6	0	12	33
2016–18	Huddersfield Giants	47	18	3	26	38
2019	Sydney Roosters Women	3	0	0	3	0
	Total	122	49	3	70	40
Representative
Years	Team	Gms	W	D	L	W%
2005	Queensland Residents	1	0	0	1	0
2011–15	Fiji	8	4	0	4	50
2019	Lebanon	1	0	0	1	0
- Source: As of 4 January 2024
- Relatives: Sam Stone (son)

Rick Stone (born 14 February 1967) is a professional rugby league football coach and former player. He has coached the Newcastle Knights in the National Rugby League, the Huddersfield Giants in the Super League, the Sydney Roosters in the NRL Women's Premiership, and the Fijian and Lebanese national teams.

== Playing career ==
Stone played for the South Sydney Rabbitohs, appearing in three first-grade games in the 1989 Winfield Cup premiership. Stone played for and later captain coached the Nambucca Heads Roosters in the Group 2 Rugby League winning two premierships in 1992 and 1993.

== Coaching career ==
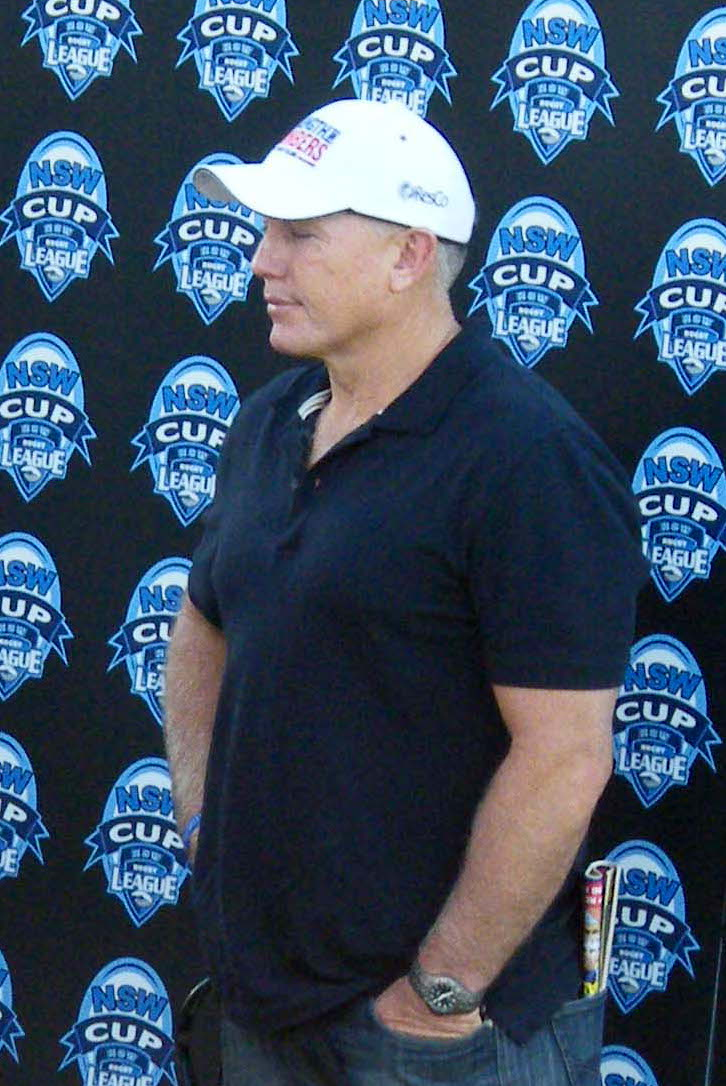
Stone at a NSW Cup game in 2011

In 1994, Stone later joined Queensland Cup side Burleigh whom he coached for 13 seasons, winning three premierships during that time. He coached the club to a 6–10 loss against Great Britain in a warm-up match for the 1999 Tri-nations series.

=== Newcastle Knights ===
Stone started at Newcastle as assistant coach to Michael Hagan. During the 2009 NRL season, Stone's fourth at the Newcastle Knights, the head coach, Brian Smith, resigned. Stone, then assistant coach to Smith, was appointed to the position of coach for the remainder of the season. He enjoyed victory in his first game as head coach of the Knights with a win against the eventual grand final winners Melbourne Storm.

He was named head coach of Fiji in 2011.

With the signing of supercoach Wayne Bennett at the Knights for the next four years starting in 2012, Stone re-signed with the Knights for another 4 years to be assistant coach to Bennett and take over after Bennett left. Stone coached Fiji in their 2013 Rugby League World Cup campaign.

On 11 August 2014, it was announced that Stone would be taking over as coach of the Knights again on a 2-year contract starting in 2015, following Wayne Bennett's decision to move to the Brisbane Broncos in 2015. On 18 October 2014 Stone named a 19-man Fiji team for the Inaugural Hayne/Mannah Cup test match against Lebanon. This match would be Stone's last match as Fiji coach, due to him becoming head coach at the Newcastle Knights again. He was fired as Newcastle's head coach in July 2015.

=== Huddersfield Giants ===
In July 2016, Stone was named as the new head coach of Super League club Huddersfield Giants. After a poor start to the 2018 Super League Season, Stone left his position as Coach.

=== Return to Burleigh ===
On 8 November 2019, it was announced that Stone had signed a two-year contract with Queensland Cup side Burleigh Bears, starting 2020, thus marking his return to the club where he had coached between 1995 and 2005, winning two premierships.
