= Khalid Deeb =

Former Lebanon international rugby league footballer

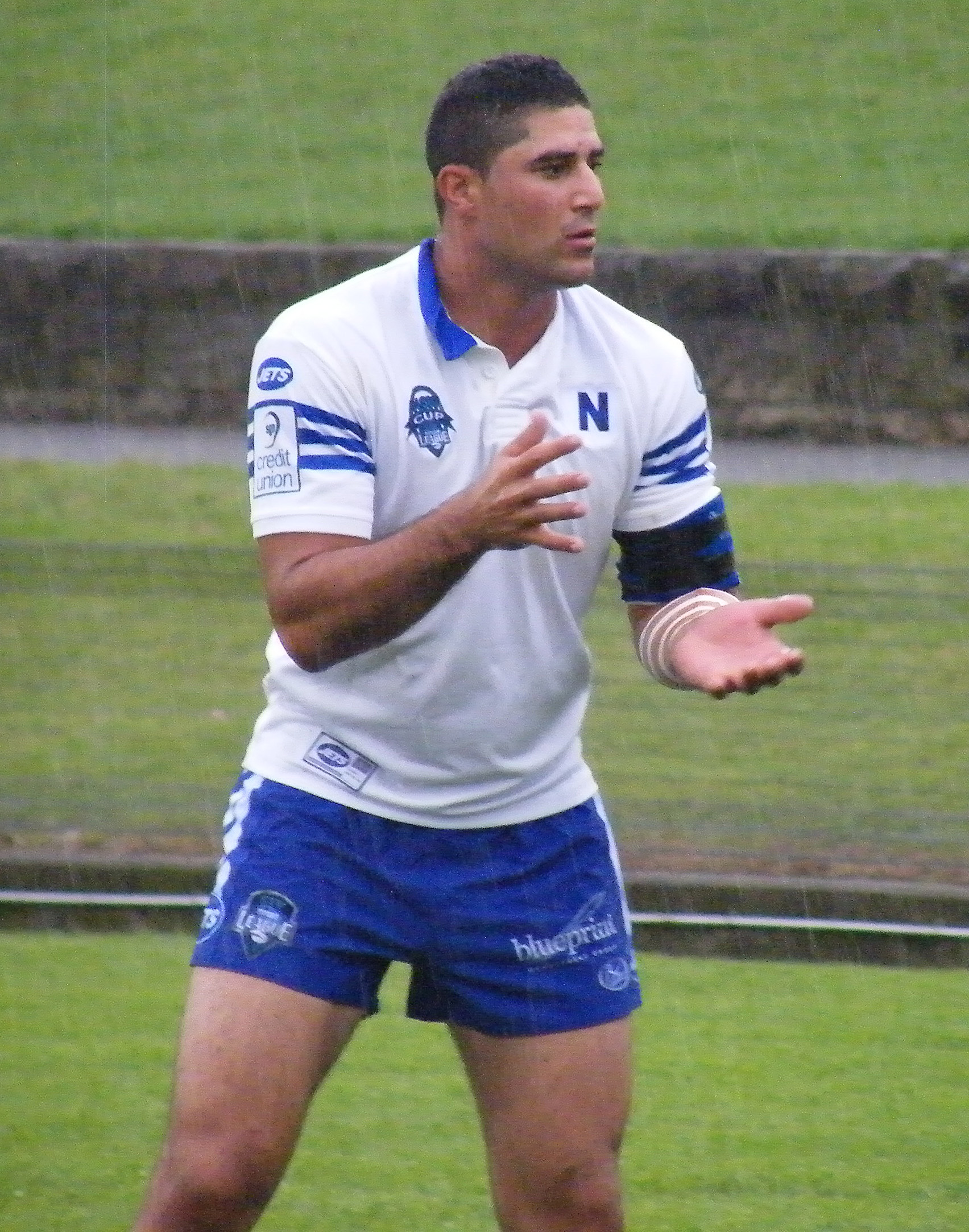
- Khalid Deeb playing for the Newtown Jets in February 2010

Personal information
- Born: 7 April 1982 (age 42); Sydney, New South Wales, Australia
- Height: 192 cm (6 ft 4 in)
- Weight: 100 kg (15 st 10 lb)

Playing information
- Position: Prop, Second-row
Club
Years	Team	Pld	T	G	FG	P
2009	Sydney Roosters	1	0	0	0	0
Representative
Years	Team	Pld	T	G	FG	P
2006–17	Lebanon	13	3	0	0	12
- Source: rleague.com profile As of 30 December 2019

Khalid Deeb (born 7 April 1982) is an Australian professional rugby league footballer who last played for the Cabramatta Two Blues in the Ron Massey Cup competition. He also played for Newtown in the NSW Cup competition and Sydney Roosters in the NRL competition. He played internationally for Lebanon. His position of choice was at prop but could also play at second-row.

== Playing career ==
Deeb played with the Auburn Warriors as a junior. Deeb made his only first-grade appearance for the Sydney Roosters in the 2009 NRL season in a round 25 38–4 loss away to Melbourne Storm, where he came off the bench.

In this same season, he won the Best and Fairest award along with Best Forward awards for Newtown. He played in the Jim Beam Cup finals with Newtown in 2006 and with the Sydney Bulls in 2007.

In 2017, Deeb played for the Cabramatta Two Blues in the Ron Massey Cup.
