= Reagan Campbell-Gillard =

Australia & Fiji international rugby league footballer

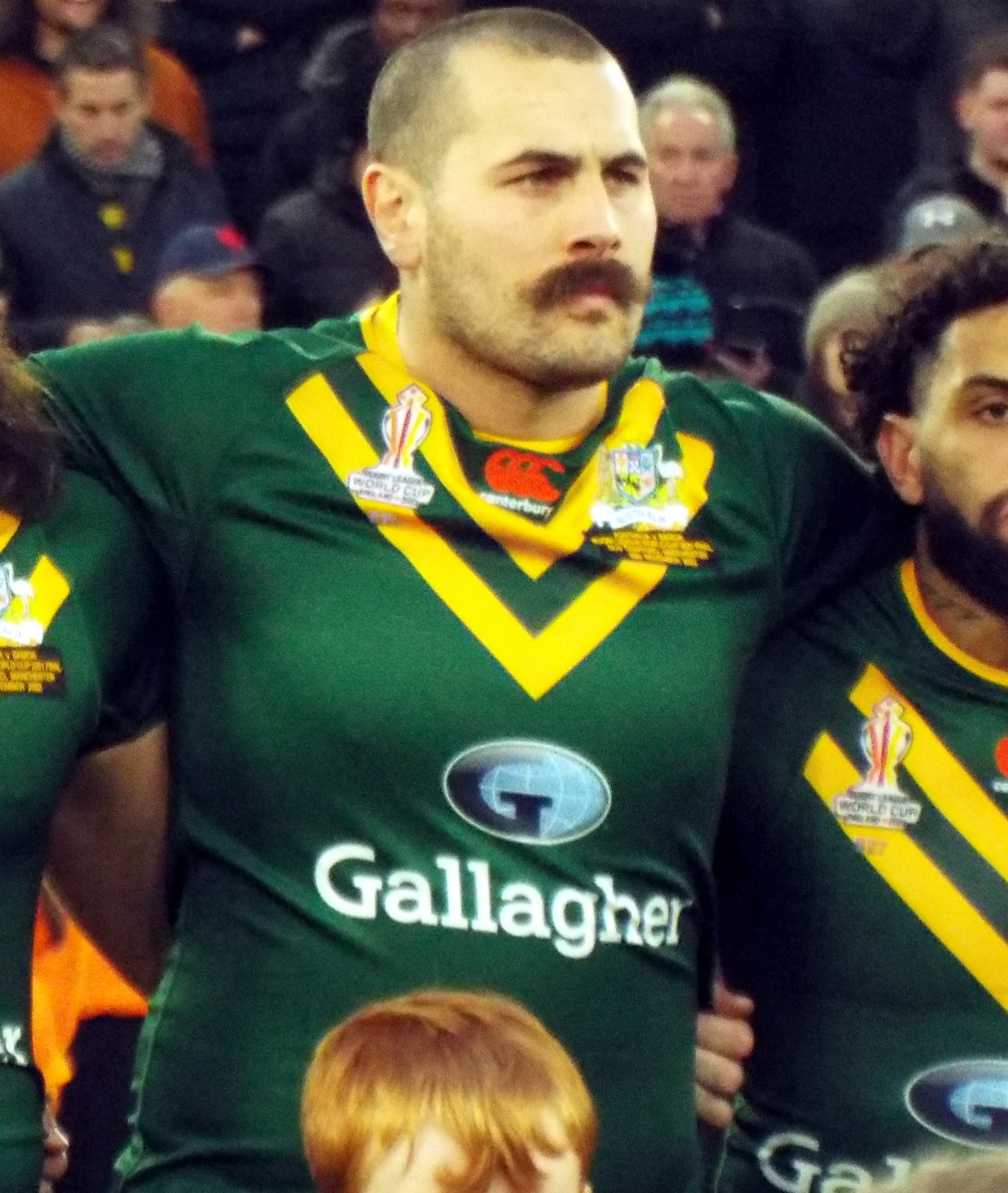

Personal information
- Full name: Reagan Campbell-Gillard
- Born: 27 July 1993 (age 33) Blacktown, New South Wales, Australia
- Height: 6 ft 4 in (1.93 m)
- Weight: 18 st 6 lb (117 kg)

Playing information
- Position: Prop
Club
| Years | Team | Pld | T | G | FG | P |
|---|---|---|---|---|---|---|
| 2015–19 | Penrith Panthers | 114 | 9 | 0 | 0 | 36 |
| 2020–24 | Parramatta Eels | 107 | 13 | 1 | 0 | 54 |
| 2025 | Gold Coast Titans | 24 | 0 | 0 | 0 | 0 |
| 2026– | London Broncos | 27 | 7 | 0 | 0 | 28 |
| | Total | 272 | 29 | 1 | 0 | 118 |
Representative
| Years | Team | Pld | T | G | FG | P |
| 2014 | Fiji | 2 | 0 | 0 | 0 | 0 |
| 2015–16 | NSW City | 2 | 0 | 0 | 0 | 0 |
| 2015–18 | Prime Minister's XIII | 2 | 0 | 0 | 0 | 0 |
| 2017 | World All Stars | 1 | 0 | 0 | 0 | 0 |
| 2017–22 | Australia | 9 | 0 | 0 | 0 | 0 |
| 2018–23 | New South Wales | 3 | 0 | 0 | 0 | 0 |
- Source: As of 8 October 2026
- Relatives: Ashton Sims (cousin); Korbin Sims (cousin); Tariq Sims (cousin); Ruan Sims (cousin)

Reagan Campbell-Gillard (born 27 July 1993), also known by the nickname "RCG", is a professional rugby league footballer who captains and plays as a prop forward for the London Broncos in the Super League. He has also played for both Fiji and Australia at international level.

He previously played for the Penrith Panthers, Parramatta Eels and the Gold Coast Titans in the NRL. Campbell-Gillard has represented the NSW City Origin team, Prime Minister's XIII, World All Stars and New South Wales in State of Origin.

== Background ==
Campbell-Gillard was born in Blacktown, New South Wales, Australia and is of Fijian descent. The son of Warwick Gillard and Georgina Campbell, Campbell-Gillard commented that he never knew his father, saying "I don't speak to him. I haven't had a father my whole life." He was raised in Mount Druitt, New South Wales by his single mother, a Fijian emigrant.

Campbell-Gillard played his junior rugby league for the Rooty Hill Dragons but gave up the sport, and instead played soccer and hockey during his early teens. He returned to rugby league playing for the Windsor Wolves at the suggestion of his Hills Sports High School-classmate Kieren Moss, and was subsequently recruited by the Penrith Panthers to play in their S. G. Ball Cup team.

Campbell-Gillard is the cousin of the Sims siblings; fellow Fijian internationals Ashton, Tariq and Korbin and dual-code women's rugby international Ruan.

== Playing career ==
=== Early career ===
In 2012 and 2013, Campbell-Gillard played for the Penrith Panthers NYC team.

On 24 April 2013, he re-signed with the Penrith club on a three-year contract.

On 27 August 2013, Campbell-Gillard was named on the interchange bench in the 2013 NYC Team of the Year.

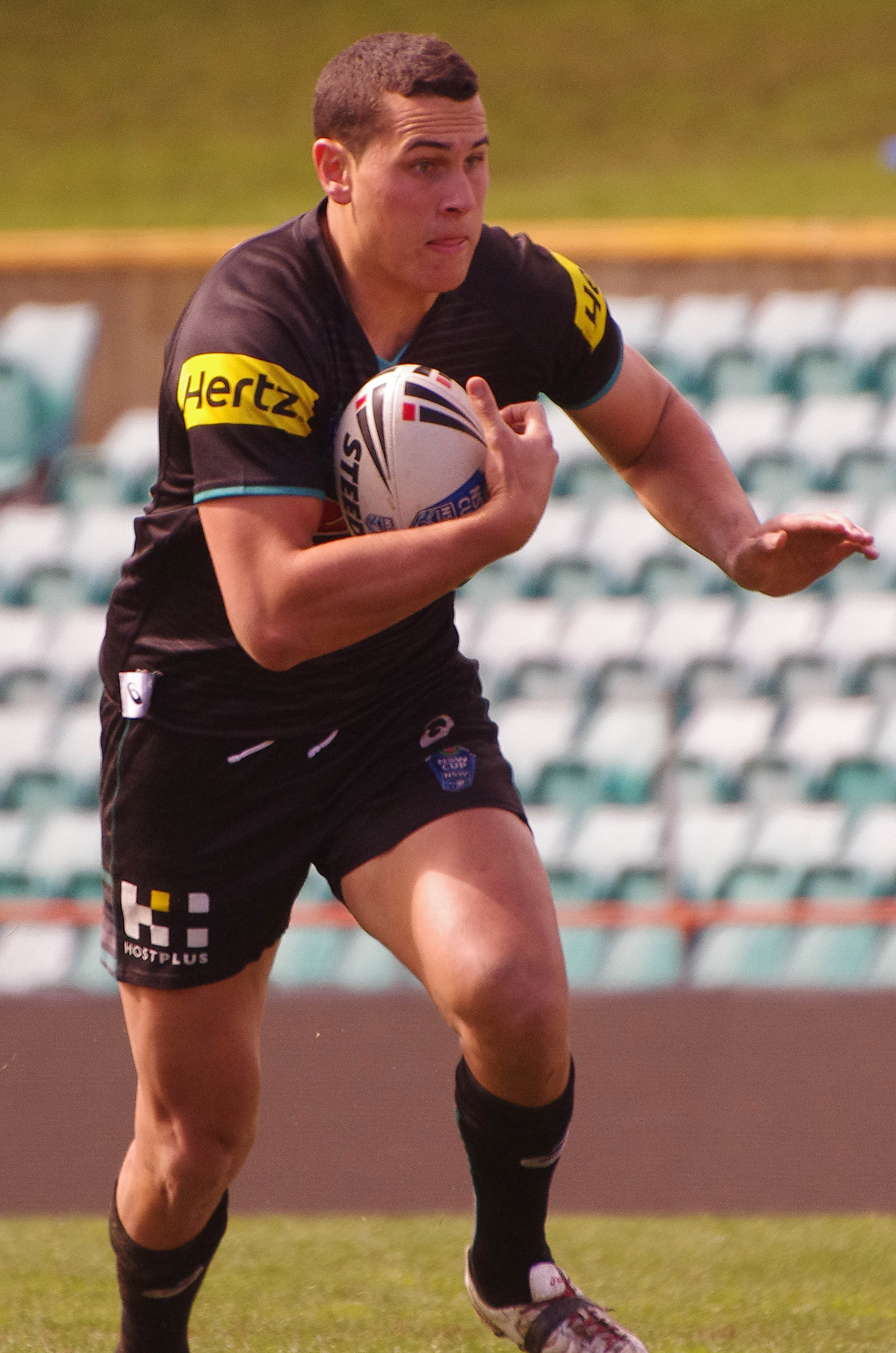
Campbell-Gillard playing for Penrith in 2014

On 6 October 2013, Campbell-Gillard played in Penrith's Holden Cup Grand final against the New Zealand Warriors, starting at prop in the 42-30 victory.

On 13 October 2013, Campbell-Gillard played for the Junior Kangaroos against the Junior Kiwis, playing off the interchange bench in the 38-26 win at Jubilee Oval.

=== 2014 ===
In 2014, he graduated to the Panthers' New South Wales Cup team. In 2014, Campbell-Gillard graduated to the Panthers New South Wales Cup team.

On 3 May 2014, Campbell-Gillard made his international debut for Fiji against Samoa in the 2014 Pacific Test, playing off the interchange bench in the 32-16 loss at Penrith Stadium. On 19 October 2014, Campbell-Gillard would again play for Fiji against Lebanon in the 2014 Hayne/Mannah Cup, starting at prop in the 40-28 win at Shark Park.

=== 2015 ===
In January 2015, Campbell-Gillard was named in Penrith's 2015 NRL Auckland Nines squad.

In Round 1 of the 2015 NRL season, Campbell-Gillard made his NRL debut for the Penrith Panthers against the Canterbury-Bankstown Bulldogs, playing off the interchange bench in the 24-18 win at Penrith Stadium.

After playing in eight matches for the Penrith club, on 3 May 2015, Campbell-Gillard was selected to play for City Origin against Country Origin, playing off the interchange bench in the 34-22 loss in Wagga Wagga.

On 9 June 2015, Campbell-Gillard re-signed with the Penrith club on a four-year contract.

In Round 23 against the New Zealand Warriors, Campbell-Gillard scored his first NRL career try in the 24-10 win at Penrith Stadium.

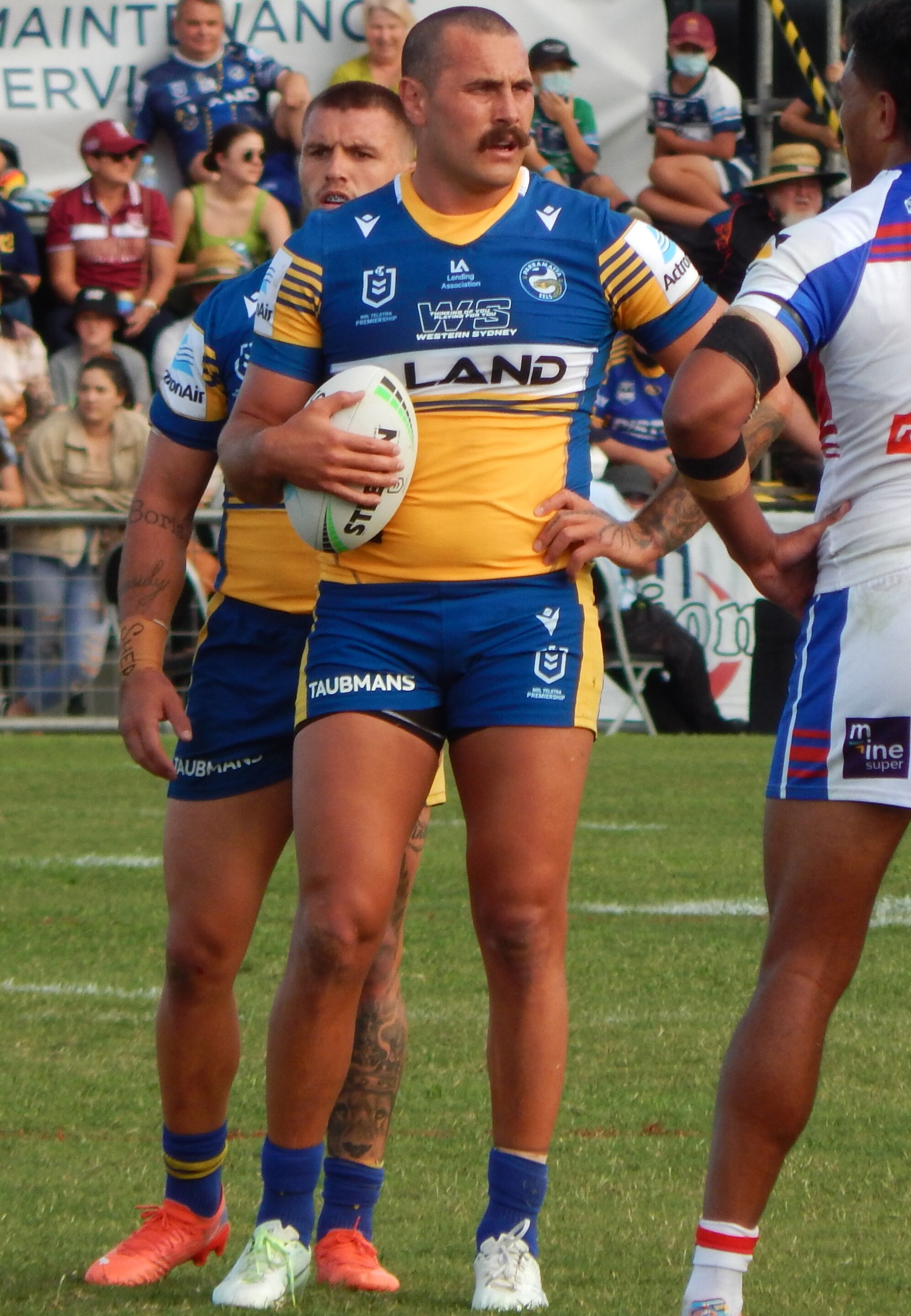
Campbell-Gillard playing for the Parramatta Eels in 2021

Campbell-Gillard finished his debut year in the NRL, playing in all of Penrith's 24 matches and scoring one try in the 2015 NRL season.

On 26 September 2015, Campbell-Gillard played for the Prime Minister's XIII against Papua New Guinea, starting at prop in the 40-12 win in Port Moresby.

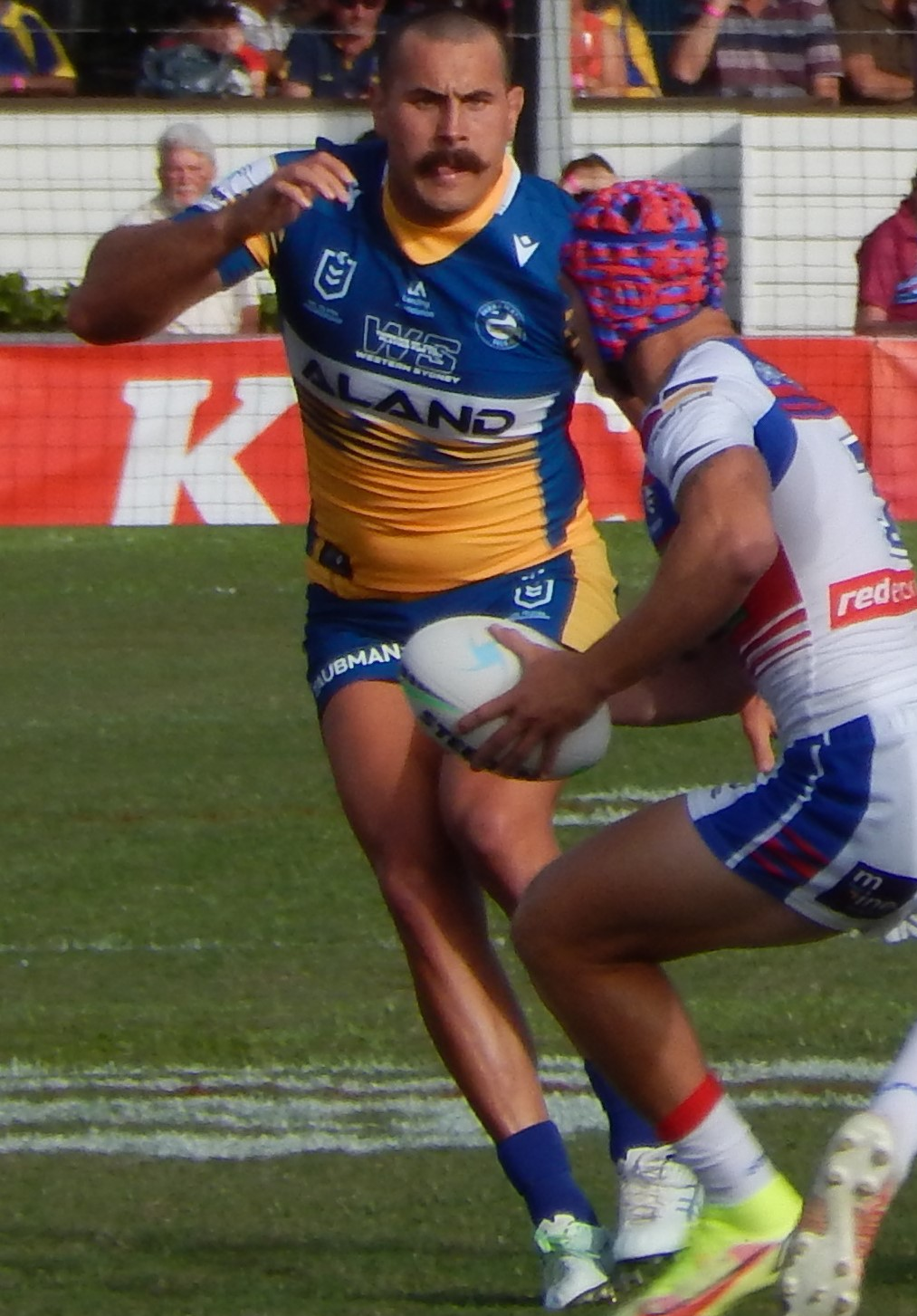
Campbell-Gillard playing against Newcastle in 2021

=== 2016 ===
On 8 May 2016, Campbell-Gillard again played for City Origin against Country Origin, starting at prop in the 44-30 win in Tamworth.

In Round 25 against the Gold Coast Titans, Campbell-Gillard suffered a season ending back injury after he was hit by a late shoulder charge in the back by Ryan James during the Penrith club's 15-14 win at Robina Stadium. Campbell-Gillard had 2 vertebrae fractured and couldn't change out of his playing kit for 2 days due to the seriousness of the injury. Campbell-Gillard finished the 2016 NRL season playing in 20 matches and scoring two tries for the Penrith club.

=== 2017 ===
On 10 February 2017, Campbell-Gillard returned from a broken back to represent his Fijian heritage while playing for the World All Stars against the Indigenous All Stars, starting at prop in the 34-8 loss at Hunter Stadium.

After showing great form at the front when the Penrith club climbed up the ladder to make it into the finals series after winning 11 from 13 matches, at the 2017 Dally M Awards night, Campbell-Gillard received the inaugural Dally M Interchange Player of the Year award.

Campbell-Gillard finished his best season up to date playing in all of Penrith's 26 matches and scoring three tries in the 2017 NRL season.

On 4 October 2017, Campbell-Gillard was awarded with the Merv Cartwright Medal as the Penrith Panthers Player of the Year.

After he was originally going to play represent Fiji in the 2017 Rugby League World Cup, on 5 October 2017, Campbell-Gillard received a well deserved call up into the Australia Kangaroos 24-man squad after the withdrawal of Andrew Fifita who switched over to play for Tonga. On 27 October 2017, Campbell-Gillard made his international debut for Australia against England, playing off the interchange bench in the 18-4 win at AAMI Park.

Campbell-Gillard played in 5 matches in the tournament including playing off the interchange bench in the Kangaroos 6-0 gritty World Cup Final win over England at Suncorp Stadium.

=== 2018 ===
Campbell-Gillard started the 2018 NRL season in good form up front as the Penrith Panthers were holding into a spot in the top 4.

Campbell-Gillard's efforts would reward him with selection in the New South Wales squad.

On 6 June 2018, Campbell-Gillard made his representative debut for New South Wales in Game 1 of the 2018 State of Origin series against Queensland, starting at prop as the Blues won 22-12 at the MCG.

=== 2019 ===
On 14 September 2019, Campbell-Gillard was granted a release by Penrith to take up a five-year deal with the Parramatta Eels that would end in 2024. Campbell-Gillard later spoke of his move to Parramatta saying “I've known this club for nearly 10 years. You want to be a one-club man, but we're in a business that doesn't allow you for it, I'm nervous, excited, but sad at the same time, to move on, It was one of those years that I really want to forget, I really hated rugby league this year. It's just been a frustrating year.

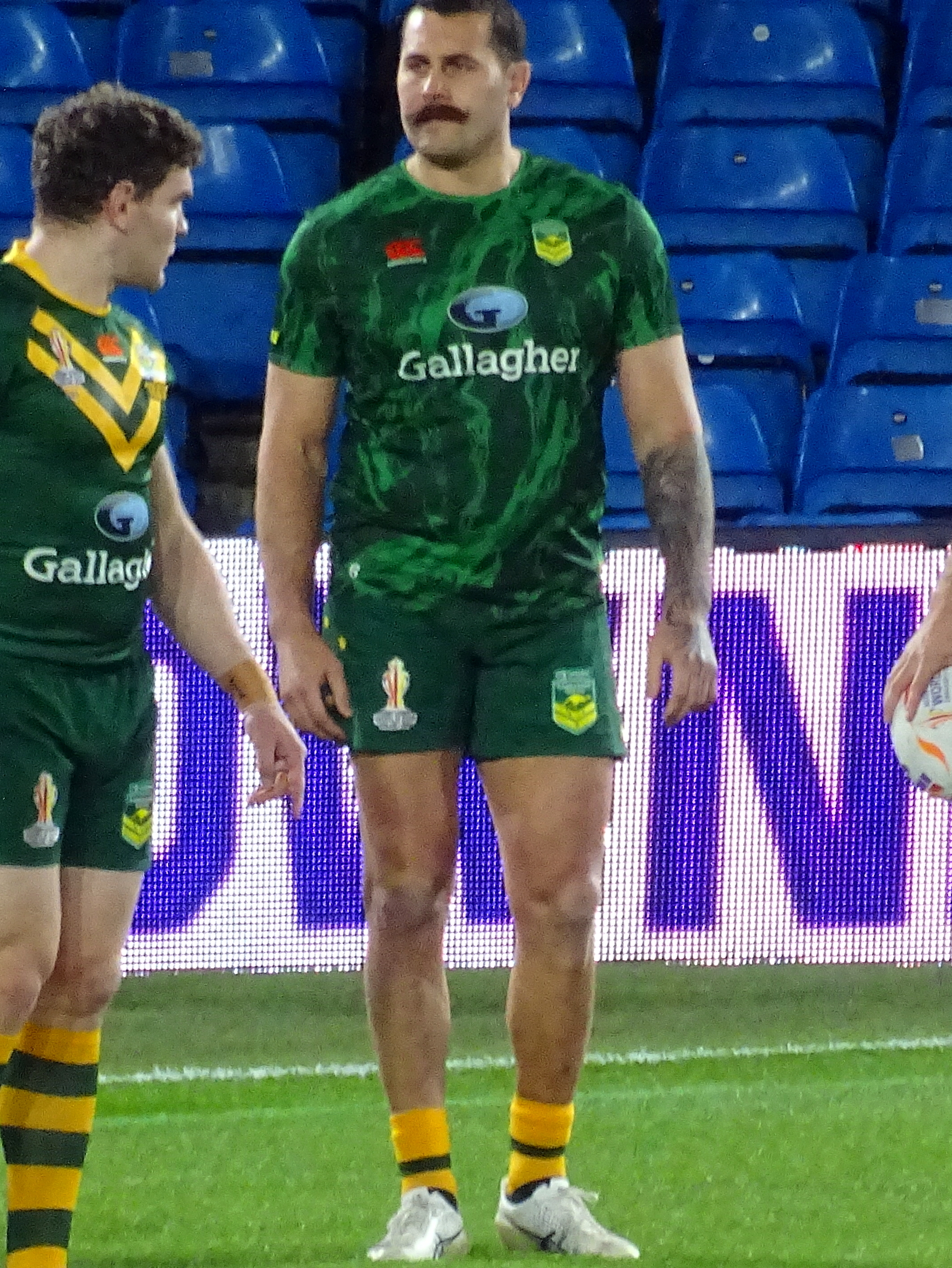
Campbell-Gillard warming up for the Kangaroos in 2022

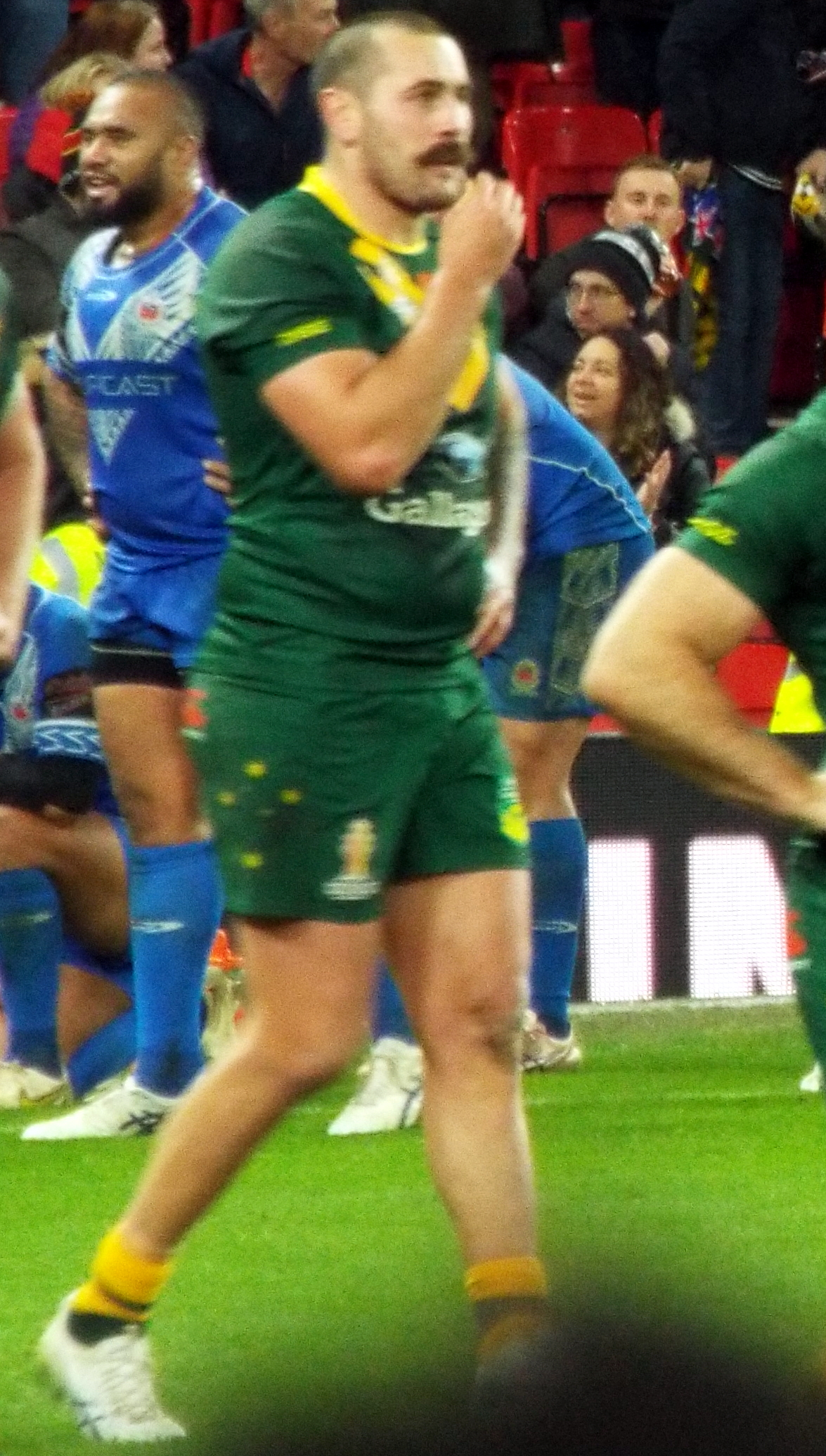
Campbell-Gillard playing against Samoa in 2022

=== 2020 ===
Campbell-Gillard made his debut for Parramatta in round 1 of the 2020 NRL season against arch rivals Canterbury-Bankstown. Parramatta would go on to win the match 8-2.

In round 11 against Wests Tigers, Campbell-Gillard scored his first try for Parramatta, a 50-metre solo effort in which he beat three Wests players on the way to the try line. Parramatta would go on to win the match 26-16 at Bankwest Stadium.

He made a total of 21 appearances for Parramatta in the 2020 NRL season as the club finished third but were eliminated from the finals in straight sets.

=== 2021 ===
In round 10 of the 2021 NRL season, he scored two tries for Parramatta in a 34-18 victory over the New Zealand Warriors.

In round 20, Campbell-Gillard was taken from the field during Parramatta's 28-0 loss against the Sydney Roosters. Campbell-Gillard was later ruled out for an indefinite period with a hamstring injury.

Campbell-Gillard played 20 games for Parramatta in the 2021 NRL season including both of the club's finals matches as they were eliminated from the competition at the semi-final stage for the third consecutive season.

In late October 2021, Campbell-Gillard announced he was not activating his player option, which would make him a free agent in 2023. On 5 November, Campbell-Gillard re-signed with Parramatta until the end of 2025, which was worth up to $2.4 million.

=== 2022 ===
On 29 May, Campbell-Gillard was selected by New South Wales to play in game one of the 2022 State of Origin series.

On 19 June, Campbell-Gillard was not selected for game two of the series after New South Wales had lost the opening match 16-10.

In the 2022 preliminary final, Campbell-Gillard scored two tries for Parramatta in their 24-20 upset victory over North Queensland at the Queensland Country Bank Stadium. The club reached their first grand final since 2009.

Campbell-Gillard played at prop in Parramatta's 2022 NRL Grand Final loss to Penrith.

In October, Campbell-Gillard was named in the Australia squad for the 2021 Rugby League World Cup.

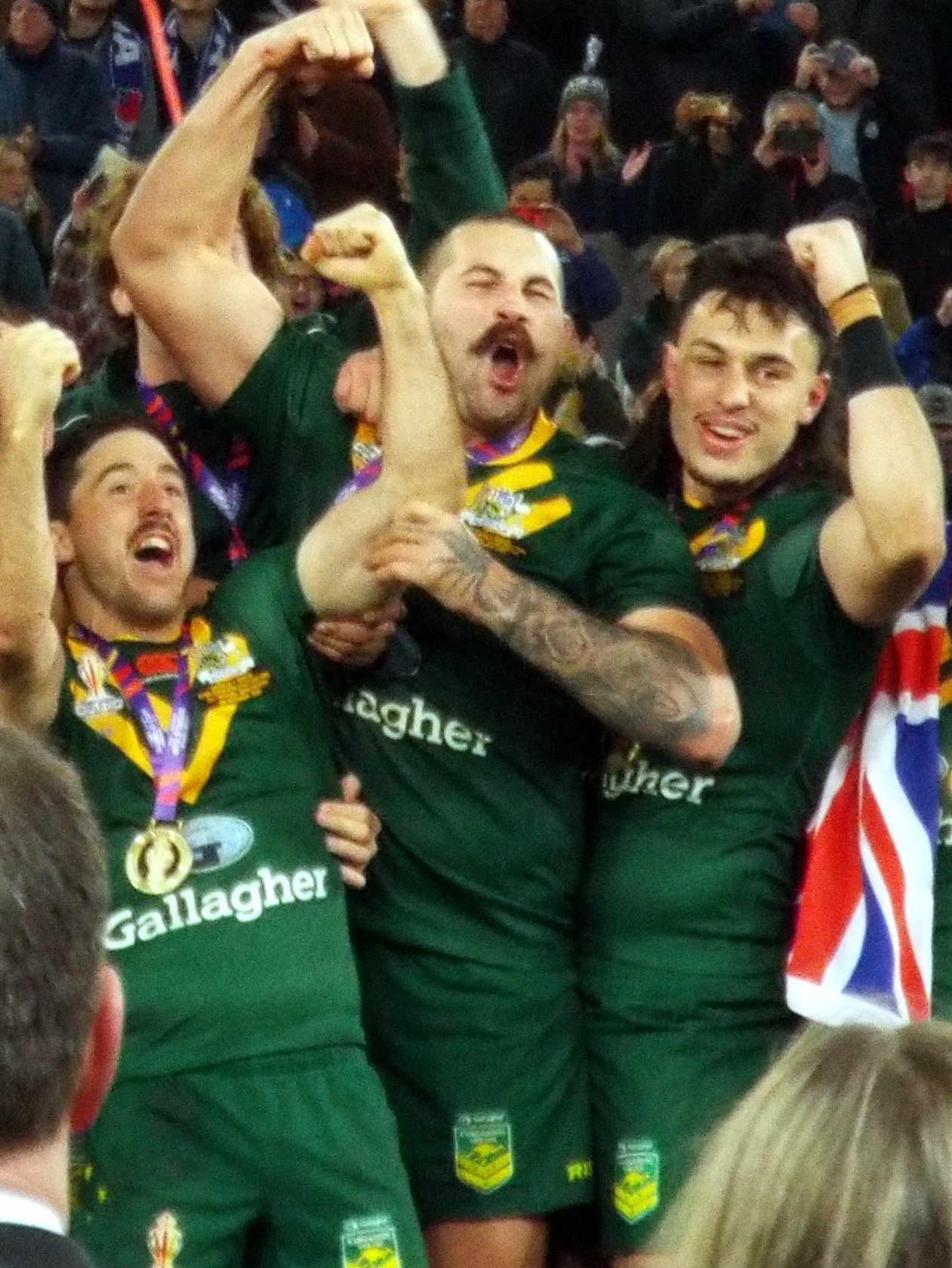
Campbell-Gillard celebrating after the World Cup Final in 2022

Campbell-Gillard played for Australia in the 2021 Rugby League World Cup final where they defeated Samoa 30-10 to claim their 12th title.

=== 2023 ===
In round 8 of the 2023 NRL season, Campbell-Gillard was taken from the field during the second half after a tackle by Brisbane's Payne Haas. Despite two other players being sent to the sin bin during the game for similar tackles, Haas remained on the field. On 26 April, the Parramatta club announced Campbell-Gillard would be ruled out for at least two months with a high grade groin injury.

On 3 July, Campbell-Gillard was selected by New South Wales for game 3 of the 2023 State of Origin series.

During Parramatta's round 20 victory over the Gold Coast, Campbell-Gillard was placed on report and sin binned for a late tackle on Chris Randall where he fell over the top of the player with his knees hitting Randall in the back. Campbell-Gillard was later handed a four-match suspension over the incident.

Campbell-Gillard played a total of 14 games for Parramatta in the 2023 NRL season as the club finished 10th on the table.

=== 2024 ===
Campbell-Gillard played 24 games for Parramatta in the 2024 NRL season as the club finished 15th on the table. On 10 September, he was granted a release from the final year of his contract.

On the same day, Campbell-Gillard was awarded with the Ken Thornett medal after being voted the clubs best player of the season.

On 4 October, Campbell-Gillard signed a three year deal to join the Gold Coast Titans in 2025.

=== 2025 ===
On 16 January, the Gold Coast outfit confirmed that Campbell-Gillard had injured his shoulder during pre-season training and would miss a month, the team confirmed he would be ready for Gold Coast's first game of the season in round 2. Campbell-Gillard made his club debut for the Gold Coast in round 2 of the 2025 NRL season against Canterbury at Belmore Sports Ground which ended in a 40-24 loss. Campbell-Gillard played 24 games for the Gold Coast in the 2025 NRL season as the club narrowly avoided the wooden spoon finishing 16th.

On 19 September, it was reported that wife of Campbell-Gillard took a parting shot at the Gold Coast club by advertising the player's training gear on Facebook marketplace with a picture of the items being shown out on the front lawn. The caption attached to the picture read “Any Gold Coast Titans supporters want a travel bag filled with 2025 training gear".

On 7 October the Gold Coast outfit announced that Campbell-Gillard was released from his contract and would depart the club for the London Broncos.

=== 2026 ===
In January 2026 Wally Lewis presided over a ceremony in which Campbell-Gillard was named as captain of the London Broncos for the 2026 RFL Championship season, taking over from long-term captain Will Lovell.

In round 1 he scored a try on his debut for London in the win over the Widnes Vikings.

In August 2026, he was part of the Broncos squad that lifted the RFL Championship Leaders' Shield.

On 31 August, Campbell-Gillard played in London's 32-10 victory over Widnes in the 1895 Cup final.

In October 2026, he played in the Broncos Championship Grand Final victory over Doncaster at Plough Lane.

In 2026 he captained the London Broncos squad that secured their historic treble of League Leaders' Shield, 1895 Cup and Grand Final victories.

== Boxing ==
In October 2023, Campbell-Gillard made his professional boxing debut in Townsville. He defeated Jason Taumalolo by split decision.

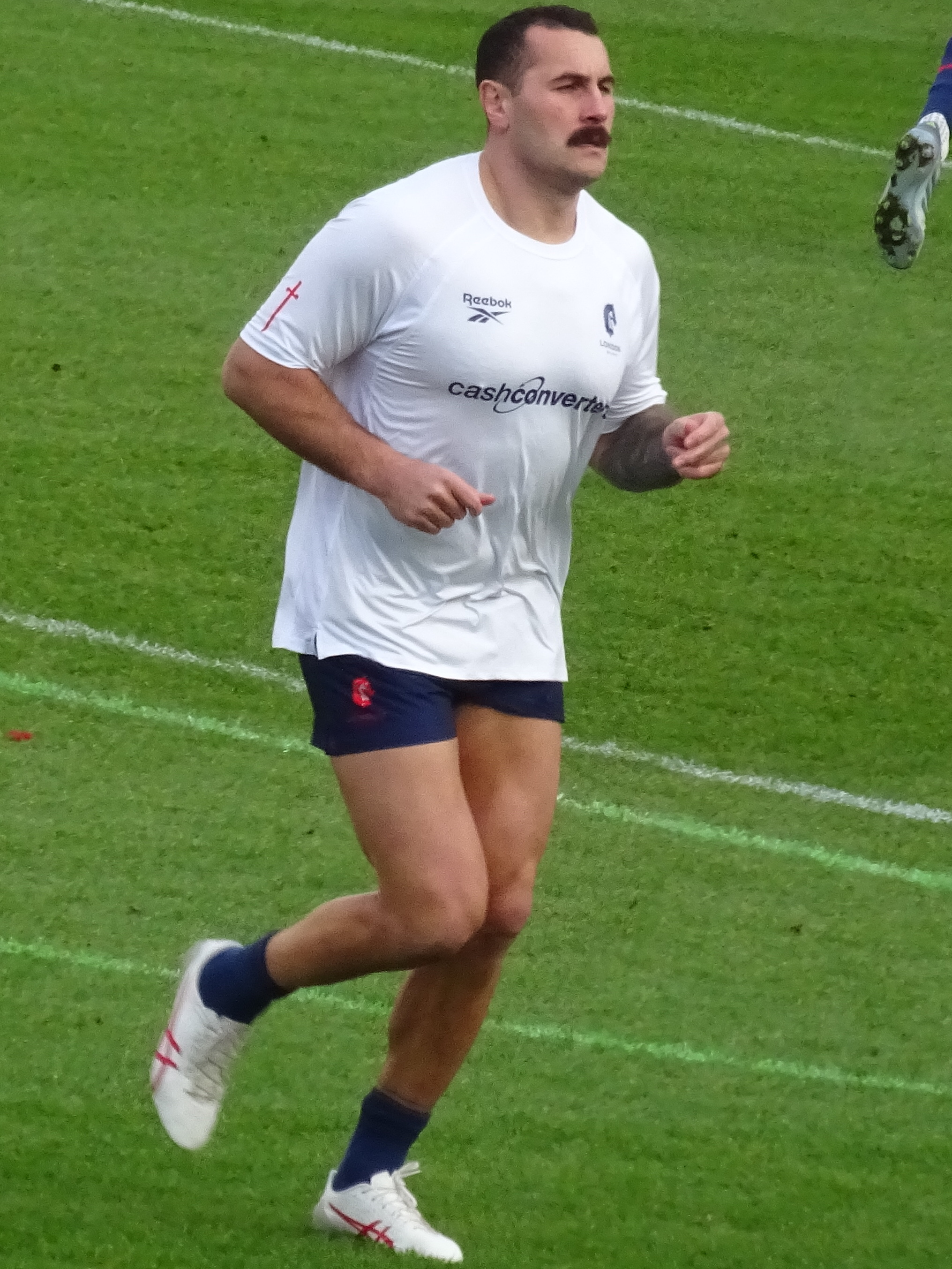
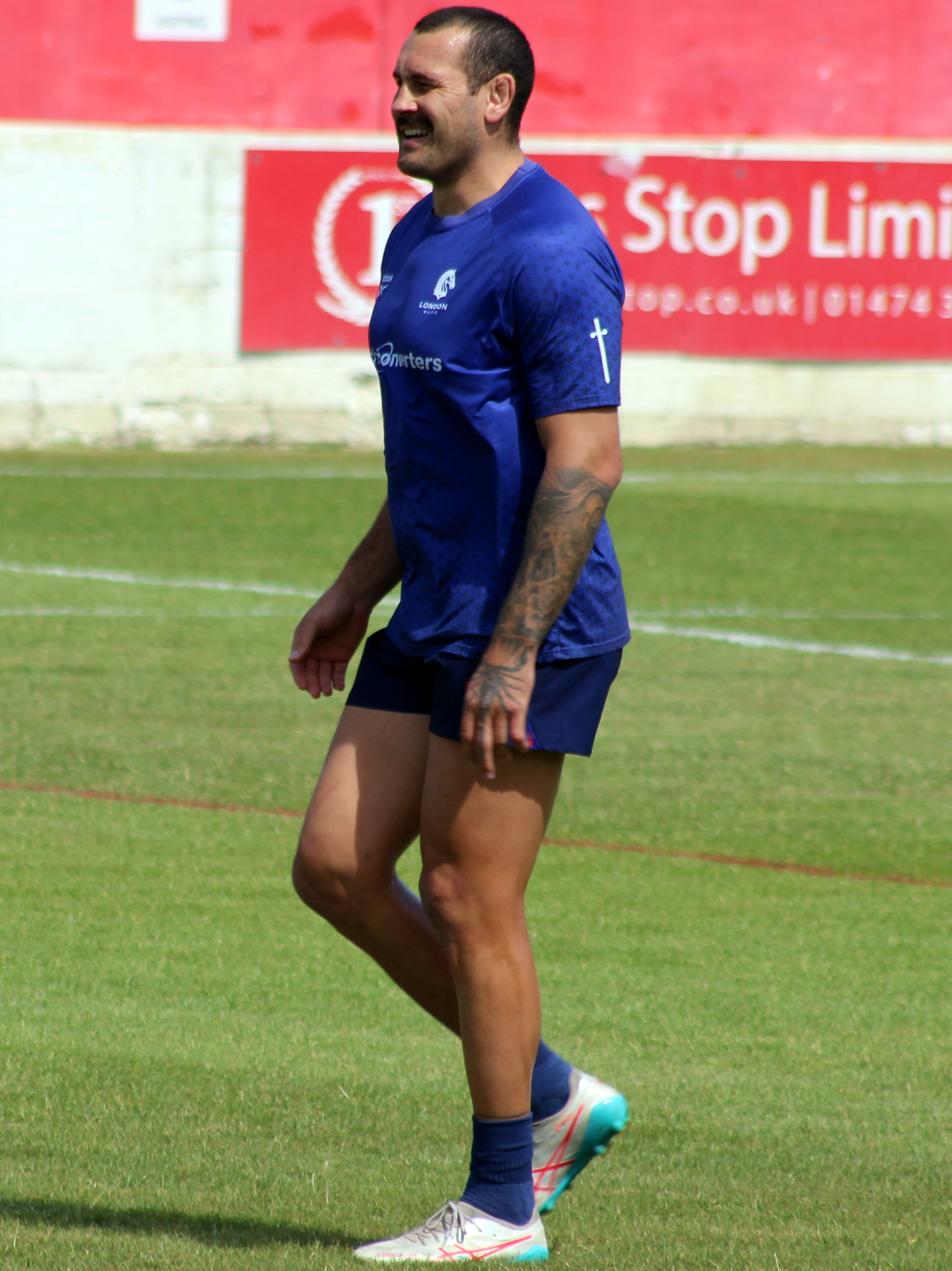
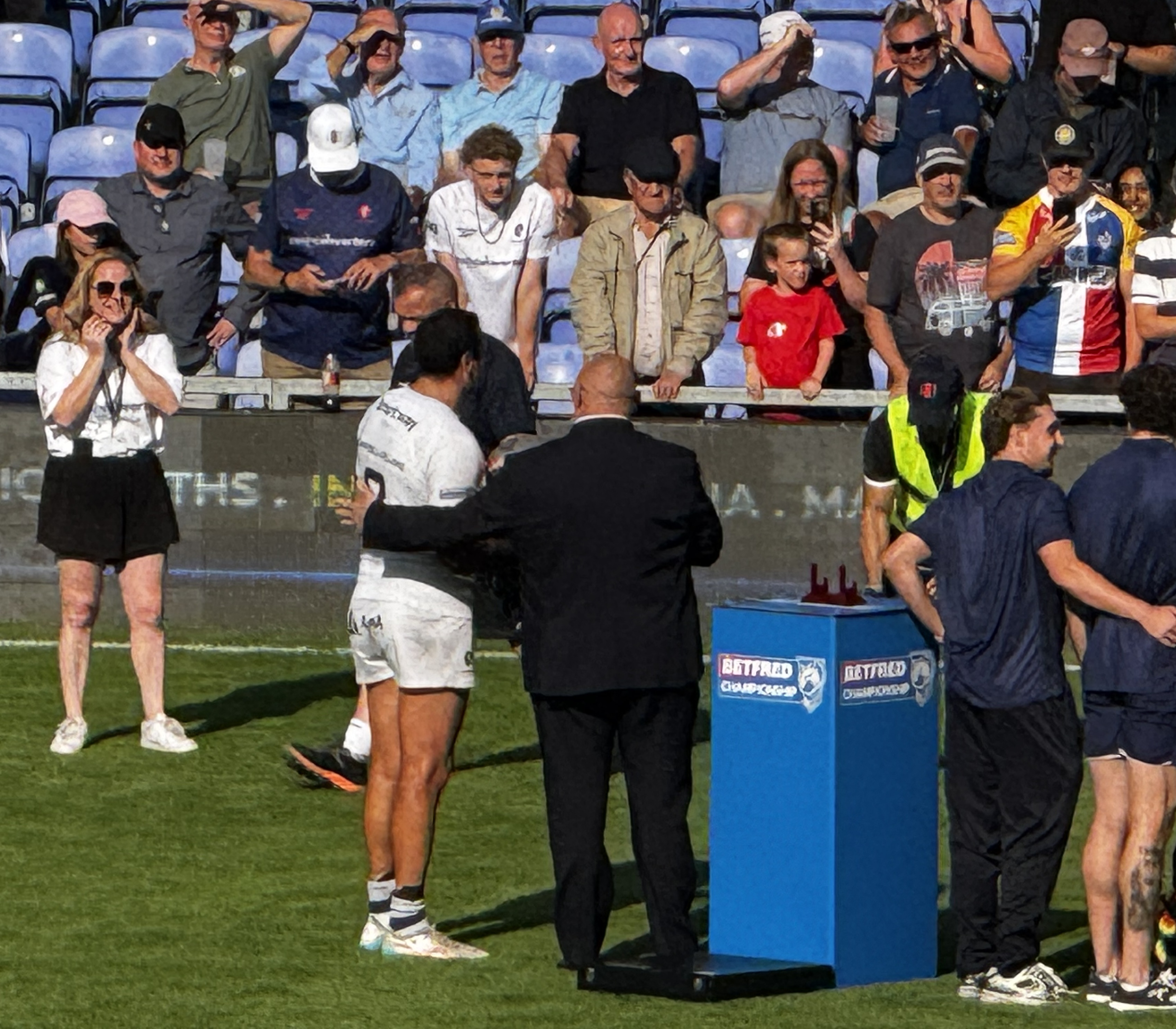
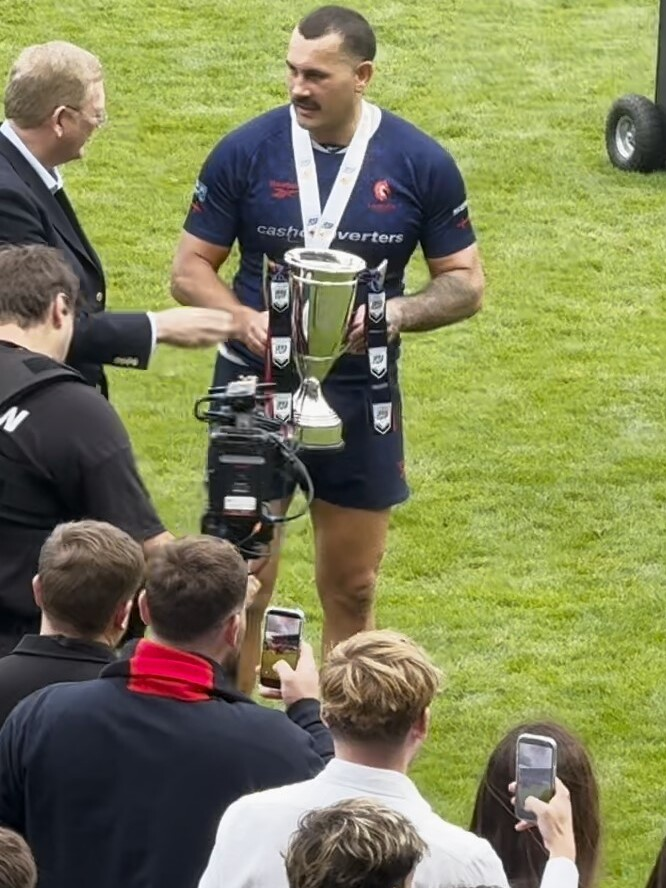
Reagan Campbell-Gillard with the London Broncos in 2026

== Club statistics ==
| Year | Team | Games | Tries | Goals | Points | Notes |
|---|---|---|---|---|---|---|
| 2015 | Penrith Panthers | 24 | 1 | 0 | 4 | |
| 2016 | Penrith Panthers | 20 | 2 | 0 | 8 | |
| 2017 | Penrith Panthers | 26 | 3 | 0 | 12 | |
| 2018 | Penrith Panthers | 21 | 2 | 0 | 8 | |
| 2019 | Penrith Panthers | 23 | 1 | 0 | 4 | |
| 2020 | Parramatta Eels | 21 | 1 | 0 | 4 | |
| 2021 | Parramatta Eels | 20 | 4 | 0 | 16 | |
| 2022 | Parramatta Eels | 28 | 3 | 0 | 12 | |
| 2023 | Parramatta Eels | 14 | 3 | 0 | 12 | |
| 2024 | Parramatta Eels | 24 | 2 | 1 | 10 | |
| 2025 | Gold Coast Titans | 24 | 0 | 0 | 0 | |
| 2026 | London Broncos | 27 | 7 | 0 | 28 | |
| 2027 | London Broncos | | | | | |
| | Totals | 272 | 29 | 1 | 118 | |
