= Sarafu Fatiaki =

Fiji international rugby league footballer

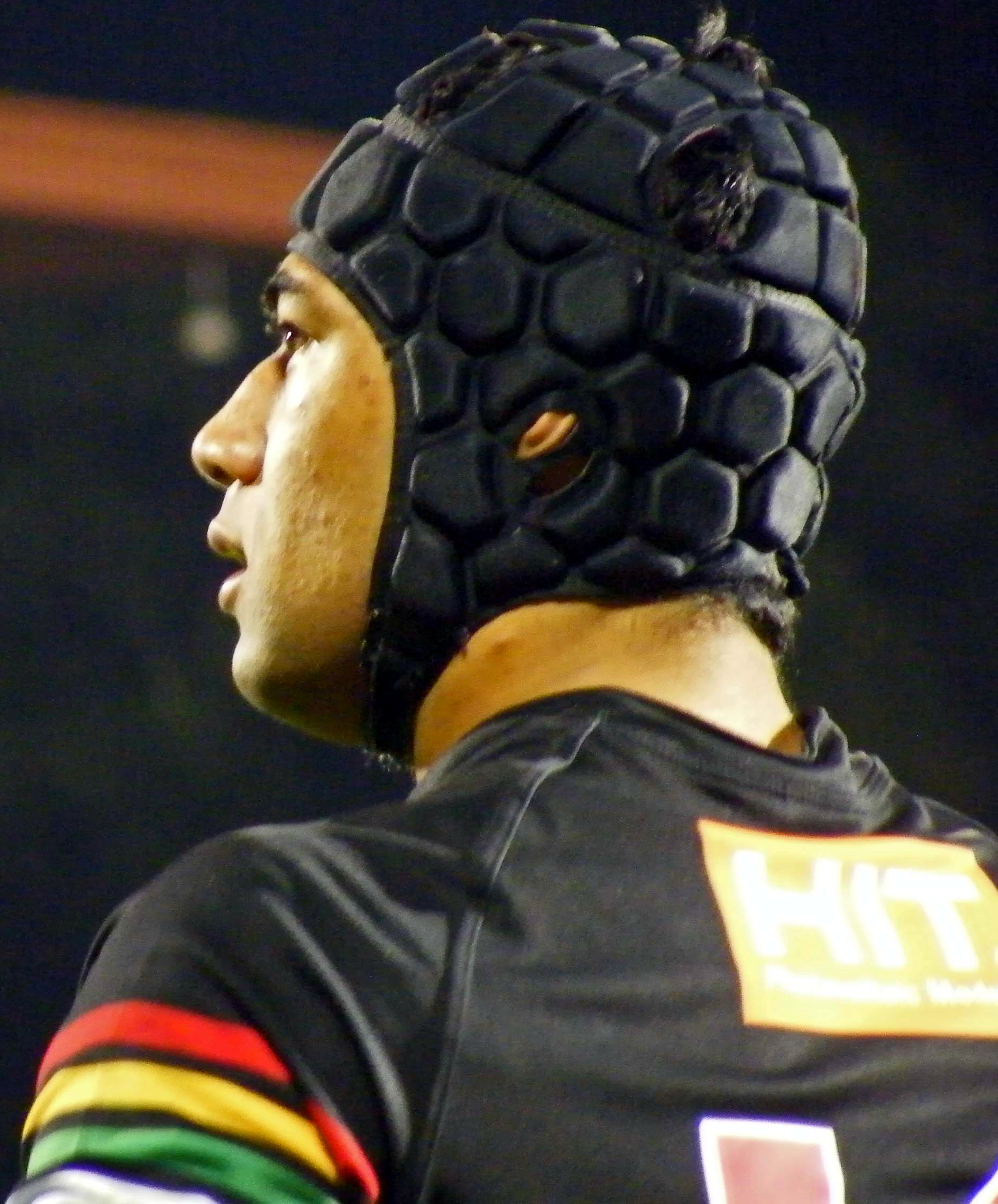

Personal information
- Born: 26 July 1990 (age 36) Suva, Fiji
- Height: 1.90 m (6 ft 3 in)
- Weight: 98 kg (15 st 6 lb)

Playing information
- Position: Lock
Club
Years	Team	Pld	T	G	FG	P
2011	Penrith Panthers	8	0	0	0	0
Representative
Years	Team	Pld	T	G	FG	P
2012	Fiji	1	0	0	0	0

Sarafu Fatiaki (born 26 July 1990) is a Fijian rugby league footballer who played for the Penrith Panthers in the National Rugby League. Fatiaki's preferred position is second-row or lock.

== Playing career ==
Fatiaki made his NRL debut against Parramatta in round two of the 2011 NRL season. Fatiaki's junior club was the St Clair Comets and despite not playing any representative football, earned his call up through strong performances.

After coming off-contract with the Penrith Panthers in 2012, he later played for the Redcliffe Dolphins in the Queensland Cup. Fatiaki played for Fiji against Italy in 2012. In 2017, Fatiaki played for the Blacktown Workers Sea Eagles in the NSW Cup. The following year, he returned to Penrith and played for their NSW Cup team.
