= Peni Botiki =

Fijian rugby league footballer

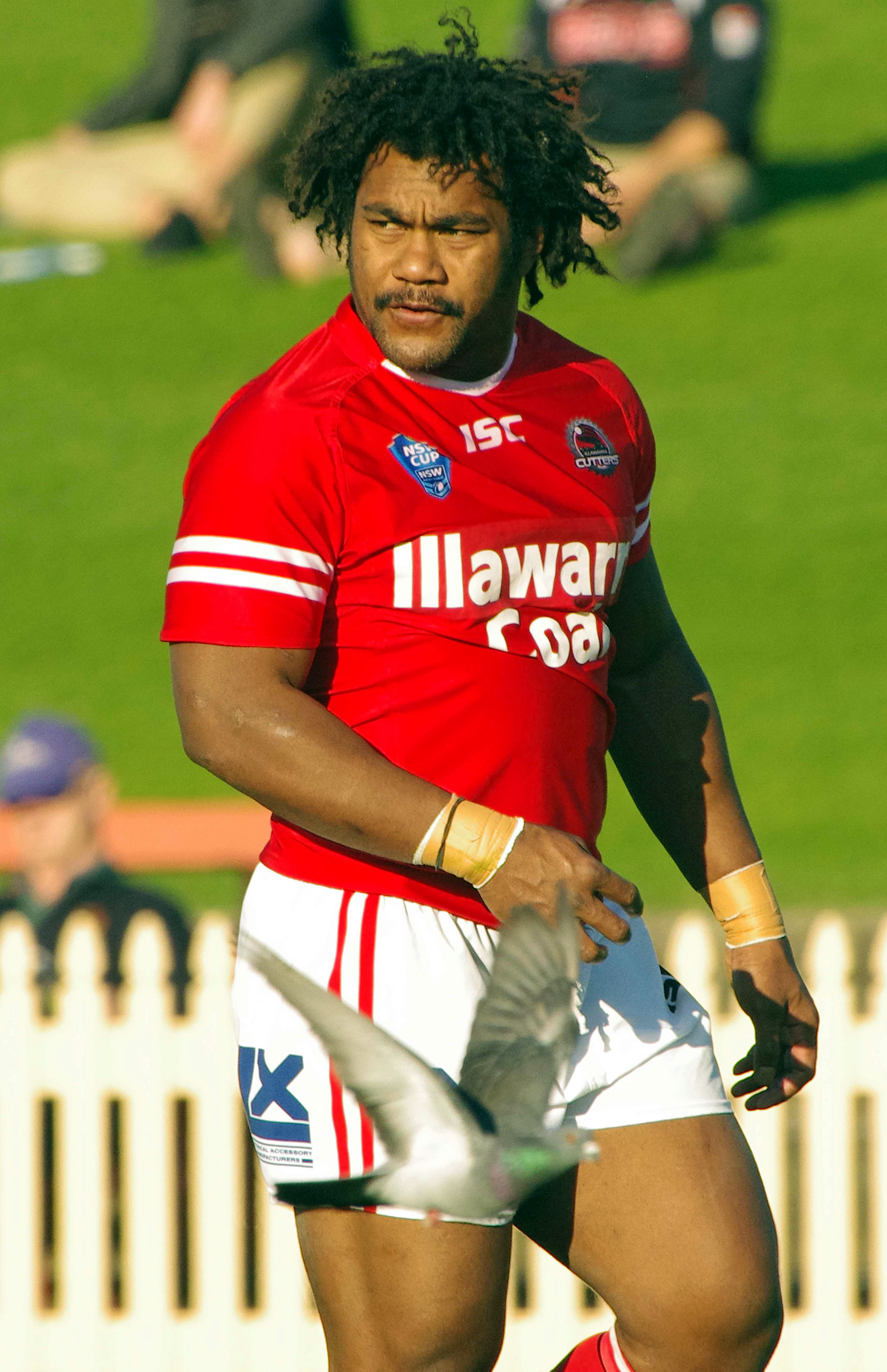

Personal information
- Born: 30 January 1989 (age 37) Fiji
- Height: 170 cm (5 ft 7 in)
- Weight: 100 kg (15 st 10 lb)

Playing information
- Position: Centre, Loose forward, Prop
Representative
Years	Team	Pld	T	G	FG	P
2013–14	Fiji	3	0	0	0	0
- Source: As of 3 May 2014

Peni Botiki is a Fijian rugby league footballer who represented Fiji in the 2013 World Cup.

== Playing career ==
Botiki played for the Saru Dragons in the Western Conference of the Fiji National Rugby League Competition, winning the player of the year award in 2011.

In 2012 he moved to Australia, joining the Collegians in the Illawarra Rugby League competition. At the end of the year he was named the Australian Fiji Rugby League player of the year.

He returned to Fiji and the Saru Dragons for the 2013 season. In 2013, Botiki was named in the Fiji squad for the World Cup.

In May 2014, Botiki played for Fiji in the 2014 Pacific Rugby League International.
