= Travis Robinson =

Lebanon international rugby league footballer

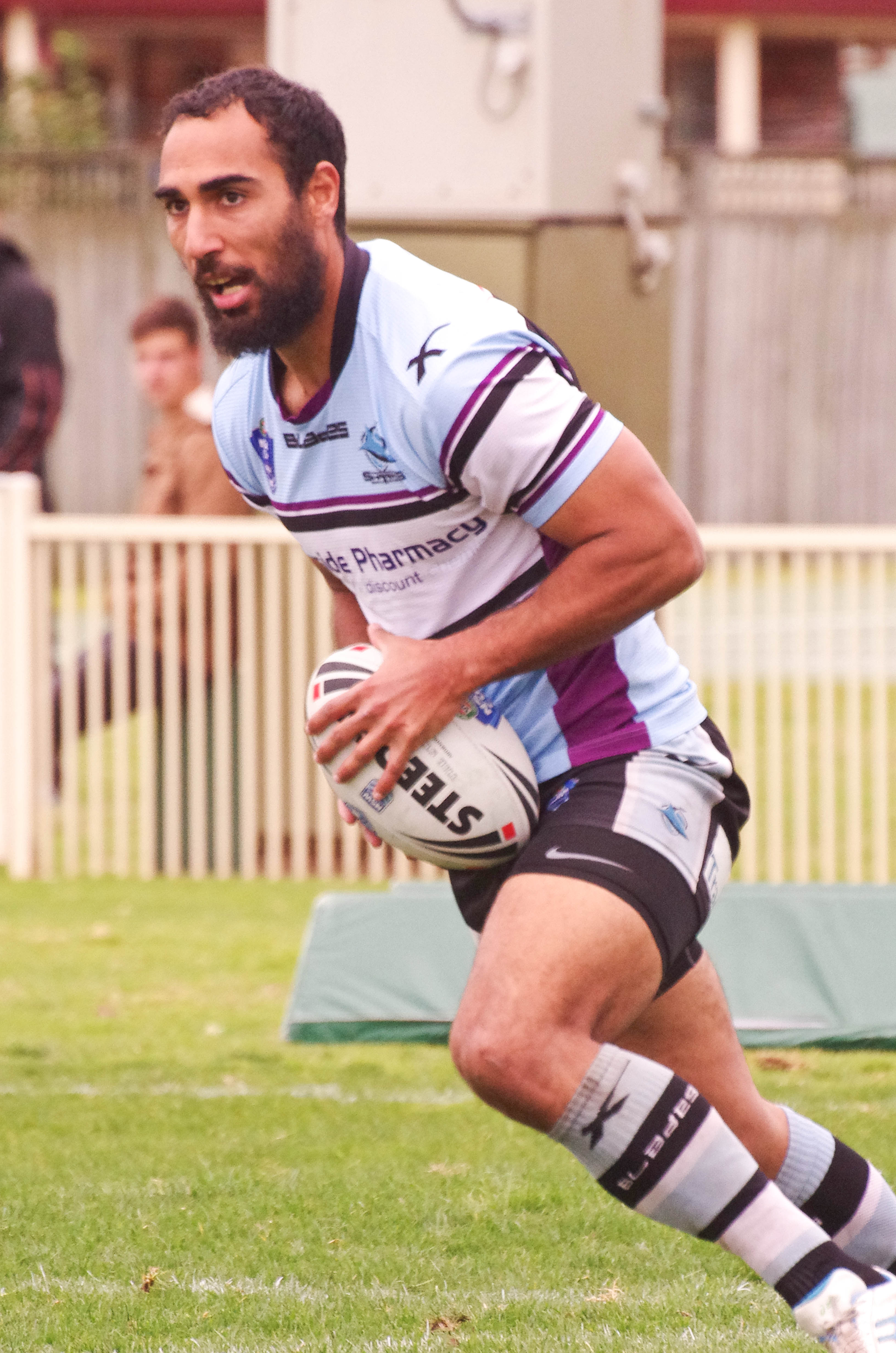
- Robinson in 2014.

Personal information
- Born: 13 June 1987 (age 39) Sydney, New South Wales, Australia
- Height: 185 cm (6 ft 1 in)
- Weight: 92 kg (14 st 7 lb)

Playing information
- Position: Centre, Wing
Club
Years	Team	Pld	T	G	FG	P
2012–13	Penrith Panthers	9	6	0	0	24
Representative
Years	Team	Pld	T	G	FG	P
2009–17	Lebanon	8	13	0	0	52
2019–	Lebanon 9s	3	2	0	0	8
- Source: As of 20 October 2019
- Relatives: Reece Robinson (brother); Beau Champion (step-brother); Nathan Merritt (cousin)

Travis Robinson (born 13 June 1987) is a Lebanon international rugby league footballer who plays as a centre and wing for the Newtown Jets in the Intrust Super Premiership NSW. He previously played for the Penrith Panthers in the National Rugby League. He is the twin brother of New South Wales Waratahs player and fellow Lebanese international Reece Robinson.

== Background ==
He was born in Sydney, New South Wales, Australia. Robinson is of Lebanese and Indigenous Australian descent and played his junior rugby league for the Alexandria Rovers, before being signed by the Cronulla-Sutherland Sharks.

== Playing career ==
In 2006, Robinson joined the Cronulla-Sutherland Sharks. He played for the Sharks' Premier League reserve-grade team from 2006 to 2008 before being signed by the Chester Hill Rhinos in the Jim Beam Cup. He played for them in 2009 before they folded, he then joined the Penrith Panthers. He played for the Panthers' NSW Cup reserve-grade team from 2009 to 2012.

In Round 22 of the 2012 NRL season, Robinson made his NRL debut for Penrith in their 46–6 loss against the Melbourne Storm at AAMI Park. Robinson scored his first NRL career try in his second game in round 24 against the New Zealand Warriors at Mt Smart Stadium.

In 2013, Robinson signed a two-year contract with Melbourne. After the 2015 NRL season, Robinson was released by Melbourne outfit.

== Representative career ==
In 2009, Robinson played for Lebanon in the 2009 European Cup. In October 2015, he returned to the Lebanon side in the World Cup Qualifiers against South Africa.

== Family ==
Robinson's twin brother Reece Robinson plays for the New South Wales Waratahs and he is also related to boxer Anthony Mundine and former South Sydney Rabbitohs player Nathan Merritt.
