= Toufic El Hajj =

Lebanon international rugby league footballer

Personal information
- Full name: Toufic El Hajj
- Height: 185 cm (6 ft 1 in)
- Weight: 100 kg (220 lb; 15 st 10 lb)

Playing information
- Position: Prop
Representative
Years	Team	Pld	T	G	FG	P
2019–	Lebanon	2	0	0	0	0
- Source: As of 24 October 2022

Toufic El Hajj is a Lebanon international rugby league footballer who plays as a prop for the American University of Beirut in the Lebanon Rugby League Championship.

== Career ==
El Hajj made his international debut for Lebanon in their 56-14 defeat by Fiji in the 2019 Pacific Test.
