= Reece Robinson =

Lebanon international rugby league footballer

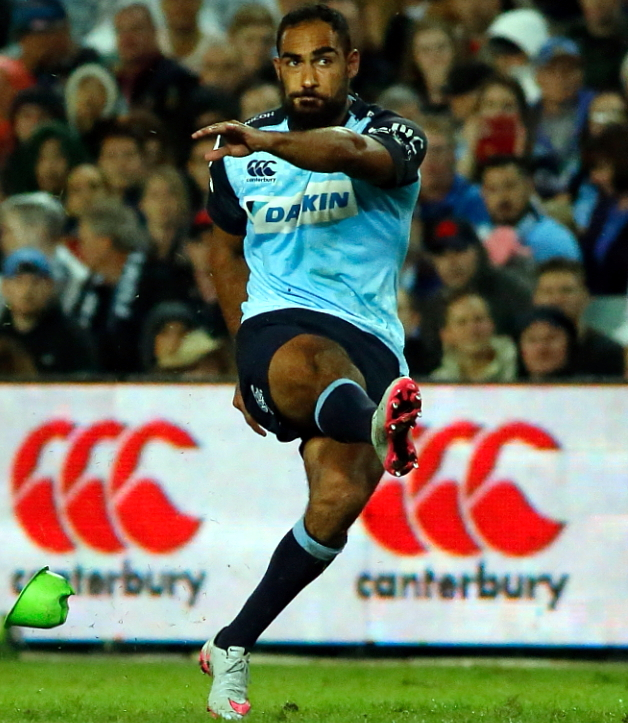

Personal information
- Born: 13 June 1987 (age 39) Sydney, New South Wales, Australia
- Height: 180 cm (5 ft 11 in)
- Weight: 91 kg (14 st 5 lb)

Playing information

Rugby league
- Position: Wing, Fullback
Club
Years	Team	Pld	T	G	FG	P
2008	Brisbane Broncos	13	4	0	0	16
2010–14	Canberra Raiders	83	44	3	0	182
2015	Parramatta Eels	20	9	10	0	56
2018	Sydney Roosters	4	1	0	0	4
	Total	120	58	13	0	258
Representative
Years	Team	Pld	T	G	FG	P
2009–	Lebanon	9	7	4	0	36
2013	Indigenous All stars	1	3	0	0	12
2019–	Lebanon 9s	3	1	2	0	9

Rugby union
- Position: Wing
Club
Years	Team	Pld	T	G	FG	P
2016–17	NSW Waratahs	20	6	14	0	66
2016-17	Randwick	13	9	0	0	45
2016	NSW Country Eagles	9	7	0	0	42
	Total	42	22	14	0	153
- Source: As of 4 November 2022
- Relatives: Travis Robinson (brother); Beau Champion (step-brother); Nathan Merritt (cousin)

Reece Robinson (born 13 June 1987) is a Lebanese international rugby league footballer who most recently played for the Sydney Roosters in the NRL.

He previously played for the Brisbane Broncos, Canberra Raiders and Parramatta Eels in the National Rugby League and the Indigenous All Stars at representative level. He has previously played rugby union for the New South Wales Waratahs in Super Rugby

== Early life ==
Born in Sydney, New South Wales, Robinson is of Indigenous Australian and Lebanese descent. Robinson played his junior football for the Alexandria Rovers as well playing in the South Sydney Rabbitohs SG Ball team before joining the Brisbane Broncos. Robinson was educated at Randwick Boys High School. He also played Rugby union as a schoolboy.

== Rugby league club career ==
=== Brisbane Broncos (2008) ===
In round 1 of the 2008 NRL season, Robinson made his NRL debut for the Brisbane Broncos against the Penrith Panthers on the wing in the Broncos 48–12 win at Suncorp Stadium. In round 3 against the North Queensland Cowboys, Robinson scored his first NRL career try in the Broncos 36–2 win at Suncorp Stadium. Robinson finished his debut year in the NRL with him playing in 13 matches and scoring four tries. Robinson's contract with the Brisbane Broncos was not renewed for the 2009 season.

=== North Sydney Bears (2009) ===
Robinson was picked up by the North Sydney Bears, the feeder club for the South Sydney Rabbitohs, in the New South Wales Cup in 2009. On 12 December, Robinson was signed by the Canberra Raiders after recommendation from Wayne Bennett starting from 2010. Robinson made 22 appearances for Norths and scored 22 tries.

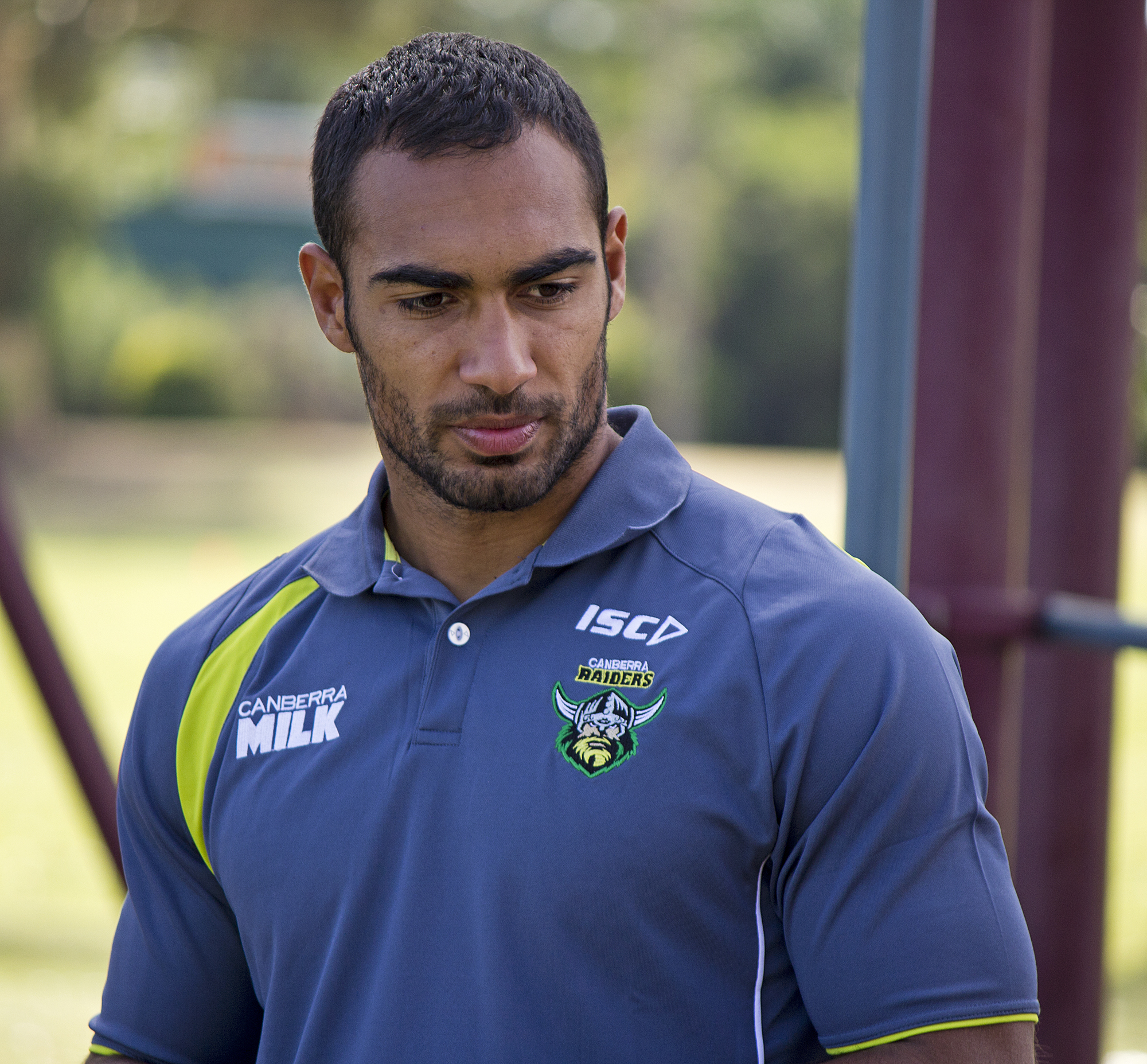
Robinson on duty for the Raiders

=== Canberra Raiders (2010–2014) ===
In round 1 of the 2010 NRL season, Robinson made his club debut for the Canberra Raiders against the Penrith Panthers on the wing in Canberra's 34–16 loss at Penrith Stadium. In Round 25 against the North Queensland Cowboys, Robinson scored an impressive 4 tries in the 48–4 win at Canberra Stadium. Robinson played in five matches and scored five tries for his first season with the club. Robinson played in 14 matches and scored five tries for Canberra in 2011. Robinson finished 2012 as Canberra's top tryscorer with 17 tries in 24 matches.

After incumbent fullback Josh Dugan was sacked from Canberra in March 2013, Robinson replaced him at fullback with some success until he was himself replaced by Anthony Milford. Robinson played in 22 matches, scored seven tries and kicked a goal for Canberra in 2013.

In February, Robinson was selected in the Canberra Raiders inaugural 2014 Auckland Nines squad. Robinson played in 18 matches, scored 10 tries and kicked 2 goals for the Raiders in 2014. On 15 October 2014, Robinson signed a one-year deal with the Parramatta Eels to be a candidate to replace the departed Eels fullback Jarryd Hayne.

=== Parramatta Eels (2015) ===
In January, Robinson played for the Parramatta Eels in the 2015 NRL Auckland Nines. In round 1, Robinson made his club debut for Parramatta against the Manly-Warringah Sea Eagles on the wing, kicking seven goals in their 42–12 win at Parramatta Stadium. In round 3 against the New Zealand Warriors, Robinson scored his first club try for Parramatta in the 29–16 loss at Mt Smart Stadium.

=== Sydney Roosters ===
On 7 December 2017, it was revealed that Robinson had signed a one-year deal to join the Sydney Roosters. In round 5 of the 2018 NRL season, Robinson scored his first club try just 13 seconds left before full-time siren for the Sydney Roosters in a 28-10 win at Southern Cross Group Stadium. The Sydney Roosters went on to win the Minor Premiership and Grand Final in 2018. On 31 October 2018, Robinson was announced as one of the players that was released by the club after not being offered a new contract.

=== Queanbeyan Kangaroos ===
In 2019, Robinson played for the Queanbeyan Kangaroos in the Canberra Raiders Cup competition.

== Rugby league representative career ==
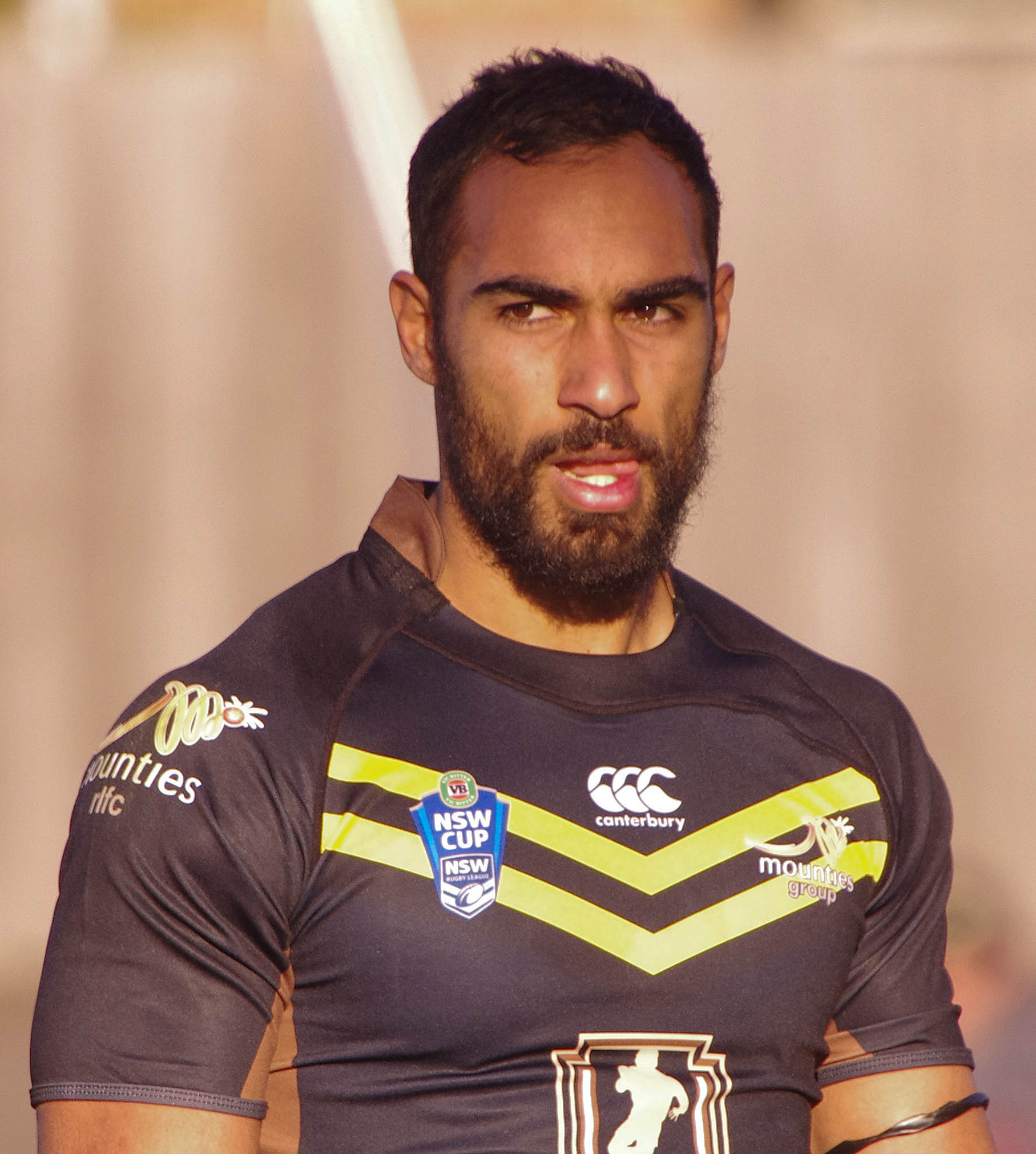
Robinson in 2014

Robinson played for the Lebanon national rugby league team in the 2009 European Cup, scoring a hat-trick of tries in an 86–0 thrashing of Italy.

Robinson played in three matches, scored five tries and kicked four goals in the tournament. On 9 February 2013, Robinson starred on the wing for the Indigenous All Stars scoring a second half hat trick in the 32–6 win against the NRL All Stars at Suncorp Stadium.

Robinson was chosen to represent Lebanon again in the 2017 Rugby League World Cup but withdrew due to injury. Robinson represented Lebanon at the 2021 Rugby League World Cup playing in all four games and scoring two tries.

== Rugby union career ==
On 15 October 2015, Robinson switched codes to Rugby union, signing a 2-year contract with Super Rugby side New South Wales Waratahs. He played in the 2016 National Rugby Championship for New South Wales Country Eagles, winning the Minor Championship and runners up in the Grand Final.

== Personal life ==
Robinson has a twin brother, Travis Robinson, who was contracted to the Melbourne Storm and a member of the Lebanon national rugby league team. Robinson is also a relative of Australian boxer Anthony Mundine, former professional rugby league footballer Nathan Merritt and is step brothers with ex-South Sydney player Beau Champion.
