= Chris Saab =

Lebanon international rugby league footballer

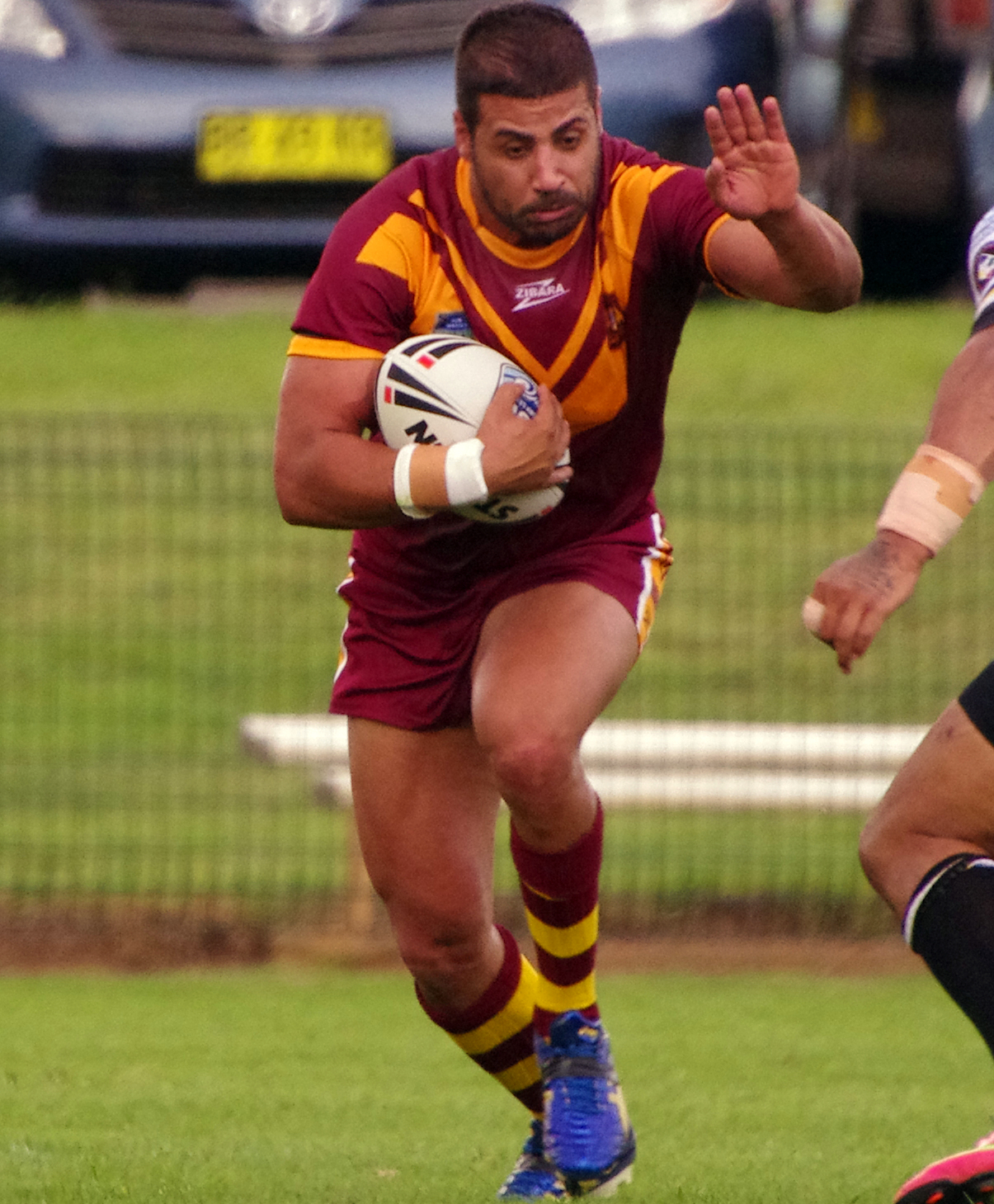

Personal information
- Full name: Christopher Saab
- Born: 22 December 1981 (age 43)

Playing information
- Height: 184 cm (6 ft 0 in)
- Weight: 97 kg (15 st 4 lb)
- Position: Second-row
Representative
Years	Team	Pld	T	G	FG	P
2002–17	Lebanon	15	3	0	0	12

Christopher Saab (born 22 December 1981) is a Lebanese international former rugby league footballer who played as a second-row forward. He represented Lebanon at the 2017 Rugby League World Cup.

== Playing career ==
Saab played junior rugby league for St Johns Lakemba. He played S. G. Ball Cup for the St. George Dragons and Jersey Flegg Cup for the Sydney Roosters.

During his senior career, he played for the Roosters, the South Sydney Rabbitohs, and the North Sydney Bears in the Premier League; Mounties, the Sydney Bulls, and the Guildford Owls in the Ron Massey Cup; and also one season for the Cessnock Goannas in Newcastle.

=== Representative career ===
Saab met and became close friends with Robbie Farah in 2002, making their debut for Lebanon together in a one-off match against France.

Saab was named at second-row in Lebanon's opening game of the 2017 World Cup, also against France, but was ruled out after sustaining a concussion during the warm-up. He retired at the end of the tournament with a total of 15 caps for Lebanon.
