= Mark Daoud =

Lebanon international rugby league player

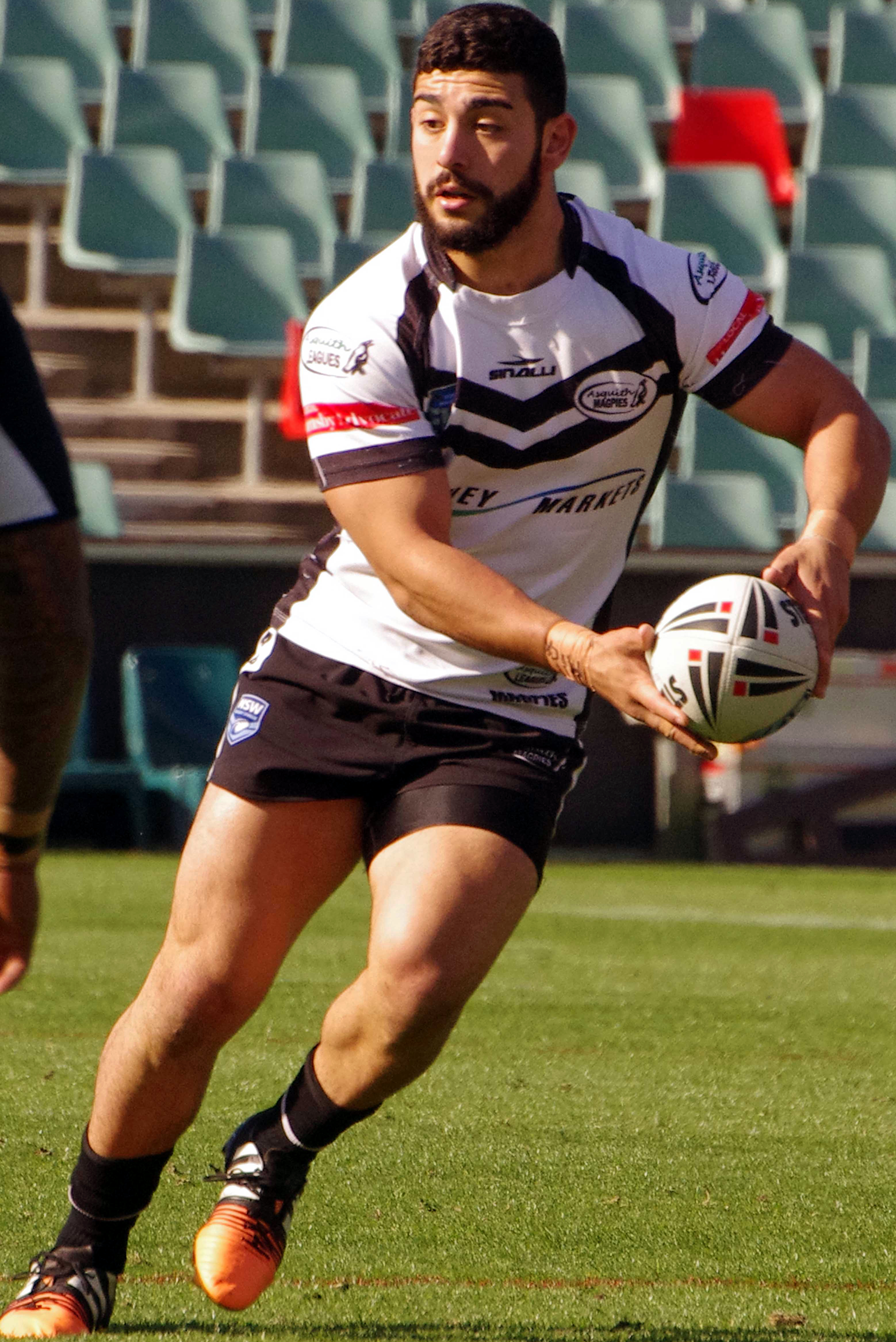

Personal information
- Full name: Mark Daoud

Playing information
Representative
Years	Team	Pld	T	G	FG	P
	Lebanon
- Source: As of 29 September 2016

Mark Daoud is a Lebanese professional rugby league footballer who has played for the Parramatta Eels in the New South Wales Cup.

Daoud also played 1 match for The North Sydney Bears in The NSW Cup. Daoud currently plays for The Asquith Magpies.
