= Ray Moujalli =

Former Lebanon international rugby league footballer

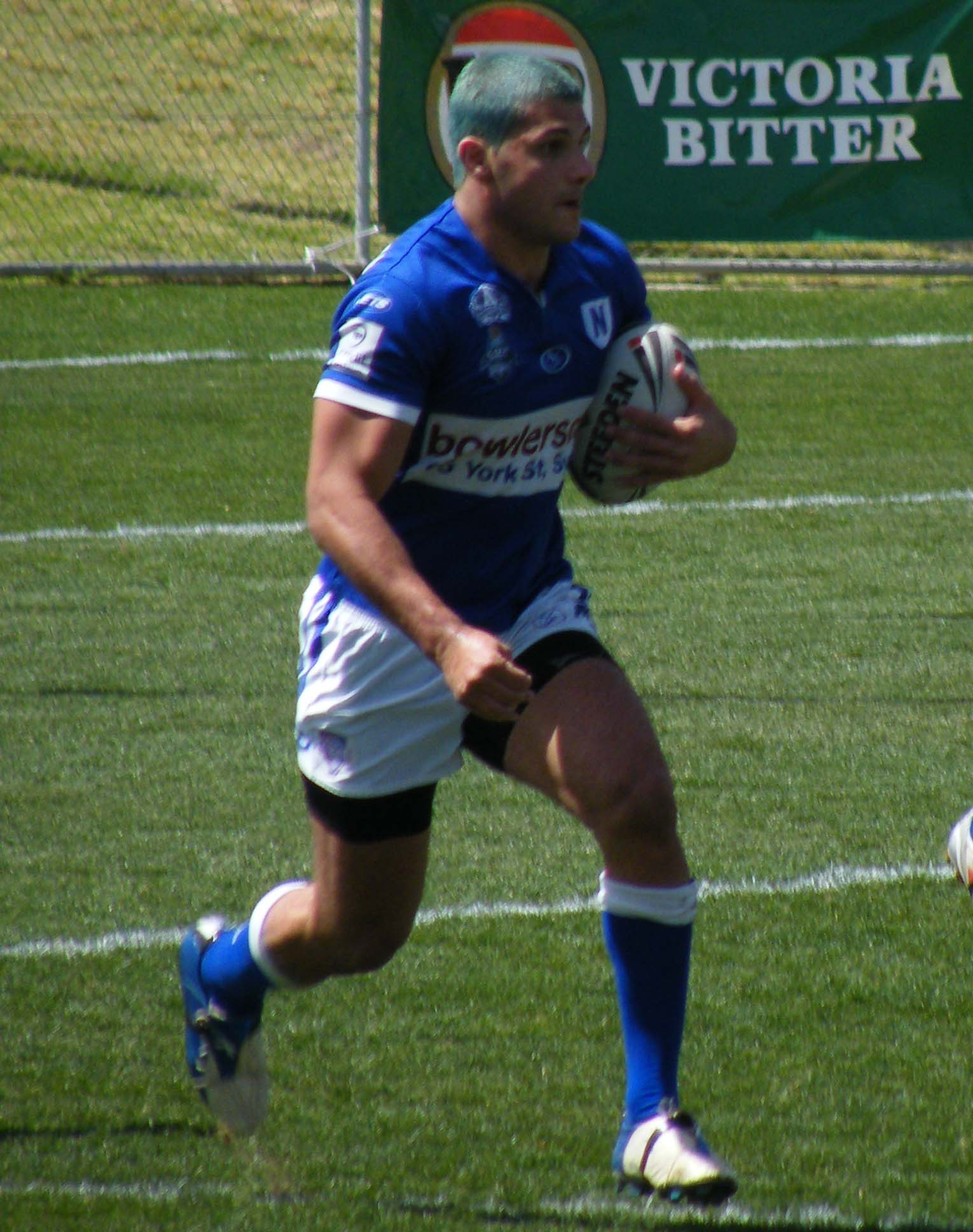
- Ray Moujalli playing for the Newtown Jets

Personal information
- Born: 20 December 1984 (age 41) Sydney, Australia
- Height: 187 cm (6 ft 2 in)
- Weight: 107 kg (16 st 12 lb)

Playing information
- Position: Prop
Club
Years	Team	Pld	T	G	FG	P
2009	Sydney Roosters	1	0	0	0	0
Representative
Years	Team	Pld	T	G	FG	P
2003–15	Lebanon	11	5	0	0	20
- Source: As of 25 October 2015

Ray Moujalli (born 20 December 1984) is a former Lebanon international rugby league footballer who most recently played for the Canterbury-Bankstown Bulldogs as a prop in the NSW Cup competition.

== Background ==
He was born in Sydney, Australia.

== Playing career ==
Moujalli made his NRL debut in round 15 2009 for the Sydney Roosters, against the North Queensland Cowboys.

Between 2009 and 2015 Moujalli played over 100 games for Newtown.

Moujalli signed with Canterbury after six seasons with Newtown for the start of the 2017 Intrust Super Premiership season. At the beginning of the season he was announced as captain for the year. . Moujalli represented Lebanon at The 2017 rugby league world cup. Following the tournament, Moujalli retired as a professional rugby league footballer and now works as Canterbury's strength and conditioning coach.
