= Darren Maroon =

Former Lebanon international rugby league footballer

Personal information
- Full name: Darren Maroon
- Born: 4 May 1966 (age 59) Sydney, New South Wales, Australia

Playing information
- Position: Second-row, Prop
Club
Years	Team	Pld	T	G	FG	P
1987–92	South Sydney	52	2	0	0	8
1993	Manly-Warringah	1	0	0	0	0
1994	South Sydney	6	0	0	0	0
1995–96	Eastern Suburbs	2	0	0	0	0
	Total	61	2	0	0	8
Representative
Years	Team	Pld	T	G	FG	P
1999–00	Lebanon	4	0	0	0	0

Coaching information
Representative
Years	Team	Gms	W	D	L	W%
2006–07	Lebanon	7	4	2	1	57
2014–15	Lebanon	4	3	0	1	75
- Source: As of 7 February 2021

Darren Maroon (born 4 May 1966) is a former Lebanon international rugby league footballer who represented Lebanon at the 2000 World Cup.

== Background ==
Maroon was born in Sydney, New South Wales, Australia.

== Playing career ==
Maroon started his career with the South Sydney Rabbitohs, playing in 52 games between 1987 and 1992. He then spent 1993 with the Manly-Warringah Sea Eagles, but played only one match in first-grade before returning to the South Sydney club. Maroon played for Souths in their upset 1994 Tooheys Challenge Cup final victory over Brisbane.

In 1995 and 1996, he was part of the Sydney City Roosters, but again played only one first-grade match in each season.

Maroon then joined the Sydney Bulls in the Metropolitan Cup. In 1999, he played for Lebanon and helped them qualify for the 2000 World Cup.

Maroon was selected as Lebanon's captain for the 2000 World Cup. However, before the tournament started, Maroon failed a drugs test. He was later cleared to play when a tribunal ruled that he took the banned substance unwittingly in a sports drink. Maroon played three matches at the World Cup.

== Coaching ==
Darren was coach of the Lebanon team that beat Wales 26–50 in Widnes on 9 Nov 2007.

In 2011 Maroon coached the Sydney Bulls in the Bundaberg Red Cup.

In his second spell as Lebanon coach he lost just one game; 28-40 v Fiji on 19 Oct 2014, played in Sydney.
