= Auburn Warriors =

Defunct Australian rugby league club, based in Auburn, NSW

Club information
- Full name: Auburn Warriors Rugby League Football Club
- Nickname: The Warriors
- Colours: Teal; Black; Purple
- Founded: 1953; 73 years ago
- Exited: 2018; 8 years ago

Former details
- Ground: Lidcombe Oval
- Coach: Darren Maroon
- Competition: Ron Massey Cup; Canterbury Bankstown District Rugby League
- Current season

The Auburn Warriors Rugby League Football Club were an Australian rugby league football club based in Auburn, New South Wales formed in 1953. They played in the NSW Ron Massey Cup competition and in Sydney's A-Grade competitions.

== 2017 ==
In The 2017 Ron Massey Cup season, Auburn qualified for their first grand final in the competition. On 24 September, Auburn played against Wentworthville in the final and lost the match 38-4.

== 2018 ==
On 14 February 2018, it was revealed that Auburn Warriors Rugby League Club had been forced to fold due to a failed sponsorship deal involving former deputy Auburn mayor Salim Mehajer. Mehajer had promised the club a payment of $100,000 but the amount was never paid. Auburn Warriors president Fedi Sleiman said "He didn't pay us. He didn't pay a cent, "We don't have a leagues club, we don't have the backing of anyone else, When he comes up with nothing, there's nothing we can do. We can't keep going". As a result The NSWRL confirmed the Warriors wouldn't be taking part in the Ron Massey Cup for 2018. Sleiman hopes a white knight sponsor would emerge to enable the Warriors to return to the Ron Massey Cup in 2019.

== Honours ==
- Ron Massey Cup
  - Runners Up (1) – 2017

== Notable players ==
- Matt Utai (2002-13 Canterbury Bulldogs & Wests Tigers)
- Heka Nanai (2007-10 Canterbury Bulldogs)
- Khalid Deeb (2009 Sydney Roosters)
- Omar Slaimankhel (2015-2016 Sydney Roosters)

== See also ==
- List of rugby league clubs in Australia
