= 2013 Rugby League World Cup qualification – Europe =

The 2013 Rugby League World Cup Europe qualification is a rugby league tournament that was held in October 2011 to decide the European qualification for the 2013 Rugby League World Cup. It consisted of a round-robin play-off involving four teams; Russia, Italy, Serbia and Lebanon. Both Italy and Lebanon remained unbeaten, recording two wins and a draw each. However, Italy topped the group as a result of points difference and therefore qualified for the World Cup.

== Standings ==
Team	Pld	W	D	L	PF	PA	+/−	Pts
Italy	3	2	1	0	163	31	+132	5
Lebanon	3	2	1	0	147	23	+124	5
Russia	3	1	0	2	42	152	−110	2
Serbia	3	0	0	3	38	184	−146	0

== Italy vs Russia ==
15 October 2011

Italy	92–6	Russia
Tries: Mantellato (2), D. Nasso (2), Falcone (2), Ghietti (2), Parrata, Sands, Ciraldo, Riethmuller, Vicelich, Quitadamo, R.Nasso, Lennarduzzi; Conv: Mantellato (14)	(Report)	Try: Nikolaev; Conv: Lysokon

Stadio Plebiscito, Padova
Attendance: 2,100

FB	1	Anthony Minichiello (c)
RW	2	Christophe Calegari
RC	3	Dom Nasso
LC	4	Matt Parrata
LW	5	Josh Mantellato
SO	6	Ben Falcone
SH	7	Ryan Ghietti
PR	8	Alex Ranieri
HK	9	Ray Nasso
PR	10	Ryan Tramonte
SR	11	Cameron Ciraldo
SR	12	Joel Riethmuller
LF	13	Rob Quitadamo
Substitutions:
IC	14	Dean Vicelich
IC	15	Cederic Prizzon
IC	16	Matthew Sands
IC	17	Rhys Lennarduzzi
Coach:

FB	1	Maksim Suchkov
RW	2	Petr Botnarash
RC	3	Andrey Zdobnikov
LC	4	Mikhail Burlutskiy
LW	5	Rustam Bulanov
FE	6	Aleksander Lysokon (c)
HB	7	Eduard Ososkov
PR	8	Sergey Konstantinov
HK	9	Vladimir Vlasyuk
PR	10	Ilgiz Galimov
SR	11	Alexey Nikolaev
SR	12	Grigory Esin
LK	13	Vadim Fedchuk
Substitutions:
IC	14	Sergey Gaponov
IC	15	Igor Chuprin
IC	16	Vladimir Gotsulyak
IC	17	Artem Grigoryan
Coach:

== Lebanon vs Serbia ==
16 October 2011

Lebanon	96–4	Serbia
Tries: Clark (3), Saleh (3), Barakat (3), Nye (2), Boustani (2), Deeb, Kassis, Adham El Zabedieh, Adnan El Zabedieh; Conv: Couri (13), Ballout	(Report)	Try: Nedic

International Olympic Stadium, Tripoli

FB	1	Adnan Saleh
RW	2	Adnan El Zabedieh
RC	3	Danny Barakat
LC	4	Adham El Zabedieh
LW	5	Clifton Nye
SO	6	James Boustani
SH	7	Nadim Couri
PR	8	Khaled Deeb (c)
HK	9	Jamie Clark
PR	10	Allen Soultan
SR	11	Ahmed Ellaz
SR	12	Steve Azzi
LF	13	Ray Moujalli
Substitutions:
IC	14	Ali Kourouche
IC	15	Nick Kassis
IC	16	Ibrahim Ballout
IC	17	Robin Hachache
Coach:

FB	1	Ivan Šušnjara
RW	2	Vladan Kikanović
RC	3	Miloš Ćalić
LC	4	Aleksandar Aleksić
LW	5	Nebojša Živanović
FE	6	Adam Nedić
HB	7	Dalibor Vukanović
PR	8	Ilija Radan
HK	9	Nikša Unković
PR	10	Lazar Živković
SR	11	Stefan Nedeljković
SR	12	Soni Radovanović
LK	13	Austen Novaković
Substitutions:
IC	14	Dejan Lukenić
IC	15	Danilo Delić
IC	16	Zoran Pešić
IC	17	Milan Šušnjara
Coach:

== Russia vs Lebanon ==
22 October 2011

Russia	0–32	Lebanon
	(Report)	Tries: Barakat (2), Azzi, Kassis, Adham El Zabedieh, Nye; Conv: Couri (3), Boustani

Vereya Stadium, Vereya

FB	1	Maksim Suchkov
RW	2	Mikhail Burlutskiy
RC	3	Petr Botnarash
LC	4	Vadim Fedchuk
LW	5	Rustam Bulanov
SO	6	Aleksandr Lysokon (c)
SH	7	Eduard Ososkov
PR	8	Sergei Konstantinov
HK	9	Vladimir Vlasyuk
PR	10	Ilgiz Galimov
SR	11	Alexey Nikolaev
SR	12	Grigory Esin
LF	13	Sergey Gaponov
Substitutions:
IC	14	Igor Chuprin
IC	15	Anatoly Grigorev
IC	16	Vladimir Odnosumov
IC	17	Artem Grigoryan
Coach:
(England) John Stankevitch

FB	1	Clifton Nye
RW	2	Adnan El Zabedieh
RC	3	Danny Barakat
LC	4	Danny Chiha
LW	5	Adham El Zabedieh
FE	6	James Boustani
HB	7	Nadim Couri
PR	8	Charlie Farah
HK	9	Jamie Clark
PR	10	Khaled Deeb
SR	11	Nick Kassis
SR	12	Steve Azzi
LK	13	Ray Moujalli
Substitutions:
IC	14	Walid Yassine
IC	15	Ibrahim Ballout
IC	16	Chris Saab
IC	17	Robin Hachache
Coach:
(Lebanon) David Bayssari

== Serbia vs Italy ==
23 October 2011

Serbia	6–52	Italy
Try: Pesic; Conv: Nedic	(Report)	Tries: Minichiello (3), Lenarduzzi (2), Mantellato, Riethmuller, Parrata, D. Nasso; Conv: Mantellato (8)

Makiš Stadium, Belgrade

FB	1
RW	2
RC	3
LC	4
LW	5
SO	6
SH	7
PR	8
HK	9
PR	10
SR	11
SR	12
LF	13
Substitutions:
IC	14
IC	15
IC	16
IC	17
Coach:

FB	1
RW	2
RC	3
LC	4
LW	5
FE	6
HB	7
PR	8
HK	9
PR	10
SR	11
SR	12
LK	13
Substitutions:
IC	14
IC	15
IC	16
IC	17
Coach:

== Serbia vs Russia ==
29 October 2011

Serbia	28–36	Russia
Tries: Pesic, Nedic, Susnjara, Radan, Novakovic; Conv: Nedic (4)	(Report)	Tries: Botnarash (3), Volkov, Esin, Ososkov; Conv: Lysokon (6)

Makiš Stadium, Belgrade

FB	1
RW	2
RC	3
LC	4
LW	5
SO	6
SH	7
PR	8
HK	9
PR	10
SR	11
SR	12
LF	13
Substitutions:
IC	14
IC	15
IC	16
IC	17
Coach:

FB	1
RW	2
RC	3
LC	4
LW	5
FE	6
HB	7
PR	8
HK	9
PR	10
SR	11
SR	12
LK	13
Substitutions:
IC	14
IC	15
IC	16
IC	17
Coach:

== Italy vs Lebanon ==
29 October 2011

Italy	19–19	Lebanon
Tries: Falcone, Stewart, Mantellato; Conv: Mantellato (3); DG: Ghietti	(Report)	Tries: El Zabedieh, Moujalli, Boustani; Conv: Couri (3); DG: Couri

Makiš Stadium, Belgrade

FB	1
RW	2
RC	3
LC	4
LW	5
SO	6
SH	7
PR	8
HK	9
PR	10
SR	11
SR	12
LF	13
Substitutions:
IC	14
IC	15
IC	16
IC	17
Coach:

FB	1
RW	2
RC	3
LC	4
LW	5
FE	6
HB	7
PR	8
HK	9
PR	10
SR	11
SR	12
LK	13
Substitutions:
IC	14
IC	15
IC	16
IC	17
Coach:

Coached by Carlo Napolitano and captained by Anthony Minichiello, Italy's draw with Lebanon was enough for them to gain the 14th and final place in the 2013 World Cup.

== Squads ==
=== Italy ===
The Italy squad as of 22 September 2011 is as follows:

- Coach: (Italy) Carlo Napolitano

Club Team	Players
(England) Harlequins RL	Craig Gower
(Italy) Grifons Padova	Matthew Sands, Giacomo Simioni
(France) Lézignan Sangliers	Christophe Calegari
(Australia) Manly Sea Eagles	Vic Mauro
(Australia) Monto	Dom Nasso
(Australia) Mount Isa	Matt Parrata
(Australia) Newcastle Knights	Cameron Ciraldo
(Australia) Northern Pride RLFC	Ryan Ghetti
(Australia) North Queensland Cowboys	Joel Riethmuller
(Australia) North Sydney Bears	Alex Ranieri
(France) Saint-Gaudens Bears	Jean Christophe Borlin
(Australia) St Patricks Blacktown	Ryan Tramonte
(Australia) Sydney Roosters	Anthony Minichiello (C)
(France) Villefranche de Rouergue	Ray Nasso, Cederic Prizzon
(Australia) Wentworth	Ben Falcone
(Australia) Western Suburbs Magpies	Rocky Trimarchi, Rhys Lennarduzzi
(Australia) Windsor Wolves	Ben Stewart
(Italy) XIII del Ducato	Juan Pablo Carrara, Fabrizio Ciaurro, Thomas Covati, Giovanni Franchi, Romain Pavoni, Dean Vicelich, Santiago Monteagudo, Rob Quitadamo
(Australia) Wyong	Josh Mantellato
(England) West Bowling	Jonathan Marcinzack

=== Lebanon ===
The Lebanon squad as at 22 September 2011 is as follows:

- Coach: (Lebanon) David Bayssari

Club Team	Players
(Lebanon) Balamand	Allen Soultan, Samer Nehme
(Australia) Cabramatta Two Blues	Nick Kassis
(Australia) Canterbury Bulldogs	Steve Azzi
(Australia) Cronulla Sharks	Jon Mannah
(Lebanon) Jounieh RLFC	Youssef El Helou
(Australia) Kingsgrove colts	Kamel Ahmed
(Lebanon) Immortals RLFC	Ibrahim Ballout, Robin Hachache, Rudy Hachache, Walid Yassine
(Australia) Manly Sea Eagles	Ray Moujalli
(Australia) Mounties	George Azzi, Adham El Zabedieh, Adnan El Zabedieh
(Australia) Narrabeen	Charlie Farah
(Australia) Newtown Jets	Jamie Clark, Khalid Deeb, Ahmad Ellaz
(Australia) St John's Eagles	Danny Barakat, Daniel Chiha, Nadim Couri, Ali Kourouche, Chris Saab, Adnan Saleh
(Australia) Wentworthville Magpies	Cliff Nye, James Boustani
(Lebanon) Wolves RLFC	Monir Finan, Ray Finan, Nemer Saliba

=== Russia ===
The Russia squad as at 22 September 2011 is as follows:

- Coach: (Russia) Eduard Ososkov

Club Team	Players
(Russia) Dinamo	Andrey Zdobnikov
(Russia) Nevskaya Zastava	Grigory Esin
(Russia) RBK	Valentin Baskakov, Artyom Grigoryan, Ruslan Izmaylov, Sergey Matveev, Denis Nikolskiy, Vladimir Odnosumov
(Russia) Storm	Igor Chuprin, Vadim Fedchuk, Vladimir Gotsulyak, Alexey Volkov
(Russia) RC Vereya	Petr Botnarash, Rustam Bulanov, Mikhail Burlutskuy, Ilgiz Galimov, Sergey Gapinov, Anatoly Grigoriev, Sergey Konstantinov, Aleksander Lysokon, Alexey Nikolaev, Eduard Ososkov, Roman Safronov, Andrey Sevostyanov, Maksim Suchkov, Vladimir Vlasyuk

=== Serbia ===
The Serbia squad was named on 22 September.

- Coach: (Serbia) Marko Janković

Club Team	Players
(Australia) Belconnen United Scholars	Adam Nedić
(Serbia) Car Lazar	Nenad Radević, Aleksandar Sič, Miloš Zogović
(Serbia) Dorćol Spiders	Danilo Delić, Vladan Kikanović, Dejan Lukenić, Stefan Nedeljković, Stefan Nikolić, Stevan Stevanović, Ivan Šušnjara, Milan Šušnjara, Vuk Tvrdišić, Nikša Unković, Dalibor Vukanović (C)
(England) Hemel Hempstead RLFC	Ilija Radan
(Serbia) Hammers Niš	Marko Milenković, Lazar Živković
(France) RC Lescure	Soni Radovanovic
(England) Oldham R.L.F.C.	Austen Novaković
(Serbia) Radnički Nova Pazova	Nemanja Cojić, Pero Madžarević, Radovan Tajsić, Slaviša Zekić
(Serbia) Red Star Belgrade	Miloš Ćalić, Ivan Djordjević, Zoran Pešić, Nebojša Živanović
(Serbia) Stari Grad	Aleksandar Aleksić, Mirko Božović
