= 2009 Rugby League European Cup =

- Number of teams: 6
- Winner: Wales (5th title)
- Matches played: 9
- Top scorer: (Scotland) Mick Nanyn (46)
- Top try scorers: (Ireland) Karl Fitzpatrick (4) (Scotland) James Nixon (4)

The 2009 Rugby League European Cup, known as the rugbyleague.com European Cup due to sponsorship, was a rugby league football tournament.

The revamped Rugby League European Cup 2009 involved six teams competing in two groups of three. Participating teams were: Ireland, Scotland, Wales, Serbia, Lebanon and Italy. Russia were scheduled to take part in the competition, but were forced to pull out due to board restructuring within the Russian Rugby League Federation. They were replaced by the RLEF European Shield winners, Italy.

== Squads ==
=== Lebanon ===
Coach: (Lebanon) John Elias

Club Team	Players
Canterbury Bulldogs	Liam Ayoub and Jamie Clarke
Sydney Roosters	Steven Azzi
Bankstown City	Danny Barakat, Adnan Saleh and Chris Salem (Captain)
Windsor Wolves	Danny Chiha and Wael Harb
Jounieh RLFC	Ghassan Dandach and Youssef El Helou
Newtown Jets	Khaled Deeb
Cronulla Sharks	Ahmad Ellaz
LAU	Robin Hachache and Jad Hashem
Wentworthville Magpies	John Koborsi
South Sydney Rabbitohs	Josh Mansour
Newcastle Knights	George Ndaira
North Sydney Bears	Reece Robinson
Chester Hill Rhinos	Travis Robinson
Western Suburbs Magpies	Allen Soultan

- Hazem El Masri was no longer available after retiring from the sport.
- Robbie Farah was unavailable due to being named in Australia's Four Nations squad.
- Charlie Farah, Anthony Farah, Nathan Dib and Jarrod Saffy were all injury withdrawals.

=== Wales ===
Coach: (Wales) Iestyn Harris (Crusaders Rugby League)

Club Team	Players
Gateshead Thunder	Matt Barron
Celtic Crusaders	Ashley Bateman, Chris Beasley, Neil Budworth, Geraint Davies, Gil Dudson, Ben Flower (Captain), Jordan James, Elliot Kear, Lewis Mills, Ross Wardle, Lloyd White and Lee Williams
Featherstone Rovers	Ross Divorty
Leeds Met University	Rhys Griffiths
Bridgend Blue Bulls	Christian Roets
London Skolars	Matt Thomas
Leigh Centurions	Ian Watson
Central Comets	Ian Webster
Warrington Wolves	Rhys Williams

- Anthony Blackwood (Celtic Crusaders), Ben Evans (Warrington Wolves), Rhys Evans (Warrington Wolves) and Craig Kopczak (Bradford Bulls) were put on a four-man stand-by list that was used in case of injuries.
- Notable omissions included Glenn Morrison, David Mills and James Evans.

=== Serbia ===
Coach: (New Zealand) Gerard Stokes (Whitehaven)

Club Team	Players
Whitehaven	Soni Radovanovic (Captain)
RK Dorćol	Dalibor Vukanović, Stevan Stevanović, Milan Šušnjara, Vladan Kikanović, Dejan Lukenić, Nikša Unković, Dimitris Dajč, Filip Brkić
R13K Podbara	Mario Milosavljević, Nenad Grbić, Zoran Pešić and Marko Žebeljan
Oldham R.L.F.C.	Austen Novaković
Souths Sunnybank	Milan Radojević
RK Beogradski Univerzitet	Ivan Šušnjara
R13K Niš	Aleksandar Sič
RLK Crvena Zvezda	Ivan Djordjević

Konstantin Putkin Unattached - Rugby Union

=== Scotland ===
Coach: (England) Steve McCormack

Club Team	Players
Barrow Raiders	James Nixon
Featherstone Rovers	Jon Steel
Doncaster	Dean Colton
Wakefield Trinity Wildcats	Kevin Henderson
Leigh Centurions	Mick Nanyn
Widnes Vikings	Lee Paterson, John Duffy and Iain Morrison
York City Knights	Gareth Moore
Huddersfield Giants	Paul Jackson
Sheffield Eagles	Mitch Stringer, Alex Szostak, Jack Howieson and Brendon Lindsay
Hunslet Hawks	Neil Lowe
Hull Kingston Rovers	Ben Fisher (Captain) and Rhys Lovegrove
Gateshead Thunder	Andrew Henderson, Mark Dack, Dave Vernon and Crawford Mathews
Whitehaven	Dexter Miller
Workington Town	Rob Lunt, Paddy Coupar and Dave Arnott
Edinburgh Eagles	John Cox
Castleford Panthers	Jamie Benn

=== Ireland ===
Coach: (England) Andy Kelly

Club Team	Players
Barrow Raiders	Liam Harrison and Dave Allen
Wakefield Trinity Wildcats	Scott Grix (Captain)
Halifax	Bob Beswick
Salford City Reds	Karl Fitzpatrick
Dewsbury Rams	Liam Finn
Leeds Rhinos	Luke Ambler
Oldham R.L.F.C.	Marcus St Hilaire and Wayne Kerr
Wigan Warriors	Pat Richards and Michael McIlorum
Warrington Wolves	Tyrone McCarthy
Harlequins RL	Jason Golden
York City Knights	Sean Hesketh
Castleford Tigers	Ryan Boyle
Dublin City Exiles	John Coleman
Treaty City Titans	Brendan Guilfoyle
Laois Panthers	Tim Bergin
Carlow Crusaders	Stevie Gibbons and Paddy Barcoe

- Sean Gleeson, Gareth Haggerty and Eamon O'Carroll were not selected through injury.

=== Italy ===
Coach: (Italy) Carlo Napolitano

Club Team	Players
Hinterland Storm	Dominic Brambani
Woodrush RU	Edoardo Lerna
Queensbury	Angelo Ricci
West Bowling	Jonathan Marcinzack
Leeds Akkies	Jason Dubas-Fisher
Avignon XIII	Cyril Armani
Cumbria rugby league	Alex D'aprile
Piemonte XIII	Filippo Maserati and Pier Luigi Gentile
Lyon Villeurbanne	Matthew Sands
Mastini XIII	Mauro Di Maggio, Fabio Berzieri, Daniele Pasqualini, Giovanni Franchi, Filippo Righetto and Matteo Foschi
Nafit XIII	Paul Stanica, Claudio Forte, Nicolino Facco, Daniele Gnata and Ludovico Torreggiani
La Rocca XIII	Filippo Veronese and Andrea Zacchia
Melbourne Storm	Aidan Guerra
Redcliffe Dolphins	Chris Borgese
Paris XIII	Anthony Severin
Gateshead Thunder	Paul Franze
Wests Tigers	Franco Kmet
Unattached	Marco Ferrazzano and Mark Dalle Cort

- Bradford's Chris Nero was forced to withdraw from the Italian squad.

== Group 1 ==
=== Results ===
17 October 2009

Italy	0 - 104	Scotland
	Report	Try: Nixon (4); Steel (2); Henderson (2); Fletcher (2); Benn (2); Nanyn (2); Paterson; Moore; Cox; Fisher; Goal: Nanyn (16)

Stadio Plebiscito, Padova, Italy
Attendance: 2,139
Referee: Steve Ganson (England)

24 October 2009

Lebanon
Tries: T. Robinson (2)
Ellaz
Saleh (4)
Mansour
R. Robinson (3)
Clark, Harb (2)
El Helou

Goals: Ndeira (12)
Clark

86 - 0
Report

Italy

International Olympic Stadium, Tripoli, Lebanon
Attendance: 2,100
Referee: Thierry Alibert (France)

1 November 2009

Scotland	22 - 10	Lebanon
	Report

Hughenden Stadium, Glasgow, Scotland
Attendance: 1,000
Referee: Leon Williamson (New Zealand)

=== Final standings ===
Team	Played	Won	Drew	Lost	For	Against	Diff	Points
Scotland	2	2	0	0	126	10	116	4
Lebanon	2	1	0	1	96	22	74	2
Italy	2	0	0	2	0	190	-190	0

== Group 2 ==
=== Results ===
18 October 2009

Ireland	82 - 0	Serbia
Try: Fitzpatrick (4); Ambler (2); Bergin (2); Coleman; Finn; Allen; Hesketh; Harrison; Guilfoyle; Goal: Finn (9); Hesketh (4)	Report

Spollanstown, Tullamore, Ireland
Attendance: 295
Referee: Leon Williamson (New Zealand)

25 October 2009

Serbia	8 - 88	Wales
Try: Putkin; Goals: Brkic (2)	Report	Tries: Roets (3); James (2); Divorty (2); R. Williams (2); Kear; Thomas; L. Williams; Bateman; Watson; Goals: Webster (14)

FK Smederevo Stadium, Smederevo, Serbia
Attendance: 93
Referee: Shayne Hayne (Australia)

1 November 2009

Wales
Try: Ian Webster
Lee Williams
Rhys Williams
Ashley Bateman
Geraint Davies
Jordan James
Elliot Kear
Gil Dudson

Goal: Lloyd White (5)

42 - 12
Report

Ireland
Try: Marcus St Hilaire
Liam Finn

Goal: Pat Richards (2)

Sardis Road, Pontypridd, Wales
Attendance: 2,143
Referee: Thierry Alibert (France)

=== Final standings ===
Team	Played	Won	Drew	Lost	For	Against	Diff	Points
Wales	2	2	0	0	130	20	110	4
Ireland	2	1	0	1	94	42	52	2
Serbia	2	0	0	2	8	170	-162	0

== Finals ==
=== Championship final ===
08-11-2009

Scotland	16 - 28	Wales
	Report

Brewery Field, Bridgend, Wales
Attendance: 1,608
Referee: Shayne Hayne (Australia)
Player of the Match: Elliot Kear

=== 3rd Place Match ===
08-11-2009

Lebanon
Tries: Saleh (2)

Mansour (9) Travis Robinson (12, 27) Clark (22) Reece Robinson (40, 75) Chiha (48) Goals: Clark (0/2) Reece Robinson (4/5) Travis Robinson (0/1)

40 - 16
Report

Ireland
Tries: Haley (30, 36)

Beswick (64) Goals: Finn 2/3

Brewery Field, Bridgend, Wales
Attendance: 1,608
Referee: Steve Ganson (England)

=== 5th place Match ===
08-11-2009

Italy
Try: Falcone (28, 65, 76)

Vicelich (30, 37, 69) Nasso (39)

Goals: Veronese 7/7

42 - 14
Report

Serbia
Try: Brkić (13)

Vukanović (16, 44)

Goals: Brkić 1/3

Maesteg, Wales
Attendance: TBA
Referee: Phil Bentham (England)

== Sources ==
- 2009 European Cup at rugbyleagueplanet.com
- Ireland VS Serbia 09 Appointment
