= Association of Rugby League Clubs =

- Ассоциация Регбилиг Клубов
- Founded: 15 April 2008
- IRL affiliation: 1948
- RLEF affiliation: 2013 (full member)
- Responsibility: Russia
- Headquarters: Moscow, Russia
- Key people: Denis S. Korolev (Chair); Dmitry Belov (Chief Executive)
- Competitions: National Championship; Moscow Rugby League Conference; Moscow Nines
- Website: rrlf.ru

(Russia)
- As of 14 October 2016

The Association of Rugby League Clubs (Russian: Ассоциация Регбилиг Клубов, romanized: Assotsiatsiya Regbilig Klubov) is the governing body for rugby league in Russia. The association was formed in 2010, bringing together amateur clubs and regional RRLF clubs after the expulsion of the Russian Rugby League Federation and essentially rugby league itself by the Order of the Ministry of Tourism RUSSIA № 21 from State Register of Sports of Russia.

== History ==
After the turmoil of the RRLF losing clubs and players after "the crisis of 2009-2010", Edward Taturian split from the previous body and formed the "Association of Rugby League Clubs" (ARLC). After no clear framework or competition was introduced by the RRLF in 2010, the ARLC conducted regional league of "North-West", "Center" and "South" all originally consisting of 6 teams each. The following year it was inducted into the "SNNVS Russia" and followed with becoming a full-member of the Rugby League European Federation on the 22 February 2013 and the Rugby League International Federation on the 8 August 2013.

In March 2022, the body had its membership with the IRL and ERL suspended due to the 2022 Russian invasion of Ukraine. In March 2024, while still being suspended, the body was downgraded to affiliate member due to noncompliance with the full membership criteria.

== Competitions ==
As of 2016 the ARLC administrated the "Rugby League Tournament" (ТУРНИР ПО РЕГБИ ЛИГ) and a number of conference leagues.
The 2016 season consists of the following sides:
- RK CSKA, Moscow
- RC Dynamo, Moscow
- RK Fili, Fili
- Lokomotiv, Moscow
- RK NARA, Naro-Fominsk
- RK Polar Bears, Moscow
- RLC Storm, Moscow
- Vereya Bears, Vereya

- Note: This tournament is made up of the best performing teams from the conference leagues.

=== National Championship results ===
(Soviet Union) Soviet Championship

1990 - Moscow Magicians
1991 - Tiraspol Aeolis

(Commonwealth of Independent States) CIS Championship

1992 - RC Lokomotiv Moscow
1993- RC Lokomotiv Moscow
1994 - Moscow Magicians
1995 - Kazan Arrows
1996 -
1997 -

(Russia) Russian Championship

1998 - Kazan Arrows
1999 - Kazan Arrows
2000 - RC Lokomotiv Moscow
2001 - Kazan Arrows
2002 - RC Lokomotiv Moscow
2003 - RC Lokomotiv Moscow
2004 - RC Lokomotiv Moscow
2005 - RC Lokomotiv Moscow
2006 - RC Lokomotiv Moscow
2007 - RC Lokomotiv Moscow
2008 - RC Lokomotiv Moscow
2009 - RC Lokomotiv Moscow
2010 - Vereya Bears
2011 - Vereya Bears
2012 - Vereya Bears
2013 - Vereya Bears
2014 - RC Lokomotiv Moscow
2015 - Vereya Bears

== See also ==
- Russia national rugby league team
- Rugby league in Russia
