= 2024 Rugby League Ireland season =

- League: RLI Premiership; RLI Women's Premiership

The 2024 Rugby League Ireland (RLI) season was the season of rugby league competitions played on the island of Ireland administered by Rugby League Ireland.

In 2024, Rugby League Ireland ran two domestic competitions, RLI Men's Premiership and RLI Women's Premiership. Longhorns won the Men's and Dublin City Exiles won the Women's. In both Competitions the Galways Tribes were runners up.

== RLI Premiership ==
=== Teams ===
Club	City/County	Province	Country
Dublin City Exiles	Dublin	Leinster	Republic of Ireland
Banbridge Broncos	Banbridge, County Down	Ulster	Northern Ireland
Galway Tribesmen	Galway, County Galway	Connacht	Republic of Ireland
Longhorns RL	Dublin	Leinster	Republic of Ireland
Cork Bulls	Cork City, County Cork	Munster	Republic of Ireland

=== Results ===
==== Table ====
After round 4 (includes walkovers from Blitz round)

Pos	Team	P	W	L	D	PF	PA	PD	Pts
1	Longhorns	5 (7)	4	1	0	276	94	182	18
2	Galway Tribesmen	4 (6)	2	2	0	145	58	87	12
3	Banbridge Broncos	4 (6)	2	2	0	138	101	37	10
4	Dublin City Exiles	2 (5)	1	1	0	56	140	-84	4
5	Cork Bulls	3 (6)	0	3	0	48	210	-162	0

==== Round 1 ====
Home	Score	Away	Match Information	
Home	Score	Away	Date and Time	Venue
Cork Bulls	6-42	Galway Tribesmen	18 May 13:00	Douglas RFC
Longhorns	60-12	Dublin City Exiles	18 May 13:00	St Catherines Park, Lucan

==== Round 2 ====
Home	Score	Away	Match Information	
Home	Score	Away	Date and Time	Venue
Galway Tribesmen	19-12	Banbridge Broncos	8 June 13:00	Claddagh Swamp
Cork Bulls	22-64	Longhorns	8 June 13:00	Fermoy RFC

==== Round 3 ====
Home	Score	Away	Match Information	
Home	Score	Away	Date and Time	Venue
Dublin City Exiles	44-20	Cork Bulls	15 June 2:30pm	Tereneure College RFC
Banbridge Broncos	22-60	Longhorns	15 June 1:00pm	Ballynahinch RFC

==== Round 4 (Magic Round) ====
Home	Score	Away	Match Information	
Home	Score	Away	Date and Time	Venue
Galway Tribesmen	12-18	Banbridge Broncos	22 June	Ballynahinch RFC grounds
Galway Tribesmen	12-22	Longhorns	22 June	Ballynahinch RFC grounds
Longhorns	10-26	Banbridge Broncos	22 June	Ballynahinch RFC grounds

Cork Bulls and Dublin City Exiles fielded no team so all other teams get a 30-0 walkover against them. Regular matches get 4 points for a win. Blitz matches get 2 points.

==== Round 5 ====
Home	Score	Away	Match Information	
Home	Score	Away	Date and Time	Venue
Dublin City Exiles		Galway Tribesmen	6 July	??
Banbridge Broncos		Cork Bulls	6 July	??

==== Round 6 ====
Home	Score	Away	Match Information	
Home	Score	Away	Date and Time	Venue
Dublin City Exiles		Banbridge Broncos	20 July 2024	??
Longhorns		Galway Tribesmen	20 July	??

=== Finals series ===
Home	Score	Away	Match Information
Home	Score	Away	Date and Time	Venue
Semi-finals
Galway Tribesmen	30-0	Banbridge Broncos	27 July 2024	??
Longhorns	26-20	Dublin City Exiles	27 July 2024	??
Grand Final
Galway Tribesmen	16-32	Longhorns	15:15 10 August 2024	Dubarry Park, Buccaneers RFC, Athlone

== RLI Women's Premiership ==
=== Teams ===
Club	City/County	Country
Dublin City Exiles	Dublin	Republic of Ireland
Galway Tribesmen	Galway	Republic of Ireland
Banbridge Broncos	Banbridge	Northern Ireland

=== Results ===
==== Table ====
Pos	Team	P	W	L	D	PF	PA	PD	Pts
1	Dublin City Exiles	1	1	0	0	28	10	18	2
2	Banbridge Broncos	0	0	0	0	0	0	0	0
3	Galway Tribeswomen	1	0	1	0	10	28	-18	0

==== Round 1 ====
Home	Score	Away	Match Information	
Home	Score	Away	Date and Time	Venue
Dublin City Exiles	28-10	Galway Tribewomen	25 May 3pm	Terenure College RFC

==== Round 2 Friendly ====
Home	Score	Away	Match Information	
Home	Score	Away	Date and Time	Venue
Galway Tribeswomen	28-22	Dublin City Exiles	8 June 15:00pm	Claddagh Swamp

==== Round 3 (Magic Round) ====
Home	Score	Away	Match Information	
Home	Score	Away	Date and Time	Venue
Galway Tribeswomen	18-6	Banbridge Broncos	22 June 2024	Ballynahinch RFC
Galway Tribeswomen	0-22	Dublin City Exiles	22 June 2024	Ballynahinch RFC
Galway Tribeswomen	14-4	Dublin City Exiles	22 June 2024	Ballynahinch RFC

==== Round 5 ====
Home	Score	Away	Match Information	
Home	Score	Away	Date and Time	Venue
Galway Tribeswomen		Banbridge Broncos	6 July 2024	??

==== Round 5? ====
Home	Score	Away	Match Information	
Home	Score	Away	Date and Time	Venue
Dublin City Exiles		Banbridge Broncos	13 July 2024	??

==== Round 6 ====
Home	Score	Away	Match Information	
Home	Score	Away	Date and Time	Venue
Dublin City Exiles		Galway Tribeswomen	20 July 2024	??

== National teams ==
=== Men ===
The men's national team as of June have no scheduled matches for 2024.

=== Men U16 ===
The men's U16 national team opened their international campaign for 2024 with a 12-44 loss to Wales in Terenure, followed by a 44-10 defeat to England. They concluded their 2024 season with an away double-header fixture against Scotland. Two fixtures were played by the U16 panel, recording 34-12 and 24-4 wins.

01 June 2024
15:00

Ireland U16	12–44	Wales U16
Try: Crawford 8'; Twomey 60'; Con: Rhodes (2) 8' 60'	Report	Try: Marozzelli 16'; Johnson 24' 51'; Roberts 28' 38'; E. Williams 48'; Con: Clatworthy (6) 16' 24' 28' 42' 44' 48' 51'

Lakelands, Dublin, Ireland
Attendance: Unknown
Referee: Jason Le Lievre (New Zealand)

29 June 2024
12:00

England Community Lions U16	44-10	Ireland U16
Try: Storr 3'; Morris 12'; Campbell 20'; Jeffers 33' 64'; Bowes 45' 62' 71'; Con: Dickinson 12' 33'; Bowes 62' 64' 71'; Pen: Dickinson 15'	Report	Try: Gorman 7'; Ireland 67'; Con: Gorman 67'

Ince Rose Bridge ARLFC, Ince-in-Makerfield, England
Attendance: Unknown
Referee: Shea Harrison (England)

03 August 2024
12:00

Scotland U16	12-34	Ireland U16

Cambuslang Rugby Club, Glasgow, Scotland
Attendance: Unknown

03 August 2024
13:30

Scotland U16	4-24	Ireland U16

Cambuslang Rugby Club, Glasgow, Scotland
Attendance: Unknown

=== Women ===
The women's national team began their World Cup qualifying campaign in April beating The Netherlands but losing to Wales. They finished in second place in RLWC European Qualifying Tournament Group A, which left their qualification hopes alive via the World Series repechage. Entry to the repechage was secured in October by a single leg playoff win against RLWC European Qualifying Tournament Group B runners-up Greece.

28 April 2024
14:45

Wales	28–10	Ireland
Try: Dainton 10' 54'; Taylor 22'; Salter 33'; Parker 79'; Con: Salter (4)	Report	Try: Tutty 19'; Molloy 78'; Con: Cobain

Cardiff University Sports Park, Cardiff
Attendance: 500
Referee: Sam Jenkinson (England)

19 May 2024
15:00

Ireland	16–12	Netherlands
Try: Preston 12'; Cobain 43' 72'; Con: Cobain (2)	Report	Try: Van Der Zwan 18'; N. Kennedy 33'; J. Kennedy 59'; Con: Cobain

Energia Park, Dublin
Attendance: Unknown
Referee: Fabien Nicaud (France)

12 October 2024
15:00 EEST (UTC+03:00)

Greece	6–42	Ireland
Tries: Lamprou 62'; Goals: Pappa (1/1)	Report	Tries: Doyle 15'; Fitzegerald 23'; Molloy 27'; O'Dwyer 33'; Lambert 41', 56'; McGuinness 48'; Tutty 70'; Goals: Cobain (5/8)

Gkorytsa Stadium, Athens
Referee: T. Jones (England)

=== Wheelchair ===
The wheelchair national team begin their Celtic Cup campaign in June. They won both of their matches to take the title for the first time since 2015.

8 June 2024
10:30 IST (UTC+01:00)

Ireland	68–34	Scotland
Tries: Burton-Carter 1', 7'; Johnston 10', 13', 34', 39'; Calcott 26', 31', 41'; Spain 52'; McCarthy 55'; Roberts 72'; Goals: Johnston (8/9); Calcott (2/3)	Report	Tries: Davidson 20', 79; Willans 22'; Grant 47'; Hill 59', 76', 77; Goals: Willans (3/4); Grant (0/2)

Kingfisher Club, University of Galway, Ireland
Referees: Jake Brook (England), David Roig (France)

8 June 2024
14:30 IST (UTC+01:00)

Ireland	68–32	Wales
Tries: Roberts 1'; McCarthy 5'; Calcott 9', 41'; Johnston 14', 25', 37'; Horgan 35', 43'; Spain 47', 50', 63'; Goals: Johnston (9/11); Joe Calcott (1/1)	Report	Tries: Williams 29' 67'; Davies 31'; Turner 52', 58; Trigg-Turner 60'; Goals: Trigg-Turner (3/4); Turner (1/2)

Kingfisher Club, University of Galway, Ireland
Referees: David Roig (France), David Butler (England)
