= Cameron Ciraldo =

Australian-Italian rugby league player and coach

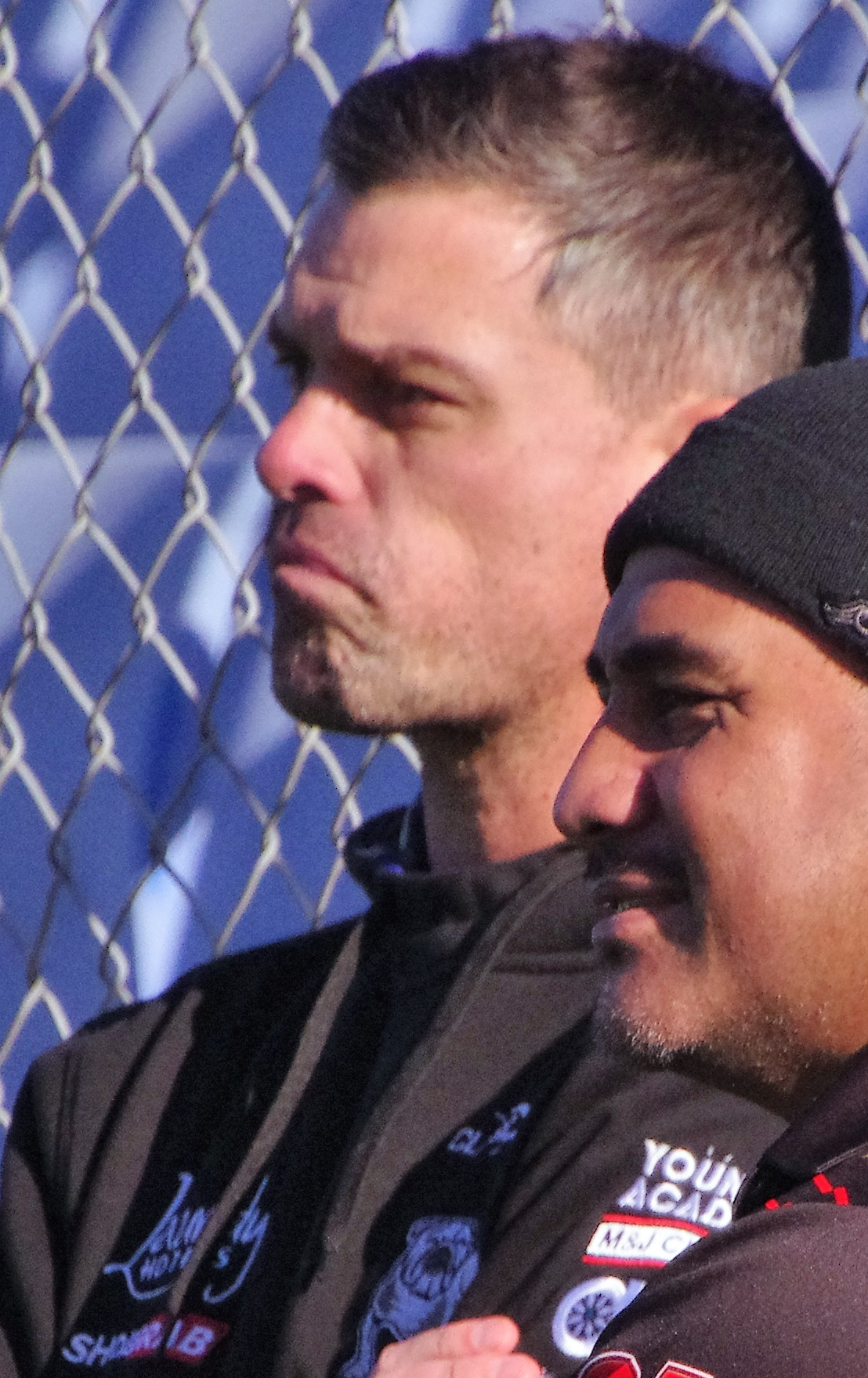

Personal information
- Full name: Cameron Ciraldo
- Born: 30 October 1984 (age 42) Sydney, New South Wales, Australia
- Height: 197 cm (6 ft 6 in)
- Weight: 104 kg (16 st 5 lb)

Playing information
- Position: Second-row, Lock
Club
Years	Team	Pld	T	G	FG	P
2005–07	Cronulla Sharks	19	1	0	0	4
2008–11	Newcastle Knights	43	4	0	0	16
2012–13	Penrith Panthers	32	1	0	0	4
	Total	94	6	0	0	24
Representative
Years	Team	Pld	T	G	FG	P
2011–13	Italy	7	2	0	0	8

Coaching information
Club
Years	Team	Gms	W	D	L	W%
2018	Penrith Panthers	7	4	0	3	57
2023–	Canterbury Bulldogs	99	48	0	51	48
	Total	106	52	0	54	49
Representative
Years	Team	Gms	W	D	L	W%
2016	Italy	6	3	0	3	50
- Source: As of 4 September 2026

Cameron Ciraldo (born 30 October 1984) is a professional rugby league football coach who is the head coach of the Canterbury-Bankstown Bulldogs in the National Rugby League (NRL), and a former professional rugby league footballer. He is known as the defensive coach behind the Penrith Panthers back-to-back premierships in 2021 and 2022. He was previously the head coach of the Italy national team and an assistant coach of the Penrith Panthers in the NRL. During his playing career, Ciraldo played for Cronulla, Newcastle Knights and the Penrith Panthers, all in the NRL, and was selected to represent Italy. He primarily played as a second-row or lock.

== Early life ==
Ciraldo was born in Sydney, New South Wales, Australia, to parents Nick and Kelly Ciraldo. He is of Italian descent through his paternal grandparents, who migrated from Italy as a child. He completed his schooling at Menai High School class of 2002.

== Playing career ==
Ciraldo made his NRL debut for Cronulla on 5 August 2005 in their round 22 game against the Melbourne Storm at Endeavour Field.

Ciraldo signed a two-year deal with Newcastle on 19 October 2007. On 23 March 2009, he broke his fibula in four places and dislocated his ankle while playing against Cronulla-Sutherland at Toyota Stadium. He was escorted from the field with his ankle rotated at approximately 90 degrees; the injury was described as "one of the most sickening injuries on a football field". On 10 September 2009, Ciraldo re-signed with Newcastle on a two-year deal.

On 17 August 2011, Ciraldo signed a two-year deal with the Penrith Panthers. He played for the Windsor Wolves, Penrith's feeder team, in their 8–36 loss to the Cronulla-Sutherland Sharks in the 2013 NSW Cup Grand Final on 6 October 2013.

Ciraldo retired at the end of the 2013 NRL season.

=== Representative career ===
In October 2009, Ciraldo represented Italy in the Australian Mediterranean (Aus-Med) Shield at Marconi Stadium in Sydney, a tournament made up completely of Australian residents, such as Blake Austin, John Skandalis and Jarrod Sammut. Italy's match against Malta was Ciraldo's first time taking the field since breaking his leg in March 2009. Ciraldo was named in the Italian squad for the 2009 European Cup, also held in October, but was unable to attend due to scheduling conflicts.

In April 2011, Ciraldo was named as vice-captain for Italy in their 2013 World Cup qualifying campaign in October 2011. He made his Test debut against Russia on 15 October 2011, scoring a try in Italy's 92–6 win. He played in all three of Italy's matches.

For the 2013 Rugby League World Cup, Ciraldo was again named as vice-captain of the team.

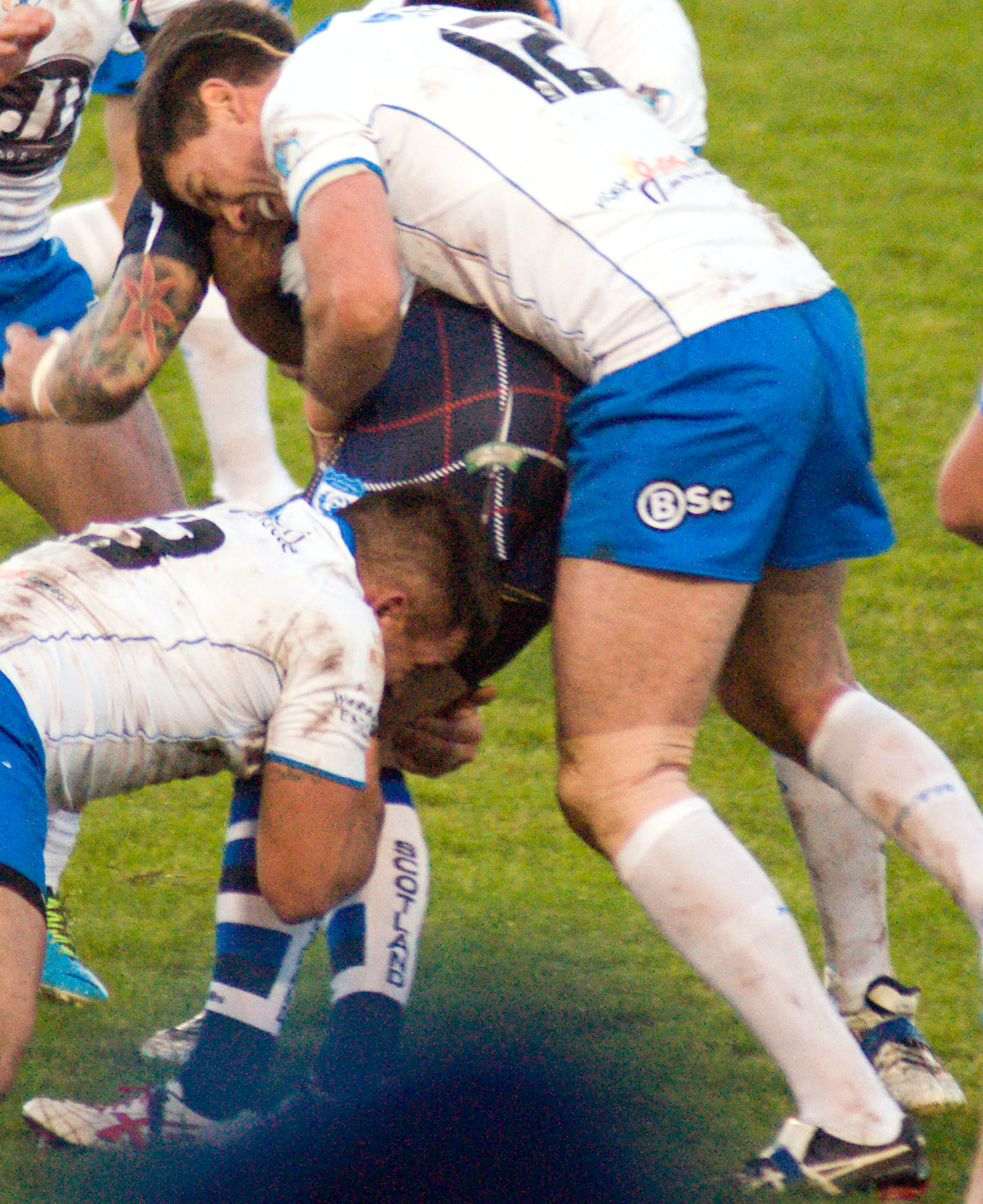
Ciraldo (right) making a tackle for Italy at the 2013 World Cup

He played in Italy's 15–14 upset over England in their pre-tournament friendly match, and featured in all three of their World Cup group matches, scoring a try in their game against Scotland.

== Coaching career ==
Following his retirement from his playing career, Ciraldo became the assistant coach of the Penrith Panthers' NYC team in 2014, under head coach Trent Barrett. On 5 April 2014, Ciraldo was appointed as assistant coach of the Italy national team, also under head coach Barrett.

Ciraldo was promoted to head coach of Penrith's NYC team in 2015. That year, his team won 20 of their 24 regular season games to claim the minor premiership, before going on to win the Grand Final. The following year, the team won 18 of their 24 regular season games (in addition to 2 draws) to claim the minor premiership for the second consecutive year. However, they were unsuccessful in winning back-to-back premierships, losing 30–28 to the Sydney Roosters after leading 28–6 at halftime. Ciraldo was named as coach in the NYC Team of the Year in both 2015 and 2016.

In May 2016, Ciraldo was named as head coach of the Italy national team. Assistant coach Leo Epifania mentored the team during their 2016 Mediterranean Cup match against Lebanon in June, but Ciraldo returned as head coach for their 2017 Rugby League World Cup qualifying matches in October 2016. The Italian team defeated Russia in the repechage round to qualify for the 2017 World Cup.

In 2017, Ciraldo was promoted to assistant coach of Penrith's NRL team to work under head coach Anthony Griffin. In August 2018, Ciraldo was promoted to caretaker coach following Griffin's sacking as head coach. Ciraldo guided Penrith to a 5th-place finish and the club qualified for the finals. In week one, Penrith defeated New Zealand to set up an elimination final against Cronulla. Cronulla went on to win the match 21–20. In October 2018, Ciraldo was replaced as head coach by Ivan Cleary with Ciraldo dropping back to an assistant coach role at Penrith.

Ciraldo was Penrith's assistant coach in the 2020 NRL Grand Final, before winning the premiership in 2021.

On 14 August 2022, the Canterbury side announced that Ciraldo would join the club as head coach on a five-year arrangement from 2023 onwards. Ciraldo would join Penrith Panthers premiership winners Matt Burton and Viliame Kikau at Belmore. Ciraldo enjoyed an extensive relationship with Canterbury general manager Phil Gould who promoted him into his first coaching roles. Canterbury's first season under Ciraldo would prove a disastrous one as the club finished 15th on the table with the worst points differential in the competition. In the 2024 NRL season, Ciraldo would guide Canterbury to a sixth placed finish on the table which saw the club qualify for the finals. This was the first time in eight years that Canterbury had managed to achieve this. Canterbury's season would be ended however in week one of the finals losing to Manly. On 8 September 2025, the Canterbury club announced that Ciraldo had extended his contract until the end of 2031. Ciraldo guided Canterbury to a 4th placed finish in the 2025 NRL season. After round 11, the club sat first on the table but a drop in form occurred towards the back end of the regular season. With signing of Tigers halfback Lachlan Galvin Ciraldo would make changes to the spine after a great start they would go backwards. Canterbury would be eliminated from the finals in straight sets.

In the 2026 NRL season, Canterbury started the year as one of the favourites to make the finals and challenge for the premiership. Ciraldo guided the club to a disappointing 12th placed finish on the table.

== Statistics ==
=== NRL Playing Career ===
Year	Team	Games	Tries	Pts
2005	Cronulla-Sutherland Sharks	2		
2006	Cronulla-Sutherland Sharks	10	1	4
2007	Cronulla-Sutherland Sharks	7		
2008	Newcastle Knights	14	1	4
2009	Newcastle Knights	2		
2010	Newcastle Knights	13	2	8
2011	Newcastle Knights	14	1	4
2012	Penrith Panthers	21	1	4
2013	Penrith Panthers	11		
	Totals	94	6	24

=== NRL interim coach at Penrith to Coaching at Bulldogs Career ===
Year	Team	Games	Wins	Losses	Draws	Win %	Pos
2018	Penrith Panthers	6	3	3	0	50	5th
2023	Canterbury-Bankstown Bulldogs	24	7	17	0	29.17	15th
2024	Canterbury-Bankstown Bulldogs	25	14	11	0	56	6th
2025	Canterbury-Bankstown Bulldogs	23	16	8	0	69.57	3rd
	Totals	79	41	38	0	51.90	

== Personal life ==
Ciraldo married model, Kimberly Rendall, in October 2007 at St Andrew's Anglican Church in Cronulla.
