= Adham =

- Pronunciation: Arabic: [æd.hæm]
- Gender: Male

Origin
- Origin: Arabic
- Meaning: Intensity in the blackness

Adham (Arabic: أدهم) as a masculine given name means "intensity in the blackness" in traditional Arabic, used to describe shiny black stallions. Its variants include Edhem (Turkish, Bosnian) and Ədhəm (Azeri, Tatar).

Notable people with this name include:

== Given name ==
- Adham Ahmedbaev (born 1966), Uzbek politician
- Adham al-Akrad (1974–2020), Syrian rebel leader
- Adham Al-Sqour (born 1994), Jordanian gymnast
- Adham Baba (born 1962), Malaysian politician
- Adham Barzani (born 1962), Iraqi politician
- Adham El Idrissi (born 1997), Dutch footballer
- Adham El Zabedieh, Lebanese rugby league footballer
- Adham Hatem Elgamal (born 1998), Egyptian badminton player
- Adham Faramawy (born 1981), British artist
- Adham Fawzy (born 2000), Egyptian chess player
- Adham Hadiya (born 1985), Israeli footballer
- Adham Hassoun, Lebanese-born Palestinian, convicted of conspiracy in the United States
- Adham Khalid (born 2002), Egyptian footballer
- Adham Khan (1531–1562), general of Akbar
- Adham Khanjar (1890–1922), Lebanese Shiite rebel
- Adham Makhadmeh (born 1986), Jordanian football referee
- Adham Medhat (born 1975), Egyptian sport shooter
- Adham Nabulsi (born 1993), Jordanian-Palestinian artist, vocalist, producer, composer, and songwriter
- Adham Ahmed Saleh (born 1993), Egyptian wrestler
- Adham Shaikh, Canadian composer
- Adham Sharara (born 1953), Canadian sports official

== Surname ==
- Abbas Adham (1885–1969), Iranian physician and politician
- Adel Adham (1928–1996), Egyptian actor
- Allen Adham, American businessman
- Ibrahim ibn Adham (718–782), Arab Muslim saint and Sufi mystic
- Ismail Adham (1911–1940), Egyptian writer
- Kamal Adham (1929–1999), Turkish-born Saudi intelligence chief and businessman
- Mohamed Ashour El-Adham (born 1985), Egyptian footballer

== Fictional characters ==
- Adham Sabri, the main character in the Ragol Al Mostaheel series by Nabil Farouk

== Other uses ==
- Sultan Ibrahim Ibn Adham Mosque, the largest mosque in the Palestinian town of Beit Hanina

== See also ==
- Ethem (disambiguation)
- Edhem, the Turkish spelling of this name
