= Billy Treacy =

Ireland international rugby league player

Billy Treacy (birth unknown), also known by the nickname of "Billy Whizz", is an Irish rugby league footballer who played in the 2000s. He played at representative level for Ireland, and at club level in the Irish Elite League for the Treaty City Titans (in Limerick).

== Background ==
Billy Treacy was born in Ireland.

== Playing career ==
He was named in the Ireland training squad for the 2008 Rugby League World Cup.
