= Zoran Pešić =

Zoran Pešić may refer to:

- Zoran Pešić (rugby league) (born 1983) Serbian rugby league footballer
- Zoran Pešić (footballer, born 1983) Serbian football player
- Zoran Pešić (footballer, born 1951) Serbian football player and manager
