= Kevin O'Riordan =

Ireland international rugby league player

Personal information
- Full name: Kevin O'Riordan
- Born: 1991 (age 34–35) Tipperary, Ireland

Playing information
Club
Years	Team	Pld	T	G	FG	P
	Treaty City Titans
Representative
Years	Team	Pld	T	G	FG	P
	Ireland men's national rugby league team

Kevin O'Riordan (born 1991) is a rugby league footballer who plays for the Treaty City Titans in the Irish Elite League. He is a member of Ireland men's national rugby league team. In August 2015, O'Riordan began his "Kick for Kolkata" (or "kickathon") fundraiser in which he aimed to kick a point over the bar at all 1,616 GAA clubs in the 32 counties by St Patrick's Day 2016.

== Background ==
Kevin O'Riordan was born in Tipperary, Ireland.
