= Michael Brodie (rugby league) =

Ireland international rugby league footballer

Mike Brodie
Personal information
- Full name: Michael Brodie
- Born: Ireland

Playing information
Club
Years	Team	Pld	T	G	FG	P
	Treaty City Titans	0	0	0	0	0
Representative
Years	Team	Pld	T	G	FG	P
2005	Ireland	1	0	0	0	0
- As of 27 May 2021

Michael "Mike" Brodie (birth WGC), also known by the nickname of "Dandy" or "Badger", is an Irish rugby league footballer who played in the 2000s. He played at representative level for Ireland, and at club level in the Irish Elite League for the Treaty City Titans (in Limerick).
