= 2022 Rugby League Ireland season =

- League: RLI Premiership; RLI Championship; RLI Women's Premiership
- Duration: 6 rounds in Premiership
- Teams: 7
- RLI Premiership: Dublin City Exiles
- RLI Championship: Banbridge Broncos

The 2022 Rugby League Ireland (RLI) season was a suite of rugby league competitions played on the island of Ireland administered by Rugby League Ireland. Featuring a two division men's Premiership and Championship, as well as a two-game Women's Premiership, the season saw the Dublin City Exiles and Banbridge Broncos remain undefeated in their respective divisions to take home the title.

== RLI Premiership ==
Four teams contested the RLI Premiership, with the Dublin City Exiles winning the title with a perfect 6–0 record across the season.

=== Teams ===
| Club | City/County | Country |
|---|---|---|
| Dublin City Exiles | Dublin | Republic of Ireland |
| Athboy Fighting Irish | Athboy | Republic of Ireland |
| Galway Tribesmen | Galway | Republic of Ireland |
| Longhorns RL | Leinster | Republic of Ireland |

=== Results ===
==== Round 1 ====
| Home | Score | Away | Date |
|---|---|---|---|
| Galway Tribesmen | 10–24 | Dublin City Exiles | 28/05/2022 |
| Athboy Fighting Irish | Cancelled | Longhorns RL | 28/05/2022 |

==== Round 2 ====
| Home | Score | Away | Date |
|---|---|---|---|
| Longhorns RL | 24–24 | Galway Tribesmen | 04/06/2022 |
| Dublin City Exiles | 50–0 | Athboy Fighting Irish | 04/06/2022 |

==== Round 3 ====
| Home | Score | Away | Date |
|---|---|---|---|
| Dublin City Exiles | 26–16 | Longhorns RL | 11/06/2022 |
| Athboy Fighting Irish | 14–44 | Galway Tribesmen | 11/06/2022 |

==== Round 4 ====
| Home | Score | Away | Date |
|---|---|---|---|
| Athboy Fighting Irish | 0–30 | Dublin City Exiles | 02/07/2022 |
| Galway Tribesmen | 36–28 | Longhorns RL | 02/07/2022 |

==== Round 5 ====
| Home | Score | Away | Date |
|---|---|---|---|
| Dublin City Exiles | 50–0 | Galway Tribesmen | 09/07/2022 |
| Athboy Fighting Irish | 0–50 | Longhorns RL | 09/07/2022 |

==== Round 6 ====
| Home | Score | Away | Date |
|---|---|---|---|
| Galway Tribesmen | 50–0 | Athboy Fighting Irish | 16/07/2022 |
| Longhorns RL | 22–52 | Dublin City Exiles | 16/07/2022 |

=== Ladder ===
| Pos | Team | P | W | L | D | PF | PA | PD | Pts |
|---|---|---|---|---|---|---|---|---|---|
| 1 | Dublin City Exiles (C) | 6 | 6 | 0 | 0 | 232 | 48 | 184 | 12 |
| 2 | Galway Tribesmen | 6 | 3 | 2 | 1 | 164 | 140 | 24 | 7 |
| 3 | Longhorns RL | 5 | 1 | 3 | 1 | 140 | 138 | 2 | 5 |
| 4 | Athboy Fighting Irish | 5 | 0 | 5 | 0 | 14 | 224 | -210 | 0 |

Note: (C) = Champions

== RLI Championship ==
Three teams contested the RLI Championship, with the Banbridge Broncos taking the title back to Northern Ireland with a perfect record.

=== Teams ===
| Club | City/County | Country |
|---|---|---|
| Banbridge Broncos | Banbridge, County Down | Northern Ireland |
| Cork Bulls | Cork | Republic of Ireland |
| Dublin City Exiles II | Dublin | Republic of Ireland |

=== Results ===
==== Round 1 ====
| Home | Score | Away | Date |
|---|---|---|---|
| Cork Bulls | Cancelled | Banbridge Broncos | 28/05/2022 |

==== Round 2 ====
| Home | Score | Away | Date |
|---|---|---|---|
| Dublin City Exiles II | 70–20 | Cork Bulls | 04/06/2022 |

===== Round 3 =====
| Home | Score | Away | Date |
|---|---|---|---|
| Banbridge Broncos | 70–6 | Dublin City Exiles II | 11/06/2022 |

==== Round 4 ====
| Home | Score | Away | Date |
|---|---|---|---|
| Banbridge Broncos | 50–22 | Cork Bulls | 02/07/2022 |

==== Round 5 ====
| Home | Score | Away | Date |
|---|---|---|---|
| Cork Bulls | 50–0 | Dublin City Exiles II | 09/07/2022 |

==== Round 6 ====
| Home | Score | Away | Date |
|---|---|---|---|
| Dublin City Exiles II | 16–32 | Banbridge Broncos | 16/07/2022 |

=== Ladder ===
| Pos | Team | P | W | L | D | PF | PA | PD | Pts |
|---|---|---|---|---|---|---|---|---|---|
| 1 | Banbridge Broncos (C) | 3 | 3 | 0 | 0 | 152 | 44 | 108 | 8 |
| 2 | Cork Bulls | 3 | 1 | 2 | 0 | 92 | 120 | -28 | 2 |
| 3 | Dublin City Exiles II | 4 | 1 | 3 | 0 | 92 | 172 | -80 | 2 |

Note: (C) = Champions

== RLI Women's Premiership ==
The RLI Women's Premiership was held as a two-game series between Galway and Dublin City.

=== Teams ===
| Club | City/County | Country |
|---|---|---|
| Dublin City Exiles | Dublin | Republic of Ireland |
| Galway Tribesmen | Galway | Republic of Ireland |

=== Results ===
==== Game 1 ====
| Home | Score | Away | Date |
|---|---|---|---|
| Galway Tribeswomen | 8–44 | Dublin City Exiles | 28/05/2022 |

==== Game 2 ====
| Home | Score | Away | Date |
|---|---|---|---|
| Dublin City Exiles | 32–8 | Galway Tribeswomen | 02/07/2022 |
