= Edhem =

Edhem is a Bosnian and Turkish given name for males, spelled Adham (أدهم) in Arabic. It has also been used as a surname. Notable people named Edhem include:

== Given name ==
- Edhem Bičakčić (1884–1941), Bosnian politician, mayor of Sarajevo
- Edhem Mulabdić (1862–1954), Bosnian writer and co-founder of the political journal Behar
- Edhem Pasha (1851–1909), Ottoman field marshal
- Edhem Šljivo (born 1950), Bosnian football midfielder

== Surname ==
- Emma Edhem (born 1966), councilwoman of the City of London
