= Soni Radovanović =

Serbia international rugby league footballer

Personal information
- Full name: Soni Radovanović
- Born: 31 March 1988 (age 36); Belgrade, Serbia

Playing information
- Position: Prop, Second-row, Loose forward
Club
Years	Team	Pld	T	G	FG	P
	Dorćol Spiders
2005	London Skolars
	Warrington Wizards
2006	Vereya Bears
2009	Whitehaven RLFC
2013	RC Lescure-Arthes XIII
	Total	0	0	0	0	0
Representative
Years	Team	Pld	T	G	FG	P
2005–11	Serbia	18	6	0	0	24
- As of 30 March 2021

Soni Radovanović (born 1988 (age 36–37)) is a Serbian professional rugby league footballer who has played in the 2000s and 2010s. He has played at representative level for Serbia (captain), and at club level for RC Lescure-Arthes XIII (in Lescure-d'Albigeois, France), Dorćol Spiders (in Dorćol, Belgrade, Serbia), London Skolars (in 2005), Warrington Wizards, Vereya Bears (in Vereya in 2006), in the Co-operative Championship for Whitehaven (in 2009) and the Taš Tigers (in Tašmajdan Sports and Recreation Center, Belgrade, Serbia), as a prop, second-row or loose forward.

== Background ==
Soni Radovanović was born in Belgrade, Yugoslavia.
