= Russian rugby team =

Russian rugby team may refer to:

- Russia national rugby union team
- Russia national rugby league team
