= Robert Campbell (rugby league) =

Former Russia international rugby league footballer

Personal information
- Full name: Robert Campbell
- Born: 25 April 1971 (age 55) Brisbane, Queensland, Australia

Playing information
- Position: Prop
Club
Years	Team	Pld	T	G	FG	P
1996	Gold Coast Chargers	5	0	0	0	0
1997	Widnes	17	5	0	0	20
	Total	22	5	0	0	20
Representative
Years	Team	Pld	T	G	FG	P
2000	Russia	3	0	1	0	2
- Source: As of 18 February 2021

Robert "Bertie" Campbell (born 25 April 1971) is a former Russia international rugby league footballer. A utility player, he was a hooker at school, but played professionally as a prop. Campbell played for Brisbane's Western Suburbs Panthers before signing for Sydney's Western Suburbs Magpies. He later played for Illawarra Steelers and the Gold Coast Chargers.

== Background ==
Campbell was born in Brisbane, Queensland, Australia. He qualifies for Russia via his maternal grandfather, Joseph, who was born in Brest (then Poland; modern day Belarus). The town was annexed by Russia following the First World War. The family moved to Australia when his mother Maria Paulina Kaminski (now Maree Campbell) was four years old.

== Playing career ==
Campbell was also selected from the Redcliffe Dolphins to play for the Russian national side during the 2000 World Cup, qualifying for the Bears via the grandparent rule. Campbell grubber-kicked for Russia's only try, scored by Matt Donovan, in their Test match against Australia, a game that ended in a record 110–4 defeat for the Russians. According to commentator Andrew Voss, author of Stuff You May Have Missed, the Russian mafia allegedly offered Campbell and Donovan huge sums of money in exchange for agreeing to play for the Russian national team in the tournament.

== Post playing ==
Today, Campbell teaches at St. Peter's Rochedale Primary School.
