= Brendan Guilfoyle =

Former Ireland international rugby league footballer

Personal information
- Full name: Brendan Guilfoyle
- Born: 16 July 1984 (age 40); Kilkenny, Ireland

Playing information
Club
Years	Team	Pld	T	G	FG	P
	Treaty City Titans
Representative
Years	Team	Pld	T	G	FG	P
2008–10	Ireland	2	1	0	0	8
- As of 3 February 2021

Brendan Guilfoyle (born 16 July 1984) is an Irish rugby league footballer who plays for the Treaty City Titans in the Irish Elite League. He is an Ireland international.

== Background ==
Guilfoyle was born in Kilkenny, Ireland.

== Career ==
He was named in the Ireland training squad for the 2008 Rugby League World Cup.

As of 2011, he is working as a Development Officer with Rugby League Ireland and has remained a part of the Ireland squad.

He played for Ireland in the 2009 European Cup and the 2010 European Cups. In 2009 he appeared against Serbia where he scored a try on début while in 2010 he started in his side's fixture with France.
