= Ethem =

Ethem is a Turkish male given name and may refer to:

- Ethem Nejat, Turkish revolutionary communist militant
- Ethem Pasha, Ottoman commander
- Çerkes Ethem, Turkish militia leader

== See also ==
- Adham, a variant of the name
