= Ballynahinch Rabbitohs =

Rugby league team in Northern Ireland

- Union: Ulster Conference
- Founded: 2008
- Region: Ulster
- Ground(s): Ballymacaren Park

Ballynahinch Rabbitohs are an Irish semi-professional rugby league team based in Ballynahinch, Northern Ireland. They play in the Ulster Conference of the Irish Elite League. They play their matches at Ballymacaren Park.

== History ==
In their first two years of existence, the club were known as the Ballynahinch Bulls. There were no fixtures played in 2008 with a number of teams not fulfilling fixtures. In 2009, the team competed in the Ulster 9's and won the first ever Ulster Conference league against the Belfast Bulldogs but weren't invited to compete for the All Ireland title. 2010 saw the emergence of the Rabbitohs branding with the full support from the South Sydney Rabbitohs. The season kicked off with victory at the Ulster 9's which was followed with a second league title after a victory over Fermanagh Redskins. There was no Ulster participation again at All Ireland level but the first representative players were honoured with Richard Reaney playing for Ireland A Wolfhounds and Graeme Taylor playing for the Irish Students in the Student 4 Nations.

2011 saw the continuation of Rabbitohs domination in Ulster with the 9's again won and old rivals the Bulldogs defeated in the final. The club weren't able to raise a strong team for the All Ireland semi final and were beaten by the Carlow Crusaders at Armagh RFC. In this season, Graeme Taylor, Willy Stewart and Stephen Corr were selected for Ireland A Wolfhounds while Jonny Cullen was drafted into the full Irish side for the autumn internationals. While he didn't get onto the field of play vs Scotland he was due to play against Wales the following week at the Gnoll but injury robbed him of the opportunity.

The club made it 4 in a row in 2012 with victory in the Grand Final vs the Fermanagh Redskins, although they did lose their Ulster 9's crown to the same opponents. The club inflicted a heavy defeat on Leinster champions, the Athboy Longhorns, to reach their first All Ireland final. The game could have gone either way and the Rabbitohs thought they won it with a late score that was ruled out and the Country Cowboys held out for a 2-point victory. Representative players this season were Robbie Stewart for the Irish Students and James McBriar, Robbie Stewart, Paddy James, Kenny Calladine and Graeme Taylor all were selected for Ireland A Wolfhounds at various times.

== Honours ==
- Ulster League Champions 2009, 2010, 2011, 2012
- All Ireland Semi Finalist 2011
- All Ireland Finalist 2012
- Ulster 9's Winners 2010, 2011

== See also ==
- List of sports clubs inspired by others
