= Stevie Gibbons =

Ireland international rugby league footballer

Steve Gibbons
Personal information
- Full name: Steven Gibbons
- Born: 27 September 1983 (age 42) Dublin, Ireland

Playing information
Club
Years	Team	Pld	T	G	FG	P
2006–07	Carlow Crusaders
2009	Oldham
	London Skolars
	Total	0	0	0	0	0
Representative
Years	Team	Pld	T	G	FG	P
2006–07	Ireland	4

Steve "Stevie" Gibbons (born 27 September 1983) is an Irish professional rugby league footballer who played in the 2000s. He played at representative level for Ireland, and at club level for Carlow Crusaders, Oldham and London Skolars in National League Two.

== Background ==
Gibbons was born in Dublin, Ireland. He is the son of former Irish senator Jim Gibbons, grandson of former TD and government minister Jim Gibbons Snr. and brother of prominent international DJ and music producer John Gibbons.

== International honours ==
Steve Gibbons was named in the Ireland training squad for the 2008 Rugby League World Cup, and the Ireland squad for the 2008 Rugby League World Cup.

Gibbons won caps for Ireland while at Carlow Crusaders 2006–2007 1-cap + 3-caps (sub).
