= James Nixon (rugby league) =

Scottish international rugby league footballer (born 1985)

Personal information
- Born: 10 August 1985 (age 41) Dalton-in-Furness, Cumbria, England

Playing information
- Position: Wing
Club
Years	Team	Pld	T	G	FG	P
2004–14	Barrow Raiders	176	137	0	0	548
Representative
Years	Team	Pld	T	G	FG	P
2009	Scotland	3	5	0	0	20

James Nixon (born 10 August 1985) is a former Scotland international rugby league footballer. He played on the wing for the Barrow Raiders in the Co-operative Championship. He represented Scotland at international level on three occasions in 2009.

== Background ==
He was born in Dalton-in-Furness, Cumbria, England, he is of Scottish descent.

== Career ==
Nixon announced his retirement from the game before the beginning of the 2013 season, but returned later that year to play for amateur side Dalton. He re-signed for Barrow ahead of the 2014 season.

== Career records ==
Nixon is seventh in Barrow's all time try scorers list with 137 tries.
