= Ben Falcone (rugby league) =

Italy rugby league footballer (born 1988)

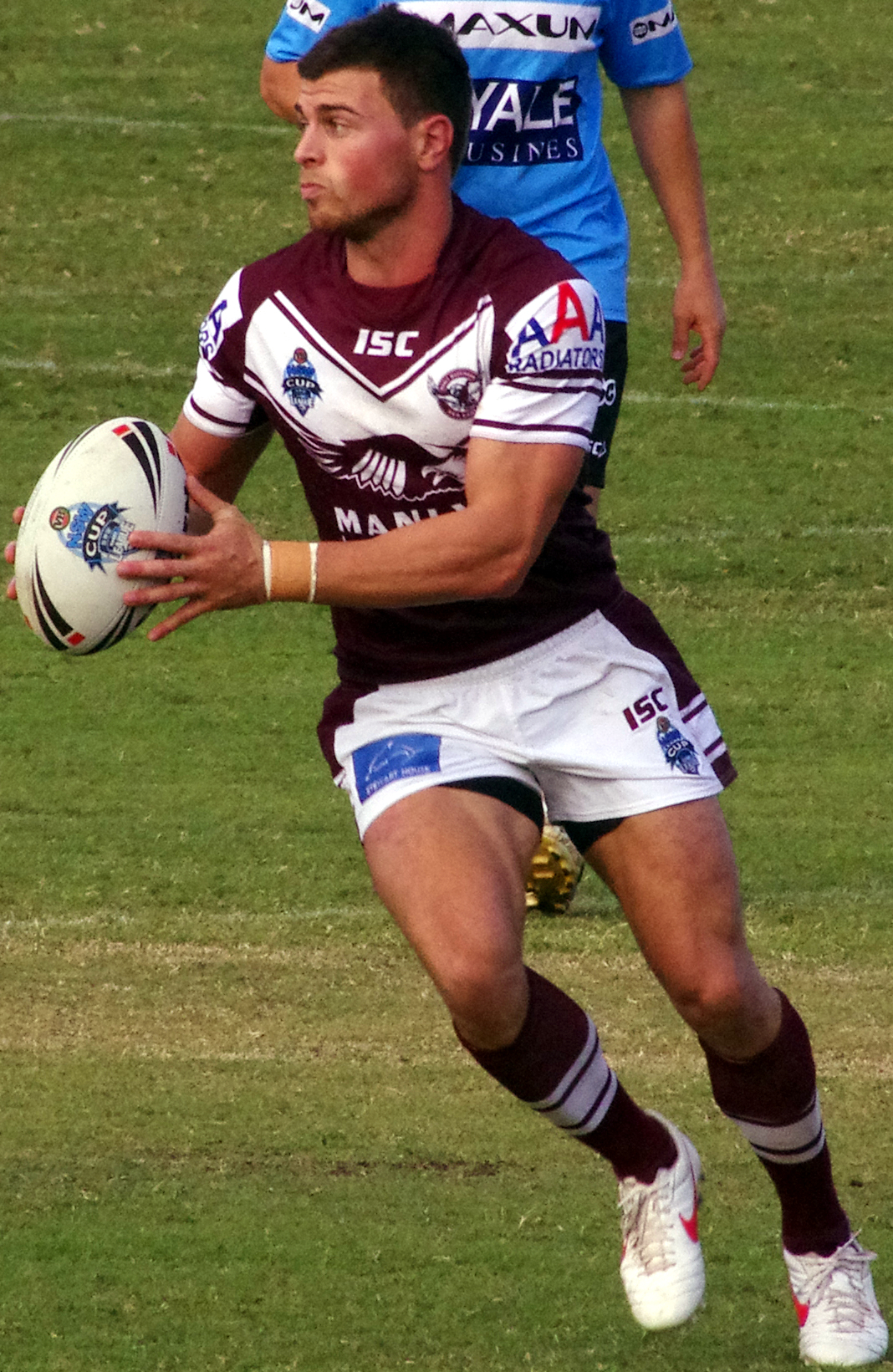

Personal information
- Born: 11 July 1988 (age 37) Sydney, New South Wales, Australia
- Height: 181 cm (5 ft 11 in)
- Weight: 88 kg (13 st 12 lb)

Playing information
- Position: Five-eighth, Halfback
Representative
Years	Team	Pld	T	G	FG	P
2009–13	Italy	7	7	0	0	28

Ben Falcone (born 11 July 1988) is an Australian professional rugby league footballer who represented Italy in the 2013 Rugby League World Cup.

== Playing career ==
He currently plays for the Souths Logan Magpies in the Queensland Cup as a halfback.
