= Treaty City Titans =

Former Irish semi-pro rugby league team based in Limerick

Club information
- Full name: Treaty City Titans RLFC
- Website: www.pitchero.com/clubs/treatycitytitans

Current details
- Competition: Irish Elite League (Munster Conference)

Treaty City Titans were an Irish semi-professional rugby league team based in Limerick, Ireland. They played in the Munster Conference of then called 'Irish Elite League' which was the top tier of competition in domestic Rugby league. They played their matches at Tom Clifford Park.

== History ==
=== Elite League Seasons ===
It was in the first season in 2005, that they won the Elite League winning all of their main eight games along with beating the Carlow Crusaders 24-10 in the Grand Final.

In the 2007 season they became champions again. Out of the ten matches played they won eight and drew only twice, both to the Carlow Crusaders. The first match in June, finished at 22 points each and then in August they drew 0-0. In a repeat to last season, the Grand Final was between the Titans and the Crusaders. The Titans won 38-22 at Old Crescent R.F.C.

In July 2007 the Sky Sports programme Boots'N'All visited Limerick to record a piece on Rugby League in Ireland. The Titans played a friendly match with their "A" team to allow footage to be recorded.

In November of that year, for the Ireland Wolfhounds important match over Russia, to allow entry into the 2008 Rugby League World Cup, three Titans players: Michael "Mike" Brodie, Billy Treacy and Kevin O'Riordan, were selected in the team. They eventually won 58-18 and clinched a place in the World Cup. The same players were expected to feature in that tournament alongside Irish Super League players.

The side won the 2009 Irish Elite League.

== 2022 Squad ==
2022 Treaty City Titans
First team squad		Coaching staff
1 Sean Carmody; 2 Darren Mulcaire; 3 James Hayes; 4 Eoin Ryan; 5 Shane Mullally; 6 Brendan Guilfoyle; 7; 8; 9; 10; 11 Andy Brace; 12 Ross O'Neill; 13	14 Cathal O'Reilly; 15 Ronan Hogan; 16 Anthony Barry; 17 Luke Malone; 18 Jason Thong; 19 Cian Leahy	Legend: (c) Captain(s); (vc) Vice-captain(s)

== Honours ==
- Irish Elite League (8): 2005, 2006, 2007, 2009, 2010, 2011, 2013, 2015
  - Runners-up (2): 2008, 2014
- Munster League (4): 2011, 2013, 2014, 2015
  - Runners-up (1): 2012
