= John Coleman (rugby league) =

Ireland international rugby league footballer

Personal information
- Full name: John Coleman
- Born: Ireland

Playing information
- Position: Wing
Club
Years	Team	Pld	T	G	FG	P
	Sheffield Eagles	0	0	0	0	0
Representative
Years	Team	Pld	T	G	FG	P
2009	Ireland	1	1	0	0	4
- As of 27 May 2021

John Coleman (birth unknown) is an Irish professional rugby league footballer for the Sheffield Eagles in the Co-operative Championship. He plays on the wing. He is an Ireland international.

== Background ==
John Coleman was born in Ireland.
