= Cliff Nye =

Lebanon international rugby league footballer

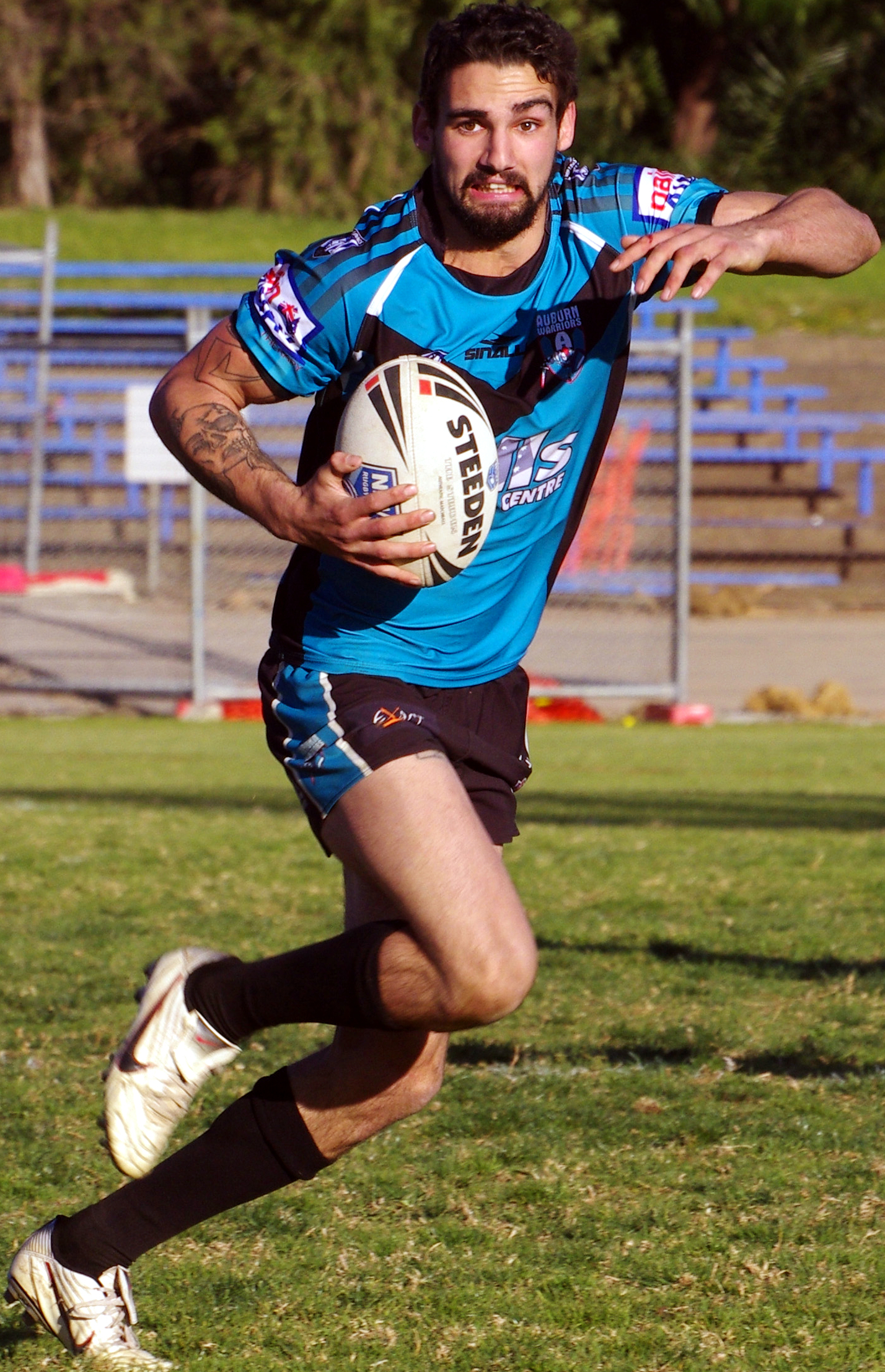

Personal information
- Full name: Clifton F Nye

Playing information
- Position: Centre, Fullback
Representative
Years	Team	Pld	T	G	FG	P
2011–15	Lebanon	6	5	0	0	20
- As of 14 February 2020

Cliff (Clifton) Nye is an Indigenous Australian Lebanese professional rugby league footballer who has played as a centre or fullback for the Auburn Warriors in the Ron Massey Cup.

He played for Wentworthville Magpies in the Ron Massey and NSW Cup.

He was also a Junior Canterbury Bulldogs under 18s SG Ball Representative and under 20s Toyota Cup Representative Canterbury Bulldogs.

Nye is a Lebanese international, selected and toured Europe in the 2013 RUGBY LEAGUE WORLD CUP - EUROPE GAMES.
