= Matt Thomas (rugby league) =

English rugby footballer (born 1976)

Matt Thomas (born 7 January 1976) is an English former professional rugby league footballer who played in the 2000s and 2010s. He played at representative level for Wales twice in 2009, and at club level in the Co-operative Championship 1 for the London Skolars, and the Swinton Lions, as a centre, or second-row. Matt attended the University of Luton and is a qualified sports therapist and personal trainer.
