= Gareth Moore =

Scotland international rugby league footballer

Gareth "Gizmo" or "Langer" Moore
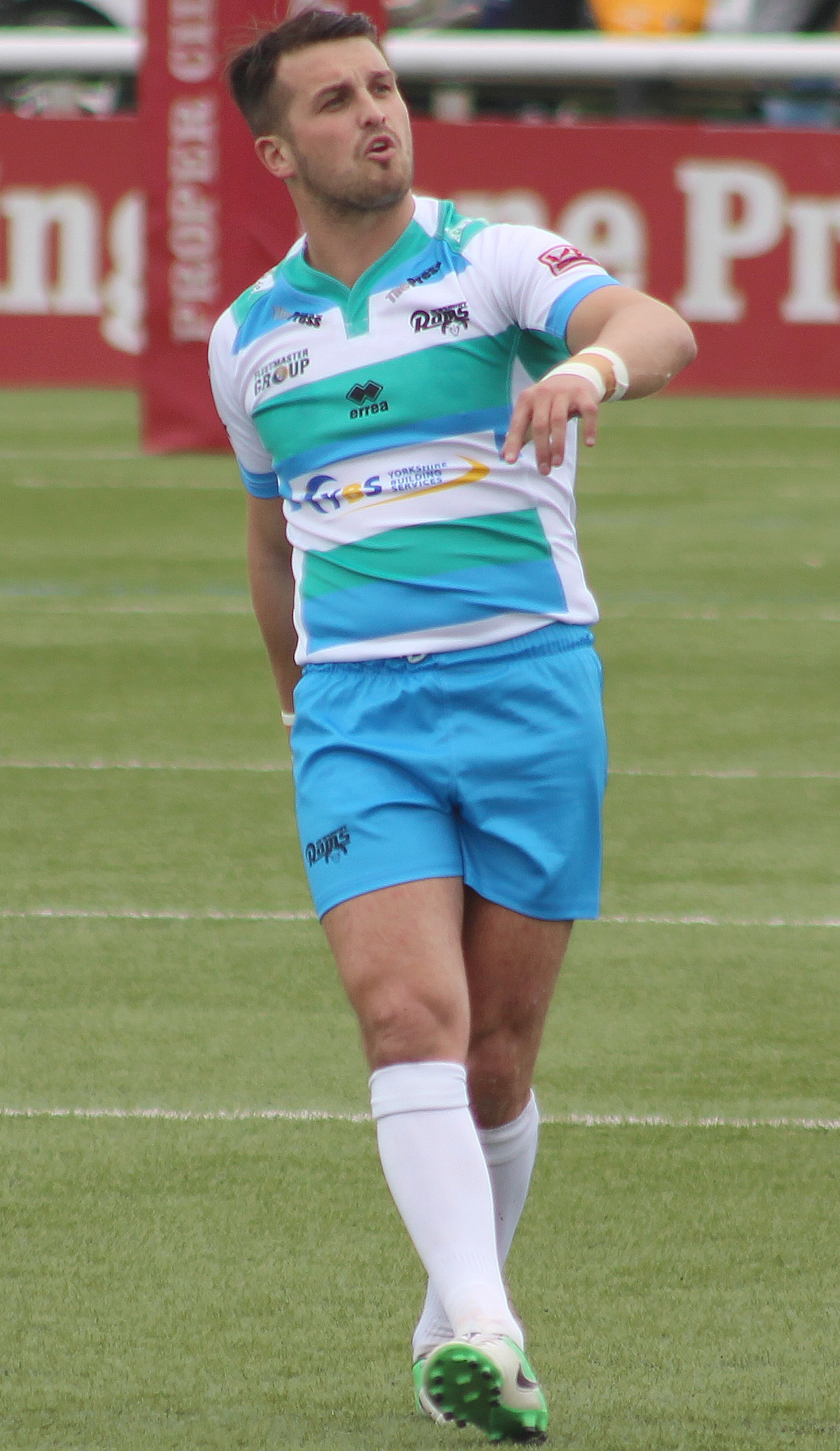

Personal information
- Full name: Gareth Moore
- Born: 3 June 1989 (age 36); Yorkshire

Playing information
- Height: 5 ft 9 in (175 cm)
- Weight: 12 st 4 lb (78 kg)
- Position: Stand-off, Scrum-half
Club
Years	Team	Pld	T	G	FG	P
2006–09	Leeds Rhinos	0	0	0	0	0
2009(loan)	→ Halifax	1	1	0	0	4
2009(loan)	→ York City Knights	7	6	0	0	24
2010–11	Batley Bulldogs	33	19	143	2	364
2011(loan)	→ Wakefield Trinity Wildcats	5	1	14	1	33
2012–13	Batley Bulldogs	49	25	164	1	429
2014–15	Featherstone Rovers	40	20	111	2	304
2016–17	Halifax	36	19	32	3	143
2017–18	Dewsbury Rams	22	7	0	0	28
	Total	193	98	464	9	1329
Representative
Years	Team	Pld	T	G	FG	P
2009	Scotland	3	1	2	0	8

Gareth Moore (born 3 June 1989) is a former professional rugby league footballer who played in the 2000s and 2010s, as a stand-off and scrum-half. He played at representative level for Scotland, and at club level for the Leeds Rhinos (reserve team), Halifax (two spells, including the first on loan), the York City Knights (loan), the Batley Bulldogs (two spells), the Wakefield Trinity Wildcats (loan), Featherstone Rovers, and the Dewsbury Rams in the Betfred Championship, as a stand-off, or scrum-half.

== Playing career ==
He was signed by Featherstone Rovers for the 2014 season as a replacement for Liam Finn.
