= Rugby league in Russia =

Team sport in Russia

- Country: Russia
- Governing body: Association of Rugby League Clubs
- National team: Russia
- Nickname: the Bears
- First played: 1989
- Registered players: 2,000+

National competitions
- Rugby League World Cup; Rugby League European Championship B

Club competitions
- Russian Championship; Russian Conferences

Rugby league is a team sport in Russia. The Russian Association of Rugby League Clubs (ARLK) is the governing body of rugby league in Russia. After the 2022 Russian invasion of Ukraine, the International Rugby League and European Rugby League banned Russia from all international rugby league competitions.

== History ==
A Soviet delegation attended Dewsbury's 1973 English Championship win and suggested that exhibition games be held in Eastern Europe to gauge interest.

Rugby league returned in the late 1980s. Early success for Russian rugby league came in the form of one of the Locomotive Rugby Football Club's junior team of 1987 which was sent to England to compete in a series of matches. Maslov and his friend and President of the Russian Rugby Union, Edgar Taturyan, formed the RRFL.

=== Russian Rugby Football League ===
In May 1991, York and Fulham RLFC toured Russia.

=== Challenge Cup history ===
Kazan Arrows and Moscow Locomotive in December 2001 became the first Russian teams to feature in the Rugby Football League Challenge Cup. Since 2001 Russian clubs have travelled to England to take part in the tournament.

=== Cross roads of 2005 ===
Despite all that happened early in the year, the RRFL went ahead with its annual championship, including the youth world cup, which was thought by many not to go ahead.

=== 2022: ban ===
After the 2022 Russian invasion of Ukraine, the International Rugby League and European Rugby League banned Russia from all international rugby league competitions.

== Competitions until 2008 ==
=== Russian Championship ===
The Russian Championship (or Russian Super League or Championship of Russia) consisted of 6 teams in the 2008 season:

- Locomotive – Moscow
- Arrows – Kazan
- Vereya – Moscow Region
- Crystal – Rostov-on-Don
- Kosmos – Moscow Region
- Legion – Kharkiv (Ukraine)

Dinamo Moscow and St Petersburg Nevskaya Zastava started the season but failed to complete it. Saint Petersburg Lesteh and Volgodonsk Navy-Sphere entered the cup but did not participate in any league.

Championship NFRR-13 Premier League

- Star – RVSN (Serpukhov)
- Kubinka (Moscow Region)
- Nizhegorodets (Nizhny Novgorod)
- Arsenal (Tula)
- RHZB (Kostroma)
- CSK Cosmos (Moscow region)
- Avtomobilist (Ryazan)
- Svyazist (Ryazan)
- VDV (Ryazan)
- WU-CVM (Moscow)
- MOSVOKU (Moscow)
- Vereya Bears (Moscow region)

Major League Major League teams are divided into groups on a geographical basis

Central Group

- Finance (Yaroslavl)
- Voronezh
- Tver
- Iskra (Smolensk)

Southern Group

- Stavropol
- Novocherkask
- Rostov on Don
- Armavir
- Krasnodar

Volga-Ural Group

- Penza
- Kazan
- Wolski
- Chelyabinsk
- Saratov

North-West Group

- VIFK (St. Petersburg)
- Mozhaisky Military Academy (St. Petersburg)

and military institutions of the North-west district

=== Challenge Cup ===
Two teams each year took part in the Rugby League Challenge Cup, along with four teams from France including Les Catalans, although the Challenge Cup is not considered a 'European Cup', more a domestic competition in the UK that invites these teams into the early rounds. However Russian teams have not played in the Challenge Cup since 2009 due to the funding crisis in Russian Rugby League, and their being banned in 2022.

== Crisis of 2009 and 2010 ==
=== Olympic status of Rugby Union Sevens and the expulsion of Rugby League from the State Register of Sports of Russia ===
By mid-2009 the three major clubs of Russian Rugby League had moved over to Rugby Union as a result of government pressure to achieve results in rugby union sevens, newly designated as an Olympic sport. These clubs were Kazan Arrows, Dinamo Moscow and the champions for the past eight years, Lokomotiv Moscow.

Russian Ministry of Sports order number 21 dated 20 January 2010 expelled the Rugby League from the State Register of Sports of Russia. The reasoning for the expulsion was reportedly due to the Ministry's view that Rugby League was not a separate sport from rugby union.

In February a new president of the RRLF was elected, Alexander Eremin. Eremin, the board members and employees of the RRLF are investigating the potential for the continuation of Rugby League in Russia with various government, civic and sports organizations, in particular the Ministry of Sports and Rugby Union of Russia.

After the turmoil of the RRLF losing clubs and players, Edward Taturian caused a split with the Rugby League Federation, to potentially form an Association of Rugby League Clubs.

=== The Association of Rugby League Clubs of Russia (ARLKR) ===
2010 began with no clear framework or competition, within this context the old figurehead Taturyan established the Association of Rugby League Clubs of Russia (ARLKR) seemingly independent of the RRLF. The following clubs joined the ARLKR association:

1. Nevsky Gate
2. Vereyskaya Bears
3. Threshers
4. North Moscow
5. Nara
6. Otradnoe
7. Spartak-Losinka.

(In 1991, Taturian, the former coach of the Soviet Rugby team, split from the Russian rugby union and took over some teams to found the Russian Rugby League. The game grew and became known as the Russian Rugby League Federation.)

== Current domestic competition ==
Rugby league is now played domestically in conferences. North, Central and South. At the conclusion of each conference's fixtures, the top teams enter into the national championship.

== Media ==
Starting in 2009 NTV Plus Sport broadcasts live rugby league matches from the Super League competition.

== The national team ==
The Russian Bears represent Russia in international rugby league tournaments and other rugby league fixtures.

== See also ==
- Russia national rugby league team
- Sport in Russia
