= Steve Azzi =

Lebanese rugby league player

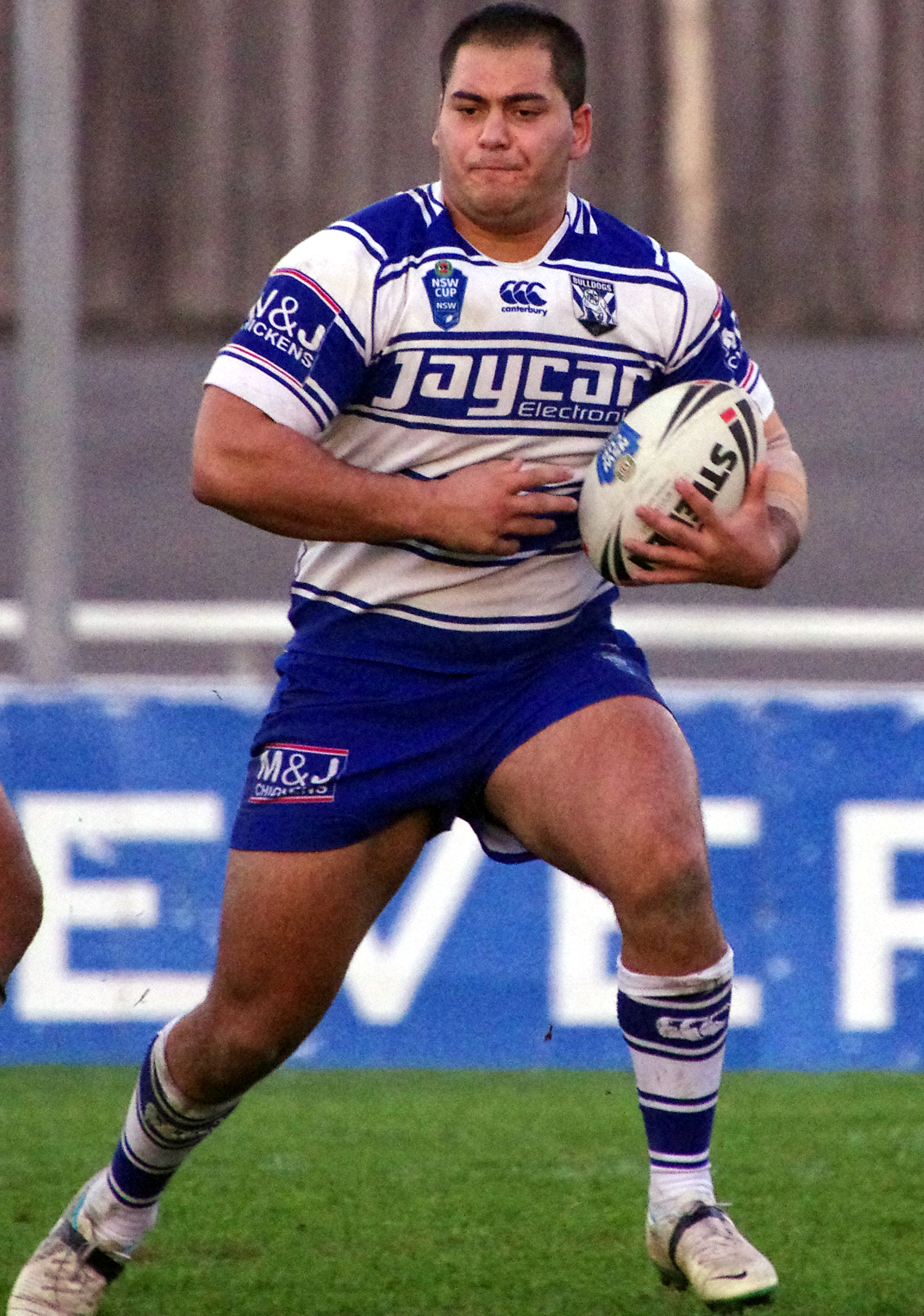

Playing information
- Position: Second-row
Representative
Years	Team	Pld	T	G	FG	P
2009–13	Lebanon	7	1	0	0	4
- Source: As of 9 September 2016

Steve Azzi is a Lebanese international rugby league footballer who has played as a second row for the Canterbury Bulldogs in the NSW Cup.

Azzi is a Lebanese international.
