= Menai High School =

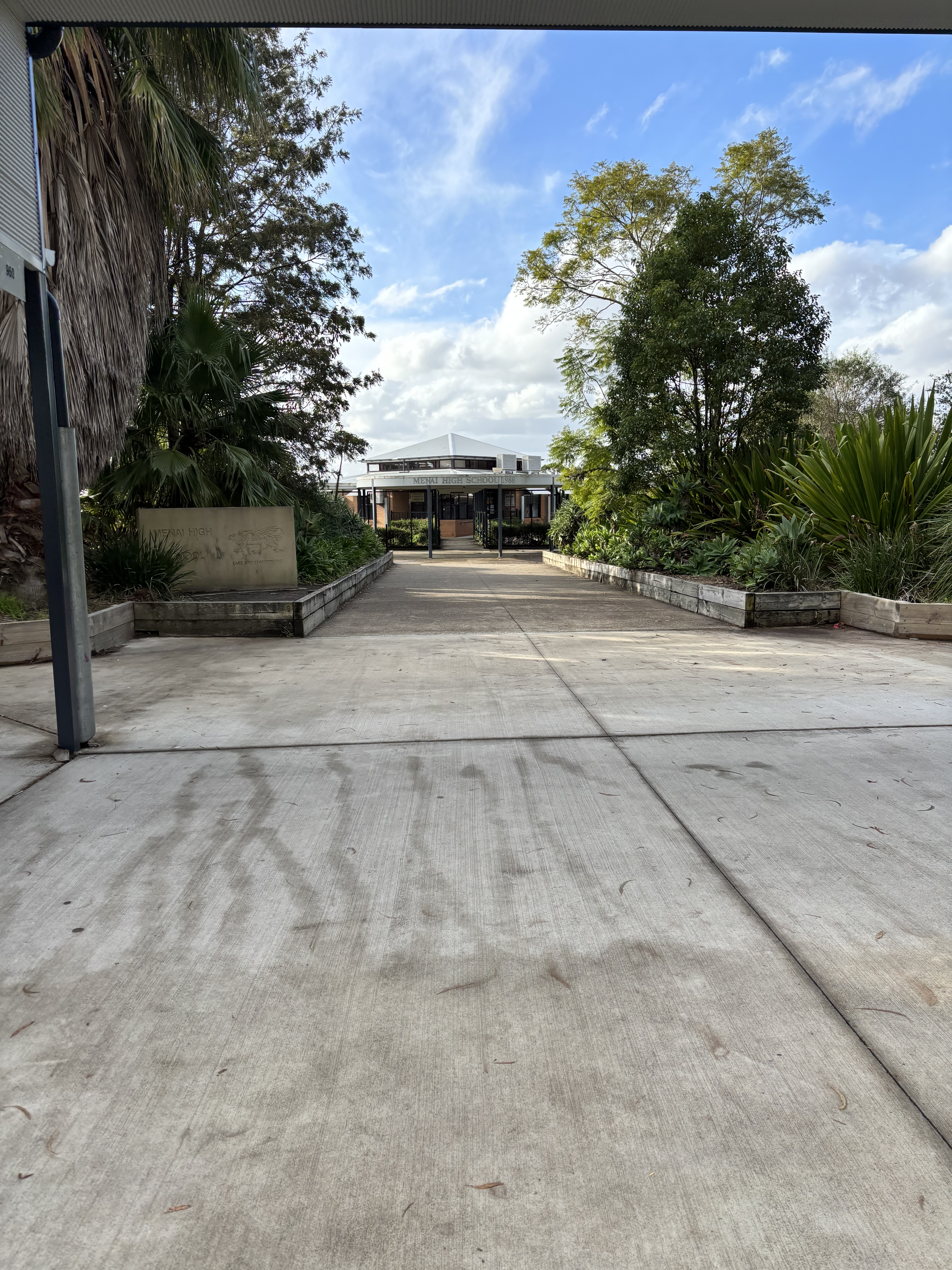
- Menai High School, main entrance

Location
- Illawong, New South Wales; Australia; 34.0029°S 151.0238°E

Information
- Type: Public coeducational
- Motto: Care and Commitment
- Established: 1988
- Principal: John Stanley
- Grades: 7–12
- Enrolment: ~1236
- Colours: White, red and green.
- Website: menai-h.schools.nsw.gov.au

Menai High School is a secondary school in Illawong, a suburb in Sydney's Sutherland Shire.

== History ==
Menai High School was opened in February 1988. Don Harwin was the first principal; after he retired in 1997, Edith McNally took over. She retired in 2015, and was succeeded by Barney Ellevsen.

== Curriculum ==
Menai High school has a successful sporting background, with many teams participating in regional competitions. Other extracurricular activities supported by the school include an agricultural farm, debating, drama and music.

The school has also participated in cultural celebration events, such as in 2006, when the Beverly Hills Intensive English centre visited Menai High School. As part of a cultural exchange program, the event, with performing arts exchanges and food stalls, ultimately aimed at addressing racism and tolerance.

== Notable alumni ==
- Erin Bell – netball player for the Adelaide Thunderbirds
- Tom Glover – goalkeeper for Middlesbrough FC and Australia national soccer team
- Amanda Harrison – award-winning musical theatre actress. She has performed across Australia and in the West End, and is currently playing Elphaba in the Australian production of the musical Wicked, a role that she originated.
- Blake Powell – a footballer for Sydney FC
- Steve Smith – Australian international cricketer and former captain of the Australian national cricket team.
- Robert Whittaker – UFC Middleweight World Champion
- Rob Hango-Zada - Co-Founder and Joint CEO of Shippit, an e-commerce delivery platform worth $300m.
- Andrew Savvas - CEO of Motorama Group and former Executive Vice President, Chief Sales and Marketing Officer of Volkswagen North America.

== See also ==
- List of Government schools in New South Wales
