= Danny Chiha =

Lebanon international rugby league footballer

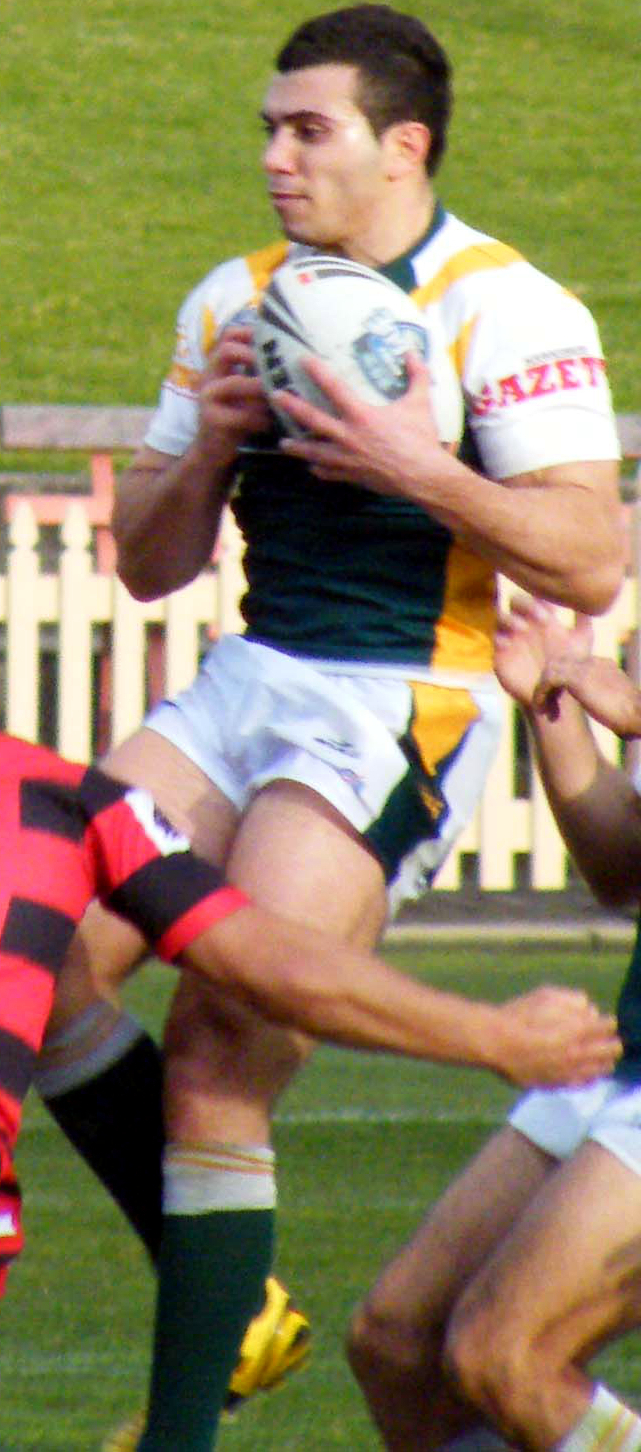

Personal information
- Full name: Daniel Chiha
- Born: 31 October 1985 (age 40) Sydney, Australia
- Height: 1.80 m (5 ft 11 in)
- Weight: 90 kg (14 st 2 lb)

Playing information
- Position: Centre
Representative
Years	Team	Pld	T	G	FG	P
2006–11	Lebanon	9	4	0	0	14

Danny Chiha (Arabic: داني شيحا) is a Lebanese rugby league footballer for the Windsor Wolves in the Jim Beam Cup and NSW Cup. He has played for the Lebanon national rugby league team, and was selected to play in the 2009 European Cup. His position of choice is at centre.

== Business career ==
Chiha is a successful accountant based in the Manly (Sydney) area
