= David Bayssari =

Lebanon international rugby league footballer & coach

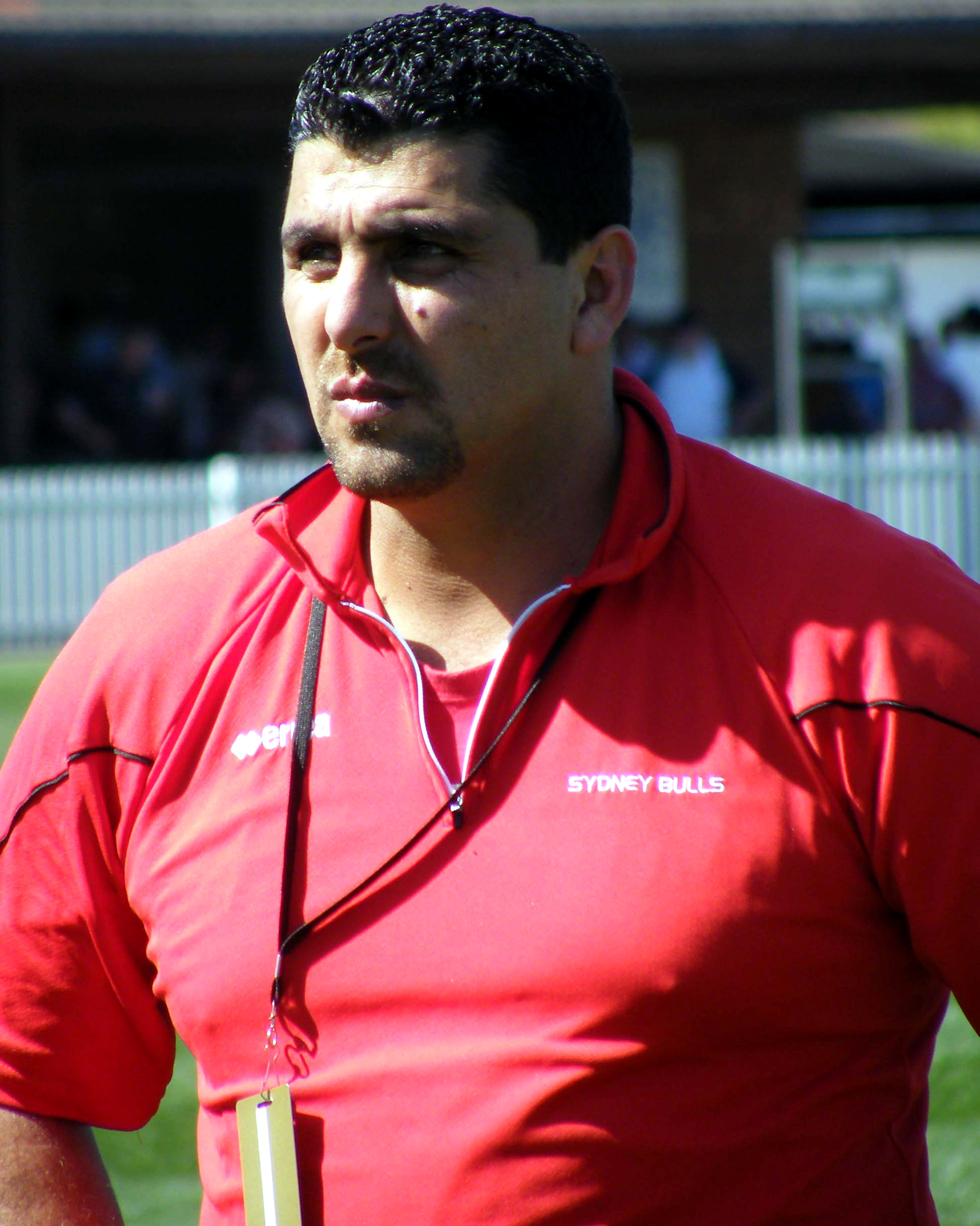

Personal information
- Full name: David Bayssari
- Born: 15 June 1970 (age 56)

Playing information
- Position: Centre, Five-eighth, Halfback
Club
Years	Team	Pld	T	G	FG	P
1991–97	Balmain Tigers	93	14	35	0	126

Coaching information
Representative
Years	Team	Gms	W	D	L	W%
2011–13	Lebanon	6	3	1	2	50
- Source: As of 7 February 2021

David Bayssari (born 15 June 1970) is a Lebanese former professional rugby league footballer who played first-grade for the Balmain Tigers.

== Playing career ==
Bayssari, played for the Wentworthville Magpies as a junior. In 1988, he won the Australian Schoolboys Grand Final, in that game he also won Player of the Match.

In 1991, he played his first game of first grade for Balmain which came against Canterbury-Bankstown in round 1 of the 1991 season at Leichhardt Oval.

In his 93 game career, Bayssari played a number of positions for Balmain. Bayssari's time at the club was a difficult period in Balmain's history as they missed the finals each season and finished last in 1994 which was only the fourth time a Balmain side had come last in the competition.

Bayssari also played during the period in which Balmain changed their name to the "Sydney Tigers" at the start of the Super League war and moved their home games to Parramatta Stadium. Bayssari's final game in the top grade came in round 7 of the 1997 ARL season against North Sydney which ended in a 9-7 victory for Balmain at Leichhardt Oval.

== Coaching career ==
In 1998, the year after his retirement, he went on to coach the reserve grade teams and was the assistant for the NRL team for Balmain and later on the Wests Tigers once the club had merged. He also coached the Sydney Bulls, from 2005 until 2009 in the Ron Massey Cup, making the Grand Final 4 seasons in a row and winning the premiership in 2006. From 2011 to 2013 Bayssari was the head coach of the Lebanese national side.

In 2023, Bayssari was appointed as the Assistant Coach of the Parramatta Eels Jersey Flegg team in the NSWRL Major Competitions. The following year, in 2024, he served as the Assistant Coach for the Parramatta Eels SG Ball side in the NSWRL Junior Representative program. In 2025, Bayssari returned to the NSWRL Major Competitions, once again taking on the role of Assistant Coach for the Parramatta Eels Jersey Flegg team.
