= Russian Rugby League Federation =

Sports governing body in Russia

- Федерация Регбилиг России
- Founded: 1978
- IRL affiliation: 1993
- RLEF affiliation: Full Member
- Ceased: 2010
- Responsibility: Russia
- Headquarters: 36 Leningrad Prospekt, Moscow Russia 125167
- Key people: Alexander N. Eremin (President)
- Website: rugby13.ru

(Russia)
- As of 4 April 2010

Russian Rugby League Federation (Russian: Федерация Регбилиг России, romanized: Federatsiya Regbilig Rossii) was the governing body for rugby league in Russia until 2010. It was founded in 1978 mainly as a governing body for Moscow-based teams, and became the head body for all of Russia in 1986. The Russian Rugby League Federation became affiliated to the Rugby League International Federation in 1993. In 2003 the Russia became a full test nation in rugby league.

Russian Ministry of Sports order number 21 dated 20 January 2010, expelled Rugby League from the State Register of Sports of Russia. President Alexander Eremin, board member and employees will discuss the option for the continuation of Rugby League in Russia with various government, civic and sports organizations, in particular the ministry of Sports and Rugby Union of Russia

The Russian Rugby League Federation became defunct and the Association of Rugby League Clubs (ARLK) took over the role of governing the sport in 2010.

== See also ==
- Russia national rugby league team
- Rugby league in Russia
