= Adham Al-Sqour =

Jordanian artistic gymnast (born 1994)

- Born: 29 January 1994 (age 32)

Gymnastics career
- Discipline: Men's artistic gymnastics
- Country represented: Jordan (2014)

Adham Al-Sqour (born 29 January 1994) is a Jordanian male artistic gymnast, representing his nation at international competitions. He competed at world championships, including the 2014 World Artistic Gymnastics Championships in Nanning, China.
