= George Azzi =

Lebanon rugby league player (born 1982)

Personal information
- Born: 5 May 1982 (age 42)

Playing information
- Position: Prop, second-row
Club
Years	Team	Pld	T	G	FG	P
2002	Sydney Roosters	1	0	0	0	0
Representative
Years	Team	Pld	T	G	FG	P
2002–06	Lebanon	5	4	0	0	16

George Azzi (born 5 May 1982) is a former professional rugby league player. A prop and second-row forward, Azzi represented Lebanon internationally between 2002 and 2006, scoring four tries in five matches. He also made one appearance for the Sydney Roosters during the 2002 NRL season.
