= Carlow Crusaders =

Defunct Irish rugby League team, Carlow, Ireland

The Carlow Crusaders were a rugby league team based in Carlow, Ireland. They competed in the Irish Elite League and played their home games at Oak Park in, Carlow. However, due to Oak Park being owned and used by Carlow RFC, the Crusaders were compelled to play most of their matches at Cill Dara RFC, Kildare.

In September 2008, Carlow Crusaders defeated the Treaty City Titans 24–8 to win the Carnegie League grand final.

On 9 July 2011, Carlow Crusaders were scheduled to compete in the All Ireland Final. The match was cancelled due to Carlow's failure to travel. Subsequently, in August, an independent disciplinary panel found Carlow guilty of bringing the game into disrepute. A statement regarding their appeal against this decision was released in October 2011.

== Honours ==
- Irish Elite League (1): 2008

== See also ==
- Rugby League Ireland
