= Charlie Farah =

Lebanese rugby league footballer

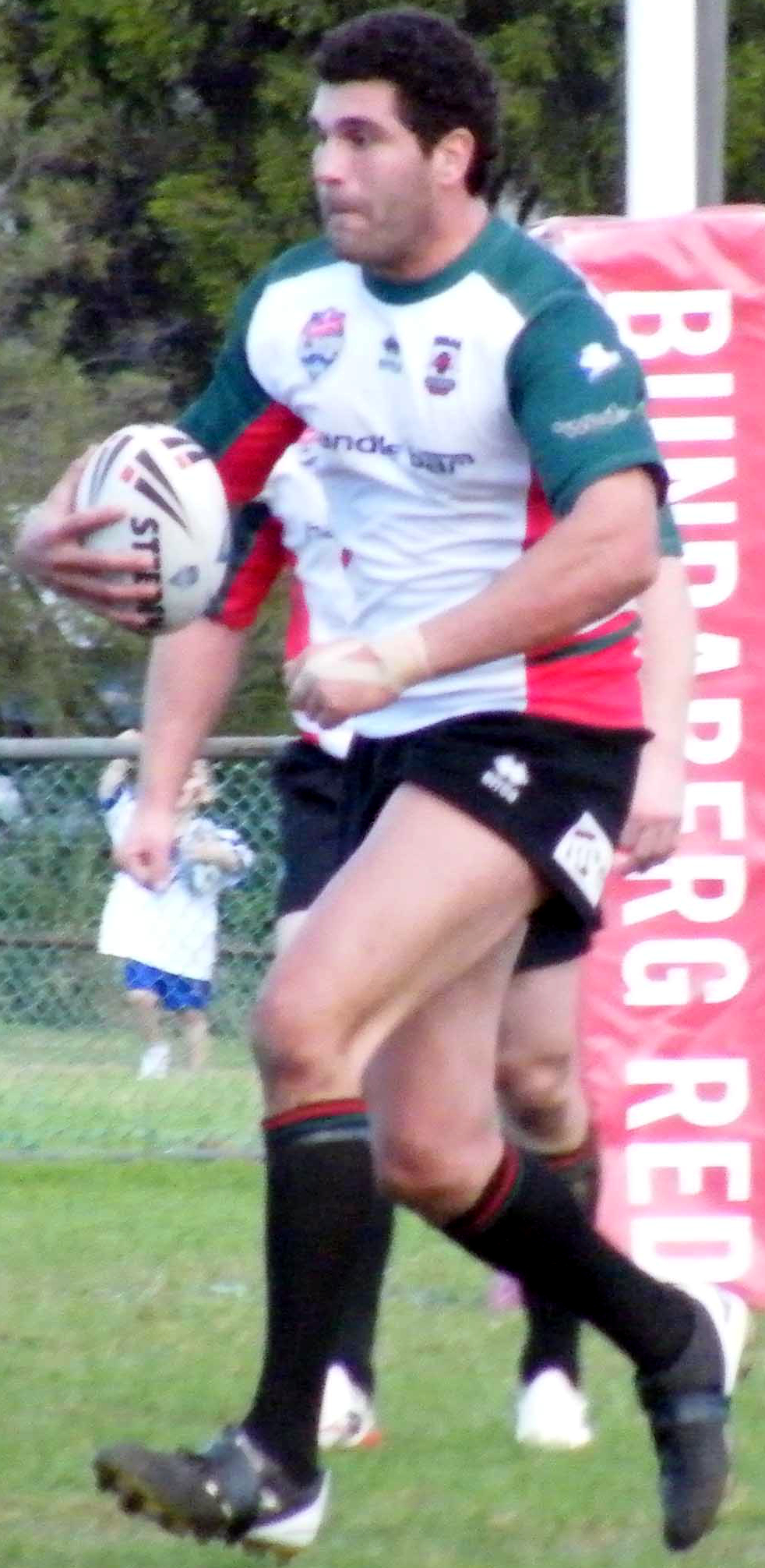

Personal information
- Full name: Charles Farah
- Weight: 18 st 0 lb (114 kg)

Playing information
- Position: Prop
Representative
Years	Team	Pld	T	G	FG	P
2002–13	Lebanon	10	5	0	0	20
- Source: As of 11 January 2023

Charlie Farah is a former Lebanese international rugby league footballer who has played for the Sydney Bulls in the Ron Massey Cup. He played as a prop.

Farah is a Lebanese international, making ten appearances between 2002 and 2013. Farah is the cousin of former Lebanese and Australian representative Robbie Farah.
