= Adham El Zabedieh =

Lebanese rugby league player

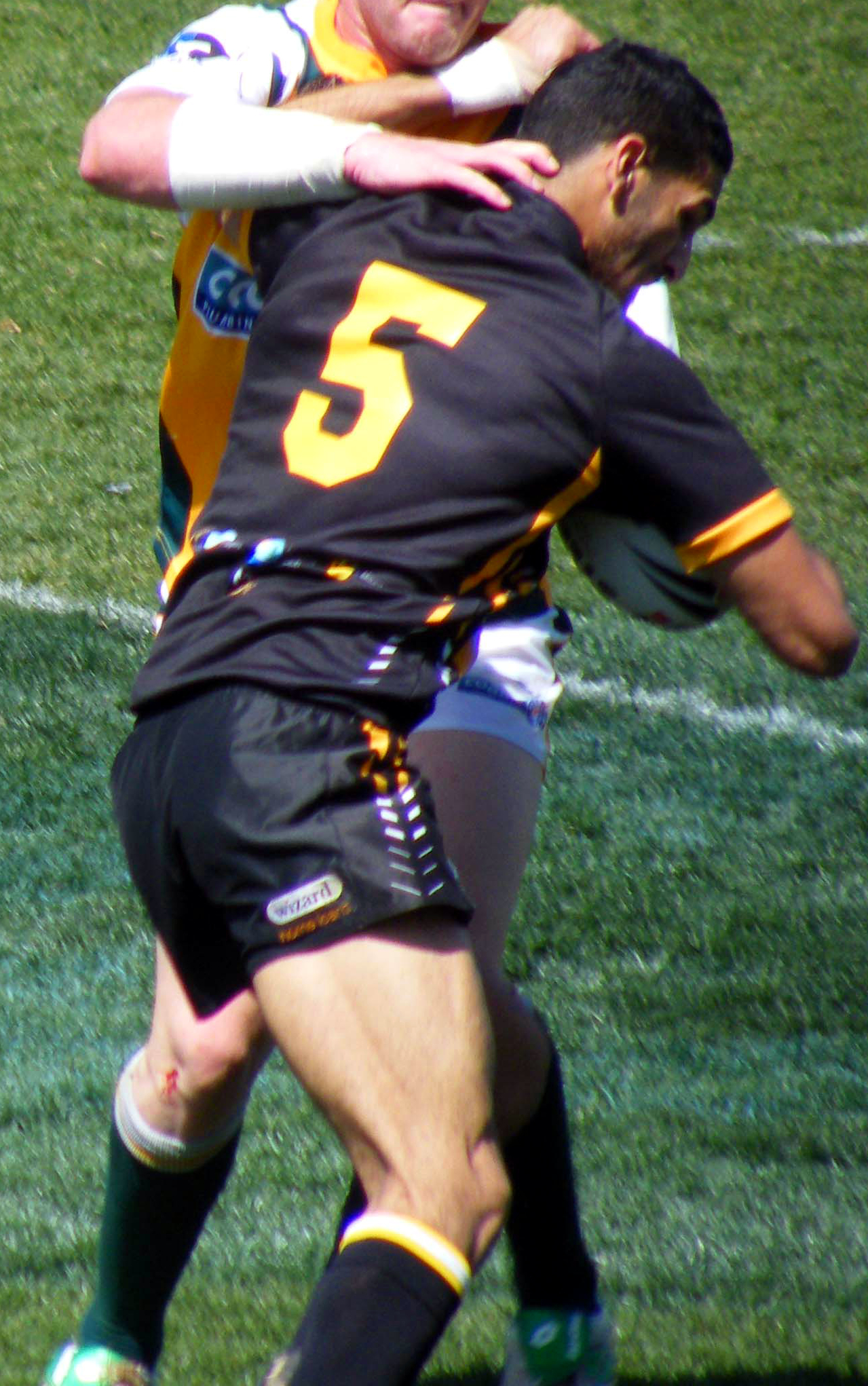

Playing information
- Position: Wing
Representative
Years	Team	Pld	T	G	FG	P
2006–15	Lebanon	12	8	0	0	32
- Source: As of 14 September 2016

Adham El Zabedieh is a Lebanese professional rugby league footballer who most recently played as winger for the Mount Pritchard Mounties in the New South Wales Cup.

El Zabedieh is a Lebanese international.
