= Danny Barakat =

Lebanon international rugby league footballer

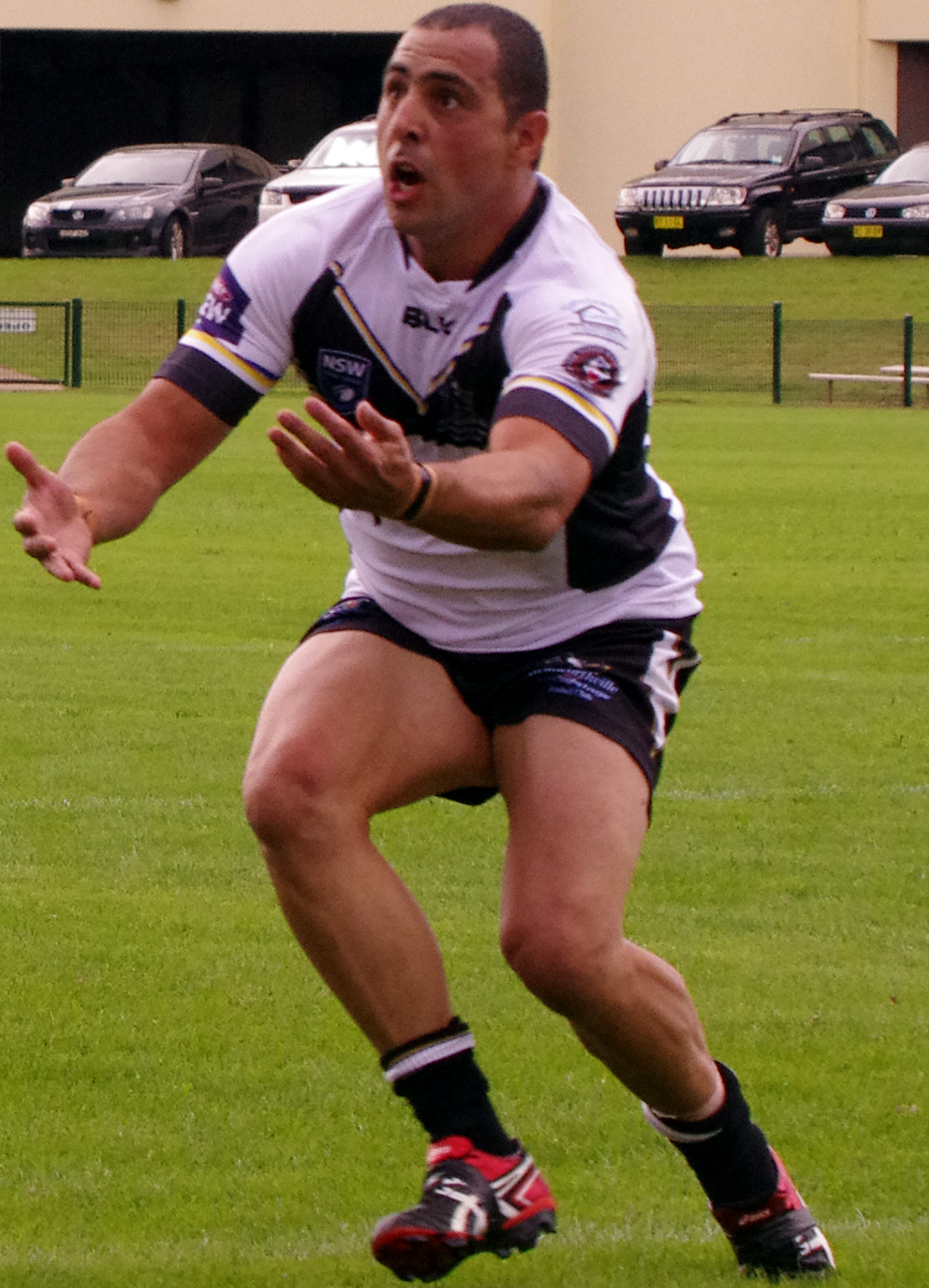

Personal information
- Full name: Daniel Barakat
- Born: 17 September 1981 (age 43); Lebanon

Playing information
- Position: Centre, Hooker, Fullback
Representative
Years	Team	Pld	T	G	FG	P
2011–17	Lebanon	4	5	0	0	20
- Source: As of 9 September 2016

Daniel Barakat is a Lebanese international rugby league footballer who has played as a centre for the Wentworthville Magpies in the Ron Massey Cup. He plays.

Barakat scored two tries in Wentworthville's 38-4 victory over Auburn Warriors in The 2017 Ron Massey Cup grand final.

Barakat is a Lebanese international.
