= RLI Premiership =

- Current season, competition or edition: 2025 Rugby League Ireland season
- Sport: Rugby league
- Founded: 1997; 29 years ago
- No. of teams: 5
- Country: Ireland
- Most recent champion: Banbridge Broncos (2025)
- Most titles: Treaty City Titans (8 titles)
- Level on pyramid: 1
- Website: rli.ie

The RLI Premiership is the top tier of domestic rugby league in Ireland founded in 1997.

The competition was founded as the "All-Ireland Challenge Cup", and has undergone many name changed in history having also been named the "All-Ireland League", "Irish Elite League", "All-Ireland Championship", and "All-Ireland Rugby League Championship" before being named its current title.

== History ==
The first domestic rugby league club in Ireland were the Dublin Blues. They were a club founded in 1989 by Brian Corrigan.

Following the formation of the Ireland national side in 1995 a league competition was mooted to aid further development. In 1997, the first Rugby League tournament began in Ireland. Under the title "All-Ireland Challenge Cup" eight clubs, Belfast Buccaneers, Tallaght Tigers, Churchtown Warriors, East Coast Panthers (from Bray), Bangor Vikings, Dublin Blues, Northside Saints, and Cork Bulls chased the first ever title. Fittingly the oldest club Dublin Blues lifted the trophy.

Northside Saints (from Dublin) won the following season before Dublin Blues won the title for the second time. 2000 brought victory for another Dublin club in Churchtown Warriors before Cork Bulls briefly ended the Dubliners dominance. Dublin City Exiles won the first of two consecutive titles, both against Dublin Blues in 2002.

Clontarf Bulls were surprise winners in 2004, the next campaign saw the emergence of Treaty City Titans (from Limerick) as a truly dominant force they would go on and win six of the next seven championships, many of which saw them go undefeated. In the season they didn't win they were runner-up to Carlow Crusaders in 2008 a side they had beaten in the previous two finals.

During this time, in 2006, the competition moved away from the provincial league system with national playoffs to pursue a single national league.

In 2010, the field Country Cowboys won their first title in 2012, it was back to the norm in 2013 as Treaty City Titans lifted their 7th title.

The Titans had to settle for runners-up the next season as Barnhall Butchers won for the first time. Treaty City Titans after an indifferent campaign won again in 2015 and in 2016 we were guaranteed a new name on the trophy as debutant finalists Galway Tribesmen overcame 2012 runners-up Ballynahinch Rabbitohs.

In 2015, only 56% of fixtures were completely, with a slight rise to 67% in 2016. Several clubs returned from hiatus in 2017 due to a financial boost caused by the national team qualifying for the 2017 World Cup.

== Current teams (2025) ==
Club	Location
Dublin City Exiles	(Republic of Ireland) Dublin
Banbridge Broncos	(Northern Ireland) Banbridge
Galway Tribesmen	(Republic of Ireland) Galway
Longhorns RL	(Republic of Ireland) Dublin
Cork Bulls	(Republic of Ireland) Cork

== List of finals ==
List of finals
Year	Winning team	Score	Losing team	Ref.
1997	Dublin Blues	–	Tallaght Tigers	
1998	Northside Saints	48–24	Dublin Blues	
1999	Dublin Blues	24–18	Cork Bulls	
2000	Churchtown Warriors	–		
2001	Cork Bulls	16–12	Dublin City Exiles	
2002	Dublin City Exiles	26–18	Dublin Blues	
2003	Dublin City Exiles	28–26	Dublin Blues	
2004	Clontarf Bulls	32–30	Dublin Blues	
2005	Treaty City Titans	36–30	Kildare Dragons	
2006	Treaty City Titans	24–10	Carlow Crusaders	
2007	Treaty City Titans	38–22	Carlow Crusaders	
2008	Carlow Crusaders	24–8	Treaty City Titans	
2009	Treaty City Titans	33–26	Carlow Crusaders	
2010	Treaty City Titans	52–24	Dublin City Exiles	
2011	Treaty City Titans	w/o	Carlow Crusaders	
2012	Country Cowboys	28–24	Ballynahinch Rabbitohs	
2013	Treaty City Titans	36–16	Dublin City Exiles	
2014	Barnhill Butchers	25–24	Treaty City Titans	
2015	Treaty City Titans	28–18	Longhorns RL	
2016	Galway Tribesmen	36–34	Ballynahinch Rabbitohs	
2017	Longhorns RL	46–6	Belfast Met Scholars	
2018	Longhorns RL	w/o	Belfast Stags	
2019	Longhorns RL	38–16	Dublin City Exiles	
2020	Longhorns RL	24–10	Galway Tribesmen	
2021	Galway Tribesmen	30–16	Dublin City Exiles	
2022	Dublin City Exiles	38–8	Longhorns	
2023	Banbridge Broncos	30–22	Galway Tribesmen	
2024	Longhorns RL	32-16	Galway Tribesmen	
2025	Banbridge Broncos	30-12	Longhorns RL	

=== Winners by club ===
#	Club	No.	Year(s)
1	Treaty City Titans	8	2005, 2006, 2007, 2009, 2010, 2011, 2013, 2015
2	Longhorns RL	5	2017, 2018, 2019, 2020, 2024
3	Dublin City Exiles	3	2002, 2003, 2022
4	Dublin Blues	2	1997, 1999
4	Galway Tribesmen	2	2016, 2021
4	Banbridge Broncos	2	2023, 2025
7	Barnhill Butchers	1	2014
7	Carlow Crusaders	1	2008
7	Churchtown Warriors	1	2000
7	Clontarf Bulls	1	2004
7	Cork Bulls	1	2001
7	Country Cowboys	1	2012
7	Northside Saints	1	1998

== See also ==
- Rugby league in Ireland
- List of rugby league competitions
