= Cork Bulls =

Irish rugby league team based in Cork

Club information
- Full name: Cork Bulls RLFC
- Colours: Navy; White
- Founded: 2010; 16 years ago
- Website: Cork Bulls RLFC Facebook

Current details
- Ground: Douglas RFC, Castletreasure, Cork
- Competition: All-Ireland Rugby League Championship

The Cork Bulls are an Irish rugby league team based in Cork, Ireland. They play in the All-Ireland Rugby League Championship.

An early iteration of the Bulls competed in the 2001 Challenge Cup as Irish champions. They were beaten 35-18 by Dewsbury Celtic in the first round. The Cork Bulls were re-formed in 2010. In 2025, the club reached the All-Ireland Premiership semi-final.

== Honours ==
- Irish Elite League (1): 2001
