= Dublin City Exiles =

Irish rugby league club

Club information
- Full name: Dublin City Exiles RLFC
- Colours: Green Black Gold White
- Founded: 2000; 26 years ago
- Website: dublincityexilesrlfc.blogspot.com

Current details
- Ground: Terenure College RFC
- Competition: Irish Elite League (Leinster Conference)

The Dublin City Exiles are an Irish rugby league team from Dublin, Ireland. The Exiles play in the Leinster Conference of the Irish Elite League. They play their home games at Lakelands Park in Terenure.

== History ==
The Dublin City Exiles were formed in 2000 by a number of Australian expatriates based in Dublin. Rugby League Ireland (the governing body for the development of rugby league in Ireland) was formed the same year, and in the first RLI season the Exiles reached the 2001 All Ireland final. The club, competing in the Leinster Conference of the Ireland National League, went on to win the 2002 and 2003 All Ireland finals.

Over the years, a number of players from the club have received caps for (or been named in training squad for) the Ireland men's national rugby league team. As of May 2024, the Exiles are one of two rugby league teams in Dublin.

In February 2023, the exiles became the first Irish team to win a Challenge Cup tie beating Hammersmith Hills Hoists 42-8.

== Honours ==
- Irish Elite League (3): 2002, 2003, 2023
