= Vereya, Naro-Fominsky District, Moscow Oblast =

Town in Moscow Oblast, Russia

Vereya Верея
- Town
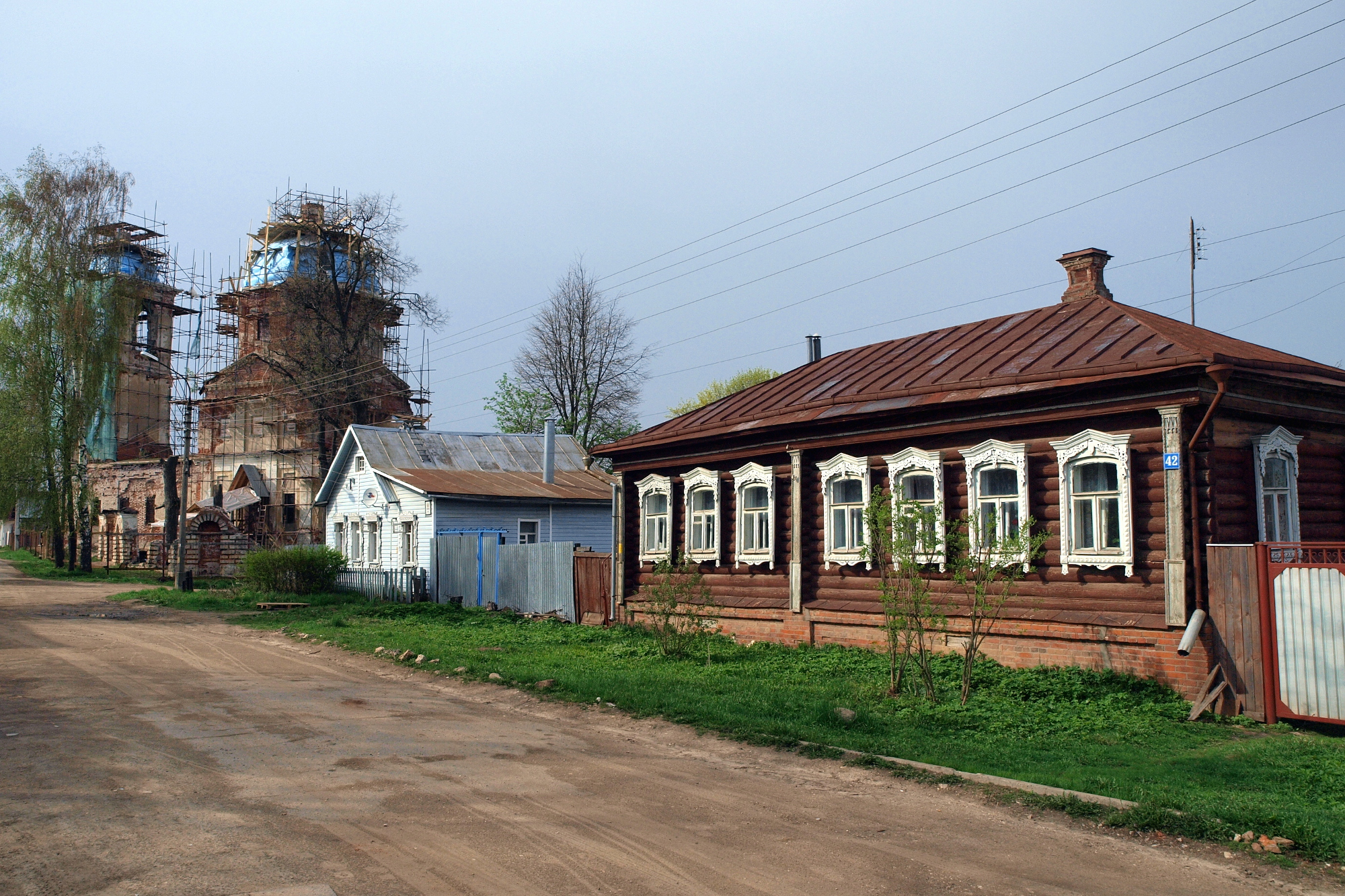
- Kirovskaya Street in Vereya

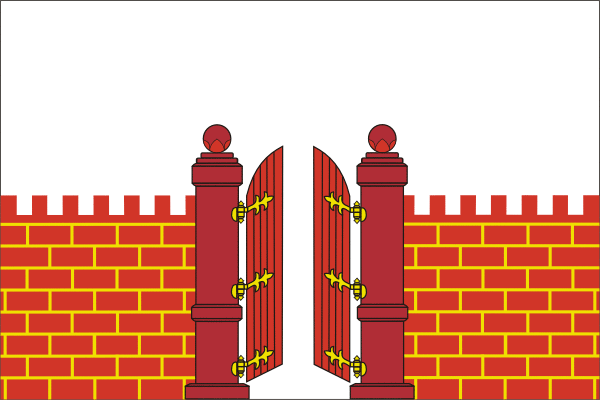
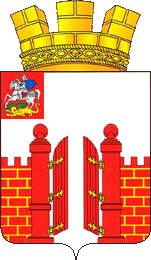
- Flag Coat of arms
- Interactive map of Vereya
- Location of Vereya Vereya (Moscow Oblast)
- Coordinates: 55°21′N 36°12′E
- Country: Russia
- Federal subject: Moscow Oblast
- Administrative district: Naro-Fominsky District
- TownSelsoviet: Vereya
- First mentioned: 1371
- Elevation: 190 m (620 ft)

Population (2010 Census)
  - Total: 5,368
  - Estimate (2025): 4,836 (−9.9%)

Administrative status
  - Capital of: Town of Vereya

Municipal status
  - Municipal district: Naro-Fominsky Municipal District
  - Urban settlement: Vereya Urban Settlement
  - Capital of: Vereya Urban Settlement
- Time zone: UTC+3 (MSK)
- Postal code: 143330
- OKTMO ID: 46750000011
- Website: vereya-mo.ru

Vereya (Russian: Вере́я) is a town in Naro-Fominsky District of Moscow Oblast, Russia, located on the right bank of the Protva River 113 kilometers (70 mi) southwest of Moscow. Population: 5,368 (2010 census); 4,957 (2002 census); 5,606 (1989 Soviet census); 6,500 (1969).

== History ==
It was first mentioned in a chronicle in 1371. During the following century, Vereya was the seat of the tiny Vereya Principality, ruled by a lateral branch of the Muscovite Rurikids. The last prince of Vereya was married to Sophia Palaiologina's Greek niece. He escaped to the Grand Duchy of Lithuania and married his daughter Sophia to Stanislovas Goštautas.

== Administrative and municipal status ==
Within the framework of administrative divisions, it is, together with nineteen rural localities, incorporated within Naro-Fominsky District as the Town of Vereya. As a municipal division, the Town of Vereya is incorporated within Naro-Fominsky Municipal District as Vereya Urban Settlement.

== Architecture ==
The Nativity Cathedral in the local kremlin was commissioned by Vladimir of Staritsa to commemorate the conquest of Kazan in 1552. It was extensively rebuilt at the turn of the 18th century; a lofty Neoclassical belltower was erected in 1802. The oldest parish church goes back to 1667–1679.

== Sports ==
The town has a rugby league team, the Vereya Bears, who play in the Russian Championship.

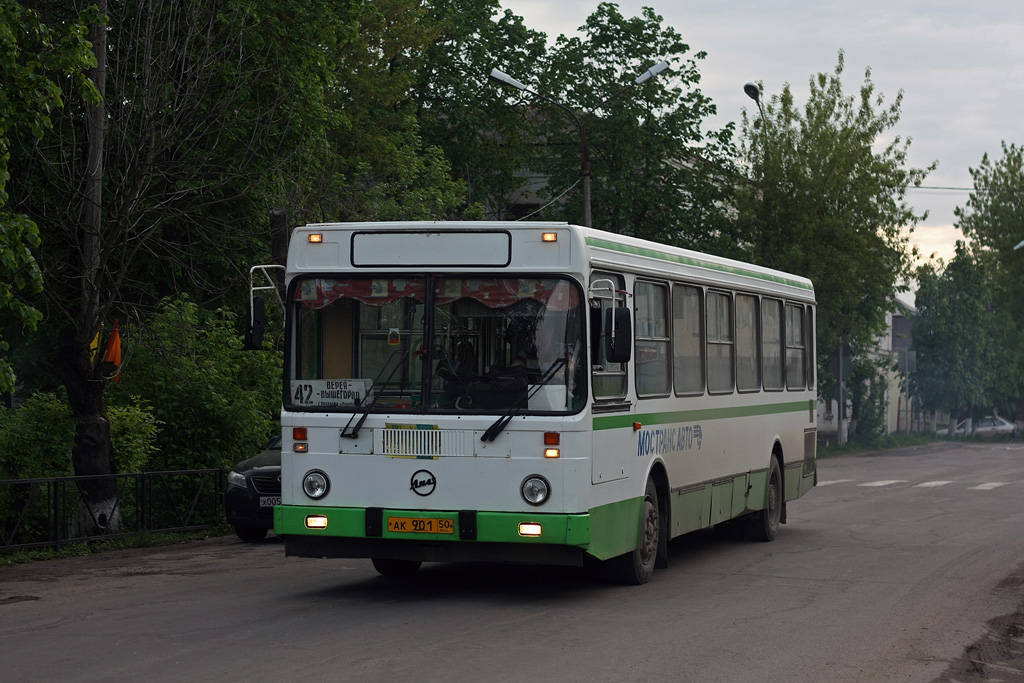
LiAZ-5256 bus
