= Zoran Pešić (rugby league) =

Serbia international professional rugby league footballer

Zoran Pesic
Personal information
- Full name: Zoran Pesic
- Born: 14 July 1983 (age 41); Pančevo, Serbia
- Height: 164 cm (5 ft 5 in)
- Weight: 85 kg (13 st 5 lb)

Playing information
- Position: Hooker, Second-row
Club
Years	Team	Pld	T	G	FG	P
	London Skolars
	Eastmoor Dragons
	Warrington Wizards
	Red Star Rugby League Club
	Lyon Villeurbanne XIII
	RC Carpentras XIII
	Total	0	0	0	0	0
Representative
Years	Team	Pld	T	G	FG	P
2005–15	Serbia	25	16	0	0	64
- As of 18 February 2021

Zoran Pešić (born 14 July 1983) is a Serbian rugby league footballer, who currently plays for French club RC Carpentras XIII in the Elite Two Championship. He plays mainly at Hooker. He has represented Serbia many times, and played at club level for London Skolars, Eastmoor Dragons, Warrington Wizards, Red Star Rugby League Club and Lyon Villeurbanne XIII.
