= Vereya Bears =

Russian rugby league club, based in Moscow

Vereya Bears are a rugby league team from Vereya, Moscow Oblast. The club was first formed in 1995 and now play in the Russian Championship. Home matches are played at the Vereya Stadium.

== Formation ==
Following the arrival of rugby league in Moscow in 1991, the sport began to grow outwards. Vereya were established in 1995 as part of this expansion, but did not register until 1998. They adopted the name "Bears".

== Russian Championship ==
The club debuted in Russian Championship XII and finished fourth. Since then they have hovered around that place. The Bears had never been able to break up the stronger Moscow clubs until Russian Championship XVII when they finished second. The Bears won their fourth successive Russian Championship in 2013. They lost to Lokomotiv in the 2014 final, then won the title again in 2015.

== Challenge Cup ==
After their second-placed finish in Russian Championship XVII the Bears were entered into the 2008 Challenge Cup. They were entered into the Second Round of the competition and flew over to England to face amateur club Leigh Miners Rangers. They were defeated 64-12 and so were knocked out of the competition.

== Staff ==
- Edgard Tatouryan, President & Head Coach
- Sergey Kashutin, Manager

== Junior Development ==
There are over 200 children in various Vereya Bears youth teams.

== See also ==
- Rugby league in Russia
