= Rugby league in the Netherlands =

- Country: Netherlands
- Governing body: Netherlands Rugby League Bond
- National teams: Men; Women

National competitions
- Rugby League European Championship D

Club competitions
- NRLB Championship

Rugby league is a minor sport in the Netherlands.

The men's national team played their first match in 2003 against Scotland A, and the women's team made their debut in 2023.

The main domestic competition is the Nederlandse Rugby League Bond Championship initially played in the 2015 season as a joint Dutch-Belgian competition.

== History ==
=== Introduction ===
The Netherlands Amateur Rugby League was established in November 1998 with Hans Modderman as its first president. The following year a Dutch team took part in the Tertiary Student Rugby League World Cup and as part of their build up to the tournament they played against the French Army at the Royal Military Academy in Breda. This was one of the earliest games to be played in the Netherlands, though the NNRLB website notes Hemel Hempstead also having toured during this era.

The 1989 World Cup was held in York and including eight teams: the four Home Nations plus Australia, New Zealand, France and the Netherlands. In the group games the Dutch were defeated by Wales (10-48), France (12-42) and New Zealand (16-50). The Cup seventh vs eight final was left in which Scotland defeated the Netherlands (10-20).

After that tournament there was a follow-up in November 1989 in Toulouse (France). The Dutch played against Toulouse Olympique which ended in a draw (20-20).

=== NNRLB era ===
It took till 2003 before the next game took place when two Netherlands sides hosted two national touring sides from Scotland. The first 13-a-side club game of Rugby League was also played in 2003 with Den Haag side Te Werve hosting Essex Eels. Also during 2003 a South Holland representative side played in the York International 9s.

Their first entry into major competitions was in 2005 when the Netherlands entered the qualifying tournament for the 2005 European Nations Cup, losing to Georgia 34–14 but beating Serbia 26–10.

The Netherlands competed in the 2008 Rugby League World Cup qualifying competition alongside Russia, Georgia and Serbia. The team lost to Russia and Georgia before beating Serbia to come third in the group. The third-place finish was not enough to see the Netherlands progress in the competition.

On 8 August 2009, the Netherlands XIII including 8 players from the Nootdorp Panthers, as well as others from Gouda and Capelle, played against the Oxford University Old Boys. They tied 36–36, in front of 300 spectators at Nootdorp.

=== NRLB era ===
The Netherlands Rugby League Bond (NRLB) was formed in 2009 and hosted rugby league nines tournaments periodically. The NRLB became a Rugby League European Federation observer member in February 2012. The Amsterdam Cobras and Rotterdam Pitbulls played a two-match friendly series in 2014.

The first full competition, known as the BNRL Championship, or the BENE Cup, was held in 2015. It consisted of three Dutch clubs and Belgian club, North Brussels Gorillas, who won the grand final. This was North Brussels only season competing in the Dutch competition. The competition became the Nederlandse Rugby League Bond Championship the following season.

The NRLB obtained affiliate membership of the RLEF in June 2017.

In 2021, the men's national team won the 2021 Rugby League European Championship D. The women's national team made their debut against Greece in 2023.

== Competitions ==
Location of teams in the NRLB

As of 2025, the NRLB Championship is contested by six clubs.

| Club | City | Joined | Titles |
|---|---|---|---|
| Amsterdam Cobras | Amsterdam | 2015 | 2018, 2023 |
| Brabant Bears | Oisterwijk | 2024 | 2024 |
| Den Haag Knights | The Hague | 2015 | 2019 |
| Harderwijk Dolphins | Harderwijk | 2017 | |
| Rotterdam Pitbulls | Rotterdam | 2015 | 2016, 2017 |
| Zwolle Wolves | Zwolle | 2022 | |
