= 2006 in rugby league =

This article contains information on rugby league played in 2006. The season commenced with the World Club Challenge in England in February and concluded with the Tri-Nations Final in Australia in November.

== January ==
=== World Club Challenge ===
Bradford Bulls won the one-off match against Wests Tigers 30–10 at Galpharm Stadium, Huddersfield.

Bradford Bulls	30–10	Wests Tigers	3/2/2006 20:00 – Galpharm Stadium, Huddersfield; Ref: Steve Ganson (England); Attendance: 19,207
Tries: Stuart Fielden (2), Marcus Bai (2), Stanley Gene		Tries: Daniel Fitzhenry, Brett Hodgson	3/2/2006 20:00 – Galpharm Stadium, Huddersfield; Ref: Steve Ganson (England); Attendance: 19,207
Goals: Iestyn Harris (5)		Goals: Brett Hodgson (1)	3/2/2006 20:00 – Galpharm Stadium, Huddersfield; Ref: Steve Ganson (England); Attendance: 19,207

== February ==
=== National Rugby League trial matches ===
==== Week 1 ====
- Brisbane def. Nth Qld 36–4. Rockhampton, NSW. 11/2/2006. Report
- Canberra def. New Zealand 28–16. Auckland, New Zealand. Report
- Melbourne def. Parramatta 38–18. Ballina, NSW. 11/2/2006 report

==== Week 2 ====
South Sydney Rabbitohs and the St George Illawarra Dragons played their annual Charity Shield match. The Rabbitohs narrowly took the shield with a score of 14–12, while most of the Dragons' top grade players were being rested on the bench in preparation for weeks to come.

South Sydney	14–12	St George Illawarra	18 February 2006 20:00 – Telstra Stadium, Sydney; Ref: Steve Clark; Attendance: 24,566
Tries: Paul Mellor, Shannon Hegarty, David Fa'alogo		Tries: Trent Barrett, Ben Hornby	18 February 2006 20:00 – Telstra Stadium, Sydney; Ref: Steve Clark; Attendance: 24,566
Goals: Ben Walker (1)		Goals: Wes Naiqama (2)	18 February 2006 20:00 – Telstra Stadium, Sydney; Ref: Steve Clark; Attendance: 24,566

Other results from this week of trials included:

- Brisbane def. Canberra 28–20. Port Macquarie, NSW.
- Cronulla def. Canterbury 34–30. Mollymook, NSW.
- Nth Qld def. New Zealand 26–10. Cairns, Qld. Crowd: c. 15,000.
- Parramatta def. Melbourne 30–24. Exies Oval, Griffith, NSW. Crowd: 6,831.
- Penrith def. Newcastle 38–30. Alice Springs, NT.
- Sydney def. Manly 44–14. Central Coast Stadium, Gosford, NSW. Crowd: c. 10,000.

==== Week 3 ====
- Manly def. Wests 42–18. Brookvale Oval, Sydney, NSW.
- Melbourne def. Brisbane 58–10. Toowoomba Stadium, Toowoomba, QLD.
- New Zealand def. Canterbury 24–20. Carrara Stadium, Gold Coast, Qld.
- Newcastle def. Cronulla 22–4
- North Queensland def. Souths 42–0
- Penrith def. Parramatta 26–14. Regional Stadium, Port Macquarie, NSW.
- Sydney def. St George Illawarra 16–12. WIN Stadium, Wollongong, NSW.

== May ==
5 - Brisbane, Australia: The 2006 ANZAC Test is played at Suncorp Stadium between Australia and New Zealand is won by the Kangaroos 50-12.
12 - Dubbo, Australia: In the annual City vs Country Origin match, Country NSW defeated City NSW 12–10 at Apex Oval before a crowd of 11,423.

== July ==
5 July - Telstra Dome, Melbourne, Australia before a crowd of 54,833 the 2006 State of Origin series concludes with Queensland defeating New South Wales

== August ==
- 3rd – Australia: Rugby league film Footy Legends is released.

== September ==
- 21st – Sydney, Australia: The 8th annual Tom Brock Lecture, entitled The Stuff of Dreams, or the Dream Stuffed? Rugby League, Media Empires, Sex Scandals, and Global Plays is delivered by Dr. David Rowe.

== October ==
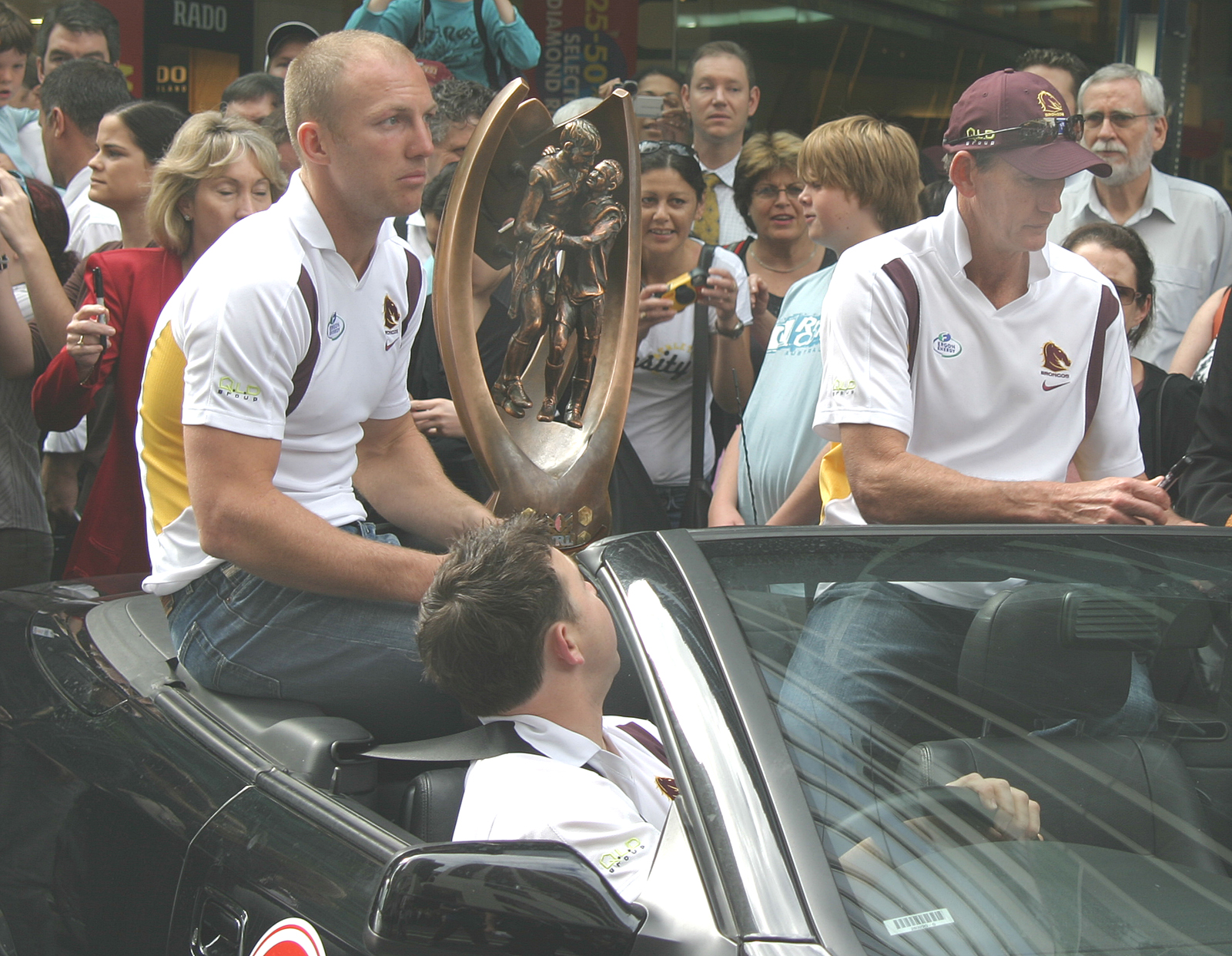
The Brisbane Broncos won the 2006 NRL premiership.

- The Brisbane Broncos win the NRL Premiership after defeating first-placed Melbourne in the Grand Final.

== November ==
- 8: Brisbane, Australia – The Great Britain national rugby league team plays against Australia for the last time, losing 10–33 at Suncorp Stadium before a crowd of 44,358

== Regular season matches ==
=== Super League XI ===
The Super League kicked off the weekend after the World Club Challenge with Hull F.C. defeating the newly promoted Castleford Tigers 42–18. This season saw the entry of Catalans Dragons, who are the first French team to compete since the demise of Paris Saint-Germain at the end of Super League II. The regular season would finish with St. Helens taking out the minor premiership and the Castleford Tigers being relegated to division one. The Super League Grand Final saw St. Helens claim a twelve championship with victory over Hull F.C. at Old Trafford in front of 73,000.

=== National Rugby League – Season 2006 ===
The 99th season of first grade rugby league in Australia was controversial before competition even began. The New Zealand Warriors were fined and penalised four competition points for salary cap breaches in 2004 and 2005. They were fined and started the season on -4 points. The season began on Friday, 10 March, when defending premiers Wests Tigers and early favourites St George Illawarra Dragons played at Telstra Stadium. Melbourne Storm won the Minor Premiership, however, lost to the Brisbane Broncos in the Grand Final in front of over 79,000.

=== Powergen Challenge Cup 2006 ===
The Powergen Rugby League Challenge Cup is the most prestigious knock-out competition in the world of Rugby League and the 2006 competition saw over a hundred clubs competing from countries including England, France, Russia, Scotland and Wales. The final would see St. Helens take victory 41–12 over the Huddersfield Giants at Twickenham Stadium in front of 65,187.

=== UK National Leagues ===
The National Leagues kicked off on 7 April. There are three divisions, and the top team in National One has the opportunity to enter SuperLeague, subject to minimum standards.

=== AMNRL – Season 2006 ===
The American National Rugby League kicked off on Wednesday 17 June with the Glen Mills Bulls defeating the Philadelphia Fight 48–26. This season saw the entry of three new competition teams the Jacksonville Axemen, New Haven Warriors and the Boston Braves. At the conclusion of the AMNRL regular season, the Glen Mills Bulls won the Minor Premiership, only to lose lost to the Connecticut Wildcats in the Grand Final Championship match in front of over 2,500.

== International ==
=== Summary ===
==== Tests ====
Country	Matches	Wins	Losses	Draws
Australia	5	4	1	0
Great Britain	2	1	1	0
New Zealand	4	1	3	0

==== Internationals ====
Country	Matches	Wins	Losses	Draws
Austria	2	1	1	0
Cook Islands	6	1	5	0
Czech Republic	1	0	1	0
Estonia	2	0	2	0
Fiji	7	4	3	0
Georgia	2	2	0	0
Germany	2	2	0	0
Italy	2	0	2	0
Lebanon	1	1	0	0
Malta	1	0	1	0
Netherlands	3	1	2	0
Māori	4	3	1	0
Russia	2	2	0	0
Samoa	5	2	3	0
Serbia	5	1	4	0
South Africa	2	2	0	0
Tokelau	3	1	2	0
Tonga	5	4	1	0
United States	1	1	0	0

==== 'A'/'B' internationals ====
Country	Matches	Wins	Losses	Draws
Fiji A	1	1	0	0
France A	1	1	0	0
France B	1	1	0	0
Greece	1	0	1	0
Ireland A	3	2	1	0
Italy A	1	1	0	0
Morocco	1	0	1	0
Scotland A	3	1	2	0
Wales A	4	1	3	0

==== Other international teams ====
Team	Description	Matches	Wins	Losses	Draws
England Lionhearts	Players from England's totalRL.com Rugby League conference and LHF Healthplan National League Three	4	4	0	0
(United Kingdom) BARLA	Players from the British Amateur Rugby League Association	2	2	0	0
Netherlands 'Tasman'	Players from clubs in the Netherlands	1	1	0	0
(Australia) Australian Prime Minister's XIII	Players form the NRL not selected for the Tri-nations series	1	1	0	0

=== Results ===
Date	Result	Venue	City	Crowd	Competition	Match
26 January	New Zealand Maori def. Fiji 12–6	Coffs Harbour International Stadium	Coffs Harbour	10,000	Orara Valley Tournament	
26 January	USA def. Japan 40–10	Coffs Harbour International Stadium	Coffs Harbour	10,000	Orara Valley Tournament	
2 February	Italy A def. USA 38–6	Marconi Stadium	Sydney	2,000	Columbus Cup	
23 February	Tonga 64 – 0 Tokelau	Ericsson Stadium	Auckland	2,000	Pacific Cup	1
23 February	Fiji 26 – 4 Samoa	Ericsson Stadium	Auckland	2,000	Pacific Cup	2
25 February	Tonga 42 – 14 New Zealand Maori	Trusts Stadium	Auckland	2,500	Pacific Cup	3
25 February	Fiji 40 – 18 Cook Islands	Trusts Stadium	Auckland	2,500	Pacific Cup	4
2 March	New Zealand Maori 64 – 4 Tokelau	Trusts Stadium	Auckland		Pacific Cup	5
2 March	Cook Islands 42 – 0 Samoa	Trusts Stadium	Auckland		Pacific Cup	6
5 March	New Zealand Maori 44 – 14 Cook Islands	Trusts Stadium	Auckland	2,000	Pacific Cup	Playoff
5 March	Tokelau 34 – 28 Samoa	Trusts Stadium	Auckland	2,000	Pacific Cup	Playoff
5 March	Tonga 22 – 4 Fiji	Trusts Stadium	Auckland	2,000	Pacific Cup	Final
28 April	Russia def. Netherlands 40–14		Hook of Holland	250	2008 World Cup qualifier	
1 May	England Lionhearts 46–6 Serbia	FK Radnički Stadium	Belgrade			
5 May	Australia def. New Zealand 50–12	Suncorp Stadium	Brisbane	44,191	ANZAC Test	
6 May	England Lionhearts 50–4 Serbia	FK Mladost Stadium	Novi Sad	400		
13 May	Georgia def. Serbia 45–10	FK Radnički Stadium	Belgrade	500	2008 World Cup qualifier	
23 May	Great Britain Police def. Belgrade 64–0	FK Radnički Stadium	Belgrade			
26 May	Georgia def. Netherlands 57–16	Locomotive Stadium	Tbilisi	10,935	2008 World Cup qualifier	
27 May	Great Britain Police def. Serbia 58–8	FK Mladost Stadium	Novi Sad			
3 June	Ireland A def. Scotland A 38–30	St Mary's RFC	Limerick		Skanska Amateur Four Nations	
4 June	Russia def. Serbia 44–6	FK Radnički Stadium	Belgrade	200	2008 World Cup qualifier	
9 June	BARLA "B" def. Italy 38–18		Monselice		Simone Franchini Memorial Tournament	
9 June	BARLA "A" def. South Africa 34–14		Monselice		Simone Franchini Memorial Tournament	
10 June	France B def. Morocco 23–16	Stade Bernard Bardin	Istres			
12 June	South Africa def. Italy 76–6		Monselice		Simone Franchini Memorial Tournament	
13 June	South Africa def. Italy 60–20		Monselice		Simone Franchini Memorial Tournament	
17 June	Netherlands def. Serbia 38–26	RC Rotterdamse	Rotterdam		2008 World Cup qualifier	
17 June	France A def. Scotland A 31–16	Pollok Park	Glasgow			
25 June	Germany def. Austria 34–32	Nonner Stadion	Bad Reichenhall	358	Central Europe Development Tri-nations	1
27 June	Great Britain def. New Zealand 46–14	Knowsley Road	St. Helens	10,103	XXXX Test	
15 July	England Lionhearts def. Ireland A 44–23	Terenure RFC	Dublin		Skanska Amateur Four Nations	
16 July	Wales A def. Scotland A 22–16	Pollok Park	Glasgow		Skanska Amateur Four Nations	
22 July	Germany d. Estonia 38–24	Viimsi Stadium	Tallinn	528	Central Europe Development Tri-nations	2
4 August	Netherlands "Tasman" def. Czech Republic 34–28	RC Rotterdamse	Rotterdam		International Cup	
12 August	Serbia def. Czech Republic 38–26	RC Sparta	Prague		Slavic Cup	
13 August	England Lionhearts def. Scotland A. 46–14	GHA Rugby Club	Glasgow		Skanska Amateur Four Nations	
19 August	Ireland A. def. Wales A 24–10	Brewery Field	Bridgend		Skanska Amateur Four Nations	
2 September	Austria def. Estonia 56–32	Stier Arena	Paternion, Carinthia	237	Central Europe Development Tri-nations	3
10 September	England Lionhearts def. Wales A 30–26	Featherstone Rovers RL	Featherstone		Skanska Amateur Four Nations	
29 September	Tonga def. Cook Islands 56–14	Cambelltown Stadium	Sydney	3,013	2008 World Cup qualifier	
29 September	Samoa def. Fiji 30–28	Cambelltown Stadium	Sydney	3,013	2008 World Cup qualifier	
30 September	Australian Prime Minister's XIII def. Papua New Guinea 28–8	Lloyd Robson Oval	Port Moresby	10,000		
4 October	Fiji def. Tonga 30–28	Western Weekender Stadium	Sydney	3,813	2008 World Cup qualifier	
4 October	Samoa def. Cook Islands 46–6	Western Weekender Stadium	Sydney	3,813	2008 World Cup qualifier	
7 October	Fiji def. Cook Islands 40–4	CUA Stadium	Sydney		2008 World Cup qualifier	
7 October	Fiji A def. Greece 34–12	OKI Jubilee Stadium	Sydney			
8 October	Lebanon def. Malta 36–10	Western Weekender Stadium	Sydney		Battle of the Phoenicians	
14 October	Australia def. New Zealand 30–18	Mt Smart Stadium	Auckland	17,887	Tri-nations	1
21 October	Australia def. New Zealand 20–15	Telstra Dome	Melbourne	30,732	Tri-nations	2
22 October	England def. France 26–10	Headingley, Leeds	5,547	Federation Shield	1	
22 October	Tonga def. Samoa 18–10	Headingley, Leeds	5,547	Federation Shield	2	
22 October	Ireland def. Russia 50–12	Sili Stadium	Moscow		2008 World Cup qualifier	
25 October	Cumbria def. Tonga 28–16	Derwent Park	Workington	1,639	Friendly	
28 October	Lebanon def. Russia 22–8	New River Stadium	London		2008 World Cup qualifier	
28 October	USA def. Japan 54–18	Aston Community Center Field	Aston		2008 World Cup qualifier	
28 October	Greece def. Serbia 44–26	Glyka Nera Football Club	Athens	150	Friendly	
28 October	New Zealand def. Great Britain 18–14	Jade Stadium	Christchurch	17,005	Tri-nations	3
29 October	Scotland def. Wales 21–14	Brewery Field	Bridgend	2,378	2008 World Cup qualifier	
29 October	France def. Samoa 28–6	Benichou Stadium	Colomiers		Federation Shield	3
29 October	England def. Tonga 40–18	Twickenham Stoop	London		Federation Shield	4
4 November	Great Britain def. Australia 23–12	Sydney Football Stadium	Sydney	24,953	Tri-nations	4
5 November	Ireland tied with Lebanon 18–18	Tolka Park	Dublin		2008 World Cup qualifier	
5 November	Tonga def. France 48–10	Municipal Stadium Pierre Antoine	Castres		Federation Shield	5
5 November	England def. Samoa 38–14	KC Stadium	Hull	5,698	Federation Shield	6
11 November	New Zealand 34 – 4 Great Britain	Westpac Stadium	Wellington		Tri-nations	5
12 November	England 32 – 14 Tonga	Halton Stadium	Widnes		Federation Shield	Final
18 November	Australia 33 – 10 Great Britain	Suncorp Stadium	Brisbane	44,358	Tri-nations	6
25 November	Australia 16 – 12 New Zealand	Sydney Football Stadium	Sydney		Tri-nations	Final

== Births ==
- 15 January - Kaiden Lahrs, Australia

== Sources ==
=== Trial matches ===
- "Noble hails Bradford team effort", BBC website. Retrieved 8 May 2006
- "2006 Charity Shield", Rleague.com website. Retrieved 8 May 2006
- "2006 NRL Trials", Rleague.com website. Retrieved 8 May 2006

=== State of Origin ===
- "Ring-in Finch saves the day for Blues". Sydney Morning Herald.

=== International ===
- "Lionhearts Jet Off to Serbia", England Lionhearts website. Retrieved 8 May 2006
- "Serbia 6 England Lionhearts 46", England Lionhearts website. Retrieved 8 May 2006
- "Serbia 4 England Lionhearts 50", England Lionhearts website. Retrieved 8 May 2006
- "Aussies crush NZ in Johns finale", BBC website. Retrieved 8 May 2006
- "World Cup European Preliminary Qualifying Tournament – Euro B", Rugby League European Federation website. Retrieved 8 May 2006
- "Pacific Cup 2006 Results", New Zealand Rugby League website. Retrieved 8 May 2006
- "Lions to face Kiwis in June Test", BBC website. Retrieved 8 May 2006
- "Competitions and Results", Rugby League European Federation website. Retrieved 8 May 2006
- "NZ-Great Britain league match 'no Test'". Sydney Morning Herald.
- "Kiwis insist it's a Test". The Adelaide Advertiser.
- "Rugby League World Cup 2008 – European Qualifying Group", Rugby League European Federation website. Retrieved 15 May 2006
- "Kiwis Get Caps for XXXX Test", Sporting Life. Retrieved 24 May 2006
- "GB Police Set For Serbia", Rugby League European Federation website. Retrieved 24 May 2006
- "Belgrade Cup", Rugby League European Federation website. Retrieved 25 May 2006
- "Impressive Georgia Outrun Dutch in 2nd Half", Rugby League European Federation website. Retrieved 28 May 2006
- "European Preliminary Qualifying Group – Match 4", Rugby League European Federation website. Retrieved 5 June 2006
- "BARLA set for Italy", British Amateur Rugby League Association website. Retrieved 6 June 2006
- "Upcoming tours", South African Rugby League website. Retrieved 6 June 2006
- "2006 Wales A Fixtures and Results", Cymru Rugby League website. Retrieved 7 June 2006
- "Scottish Wilt Under Irish Heat", Scotland Rugby League website. Retrieved 7 June 2006
- "France Make Historic Trip To Glasgow", Scotland Rugby League website. Retrieved 8 June 2006
- "BARLA convincingly wins their double header against Italy and South Africa", Rugby League European Federation website. Retrieved 12 June 2006
- "Scotland A v. France Federale", Rugby League European Federation website. Retrieved 20 June 2006
- "Euro Development Tri-nations", Rugby League European Federation website. Retrieved 27 June 2006
- "Great Britain 46–14 New Zealand", bbc.co.uk website. Retrieved 28 June 2006.
- "European Federation Development International", Rugby League European Federation website. Retrieved 11 July 2006
- "Wolfhound A v. Lionheart A Match Report", Rugby League Ireland website. Retrieved 19 July 2006.
- "Defensive Heroics Not Enough For 'A' Team", Scotland Rugby League website. Retrieved 19 July 2006.
- "Estonia 24 Germany 38 – Tallinn", Rugby League European Federation website. Retrieved 26 July 2006
- "Rugby League World Cup Pacific Qualifiers Loom", Pacific Magazine Website. Retrieved 13 August 2006.
- "Slavic Cup", Rugby League European Federation website. Retrieved 14 August 2006
- "Bravehearts well beaten by Lionhearts", Scotland Rugby League website. Retrieved 16 August 2006
- "England set for new tournament", bbc.co.uk website. Retrieved 18 August 2006.
- "PNG Kumuls to play Australian PM's 13", The National website. Retrieved 23 August 2006.
- "Wolfhounds A triumph in Wales", Rugby League Ireland website. Retrieved 23 August 2006.
- "Italy overcome a gallant USA team", Italia RL XIII website. Retrieved 23, August 2006.
- "New Europe-Pacific tournament for Mate Ma’a Tonga", Matangi Tonga Online, 29 August 2006. Retrieved 29 August 2006.
- "RLEF Development Tri-nations", Rugby League European Federation website. Retrieved 4 September 2004.
- "England A 30 Wales A 26", Cymru Rugby League website. Retrieved 20 September 2006.
