= Wales A national rugby league team =

Wales A, also known as Wales Dragonhearts, is an amateur international rugby league side that competed in the Amateur Four Nations. The players are picked from the Conference League South clubs and from the domestic competition the South Wales Premiership league.

Wales have been the most successful side in this competition, winning the competition 8 times during its 12-year run. In 2014, a new competition the Celtic Nations Cup was contested by Wales A, Ireland A and Scotland A following England A withdrawal. Wales A are currently coached by Dafydd Hellard

== Results ==
Date	Result	Competition	Venue	Ref
5 May 1994	Wales A 10-14 England A	Friendly	Swansea
3 October 1998	Wales A 18-28 Scotland A	Friendly	Pandy Park, Crosskeys
10 September 1999	England A 40-8 Wales A	Friendly	Prince of Wales Stadium, Cheltenham
19 September 1999	Scotland A 20-20 Wales A	Friendly	Portobello RFC, Edinburgh
19 August 2000	Scotland A 10-20 Wales A	Friendly	Glasgow
9 September 2001	Wales A 18-38 England A	Friendly	Rumney RFC, Cardiff
16 September 2001	Scotland A 22-40 Wales A	Friendly	The Boulevard, Hull
15 June 2002	Scotland A 22-40 Wales A	Amateur Four Nations	Old Anniesland, Glasgow
21 July 2002	Wales A 52-20 Ireland A	Amateur Four Nations	Old Penarthians RFC, Cardiff
15 September 2002	England A 18-28 Wales A	Amateur Four Nations	Prince of Wales Stadium, Cheltenham
28 June 2003	Ireland A 32-28 Wales A	Amateur Four Nations	Castle Avenue, Clontarf, Dublin
27 July 2003	Wales A 48-22 Scotland A	Amateur Four Nations	Brewery Field, Bridgend
14 September 2003	Wales A 28-18 England A	Amateur Four Nations	Talbot Athletic Ground, Aberavon
15 May 2004	Wales A 56-12 Ireland A	Amateur Four Nations	Cardiff Athletics Stadium, Cardiff
3 July 2004	Scotland A 26-34 Wales A	Amateur Four Nations	Hamilton RFC, Hamilton
12 September 2004	England A 32-34 Wales A	Amateur Four Nations	Butts Park Arena, Coventry
12 June 2005	Wales A 70-8 Scotland A	Amateur Four Nations	Brewery Field, Bridgend
16 July 2005	Ireland A 10-18 Wales A	Amateur Four Nations	Terenure College RFC, Dublin
27 August 2005	Wales A 52-12 Lebanon A	Friendly	Brewery Field, Bridgend
11 September 2005	Wales A 32-36 England A	Amateur Four Nations	Brewery Field, Bridgend
16 July 2006	Scotland A 16-22 Wales A	Amateur Four Nations	Lochinch RFC, Glasgow
19 August 2006	Wales A 10-24 Ireland A	Amateur Four Nations	Brewery Field, Bridgend
10 September 2006	England A 30-26 Wales A	Amateur Four Nations	Post Office Road, Featherstone
16 June 2007	Wales A 44-30 Scotland A	Amateur Four Nations	Cardiff Demons, St Peters rugby ground, Cardiff
30 June 2007	Wales A 22-18 France A	Friendly	Neath Port Talbot Steelers, Port Talbot
14 July 2007	Ireland A 16-16 Wales A	Amateur Four Nations	Carlow Crusaders, Cill Dara RFC, Kildare
19 August 2007	Wales A 39-18 England A	Amateur Four Nations	Blackwood Bulldogs, Glan-yr-Afon Park, Blackwood
21 June 2008	Scotland A 20-62 Wales A	Amateur Four Nations	Cartha Queens Park RFC, Glasgow
6 July 2008	Wales A 32-24 Ireland A	Amateur Four Nations	South Road Ground, Porthcawl RFC, Porthcawl
20 July 2008	England A 8-24 Wales A	Amateur Four Nations	Haworth Park, Hull
13 June 2009	Wales A 42-4 England A	Amateur Four Nations	Brewery Field, Bridgend
11 July 2009	Wales A 32-12 Scotland A	Amateur Four Nations	Blackwood Bulldogs, Glan-yr Afon Park, Blackwood
8 August 2009	Ireland A 28-26 Wales A	Amateur Four Nations	North Dublin Eagles, ALSAA Sports Complex, Dublin
13 June 2010	Wales A 34-8 Ireland A	Amateur Four Nations	The Gnoll, Neath
10 July 2010	England A 34-30 Wales A	Amateur Four Nations	Somerset Vikings, Morganians RFC, Bridgwater
14 August 2010	Scotland A 35-22 Wales A	Amateur Four Nations	Edinburgh
2 July 2011	Ireland A 22-54 Wales A	Amateur Four Nations	Limerick
16 July 2011	Wales A 34-22 Scotland A	Amateur Four Nations	Virginia Park, Caerphilly
6 August 2011	Wales A 30-24 England A	Amateur Four Nations	Virginia Park, Caerphilly
23 June 2012	England A 56-8 Wales A	Amateur Four Nations	Leigh Sports Village, Leigh, Greater Manchester
21 July 2012	Wales A 28-26 Ireland A	Amateur Four Nations	Bonymaen RFC, Bonymaen
13 August 2012	Scotland A 36-16 Wales A	Amateur Four Nations	Scotstoun Stadium, Glasgow
14 July 2013	Wales A 0-54 England A	Amateur Four Nations	The Gnoll, Neath
3 August 2013	Ireland A 14-48 Wales A	Amateur Four Nations	Limerick
24 August 2013	Wales A 64-18 Scotland A	Amateur Four Nations	Eirias Stadium, Colwyn Bay
10 August 2014	Scotland A 18-16 Wales A	Celtic Nations Cup	Woodside Sports Complex, Aberdeen
23 August 2014	Wales A 22-28 Ireland A	Celtic Nations Cup	Eirias Stadium, Colwyn Bay
28 November 2015	England A 56-10 Wales A	Friendly	Hindley RLFC, Wigan
10 November 2019	Wales A 58-0 Lithuania	Friendly	Cardiff Arms Park, Cardiff
23 November 2019	Wales A 34-18 Malta	Friendly	Brewery Field, Bridgend, Wales

== See also ==
- Wales national rugby league team
- Wales national rugby league team match results
- List of Wales national rugby league team players
- Amateur Four Nations
