= 2017 NRLB Championship =

Dutch rugby league season

- League: NRLB
- Duration: 6 Rounds (Followed by Finals)
- Teams: 4

2017 season
- Grand Final Winners: Rotterdam Pitbulls
- League Leader's: Den Haag Knights
- Runners-up: Den Haag Knights
- Biggest home win: Den Haag Knights 56-10 Amsterdam Cobras (Round 6)
- Biggest away win: Amsterdam Cobras 4-102 Den Haag Knights (Round 1)

The 2017 NRLB Championship, is the second semi-professional season of Dutch Rugby League Competition. Four teams compete over 6 rounds, after which the two highest enter the Grand Final. The two lowest teams then enter the third-place play-off.

2017 NRLB Championship features four teams, the first year in which this number has taken part, after the foundation of Harderwijk Dolphins in the summer of 2016. This is also the second year since the Netherlands hosted its own domestic competition, following the separation from Belgium.

== 2017 Competition ==
=== Rotterdam Nines ===
The annual NRLB nines competition returns in 2017, and will be hosted by the Rotterdamse Studenten Rugby Club, in Rotterdam.

=== Teams ===
Locations of 2017 NRLB Championship Clubs

Team	2016	Stadium	City/Area
Amsterdam Cobras	3rd	Sportpark de Eendracht, Bok de Korverweg 4, 1067 HR	Amsterdam, North Holland, Netherlands
Den Haag Knights	2nd	Haagsche RC, Theo Mann-Bouwmeesterlaan 800, 2597 HM	The Hague, South Holland, Netherlands
Harderwijk Dolphins	N/A	Christelijk College Nassau-Veluwe, Stationslaan 26, 3842 LA	Harderwijk, Gelderland, Netherlands
Rotterdam Pitbulls	1st	Rotterdamse Studenten RC, Prinsenlaan 906, 3062 CT	Rotterdam, South Holland, Netherlands

=== Ladder ===
	Team	Played	Won	Drawn	Lost	Bonus	PF	PA	PD	Points
1	Den Haag Knights	6	5	0	1	6	312	100	212	16
2	Rotterdam Pitbulls	6	5	0	1	6	210	154	56	16
3	Amsterdam Cobras	6	2	0	4	4	94	238	-144	8
4	Harderwijk Dolphins	6	0	0	6	4	112	236	-124	4

=== League Schedule ===
==== Round 1 ====
22 April 2017
14:00 CEST

Rotterdam Pitbulls	54-24	Harderwijk Dolphins
	Report

Rotterdamse Studenten Rugby Club, Rotterdam
Attendance: 50
Referee: Joe Jhugroo
28 April 2017
20:00 CEST

Amsterdam Cobras	4-102	Den Haag Knights
	Report

Sportpark de Eendracht, Amsterdam
Attendance: 15
Referee: Bas Sibejn

==== Round 2 ====
6 May 2017
13:00 CEST

Den Haag Knights	20-32	Rotterdam Pitbulls
	Report

Segbroek College, The Hague
Attendance: 50
Referee: Joe Jhugroo
6 May 2017
15:00 CEST

Amsterdam Cobras	34-16	Harderwijk Dolphins

Segbroek College, The Hague
Attendance: 53
Referee: Tom van Gorkum

==== Round 3 ====
13 May 2017
13:00 CEST

Harderwijk Dolphins	14-44	Den Haag Knights

Eeemland RC, Amersfoort
Attendance: TBC
Referee: Tom van Gorkum
13 May 2017
15:00 CEST

Rotterdam Pitbulls	40-22	Amsterdam Cobras

Eeemland RC, Amersfoort
Attendance: TBC
Referee: Joe Jhugroo

==== Round 4 ====
20 May 2017
13:00 CEST

Amsterdam Cobras	W-L	Harderwijk Dolphins

Sportpark de Eendracht, Amsterdam
20 May 2017
15:00 CEST

Den Haag Knights	52-18	Rotterdam Pitbulls

Sportpark de Eendracht, Amsterdam
Attendance: TBC
Referee: Tom O'Grady

==== Round 5 ====
26 May 2017
20:00 CEST

Rotterdam Pitbulls	W-L	Amsterdam Cobras

Rotterdamse Rugby Club, Rotterdam
27 May 2017
16:00 CEST

Harderwijk Dolphins	22-38	Den Haag Knights

Christelijk College Nassau-Veluwe, Harderwijk
Attendance: TBC
Referee: Moray Gilliand

==== Round 6 ====
3 June 2017
13:00 CEST

Den Haag Knights	56-10	Amsterdam Cobras

Haagsche Rugby Club, The Hague
Attendance: TBC
Referee: Bas Sibejn
3 June 2017
15:00 CEST

Harderwijk Dolphins	30-48	Rotterdam Pitbulls

Haagsche Rugby Club, The Hague
Attendance: TBC
Referee: (England) Matt Rigby

=== Finals ===
==== Third-Place Play Off ====
10 June 2017
13:00 CEST

Amsterdam Cobras	16-20 (AET)	Harderwijk Dolphins

Rotterdamse Rugby Club, Rotterdam
Attendance: TBC
Referee: Moray Gilliand

==== Grand Final ====
10 June 2017
15:15 CEST

Den Haag Knights	24-26	Rotterdam Pitbulls

Rotterdamse Rugby Club, Rotterdam
Attendance: TBC
Referee: Joseph Jhugroo

=== Great British Royal Air Force Tour ===
==== Game 1 ====
17 June 2017
15:00 CEST

Amsterdam/Rotterdam Select	18-88	Royal Air Force RL

TBC
Attendance: TBC
Referee: (Fiji) Misa Vakadranu

==== Game 2 ====
21 June 2017
20:00 CEST

Den Haag/Harderwijk Select	0-62	Royal Air Force RL

Haagsche RC, The Hague
Referee: (Australia) Joe Jhugroo

==== Game 3 ====
25 June 2017
15:00 CEST

NRLB Select	0-90	Royal Air Force RL

Christelijk College Nassau-Veluwe, Harderwijk
Referee: (England) Unknown
