= Ireland A national rugby league team =

The Ireland A national rugby league team nicknamed the Wolfhounds was a side made up of amateur players from the Irish domestic competition. The team competed against England A, Wales A and Scotland A in the Amateur Four Nations and against the USA in a St Patrick's Day match. The team is administered by Rugby League Ireland. There are now two distinct sides fielded at this level - Ireland Wolfhounds selecting domestic based players only whilst Ireland A draws on both heritage and domestic based players. Wayne Kerr is the current coach of Ireland A, while Sean Cody and John Tyerman coach Ireland Wolfhounds.

== Overall Record ==
Against	Played	Won	Drawn	Lost	Win %	For	Aga	Diff
Total	48	19	1	28	39.58%	–	–	–

== Results ==
No.	Date	Result	Competition	Venue
1	25 October 1997	Ireland A 25–18 Scotland A	Friendly	Blackrock College, Dublin
2	30 May 1998	Scotland A 16–21 Ireland A	Friendly	Bellsland Park, Kilmarnock
3	18 March 2000	United States 19–6 Ireland A	St Patrick's Day Challenge	
4	9 September 2001	Scotland A 12–28 Ireland A	Friendly	Glasgow
5	16 March 2002	United States 24–22 Ireland A	St Patrick's Day Challenge	
6	16 June 2002	Ireland A 10–32 England A	Amateur Four Nations	Dublin
7	21 July 2002	Wales A 52–20 Ireland A	Amateur Four Nations	Old Penarthians RFC, Cardiff
8	18 August 2002	Ireland A 70–10 Scotland A	Amateur Four Nations	Belfast
9	15 March 2003	United States 20–16 Ireland A	St Patrick's Day Challenge	
10	28 June 2003	Ireland A 32–28 Wales A	Amateur Four Nations	Castle Avenue, Clontarf, Dublin
11	27 July 2003	England A 34–14 Ireland A	Amateur Four Nations	Prince of Wales Stadium, Cheltenham
12	9 August 2003	Scotland A 48–20 Ireland A	Amateur Four Nations	Queen's Park, Glasgow
13	24 March 2004	United States 41–10 Ireland A	St Patrick's Day Challenge	
14	15 May 2004	Wales A 56–12 Ireland A	Amateur Four Nations	Cardiff Athletics Stadium, Cardiff
15	3 July 2004	Ireland A 28–24 England A	Amateur Four Nations	Castle Avenue, Clontarf, Dublin
16	22 August 2004	Ireland A 16–24 Scotland A	Amateur Four Nations	Navan R.F.C., County Meath
17	2 July 2005	England A 8–26 Ireland A	Amateur Four Nations	The Shay, Halifax
18	16 July 2005	Ireland A 10–18 Wales A	Amateur Four Nations	Terenure College RFC, Dublin
19	14 August 2005	Scotland A 44–16 Ireland A	Amateur Four Nations	Glasgow
20	3 June 2006	Ireland A 38–30 Scotland A	Amateur Four Nations	St Mary's College RFC, Dublin
21	15 July 2006	Ireland A 23–44 England A	Amateur Four Nations	Terenure College RFC, Dublin
22	19 August 2006	Wales A 10–24 Ireland A	Amateur Four Nations	Brewery Field, Bridgend
23	23 June 2007	England A 22–28 Ireland A	Amateur Four Nations	Leigh Sports Village, Leigh
24	14 July 2007	Ireland A 16–16 Wales A	Amateur Four Nations	Carlow Crusaders, Cill Dara RFC, Kildare
25	11 August 2007	Scotland A 18–28 Ireland A	Amateur Four Nations	Old Anniesland, Glasgow
26	7 June 2008	France A 14–40 Ireland A	Friendly	
27	6 July 2008	Wales A 32–24 Ireland A	Amateur Four Nations	South Road Ground, Porthcawl RFC, Porthcawl
28	26 July 2008	Ireland A 26–28 Scotland A	Amateur Four Nations	Dublin
29	6 September 2008	Ireland A 36–24 England A	Amateur Four Nations	Tullamore
30	13 June 2009	Scotland A 22–30 Ireland A	Amateur Four Nations	Edinburgh
31	11 July 2009	England A 28–12 Ireland A	Amateur Four Nations	Broughton Park RUFC, Manchester
32	8 August 2009	Ireland A 28–26 Wales A	Amateur Four Nations	North Dublin Eagles, ALSAA Sports Complex, Dublin
33	13 June 2010	Wales A 34–8 Ireland A	Amateur Four Nations	The Gnoll, Neath
34	10 July 2010	Ireland A 6–10 Scotland A	Amateur Four Nations	Terenure College RFC, Dublin
35	14 August 2010	Ireland A 12–44 England A	Amateur Four Nations	Limerick
36	22 March 2011	United States 8–26 Ireland A	Saint Patrick's Day Test	Garthwaite Stadium, Philadelphia
37	2 July 2011	Ireland A 22–54 Wales A	Amateur Four Nations	Limerick
38	16 July 2011	England A 12–26 Ireland A	Amateur Four Nations	Pennine Way stadium, Hemel Hempstead
39	13 August 2011	Scotland A 26–8 Ireland A	Amateur Four Nations	Scotstoun Stadium, Glasgow
40	18 March 2012	United States 38–20 Ireland A	Saint Patrick's Day Test	Widener University, Philadelphia
41	21 July 2012	Wales A 28–26 Ireland A	Amateur Four Nations	Bonymaen RFC, Bonymaen
42	6 August 2012	Ireland A 0–38 England A	Amateur Four Nations	Kilballyowen Park, Bruff R.F.C., Limerick
43	3 August 2013	Ireland A 14–48 Wales A	Amateur Four Nations	Limerick
44	10 August 2013	Scotland A 38–26 Ireland A	Amateur Four Nations	Falkirk RFC
45	23 August 2013	England A 52–0 Ireland A	Amateur Four Nations	Pennine Way stadium, Hemel Hempstead
46	16 August 2014	Ireland A 44–10 Scotland A	Celtic Nations Cup	Ashbourne RFC
47	23 August 2014	Wales A 22–28 Ireland A	Celtic Nations Cup	Eirias Stadium, Colwyn Bay
48	15 October 2016	Ireland A 10–68 Jamaica	Friendly	Carlisle Grounds, Bray
49	22 October 2016	Hungary 0–70 Ireland A	Friendly	NKE Sportpalya, Hungary
50	07 October 2023	Ireland A 16–28 Wales Dragonhearts	Friendly	Morton Stadium, Dublin
51	21 October 2023	Ireland A 18–64 England Community Lions	Friendly	Morton Stadium, Dublin
52	20 September 2024	Ireland A 30–28 Netherlands	Friendly	Zaandijk RC, The Netherlands
53	20 September 2025	Ireland A 26–18 Wales Dragonhearts	Friendly	The Gnoll, Wales
54	4 October 2025	Ireland A 30–0 Netherlands	Friendly	RC The Bassets, Netherlands
55	1 November 2025	Ireland A 26–22 Wales Dragonhearts	Friendly	Castleford Panthers ARLFC, England
56	22 August 2026	Ireland Wolfhounds 38–30 Scotland Bravehearts	Friendly	Raeburn Place, Scotland
57	5 September 2026	Ireland Wolfhounds 30–16 Scotland Bravehearts	Friendly	Garda RFC, Ireland

== See also ==
- Ireland national rugby league team match results
- List of Ireland national rugby league team players
- Amateur Four Nations
