= Scotland national rugby league team match results =

The following list is a complete collection of results for the Scotland national rugby league team.

== 1990s ==
Date	Home	Score	Away	Competition	Venue	Attendance
13 August 1995	Ireland	26–22	Scotland	Friendly	(Republic of Ireland) RDS Arena, Dublin	5,716
16 October 1995	Scotland	34–9	Russia	1995 Emerging Nations Tournament	(England) Post Office Road, Featherstone	3,133
18 October 1995	Scotland	38–16	United States	1995 Emerging Nations Tournament	(England) Sixfields Stadium, Northampton	2,088
20 October 1995	Scotland	10–21	Cook Islands	1995 Emerging Nations Tournament	(England) Wheldon Road, Castleford	2,889
6 August 1996	Scotland	26–6	Ireland	Friendly	(Scotland) Firhill Park, Glasgow	1,147
9 July 1997	Scotland	20–22	France	Friendly	(Scotland) Firhill Park, Glasgow	2,233
11 November 1998	France	26–22	Scotland	Clash Of The Nations	(France) Stade Jean Laffon, Perpignan	3,700
18 November 1998	Scotland	10–17	Ireland	Clash Of The Nations	(Scotland) Firhill Park, Glasgow	1,028
22 October 1999	Scotland	36–16	Wales	1999 Triangular Series	(Scotland) Firhill Park, Glasgow	677
31 October 1999	Ireland	31–10	Scotland	1999 Triangular Series	(Republic of Ireland) Tolka Park, Dublin	385

== 2000s ==
Date	Home	Score	Away	Competition	Venue	Attendance
29 October 2000	Scotland	16–17	Māori	2000 World Cup	(Scotland) Firhill ParkGlasgow	2,008
1 November 2000	Ireland	18–6	Scotland	2000 World Cup	(Republic of Ireland) Tolka Park, Dublin	1,782
5 November 2000	Scotland	12–20	Samoa	2000 World Cup	(Scotland) Tynecastle Stadium, Edinburgh	1,579
3 July 2001	France	20–42	Scotland	Friendly	(France) Stade du Moulin, Lézignan–Corbières	3,161
26 October 2003	Scotland	22–24	Ireland	2003 European Nations Cup	(Scotland) Old Anniesland, Glasgow	1,123
9 November 2003	France	6–8	Scotland	2003 European Nations Cup	(France) Parc des Sports, Avignon	2,200
24 October 2004	Scotland	30–22	Wales	2004 European Nations Cup	(Scotland) Old Anniesland, Glasgow	1,047
29 October 2004	Ireland	43–10	Scotland	2004 European Nations Cup	(Republic of Ireland) Navan R.F.C., County Meath	600
16 October 2005	Wales	22–14	Scotland	2005 European Nations Cup	(Wales) Brewery Field, Bridgend	1,176
23 October 2005	Scotland	6–12	Ireland	2005 European Nations Cup	(Scotland) Old Anniesland, Glasgow	1,276
29 October 2006	Wales	14–21	Scotland	2008 World Cup Qualifying	(Wales) Brewery Field, Bridgend	2,378
27 October 2007	France	46–16	Scotland	Friendly	(France) Stade Gilbert Brutus, Perpignan	7,000
4 November 2007	Scotland	16–18	Wales	2008 World Cup Qualifying	(Scotland) Old Anniesland, Glasgow	911
26 October 2008	France	36–18	Scotland	2008 World Cup	(Australia) Canberra Stadium, Canberra	9,287
5 November 2008	Fiji	16–18	Scotland	2008 World Cup	(Australia) Central Coast Stadium, Gosford	9,720
8 November 2008	Scotland	0–48	Tonga	2008 World Cup	(Australia) Browne Park, Rockhampton	5,930
17 October 2009	Italy	0–104	Scotland	2009 European Cup	(Italy) Stadio Plebiscito, Padova	2,139
1 November 2009	Scotland	22–10	Lebanon	2009 European Cup	(Scotland) Hughenden Stadium, Glasgow	752
8 November 2009	Wales	28–16	Scotland	2009 European Cup	(Wales) Brewery Field, Bridgend	1,608

== 2010s ==
Date	Home	Score	Away	Competition	Venue	Attendance
10 October 2010	Scotland	22–60	Wales	2010 European Cup	(Scotland) Old Anniesland, Glasgow	787
16 October 2010	France	26–12	Scotland	2010 European Cup	(France) Stade Municipal d'Albi, Albi	7,150
24 October 2010	Ireland	22–42	Scotland	2010 European Cup	(Republic of Ireland) Tallaght Stadium, Dublin	684
16 October 2011	Scotland	26–6	Ireland	2011 Autumn International Series	(Scotland) Scotstoun Stadium, Glasgow	802
29 October 2011	France	46–10	Scotland	2011 Autumn International Series	(France) Stade Gilbert Brutus, Perpignan	10,313
14 October 2012	Scotland	18–30	Ireland	2012 European Cup	(Scotland) Meggetland Stadium, Edinburgh	726
28 October 2012	Scotland	24–62	England Knights	2012 European Cup	(Scotland) Meggetland Stadium, Edinburgh	
19 October 2013	Scotland	20–38	Papua New Guinea	Friendly	(England) Post Office Road, Featherstone	1,412
29 October 2013	Scotland	26–24	Tonga	2013 World Cup	(England) Derwent Park, Workington	7,630
3 November 2013	Scotland	30–30	Italy	2013 World Cup	(England) Derwent Park, Workington	7,280
7 November 2013	Scotland	22–8	United States	2013 World Cup	(England) Salford City Stadium, Salford	6,041
15 November 2013	New Zealand	40–4	Scotland	2013 World Cup	(England) Headingley Stadium, Leeds	16,207
17 October 2014	Scotland	42–18	Wales	2014 European Cup	(England) Derwent Park, Workington	2,036
25 October 2014	Ireland	4–25	Scotland	2014 European Cup	(Republic of Ireland) Tallaght Stadium, Dublin	?
31 October 2014	Scotland	22–38	France	2014 European Cup	(Scotland) Netherdale, Galashiels	1,432
16 October 2015	Wales	18–12	Scotland	2015 European Cup	(Wales) Racecourse Ground, Wrexham	1,253
23 October 2015	Scotland	22–24	Ireland	2015 European Cup	(Scotland) Netherdale, Galashiels	1,197
7 November 2015	France	32–18	Scotland	2015 European Cup	(France) Parc des Sports, Avignon	5,737
21 October 2016	Cumbria	16–48	Scotland	Friendly	(England) Craven Park, Barrow–in–Furness	1,048
28 October 2016	Australia	54–12	Scotland	2016 Four Nations	(England) Craven Park, Kingston upon Hull	5,337
5 November 2016	England	38–12	Scotland	2016 Four Nations	(England) Ricoh Arena, Coventry	21,009
11 November 2016	New Zealand	18–18	Scotland	2016 Four Nations	(England) Derwent Park, Workington	6,628
29 October 2017	Scotland	4–50	Tonga	2017 World Cup	(Australia) Barlow Park, Cairns	9,216
4 November 2017	New Zealand	74–6	Scotland	2017 World Cup	(New Zealand) Christchurch Stadium, Christchurch	12,130
11 November 2017	Samoa	14–14	Scotland	2017 World Cup	(Australia) Barlow Park, Cairns	4,309
27 October 2018	Ireland	36–10	Scotland	2018 European Championship	(Republic of Ireland) Morton Stadium, Santry	≈200
2 November 2018	Scotland	12–50	Wales	2018 European Championship	(Scotland) Netherdale, Galashiels	≈250
10 November 2018	France	28–10	Scotland	2018 European Championship	(France) Stade Albert Domec, Carcassonne	2,854
26 October 2019	Scotland	86–0	Serbia	2021 World Cup European Qualifying	(Scotland) Lochinch Sports Pavilion, Glasgow	274
1 November 2019	Greece	24–42	Scotland	2021 World Cup European Qualifying	(England) New River Stadium, London	

== 2020s ==
Date	Home	Score	Away	Competition	Venue	Attendance
24 October 2021	Jamaica	30–30	Scotland	Friendly	(England) Post Office Road, Featherstone	
9 October 2023	Scotland	4–28	England Knights	Friendly	(Scotland) Edinburgh	
16 October 2022	Scotland	4–28	Italy	2021 World Cup	(England) Kingston Park, Newcastle	6,206
21 October 2022	Australia	84–0	Scotland	2021 World Cup	(England) Ricoh Arena, Coventry	10,276
29 October 2022	Fiji	30–14	Scotland	2021 World Cup	(England) Kingston Park, Newcastle	6,736
14 September 2024	Netherlands	34–26	Scotland	Friendly	(Netherlands) RC The Bassets, Sassenheim	
27 October 2024	Scotland	6–36	Ireland	Friendly	(England) Gateshead International Stadium, Gateshead	
10 January 2026	Barrow Raiders	74–6	Scotland	Friendly	(England) Craven Park, Barrow-in-Furness	
27 February 2026	United States	28–20	Scotland	Friendly	(United States) Coronado High School, Las Vegas	
5 July 2026	Scotland	22–10	Canada	Friendly	(Scotland) Hawick RFC, Hawick	
17 October 2026	Scotland	12–46	Ireland	Celtic Cup	(Scotland) Hawick RFC, Hawick	
24 October 2026	Scotland	0–38	Wales	Celtic Cup	(Scotland) Biggar RFC, Biggar	

== See also ==
- Scotland A national rugby league team
- List of Scotland national rugby league team players
