= Rugby League Amateur Four Nations =

The Amateur Four Nations was a rugby league competition contested annually by England Amateurs, Ireland Amateurs, Scotland Amateurs, and Wales Amateurs. The teams from the Celtic nations would pick players from their domestic competitions, while England's squad would be picked from teams in the Rugby League Conference. Players would also come from university teams and the armed forces. The competition, sometimes referred to as the Four Nations Championship, had previously been sponsored by Cheltenham Regency and Parkhouse Recruitment and Skanska. In 2014 the tournament was renamed the Celtic Nations Cup following England's withdrawal

== History ==
Friendly matches between A sides were played between 1998 and 2001 with Scotland facing Wales twice and Ireland three times and Wales taking on England once.

The success of these one-off friendly internationals saw the advent of the first Home Nations Championship in 2002.

Until the final match between Wales and England at Cheltenham, the tournament was low-key and had little publicity. But the England v Wales match received unprecedented national coverage with highlights on Sky Sports and resulted in a shock Wales win.

Wales would continue to "shock" for the next four years as they continued to win the title, only losing two matches in this period. It took the introduction of the Crusaders to weaken the Wales side and allow England to win the title for the first time in 2006. Even then Wales only lost by two penalties and travelled with a weakened injury-laden side.

The tournament has been successful in introducing new players to international rugby league in particular with the Celtic nations where some players have progressed to the senior side and also into semi-professional rugby league teams.

== Overall Record ==
Nation	Nickname	Pld	W	D	L	Titles
Wales	Dragonhearts	38	25	1	12	8
England	Lionhearts	36	19	0	17	3
Scotland	Bravehearts	37	15	0	22	1
Ireland	Wolfhounds	37	14	1	22	1

== Results and Tables ==
=== 2002 ===
Team	P	W	D	L	For	Agn	Pts	Diff
Wales	3	3	0	0	120	60	6	60
England	3	2	0	1	108	46	4	62
Ireland	3	1	0	2	100	94	2	6
Scotland	3	0	0	3	40	168	0	-128

15 June - Scotland A 22 Wales A 40 at Old Anniesland, Glasgow

16 June - Ireland A 10 England A 32 at Dublin

20 July - Scotland A 8 England A 58 at Glasgow

21 July - Wales A 52 Ireland A 20 at Old Penarthians RFC, Cardiff

18 August - Ireland A 70 Scotland A 10 at Belfast

15 September - England A 18 Wales A 28 at Prince of Wales Stadium, Cheltenham

=== 2003 ===
Team	P	W	D	L	For	Agn	Pts	Diff
Wales	3	2	0	1	104	72	4	32
England	3	2	0	1	80	62	4	18
Scotland	3	1	0	2	90	96	2	-6
Ireland	3	1	0	2	66	110	2	-44

21 June - England A 28 Scotland A 20 at Elmpark Way, York

28 June - Ireland A 32 Wales A 28 at Castle Avenue, Clontarf, Dublin

27 July - Wales A 48 Scotland A 22 at Brewery Field, Bridgend

27 July - England A 34 Ireland A 14 at Prince of Wales Stadium, Cheltenham

9 August - Scotland A 48 Ireland A 20 at Cartha Queens Park RFC, Glasgow

14 September - Wales A 28 England A 18 at Talbot Athletic Ground, Aberavon

=== 2004 ===
Team	P	W	D	L	For	Agn	Pts	Diff
Wales	3	3	0	0	124	70	6	54
Scotland	3	1	0	2	76	78	2	-2
England	3	1	0	2	63	88	2	-25
Ireland	3	1	0	2	56	83	2	-27

15 May - Wales A 56 Ireland A 12 at Cardiff Athletics Stadium

13 June - Scotland A 26 England A 28 at Hamilton RFC

3 July - Scotland A 26 Wales A 34 at Glasgow

3 July - Ireland A 28 England A 24 at Castle Avenue, Clontarf, Dublin

22 August - Ireland A 16 Scotland A 24 at Navan R.F.C.

12 September - England A 32 Wales A 34 at Butts Park Arena, Coventry

=== 2005 ===
Team	P	W	D	L	For	Agn	Pts	Diff
Wales	3	2	0	1	120	54	4	66
Scotland	3	2	0	1	69	102	4	-33
England	3	1	0	2	60	75	2	-15
Ireland	3	1	0	2	52	70	2	-18

12 June - Wales A 70 Scotland A 8 at Brewery Field, Bridgend

2 July - England A 8 Ireland A 26 at Odsal, Bradford

16 July - Ireland A 10 Wales A 18 at Terenure College RFC, Dublin

23 July - England A 16 Scotland A 17 at New River Stadium, London Skolars

14 August - Scotland A 44 Ireland A 16 at Glasgow

11 September - Wales A 32 England A 36 at Brewery Field, Bridgend

=== 2006 ===
Team	P	W	D	L	For	Agn	Pts	Diff
England	3	3	0	0	120	63	6	57
Ireland	3	2	0	1	85	84	4	1
Wales	3	1	0	2	58	70	2	-12
Scotland	3	0	0	3	60	106	0	-46

Saturday 15 July - Ireland A 23 England A 44 at Terenure College RFC, Dublin

Saturday 3 June - Ireland A 38 Scotland A 30 at St Marys RFC, Limerick

Sunday 16 July - Scotland A 16 Wales A 22 at Lochinch RFC, Glasgow

Sunday 13 August - Scotland A 14 England A 46 at Glasgow

Saturday 19 August - Wales A 10 Ireland A 24 at Brewery Field, Bridgend

Sunday 10 September England A 30 Wales A 26 at Post Office Road, Featherstone

=== 2007 ===
Team	P	W	D	L	For	Agn	Pts	Diff
Wales	3	2	1	0	99	64	5	35
Ireland	3	2	1	0	72	56	5	16
England	3	1	0	2	81	107	2	-26
Scotland	3	0	0	3	88	114	0	-26

Saturday 16 June - Wales A 44 Scotland A 30 at Cardiff Demons, St Peters rugby ground

Saturday 23 June - England A 22 Ireland A 28 at Leigh Sports Village

Saturday 14 July - Ireland A 16 Wales 16 at Carlow Crusaders Cill Dara RFC, Kildare

Saturday 14 July - England A 42 Scotland A 40 at Gateshead International Stadium

Saturday 11 August - Scotland A 18 Ireland A 28 at Old Anniesland, Glasgow

Sunday 19 August - Wales A 39 England A 18 at Blackwood Bulldogs, Glan-yr-Afon Park, Blackwood

=== 2008 ===
Pos	Nation	Pld	W	D	L	F	A	Pts	Diff
1	Wales	3	3	0	0	118	52	6	+66
2	Scotland	3	2	0	1	74	112	4	-38
3	Ireland	3	1	0	2	86	84	2	+2
4	England	3	0	0	3	56	86	0	-30

Saturday 21 June - Scotland A 20 Wales A 62 at Cartha Queens Park RFC, Glasgow

Sunday 6 July - Wales A 32 Ireland A 24 at South Road Ground, Porthcawl RFC

Sunday 20 July - England A 8 Wales A 24 at Haworth Park, Hull

Saturday 26 July - Ireland A 26 Scotland A 28 at Dublin

Saturday 16 August - Scotland A 26 England A 24 at Edinburgh

Saturday 6 September - Ireland A 36 England A 24 at Tullamore

=== 2009 ===
Pos	Nation	Pld	W	D	L	F	A	Pts	Diff
1	Wales	3	2	O	1	100	42	4	+58
2	Ireland	3	2	0	1	70	76	4	-6
3	Scotland	3	1	0	2	74	86	2	-12
4	England	3	1	0	2	56	94	2	-38

Saturday 13 June - Wales A 42 England A 4 at Brewery Field, Bridgend

Saturday 13 June - Scotland A 22 Ireland A 30 at Edinburgh

Saturday 11 July - Wales A 32 Scotland A 12 at Glan-yr-Afon Park, Blackwood

Saturday 11 July - England A 28 Ireland A 12 at Broughton Park RUFC, Manchester

Saturday 8 August - Ireland A 28 Wales A 26 at ALSAA Sports Complex, Dublin

Saturday 8 August - England A 24 Scotland A 40 at Staines RFC, London

=== 2010 ===
Pos	Nation	Pld	W	D	L	F	A	Pts	Diff
1	Scotland	3	3	0	0	79	60	6	+19
2	England	3	2	0	1	110	76	4	+34
3	Wales	3	1	0	2	86	77	2	+9
4	Ireland	3	0	0	3	26	88	0	-62

Sunday 13 June - Wales A 34 Ireland A 8 at The Gnoll, Neath

Sunday 13 June - Scotland A 34 England A 32 at GHA RFC, Glasgow

Saturday 10 July - England A 34 Wales A 30 at Somerset Vikings, Morganians RFC, Bridgwater

Saturday 10 July - Ireland A 6 Scotland A 10 at Terenure College RFC, Dublin

Saturday 14 August - Ireland A 12 England A 44 at Limerick

Saturday 14 August - Scotland A 35 Wales A 22 at Edinburgh

=== 2011 ===
Pos	Nation	Pld	W	D	L	F	A	Pts	Diff
1	Wales	3	3	0	0	118	68	6	+50
2	Scotland	3	1	0	2	70	72	2	-2
3	England	3	1	0	2	66	78	2	-12
4	Ireland	3	1	0	2	56	92	2	-36

Saturday 25 June - England A 30 Scotland A 22 at Stanningley Rugby League club, Leeds

Saturday 2 July - Ireland A 22 Wales A 54 at Limerick

Saturday 16 July - Wales A 34 Scotland A 22 at Virginia Park, Caerphilly

Saturday 16 July - England A 12 Ireland A 26 at Pennine Way stadium, Hemel Hempstead

Saturday 6 August - Wales A 30 England A 24 at Virginia Park, Caerphilly

Saturday 13 August - Scotland A 26 Ireland A 8 at Scotstoun Stadium, Glasgow

=== 2012 ===
Pos	Nation	Pld	W	D	L	F	A	Pts	Diff
1	England	3	2	0	1	108	56	4	+52
2	Scotland	2	2	0	0	84	30	4	+54
3	Wales	3	1	0	2	52	118	2	-66
4	Ireland	2	0	0	2	26	66	0	-40

Saturday 23 June - Ireland A v Scotland A postponed

Saturday 23 June - England A 56 Wales A 8 at Leigh Sports Village

Saturday 21 July - Scotland A 48 England A 14 at Falkirk RFC

Saturday 21 July - Wales A 28 Ireland A 26 at Bonymaen RFC

Saturday 6 August - Ireland A 0 England A 38 at Bruff R.F.C., Limerick

Saturday 13 August - Scotland A 36 Wales A 16 at Scotstoun Stadium, Glasgow

=== 2013 ===
Pos	Nation	Pld	W	D	L	F	A	Pts	Diff
1	England	3	3	0	0	200	0	6	+200
2	Wales	3	2	0	1	112	86	4	+26
3	Scotland	3	1	0	2	56	184	2	-128
4	Ireland	3	0	0	3	40	138	0	-98

Sunday 14 July - Wales A 0 England A 54 at The Gnoll, Neath

Saturday 3 August - Ireland A 14 Wales A 48 at Limerick

Saturday 10 August - Scotland A 38 Ireland A 26 at Falkirk RFC

Friday 23 August - England A 52 Ireland A 0 at Pennine Way stadium, Hemel Hempstead

Saturday 24 August - Wales A 54 Scotland A 18 at Eirias Stadium, Colwyn Bay

Saturday 15 September - England A 94 Scotland A 0 at Wath Brow Hornets ARLFC

== Celtic Nations Cup ==
=== 2014 ===
Pos	Nation	Pld	W	D	L	F	A	Pts	Diff
1	Ireland	2	2	0	0	72	32	4	+40
2	Scotland	2	1	0	1	28	60	2	-32
3	Wales	2	0	0	2	38	46	0	-8

Sunday 10 August - Scotland A 18 Wales A 16 at Woodside Sports Complex, Aberdeen

Saturday 16 August - Ireland A 44 Scotland A 10 at Ashbourne RFC

Saturday 23 August - Wales A 22 Ireland A 28 at Eirias Stadium, Colwyn Bay

== See also ==
- England A national rugby league team
- Ireland A national rugby league team
- Scotland A national rugby league team
- Wales A national rugby league team
