= Lithuania national rugby league team =

Lithuania
Team information
- Governing body: Lietuva Rugby League
- Region: Europe
- Head coach: Chris Coates
- Captain: Mindaugas Kazlauskas

Team results
- First international
- Wales A 58-0 Lithuania (Cardiff, Wales; 10 November 2019)
- Biggest defeat
- Wales A 58-0 Lithuania (Cardiff, Wales; 10 November 2019)

The Lithuania national rugby league team represents Lithuania in international rugby league football competitions. They made their debut in rugby league nines at the 2019 London Nines, of which they finished runners up to the London Skolars in the men's social competition. Lithuania made their full 13-a-side debut an international friendly against Wales Dragonhearts 58–0.
