= Home Nations Championship =

Home Nations Championship may refer to any of following competitions competed for by representative teams from the Home Nations:

- Six Nations Championship, rugby union competition originally known as the Home Nations Championship
- British Home Championship, defunct football competition
- Skanska Amateur Four Nations, rugby league competition
