= Scotland rugby team =

Scotland rugby team can refer to the following -

- Scotland national rugby union team
  - Scotland national women's rugby union team
  - Scotland national rugby sevens team
  - Scotland A national rugby union team
- Scotland national rugby league team
  - Scotland A national rugby league team
- Scotland national wheelchair rugby league team
