= 1939–40 Scottish Districts season =

Rugby union competition

- Countries: Scotland
- Date: 1939-40
- Matches played: 1

The 1939–40 Scottish Districts season is a record of all the rugby union matches for Scotland's district teams.

== History ==
There was no Inter-City match this year due to the Second World War.

Permission was given for a South of Scotland District side to play a military XV in aid of the Red Cross. The match was scheduled for 4 November 1939.

East of Scotland District played a West of Scotland District side.

The Cities District versus Army XV match was organised in aid of the City of Glasgow Central War Relief Fund; and raised nearly £26,000.

== Results ==
Date	Try	Conversion	Penalty	Dropped goal	Goal from mark	Notes
1905–1947	3 points	2 points	3 points	4 points	3 points	

=== Inter-City ===
None.

=== Other Scottish matches ===
23 December 1939

East of Scotland District	7 - 6	West of Scotland District
Try: M. R. Dewar; Drop: E. C. Hunter	Report	Try: D. H. Neill; J. G. S. Forrest

Old Anniesland, Glasgow
Attendance: 3,000
Referee: F. J. C. Moffat

East of Scotland District:
West of Scotland District:

2 March 1940

Cities District	11 - 0	Army Rugby Union
Try: D. H. J. Neil; J. G. S. Forrest; M. R. Dewar; Con: J. G. S. Forrest	Report; Report

Old Anniesland, Glasgow

Cities District: J. W. Adair (Heriot ' s F. P. ); D. H. J. Neil (Glasgow High School F. P.), J. G. S. Forrest (Cambridge University), H. Wylie (Watsonians), and G. II. Caithness (Edinburgh City Police ); D. Yellowlees (Outcasts ) and M. R. Dewar (Watsonians ); H. Thomson (Glascow Academicals), P. W. Tait (Hoyal High School F. P ) 1 ). W. Deas (Heriot ' s F. P.), J, D. Burnett (Kilmarnock ) J. C. llornel (Ardeer), J. H. Orr (Edinburgh City Police ) It. Mackay (Glasgow High School V. V.), and 1 !. J. L. Hammond (Royal Navy. )
Army Rugby Union: Pte. " J. Butler; Pte. I. Shankland, 2 nd Lieut, H. G. Uren, Pte. H. Carruthersand 2 nd Lieut. A. M. Stevenson; Pte. A. L. Crozier and Lance-Corporal. 1. Hosarth; Pte.. r. Hobson, Gunner W. C. Henderson Pte. W. Brunton 2 nd Lieut. R. II. Park, Lance-Corporal K. Cowe 2 nd Lieut ,. 1. N. Cadzow. 2 nd Lieut. P. L. Dull, and Sergeant-Major L. Denham

=== English matches ===
No other District matches played.

=== International matches ===
No touring matches this season.
