= Joe Taylor (rugby league, born 1991) =

Ireland international rugby league footballer

Personal information
- Full name: Joe Taylor
- Born: 1 September 1991 (age 33); Leixlip, County Kildare, Ireland

Playing information
- Position: Wing
Club
Years	Team	Pld	T	G	FG	P
	Leeds Rhinos	0	0	0	0	0
	North Dublin Eagles	0	0	0	0	0
	Total	0	0	0	0	0
Representative
Years	Team	Pld	T	G	FG	P
2010–11	Ireland	5	3	0	0	12

Joe Taylor (born 1 September 1991) is an Irish rugby league footballer.

== Background ==
Joe Taylor was born in Leixlip, County Kildare, Ireland.

== Playing career ==
He currently plays for the Leeds Rhinos in the Super League and the North Dublin Eagles. He has previously played rugby union for Barnhall RFC in Leixlip, County Kildare. He is an Ireland international and has also captained the Ireland students rugby league team.
