= 2008 Rugby League World Cup qualifying =

2008 Rugby League World Cup qualification
Tournament details
- Dates: April 2006 – November 2007
- Teams: 14 (from 3 confederations)

Tournament statistics
- Matches played: 9

2008 Rugby League World Cup qualifying matches took place from April 2006 to November 2007. Of the ten teams to compete in the 2008 Rugby League World Cup, five of them qualified based on their performance in these matches. The other five teams had qualified automatically.

== Qualified teams ==
6 Asian-Pacific teams qualified for the World Cup; 3 qualified automatically, with the top 2 in the Pacific qualifying group also reaching the finals. Samoa finished third in the Pacific qualifying group and earned a qualification spot by winning the repechage. 4 European teams qualified for the World Cup. 2 qualified automatically, with a further 2 finals berths for the winner of each European qualifying group. No teams from the Atlantic qualifying group reached the finals, with the USA losing at the repechage semi-final stage.

Team	Method of qualification	Date of qualification	Finals appearance	Last appearance	Previous best performance
Australia	Host	N/A	Final	2000	Winners (1957, 1968, 1970, 1975, 1977, 1988, 1992, 1995, 2000)
New Zealand	Automatic qualifier	N/A	Champions	2000	Runners-up (1988, 2000)
Papua New Guinea	Automatic qualifier	N/A	No	2000	Quarter-finals (2000)
England	Automatic qualifier	N/A	Semi Final	2000	Runners-up (1975, 1995)
France	Automatic qualifier	N/A	No	2000	Runners-up (1954, 1968)
Scotland	Europe Pool A winners	4 November 2007	No	2000	Group stage (2000)
Ireland	Europe Pool B winners	2 November 2007	Quarter Final	2000	Quarter-finals (2000)
Tonga	Pacific Pool winners	22 October 2006	No	2000	Group stage (1995, 2000)
Fiji	Pacific runners-up	7 October 2006	Semi Final	2000	Group stage (1995, 2000)
Samoa	Repechage winners	14 November 2007	No	2000	Quarter-finals (2000

== Europe ==
=== First round ===
Team	Pld	W	D	L	PF	PA	+/−	Pts	Qualification
Russia	3	3	0	0	108	20	+88	6	Second Round
Georgia	3	2	0	1	102	50	+52	4	Ejected from competition
Netherlands	3	1	0	2	68	123	–55	2	Failed to qualify for World Cup
Serbia	3	0	0	3	42	127	–85	0	Failed to qualify for World Cup

28 April 2006

Netherlands	14–40	Russia

Hook of Holland
Attendance: 250

13 May 2006

Serbia	10–45	Georgia

FK Radnički Stadium, Belgrade
Attendance: 500

26 May 2006

Georgia	57–16	Netherlands

Locomotive Stadium, Tbilisi
Attendance: 10,935

4 June 2006

Serbia	6–44	Russia

FK Radnički Stadium, Belgrade
Attendance: 500

17 June 2006

Netherlands	38–26	Serbia

Rotterdamse RC Beekweg, Rotterdam
Attendance: 250

22 June 2006

Russia	24–0 (Note: The match was originally abandoned after the Georgian team had their visa applications rejected. A subsequent investigation discovered that Georgia had actually been forced to forfeit the match because their players were representing the rugby union team. Georgia were found guilty of bringing the game into disrepute, ejected from the competition and banned from RLIF events for two years; Russia were awarded the match 24–0.)	Georgia

–

=== Second round ===
Group A

Team	Pld	W	D	L	PF	PA	+/−	Pts	Qualification
Scotland	2	1	0	1	37	32	+5	2	Qualified for World Cup
Wales	2	1	0	1	32	37	–5	2	Intercontinental playoff

29 October 2006

Wales
Tries: Briers
Hughes
Johnson
Goal: Briers
14–21

Scotland
Tries: Benn
Brough
Liddell
Nanyn

Goals: Morton
Nanyn

Field Goal: Brough

Brewery Field, Bridgend
Attendance: 2,378

4 November 2007

Scotland	16–18	Wales
Tries: Benn; Fisher; Goals: Brough (4/4)		Tries: Dyer; Gibson; Hughes; Goals: Harris (3/4)

Old Anniesland, Glasgow
Attendance: 911

Group B
Lebanon hosted their home fixtures in England due to the political situation in the Middle East.

Team	Pld	W	D	L	PF	PA	+/−	Pts	Qualification
Ireland	4	2	2	0	142	64	78	6	Qualified for World Cup
Lebanon	4	2	2	0	104	42	62	6	Interncontinental playoff
Russia	4	0	0	4	38	178	−140	0	Failed to qualify for World Cup

22 October 2006

Russia	12–50	Ireland
Tries: Baskakov; Iliassov; Ovchinnikov		Tries: Dodd (3); Bridge (2); Cantillon (2); Littler (2) Goals: Bridge (7/9)

Fili Stadium, Moscow
Attendance: 120

28 October 2006

Lebanon	22–8	Russia

New River Stadium, London
Attendance: 300

5 November 2006

Ireland	18–18	Lebanon
Tries: Grix; Littler; Tandy; Goals: Bridge (3/3)		Tries: Chiha; Koborsi; Salem; Goals: El Masri (2/2); Salem (1/2)

Tolka Park, Dublin
Attendance: 140

20 October 2007

Ireland	58–18	Russia
Tries: Blanch (3); Littler (3); Beswick (2); Gleeson (2); Handforth; Goals: Finn (4/6); Handforth (3/5)		Tries: Baskakov; Logunov; Zagoskin Goals: Grigoryan (2/3); Zdobnikov (1/1)

Oak Park, Carlow
Attendance: 2,958

27 October 2007

Russia	0–48	Lebanon

Nara Stadium, Narofominsk
Attendance: 1,426

2 November 2007

Lebanon	16–16	Ireland
Tries: Farah; Salem; Samia Goals: Nicholas (2)		Tries: Finn; Handforth; Goals: Finn (2); Bridge (2)

Crown Flatt, Dewsbury
Attendance: 6,812

Notes:

- Ireland's Chris Bridge kicked a penalty goal to level the scores in the 77th minute after Lebanon's captain Hassan Saleh conceded a penalty for a high tackle.
- Ireland qualified for the World Cup with a greater points difference than Lebanon, who progressed to the intercontinental repechage.

==== Speculation of match-fixing ====
In early 2011, Ryan Tandy and his agent Sam Ayoub were charged in relation to alleged spot-fixing offences during a 2010 National Rugby League match, prompting speculation about the legitimacy of Ireland and Lebanon's two draws. The 2006 drawn match included Tandy representing Ireland and Ayoub's son Jai Ayoub representing Lebanon. Neither Tandy or Ayoub played in the 2007 match. A police investigation in Australia was dismissed due to "jurisdictional issues." Ireland coach Andy Kelly said in 2011 that he believes the games were played "openly and honestly," and that it was a coincidence both games were drawn.

== Pacific ==
Team	Pld	W	D	L	PF	PA	+/−	Pts	Qualification
Tonga	3	2	0	1	102	54	48	4	Qualified for World Cup
Fiji	3	2	0	1	98	62	36	4	Qualified for World Cup
Samoa	3	2	0	1	86	52	34	4	Advances to the repechage round
Cook Islands	3	0	0	3	24	142	−118	0	Failed to qualify for World Cup

29 September 2006

Tonga	56–14	Cook Islands

Campbelltown Stadium, Sydney
Attendance: 3,013

29 September 2006

Samoa	30–28	Fiji

Campbelltown Stadium, Sydney
Attendance: 3,013

4 October 2006

Fiji	30–28	Tonga

Western Weekender Stadium, Sydney
Attendance: 3,813

4 October 2006

Samoa	46–6	Cook Islands

Western Weekender Stadium, Sydney
Attendance: 3,813

7 October 2006

Fiji	40–4	Cook Islands

CUA Stadium, Penrith
Attendance: 1,713

22 October 2006

Tonga	18–10	Samoa

Headingley, Leeds
Attendance: 5,547

== Other ==
Originally, the USA, Japan, South Africa and West Indies were going to compete in a four-team tournament at Bernie Robbins Stadium, Atlantic City, from 21–28 October.

However, the West Indies and South Africa withdrew before the draw, and a one-off match was played between Japan and the USA.

28 October 2006

United States	54–18	Japan

Aston Community Center Field, Aston
Attendance: 1,200

== Repechage ==
=== Semi-finals ===
9 November 2007

Wales	26–50	Lebanon
Tries: Gibson (3); Blackwood; Bracek; Goals: Harris (2/4); Briers		Tries: Salem (3); El Zbaideh; Kourouche; Moujalli; Ndaira; Saab; Samia Goals: Nicolas (7/9)

Halton Stadium, Widnes
Attendance: 753

9 November 2007

United States	10–42	Samoa

Halton Stadium, Widnes
Attendance: 753

=== Final ===
14 November 2007

Lebanon	16–38	Samoa

Post Office Road, Featherstone
Attendance: 1,323

- Therefore, Samoa qualified for the final position at the World Cup to be held in Australia in 2008.

== See also ==
- Rugby League World Cup
- 2008 Rugby League World Cup

== Sources ==
- "World Cup European Preliminary Qualifying Tournament – Euro B", Rugby League European Federation website, retrieved 8 May 2006
- "Rugby League World Cup 2008 – European Qualifying Group", Rugby League European Federation website, retrieved 15 May 2006
- "Impressive Georgia Outrun Dutch in 2nd Half", Rugby League European Federation website, retrieved 28 May 2006
- "World Cup 2008 – European Qualifying Ground", Rugby League European Federation website, retrieved 20 June 2006
- "The Road to World Cup 2008", Scotland Rugby League website, retrieved 16 July 2006.
