= Vaea Falemaka =

Tonga international rugby league footballer

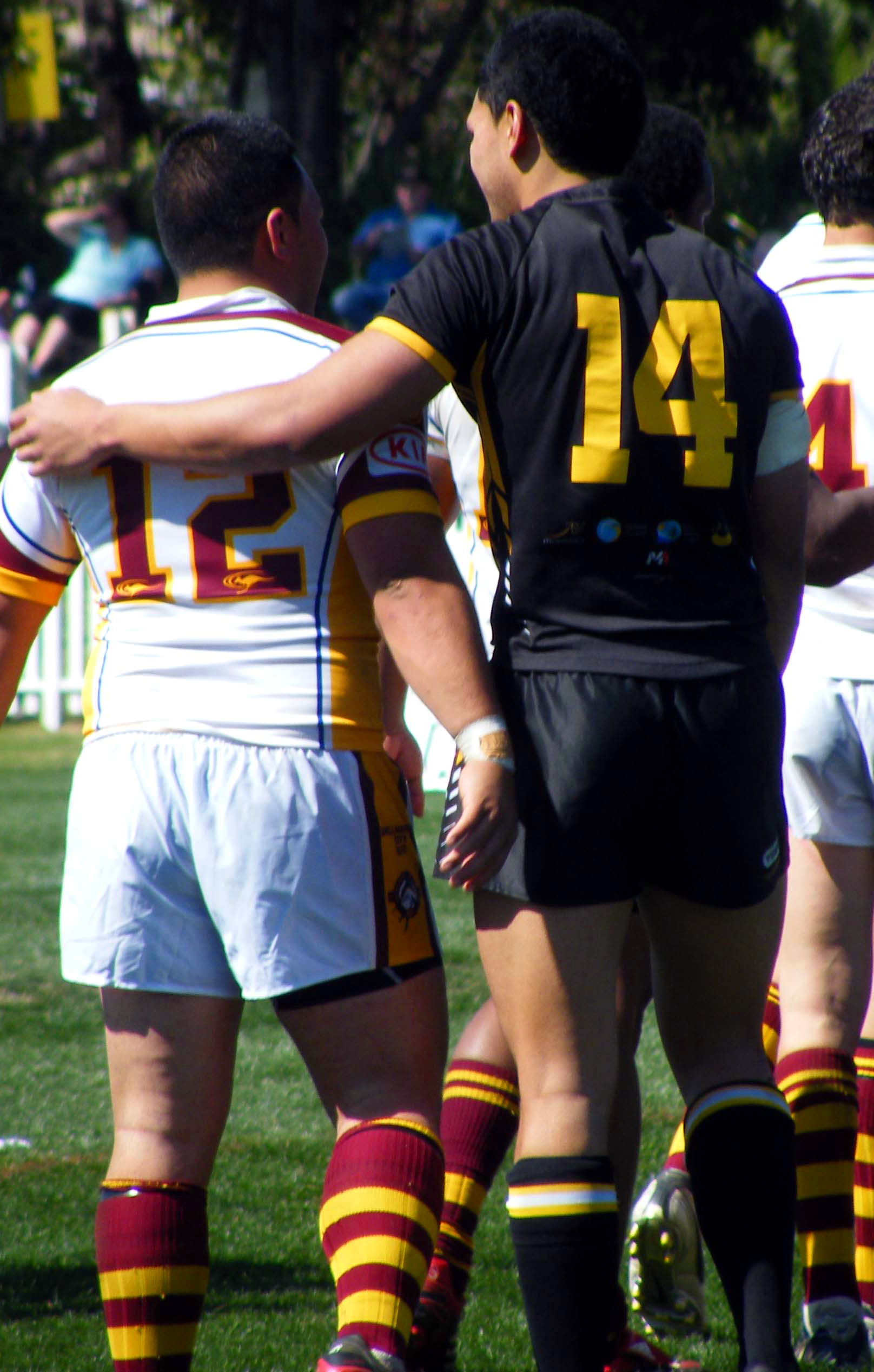

Personal information
- Full name: Joseph Vaea Tangitau Falemaka
- Born: 8 February 1985 (age 40)
- Weight: 104 kg (16 st 5 lb)

Playing information
- Position: Prop
Representative
Years	Team	Pld	T	G	FG	P
2006	Tonga	3	2	0	0	8
- Source: As of 28 July 2019

Joseph Vaea Tangitau Falemaka (born 8 February 1985), also known by the nickname of "Joey", is a Tongan former professional rugby league footballer who played in the 2000s, as a prop.

Falemaka appeared for Tonga in the 2006 Federation Shield competition.

Falemaka made 15 appearances for The North Sydney Bears in The 2007 NSW New South Wales Cup
