= Rugby in the Netherlands =

Rugby in the Netherlands may refer to:

- Rugby league in the Netherlands
- Rugby union in the Netherlands
