= Scotland A national rugby league team =

The Scotland A national rugby league team nicknamed the Bravehearts is made up of amateur players, who either play in the Rugby League Conference the BUCS university league or the Scottish domestic competition. Napier University has also played a huge part in the team, with many Napier students having played in the side over the years. The team regularly compete against England, Wales and Ireland, playing them annually in the Amateur Four Nations. Since the creation of this tournament, in 2002, Scotland have won it just once in 2010. In 2003 Scotland embarked on a mini tour of Europe playing in Netherlands, Italy and Serbia, helping expand rugby league in those countries by playing domestic and national sides. Former player and winner in 2010 Mike Wallace currently coaches the side.

== Squad ==
The following squad was picked for the 2014 Celtic Nations tournament.

Name	Position	Club
Gary Adams		Ayrshire Storm
Tom Aplin	Stand Off	Aberdeen Warriors
Stuart Barlow	Winger	Dundee HSFP
Billy Bissett	Centre	Aberdeen Warriors
Shane Clark	Loose forward	Aberdeen Warriors
Lewis Clarke	Scrum half	Edinburgh Eagles
Stu Fee	Scrum half	Southampton and Guildford
Stuart Gray	Prop	Aberdeen Warriors
Sam Herron	Prop	Glasgow Panthers
Colin Jarvis	Prop	Edinburgh Eagles
Andrew Little	Loose forward	Aberdeen Warriors
Kyle Matheson	Fullback	Ayrshire Storm
Ali Maxwell	Second Row	Ayrshire Storm
Matt McCall	Centre	Aberdeen Warriors
Matt McNee	Second Row	Hull Dockers
Tom Murray	Centre	Edinburgh Eagles
Gregor Ramsay	Winger	Glasgow Panthers
Aaron Robertson	Second Row	Aberdeen Warriors
Lance Tallett	Loose forward	Aberdeen Warriors
David Vernon	Hooker	Edinburgh Eagles
Dom Wallen	Winger	Aberdeen Warriors
Mark Webster		Blackbrook
Grant Walker	Fullback	Aberdeen Warriors

== Results ==
Date	Result	Competition	Venue
25 October 1997	Ireland A 25-18 Scotland A	Friendly	Blackrock College, Dublin
30 May 1998	Scotland A 16-21 Ireland A	Friendly	Bellsland Park, Kilmarnock
3 October 1998	Wales A 18-28 Scotland A	Friendly	Pandy Park, Crosskeys
19 September 1999	Scotland A 20-20 Wales A	Friendly	Portobello RFC, Edinburgh
19 August 2000	Scotland A 10-20 Wales A	Friendly	Glasgow
9 September 2001	Scotland A 12-28 Ireland A	Friendly	Glasgow
16 September 2001	Scotland A 30-36 Wales A	Friendly	The Boulevard Hull
15 June 2002	Scotland A 22-40 Wales A	Amateur Four Nations	Old Anniesland, Glasgow
20 July 2002	Scotland A 8-58 England A	Amateur Four Nations	Glasgow
18 August 2002	Ireland A 70-10 Scotland A	Amateur Four Nations	Belfast
21 June 2003	England A 28-20 Scotland A	Amateur Four Nations	Elm Park Way, York
9 July 2003	Netherlands 18-22 Scotland A	European Tour	Sassenheim
11 July 2003	Italy 10-30 Scotland A	European Tour	Stadio Plebiscito, Padua
13 July 2003	Serbia 22-42 Scotland A	European Tour	Grotska
27 July 2003	Wales A 42-22 Scotland A	Amateur Four Nations	Brewery Field, Bridgend
9 August 2003	Scotland A 48-20 Ireland A	Amateur Four Nations	Queens Park, Glasgow
13 June 2004	Scotland A 26-28 England A	Amateur Four Nations	Hamilton RFC, Hamilton
3 July 2004	Scotland A 26-34 Wales A	Amateur Four Nations	Glasgow
22 August 2004	Ireland A 16-24 Scotland A	Amateur Four Nations	Navan R.F.C., County Meath
12 June 2005	Wales A 70-8 Scotland A	Amateur Four Nations	Brewery Field, Bridgend
23 July 2005	England A 16-17 Scotland A	Amateur Four Nations	New River Stadium, London Skolars
14 August 2005	Scotland A 44-16 Ireland A	Amateur Four Nations	Glasgow
3 June 2006	Ireland A 38-30 Scotland A	Amateur Four Nations	St Mary's College RFC, Dublin
? June 2006	Scotland A ?-? France A	Friendly	Glasgow
16 July 2006	Scotland A 16-22 Wales A	Amateur Four Nations	Lochinch RFC, Glasgow
13 August 2006	Scotland A 14-46 England A	Amateur Four Nations	Glasgow
16 June 2007	Wales A 44-30 Scotland A	Amateur Four Nations	Brewery Field, Bridgend
21 July 2007	England A 42-40 Scotland A	Amateur Four Nations	Gateshead International Stadium, Gateshead
11 August 2007	Scotland A 18-28 Ireland A	Amateur Four Nations	Old Anniesland Glasgow
21 June 2008	Scotland A 20-62 Wales A	Amateur Four Nations	Cartha Queens Park, Glasgow
26 July 2008	Ireland A 26-28 Scotland A	Amateur Four Nations	Dublin
16 August 2008	Scotland A 26-24 England A	Amateur Four Nations	Edinburgh
13 June 2009	Scotland A 22-30 Ireland A	Amateur Four Nations	Edinburgh
11 July 2009	Wales A 32-12 Scotland	Amateur Four Nations	Glan-yr-Afon Park, Blackwood Bulldogs, Caerphilly
8 August 2009	England A 24-40 Scotland A	Amateur Four Nations	Staines RFC, London
13 June 2010	Scotland A 34-32 England A	Amateur Four Nations	GHA RFC, Glasgow
10 July 2010	Ireland A 6-10 Scotland A	Amateur Four Nations	Terenure College RFC, Dublin
14 August 2010	Scotland A 35-22 Wales A	Amateur Four Nations	Edinburgh
25 June 2011	England A 30-22 Scotland A	Amateur Four Nations	Stanningley Rugby League club, Leeds
16 July 2011	Wales A 34-22 Scotland A	Amateur Four Nations	Virginia Park, Caerphilly
13 August 2011	Scotland A 26-8 Ireland A	Amateur Four Nations	Scotstoun Stadium, Glasgow
21 July 2012	Scotland A 48-14 England A	Amateur Four Nations	Falkirk RFC
13 August 2012	Scotland A 36-16 Wales A	Amateur Four Nations	Scotstoun Stadium, Glasgow
10 August 2013	Scotland A 38-26 Ireland A	Amateur Four Nations	Falkirk RFC
24 August 2013	Wales A 64-18 Scotland A	Amateur Four Nations	Eirias Stadium, Colwyn Bay
15 September 2013	England A 94-0 Scotland A	Amateur Four Nations	Wath Brow Hornets ARLFC
10 August 2014	Scotland A 18-16 Wales A	Celtic Nations Cup	Woodside Sports Complex, Aberdeen
16 August 2014	Ireland A 44-10 Scotland A	Celtic Nations Cup	Ashbourne RFC

== See also ==
- Scotland national rugby league team match results
- List of Scotland national rugby league team players
- Amateur Four Nations
