= Saint Patrick's Day Test =

Rugby league competition (1995–2012)

Saint Patrick's Day Rugby League Test match
- Sport: Rugby league
- Instituted: 1995
- Number of teams: 2
- Region: International (RLIF)
- Most titles: United States (5 titles)
- Related competition: Colonial Cup

The Saint Patrick's Day Test also known as the Donnybrook Cup was an international rugby league football match played between the United States and Ireland from 1995 to 2012. The game was usually held on or around March 17 to coincide with Saint Patrick's Day.

There have been eight matches, with five won by the USA and three won by Ireland. Ireland competed as a full test side for the first two matches, winning both. In 2020 the first two fixtures were regarded to full international status as the Ireland A teams for those two games were upgraded to senior national status, due to the similarity of the squads involved in those games. In 2021 USARL and RLI were in talks to re-establish back the fixture in 2023. However, the match never took place.

== Matches ==
Date	Home	Score	Away	Venue	Attendance	Ref.
16 March 1995	United States	22–24	Ireland	(United States) RFK Stadium, Washington D.C.		
16 March 1996	United States	12–14	Ireland	(United States) RFK Stadium, Washington D.C.	2,500	
18 March 2000	United States	19–6	Ireland A	(United States) Glen Mills Schools, Glen Mills, PA		
16 March 2002	United States	24–22	Ireland A	(United States) Glen Mills Schools, Glen Mills, PA		
15 March 2003	United States	20–16	Ireland A	(United States) Glen Mills Schools, Glen Mills, PA		
24 March 2004	United States	41–10	Ireland A	Memorial Stadium, Savannah, Georgia		
22 March 2011	United States	8–26	Ireland A	(United States) Charles Martin Memorial Stadium, Philadelphia	1,000	
18 March 2012	United States	38–20	Ireland A	(United States) Widener University, Philadelphia	c. 2000	
