= Amsterdam Cobras =

Dutch rugby league club, based in Amsterdam

Club information
- Full name: Amsterdam Cobras Rugby League Club
- Nickname(s): Cobras
- Colours: Red; Black
- Founded: 2014; 11 years ago

Current details
- Ground(s): Amsterdam Rugby Club Amsterdam
- CEO: (Netherlands) Daan van Rossum
- Coach: (Australia) Brett Davidson
- Manager: (Netherlands) Niels Straatmeijer
- Captain: (England) James Adams
- Competition: Dutch Rugby League Competition

Uniforms
Home colours

Records
- Premierships: 2 (2018, 2023)

The Amsterdam Cobras are a rugby league football club based in Amsterdam, Netherlands. They compete in the Netherlands Rugby League Bond (NRLB) domestic competition called Dutch Rugby League Competition, as well as internationally. They finished third in the 2017 and 2019 Rotterdam Nines. In 2018 the Cobras won their first Championship after defeating the Den Haag Knights RLFC 29-28 in extra time.

== See also ==
- Netherlands Rugby League Bond
- Netherlands national rugby league team
