= London 9s =

Rugby league nines tournament

- Sport: Rugby league
- Instituted: 2018
- Inaugural season: 2018
- Current Champions: Africa United (African Union) (men's) Roots Rugby (United States) (women's)

The London 9s is a rugby league nines tournament held annually in London, United Kingdom by East London RFC. It was first held in 2018 with 24 teams taking part. The Wan Papua Warriors won the men's title and Castleford Tigers won the women's tournament.

== Results ==
Men's Open finals
Year	Winner	Score	Runners-up	Ref
2018	Wan Papua Warriors	12–4	(England) London Spartans	
2019	(African Union) Africa United	12–4	(United States) Roots Rugby	

Men's Social finals
Year	Winner	Score	Runners-up	Ref
2018				
2019	(England) London Skolars U20s	14–10	(Lithuania) Lietuva Rugby League	

Women's finals
Year	Winner	Score	Runners-up	Ref
2018	(England) Castleford Tigers	16–4	MoSis	
2019	(United States) Roots Rugby	24–6	(United Kingdom) Royal Air Force	

== Rules ==
The vast majority of rules is played under the rugby league 9s format of the sport although major rule changes include:

- Fifteen minute games
- No half time
- Unlimited interchange

== See also ==
- Rugby league nines
