= Rugby League World Cup 9s =

Rugby league 9s competition

- Current season or competition: 2019 Rugby League World Cup 9s
- Sport: Rugby league
- Inaugural season: 2019
- Number of teams: 12 (Men); 4 (Women)
- Region: International (IRL)
- Related competition: Rugby League World Cup; Women's Rugby League World Cup; Wheelchair Rugby League World Cup

The Rugby League World Cup 9s was an international tournament played in the rugby league nines tournament.

The inaugural World Cup 9s took place on 18 and 19 October 2019 at the Bankwest Stadium in Sydney, New South Wales, Australia. The women's competition was won by New Zealand, and the men's competition by the hosts Australia. The tournament, like the XIII's tournament, was intended to be held every four years. However the 2023 tournament, which was due to be held in Australia, was cancelled due to the New South Wales Government withdrawing support after the COVID-19 pandemic.

== Results ==
Year	Host(s)	Men						Women			
Year	Host(s)	Final			Losing semi finalists		Teams	Final			Teams
Year	Host(s)	Winner	Score	Runner-up	Losing semi finalists		Teams	Winner	Score	Runner-up	Teams
2019	(Australia) Sydney	Australia	24–10	New Zealand	England	Samoa	12	New Zealand	17–15	Australia	4

== See also ==
- Rugby league nines
- Rugby League World Cup
