= Paul Handforth =

Ireland international rugby league footballer

Paul "Tiger" Handforth
Personal information
- Full name: Paul Handforth
- Born: 6 October 1981 (age 45) Wakefield, West Yorkshire, England

Playing information
- Height: 5 ft 9 in (1.75 m)
- Weight: 13 st 1 lb (83 kg)
- Position: Stand-off
Club
Years	Team	Pld	T	G	FG	P
2000–04	Wakefield Trinity Wildcats	66	11	13	0	70
2005–06	Castleford Tigers	40	6	22	1	69
2007–08	Featherstone Rovers	50	25	16	5	137
2009	Doncaster	9	4	7	0	30
2009–11	Batley Bulldogs	66	16	93	1	251
2012–13	Halifax	61	14	23	1	103
2014–16	Keighley Cougars	70	30	63	2	248
	Total	362	106	237	10	908
Representative
Years	Team	Pld	T	G	FG	P
2003–11	Ireland	8	0	0	0	0

Paul Handforth (born 6 October 1981), also known by the nickname of "Tiger", is a professional rugby league footballer who most recently played for Keighley in the Championship 1.

== Background ==
Paul Handforth was born in Wakefield, West Yorkshire, England, he is the son of the rugby league footballer who played in the 1960s, 1970s and 1980s for Wakefield Trinity, Hunslet and Oldham; Tony "Tiger" Handforth, and the brother of Matt Handforth, who also played for Featherstone Rovers.

== Playing career ==
Handforth's position of choice is at stand-off, but he can also operate at scrum-half and as a hooker.

He has previously played for Halifax, the Batley Bulldogs, Doncaster, the Wakefield Trinity Wildcats, and the Castleford Tigers in the Super League. He started playing rugby with the Methley Monarchs ARLFC as a schoolboy and also played for the Oulton Raiders.

Handforth is an Ireland international.

He was named in the Ireland training squad for the 2008 Rugby League World Cup.

After leaving Keighley and retiring from the professional game, Handforth joined amateur team Fryston Warriors, and played for them against Keighley in the 2017 Challenge Cup third round tie between the two clubs.
