= Den Haag Knights RLFC =

Dutch rugby league club, based in The Hague

Den Haag Knights

Club information
- Full name: Den Haag Knights Rugby League Football Club
- Nickname: Knights
- Colours
- Founded: 2015; 11 years ago
- Website: http://www.dhknights.com

Current details
- Grounds: Haagsche Rugby Club (500); Segbroek College (300)
- CEO: (New Zealand) Paul Dirkzwager
- Coach: TBC
- Manager: Matthew Rigby
- Captain: Paul Dirkzwager
- Competition: NRLB Championship
- 2025: 3rd

Uniforms
Home colours

Records
- Premierships: 1 (2019)
- Runners-up: 5 (2015, 2016, 2017, 2018, 2022)
- Minor premierships: 4 (2017, 2018, 2019, 2022)
- Most capped: (England) Frank Longhurst – 23
- Highest points scorer: (Republic of Ireland) Thomas Farrell – 184

The Den Haag Knights are a rugby league football club based in The Hague (Den Haag), Netherlands. They compete in the Nederlandse Rugby League Bond Championship, as well as internationally.

== Seasons ==
Season	League								Play-offs	Refs
Season	Division	P	W	D	L	PD	Pts	Pos	Play-offs	Refs
2015	BNRL	3	2	1	0	22	11	2nd	Lost in Grand Final	
2016	NRLB	4	2	0	2	-28	4	2nd	Lost in Grand Final	
2017	NRLB	6	5	0	1	212	16	1st	Lost in Grand Final	
2018	NRLB	6	5	0	1	152	10	1st	Lost in Grand Final	
2019	NRLB	6	4	1	1	80	9	1st	Won in Grand Final	
2020	NRLB	Cancelled due to the COVID-19 pandemic (Note: In 2021, the championship was replaced by a nines tournament, won by Den Haag Knights)								
2021	NRLB	Cancelled due to the COVID-19 pandemic								
2022	NRLB	4	4	0	0	128	8	1st	Lost in Grand Final	
2023	NRLB	4	2	0	2	68	4	4th	Won third-place play-off	
2024	NRLB							4th	Lost third-place play-off	
2025	NRLB									

== See also ==
- Netherlands Rugby League Bond
- Netherlands national rugby league team
