= Nederlandse Rugby League Bond Championship =

- Sport: Rugby league
- Formerly known as: BNRL Championship
- Inaugural season: 2015
- Number of teams: 6
- Country: Netherlands
- Champions: Brabant Bears (2nd title) (2025)
- Most titles: Amsterdam Cobras; Brabant Bears; Rotterdam Pitbulls; (2 titles)
- Website: NRLB
- Broadcast partner: YouTube

The Nederlandse Rugby league Bond Championship, also known as NRLB Championship, is a semi-professional competition and the top-tier of rugby League of the Netherlands. As of 2025, it consists of six teams. In 2014, a two-game series was held between Amsterdam City Cobras and Rotterdam City Pitbulls for the 'NRLB Nationale Kampioenschap' with each team winning one game. The first league competition began in 2015 as a joint Dutch-Belgian venture called the BNRL Championship and became a Dutch only competition the following season.

== Current clubs ==
Location of teams in the 2025 NRLB Championship

Club	Location
Den Haag Knights	Haagsche Rugby Club, The Hague
Harderwijk Dolphins	Harderwijk
Rotterdam Pitbulls	Rotterdamse Rugby Club, Rotterdam
Zwolle Wolves	Rugby Club Zwolle, Zwolle
Amsterdam Cobras	Sportpark Jagersveld, Zaandam
Brabant Bears	Oisterwijk

== Results ==
The finals are traditionally held by the current trophy holders. Prior to the 2019 season, the Grand Final trophy was renamed the Jason Bruygoms Trophy in honour of the NRLB development officer who played a key role in developing rugby league in the Netherlands before stepping down following the conclusion of the 2018 season.

Grand Finals
Year	Winners	Score	Runner-up	Location	Ref
2015	North Brussels Gorillas	48–6	Den Haag Knights	Petit Chemin Vert, Brussels, Belgium	
2016	Rotterdam Pitbulls	42–18	Den Haag Knights	Dordrecht RC, South Holland	
2017	Rotterdam Pitbulls	26–24	Den Haag Knights	Rotterdamse Studenten RC, South Holland	
2018	Amsterdam Cobras	29–28 (AET)	Den Haag Knights	Sparta RC, Capelle aan den Ijssel, South Holland	
2019	Den Haag Knights	20–16	Amsterdam Cobras	NRCA Stadion, Amsterdam, North Holland	
2020	Season cancelled – Covid-19				
2021	Season replaced with nines tournament				
2022	Zwolle Wolves	32–28	Den Haag Knights	Haagse RC, The Hague	
2023	Amsterdam Cobras	18–16	Zwolle Wolves	Rugby Club Zwolle, Zwolle	
2024	Brabant Bears	26–16	Zwolle Wolves	SportPark Jagersveld, Zaandam, North Holland	
2025	Brabant Bears	28–24 (AET)	Zwolle Wolves	RFC Oisterwijk Oysters, Oisterwijk	

=== Champions ===
Grand Final winners and runners up
	Club	Winners	Runners-up	Years won	Years runner-up
1	Amsterdam Cobras	2	1	2018, 2023	2019
2=	Brabant Bears	2	0	2024, 2025	
2=	Rotterdam Pitbulls	2	0	2016, 2017	
4	Den Haag Knights	1	5	2019	2015, 2016, 2017, 2018, 2022
5	Zwolle Wolves	1	3	2022	2023, 2024, 2025
6	North Brussels Gorillas	1	0	2015	

=== The Double ===
In rugby league, the term 'the Double' is referring to the achievement of a club that tops the league table and wins the final in the same season. To date, this has been achieved by a total two different clubs.

	Club	Wins	Winning years
1	Rotterdam Pitbulls	1	2016
1	Den Haag Knights RLFC	1	2019

== Seasons ==
=== 2015 Competition ===
2015 standings (Note: League table: Qualified for Grand Final, Qualified for semi-final)
	Team	P	W	D	L	PD	Pts
1	North Brussels Gorillas	3	2	1	0	102	11
2	Den Haag Knights	3	2	1	0	22	11
3	Rotterdam Pitbulls	3	1	0	2	-36	6
4	Amsterdam Cobras	3	0	0	3	-88	2

The 2015 competition was fought out between Amsterdam Cobras, Den Haag Knights, Rotterdam Pitbulls and North Brussels Gorillas (Belgium). The North Brussels Gorillas won the inaugural competition after defeating Den Haag Knights 48-6 in the Grand Final. Rotterdam Pitbulls defeated Amsterdam Cobras 52–22 in the third-place play-off.

=== 2016 Competition ===
2016 standings
	Team	P	W	D	L	PD	Pts
1	Rotterdam Pitbulls	4	4	0	0	172	8
2	Den Haag Knights	4	2	0	2	-28	4
3	Amsterdam Cobras	4	0	0	4	-144	0

In the 2016 season, the North Brussels Gorillas left the competition to compete in the Belgium League and the Dutch league became a three-team competition. At the start of the season the NRLB announced that Harderwijk Dolphins, who had been established in late 2015, had been admitted to join the league in 2017, but would play only friendlies in 2016.

The Grand Final took place at Dordrecht Rugby Club on 18 June 2016. It was won by Rotterdam Pitbulls who defeated Den Haag Knights 42–18 both teams qualified by finishing in the Top 2 after all league matches were completed. In lieu of a third-place play-off, Harderwijk Dolphins played Amsterdam Cobras as the curtain raiser to the match.

=== 2017 Competition ===
2017 standings
	Team	P	W	D	L	B	PF	PA	PD	Pts
1	Den Haag Knights	6	5	0	1	6	312	100	212	16
2	Rotterdam Pitbulls	6	5	0	1	6	210	154	56	16
3	Amsterdam Cobras	6	2	0	4	4	94	238	-144	8
4	Harderwijk Dolphins	6	0	0	6	4	112	236	-124	4

The 2017 season, saw the return of a four-team competition with Harderwijk Dolphins joining the league. Den Haag Knights and Rotterdam Pitbulls finished the regular season level on points, with their only losses coming against each other. The finals day was a repeat of the 2016 season with Harderwijk Dolphins defeating Amsterdam Cobras in the third-place match and Rotterdam Pitbulls retaining the title with a 26–24 win over Den Haag Knights in the Grand Final. At the end of the season, the NRLB hosted a touring RAF team. They played against a Dutch Development XII and two combined teams; the Dams (Amsterdam Cobras and Rotterdam Pitbulls) and KDC (Den Haag Knights and Harderwijk Dolphins) with the RAF winning all three matches.

=== 2018 Competition ===
2018 standings
	Team	P	W	D	L	PF	PA	PD	Pts
1	Den Haag Knights	6	5	0	1	242	90	152	10
2	Amsterdam Cobras	6	5	0	1	254	110	144	10
3	Rotterdam Pitbulls	6	2	0	4	160	214	-54	3*
4	Harderwijk Dolphins	6	0	0	6	56	298	-242	0

In the 2018 season, the Grand Final match between Amsterdam Cobras and Den Haag Knights was won 29–28 by the Cobras in golden point extra time consigning the Knights to a fourth consecutive Grand Final defeat. The third-place play-off was won 40–28 by Rotterdam Pitbulls.

=== 2019 Competition ===
2019 standings
	Team	P	W	D	L	PF	PA	PD	Pts
1	Den Haag Knights	6	4	1	1	210	130	80	9
2	Amsterdam Cobras	6	4	1	1	208	146	62	9
3	Rotterdam Pitbulls	6	2	0	4	130	162	-54	5
4	Harderwijk Dolphins	6	1	0	5	134	244	-110	2

In the 2019 season, Den Haag Knights reached the Grand Final for the fifth time and recorded their first win, 20–18 over Amsterdam Cobras, becoming the first team to lift trophy since it had been renamed in honour of NRLB development officer Jason Bruygoms. Harderwijk Dolphins took third-place after Rotterdam Pitbulls forfeited their play-off match.

=== 2020 and 2021 Competition ===
The 2020 season was cancelled due to the COVID-19 pandemic in the Netherlands and due to uncertainty over ongoing restrictions the NRLB organised a rugby league nines tournament in place of the Championship.

=== 2022 Competition ===
2022 standings
	Team	P	W	D	L	PD	Pts
1	Den Haag Knights	4	4	0	0	128	8
2	Zwolle Wolves	4	2	1	1	30	5
3	Amsterdam Cobras	4	1	1	2	-32	3
4	Harderwijk Dolphins	4	1	0	3	-20	2
5	Rotterdam Pitbulls	4	1	0	3	-106	2

In the 2022 season, the league expanded to five-teams with Zwolle Wolves joining the competition. The debutants defeated Den Haag Knights in the Grand Final with Rotterdam Pitbulls winning the third-place play-off against Amsterdam Cobras.

=== 2023 Competition ===
2023 standings
	Team	P	W	D	L	PD	Pts
1	Zwolle Wolves	4	3	0	1	70	6
2	Amsterdam Cobras	4	2	1	2	2	5
3	Rotterdam Pitbulls	4	2	1	1	0	5
4	Den Haag Knights	4	2	0	2	68	4
5	Harderwijk Dolphins	4	0	0	3	-130	0

In the 2023 season, Amsterdam claimed a second title by defeating Zwolle Wolves in the Grand Final. In the third-place match Den Haag Knights won against Rotterdam Pitbulls.

=== 2024 Competition ===
2024 standings
	Team	Pts
1	Zwolle Wolves	6
2	Amsterdam Cobras	6
3	Brabant Bears	6
4	Den Haag Knights	2
5	Harderwijk Dolphins	0
6	Rotterdam Pitbulls	-5

The league expanded to six teams in 2024 with the addition of Brabant Bears. They won the competition by defeating Zwolle Wolves 26–16 in the Grand Final. Amsterdam Cobras won the third-place match against Den Haag Knights.

=== 2025 Competition ===
The start of the 2025 season was delayed by two weeks causing the first round of the play-offs to be cancelled and meaning teams would qualify directly for the Grand Final, 3rd/4th and 5th/6th place play-offs. In early July, Harderwijk Dolphins withdrew from the competition and all their fixtures were recorded as 30–0 losses. In the Grand Final, Brabant Bears defeated Zwolle Wolves 28–24 in golden point extra time to retain the title.

=== Clubs by season ===
Notes:

- No Championship in 2020 and 2021 seasons

== See also ==
- Netherlands national rugby league team
- List of rugby league competitions
