= Frank Samia =

Australian international rugby league footballer

Personal information
- Born: 9 October 1981 (age 44)
- Height: 185 cm (6 ft 1 in)
- Weight: 95 kg (14 st 13 lb)

Playing information
- Position: Centre
Representative
Years	Team	Pld	T	G	FG	P
2002–07	Lebanon	7	6	0	0	24
- Source: As of 31 August 2008

Frank Samia (born 9 October 1981) is an Australian former professional rugby league footballer who represented Lebanon. His position of choice was at centre.

Samia played in the first grade for the St George Illawarra Dragons.
