= Anthony Farah =

Lebanon international rugby league player

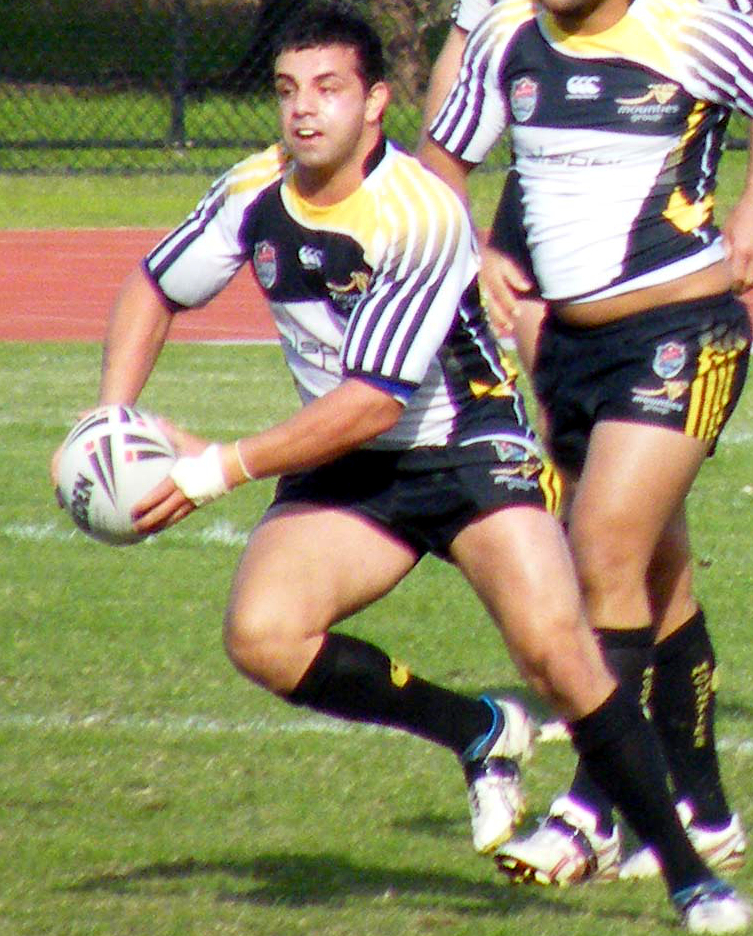
- Farah in 2011

Personal information
- Full name: Anthony Farah

Playing information
- Position: Hooker
Representative
Years	Team	Pld	T	G	FG	P
2002–	Lebanon	9	5	2	0	24
- Source: As of 15 September 2016

Anthony Farah is a Lebanese professional rugby league player who has played as a hooker for the Mount Pritchard Mounties in the New South Wales Cup. He also played in another cup and both won Round 1 and 2 in 2002, Round 6 in 2003. Lebanon vs France was 36-6, Lebanon vs Serbia was 102-0 and Lebanon vs France was 26-18. It was named the Mediterranean Cup 2002 and 2003.

Farah is a Lebanese international. He captained the Lebanon side in their 36-10 win over Malta on 8 Oct 2006 in Sydney.
