= Rotterdam Pitbulls =

Dutch rugby league team, based in Rotterdam

Club information
- Full name: Rotterdam Pitbulls Rugby League Football Club
- Nickname: Pitbulls
- Colours: Brown; White
- Founded: 2014; 12 years ago

Current details
- Ground: Rotterdam Rugby Club Rotterdam
- Competition: Dutch Rugby League Competition

The Rotterdam Pitbulls are a rugby league football club based in Rotterdam, Netherlands. They compete in the Netherlands Rugby League Bond (NRLB) domestic competition called Dutch Rugby League Competition, as well as internationally.

== History ==
The Rotterdam Pitbulls was started by a group of enthusiastic players, training at local parks throughout Rotterdam. They then formed an official Dutch Rugby Team in December 2014.

== 2016 Domestic Competition Results Pitbulls ==
=== Game 1 April 16th Away ===
Amsterdam Cobras 14 - Rotterdam Pitbulls 60

=== Game 2 April 23rd Home ===
Rotterdam Pitbulls 88 - Den Haag Knights 20

=== Game 3 May 14th Home ===
Rotterdam Pitbulls 64 - Amsterdam Cobras 12

=== Game 4 June 3rd Away ===
Den Haag Knights 28 - Rotterdam Pitbulls 34

=== Game 5 Final June 18th Away ===
Rotterdam Pitbulls 42 - Den Haag Knights 16

== See also ==
- Netherlands Rugby League Bond
- Netherlands national rugby league team
