= Federation Shield =

Rugby league competition

- Sport: Rugby league
- Inaugural season: 2006
- Number of teams: 4
- Region: International (IRL)
- Holders: England (2006)
- Most titles: England (1 title)

The Federation Shield was an international rugby league competition held in 2006. The competition was organised by the Rugby Football League and was contested by England, France, Samoa and Tonga, and took place at the same time as the 2006 Tri-Nations series. England defeated Tonga 32–14 in the final.

== Results ==
2006-10-22

England	26–10	France
	Report

Headingley, Leeds
Attendance: 5,547

2006-10-22

Samoa	10–18	Tonga
	Report

Headingley, Leeds
Attendance: 5,547

2006-10-29

France	28–6	Samoa

Benichou Stadium, Colomiers
Attendance: 6,000 (approx.)

2006-10-29

England	40–18	Tonga
	Report

Twickenham Stoop, London
Attendance: 2,388

2006-11-05

France	10–48	Tonga

Municipal Stadium Pierre Antoine, Castres
Attendance: 8,500 (approx.)

2006-11-05

England	38–14	Samoa
	Report

KC Stadium, Hull
Attendance: 5,698

=== Standings ===
Team	Played	Won	Drew	Lost	For	Against	Difference	Points
England	3	3	0	0	104	42	+62	6
Tonga	3	2	0	1	84	60	+24	4
France	3	1	0	2	48	80	−32	2
Samoa	3	0	0	3	30	84	−54	0

=== Final ===
2006-11-12

England	32–14	Tonga
	Report

Halton Stadium, Widnes
Attendance: 8000 (approx.)
Referee: Richard Silverwood

Rob Purdham captained the victorious England side in this tournament, with Matt Diskin as the vice-captain. The Paul Cullen coached side entered the final as favourites following a successful group stage with three wins from three matches.
