= Haworth Park =

Rugby league club in Kingston upon Hull, East Riding of Yorkshire, England

Club information
- Colours: Oxford blue and white
- Website: www.haworthparkarlfc.co.uk

Current details
- Ground(s): Haworth Park, Hull
- Competition: Rugby League Conference Yorkshire Premier

Haworth Park was a rugby league team based in Kingston upon Hull, East Riding of Yorkshire, England. They play in the Yorkshire Premier division of the Rugby League Conference with their A-team taking part in the Yorkshire & Humber Merit League.

== History ==
East Riding joined the Midlands Merit League in 2007 and went on to win the Shield beating Nottingham Outlaws Academy side 32-26. The new year, East Riding joined the Yorkshire division of the Rugby League Conference.

The newly renamed East Riding Rangers stepped up to the Rugby League Conference Yorkshire Premier in 2009 and their A-team joined the Yorkshire pool of the RL Merit League. For the 2010 season, the team adopted the name Haworth Park and joined the Yorkshire Premier Division of the RLC. Haworth Park failed to complete the season in the Yorkshire Premier Division.

In June 2011 the clubhouse fell victim to an arson attack. Extensive damage was done to the changing rooms and the function rooms. Despite this, volunteers assisted by donations from local businesses were able to have the venue open again in 4 weeks.

2013 saw the club rejuvenated with three football teams getting involved with the on site football pitch, Halford Cup Champions C-Force United A, C-Force United B and Pinefleet Athletic teams joining the club.

== Club honours ==
- Midlands Merit League Shield: 2007
