= North Dublin Eagles =

Irish rugby league club, based in Dublin

North Dublin Eagles were an Irish rugby league team from Dublin, Ireland. The team was based in Raheny on Northside Dublin. The Eagles played their home games at ALSAA and trained on Tuesdays and Thursdays at St. Paul's College, Raheny.

== See also ==
- Rugby league in Ireland
- List of rugby league competitions
