= Virginia Park (Caerphilly) =

- The Vetro Recruitment Stadium
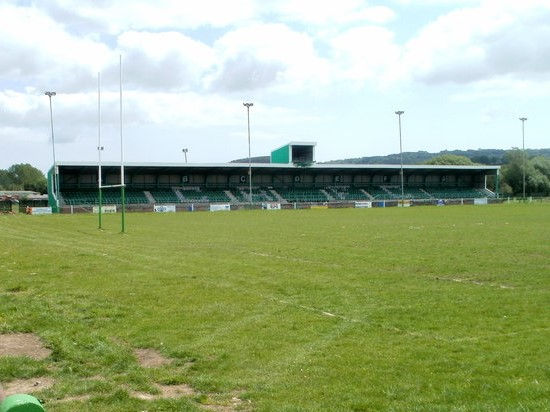
- Interactive map of Virginia Park
- Location: Caerphilly, South Wales
- Coordinates: 51°34′54.6″N 3°13′1.2″W
- Capacity: 6,000
- Record attendance: 5,167 (Cardiff Blues v. Newport Gwent Dragons, Pro12, 6 May 2017)
- Surface: Grass

Virginia Park is a rugby ground, cricket ground and former greyhound racing stadium in Caerphilly, South Wales. It is currently the home ground for Caerphilly RFC.

== Location and origins ==
The rugby ground is accessed from Virginia Close and the cricket ground is accessed from Melville Terrace. Both roads are off the Pontygwindy Road. The name Virginia Park came from the state of Virginia in the United States because during the American Revolution the loyalist John Goodrich and his family fled to Caerphilly and settled on the Energlyn Estate that they had purchased. The main house was called Virginia House and it remained so for the next one hundred years.

== Rugby union ==
On 26 August 1887 a committee sitting at the Castle Hotel formed Caerphilly RFC. The ground has remained their home with the exception of a period when they disbanded. Originally known as the Virginia Park Athletic Grounds it was little more than a very large field in 1887. After World War II the greyhound stadium closed and was eventually demolished and the rugby club returned to play fixtures at Virginia Park afterwards and in the late fifties they finally called Virginia Park their home with the pitch being relocated to the northern section of the park. The Stadium was known as the Constructaquote Stadium for the 2017–2018 season but for the 2018–2019 season known as the Vetro Recruitment Stadium.

== Greyhound racing ==
The greyhound stadium was located in the central area of Virginia Park. A grandstand was constructed in 1931 by the greyhound company and the opening night was on 23 May 1931. The stadium raced under the National Greyhound Racing Club (NGRC) rules of racing. Many other events took place there and included boxing, speedway, trotting and Powderhall foot racing in addition to being used as a venue for politicians. The stadium stopped racing under NGRC rules in 1935.

The demise of greyhound racing at Virginia Park came during World War II. It was used as a storage depot for the fire brigade and a recreation area for American soldiers during the war.
