= Netherlands Rugby League Bond =

Rugby league governing body in Netherlands

- Founded: 24 April 2009; 17 years ago
- ERL affiliation: February 2012 (observer); June 2017 (affiliate)
- Responsibility: Netherlands
- Key people: (Netherlands) Daan van Rossum (President) (United Kingdom) Matt Rigby (Chief Executive)
- Coach: (New Zealand) Dave Hunter
- Competitions: Dutch Rugby League Competition
- Website: rugbyleague.nl

(Netherlands)

The Netherlands Rugby League Bond (NRLB) is the governing body for the sport of rugby league football in the Netherlands. Formed in 2009, they obtained observer status with the RLEF (now European Rugby League) in February 2012, and affiliate membership in June 2017.

== See also ==
- Rugby league in the Netherlands
- Netherlands national rugby league team
- Dutch Rugby League Competition
