= Old Penarthians RFC =

- Full name: Old Penarthians Rugby Football Club
- Nickname(s): The Old Pens
- Founded: 1923
- Location: Penarth, Wales
- Ground(s): Cwrt Y Vil (Capacity: 200)
- Chairman: Stephen Clarke
- Coach(es): Jake Thomas / Luke Ford
- League(s): WRU Division 3B
- 2020/21: 7th

Official website
- oldpenarthians.rfc.wales

Old Penarthians Rugby Football Club is a Welsh rugby union team based in Penarth, Wales. The Old Penarthians were formed out of an association set up on 7 December 1923 by Penarth County School. The society formed was the Penarth County School Old Boys Association and it covered the games of cricket, hockey, and rugby union. In their first full season during 1924/25 the club won ten matches, drew two, and lost nine.

During the 1920s there was pressure from Penarth RFC for the Penarth C.S.O.B. to merge with their more established team, but these moves were resisted. In 1938 the rugby team decided to part from their old organisation and Old Penarthians RFC were formed. In 1961 Old Penarthians applied for probationary membership of the Welsh Rugby Union and became full members in 1964.
