= Rugby league nines =

9-a-side version of rugby league

- Highest governing body: International Rugby League
- Nicknames: Nines, Football, Footy, League

Characteristics
- Contact: Full
- Team members: 15 (9 on field + 6 interchange)
- Mixed-sex: Single
- Type: Outdoor
- Equipment: Rugby League ball
- Venue: Rugby league playing field

Rugby league nines (or simply nines) is a version of rugby league football played with nine players on each side. The game is substantially the same as full rugby league, with some differences in rules and shorter games. Nines is usually played in festivals, as its shorter game play allows for a tournament to be completed in a day or over a single weekend.

In July 2021, International Rugby League (IRL) chair Troy Grant stated that the organisation was considering a bid for rugby league nines to be played at the 2032 Summer Olympics in Brisbane. Rugby sevens, a similarly-condensed version of rugby union, has been a core Olympic event since 2016.

== Laws ==
The laws of the game are the same as standard rugby league laws with the following exceptions.

- Each team is allowed a squad of up to fifteen players, with no more than nine players on the field at any time. Unlimited substitutions are allowed from a named bench of four players.
- The match lasts for 18 minutes, divided into two halves of 9 minutes. There is no half time interval but teams are allowed a maximum of 1 minute to change ends. Each half starts with a place kick.
- Scrums consist of no more than 5 forwards, with a maximum 3 in the front row and 2 in the second row. When the ball is in the scrum no more than 4 players from each team shall act as backs. The ball must emerge from behind the feet of the second row.
- Conversions after a successful try take the form of drop kicks. Players from the team that has conceded the score do not have to retire behind the try line but must not interfere with any conversion attempt.
- When points have been scored the team against which points have been scored will restart the game with a tap restart from the centre of the half-way line.
- When a team is awarded a penalty then play must proceed by way of a tap 10-metres in advance of where the infringement took place.
- In the event of misconduct by a player the referee can suspend for 5 minutes. In the Carnegie Floodlit Nines, a major nines competition, this has been reduced to 2 minutes.

== Tournaments ==
Global

- Rugby League World Cup 9s (defunct)
- Super League World Nines (defunct)
- Exhibition tournament at the 2018 Commonwealth Games (one-off)

Regional

- Rugby league at the Pacific Games

Professional club tournaments

- NRL Nines (defunct)
- RFL Women's Nines

Other notable tournaments

- Cabramatta International Nines (defunct)
- London 9s (one-off)
- Vegas 9s

== See also ==
- Rugby league sevens
