= Brewery Field =

Stadium in Bridgend, Wales

Electric Brewery Field
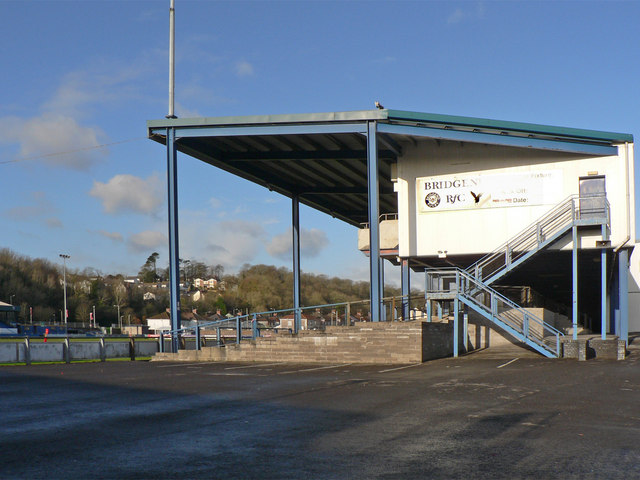
- Interactive map of Electric Brewery Field
- Former names: The Brewery Field; Riverside Hardware Brewery Field (2010–2013); Bridgend Ford Brewery Field (2013–2017); Morganstone Brewery Field (2017–2021); Timbuild Brewery Field (2021–2022); Dunraven Brewery Field (2022–2025)
- Location: Bridgend, Wales
- Coordinates: 51°30′36″N 3°34′54″W
- Owner: Brewery Field Ltd.
- Capacity: 8,000
- Type: Stadium
- Record attendance: 8,159 (Ospreys v. Cardiff Rugby, 1 January 2024, URC)
- Public transit: Bridgend

Construction
- Opened: 1920

Tenants
- Bridgend Ravens (1920–1929, 1935–1949, 1957–present); Bridgend Athletic RFC (2015–present); Bridgend Blue Bulls (2005); Bridgend Town A.F.C. (2009–2013); Celtic Crusaders (2005–2009); Celtic Warriors (2003–2004); Ospreys (2025-2026)

The Brewery Field, currently called The Electric Brewery Field for sponsorship reasons, is an 8,000 (1,100 seated) capacity sports stadium in Bridgend, Wales. It is the home ground of the rugby union team Bridgend Ravens and Bridgend Athletic RFC

== Origins ==
The Brewery Field was purchased by the Bridgend Amateur Athletic Club shortly after World War I for £9,000. The club erected a grandstand and pavilion and created several sports pitches for tennis, hockey, cricket and football. In 1927, the ground was then sold to the Welsh Greyhound Racing Association for £7,000, who wished to conduct greyhound racing on site. However, soon after, the greyhound syndicate went into liquidation and the assets became the property of the bank. The bank sold it to Bridgend Rugby Club, who had acquired a loan from the Welsh Rugby Union to buy it.

== Sports ==
=== Rugby union ===
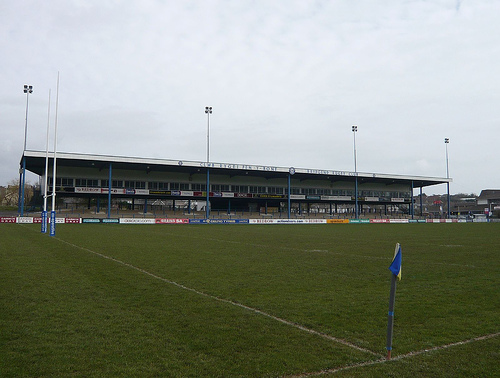
Brewery Field main stand

Bridgend Ravens moved to The Brewery Field in 1920 after their former home, Quarella Ground, was acquired for building purposes. The club's first stay at the Brewery Field ended in the 1928/29 season.

Bridgend RFC returned in 1935, but were forced into exile once more in May 1949, after a rugby league team had signed up to take the lease of the ground. After the council acquired the ground via a compulsory purchase order, Bridgend RFC were set to return in September 1957. The stadium was in a poor state of repair: most of the outside fencing was laid to the ground, essential services including water, heating, lighting and drainage were wrecked and needed to be completely re-installed. Other repairs and building work took place over several months and just in time for the 1957/58 season and the club have remained there ever since.

Celtic Warriors played most of their home matches at the ground in their only season in 2003–04. The team was formed during the advent of regional rugby at the top level of rugby union in Wales and was the partnership of Bridgend RFC and Pontypridd RFC. The ground hosted all but 3 of the club's home games. A then capacity crowd of 10,000 saw the team host London Wasps in the 2003–04 Heineken Cup. The team was culled after just one season due to financial difficulties by the Welsh Rugby Union, neither Bridgend or Pontypridd had any sort of ownership of the region at the time of closure. Following the demise of the Warriors region in June 2004, the Neath-Swansea Ospreys had their borders extended to cover much of the Bridgend and Ogmore areas to the east. However, for logistical reasons it was decided that no home games would be played the Brewery Field.

In 2010, the Ospreys announced that their fixture against the Leicester Tigers in the LV Cup would be played at Brewery Field. After achieving a record crowd for the team in the competition (6,632), the Ospreys continue to use the Brewery Field as a secondary venue. In January 2019, the Ospreys moved their Pro14 game against Ulster to the stadium after a fixture clash at the team's regular home of the Liberty Stadium. Ospreys again used the ground for their 2024 New Year's Day game against Cardiff, as well as in their Challenge Cup Round of 16 match against Sale Sharks.

2010 saw the ground host all of Wales national women's rugby union team home matches in the 2010 Women's Six Nations Championship.

It was announced in August 2015 that Bridgend Athletic RFC will play the majority of their home matches at the Brewery Field.

=== Rugby league ===
Rugby league team Bridgend Blue Bulls played at the ground in 2005, winning all their home games, including the RLC Welsh Grand Final 56-16 against Torfaen Tigers. The ground also hosted the final of the Harry Jepson Trophy, which the club reached and ran out 60-10 winners over Leeds Akkies. The club moved to Porthcawl RFC for the 2006 season.

Crusaders played their first four seasons of their existence at the ground, to which they had ownership of, between 2006 and 2009. The team played in the lower leagues of professional rugby league during their first few years, before they were given a franchise to operate in the Super League, the elite rugby league competition in Europe, from 2009 to 2011. They played their first Super League home game at the stadium on 21 February 2009 against Hull F.C. The Crusaders won their first Super League game at Brewery Field on 13 June 2009 with a shock win against the Wigan Warriors. They re-located to The Racecourse Ground in Wrexham at the end of 2009 and disbanded two years later. It was also the headquarters of Wales Rugby League and home of the Wales national rugby league team, but they have since re-located.

==== Rugby league test matches ====
The list of rugby league internationals played at Brewery Field.

Date	Home	Score	Away	Competition	Attendance
November 2, 2003	Wales	4–76	Australia	2003 Kangaroo tour	3,112
October 16, 2005	Wales	22–14	Scotland	2005 European Nations Cup	1,176
October 29, 2006	Wales	14–21	Scotland	2008 Rugby League World Cup qualifying	2,378
October 28, 2007	Wales	50–10	Papua New Guinea	Friendly^	1,456
October 17, 2009	Wales	12–48	England	Friendly	3,249
November 8, 2009	Wales	28–16	Scotland	2009 European Cup Final	1,608

^ not a full international, as not played to international rules (excess substitutes were used)

=== Football ===
Bridgend Town A.F.C. moved to the Brewery Field in 2009 after the consortium that the club was part of, purchased the ground. The club had been without a home since leaving Coychurch Road in 2007 to make way for a supermarket development. The club initially ground-shared with Porthcawl Town for a year, and then moved to the University of Glamorgan playing fields at the Pontypridd campus. The club played their first game at the Brewery Field in September 2009, when they beat Aberaman Athletic 1-0. In 2013, the club merged with local rivals Bryntirion Athletic to form Penybont F.C. and will be based out of Bryntirion Park. The stadium hosted Penybont F.C.'s first game in European club competition on 13 July 2023, when they participated in the 2023–24 UEFA Europa Conference League first qualifying round. As a result of UEFA requirements, only seated tickets were sold, and 1,400 fans saw Penybont draw 1-1 with FC Santa Coloma of Andorra.

The 2010 FAW Women's Cup Final between Cardiff City Ladies and UWIC Ladies was played on the ground.

International football arrived at the ground for the first time in October 2010, with the venue hosting two games from the 2011 UEFA European Under-19 Football Championship qualification, with Wales hosting their group. The first game was played on 22 October, when Turkey U19s recorded a 5-1 victory over Kazakhstan U19s. The second game at the venue was between Kazakhstan U19s and Wales U19s on 25 October which ended in a 1-1 draw and ensured Wales finished second in the group and qualified for the next stage of the qualification process.

== Other uses ==
The stadium held a Bryan Adams concert in 2006, which was organised by the Celtic Crusaders and was seen as a huge success with over 15,000 in attendance.

== Ownership ==
The ground changed ownership in March 2009. Before this change, the long-term lease was owned by the Crusaders and the Bridgend Ravens had to rent the ground from the Crusaders throughout the winter.

In July 2010, a story was published that many misunderstood to mean Bridgend Ravens had sole ownership of the famous ground. In fact the story was only reporting that Bridgend Ravens had finally purchased their half of the lease for the Brewery Field from Bridgend Town, having not been financially able to at the original transfer of ownership. The ground remained in 50/50 ownership between Bridgend Ravens and Bridgend Town Football Club. August 2014 was a landmark day for the Brewery Field. Bridgend Ravens announced that under a new Management Franchise Licence they would be in full charge of the day-to-day running of the ground.

=== Naming rights ===
In August 2017, Bridgend Ravens announced that the stadium would be renamed the Morganstone Brewery Field on a two-year deal. Morganstone replaced the previous naming rights holders, Bridgend Ford, a local Ford car dealership. A local independent builders merchant, Timbuild, replaced Morganstone in August 2021, becoming the stadium partner on a two-year deal. Dunraven Windows, a home improvement company, became the club's stadium partner in August 2022 on a two-year deal.
