= Old Anniesland =

Rugby ground in Glasgow, Scotland

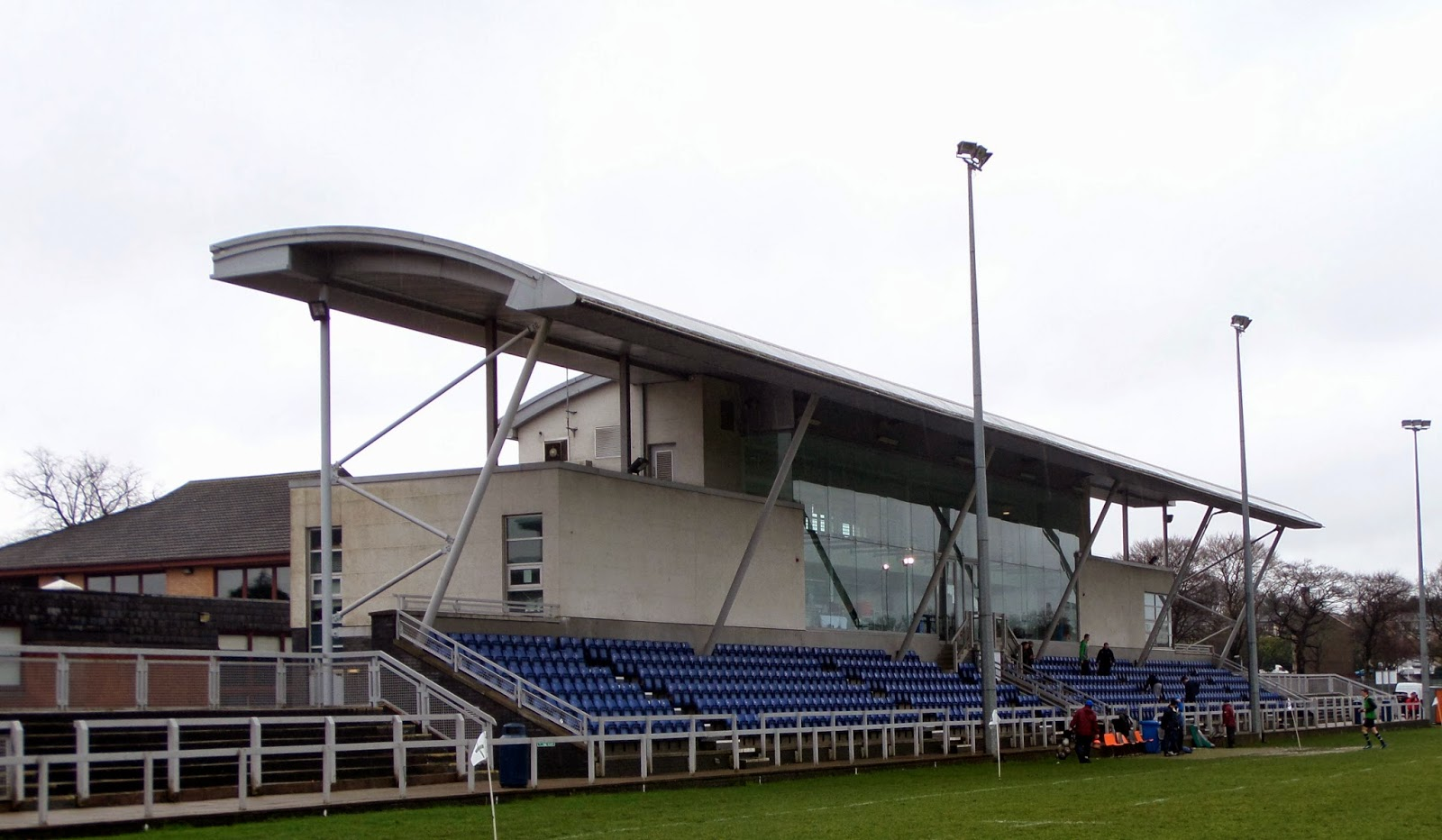
- Old Anniesland grandstand

- Location in Glasgow
- Location: Crow Road, Glasgow G13 1PL
- Coordinates: 55.8875°N 4.3274°W
- Owner: Glasgow Hawks
- Capacity: 3,500

Tenant
- Glasgow High Kelvinside

Old Anniesland is a rugby union ground in Glasgow, Scotland, with a capacity of approximately 3,500..

It is the home of Glasgow Hawks, who currently play in the Scottish Premiership. It is also used by Glasgow High Kelvinside.

== History ==
Originally home to Glasgow Academicals in 1883, the playing fields were bought by Glasgow HSFP in 1919.

== Location ==
It is situated just off Crow Road in Anniesland, in the west of Glasgow.

== Uses ==
Home to Glasgow Hawks, it also hosts matches by Glasgow High Kelvinside. It is sometimes used to host Scotland Club XV matches. It hosted Scotland Rugby League's European Cup match against Wales in 2010.

There is a main pitch for competitive games, and several other rugby pitches for play and training, some floodlit and one with Astroturf. Gym facilities are also available to club members.

Shinty is also played at the venue, with the final of the Glasgow Celtic Society Cup held there in June most years.
