= International rugby league in 2016 =

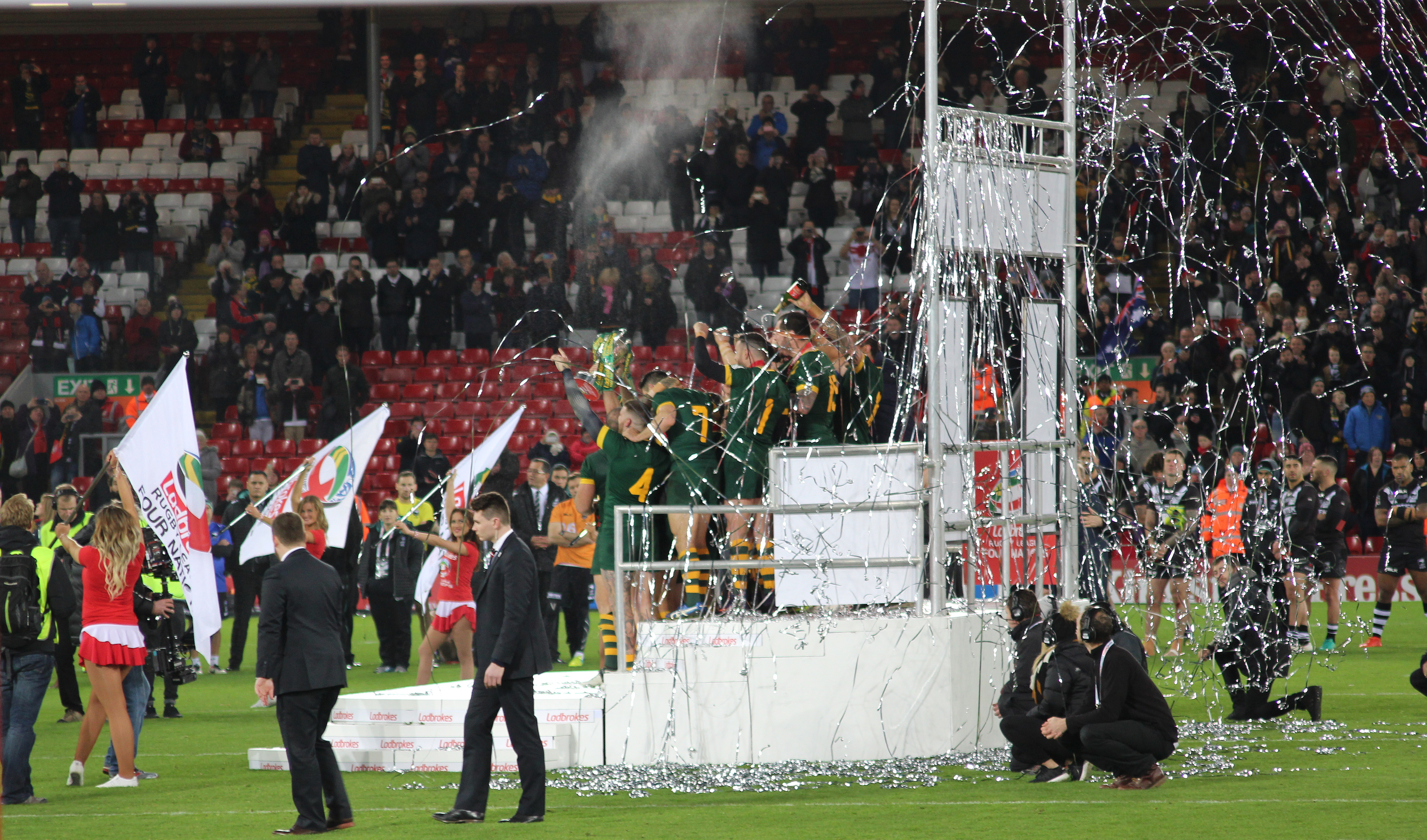
- Australia reclaime their Four Nations title after beating New Zealand in the 2016 final

This is a list of international rugby league matches played throughout 2016. A † denotes a recognised, but unofficial match that did not contribute to the IRL World Rankings.

== February ==
=== Philippines men vs Serbia in Australia ===
5 February 2016
19:30 (AEST)

Philippines	18–12	Serbia
Phillips 1 Goodwin 1 Mason 1 Jones 1 Goals: Stephenson 1/4	1st: 12–4; 2nd: 6–8; Report	Stevanović 2 Vujanović 1 Goals: Vojislav Dedić 0/2; Vukanović 0/1

Cabramatta Leagues Stadium, Sydney
Player of the Match: Luke Srama (Philippines)

FB	1	Trent Swanson
WG	2	Blake Mackey
CE	3	Richie Goodwin
CE	4	Ned Stephenson
WG	5	Michael Mason
FE	6	James Marcus
HB	7	Paul Sheedy
PR	8	Dylan Jones
HK	9	Luke Srama (c)
PR	10	Glenn Powers
SR	11	Rez Phillips (c)
SR	12	Ricky Kucia
LK	13	Steven Bernstrom
Interchange:
BE	14	Tyrone Tootell
BE	15	Elvis Jensen
BE	16	Will Grooms
BE	17	Jeremy Grooms
Coach:
Arwin Marcus

FB	1	Joshua Marjanović
WG	2	Miloš Zogović
CE	3	Miloš Ćalić
CE	4	Stevan Stevanović
WG	17	Džavid Jašari
FE	6	Vojislav Dedić
HB	7	Dalibor Vukanović (c)
PR	8	David Andjelić
HK	9	Vladislav Dedić
PR	10	Stefan Nedeljković
SR	11	George Vujanović
SR	12	Nikola Štrbac
LK	13	Ilija Radan
Interchange:
BE	15	Reece Grkinić
BE	16	Milan Radojević
BE	18	Ilija Čotrić
BE	19	Dejan Lukenić
Coach:
Jason Green

== May ==
=== Women's ANZAC Test ===
6 May 2016
5.25pm (AEST)

Australia	16 – 26	New Zealand
Tries: Brown (50', 78') 2 Bremner (24') 1 Goals: Studdon 1 (pen); Moran 1 (con)		Tries: Tupaea 2 (11', 17'); Fiso 2 (45', 64'); Feterika 1 (33'); Rota 1 (68'); Goals: Maaka 1 (con)

Hunter Stadium, Newcastle
Referee: (Australia) Adam Cassidy

=== ANZAC Test ===
6 May 2016
8.05pm (AEST)

Australia	16–0	New Zealand
Tries: Boyd (14') 1 Inglis (32') 1 Ferguson (80') 1 Goals: Thurston 1/3 (20' pen); Smith 1/2 (44' pen); Sin Bin: Radradra 1 (6')

Hunter Stadium, Newcastle
Attendance: 27,724
Referee: (Australia) Gerard Sutton
Player of the Match: Paul Gallen

Notes:

- This was the annual 2016 Anzac Test.
- Australia's win ended a 3-match losing streak against New Zealand.
- This was the first time New Zealand were held scoreless in a test-match since 2007.
- With the victory, Australia reclaim the Bill Kelly Memorial Trophy.
- Martin Taupau and Sam Moa made their 10th test appearance for New Zealand.
- Blake Ferguson, Josh McGuire, Michael Morgan and Fijian-born Semi Radradra made their international debuts for Australia while Dallin Watene-Zelezniak, Kenny Bromwich and Manu Maʻu made their international debuts for New Zealand.

=== Melanesian Cup ===
The 2016 Melanesian Cup was played between Papua New Guinea and Fiji. Papua New Guinea created history to win their first Melanesian Cup title. The test looked in a similar situation to last year when Fiji took a comfortable lead into the break but this time around Papua New Guinea scored enough points in the second half to outscore their pacific rivals and win their first major title since the 2009 Pacific Cup. Captain David Mead shone for the Kumuls as he made try-saving tackles, assists and even line breaks in a man-of-the-match performance which was a crucial influence to earning his country's first win on away soil since the year 2000. Fiji picked 7 débutantes for the test match, while PNG featured five players making their first ever International appearance for their country. Both teams had a fair share of NRL, Queensland or New South Wales Cup, as well as domestic club players. Papua New Guinea's most capped player was Rod Griffin who made his 10th appearance for his country, while Fiji's most experienced player was Akuila Uate who made his 12th appearance for his country. Gold Coast's David Mead captained Papua New Guinea, and Port Kembla Blacks' James Storer led Fiji.

7 May 2016
5.45pm (AEST)

Papua New Guinea	24–22	Fiji
Tries: W Boas (5'), (52') 2 Ottio (42') 1 McDonald (71') 1 Goals: A Boas 4/5 (6'), (8' pen), (44'), (72'); Sin Bin: Olam 1 (yellow card) 37' to 47'	Report	Tries: Vunakece 1 (16'); Qionimacawa 3 (29') (37') (75'); Goals: Kennedy 1/1 (17'); Moceidreke 2/4 (22' pen), (76')

Pirtek Stadium, Parramatta
Attendance: 15,225
Referee: Robert Hicks (England)

FB	1	David Mead (c)
RW	2	Justin Olam
RC	3	Kato Ottio
LC	4	Nene McDonald
LW	5	Stargroth Amean
SO	6	Ase Boas
SH	7	Watson Boas
PR	8	Luke Page
HK	9	Wartovo Puara
PR	10	Henry Wan
SR	11	Rhyse Martin
SR	12	Rod Griffin
LF	13	Adam Korave
Substitutions:
IC	14	Adex Wera
IC	15	Brandy Peter
IC	16	Willie Minoga
IC	17	Kurt Baptiste
Coach:
(Papua New Guinea) Michael Marum

FB	1	Tyrone Phillips
RW	2	Akuila Uate
RC	3	Sisa Waqa
LC	4	Brayden Wiliame
LW	5	Etuate Qionimacawa
SO	6	Sitiveni Moceidreke
SH	7	Maurice Kennedy
PR	8	Kane Evans
HK	9	James Storer (c)
PR	10	Daniel Saifiti
SR	11	Junior Roqica
SR	12	Fabian Goodall
LF	13	Eloni Vunakece
Substitutions:
IC	14	Ben Nakubuwai
IC	15	Tui Kamikamica
IC	16	Tevita Cottrell
IC	17	Jokatama Dokonivalu
Coach:
(Australia) Mick Potter

Notes:

- This was the first of the two 2016 Pacific Rugby League Tests.
- The win was Papua New Guinea's first win on foreign soil since the 2000 World Cup.
- With the victory, Papua New Guinea now hold the Melanesian Cup shield.
- Rod Griffin made his 10th test appearance for Papua New Guinea.
- James Storer made his 10th test appearance for Fiji.
- Justin Olam, Stargroth Amean, Watson Boas, Henry Wan and Kurt Baptiste made their international debuts for Papua New Guinea while Etuate Qionimacawa, Sitiveni Moceidreke, Maurice Kennedy, Ben Nakubuwai, Tui Kamikamica, Tevita Cottrell and Jokatama Dokonivalu made their international debuts for Fiji.

=== Polynesian Cup ===
The 2016 Polynesian Cup was played between Samoa and Tonga. Samoa defeated Tonga to win their second consecutive Polynesian Cup title. The strong crowd would always show their passion and loud screaming support throughout the game after big hits, strong runs and intense moments were key talking points. However a total of 29 errors and a completion rate of just over 50% from both countries was a headache for everyone to watch. Despite Tonga having 55% possession and more territory, they didn't score and the Samoans made them pay by taking their few second-half opportunities that were given to them resulting in another Samoan victory over their old 'War rivals'. Samoa picked 7 débutantes for the test match, while Tonga featured three. Both teams' players varied from National Rugby League players to Queensland or New South Wales Cup to Holden Cup and to the Super League. Samoa's most capped player was Leeson Ah Mau who made his 10th appearance for his country, while Tonga's most experienced player was Feleti Mateo who made his 13th appearance for his country. English Super League club Hull F.C. gave permission for two players to leave England and play in the Polynesian Cup test; coincidentally they were captain of both nations. Frank Pritchard captained Samoa, and Sika Manu led Tonga.

7 May 2016
7.45pm (AEST)

Samoa	18–6	Tonga
Tries: Winterstein (15') 1 Leutele (55') 1 Wright (75') 1 Goals: Brown 3/4 (16'), (40' pen), (56')	Report	Tries: Pangai 1 (4'); Goals: Kata 1/1 (5')

Pirtek Stadium, Parramatta
Attendance: 15,225
Referee: (Australia) Ben Cummins

FB	1	Tim Simona
RW	2	Antonio Winterstein
RC	4	Ricky Leutele
LC	3	Kirisome Auva'a
LW	5	Matthew Wright
SO	6	Fa'amanu Brown
SH	7	Pita Godinet
PR	8	Sam Kasiano
HK	9	Kaysa Pritchard
PR	10	Junior Paulo
SR	11	Leeson Ah Mau
SR	12	Frank Pritchard (c)
LF	13	Sauaso Sue
Substitutions:
IC	14	Erin Clark
IC	15	John Asiata
IC	16	Raymond Faitala-Mariner
IC	17	Sam Tagataese
Coach:
(Australia) Matt Parish

FB	1	David Fusitua
RW	2	Mosese Pangai
RC	3	Solomone Kata
LC	4	Vai Toutai
LW	5	Michael Oldfield
SO	6	Feleti Mateo
SH	7	Samisoni Langi
PR	8	Peni Terepo
HK	9	Sione Katoa
PR	10	Felise Kaufusi
SR	11	Sika Manu (c)
SR	12	Tony Williams
LF	13	Joe Ofahengaue
Substitutions:
IC	14	Nafe Seluini
IC	15	David Fifita
IC	16	Siosaia Vave
IC	17	Patrick Kaufusi
Coach:
(Australia) Kristian Woolf

Notes:

- This was the second of the two 2016 Pacific Rugby League Tests.
- With the victory, Samoa retain the Polynesian Cup shield.
- Leeson Ah Mau made his 10th test appearance for Samoa.
- Kirisome Auva'a, Fa'amanu Brown, Erin Clark, Junior Paulo, Kaysa Pritchard, Raymond Faitala-Mariner and John Asiata made their international debuts for Samoa while David Fusitu'a, Patrick Kaufusi and Sione Katoa made their international debuts for Tonga.

=== Lebanon men vs Cook Islands in Australia ===
8 May 2016

Lebanon	20–30	Cook Islands
Tries: el Zbadieh 2 Barakat 1 Kassis 1 Goals: Miskie 2/5	Report	Tries: Peni 2 Makatoa 1 Glassie 1 Ngaro 1 Goals: Tangiiti 5/6

Belmore Sports Ground, Belmore

== June ==
=== Chile men vs El Salvador in Australia ===
11 June 2016

Chile	58–20	El Salvador
	Report

Henson Park, Marrickville

Notes

- This was the first ever 13-aside match both teams ever played as they regularly play 9-aside matches against each other and fellow Latin Heat-based nations.

=== Italy men vs Lebanon ===
11 June 2016

Italy	22–26	Lebanon
Tries: Diac (31'), (35'), (77') 3 Arrigo (46'), (51') 2 Goals: Arrigo 0/2; Dodi 1/2; Giorgis 0/1	Report	Tries: Sabat 3 (4'), (14'), (64'); Zeidan 1 (10'); Finan 1 (24'); Goals: Hachem 3/6

Catania University Stadium, Catania

Notes:

- This was the first Mediterranean Cup since 2004.
- Both nations fielded a total of 12 debutants each.

=== European Championship C ===
25 June 2016

Ukraine	46–6	Czech Republic
Tries: Skorbach (4'), (77') 2 Shalaiev (9'), (13'), (68'), (72') 4 Khrusiuk (22') 1 Troiyan (40') 1 Shakura (64') 1 Goals: Skorbach 0/3; Shakura 5/6	Report	Tries: Friedl 1 (18'); Goals: Šedina 1/1

Avanhard Stadium, Rivne
Attendance: 1,500
Referee: (Greece) George Stilianos

8 October 2016
19:00

Czech Republic	12–64	Ukraine
	Report

Havlichkuv Brod, Vrchlabi
Attendance: 250

Notes:

- Ukraine win 2016 Rugby League European Championship C

== July ==
=== Sweden men vs Norway ===
16 July 2016

Sweden	24 – 40	Norway
Tries: Ah-Lam (22') 1 Cammell (31') 1 Teodor Loxvi (48') 1 Wikander (69') 1 Goals: Jönsson 4/4	Report	Tries: Mwikaria 2 (5'), (9'); Schmidt 1 (27'); Flage 1 (35'); Mellor 2 (54'), (75'); Mikalsen 2 (58'), (79'); Goals: Hachem 4/8

Årsta, Stockholm

Notes:

- This was a part of the 2016 Nordic Cup.
- This was the first time ever that the Nordic Cup only featured two countries, after Denmark withdrew from the tournament.
- It was Norway's first Nordic Cup win since 2012.

=== America's Cup ===
16 July 2016

Jamaica	2 – 38	Canada
Tries: Goals: Myers 1/1	Report	Tries: McCarthy 1 Legault 1 Boyd 1 Grace 1 Miller 1 Hergott 1 Schouten 1 Goals: Kelly 5/5; Felix 0/1; Gemmell 0/1

Levitown, Pennsylvania
Referee: (United States) Vince Lawson

23 July 2016

United States	54 – 4	Jamaica
Tries: Taylor Alley 3 Mike Timpano 2 Taioalo Vaivai 1 Gabe Farley 1 Barthlemey Longchamp 1 Nick Newlin 1 CJ Cortalano 1 Goals: Mike Timpano 6/9; Taioalo Vaivai 1/1	Report	Tries: Ronaldo Wade 1

A. A. Garthwaite Stadium, Conshohocken

Notes:

- Former NRL player, Taioalo 'Junior' Vaivai, made his International debut for the United States.

24 September 2016

Canada	8 – 14	United States
	Report

Lamport Stadium, Toronto

Notes:

- Also played as part of the Colonial Cup.

== August ==
=== European Triangular Series ===
6 August 2016

Germany	12–26	Belgium
Tries: Amefia 2 Goals: Keinhorst 2/2	Report	Tries: Leclerq 2 Bertrand 1 Troquereau 1 Guimard 1 Goals: Leroyer 3/5

Mendesportanlage, Dortmund

13 August 2016

Netherlands	6 – 8	Germany
Tries: Werk (8') 1 Goals: Storm 2/2	Report	Tries: Hagenah (13') 1 Ziekursch (22') 1 Goals: Seelweger 0/2

Rotterdamse Rugby Club, Rotterdam

Notes

- With the win, Germany retained the Griffin Cup.

3 September 2016

Belgium	36–12	Netherlands
	Report

Neder-Over-Heembeek, Brussels

=== Fiji men vs Canada in the United States ===
20 August 2016

Fiji	26 – 12	Canada
	Report

Aloha Stadium, Honolulu

Notes:

- This was a part of the 2016 Ohana Cup.

== September ==
=== Czech Republic men vs Norway ===
24 September 2016
4:00pm (UTC+1)

Czech Republic	12 – 6	Norway
Tries: Šedina (35') 1 Fanda (52') 1 Hovard (68') 1 Goals: Šedina 0/2; Bžoch 0/1	Report	Tries: Jørgensen (25') 1 Goals: Mwikaria 1/1

RLC Dragons Krupka Stadium, Teplice

=== Spain men vs Serbia ===
24 September 2016
5:00pm (GMT+2)

Spain	6–64	Serbia
	Report

Polideportivo Quatre Carreres, Valencia

== October ==
=== United States men vs Canada ===
1 October 2016
7:00pm (UTC–5)

United States	20–14	Canada
	Report

Eden Park, Wilmington

=== World Cup European qualifiers ===
15 October 2016
3:00pm (UTC+3)

Russia
Try: Burlutskii 12'
Zagoskin 14'
Kosharin 33'
Lysokon 44'
Bratko 54'
Chuprin 76'
Buryak 79'

Goal: Lysokon 4/5
Bratko 1/1
Burlutskii 1/1

40–6
Report

Spain
Try: Rango 69'
Goal: Garcia 1/1

Fili Stadium, Moscow
Attendance: 427
Referee: (England) Jack Smith
Player of the Match: (Russia) Aleksandr Lysokon

FB	1	Nikolay Zagoskin
RW	5	Vadim Buryak
RC	21	Kirill Kosharin
LC	3	Leonid Kalinin
LW	18	Dmitry Bratko
SO	6	Aleksandr Lysokon
SH	7	Denis Tiulenev
PR	8	Sergei Konstantinov (c)
HK	4	Petr Botnarash
PR	10	Ivan Troitskii
SR	12	Mikhail Burlutskii
SR	11	Andrey Kuznetsov
LF	13	Viacheslav Eremin
Substitutes:
IC	17	Igor Chuprin
IC	2	Maksim Suchkov
IC	9	Vladimir Vlasyuk
IC	15	Sergey Gaponov
Coach:
Denis Korolev

FB	1	Daniel Garcia
RW	2	Clement Laguerre
RC	3	Antonio Puerta
LC	4	Alexandre Doutres
LW	5	Chris Lopez
FE	6	Ivan Ordaz
HB	7	Miguel Charters-Blanco
PR	8	Luis Thorp
HK	9	Gonzalo Morro
PR	10	Adria Alonso
SR	11	Cedric Bringuier
SR	12	Matt Dulley
LK	13	Aitor Davila (c)
Substitutes:
IC	14	Andrew Pilkington
IC	15	Leandre Torres
IC	16	Kevin Aparicio
IC	17	Juan Pablo Rango
Coach:
Darren Fisher

15 October 2016
3:00pm (GMT)

Wales	50–0	Serbia
Try: Williams (2) 12', 19; Grace (2) 28', 56; Olds (2) 33', 69'; Davies 46'; Gay 52'; Dudson 76; Goal: White 4/6; Davies 3/3	Report	Try:

Parc Stebonheath, Llanelli
Attendance: 902
Referee: (England) Chris Campbell
Player of the Match: (Wales) Elliot Kear

FB	1	Elliot Kear
RW	2	Regan Grace
RC	4	Christiaan Roets
LC	18	Andrew Gay
LW	5	Rhys Williams
SO	6	Courtney Davies
SH	7	Ollie Olds
PR	8	Gil Dudson
HK	9	Lloyd White
PR	10	Craig Kopczak (c)
SR	11	Rhodri Lloyd
SR	15	Joe Burke
LF	13	Philip Joseph
Substitutes:
IC	14	Steve Parry
IC	16	Jacob Emmitt
IC	17	Anthony Walker
IC	19	Matty Fozard
Coach:
John Kear

FB	1	Vojislav Dedić
RW	2	Joshua Marjanović
RC	3	Miloš Ćalić
LC	4	Stevan Stevanović
LW	5	Pero Madžarević (yellow card) 54' to 64'
FE	6	Daniel Burke
HB	7	Dalibor Vukanović (c)
PR	8	David Andjelić
HK	9	Vladislav Dedić
PR	10	Jordan Grant
SR	11	Chad Grant
SR	12	Jason Muranka
LK	13	Stefan Nedeljković
Substitutes:
IC	14	Ilija Radan
IC	15	James Mirceski
IC	16	Reece Grkinić
IC	17	Džavid Jašari
Coach:
Ljubomir Bukvic

22 October 2016

Serbia	14–62	Italy
Try: Marjanović (2) 68', 79'; Burke 73'; Goal: Dedić 1/2	Report	Try: Lepori (4) 4', 10', 12', 46'; Cerruto (4) 17', 35', 49', 71'; Wakeman 22'; Santi 45'; Campese 58'; Calegari 62'; Goal: Bergamasco 7/11; Campese 0/1

Makiš Stadium, Belgrade
Attendance: 1,037
Player of the Match: (Italy) Terry Campese

FB	1	Vojislav Dedić
RW	2	Miloš Zogović
RC	3	Miloš Ćalić
LC	4	Stevan Stevanović
LW	5	Joshua Marjanović
FE	6	Daniel Burke
HB	7	Dalibor Vukanović (c)
PR	8	Ilija Radan
HK	9	Reece Grkinić
PR	10	Jordan Grant
SR	11	James Mirceski
SR	12	Jason Muranka
LK	13	Chad Grant
Substitutes:
IC	14	David Andjelić
IC	15	Miodrag Tomić
IC	16	Vlado Kušić
IC	17	Vladislav Dedić
Coach:
Ljubomir Bukvic

FB	1	Mason Cerruto
RW	2	Chris Centrone
RC	3	Justin Castellaro
LC	4	Mirco Bergamasco
LW	5	Richard Lepori
FE	6	Terry Campese
HB	7	Ryan Ghietti
PR	8	Shannon Wakeman
HK	9	Dean Parata
PR	10	Gavin Hiscox
SR	11	Jayden Walker
SR	12	Brenden Santi
LK	13	Joel Riethmuller
Substitutes:
IC	14	Col Wilkie
IC	15	Christophe Calegari
IC	16	Kieran Quabba
IC	17	Gioele Celerino
Coach:
Cameron Ciraldo

29 October 2016
3:30pm (CET)

Italy	14–20	Wales
Try: Wilkie 26'; Castellaro 29'; Goal: Campese 3/3	Report	Try: Morris (2) 16', 59'; Walker 37'; Gay 52'; Goal: Davies 2/4

Stadio Brianteo, Monza
Attendance: 839
Referee: (England) Chris Campbell

FB	2	Chris Centrone
RW	3	Justin Castellaro
RC	15	Christophe Calegari
LC	4	Mirco Bergamasco
LW	5	Richard Lepori
FE	6	Terry Campese
HB	7	Ryan Ghietti
PR	8	Shannon Wakeman
HK	9	Dean Parata
PR	10	Gavin Hiscox
SR	11	Jayden Walker
SR	12	Brenden Santi
LK	13	Joel Riethmuller
Substitutes:
IC	1	Mason Cerruto
IC	14	Col Wilkie
IC	16	Kieran Quabba
IC	17	Gioele Celerino
Coach:
Cameron Ciraldo

FB	1	Elliot Kear
RW	2	Rhys Williams
RC	26	Ben Morris
LC	16	Andrew Gay
LW	3	Dai Evans
SO	6	Courtney Davies
SH	17	Matty Fozard
PR	8	Gil Dudson
HK	9	Lloyd White
PR	10	Craig Kopczak (c)
SR	11	Rhodri Lloyd
SR	12	Philip Joseph
LF	13	Steve Parry
Substitutes:
IC	14	Joe Burke
IC	15	Anthony Walker
IC	23	Sam Hopkins
IC	24	Danny Ansell
Coach:
John Kear

22 October 2016
1:00pm (GMT+2)

Spain	6–46	Ireland
Try: Charters-Blanco 62'; Goal: Garcia 1/1	Report	Try: Roberts 2'; Dunne (2) 5', 52'; Littler (2) 29', 74'; Hasson 39'; Peacock 56'; King 66'; Grix 77'; Goal: Finn 5/9

Polideportivo Quatre Carreres, Valencia
Attendance: 323
Referee: (France) Patrice Benausse
Player of the Match: (Ireland) Liam Finn

FB	1	Daniel Garcia
RW	2	Clement Laguerre
RC	3	Antonio Puerta
LC	4	Alexandre Doutres
LW	5	Chris Lopez
FE	6	Ivan Ordaz
HB	7	Miguel Charters-Blanco
PR	8	Luis Thorp
HK	9	Nicolas Munoz
PR	10	Joel Marquez-Laynez
SR	11	Leandre Torres
SR	12	Cedric Bringuier (yellow card) 65' to 75'
LK	13	Kevin Aparicio
Substitutes:
IC	14	Andrew Pilkington
IC	15	Aitor Davila
IC	16	Matt Dulley
IC	17	Adria Alonso
Coach:
Darren Fisher

FB	1	Shannon McDonnell
RW	2	Casey Dunne
RC	3	Stuart Littler
LC	4	Oliver Roberts
LW	5	Alan McMahon
FE	6	Scott Grix
HB	7	Liam Finn (c)
PR	8	James Hasson
HK	9	Joseph Keyes
PR	10	Luke Ambler
SR	11	David Allen
SR	12	Will Hope
LK	13	George King
Substitutes:
IC	14	Haydn Peacock
IC	15	Matty Hadden
IC	16	James Kelly
IC	17	Gareth Gill
Coach:
Mark Aston

=== Japan men vs Greece ===
8 October 2016
6:40pm (UTC+9)

Japan	0–72	Greece

Katsushika City Sogo Sports Centre, Katsushika

=== Samoa men vs Fiji ===
8 October 2016

Samoa	18–20	Fiji
Tries: Kasiano 4'; Maumalo 16', 20' Goals: Wright (3/3) 5', 18', 21'		Tries: Montoya 24'; Storer 30'; Wiliame 38'; Philips 60'; Goals: Moceidreke (2/4) 32', 40'

Apia Park, Apia
Referee: (Australia) Gerard Sutton

The match was in celebration of the 30th anniversary of rugby league in Samoa. In support of the match, John Grant, the Chief Executive of the Australian Rugby League Commission, provided an Australian registered referee along with senior staff and management to help with the organisation of the match.

=== Australia men vs New Zealand ===
15 October 2016
7:00pm (AWST)

Australia	26–6	New Zealand

nib Stadium, Perth

=== Solomon Islands men in Vanuatu ===
15 October 2016

Vanuatu	24–15	Solomon Islands
	Report

Port Vila Municipal Stadium, Port Vila

=== Wales men vs Jamaica in England ===
21 October 2016

Wales	16 – 16	Jamaica
Tries: Lloyd, Davies, White	Report	Tries: Jones-Bishop (3)

Belle Vue, Wakefield
Attendance: 1,378

=== France men vs England ===
22 October 2016
6.30pm (CET)

France	6–40	England
	Report

Parc des Sports, Avignon

=== Thailand men vs Malta ===
29 October 2016

Thailand	Cancelled	Malta

Princes Royal College Stadium, Chiang Mai

Notes:

- Cancelled due to Thailand entering a year-long period of mourning upon the death of King Bhumibol Adulyadej.

=== South Africa men vs Niue series ===
29 October 2016

South Africa	22–50	Niue
	Report

Brakpan Stadium, Pretoria

2 November 2016

South Africa	0–44	Niue
	Report

Brakpan Stadium, Pretoria

Notes:

- This was initially announced as a triangular series that also included Lebanon but following their withdrawal it was changed to a two match series between South Africa and Niue.

=== Four Nations ===
28 October 2016
8:00pm (GMT)

Australia	54–12	Scotland

KC Lightstream Stadium, Hull

29 October 2016
2:30pm (GMT)

England	16–17	New Zealand

John Smith's Stadium, Huddersfield

5 November 2016
5:30pm (GMT)

England	38–12	Scotland

Ricoh Arena, Coventry

5 November 2016
8:00pm (GMT)

New Zealand	8–14	Australia

Ricoh Arena, Coventry

11 November 2016
8:00pm (GMT)

New Zealand	v	Scotland

The Zebra Claims Stadium, Workington

13 November 2016
2:00pm (GMT)

England	v	Australia

Queen Elizabeth Olympic Park Stadium, London

Sunday, 20 November
2:30pm (BST)

Australia	34–8	New Zealand
Tries: Dugan (10', 24') 2 Ferguson (3') 1 Merrin (21') 1 D Boyd (45') 1 Cordner (74') 1 Goals: 5/8 Thurston (4', 18' pen, 22', 29' pen, 75')	1st: 24 – 0; 2nd: 10 – 8 Report	Tries: 2 (56', 69') Kahu; Goals:

Anfield, Liverpool
Attendance: 40,042
Referee: (Australia) Ben Cummins
Player of the Match: Darius Boyd

FB	1	Darius Boyd
RW	2	Blake Ferguson
RC	3	Greg Inglis
LC	4	Josh Dugan
LW	5	Valentine Holmes
FE	6	Johnathan Thurston
HB	7	Cooper Cronk
PR	8	Matt Scott
HK	9	Cameron Smith (c)
PR	10	Aaron Woods
SR	11	Boyd Cordner
SR	12	Matt Gillett
LK	13	Trent Merrin
Interchange:
IC	14	Michael Morgan
IC	15	David Klemmer
IC	16	Tyson Frizell
IC	17	Shannon Boyd
Coach:
(Australia) Mal Meninga

FB	1	Jordan Kahu
RW	2	David Fusitu'a
RC	3	Solomone Kata
LC	4	Shaun Kenny-Dowall
LW	5	Jordan Rapana
FE	6	Tohu Harris
HB	7	Shaun Johnson
PR	8	Jesse Bromwich (c)
HK	9	Issac Luke
PR	10	Adam Blair
SR	11	Kevin Proctor
SR	12	Manu Ma'u
LK	13	Jason Taumalolo
Interchange:
IC	14	Lewis Brown
IC	15	Martin Taupau
IC	16	Greg Eastwood
IC	17	Joseph Tapine
Coach:
(New Zealand) David Kidwell

== November ==
=== World Cup European play-off qualifier ===
4 November 2016

Italy	76–0	Russia
Tries: Goals:	Report	Tries: Goals:

Leigh Sports Village, Leigh, England
Attendance: 450
Referee: (England) Chris Campbell
Player of the Match: (Italy) Terry Campese

FB	1	Mason Cerruto
RW	2	Chris Centrone
RC	3	Christophe Calegari
LC	4	Col Wilkie
LW	5	Richard Lepori
FE	6	Terry Campese (c)
HB	7	Ryan Ghietti
PR	8	Shannon Wakeman
HK	9	Dean Parata
PR	10	Gavin Hiscox
SR	11	Jayden Walker
SR	12	Brenden Santi
LK	13	Joel Riethmuller
Substitutes:
IC	14	Joseph Tramontana
IC	15	Ryan Tramonte
IC	16	Guiseppe Pagani
IC	17	Gioele Celerino
Coach:
Cameron Ciraldo

FB	2	Maksim Suchkov
RW	5	Vadim Buryak
RC	1	Nikolay Zagoskin
LC	3	Leonid Kalinin
LW	14	Vadim Tsynkovich
SO	6	Aleksandr Lysokon
SH	7	Denis Tiulenev
PR	16	Vadim Fedchuk
HK	9	Vladimir Vlasyuk
PR	10	Ivan Troitskii
SR	12	Mikhail Burlutskii
SR	11	Andrey Kuznetsov
LF	13	Viacheslav Eremin
Substitutes:
IC	17	Igor Chuprin
IC	18	Dmitry Bratko
IC	8	Sergei Konstantinov
IC	4	Petr Botnarash
Coach:
Denis Korolev

With the win Italy became the 14th, and final, team to qualify for the 2017 World Cup.
