= 2017 Rugby League World Cup qualification – Europe =

The 2017 Rugby League World Cup European qualification tournament was a rugby league tournament held in October and November 2016 to decide the three European qualifiers for the 2017 Rugby League World Cup.

It consisted of a round-robin tournament which saw Wales and Ireland qualify by winning their respective tables. Italy claimed the final qualifying spot in the World Cup after winning a second place play-off against Russia on 4 November 2016.

== Background ==
On 3 October 2014, the 2017 Rugby League World Cup qualifying competition was announced. Three European teams were granted automatic qualification, as they had reached the quarter-finals of the 2013 Rugby League World Cup; England, France and Scotland.

Ten teams were able to qualify for the qualification tournament, with the first being eliminated when Spain defeated Latvia on 9 May 2015.

Wales and Ireland were granted entry to the qualification tournament. Both teams already had a chance to qualify for the World Cup during the 2014 European Cup, but failed to do so. One of the other tournament places was allocated to the winner of the European Championship C tournament, and the other three were allocated to the top three teams from the European Championship B.

Italy, Russia and Serbia finished as the top three teams in the European Championship B, with Ukraine being eliminated.

Spain finished as the top team in the European Championship C, with Greece and Malta eliminated.

== Teams ==
Qualified teams for final phase:

- Wales were granted automatic entry as 1st seed
- Ireland were granted automatic entry as 2nd seed
- Serbia qualified as 3rd seed after finishing top of the Rugby League European Championship B.
- Russia qualified as 4th seed after finishing 2nd in the Rugby League European Championship B.
- Italy qualified as 5th seed after finishing 3rd in the Rugby League European Championship B.
- Spain qualified as 6th seed after finishing top of the Rugby League European Championship C.

=== Squads ===
==== Ireland ====
The final Ireland 22-man squad as of 9 October 2016 is as follows:

- Coach: (England) Mark Aston

| Club Team | Players |
|---|---|
| (Ireland) Athboy Longhorns | Casey Dunne |
| (Ireland) Ballynahinch Rabbitohs | Gareth Gill |
| (Ireland) Belfast Met Scholars | Chris Hall |
| (England) Bradford Bulls | Joseph Keyes |
| (Ireland) Dublin City Exiles | James Kelly, Mikey Russell |
| (Ireland) Galway Tribesmen | Alan McMahon |
| (England) Halifax | Luke Ambler |
| (England) Huddersfield Giants | Scott Grix, Oliver Roberts |
| Ireland Students | Matthew Cahoon |
| (England) Leigh Centurions | Greg McNally |
| (England) Oldham R.L.F.C. | Will Hope |
| (Australia) Parramatta Eels | James Hasson |
| (Australia) Redcliffe Dolphins | Danny Bridge |
| (England) Rochdale Hornets | Matty Hadden |
| (England) St. Helens | Shannon McDonnell |
| (England) Wakefield Trinity Wildcats | Liam Finn |
| (England) Warrington Wolves | George King, Toby King, Joe Philbin |
| (England) Whitehaven | David Allen |

==== Italy ====
The final Italy 22-man squad as of 8 October 2016 is as follows:

- Coach: (Australia) Cameron Ciraldo

| Club Team | Players |
|---|---|
| (Australia) Blacktown Workers | Dean Parata |
| (Italy) Brianza Tigers | Patrik Ziliotti |
| (Australia) Cairns Brothers | Joel Riethmuller |
| (Australia) Canterbury Bulldogs | Joseph Tramontana |
| (Australia) Cronulla Sharks | Jayden Walker |
| (England) Hull Kingston Rovers | Terry Campese, Josh Mantellato |
| (France) Lézignan Corbieres | Christophe Calegari |
| (Italy) Lions Brescia | Giuseppe Pagani |
| (Australia) Mackay Cutters | Gavin Hiscox |
| (England) Newcastle Thunder | Gioele Celerino |
| (Australia) Northern Pride | Justin Castellaro, Ryan Ghietti, Colin Wilkie |
| (Australia) North Queensland Cowboys | Kieran Quabba |
| (England) Oldham R.L.F.C. | Richard Lepori |
| (United States) *Sacramento Express | Mirco Bergamasco |
| (Australia) St. George Illawarra Dragons | Shannon Wakeman |
| South Wales Ironmen | Chris Vitalini |
| (Australia) Townsville Blackhawks | Brenden Santi |
| (Australia) Windsor Wolves | Ryan Tramonte |
| (Australia) Wyong Roos | Chris Centrone |

- * Denotes a rugby union club.

==== Russia ====
The final Russia 22-man squad as of 6 September 2016 is as follows:

- Coach: (Russia) Denis Korolev

| Club Team | Players |
|---|---|
| (Russia) CSKA Moscow | Kirill Kosharin |
| (Russia) Dinamo | Viacheslav Eremin, Andrey Kuznetsov |
| (Russia) *Ivanovo White Sharks | Ivan Troitskii |
| (Russia) RC Lokomotiv Moscow | Vadim Buryak, Leonid Kalinin, Maxim Tsinkovich |
| (Russia) Nara | Petr Botnarash, Mikhail Burlutskii, Sergey Gaponov, Anatoly Grigorev, Sergei Konstantinov, Aleksandr Lysokon, Maksim Suchkov, Denis Tiulenev, Vladimir Vlasyuk, Nikolay Zagoskin |
| (Russia) Moscow Fili | Anton Iunisov, Iustin Petrushka |
| (Russia) Moscow Storm | Dmitry Bratko, Igor Chuprin, Vadim Fedchuk |

- * Denotes a rugby union club.

==== Serbia ====
The final 22-man squad as of 5 October 2016 is as follows:

- Coach: (Serbia) Ljubomir Bukvic

| Club Team | Players |
|---|---|
| (Australia) Blacktown Workers | David Andjelić |
| (Australia) Cabramatta Two Blues | Reece Grkinić |
| (Australia) Collegians | Daniel Burke |
| (England) Dewsbury Rams | Jason Muranka |
| (Serbia) Dorćol Spiders | Dalibor Samardžić, Dalibor Vukanović, Stefan Nedeljković, Stevan Stevanović |
| (Australia) Kawana Dolphins | Joshua Marjanović |
| (Serbia) RLK Partizan Belgrade | Džavid Jašari, Vlado Kušić |
| (Serbia) RLK Radnički Nova Pazova | Pero Madžarević, Žarko Kovačević |
| (Serbia) RLK Red Star Belgrade | Miloš Ćalić, Miloš Zogović, Vladislav Dedić, Vojislav Dedić |
| (Australia) St Clair Comets | Chad Grant |
| (France) Villeneuve Leopards | Vladica Nikolić |
| (Australia) Western Suburbs Magpies | James Mirceski |
| (Australia) Wests Tigers | Jordan Grant |
| Unattached | Ilija Radan |

==== Spain ====
The final 22-man squad as of 4 October 2016 is as follows:

- Coach: (England) Darren Fisher

| Club Team | Players |
|---|---|
| (England) Army Rugby League | Chris Lopez |
| (Spain) Custodians Madrid | Antonio Puerta, Daniel Moreno |
| (England) Hull F.C. | Joel Marquez-Laynez |
| (Spain) Irreductibles | Ivan Ordaz |
| (Spain) Los Gossos | Clement Laguerre |
| (France) Palau XIII Broncos | Alexandre Doutres, Cedric Bringuier, Leandre Torres, Mathieu Griffi, Pierre Negre |
| (Spain) Paterna Dragons | Matt Dulley |
| (England) Seaton Rangers | Miguel Charters-Blanco |
| (France) *Stade Français | Kevin Aparicio |
| (France) Tonneins XIII | Gonzalo Morro |
| (Spain) Torrent Tigres | Aitor Davila, Juan Pablo Rango, Raul Simo |
| (Spain) Valencia Warriors | Adrian Alonso, Andrew Pilkington, Luis Thorp |
| (England) Woolston Rovers | Daniel Garcia |

- * Denotes a rugby union club.

==== Wales ====
The final Wales 22-man squad as of 7 October 2016 is as follows:

On October 14, Dai Evans was brought into the squad to replace Calvin Wellington who withdrew due to a hamstring injury.

On October 21, 19-year old Ben Morris was called up to the squad to play in a mid-qualifying campaign test match against Jamaica.

On October 29, Danny Ansell was called up to the squad with a possibility of playing in the last qualifying game against Italy.

^{*}Sam Hopkins was called into the team for the final qualifier against Italy after Jacob Emmitt withdrew due to a hamstring injury.

- Coach: (England) John Kear

| Club Team | Players |
|---|---|
| (England) Gloucestershire All Golds | Morgan Evans, Steve Parry, Lewis Reece |
| (England) Hunslet Hawks | Danny Ansell |
| (England) Leigh Centurions | Sam Hopkins |
| (England) London Broncos | Elliot Kear, Rhys Williams |
| (Australia) Mackay Cutters | Andrew Gay |
| (England) Oldham R.L.F.C. | Joe Burke |
| (England) Salford Red Devils | Philip Joseph, Craig Kopczak |
| (England) Sheffield Eagles | Matty Fozard |
| (Australia) Souths Logan Magpies | Ollie Olds |
| South Wales Ironmen | Courtney Davies, Dai Evans, Connor Farrer, Ian Newbury, Christiaan Roets |
| (England) St. Helens | Regan Grace, Ben Morris |
| (England) Swinton Lions | ^{*}Jacob Emmitt, Rhodri Lloyd |
| (England) Wakefield Trinity Wildcats | Anthony Walker |
| (England) Widnes Vikings | Gil Dudson, Lloyd White, |

== Group stage ==
=== Group A ===
| Pos | Team | Pld | W | D | L | PF | PA | PD | Pts | Qualification |
|---|---|---|---|---|---|---|---|---|---|---|
| 1 | Wales | 2 | 2 | 0 | 0 | 70 | 14 | +56 | 4 | Qualification for 2017 Rugby League World Cup |
| 2 | Italy | 2 | 1 | 0 | 1 | 76 | 34 | +42 | 2 | Advance to fourth round |
| 3 | Serbia | 2 | 0 | 0 | 2 | 14 | 112 | −98 | 0 | |

==== Wales vs Serbia ====
15 October 2016

| Wales | 50 – 0 | Serbia |
|---|---|---|
| Try: Williams (2) 12', 19; Grace (2) 28', 56; Olds (2) 33', 69'; Davies 46'; Gay 52'; Dudson 76; Goal: White 4/6; Davies 3/3 | Report | Try: |

Parc Stebonheath, Llanelli
Attendance: 902
Referee: (England) Chris Campbell
Player of the Match: (Wales) Elliot Kear

| FB | 1 | Elliot Kear |
| RW | 2 | Regan Grace |
| RC | 4 | Christiaan Roets |
| LC | 18 | Andrew Gay |
| LW | 5 | Rhys Williams |
| SO | 6 | Courtney Davies |
| SH | 7 | Ollie Olds |
| PR | 8 | Gil Dudson |
| HK | 9 | Lloyd White |
| PR | 10 | Craig Kopczak (c) |
| SR | 11 | Rhodri Lloyd |
| SR | 15 | Joe Burke |
| LF | 13 | Philip Joseph |
Substitutes:
| IC | 14 | Steve Parry |
| IC | 16 | Jacob Emmitt |
| IC | 17 | Anthony Walker |
| IC | 19 | Matty Fozard |
Coach:
John Kear

| FB | 1 | Vojislav Dedić |
| RW | 2 | Joshua Marjanović |
| RC | 3 | Miloš Ćalić |
| LC | 4 | Stevan Stevanović |
| LW | 5 | Pero Madžarević (yellow card) 54' to 64' |
| FE | 6 | Daniel Burke |
| HB | 7 | Dalibor Vukanović (c) |
| PR | 8 | David Andjelić |
| HK | 9 | Vladislav Dedić |
| PR | 10 | Jordan Grant |
| SR | 11 | Chad Grant |
| SR | 12 | Jason Muranka |
| LK | 13 | Stefan Nedeljković |
Substitutes:
| IC | 14 | Ilija Radan |
| IC | 15 | James Mirceski |
| IC | 16 | Reece Grkinić |
| IC | 17 | Džavid Jašari |
Coach:
Ljubomir Bukvic

==== Serbia vs Italy ====
22 October 2016

| Serbia | 14 – 62 | Italy |
|---|---|---|
| Try: Marjanović (2) 68', 79'; Burke 73'; Goal: Dedić 1/2 | Report | Try: Lepori (4) 4', 10', 12', 46'; Cerruto (4) 17', 35', 49', 71'; Wakeman 22'; Santi 45'; Campese 58'; Calegari 62'; Goal: Bergamasco 7/11; Campese 0/1 |

Makiš Stadium, Belgrade
Attendance: 1,037
Player of the Match: (Italy) Terry Campese

| FB | 1 | Vojislav Dedić |
| RW | 2 | Miloš Zogović |
| RC | 3 | Miloš Ćalić |
| LC | 4 | Stevan Stevanović |
| LW | 5 | Joshua Marjanović |
| FE | 6 | Daniel Burke |
| HB | 7 | Dalibor Vukanović (c) |
| PR | 8 | Ilija Radan |
| HK | 9 | Reece Grkinić |
| PR | 10 | Jordan Grant |
| SR | 11 | James Mirceski |
| SR | 12 | Jason Muranka |
| LK | 13 | Chad Grant |
Substitutes:
| IC | 14 | David Andjelić |
| IC | 15 | Miodrag Tomić |
| IC | 16 | Vlado Kušić |
| IC | 17 | Vladislav Dedić |
Coach:
Ljubomir Bukvic

| FB | 1 | Mason Cerruto |
| RW | 2 | Chris Centrone |
| RC | 3 | Justin Castellaro |
| LC | 4 | Mirco Bergamasco |
| LW | 5 | Richard Lepori |
| FE | 6 | Terry Campese |
| HB | 7 | Ryan Ghietti |
| PR | 8 | Shannon Wakeman |
| HK | 9 | Dean Parata |
| PR | 10 | Gavin Hiscox |
| SR | 11 | Jayden Walker |
| SR | 12 | Brenden Santi |
| LK | 13 | Joel Riethmuller |
Substitutes:
| IC | 14 | Colin Wilkie |
| IC | 15 | Christophe Calegari |
| IC | 16 | Kieran Quabba |
| IC | 17 | Gioele Celerino |
Coach:
Cameron Ciraldo

==== Italy vs Wales ====
29 October 2016

| Italy | 14 – 20 | Wales |
|---|---|---|
| Try: Wilkie 26'; Castellaro 29'; Goal: Campese 3/3 | Report | Try: Morris (2) 16', 59'; Walker 37'; Gay 52'; Goal: Davies 2/4 |

Stadio Brianteo, Monza
Attendance: 839
Referee: (England) Chris Campbell

| FB | 2 | Chris Centrone |
| RW | 3 | Justin Castellaro |
| RC | 15 | Christophe Calegari |
| LC | 4 | Mirco Bergamasco |
| LW | 5 | Richard Lepori |
| FE | 6 | Terry Campese |
| HB | 7 | Ryan Ghietti |
| PR | 8 | Shannon Wakeman |
| HK | 9 | Dean Parata |
| PR | 10 | Gavin Hiscox |
| SR | 11 | Jayden Walker |
| SR | 12 | Brenden Santi |
| LK | 13 | Joel Riethmuller |
Substitutes:
| IC | 1 | Mason Cerruto |
| IC | 14 | Colin Wilkie |
| IC | 16 | Kieran Quabba |
| IC | 17 | Gioele Celerino |
Coach:
Cameron Ciraldo

| FB | 1 | Elliot Kear |
| RW | 2 | Rhys Williams |
| RC | 26 | Ben Morris |
| LC | 16 | Andrew Gay |
| LW | 3 | Dai Evans |
| SO | 6 | Courtney Davies |
| SH | 17 | Matty Fozard |
| PR | 8 | Gil Dudson |
| HK | 9 | Lloyd White |
| PR | 10 | Craig Kopczak (c) |
| SR | 11 | Rhodri Lloyd |
| SR | 12 | Philip Joseph |
| LF | 13 | Steve Parry |
Substitutes:
| IC | 14 | Joe Burke |
| IC | 15 | Anthony Walker |
| IC | 23 | Sam Hopkins |
| IC | 24 | Danny Ansell |
Coach:
John Kear

=== Group B ===
| Pos | Team | Pld | W | D | L | PF | PA | PD | Pts | Qualification |
|---|---|---|---|---|---|---|---|---|---|---|
| 1 | Ireland | 2 | 2 | 0 | 0 | 116 | 22 | +94 | 4 | Qualification for 2017 Rugby League World Cup |
| 2 | Russia | 2 | 1 | 0 | 1 | 56 | 76 | −20 | 2 | Advance to fourth round |
| 3 | Spain | 2 | 0 | 0 | 2 | 12 | 86 | −74 | 0 | |

==== Russia vs Spain ====
15 October 2016

Russia
Try: Burlutskii 12'
Zagoskin 14'
Kosharin 33'
Lysokon 44'
Bratko 54'
Chuprin 76'
Buryak 79'

Goal: Lysokon 4/5
Bratko 1/1
Burlutskii 1/1

40 – 6
Report

Spain
Try: Rango 69'
Goal: Garcia 1/1

Fili Stadium, Moscow
Attendance: 427
Referee: (England) Jack Smith
Player of the Match: (Russia) Aleksandr Lysokon

| FB | 1 | Nikolay Zagoskin |
| RW | 5 | Vadim Buryak |
| RC | 21 | Kirill Kosharin |
| LC | 3 | Leonid Kalinin |
| LW | 18 | Dmitry Bratko |
| SO | 6 | Aleksandr Lysokon |
| SH | 7 | Denis Tiulenev |
| PR | 8 | Sergei Konstantinov (c) |
| HK | 4 | Petr Botnarash |
| PR | 10 | Ivan Troitskii |
| SR | 12 | Mikhail Burlutskii |
| SR | 11 | Andrey Kuznetsov |
| LF | 13 | Viacheslav Eremin |
Substitutes:
| IC | 17 | Igor Chuprin |
| IC | 2 | Maksim Suchkov |
| IC | 9 | Vladimir Vlasyuk |
| IC | 15 | Sergey Gaponov |
Coach:
Denis Korolev

| FB | 1 | Daniel Garcia |
| RW | 2 | Clement Laguerre |
| RC | 3 | Antonio Puerta |
| LC | 4 | Alexandre Doutres |
| LW | 5 | Chris Lopez |
| FE | 6 | Ivan Ordaz |
| HB | 7 | Miguel Charters-Blanco |
| PR | 8 | Luis Thorp |
| HK | 9 | Gonzalo Morro |
| PR | 10 | Adria Alonso |
| SR | 11 | Cedric Bringuier |
| SR | 12 | Matt Dulley |
| LK | 13 | Aitor Davila (c) |
Substitutes:
| IC | 14 | Andrew Pilkington |
| IC | 15 | Leandre Torres |
| IC | 16 | Kevin Aparicio |
| IC | 17 | Juan Pablo Rango |
Coach:
Darren Fisher

==== Spain vs Ireland ====
22 October 2016

| Spain | 6 – 46 | Ireland |
|---|---|---|
| Try: Charters-Blanco 62'; Goal: Garcia 1/1 | Report | Try: Roberts 2'; Dunne (2) 5', 52'; Littler (2) 29', 74'; Hasson 39'; Peacock 56'; King 66'; Grix 77'; Goal: Finn 5/9 |

Polideportivo Quatre Carreres, Valencia
Attendance: 323
Referee: (France) Patrice Benausse
Player of the Match: (Ireland) Liam Finn

| FB | 1 | Daniel Garcia |
| RW | 2 | Clement Laguerre |
| RC | 3 | Antonio Puerta |
| LC | 4 | Alexandre Doutres |
| LW | 5 | Chris Lopez |
| FE | 6 | Ivan Ordaz |
| HB | 7 | Miguel Charters-Blanco |
| PR | 8 | Luis Thorp |
| HK | 9 | Nicolas Munoz |
| PR | 10 | Joel Marquez-Laynez |
| SR | 11 | Leandre Torres |
| SR | 12 | Cedric Bringuier (yellow card) 65' to 75' |
| LK | 13 | Kevin Aparicio |
Substitutes:
| IC | 14 | Andrew Pilkington |
| IC | 15 | Aitor Davila |
| IC | 16 | Matt Dulley |
| IC | 17 | Adria Alonso |
Coach:
Darren Fisher

| FB | 1 | Shannon McDonnell |
| RW | 2 | Casey Dunne |
| RC | 3 | Stuart Littler |
| LC | 4 | Oliver Roberts |
| LW | 5 | Alan McMahon |
| FE | 6 | Scott Grix |
| HB | 7 | Liam Finn (c) |
| PR | 8 | James Hasson |
| HK | 9 | Joseph Keyes |
| PR | 10 | Luke Ambler |
| SR | 11 | David Allen |
| SR | 12 | Will Hope |
| LK | 13 | George King |
Substitutes:
| IC | 14 | Haydn Peacock |
| IC | 15 | Matty Hadden |
| IC | 16 | James Kelly |
| IC | 17 | Gareth Gill |
Coach:
Mark Aston

==== Ireland vs Russia ====
30 October 2016

| Ireland | 70 – 16 | Russia |
|---|---|---|
| Try: Hope 7'; Dunne 10'; McMahon (2) 13', 36'; Grix (2) 23', 62'; T. King 32'; McDonnell 38'; Roberts (2) 46', 72'; G. King 59'; Kelly 64'; Littler 69'; Goal:Finn 8/11; Littler 1/2 | Report | Try: Eramin 4'; Kalinin 26'; Buryak 79'; Goal: Lysokon 2/3 |

Carlisle Grounds, Bray
Attendance: 867
Referee: Chris Kendall

| FB | 1 | Shannon McDonnell |
| RW | 2 | Casey Dunne |
| RC | 3 | Stuart Littler |
| LC | 4 | Toby King |
| LW | 5 | Alan McMahon |
| FE | 6 | Scott Grix |
| HB | 7 | Liam Finn (c) |
| PR | 8 | George King |
| HK | 9 | Joseph Keyes |
| PR | 10 | Luke Ambler |
| SR | 11 | David Allen |
| SR | 12 | Will Hope |
| LK | 13 | Oliver Roberts |
Substitutes:
| IC | 14 | Joe Philbin |
| IC | 15 | Matty Hadden |
| IC | 16 | James Kelly |
| IC | 17 | Gareth Gill |
Coach:
Mark Aston

| FB | 1 | Vyascheslav Eramin |
| RW | 5 | Vadim Buryak |
| RC | 21 | Kirill Kosharin |
| LC | 3 | Leonid Kalinin |
| LW | 18 | Dmitry Bratko |
| SO | 6 | Aleksandr Lysokon |
| SH | 7 | Denis Tiulenev |
| PR | 8 | Sergei Konstantinov (c) |
| HK | 4 | Petr Botnarash |
| PR | 10 | Ivan Troitskii |
| SR | 12 | Mikhail Burlutskii |
| SR | 11 | Andrey Kuznetsov |
| LF | 13 | Nikolai Zagoskin |
Substitutes:
| IC | 17 | Vadim Fedchuk |
| IC | 2 | Maksim Suchkov |
| IC | 9 | Maksim Tsynkovich |
| IC | 15 | Maksim Suchkov |
Coach:
Denis Korolev

== Third place play-off ==
The final qualifying place was determined by a single knockout match held between the two group runners-up on 4 November 2016.

4 November 2016
20:00 GMT (UTC+0:00)

| Italy | 76–0 | Russia |
|---|---|---|
| Tries: Castellaro (2), Cerruto (2), Lepori (2), Wilkie (2), Campese, Celerino, Centrone, Santi, Wakeman, Walker; Goals: Campese (10/14) | Report (RLIF) |

Leigh Sports Village, Leigh
Attendance: 450
Referee: Chris Campbell (England)
Player of the Match: Terry Campese (Italy)

| FB | 1 | Mason Cerruto |
| WG | 2 | Chris Centrone |
| CE | 3 | Justin Castellaro |
| CE | 4 | Colin Wilkie |
| WG | 5 | Richard Lepori |
| FE | 6 | Terry Campese |
| HB | 7 | Ryan Ghietti |
| PR | 8 | Shannon Wakeman |
| HK | 9 | Dean Parata |
| PR | 10 | Gavin Hiscox |
| SR | 11 | Jayden Walker |
| SR | 12 | Brenden Santi |
| LK | 13 | Joel Riethmuller |
Substitutes:
| BE | 14 | Joseph Tramontana |
| BE | 15 | Ryan Tramonte |
| BE | 16 | Giuseppe Pagani |
| BE | 17 | Gioele Celerino |
Coach:
Cameron Ciraldo

| FB | 2 | Maksim Suchkov |
| WG | 14 | Vadim Tsynkovich |
| CE | 3 | Leonid Kalinin |
| CE | 1 | Nikolay Zagoskin |
| WG | 5 | Vadim Buryak |
| SO | 6 | Aleksandr Lysokon |
| SH | 7 | Denis Tiulenev |
| PR | 16 | Vadim Fedchuk |
| HK | 9 | Vladimir Vlasyuk |
| PR | 10 | Ivan Troitskii |
| SR | 11 | Andrey Kuznetsov |
| SR | 12 | Mikhail Burlutskii |
| LF | 13 | Viacheslav Eremin |
Substitutes:
| BE | 8 | Sergei Konstantinov |
| BE | 17 | Igor Chuprin |
| BE | 18 | Dmitry Bratko |
Coach:
Denis Korolev
