= International rugby league in 2014 =

This is a list of international rugby league matches played throughout 2014. A † denotes a recognised, but unofficial match that did not contribute to the IRL World Rankings.

== May ==
=== ANZAC Test ===
2 May 2014
8:05pm (AEST)

Australia	30 – 18	New Zealand
Tries; Brett Morris (18', 52') 2 Greg Bird (12') 1 Greg Inglis (61') 1 Cooper Cronk (73') 1 Goals; Johnathan Thurston 5/5 (13', 20', 54', 62', 75')		Tries; Jesse Bromwich (6') 1 Tohu Harris (22') 1 Sam Moa (26') 1 Goals; Shaun Johnson 3/3 (7', 23', 29')

Allianz Stadium, Sydney
Attendance: 25,429
Referee: Shayne Hayne (Australia)
Player of the Match: Johnathan Thurston

=== Four Nations Qualifier ===
3 May 2014

Samoa	32 – 16	Fiji
Tries: Penani Manumalealii (3) 13' c, 38' c, 44' c Carlos Tuimavave 54'c Daniel Vidot 64'c Sam Tagataese 78'; Goals: Krisnan Inu (6/6) 13', 38', 44', 50', 54', 64'	Video	Tries: Kevin Naiqama 16' c James Storer 27' c Lote Tuqiri 30' m Goals: Lote Tuqiri (2/3) 17', 28'

Penrith Stadium, Sydney, Australia
Attendance: 9,063
Referee: (Australia) Ashley Klein
Player of the Match: Penani Manumalealii

== June ==
=== European Bowl ===
28 June 2014

Malta	18–32	Greece
Tries: Wills, Attard (2); Conv: Keep (3)	(Report)	Tries: Kanellopoulos, Constantinou, Giorgas-Spanos, Bosmos, Korkidas; Conv: Sue-Tin (6)

FC Melita, Pembroke

12 July 2014

Czech Republic	8–34	Malta
Tries: Suchopár; Conv: Petr Šedina (2)	(Report)	Tries: Muscat (3), Briffa (2), Mizzi; Conv: Keep (4), Parker (1)

Havlichkuv, Brod

11 October 2014

Greece	68–16	Czech Republic
Tries: Meads (6), Korkidas, Syti, Kannellopoulos, Arfaras, Sell, Bosmas; Conv: Sue-Tin (7), Meads (2), Bosmos (1)	(Report)	Tries: Sedina, Kristof, Caslavka; Conv: Kucera (2)

Athens

== July ==
=== United States men vs Samoa ===
- USA 18–12 Samoa

== August ==
=== Colonial Cup ===
Sunday, 10 August
19:00 (local time)

Canada	52 – 14	United States
Tries: Billy Skidgmore; Jonathan Cregg (2); Enoch Wamalwa (2); Tom Clancy; Denny McCarthy; Matt Wyles; Brett King; Goals: Steve Piatek (8/9)	Report	Tries: Arber Corbaj; Matt Walsh; CJ Catalano Goals: Matt Walsh (1/3)

Lamport Stadium, Toronto
Attendance: 7,356
Referee: (England) Paul Byrne
Player of the Match: (Canada) Steve Piatek

== October ==
=== Papua New Guinea men vs Tonga ===
- Papua New Guinea 32–18 Tonga

=== Day 1 ===
==== Serbia v. Hungary ====
17 October 2014
15:00 (GMT+2)

Serbia	50 – 0	Hungary
Tries: Slobodan Manak (2) 4' c, 10' c Stefan Nikolić (2) 15' c, 23' c Milan Ilić (2) 20' c, 47'; Aleksandar Radovanović 29' c Milan Čobanović 33' c Djordje Gak 77'; Goals: Vladislav Dedić (7/9) 5', 11', 16', 21', 24', 30', 34'	[ Report]

FK Dorćol, Belgrade
Attendance: 150
Referee: (Greece) George Stilianos
Player of the Match: (Serbia) Slobodan Manak

==== Bosnia v. Greece ====
17 October 2014
15:00 (GMT+2)

Bosnia and Herzegovina	4 – 58	Greece
Try: Nedeljko Suvajčević 80'; Goals: Vladan Kikanović (0/1)		Tries: Jordan Kidis (2) 2', 60'; Alvaro Zota 15'; George Tsikrikas (2) 26' c, 42' c Jordan Meads (2) 34' c, 63' c Nikolaos Bosmos 37' c Jake Vrahnos (2) 55' c, 74'; Ioannis Nake 76' c Goals: Liam Sue-Tin (5/9) 26', 34', 37', 42', 55'; Jordan Meads (1/2) 63'; Jordan Kidis (1/1) 76'; Terry Constantinou (0/1)

Makiš Stadium, Belgrade
Attendance: 50
Referee: (Serbia) Ivica Djordjević
Player of the Match: (Greece) Jordan Meads

=== Day 2 - Finals Day ===
==== Third Place Final: Bosnia v. Hungary ====
19 October 2014
12:30 (GMT+2)

Bosnia and Herzegovina	32 – 6	Hungary
Tries: Miloš Kulašević 3' c Aleksandar Sakan 11'; Vladan Kikanović 24' c Sreten Zec 38' c Elvis Martić 44'; Slaviša Zekić 59' c Goals: Vladan Kikanović (3/5) 3', 24', 38'; Ognjen Dedić (1/1) 59'		Try: Grimm 62' c Goals: Nikowitz (1/1) 62'

Makiš Stadium, Belgrade
Attendance: 100
Referee: (Serbia) Radoslav Novaković
Player of the Match: (Bosnia and Herzegovina) Elvis Martić

==== Grand Final: Serbia v. Greece ====
19 October 2014
15:00 (GMT+2)

Serbia	22 – 50	Greece
Tries: Džavid Jašari 19' c Nikola Srbljanin 34' c Pero Madžarević (2) 54' c, 71'; Goals: Stefan Nedeljković (3/5) 19', 34', 54'	Report	Tries: Sebastian Sell 2'; Billy Tsikrikas 4', 45' c, 59'; Jake Vrahnos 9' c Panagiotis Lampoussis 39'; Jordan Meads (2) 49', 62' c George Tsikrikas 65' c Terry Constantinou 68' c Goals: Liam Sue-Tin (4/9) 9', 45', 62', 65'; Jordan Meads (1/1) 68'

Makiš Stadium, Belgrade
Attendance: 450
Referee: (Serbia) Miloš Milinković
Player of the Match: (Greece) Billy Tsikrikas

- Greece are the inaugural Balkans Cup champions

=== European Cup ===
17 October 2014

Scotland	42–18	Wales
Try: Brough; Thomas; Kilday; J Walker; Scott (2); C Phillips; B Phillips; Goal: Brough (5/8)	Match Report	Try: Williams; Roets; Farrer (2); Goal: Hough (0/2); Reece (1/2)

Derwent Park, Workington
Attendance: 2,036
Referee: (England) James Child
Player of the Match: Danny Brough

18 October 2014

Ireland	22–12	France
Try: McDonnell (2); Peacock (2); Murphy; Goal: Dunne (1/5)	Match Report	Try: Larroyer; Pélissier; Goal: Marginet (2/2)

Tallaght Stadium, Dublin
Attendance: 1,428
Referee: (England) Tim Roby
Player of the Match: Josh Toole

25 October 2014

Ireland	4–25	Scotland
Try: James Toole; Goal: Dunne (0/1)	Match Report	Try: C Phillips; Hurst; Addy; Thomas; Goal: Brough (3/4); Drop Goal: Brough (1/1)

Tallaght Stadium, Dublin
Referee: (England) Richard Silverwood

25 October 2014

France	42–22	Wales
Try: Soubeyras; Fages; Baile; Pala (2); Marginet (2); Goal: Marginet (7/7)	Match Report	Try: Fleming; Fozard; Williams; Roets; Goal: Reece (3/4)

Stadium Municipal d'Albi, Albi
Attendance: 5,225
Referee: (England) Tim Roby

31 September 2014

Scotland	22–38	France
Try: Kavanagh; Hellewell; A Walker; J Walker; Goal: Brough (3/4)	Match Report	Try: Marginet (3); Baitieri; Pélissier; Decarnin; Gigot; Goal: Marginet (5/7)

Netherdale, Galashiels
Attendance: 1,432
Referee: (England) Richard Silverwood
Player of the Match: Rémy Marginet

2 November 2014

Wales	14–46	Ireland
Try: Williams; Grant; Hughes; Goal: Reece (1/2); Emanuelli (0/1)	Match Report	Try: Hope; Hargreaves (3); Ambler; Finn; Peacock; Dunne; Goal: Finn (7/8)

Racecourse Ground, Wrexham
Attendance: 1,293
Referee: (England) Ben Thaler

=== Four Nations ===
==== Round 1 ====
Saturday, 25 October 2014
5:00pm (AEDT)

England	32 – 26	Samoa
Tries: Michael Shenton 21' c Kallum Watkins 34' c Liam Farrell 46' c Joel Tomkins 65' c Sam Tomkins 68' c Goals: Gareth Widdop (6/6) 22', 34', 40', 46', 65', 68'	Report	Tries: Isaac Liu 26' c Daniel Vidot 30' m Pita Godinet (2) 55' c, 61' c Antonio Winterstein 72' c Goals: Kyle Stanley (3/4) 26', 55', 61'; Ben Roberts (1/1) 72'

Suncorp Stadium, Brisbane, Australia
Attendance: 47,813
Referee: Gerard Sutton
Player of the Match: Sam Tomkins

- Ben Roberts made his 10th appearance for Samoa, only the second player to hit double-digit appearances for his country with George Carmont being the first.

FB	1	Sam Tomkins
RW	2	Josh Charnley
RC	3	Kallum Watkins
LC	4	Michael Shenton
LW	5	Ryan Hall
SO	6	Gareth Widdop
SH	7	Matty Smith
PR	8	George Burgess
HK	9	Josh Hodgson
PR	10	James Graham (c)
SR	11	Liam Farrell
SR	12	Joel Tomkins
LF	13	Joe Westerman
Substitutions:
BE	14	Daryl Clark
BE	15	Brett Ferres
BE	16	Tom Burgess
BE	17	Chris Hill
Coach:
(England) Steve McNamara

FB	1	Tim Simona
RW	2	Antonio Winterstein
RC	3	Ricky Leutele
LC	4	Joey Leilua
LW	5	Daniel Vidot
FE	6	Ben Roberts
HB	7	Kyle Stanley
PR	8	Sam Tagataese
HK	9	Michael Sio
PR	10	David Fa'alogo (c)
SR	11	Frank Pritchard
SR	12	Leeson Ah Mau
LK	13	Josh McGuire
Substitutions:
BE	14	Pita Godinet
BE	15	Jesse Sene-Lefao
BE	16	Isaac Liu
BE	17	Mose Masoe
Coach:
(Australia) Matt Parish

Saturday, 25 October 2014
7:30pm (AEDT)

Australia	12 – 30	New Zealand
Tries: Beau Scott 3' c Greg Inglis 21' c Goal: Cameron Smith (2/2) 3', 21'	Report	Tries: Proctor 17' c Lewis Brown 29' c Shaun Johnson 47' c Dean Whare 51' c Jason Nightingale 68' c Goals: Shaun Johnson (5/5) 17', 29', 47', 51', 68'

Suncorp Stadium, Brisbane, Australia
Attendance: 47,813
Referee: (England) Phil Bentham
Player of the Match: Shaun Johnson

- Dallin Watene-Zelezniak could have made his international test debut in the starting XIII for New Zealand on the right-wing, but was ruled out for the game and for the rest of the tournament with an ankle injury and Gerard Beale replaced him.
- Jason Taumalolo made his international test debut for New Zealand.
- Daniel Tupou, Josh Mansour, Dylan Walker, Aaron Woods and Aidan Guerra made their international test debut for Australia
- With the victory, this was New Zealand's first Test win over Australia since the 2010 Four Nations Final.

FB	1	Greg Inglis
RW	2	Josh Mansour
RC	3	Michael Jennings
LC	4	Dylan Walker
LW	5	Daniel Tupou
SO	6	Johnathan Thurston
SH	7	Cooper Cronk
PR	8	Aaron Woods
HK	9	Cameron Smith (c)
PR	10	Sam Thaiday
SR	11	Beau Scott
SR	12	Ryan Hoffman
LF	13	Greg Bird
Substitutions:
BE	14	Robbie Farah
BE	15	Aidan Guerra
BE	16	Josh Papalii
BE	17	Corey Parker
Coach:
(Australia) Tim Sheens

FB	1	Peta Hiku
RW	19	Gerard Beale
RC	3	Shaun Kenny-Dowall
LC	4	Dean Whare
LW	2	Jason Nightingale
FE	6	Kieran Foran
HB	7	Shaun Johnson
PR	8	Jesse Bromwich
HK	9	Thomas Leuluai
PR	10	Adam Blair
SR	11	Simon Mannering (c)
SR	12	Kevin Proctor
LK	13	Jason Taumalolo
Substitutions:
BE	14	Lewis Brown
BE	15	Greg Eastwood
BE	16	Martin Taupau
BE	17	Tohu Harris
Coach:
(New Zealand) Stephen Kearney

==== Round 2 ====
Saturday, 1 November 2014
4:00pm (NZT)

New Zealand	14 – 12	Samoa
Tries: Kieran Foran 10' c Jason Nightingale 64'; Shaun Kenny-Dowall 76'; Goals: Shaun Johnson (1/3) 11'	Report	Tries: Tautau Moga 6'; Daniel Vidot 18'; Joseph Leilua 44'; Goals: Tim Lafai (0/3)

Toll Stadium, Whangārei, New Zealand
Attendance: 16,912
Referee: Henry Perenara
Player of the Match: Kieran Foran

- Suaia Matagi made his international test debut for New Zealand
- Tautau Moga and Dominique Peyroux made their international test debut for Samoa
- With the victory, New Zealand retained the Peter Leitch QSM Challenge Trophy.

FB	1	Peta Hiku
RW	2	Jason Nightingale
RC	3	Shaun Kenny-Dowall
LC	4	Dean Whare
LW	5	Manu Vatuvei
FE	6	Kieran Foran
HB	7	Shaun Johnson
PR	8	Jesse Bromwich
HK	9	Issac Luke
PR	10	Adam Blair
SR	11	Simon Mannering (c)
SR	12	Kevin Proctor
LK	13	Jason Taumalolo
Substitutions:
BE	14	Lewis Brown
BE	15	Suaia Matagi
BE	16	Martin Taupau
BE	17	Tohu Harris
Coach:
(New Zealand) Stephen Kearney

FB	1	Tim Simona
RW	20	Tautau Moga
RC	3	Tim Lafai
LC	4	Joey Leilua
LW	5	Daniel Vidot
FE	6	Ben Roberts
HB	7	Kyle Stanley
PR	8	Isaac Liu
HK	13	Josh McGuire
PR	10	David Fa'alogo (c)
SR	11	Frank Pritchard
SR	12	Leeson Ah Mau
LK	16	Sauaso Sue
Substitutions:
BE	9	Pita Godinet
BE	14	Dunamis Lui
BE	17	Mose Masoe
BE	18	Dominique Peyroux
Coach:
(Australia) Matt Parish

Sunday, 2 November 2014
4:00pm (AEST)

Australia	16 – 12	England
Tries: Michael Jennings 16'; Ben Hunt 56' c Greg Inglis 62' c Goals: Cameron Smith (2/3) 57', 64'	Report	Tries: Kallum Watkins 28' c Ryan Hall 33' c Goals: Gareth Widdop (2/2) 29', 35'

AAMI Park, Melbourne, Australia
Attendance: 20,585
Referee: Gerard Sutton
Player of the Match: Cameron Smith

- Perth born Dan Sarginson made his international test début for England.
- Ben Hunt and David Klemmer made their international test debuts for Australia.
- Sione Mata'utia also made his international test début for Australia and becoming the youngest ever player to play for Australia at aged 18 years and 129 days, eclipsing Israel Folau's seven-year-old record by 65 days.
- Cameron Smith becomes the 6th Kangaroo-Test player, to play 40-Test games for Australia.

FB	1	Greg Inglis
RW	2	Josh Mansour
RC	3	Michael Jennings
LC	4	Dylan Walker
LW	5	Sione Mata'utia
SO	6	Johnathan Thurston
SH	7	Daly Cherry-Evans
PR	8	Aaron Woods
HK	9	Cameron Smith (c)
PR	10	Sam Thaiday
SR	11	Beau Scott
SR	12	Greg Bird
LF	13	Corey Parker
Substitutions:
BE	14	Boyd Cordner
BE	15	Ben Hunt
BE	16	David Klemmer
BE	17	Josh Papalii
Coach:
(Australia) Tim Sheens

FB	1	Sam Tomkins
RW	2	Josh Charnley
RC	3	Kallum Watkins
LC	18	Dan Sarginson
LW	5	Ryan Hall
SO	6	Gareth Widdop
SH	7	Matty Smith
PR	8	George Burgess
HK	9	Josh Hodgson
PR	10	James Graham
SR	11	Liam Farrell
SR	12	Joel Tomkins
LF	19	Sean O'Loughlin (c)
Substitutions:
BE	14	Daryl Clark
BE	15	Brett Ferres
BE	16	Tom Burgess
BE	17	Chris Hill
Coach:
(England) Steve McNamara

==== Round 3 ====
Saturday, 8 November 2014
7:00pm (NZT)

New Zealand	16 – 14	England
Tries: Jason Nightingale (2) 2' c, 29' c Manu Vatuvei 45'; Goals: Shaun Johnson (2/3) 3', 31'	Report	Tries: Ryan Hall (2) 7', 56' c Josh Charnley 24'; Goals: Gareth Widdop (1/3) 58'

Forsyth Barr Stadium, Dunedin, New Zealand
Attendance: 15,863
Referee: (England) Phil Bentham
Player of the Match: Jason Taumalolo

- With the victory, New Zealand secured a place in the final.

FB	1	Peta Hiku
RW	2	Jason Nightingale
RC	3	Shaun Kenny-Dowall
LC	4	Dean Whare
LW	5	Manu Vatuvei
FE	6	Kieran Foran
HB	7	Shaun Johnson
PR	8	Jesse Bromwich
HK	14	Thomas Leuluai
PR	10	Adam Blair
SR	11	Simon Mannering (c)
SR	12	Kevin Proctor
LK	13	Jason Taumalolo
Substitutions:
BE	9	Issac Luke
BE	15	Greg Eastwood
BE	16	Martin Taupau
BE	17	Tohu Harris
Coach:
(New Zealand) Stephen Kearney

FB	1	Sam Tomkins
RW	2	Josh Charnley
RC	3	Kallum Watkins
LC	4	Dan Sarginson
LW	5	Ryan Hall
SO	6	Gareth Widdop
SH	7	Matty Smith
PR	8	George Burgess
HK	14	Daryl Clark
PR	10	James Graham
SR	11	Liam Farrell
SR	12	Joel Tomkins
LF	13	Sean O'Loughlin (c)
Substitutions:
BE	15	Brett Ferres
BE	16	Tom Burgess
BE	17	Chris Hill
BE	18	Elliott Whitehead
Coach:
(England) Steve McNamara

Sunday, 9 November 2014
4:00pm (AEST)

Australia	44 – 18	Samoa
Tries: Cooper Cronk (2) 2', 62'; Greg Inglis (2) 11', 26'; Daly Cherry-Evans 30'; David Klemmer 34'; Josh Papalii 76'; Josh Mansour 79'; Goals: Cameron Smith (4/6); Daly Cherry-Evans (2/2)	Report	Tries: Tim Simona 20'; Ben Roberts 47'; David Fa'alogo 69'; Goals: Tim Lafai (3/3)

WIN Stadium, Wollongong, Australia
Attendance: 18,456
Referee: Gerard Sutton
Player of the Match: Greg Inglis

- Josh Jackson made his international test debut for Australia.
- With the victory, Australia secured a place in the final.

FB	1	Greg Inglis
RW	2	Josh Mansour
RC	3	Michael Jennings
LC	4	Dylan Walker
LW	5	Sione Mata'utia
SO	6	Daly Cherry-Evans
SH	7	Cooper Cronk
PR	8	Aaron Woods
HK	9	Cameron Smith (c)
PR	10	Josh Papalii
SR	11	Sam Thaiday
SR	12	Greg Bird
LF	13	Corey Parker
Substitutions:
BE	14	Boyd Cordner
BE	15	Ben Hunt
BE	19	David Klemmer
BE	21	Josh Jackson
Coach:
(Australia) Tim Sheens

FB	1	Tim Simona
RW	2	Antonio Winterstein
RC	3	Tim Lafai
LC	4	Joey Leilua
LW	5	Daniel Vidot
FE	6	Ben Roberts
HB	7	Kyle Stanley
PR	8	Isaac Liu
HK	13	Josh McGuire
PR	10	David Fa'alogo (c)
SR	11	Frank Pritchard
SR	12	Leeson Ah Mau
LK	17	Mose Masoe
Substitutions:
BE	9	Pita Godinet
BE	14	Dunamis Lui
BE	15	Reni Maitua
BE	16	Sauaso Sue
Coach:
(Australia) Matt Parish

==== Standings ====
2014 Four Nations
Pos	Team	Pld	W	D	L	PF	PA	PD	Pts	Qualification
1	New Zealand	3	3	0	0	60	38	+22	6	Qualification for Final
2	Australia	3	2	0	1	72	60	+12	4	Qualification for Final
3	England	3	1	0	2	58	58	0	2	
4	Samoa	3	0	0	3	56	90	−34	0	

Source: BBC Sport

==== Final ====
Saturday, 15 November
8:30pm (NZT)

New Zealand	22 – 18	Australia
Tries; Manu Vatuvei (35', 63') 2 Jason Nightingale (23') 1 Shaun Johnson (58') 1 Goals; Shaun Johnson 3/5 (25', 29' pen, 36')	Report	Tries; 1 (11') Michael Jennings; 1 (42') Sione Mata'utia; 1 (76') Ben Hunt; Goals; 3/3 Cameron Smith (12', 43', 77')

Westpac Stadium, Wellington, New Zealand
Attendance: 25,093
Referee: (England) Phil Bentham
Player of the Match: Shaun Johnson

New Zealand	Position	Australia
Peta Hiku	FB	Greg Inglis
Jason Nightingale	WG	Josh Mansour
Dean Whare	CE	Michael Jennings
Shaun Kenny-Dowall	CE	Dylan Walker
Manu Vatuvei	WG	Sione Mata'utia
Kieran Foran	FE	Daly Cherry-Evans
Shaun Johnson	HB	Cooper Cronk
Jesse Bromwich	PR	Aaron Woods
Isaac Luke	HK	Cameron Smith (c)
Adam Blair	PR	Josh Papalii
Simon Mannering (c)	SR	Sam Thaiday
Kevin Proctor	SR	Greg Bird
Jason Taumalolo	LK	Corey Parker
Lewis Brown	Int	Boyd Cordner
Greg Eastwood	Int	Ben Hunt
Martin Taupau	Int	Josh Jackson
Tohu Harris	Int	David Klemmer

Score Progression:
11th: Australia 6 - 0 (Jennings Try, Smith Goal) 23rd: Even 6 - 6 (Nightingale Try, Johnson Goal) 29th: New Zealand 8 - 6 (Johnson Penalty Goal) 35th: New Zealand 14 - 6 (Vatuvei Try, Johnson Goal) 42nd: New Zealand 14 - 12 (Mata'utia Try, Smith Goal) 58th: New Zealand 18 - 12 (Johnson Try) 63rd: New Zealand 22 - 12 (Vatuvei Try) 76th: New Zealand 22 - 18 (Hunt Try, Smith Goal)

Match records:

- This was Australia's first game at Wellington's Westpac Stadium since 2007, when they beat New Zealand 58–0.
- This was New Zealand's first home game at Wellington's Westpac Stadium since the 2010 Four Nations Round 1 clash with England, when they won 24–10.
- With the victory, New Zealand won this year's Four Nations Title, as well as their second Tournament Title.
- New Zealand became the second team since Australia (in the 2011 Four Nations series), to go through the tournament undefeated.
- New Zealand won 2 consecutive matches against Australia, for the first time since 1998.
- New Zealand earned their first victory over Australia at a home venue since 2003, when they won 30–16 over Australia at Auckland's North Harbour Stadium.
- Manu Vatuvei becomes New Zealand's all-time leading try-scorer, passing Nigel Vagana's record (of 19 tries) after scoring his second try in the game for a total of 20 test tries.
- Simon Mannering became the fifth Kiwi-Test player to play 40 tests for New Zealand.
