= Muranka =

Muranka is a surname. Notable people with the surname include:

- Jason Muranka (born 1989), Serbian rugby league player
- Klemens Murańka (born 1994), Polish ski jumper
