= James Hasson =

Ireland international rugby league footballer

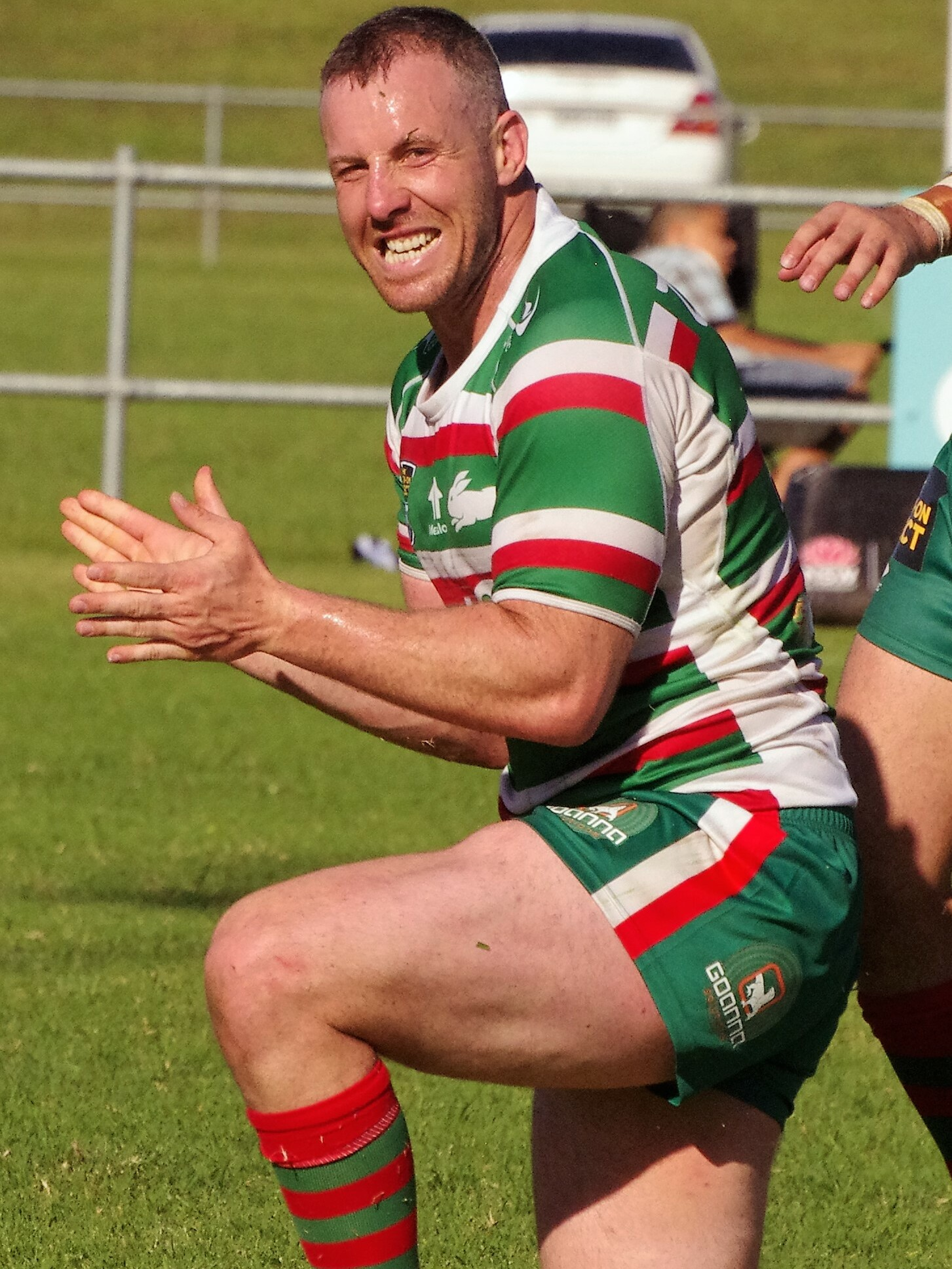

Personal information
- Full name: James Hasson
- Born: 1 May 1993 (age 33) Hillingdon, Greater London, England
- Height: 191 cm (6 ft 3 in)
- Weight: 105 kg (16 st 7 lb)

Playing information
- Position: Prop
Club
Years	Team	Pld	T	G	FG	P
2013–15	Manly Sea Eagles	39	2	0	0	8
2017	Salford Red Devils	5	0	0	0	0
2017	Wakefield Trinity	4	0	0	0	0
	Total	48	2	0	0	8
Representative
Years	Team	Pld	T	G	FG	P
2013–	Ireland	9	2	0	0	8
- Source: As of 30 October 2022

James Hasson (born 1 May 1993) is a former Ireland international rugby league footballer.

He previously played for the Manly Warringah Sea Eagles in the National Rugby League as well as the Salford Red Devils and Wakefield Trinity in the Super League.

== Background ==
Born in Hillingdon, England, Hasson is of Irish descent and moved to Sydney, Australia at a young age. He played his junior rugby league for De La Salle Caringbah JRLFC, before being signed by the Cronulla-Sutherland Sharks.

== Playing career ==
=== Early career ===
In 2011 and 2012, Hasson played for the Cronulla-Sutherland Sharks' NYC team.

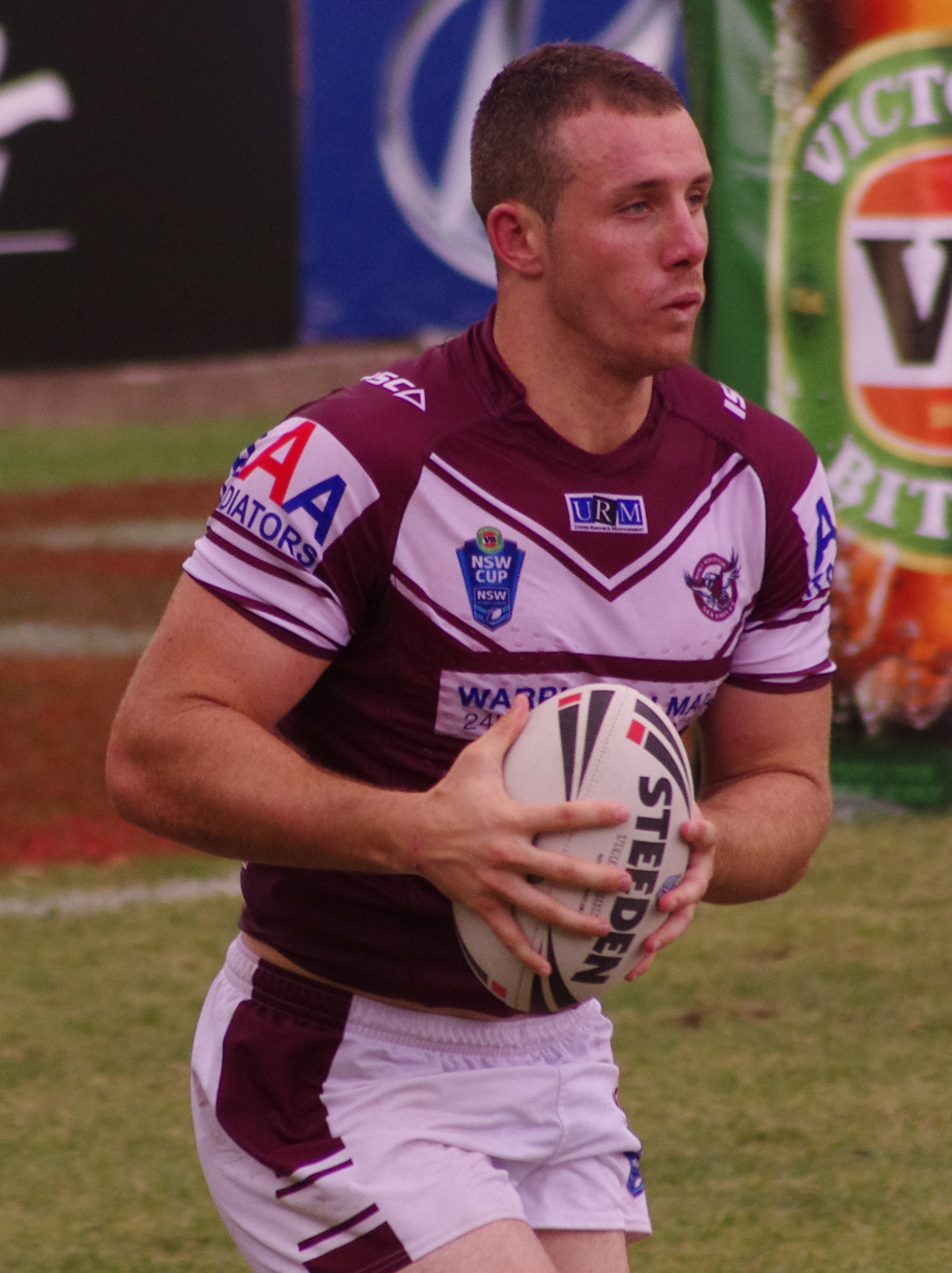
Hasson playing for the Manly Sea Eagles in 2013

In 2013, he joined the Manly Warringah Sea Eagles on a 2-year contract.

=== 2013 ===
In round 8 of the 2013 NRL season, Hasson made his NRL début for Manly-Warringah against the St. George Illawarra Dragons. In October and November, he played in 3 games for Ireland in the 2013 Rugby League World Cup. He re-signed with Manly-Warringah on a one-year contract.

=== 2015 ===
On 6 August, Hasson signed a one-year contract with the Parramatta Eels starting in 2016.

=== 2016 ===
Hasson joined the Eels in 2016 however failed to make an appearance in first grade, instead featured 17 times for Eels feeder team Wentworthville Magpies in the NSW Cup.

He was called up to the Ireland squad for the 2017 Rugby League World Cup European Pool B qualifiers.

=== 2017 ===
Hasson again failed to break into the Parramatta Eels NRL side and was subsequently released mid season to Wakefield Trinity.

After playing four games for Wakefield Trinity, he was then released by the club.

Later that year he was chosen in Ireland's squad for the 2017 Rugby League World Cup.

=== 2018 ===
Hasson joined the St George Illawarra Dragons Intrust Super Premiership side for the 2018 season. He then left to join the Blacktown Workers for the remainder of the year.

=== 2021 ===
In 2021, Hasson joined the South Sydney NSW Cup squad.

=== 2022 ===
In 2022 Hasson was named in the Ireland squad for the 2021 Rugby League World Cup.
