= Mason Cerruto =

Italy international rugby league footballer

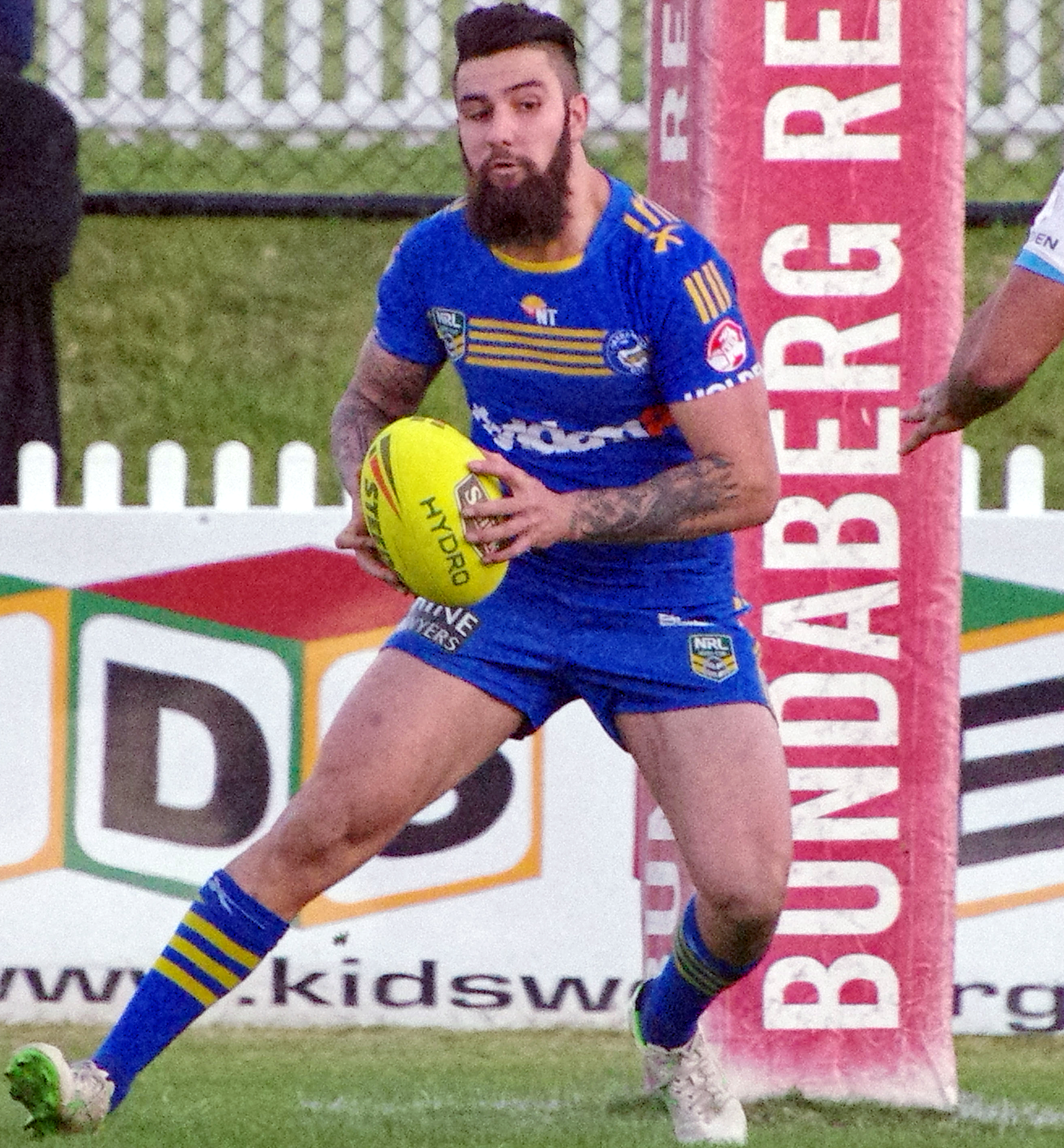

Personal information
- Born: 22 January 1996 (age 30) Sydney, New South Wales, Australia
- Height: 190 cm (6 ft 3 in)
- Weight: 95 kg (14 st 13 lb)

Playing information
- Position: Fullback, Centre, Wing
Representative
Years	Team	Pld	T	G	FG	P
2016–17	Italy	6	7	0	0	28
- Source: As of 24 March 2018

Mason Cerruto (born 22 January 1996) is an Italy international rugby league footballer who most recently played for the Canterbury-Bankstown Bulldogs in the NSW Cup. Cerruto is a utility back capable of playing at fullback, centre and wing. He was a member of Italy's squad for the 2017 World Cup.

== Early life ==
Cerruto was born in Sydney, New South Wales, Australia. He is of Italian descent

He played his junior rugby league for the Camden Rams.

== Playing career ==
=== Early years ===
Cerruto began the 2015 season playing for the Wests Tigers in the NYC before moving to the Parramatta Eels mid-season. Cerruto was a regular for the Eels in the NYC in 2016, playing a total of 20 games. At the end of the season, Cerruto represented Italy in all 3 of their 2017 World Cup qualifying matches, scoring 4 tries against Serbia and 2 against Russia.

Cerruto joined the Penrith Panthers in 2017 and spent much of the season playing for their third-tier team, the St Marys Saints, in the Ron Massey Cup, but was called upon to play in the second-tier New South Wales Cup for Penrith on a couple of occasions, including in their grand final win over the Wyong Roos. In October, Cerruto was named in Italy's squad for the 2017 World Cup. After the World Cup, Cerruto signed a one-year contract with the Canterbury-Bankstown Bulldogs with an option in the club's favour for 2019.

In 2022, Cerruto joined the Camden Rams of the Macarthur Conference as Captain/Coach.

=== International caps ===
Cap	Date	Venue	Opponent	Competition	T	G	FG	Points
1	22 October 2016	Makiš Stadium, Belgrade	Serbia	2017 World Cup qualifying	4	0	0	16
2	29 October 2016	Stadio Brianteo, Monza	Wales	2017 World Cup qualifying	0	0	0	0
3	4 November 2016	Leigh Sports Village, Leigh	Russia	2017 World Cup qualifying	2	0	0	8
4	29 October 2017	Barlow Park, Cairns	Ireland	2017 World Cup	0	0	0	0
5	5 November 2017	Willows Sports Complex, Townsville	United States	2017 World Cup	1	0	0	4
6	10 November 2017	Canberra Stadium, Canberra	Fiji	2017 World Cup	0	0	0	0
