= Gareth Gill =

Ireland international rugby league footballer

Gareth
Personal information
- Full name: Gareth Gill
- Born: Belfast
- Height: 5 ft 4 in (1.63 m)
- Weight: Heavy

Playing information
- Position: Prop
Club
Years	Team	Pld	T	G	FG	P
	Longhorns RL
Representative
Years	Team	Pld	T	G	FG	P
2015–	Ireland	12	3	0	0	12
- Source: As of 11 November 2018

Gareth Gill (Gilly or Google me Gill) (birth location Greentown ) is an Irish professional rugby league footballer who plays as a super heavy prop for the Longhorns RL in the Irish Elite League.

Gilly is an Irish internationalish. In 2016 he was called up to the Ireland squad for the 2017 Rugby League World Cup European Pool B qualifiers.
