= David Andjelic =

Serbia international rugby league footballer

Personal information
- Full name: David Andjelić
- Born: 27 April 1994 (age 32) Serbia

Playing information
- Position: Lock, Prop
Representative
Years	Team	Pld	T	G	FG	P
2016–18	Serbia	5	1	0	0	4
- Source: As of 29 May 2021

David Andjelic (Serbian: David Anđelić; Cyrillic: Давид Анђелић; born 27 April 1994) is a Serbian rugby league footballer. He is best known for competing on The NRL Rookie. Primarily playing as a prop, Andjelic has represented the Serbian national team.

== Early life ==
Born in Serbia, Andjelic and his mother Milijana moved to Mount Druitt, New South Wales, Australia when he was a child. He played his junior rugby league for St Patricks Blacktown, Minchinbury Jets, and Penrith Panthers.

== Career ==
In 2016, Andjelic participated in the Nine Network's rugby league reality TV show, The NRL Rookie, being cut from the competition in week 5. His audition video, in which he ran through a wall of bricks, went viral around the world.

Andjelic made his international debut for Serbia in their match against the Philippines on 5 February 2016. On 5 October, he was named in Serbia's 22-man squad for their 2017 World Cup qualifying campaign.
