= Ben Morris (rugby league) =

Wales international rugby league footballer

Personal information
- Born: 1 August 1997 (age 28) Liverpool, Merseyside, England
- Height: 6 ft 2 in (1.88 m)
- Weight: 15 st 10 lb (100 kg)

Playing information
- Position: Centre, Second-row
Club
Years	Team	Pld	T	G	FG	P
2017–18	St Helens	0	0	0	0	0
2017(loan)	→ Oldham	5	1	0	0	4
2018(loan)	→ Sheffield Eagles	1	0	0	0	0
2018(loan)	→ Keighley Cougars	3	1	0	0	4
2018(loan)	→ Workington Town	14	3	0	0	12
2019	Rochdale Hornets	8	1	0	0	4
2019–20	Swinton Lions	6	1	0	0	4
2021	North Wales Crusaders	14	3	0	0	0
	Total	51	10	0	0	28
Representative
Years	Team	Pld	T	G	FG	P
2016–18	Wales	7	3	0	0	0
- Source: As of 22 February 2021 (UTC)

Ben Morris (born 1 August 1997) a Wales international rugby league footballer who last played as a second-row forward for the North Wales Crusaders in RFL League 1.

== Background ==
Ben Morris was born in Liverpool, Merseyside, England, he has Welsh ancestors, and eligible to play for Wales due to the grandparent rule.

== Playing career ==
Morris joined St Helens when he was 14. In 2016 he was part of their unbeaten Academy side. For 2017, he signed a 12-month contract with the Super League squad.

He made his début for Wales in the 2017 Rugby League World Cup qualifiers, scoring two tries against Italy.

He has spent time on loan at Oldham RLFC, Sheffield Eagles, Keighley Cougars and Workington Town.

=== North Wales Crusaders ===
On 31 August 2020 it was reported that he had signed for North Wales Crusaders in the RFL League 1.
