= Stuart Littler =

English rugby coach and former player

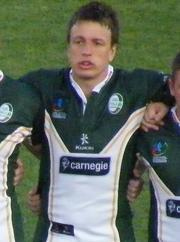

Personal information
- Born: 19 February 1979 (age 47) Higher End, Wigan, England

Playing information
- Height: 6 ft 3 in (1.91 m)
- Weight: 15 st 6 lb (98 kg)
- Position: Centre, Second-row
Club
Years	Team	Pld	T	G	FG	P
1998–10	Salford City Reds	329	113	0	0	452
2011–14	Leigh Centurions	101	32	0	0	128
2014	Rochdale Hornets	12	3	0	0	12
2015–16	Swinton Lions	55	24	0	0	96
	Total	497	172	0	0	688
Representative
Years	Team	Pld	T	G	FG	P
2004–16	Ireland	21	13	1	0	54

Coaching information
Club
Years	Team	Gms	W	D	L	W%
2017–21	Swinton Lions	60	10	2	41	17
2021–23	Oldham	0	0	0	0
	Total	60	10	2	41	17
Representative
Years	Team	Gms	W	D	L	W%
2018–22	Ireland	5	3	0	2	60

Stuart Littler (born 19 February 1979) is the former head coach of Oldham in RFL League 1. He is a former Ireland international rugby league footballer and a former head coach of Ireland.

Littler played for the Salford City Reds in the Super League, playing for his hometown club, Leigh Centurions and finishing his career with Swinton Lions, retiring at the end of the 2016 season.

Littler's position of choice was as a centre. He could also operate in the second-row and also played some games on the wing.

== Background ==
Littler was born in Higher End, Wigan, Greater Manchester, England. He is of Irish descent.

He is a lifelong resident of Leigh.

== Career ==
Littler is an Ireland international.

Littler was expected to leave the club following Salford's relegation to National League One. Littler was expected to seal a move to Harlequins RL, however Chairman Ian Lenagan decided not to offer him a deal.

Littler joined Salford in 1998 – his first professional club and is equal top-try scorer in a season for the club, alongside David Watkins.

He was named in the Ireland training squad for the 2008 Rugby League World Cup, and the Ireland squad for the 2008 Rugby League World Cup.

In October and November 2014, Stuart played in the 2014 European Cup competition.

In 2016, he was called up to the Ireland squad for the 2017 Rugby League World Cup European Pool B qualifiers.

== Coaching ==
=== Swinton Lions ===
After retiring with Swinton he remained with the club as an assistant coach under head coach John Duffy. When Duffy left the club in July 2017, he stepped into the head coach's shoes commencing with an away match at Bradford Bulls' Odsal Stadium on 23 July 2017. He parted company with Swinton in July 2021.

=== Oldham RLFC ===
On 6 October 2021, he was reported as the new head coach for Oldham RLFC.

On 1 Aug 2023 it was reported that Oldham had announced his departure amid speculation that he was about to take up the vacant Widnes Vikings head coach role.
