= Gil Dudson =

Wales international rugby league footballer

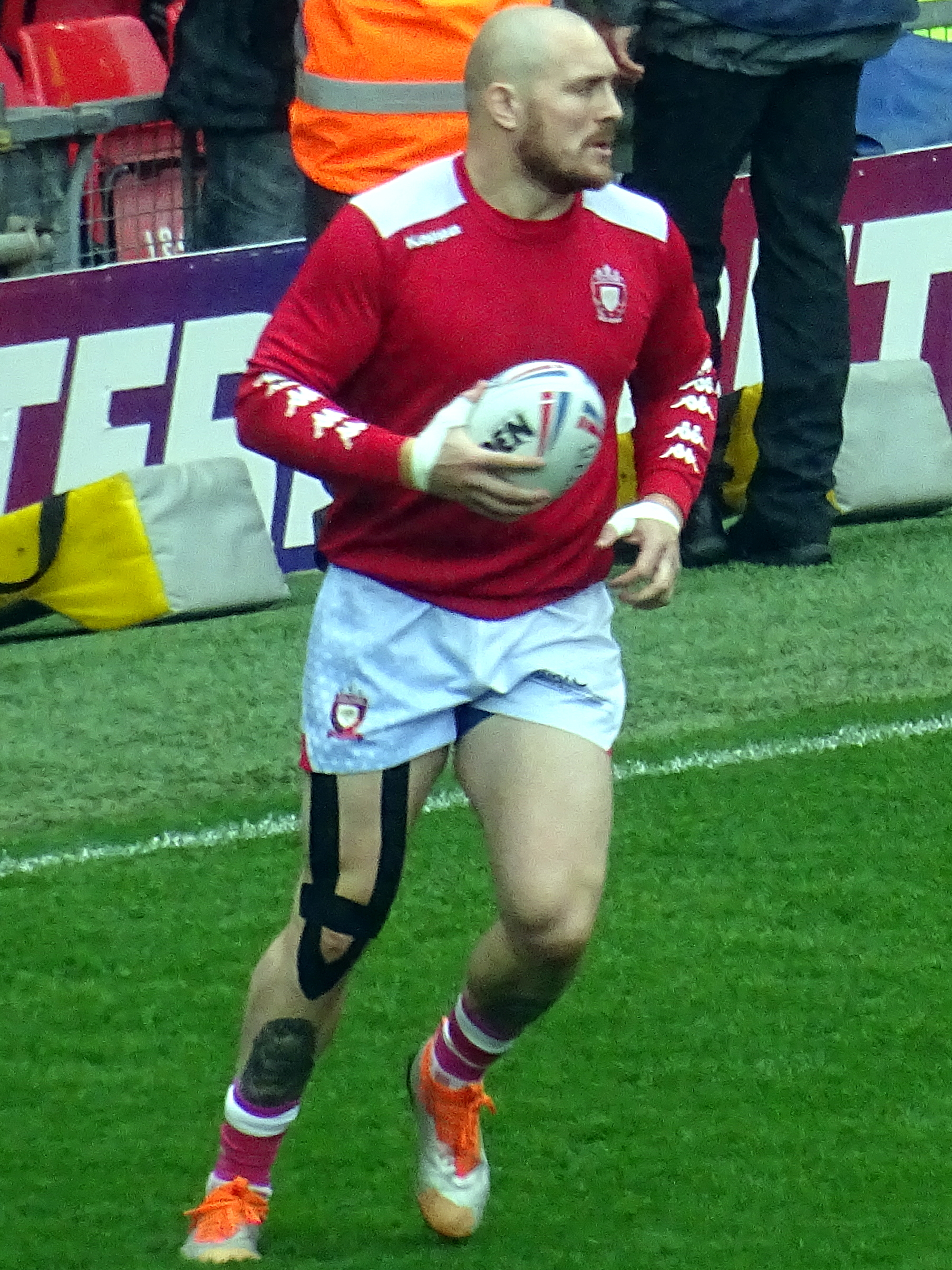

Personal information
- Full name: Gil Rees Dudson
- Born: 16 June 1990 (age 35) Trowbridge, Cardiff, Wales
- Height: 6 ft 2 in (1.88 m)
- Weight: 17 st 11 lb (113 kg)

Playing information
- Position: Prop
Club
Years	Team	Pld	T	G	FG	P
2009–11	Crusaders RL	13	0	0	0	0
2010(loan)	→ South Wales Scorpions	16	5	0	0	20
2012–14	Wigan Warriors	49	2	0	0	8
2015–18	Widnes Vikings	90	1	0	0	4
2019–20	Salford Red Devils	45	3	0	0	12
2021–22	Catalans Dragons	39	7	0	0	28
2023–24	Warrington Wolves	17	0	0	0	0
2024(loan)	→ Salford Red Devils	16	0	0	0	0
2025	Oldham RLFC	22	2	0	0	8
	Total	307	20	0	0	80
Representative
Years	Team	Pld	T	G	FG	P
2008–16	Wales	15	2	0	0	8
- Source: As of 29 January 2026

Gil Dudson (born 16 June 1990) is a Welsh professional rugby league footballer who plays as a prop for Oldham RLFC in the RFL Championship and Wales at international level.

He played for Crusaders RL in the Super League, and on loan from Crusaders at the South Wales Scorpions in Championship 1. Dudson has also played for the Wigan Warriors, Widnes Vikings, Salford Red Devils and the Catalans Dragons in the top flight.

== Background ==
Dudson was born in Trowbridge, Cardiff, Wales.

== Club career ==
=== Celtic Crusaders ===
Dudson began his career at Celtic Crusaders, where he progressed through the youth ranks. He made his Super League début in the 2009 season in a fixture against Leeds. Dudson spent 2010 on loan at South Wales Scorpions, and was named in the Championship 1 team of the year at the end of the season. He returned to Crusaders in 2011 and made 12 further appearances for the club. At the end of the season, he joined Wigan Warriors along with international team-mate Ben Flower.

=== Wigan Warriors ===
Dudson featured for Wigan in the 2013 Challenge Cup Final victory over Hull F.C. at Wembley Stadium.

He played in the 2013 Super League Grand Final victory over the Warrington Wolves at Old Trafford.

=== Widnes Vikings ===
In January 2015, he signed for Widnes Vikings for the 2015 seasons on a two-year deal.

=== Salford Red Devils ===
He played in the 2019 Super League Grand Final defeat by St. Helens at Old Trafford.

=== Catalans Dragons ===
On 18 December 2020, it was announced that Dudson would join the Catalans Dragons for the 2021 season on a two-year contract.

On 9 October 2021, Dudson played for Catalans in their 2021 Super League Grand Final defeat against St Helens.

In round 1 of the 2022 Super League season, Dudson was sent to the sin bin within the first minute of the game in Catalans 28–8 loss against St Helens.

=== Warrington Wolves ===
On 23 May 2022, Dudson signed a contract to join Warrington for the 2023 Super League season. In round 8 of the 2023 Super League season, Dudson was sent off in Warrington's 20–14 victory over Catalans Dragons after punching Tom Johnstone when he was lying on the ground. On 12 April 2023, Dudson was suspended for five matches over the incident.

=== Salford Red Devils (loan) ===
On 13 March 2024 it was reported that he had signed for Salford on loan for the remainder of the 2024 season.

=== Oldham RLFC ===
On 12 Sep 2024 it was reported that he had signed for Oldham RLFC in the RFL Championship on a 2-year deal.

== International honours ==
Dudson made his Wales début while at Celtic Crusaders in 2008.

Dudson has since been a regular for Wales, and featured in their 2011 Four Nations campaign.

Dudson played in all three of Wales' games in the 2013 Rugby League World Cup.

Dudson did not play for Wales again until October 2016, where he was part of the Cymru's 2017 World Cup qualifying campaign. Dudson scored a try in Wales' opening game against Serbia.
