= Dean Parata =

Italy international rugby league footballer

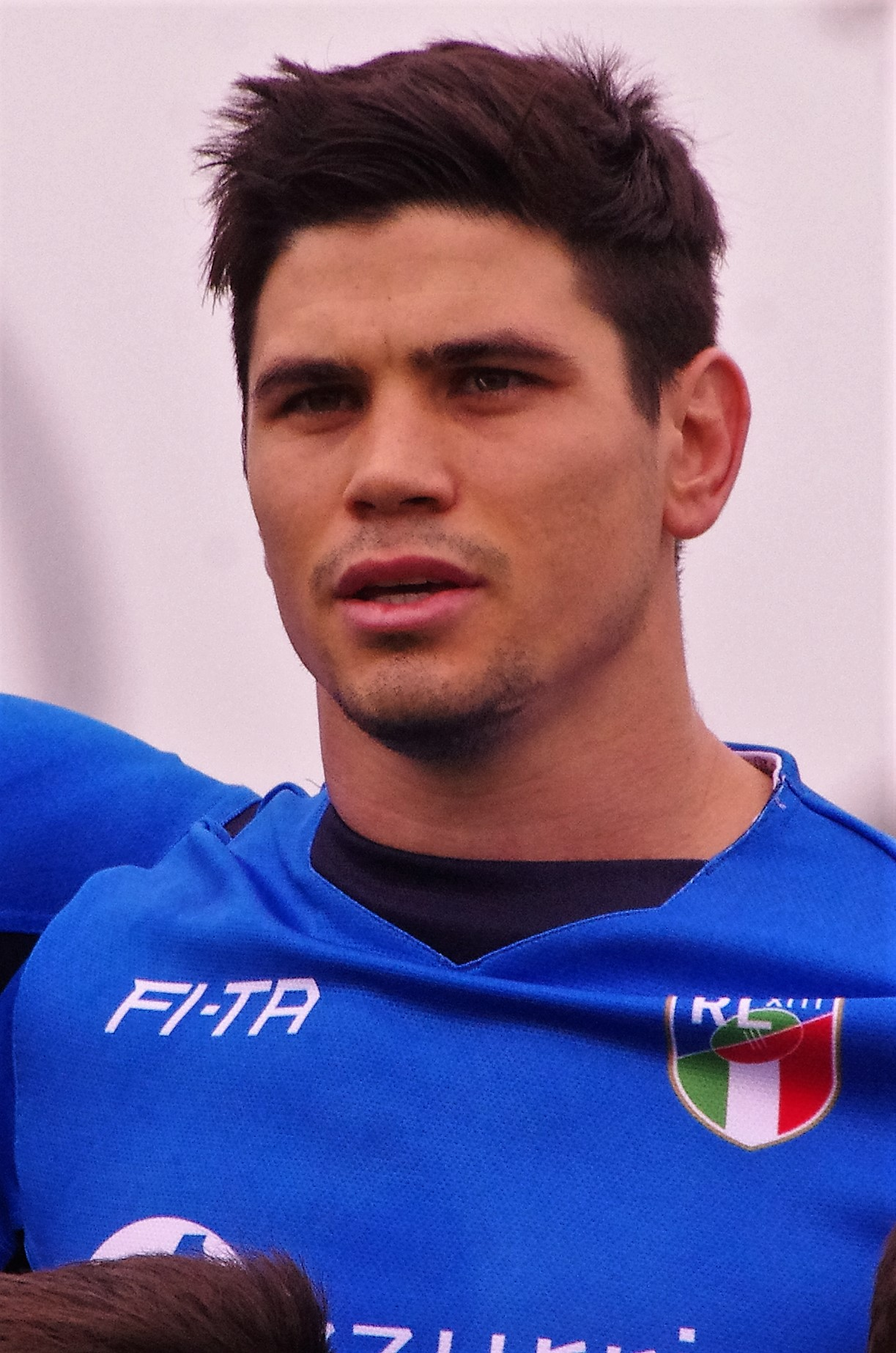

Personal information
- Full name: Dean Alexander Parata
- Born: 4 October 1991 (age 35) Sydney, New South Wales, Australia
- Height: 5 ft 9 in (1.76 m)
- Weight: 13 st 5 lb (85 kg)

Playing information
- Position: Hooker, Five-eighth
Club
Years	Team	Pld	T	G	FG	P
2018	Barrow Raiders	30	5	0	0	20
2019	Toulouse Olympique	27	7	0	0	28
2020–21	Featherstone Rovers	25	13	0	1	52
2022–24	London Broncos	74	16	0	0	64
	Total	156	41	0	1	164
Representative
Years	Team	Pld	T	G	FG	P
2013–22	Italy	10	1	0	0	4
- Source: As of 14 October 2026

Dean Parata (born 4 October 1991) is a former Italy international rugby league footballer who last played as a hooker for the London Broncos in the Super League.

Parata has previously played for the Barrow Raiders, Toulouse Olympique and Featherstone Rovers in the Championship.

== Background ==
Parata was born in Sydney, New South Wales, Australia.

== Early life ==
Of Italian descent, Parata attended Keebra Park State High School and played his junior rugby league for the Nerang Roosters in the Gold Coast, Queensland. After being signed by the Wests Tigers, he moved to Sydney and attended Holy Cross College, Ryde.

== Playing career ==
Parata played 25 games for the Tigers in the National Youth Competition between 2009 and 2011. At the time of his selection for the 2013 World Cup, Parata was playing for the Parramatta Eels' feeder team, the Wentworthville Magpies in the New South Wales Cup. He later joined the Blacktown Workers Sea Eagles in the same competition.

In the 2018 season, he signed for the Barrow Raiders in the Championship where he made 30 appearances for the club. In October 2018, Parata signed with Toulouse Olympique for the 2019 season. In October 2019, Parata joined Featherstone Rovers on a two-year contract, but with the suspension of the 2020 season due to the COVID-19 pandemic he returned to Australia. In the 2021 season, Featherstone reached the play-off final, but lost to Toulouse and missed out on promotion. The final was Parata's last game for Featherstone and in October 2021 he signed for London Broncos where he was appointed as vice-captain.

In the 2023 season, London earned promotion to the Super League with a 18–14 win over Featherstone in the Championship final. Parata was named (jointly with Lachlan Walmsley) as the Championship Player of the Year at the RFL annual awards. In October 2024, Parata announced his retirement from playing rugby league.

=== International ===
Parata was selected to represent Italy at the 2017 World Cup qualifying tournament in 2016. Parata was named as a shadow player for Italy at the 2017 World Cup.

He was selected to represent Italy at the 2022 postponed 2021 Rugby League World Cup. He started at hooker against Scotland and scored a try in the 28–4 win.
