= George King (rugby league) =

Ireland international rugby league footballer

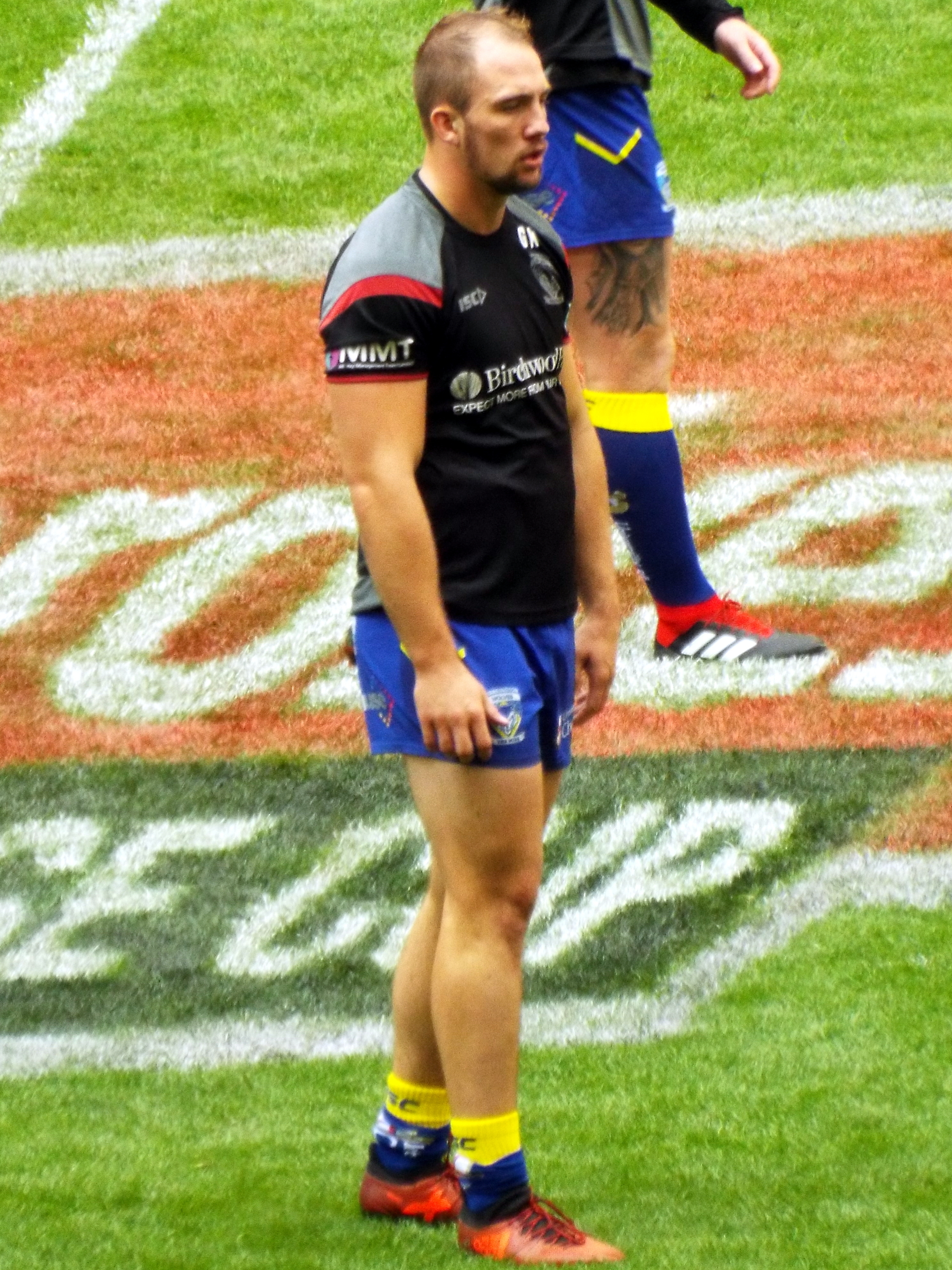

Personal information
- Full name: George Francis Noel King
- Born: 24 February 1995 (age 31) Huddersfield, West Yorkshire, England
- Height: 6 ft 3 in (1.91 m)
- Weight: 16 st 4 lb (103 kg)

Playing information
- Position: Loose forward, Prop
Club
Years	Team	Pld	T	G	FG	P
2014–18	Warrington Wolves	97	7	0	0	28
2015(loan)	→ N Wales Crusaders	5	2	0	0	8
2018(loan)	→ Rochdale Hornets	5	1	0	0	4
2019–20	Wakefield Trinity	29	0	0	0	0
2020–24	Hull Kingston Rovers	96	4	0	0	16
2025–	Huddersfield Giants	39	2	0	0	8
	Total	271	16	0	0	64
Representative
Years	Team	Pld	T	G	FG	P
2016–	Ireland	20	9	0	0	36
- Source: As of 13 November 2026
- Relatives: Toby King (brother)

George King (born 24 February 1995) is an Ireland international rugby league footballer who plays as a loose forward and prop for the Huddersfield Giants in the Super League.

He previously played for Wakefield Trinity and the Warrington Wolves in the Super League, and on loan from Warrington at the North Wales Crusaders in Championship 1 and the Rochdale Hornets in the Betfred Championship.

== Background ==
King was born in Huddersfield, West Yorkshire, England.

== Playing career ==
George is the older brother of Toby King: they both played their amateur rugby league at Meltham All Blacks, and George additionally played for Siddal. They were spotted by the Wires’ Yorkshire scout Tommy Gleeson after both appeared for Huddersfield.

In 2016 he was called up to the Ireland squad for the 2017 Rugby League World Cup European Pool B qualifiers.

=== Warrington Wolves ===
King was promoted to the Warrington Wolves first team squad in 2014. His Super League début was against the Bradford Bulls in June 2014.

He played in the 2016 Challenge Cup Final defeat by Hull F.C. at Wembley Stadium.

He played in the 2016 Super League Grand Final defeat by the Wigan Warriors at Old Trafford.

He played in the 2018 Challenge Cup Final defeat by the Catalans Dragons at Wembley Stadium.

He played in the 2018 Super League Grand Final defeat by the Wigan Warriors at Old Trafford.

=== Hull Kingston Rovers ===
In September 2020 the club web site announced the signing of King from Wakefield Trinity King played a total of 20 games for Hull KR in the 2021 Super League season including the club's 28-10 semi-final loss against the Catalans Dragons. On 12 August 2023, King played for Hull Kingston Rovers in their 17-16 golden point extra-time loss to Leigh in the Challenge Cup final. King played 27 games for Hull Kingston Rovers in the 2023 Super League season as the club finished fourth on the table and qualified for the playoffs. He played in the clubs semi-final loss against Wigan.

=== Huddersfield Giants ===
On 17 October 2024 it was reported that he had signed for Huddersfield in the Super League on a four-year deal. King played 18 matches for Huddersfield in the 2025 Super League season as the club finished 10th on the table.
