= Etuate Qionimacawa =

Fijian rugby league player

Personal information
- Full name: Etuate Tamanikaitai

Playing information
- Position: Wing, Stand-off
Club
Years	Team	Pld	T	G	FG	P
	Nadera Panthers
Representative
Years	Team	Pld	T	G	FG	P
2016–	Fiji	1	3	0	0	12

Etuate Tamanikaitai Qionimacawa is a Fijian rugby league player currently playing for the Nadera Panthers in the Fiji National Rugby League. He primarily plays on the Wing.

== Playing career ==
He made his international debut for Fiji in the 2016 Melanesian Cup against Papua New Guinea where he scored a hat-trick of tries.
