= Steve Parry (rugby league) =

Wales international rugby league footballer

Personal information
- Born: 19 October 1988 (age 37) Merthyr Tydfil, Wales
- Weight: 12 st 8 lb (80 kg)

Playing information
- Position: Stand-off, Hooker
Club
Years	Team	Pld	T	G	FG	P
2010–13	South Wales Scorpions	73	43	0	0	172
2013–17	Gloucestershire All Golds	48	30	1	0	122
2018–	West Wales Raiders	29	9	0	0	36
	Total	150	82	1	0	330
Representative
Years	Team	Pld	T	G	FG	P
2010–17	Wales	9	2	0	0	8

Steve Parry (born 19 October 1988) is a Welsh professional rugby league footballer who plays for the West Wales Raiders in League 1, and at representative level for Wales. He previously played at club level for the Cardiff Demons and the South Wales Scorpions as a stand-off or hooker.

== Club career ==
Steve started playing rugby league at Cardiff Demons as a junior. Steve Parry scored his first try for the South Wales Scorpions against Workington Town in the Scorpions first ever match. Parry, has since been a part of the Welsh Premier side Rhondda Outlaws. Playing an instrumental part in their 2022 season, and scoring tries in the 22–20 Grand Final win over Aberavon Fighting Irish at Stebonheath in Llanelli.

== International honours ==
Steve Parry won 3 caps for Wales while at South Wales Scorpions. He made more appearances for Wales in the 2015 European Cup tournament, a tournament which saw him score his first international try.

In October 2016, Steve played for Wales in the 2017 World Cup qualifiers.
