= Shannon Wakeman =

Italy international rugby league footballer

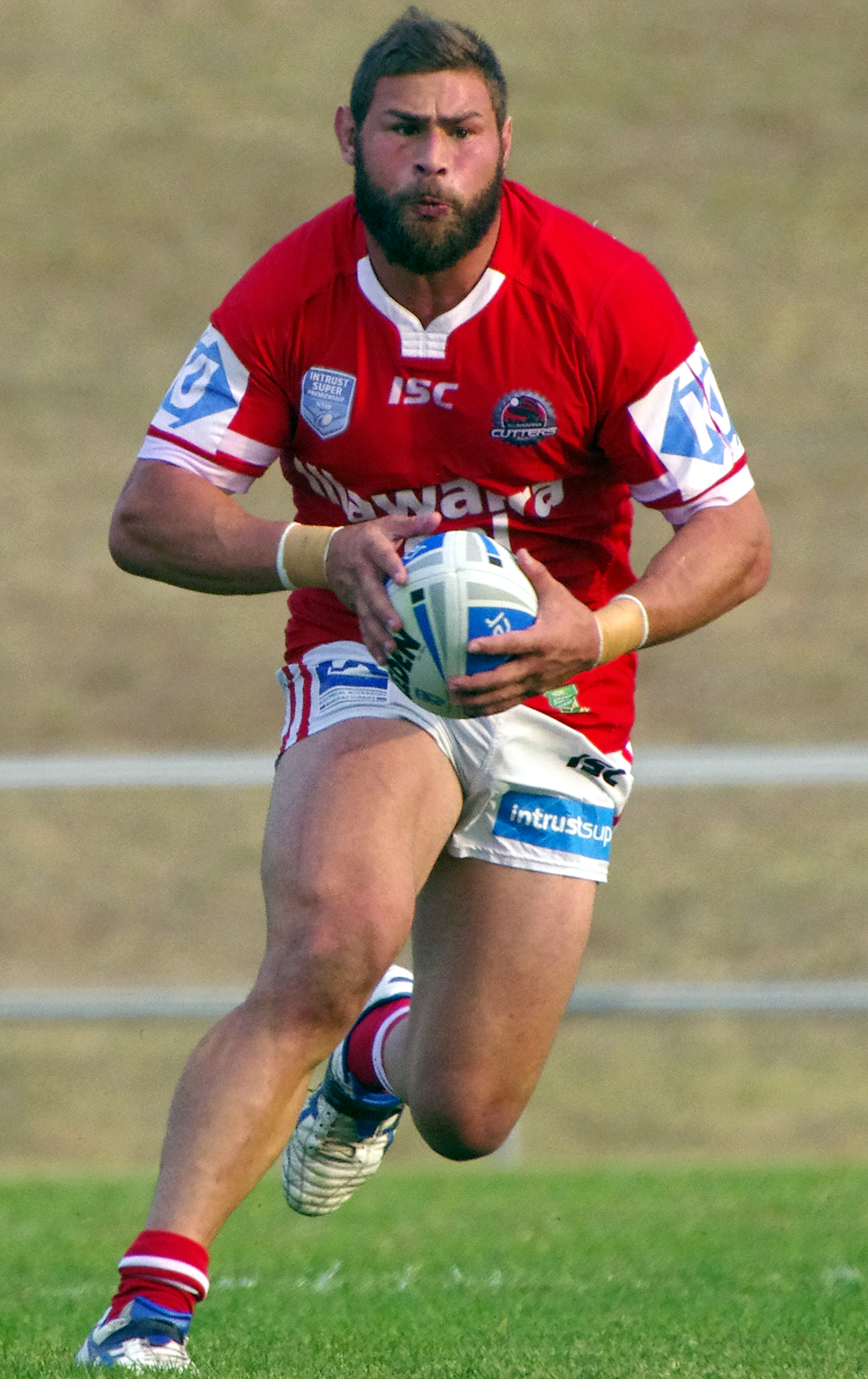

Personal information
- Born: 15 February 1990 (age 36) Dapto, New South Wales, Australia
- Height: 6 ft 1 in (1.85 m)
- Weight: 16 st 12 lb (107 kg)

Playing information
- Position: Prop
Club
Years	Team	Pld	T	G	FG	P
2017–18	Huddersfield Giants	30	3	0	0	12
2018(loan)	→ Dewsbury Rams	5	0	0	0	0
	Total	35	3	0	0	12
Representative
Years	Team	Pld	T	G	FG	P
2016	NSW Residents	1	0	0	0	0
2016–17	Italy	6	2	0	0	8
- Source: As of 10 January 2024

Shannon Wakeman (born 15 February 1990), also known by the nickname of TS Wakeman, is an Italy international rugby league footballer who last contracted to the Huddersfield Giants in the Super League. He plays as a prop.

== Italy ==
Wakeman is an Italy international due to having Italian Grandparents.

== Background ==
He played his junior rugby league for the Dapto Canaries. Wakeman played for the St George Illawarra Dragons NYC side for two seasons between 2009 and 2010.

In 2012 he played for the Windsor Wolves in the NSW Cup. He had been with the Penrith Panthers feeder club since 2011.

He then moved on to play for the Illawarra Cutters in the New South Wales Cup from 2013. Wakeman signed with the St. George Illawarra Dragons in the NRL, making the step up from feeder club to the elite level. Whilst he failed to make a first-grade appearance in the NRL, he did attract headlines for his performances for the Cutters in the Intrust Super Premiership. Wakeman was a member of Illawarra's 2016 premiership winning side and also a member and first try scorer of the Illawarra side which won the NRL State Championship match in 2016 against The Burleigh Bears.

== Super League Break ==
In late December 2016 he signed a two-year full-time contract to play for the Huddersfield Giants in the Super League. He was coached by former Newcastle Knights boss, Rick Stone.

== Controversy ==
In October 2017 while playing for Italy in the 2017 Rugby League World Cup, Wakeman allegedly king hit teammate James Tedesco while having drinks at The Pier Bar in Cairns following Italy's shock 36–12 defeat by Ireland. The altercation was reportedly due to a misunderstanding with Wakeman's girlfriend.
