= Christophe Calegari =

Italy rugby league footballer (born 1984)

Personal information
- Born: 3 June 1984 (age 41) France
- Height: 180 cm (5 ft 11 in)
- Weight: 88 kg (13 st 12 lb)

Playing information
- Position: Centre, Wing
Club
Years	Team	Pld	T	G	FG	P
2007–10	SM Pia XIII	50	29	0	0	116
2011–14	Lézignan Sangliers	45	19	0	0	76
2016–	Palau XIII Broncos	35	12	0	0	48
	Total	130	60	0	0	240
Representative
Years	Team	Pld	T	G	FG	P
2011–16	Italy	11	3	0	0	12
- Source: As of 16 January 2021

Christophe Calegari is a French rugby league footballer who represented Italy in the 2013 World Cup.

== Playing career ==
In 2013 he was playing for Lézignan Sangliers in the Elite One Championship at centre.

In 2016 he joined fellow Elite One Championship club Palau XIII Broncos.
