= Casey Dunne =

Ireland international rugby league footballer

Personal information
- Full name: Casey Patrick Dunne
- Born: 25 November 1984 (age 40); County Meath, Ireland
- Height: 5 ft 11 in (1.80 m)
- Weight: 14 st 13 lb (95 kg)

Playing information
- Position: Wing, Fullback, Scrum-half
Club
Years	Team	Pld	T	G	FG	P
	Longhorns RL
Representative
Years	Team	Pld	T	G	FG	P
2014–17	Ireland	13	12	1	0	10
- Source: As of 28 September 2016

Casey Dunne (born 25 November 1984) is an Irish professional rugby league footballer who plays as a winger or fullback for Longhorns RL in the ROI League and Ireland at international level.

Dunne has also won the Towns cup and all-Ireland cup with his rugby union club Ashbourne RFC along with intermediate and junior championships in GAA with his hometown club; Duleek/Bellewstown GAA.

Dunne is an Irish international. In 2016 he was called up to the Ireland squad for the 2017 Rugby League World Cup European qualifiers.

Dunne was named in the Ireland squad for the 2017 Rugby League World Cup.

Domestically he is player-coach for Longhorns RL, who he guided to All-Ireland champions in 2017.
