= Richard Lepori =

Italy international rugby league footballer

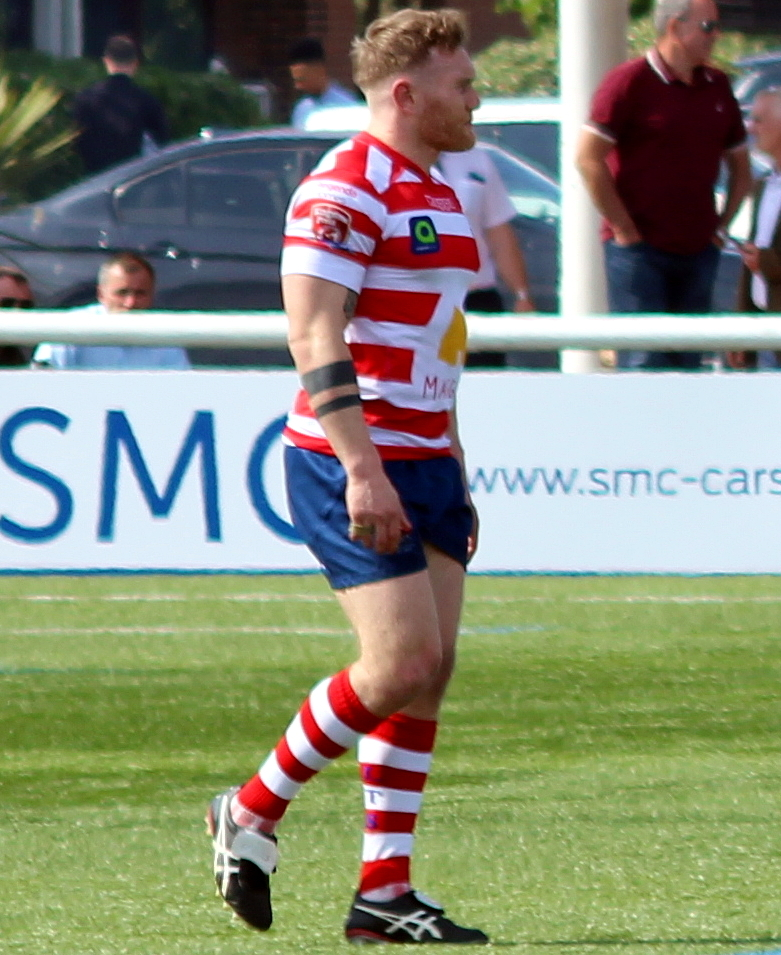

Personal information
- Born: 21 October 1991 (age 34) St Albans, Hertfordshire, England
- Height: 5 ft 8 in (1.73 m)
- Weight: 12 st 8 lb (80 kg)

Playing information

Rugby league
- Position: Fullback, Wing
Club
Years	Team	Pld	T	G	FG	P
2013	Oldham	22	13	0	0	52
2015	Whitehaven	13	2	0	0	8
2015–16	Oldham	30	7	1	0	30
2017	Oldham	38	21	0	0	84
2018–19	Rochdale Hornets	27	6	0	0	24
2019–	Swinton Lions	14	5	0	0	20
	Total	144	54	1	0	218
Representative
Years	Team	Pld	T	G	FG	P
2013–	Italy	13	12	0	0	48

Rugby union
- Position: Wing
Club
Years	Team	Pld	T	G	FG	P
2016–17	Sedgley Tigers	10	8	0	0	40
- Source: As of 24 October 2022

Richard Lepori (born 21 October 1991) is an Italy international rugby league footballer who plays as a fullback or winger for the Swinton Lions in the Championship.

He has previously played for Oldham, Whitehaven and the Rochdale Hornets.

== Background ==
Richard Lepori was born in St Albans, Hertfordshire, England. After the breakdown of his parents' marriage he moved with his mother to Chorley, Lancashire in 2001.

He attended Holy Cross RC High School where he was encouraged to play rugby, a sport he fell in love with.

His mother still lives in Chorley. He also has an older brother, Simon Lepori, who lives in Trafford, Greater Manchester, where he is a local councillor for the Liberal Democrats.

His half brother Dylan Lepori currently plays amateur rugby for Watford Rugby Club.

== Playing career ==
Lepori was previously contracted to play in the academy teams of Salford City Reds, and later Castleford Tigers. He joined Oldham in the third-tier Championship 1 in 2013, before moving to Queensland, Australia the following year, playing for the Atherton Roosters in the Cairns District Rugby League. On 23 October 2014, it was announced that Lepori would be returning to England in 2015 to join Whitehaven in the second-tier Championship. Lepori left the club in July 2015 after their signing of Louis Jouffret saw him receive no game time. He rejoined recently promoted Oldham in the Championship, before joining the Sedgley Tigers, a rugby union club, in the fourth-tier National League 2 North. Lepori once again rejoined Oldham midseason in March 2017. Lepori joined Rochdale Hornets in October 2017.
