= Courtney Davies =

Wales international rugby league footballer

Personal information
- Born: 1 July 1994 (age 32) Port Talbot, Wales
- Height: 5 ft 9 in (1.75 m)
- Weight: 12 st 13 lb (82 kg)

Playing information
- Position: Scrum-half, Stand-off
Club
Years	Team	Pld	T	G	FG	P
2012–13	South Wales Ironmen	17	2	21	0	50
2014	London Skolars	16	4	22	0	60
2015–16	Gloucestershire All Golds	22	8	25	0	82
2016–17	South Wales Ironmen	12	1	2	0	0
2017	Gloucestershire All Golds	5	0	11	0	22
	Total	72	15	81	0	214
Representative
Years	Team	Pld	T	G	FG	P
2015–17	Wales	10	3	19	0	50
- Source: As of 27 January 2018

Courtney Davies (born 1 July 1994) is a Welsh professional rugby league footballer who plays as a scrum-half or stand-off.

== Background ==
Davies was born in Port Talbot, Wales.

== Career ==
Davies is a Welsh international. In 2015, he made his international début in the opening European Cup game against Scotland.
