= Will Hope =

Ireland international rugby league footballer

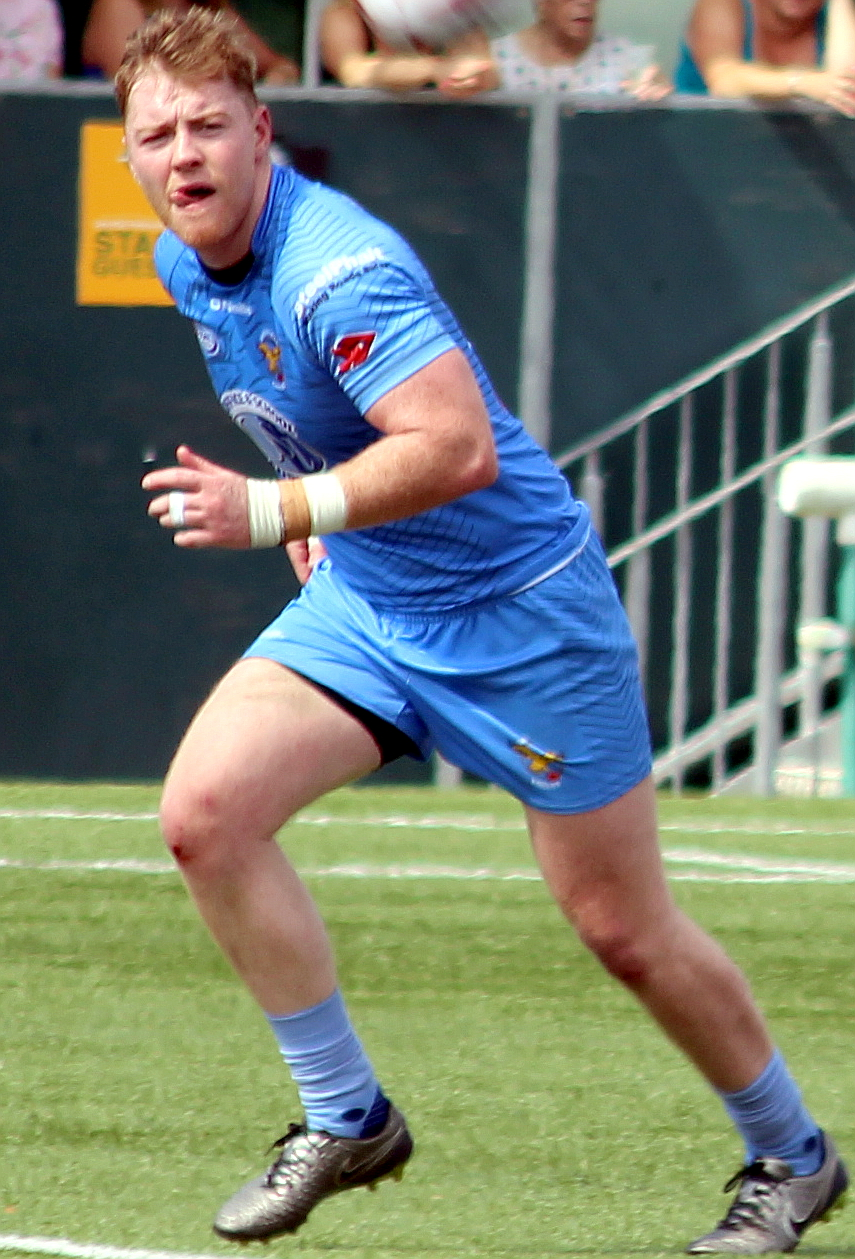

Personal information
- Full name: William Hope
- Born: 2 June 1993 (age 32)
- Height: 6 ft 2 in (1.88 m)
- Weight: 14 st 9 lb (93 kg)

Playing information
- Position: Second-row, Loose forward
Club
Years	Team	Pld	T	G	FG	P
2013	Salford City Reds	4	2	0	0	8
2013(loan)	→ Oldham	1	0	0	0	0
2014(loan)	→ Sheffield Eagles	11	1	0	0	4
2015–16	Oldham	25	5	0	0	20
2017	Sheffield Eagles	25	3	0	0	12
2018–	Swinton Lions	17	3	0	0	12
	Total	83	14	0	0	56
Representative
Years	Team	Pld	T	G	FG	P
2014–17	Ireland	9	3	0	0	12
- Source: As of 11 February 2018

William Hope (born 2 June 1993) is an Irish professional rugby league footballer who plays as a second row or loose forward for the Swinton Lions in the Championship and Ireland at international level.

In 2014, he was called up to the Ireland squad and has been ever present in the team. In 2016, he was called up to the Ireland squad for the 2017 Rugby League World Cup European Pool B qualifiers.

Hope has previously played for the Salford City Reds. He has also spent time on loan at the Sheffield Eagles and Oldham. He joined Oldham in 2015 and was released at the end of the 2016 season. He then signed for Sheffield in January 2017.

Hope was selected to travel with the Ireland squad for the 2017 World Cup, he only made one appearance but scored twice against Wales.
