= Jason Muranka =

Serbia international rugby league footballer

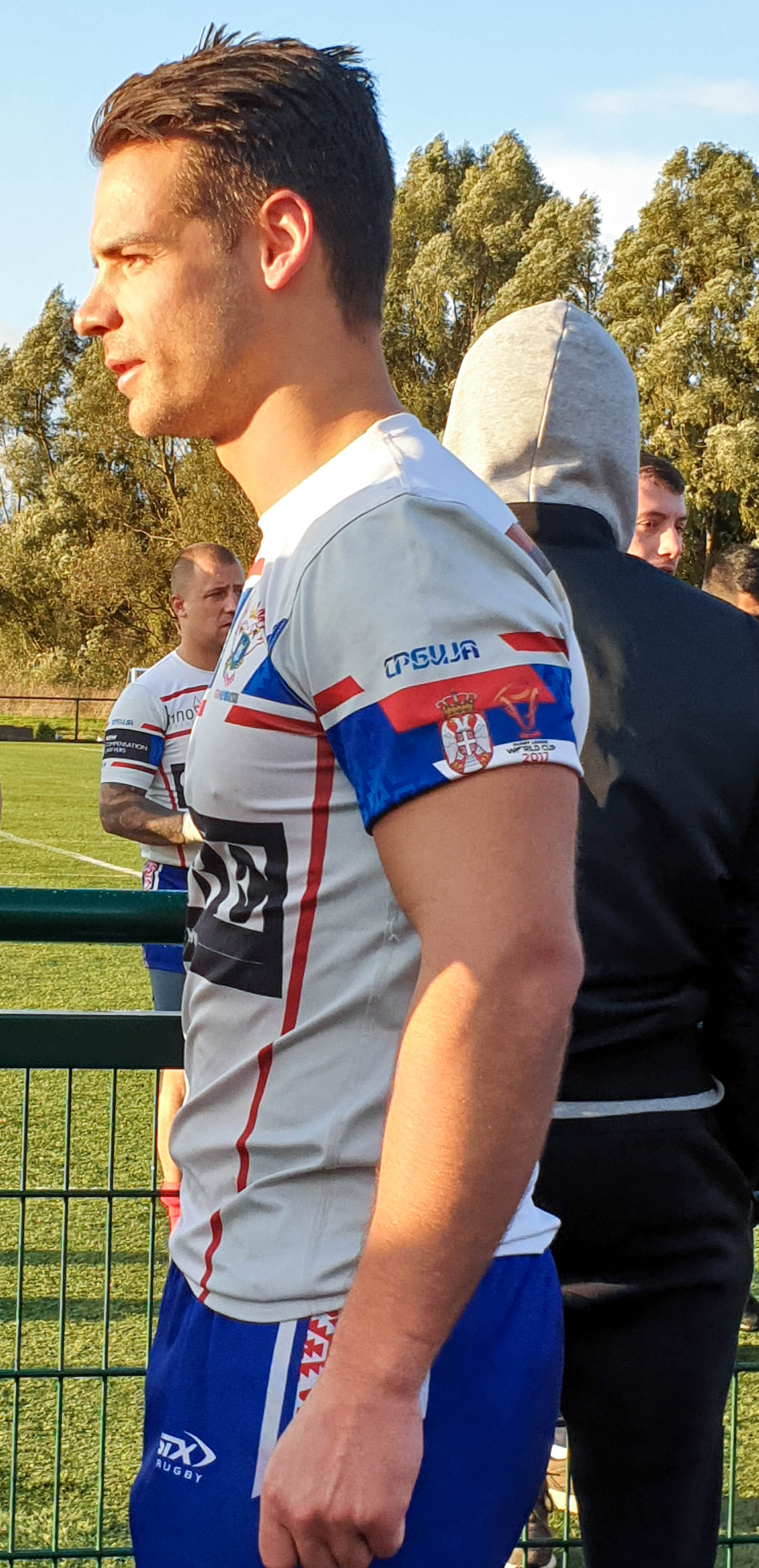
- Muranka representing Serbia in 2019

Personal information
- Full name: Jason Thomas Muranka
- Born: 4 August 1989 (age 36) Bradford, West Yorkshire

Playing information
- Position: Second-row
Club
Years	Team	Pld	T	G	FG	P
2014–16	Dewsbury Rams	15	0	0	0	0
2014(loan)	→ Gloucestershire All Golds	7	0	0	0	0
2016(loan)	→ Newcastle Thunder	1	0	0	0	0
2017–18	Doncaster	16	1	0	0	4
2019–21	Keighley Cougars	26	9	0	0	36
2022	Oldham R.L.F.C.	5	2	0	0	8
	Total	70	12	0	0	48
Representative
Years	Team	Pld	T	G	FG	P
2015–19	Serbia	9	1	0	0	4
- Source: As of 5 May 2024

Jason Thomas Muranka (Serbian: Џејсон Томас Муранка, romanized: Džejson Tomas Muranka; born 4 August 1989) is a Serbian international rugby league footballer who last played for Oldham RLFC in League 1. He plays as a second row. Of Serbian descent on his mother's side, Muranka has represented the Serbian White Eagles.

Muranka has previously played for the Dewsbury Rams, Doncaster and Keighley Cougars, and spent time on loan at the Gloucestershire All Golds and Newcastle Thunder.

== Oldham R.L.F.C. ==
On 4 Nov 2021 it was reported that he had signed for Oldham R.L.F.C. in the RFL League 1
