= 2021 Men's Rugby League World Cup Group B =

Group B of the 2021 Rugby League World Cup is one of four groups in the 2021 Rugby League World Cup, which will be played in 2022. The group comprises automatic qualifiers Australia and Fiji as well as Scotland and Italy, who both qualified through the 2019 European play-off tournament.

The pool draw was made on 16 January 2020. The fixtures were announced on 21 July 2020. A revised schedule was issued on 19 November 2021 following the postponement of the tournament from 2021 to 2022.

== Standings ==
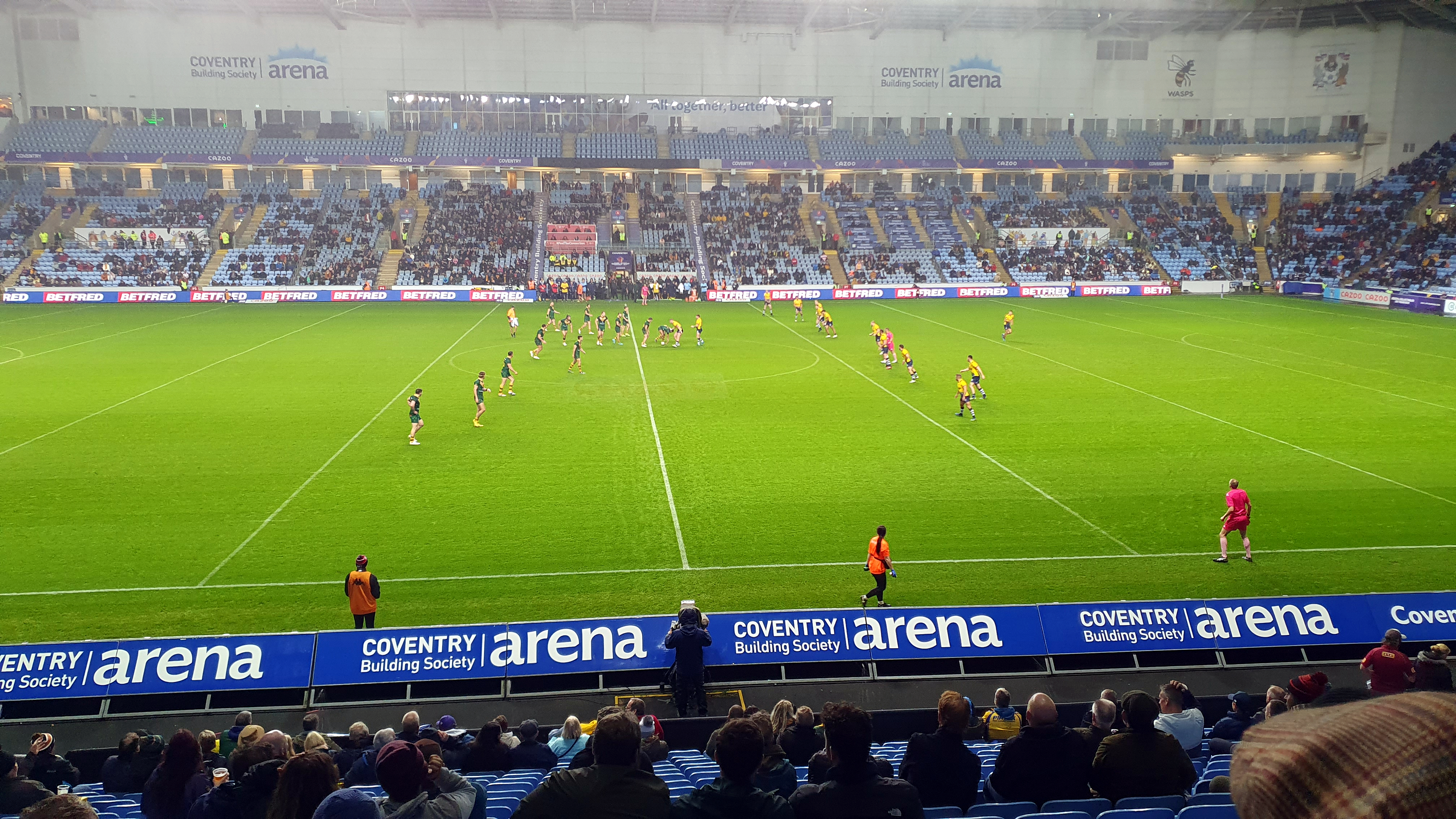
Australia vs Scotland at the Coventry Arena

Pos	Team	Pld	W	D	L	PF	PA	PD	Pts	Qualification
1	Australia	3	3	0	0	192	14	+178	6	Advance to knockout stage
2	Fiji	3	2	0	1	98	60	+38	4	Advance to knockout stage
3	Italy	3	1	0	2	38	130	−92	2	
4	Scotland	3	0	0	3	18	142	−124	0	

Source: rlwc2021

== Matches ==
=== Australia vs Fiji ===
15 October 2022
19:30 BST (UTC+01:00)

Australia	42–8	Fiji
Tries: Nanai 16'; Addo-Carr (2) 24', 68'; Crichton 35'; Mitchell 44'; Grant 54'; Tedesco 61'; Goals: Holmes (7/7) 16', 25', 36', 45', 54', 61', 68'	Report	Tries: Valemei 4'; Turuva 76'; Goals: Wakeham (0/2)

Headingley Stadium, Leeds
Attendance: 13,366
Referee: Chris Kendall (England)
Touch judges: Wyatt Raymond (Australia), Darian Furner (Australia)
Player of the Match: Cameron Munster (Australia)

Team details
Australia		Position	Fiji
Name	Number	Position	Number	Name
James Tedesco (c)	1	Fullback	1	Sunia Turuva
Josh Addo-Carr	9	Wing	5	Mitieli Vulikijapani
Latrell Mitchell	8	Centre	4	Kevin Naiqama (c)
Valentine Holmes	4	Centre	19	Semi Valemei
Murray Taulagi	23	Wing	2	Maika Sivo
Cameron Munster	7	Stand off/Five eighth	6	Sitiveni Moceidreke
Daly Cherry-Evans	2	Scrum half/Half back	7	Brandon Wakeham
Tino Fa'asuamaleaui	18	Prop forward	17	King Vuniyayawa
Ben Hunt	3	Hooker	9	Apisai Koroisau
Jake Trbojevic	5	Prop forward	13	Tui Kamikamica
Angus Crichton	17	Second row	12	Viliame Kikau
Jeremiah Nanai	22	Second row	22	Siua Wong
Cameron Murray	11	Loose forward/Lock forward	16	Lamar Manuel-Liolevave
Harry Grant	20	Interchange	14	Penioni Tagituimua
Reuben Cotter	16	Interchange	23	Jowasa Drodrolagi
Patrick Carrigan	13	Interchange	10	Ben Nakubuwai
Jack Wighton	17	Interchange	11	Taniela Sadrugu
Mal Meninga		Coach		Wise Kativerata
Rugby League Project

=== Scotland vs Italy ===
16 October 2022
14:30 BST (UTC+01:00)

Scotland	4–28	Italy
Tries: Walmsley 76'; Goals: Brierley (0/1)	Report	Tries: Polselli 10'; Parata 23'; Maizen (3) 44', 49', 74'; Goals: Campagnolo (4/5) 10', 23' 45', 74'

Kingston Park, Newcastle
Attendance: 6,206
Referee: Todd Smith (Australia)
Touch judges: Paki Parkinson (New Zealand), Marcus Griffiths (England)
Player of the Match: Nathan Brown (Italy)

Team details
Scotland		Position	Italy
Name	Number	Position	Number	Name
Ryan Brierley	7	Fullback	1	Luke Polselli
Matty Russell	2	Wing	2	Richard Lepori
Kieran Buchanan	4	Centre	3	Daniel Atkinson
Bayley Liu	23	Centre	4	Ethan Natoli
Lachlan Walmsley	5	Wing	5	Jake Maizen
Bailey Hayward	6	Stand off	6	Jack Campagnolo
Calum Gahan	19	Scrum half	7	Radean Robinson
Logan Bayliss-Brow	8	Prop forward	10	Anton Iaria
Liam Hood	9	Hooker	9	Dean Parata
Sam Luckley	10	Prop forward	15	Luca Moretti
Euan Aitken	11	Second row	11	Ryan King
Kane Linnett	12	Second row	12	Brenden Santi
James Bell	13	Loose forward	13	Nathan Brown
Ben Hellewell	3	Interchange	14	Joe Tramontana
Luke Bain	15	Interchange	15	Luke Hodge
Kyle Schneider	14	Interchange	16	Gioele Celerino
Dale Ferguson (yellow card) 37'	24	Interchange	17	Jack Colovatti
Rugby League Project

=== Australia vs Scotland ===
21 October 2022
19:30 BST (UTC+01:00)

Australia	84–0	Scotland
Tries: Addo-Carr (4) 6', 32', 49', 79'; Wighton (2) 11', 35'; Crichton 15'; Graham (3) 21', 59', 74'; Cleary 28'; Tedesco 41'; Hunt 44'; Burton 66'; Yeo 77'; Goals: Cleary (12/15) 12', 16', 23', 30', 34', 36', 42', 45', 50', 67', 75', 78'	Report

Coventry Building Society Arena, Coventry
Attendance: 10,276
Referee: Grant Atkins (Australia)
Touch judges: Kasey Badger (Australia), Warren Turley (England)
Player of the Match: Josh Addo-Carr (Australia)

Team details
Australia		Position	Scotland
Name	Number	Position	Number	Name
James Tedesco	1	Fullback	22	Alex Walker
Josh Addo-Carr	9	Wing	2	Matty Russell
Matt Burton	12	Centre	3	Ben Hellewell
Jack Wighton	10	Centre	4	Kieran Buchanan
Campbell Graham	19	Wing	5	Lachlan Walmsley
Cameron Munster	7	Stand off/Five eighth	19	Calum Gahan
Nathan Cleary	14	Scrum half/Half back	8	Bayley Howard
Reagan Campbell-Gillard	6	Prop forward	9	Logan Bayliss-Brow
Harry Grant	20	Hooker	18	Liam Hood
Patrick Carrigan	13	Prop forward	18	Jack Teanby
Angus Crichton	17	Second row	11	Euan Aitken
Liam Martin	21	Second row	12	Kane Linnett
Isaah Yeo	24	Loose forward/Lock forward	13	James Bell
Ben Hunt	3	Interchange	14	Kyle Schneider
Valentine Holmes	4	Interchange	15	Luke Bain
Jake Trbojevic	5	Interchange	16	Guy Graham
Lindsay Collins	15	Interchange	24	Dale Ferguson
Rugby League Project

=== Fiji vs Italy ===
22 October 2022
14:30 BST (UTC+01:00)

Fiji	60–4	Italy
Tries: Kikau (2) 9', 23'; Naiqama 12'; Tagituimua (2) 15', 46'; Koroisau 37'; Nakubuwai 51'; Sivo (2) 53', 63'; Sadrugu 79'; Goals: Wakeham (7/7) 10', 13', 17', 25', 38', 47', 51'; Koroisau (2/2) 55', 65'; Raiwalui (1/1) 80'	Report	Tries: Maizen 56'; Goals: Campagnolo (0/1)

Kingston Park, Newcastle
Attendance: 3,675
Referee: Jack Smith (England)
Touch judges: Darian Furner (Australia), James Vella (England)
Player of the Match: Penioni Tagituimua (Fiji)

Team details
Fiji		Position	Italy
Name	Number	Position	Number	Name
Sunia Turuva	1	Fullback	1	Luke Polselli
Vuate Karawalevu	24	Wing	2	Richard Lepori
Kevin Naiqama	4	Centre	4	Ethan Natoli
Semi Valemei	19	Centre	3	Daniel Atkinson
Maika Sivo	2	Wing	5	Jake Maizen
Apisai Koroisau	9	Stand off/Five eighth	6	Jack Campagnolo
Brandon Wakeham	7	Scrum half/Half back	7	Radean Robinson
King Vuniyayawa	17	Prop forward	8	Alec Susino
Penioni Tagituimua	14	Hooker	9	Dean Parata
Tui Kamikamica	13	Prop forward	10	Anton Iaria
Siua Wong	22	Second row	11	Ryan King
Viliame Kikau	12	Second row	12	Brenden Santi
Korbin Sims	3	Loose forward/Lock forward	13	Nathan Brown
Lamar Manuel-Liolevave	16	Interchange	14	Joe Tramontana
Ben Nakubuwai	10	Interchange	15	Luca Moretti
Taniela Sadrugu	11	Interchange	20	Jack Colovatti
Henry Raiwalui	20	Interchange	19	Luke Hodge
Rugby League Project

=== Fiji vs Scotland ===
29 October 2022
17:00 BST (UTC+01:00)

Fiji	30–14	Scotland
Tries: Sadrugu 6'; Kikau 15'; Raiwalui 36'; Sivo 46'; Sims 67'; Goals: Wakeham (5/5) 7', 16', 37', 48', 68'	Report	Tries: Walmsley 21'; Hellewell 40'; Liu 51'; Goals: Schneider (1/3) 63'

Kingston Park, Newcastle
Attendance: 6,736
Referee: Tom Grant (England)
Touch judges: James Child (England), Chris Kendall (England)
Player of the Match: Sunia Turuva (Fiji)

Team details
Fiji		Position	Scotland
Name	Number	Position	Number	Name
Sunia Turuva	1	Fullback	1	Davey Dixon
Vuate Karawalevu	2	Wing	2	Lachlan Walmsley
Kevin Naiqama	3	Centre	3	Bayley Liu
Semi Valemei	4	Centre	4	Kieran Buchanan
Maika Sivo	5	Wing	5	Matty Russell
Henry Raiwalui	6	Stand off/Five eighth	6	James Bell
Brandon Wakeham	7	Scrum half/Half back	7	Calum Gahan
King Vuniyayawa	8	Prop forward	8	Jack Teanby
Apisai Koroisau	9	Hooker	9	Kyle Schneider
Korbin Sims	10	Prop forward	10	Sam Luckley
Viliame Kikau	11	Second row	11	Ben Hellewell
Siua Wong	12	Second row	12	Kane Linnett
Taniela Sadrugu	13	Loose forward/Lock forward	13	Luke Bain
Penioni Tagituimua	14	Interchange	14	Logan Bayliss-Brow
Tevita Toloi	15	Interchange	15	Guy Graham
Joseph Ratuvakacereivalu	16	Interchange	16	Dale Ferguson
Lamar Manuel-Liolevave	17	Interchange	17	Charlie Emslie
Netane Masima	18	Concussion substitute	18	Shane Toal
Rugby League Project

=== Australia vs Italy ===
29 October 2022
19:30 BST (UTC+01:00)

Australia	66–6	Italy
Tries: Holmes 7'; Taulagi (2) 14', 40'; Tedesco 19'; Graham (2) 28', 68'; Mitchell 36'; Yeo 46'; Martin 51'; Murray 58'; Nanai 74'; Collins 80'; Goals: Cleary (9/12) 20', 30', 38', 48', 52', 60', 69', 76', 80'	Report	Tries: Palumbo 54'; Goals: Campagnolo (1/1) 55'

Totally Wicked Stadium, St Helens
Attendance: 5,586
Referee: Liam Moore (England)
Touch judges: Michael Smaill (England), Jack Smith (England)
Player of the Match: Jeremiah Nanai (Australia)

Team details
Australia		Position	Italy
Name	Number	Position	Number	Name
James Tedesco	1	Fullback	1	Luke Polselli
Campbell Graham	18	Wing	18	Kyle Pickering
Valentine Holmes	4	Centre	3	Daniel Atkinson
Latrell Mitchell	8	Centre	4	Ethan Natoli
Murray Taulagi	23	Wing	5	Jake Maizen
Daly Cherry-Evans	2	Stand off/Five eighth	6	Jack Campagnolo
Nathan Cleary	14	Scrum half/Half back	7	Radean Robinson
Lindsay Collins	15	Prop forward	8	Alec Susino
Ben Hunt	3	Hooker	9	Dean Parata
Reuben Cotter	16	Prop forward	10	Anton Iaria
Liam Martin	21	Second row	15	Luca Moretti
Jeremiah Nanai	22	Second row	12	Brenden Santi
Cameron Murray	11	Loose forward/Lock forward	13	Nathan Brown
Isaah Yeo	24	Interchange	14	Joe Tramontana
Tino Fa'asuamaleaui	18	Interchange	17	Ronny Palumbo
Reagan Campbell-Gillard	6	Interchange	20	Jack Colovatti
Matt Burton	12	Interchange	16	Gioele Celerino
Mal Meninga		Coach		Leo Epifania
Rugby League Project
