= List of Italy national rugby league team players =

The Italy national rugby league team represents the country of Italy in international rugby league. Governed by the Federazione Italiana Rugby League (FIRL) since 2008, only official matches played under International Rugby League laws since that year are included. Friendly matches and matches played by the Australian-based FIRL side are not counted.

Prior to 2008 when the FIRL was first recognised by the European Rugby League, the Italian national team was governed by the Italian Federation of Amateur Rugby 13 in the 1950s and 1960s, and the Australian-based Italia Rugby League in the 1990s and early 2000s.

== Players ==
| Name | Years | Games | Tries | Goals | FGs | Points | Date of debut | Opposition |
|---|---|---|---|---|---|---|---|---|
| Giancoma Alfonsi | 2012 | 1 | 1 | 0 | 0 | 4 | 7 July 2012 | Germany |
| Daniel Alvaro | 2017 | 3 | 0 | 0 | 0 | 0 | 29 October 2017 | Ireland |
| Luca Ameglio | 2014–15 | 4 | 1 | 0 | 0 | 4 | 5 July 2014 | Ukraine |
| Stefano Amura | 2014–15 | 5 | 0 | 0 | 0 | 0 | 26 July 2014 | Russia |
| Giordano Arena | 2023 | 1 | 0 | 0 | 0 | 0 | 27 May 2023 | Serbia |
| Cyril Armani | 2009 | 2 | 3 | 0 | 0 | 12 | 11 July 2009 | Czech Republic |
| Antonio Arrigo | 2016 | 1 | 2 | 1 | 0 | 10 | 12 June 2016 | Lebanon |
| Daniel Atkinson | 2022–23 | 5 | 1 | 8 | 0 | 20 | 16 October 2022 | Scotland |
| Nourou Bance | 2012 | 1 | 0 | 0 | 0 | 0 | 7 July 2012 | Germany |
| Ivan Barani | 2012–13 | 5 | 3 | 0 | 0 | 12 | 9 June 2012 | Serbia |
| Angelo Baruffi | 2014 | 1 | 0 | 0 | 0 | 0 | 20 September 2014 | Serbia |
| Christian Bate | 2017 | 1 | 0 | 0 | 0 | 0 | 8 October 2017 | Malta |
| Santino Battagliolo | 2019 | 1 | 0 | 0 | 0 | 0 | 19 October 2019 | Philippines |
| Nicola Bellotti | 2015 | 2 | 3 | 0 | 0 | 12 | 18 July 2015 | Ukraine |
| Mirco Bergamasco | 2016–17 | 5 | 0 | 24 | 0 | 48 | 22 October 2016 | Serbia |
| Samuele Bertolini | 2024 | 1 | 0 | 0 | 0 | 0 | 28 September 2024 | Malta |
| Fabio Berzieri | 2008–12 | 5 | 0 | 0 | 0 | 0 | 13 June 2008 | Germany |
| Dominic Biondi | 2018–25 | 6 | 2 | 0 | 0 | 8 | 12 October 2018 | South Africa |
| Matt Bonanno | 2018–23 | 4 | 0 | 0 | 0 | 0 | 12 October 2018 | South Africa |
| Fabio Borina | 2017 | 1 | 1 | 0 | 0 | 4 | 3 June 2017 | Lebanon |
| James Borges | 2025 | 1 | 0 | 0 | 0 | 0 | 4 October 2025 | Lebanon |
| Simone Boscolo | 2013–24 | 12 | 5 | 0 | 0 | 20 | 27 July 2013 | Germany |
| Matt Bradley | 2013–14 | 2 | 1 | 11 | 0 | 26 | 27 July 2013 | Germany |
| Nicola Bressanin | 2008 | 2 | 0 | 0 | 0 | 0 | 13 June 2008 | Germany |
| Greg Brincat | 2009 | 2 | 0 | 0 | 0 | 0 | 17 October 2009 | Scotland |
| Nathan Brown | 2017–22 | 6 | 0 | 0 | 0 | 0 | 29 October 2017 | Ireland |
| Lucas Bruzzone | 2017 | 1 | 1 | 0 | 0 | 4 | 10 June 2017 | Spain |
| Emiliano Buraschi | 2023–24 | 2 | 0 | 0 | 0 | 0 | 27 May 2023 | Serbia |
| Ismail Byaoui | 2017 | 2 | 0 | 0 | 0 | 0 | 3 June 2017 | Lebanon |
| Christophe Calegari | 2011–17 | 11 | 3 | 0 | 0 | 12 | 16 October 2011 | Russia |
| Jack Campagnolo | 2017–22 | 6 | 2 | 10 | 0 | 28 | 8 October 2017 | Malta |
| Terry Campese | 2016–18 | 5 | 2 | 13 | 0 | 34 | 22 October 2016 | Serbia |
| Nicola Cannato | 2024 | 1 | 0 | 0 | 0 | 0 | 28 September 2024 | Malta |
| Aaron Carbonaro | 2025 | 1 | 0 | 0 | 0 | 0 | 4 October 2025 | Lebanon |
| Jayden Carbonaro | 2025 | 1 | 0 | 0 | 0 | 0 | 4 October 2025 | Lebanon |
| Stefano Cardella | 2012 | 3 | 2 | 0 | 0 | 8 | 9 June 2012 | Serbia |
| Justin Castellaro | 2016–17 | 5 | 4 | 0 | 0 | 16 | 22 October 2016 | Serbia |
| Salvatore Catania | 2016 | 1 | 0 | 0 | 0 | 0 | 12 June 2016 | Lebanon |
| Gioele Celerino | 2013–23 | 22 | 10 | 1 | 0 | 42 | 29 June 2013 | Russia |
| Chris Centrone | 2013–18 | 8 | 3 | 0 | 0 | 12 | 26 October 2013 | Wales |
| Pierangelo Ceretti | 2013–15 | 7 | 0 | 0 | 0 | 0 | 29 June 2013 | Russia |
| Mason Cerruto | 2016–17 | 6 | 7 | 0 | 0 | 28 | 22 October 2016 | Serbia |
| Luca Cerza | 2012 | 1 | 0 | 0 | 0 | 0 | 9 June 2012 | Serbia |
| Fabrizio Ciaurro | 2011–17 | 10 | 5 | 0 | 0 | 20 | 23 October 2011 | Serbia |
| Manuele Cipriani | 2009 | 1 | 0 | 0 | 0 | 0 | 17 October 2009 | Scotland |
| Cameron Ciraldo | 2011–13 | 6 | 2 | 0 | 0 | 8 | 16 October 2011 | Russia |
| Giacomo Civino | 2024 | 1 | 0 | 0 | 0 | 0 | 28 September 2024 | Malta |
| Davide Colla | 2023–25 | 4 | 0 | 0 | 0 | 0 | 27 May 2023 | Serbia |
| Jack Colovatti | 2022–23 | 4 | 1 | 0 | 0 | 4 | 16 October 2022 | Scotland |
| Alessandro Corte | 2023–25 | 4 | 0 | 5 | 0 | 10 | 27 May 2023 | Serbia |
| Matthew Craparotta | 2023 | 2 | 1 | 0 | 0 | 4 | 7 October 2023 | Malta |
| Ricardo Crocella | 2023 | 1 | 0 | 0 | 0 | 0 | 27 May 2023 | Serbia |
| Anthony Curcio | 2018 | 2 | 0 | 0 | 0 | 0 | 12 October 2018 | South Africa |
| Alessio Curione | 2014 | 2 | 2 | 0 | 0 | 8 | 26 July 2014 | Russia |
| Carlo De Carli | 2017 | 1 | 1 | 0 | 0 | 4 | 10 June 2017 | Spain |
| Chris De Meyer | 2012–15 | 10 | 3 | 4 | 0 | 20 | 9 June 2012 | Serbia |
| Noah De Molan | 2025 | 1 | 0 | 0 | 0 | 0 | 4 October 2025 | Lebanon |
| Daniel De Vecchis | 2019 | 1 | 0 | 0 | 0 | 0 | 19 October 2019 | Philippines |
| Santino Decaro | 2015 | 2 | 1 | 0 | 0 | 4 | 18 July 2015 | Ukraine |
| Diego Del Nevo | 2014–15 | 3 | 0 | 0 | 0 | 0 | 5 July 2014 | Ukraine |
| Raffaele Della Ragione | 2014 | 1 | 3 | 0 | 0 | 12 | 5 July 2014 | Ukraine |
| Fabio Di Pietro | 2009 | 1 | 0 | 0 | 0 | 0 | 24 October 2009 | Lebanon |
| Francesco Di Trapani | 2016–17 | 3 | 3 | 0 | 0 | 12 | 12 June 2016 | Lebanon |
| Catalin Diac | 2015–16 | 2 | 2 | 0 | 0 | 8 | 20 June 2015 | Serbia |
| Robert Di-Leva | 2009 | 2 | 0 | 0 | 0 | 0 | 17 October 2009 | Scotland |
| Marco Dimaggio | 2009 | 2 | 0 | 0 | 0 | 0 | 11 July 2009 | Czech Republic |
| Riccardo Dodi | 2016 | 1 | 0 | 0 | 0 | 0 | 12 June 2016 | Lebanon |
| Samuel Dolores | 2018–19 | 5 | 1 | 0 | 0 | 4 | 12 October 2018 | South Africa |
| Jason Dubas-Fisher | 2008–09 | 6 | 2 | 0 | 0 | 8 | 12 July 2008 | Czech Republic |
| Idammou El Mehdi | 2013–15 | 3 | 2 | 0 | 0 | 8 | 27 July 2013 | Germany |
| Enrico Escante | 2008 | 1 | 0 | 0 | 0 | 0 | 12 July 2008 | Czech Republic |
| Dario Esposito | 2012–15 | 3 | 1 | 0 | 0 | 4 | 8 September 2012 | Russia |
| Mario Faccia | 2008 | 1 | 0 | 0 | 0 | 0 | 13 June 2008 | Germany |
| Riccardo Faccia | 2008 | 1 | 0 | 0 | 0 | 0 | 12 July 2008 | Czech Republic |
| Nicolino Facco | 2008–09 | 4 | 3 | 0 | 0 | 12 | 13 June 2008 | Germany |
| Kevin Fadini | 2023 | 1 | 0 | 0 | 0 | 0 | 27 May 2023 | Serbia |
| Ben Falcone | 2009–13 | 6 | 6 | 0 | 0 | 24 | 8 November 2009 | Serbia |
| Zac Farrugia | 2025 | 1 | 0 | 0 | 0 | 0 | 4 October 2025 | Lebanon |
| Marzio Ferraro | 2009 | 2 | 0 | 0 | 0 | 0 | 11 July 2009 | Czech Republic |
| Marco Ferrazzano | 2008–09 | 7 | 9 | 0 | 0 | 36 | 13 June 2008 | Germany |
| Vincent Fochesato | 2025 | 1 | 0 | 0 | 0 | 0 | 25 October 2025 | Greece |
| Remi Fontana | 2009–15 | 11 | 3 | 17 | 0 | 46 | 18 July 2009 | Germany |
| Marco Forno | 2024 | 1 | 0 | 0 | 0 | 0 | 28 September 2024 | Malta |
| Giovanni Franchi | 2008–14 | 9 | 6 | 0 | 0 | 24 | 13 June 2008 | Germany |
| Tiziano Franchini | 2008–15 | 4 | 0 | 0 | 0 | 0 | 13 June 2008 | Germany |
| Fabio Galetto | 2023 | 1 | 0 | 0 | 0 | 0 | 27 May 2023 | Serbia |
| Andrea Gallinaro | 2025 | 1 | 0 | 0 | 0 | 0 | 18 October 2025 | Ukraine |
| Sam Gardel | 2013 | 1 | 0 | 0 | 0 | 0 | 26 October 2013 | Wales |
| Gus Garzaniti | 2019 | 3 | 0 | 0 | 0 | 0 | 12 October 2019 | Malta |
| Andrea Gazzoli | 2014–15 | 2 | 1 | 0 | 0 | 4 | 20 September 2014 | Serbia |
| Pierluigi Gentile | 2009 | 3 | 0 | 0 | 0 | 0 | 17 October 2009 | Scotland |
| Ryan Ghietti | 2011–17 | 12 | 3 | 0 | 1 | 13 | 16 October 2011 | Russia |
| Elio Giacoma | 2014 | 1 | 0 | 0 | 0 | 0 | 20 September 2014 | Serbia |
| Igor Giammaro | 2016–17 | 2 | 0 | 0 | 0 | 0 | 12 June 2016 | Lebanon |
| Christian Gigliodoro | 2009 | 1 | 0 | 0 | 0 | 0 | 11 July 2009 | Czech Republic |
| Jaume Giorgis | 2016–17 | 4 | 2 | 0 | 0 | 8 | 12 June 2016 | Lebanon |
| Stefano Godoleshi | 2024 | 1 | 0 | 0 | 0 | 0 | 28 September 2024 | Malta |
| John Graso | 2009 | 3 | 0 | 0 | 0 | 0 | 17 October 2009 | Scotland |
| Dallas Greco | 2018 | 2 | 0 | 0 | 0 | 0 | 12 October 2018 | South Africa |
| Aidan Guerra | 2013 | 3 | 2 | 0 | 0 | 8 | 26 October 2013 | Wales |
| Gavin Hiscox | 2016 | 3 | 0 | 0 | 0 | 0 | 22 October 2016 | Serbia |
| Achraf Hliwa | 2016–17 | 2 | 0 | 0 | 0 | 0 | 12 June 2016 | Lebanon |
| Luke Hodge | 2018–23 | 7 | 0 | 0 | 0 | 0 | 27 October 2018 | Niue |
| Anton Iaria | 2017–23 | 9 | 2 | 0 | 0 | 8 | 8 October 2017 | Malta |
| Mason Iaria | 2023 | 2 | 1 | 0 | 0 | 4 | 7 October 2023 | Malta |
| Octavian Ilinca | 2012–15 | 3 | 2 | 0 | 0 | 8 | 9 June 2012 | Serbia |
| Andrea Jacotti | 2014 | 1 | 0 | 0 | 0 | 0 | 26 July 2014 | Russia |
| Jack Johns | 2017 | 1 | 0 | 0 | 0 | 0 | 29 October 2017 | Ireland |
| Andrew Kaleopa | 2008 | 1 | 2 | 1 | 0 | 10 | 13 June 2008 | Germany |
| Ryan King | 2019–22 | 6 | 1 | 0 | 0 | 4 | 12 October 2019 | Malta |
| Anthony Laffranchi | 2013 | 3 | 0 | 0 | 0 | 0 | 26 October 2013 | Wales |
| Omar Lai | 2024 | 1 | 0 | 0 | 0 | 0 | 28 September 2024 | Malta |
| Rhys Lenarduzzi | 2011–12 | 4 | 4 | 0 | 0 | 16 | 16 October 2011 | Russia |
| Nic Lenaz | 2023–25 | 5 | 2 | 0 | 0 | 84 | 7 October 2023 | Malta |
| Jackson Lenzo | 2025 | 3 | 3 | 0 | 0 | 12 | 4 October 2025 | Lebanon |
| Richard Lepori | 2013–22 | 13 | 12 | 0 | 0 | 48 | 27 July 2013 | Germany |
| Edoardo Lerna | 2008–09 | 7 | 2 | 0 | 0 | 8 | 13 June 2008 | Germany |
| Lorenzo Luccardi | 2017 | 1 | 0 | 0 | 0 | 0 | 10 June 2017 | Spain |
| Filippo Macerati | 2009 | 2 | 0 | 0 | 0 | 0 | 18 July 2009 | Germany |
| Bryce Magnone | 2023 | 1 | 0 | 0 | 0 | 0 | 7 October 2023 | Malta |
| Jake Maizen | 2022 | 3 | 4 | 0 | 0 | 16 | 16 October 2022 | Scotland |
| Lorenzo Maniero | 2008 | 1 | 0 | 0 | 0 | 0 | 13 June 2008 | Germany |
| Josh Mantellato | 2011–18 | 11 | 7 | 52 | 0 | 132 | 16 October 2011 | Russia |
| Rodrigo Marchesi | 2012–13 | 4 | 1 | 0 | 0 | 4 | 9 June 2012 | Serbia |
| Jonathan Marcinczak | 2008–15 | 12 | 0 | 0 | 0 | 0 | 12 July 2008 | Czech Republic |
| Massimo Mati | 2023–25 | 2 | 0 | 0 | 0 | 0 | 28 October 2023 | South Africa |
| Vic Mauro | 2011 | 2 | 0 | 0 | 0 | 0 | 23 October 2011 | Serbia |
| Matteo Mazzoleni | 2016 | 1 | 0 | 0 | 0 | 0 | 12 June 2016 | Lebanon |
| Andrea Medori | 2008 | 1 | 0 | 0 | 0 | 0 | 12 July 2008 | Czech Republic |
| Romain Mencarini | 2014 | 1 | 0 | 0 | 0 | 0 | 26 July 2014 | Russia |
| Saif Mhadhbi | 2015 | 1 | 0 | 0 | 0 | 0 | 20 June 2015 | Serbia |
| Francesco Michielin | 2008 | 2 | 0 | 0 | 0 | 0 | 13 June 2008 | Germany |
| Luca Milani | 2014–15 | 5 | 0 | 0 | 0 | 0 | 5 July 2014 | Ukraine |
| Nathan Milone | 2017 | 3 | 2 | 0 | 0 | 8 | 29 October 2017 | Ireland |
| Anthony Minichiello | 2011–13 | 6 | 4 | 0 | 0 | 16 | 16 October 2011 | Russia |
| Mark Minichiello | 2013–17 | 6 | 1 | 0 | 0 | 4 | 26 October 2013 | Wales |
| Joel Miranda | 2013–14 | 3 | 3 | 0 | 0 | 12 | 27 July 2013 | Germany |
| Santiago Monteaguido | 2012 | 1 | 0 | 0 | 0 | 0 | 9 June 2012 | Serbia |
| Michele Morao | 2017 | 1 | 0 | 0 | 0 | 0 | 10 June 2017 | Spain |
| Luca Moretti | 2022 | 3 | 0 | 0 | 0 | 0 | 16 October 2022 | Scotland |
| Marco Moretti | 2025 | 1 | 0 | 0 | 0 | 0 | 4 October 2025 | Lebanon |
| Danielle Morro | 2008 | 2 | 1 | 0 | 0 | 4 | 13 June 2008 | Germany |
| Drake Muyodi | 2012–14 | 7 | 1 | 0 | 0 | 4 | 9 June 2012 | Serbia |
| Alexander Myles | 2019–23 | 5 | 0 | 0 | 0 | 0 | 12 October 2019 | Malta |
| Fabio Nannini | 2012 | 1 | 0 | 0 | 0 | 0 | 8 September 2012 | Russia |
| Dominic Nasso | 2011 | 3 | 3 | 0 | 0 | 12 | 16 October 2011 | Russia |
| Raymond Nasso | 2009–13 | 9 | 5 | 0 | 0 | 20 | 8 November 2009 | Serbia |
| Damian Nati | 2023–25 | 4 | 2 | 1 | 0 | 10 | 7 October 2023 | Malta |
| Ethan Natoli | 2017–22 | 8 | 0 | 0 | 0 | 0 | 8 October 2017 | Malta |
| Josh Natoli | 2019–23 | 4 | 1 | 0 | 0 | 4 | 12 October 2019 | Malta |
| Tommaso Nicoli | 2017 | 2 | 0 | 0 | 0 | 0 | 3 June 2017 | Lebanon |
| Antonio Obasi | 2025 | 1 | 0 | 0 | 0 | 0 | 25 October 2025 | Greece |
| Ippolito Occhialini | 2023–24 | 2 | 0 | 0 | 0 | 0 | 27 May 2023 | Serbia |
| Nick Okladnikov | 2018–19 | 4 | 1 | 0 | 0 | 4 | 12 October 2018 | South Africa |
| Michele Olocco | 2019 | 1 | 2 | 0 | 0 | 8 | 19 October 2019 | Philippines |
| Davide Padovan | 2008 | 1 | 0 | 0 | 0 | 0 | 12 July 2008 | Czech Republic |
| Giuseppe Pagani | 2014–17 | 9 | 2 | 0 | 0 | 8 | 5 July 2014 | Ukraine |
| Ronny Palumbo | 2019–23 | 7 | 1 | 0 | 0 | 4 | 12 October 2019 | Malta |
| Dean Parata | 2013–22 | 10 | 1 | 0 | 0 | 4 | 26 October 2013 | Wales |
| Matt Parata | 2011–17 | 4 | 2 | 0 | 0 | 8 | 16 October 2011 | Russia |
| Ricardo Parata | 2017 | 1 | 2 | 0 | 0 | 8 | 8 October 2017 | Malta |
| Daniele Pasqualini | 2009 | 2 | 1 | 0 | 0 | 4 | 11 July 2009 | Czech Republic |
| Emanuele Passera | 2014–25 | 11 | 2 | 0 | 0 | 8 | 26 July 2014 | Russia |
| Shane Pavan | 2009 | 3 | 0 | 0 | 0 | 0 | 17 October 2009 | Scotland |
| Romain Pavori | 2012–13 | 2 | 1 | 0 | 0 | 4 | 9 June 2012 | Serbia |
| Gert Peens | 2012–13 | 6 | 2 | 23 | 0 | 54 | 9 June 2012 | Serbia |
| Mirko Pellegrini | 2008 | 1 | 0 | 0 | 0 | 0 | 12 July 2008 | Czech Republic |
| Brock Pelligra | 2018–19 | 4 | 3 | 9 | 0 | 30 | 12 October 2018 | South Africa |
| Daniel Petralia | 2018–19 | 6 | 2 | 0 | 0 | 8 | 12 October 2018 | South Africa |
| Gianluca Pettachi | 2008 | 1 | 0 | 0 | 0 | 0 | 13 June 2008 | Germany |
| Edoardo Pezzano | 2016–17 | 3 | 0 | 0 | 0 | 0 | 12 June 2016 | Lebanon |
| Jack Piccirilli | 2023–25 | 5 | 8 | 2 | 0 | 36 | 7 October 2023 | Malta |
| Angelo Piccone | 2017 | 1 | 0 | 0 | 0 | 0 | 8 October 2017 | Malta |
| Kyle Pickering | 2022–23 | 3 | 1 | 0 | 0 | 4 | 29 October 2022 | Australia |
| Thomas Piscitelli | 2012–14 | 3 | 0 | 0 | 0 | 0 | 7 July 2012 | Germany |
| Leonard Plati | 2025 | 3 | 1 | 0 | 0 | 4 | 4 October 2025 | Lebanon |
| Luke Polselli | 2022 | 3 | 1 | 0 | 0 | 4 | 16 October 2022 | Scotland |
| Damon Potts | 2025 | 1 | 0 | 0 | 0 | 0 | 4 October 2025 | Lebanon |
| Marco Pozzebon | 2009 | 1 | 0 | 0 | 0 | 0 | 11 July 2009 | Czech Republic |
| Cederic Prizzon | 2011–13 | 6 | 1 | 0 | 0 | 4 | 16 October 2011 | Russia |
| Fabio Prizzoni | 2013 | 1 | 0 | 0 | 0 | 0 | 27 July 2013 | Germany |
| Kieran Quabba | 2016–17 | 3 | 0 | 0 | 0 | 0 | 22 October 2016 | Serbia |
| Mauro Quarino | 2023 | 1 | 0 | 0 | 0 | 0 | 27 May 2023 | Serbia |
| Rob Quitadamo | 2009–11 | 3 | 1 | 0 | 0 | 4 | 8 November 2009 | Serbia |
| Paolo Radosta | 2017 | 1 | 0 | 0 | 0 | 0 | 10 June 2017 | Spain |
| Davide Rancati | 2012–13 | 4 | 1 | 0 | 0 | 4 | 9 June 2012 | Serbia |
| Alex Ranieri | 2011 | 3 | 0 | 0 | 0 | 0 | 16 October 2011 | Russia |
| Angelo Ricci | 2008–15 | 9 | 3 | 0 | 0 | 12 | 13 June 2008 | Germany |
| Joel Riethmuller | 2011–17 | 12 | 2 | 0 | 0 | 8 | 16 October 2011 | Russia |
| Alessio Rigo | 2017 | 2 | 1 | 0 | 0 | 4 | 3 June 2017 | Lebanon |
| Vince Ripepi | 2018–19 | 3 | 1 | 0 | 0 | 4 | 12 October 2018 | South Africa |
| Giovanni Rizzo | 2023 | 1 | 0 | 0 | 0 | 0 | 27 May 2023 | Serbia |
| Radean Robinson | 2022 | 3 | 0 | 0 | 0 | 0 | 16 October 2022 | Scotland |
| Alex Rojatto | 2023 | 1 | 0 | 0 | 0 | 0 | 27 May 2023 | Serbia |
| Kelly Rolleston | 2012–15 | 2 | 0 | 0 | 0 | 0 | 8 September 2012 | Russia |
| Luca Rossetti | 2015–16 | 3 | 0 | 0 | 0 | 0 | 18 July 2015 | Ukraine |
| Joel Saldaneri | 2025 | 1 | 0 | 0 | 0 | 0 | 4 October 2025 | Lebanon |
| James Saltonstall | 2013–14 | 3 | 2 | 0 | 0 | 8 | 29 June 2013 | Russia |
| Matt Sands | 2008–17 | 15 | 2 | 1 | 0 | 10 | 13 June 2008 | Germany |
| Brenden Santi | 2013–22 | 16 | 6 | 1 | 0 | 26 | 26 October 2013 | Wales |
| Mattia Saoncella | 2024–25 | 3 | 0 | 0 | 0 | 0 | 28 September 2024 | Malta |
| Todd Sapienza | 2017–23 | 3 | 1 | 1 | 0 | 6 | 8 October 2017 | Malta |
| Riccardo Scandurra | 2013–14 | 3 | 0 | 0 | 0 | 0 | 14 September 2013 | Serbia |
| Lachlan Scarpelli | 2018–19 | 2 | 2 | 0 | 0 | 8 | 27 October 2018 | Niue |
| Rhys Sciglitano | 2018–19 | 6 | 1 | 0 | 0 | 4 | 12 October 2018 | South Africa |
| Nick Serafino | 2018 | 1 | 0 | 0 | 0 | 0 | 12 October 2018 | South Africa |
| Marco Severino | 2025 | 1 | 0 | 0 | 0 | 0 | 4 October 2025 | Lebanon |
| Mishel Shmai | 2023 | 1 | 0 | 0 | 0 | 0 | 27 May 2023 | Serbia |
| Liam Signorini | 2024 | 1 | 0 | 0 | 0 | 0 | 28 September 2024 | Malta |
| Kade Snowden | 2013 | 2 | 0 | 0 | 0 | 0 | 3 November 2013 | Scotland |
| Andrea Sola | 2012–13 | 2 | 0 | 0 | 0 | 0 | 9 June 2012 | Serbia |
| Ryan Solda | 2025 | 2 | 0 | 0 | 0 | 0 | 18 October 2025 | Ukraine |
| Lorenzo Sosta | 2023–24 | 2 | 0 | 0 | 0 | 0 | 27 May 2023 | Serbia |
| Francesco Speggiorin | 2024–25 | 3 | 0 | 0 | 0 | 0 | 28 September 2024 | Malta |
| Davide Spinnato | 2016–17 | 2 | 2 | 0 | 0 | 8 | 12 June 2016 | Lebanon |
| George Stamatatos | 2025 | 3 | 1 | 0 | 0 | 4 | 4 October 2025 | Lebanon |
| Paul Stanica | 2009 | 5 | 0 | 0 | 0 | 0 | 11 July 2009 | Czech Republic |
| Simone Stanissa | 2017 | 1 | 0 | 0 | 0 | 0 | 3 June 2017 | Lebanon |
| Ben Stewart | 2011 | 2 | 1 | 0 | 0 | 4 | 23 October 2011 | Serbia |
| Alec Susino | 2017–22 | 5 | 0 | 0 | 0 | 0 | 8 October 2017 | Malta |
| Michele Sutto | 2016 | 1 | 0 | 0 | 0 | 0 | 12 June 2016 | Lebanon |
| Andrea Tagliavento | 2009 | 2 | 0 | 0 | 0 | 0 | 24 October 2009 | Lebanon |
| James Tedesco | 2013–17 | 6 | 3 | 0 | 0 | 12 | 26 October 2013 | Wales |
| Matt Tedesco | 2018–19 | 3 | 0 | 0 | 0 | 0 | 27 October 2018 | Niue |
| Giona Toffoletti | 2023–24 | 2 | 1 | 0 | 0 | 4 | 27 May 2023 | Serbia |
| Gaetan Tomaso | 2009 | 1 | 0 | 0 | 0 | 0 | 18 July 2009 | Germany |
| Ludovico Torregiani | 2009 | 3 | 0 | 0 | 0 | 0 | 17 October 2009 | Scotland |
| Joey Tramontana | 2016–23 | 12 | 4 | 0 | 0 | 16 | 4 November 2016 | Russia |
| Ryan Tramonte | 2009–16 | 8 | 0 | 0 | 0 | 0 | 8 November 2009 | Serbia |
| John Trimboli | 2018–19 | 5 | 0 | 0 | 0 | 0 | 12 October 2018 | South Africa |
| Ikenna Michele Ugwo | 2025 | 2 | 0 | 0 | 0 | 0 | 18 October 2025 | Ukraine |
| Francesco Vallone | 2023–25 | 3 | 0 | 0 | 0 | 0 | 27 May 2023 | Serbia |
| Paul Vaughan | 2013–17 | 6 | 1 | 0 | 0 | 4 | 26 October 2013 | Wales |
| Michele Verardi | 2013–14 | 3 | 0 | 0 | 0 | 0 | 27 July 2013 | Germany |
| Filippo Veronese | 2008–09 | 7 | 1 | 29 | 0 | 62 | 13 June 2008 | Germany |
| Dean Vicelich | 2009–11 | 5 | 4 | 0 | 0 | 16 | 24 October 2009 | Lebanon |
| Chris Vitalini | 2012–14 | 4 | 1 | 0 | 0 | 4 | 7 July 2012 | Germany |
| Lorenzo Vizzolo | 2025 | 2 | 0 | 0 | 0 | 0 | 18 October 2025 | Ukraine |
| Luke Wakefield | 2025 | 1 | 0 | 0 | 0 | 0 | 4 October 2025 | Lebanon |
| Shannon Wakeman | 2016–17 | 6 | 2 | 0 | 0 | 8 | 22 October 2016 | Serbia |
| Jayden Walker | 2016–17 | 7 | 2 | 0 | 0 | 8 | 22 October 2016 | Serbia |
| Colin Wilkie | 2016–17 | 4 | 3 | 0 | 0 | 12 | 22 October 2016 | Serbia |
| Dan Wilson | 2008 | 1 | 1 | 1 | 0 | 6 | 13 June 2008 | Germany |
| Andrea Zacchia | 2008 | 2 | 0 | 0 | 0 | 0 | 12 July 2008 | Czech Republic |
| Marc Zaurrini | 2019 | 1 | 2 | 0 | 0 | 8 | 19 October 2019 | Philippines |
| Tommaso Zuliani | 2023 | 1 | 0 | 0 | 0 | 0 | 27 May 2023 | Serbia |
