= Italy rugby team =

Italy rugby team may refer to:

- Italy national rugby league team
- Italy national rugby union team
