= Saluzzo Roosters =

Italian rugby league club

Club information
- Founded: 2010; 15 years ago
- Website: Official website

Current details
- Ground(s): Centro Sportivo di Manta
- Coach: Elio Giacoma
- Competition: National Division 2 - PACA B
- 2018/19: 5th

The Saluzzo Roosters, formerly known as the North West Roosters, are a rugby league club based in Saluzzo, Piedmont, Italy. Founded in 2010 as a rugby union club, the Roosters changed to playing rugby league in 2015. They currently compete in the Provence-Alpes-Côte d'Azur (PACA) division of the French National Division 2. As of 2019 they have since switched back to Rugby Union.

== 2017/18 season ==
The Roosters became the first Italian rugby league club to play in a foreign competition when they joined the PACA division of the National Division 2, France's fourth-tier rugby league competition, for the 2016/17 season. Coached by Elio Giacoma, the team sported Gioele Celerino and Mirco Bergamasco in their final match, which was their only win of the competition.

Results
| Date | Opponent | Score |
|---|---|---|
| 20 November 2016 | Racing Club Caumont 2 | 10 – 52 |
| 11 December 2016 | Marseille Avenir | 6 – 66 |
| 18 December 2016 | Saint-Martin 2 | 16 – 52 |
| 8 January 2017 | RC Carpentras 2 | 4 – 72 |
| 12 February 2017 | Marseille Avenir | 18 – 88 |
| 26 February 2017 | RC Carpentras 2 | 14 – 48 |
| 12 March 2017 | Racing Club Caumont 2 | 12 – 28 |
| 25 March 2017 | Saint-Martin 2 | 26 – 16 |
Legend: Win Loss Draw

Standings
| Pos | Team | Pld | W | D | L | PF | PA | PD | Pts |
|---|---|---|---|---|---|---|---|---|---|
| 1 | Marseille Avenir | 8 | 6 | 0 | 2 | 350 | 184 | +166 | 18 |
| 2 | Racing Club Caumont 2 | 8 | 5 | 0 | 3 | 244 | 142 | +102 | 15 |
| 3 | RC Carpentras 2 | 8 | 5 | 0 | 3 | 282 | 196 | +86 | 14 |
| 4 | Saint-Martin 2 | 8 | 3 | 0 | 5 | 202 | 240 | -38 | 8 |
| 5 | Saluzzo Roosters | 8 | 1 | 0 | 7 | 106 | 422 | -316 | 3 |
