= Jack Colovatti =

Italy international rugby league footballer

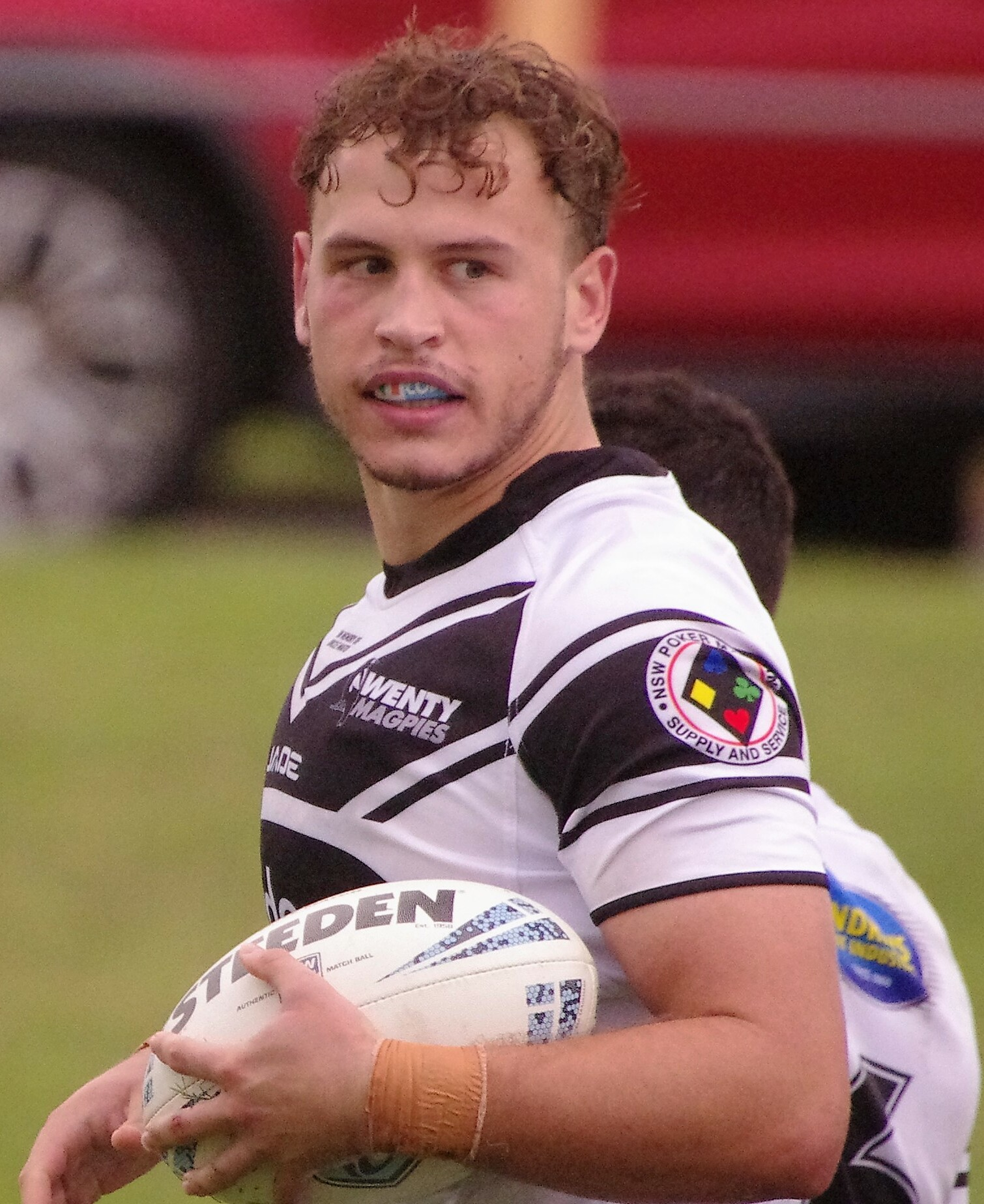

Personal information
- Full name: Jack Colovatti
- Born: 26 February 2001 (age 24); Mortlake, New South Wales, Australia

Playing information
- Position: Prop, Second-row
Representative
Years	Team	Pld	T	G	FG	P
2022–	Italy	4	1	0	0	4
- Source: As of 28 October 2023

Jack Colovatti (born 26 February 2001) is an Italy international rugby league footballer who plays as a prop or second-row forward for the Parramatta Eels in the NSW Cup.

== Background ==
Colovatti is of Italian descent. His family came from Trieste.

He played for the Batemans Bay Tigers as a junior and for the Canberra Raiders in the S. G. Ball Cup.

In addition to playing rugby league, Colovatti works with the Giant Steps charity helping autistic children at a school in Gladesville, New South Wales.

== Playing career ==
=== Club career ===
Colovatti played for the Parramatta Eels in the Jersey Flegg Cup in 2021 and 2022.

He played in two games for Parramatta in the 2022 Knock On Effect NSW Cup. He has been called out as a "promising talent".

=== International career ===
In 2022, Colovatti was named in the Italy squad for the 2021 Rugby League World Cup. He is one of around 40 players at the age of 21 or under at the World Cup.

Colovatti was part of the Italian team in a pre-tournament friendly against Lebanon in September 2022. He made his test debut against Scotland, playing 34 minutes off the bench in the Group B match at Kingston Park in Newcastle. He earned his second full cap against Fiji the following week.
