= Ryan King (rugby league) =

Italy international rugby league footballer

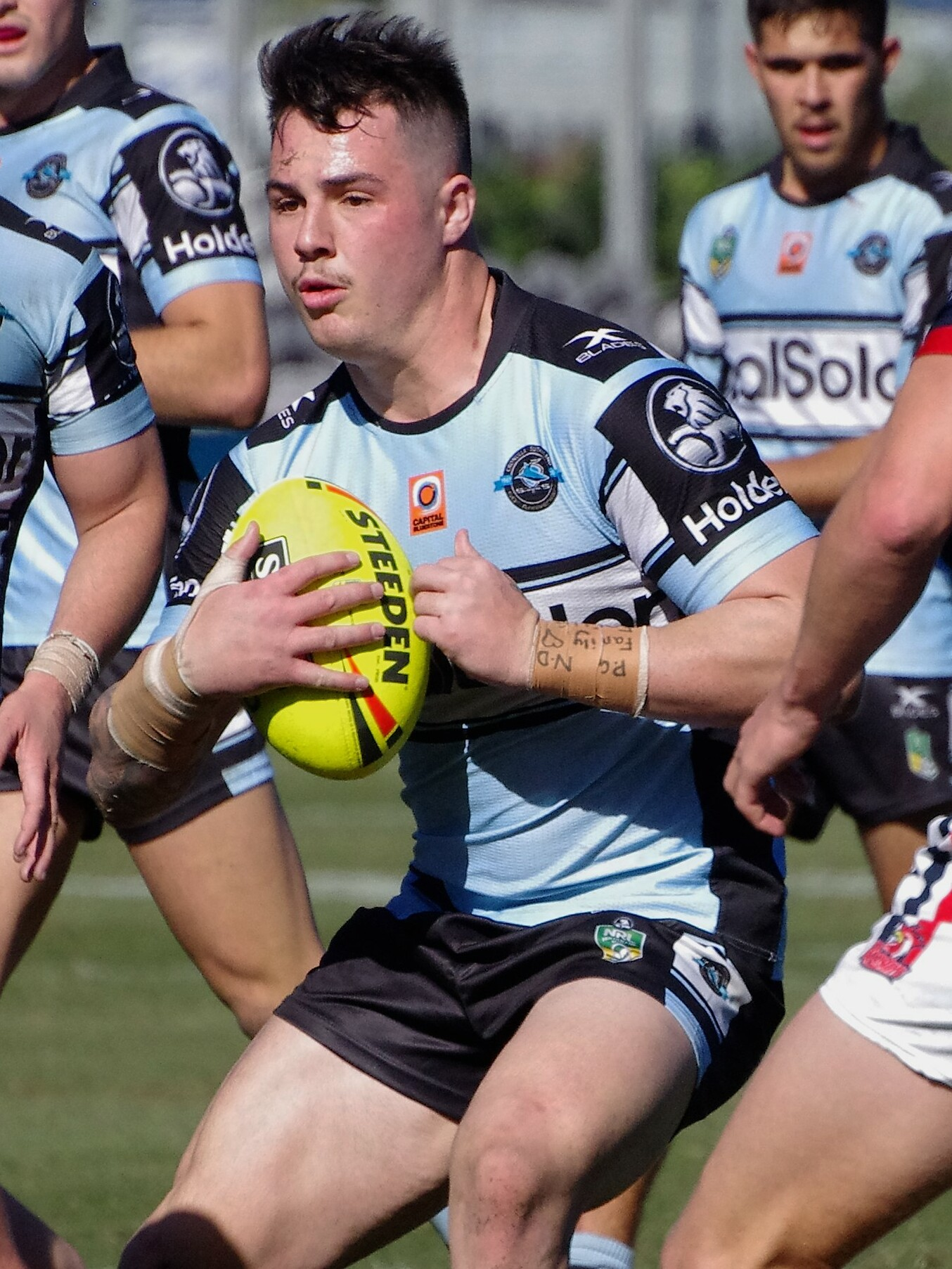

Personal information
- Full name: Ryan King
- Born: 28 June 1997 (age 29) Wollongong, New South Wales, Australia

Playing information
- Position: Second-row
Club
Years	Team	Pld	T	G	FG	P
2021–22	Whitehaven RLFC	36	17	0	0	68
2023	Halifax Panthers	2	0	0	0	0
2023–24	Whitehaven RLFC	41	28	0	0	112
2025–	Barrow Raiders	0	0	0	0	0
	Total	79	45	0	0	180
Representative
Years	Team	Pld	T	G	FG	P
2019–	Italy	5	1	0	0	4
- Source: As of 3 January 2025

Ryan King (born 28 June 1997) is an Italy international rugby league footballer who plays as a second-row for semi-professional side Barrow Raiders in the Championship.

== Background ==
King was born in Wollongong, New South Wales, Australia. He is of Italian descent.

He played junior rugby league for Wests Illawarra Devils.

== Playing career ==
=== Cronulla Sharks ===
King joined the Cronulla-Sutherland Sharks in 2017 and played for their NRL Under-20s team.

=== Whitehaven RLFC ===
Ryan King played in 26 games, and scored 14 tries for Whitehaven in the 2022 RFL Championship.

=== Barrow Raiders ===
On 20 September 2024 he signed for Barrow Raiders in the RFL Championship on a 1-year deal.

=== International career ===
In 2022 King was named in the Italy squad for the 2021 Rugby League World Cup.
