= Daniel Atkinson =

Italy international rugby league footballer

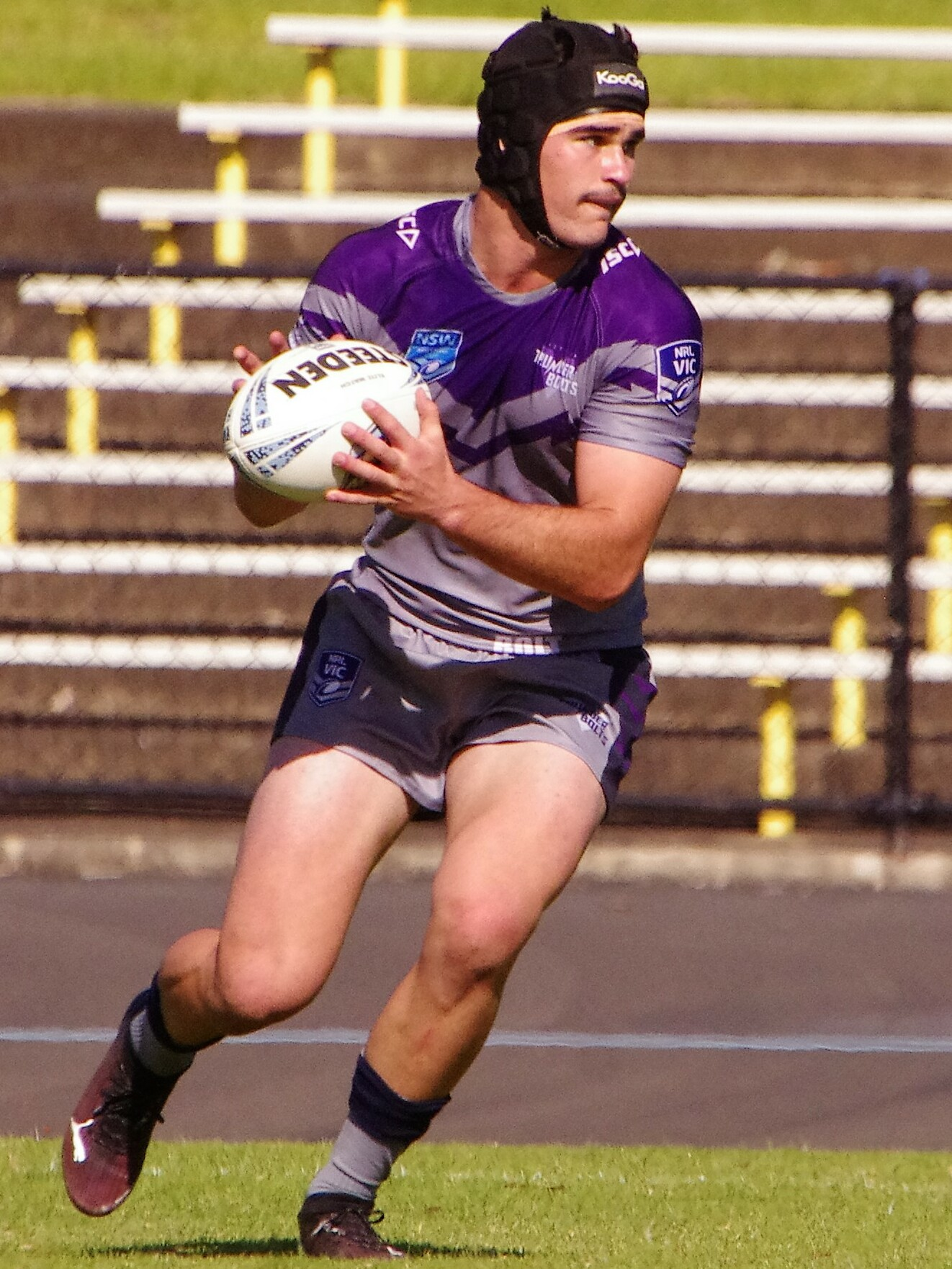

Personal information
- Born: 15 January 2001 (age 25) Brisbane, Queensland, Australia
- Height: 185 cm (6 ft 1 in)
- Weight: 89 kg (14 st 0 lb)

Playing information
- Position: Five-eighth, Halfback, Fullback
Club
Years	Team	Pld	T	G	FG	P
2021	Melbourne Storm	1	0	0	0	0
2023–25	Cronulla Sharks	36	8	14	2	62
2026–	St. George Illawarra	21	1	0	0	4
	Total	58	9	14	2	66
Representative
Years	Team	Pld	T	G	FG	P
2022	Italy	5	1	8	0	20
- Source: As of 5 September 2026

Daniel Atkinson (born 15 January 2001) is an Italy international rugby league footballer who plays as a five-eighth or halfback for the St. George Illawarra Dragons in the National Rugby League (NRL).

He previously played for the Cronulla-Sutherland Sharks and the Melbourne Storm.

== Early life ==
Atkinson was born in Brisbane, Queensland and was educated at St Joseph's College, Nudgee. It is whilst studying here, Atkinson had a stint at rugby union. Atkinson is of Italian descent.

He played junior rugby league for the Albany Creek Crushers, before signing with Norths Devils in the Queensland Cup Colts competition in 2019.

== Playing career ==
=== Early career ===
Ahead of the 2020 season, Atkinson was signed by the Melbourne Storm to a development contract and allocated to play for the Brisbane Tigers, making his Tigers' debut in the opening game of the 2021 Queensland Cup season.

Atkinson also played a number of games for the Victorian Thunderbolts in the Jersey Flegg Cup.

=== Melbourne Storm ===
In round 25 of the 2021 NRL season, Atkinson made his debut off the bench for Melbourne against Cronulla-Sutherland Sharks where they won 28–16. He had his Melbourne jersey (cap number 216) presented to him by Melbourne Storm teammate Dale Finucane and Football Manager Frank Ponissi.

At the end of the 2021 NRL season, Atkinson was released by Melbourne. In November 2021 he signed to play with the Sunshine Coast Falcons in the Queensland Cup. He would play the entire 2022 season with the Falcons.

=== Cronulla-Sutherland Sharks ===
Atkinson signed a contract to join the Cronulla-Sutherland Sharks squad for the 2023 NRL season, later extending for two further years. Atkinson’s first NRL appearance for Cronulla, and his first top-grade appearance in two years, came as he served as an injury replacement player during the final 3 minutes of the Sharks’ round 15 fixture.

In round 10 of the 2024 NRL season, Atkinson led his team to a 25–18 point win over rivals and former club, Melbourne Storm, without star halves partner Nicho Hynes. He kicked a field goal in the 74th minute to extend their lead and seal the win for Cronulla ending a six-year losing streak in Melbourne. In round 24 of the 2024 NRL season, Atkinson kicked the winning field goal in golden point extra-time as Cronulla defeated Newcastle 19–18. Atkinson played a total of 19 games for Cronulla in the 2024 NRL season as they finished 4th on the table and qualified for the finals. On 18 December, Cronulla's arch-rivals the St. George Illawarra Dragons officially announced the signing of Atkinson on a three-year deal which will start in the 2026 season. In round 11 of the 2025 NRL season, Atkinson scored two tries for Cronulla in their 31-26 victory over Melbourne.

=== St George-Illawarra Dragons ===
Atkinson made his club debut for St. George Illawarra in their 15-14 loss to Canterbury in the opening round of the 2026 season, played in Las Vegas. Atkinson played 19 games for St. George Illawarra in the 2026 NRL season as the club finished with the Wooden Spoon. It was the clubs first wooden spoon and the first any St. George affiliated side had received since 1938.

Atkinson in 2026

=== International career ===
Atkinson made his international rugby league debut for Italy at the 2021 Rugby League World Cup on 16 October 2022, playing in Italy's 28–4 win over Scotland.

== Statistics ==
Year	Team	Games	Tries	Goals	FG	Pts
2021	Melbourne Storm	1	0	0	0	0
2023	Cronulla-Sutherland Sharks	1	0	0	0	0
2024	Cronulla-Sutherland Sharks	19	5	14	2	50
2025	Cronulla-Sutherland Sharks	16	3	0	0	12
2026	St. George Illawarra Dragons	20	1	0	0	4
Career totals		57	9	14	2	66
