= Joseph Tramontana =

Italy international rugby league footballer

Joey Tramontana
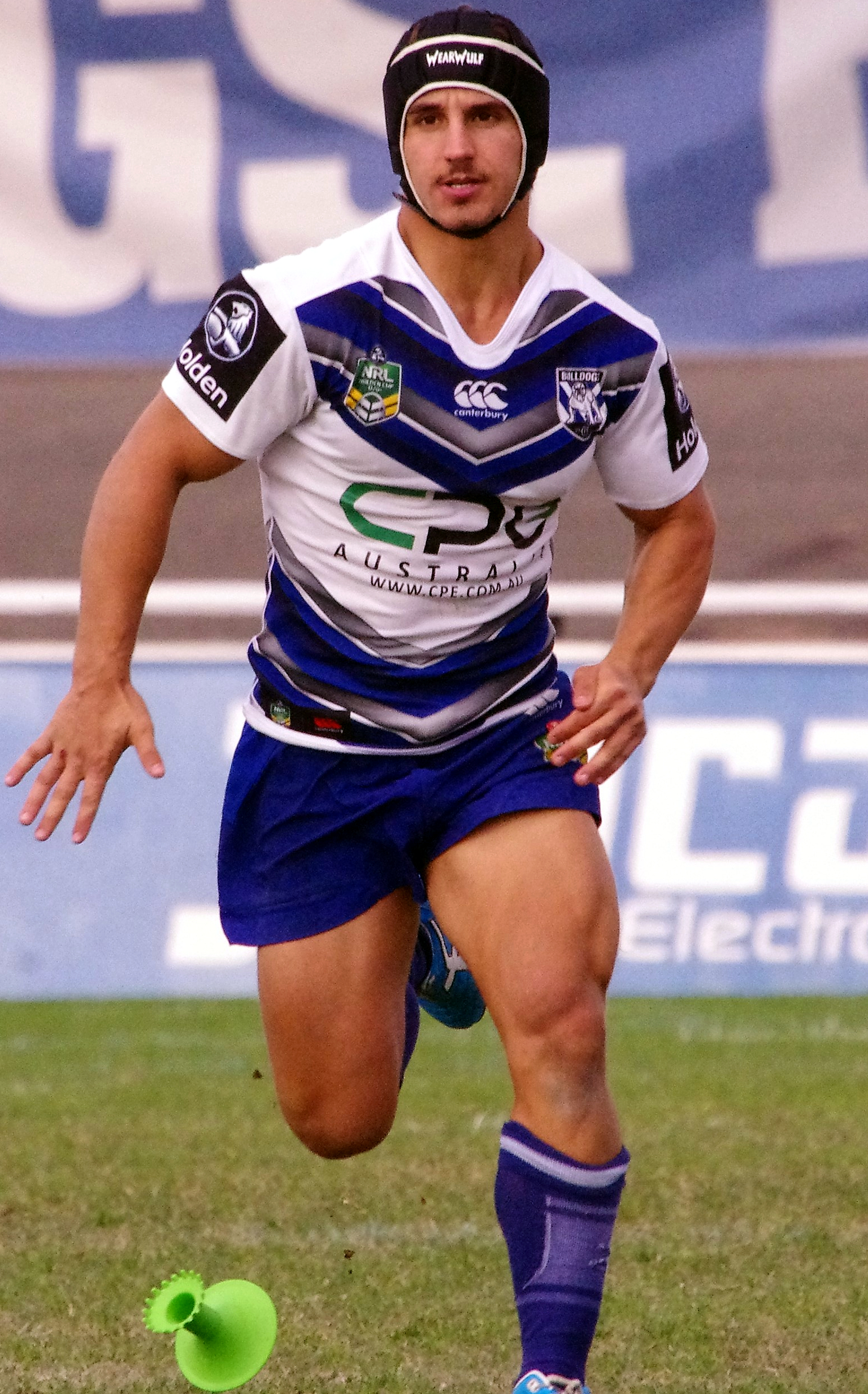

Personal information
- Full name: Joseph Tramontana
- Born: 15 February 1997 (age 29) Sydney, New South Wales, Australia
- Height: 172 cm (5 ft 8 in)
- Weight: 86 kg (13 st 8 lb)

Playing information
- Position: Hooker
Representative
Years	Team	Pld	T	G	FG	P
2016–	Italy	10	4	0	0	16
- Source: As of 30 October 2022

Joseph "Joey" Tramontana (born 15 February 1997) is an Italy international rugby league footballer who plays as a hooker for the Blacktown Workers Sea Eagles for the Intrust Super Premiership.

He represented Italy at the 2017 World Cup.

== Early years ==
Born in Sydney, New South Wales, Australia, Tramontana is of Italian descent. He played his junior rugby league for the Marconi Mustangs and attended Patrician Brothers College. He played for Patrician Brothers in the 2014 GIO Schoolboy Cup, winning the Peter Sterling Medal as player of the tournament.

== Playing career ==
=== Early career ===
Tramontana played in the Parramatta Eels' Harold Matthews Cup team, and represented NSW at under-16 level in 2013. From 2016 to 2017, Tramontana played for the Canterbury-Bankstown Bulldogs in the National Youth Competition, captaining the team in 2017.

In 2016, Tramontana represented Italy in their World Cup qualifying campaign. The following year, he played in their 2017 World Cup squad.
