= Alec Susino =

Italy international rugby league footballer

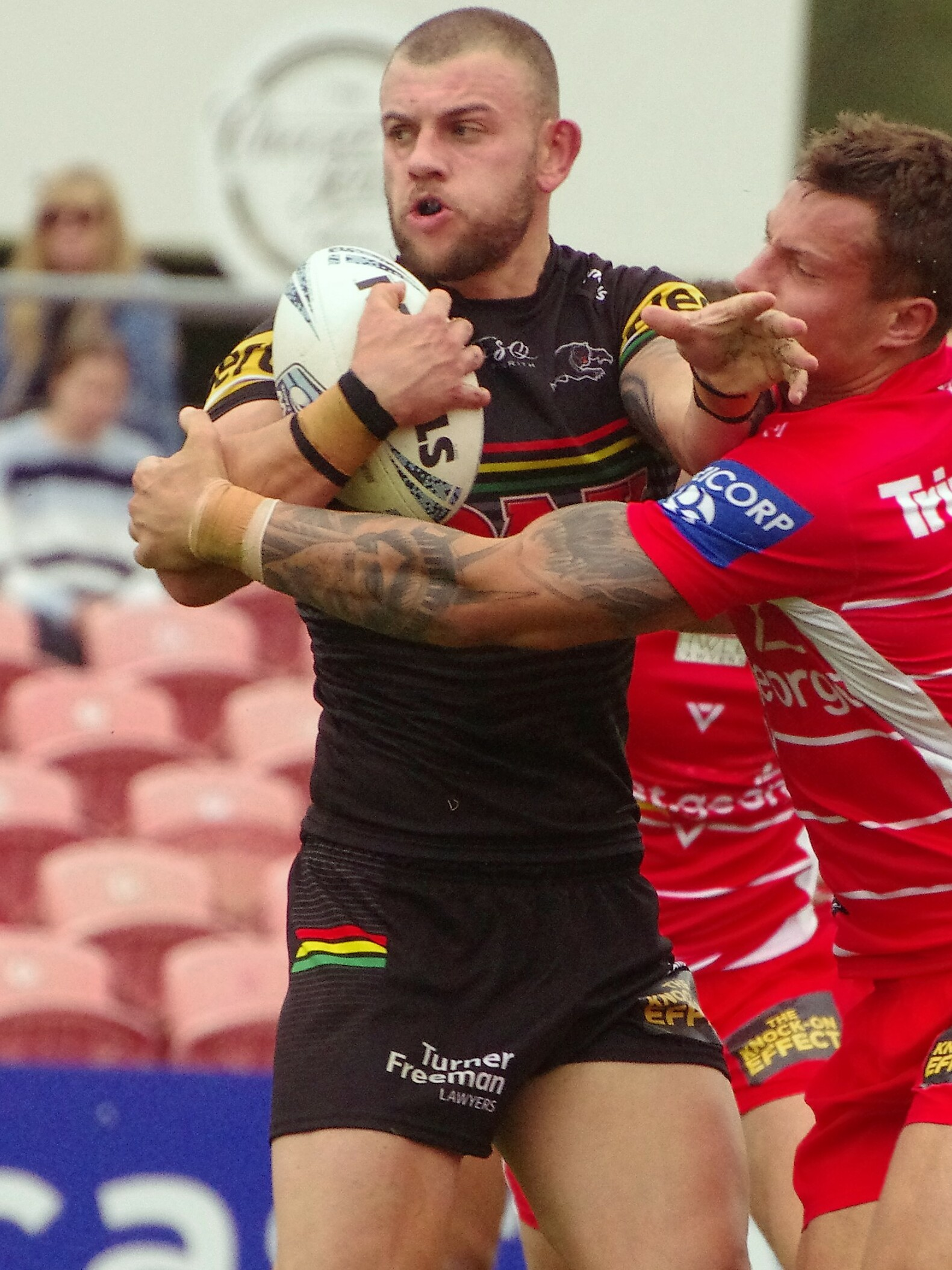

Personal information
- Full name: Alec Susino
- Born: 24 May 1995 (age 31) Campbelltown, New South Wales, Australia
- Height: 6 ft 2 in (1.88 m)
- Weight: 16 st 3 lb (103 kg)

Playing information
- Position: Prop, Second-row
Club
| Years | Team | Pld | T | G | FG | P |
|---|---|---|---|---|---|---|
| 2018–19 | Barrow Raiders | 51 | 8 | 0 | 0 | 32 |
| 2020 | Featherstone Rovers | 6 | 0 | 0 | 0 | 0 |
| | Total | 57 | 8 | 0 | 0 | 32 |
Representative
| Years | Team | Pld | T | G | FG | P |
| 2017– | Italy | 5 | 0 | 0 | 0 | 0 |
- Source: As of 30 October 2022

Alec Susino (born 24 May 1995) is an Italy international rugby league footballer who plays as a prop for the Penrith Panthers in the NSW Cup.

He previously played for the Barrow Raiders and Featherstone Rovers in the Championship.

== Background ==
Susino was born in Campbelltown, New South Wales, Australia. He is of Italian descent.

He played junior rugby league for the Marconi Mustangs.

== Playing career ==
=== Club career ===
Susino came through the youth system at the Cronulla-Sutherland Sharks, playing in their NRL Under-20s team.

He played for the Mount Pritchard Mounties in the 2017 NSW Cup.

Susino played in 51 games, and scored 8 tries for the Barrow Raiders between 2018 and 2019.

He played for Featherstone Rovers in the 2020 RFL Championship, returning home early due to the coronavirus.

Susino returned to Australia, signing with the Penrith Panthers ahead of their 2021 NSW Cup season.

=== International career ===
Susino made his international début for Italy in October 2017 against Malta.

In 2022 he was named in the Italy squad for the 2021 Rugby League World Cup.
