= Jake Maizen =

Italy international rugby league footballer

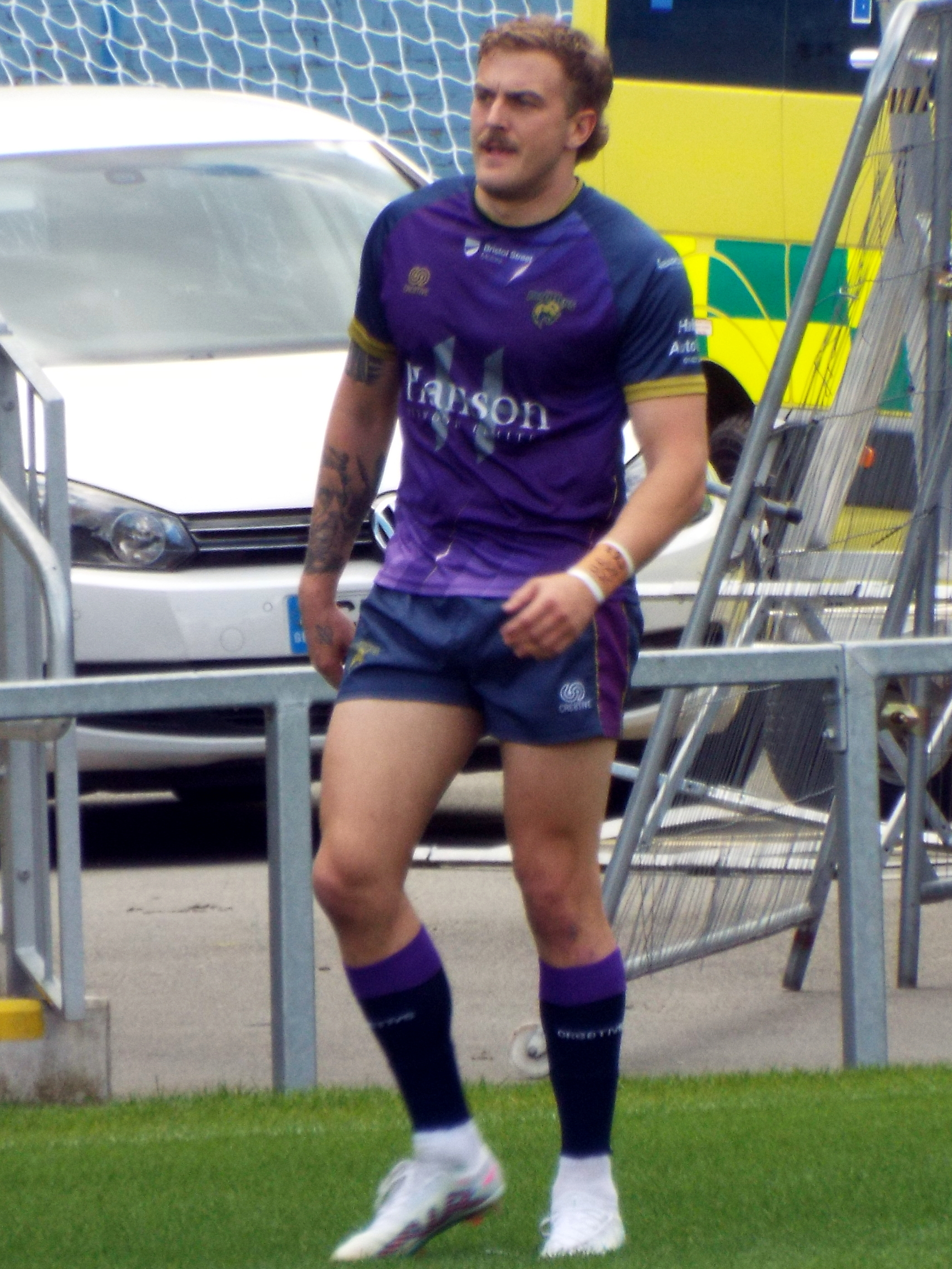

Personal information
- Full name: Jake Steven Maizen
- Born: 4 January 1997 (age 29) Australia
- Height: 189 cm (6 ft 2 in)
- Weight: 96 kg (15 st 2 lb)

Playing information
- Position: Centre, Fullback, Wing
Club
Years	Team	Pld	T	G	FG	P
2021–22	Sunshine Coast Falcons	20	9	0	0	16
2022–23	Halifax Panthers	21	8	0	0	32
2024	Whitehaven R.L.F.C.	4	3	0	0	12
2025–	Widnes Vikings	9	5	0	0	20
	Total	54	25	0	0	80
Representative
Years	Team	Pld	T	G	FG	P
2022–	Italy	3	4	0	0	16
- Source: As of 4 September 2026

Jake Maizen (born 4 January 1997) is an Italy international rugby league footballer who last played as a centre or winger for the Widnes Vikings in the RFL Championship.

== Background ==
Maizen is of Italian descent.

== Playing career ==
=== Club career ===
Maizen previously played for the Central Queensland Capras in the Queensland Cup.

He played in six games, and scored four tries for the Sunshine Coast Falcons in the 2022 Queensland Cup.

=== Whitehaven R.L.F.C. ===
On 8 November 2023 it was reported that he had signed for Whitehaven R.L.F.C. in the RFL Championship on a one-year deal.

=== Widnes Vikings ===
On 9 May 2025 it was reported that he had signed for Widnes Vikings in the RFL Championship on a 18-month deal. In July 2025 Maizen was issued with a backdated three-month ban for an anti-doping rule violation relating to a positive test for cocaine in July 2024.

=== International career ===
In 2022, Maizen was named in the Italy squad for the 2021 Rugby League World Cup. Maizen made his debut for Italy in the opening match of the 2021 Rugby League World Cup against Scotland scoring a hat-trick in Italy's 28–4 victory.
