= Bayley Liu =

Scotland international rugby league footballer (born 1996)

Personal information
- Full name: Uili Liu
- Born: 3 August 1996 (age 30) Christchurch, New Zealand
- Height: 6 ft 2 in (1.89 m)
- Weight: 16 st 5 lb (104 kg)

Playing information
- Position: Centre, Second-row
Club
Years	Team	Pld	T	G	FG	P
2020	Central Queensland Capras	3	0	0	0	0
2021	Dewsbury Rams	7	1	0	0	4
2022–24	Sheffield Eagles	58	20	0	0	80
2025	Bradford Bulls	10	2	0	0	8
2025(loan)	→ Batley Bulldogs	1	1	0	0	4
2026	Halifax Panthers	2	1	0	0	4
2026–	Oldham	20	9	0	0	36
	Total	101	34	0	0	136
Representative
Years	Team	Pld	T	G	FG	P
2022–	Scotland	3	1	0	0	4
- Source: As of 28 September 2026

Bayley Liu (born 3 August 1996) is a Scotland international rugby league footballer who plays as a centre or second-row forward for Oldham in the RFL Championship.

He previously played for the Dewsbury Rams, Sheffield Eagles and the Bradford Bulls in the Championship.

== Early life ==
Liu was born in Christchurch, New Zealand. He is of Māori (Tainui, Waikato) Samoan, Dutch and Scottish descent.

== Playing career ==
=== Club career ===
Liu played for the Central Queensland Capras in the Queensland Cup.

Liu joined the Dewsbury Rams ahead of the 2021 season.

=== Sheffield Eagles ===
He joined Sheffield ahead of the 2022 season.

=== Bradford Bulls ===
On 6 January 2025 it was reported that he had signed for Bradford in the RFL Championship on a one-year deal.

On 20 October 2025 it was reported that he had left Bradford Bulls

=== Batley Bulldogs (loan) ===
On 27 June 2025 it was reported that he had signed for Batley Bulldogs in the RFL Championship on 2-week loan

=== Halifax Panthers ===
He joined Halifax Panthers ahead of the 2026 season on a 1-year deal.

=== Oldham RLFC ===
On 10 March 2026 it was reported that he had signed for Oldham RLFC in the RFL Championship

=== International career ===
In 2022 Liu was named in the Scotland squad for the 2021 Rugby League World Cup.
