= Luke Polselli =

Italy international rugby league footballer

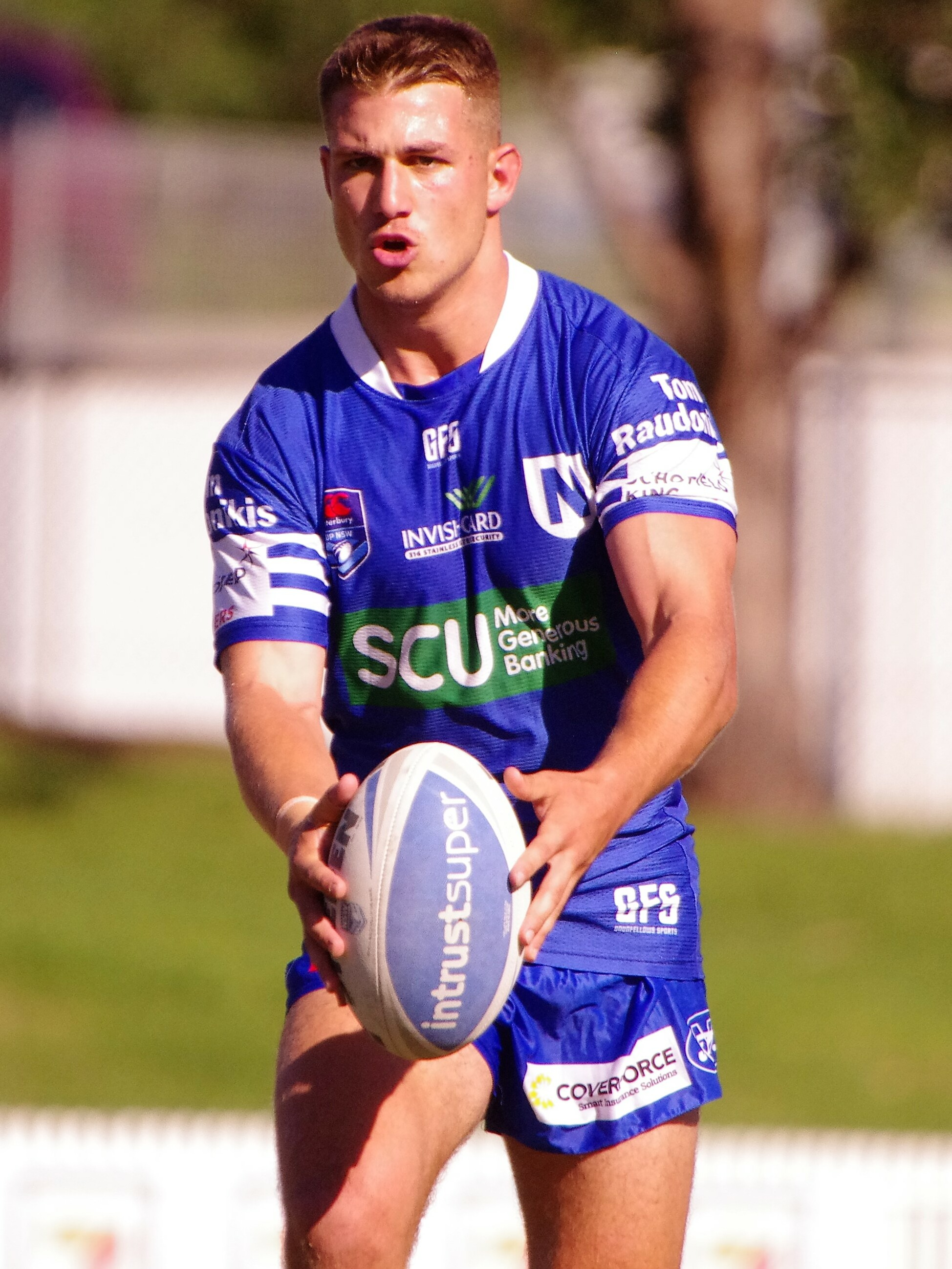

Personal information
- Full name: Luke Polselli
- Born: 6 August 1998 (age 27) Sydney, New South Wales, Australia
- Height: 6 ft 0 in (1.83 m)
- Weight: 14 st 0 lb (89 kg)

Playing information
- Position: Stand-off, Fullback, Centre
Club
Years	Team	Pld	T	G	FG	P
2025	London Broncos	25	10	1	0	42
2026–	Toulouse Olympique	8	2	0	0	0
	Total	33	12	1	0	42
Representative
Years	Team	Pld	T	G	FG	P
2022–	Italy	3	1	0	0	4
- Source: As of 26 October 2025

Luke Polselli (born 6 August 1998) is an Italy international rugby league footballer who plays as a centre or fullback for Toulouse Olympique in the Super League.

== Background ==
Polselli is of Italian descent.

== Playing career ==
=== Club career ===
Polselli previously played for the Mackay Cutters & the Sunshine Coast Falcons in the Queensland Cup.

=== Rochdale Mayfield ===
On 4 January 2025 it was reported that he had joined English club Rochdale Mayfield to play in the National Conference League.

=== London Broncos ===
On 20 January 2025 it was reported that he had signed for London Broncos in the RFL Championship.

=== Toulouse Olympique ===
On 26 October 2025 it was reported that he had signed for Toulouse Olympique in the Super League.

=== International career ===
In 2022, Polselli was named in the Italy squad for the 2021 Rugby League World Cup.
