= Anton Iaria =

Italy international rugby league footballer

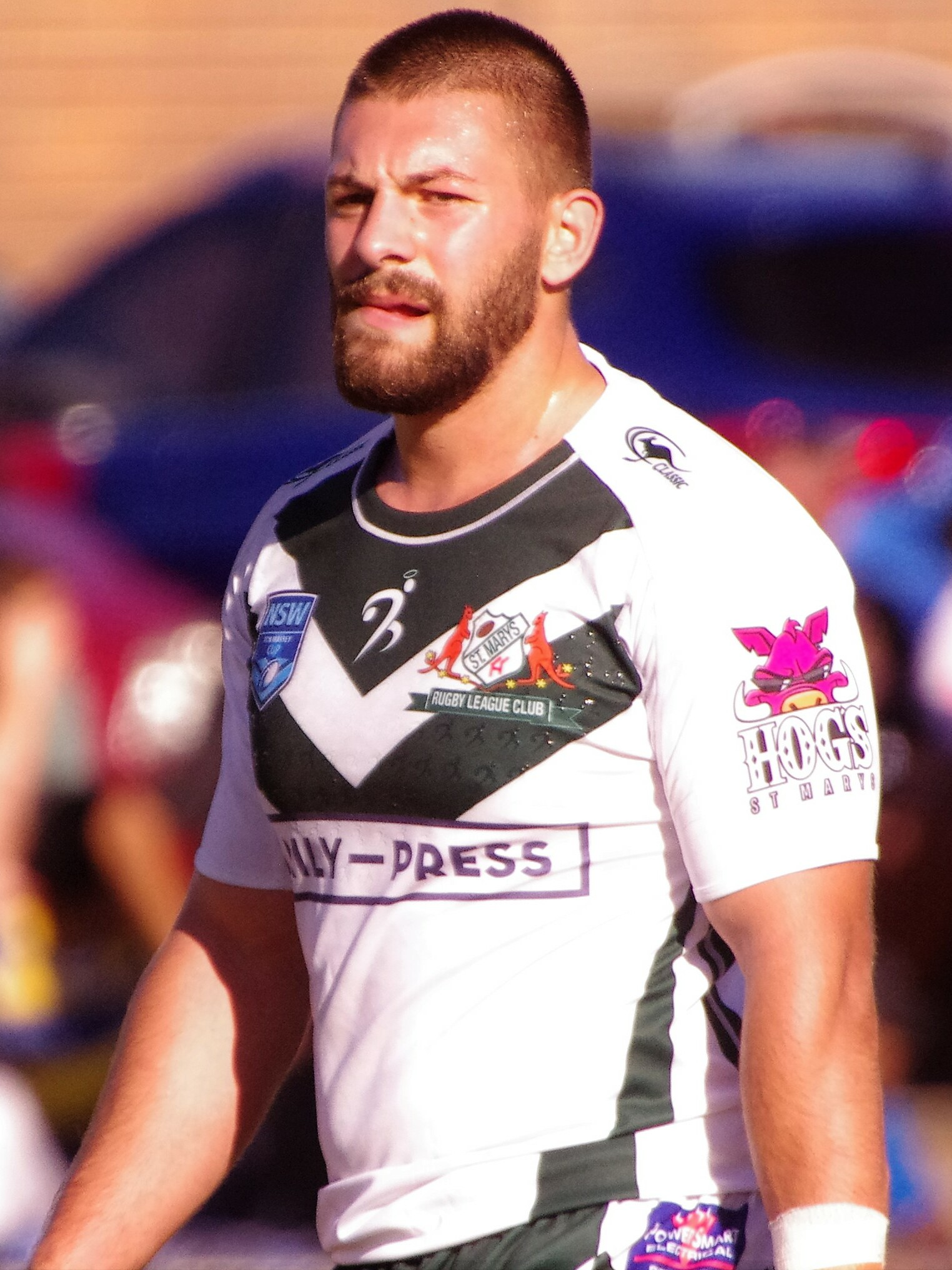

Personal information
- Full name: Anton Iaria
- Born: 24 January 1996 (age 29); Australia,
- Height: 6 ft 0 in (1.84 m)
- Weight: 15 st 13 lb (101 kg)

Playing information
- Position: Prop, Loose forward
Club
Years	Team	Pld	T	G	FG	P
2022–23	Barrow Raiders	49	10	0	0	40
Representative
Years	Team	Pld	T	G	FG	P
2017–	Italy	7	1	0	0	4
- Source: As of 5 December 2023

Anton Iaria (born 24 January 1996) is an Italy international rugby league footballer who last played as a prop for the Barrow Raiders in the Championship.

== Background ==
Iaria was born in Australia. He is of Italian descent and qualified to represent Italy through his paternal grandparents.

== Playing career ==
=== Club career ===
Iaria represented Easts Tigers in the Queensland Cup before leaving to joining St Marys Saints after the 2018 season. In 2021, Iaria played for Penrith Panthers in the New South Wales Cup until the season was suspended due to the pandemic. In November 2021, Iaria joined Barrow Raiders on a one-year deal. In June 2023, he made his 50th appearance for the club in a match against Halifax Panthers. This was also his final appearance before departing from Barrow to return to Australia. In January 2024, Iaria was named in the Blacktown Workers squad for the NSW Cup.

=== International career ===
In October 2017, Iaria made his début for Italy in a 24–24 draw against Malta. In October 2019, Iaria scored his first international try in Italy's 23–20 loss to Malta. Iaria was named in the squad for World Cup qualifiers in 2019 in which Italy played Spain and Ireland. In 2022, Iaria was named in the Italy squad for the 2021 Rugby League World Cup and played in the matches against Scotland, Fiji and Australia. In October 2023, Iaria played in Italy's wins over Malta and South Africa.
