= Ronny Palumbo =

Italy international rugby league footballer

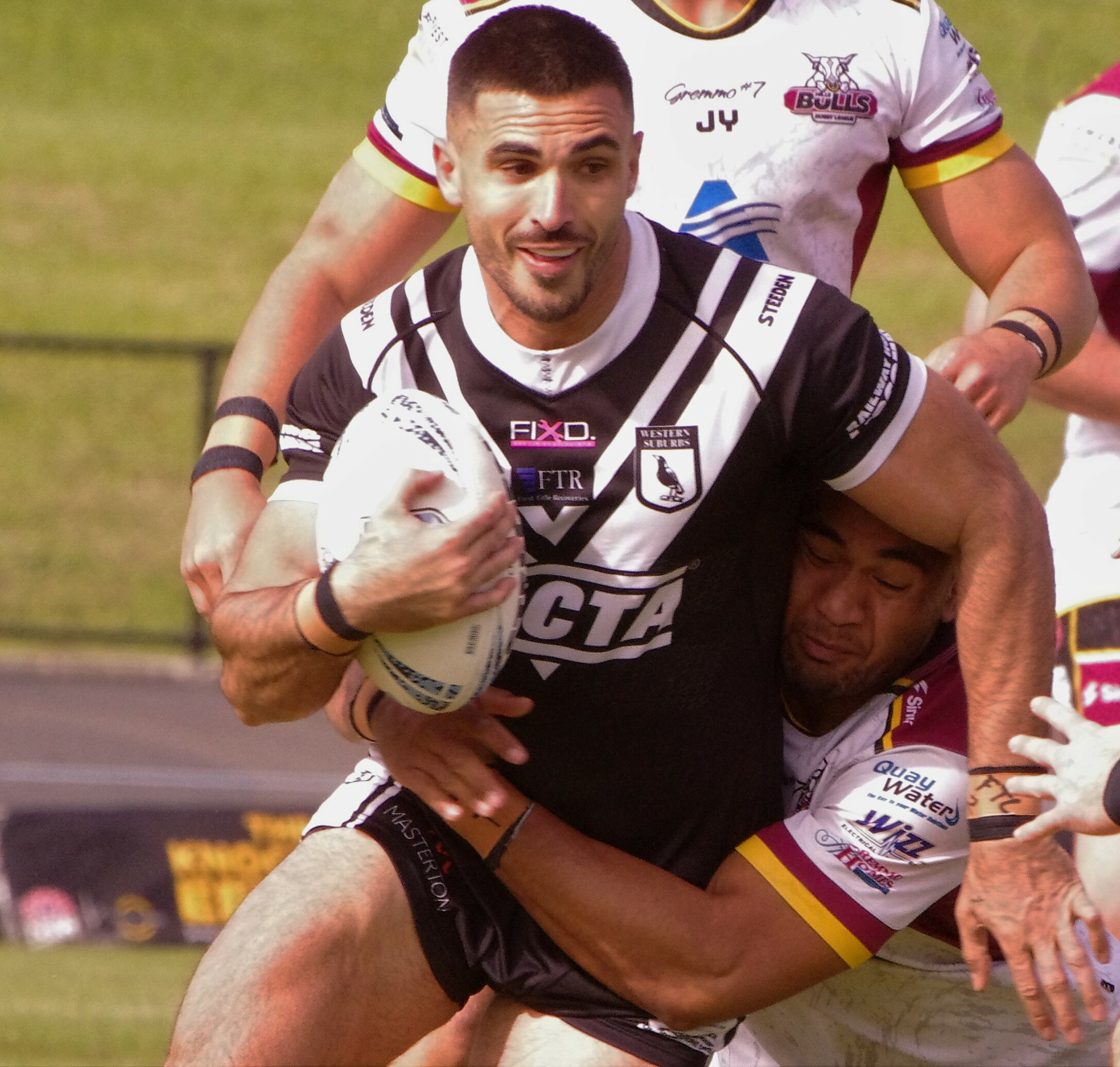

Personal information
- Full name: Rinaldo Palumbo
- Born: 22 April 1991 (age 34) Campbelltown, New South Wales, Australia
- Height: 6 ft 1 in (1.85 m)
- Weight: 15 st 4 lb (97 kg)

Playing information

Rugby league
- Position: Second-row, Centre
Club
Years	Team	Pld	T	G	FG	P
2017–18	Toulouse Olympique	18	4	0	0	16
2019	London Skolars	10	1	0	0	4
2020–21	Palau Broncos	16	6	3	0	30
2022	London Broncos	22	2	0	0	8
	Total	66	13	3	0	58
Representative
Years	Team	Pld	T	G	FG	P
2019–22	Italy	7	1	0	0	4

Rugby union
Club
Years	Team	Pld	T	G	FG	P
2018	Mystic River Rugby Club	12	4	0	0	20
- Source: As of 28 October 2023

Ronny Palumbo (born 22 April 1991) is a professional rugby league coach who is the head coach of the Blacktown Workers in the Ron Massey Cup and a former professional rugby league footballer who last played as a second-row and centre for the London Broncos and Italy at international level.

He previously played rugby union for a short time in 2018.

== Background ==
Palumbo was born in Campbelltown, New South Wales, Australia. He is of Italian descent.

He played his junior rugby league for the Campbelltown Harlequins, while attending well renowned rugby league school Patrician Brothers' College, Fairfield.

== Playing career ==
=== Club career ===
He played for the New South Wales Schoolboys Rugby Union side in 2008/2009.

Palumbo played in the New South Wales Cup for the Manly-Warringah Sea Eagles and the Western Suburbs Magpies.

In the 2017–18 season he played for Toulouse Olympique.

In 2018, Palumbo was granted a mid season release from Toulouse Olympique to join Mystic River Rugby Club, helping the club win the 2018 USA Rugby D1 National Championship.

In 2019 while on loan from the London Broncos , Palumbo played for the London Skolars in League 1.

In the 2020–21 season he played for the Palau Broncos in the Elite 1 Championship.

He joined London Broncos at the start of the 2022 season.

Palumbo was announced as the Head Coach of the Blacktown Workers for the 2026 season.

=== International career ===
In 2019, Palumbo made his international début for Italy against Malta. In 2022 he was named in the Italy squad for the 2021 Rugby League World Cup.

In the final group match at the 2021 Rugby League World Cup, Palumbo scored Italy's only try in their 66-6 loss against Australia.
