= Luke Bain =

Scotland international rugby league footballer

Personal information
- Full name: Luke Bain
- Born: 4 October 2000 (age 25) Concord, New Hampshire, USA
- Height: 6 ft 2 in (1.88 m)
- Weight: 14 st 13 lb (95 kg)

Playing information
- Position: Second-row, Loose forward
Club
Years	Team	Pld	T	G	FG	P
2024	Wakefield Trinity	12	1	0	0	4
Representative
Years	Team	Pld	T	G	FG	P
2022–	Scotland	3	0	0	0	0
- Source: As of 14 January 2025

Luke Bain (born 4 October 2000) is a Scotland international rugby league footballer who last played as a second-row and loose forward for Wakefield Trinity in the RFL Championship.

== Background ==
Bain was born in Concord, New Hampshire, USA. He is of Scottish descent.

== Playing career ==
=== Parramatta Eels ===
Bain played in 8 games, and scored 1 try for the Parramatta Eels in the 2022 NSW Cup.

=== Wakefield Trinity ===
On 10 November 2023 it was reported that he had signed for Wakefield Trinity in the RFL Championship on a two-year deal.

On 14 January 2025 it was reported that he had departed Wakefield Trinity by mutual consent, to return to Australia.

=== International career ===
In 2022 Bain was named in the Scotland squad for the 2021 Rugby League World Cup.
