= Kyle Pickering =

Italy international rugby league footballer

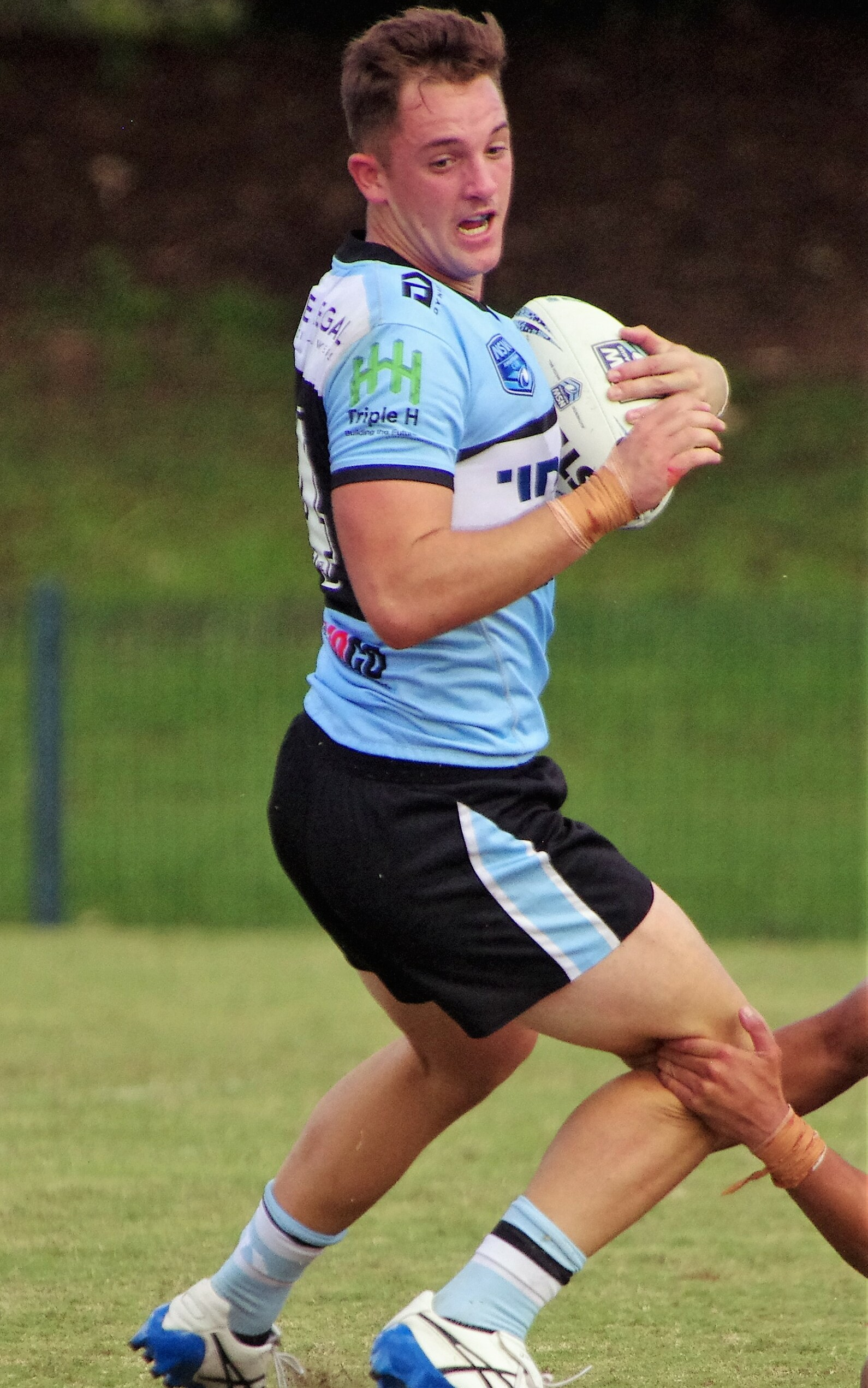

Personal information
- Full name: Kyle Pickering
- Born: 2001 (age 23–24)
- Height: 188 cm (6 ft 2 in)
- Weight: 96 kg (212 lb; 15 st 2 lb)

Playing information
- Position: Second-row, Centre, Five-eighth, Wing
Representative
Years	Team	Pld	T	G	FG	P
2022–	Italy	2	0	0	0	0
- Source: As of 28 October 2023

Kyle Pickering (born 2001) is an Italy international rugby league footballer who played as a Half, Centre, second row for the Cronulla-Sutherland Sharks is currently playing for the Newtown Jets in the NSW Cup position second row.

== Background ==
Pickering was born in Sydney, Australia but is of Italian descent.

== Playing career ==
=== Club career ===
Pickering came through the youth system at the Cronulla Sharks, playing in the S.G. Ball Cup side in 2020, and the Jersey Flegg Cup side in 2020 and 2021.

=== International career ===
In 2022, Pickering was named in the Italy squad for the 2021 Rugby League World Cup.
