= Radean Robinson =

Italy international rugby league footballer

Personal information
- Full name: Radean Robinson
- Born: 9 September 1998 (age 28) Rockhampton, Queensland, Australia
- Height: 183 cm (6 ft 0 in)
- Weight: 87 kg (13 st 10 lb)

Playing information
- Position: Five-eighth, Halfback
Club
Years	Team	Pld	T	G	FG	P
2024–25	Saint-Gaudens Bears	11	8	0	1	0
2025	Toulouse Olympique	7	4	0	0	8
	Total	18	12	0	1	8
Representative
Years	Team	Pld	T	G	FG	P
2022–	Italy	3	1	0	0	0
- Source: As of 20 October 2025

Radean Robinson (born 9 September 1998) is an Italy international rugby league footballer who plays as a five-eighth or halfback for Villefranche XIII Aveyron in the Super XIII.

He previously played for the Toulouse Olympique in the Super League and the Central Queensland Capras and the Souths Logan Magpies in the Queensland Cup.

== Background ==
Robinson was born in Rockhampton, Queensland, Australia. He is of Italian and Indigenous Australian descent.

== Playing career ==
=== Club career ===
From 2020 to 2022 Robinson played in 35 games, and scored 11 tries for the Central Queensland Capras in the Queensland Cup. In late 2022, he signed a deal with the Dolphins for the 2023 NRL season. However it was later announced by Souths Logan Magpies, he would be joining them instead for the 2023 Queensland Cup season.

=== Toulouse Olympique ===
On 30 April 2024 it was reported that he had signed for Toulouse Olympique in the RFL Championship

On 20 October 2025 it was reported that he had left Toulouse Olympique

=== International career ===
In 2022, Robinson was named in the Italy squad for the 2021 Rugby League World Cup.
