= Gioele Celerino =

Italy international rugby league footballer

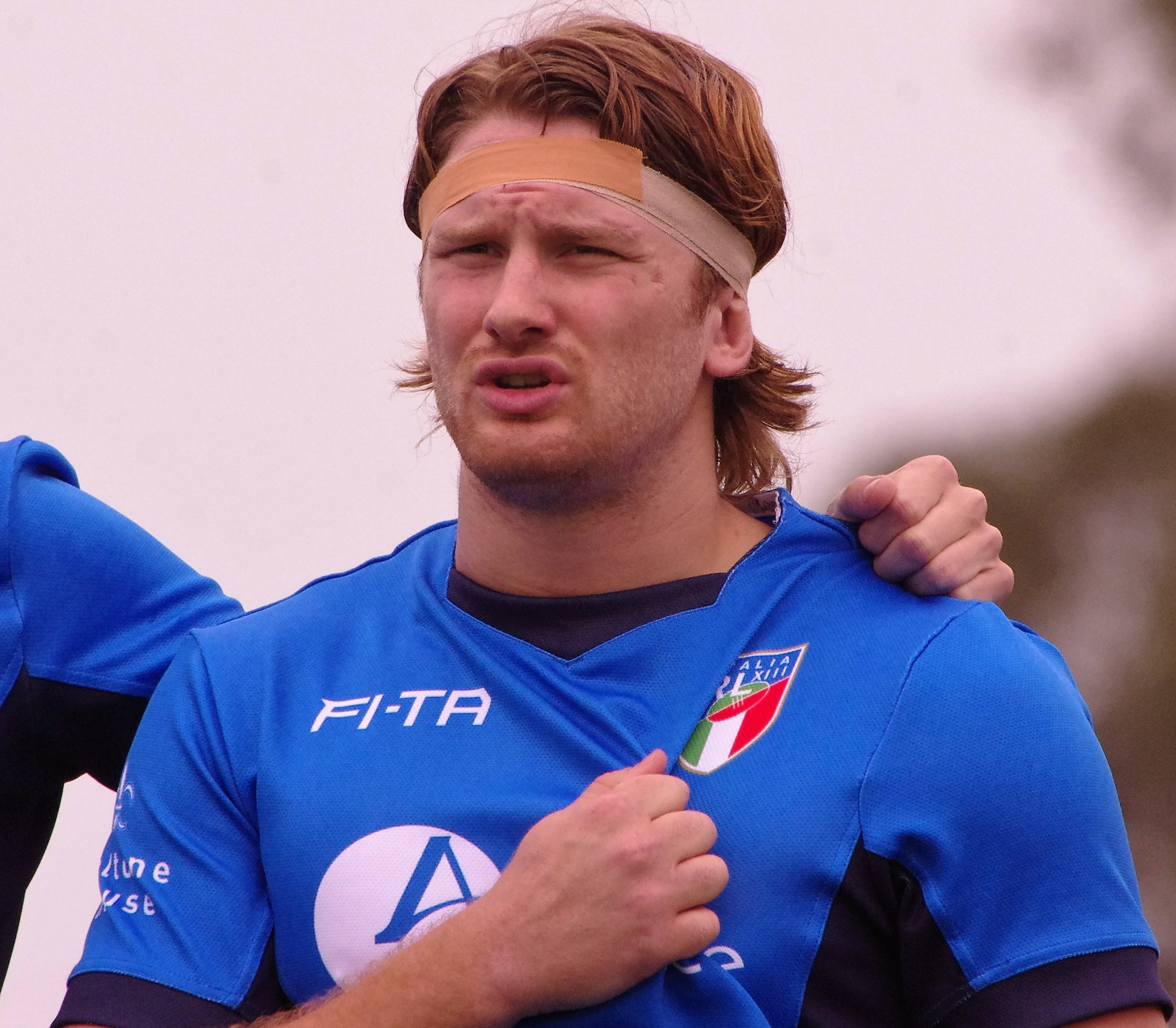

Personal information
- Born: 4 October 1993 (age 33) Asti, Piedmont, Italy
- Height: 6 ft 2 in (1.87 m)
- Weight: 15 st 10 lb (100 kg)

Playing information
- Position: Second-row, Loose forward
Club
Years	Team	Pld	T	G	FG	P
2013	North West Roosters	3	1	0	0	4
2016	Newcastle Thunder	3	1	0	0	4
2019	West Wales Raiders	10	0	0	0	0
2019–21	Palau Broncos	24	2	0	0	8
2021–	Saint-Gaudens Bears	16	0	0	0	0
	Total	56	4	0	0	16
Representative
Years	Team	Pld	T	G	FG	P
2013–	Italy	21	9	1	0	38

Coaching information
Representative
Years	Team	Gms	W	D	L	W%
2024–	Italy	2	1	0	1	50
- Source: As of 19 October 2026

Gioele Celerino (born 4 October 1993) is an Italian professional rugby league footballer who plays for the Saint-Gaudens Bears in the Elite One Championship and Italy at international level.

Primarily playing as a second-row, he was a member of Italy's 2013 and 2017 World Cup squads.

== Playing career ==
At the time of the 2013 World Cup, Celerino was playing for the North West Roosters. He was the only Italian-born player selected in the World Cup squad, and one of only two players selected from the Italian domestic competition (alongside Fabrizio Ciaurro). Celerino did not feature in a World Cup match, but did play in Italy's non-Test friendly against England prior to the start of the tournament.

On 25 January 2016, it was announced that Celerino had signed with the semi-professional Newcastle Thunder in England's third-tier League 1 competition.

In July 2017, Celerino moved to Australia to play with the Tully Tigers in the amateur Cairns District Rugby League. In October 2017, Celerino was named in Italy's squad for the 2017 World Cup. In 2018, Celerino joined his Italian teammate Terry Campese at the Queanbeyan Blues.

International statistics
#	Date	Opponents	Competition	Try	Pts
1	29 Jun 2013	Russia	2012–13 European Shield	1	4
2	27 Jul 2013	Germany	2012–13 European Shield	1	4
3	14 Sep 2013	Serbia	2012–13 European Shield	1	4
4	5 Jul 2014	Ukraine	2014–15 European Championship B	0	0
5	20 Sep 2014	Serbia	2014–15 European Championship B	1	4
6	20 Jun 2015	Serbia	2014–15 European Championship B	0	0
7	18 Jul 2015	Ukraine	2014–15 European Championship B	1	4
8	12 Sep 2015	Russia	2014–15 European Championship B	0	0
9	12 Jun 2016	Lebanon	2016 Mediterranean Cup	0	0
10	3 Sep 2016	Ireland		0	0
11	22 Oct 2016	Serbia	2017 World Cup qualifying	0	0
12	29 Oct 2016	Wales	2017 World Cup qualifying	0	0
13	4 Nov 2016	Russia	2017 World Cup qualifying	1	4
14	3 Jun 2017	Lebanon	2017 Mediterranean Cup	0	0
15	10 Jun 2017	Spain		3	14
16	8 Oct 2017	Malta		0	0

== Coaching ==
On 28 September 2024 it was reported that he had taken up the role of head-coach for Italy
