= Fabrizio Ciaurro =

Italy international rugby league footballer

Personal information
- Born: 20 January 1989 (age 37) Cordoba, Argentina

Playing information
- Position: Fullback, Wing
Club
Years	Team	Pld	T	G	FG	P
2013	Coventry Bears
Representative
Years	Team	Pld	T	G	FG	P
2011–15	Italy	8	4	0	0	16
- Source: As of 16 January 2021

Fabrizio Ciaurro is an Argentine born-Italian rugby league player who represented Italy in the 2013 Rugby League World Cup.

== Playing career ==
He played for the Tirreno Sharks in Italy as a fullback and also spent some time in England with the Coventry Bears.
