= Ethan Natoli =

Italy international rugby league footballer

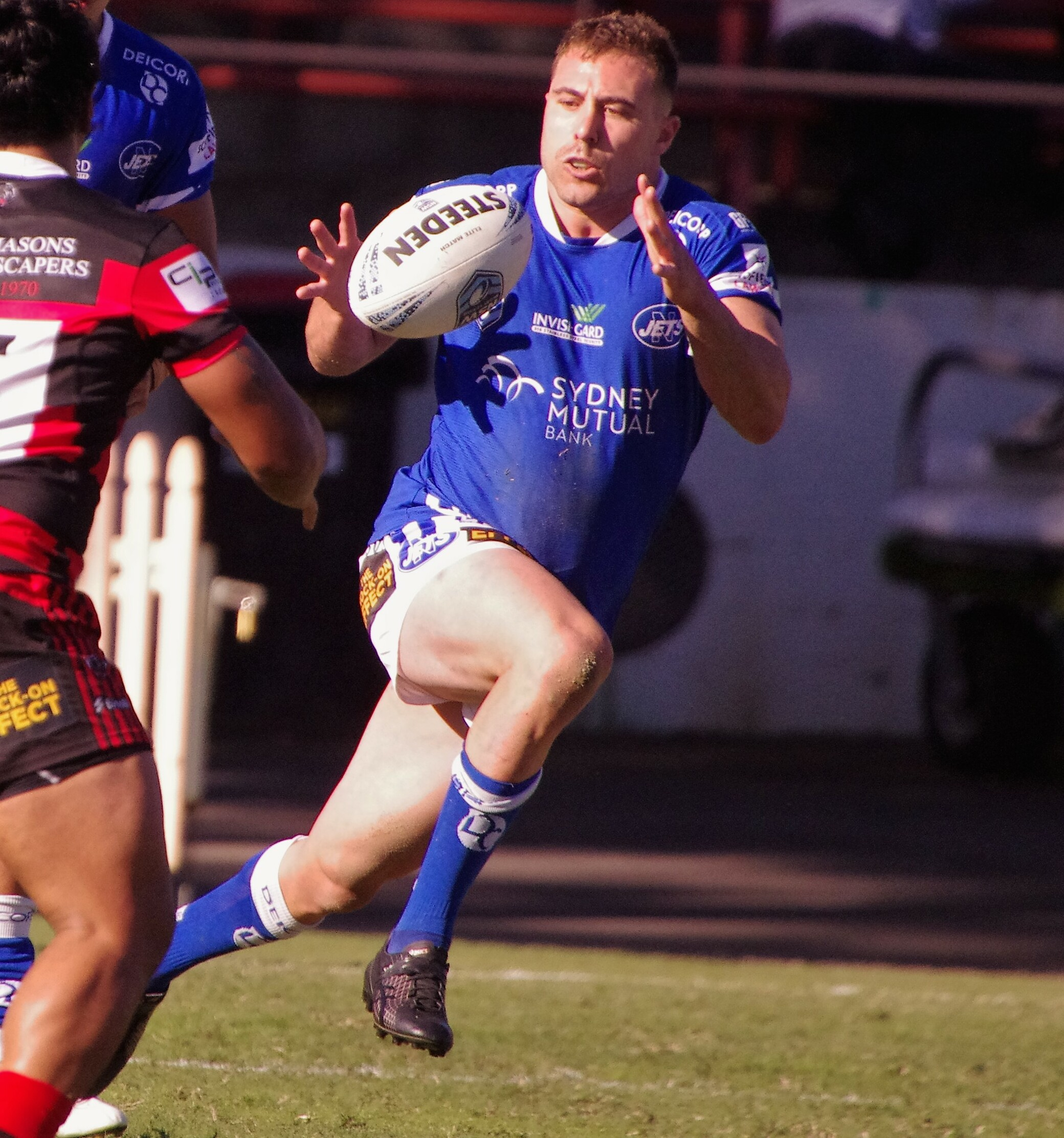

Personal information
- Full name: Ethan Natoli
- Born: 5 April 1995 (age 31) Sydney, New South Wales, Australia
- Height: 5 ft 10 in (1.77 m)
- Weight: 15 st 10 lb (100 kg)

Playing information
- Position: Second-row, Centre
Club
Years	Team	Pld	T	G	FG	P
2023–24	London Broncos	48	5	0	0	20
2024–25	Pia XIII Baroudeur	17	2	0	0	10
2025	London Broncos	15	5	0	0	20
2025–	Pia XIII Baroudeur	7	2	0	0	0
	Total	87	14	0	0	50
Representative
Years	Team	Pld	T	G	FG	P
2017–	Italy	8	0	0	0	0
- Source: As of 18 May 2025

Ethan Natoli (born 5 April 1995) is an Italy international rugby league footballer who plays as a centre, loose forward or winger for Pia XIII Baroudeur in the Super XIII.

He previously played for the London Broncos in the Super League and Championship, and the Newtown Jets in the NSW Cup.

== Background ==
Natoli is of Italian descent.

== Playing career ==
=== Club career ===
Natoli previously played for the Auburn Warriors in the Ron Massey Cup.

=== Baroudeurs de Pia XIII ===
On 6 Aug 2024 it was reported that he had signed for Baroudeurs de Pia XIII in the Super XIII

=== London Broncos (re-join) ===
On 17 May 2025 it was reported that he had re-joined London Broncos in the RFL Championship until the end of the 2025 season.

=== International career ===
In 2022, Natoli was named in the Italy squad for the 2021 Rugby League World Cup.
