= Leo Epifania =

Australian former rugby league footballer

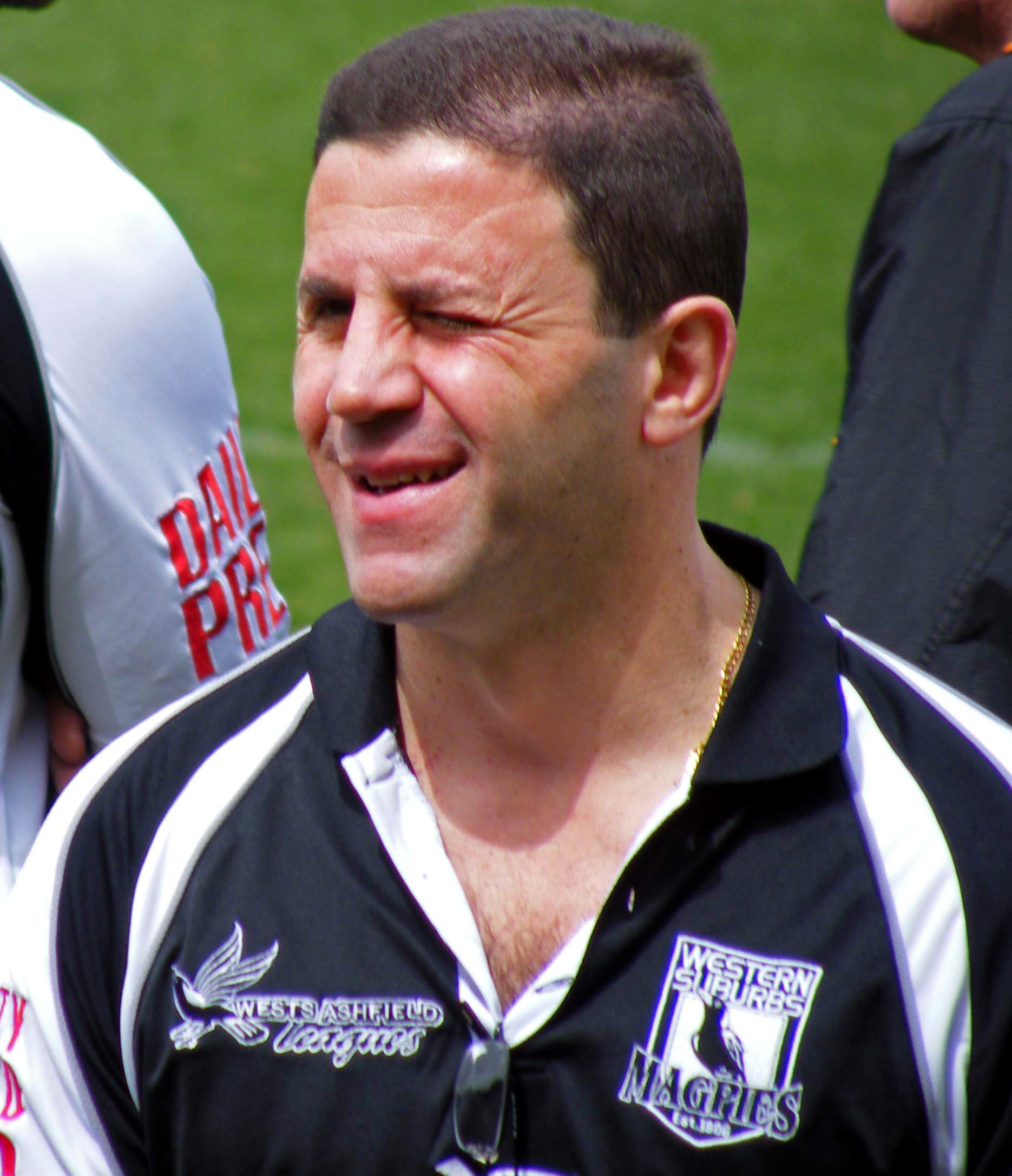

Personal information
- Full name: Leo Epifania
- Born: 23 October 1963 (age 62)

Playing information
- Position: Fullback, Wing
Club
Years	Team	Pld	T	G	FG	P
1984–86	Western Suburbs	23	2	12	0	32
1988	Illawarra Steelers	1	0	1	0	2
	Total	24	2	13	0	34

Coaching information
Club
Years	Team	Gms	W	D	L	W%
2001–02	York Wasps	25	15	0	10	60
Representative
Years	Team	Gms	W	D	L	W%
2016–17	Italy	2	0	1	1	0
2018–	Italy	10	5	0	5	50
- Source: As of 19 October 2025

Leo 'Ledge' Epifania (born 23 October 1963) is an Australian professional rugby league coach who is the head coach of Italy and a former professional rugby league footballer who played in the 1980s as a fullback or winger in the NSWRL Premiership for the Western Suburbs Magpies and Illawarra Steelers.

He played, he later coached the York Wasps in the Northern Ford Premiership., and As of 2015 he is the general manager of the Western Suburbs Magpies in the New South Wales Cup.

He was assistant coach of the Italian National Rugby League team during the 2016 world Cup Qualifiers in Europe against Serbia, Wales and Russia.

In 2017 he coached the Italian National Rugby League team against Malta for a draw and then was in charge of the Italian team which played in 2018 against South Africa (Italy 18–South Africa 8) and Niue (Italy 36–32).

In 2019 he coached the Italian National Rugby League team to successful qualification for the 2021 Rugby League World Cup.

In 2025 he was appointed to the board of the Wests Tigers.
