= Luke Hodge (rugby league) =

Italy international rugby league footballer

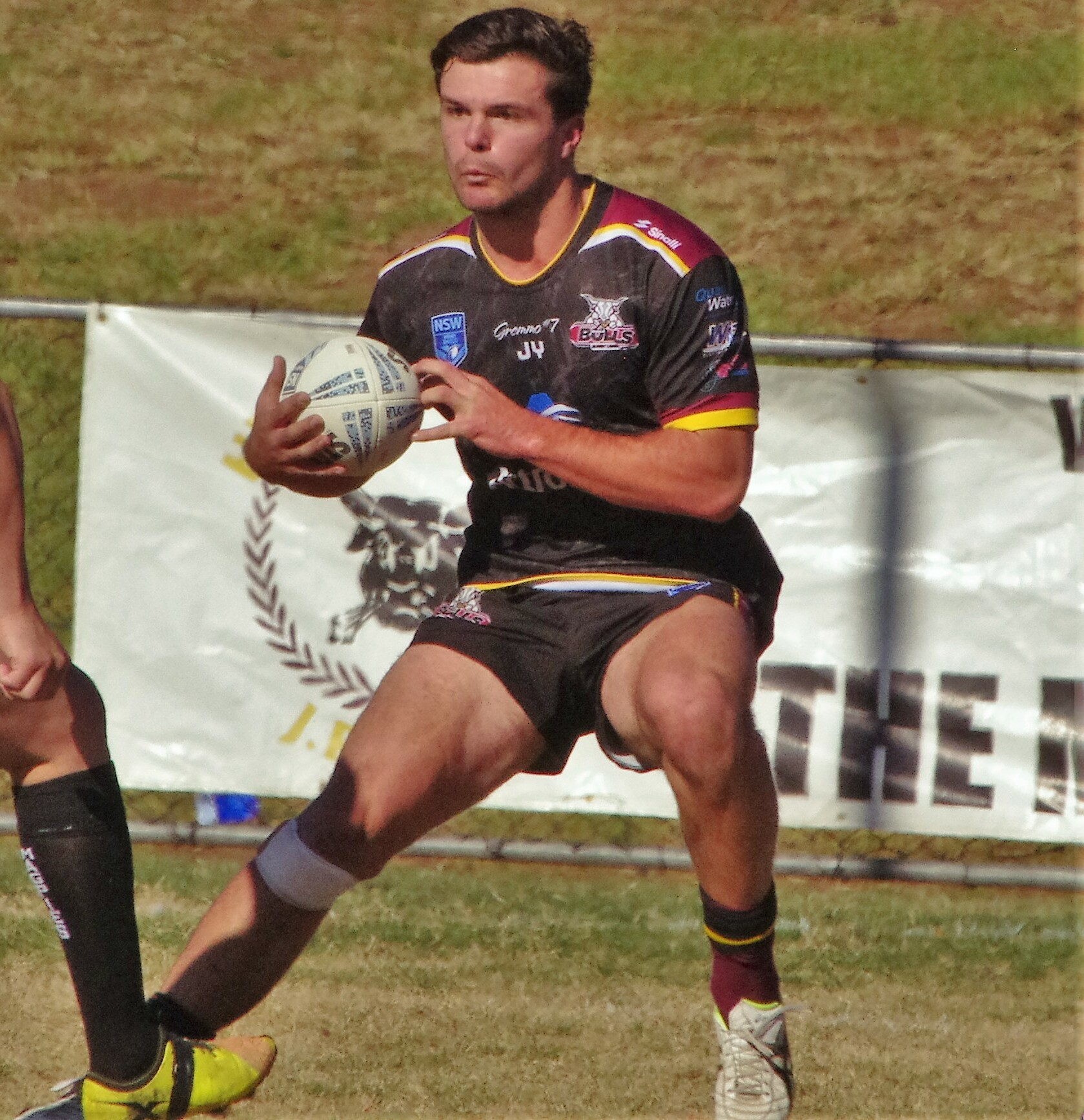

Personal information
- Full name: Luke Hodge
- Born: 28 November 1999 (age 25); Australia,

Playing information
- Position: Second-row, Five-eighth
Representative
Years	Team	Pld	T	G	FG	P
2019–	Italy	4	0	0	0	0
- Source: As of 28 October 2023

Luke Hodge is an Italy international rugby league footballer who plays as a second-row forward for the Blacktown Workers Sea Eagles in the NSW Cup.

== Background ==
Hodge is of Italian descent.

== Playing career ==
=== Club career ===
Hodge previously played for the North Sydney Bears in the NSW Cup.

=== International career ===
In 2022, Hodge was named in the Italy squad for the 2021 Rugby League World Cup.
