= Italy national rugby league team =

National sports team

Italia

Team information
- Nickname: Azzurri
- Governing body: Federazione Italiana Rugby League
- Region: Europe
- Head coach: Gioele Celerino; Leo Epifania
- Captain: Dominic Biondi
- Most caps: Gioele Celerino (22)
- Top try-scorer: Richard Lepori (12) (Note: Correct as of 22 November 2017. See List of Italy national rugby league team players for more details.)
- Top point-scorer: Josh Mantellato (132)
- Home stadium: Stadio Plebiscito
- IRL ranking: 18th

Uniforms
First colours

Team results
- First game
- Wigan 49–28 Italy (Central Park, Wigan; 26 August 1950)
- First international
- Italy 15–37 Australia (Stadio Euganeo, Padua; 23 January 1960)
- Biggest win
- Italy 94–4 Spain (Campo Sportivo Manta, Saluzzo; 10 June 2017)
- Biggest defeat
- Italy 0–104 Scotland (Stadio Plebiscito, Padua; 17 October 2009)
- World Cup
- Appearances: 3 (first time in 2013)
- Best result: Group stage (2013, 2017, 2021)

The Italy national rugby league team represents Italy in rugby league football. With origins dating back to the 1950s and 1960s, the team has competed regularly in international competitions since 2008, when their current governing body, the Federazione Italiana Rugby League, was formed. They are currently ranked 17th in the IRL World Rankings.

== History ==
In 1950, a team from Turin toured the North of England. Italy later started a domestic competition. A year later the first official match of the Italy national team took place in Cahors, France. Italy lost 29–17 although the Azzurri ended the first half leading 10–7.

Sixteen official matches were played against English teams in the season 1952–53, as well as a triangular tournament between Italy, France and England.

In 1958, in Treviso under the Italian Federation of Amateur Rugby 13 (FIAR 13) was formed and was recognised by the Rugby Football League. With this recognition and funding from England, the sport of rugby league became popular in Italy. In their first year, the FIAR had 24 clubs and 620 players.

In 1960, Italy played Australia in two international matches held in Italy, the results were 37–15 and 67–22 losses. In the late 1960s, threats made by the rugby union governing body, the Italian Rugby Federation, to ban players who played rugby league from their sport killed off the sport in Italy by the 1970s. As a consequence the Italy national team ceased to exist.

In the mid-1990s the team were revived by two Italian-Australians, Domenic Pezzano and John Benigni, known as 'The Italian Rugby League A XIII' (IRL A XIII) was formed in 1993. Pezzano coached Italy in the Coca-Cola Rugby League World Sevens in Australia with the team being predominantly players from Italy and one Italo-Australian player captained the team – Orazio D'Arrò in this tournament, Pezzano also coached the Italian team that participated in the first ever Super League World Nines tournament which was hosted by Fiji, that team was made up of Italian players, Italian Origin players and included 1st Graders such as Dean Schifilliti, Mark Corvo, Luke Davico and Italian dual international Orazio Arancio.

After that event, the Italia Rugby League began competing in various international tournaments, such as the Super League rugby league nines tournament in Fiji, World Sevens, St.Marys Sevens, Wollongong Sevens and the Mediterranean Cup in 1999. They attempted to qualify for the 2000 Rugby League World Cup and ended up in the Rugby League Emerging Nations Tournament in which they were runners-up to British Amateur Rugby League Association.

In 2002, the Azzurri were back playing internationals in Italy with a triangular tournament featuring Scotland and Russia. Italy lost to Tatarstan of Russia but tied their second game with Scotland 16 all. In 2003 Italy played Scotland again and contested the Ionio Cup against Greece, which they won.

Former Italy logo

In 2006, Italy played three matches, two against South Africa and one against British Amateur Rugby League Association.

The Federazione of Italia Rugby League was officially moved to the "official observer" status by the Rugby League European Federation from an unranked position on 15 April 2008.

Italy won the RLEF European Shield in 2008 and 2009, and as such were drafted into the 2009 European Cup following Russia's withdrawal from the tournament. During this tournament, Italy were handed their record defeat by Scotland, but they did manage to record one victory, over Serbia at The Old Parish in Maesteg, Wales.

In Autumn 2010 Italy embarked on a short tour of Wales, culminating in a match in Wrexham on 6 October in which they faced Wales for the first time in a full Rugby League international. The Italian side obtained a remarkable 13–6 victory, the first against a national team of the British Isles.

=== 2013 World Cup qualifying ===
In 2011, Italy contested the qualifying tournament for the 2013 Rugby League World Cup, competing against Russia, Serbia and Lebanon. Coached by Carlo Napolitano and captained by Anthony Minichiello, Italy's draw with Lebanon was enough for them to gain the 14th and final place in the 2013 World Cup.

=== 2013 World Cup ===
19 October 2013	England	14 – 15	Italy	AJ Bell Stadium, City of Salford
	Tries: Tomkins (2), Ablett; Goals: Widdop	[Report Report]	Tries: Laffranchi, Parata; Goals: Mantellato (2), Nasso; Drop goals: Mantellato	Attendance: 4,382; Referee: Richard Silverwood (England)

Italy defeated England 15–14 in an unranked pre-tournament match, which was described as a "humiliating" loss for England. The Italian team led 12–4 during the first half before England's Sam Tomkins scored two tries. Ray Nasso kicked a penalty goal in the 70th minute to level the scores, and Josh Mantellato kicked a drop goal in the 79th minute of the game to reclaim the lead for Italy.

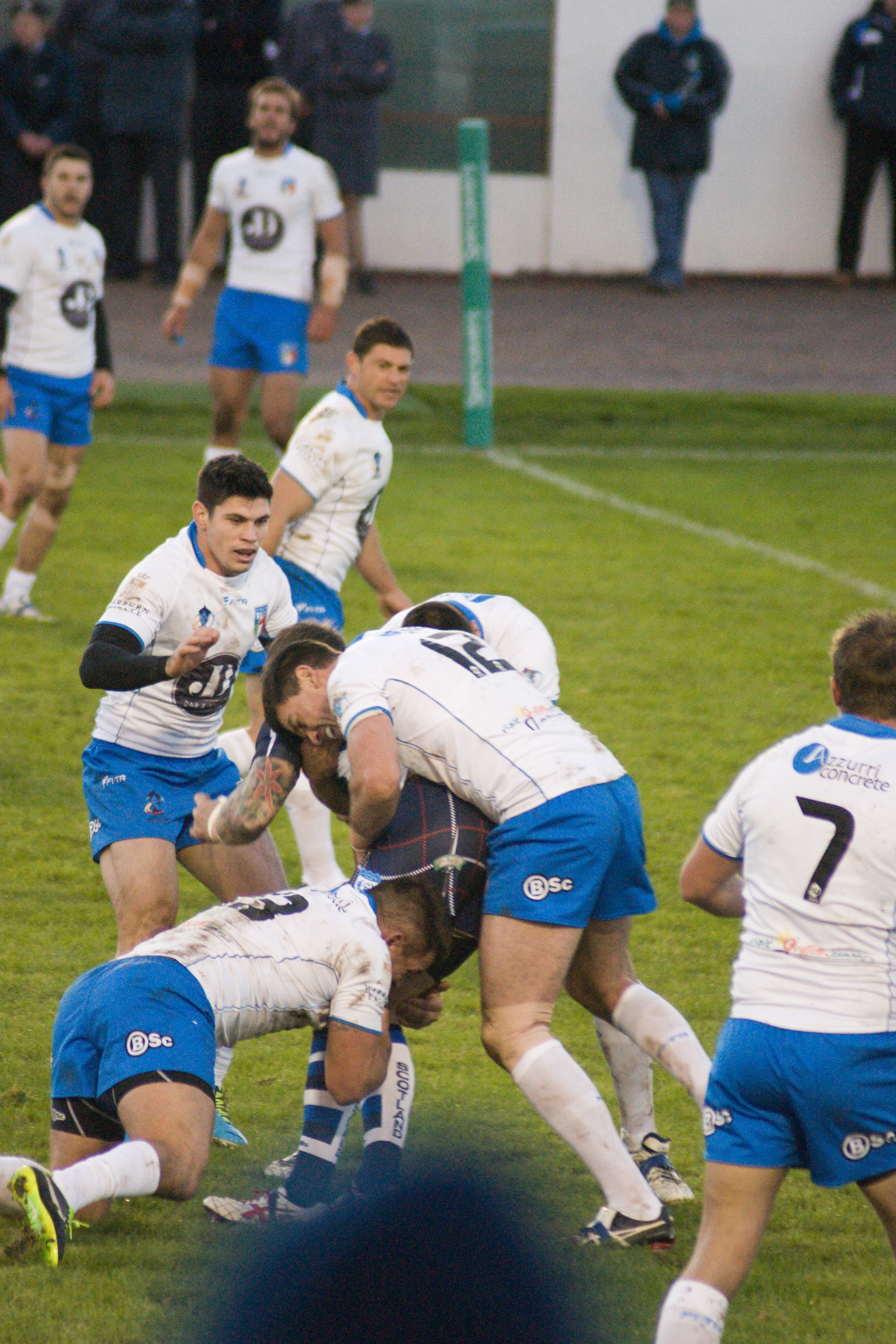
The Italian team playing in their second kit against Scotland in the 2013 World Cup

Italy were drawn in Pool C alongside Scotland, Tonga and they also played an inter-group match against co-hosts Wales. Their tournament began with an upset victory over the co-hosts at Cardiff's Millennium Stadium. In their second match, the 'Azzuri' took on Scotland who were coming off an upset win of their own against Tonga. The match turned out to be a thriller and it was tight with a high scoring draw being the result. Italy then had to just win their last pool match against Tonga after Scotland won their match and finished their pool-stage campaign with the same points differential the Italians were currently on. Tonga had nothing but pride to play for after their hopes of qualification had vanished but they shocked Napolitano's men by keeping them scoreless and therefore eliminating Italy from having any chance to play in the 2013 World Cup knockout round.

=== 2017 World Cup qualifying ===
Italy participated in the qualification for the 2017 Rugby League World Cup. The first stage of qualifying involved having to finish in the top 3 in their 2014–15 European Shield competition. Italy only managed to secure qualification for the 'final qualification tournament' after winning their second to last game against bottom placed Ukraine. Italy finished the Shield in third place with 3 wins and 3 defeats in six matches.

The final qualification tournament consisted of 6 teams - the top three teams from the European B tournament, the winners of the European C tournament and seeded nations Wales and Ireland. The tournament featured two groups of three teams playing in a single round-robin format. The winners of each group qualified for the World Cup, while the runners-up faced each other in a play-off match on 5 November 2016 to determine the final spot. A seeded draw took place to determine the groups on 5 November 2015. Italy are placed in Group A alongside European B tournament champions Serbia, and Wales.

=== 2021 Rugby League World Cup ===
Italy started off their World Cup campaign with a 28-4 victory over Scotland. This was followed by heavy defeats against Fiji and Australia which left Italy third in the group which meant their elimination from the tournament.

=== 2026 Rugby League World Cup ===
In 2024, it was announced that Italy would be denied entry to the 2026 World Cup after having their membership status dropped to ‘affiliate’ level, along with three other nations.

== Identity ==
Italy's kit suppliers are New Balance.

2013 World Cup Jersey; Home Kit	2013 World Cup Jersey; Away Kit

== Players ==
=== Current squad ===
Squad selected for the 2025 Rugby League European Championships.

Name	Club	Games	Points
Dominic Biondi	(Australia) Wynnum Manly Seagulls	4	8
Davide Colla	(Italy) Lupi del Nord	2	0
Alessandro Corte	(Italy) Lupi del Nord	2	0
Andrea Gallinaro	(Italy) Lupi del Nord	0	0
Nic Lenaz	(Australia) North Queensland Cowboys	3	4
Jackson Lenzo	(Australia) Western Clydesdales	1	8
Andrea Marchica	(Italy) Lupi del Nord	0	0
Damian Nati	(Australia) Hills District Bulls	2	10
Antonio Obasi	(England) Hull University	0	0
Emanuele Passera	(Italy) XIII del Ducato	9	8
Jack Piccirilli	(Australia) Dapto Canaries	3	28
Leonard Plati	(Australia) Wests Tigers	1	0
Mattia Saoncella	(Italy) Lupi del Nord	1	0
Ryan Soldà	(Italy) Lupi del Nord	0	0
Francesco Speggiorin	(Italy) Lupi del Nord	1	0
George Stamatatos	(Australia) Ryde Eastwood Hawks	1	0
Ikenna Michele Ugwo	(England) Leeds Beckett University	0	0
Francesco Vallone	(Italy) Lupi del Nord	2	0
Lorenzo Vizzolo	(Italy) Lupi del Nord	0	0

=== Notable representatives ===
The following is a list of Italian representative players who have played 50 more or matches in a professional rugby league competition i.e. the National Rugby League and/or the Super League:

- Daniel Alvaro
- Nathan Brown
- Terry Campese
- Mason Cerruto
- Cameron Ciraldo
- Aidan Guerra
- Anthony Laffranchi
- Josh Mantellato
- Anthony Minichiello
- Mark Minichiello
- Joel Riethmuller
- Brenden Santi
- Kade Snowden
- James Tedesco
- Paul Vaughan
- Paul Franze
- Shannon Donato
- David Penna
- Mark Corvo
- Luke Davico

== Competitive record ==
=== All-time record ===
Italy's competitive record as of 07 October 2023

Against	Played	Won	Drawn	Lost	Win %	For	Aga	Diff
Australia	3	0	0	3	0%	43	170	–127
(United Kingdom) BARLA	1	0	0	1	0%	18	20	–2
Canada	1	1	0	0	100%	66	6	+60
Czech Republic	2	2	0	0	100%	76	26	+50
England	1	1	0	0	100%	15	14	+1
Fiji	2	0	0	2	0%	14	98	–84
France	1	1	0	0	100%	14	10	+4
Germany	4	4	0	0	100%	238	96	+142
Greece	3	2	0	1	66.67%	98	72	+26
Ireland	3	0	0	3	0%	42	121	–79
Lebanon	8	1	1	6	12.5%	99	229	–130
Malta	4	2	1	1	50%	82	44	+38
Morocco	2	1	0	1	50%	44	32	+12
Niue	1	1	0	0	100%	36	32	+4
Philippines	1	1	0	0	100%	46	16	+30
Russia	6	4	0	2	66.67%	252	100	+152
Scotland	3	1	1	1	33.33%	58	138	–80
Serbia	8	4	0	4	50%	230	196	+34
Spain	2	2	0	0	100%	128	8	+100
South Africa	3	1	0	2	33.33%	44	144	–100
Tonga	1	0	0	1	0%	0	16	–16
Ukraine	2	2	0	0	100%	94	24	+70
United States	3	3	0	0	100%	120	22	+98
Wales	3	2	0	1	66.67%	59	42	+17
Total	68	36	3	29	52.94%	1950	1701	+249

=== Competitions ===
The Italian team has competed in the following matches and tournaments since the reintroduction of rugby league to the country in the 1990s:

- World Sevens in 1995, 1997, plus the qualification tournament in 2003
- Superleague World Nines in 1996
- Emerging Nations Tournament in 2000
- Ionio Cup vs Greece in 2003 and 2004
- St.Mary's World Sevens - Australia
- Wollongong Sevens - Australia
- Columbus Cup vs United States in 2006
- Australian-Mediterranean Shield in 2009
- World Cup qualifying for the 2000 tournament

Since 2008, Italy has competed in the following Test match tournaments:

- European Shield in 2008, 2009, and 2012–13
- European Cup in 2009
- World Cup in 2013 and 2017, and their respective qualifying tournaments held in 2011 and 2016

== IRL Rankings ==
IRL Men's World Rankings
Official rankings as of August 2026
Rank	Change	Team	Pts %
1	Steady	Australia	100
2	Steady	New Zealand	82
3	Steady	Tonga	70
4	Steady	Samoa	56
5	Steady	England	54
6	Steady	Papua New Guinea	47
7	Steady	Fiji	34
8	▲1	Cook Islands	24
9	▲2	Netherlands	23
10	▲2	Ukraine	21
11	▼3	France	21
12	▼2	Serbia	20
13	Steady	Wales	18
14	Steady	Ireland	17
15	Steady	Greece	14
16	Steady	Malta	14
17	▲12	Canada	13
18	▼1	Italy	11
19	▼1	Jamaica	9
20	▲7	Scotland	8
21	▲1	United States	8
22	▼3	Poland	7
23	▼3	Lebanon	7
24	▼1	Germany	7
25	▼1	Czech Republic	6
26	▼5	Norway	6
27	▼2	Chile	5
28	▲2	Philippines	5
29	▼1	South Africa	4
30	Steady	Brazil	3
31	Steady	Morocco	3
32	▲1	Argentina	3
33	▲2	Ghana	2
34	▲2	Kenya	2
35	▼1	Montenegro	2
36	▲1	Nigeria	2
37	▼5	North Macedonia	1
38	Steady	Albania	1
39	Steady	Turkey	1
40	Steady	Bulgaria	1
41	Steady	Cameroon	0
42	Steady	Japan	0
43	Steady	Spain	0
44	Steady	Colombia	0
45	Steady	Russia	0
46	Steady	El Salvador	0
47	Steady	Bosnia and Herzegovina	0
48	Steady	Hong Kong	0
49	Steady	Solomon Islands	0
50	Steady	Vanuatu	0
51	Steady	Hungary	0
52	Steady	Latvia	0
53	Steady	Denmark	0
54	Steady	Belgium	0
55	Steady	Estonia	0
56	Steady	Sweden	0
57	Steady	Niue	0
Complete rankings at www.internationalrugbyleague.com

== See also ==
- Rugby league in Italy
- Italy women's national rugby league team
- Italy national rugby union team
