= 2017 Rugby League World Cup inter-group matches =

The 2017 Rugby League World Cup inter-group matches were three matches played between teams in Group C and Group D of the 2017 Rugby League World Cup. Both groups C and D have only 3 teams in comparison to Group A and Group B, so in order for all teams to play 3 matches, teams across the two groups played each other.

== Ireland vs Italy ==
29 October 2017
14:00 AEDT (UTC+10)

Ireland	36–12	Italy
Tries: Liam Kay (3', 30') 2 George King (10') 1 Kyle Amor (55') 1 Michael Morgan (60') 1 Louie McCarthy-Scarsbrook (79') 1 Goals: Liam Finn 6/7 (4', 11', 18' pen, 31', 56', 61')	Report	Tries: 1 (38') Justin Castellaro; 1 (47') Nathan Milone; Goals: 2/2 Josh Mantellato (39', 48')

Barlow Park, Cairns
Attendance: 9,216
Referee: Grant Atkins (Australia)
Player of the Match: Liam Finn (Ireland)

Team lists:

FB	1	Scott Grix
WG	2	Shannon McDonnell
CE	3	Ed Chamberlain
CE	4	Michael Morgan
WG	5	Liam Kay
FE	6	Api Pewhairangi
HB	7	Liam Finn
PR	8	Brad Singleton
HK	9	Michael McIlorum
PR	10	Kyle Amor
SR	11	Louie McCarthy-Scarsbrook
SR	12	Oliver Roberts
LK	13	George King
Substitutes:
IC	14	Tyrone McCarthy
IC	15	James Hasson
IC	16	Joe Philbin
IC	17	Anthony Mullally
Coach:
Mark Aston

FB	1	James Tedesco
WG	2	Mason Cerruto
CE	3	Justin Castellaro
CE	4	Nathan Milone
WG	5	Josh Mantellato
FE	9	Ryan Ghietti
HB	7	Jack Johns
PR	8	Paul Vaughan
HK	14	Colin Wilkie
PR	10	Daniel Alvaro
SR	11	Joel Riethmuller
SR	12	Mark Minichiello (c)
LK	13	Nathan Brown
Substitutes:
IC	15	Brendan Santi
IC	16	Shannon Wakeman
IC	17	Jayden Walker
IC	18	Joey Tramontana
Coach:
Cameron Ciraldo

Notes:

- Due to high humidity conditions, the game was played with quarter-time drinks breaks after the heat rule was invoked.

== Fiji vs Wales ==
5 November 2017
18:30 AEDT (UTC+10)

Fiji	72–6	Wales
Tries: Suliasi Vunivalu (14', 51', 61') 3 Viliame Kikau (22', 40') 2 Taane Milne (31', 56') 2 Eloni Vunakece (6') 1 Henry Raiwalui (16') 1 Salesi Fainga'a (27') 1 Marcelo Montoya (33') 1 Jarryd Hayne (42') 1 Joe Lovodua (65') 1 Ben Nakubuwai (70') 1 Goals: Apisai Koroisau 4/7 (7', 17', 23', 28'); Taane Milne 3/5 (40', 43', 52'); Suliasi Vunivalu 1/2 (66')	Report	Tries: 1 (11') Morgan Knowles; Goals: 1/1 Courtney Davies (12')

Townsville Stadium, Townsville
Attendance: 7,732
Referee: Chris Kendall (England)
Player of the Match: Akuila Uate (Fiji)

Team lists:

FB	1	Kevin Naiqama (c)
WG	2	Suliasi Vunivalu
CE	3	Taane Milne
CE	4	Akuila Uate
WG	5	Marcelo Montoya
FE	6	Jarryd Hayne
HB	7	Henry Raiwalui
PR	8	Ashton Sims
HK	9	Apisai Koroisau
PR	10	Eloni Vunakece
SR	11	Viliame Kikau
SR	12	Salesi Junior Fainga'a
LK	13	Tui Kamikamica
Substitutes:
IC	14	Joe Lovodua
IC	15	Jacob Saifiti
IC	16	Junior Roqica
IC	17	Ben Nakubuwai
Coach:
Michael Potter

FB	1	Elliot Kear
RW	2	Rhys Williams
RC	3	Michael Channing
LC	4	Christiaan Roets
LW	5	Regan Grace
FE	6	Courtney Davies
HB	17	Dalton Grant
PR	8	Craig Kopczak (c)
HK	9	Steve Parry
PR	10	Phil Joseph
SR	11	Rhodri Lloyd
SR	12	Joe Burke
LK	13	Morgan Knowles
Substitutes:
IC	7	Danny Ansell
IC	14	Matty Fozard
IC	15	Matt Barron
IC	16	Ben Evans
Coach:
John Kear

== Papua New Guinea vs United States ==
12 November 2017
15:00 AEDT (UTC+10)

Papua New Guinea	64–0	United States
Tries: Justin Olam (12', 66', 75') 3 Lachlan Lam (8', 16') 2 James Segeyaro (14') 1 Rod Griffin (25') 1 Stargroth Amean (39') 1 David Mead (42') 1 Watson Boas (60') 1 Nene Macdonald (63') 1 Goals: Rhyse Martin 10/11 (10', 15', 18', 26', 40', 44', 62', 65', 68', 77')	Report

National Football Stadium, Port Moresby
Attendance: 14,800
Referee: Adam Gee (Australia)
Player of the Match: Lachlan Lam (Papua New Guinea)

Team lists:

FB	1	David Mead (c)
RW	2	Justin Olam
RC	3	Kato Ottio
LC	4	Nene Macdonald
LW	5	Garry Lo
FE	6	Lachlan Lam
HB	7	Watson Boas
PR	8	Moses Meninga
HK	9	James Segeyaro
PR	10	Luke Page
SR	11	Rhyse Martin
SR	18	Rod Griffin
LK	13	Paul Aiton
Substitutes:
IC	14	Kurt Baptiste
IC	15	Stargroth Amean
IC	16	Nixon Put
IC	17	Thompson Teteh
Coach:
Michael Marum

FB	1	Corey Makelim
WG	2	Ryan Burroughs
CE	3	Junior Vaivai
CE	17	Gabriel Farley
WG	5	Bureta Faraimo
FE	6	Kristian Freed
HB	7	Tui Samoa
PR	8	Eddy Pettybourne
HK	9	David Marando
PR	10	Mark Offerdahl (c)
SR	11	Daniel Howard
SR	12	Joe Eichner
LK	18	Stephen Howard
Substitutes:
IC	14	Sam Tochterman-Talbott
IC	16	Martwain Johnston
IC	20	David Ulch
IC	21	Josh Rice
Coach:
Brian McDermott
