= 2017 Rugby League World Cup Group D =

2017 Rugby League World Cup Group D was one of four groups in the 2017 Rugby League World Cup. The group comprised Fiji, United States and Italy. Fiji topped the group and therefore qualified for the 2017 Rugby League World Cup knockout stage.

== Overall ==
Key to colours in pool tables
Advances to knockout stage and qualifies for the 2021 Rugby League World Cup

Pos	Team	Pld	W	D	L	PF	PA	PD	Pts	Qualification
1	Fiji	3	3	0	0	168	28	+140	6	Advance to knockout stage
2	Italy	3	1	0	2	68	74	−6	2	
3	United States	3	0	0	3	12	168	−156	0	

== Fixtures ==
=== Fiji v United States ===
28 October
7:40pm (AEST)

Fiji	58–12	United States
Tries: Taane Milne (3', 11') 2 Kevin Naiqama (7', 30') 2 Suliasi Vunivalu (35', 64') 2 Akuila Uate (14') 1 Kane Evans (17') 1 Jarryd Hayne (46') 1 Viliame Kikau (60') 1 Henry Raiwalui (66') 1 Goals: Apisai Koroisau 5/8 (8', 13', 18', 31', 47'); Taane Milne 2/3 (61', 68')	Report	Tries: 1 (21') Matt Shipway; 1 (72') Junior Vaivai; Goals: 2/2 Bureta Fariamo (22', 74')

Townsville Stadium, Townsville
Attendance: 5,103
Referee: Henry Perenara (New Zealand)
Player of the Match: Kevin Naiqama (Fiji)

Team lists:

FB	1	Kevin Naiqama (c)
WG	2	Suliasi Vunivalu
CE	3	Taane Milne
CE	4	Akuila Uate
WG	5	Marcelo Montoya
FE	6	Jarryd Hayne
HB	7	Henry Raiwalui
PR	8	Ashton Sims
HK	9	Apisai Koroisau
PR	10	Kane Evans
SR	11	Viliame Kikau
SR	18	Brayden Wiliame
LK	13	Tui Kamikamica
Substitutes:
IC	14	Joe Lovodua
IC	15	Jacob Saifiti
IC	16	Eloni Vunakece
IC	17	Ben Nakubuwai
Coach:
Michael Potter

FB	1	Corey Makelim
WG	2	Ryan Burroughs
CE	3	Junior Vaivai
CE	4	Taylor Alley
WG	5	Bureta Faraimo
FE	6	Kristian Freed
HB	11	Daniel Howard
PR	8	Eddy Pettybourne
HK	9	David Marando
PR	10	Mark Offerdahl (c)
SR	16	Stephen Howard
SR	12	Matt Shipway
LK	13	Nick Newlin
Substitutes:
IC	7	Tui Samoa
IC	15	Andrew Kneisly
IC	19	Joe Eichner
IC	21	Josh Rice
Coach:
Brian McDermott

=== Italy v United States ===
5 November
4:00pm (AEST)

Italy	46–0	United States
Tries: Joey Tramontana (8', 37') 2 James Tedesco (14', 43') 2 Josh Mantellato (18') 1 Ryan Ghietti (25') 1 Paul Vaughan (59') 1 Mason Cerruto (73') 1 Goals: Josh Mantellato 7/8 (9', 16', 26', 38', 45', 60', 74')	Report

Townsville Stadium, Townsville
Attendance: 7,732
Referee: Ashley Klein (Australia)
Player of the Match: Joey Tramontana (Italy)

Team lists:

FB	2	Mason Cerruto
WG	14	Chris Centrone
CE	3	Justin Castellaro
CE	4	Nathan Milone
WG	5	Josh Mantellato
FE	1	James Tedesco
HB	7	Ryan Ghietti
PR	8	Paul Vaughan
HK	9	Joey Tramontana
PR	10	Daniel Alvaro
SR	17	Jayden Walker
SR	12	Mark Minichiello (c)
LK	13	Nathan Brown
Substitutes:
IC	11	Joel Riethmuller
IC	15	Brendan Santi
IC	16	Shannon Wakeman
IC	21	Christophe Calegari
Coach:
Cameron Ciraldo

FB	1	Corey Makelim
WG	2	Ryan Burroughs
CE	3	Junior Vaivai
CE	21	Josh Rice
WG	5	Bureta Faraimo
FE	6	Kristian Freed
HB	7	Tui Samoa
PR	8	Eddy Pettybourne
HK	9	David Marando
PR	10	Mark Offerdahl (c)
SR	11	Daniel Howard
SR	12	Matt Shipway
LK	17	Gabriel Farley
Substitutes:
IC	14	Sam Tochterman-Talbott
IC	15	Fotukava Malu
IC	18	CJ Cortalano
IC	20	David Ulch
Coach:
Brian McDermott

=== Fiji v Italy ===
10 November
7:40pm (AEDT)

Fiji	38–10	Italy
Tries: Suliasi Vunivalu (60', 63', 68') 3 Kevin Naiqama (28') 1 Henry Raiwalui (40') 1 Brayden Wiliame (54') 1 Marcelo Montoya (75') 1 Goals: Apisai Koroisau 3/4 (29', 40', 61'); Taane Milne 2/3 (64', 69'); Sin Bins: Jarryd Hayne (34')	Report	Tries: 1 (20') Josh Mantellato; 1 (43') Nathan Milone; Goals: 1/2 Josh Mantellato (44'); Sin Bins: (12') Jayden Walker (34') Joey Tramontana

Canberra Stadium, Canberra
Attendance: 6,733
Referee: Robert Hicks (England)
Player of the Match: Apisai Koroisau (Fiji)

Team lists:

FB	1	Kevin Naiqama (c)
WG	2	Suliasi Vunivalu
CE	3	Taane Milne
CE	4	Akuila Uate
WG	5	Marcelo Montoya
FE	6	Jarryd Hayne
HB	7	Henry Raiwalui
PR	8	Ashton Sims
HK	9	Apisai Koroisau
PR	10	Eloni Vunakece
SR	11	Viliame Kikau
SR	12	Brayden Wiliame
LK	13	Tui Kamikamica
Substitutes:
IC	15	Jacob Saifiti
IC	16	Junior Roqica
IC	17	Ben Nakubuwai
IC	18	James Storer
Coach:
Michael Potter

FB	2	Mason Cerruto
WG	20	Richard Lepori
CE	18	Christophe Calegari
CE	4	Nathan Milone
WG	5	Josh Mantellato
FE	1	James Tedesco
HB	6	Terry Campese
PR	8	Paul Vaughan
HK	9	Joey Tramontana
PR	10	Daniel Alvaro
SR	17	Jayden Walker
SR	12	Mark Minichiello (c)
LK	13	Nathan Brown
Substitutes:
IC	7	Ryan Ghietti
IC	11	Joel Riethmuller
IC	15	Brendan Santi
IC	16	Shannon Wakeman
Coach:
Cameron Ciraldo
