= Josh Rice =

Josh Rice may refer to:

- Josh Rice, band member in The Magic Mushrooms
- J Rice (Josh Rice, born 1988), American pop singer
- Josh Rice (rugby league), former Hawaii Warriors football player and United States rugby league player
