= Adam Doueihi =

Lebanon international rugby league footballer

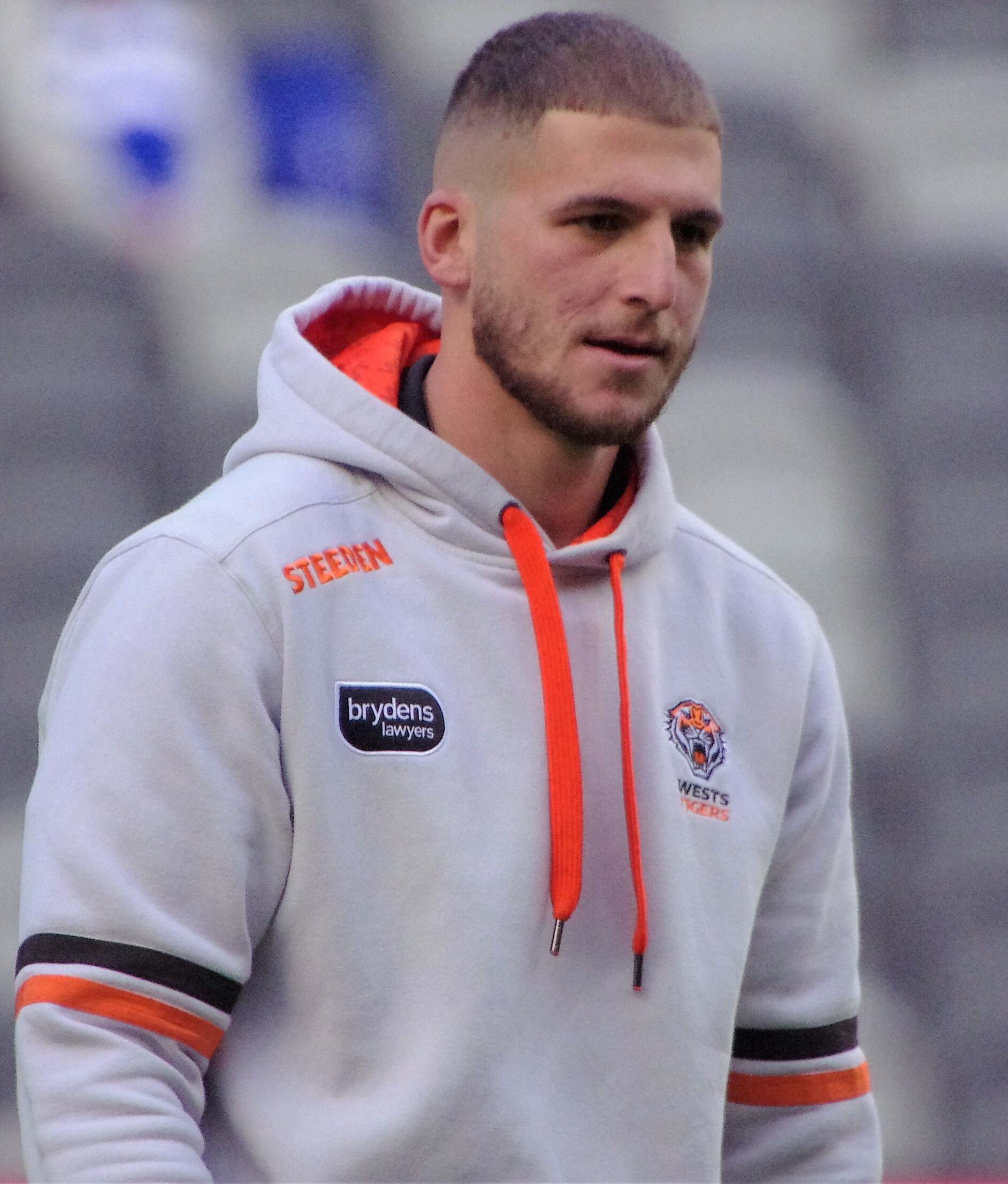

Personal information
- Full name: Adam Doueihi آدم ضحوي
- Born: 5 August 1998 (age 28) Eastwood, New South Wales, Australia
- Height: 190 cm (6 ft 3 in)
- Weight: 97 kg (15 st 4 lb)

Playing information
- Position: Centre, Fullback, Five-eighth, Halfback
Club
Years	Team	Pld	T	G	FG	P
2018–19	South Sydney	30	2	10	0	28
2020–	Wests Tigers	99	35	199	3	541
	Total	129	37	209	3	569
Representative
Years	Team	Pld	T	G	FG	P
2017–22	Lebanon	7	3	4	0	20
- Source: As of 16 August 2026

Adam Doueihi (born 5 August 1998) is a Lebanon international rugby league footballer who plays as a utility for the Wests Tigers in the National Rugby League.

He previously played for the South Sydney Rabbitohs in the NRL, and represented Lebanon in the 2017 Rugby League World Cup. Doueihi is a versatile player who has played across a range of positions most commonly centre and five-eighth. Early in his career, he played as fullback and also has played at halfback, wing and lock within games.

== Early life ==
Doueihi was born in Eastwood, New South Wales, Australia, and is of Lebanese descent through his grandparents, who are from Zgharta.

He played his junior rugby league for the Strathfield Raiders and Dundas Shamrocks. He has also a background in rugby union, having represented the Australian Schoolboys while attending St. Patrick's College, Strathfield in 2016. Doueihi is the first cousin once removed of former Australian national rugby union, and later Lebanon, coach Michael Cheika.

== Playing career ==
=== 2017–2019 ===
After playing for the Balmain Tigers in the S. G. Ball Cup for two years, Doueihi signed a two-year contract with the South Sydney Rabbitohs in October 2016.

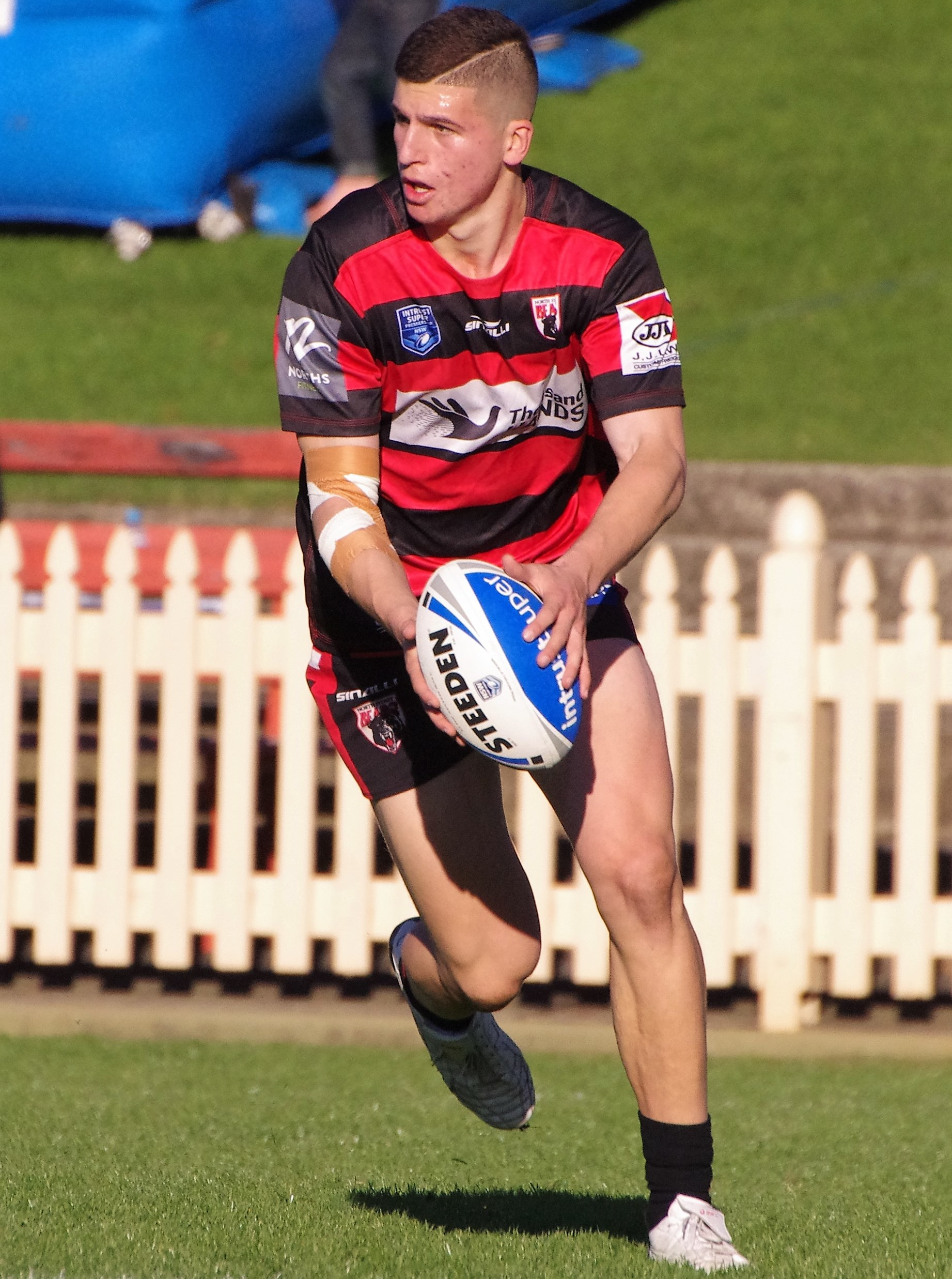
Doueihi playing for the North Sydney Bears in 2017

In 2017, he played 12 games for the Rabbitohs in the NYC, and was called upon to play for the Rabbitohs' feeder club, the North Sydney Bears, throughout the year.

Doueihi made his international debut for Lebanon against Malta on 6 May 2017. In October 2017, he was named in Lebanon's 24-man squad for the 2017 World Cup. He played in their 32–16 win over Niue in a pre-tournament warm up match, landing 2 from 2 conversions.

Doueihi made his debut for South Sydney in round 2 of the 2018 NRL season against Penrith. He made 15 appearances for Souths before suffering a season ending anterior cruciate ligament (ACL) knee injury in their 30–20 victory over Melbourne.

Doueihi made his long awaited return for South Sydney in round 12 of the 2019 NRL season. He later said, "At a younger age it's a pretty cool thing to be versatile. I debuted at Souths in 2018 when Seibs was our coach. He played me pretty much every position in the backline so I got to learn all the different positions like half, five-eighth, fullback and centre – I even landed on the wing one game."

With the signing of Latrell Mitchell for 2020, it left Doueihi on the outer with South Sydney. On 30 January 2020, Doueihi signed a four-year contract to return to his roots at Wests Tigers.

=== 2020 ===
In round 17, he scored two tries and kicked five goals as Wests defeated Manly-Warringah 34–32 at Brookvale Oval.

Douehi played every game for Wests in 2020 as the club finished 11th on the table and missed the finals.

=== 2021 ===
In round 10, Doueihi scored two tries and kicked six goals in Wests Tigers 36–18 victory over Newcastle. In round 16, he scored two tries in a 22–38 defeat against South Sydney.

Despite the Tigers winning just a third of their games, Doueihi scored 174 points in 2021, the fourth most of any player in the competition, and the 7th highest season total ever by a Wests Tigers player.

=== 2022 ===
Doueihi played a total of 11 games for the Wests Tigers in the 2022 NRL season as the club finished bottom of the table and claimed the wooden spoon for the first time in their club history. In the opening match of Lebanon's 2021 World Cup campaign, Doueihi was sent off in the second half for dissent during the 34-12 loss to New Zealand. On 19 October, Doueihi was suspended for one match over the incident and would miss Lebanon's second group match against Ireland.

=== 2023 ===
In round 6 of the 2023 NRL season, Doueihi was taken from the field during the second half of Wests Tigers 28-22 loss against Parramatta with a knee injury. On 18 April, Doueihi was ruled out for 12–16 months after it was confirmed he had suffered a third ACL tear on his left knee. On 3 December, Doueihi was issued with a notice by the Wests Tigers club to explain his actions over a tweet he posted in response to a LGBTQ+ inclusion post. The post from the account read 'How to speak about LGBTQ+ inclusion', Doueihi responded to the post writing "embarrassing post" which he later deleted. Doueihi had previously been involved in a gay rights controversy when he supported a Sydney Catholic girls school banning students bringing female dates to the Year 12 formal.

=== 2024 ===
Doueihi made his long-awaited return to the Wests Tigers team in round 16 of the 2024 NRL season, scoring a try in the clubs 48-24 victory over Canberra. He played seven matches for the club as they finished with the wooden spoon for a third straight season.

=== 2025 ===
In round 8 of the 2025 NRL season, Doueihi kicked a penalty goal in golden point extra-time to win the match over Cronulla 20-18. In round 20, Doueihi kicked the winning field goal for the Wests Tigers with ten seconds remaining as the club defeated the Gold Coast 21-20. Seeking a new contract with Wests Tigers, he was described as "a true Mr Fix-It" who "had no problems filling in at centre", was "a first-class back-up option", and "his big body and ball-playing ability are two key attributes for the modern-day No.13".

In August, Doueihi was moved to halfback and days later, after a victory over Canterbury, Wests announced that he had re-signed with the club on a two year deal. Doueihi said, "I'm a local boy and my priority was to stay. Also, after my third ACL (in 2023), [coach] Benji was one of the first people to get around me in the sheds after that game."

Doueihi's ended season on 25 August, after an attempted tackle on Jason Taumalolo left him with a multiple facial fractures. He scored 135 points for the season, the most for the Tigers and the 11th most in the competition.

=== 2026 ===
On 13 March, the Wests Tigers announced that Doueihi had extended his contract with the club until the end of 2029. Early in the 2026 NRL season, Doueihi was high on the Dally M leaderboard, and was mooted as a possible State of Origin selection. In round 9, he dislocated his shoulder in Wests Tigers 52-10 loss against Cronulla and was ruled out for an indefinite period.

Ahead of the clubs round 21 game against Canberra, it was reported that Doueihi had refused to play for the side after being placed in a different position by head coach Benji Marshall. Wests would go on to lose the game 56-10. The following week, Doueihi was named in the Wests Tigers team to face Parramatta. He scored a try in the match and kicked a field goal as the club lost narrowly 16-13.

Doueihi was Wests Tigers' top point-scorer for the season, and the 23rd highest in the NRL, with 84 points from his 14 games.

== Statistics ==
Year	Team	Games	Tries	Goals	FGs	Pts
2018	South Sydney Rabbitohs	15	2	9		26
2019	South Sydney Rabbitohs	15		1		2
2020	Wests Tigers	20	6	16		56
2021	Wests Tigers	20	9	69		174
2022	Wests Tigers	11	2	22		52
2023	Wests Tigers	6	1	12		28
2024	Wests Tigers	7	3			12
2025	Wests Tigers	21	6	55	1	135
2026	Wests Tigers	10	7	19	1	67
	Totals	125	36	204	2	552
