= 2017 Rugby League World Cup =

15th Rugby League World Cup tournament

- Number of teams: 14
- Host countries: Australia; New Zealand; Papua New Guinea
- Winner: Australia (11th title)
- Matches played: 28
- Attendance: 382,080 (13,646 per match)
- Points scored: 1264 (45.14 per match)
- Tries scored: 230 (8.21 per match)
- Top scorer: (Australia) Cameron Smith (50)
- Top try scorer: (Australia) Valentine Holmes (12)

The 2017 Rugby League World Cup was the fifteenth staging of the Rugby League World Cup tournament and took place in Australia, New Zealand and Papua New Guinea between 27 October and 2 December 2017. The tournament featured the national teams of 14 Rugby League International Federation member countries who qualified through either standing in the previous tournament or a series of qualification play-off matches. In the final, defending champions Australia, playing in their 14th consecutive World Cup final, faced England at Brisbane's Lang Park, the home side keeping the British scoreless with the Kangaroos winning 6 - 0.

== Host selection ==
At the 2010 Rugby League International Federation executive meeting, the New Zealand Rugby League made an early submission to co-host the 2017 tournament with Australia. The Rugby League World Cup was last held in Australia in 2008.

Two formal bids were subsequently received by the RLIF before a November 2012 deadline; the co-host bid from Australia and New Zealand and a bid from South Africa. On 19 February 2014, it was announced that the joint bid from Australia and New Zealand had won hosting rights.

Michael Brown, the CEO of several big name Australian sporting franchises and the 2015 AFC Asian Cup, was originally appointed CEO of the World Cup in 2015, but resigned less than a year later due to 'workload' and 'homesickness'. He was replaced by Andrew Hill.

== Teams ==
=== Qualification ===
It was announced on 3 August 2014 that 7 of the 8 quarter-finalists from the last World Cup would qualify automatically for the 2017 tournament; hosts Australia and New Zealand, plus England, Fiji, France, Samoa and Scotland. The USA, who were also 2013 quarter-finalists, were denied automatic qualification after a long-running internal governance dispute saw their RLIF membership temporarily suspended in 2014; later, once the matter was resolved, they were accepted into the qualification process. Papua New Guinea were initially set to be involved in the qualifying competition but were later granted automatic qualification, due to becoming co-hosts of the tournament. In addition to the eight automatic qualifiers, the remaining six spots will come from four different qualification zones; three from Europe, one from Asia/Pacific, one from Americas and one from Middle East/Africa.

Tonga were the first team to qualify from the qualification stage after winning the Asian-Pacific play-off. Lebanon were the second team to qualify from the qualification stage, after winning the Middle East-African play-off. The USA were the third team to qualify, winning the Americas qualification group.

Team	Captain	Coach	Previous Apps	Previous best result	Qualification method	World Ranking
Australia	Cameron Smith	(Australia) Mal Meninga	14	Champions (10 times)	Co-hosts	1
England	Sean O'Loughlin	(Australia) Wayne Bennett	5	Runners-up (1975, 1995)	Automatic	3
Fiji	Kevin Naiqama	(Australia) Mick Potter	4	Semi-finals (2008, 2013)	Automatic	7
France	Théo Fages	(France) Aurélien Cologni	14	Runners-up (1954, 1968)	Automatic	6
Ireland	Liam Finn	(England) Mark Aston	3	Quarter-finals (2000, 2008)	Europe 2	8
Italy	Mark Minichiello	(Italy) Cameron Ciraldo	1	Group stage (2013)	Europe play-off	12
Lebanon	Robbie Farah	(Australia) Brad Fittler	1	Group stage (2000)	Middle East-Africa play-off	18
New Zealand	Adam Blair	(New Zealand) David Kidwell	14	Champions (2008)	Co-hosts	2
Papua New Guinea	David Mead	(Papua New Guinea) Michael Marum	6	Quarter-finals (2000)	Co-hosts	16
Samoa	Frank Pritchard	(Australia) Matt Parish	4	Quarter-finals (2000, 2013)	Automatic	5
Scotland	Danny Brough	(England) Steve McCormack	3	Quarter-finals (2013)	Automatic	4
Tonga	Sika Manu	(Australia) Kristian Woolf	4	Group stage (1995, 2000, 2008, 2013)	Asia-Pacific play-off	11
United States	Mark Offerdahl	(England) Brian McDermott	1	Quarter-finals (2013)	Americas play-off	10
Wales	Craig Kopczak	(England) John Kear	4	Semi-finals (1995, 2000)	Europe 1	9

=== Draw ===
The draw was undertaken at the launch of the event in Auckland on 19 July 2016 and involved the same four group format as the 2013 tournament. The first two groups are made up of four teams whilst the other two groups feature three teams each. The top three teams in the first two groups and the winners of the two smaller groups will qualify for the quarter-finals. Group play will involve a round robin in the larger groups, and a round robin in the smaller groups with an additional inter-group game for each team so all teams will play three group games.

Group A	Group B	Group C	Group D
Australia; England; France; Lebanon	New Zealand; Samoa; Scotland; Tonga	Ireland; Papua New Guinea; Wales	Fiji; Italy; United States

=== Squads ===
Each team submitted a squad of twenty-four players for the tournament, the same as the 2013 tournament.

== Venues ==
It was announced in October 2014 that negotiations were being held for Papua New Guinea to host matches. The Papua New Guinea Rugby Football League presented to the RLIF in September 2015, requesting to host three matches. In October 2015 it was confirmed that Papua New Guinea would host three matches in the group stage.

Melbourne Rectangular Stadium in Melbourne hosted the opening game between Australia and England included an Aboriginal selection and a New Zealand Māori side. and while Brisbane Stadium in Brisbane hosted the World Cup final.

Australia
Brisbane	Sydney	Melbourne	Townsville	Canberra
Brisbane Stadium	Sydney Football Stadium	Melbourne Rectangular Stadium	Townsville Stadium	Canberra Stadium
Capacity: 52,500	Capacity: 45,500	Capacity: 30,050	Capacity: 26,500	Capacity: 25,011
	Perth	Cairns	Darwin	
	Perth Rectangular Stadium	Barlow Park	Darwin Stadium	
	Capacity: 20,500	Capacity: 18,000	Capacity: 12,000	
Location of the 2017 Rugby League World Cup venues: Australia; 1 Brisbane Stadium, Brisbane; 2 Sydney Football Stadium, Sydney; 3 Melbourne Rectangular Stadium, Melbourne; 4 Townsville Stadium, Townsville; 5 Canberra Stadium, Canberra; 6 Perth Rectangular Stadium, Perth; 7 Barlow Park, Cairns; 8 Darwin Stadium, Darwin; New Zealand; 9 Wellington Regional Stadium, Wellington; 10 Mount Smart Stadium, Auckland; 11 Waikato Stadium, Hamilton; 12 Christchurch Stadium, Christchurch; Papua New Guinea; 13 National Stadium, Port Moresby
New Zealand				Papua New Guinea
Wellington	Auckland	Hamilton	Christchurch	Port Moresby
Wellington Regional Stadium	Mount Smart Stadium	Waikato Stadium	Christchurch Stadium	National Stadium
Capacity: 34,500	Capacity: 30,000	Capacity: 25,800	Capacity: 18,000	Capacity: 25,000

== Officiating ==
The match officials will be headed by Tony Archer and three coaches: Steve Ganson, Russell Smith and Luke Watts.

- Australia: Grant Atkins, Chris Butler, Matt Cecchin, Steve Chiddy, Ben Cummins, Adam Gee, Ashley Klein, Jared Maxwell, David Munro, Ziggy Przeklasa-Adamski, Belinda Sleeman, Jon Stone, Bernard Sutton, Chris Sutton, Gerard Sutton, Michael Wise
- England: Phil Bentham, James Child, Mark Craven, Robert Hicks, Chris Kendall, Scott Mikalauskas, Liam Moore, Tim Roby, Ben Thaler
- New Zealand: Chris McMillan, Henry Perenara

== Warm-up matches ==
8 October 2017

Malta	24–24	Italy
	Report

Marconi Stadium, Sydney

13 October 2017

Country U23s	26–40	Samoa

McDonalds Park, Wagga Wagga

13 October 2017

France	34–12	Jamaica
	Report

Stade Gilbert Brutus, Perpignan

14 October 2017

Fiji	0–10	Papua New Guinea

ANZ National Stadium, Suva

14 October 2017

Australia	20–4	Papua New Guinea

ANZ National Stadium, Suva

14 October 2017

Fiji	0–18	Australia

ANZ National Stadium, Suva

14 October 2017

Lebanon	32–16	Niue
	Report

Leichhardt Oval, Sydney

20 October 2017

Country U23s	50–14	Scotland

Kingsford Smith Park, Ballina

20 October 2017

Italy	6–16	Tonga

Callendar Park, Innisfail

20 October 2017

Combined Affiliated States	12–74	England

Perth Oval, Perth

== Group stage ==
The first two groups are made up of four teams whilst the other two groups feature three teams each. The top three teams in the Group A and B, and the winners of Group C and D will qualify for the quarter-finals. Group play will involve a round robin in the larger groups, and a round robin in the smaller groups with an additional inter-group game for each team so all teams will play three group games.

=== Group A ===
Pos	Team	Pld	W	D	L	PF	PA	PD	Pts	Qualification
1	Australia (H)	3	3	0	0	104	10	+94	6	Advance to knockout stage
2	England	3	2	0	1	69	34	+35	4	Advance to knockout stage
3	Lebanon	3	1	0	2	39	81	−42	2	Advance to knockout stage
4	France	3	0	0	3	30	117	−87	0	

(H) Hosts

27 October 2017
20:00 AEDT (UTC+11)

Australia	18–4	England
Tries: Gillett (23') 1 Slater (29') 1 Dugan (79') 1 Goals: Smith 3/4 (25', 76' pen, 80')	Report	Tries: 1 (5') McGillvary; Goals: 0/1 Widdop

Melbourne Rectangular Stadium, Melbourne
Attendance: 22,724
Referee: Matt Cecchin (Australia)
Player of the Match: Billy Slater (Australia)

29 October 2017
16:00 AEDT (UTC+11)

France	18–29	Lebanon
Tries: Ader (16', 52') 2 Cardace (68') 1 Goals: Barthau 3/4 (20' pen, 53', 69')	Report	Tries: 2 (40', 80') Robinson; 1 (8') Layoun; 1 (63') Doueihi; 1 (76') Moses; Goals: 4/5 Moses (9', 40', 64', 77'); Field Goals: 1 (74') Moses

Canberra Stadium, Canberra
Attendance: 5,492
Referee: Gerard Sutton (Australia)
Player of the Match: Mitchell Moses (Lebanon)

3 November 2017
20:00 AEDT (UTC+11)

Australia	52–6	France
Tries: Graham (12', 15', 31', 66') 4 Munster (43', 74') 2 Dugan (33') 1 Frizell (49') 1 Slater (52') 1 Holmes (78') 1 Goals: Smith 6/8 (16', 32', 44', 51', 53', 67'); Munster 0/2	Report	Tries: 1 (24') Kheirallah; Goals: 1/1 Marginet (25')

Canberra Stadium, Canberra
Attendance: 12,293
Referee: Robert Hicks (England)
Player of the Match: Wade Graham (Australia)

4 November 2017
20:00 AEDT (UTC+11)

England	29–10	Lebanon
Tries: Watkins (9') 1 McGillvary (25') 1 Hall (28') 1 Currie (32') 1 T. Burgess (56') 1 Goals: Widdop 4/5 (11', 26', 33', 57'); Field Goals: Widdop (80') 1	Report	Tries: 1 (18') Kassis; 1 (76') Wehbe; Goals: 1/2 Moses (19')

Sydney Football Stadium, Sydney
Attendance: 10,237
Referee: Ben Thaler (England)
Player of the Match: Josh Hodgson (England)

11 November 2017
20:00 AEDT (UTC+11)

Australia	34–0	Lebanon
Tries: Munster (9', 50') 2 Maloney (25') 1 Cordner (55') 1 Gagai (76') 1 T. Trbojevic (79') 1 Goals: Maloney 4/4 (52', 56', 78', 80'); Smith 1/2 (26')	Report

Sydney Football Stadium, Sydney
Attendance: 21,127
Referee: James Child (England)
Player of the Match: Reagan Campbell-Gillard (Australia)

12 November 2017
18:00 AWST (UTC+8)

England	36–6	France
Tries: McGillvary (42', 64') 2 Widdop (3') 1 Ratchford (6') 1 Graham (9') 1 Percival (23') 1 Bateman (29') 1 Goals: Widdop 4/7 (4', 7', 10', 43')	Report	Tries: 1 (34') Garcia; Goals: 1/1 Albert (35')

Perth Rectangular Stadium, Perth
Attendance: 14,744
Referee: Phil Bentham (England)
Player of the Match: Gareth Widdop (England)

=== Group B ===
Pos	Team	Pld	W	D	L	PF	PA	PD	Pts	Qualification
1	Tonga	3	3	0	0	110	44	+66	6	Advance to knockout stage
2	New Zealand (H)	3	2	0	1	134	42	+92	4	Advance to knockout stage
3	Samoa	3	0	1	2	40	84	−44	1	Advance to knockout stage
4	Scotland	3	0	1	2	24	138	−114	1	

(H) Hosts

28 October 2017
20:10 NZDT (UTC+13)

New Zealand	38–8	Samoa
Tries: Jordan Rapana (4') 1 Shaun Johnson (20') 1 Brad Takairangi (46') 1 Kodi Nikorima (52') 1 Issac Liu (55') 1 Roger Tuivasa-Sheck (68') 1 Nelson Asofa-Solomona (72') 1 Goals: Shaun Johnson 5/7 (21', 53', 56', 69', 73')	Report	Tries: 1 (37') Ken Maumalo; 1 (80') Joseph Paulo; Goals: 0/1 Peter Matautia; 0/1 Tim Lafai

Mt Smart Stadium, Auckland
Attendance: 17,857
Referee: James Child (England)
Player of the Match: Joseph Tapine (New Zealand)

29 October 2017
16:15 AEDT (UTC+10)

Scotland	4–50	Tonga
Tries: Danny Addy (62') 1 Goals: Danny Brough 0/1	Report	Tries: 3 (3', 20', 40') Michael Jennings; 2 (26', 73') Daniel Tupou; 1 (17') Jason Taumalolo; 1 (23') Sika Manu; 1 (38') Peni Terepo; 1 (76') Ata Hingano; Goals: 6/7 Sio Siua Taukeiaho (4', 19', 21', 24', 75', 78'); 1/2 Ata Hingano (40')

Barlow Park, Cairns
Attendance: 9,216
Referee: Phil Bentham (England)
Player of the Match: Jason Taumalolo (Tonga)

4 November 2017
17:00 NZDT (UTC+13)

New Zealand	74–6	Scotland
Tries: Te Maire Martin (32', 52', 76') 3 Pita Hiku (39', 58', 69') 3 Jason Nightingale (13', 23') 2 Kenny Bromwich (9') 1 Joseph Tapine (16') 1 Russell Packer (43') 1 Dean Whare (55') 1 Shaun Johnson (61') 1 Elijah Taylor (79') 1 Goals: Shaun Johnson 9/14 (11', 33', 44', 53', 56', 60', 63', 70', 80')	Report	Tries: 1 (72') Oscar Thomas; Goals: 1/1 Danny Addy (73')

Christchurch Stadium, Christchurch
Attendance: 12,130
Referee: Henry Perenara (New Zealand)
Player of the Match: Roger Tuivasa-Sheck (New Zealand)

4 November 2017
19:30 NZDT (UTC+13)

Samoa	18–32	Tonga
Tries: Jazz Tevaga (17') 1 Ben Roberts (65') 1 Tim Lafai (73') 1 Goals: Tim Lafai 3/3 (18', 66', 74')	Report	Tries: 2 (10', 29') Michael Jennings; 1 (52') Peni Terepo; 1 (60') Ben Murdoch-Masila; 1 (77') Manu Ma'u; Goals: 4/4 Sio Siua Taukeiaho (11', 28' pen, 30', 79'); 2/2 Ata Hingano (53', 61')

Waikato Stadium, Hamilton
Attendance: 18,156
Referee: Ben Cummins (Australia)
Player of the Match: Andrew Fifita (Tonga)

11 November 2017
17:00 NZDT (UTC+13)

New Zealand	22–28	Tonga
Tries: Roger Tuivasa-Sheck (39', 72') 2 Dallin Watene-Zelezniak (21') 1 Jordan Rapana (28') 1 Goals: Shaun Johnson 3/4 (30', 40', 73')	Report	Tries: 3 (48', 59', 77') David Fusitu'a; 1 (62') Tuimoala Lolohea; 1 (65') William Hopoate; Goals: 3/4 Sio Siua Taukeiaho (7' pen, 63', 66'); 1/2 Tuimoala Lolohea (60')

Waikato Stadium, Hamilton
Attendance: 24,041
Referee: Gerard Sutton (Australia)
Player of the Match: Tuimoala Lolohea (Tonga)

11 November 2017
17:00 AEDT (UTC+10)

Samoa	14–14	Scotland
Tries: Junior Paulo (12') 1 Matthew Wright (49') 1 Young Tonumaipea (66') 1 Goals: Matthew Wright 1/3 (13')	Report	Tries: 1 (5') Lewis Tierney; 1 (28') Frankie Mariano; Goals: 3/4 Danny Addy (6', 18' pen, 30')

Barlow Park, Cairns
Attendance: 4,309
Referee: Ashley Klein (Australia)
Player of the Match: Danny Addy (Scotland)

=== Group C ===
Pos	Team	Pld	W	D	L	PF	PA	PD	Pts	Qualification
1	Papua New Guinea (H)	3	3	0	0	128	12	+116	6	Advance to knockout stage
2	Ireland	3	2	0	1	76	32	+44	4	
3	Wales	3	0	0	3	18	156	−138	0	

(H) Hosts

28 October 2017
15:00 AEDT (UTC+10)

Papua New Guinea	50–6	Wales
Tries: David Mead (5', 10', 60') 3 Rhyse Martin (43', 53') 2 Nene Macdonald (23') 1 Kato Ottio (34') 1 Wellington Albert (38') 1 Justin Olam (56') 1 Paul Aiton (71') 1 Goals: Rhyse Martin 5/8 (24', 36', 39', 44', 72'); Ase Boas 0/2	Report	Tries: 1 (80') Regan Grace; Goals: 1/1 Courtney Davies (80')

National Football Stadium, Port Moresby
Attendance: 14,800
Referee: Ben Cummins (Australia)
Player of the Match: David Mead (Papua New Guinea)

5 November 2017
16:00 AEDT (UTC+10)

Papua New Guinea	14–6	Ireland
Tries: Garry Lo (16') 1 Nene Macdonald (26') 1 Watson Boas (78') 1 Goals: Ase Boas 1/1 (79'); Rhyse Martin 0/2	Report	Tries: 1 (5') Michael McIlorum; Goals: 1/1 Liam Finn (6')

National Football Stadium, Port Moresby
Attendance: 14,800
Referee: Matt Cecchin (Australia)
Player of the Match: Garry Lo (Papua New Guinea)

12 November 2017
15:30 AWST (UTC+8)

Wales	6–34	Ireland
Tries: Ben Morris (57') 1 Goals: Courtney Davies 1/1 (59')	Report	Tries: 2 (34', 66') Oliver Roberts; 1 (8') Api Pewhairangi; 1 (34') Joe Philbin; 1 (39') Liam Finn; 1 (74') Liam Kay; Goals: 5/6 Liam Finn (9', 32', 35', 67', 76')

Perth Rectangular Stadium, Perth
Attendance: 14,744
Referee: Ben Thaler (England)
Player of the Match: Oliver Roberts (Ireland)

=== Group D ===
Pos	Team	Pld	W	D	L	PF	PA	PD	Pts	Qualification
1	Fiji	3	3	0	0	168	28	+140	6	Advance to knockout stage
2	Italy	3	1	0	2	68	74	−6	2	
3	United States	3	0	0	3	12	168	−156	0	

28 October
7:40pm (AEST)

Fiji	58–12	United States
Tries: Taane Milne (3', 11') 2 Kevin Naiqama (7', 30') 2 Suliasi Vunivalu (35', 64') 2 Akuila Uate (14') 1 Kane Evans (17') 1 Jarryd Hayne (46') 1 Viliame Kikau (60') 1 Henry Raiwalui (66') 1 Goals: Apisai Koroisau 5/8 (8', 13', 18', 31', 47'); Taane Milne 2/3 (61', 68')	Report	Tries: 1 (21') Matt Shipway; 1 (72') Junior Vaivai; Goals: 2/2 Bureta Fariamo (22', 74')

Townsville Stadium, Townsville
Attendance: 5,103
Referee: Henry Perenara (New Zealand)
Player of the Match: Kevin Naiqama (Fiji)

5 November
4:00pm (AEST)

Italy	46–0	United States
Tries: Joey Tramontana (8', 37') 2 James Tedesco (14', 43') 2 Josh Mantellato (18') 1 Ryan Ghietti (25') 1 Paul Vaughan (59') 1 Mason Cerruto (73') 1 Goals: Josh Mantellato 7/8 (9', 16', 26', 38', 45', 60', 74')	Report

Townsville Stadium, Townsville
Attendance: 7,732
Referee: Ashley Klein (Australia)
Player of the Match: Joey Tramontana (Italy)

10 November
7:40pm (AEDT)

Fiji	38–10	Italy
Tries: Suliasi Vunivalu (60', 63', 68') 3 Kevin Naiqama (28') 1 Henry Raiwalui (40') 1 Brayden Wiliame (54') 1 Marcelo Montoya (75') 1 Goals: Apisai Koroisau 3/4 (29', 40', 61'); Taane Milne 2/3 (64', 69'); Sin Bins: Jarryd Hayne (34')	Report	Tries: 1 (20') Josh Mantellato; 1 (43') Nathan Milone; Goals: 1/2 Josh Mantellato (44'); Sin Bins: (12') Jayden Walker (34') Joey Tramontana

Canberra Stadium, Canberra
Attendance: 6,733
Referee: Robert Hicks (England)
Player of the Match: Apisai Koroisau (Fiji)

=== Inter-group matches ===
29 October 2017
14:00 AEDT (UTC+10)

Ireland	36–12	Italy
Tries: Liam Kay (3', 30') 2 George King (10') 1 Kyle Amor (55') 1 Michael Morgan (60') 1 Louie McCarthy-Scarsbrook (79') 1 Goals: Liam Finn 6/7 (4', 11', 18' pen, 31', 56', 61')	Report	Tries: 1 (38') Justin Castellaro; 1 (47') Nathan Milone; Goals: 2/2 Josh Mantellato (39', 48')

Barlow Park, Cairns
Attendance: 9,216
Referee: Grant Atkins (Australia)
Player of the Match: Liam Finn (Ireland)

5 November 2017
18:30 AEDT (UTC+10)

Fiji	72–6	Wales
Tries: Suliasi Vunivalu (14', 51', 61') 3 Viliame Kikau (22', 40') 2 Taane Milne (31', 56') 2 Eloni Vunakece (6') 1 Henry Raiwalui (16') 1 Salesi Fainga'a (27') 1 Marcelo Montoya (33') 1 Jarryd Hayne (42') 1 Joe Lovodua (65') 1 Ben Nakubuwai (70') 1 Goals: Apisai Koroisau 4/7 (7', 17', 23', 28'); Taane Milne 3/5 (40', 43', 52'); Suliasi Vunivalu 1/2 (66')	Report	Tries: 1 (11') Morgan Knowles; Goals: 1/1 Courtney Davies (12')

Townsville Stadium, Townsville
Attendance: 7,732
Referee: Chris Kendall (England)
Player of the Match: Akuila Uate (Fiji)

12 November 2017
15:00 AEDT (UTC+10)

Papua New Guinea	64–0	United States
Tries: Justin Olam (12', 66', 75') 3 Lachlan Lam (8', 16') 2 James Segeyaro (14') 1 Rod Griffin (25') 1 Stargroth Amean (39') 1 David Mead (42') 1 Watson Boas (60') 1 Nene Macdonald (63') 1 Goals: Rhyse Martin 10/11 (10', 15', 18', 26', 40', 44', 62', 65', 68', 77')	Report

National Football Stadium, Port Moresby
Attendance: 14,800
Referee: Adam Gee (Australia)
Player of the Match: Lachlan Lam (Papua New Guinea)

== Knockout stage ==
Three teams from each of Groups A and B and one team from each of Groups C and D advanced to the quarter-finals. All quarter-finalists automatically qualified for the 2021 Rugby League World Cup. The quarter-final fixture were finalised at the conclusion of the pool stages, to ensure that Australia played in Darwin on 17 November and New Zealand in Wellington on 18 November.

Quarter-finals
17 November – Darwin
Australia	46
Samoa	0
18 November – Wellington
New Zealand	2
Fiji	4
18 November – Christchurch
Tonga	24
Lebanon	22
19 November – Melbourne
England	36
Papua New Guinea	6

Semi-finals
24 November – Brisbane
Australia	54
Fiji	6
25 November – Auckland
Tonga	18
England	20

Final
2 December – Brisbane
Australia	6
England	0

=== Quarter-finals ===
==== Australia vs Samoa ====
17 November 2017
19:00 ACST (UTC+9:30)

Australia	46–0	Samoa
Tries: Holmes (9', 17', 51', 57', 74') 5 Morgan (31', 36') 2 Slater (24') 1 Goal: Smith 7/8 (10', 19', 26', 33', 38', 53', 58')

Darwin Stadium, Darwin
Attendance: 13,473
Referee: Phil Bentham (England)
Player of the Match: Valentine Holmes (Australia)

==== Tonga vs Lebanon ====
18 November 2017
17:00 NZDT (UTC+13)

Tonga	24–22	Lebanon
Tries: Fusitu'a (19', 33') 2 Lolohea (4') 1 Hopoate (23') 1 Goal: Hingano 4/5 (5', 24', 34', 53' pen)		Tries: 2 (40', 69') Miski; 1 (9') Doueihi; 1 (30') Elias; Goals: 3/4 Moses (10', 31', 70')

Christchurch Stadium, Christchurch
Attendance: 8,309
Referee: Gerard Sutton (Australia)
Player of the Match: Mitchell Moses (Lebanon)

==== New Zealand vs Fiji ====
18 November 2017
19:30 NZDT (UTC+13)

New Zealand	2–4	Fiji
Goals: Johnson 1/1 (45' pen)		Goals: 1/1 Koroisau (15' pen); 1/1 Milne (62' pen)

Wellington Regional Stadium, Wellington
Attendance: 12,713
Referee: Matt Cecchin (Australia)
Player of the Match: Kevin Naiqama (Fiji)

==== England vs Papua New Guinea ====
19 November 2017
16:00 AEDT (UTC+11)

England	36–6	Papua New Guinea
Tries: McGillvary (13', 20') 2 Watkins (68', 72') 2 Walmsley (33') 1 Currie (56') 1 Hall (79') 1 Goals: Widdop 4/7 (34', 57', 69', 80')		Tries: 1 (60') Lo; Goals: 1/1 Martin (61')

Melbourne Rectangular Stadium, Melbourne
Attendance: 10,563
Referee: James Child (England)
Player of the Match: Jermaine McGillvary (England)

=== Semi-finals ===
==== Australia vs Fiji ====
24 November 2017
19:00 AEST (UTC+10)

Australia	54–6	Fiji
Tries: Holmes (18', 24', 42', 51', 65', 75') 6 Gagai (31', 69') 2 Slater (14', 48') 2 Goals: Smith 7/10 (15', 19', 33', 43', 49', 53', 67')		Tries: 1 (59') Vunivalu; Goals: 1/2 Koroisau (7' pen)

Brisbane Stadium, Brisbane
Attendance: 22,073
Referee: Gerard Sutton (Australia)
Player of the Match: Cameron Smith (Australia)

==== Tonga vs England ====
25 November 2017
18:00 NZDT (UTC+13)

Tonga	18–20	England
Tries: Pangai Junior (73') 1 Havili (76') 1 Lolohea (77') 1 Goals: Taukeiaho 3/3 (73', 76, 77')		Tries: 1 (11') McGillvary; 1 (16') Widdop; 1 (68') Bateman; Goals: 4/4 Widdop (12, 17, 50 pen, 69)

Mt Smart Stadium, Auckland
Attendance: 30,003
Referee: Matt Cecchin (Australia)
Player of the Match: Gareth Widdop (England)

=== Final: Australia vs England ===
2 December 2017
19:00 AEST (UTC+10)

Australia	6–0	England
Tries: Cordner (15'); Goals: Smith 1/1 (16')

Brisbane Stadium, Brisbane
Attendance: 40,033
Referee: Gerard Sutton (Australia)
Player of the Match: Boyd Cordner (Australia)

== Statistics ==
=== Top try scorers ===
12 tries

- (Australia) Valentine Holmes

9 tries

- (Fiji) Suliasi Vunivalu

7 tries

- (England) Jermaine McGillvary

5 tries

- (Australia) Billy Slater
- (Tonga) David Fusitu'a
- (Tonga) Michael Jennings

4 tries

- (Australia) Dane Gagai
- (Australia) Wade Graham
- (Australia) Cameron Munster
- (Fiji) Taane Milne
- (Papua New Guinea) David Mead
- (Papua New Guinea) Justin Olam

3 tries

- (England) Kallum Watkins
- (Fiji) Viliame Kikau
- (Fiji) Kevin Naiqama
- (Fiji) Henry Raiwalui
- (Ireland) Liam Kay
- (Papua New Guinea) Nene Macdonald
- (New Zealand) Peta Hiku
- (New Zealand) Te Maire Martin
- (New Zealand) Roger Tuivasa-Sheck
- (Tonga) Tuimoala Lolohea

2 tries

- (Australia) Boyd Cordner
- (Australia) Josh Dugan
- (Australia) Michael Morgan
- (England) John Bateman
- (England) Gareth Widdop
- (Fiji) Jarryd Hayne
- (Fiji) Marcelo Montoya
- (France) Bastien Ader
- (Ireland) Oliver Roberts
- (Italy) James Tedesco
- (Italy) Joseph Tramontana
- (Lebanon) Adam Doueihi
- (Lebanon) Abbas Miski
- (Lebanon) Travis Robinson
- (New Zealand) Shaun Johnson
- (New Zealand) Jason Nightingale
- (New Zealand) Jordan Rapana
- (Papua New Guinea) Watson Boas
- (Papua New Guinea) Lachlan Lam
- (Papua New Guinea) Garry Lo
- (Papua New Guinea) Rhyse Martin
- (Tonga) Will Hopoate
- (Tonga) Peni Terepo
- (Tonga) Daniel Tupou

1 try

- (Australia) Tyson Frizell
- (Australia) Tom Trbojevic
- (Australia) Matt Gillett
- (England) Tom Burgess
- (England) Ben Currie
- (England) James Graham
- (England) Ryan Hall
- (England) Mark Percival
- (England) Stefan Ratchford
- (England) Alex Walmsley
- (Fiji) Kane Evans
- (Fiji) Salesi Junior Fainga'a
- (Fiji) Joe Lovodua
- (Fiji) Ben Nakubuwai
- (Fiji) Brayden Wiliame
- (Fiji) Akuila Uate
- (Fiji) Eloni Vunakece
- (France) Damien Cardace
- (France) Benjamin Garcia
- (France) Mark Kheirallah
- (Ireland) Kyle Amor
- (Ireland) Liam Finn
- (Ireland) George King
- (Ireland) Louie McCarthy-Scarsbrook
- (Ireland) Michael McIlorum
- (Ireland) Michael Morgan
- (Ireland) Api Pewhairangi
- (Ireland) Joe Philbin
- (Italy) Justin Castellaro
- (Italy) Mason Cerruto
- (Italy) Ryan Ghietti
- (Italy) Josh Mantellato
- (Italy) Nathan Milone
- (Italy) Paul Vaughan
- (Lebanon) Anthony Layoun
- (Lebanon) James Elias
- (Lebanon) Nick Kassis
- (Lebanon) Mitchell Moses
- (Lebanon) Jason Wehbe
- (New Zealand) Nelson Asofa-Solomona
- (New Zealand) Kenny Bromwich
- (New Zealand) Issac Liu
- (New Zealand) Kodi Nikorima
- (New Zealand) Russell Packer
- (New Zealand) Brad Takairangi
- (New Zealand) Joseph Tapine
- (New Zealand) Elijah Taylor
- (New Zealand) Dallin Watene-Zelezniak
- (New Zealand) Dean Whare
- (Papua New Guinea) Paul Aiton
- (Papua New Guinea) Wellington Albert
- (Papua New Guinea) James Segeyaro
- (Papua New Guinea) Rod Griffin
- (Papua New Guinea) Stargroth Amean
- (Papua New Guinea) Kato Ottio
- (Samoa) Tim Lafai
- (Samoa) Ken Maumalo
- (Samoa) Joseph Paulo
- (Samoa) Junior Paulo
- (Samoa) Ben Roberts
- (Samoa) Jazz Tevaga
- (Samoa) Young Tonumaipea
- (Samoa) Matthew Wright
- (Scotland) Danny Addy
- (Scotland) Frankie Mariano
- (Scotland) Oscar Thomas
- (Scotland) Lewis Tierney
- (Tonga) Ata Hingano
- (Tonga) Manu Ma'u
- (Tonga) Sika Manu
- (Tonga) Ben Murdoch-Masila
- (Tonga) Jason Taumalolo
- (Tonga) Tevita Pangai Junior
- (Tonga) Siliva Havili
- (United States) Matt Shipway
- (United States) Junior Vaivai
- (Wales) Regan Grace
- (Wales) Morgan Knowles
- (Wales) Ben Morris

=== Top point scorers ===
Player	Team	App.	Total	Details		
Player	Team	App.	Total	T	G	FG
Cameron Smith	Australia	6	50	0	25	0
Valentine Holmes	Australia	6	48	12	0	0
Shaun Johnson	New Zealand	4	44	2	18	0
Gareth Widdop	England	6	41	2	16	1
Rhyse Martin	Papua New Guinea	4	40	2	16	0
Suliasi Vunivalu	Fiji	5	38	9	1	0
Taane Milne	Fiji	5	32	4	8	0
Sio Siua Taukeiaho	Tonga	4	32	0	16	0
Liam Finn	Ireland	3	28	1	12	0
Apisai Koroisau	Fiji	5	28	0	14	0
Jermaine McGillvary	England	6	28	7	0	0
Josh Mantellato	Italy	3	28	2	10	0

=== Final standings ===
Pos	Grp	Team	Pld	W	D	L	PF	PA	PD	Pts	Final result
1	A	Australia (H)	6	6	0	0	210	16	+194	12	Champions
2	A	England	6	4	0	2	125	64	+61	8	Runners-up
3	D	Fiji	5	4	0	1	178	84	+94	8	Eliminated in semi-finals
4	B	Tonga	5	4	0	1	152	86	+66	8	Eliminated in semi-finals
5	C	Papua New Guinea (H)	4	3	0	1	134	48	+86	6	Eliminated in quarter-finals
6	B	New Zealand (H)	4	2	0	2	136	46	+90	4	Eliminated in quarter-finals
7	A	Lebanon	4	1	0	3	61	105	−44	2	Eliminated in quarter-finals
8	B	Samoa	4	0	1	3	40	130	−90	1	Eliminated in quarter-finals
9	C	Ireland	3	2	0	1	76	32	+44	4	Eliminated in group stage
10	D	Italy	3	1	0	2	68	74	−6	2	Eliminated in group stage
11	B	Scotland	3	0	1	2	24	138	−114	1	Eliminated in group stage
12	A	France	3	0	0	3	30	117	−87	0	Eliminated in group stage
13	C	Wales	3	0	0	3	18	156	−138	0	Eliminated in group stage
14	D	United States	3	0	0	3	12	168	−156	0	Eliminated in group stage

Updated to match(es) played on 30 July 2021. Source: World Cup 2017
(H) Hosts

== Criticism and controversy ==
The lack of games in New South Wales, the heartland of rugby league in Australia, drew some criticism. Only one of the 13 confirmed tournament venues was in New South Wales (Sydney Football Stadium) and it is only hosting two group-stage fixtures, both featuring Lebanon. This was due to the refusal of the New South Wales Government to bid for hosting rights. Despite the so-called 'Sydney Cup snub', the RLWC organisers backed their decision and the venues they were using.

In the buildup to the Samoa vs. Tonga game in Hamilton, controversy occurred after fans from both countries were caught having brawls in South Auckland. At least 6 people were arrested from the brawls resulting in a massive security increase for the game. Both teams, celebrities, and police urged fans to calm down. Following the results of the controversial incident, a Tongan Advisory Council member lashed out at organisers, saying that this tournament is poorly organised compared to the 2011 Rugby Union World Cup, mentioning that Rugby Union World Cup organisers engaged with community groups 18 months beforehand, whereas this tournament was "scrambled around".

After Scotland's 68-point thrashing to New Zealand in Christchurch, captain Danny Brough, Sam Brooks, and Jonathan Walker were sent home for violating code of conduct after being all deemed too 'intoxicated' for their team's flight to Cairns for Scotland's next game against Samoa. Italian players James Tedesco and Shannon Wakeman were under investigation by the World Cup integrity unit for a brawl at a Cairns nightclub.

There was criticism on how Samoa and Lebanon qualified for the Quarter-Finals of the World Cup, while Ireland missed out. Samoa played in Pool B where three sides qualify for the finals and only one misses out. Samoa lost to both New Zealand and Tonga, and drew with Scotland. Lebanon was in Pool A which had the same format as Pool B. Lebanon lost to both Australia and England and beat France. Ireland played in Pool C where there are only three teams and the winner is the only team that goes to the finals. Ireland beat both Italy and Wales and only just lost to Papua New Guinea and didn't qualify for the finals. Irish captain Liam Finn, said "I don't know if it's unfair, it probably makes sense, but to me: try and explain that to someone who's not rugby league", "That's how we judge it. I tell someone 'we didn't go through, we won two games; someone got through by drawing one," and "That's where we should be focused: how do we attract new fans when that's how you're explaining the game to them?" in the press conference after his team's victory over Wales.

== Broadcasting ==
Seven Network was the Australian and worldwide host broadcaster, winning the rights for the event in July 2016, beating the likes of Foxtel and Optus.

Country or region	Broadcaster	Broadcasting	Ref.
Australia	Seven Network	All 28 matches live (via Channel 7, 7mate, or streamed from the 7Live app)	
Austria; Germany; Switzerland	ProSieben Maxx ran.de	6 matches live (ProSieben Maxx); All 28 matches live streamed (ran.de)	
Germany	Sportdeutschland.TV	All 28 matches live streamed	
Fiji	Fiji One	All 28 matches live	
France	beIN Sports	All 28 matches live	
Hong Kong	PCCW	All 28 matches live	
Ireland	eir Sports	All 28 matches live	
Japan	DAZN	All 28 matches live	
Malaysia	Astro	All 28 matches live	
Middle East	OSN Sports	All 28 matches live	
New Zealand	Sky Sport	All 28 matches live	
Papua New Guinea	EM TV	All 28 matches live	
United Kingdom	BBC Sport	All England matches live; Ireland, Wales and Scotland matches delayed; highlights from all 28 matches	
United Kingdom	Premier Sports	27 matches Live (Delayed coverage of NZ vs Tonga due to football match)	
United States	Fox Sports	All USA matches and knockout matches live	
