= Dundas Shamrocks Junior Rugby League Football Club =

Australian rugby league football club based in Sydney

Dundas Shamrocks

Club information
- Full name: Dundas Shamrocks Junior Rugby League Football Club
- Nickname: shammies
- Colours: Green; Yellow
- Founded: 1964

Current details
- Ground: St Patrick's Marist College Dundas
- President: Colin Field
- Competition: Balmain Rugby League

The Dundas Shamrocks Junior Rugby League Football Club was formed in 1964 as an attachment to St Patrick's Marist College Dundas' sports auxiliary for weekend rugby league within the Balmain Junior Rugby League competition. In the mid-1990s the school sports auxiliary ceased to exist and the club was rechristened the Dundas Shamrocks. The club has been a member of the Balmain Junior Rugby League since its inception in the 1960s and provides teams for age groups from under 6's to A-Grade.

The club headquarters are located at the St Patrick's Marist College Dundas, on the corner of Kissing Point Road and Kirby Street, Dundas. The ground boasts many fields (international and mod) within the Balmain Junior Rugby League and has excellent canteen and change room facilities.

The Shamrocks club primarily draws players from the following suburbs:

Ermington, Rydalmere, Dundas, Oatlands, North Parramatta, Silverwater, Eastwood, Carlingford, North Rocks, West Ryde and Merrylands. However, players are welcome from all areas.

== Notable Juniors ==
- Mark O'Neill (1994-07 West Tigers, Balmain, Leeds & Hull KR)
- James Webster (1999-04 Balmain Tigers, Parramatta Eels & Hull KR)
- Feleti Mateo (2004-16 Parramatta Eels, London Broncos, New Zealand Warriors & Manly-Warringah Sea Eagles)
- Curtis Sironen (2012- West Tigers & Manly Sea Eagles)
- Nathan Brown (2013- Wests Tigers, South Sydney Rabbitohs & Parramatta Eels)
- Nathan Milone (2015-16 West Tigers)
- David Fifita (2014- Cronulla Sharks)
- Andrew Webster (2017- Wests Tigers Coach & New Zealand Warriors Coach
- Adam Doueihi (2018- South Sydney Rabbitohs)
- Ryan Papenhuyzen (2019- Melbourne Storm)
- Alex Seyfarth (2020- Wests Tigers)
- Haze Dunster (2020- Parramatta Eels)
