= Kane Evans =

Australian rugby league player (born 1992)

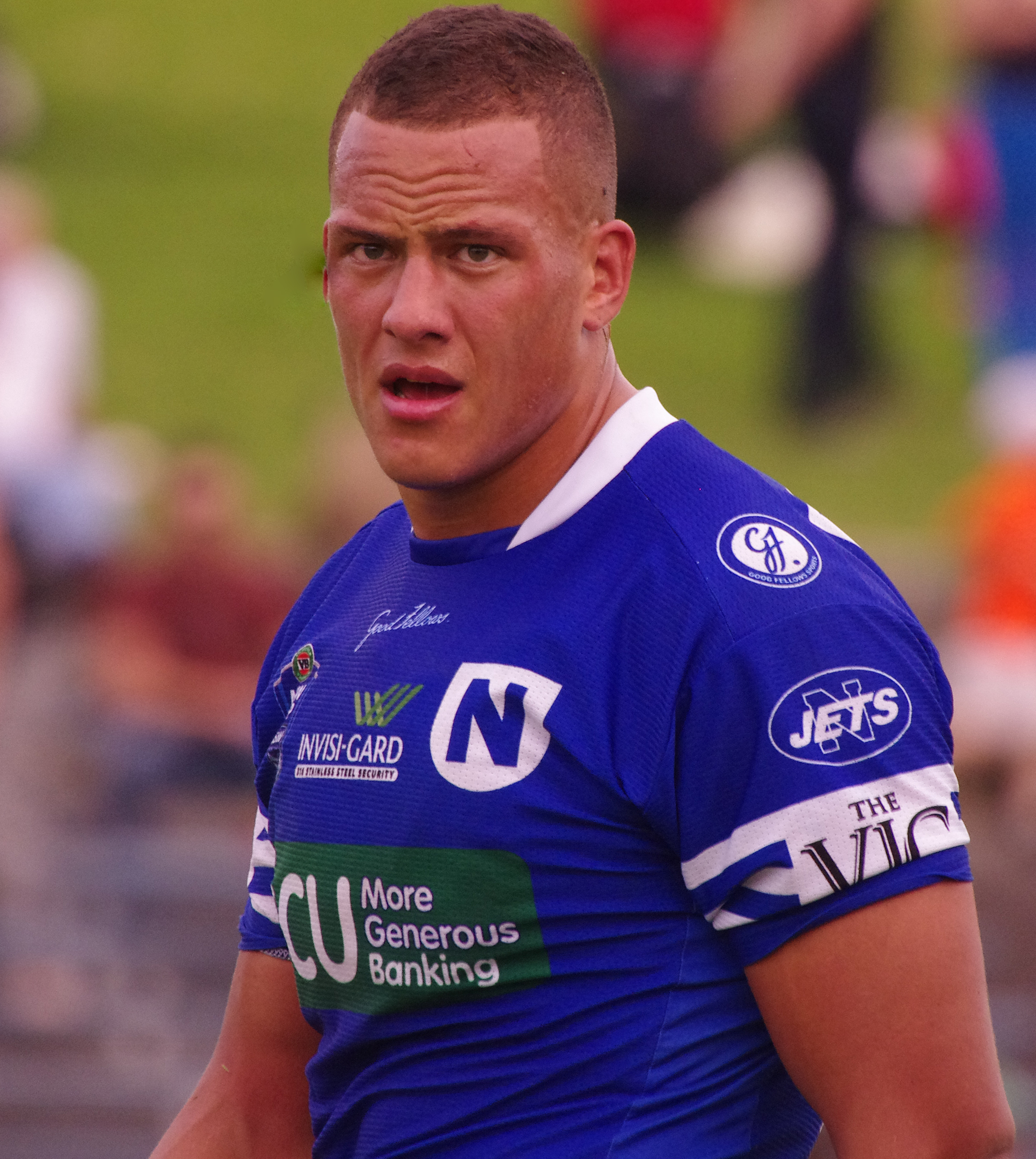

Personal information
- Full name: Kane Bradley Evans
- Born: 9 January 1992 (age 34) Camperdown, New South Wales, Australia
- Height: 200 cm (6 ft 7 in)
- Weight: 116 kg (18 st 4 lb; 256 lb)

Playing information
- Position: Prop
Club
Years	Team	Pld	T	G	FG	P
2014–17	Sydney Roosters	74	3	0	0	12
2018–20	Parramatta Eels	43	5	0	0	20
2021	New Zealand Warriors	14	0	0	0	0
2022–23	Hull F.C.	23	1	0	0	4
	Total	154	9	0	0	36
Representative
Years	Team	Pld	T	G	FG	P
2013–19	Fiji	13	1	0	0	4
2015	NSW City	1	0	0	0	0
2016	World All Stars	1	0	0	0	0
- Source: As of 17 May 2023

Kane Evans (born 9 January 1992) is an Australian rugby league footballer who currently plays as a prop for Glebe Dirty Reds. He previously played for the Sydney Roosters, Parramatta Eels and the New Zealand Warriors in the National Rugby League (NRL), and Hull F.C. in the Super League.

At representative level, Evans played for Fiji, New South Wales City and the World All Stars.

== Background ==
Evans was born in Camperdown, a suburb of Sydney, New South Wales, to an Australian father and a Fijian mother. His father, Peter Davies, played for South Sydney, Balmain and Canterbury in the 1980s.

Evans played his junior football for the Leichhardt Wanderers, Balmain Police Boys and Leichhardt Juniors before being signed by the Sydney Roosters.

In 2011 and 2012, Evans played for the Roosters' NYC team. At the end of 2011, Evans was named at prop in the 2011 NYC team of the year. In 2012, Evans played for the New South Wales under-20 team and the Junior Kangaroos. In 2013, Evans moved on to the Roosters' New South Wales Cup team, the Newtown Jets. At the end of 2013, Evans was named on the interchange bench in the 2013 New South Wales Cup team of the year and played for Fiji at the World Cup. Evans played 5 matches.

== Playing career ==
=== 2014 ===
In round 2 of the 2014 NRL season, Evans made his NRL debut for the Sydney Roosters, coming off the interchange bench against the Parramatta Eels in the Roosters 56–4 win at the SFS. On 9 April 2014, Evans extended his contract for a further 3 years, keeping him at the Roosters until the end of the 2017 season. In May 2014 Evans was selected to play for Fiji in the 2014 Pacific Test against Samoa. Evans played at prop in Fiji's 16–32 loss at Penrith Stadium. Evans finished the 2014 NRL season having played in 9 matches for the Roosters.

=== 2015 ===
On 31 January and 1 February, Evans played for the Roosters in the 2015 NRL Auckland Nines. On 3 May, he played for New South Wales City against New South Wales Country in the 2015 City vs Country Origin, playing off in the interchange bench in City's 22–34 loss in Wagga Wagga. In round 15, against the St. George Illawarra Dragons, he scored his first NRL career try in the Roosters' 19–14 win at the Sydney Football Stadium. In round 21, against the Canterbury-Bankstown Bulldogs, he made headlines by producing shoulder charge on Bulldogs forward Sam Kasiano in the Roosters' 38–28 win at the Sydney Football Stadium. Evans finished off the 2015 season having played in 26 matches and scoring 3 tries for the Roosters. On 15 December, he was named on interchange bench for the World All Stars team to play the Indigenous All Stars on 16 February 2016.

=== 2016 ===
On 13 January, Evans was named in the emerging New South Wales Blues squad. On 13 February, he played for the World All Stars against the Indigenous All Stars in the 2016 All Stars match, playing off the interchange bench in his team's 12–8 win at Suncorp Stadium. On 7 May, he played for Fiji against Papua New Guinea in the 2016 Melanesian Cup, where he started at prop in the 24–22 loss at Parramatta Stadium. Evans finished the 2016 NRL season with him playing in 23 matches for the Roosters. On 8 October 2016, Evans played for Fiji against Samoa, starting at prop in the 20–18 win in Apia, Samoa.

=== 2017 ===
In February 2017, Evans was selected in the Roosters tournament winning 2017 NRL Auckland Nines squad. On 4 May 2017, Evans signed a 3-year contract with the Parramatta Eels, starting from 2018. On 6 May 2017, Evans played for Fiji against Tonga in the 2017 Pacific Cup Test, starting at prop in the 26–24 loss at Campbelltown Stadium. Evans finished his last year with the Sydney Roosters with him playing in 16 matches in the 2017 NRL season. On 7 October 2017, Evans was named in the 24-man squad for Fiji for the 2017 Rugby League World Cup. In Fiji's first pool match against USA, Evans broke his wrist while scoring his try in the 58–12 rampaging win at 1300SMILES Stadium, ruling him out for the rest of the tournament with him only playing in 1 match.

=== 2018 ===
In Round 1 of the 2018 NRL season, Evans made his club debut for the Parramatta Eels against the Penrith Panthers, playing off the interchange bench in the 24–14 loss at Penrith Stadium. After losing their opening six games of the season, Evans was dropped to reserve grade by coach Brad Arthur along with a number of other players. Evans spoke to the media about being dropped saying “I've been going crap, I don't think I've been up to standard coming off injury from the World Cup and a few little injuries in pre-season. I definitely need to work on my fitness and I'll be doing that in the next couple of weeks, It's the truth, my game doesn't hide anything, You can think what you want, but I haven't been performing, You can see that in my stats and how I've been going.”

On 2 June 2018, Evans was accused of making a racial slur in a match involving Wentworthville and The New Zealand Warriors reserve grade side. With 4 minutes remaining, Evans allegedly said a racist slur at New Zealand player Joseph Vuna. Vuna made a complaint to the on-field referee Todd Smith, who placed Evans on report. On 7 June 2018, The NSWRL withdrew their racial slur charges against Evans.

On 4 August 2018, Evans was recalled to the Parramatta side for the first time in over 2 months to take on the Gold Coast. Parramatta went on to win the match 28–12. Evans finished 2018 with 8 appearances for the club as Parramatta finished in last position on the table and claimed its 14th wooden spoon.

=== 2019 ===
Despite his poor form in 2018, Evans managed to remain in the Parramatta starting 17 for the beginning of the 2019 season. Evans played in the first 5 games of the year from the bench but was demoted to reserve grade by coach Brad Arthur after the club suffered a 19–0 defeat against the Canberra Raiders.

In round 12, Evans made his first start of the season for the run on side as Parramatta defeated a depleted South Sydney side 26–14 at Western Sydney Stadium.

In round 25, Evans played his 100th NRL game in Parramatta's 32–16 win over the Manly-Warringah Sea Eagles at BankWest Stadium.

=== 2020 ===
Evans scored his first try of the 2020 NRL season in round 2 as Parramatta defeated the Gold Coast 46–6.

On 12 August, Evans signed a two-year deal to join the New Zealand Warriors starting in 2021.

=== 2021 ===
In round 5 of the 2021 NRL season, he made his debut for New Zealand against Manly-Warringah.

On 19 July, it was announced that Evans was under investigation by the NRL after cameras at the ground spotted an obscene message on Evans wrist tape which read “Fold some c**t”. Evans did not feature in New Zealand's round 18 match against Penrith as he was 18th man.

New Zealand CEO Cameron George spoke to the media saying “We don't accept that, we don't condone it, or think it's appropriate and I'm waiting to see if there is anything that comes from it from the NRL. I'm assuming that's going to be today and I told Kane this morning to be ready for something. So we'll wait and see what happens, but from a club perspective we'll work with the NRL and see where we land with everything". On 21 July, Evans was fined $5000 by the NRL over the incident.

In round 21, Evans was sent to the sin bin twice during New Zealand's 18-16 victory over Cronulla. In one incident, Evans was sent to the bin after punching Cronulla player Will Chambers twice in the face.

In round 25, Evans was sent to the sin bin for fighting in the club's 44-0 loss against the Gold Coast. The following week, Evans was suspended for five matches in relation to the incident. On 8 October, Evans was released by the New Zealand Warriors even though the player still had one year left on his contract.

On 27 October, Evans signed a two-year deal to join English side Hull F.C.

=== 2022 ===
In round 4 of the 2022 Super League season, Evans made his club debut for Hull F.C. against Castleford. The following week, he was sent to the sin bin during the club's victory over Leeds. Evans played a total of 17 games for Hull F.C. in the 2022 season as the club finished 9th.

=== 2023 ===
Evans played 6 games to start the season. On 16 May, Evans was granted an immediate release from his Hull F.C. contract.

=== 2024 ===
On 19 March 2024, it was reported that Kane had signed with Australian side Glebe Dirty Reds playing in the Ron Massey Cup.

== Personal life ==
Following his NRL career, Evans experienced addiction and homelessness. On 8 June 2026, Evans sat down with James Bracey and he publicly came out as gay, becoming just the second male player in Australian professional rugby league history to do so.
