= Michael Morgan (rugby league, born 1995) =

Ireland international rugby league footballer

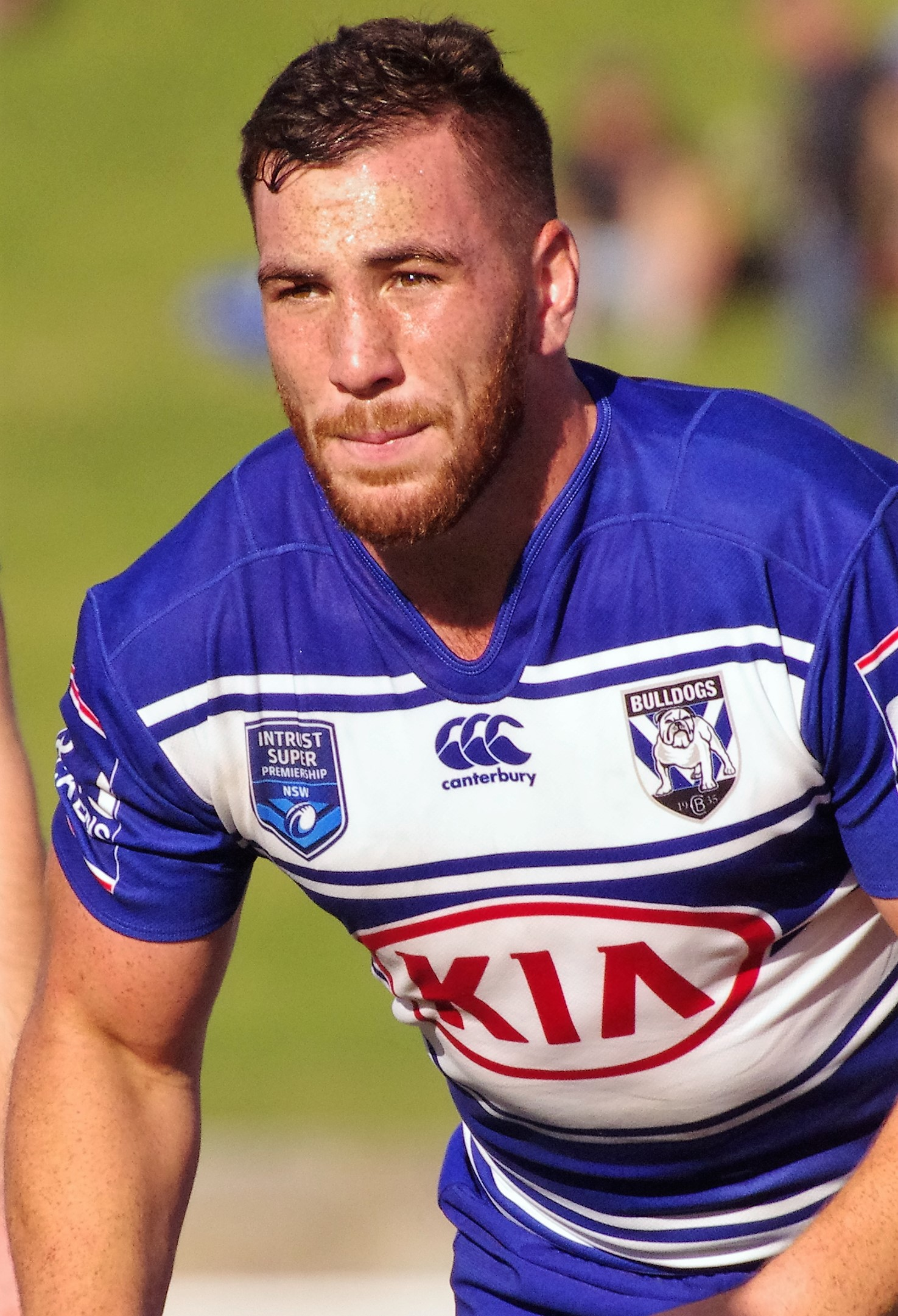

Personal information
- Full name: Michael Koheleti Morgan
- Born: 21 January 1995 (age 31) Sydney, New South Wales, Australia
- Height: 183 cm (6 ft 0 in)
- Weight: 98 kg (15 st 6 lb)

Playing information
- Position: Centre
Representative
Years	Team	Pld	T	G	FG	P
2017	Ireland	2	1	0	0	4
- Source: As of 29 October 2017

Michael Koheleti Morgan (born 21 January 1995) is an Ireland international rugby league footballer who plays for the Canterbury-Bankstown Bulldogs in the Intrust Super Premiership. Primarily a centre, he represented Ireland at the 2017 Rugby League World Cup.

== Background ==
Morgan was born in Sydney, New South Wales, Australia. He is of Irish and Tongan descent. He played his junior rugby league for the Bankstown Bulls and attended Marist College Kogarah before being signed by the Canterbury-Bankstown Bulldogs.

== Playing career ==
=== Early career ===
In 2011, Morgan played for the Bulldogs' Harold Matthews Cup side and was selected to play for the New South Wales under-16 side. In 2012 and 2013, he played for the Bulldogs' SG Ball Cup side and played for New South Wales under-18 in 2013, scoring a try in their 56–6 win over Queensland. From 2013 to 2015, Morgan played for the Bulldogs' NYC side, scoring 16 tries in 46 games. In 2016, he played for the Guildford Owls in the Sydney Shield.

=== 2017 ===
In 2017, Morgan re-joined the Bulldogs, playing for their Intrust Super Premiership side. In October, he was called up to the Ireland squad for the 2017 Rugby League World Cup after Toby King was ruled out through injury.
