= David Marando =

Former United States international rugby league footballer

Personal information
- Born: 2 May 1984 (age 42) Sydney, New South Wales, Australia
- Height: 180 cm (5 ft 11 in)
- Weight: 82 kg (12 st 13 lb)

Playing information
- Position: Halfback
Club
Years	Team	Pld	T	G	FG	P
	Belrose Eagles
Representative
Years	Team	Pld	T	G	FG	P
2007–17	United States	4	1	1	0	6
- Source: As of 29 January 2021

David Marando is an Australian rugby league footballer who represented the United States in the 2013 Rugby League World Cup.

== Playing career ==
He currently plays for the Belrose Eagles. In 2013 & 2017, Marando was named in the United States squad for both the 2013 & 2017 World Cup.
