= Sam Tochterman-Talbott =

United States international rugby league footballer

Personal information
- Born: 5 June 1995 (age 31)
- Weight: 105 kg (16 st 7 lb; 231 lb)

Playing information
- Position: Second-row
Club
Years	Team	Pld	T	G	FG	P
	Tweed Heads Seagulls
Representative
Years	Team	Pld	T	G	FG	P
2015–17	United States	4	0	0	0	0

Sam Tochterman-Talbott (born 5 June 1995), also known as Sam Carson, is a United States international rugby league footballer who plays as a second-row forward for the Tweed Heads Seagulls in the Queensland Cup. He was selected to represent the United States in the 2017 Rugby League World Cup.
