= Henry Raiwalui =

Fiji international rugby league footballer

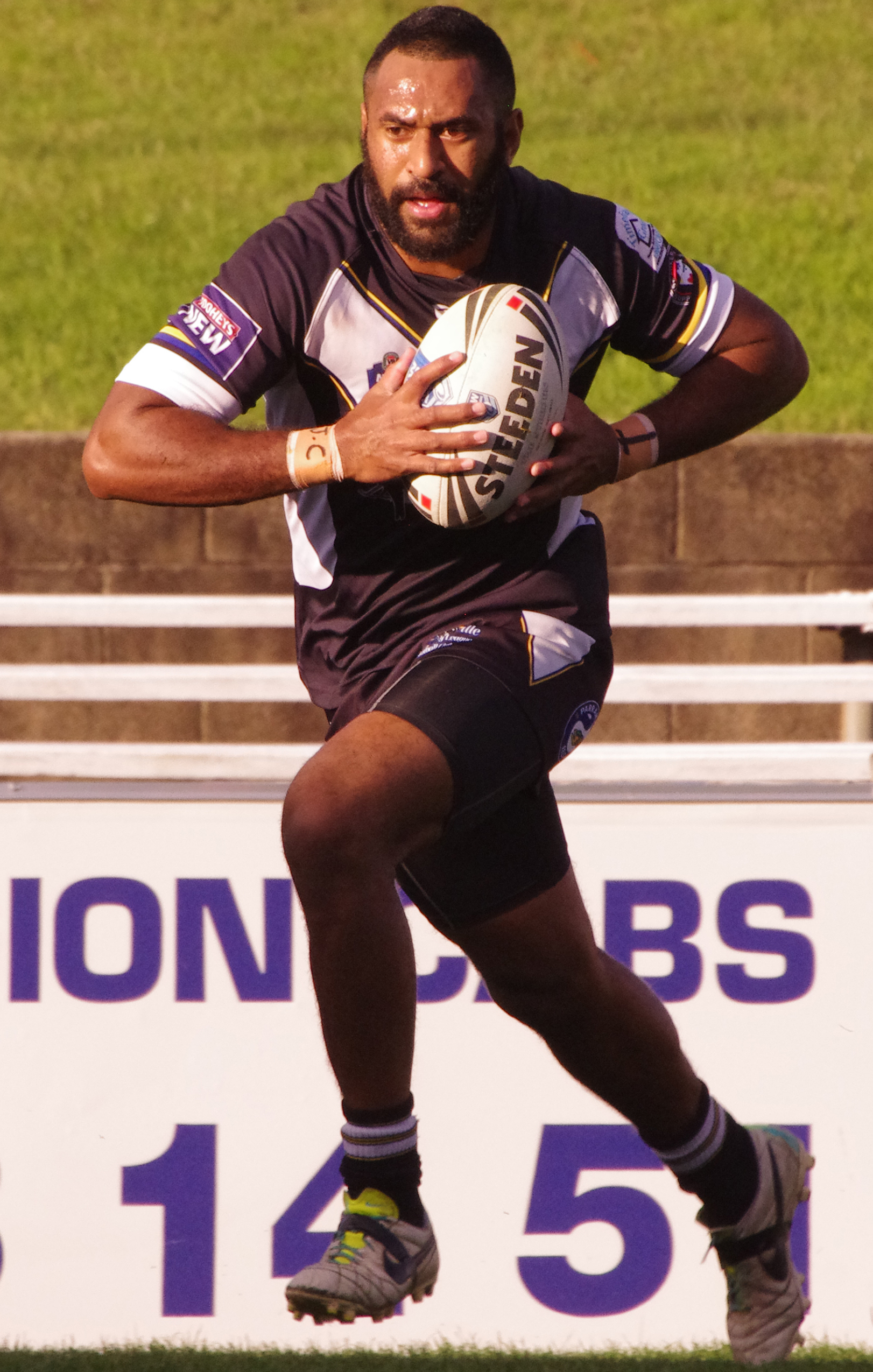

Personal information
- Full name: Henry Kataula Raiwalui
- Born: 24 February 1989 (age 37) Sydney, New South Wales, Australia
- Height: 6 ft 1 in (1.86 m)
- Weight: 15 st 10 lb (100 kg)

Playing information
- Position: Scrum-half, Stand-off
Club
Years	Team	Pld	T	G	FG	P
2023	London Broncos	23	5	0	0	20
Representative
Years	Team	Pld	T	G	FG	P
2016–23	Fiji	12	4	4	0	24
- Source: As of 15 November 2026

Henry Raiwalui (born 24 February 1989) is a Fiji international rugby league footballer who last played as scrum-half or stand-off, most recently for the London Broncos in the Betfred Championship.

He has previously played for the Wentworthville Magpies in the Ron Massey Cup.

== Early life ==
Born in Sydney, Australia, Raiwalui is of Fijian descent. He grew up in Suva, Fiji from the age of two until year 4 of his schooling. He played his junior rugby league for the Earlwood Saints.

== Playing career ==
In 2008 and 2009, Raiwalui played for the St. George Illawarra Dragons in the NYC, In 2012, he represented a Fijian XIII against an Italian XIII, scoring a try. before moving onto the Illawarra Cutters.

In 2016, Raiwalui made his Test debut for Fiji against Samoa.

In 2016 he also played for the Blacktown Workers in the Ron Massey Cup. He played for Wentworthville when they competed in the Ron Massey Cup.

In 2017, he joined the Mount Pritchard Mounties in the Intrust Super Premiership. Raiwalui was selected to play for Fiji in the 2017 Rugby League World Cup.

Raiwalui played for Wentworthville in their 2019 Ron Massey Cup grand final victory over St Mary's at Leichhardt Oval. On 15 October 2023, Raiwalui played in the London Broncos upset Million Pound Game victory over Toulouse Olympique.
