= Josh Rice (rugby league) =

United States international rugby league player

Joshua Rice
Personal information
- Born: July 8, 1987 (age 39) Honolulu, Hawaii, United States

Playing information
- Position: Centre, Second-row
Club
Years	Team	Pld	T	G	FG	P
	Ipswich Jets
	New York Knights
	Total	0	0	0	0	0
Representative
Years	Team	Pld	T	G	FG	P
2011–17	United States	10	0	0	0	0
- Source: As of January 29, 2021

Joshua Rice (born July 8, 1987) is an American rugby league and former college football player. Redshirted in 2005, Rice played as a linebacker for the Hawaii Warriors football team between 2006 and 2009. He switched to rugby league and earned selection for the United States national team between 2011 and 2017. He most notably appeared at the 2017 Rugby League World Cup.

In rugby league, Rice plays as a second-row or centre for the New York Knights in the USA Rugby League and previously the Ipswich Jets in the Queensland Cup.

== Early life ==
Rice was born in Honolulu, Hawaii, and attended Coronado High School in Nevada. His maternal grandfather is David W. Chappell.
