= Salesi Junior Fainga'a =

Fiji international rugby league footballer

Salesi Fainga'a
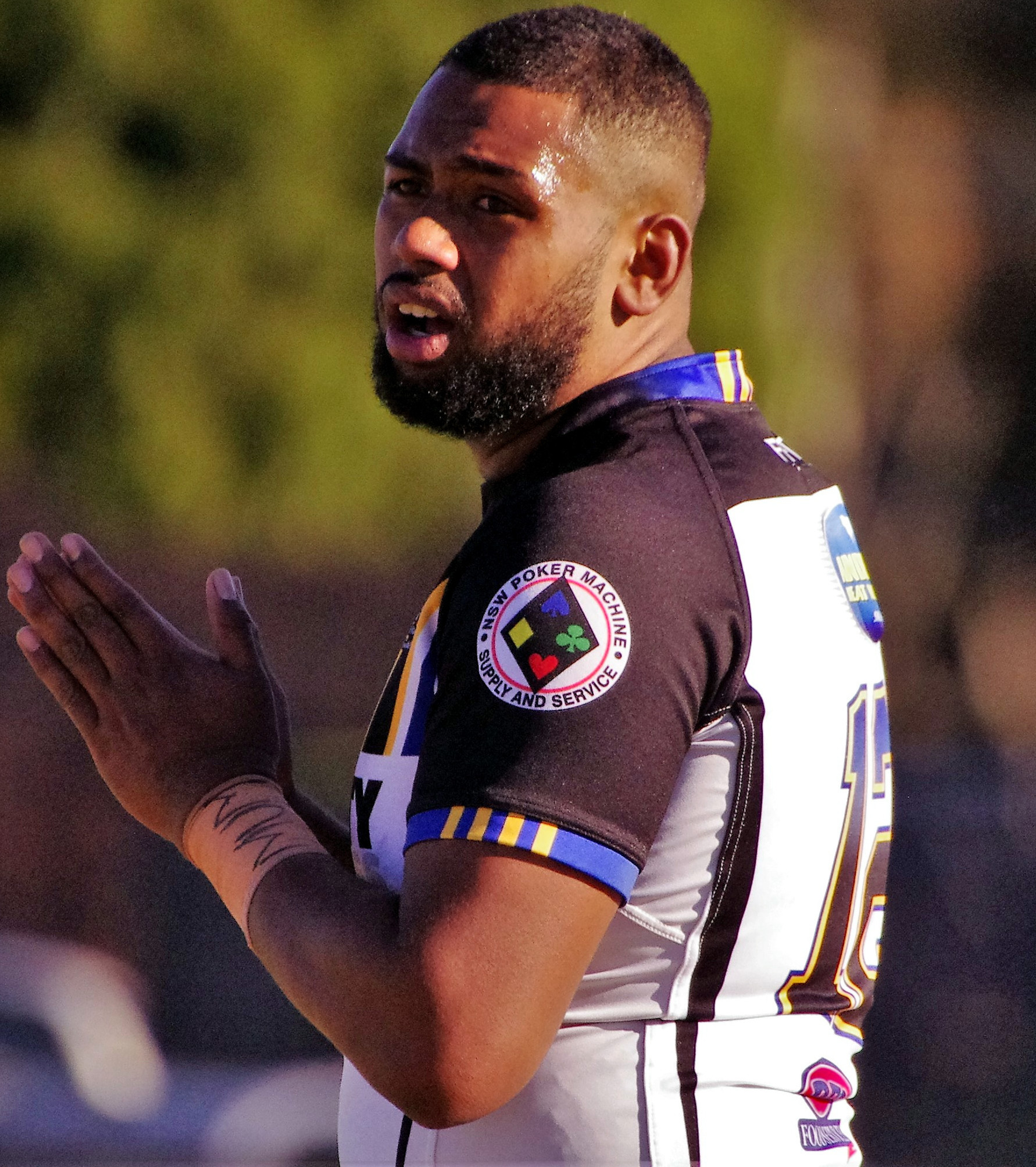

Personal information
- Full name: Salesi Junior Fainga'a
- Born: 19 August 1998 (age 27) Sydney, New South Wales, Australia
- Height: 189 cm (6 ft 2 in)
- Weight: 110 kg (17 st 5 lb)

Playing information
- Position: Second-row
Representative
Years	Team	Pld	T	G	FG	P
2017–19	Fiji	2	1	0	0	4
- Source: As of 19 May 2019

Salesi Fainga'a (born 19 August 1998) is a Fiji international rugby league footballer who last played as a second-row forward for the Western Suburbs Magpies in the NSW Cup.

== Background ==
Fainga'a was born in Sydney, New South Wales, Australia.

== Playing career ==
Fainga'a played for the Parramatta Eels in their under 20'team for the 2017 and 2018 season. He appeared in Parramatta's u20's grand final loss to the Manly Sea Eagles. Fainga'a represented Fiji in the 2017 Rugby League World Cup, appearing in one game, later appearing again for Fiji against Papua New Guinea in 2018.
