= Ben Nakubuwai =

Fiji international rugby league footballer

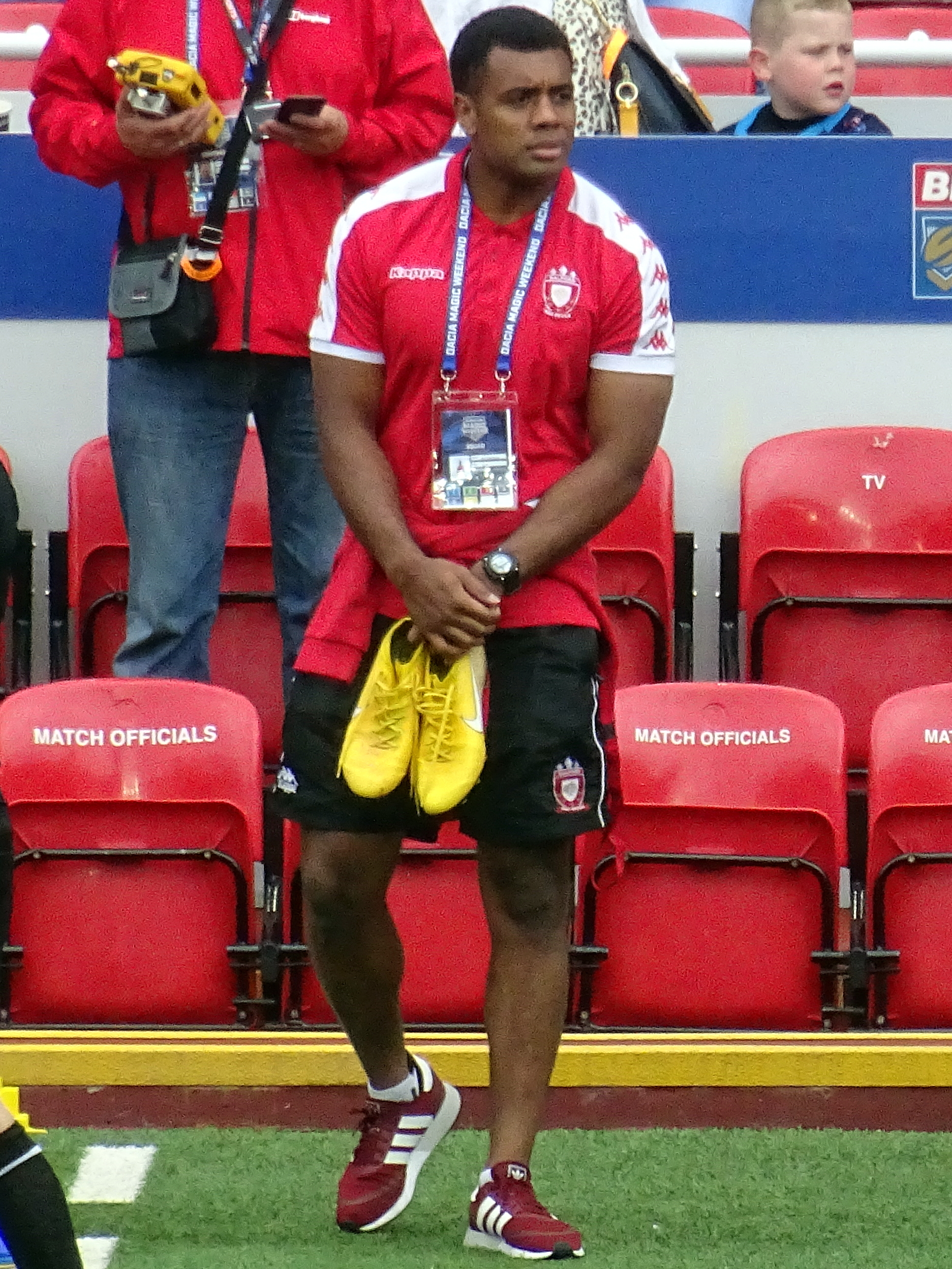

Personal information
- Full name: Petero Benjamin Nakubuwai
- Born: 15 March 1996 (age 30) Suva, Fiji
- Height: 194 cm (6 ft 4 in)
- Weight: 108 kg (17 st 0 lb)

Playing information
- Position: Prop, Second-row
Club
Years	Team	Pld	T	G	FG	P
2017	Gold Coast Titans	2	1	0	0	4
2018–19	Salford Red Devils	41	3	0	0	12
2022–25	Leigh Leopards	44	4	0	0	8
2024 (loan)	→ Featherstone Rovers	18	0	0	0	0
	Total	105	8	0	0	24
Representative
Years	Team	Pld	T	G	FG	P
2016–	Fiji	16	5	0	0	16
- Source: As of 14 October 2026
- Father: Pio Nakubuwai

Petero Benjamin "Ben" Nakubuwai (born 15 March 1996) is a Fiji international rugby league footballer who plays as a prop for the Norths Devils in the Queensland Cup.

Nakubuwai previously played for the Gold Coast Titans in the National Rugby League and the Salford Red Devils in the Super League, and was a member of Fiji's squad for the 2017 World Cup.

== Background ==
Nakubuwai was born in Suva , Fiji to Fijian parents Pio and Eseta. His father was a dual-code rugby international for Fiji during the 1990s, and is known as one of the pioneers of rugby league in Fiji.

Nakubuwai grew up playing rugby union from the age of eight for the Leeton Phantoms, and later took up rugby league at a junior level at age fourteen, playing for the Yanco-Wamoon Hawks and Bidgee Hurricanes. Having been spotted by the Melbourne Storm, Nakubwai moved to Melbourne after completing his Higher School Certificate to play in their S. G. Ball Cup team.

== Playing career ==
=== Early career ===
Nakubuwai joined Melbourne's National Youth Competition team in 2015, playing 42 matches over two seasons. He made his international debut for Fiji against Papua New Guinea in May 2016. In December 2016, Nakubuwai signed with the Gold Coast Titans.

=== 2017 ===
Nakubuwai spent most of the 2017 season playing for one of the Titans' feeder clubs, the Tweed Heads Seagulls, in the Queensland Cup. He was called upon to play two NRL matches for the Titans at the end of the season.

On 29 November 2017, it was revealed Nakubuwai had signed a two-year deal to join English side Salford Red Devils in the Super League.

=== 2022 ===
On 26 April 2022 it was announced that Nakubuwai had signed for Leigh until the end of the season. On 28 May, he played for Leigh in their 1895 Cup final victory over Featherstone, and on 2 October appeared off the bench in the Championship grand final victory against Batley Bulldogs.

=== 2023 ===
On 12 August 2023, Nakubuwai played in the 2023 Challenge Cup final victory over Hull Kingston Rovers. It was Leigh's first major trophy in 52 years. He played 19 games for Leigh in the 2023 Super League season as the club finished fifth on the table and qualified for the playoffs. He played in their elimination playoff loss against Hull Kingston Rovers.

=== 2024 ===
On 1 Jun 2024 Nakubuwai signed for Featherstone Rovers in the Championship on a season-long loan, helping Rovers to sixth-place and playoff qualification.

=== 2025 ===
On 14 March 2025 it was reported that Ben had departed Leigh Leopards.

On 2 April 2025 it was reported that he had re-joined the Queensland Cup team Norths Devils, linking up again with Rohan Smith
