= Joe Lovodua =

Fiji international rugby league footballer

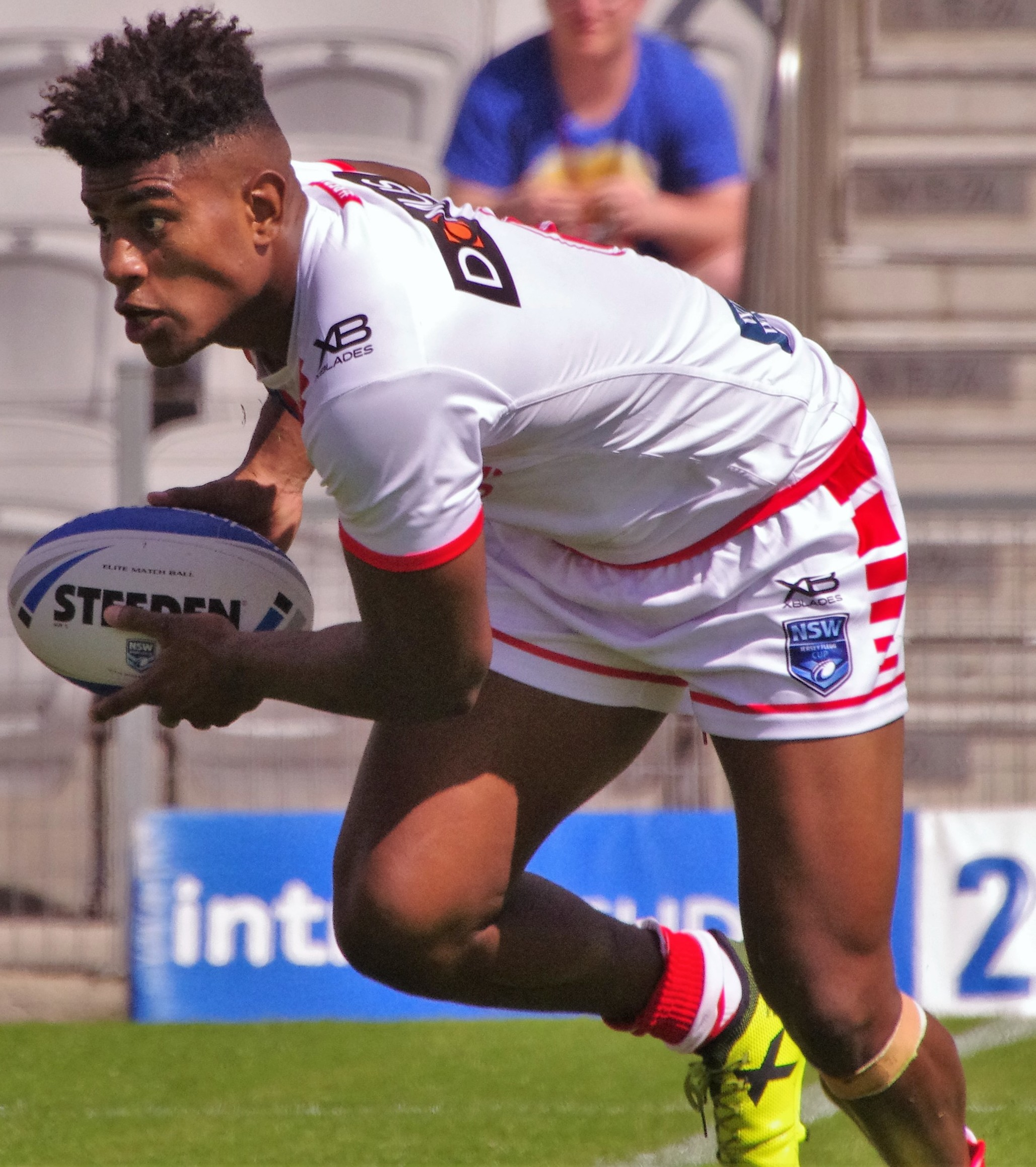

Personal information
- Full name: Josaia Naulumatua Lovodua
- Born: 18 March 1998 (age 28) Lautoka, Fiji
- Height: 181 cm (5 ft 11 in)
- Weight: 94 kg (14 st 11 lb)

Playing information
- Position: Stand-off, Hooker, Loose forward
Club
Years	Team	Pld	T	G	FG	P
2021–23	Hull FC	45	6	0	0	24
2024–	Doncaster RLFC	24	8	0	0	32
	Total	69	14	0	0	56
Representative
Years	Team	Pld	T	G	FG	P
2017–19	Fiji	9	3	0	0	12
2022	Combined Nations All Stars	1	0	0	0	0
- Source: As of 20 November 2026

Josaia Naulumatua "Joe" Lovodua (born 18 March 1998) is a Fijian professional rugby league footballer who plays for Doncaster RLFC in the RFL Championship. He primarily plays as a utility. He has represented the Fijian national team, most notably at the 2017 Rugby League World Cup.

== Early life ==
Lovodua was born in Lautoka, Fiji.

He played junior rugby league for Hurstville United.

== Playing career ==
=== St. George Illawarra Dragons ===
Lovodua began playing for the St. George Illawarra Dragons in the 2017 Holden Cup. In 2018 and 2019 he played in the Canterbury Cup NSW for the Dragons.

=== South Sydney Rabbitohs ===
In 2021, he joined South Sydney's NSW Cup team. Lovodua joined Hull F.C. on a one-year contract for 2022.

=== Hull FC ===
He played 25 games with Hull F.C. in the 2022 Super League season as the club finished 9th. Lovodua played 19 matches for Hull F.C. for in the Super League XXVIII season as the club finished 10th on the table.

=== Doncaster RLFC ===
On 20 November 2023, it was reported that he had signed for Doncaster RLFC in the RFL Championship on a two-year deal.

=== International ===
He was selected to represent Fiji in the 2017 Rugby League World Cup.
