= Nathan Milone =

Italy international rugby league footballer

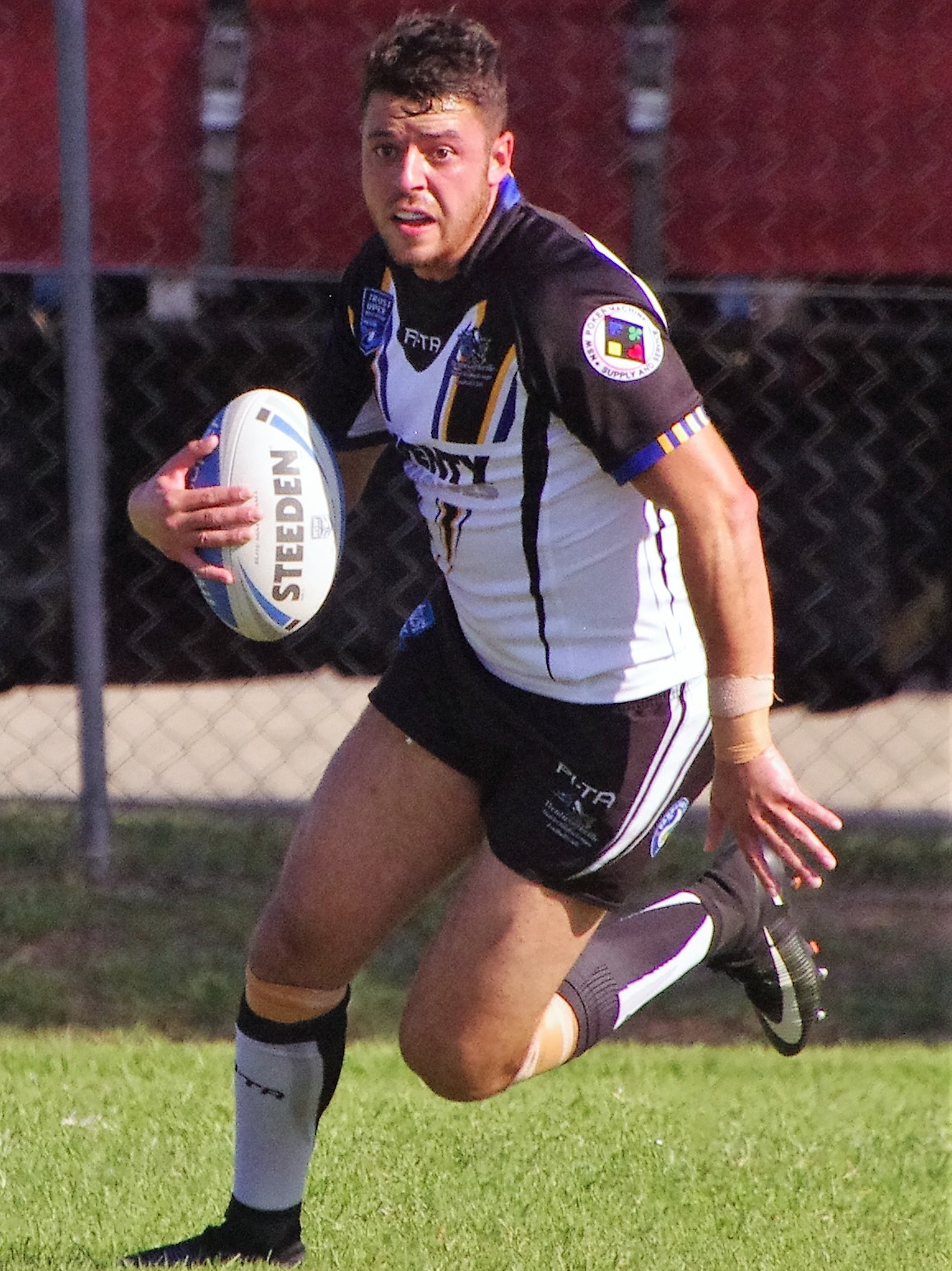

Personal information
- Born: 18 March 1994 (age 31); Blacktown, New South Wales, Australia
- Height: 185 cm (6 ft 1 in)
- Weight: 85 kg (13 st 5 lb)

Playing information
- Position: Centre
Club
Years	Team	Pld	T	G	FG	P
2015–16	Wests Tigers	6	0	0	0	0
Representative
Years	Team	Pld	T	G	FG	P
2017	Italy	3	2	0	0	8
- Source: As of 30 October 2017

Nathan Milone (born 18 March 1994) is an Italy international rugby league footballer who plays as a centre for the Wentworthville Magpies in the Intrust Super Premiership.

== Background ==
Milone was born in Blacktown, New South Wales, Australia and is of Italian descent.

He played his junior rugby league for the Toongabbie Tigers and the Dundas Shamrocks, before being signed by the Wests Tigers.

== Playing career ==
=== Early career ===
In 2013 and 2014, Milone played for the Wests Tigers' NYC team, captaining the side in 2014.

=== 2015 ===
In 2015, Milone moved on to the Tigers' New South Wales Cup team. In Round 13 of the 2015 NRL season, he made his NRL debut for the Tigers against the Gold Coast Titans.
