= Taane Milne =

Fiji international rugby league footballer

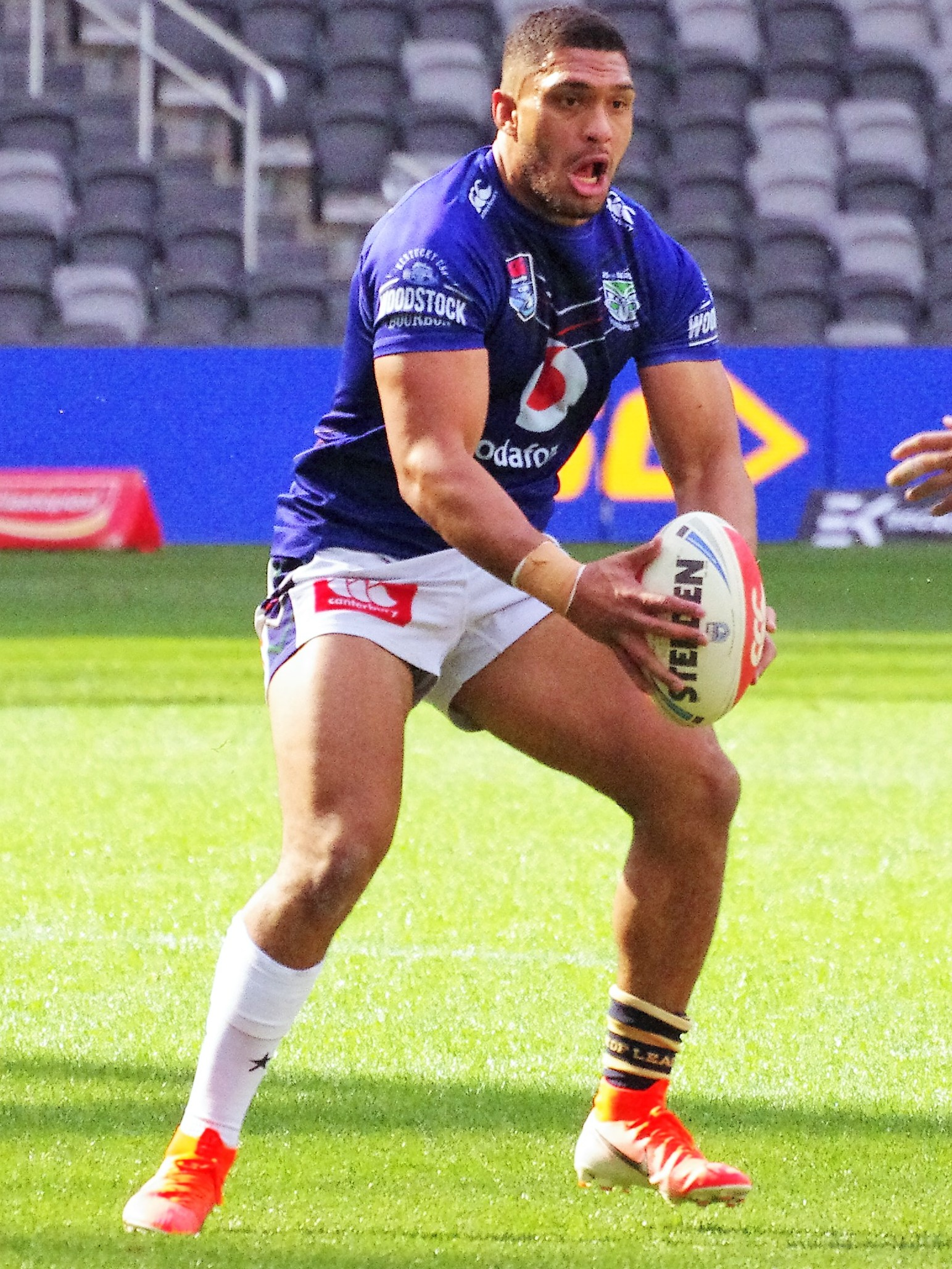

Personal information
- Full name: Taane William Milne
- Born: 19 May 1995 (age 31) Auckland, New Zealand
- Height: 6 ft 0 in (1.83 m)
- Weight: 15 st 8 lb (99 kg)

Playing information
- Position: Centre, Loose forward, Second-row
Club
Years	Team	Pld	T	G	FG	P
2016–17	St. George Illawarra	18	1	0	0	4
2019	New Zealand Warriors	1	0	0	0	0
2021–24	South Sydney Rabbitohs	69	24	1	0	98
2025–26	Huddersfield Giants	47	10	0	0	40
2027–	South Sydney Rabbitohs	0	0	0	0	0
	Total	135	35	1	0	142
Representative
Years	Team	Pld	T	G	FG	P
2017–	Fiji	20	6	16	0	56
2019	Fiji 9s	3	0	0	0	0
- Source: As of 17 November 2026

Taane Milne (born 19 May 1995) is a Fiji international rugby league footballer who plays as a centre, second-row or loose forward for the South Sydney Rabbitohs in the NRL.

He previously played for the St. George Illawarra Dragons, New Zealand Warriors and South Sydney Rabbitohs in the National Rugby League, and was briefly contracted to the Wests Tigers. Milne also played for the Mount Pritchard Mounties and the New Zealand Warriors in the Intrust Super Premiership.

== Background ==
Milne was born in Auckland, New Zealand. He is of Māori and Fijian descent. He moved to Australia at a young age.

He played his junior rugby league for the Clovelly Crocodiles and spent some time in rugby union whilst attending Randwick Boys High School and Newington College (2011–2013), where he played junior representative grades for Randwick as well as in New South Wales and Australian Schoolboys teams alongside future Parramatta Eels backrower Tepai Moeroa. He was then signed by the Sydney Roosters.

== Playing career ==
=== Early career ===
From 2013 to 2015, Milne played for the Sydney Roosters' NYC team. On 18 October 2014, he played for the Junior Kiwis against the Junior Kangaroos. He was again selected for the Junior Kiwis on 2 May 2015. Milne was released by the Roosters, with "a questionable work ethic, including being late for training and poor training performance, coupled with some minor off-field dramas" said to be contributing factors.

On 27 October 2015, he signed a two-year contract with the St. George Illawarra Dragons starting in 2016.

=== 2016 ===
In round 8, Milne made his NRL debut for the Dragons against the Sydney Roosters. After further games in reserve grade, he returned to centre in first grade for six games at the end of season. Teammate Benji Marshall said Milne "has one of the best in and aways and flick passes I've seen at training. He is a very talented kid."

He was named in the New Zealand Māori squad for a match against the New Zealand Residents on 15 October 2016.

=== 2017 ===
Milne played in 11 games in 2017, almost entirely from the bench. He scored his first try in round 11 against the Warriors, his sole match starting at centre for the season, and his only try for the year. On 6 May, Milne made his international debut for Fiji against Tonga in the 2017 Pacific Cup. Milne said, "I received a call from Mick Potter to play for Fiji against Samoa last year but I couldn't due to personal reasons. I was disappointed, but I had let him know that I was keen to play for Fiji this year. This has been an emotional moment for me. One of the best things about being in camp is the devotion time and learning some Fijian songs. This has been one of the best camps I have ever been in."

In June, Milne signed a two-year contract with the Wests Tigers starting in 2018.

Selected for Fiji in the World Cup at the end of the season, Milne scored two tries and kicked two goals in Fiji’s opening match against the USA. In his next game, he scored two tries and kicked three goals against Wales.

On 4 November, Milne signed a two-year deal with the New Zealand Warriors. Milne had written a letter to coach Stephen Kearney asking him for a second chance to play in the NRL. "I told him I'm not a drug addict," Milne said. "I wrote to him – spelling errors and all – telling him that I wanted to play in the NRL again. That I owned up to my errors and I was on the right track. I knew I could offer something to the club".

=== 2019 ===
In round 25 of the 2019 NRL season, Milne made his return to first grade and made his New Zealand Warriors debut against the Canberra Raiders.

=== 2020 ===
On February 15, Milne suffered a badly broken nose in the pre-season NRL Nines tournament. Then, in March, he suffered a season ending knee injury whilst playing for the New Zealand Canterbury Cup NSW team, and made no appearances in first grade for the season.

In October 2020, he signed a contract to join South Sydney for the 2021 NRL season.

=== 2021 ===
Milne made his club debut for South Sydney in round 10 of the 2021 NRL season against the Cronulla-Sutherland Sharks. In round 15, he scored his first try for Souths in a 46–0 victory over Brisbane, He never lost a game that year.

In round 17, Milne scored a hat-trick during South Sydney's 46–18 victory over North Queensland.

=== 2022 ===
In round 10 of the 2022 NRL season, Milne scored two tries for South Sydney in a 32–30 victory over the New Zealand Warriors. In round 25, Milne scored two tries in the first match to be played at the new Sydney Football Stadium. South Sydney would lose the match 26-16 to their arch-rivals, the Sydney Roosters. The following week in the elimination final, Milne was sin-binned twice in South Sydney's 30-14 upset victory over the Sydney Roosters. In the preliminary final against Penrith, Milne was sent off for a swinging arm to the head of Penrith player Spencer Leniu. South Sydney would go on to lose the match 32-12, and Milne was later suspended for six matches over the incident.

=== 2023 ===
In round 11 of the 2023 NRL season, Milne scored two tries for South Sydney in their 20-0 victory over the bottom-placed Wests Tigers. Milne played a total of 14 games for Souths in the 2023 NRL season as the club finished 9th on the table and missed the finals.

=== 2024 ===
Milne played 21 matches for South Sydney in the 2024 NRL season as the club endured a difficult campaign finishing second bottom on the table. On 29 November, it was announced that Milne had signed a two year deal with the Huddersfield Giants.

=== 2025 ===
He is squad number 23 at Huddersfield and made his competitive debut against Wigan coming off the bench in a 44-18 defeat.

Milne played 21 matches for Huddersfield in the 2025 Super League season as the club finished 10th on the table.

=== 2026 ===
On 12 November 2026 it was reported that he had signed for South Sydney Rabbitohs in the NRL on a 1-year deal.

== Statistics ==
Year	Team	Games	Tries	Goals	Pts
2016	St. George Illawarra Dragons	7			
2017	St. George Illawarra Dragons	11	1		4
2019	New Zealand Warriors	1			
2021	South Sydney Rabbitohs	12	8		32
2022	South Sydney Rabbitohs	22	10		40
2023	South Sydney Rabbitohs	14	2		8
2024	South Sydney Rabbitohs	21	4	1	18
2025	Huddersfield Giants	21	2		8
2026	Huddersfield Giants	25	8		32
2027	South Sydney Rabbitohs				
	Totals	118	20	1	118
