= Marcelo Montoya =

Fiji international rugby league footballer

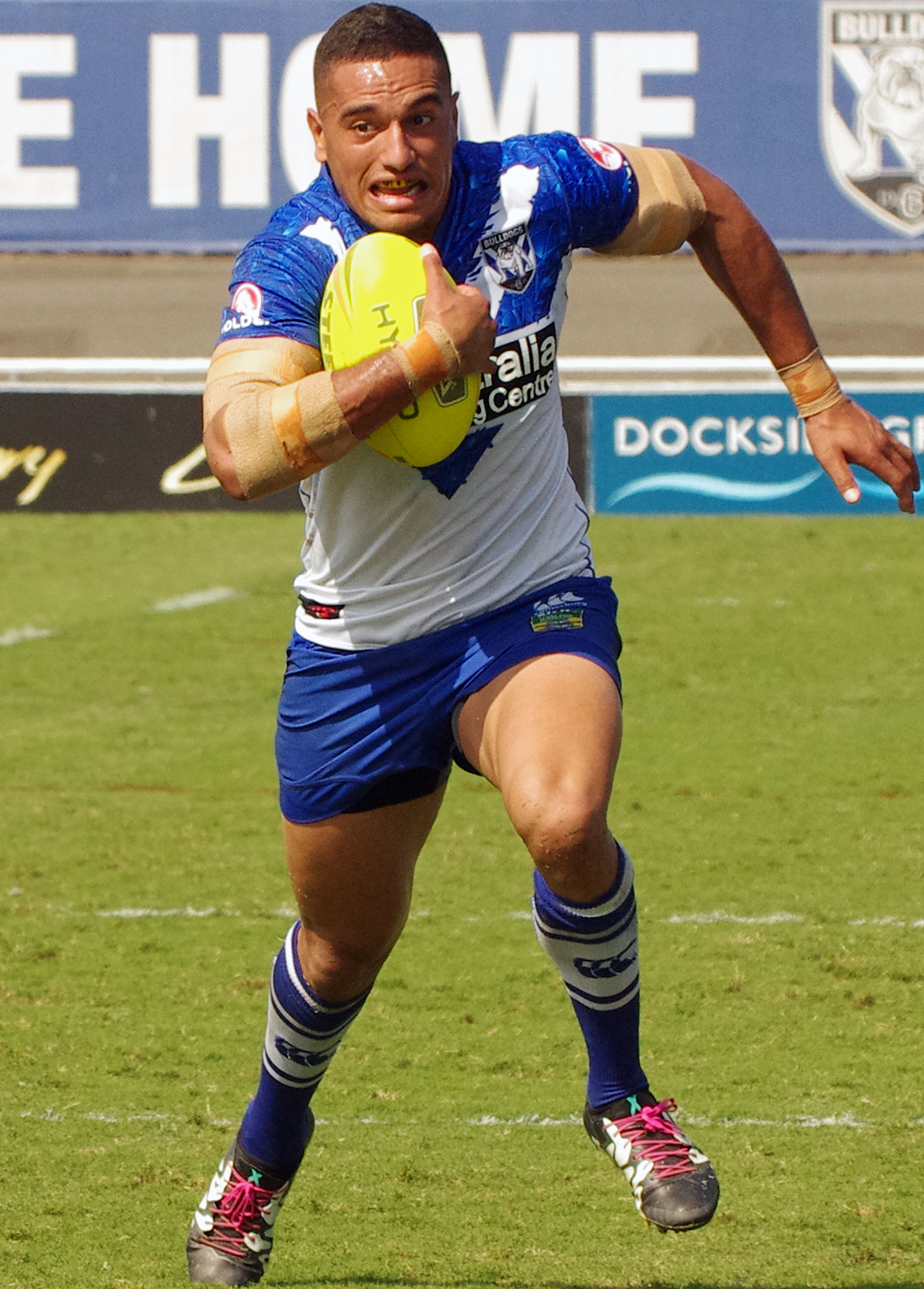

Personal information
- Full name: Marcelo Eduardo Montoya Jr
- Born: 17 February 1996 (age 30) Lautoka, Fiji
- Height: 189 cm (6 ft 2 in)
- Weight: 95 kg (14 st 13 lb)

Playing information
- Position: Wing, Centre
Club
Years	Team	Pld	T	G	FG	P
2017–20	Canterbury Bulldogs	55	19	0	0	76
2021–24	New Zealand Warriors	82	30	0	0	120
2025–26	Canterbury Bulldogs	25	9	0	0	36
	Total	162	58	0	0	232
Representative
Years	Team	Pld	T	G	FG	P
2016–19	Fiji	9	4	0	0	16
- Source: As of 20 November 2026

Marcelo Eduardo Montoya Jr (born 17 February 1996) is a Fijian Australian former professional rugby league footballer who played as a winger or centre for the Canterbury-Bankstown Bulldogs in the National Rugby League and Fiji at international level.

He previously played for the New Zealand Warriors in the NRL.

== Background ==
Montoya was born in Lautoka, Fiji to a Chilean father and Fijian mother, and moved to Campbelltown, New South Wales, Australia at the age of three.

He played his junior rugby league for the Bankstown Bulls and Macarthur Saints and attended both Patrician Brothers' College, Fairfield and Patrician Brothers' College, Blacktown.

== Playing career ==
=== Early career ===
Montoya was signed by the Canterbury-Bankstown Bulldogs and played in their Harold Matthews Cup team. He progressed through Canterbury's youth system, and played in their NYC team between 2014 and 2016, scoring 36 tries in 46 matches. The captain of the NYC team in 2016, he also played seven games in Canterbury's New South Wales Cup team that year, scoring six tries. On 8 October 2016, Montoya made his international debut for Fiji in an international against Samoa in Apia, playing on the wing and scoring a try in Fiji's 20–18 win.

=== 2017 ===
In February 2017, Montoya was named in Canterbury's 2017 NRL Auckland Nines squad. In round 3 of the 2017 NRL season, Montoya made his NRL debut for the Bulldogs against the New Zealand Warriors where he played on the wing and scored a try in the 24–12 win at Forsyth Barr Stadium in Dunedin, New Zealand. He is the first player of Chilean and South American descent to play in the NRL. He scored his first career double against the Newcastle Knights on the 7th April 2017 in a 22 points to 12 win.

On 6 June, Montoya re-signed with the Canterbury-Bankstown Bulldogs for a further three seasons until the end of 2020.

After a successful opening season in Montoya's career, the Canterbury-Bankstown Bulldogs named him their Rookie of the year.

=== 2018 ===
In 2018, Montoya made 15 appearances for Canterbury and scored two tries. In September, Montoya and other Canterbury players celebrated Mad Monday at The Harbour View Hotel in Sydney's CBD. Later in the night, photographs provided by the media showed Canterbury players heavily intoxicated, stripping naked and vomiting in the street. Montoya was pictured on the street asleep by photographers after vomiting earlier. He was handed a fine of $10,000 ($5000 suspended) by the club for his involvement.

=== 2019 ===
Montoya played the first two games of the 2019 season at centre as Canterbury suffered back to back heavy defeats against the New Zealand Warriors and the Parramatta Eels. He was subsequently one of five players demoted to reserve grade by coach Dean Pay.

After spending 7 weeks in reserve grade, Montoya was recalled to the Canterbury side for their Round 9 match against the Newcastle Knights which Canterbury lost 22–10.

In Round 18 against Brisbane, Montoya was taken from the field during the club's 28–6 loss with an apparent leg injury. Scans later revealed that Montoya would be ruled out for the rest of the season after it was shown he had tears to his posterior cruciate ligament, lateral ligament and medial meniscal ligament.

=== 2020 ===
Montoya made his return for Canterbury in round 8 of the 2020 NRL season, scoring a try in a 26–10 loss against Souths. In round 10 against St. George and with the scores locked at 22-22, Canterbury spread the ball left and a poor pass was thrown to Montoya who in turn dropped the ball. Saints player Corey Norman picked up the loose ball and raced away to score the match winning try on the full-time siren.

On 22 September, it was revealed that Montoya would be one of eight players released by Canterbury at the end of the 2020 NRL season as the club looked to rebuild.

=== 2021 ===
In round 4 of the 2021 NRL season, Montoya made his club debut for the New Zealand Warriors against the Sydney Roosters. In round 11 of the 2021 NRL season, Montoya scored two tries in a 30–26 victory over the Wests Tigers.

=== 2022 ===
In round 5 of the 2022 NRL season, Montoya used a homophobic slur against North Queensland winger Kyle Feldt in a match between their sides. The comment was picked up by in-game audio. Montoya was referred to the NRL judiciary and entered an early guilty plea. He was suspended for four matches. In round 10, Montoya scored two tries for New Zealand in their 32–30 loss against South Sydney. Montoya made a total of 18 appearances for the New Zealand club as they finished 15th on the table.

=== 2023 ===
In round 3 of the 2023 NRL season, Montoya scored two tries for New Zealand in a 26–12 victory over North Queensland. In round 19, Montoya scored two tries for New Zealand in their 46–10 victory over Parramatta Eels. Montoya played 27 games for the New Zealand Warriors in the 2023 NRL season and scored eleven tries as the club finished 4th on the table and qualified for the finals. Montoya played in all three finals games as the club reached the preliminary final before being defeated by Brisbane.

=== 2024 ===
Montoya played 19 games for the New Zealand Warriors in the 2024 NRL season and scored eight tries which saw the club finish 13th on the table. On 11 October 2024, the Warriors announced that Montoya had been released from his contract to return to Australia. The same day Montoya had re-joined the Canterbury-Bankstown Bulldogs in a two-year deal.

=== 2025 ===
In round 17 of the 2025 NRL season, Montoya played his 150th first grade match in Canterbury's 8–6 loss against Penrith. On 15 July, it was announced that Montoya would miss at least six weeks with a neck injury. Montoya played 18 matches for Canterbury in the 2025 NRL season as the club finished fourth and qualified for the finals. Canterbury would be eliminated from the finals in straight sets.

=== 2026 ===
On 17 June 2026, Montoya announced he would retire from the NRL at the end of the season. On 21 July 2026, Montoya announced his immediate retirement from the NRL, the Bulldogs confirmed that he would remain at the club in a behind the scenes role.

== Statistics ==
Season	Team	Matches	Tries	Pts
2017	Canterbury-Bankstown Bulldogs	19	12	48
2018	Canterbury-Bankstown Bulldogs	18	2	8
2019	Canterbury-Bankstown Bulldogs	11	2	8
2020	Canterbury-Bankstown Bulldogs	9	3	12
2021	New Zealand Warriors	18	5	20
2022	New Zealand Warriors	18	6	24
2023	New Zealand Warriors	27	11	44
2024	New Zealand Warriors	19	6	24
2025	Canterbury-Bankstown Bulldogs	18	8	32
2026	Canterbury-Bankstown Bulldogs	8	1	4
	Totals	162	58	232

*denotes season competing

== Personal life ==
As of May 2015, Montoya is working as a teacher's aide at Casula Public School. He has been an ambassador for Latin Heat Rugby League.

He married his wife Tayla on 14 October 2022. They have a podcast together.
