= List of Patrician Brothers' College, Fairfield Alumni =

This is a list of notable past students of Patrician Brothers' College, Fairfield. Alumni of the school are known as "Old Boys " and are supported by the Fairfield Patrician Brothers Old Boys Union.

== A ==
- Greg Alexander – former rugby league player and Fox Sports commentator

== B ==
- David Bradbury – former Mayor of Penrith; MP for the Division of Lindsay in Western Sydney
- Nathan Brown – current rugby league player for the Parramatta Eels
- Walter Bugno – businessman

== C ==
- Nick Carle – former Joey and Olyroo; Socceroo; Crystal Palace (England – Championship)
- Joseph Carrozzi AM – Football Australia; Chairman of Finance, Risk and Audit Committee. Western Sydney University Board Member and Strategic Business Advisor.
- Garen Casey – former rugby league player and Australian Schoolboy
- Dean Collis – former rugby league player and Australian Schoolboy

== D ==
- David Danes – former superleague player and Australian Schoolboy
- Barry Davis – former Western Suburbs Magpies player

== F ==
- Manase Fainu – current Rugby league player, for Manly Sea Eagles
- Samuela Fainu – current Rugby league player, for Manly Sea Eagles
- Buddy Farah – former Soccer player and current Football Agent
- Andrew Frew – former rugby league player
- Emanuele Fuamatu – 2012 Olympian, 2012 Australian Shot Put Champion

== G ==
- Nathan Gardner – Cronulla Sharks in the NRL
- Scott Geddes – former rugby league player
- Kieran Gilbert – journalist
- Tim Gilbert – journalist
- Glenn Grief – former rugby league player and Australian Schoolboy
- Joey Grima – former National Rugby League and Super League coach

== H ==
- Kieron Herring – former rugby league player and Australian Schoolboy
- Ian Hindmarsh – former rugby league player
- Nathan Hindmarsh – former Parramatta Eels player; former NSW and Australia representative

== J ==
- Steven Jolly – former rugby league player

== L ==
- Paul Langmack – former professional rugby league footballer, now coach
- Mark Levy – former rugby league player and ABC commentator
- Brett Lobb – former rugby league player

== M ==
- Max Mannix – former rugby league player and Australian Schoolboy
- Michael Masi – former F1 director and current Chairman of the Supercars Commission in Australia.
- Warren McDonnell – former rugby league player and current Football Operations & Recruitment Manager for the Wests Tigers
- Andrew McIlwaine – former rugby league player and Australian Schoolboy
- Daniel Merza – award-winning international speaker and author
- D'Rhys Miller – Fiji national rugby league team representative
- Marcelo Montoya – current New Zealand Warriors player
- Justin Morgan – former rugby player and current coach
- John Muggleton - former Parramatta Eels and NSW Rugby League Representative

== N ==
- Mitch Newton – former rugby league player
- Remo Nogarotto – football (soccer) administrator

== O ==
- Paul Okon – former Socceroos captain; Olyroos Squad Barcelona '92; Former Newcastle Jets FC captain

== P ==
- Ronny Palumbo – current rugby league player for London Broncos
- Taniela Paseka – current Rugby league player, for Manly Sea Eagles
- Darren Pettet – former rugby league player

== R ==
- Dietrich Roache – represented Australia in the Rugby 7's
- Ben Roberts – former rugby league player and Australian Schoolboy
- Wade Russel – former rugby league player and Australian Schoolboy

== S ==
- David Saliba – Fairfield State MP
- Peter Sharne – former Socceroo and Marconi
- Chris Smith – former 2GB broadcaster
- Peter Sterling OAM – former Parramatta Eels player; former NSW and Australia representative; former commentator for Nine Network and member of the Sport Australia's Hall of Hame. Order of Australian Medal recipient

== T ==
- Justin Truong – Co-founder & CEO of PUSHAS. Forbes 30 Under 30 2022 (Asia – Retail & Commerce)

== V ==
- Francis Vaiotu – former rugby league player
- Michael Vella – former rugby league player, NSW and Australian Representative

== W ==
- Michael Wenden AM – Australian swimming champion and Gold medal Olympian
- Josh White – former rugby league player
- Kyle White – former rugby league player and Australian Schoolboy

== Z ==
- Paul Zadro – Chairman of the International Sports Karate Association in Australia
- David Zdrilic – former Olyroo; Capped Socceroo; Sydney FC
- Bernard Zuel – journalist
