= Patrician Brothers' College, Fairfield =

- Patrician Brothers' College classrooms

Location
- Fairfield, south-western Sydney, New South Wales; Australia; 33°52′19″S 150°57′43″E

Information
- Type: Independent comprehensive single-sex secondary day school
- Motto: Latin: Maria Duce (Mary Leads Us)
- Religious affiliation: Patrician Brothers
- Denomination: Roman Catholic
- Established: 1953; 73 years ago
- Sister school: Mary MacKillop College, Wakeley
- Oversight: Sydney Catholic Schools, Archdiocese of Sydney, Diocese of Parramatta
- Principal: Peter Wade
- Employees: ~73
- Years: 7–12
- Gender: Boys
- Enrolment: c. 1,200 (2024)
- Colours: Royal blue and sky blue
- Website: pbcfairfield.syd.catholic.edu.au

Patrician Brothers' College, Fairfield (abbreviated as PBCF) is an independent Roman Catholic comprehensive single-sex secondary day school for boys, located in Fairfield, a western suburb of Sydney, New South Wales, Australia.

Founded in the tradition of Bishop Daniel Delany in 1953, the college formerly catered for students in Years 5 to 12, however the primary section was merged into the local parish primary school and closed in 2006. Today the school enrolls approximately 1150 high school aged students from the parishes of Villawood, Fairfield, Cabramatta and Smithfield. 85% of the student population are from non-English speaking backgrounds. The administration of the school is overseen by Sydney Catholic Schools.

In the 2009 Higher School Certificate (HSC), the college was ranked in the top 57 schools in New South Wales, and is ranked in the Top 12 Catholic Schools in Sydney and in the Top 3 Catholic Schools in the Southern Region.

== History ==
=== Establishment ===
In August 1948, the Brothers received a letter from Archbishop O'Brien on behalf of Norman Cardinal Gilroy, requesting staff for a new boys' school planned for Fairfield. At this time, Fairfield was an outer and rapidly expanding suburb of Sydney with a large concentration of post war migrants from Europe. While there was a primary convent school at nearby Cabramatta, Smithfield and Villawood, there was no opportunities for senior primary and secondary Catholic Education for boys in Fairfield.

Provincial, Brother Norbert and his Council agreed to the Cardinal's request and Brother Kevin Samuel, Brother Eugene Kelly and Brother Peter Johnson (Superior and Principal) formed the first Patrician Community at Fairfield. The Brothers took up residence in an old weatherboard cottage which was on the 10 hectare property, which had recently been acquired by the Archdiocese as a site for the school.

When Cardinal Gilroy blessed the monastery and officially opened the school on 13 March 1953, there were 170 pupils enrolled in Years 4, 5 and 6, in a year, this number almost doubled. The original classrooms were in brick, and separated by concrete quadrangles with trees everywhere. That pattern of building was retained and was repeated regularly to cope with the expanding enrolment which ten years later had reached almost one thousand. The grounds in which the school was situated were a disused orchard and vineyard – uneven and ungrassed and abounding in powdery surface soil. In the early sixties, the Brothers, supported by parents and students, embarked on a levelling, grass-planting and tree-planting campaign which was the foundation of the environment in which today's large complex is situated.

From six classrooms in 1953, the pupil accommodation has grown to over forty classrooms in 1982, as well as a library and assembly hall, science laboratories, a modern manual arts block and various other specialist facilities. The college is the largest single campus enrolment of any Boys' Catholic School in New South Wales.

=== Early developments ===
In its early years, the college enrolled students from established Australian families, as well as those of Eastern European, Maltese and Italian backgrounds. Over time, the student population became more diverse, including second-generation Italian and Maltese Australians and students of Middle Eastern, South American and Indochinese backgrounds.

1956 was the year in which the students sat for the first public examination – the Intermediate Certificate – for candidates of present Year 9 age. The Intermediate level was the terminating year in the school until 1961, when the first group of students sat for the Leaving Certificate. This development marked a significant event in the life of the school as the first Leaving Certificate class contained students from Patrician Brothers' Schools at Blacktown, Granville and Liverpool. This intake of students from other Patrician Schools for their final years of secondary schooling continued until these areas gained their own senior secondary school.

=== Golden Jubilee ===
In 2003, Patrician Brothers' College celebrated its 50th Golden Jubilee year. The celebrations included a Golden Jubilee Opening Mass at St. Mary's Cathedral, Sydney, presided by Cardinal George Pell and concelebrated by priests from Fairfield, Cabramatta, Smithfield and Villawood parishes, as well as priests who are old boys of the college. Other celebrations included an Old Boys' Reunion Dinner and a staff reunion, a golden jubilee ball and a concert, plus closing ceremony in December.

=== 21st Century ===
On 25 June 2000, several years of construction on the campus came to an end with the official opening and blessing of the new College facilities and classrooms. The old Year 8, 9, 10, and Primary blocks made way for an entirely new complex of buildings including a new library, Science wing, College hall and gymnasium, and Music and Creative Arts centre. The old senior block was completely renovated, what was once the College hall and library became the administration and staff areas. These facilities have continually been improved, with the refurbishment of the Science Centre, the introduction of lifts and WiFi within the college.

=== Primary school closure ===
In 1993 the primary school of the College moved across the creek to take up residence at the Weston Street Campus, then occupied by Our Lady of the Rosary, Primary School. A Brother remained Principal there until 2003.

The Catholic Education Office decided that the Weston Street campus was unsustainable for the growing primary school. There were proposals to remerge the Primary School with the Secondary College. However, the Catholic Education Office decided that the most viable option was to allow students in Years 5 & 6 to continue their education with their feeder primary schools.

At the end of 2006, Patrician Brothers' College Primary School closed, and the grounds were returned to the Our Lady of the Rosary Parish to use. Patrician Brothers' College Primary School Fairfield was the last primary school to close which was affiliated with the Patrician Brothers.

=== World Youth Day cross and icon ===
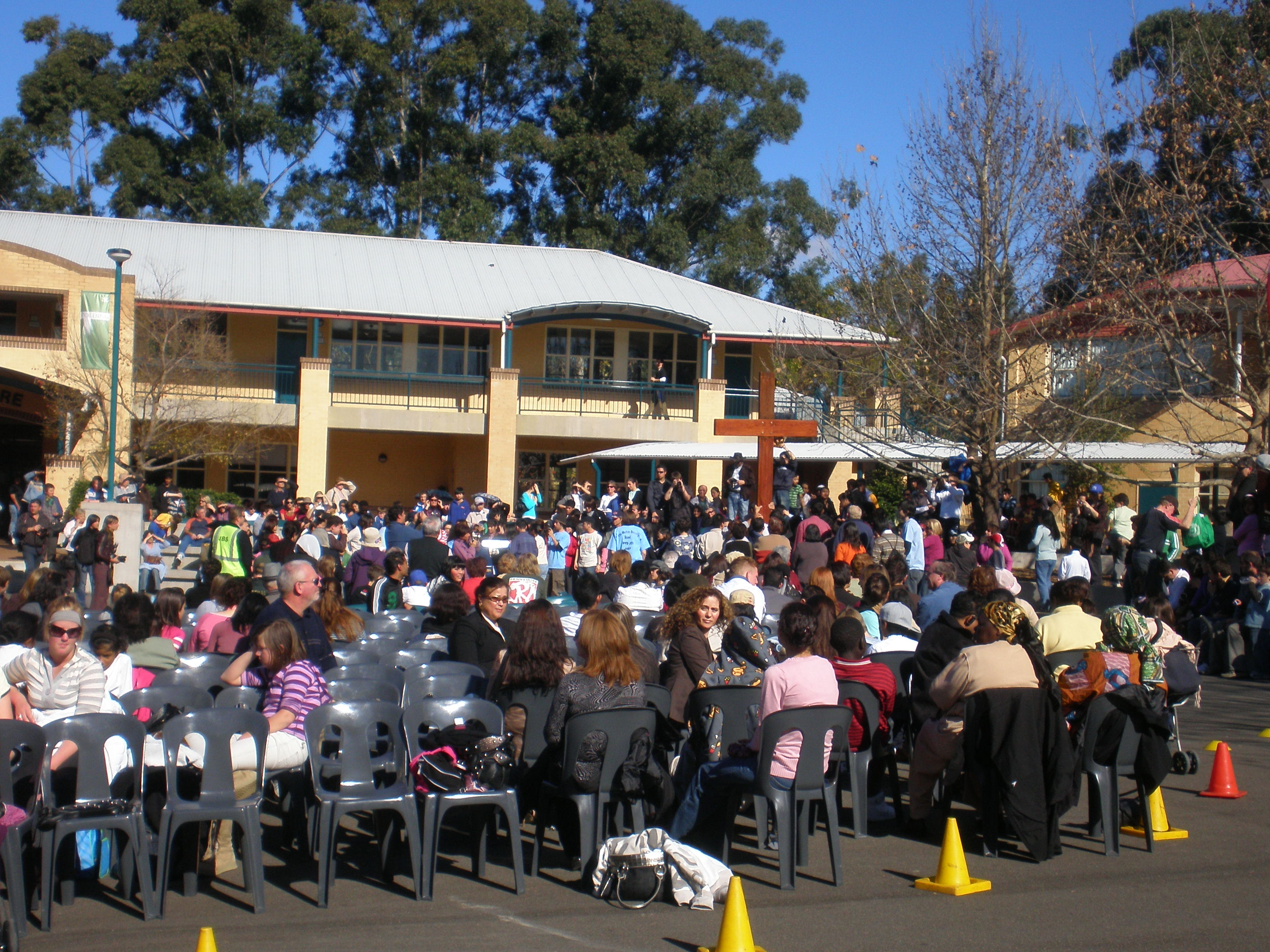
Patrician Brothers' College hosting the WYD cross and icon

Patrician Brothers' College was chosen to be the first school in Australia to host the World Youth Day (WYD) cross and icon upon its arrival in Australia for the Sydney 2008 World Youth Day celebrations. The Catholic Archdiocese of Sydney entrusted the Western Deanery (officially, a geographical region in South-West Sydney that comprises 16 Sydney Archdiocese parishes) with the WYD cross and icon for the day of 2 July 2007. The WYD cross and icon was hosted Patrician Brothers College, Fairfield for three hours that day for public veneration, which was attended by 5,000 people.

=== Patrician bicentenary celebrations ===
The Patrician Brothers were established by Bishop Daniel Delany in 1808 in the Name of St Patrick and in 2008, the Patrician Brothers celebrate their 200th anniversary. The following Patrician linked schools joined in and celebrated the Patrician bicentenary:

- Holy Cross College Ryde
- All Saints Catholic College, Liverpool
- Patrician Brothers' College Blacktown
- Delany College

The college has had two major bicentenary celebrations:

- St. Patrick's Day – a mass was held at the State's Sport Centre on 17 March, with over 5000 people attending – celebrated by Bishop David Cremin and guests included the Superior General of the Patrician Order, Brother Jerome, the entire Patrician Brothers Congregation of NSW and abroad and members of parliament.
- Patrician Bicentenary Concert – this was celebrated on 30 April, at Acer Arena with musical performances from all the patrician colleges.
- Concluding Mass – The concluding Mass was held in Tullow Ireland (the birthplace of the Patrician Order) and was attended by various Brothers of the Patrician Order and Principals of Patrician schools from across the globe.

== Headmasters ==
=== Patrician Principals ===
Period	Headmaster
1953–1958	Brother Peter Johnson f.s.p.
1959–1962	Brother Alyosius Delany f.s.p.
1963–1964	Brother Baptist Stenning
1965–1967	Brother Charles Barry f.s.p.
1968–1980	Brother Aengus Kavanagh f.s.p.
1981–1986	Brother Christopher Finucane f.s.p.
1987–1990	Brother Mark Ryan f.s.p.
1991–2001	Brother Bernard Bulfin f.s.p.

=== Lay Principals ===
Headmaster	Period	Notable Achievement
Michael Krawec	2002–2006	First Lay Principal and Old Boy
Wayne Marshall (Acting)	2007	
John Killeen	2008–2015	
Peter Wade	2016–present	Old Boy

In 2001, the last Patrician Principal of the college, Br. Bernard Bulfin, retired, and was replaced by the college's first lay principal, Michael Krawec, ending 48 years of leadership by the Brothers of St. Patrick. However, Br. Nicholas Harsas remained as principal of Patrician Brothers' Primary, until 2003 when he was replaced by Warren Loy. The primary closed at the end of 2006.

During 2007, Michael Krawec, was appointed to the Catholic Education Office and the governors elected Wayne Marshall as the temporary Principal. At the end of 2007 the CEO appointed John Killeen to principalship. In 2016 Peter Wade, once a student at the college, became Principal.

== Facilities ==
=== Learning facilities ===
Patrician Brothers' College spent six years and $14m redeveloping and rebuilding classrooms, Jubilee Hall, music, IT, visual arts, science, administration, technology and applied studies centres and the college chapel.

=== Technology ===
The college has undertaken a five-year technology roll over period. The College recently purchased and installed new computers in the Information and Technology Centre, new laptops and light probe projectors, 5 portable projection systems which are used for student presentations in the ITC, TAS and science blocks, a new computer lab in the science block, and several touch sensitive SmartBoards. Technology is being incorporated in all lessons and is utilised as a teaching aid in the senior school. Additional fixed SmartBoard and Data Projector units have been installed in over 90% of the student learning areas and classrooms.

With the provision of the Rudd government's "Digital Education Revolution" Patrician Brothers College Fairfield will be one of the first schools to provide specially customised Apple MacBook's to over 400 Years 9 and 10 students in 2009. In commitment to this scheme, all students who enter Year 9 at the college will be provided with their own personal laptop computer to be used through their remaining time at the college. In 2011, Year 7 and 8 students are to purchase their own Apple MacBooks due to a policy change within the current Gillard government.

To facilitate this rollout scheme, the college has implemented wireless WiFi network in 2009–2010. This $40 000 project seeing new wireless access points being installed across campus and Intranet capabilities being expanded to cover 95% of the school grounds including the school oval. Electrical infrastructure such as digital projectors have also been installed on the entire college campus.

== Curriculum ==
=== Gifted and talented ===
The curriculum incorporates enrichment and the opportunity of extension in all courses. Acceleration is possible in individual courses (such as Mathematics and Mathematics Extension 1 and 2). Acceleration has proven successful for the college, with many of its students achieving Band 6s in their accelerated courses.

=== Sport ===
The college was once involved in the Metropolitan Catholic Schools (MCS) Competitions and now competes in the newly established Sydney Catholic Schools (SCS) competition. Patrician Brothers' is also involved in the Combined Catholic Colleges, State Competitions and other competitions including the Parramatta Knockout.

Patrician Brothers' College, Fairfield, is recognised as a "famed renowned rugby league nursery, " with many notable players going on to represent various NRL teams and achieving state and national honours. The college has a strong history in the sport, winning the NRL Schoolboy Cup six times and the NRL Schoolboy Trophy Cup in 2018. Most recently, the college clinched the 2022 NRL Schoolboy Cup. Rugby League remains the dominant sport at Patrician Brothers', further solidifying its legacy in nurturing top-tier rugby talent.

=== Mock trial ===
The 2007 Mock trial team was the most successful in the Patrician Brothers' College, Fairfield history, winning the Sydney regional competition, against schools such as The King's School and other private and selective schools.

=== Debating ===
The 2008 Debating Senior Debating team completed another first for the college, becoming the first side to take the NSW Catholic State Title for Patrician Brothers' College.

== Notable alumni ==
Alumni of Patrician Brothers' College are known as 'Old Boys' and may join the school's alumni association, the Old Boys' Union. Some notable Patrician Brothers' College Old Boys include

=== Entertainment, media and the arts ===
- Greg Alexander – former rugby league player for the Penrith Panthers and New Zealand Warriors. Currently a Fox Sports commentator
- Kieran Gilbert – journalist for Sky News Australia
- Tim Gilbert – sports journalist for Sky News Australia
- Mark Levy – former rugby league player for the Parramatta Eels, Balmain Tigers and Penrith Panthers and ABC commentator
- Luke Nguyen – Australian chef, restaurateur and television presenter.
- John O'Donnell – former music editor for The Rolling Stones and founder of Australian music magazine Juice
- Chris Smith – former 2GB broadcaster
- Peter Sterling OAM – former Parramatta Eels player; former New South Wales and Australia representative; former commentator for Nine Network and member of the Sport Australia's Hall of Hame. Order of Australian Medal recipient.
- Gene Pierson – musician
- Bernard Zuel – journalist for The Age and The Sydney Morning Herald

=== Politics, public service and business ===
- David Bradbury – former Mayor of Penrith; MP for the Division of Lindsay in Western Sydney
- Walter Bugno – businessman
- Andrew Hrsto – Owner and Founder of ALAND.
- Michael Masi – former Formula One director and current Chairman of the Supercars Commission in Australia.
- Remo Nogarotto – football (soccer) administrator
- David Saliba – Fairfield State MP
- Les Schirato – renowned as "Australia’s Coffee King," Australian entrepreneur and the chief executive officer of Vittoria Food & Beverage (Cantarella Bros)
- Paul Zadro – Chairman of the ISKA (sports governing body) in Australia

=== Sports ===
- Tevita Amone – former rugby league player for the Western Suburbs Magpies and North Queensland Cowboys
- Nathan Brown – current rugby league player for the Parramatta Eels and the Manly Warringah Sea Eagles
- Nick Carle – former Joey and Olyroo; Socceroo; Crystal Palace (England – Championship)
- Garen Casey – former rugby league player for Parramatta Eels, Penrith Panthers and Wakefield Trinity and Australian Schoolboy
- Steve Calderan – former Marconi Stallions FC and Australia men's national soccer team
- Dean Collis – former rugby league player for the Cronulla-Sutherland Sharks and Australian Schoolboy
- Barry Davis – former Western Suburbs Magpies player
- Manase Fainu – current Rugby league player, for Manly Sea Eagles
- Samuela Fainu – current Rugby league player, for Manly Sea Eagles and the Wests Tigers
- Allan Fitzgibbon – current Rugby league player for the Gold Coast Titans
- Buddy Farah – former Soccer player for the Marconi Stallions FC and current Football Agent
- Emanuele Fuamatu – 2012 Olympian, 2012 Australian Shot Put Champion
- Jezaiah Funa – current Rugby league player for the Parramatta Eels
- Andrew Frew – former rugby league player for the Parramatta Eels and Manly Warringah Sea Eagles
- Nathan Gardner – former rugby league player for the Cronulla Sharks
- Scott Geddes – former rugby league player for South Sydney Rabbitohs
- Glenn Grief – former rugby league player for the Western Suburbs Magpies, Newcastle Knights, South Sydney Rabbitohs and Australian Schoolboy
- Joey Grima – former National Rugby League and Super League coach for the London Broncos
- Ian Hindmarsh – former rugby league player for the Parramatta Eels and the Canberra Raiders
- Nathan Hindmarsh – former Parramatta Eels player; former New South Wales and representative.
- Steven Jolly – former rugby league player for the Parramatta Eels and Balmain Tigers
- Tony Krslovic – former soccer player for Sydney United 58 FC
- Paul Langmack – former professional rugby league footballer for the Canterbury-Bankstown Bulldogs, now coach
- Brett Lobb – former rugby league player for the Cronulla-Sutherland Sharks and Balmain Tigers
- Warren McDonnell – former rugby league player and current Football Operations & Recruitment Manager for the Wests Tigers
- Gabriel Mendez - former soccer player for the Admira Wacker and Notts County (also known as Gigi)
- D'Rhys Miller – Fiji national rugby league team representative and formerly played for Western Suburbs Magpies
- Jordan Miller – current Rugby league player for the Wests Tigers and Australian Schoolboy
- Marcelo Montoya – current New Zealand Warriors player
- Justin Morgan – former rugby player for the Canberra Raiders and New Zealand Warriors and current coach
- John Muggleton – former Parramatta Eels and NSW Rugby League Representative
- Mitch Newton – former rugby league player for the Canterbury-Bankstown Bulldogs
- Paul Okon – former Socceroos captain; Olyroos Squad Barcelona '92; Former Newcastle Jets FC captain
- Taniela Paseka – current Rugby league player, for Manly Sea Eagles
- Darren Pettet – former rugby league player for the New Zealand Warriors
- Ronny Palumbo – current rugby league player for London Broncos
- Mirjan Pavlović – former Sydney United 58 FC player
- Dietrich Roache – represented Australia in the 2020 Summer Olympics and the 2024 Summer Olympics in the Rugby 7's
- Ben Roberts – former rugby league player for the Canterbury-Bankstown Bulldogs and Western Suburbs Magpies and Australian Schoolboy
- Peter Sharne – former Socceroo and Marconi Stallions FC
- Tony Wall – former rugby league player for the Western Suburbs Magpies
- Mark Watson – former rugby league player for Parramatta Eels and Canterbury-Bankstown Bulldogs
- Michael Wenden AM – Australian swimming champion. Represented Australia in the 1968 Summer Olympics and 1972 Summer Olympics. Setting World Records in the 100 and 200 freestyle respectively
- Josh White – former rugby league player for the Western Suburbs Magpies and Illawarra Steelers
- Kyle White – former rugby league player for the Western Suburbs Magpies and the Canterbury-Bankstown Bulldogs and Australian Schoolboy
- Steve Fanale – former rugby league player for Parramatta Eels and Balmain Tigers
- Francis Vaiotu – former rugby league player for the Sydney Roosters
- Michael Vella – former rugby league player for the Parramatta Eels, New South Wales and Australia Representative
- Christian Vieri – former football player for Juventus, SS Lazio, Inter Milan. A part of the FIFA 100. Whilst becoming the most expensive players in 1999 when Inter Milan paid Lazio £32 million (€43 million) for his services.
- Max Vieri – former football player for Juventus FC.
- Chris Yates – former rugby league player for the Western Suburbs Magpies
- David Zdrilic – former Australia men's national soccer team, Sydney FC, football pundit and current manager for Perth Glory FC

== See also ==
- List of Catholic schools in New South Wales
- Patrician Brothers
- Catholic education in Australia
