= Guildford Owls =

Australian rugby league club, based in Guildford, NSW

Club information
- Full name: Guildford Owls
- Nickname: The Owls
- Colours: Gold; Maroon
- Founded: 1953; 73 years ago
- Website: Official website

Current details
- Ground: McCredie Park
- Coach: Paul
- Competition: Ron Massey Cup; Sydney Metropolitan Women's Rugby League; Parramatta Rugby League; Sydney Shield

The Guildford Owls are a rugby league club based in Guildford, New South Wales, Australia. They have previously competed in the Ron Massey Cup, the Sydney Shield and have also competed in the Sydney Metropolitan Women's Rugby League.

== History ==
Guildford were founded in 1953, although the leagues club at Guildford was founded much earlier—in the 1920s.

Guildford have spent much of their existence playing in the lower leagues of the New South Wales Rugby League competitions. One of Parramatta's greatest ever players, Brett Kenny grew up playing as a Guildford junior.

In 1991, Guildford won the Ron Massey Cup which was then known as the Metropolitan Cup. In 2018, the Sydney Shield side reached the grand final against East Campbelltown Eagles but were defeated 32-22 at Leichhardt Oval.

== Notable players ==
- John Mowbray (1959-68 Western Suburbs)
- Mick Pattison (1978-80 & 1983-84 Parramatta Eels, 1981-82 South Sydney Rabbitohs, and 1985-86 Illawarra Steelers)
- Brett Kenny (1980-93 Parramatta Eels)
- Tim Mannah (2009-19 Parramatta Eels)
- Jon Mannah (2009-12 Parramatta Eels & Cronulla)
- Jake Foster (2010-14 Canberra Raiders & Canterbury-Bankstown Bulldogs)
- Daniel Tupou (2012- Sydney Roosters)
- Manase Fainu (2018- Manly-Warringah Sea Eagles)
- Tevita Funa (2020-2022 Manly-Warringah Sea Eagles & New South Wales Waratahs)
- Samuela Fainu (2023- Manly-Warringah Sea Eagles & Wests Tigers)
- Sione Fainu (2024- Wests Tigers)
- Latu Fainu (2024- Wests Tigers)

== Honours ==
- Ron Massey Cup Winners

1991

- Sydney Shield Runners Up

2018

== Playing Record in NSWRL Competitions ==
In three different time-periods, Guildford has entered teams in lower tier competitions run by the New South Wales Rugby League.
The win–loss–draw record in the table below does not include Finals Series matches.

Year	Competition	Pos	Plyd	W	L	D	B	For	Agst	Diff	Pts	Finals Position
1963	Inter-District	4	18	12	6	0		161	81	80	24	Finalist
1964	Second Division	4	18	12	6	0	0	279	68	211	24	
1965	Second Division	6	17	9	7	1	0	210	201	9	19	
1990	Metropolitan Cup	4									18	Semi-Finalist
1991	Metropolitan Cup	1									25	Premiers
1992	Metropolitan Cup	7	16	6	8	2	2	286	299	-13	18	
1993	Metropolitan Cup	1	16	10	4	2	2	311	234	77	26	Finalist
1994	Metropolitan Cup	5	21	10	11	0	0	410	417	-7	20	
1995	Metropolitan Cup	4	18	9	8	1	2	365	397	-32	25	
1996	Metropolitan Cup	3	16	11	4	1	2	406	294	112	27	Semi-Finalist
1997	Metropolitan Cup	2	14								20	
1998	Metropolitan Cup	6	18	7	9	2	0	338	340	-2	16	
1999	Metropolitan Cup	4	16	9	8	1		424	347	77	19	Semi-Finalist
2000	Metropolitan Cup	7	14	4	10	0	0	254	358	-104	8	
2001	Metropolitan Cup	5	18	9	9	0	3	388	440	-52	24	
2002	Metropolitan Cup	4	15	8	7	0	0	331	329	2	16	Finalist
2003	Jim Beam Cup	7	22	9	11	2	0	500	569	-69	20	
2013	Ron Massey Cup	9	22	9	13	0	0	565	734	-169	18	
2014	Ron Massey Cup	6	22	12	10	0	0	594	536	58	24	Last 6 Semi-Finalist
2015	Ron Massey Cup	5	20	9	10	1	2	529	543	-14	23	Top 8 Elimination Semi-Finalist
2016	Ron Massey Cup	7	20	9	10	1	2	518	445	73	23	Last 6 Semi-Finalist
2017	Ron Massey Cup	5	18	9	8	1	7	430	388	42	33	Last 4 Preliminary Finalist
2018	Ron Massey Cup	5	18	11	7	0	2	455	351	104	26	Top 8 Elimination Semi-Finalist
2019	Ron Massey Cup	5	20	10	9	1	2	472	492	-20	25	Top 8 Elimination Semi-Finalist
2020	Ron Massey Cup	N/A	1	0	0	0	1	0	0	0	2	Competition Cancelled

== See also ==
- List of rugby league clubs in Australia
- Rugby league in New South Wales

== Sources ==
Years	Acronym	Item	Available Online	Via
1920 to 1973	RLN	Rugby League News	Yes	Trove
1972-76, 78, 80-81, 1991-96, 1998-2009	-	New South Wales Rugby League Annual Report	No	State Library of NSW
2014-19	-	New South Wales Rugby League Annual Report	Yes	NSWRL website
2003 to 2014	RLW	Rugby League Week	Yes	eResources at State Library of NSW
1974 to 2019	BL	Big League	No	State Library of NSW
2010 to 2019	-	Various Newspaper Websites	Yes	As referenced
