= Chris Yates =

Chris Yates may refer to:

- Chris Yates (fisherman), angler, photographer and writer
- Chris Yates (rugby league), Australian rugby league footballer
- Chris Yates (rugby union) (born 1971), New Zealand rugby union footballer
- Chris Yates (The Inbetweeners), a minor character in this British sitcom

== See also ==
- Kris Yates, fictional character in Bad Girls
