= Latu Fainu =

Tonga international rugby league footballer

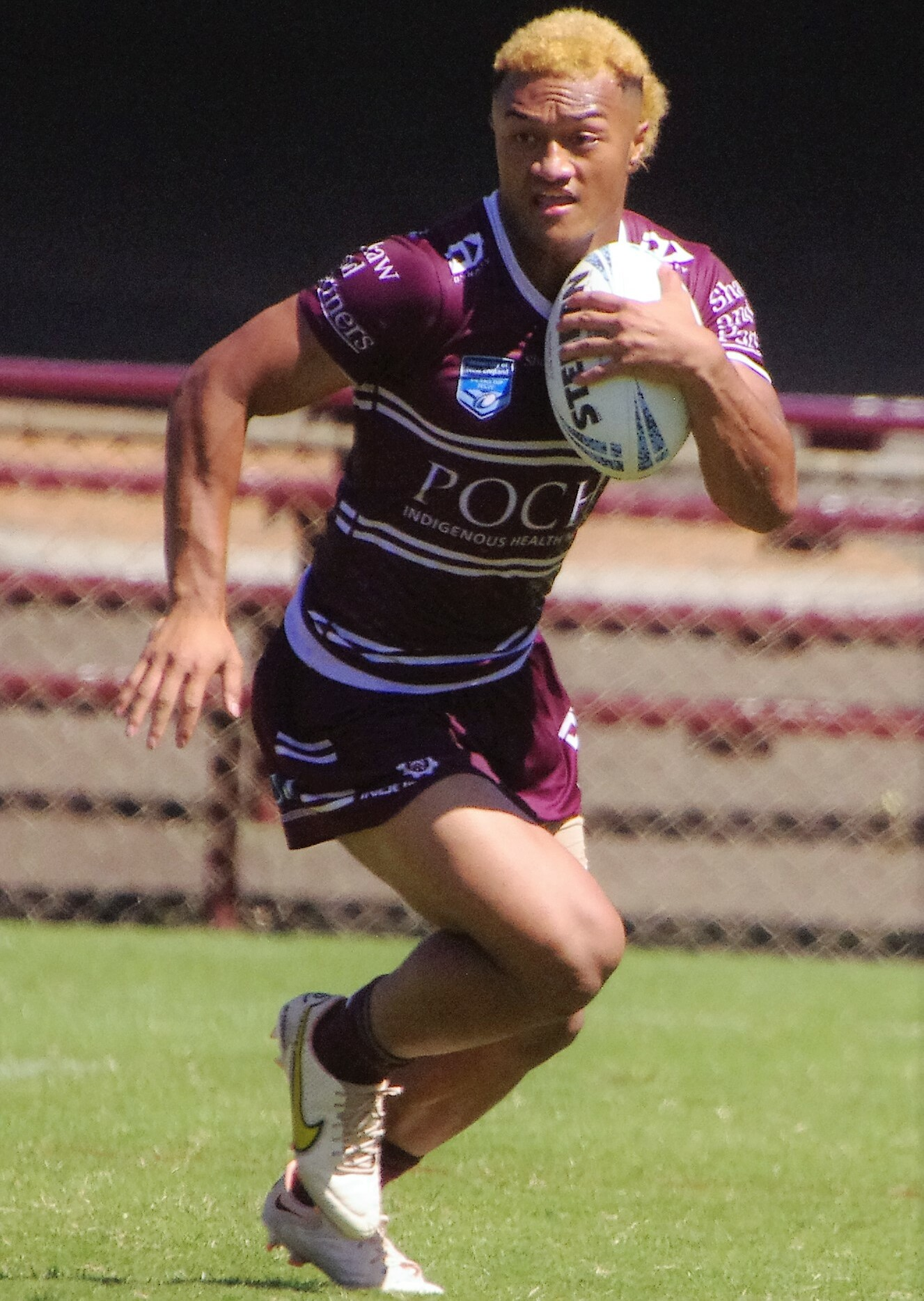

Personal information
- Full name: Latu Fainu
- Born: 28 May 2005 (age 21) Guildford, New South Wales, Australia
- Height: 183 cm (6 ft 0 in)
- Weight: 88 kg (13 st 12 lb)

Playing information
- Position: Halfback
Club
Years	Team	Pld	T	G	FG	P
2024–	Wests Tigers	36	5	0	0	20
Representative
Years	Team	Pld	T	G	FG	P
2023–	Tonga	3	0	0	0	0
- Source: As of 16 November 2026
- Relatives: Manase Fainu (brother); Sione Fainu (brother); Samuela Fainu (brother); Tevita Amone (uncle)

Latu Fainu (born 28 May 2005) is a Tonga international rugby league footballer who plays as a halfback for the Wests Tigers in the NRL.

== Background ==
Fainu was born in Guildford, New South Wales. He is of Tongan and Maori descent. His uncle, Tevita Amone, played for the Western Suburbs Magpies and the North Queensland Cowboys.

He attended Patrician Brothers' College, Fairfield as well as Westfields Sports High School and played his junior rugby league for the Guildford Owls.

He has three older brothers, Manase, Sione, and Samuela, who were all signed to the Manly club.

== Early career ==
Fainu played in the Harold Matthews Cup for Manly in 2021 as they went undefeated that season. In July 2023, it was reported that Fainu had signed a four-year deal worth nearly $2 million to join the Wests Tigers ahead of the 2024 NRL season.

== Playing career ==
In November 2023, Fainu made his début for Tonga in the third test of their 2023 tour of England. In round 5 of the 2024 NRL season, Fainu made his first grade debut for the Wests Tigers against the Dolphins. Fainu played nine games for the Wests Tigers throughout the 2024 NRL season as the club finished with the Wooden Spoon for a third consecutive year. Fainu was one of five players that were sanctioned for coming back to November pre-season training out of shape. Fainu played 12 games for the Wests Tigers in the 2026 NRL season as the club finished 15th on the table.
