= Westfields Sports High School =

Location
- 406A Hamilton Road, Fairfield West, Western Sydney, New South Wales; Australia; 33°52′00″S 150°55′12″E

Information
- Type: Government-funded co-educational comprehensive and specialist secondary day school
- Motto: Latin: Fortitudo (Courage and Valour)
- Established: 1963; 63 years ago
- School district: Fairfield; Metropolitan South & West
- Educational authority: New South Wales Department of Education
- Specialist: Sports school
- Principal: Andrew Rogers
- Faculty: ~120
- Teaching staff: 104.5 FTE (2024)
- Years: 7–12
- Enrolment: 1,440 (2024)
- Area: 7 hectares (17 acres)
- Campus type: Suburban
- Colours: Blue and gold
- Newspaper: Westnews
- Affiliation: NSW Sports High Schools Association
- Website: westfields-h.schools.nsw.gov.au

Westfields Sports High School (abbreviated as WSHS) is a government-funded co-educational comprehensive and specialist secondary day school, with speciality in sports, located in Fairfield West, a western suburb of Sydney, New South Wales, Australia.

Established in 1963, the school catered for approximately 1,440 students in 2024, from Year 7 to Year 12, of whom five percent identified as Indigenous Australians and 64 percent were from a language background other than English. The school is operated by the NSW Department of Education; the principal is Andrew Rogers.

Westfields Sports High School is a member of the NSW Sports High Schools Association. The school sits on a total area of approximately seven hectares (seventeen acres).

== History ==
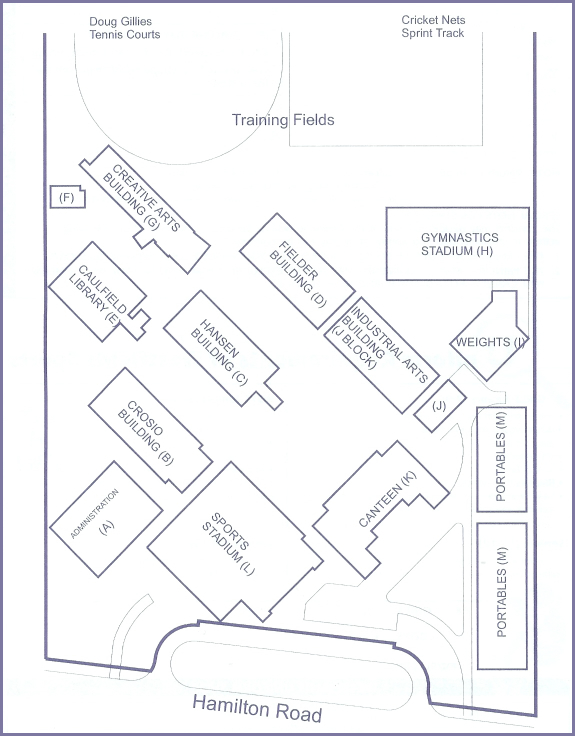
A map of Westfields Sports, outlining the positions of each structure around the campus

The school was established in 1963 and opened by Edward Gough Whitlam, later Australian Prime Minister. The school's first Principal was J. P. Quinlan and its first year enrolment had 300 students. Principal Quinlan had originally wanted the school's motto to be ANZAC, but that was not allowed, so he then chose the Latin: Fortitudo, translated as "courage and valour", that remains the school's motto today. The school originally had four sporting houses: Prospect (team colours black and gold); Kanangra (red); Werriwa (blue) and Lansdowne (green).

In 1964 the new student intake was even larger than the previous year, with close to a thousand new students enrolled. Classes were listed alphabetically from A down to J to include them all. That year also saw a massive fire at the school that affected mainly the science block and the technical arts block, rendering many of the classrooms unusable. Classrooms were temporarily offered at the local primary school, Fairfield West Public School on Hamilton Road, until the burnt out classrooms could be restored. Each day for close to a year, around 100 or so new Year 7 students would attend assembly at Westfields, then march up the hill to classrooms at Fairfield West PS. The cause of the fire was never stated, but it was strongly suspected that the expulsion of several students earlier in the year had led to a grudge arson attack, since the words "N R gang" had been painted in large letters across the girls' and boys' toilet blocks.

From the 1960s to the 1980s the school achieved moderate success in sports and was on the rise during the late 1980s. The then principal, Philip Tucker, had wanted to establish Westfields as a school that could provide any sports person who attended, a pathway to the Australian Institute of Sport, and extend their possibilities beyond high school level sporting competition. The school was eventually officially declared a sports school on 24 April 1991.

Notable teachers who taught at the school in the early years of their careers include the artist Mary Shackman and the international concert pianist Michael Leslie.

Since 1997, there has been an annual student and teacher exchange scheme with Kasukabe High School, from Kasukabe, Saitama, Japan.

In 2008, the International Olympic Committee recognised Westfields Sports for their involvement in producing many Australian Olympians with a special Sport and Youth Trophy. In 2023, it was awarded the Australian Olympic Pathway Schools designation.

== Enrolment policy ==
The school has a partially selective approach to enrolment, with students needing to either live catchment area of the school or demonstrate their ability in sport. The school is very well regarded for having produced sporting talent in a number of different areas of sporting endeavour, and has received a range of grants to support its work with sporting talent.

== Talented sports program ==
Sports offered at Westfields Sports High School include athletics, Australian rules football, baseball, basketball, boxing, cricket, dance, equestrian, golf, gymnastics, hockey, netball, rowing, rugby league, rugby union, soccer, softball, swimming, table tennis, tennis, volleyball, and wrestling.

=== Basketball Team Achievements ===
==== Championship Women (Open) ====
- Australian Schools Championships

(silver) Runners Up: 2023

== Notable alumni ==
- Mustafa Amini – soccer player
- Terry Antonis – soccer player
- Chris Armit – rugby league player
- Nahuel Arrarte – soccer player
- Zeljko Babic – soccer player
- Alexander Badolato – soccer player
- Kate Bates – track and road cyclist
- Patrick Beach – soccer player
- Michael Beauchamp – soccer player
- Lenny Beckett – rugby league player
- Evan Berger – soccer player
- Joel Bertolissio – soccer player
- Tegan Bertolissio – soccer player
- Ricky Betar – Paralympic swimmer
- Nicholas Bilokapic – soccer player
- Leah Blayney – soccer player
- Noah Botic – soccer player
- Leon Bott – rugby league player
- Milly Boughton – soccer player
- Mark Bridge – soccer player
- Lachlan Brook – soccer player
- Alex Brosque – soccer player
- Michael Buettner – rugby league player
- Kerem Bulut – soccer player
- Jacob Burns – soccer player
- Nathan Burns – soccer player
- Anthony Cáceres – soccer player
- Jason Cadee – basketball player
- Catherine Cannuli – soccer player
- Shane Cansdell-Sheriff – soccer player
- David Carney – soccer player
- Ellie Carpenter – soccer player
- Connor Chapman – soccer player
- Margaux Chauvet – soccer player
- Joven Clarke – rugby league player
- Michael Clarke – cricketer
- Jade Close – hockey player
- Kyra Cooney-Cross – soccer player
- Ben Coridas – rugby union player
- Jason Culina – soccer player
- Jesse Curran – soccer player
- Hannah Darlington – cricketer
- Tallyn Da Silva – rugby league player
- Leah de Oliveira – soccer player
- Miloš Degenek – soccer player
- Bill Devenish – swimmer
- Karyne Di Marco – hammer thrower
- Miguel Di Pizio – soccer player
- Matt Doorey – rugby league player
- Indiana dos Santos – soccer player
- Jynaya dos Santos – soccer player
- Jed Drew – soccer player
- Gareth Edds – soccer player
- Shadeene Evans – soccer player
- Latu Fainu – rugby league player
- Manase Fainu – rugby league player
- Samuela Fainu – rugby league player
- Sione Fainu – rugby league player
- Viliami Fifita – rugby league player
- Israel Folau – rugby union, rugby league, and Australian rules football player
- George Francis – rugby union player
- Tony Francis – rugby league player
- Will Freney – soccer player
- Roy Friend – rugby league player
- Liam Fulton – rugby league player
- Jacob Gagan – rugby league player
- Daniela Galić – soccer player
- Sheridan Gallagher – rugby league player
- Lachlan Galvin – rugby league player
- Heather Garriock – soccer player
- Bryce Gibbs – rugby league player
- Kelly Golebiowski – soccer player
- Isabel Gomez – soccer player
- Blake Green – rugby league player
- Michael Greenfield – rugby league player
- Eric Grothe Jr. – rugby league player
- Bradley Groves – soccer player
- Dene Halatau – rugby league player
- Brendan Hamill – soccer player
- Amy Harrison – soccer player
- Jarryd Hayne – rugby league player
- Trent Hodkinson – rugby league player
- Justin Horo – rugby league player
- Isaac Hovar – soccer player
- Angelique Hristodoulou – soccer player
- Alexandra Huynh – soccer player
- Bernie Ibini-Isei – soccer player
- Princess Ibini-Isei – soccer player
- Jamal Idris – rugby league player
- Krisnan Inu – rugby league player
- Luke Ivanovic – soccer player
- Scott Jamieson – soccer player
- Marko Jesic – soccer player
- Matthew Jurman – soccer player
- Billie Kay – professional wrestler
- Aideen Keane – soccer player
- Kris Keating – rugby league player
- Matt Keating – rugby league player
- Simon Keen – cricketer
- Alanna Kennedy – soccer player
- Sean Keppie – rugby league player
- Harry Kewell – soccer player
- Usman Khawaja – cricketer
- David Klemmer – rugby league player
- Tim Lafai – rugby league player
- Fabrice Lapierre – long jumper
- Luke Laulilii – rugby league player
- Kylie Ledbrook – soccer player
- Connelly Lemuelu – rugby league player
- Alessandro Lopane – soccer player
- Issac Luke – rugby league player
- Jared Lum – soccer player
- Sitiveni Mafi – rugby union player
- Mitchell Mallia – soccer player
- Chantelle Maniti – soccer player
- Kristiana Manu'a – netball player
- Feleti Mateo – rugby league player
- Jada Mathyssen-Whyman – soccer player
- Ben Matwijow – rugby union player
- Trent McClenahan – soccer player
- Shannon McDonnell – rugby league player
- Liam McGing – soccer player
- Brent McGrath – soccer player
- Wade McKinnon – rugby league player
- Jamie McMaster – soccer player
- Karl McNichol – rugby league player
- Vesna Milivojevic – soccer player
- Mark Minichiello – rugby league player
- Trey Mooney – rugby league player
- Aaron Mooy – soccer player
- Brodie Mooy – soccer player
- Moudi Najjar – soccer player
- Ramy Najjarine – soccer player
- Heka Nanai – rugby league player
- Isoa Nasilasila – rugby union player
- Caleb Navale – rugby league player
- Courtney Nevin – soccer player
- Yianni Nicolaou – soccer player
- James Nikolovski – soccer player
- Luke O'Donnell – rugby league player
- Wade Oostendorp – soccer player
- Aimee Palmer – soccer player
- Amanda Pascoe – swimmer
- Radovan Pavicevic – soccer player
- Adam Pavlesic – soccer player
- Corey Payne – rugby league player
- Yianni Perkatis – soccer player
- Helen Petinos – soccer player
- Dimitrios Petratos – soccer player
- Susan Phonsongkham – soccer player
- Les Pogliacomi – soccer player
- Rhianna Pollicina – soccer player
- Kristian Popović
- Tiago Quintal – soccer player
- Jamilla Rankin – soccer player
- Kim Ravaillion – netball player
- Taylor Ray – soccer player
- Pat Richards – rugby league player
- Peyton Royce – professional wrestler
- Mathew Ryan – soccer player
- Jason Saab – rugby league player
- Casey Samuels – basketball player
- Sienna Saveska – soccer player
- Courtney Schonell – field hockey player
- Josh Schuster – rugby league player
- Sam Silvera – soccer player
- Amandeep Singh – cricketer
- Harjas Singh – cricketer
- Lindsay Smith – rugby league player
- Jaushua Sotirio – soccer player
- Dani Stevens – discus thrower
- Jeremy Su'a – rugby union player
- Danny Sullivan – rugby union player
- Blaize Talagi – rugby league player
- Tommy Talau – rugby league player
- Ephraim Taukafa – rugby union player
- Ryan Teague – soccer player
- John Thornell – athlete
- Nemanja Tomić – soccer player
- Maria Tran – actress and filmmaker
- Daniel Tranter – swimmer
- Jason Trifiro – soccer player
- Sam Tuivaiti – rugby league player
- Tahlia Tupaea – basketball player
- Stefano Utoikamanu – rugby league player
- Malia Vaka – netball player
- Danny Vukovic – soccer player
- Brandon Wakeham – rugby league player
- Sarah Walsh – soccer player
- James Wesolowski – rugby league player
- Amorette Wild – netball player
- Tony Williams – rugby league player
- Daniel Wilmering – soccer player
- Rhys Youlley – soccer player
- John Paul Young – pop singer
- Louis Zabala – soccer player

== See also ==
- List of government schools in New South Wales: T–Z
- Selective school (New South Wales)
- Education in Australia
