= Scott Geddes =

Australian rugby league footballer

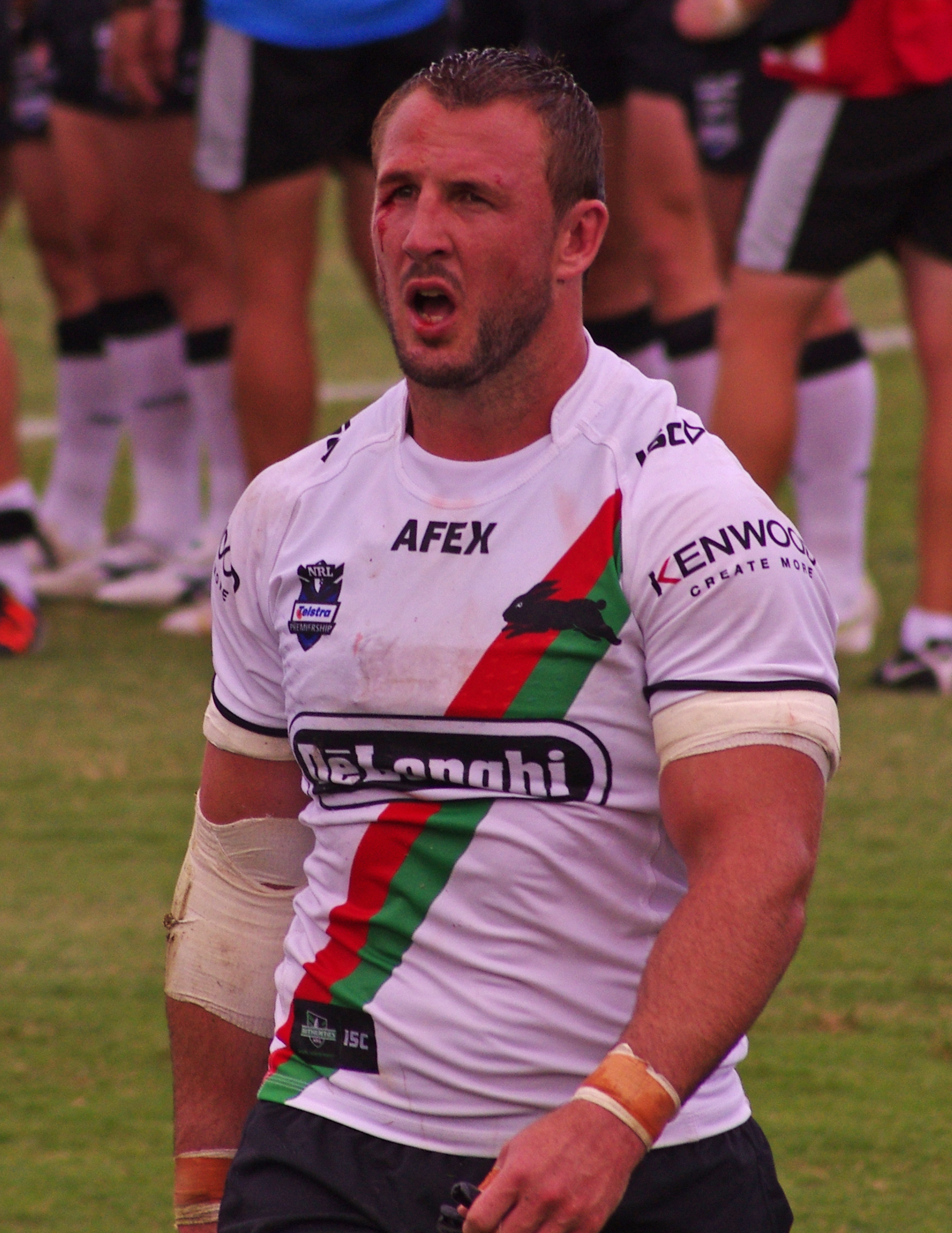

Personal information
- Born: 18 October 1980 (age 46) Bowral, New South Wales, Australia

Playing information
- Height: 188 cm (6 ft 2 in)
- Weight: 108 kg (17 st 0 lb)
- Position: Prop
Club
Years	Team	Pld	T	G	FG	P
2002–12	South Sydney	125	5	0	0	20

Scott Geddes (born 18 October 1980) is an Australian former professional rugby league footballer who played for eleven seasons (2002-2012) as a prop forward for the South Sydney Rabbitohs in the National Rugby League.

== Education ==
Geddes attended Patrician Brothers' College, Fairfield, a renowned rugby league school, for three years (1996 to 1998).

== Football ==
=== South Sydney Rabbitohs ===
Both Geddes and Luke Stuart were the first players to sign with the club when the club was re-instated in the National Rugby League (NRL).

=== Debut ===
Geddes made his first grade debut in round 2 of the 2002 NRL season against the Canberra Raiders.

=== Career ===
Geddes played for Souths during a tough period for the club when they finished last in 2003, 2004, and 2006. In 2007, he made 11 appearances as Souths reached the finals for the first time since 1989.

Geddes was a dominant force on the field. He was a large part of the team's successes in 2009 although the club narrowly missed the finals. He scored the winning try with just 4 seconds to go against the Cronulla-Sutherland Sharks in round 26 2009 at Shark Park.

=== Injuries ===
External videos
- Scott Geddes's Retirement. on YouTube
- Scott Geddes' first first-grade match (against Canberra Raiders, Round 2, 2002). on YouTube
- Scott Geddes Tribute. on YouTube
- Scott Geddes, Interchange, Rabbitohs Team of the Decade. on YouTube
- Scott Geddes in Focus. on YouTube
- Classic Tales with Scott Geddes, at rabbitohs.com.au.

Throughout his career Geddes battled many injuries, limiting his game time, including:

- 2003: ruptured ACL.
- 2010: ruptured ACL: his season ending knee injury in round 13 of 2010 was the first of the many injuries sustained by South Sydney that contributed to the team's poor performance that season.
- 2011: torn Achilles tendon.
- 2012: Ruptured right biceps muscle in a (11 February 2012) pre-season trial against the Warriors: he chose to continue playing, rather than have surgery during the season.

=== Retirement ===
During the 2012 NRL season, Geddes announced that he would retire at the end of the year as a one-club player, and his final first-grade game was in round 16 of the 2012 NRL season (against the Brisbane Broncos at Suncorp Stadium).

== Recognition ==
Geddes received many accolades from the club during his career, including the "Bob McCarthy Clubman of the Year Award" in 2009.

He was made a Life Member of the South Sydney Football Club in 2013.

== After football ==
Specializing in providing personal training and group fitness classes at Maroubra since 2009, he is currently the director and head coach at First Grade Fitness in McKeon Street, Maroubra Beach, where he provides gymnasium facilities, and conducts group and personal training as well as corporate and athletic development programmes.

== See also ==
- List of South Sydney Rabbitohs players
- List of one-club men in rugby league
- List of Patrician Brothers' College, Fairfield Alumni
