= Chris Smith (broadcaster) =

Australian talkback radio broadcaster

Christopher Smith (born 22 July 1962) is an Australian journalist and talkback radio broadcaster. Smith attended Patrician Brothers' College, Fairfield.

== Career ==
Smith has publicly addressed his alcoholism and mental health problems on a number of occasions. In an interview with the Daily Telegraph, stating "I can never go back to that point. I've made some significant changes to my life. I think to a certain degree you have to hit ground zero before you do that." Smith has attempted to justify his behaviour by citing alcoholism and suffering from bipolar disorder.

While working on A Current Affair (ACA) in 1994, Smith was found to have forged the signature of Nine's corporate lawyer, Jane Marquard to have a prisoner released from Silverwater Correctional Complex for an interview. Smith was later charged by police and admitted forging the signature. Smith was suspended for almost a year while the criminal investigation was carried out. He was sentenced to serve two years in prison, suspended for two years. He returned to ACA as a producer, but not before he was exposed and mocked on Media Watch and in the media at large.

Smith went to China where he worked in English language radio and returned to Australia by mid 2005 to present National Nine Early News.

In 2009, Smith was suspended indefinitely from his role at the Macquarie Radio Network, following an incident at a 2GB party where he allegedly groped or made advances on several women at the party, including Network 10 journalist and meteorologist Magdalena Roze, after drinking for "an extended period of time". Smith admitted to misusing anti depressant medication, drinking heavily and claimed to have no recollection of the events. In December 2009 Smith was reinstated and his contract extended, despite a number of female staff voicing concerns surrounding his ongoing conduct.

This was the second time Smith had engaged in sexual misconduct in the workplace, after being fired from his role as producer at Nine Network's A Current Affair for exposing himself to four women at a farewell party in the late 1990s.

In February 2011, Smith ran a competition on his afternoon show called "Smithy's Mystery" which offered listeners movie tickets, books and DVDs if they could correctly guess how many asylum seekers who died at sea would be buried in Sydney. Sponsors reacted angrily, with both BBC Worldwide and publisher Pan Macmillan, which provided the prizes, expressing their shock at the quiz, saying they would never have allowed their brands to be part of it had they been aware. The Australian Communications & Media Authority found the licensee of 2GB, Macquarie Radio Network, had breached the Commercial Radio Code of Practice and Guidelines 2010 requirement that material broadcast must not offend generally accepted standards of decency, stating "offensive, in very bad taste, and that it should not have been broadcast".

In December 2022, Smith was suspended from Sky News Australia after accusations that he behaved inappropriately toward colleagues after the broadcaster’s Christmas party. His employment at Sky News and 2GB was subsequently terminated.

In January 2025, he was to replace John Laws on 2SM mornings.
