= Mick Pattison =

Australian rugby league footballer

Personal information
- Full name: Michael Pattison
- Born: 11 December 1958 (age 66); Parramatta, New South Wales, Australia

Playing information
- Position: Five-eighth, Lock
Club
Years	Team	Pld	T	G	FG	P
1978–80	Parramatta Eels	47	14	0	0	42
1981–82	South Sydney	32	8	0	0	32
1983–84	Parramatta Eels	7	2	0	0	8
1985–86	Illawarra Steelers	43	4	0	0	16
	Total	129	28	0	0	98
Representative
Years	Team	Pld	T	G	FG	P
1982	NSW City	1	0	0	0	0
- Source: As of 3 February 2023

Mick Pattison (born 11 December 1958) is an Australian former professional rugby league footballer who played in the 1970s and 1980s. He played for Parramatta, South Sydney and Illawarra in the NSWRL competition.

== Playing career ==
Pattison was a Parramatta junior and had been awarded the club's 1977 rookie of the year award before making his first grade debut with the side in round 4 of the 1978 NSWRFL season against Balmain at Leichhardt Oval. In 1979, Pattison had a consistent season playing 22 games including the clubs major preliminary semi-final victory over Cronulla-Sutherland. He moved to Souths in 1981 and was chosen in the New South Wales State of Origin team but had to withdraw with an inner-ear infection on the morning of the match. In the same season, Pattison played in South Sydney's 1981 Tooth Cup final victory over Cronulla. Pattison capped off a successful season with Souths winning the 1981 Dally M Five-Eighth of the year award.

The following year he made the NSW City team and looked set to win a place in the New South Wales side when he broke both collarbones in a freak tackle. In 1983, he returned to Parramatta but injuries meant he could only make seven appearances over two years. Pattison would later join Illawarra and was their player of the year in 1985. Pattison retired at the end of 1986 due to a chronic back injury.
