= Remo Nogarotto =

Australian soccer executive

Board member of Football Federation Australia
- Incumbent
- Assumed office November 2018

Chairman of Soccer Australia
- In office December 2002 – May 2003

Personal details
- Born: Annandale, New South Wales, Australia
- Party: Australian Labor Party (?–1986); Liberal Party of Australia (1988–)
- Education: University of Sydney

Remo Nogarotto is an Australian businessman and soccer executive. Nogarotto is Executive Chairman for Corporate Advisory for the C|T Group (formerly Crosby Textor Group) and is a board member of Football Federation Australia.

== Early life and education ==
Nogarotto was born in the Sydney suburb of Annandale to Anita (née Toppano) and Celso Nogarotto. His parents had both immigrated from Italy; his father from village near Venice and his mother from Udine. When his mother died when he was 13, his father briefly moved his family to Italy. After returning to Australia, Nogarotto attended high school at the Patrician Brothers' College, Fairfield. Nogarotto graduated from the University of Sydney after studying economics and industrial law.

== Political and working career ==
In 1983 Nogarotto was an unsuccessful Australian Labor Party (ALP) candidate for the Smithfield ward of the Fairfield Council.

After graduating from university he worked in industrial relations before focusing on policy. In 1985 he was appointed chief executive office of the New South Wales Housing Industry Association at the age of 25, a role he would hold for 13 years.

When Bronwyn Bishop switched from the Senate to the House of Representatives in 1994, Nogarotto was suggested as a Liberal Party replacement by former New South Wales premier Nick Greiner. The Sydney Morning Herald suggested that his Labor Party background may have been an impediment to gaining preselection.

In 1997, Nogarotto joined Boral Group as a general manager for business development.

Nogarotto replaced Tony Nutt as New South Wales state director of the Liberal Party in January 1998.

In the wake of the Liberal Party loss in the 1999 New South Wales state election, senior Liberal figures such as Jeff Kennett called for Nogarotto's sacking. Former leader Peter Collins described the campaign as "the most incompetent election campaign that the Liberal Party has run in living memory" and suggested Nogarotto should take responsibility. Nogarotto ultimately resigned in January 2000.

== Soccer ==
Nogarotto was elected to the board of Club Marconi in 1983 and served as chairman of the Marconi Stallions from 1988 to 1993.

Between 1989 and 1993, Nogarotto was a director of the New South Wales Soccer Federation.

In 1998, Nogarotto became chairman of National Soccer League (NSL) expansion team Northern Spirit.

After the departure of David Hill as Soccer Australia chairman in 1998, Nogarotto backed Nick Greiner as replacement.

In February 2000, the Australian Professional Footballers Association sued Northern Spirit alleging that Nogarotto had sacked two players, Robert Enes and Anthony Perinich, because of their membership of the association.

In May 2000, Nogarotto announced the sale of a controlling 51 percent of the Northern Spirit to Scottish club Rangers F.C.

After the founding of Newcastle United in 2000, Nogarotto served as a consultant to club owner Con Constantine, moving to a full-time role in 2001.

Nogarotto was elected chairman of Soccer Australia in December 2002, the fifth man to hold the position in seven years. He and most of his board resigned in April 2003 to make way for a new regime led by Frank Lowy.

In November 2018 was elected to the board of Football Federation Australia (FFA), a successor organisation to Soccer Australia.
