= ALAND =

Australian property development company

- Type: Private
- Industry: Property Development
- Founded: 2002
- Founder: Andrew Hrsto
- Headquarters: Strathfield, New South Wales, Australia
- Area served: Sydney & Central Coast (NSW)

ALAND is a privately owned Australian property development and construction company. ALAND builds residential developments in Western Sydney, with projects in Liverpool, Merrylands, Schofields, Harris Park and St Marys.

== History ==
ALAND was established in 2002 by Andrew Hrsto. ALAND initially built apartment blocks in Sydney’s western suburbs and north shore regions.

The company unveiled Paramount on Parkes, a development in Harris Park, adjacent to Sydney’s second-largest commercial district. Designed by SJB Architects the 46-storey tower, which contains 331 apartments and six floors of commercial space, was named Best Mixed-Use Development Australia at the 2023 Asia Pacific International Property Awards. ALAND has been a sponsor of the Parramatta Eels Rugby League team since 2018. ALAND also provides scholarships each year for students at TAFE NSW.

In 2022 the company acquired a building site in the city of Gosford, on the NSW Central Coast, and commissioned designs for a mixed-use development that combines residential apartments, restaurants and bars, a ground floor pub and a 130-room Voco® hotel. Construction on the $375 million project began in the first quarter of 2023 and is expected to be completed in early 2025. Archibald by ALAND is named after Archibald Acheson, 2nd Earl of Gosford. Voco Gosford is the hotel brand’s second property in regional NSW and will join parent company IHG’s global network of hotels and resorts.

On 19 December 2025 Aland B & W Pty Ltd, the licensed building company within the Aland group was fined $25,000.00 by the Building Commission NSW under section 56(c) Home Building Act 1989.

On 28 April 2026, Building Commission NSW placed the following conditions on the contractor licence of Aland B & W Pty Ltd:

Under section 62(1)(d) of the HB Act, vary the Contractor Licence by imposing on the Contractor Licence the following conditions for a period of three (3) years from the date of this decision:

1) The Authority Holder must within two (2) months of the date of these conditions, engage a suitably qualified independent person (and who has not been an officer or employee of the Authority Holder or its related entities within the previous 3 years) to:

(a) conduct a root cause analysis of the governance, supervision and quality assurance issues that contributed to the conduct subject of grounds of this decision; and (b) prepare a written report within four (4) months of the date of these conditions identifying recommendations to the Authority Holder concerning governance, supervision and quality assurance improvements it can implement to reduce the risk of future similar non-compliance.

2) Within six (6) months of the date of these conditions, the directors and nominated supervisors of the Authority Holder are required to consider the report described in 1)b) and record the Authority Holder’s response to the recommendations.

3) The Authority Holder must, within seven (7) months of the date of imposition of these conditions, to the extent not already in place, develop, implement, and continue to implement, a documented compliance management system which: (a) identifies the Authority Holder’s legislative obligations as the holder of the Authority; (b) implements appropriate mechanisms to ensure the Authority Holder complies with its legislative obligations as the holder of the Authority; and (c) is monitored and is regularly reviewed.

4) The Authority Holder must within eighteen (18) months of imposition of these conditions, engage a suitably qualified independent person to audit compliance with condition 1), 2) and 3) and produce a report to the Authority Holder concerning the following:

(a) whether the design of the documented compliance management system that has been implemented is sufficient to ensure the Authority Holder’s operations will comply with its legislative obligations the holder of the Authority; (b) whether the documented compliance management system is being implemented in practice by the Authority Holder; and (c) whether there are best practice improvements that can be made to the Authority Holder’s documented compliance management system and a description of those improvements.

6) The Authority Holder must within six (6) months of the date of imposition of these conditions, and thereafter on a regular basis, require persons engaged in the following roles: Senior Project Managers, Project Managers, Project Coordinators, and General Manager (Construction), to complete and pass targeted compliance training provided by a suitably qualified provider (which for the avoidance of doubt, may also be training conducted by a law firm) relating to: (a) contractor licensing requirements; (b) legislative obligations of the Authority Holder as the holder of the Authority; (c) tender and procurement compliance controls; and (d) escalation of potential non-compliance with legislative obligations of the Authority Holder as the holder of the authority.

7) The Authority Holder must within thirty (30) days of the date of imposition of these conditions, provide a report to the Secretary (by transmission method described in the cover letter to this decision) detailing the steps the Authority Holder proposes to take to provide a remedy to Endeavour Energy in respect of the required Rectification Works to which the grounds of this reasons for this decision relates.

8) The Authority Holder must store and retain business records of how it complies with the conditions 1) to 7) above and provide those records to the Secretary, on request, within fourteen (14) days.

== Notable projects ==
- Paramount on Parkes
- The Gladstone Village
- Schofield Gardens
- Archibald by ALAND
- Carson on the Park
- Costello
- The Emerald
