= Dietrich Roache =

Australian rugby sevens player

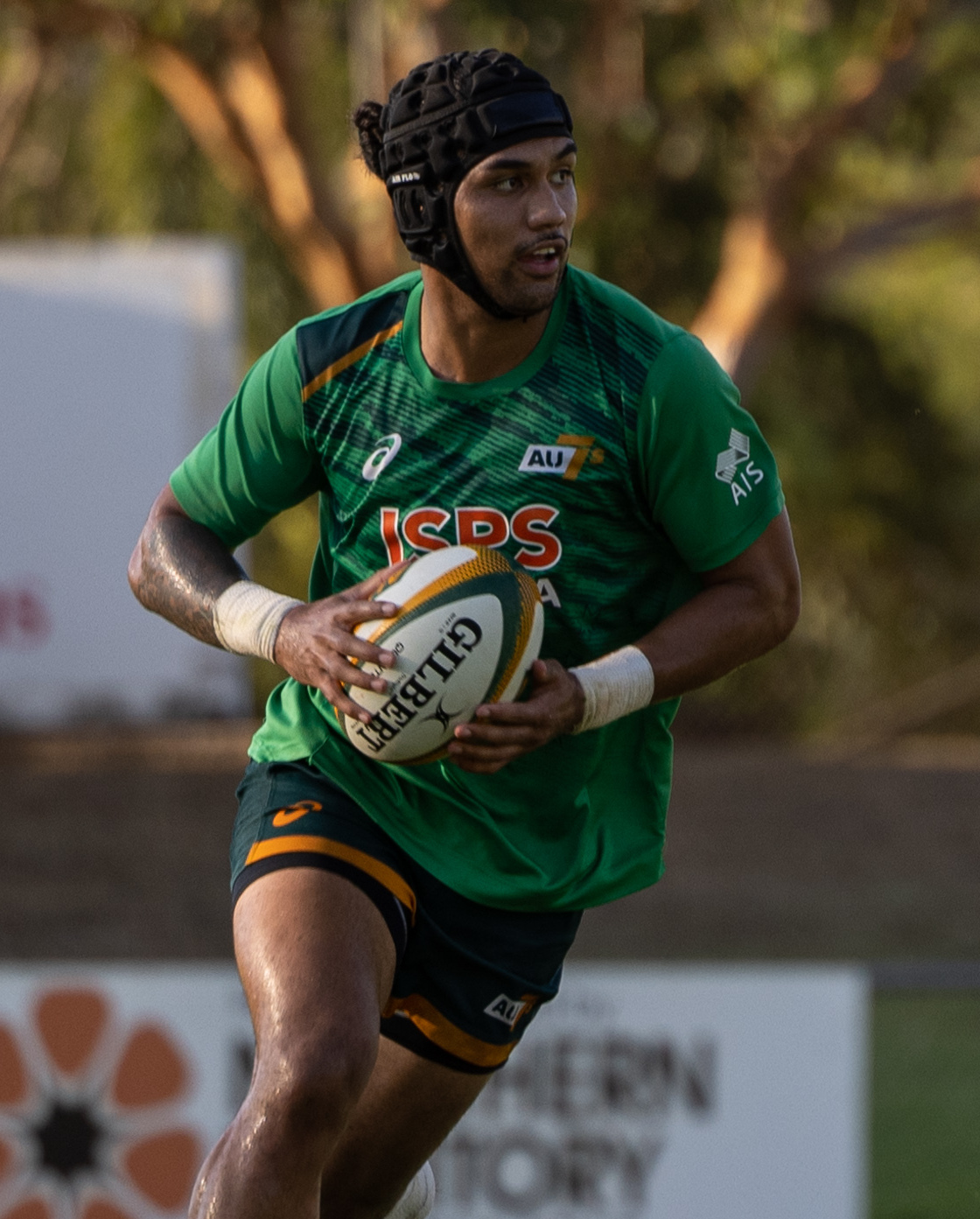
- Roache with the Australia Sevens team in 2024
- Full name: Dietrich Peter Roache
- Born: 6 July 2001 (age 25) Sydney, New South Wales, Australia
- Height: 1.82 m (6 ft 0 in)
- Weight: 92 kg (203 lb)
- School: Patrician Brothers' College

Rugby union career
- Position: Wing
- Current team: Western Sydney
Senior career
Years	Team	Apps	(Points)
2023–	Western Sydney	2	(0)
- Correct as of 1 December 2023
National sevens team
Years	Team		Comps
2021–	Australia		24
- Correct as of 1 December 2023

Dietrich Peter Roache (born 6 July 2001) is an Australian professional rugby union player who plays as a wing for Shute Shield club Western Sydney Two Blues and the Australia national sevens team.

== Early life ==
Born of Samoan descent from his father, Roache initially played rugby league for his school, Patrician Brothers' College, Fairfield. While there, he was a part of the Patrician Brothers rugby league team that won the NRL Schoolboy Cup. In 2017, he played for the St George Dragons in the Harold Matthews Cup. Roache is a Roman Catholic.

== Rugby sevens career ==
Though his father and uncle played rugby for the former Parramatta Two Blues, Roache did not start playing club rugby until 2018. This came after getting a free ticket to the Sydney Sevens in 2018. He gained a reputation as a fast player, being able to run a time of 4.59 seconds over 40 metres. This matched the time of Trae Williams who missed selection for the Australian Olympic team for the 2020 Olympic Games as a result. He was selected for the New South Wales Waratahs' Junior under-18 team and part of their development programme. In 2019, he played for Australia at the World Rugby School Sevens and a year later was signed by Rugby Australia to their sevens programme.

In 2021, when he was selected for the Australia national rugby sevens team for their 2020 Olympics rugby sevens tournament, he was the youngest member of the team and was given responsibility for taking care of the team's mascot Wally. This followed on from Henry Hutchison at the 2016 Summer Olympics where Wally was kidnapped by players from the Sweden women's national football team for 24 hours.

Roache competed for Australia at the 2022 Rugby World Cup Sevens in Cape Town. In 2024, He was named in the Australian sevens team for the Summer Olympics in Paris.

== Rugby league career ==
In July 2026, the Sydney Roosters rugby league club announced the signing of Roache until the end of the 2027 season.
