= Bernard Zuel =

Australian music journalist

- Born: Andre Bernard Zuel; 1965 (age 60–61); Beau Bassin-Rose Hill, Mauritius
- Occupation: Music journalist
- Writing career
- Language: English

Bernard Zuel (born 1965) is an Australian music journalist. Zuel wrote for Fairfax Media newspapers The Age and The Sydney Morning Herald from 1992 to 2017. He became their senior music writer and reviewer. Zuel is a judge of the Australian Music Prize award. At the end of June 2017 he left Fairfax Media to become a freelance journalist and also taught music journalism.

== Early life and education ==
Bernard Zuel was born in 1965 Rose Hill, Mauritius. In the late 1960s, with his family – father Cyril, mother Irlande and two younger siblings – he relocated to Australia and settled in Sydney. Bernard attended Patrician Brothers' College, Fairfield.

In the podcast Penmanship (2016), Zuel told Andrew McMillen how he wrote his first review when he was 20 years old on R.E.M.'s Fables of the Reconstruction (1985), which he submitted to street press. He was surprised to find it was published and worked for street press before he got a job as a general news reporter at The Penrith Press. He worked there for a few years before starting at The Sydney Morning Herald in 1992, where he became the senior music writer and reviewer.

Zuel regularly talks music on ABC local radio and appears on The Right Note. After 25 years at The Sydney Morning Herald, he left in June 2017 to become a freelance journalist at his website and to teach music journalism.
