= Tevita Amone =

Tongan rugby league footballer

Personal information
- Born: 8 July 1980 (age 45) Tonga
- Height: 188 cm (6 ft 2 in)
- Weight: 107 kg (16 st 12 lb)

Playing information
- Position: Prop
Club
Years	Team	Pld	T	G	FG	P
1999	Western Suburbs	8	0	0	0	0
2002	North Qld Cowboys	3	0	0	0	0
	Total	11	0	0	0	0
- Source: As of 3 November 2018
- Relatives: Sione Fainu (nephew); Latu Fainu (nephew); Samuela Fainu (nephew); Manase Fainu (nephew); Tom Amone (nephew); Siosifa Amone (nephew)

Tevita Amone (born 8 July 1980) is a Tongan former professional rugby league footballer who played for the Western Suburbs Magpies and the North Queensland Cowboys in the National Rugby League, primarily as a prop.

== Playing career ==
Born in Tonga, Amone represented New South Wales under-17 in 1997 while playing for the Western Suburbs Magpies SG Ball Cup side. In 1999, he represented the Junior Kiwis.

In Round 3 of the 1999 NRL season, he made his NRL debut as an 18-year-old in the Magpies' 6–60 defeat to the Penrith Panthers. In the Magpies' final ever season, he played eight games for the club, starting at prop in their 20–18 Round 7 victory over the South Sydney Rabbitohs.

In 2000, he played for the Magpies' First Division side, spending two and a half seasons with the team.

In June 2002, Amone was signed by the North Queensland Cowboys, playing three games for them during the 2002 NRL season. He was released by the club at the end of the season.

== Personal life ==
Amone's nephew, Manase Fainu, has played for the Manly Warringah Sea Eagles.
