= Manase Fainu =

Tonga international rugby league footballer

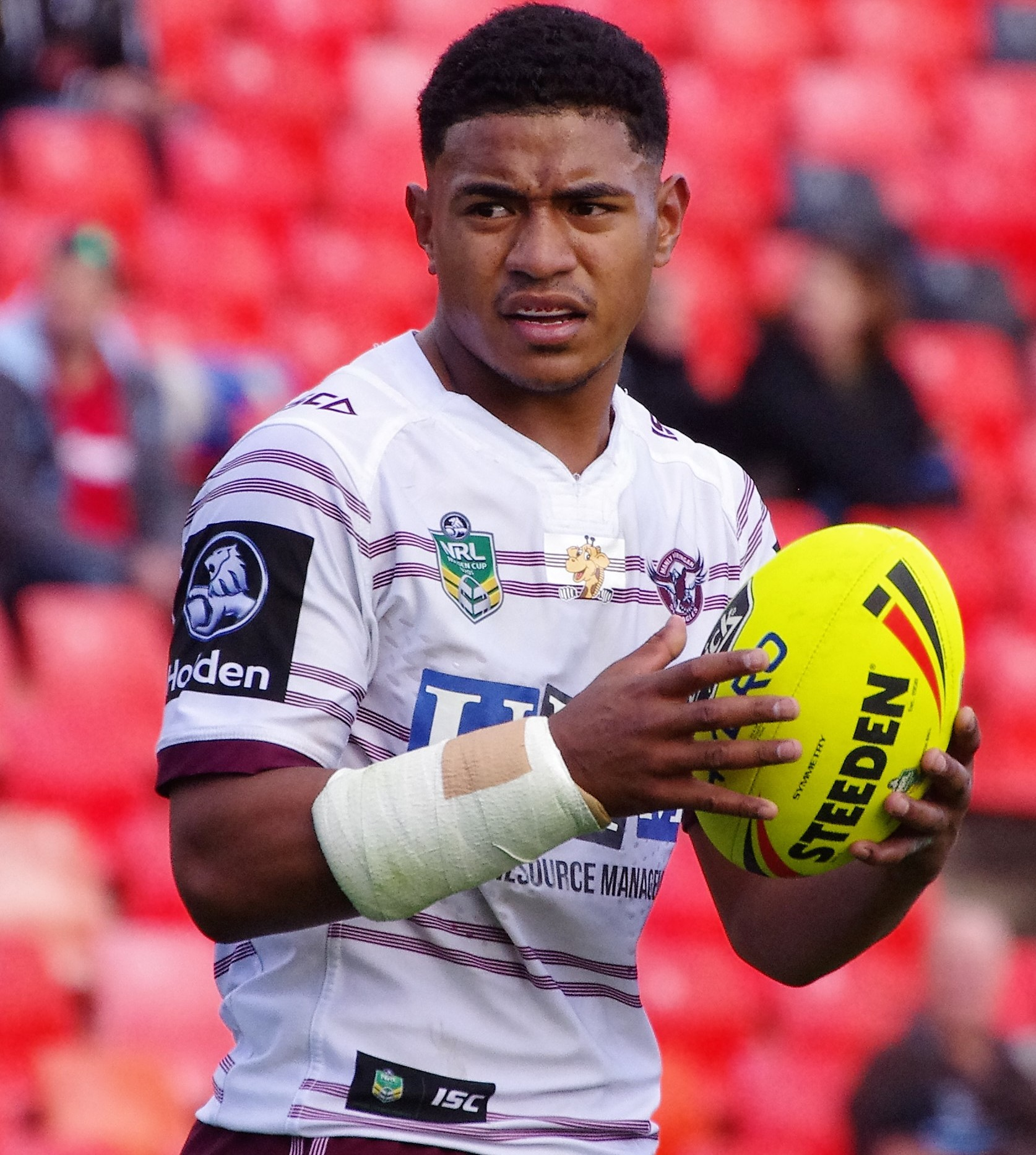

Personal information
- Full name: Manase Fainu
- Born: 17 July 1998 (age 28) Westmead, New South Wales, Australia
- Height: 185 cm (6 ft 1 in)
- Weight: 95 kg (14 st 13 lb)

Playing information
- Position: Hooker
Club
Years	Team	Pld	T	G	FG	P
2018–19	Manly Sea Eagles	34	8	0	0	32
Representative
Years	Team	Pld	T	G	FG	P
2019	Tonga	1	0	0	0	0
- Source: As of 24 September 2019
- Education: Patrician Brothers' College, Fairfield; Westfields Sports High School
- Relatives: Sione Fainu (brother); Latu Fainu (brother); Samuela Fainu (brother); Tevita Amone (uncle) Tom Amone (cousin); Siosifa Amone (cousin)

Manase Fainu (born 17 October 1998) is a Tongan former international rugby league footballer who played as a hooker for the Manly Warringah Sea Eagles in the NRL before he was convicted of a violent crime and sentenced to eight years in prison.

== Background ==
Fainu was born in Sydney, New South Wales, Australia. He is of Māori descent on his mother's side and Tongan descent his father's side. His uncle, Tevita Amone, played for the Western Suburbs Magpies and the North Queensland Cowboys.

He attended Patrician Brothers' College, Fairfield as well as Westfields Sports High School and played his junior rugby league for the Guildford Owls.

He has three younger brothers, Sione, Samuela, and Latu.

== Playing career ==
Fainu made his NRL debut in round 16 of the 2018 NRL season for Manly Warringah against the Penrith Panthers. Fainu then signed with the Manly-Warringah Sea Eagles for a further two years extending his contract until the end of 2020. Fainu made a total of 25 appearances for Manly in the 2019 NRL season as the club finished 6th on the table and qualified for the finals. Fainu played in both of Manly's finals games against Cronulla-Sutherland and South Sydney in which the club was eliminated in the second week by Souths. His excellent form in 2019 and a great combination formed with Tom Trbojevic saw Manly let Apisai Koroisau go to the Panthers only to have Fainu stood down in the NRL's no Fault stand down policy for stabbing a man outside a church.

== Criminal conviction ==
In July 2018, Fainu was charged with filming a sex act without consent. Fainu pleaded guilty to the incident in September 2018 but avoided conviction.

On 29 October 2019, Fainu was charged by police for stabbing a man with a 10 cm knife at a church dance. It was alleged that Fainu produced the knife and stabbed the man after a confrontation. Fainu presented himself to NSW police at Liverpool following the incident and was charged with intent to cause grievous bodily harm, affray and recklessly cause grievous bodily harm in company.

On 16 December 2019, Fainu's case was adjourned until 3 February 2020 after he failed to attend court due to an ongoing shoulder injury. Justice Stephen Rothman granted the order under the conditions that Fainu surrendered his passport, reported to police daily, provided a $10,000 surety and would remain at home.

On 11 August 2022, a jury found Fainu guilty of wounding with intent to cause grievous bodily harm. On 2 December 2022, he was sentenced to eight years in prison with a non-parole period of four years and three months.

=== Appeal and parole eligibility ===
On 6 October 2023, the New South Wales Court of Criminal Appeal dismissed Fainu’s conviction appeal, rejecting arguments that the jury’s verdict was unreasonable. Contemporary reporting of the December 2022 sentence noted a non-parole period of four years and three months, making him first eligible for parole in late October 2026.
