= Nathan Brown (rugby league, born 1993) =

Italy international rugby league footballer

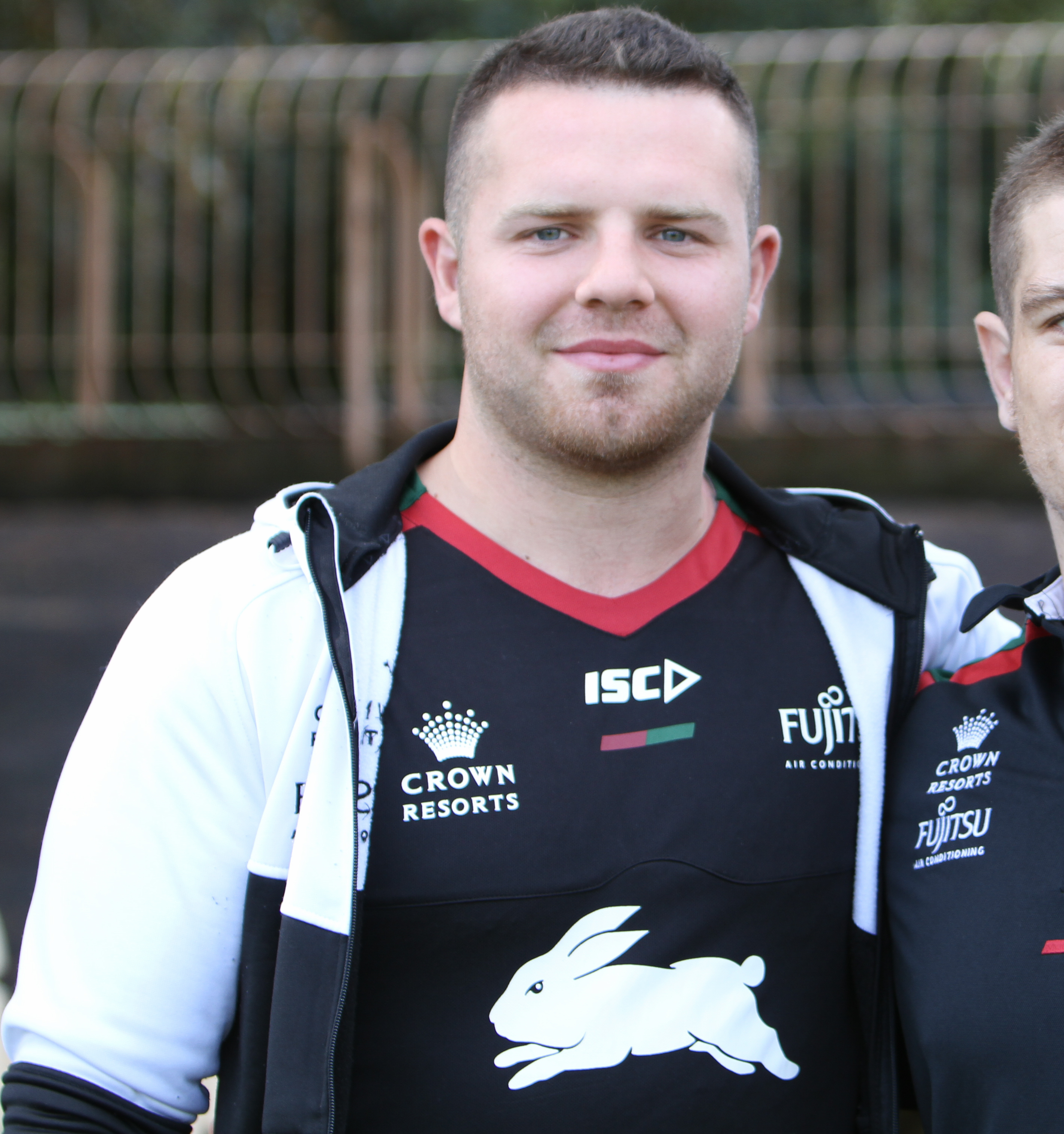

Personal information
- Born: 1 March 1993 (age 33) Fairfield, New South Wales, Australia
- Height: 185 cm (6 ft 1 in)
- Weight: 104 kg (16 st 5 lb)

Playing information
- Position: Lock
Club
Years	Team	Pld	T	G	FG	P
2013	Wests Tigers	1	0	0	0	0
2015–16	South Sydney	28	1	0	0	4
2017–22	Parramatta Eels	109	6	0	0	24
2023	Sydney Roosters	10	0	0	0	0
2024–26	Manly Sea Eagles	53	1	0	0	4
2027–	Catalans Dragons	0	0	0	0	0
	Total	201	8	0	0	32
Representative
Years	Team	Pld	T	G	FG	P
2016	NSW City	1	0	0	0	0
2017–22	Italy	6	0	0	0	0
2019	Prime Minister's XIII	1	0	0	0	0
2019	Australia 9s	2	2	0	0	10
2020	New South Wales	2	0	0	0	0
- Source: As of 22 November 2026

Nathan Brown (born 1 March 1993) is an Italian international rugby league footballer who plays as a lock for the Catalans Dragons in the Super League.

He previously played for the Wests Tigers, South Sydney Rabbitohs, Parramatta Eels and the Sydney Roosters in the NRL, and NSW City and the Prime Minister's XIII at representative level.

== Background ==
Brown was born in Fairfield, New South Wales, Australia. He is of Italian ancestry on his mother's side. Brown attended well renowned rugby league school Patrician Brothers' College, Fairfield where he won MCS and state titles

He was a representative junior cricketer. He played his junior football for Farfield United, Cabramatta Two Blues, Five Dock RSL and Dundas Shamrocks, before being signed by the Wests Tigers.

== Playing career ==
=== Early career ===
In 2012 and 2013, Brown played for the Wests Tigers' NYC team. On 30 September 2012, he played in the Tigers' 2012 NYC Grand Final win over the Canberra Raiders. On 18 July 2013, he re-signed with the Tigers on a 3-year contract.

=== 2013 ===
In Round 24 of the 2013 NRL season, Brown made his NRL debut for the Wests Tigers against St. George Illawarra. As Wests Tigers had exceeded their second-tier salary cap, the NRL had to grant a special dispensation for Brown to play as neither team could reach the semi-finals. However, Brown was precluded from playing in any further games for the season.

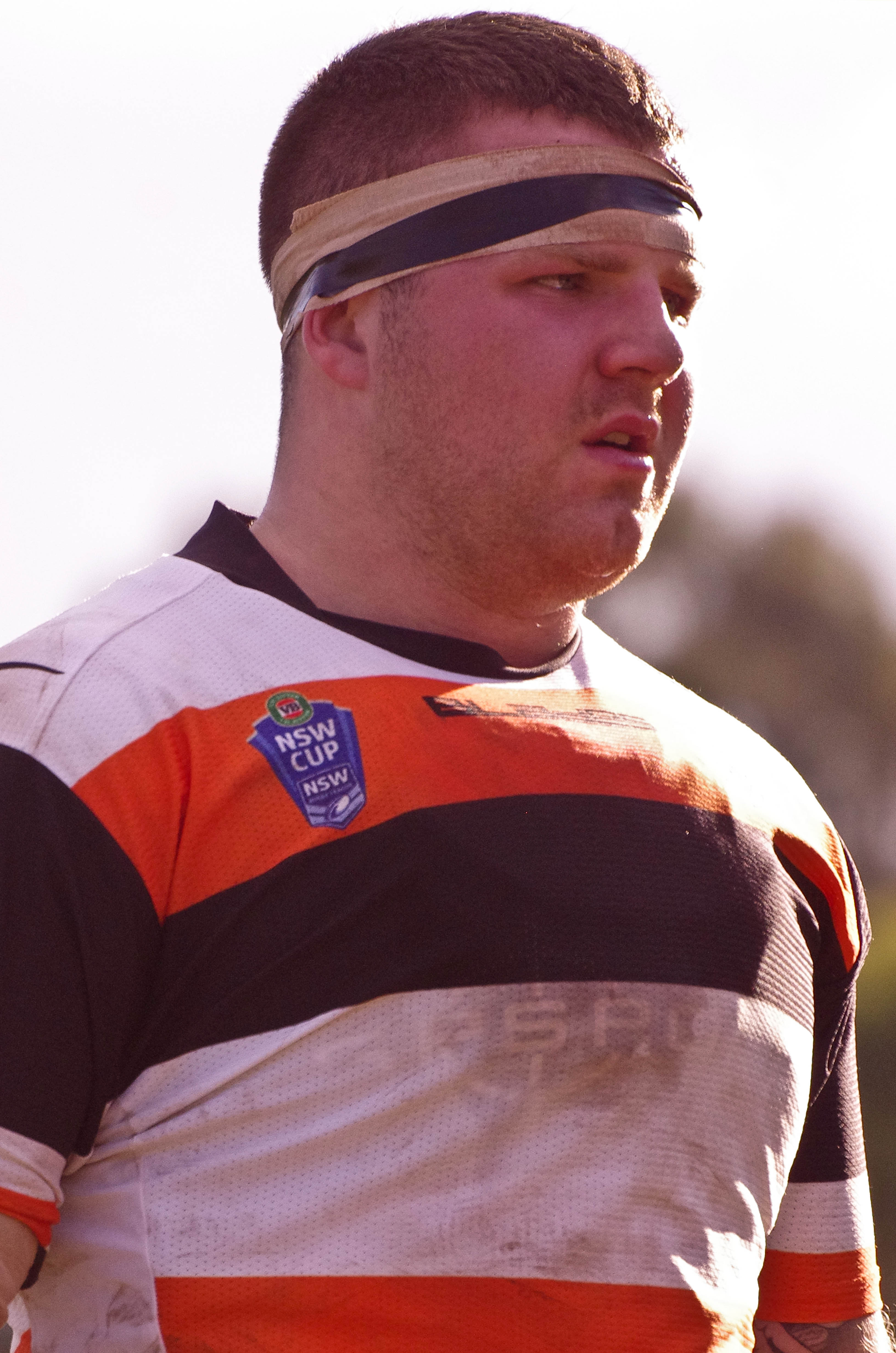
Brown playing for the Tigers

=== 2015 ===
On 2 March, Brown signed a 2-year contract with South Sydney effective immediately, after being released from his Wests contract. He made his South Sydney debut in round 6 of the 2015 NRL season against North Queensland. He finished off the year with seven games for Souths, starting in the second-row on two occasions.

=== 2016 ===
Brown was a regular in first grade in 2016, playing prop or lock. In round 13 he avoided suspension after attempting to kick a player in the groin. The next week, he was described as, "one of rugby league’s dirtiest players, biggest thug and throwback to the old days," after a late shot on Mitchell Moses. Coach Michael Maguire said, "Seriously I think he’s a good kid but he’s playing on the edge when fatigue sets in. He’s got to be more aware of those moments in the game." In September, Brown signed a 2-year contract with the Parramatta Eels starting in 2017.

=== 2017 ===
After a stellar first season with Parramatta, Brown was awarded the Ken Thornett Medal for being Parramatta's best player in 2017. Brown was named in the Italy training squad for the 2017 Rugby League World Cup. Brown played in all three of Italy's pool matches at the World Cup including the 46–0 demolition of the United States.

=== 2018 ===
On 6 March 2018, Brown signed a new contract to stay at Parramatta until the end of the 2020 NRL season. In Round 5 against Penrith, Brown suffered an ankle injury in the 12–6 loss and was ruled out indefinitely. On 2 June 2018, Brown made his long-awaited return from injury in Parramatta's 30–4 defeat by Newcastle. Brown made a total of 15 appearances for Parramatta as the club endured a horrid season finishing last on the table and claimed its 14th wooden spoon.

=== 2019 ===
In round 1 2019 against the Penrith Panthers, Brown was taken from the field during the first half after damaging his left pectoral muscle. It was later revealed that Brown would be ruled out for 3 months.

Brown made his return to the Parramatta side against Cronulla-Sutherland in Round 13 which ended in a 42–22 loss at Shark Park. In Round 23 against arch rivals Canterbury-Bankstown, Brown was placed on report and sent to sin bin after hitting Canterbury player Dallin Watene-Zelezniak with an illegal shoulder charge. Parramatta would go on to lose the match 12–6 in a shock loss at the new Western Sydney Stadium. with Brown receiving a two match suspension. On 7 October, he was named in the Australian side for the 2019 Rugby League World Cup 9s.

=== 2020 ===
On 13 May, Brown signed a contract extension with Parramatta, keeping him at the club until the end of the 2021 season.

Brown scored his first try of the year for Parramatta in the 2020 qualifying final against Melbourne at Suncorp Stadium where Parramatta lost 36–24.

Brown was selected for Game 2 and Game 3 of the 2020 State of Origin series for New South Wales. The Blues would suffer a shock 2–1 series defeat against Queensland.

=== 2021 ===
In round 19 of the 2021 NRL season, Brown provided one of the bombed tries of the year. With the score in Canberra's favour 12–6, Parramatta put up a bomb which was caught by Jakob Arthur, he then passed it to Brown who dropped the ball unmarked right near the try line. Parramatta would go on to lose the game 12–10.

Brown made a total of 24 appearances for Parramatta in the 2021 NRL season and played in both finals matches for the club as they were once again knocked out in the second week for a third straight season.

=== 2022 ===
On 16 June, Brown was demoted to reserve grade by the Parramatta club and given permission to negotiate with other clubs. Brown had 18 months remaining on his contract but he was informed by Parramatta that he was not part of their future plans. After being left out of the Parramatta side for almost three months, Brown was named on the interchange bench for Parramatta in the 2022 NRL Grand Final against Penrith. Brown only played 26 minutes in the 2022 NRL Grand Final as Parramatta were defeated 28–12 against Penrith.

=== 2023 ===
On 14 March, Brown was granted an immediate release to join the Sydney Roosters for the remainder of the 2023 NRL season. In round 12 of the 2023 NRL season, Brown made his club debut for the Sydney Roosters in their 24–22 loss against St. George Illawarra. In round 23, Brown was sent off for a high tackle during the clubs 26–16 victory over Manly. In the Sydney Roosters round 25 NSW Cup game against Parramatta, Brown was sin binned twice during the match as the club lost 22–12. On 21 September, it was announced that Brown would not be offered a new contract with the Sydney Roosters and would be released. In November, Brown signed a one-year deal to join Manly ahead of the 2024 NRL season.

=== 2024 ===
In June, Brown signed a two-year contract extension to remain at Manly until the end of 2026. Brown played 22 games for Manly in the 2024 NRL season as they finished 7th on the table and qualified for the finals. Manly would be eliminated in the second week of the finals by the Sydney Roosters.

=== 2025 ===
On 1 July, it was announced that Brown would be ruled out for an indefinite period with a ruptured biceps injury. Brown played 12 games for Manly in the 2025 NRL season as the club finished 10th on the table.

=== 2026 ===
On 28 August, Brown celebrated his 200th first grade game. Brown played 19 games for Manly in the 2026 NRL season as the club missed out on the finals. In September it was announced that Brown had been released by the Manly club.

On 7 October 2026 it was reported that he had signed for Catalans Dragons in the Super League

== Personal life ==
Brown is married to Nadine Brown; the couple has three sons together.

== Statistics ==
Year	Team	Games	Tries	Pts
2013	Wests Tigers	1		
2015	South Sydney Rabbitohs	7		
2016	South Sydney Rabbitohs	21	1	4
2017	Parramatta Eels	25	1	4
2018	Parramatta Eels	15	1	4
2019	Parramatta Eels	13	1	4
2020	Parramatta Eels	18	1	4
2021	Parramatta Eels	24	1	4
2022	Parramatta Eels	14	1	4
2023	Sydney Roosters	10		
2024	Manly Warringah Sea Eagles	22		
2025	Manly Warringah Sea Eagles	12	1	4
2026	Manly Warringah Sea Eagles	9		
2027	Catalans Dragons			
	Totals	191	7	28
