= Garen Casey =

Australian rugby league footballer

Personal information
- Full name: Garen Casey
- Born: 25 June 1974 (age 52)

Playing information
- Position: Centre, Five-eighth, Halfback, Lock
Club
Years	Team	Pld	T	G	FG	P
1994	Parramatta Eels	8	5	0	0	20
1996–97	Penrith Panthers	23	7	4	0	36
1998	Wakefield Trinity	32	17	115	4	302
1999	Salford City Reds	18	3	23	0	58
	Total	81	32	142	4	416

Garen Casey is an Australian former professional rugby league footballer who played in the 1990s. He was the Australian Schoolboys Captain in 1992 touring New Zealand. Following a successful high school career at Patrician Bros College, Fairfield, he played at club level for Parramatta Eels, Penrith Panthers, Wakefield Trinity, and Salford City Reds, as a centre, five-eighth, halfback, or lock.

== Career ==
Casey played stand-off and scored a try and two goals in Wakefield Trinity’s 24-22 victory over the Featherstone Rovers in the 1998 First Division Grand Final at McAlpine Stadium, Huddersfield on Saturday 26 September 1998.

Casey attended Patrician Brothers' College, Fairfield, and starred at 5/8 against Harristown State High(Qld) in the 1992 Commonwealth Bank Cup Grand Final.

Casey started the USA Women's Rugby League Inc who were the first official organization to represent the USA for Women's Rugby League.
