= Steven Jolly =

Australian rugby league footballer and administrator

Personal information
- Full name: Steven Jolly

Playing information
- Position: Halfback
Club
Years	Team	Pld	T	G	FG	P
1996	Parramatta Eels	1	0	0	0	0
1997	Balmain Tigers	11	1	0	0	4
	Total	12	1	0	0	4

Steven Jolly is an Australian former professional rugby league footballer who played in the 1990s. He played for Parramatta and Balmain in the Australian Rugby League competition. He attended Patrician Brothers' College, Fairfield.

== Playing career ==
Jolly made his first grade debut for Parramatta in round 22 of the 1996 ARL season against Penrith at Penrith Park which ended in a 24–16 loss.

Jolly joined Balmain in 1997 who had just returned to Leichhardt Oval after playing for two seasons at Parramatta Stadium and had dropped the name "Sydney Tigers" after it was deemed a failed experiment. Jolly scored his only try in the top grade against the Newcastle Knights in round 11 1997. Jolly made a total of 11 appearances for Balmain as they finished 9th on the table, missing out on the finals by 2 competition points.
