= Sione Fainu =

Tongan–Australian rugby league footballer

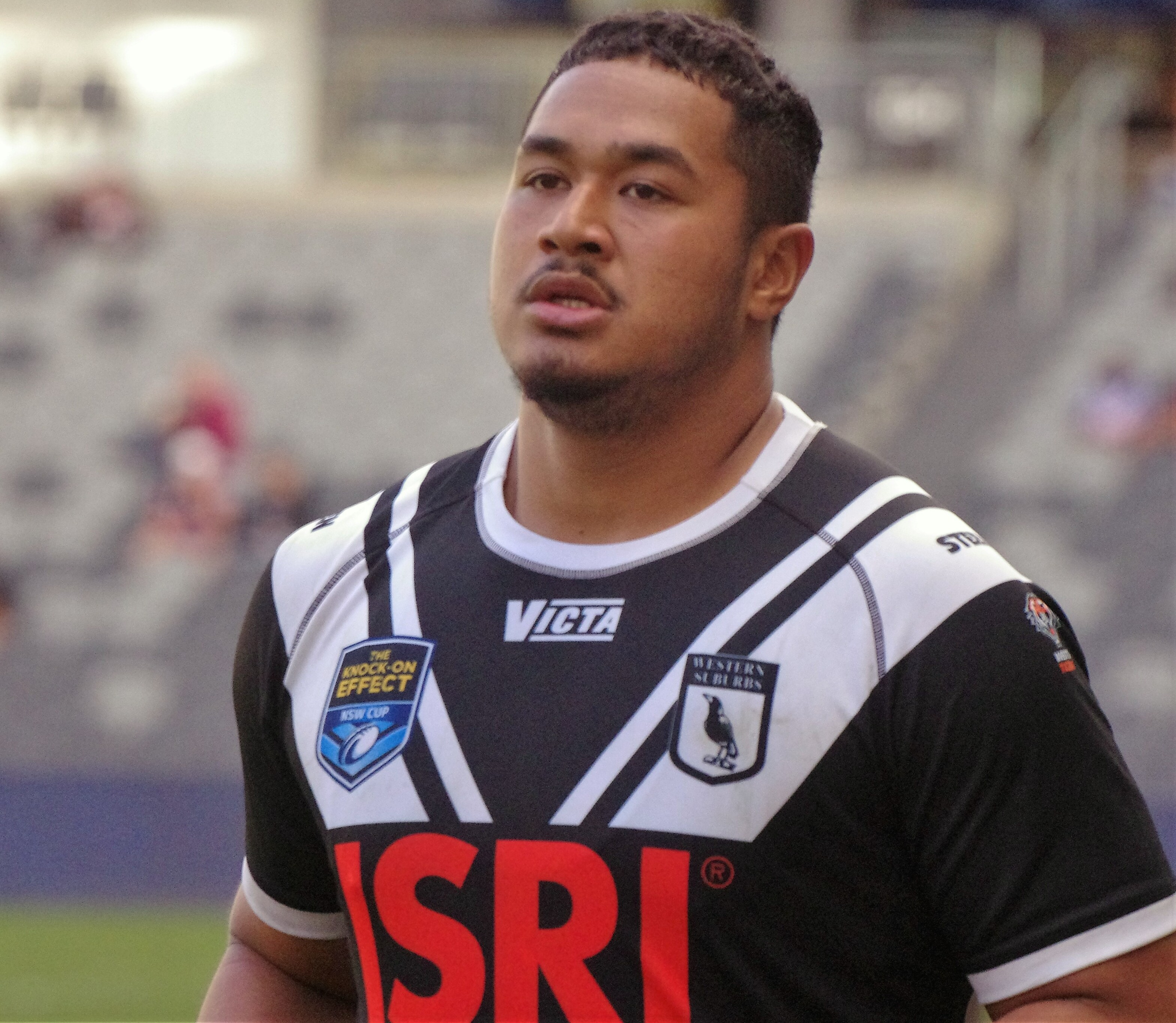

Personal information
- Full name: Sione Fainu
- Born: 4 July 2001 (age 25) Guildford, New South Wales, Australia
- Height: 183 cm (6 ft 0 in)
- Weight: 110 kg (17 st 5 lb)

Playing information
- Position: Prop, Second-row, Lock
Club
Years	Team	Pld	T	G	FG	P
2024–	Wests Tigers	59	6	0	0	24
- Source: As of 9 September 2026
- Education: Westfields Sports High School
- Relatives: Samuela Fainu (sister); Manase Fainu (brother); Latu Fainu (brother); Tevita Amone (uncle)

Sione Fainu (born 4 July 2001) is a Tongan–Australian professional rugby league footballer who plays as a second-row forward for the Wests Tigers in the National Rugby League (NRL).

== Background ==
Fainu was born in Westmead, New South Wales. He attended Westfields Sports High School, where he played rugby league. He is the brother of fellow NRL players Manase Fainu, Samuela Fainu and Latu Fainu; they are nephews of former NRL player Tevita Amone. Fainu represented New South Wales under-18s in 2019 as a prop.

He played for the Manly Warringah Sea Eagles' SG Ball Cup team in 2018 and 2019, and progressed to their Jersey Flegg team from 2019 to 2021 before moving to the Wests Tigers in 2022.

== Playing career ==
Fainu made his first grade debut for the Wests Tigers in Round 11 of the 2024 NRL season during Magic Round, playing in the forward pack against the Dolphins at Suncorp Stadium. He went on to make 12 appearances that year, scoring two tries and earning a full-time NRL contract extension through to 2026. On 11 February 2026, the Wests Tigers announced that Fainu had re-signed with the club for a further three years until the end of 2029. Fainu featured in every game for the Wests Tigers in the 2026 NRL season as the club finished 15th on the table.

== Statistics ==
Year	Team	Games	Tries	Pts
2024	Wests Tigers	12	2	8
2025	Wests Tigers	24	2	8
2026	Wests Tigers	4		
	Totals	40	4	16
