= Kyle White (rugby league) =

Australian rugby league footballer (1970–2023)

Personal information
- Born: 12 January 1970 Fairfield, New South Wales, Australia
- Died: 21 March 2023 (aged 53) Penrith, New South Wales, Australia

Playing information
- Height: 177 cm (5 ft 10 in)
- Weight: 94 kg (14 st 11 lb)
- Position: Prop, Second-row
Club
Years	Team	Pld	T	G	FG	P
1989–91	Canterbury Bulldogs	24	4	0	0	16
1992–95	Western Suburbs Magpies	34	2	0	0	8
1994–95	Workington Town	20	1	0	0	4
1996	Illawarra Steelers	9	1	0	0	4
1998	Widnes Vikings	2	0	0	0	0
	Total	89	8	0	0	32

Kyle White (12 January 1970 – 21 March 2023) was an Australian professional rugby league footballer who played for the Canterbury-Bankstown Bulldogs, Western Suburbs Magpies and the Illawarra Steelers in the NSWRL and ARL competitions. White also played for Widnes and Workington Town in England.

== Rugby league career ==
White, a forward, was a student at Patrician Brothers' College, Fairfield and earned Australian Schoolboys honours in 1987. From 1989 to 1991, White played first-grade for Canterbury as a second rower and amassed 24 premiership appearances. He captained Canterbury at Under 21s level.

White transferred to Western Suburbs in 1992 and made a switch to the front row, playing as a prop. Some of his first-grade games for Western Suburbs were with younger brother Josh, a five-eighth and halfback. During this period, White had a stint in England with Workington Town. After finishing his Australian career with a season at Illawarra in 1996, White had another stint in England, where he captained Widnes for two seasons.

== Personal life ==
During his time in Widnes he owned and ran Kelly's pub in the town centre. He was also noted to be a talented musician. In 2006, White contracted pneumonia and spent two weeks in a coma during which time his son, Levi, was born. He also had a stepdaughter, Eliza, who he helped raise from an early age.

In 2019, when White lived in Queensland he was reported to have struggled with alcoholism and a brief period of homelessness. In early 2020, he returned in Sydney and a few months later was engaged to Melanie Sullivan. On 21 March 2023, he died from a heart attack at the home they shared in Penrith at the age of 53. His brain was donated by Melanie Sullivan to research and the Australian Sports Brain Bank found that White had chronic traumatic encephalopathy (CTE) which is linked to repeated trauma to the head.
