= Samuela Fainu =

Australian rugby footballer (born 2004)

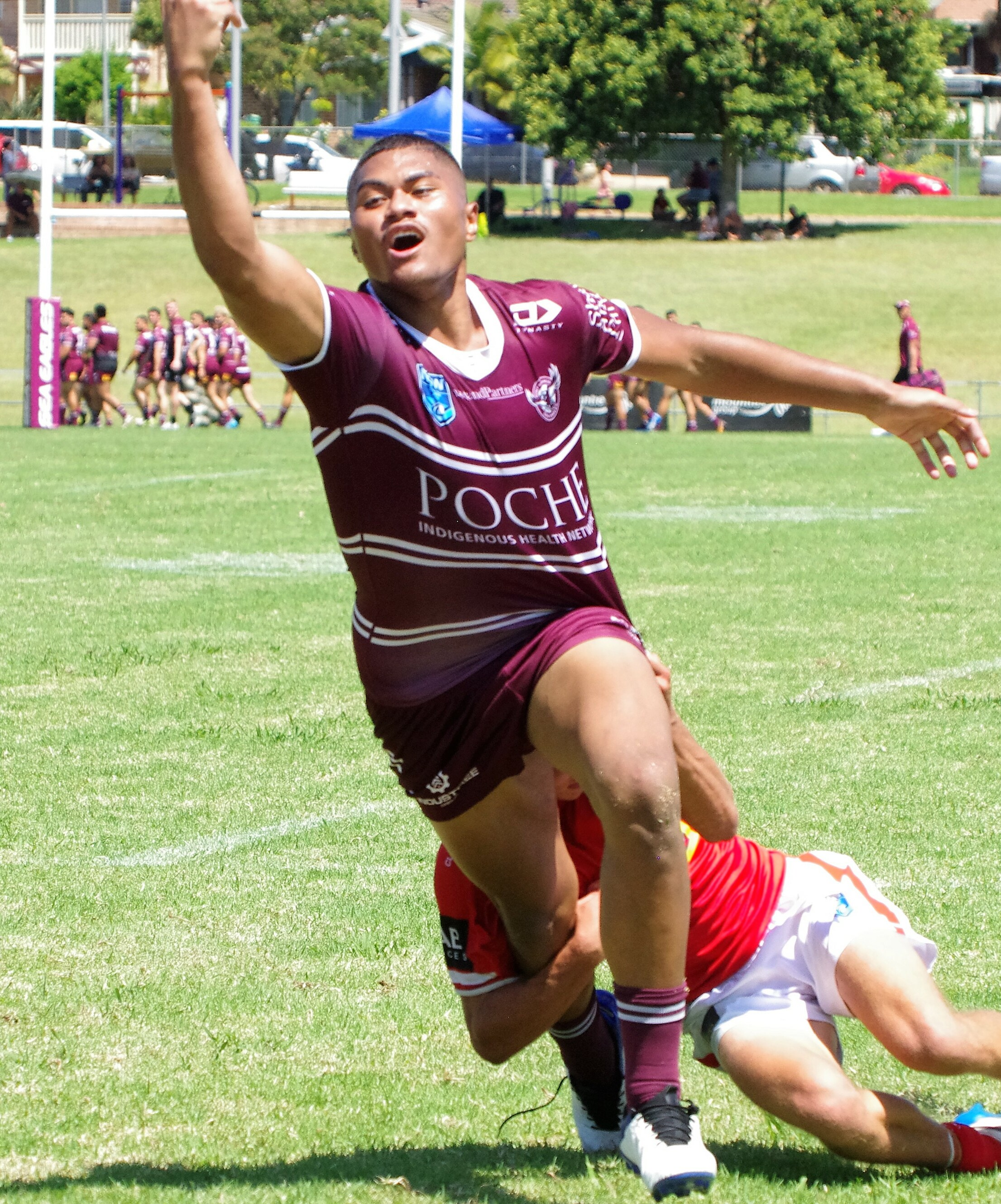

Personal information
- Full name: Samuela Fainu
- Born: 12 January 2004 (age 22) Guildford, New South Wales, Australia
- Height: 194 cm (6 ft 4 in)
- Weight: 109 kg (17 st 2 lb)

Playing information
- Position: Second-row
Club
Years	Team	Pld	T	G	FG	P
2023	Manly Sea Eagles	5	0	0	0	0
2024–	Wests Tigers	60	13	0	0	52
	Total	65	13	0	0	52
- Education: Patrician Brothers' College, Fairfield; Westfields Sports High School
- Relatives: Manase Fainu (brother); Sione Fainu (brother); Latu Fainu (brother); Tevita Amone (uncle)

Samuela Fainu (born 12 January 2004) is an Australian rugby league footballer who plays as a second-row forward for the Wests Tigers in the National Rugby League.

He previously played for the Manly Warringah Sea Eagles in the NRL.

== Background ==
Fainu was born in Guildford, New South Wales. He is of Tongan and Maori and Fijian descent. His uncle, Tevita Amone, played for the Western Suburbs Magpies and the North Queensland Cowboys.

He attended Patrician Brothers' College, Fairfield as well as Westfields Sports High School and played his junior rugby league for the Guildford Owls.

He has three brothers, Manase, Sione, and Latu, who were all signed to the Manly club.

== Playing career ==
Fainu started at prop in the 2021 Harold Matthews Cup winning side, including scoring a second-half try in the Grand Final win over Parramatta Eels. Fainu earned a promotion to Manly’s SG Ball Cup (Under 19s) team in 2022, making seven appearances for two tries, two try assists, four line-break assists, 13 offloads and 150 tackles (21.4 per game).

Fainu pushed ahead to the Jersey Flegg Cup (Under 21s) later in the year whilst still eligible for Under 19s, playing seven games with three tries including a double on debut in round 14. Fainu made the NSW Under 19s squad in 2022.

Fainu made his first grade debut from the bench in his side's 12−6 victory over the Wests Tigers at Campbelltown Stadium in round 8 of the 2023 NRL season. In July 2023, Fainu signed a four-year deal worth $2 million to join the Wests Tigers ahead of the 2024 NRL season. Fainu made his club debut for the Wests Tigers in round 2 of the 2024 NRL season against Canberra. Fainu played 23 games for the Wests Tigers throughout the 2024 NRL season as the club finished with the Wooden Spoon for a third consecutive year. Fainu played 15 games for the Wests Tigers in the 2026 NRL season as the club finished 15th on the table.

On 22 October 2026, the Tigers announced that Fainu had re-signed with the Tigers until the end of 2029.

== Statistics ==
Year	Team	Games	Tries	Pts
2023	Manly Warringah Sea Eagles	5		
2024	Wests Tigers	23	5	20
2025	Wests Tigers	21	4	16
2026	Wests Tigers	15	4	16
2027	Wests Tigers			
	Totals	65	13	52
