= Chris Yates (rugby union) =

Australian rugby union player

Chris Yates (born 14 November 1974) is an Australian rugby union player.

Yates was born in Sydney, New South Wales. He has represented Australia at 7 a side rugby and played first grade rugby with Northern Suburbs in Sydney. In Europe Yates has played for such teams as FC Brescia, Italy, Sundays Well, Ireland, Sale Sharks, Gloucester Rugby and Worcester Warriors. He also played for Hong Kong Football Club from 1997 to 1999 and was Hong Kong Player of the Year in 1999. He played as a flyhalf or inside centre.

He now runs an Orthopaedic Business in Sydney, Australia.
