= Taniela Paseka =

Tonga international rugby league footballer

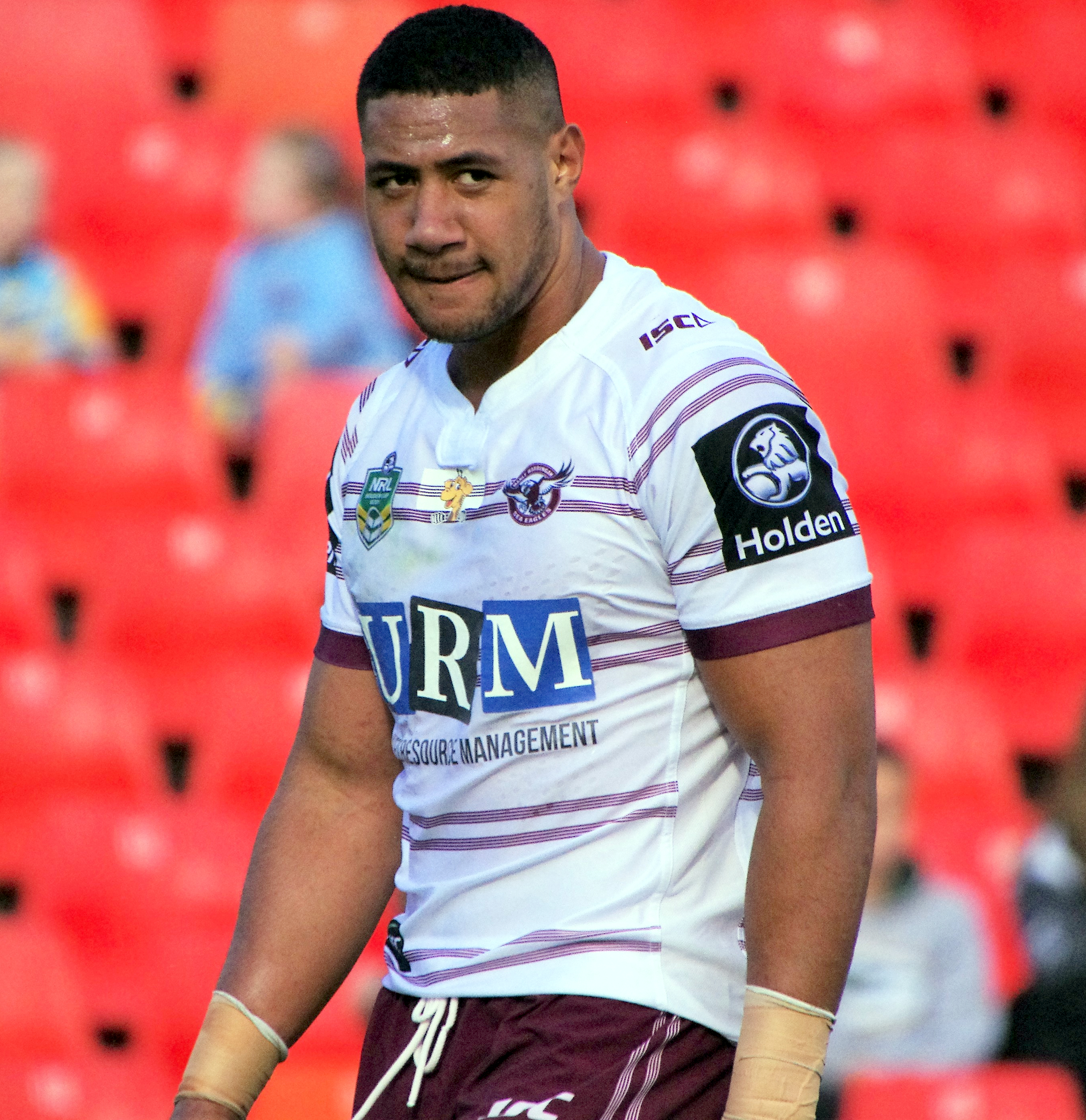

Personal information
- Born: 8 October 1997 (age 29) Auckland, New Zealand
- Height: 197 cm (6 ft 6 in)
- Weight: 120 kg (18 st 13 lb)

Playing information
- Position: Prop
Club
Years	Team	Pld	T	G	FG	P
2018–	Manly Sea Eagles	143	9	0	0	36
Representative
Years	Team	Pld	T	G	FG	P
2024–	Tonga	6	0	0	0	0
- Source: As of 7 November 2026

Taniela Paseka (born 8 October 1997) is a Tonga international rugby league footballer who plays as a prop for the Manly Warringah Sea Eagles in the National Rugby League (NRL).

== Background ==
Paseka was born in Ōtāhuhu, New Zealand and is of Tongan descent. Although born in New Zealand, Paseka has chosen to play rugby league for Tonga at international level.

He played his junior rugby league for All Saints Liverpool junior and attended Patrician Brothers' College, Fairfield and Mount Carmel Catholic College.

== Playing career ==
=== Early career ===
Paseka played in the Under 20s for the Wests Tigers before joining Manly for the 2018 season, he also appeared in a Musashi ad.

=== 2018 ===
In round 6 of the 2018 NRL season, Paseka made his Manly début in the National Rugby League against the Wests Tigers. Paseka played a total of 13 games for Manly in 2018 as the club endured one of their worst seasons on the field finishing 15th on the table and narrowly avoiding the wooden spoon.

=== 2019 ===
Paseka made 13 appearances for Manly in the 2019 NRL season as the club finished sixth on the table. Paseka missed out on playing in the club's finals campaign with a knee injury he sustained in round 25 against Parramatta.

=== 2020 ===
Paseka played 18 games for Manly-Warringah in the 2020 NRL season as they finished a disappointing 13th on the table.

=== 2021 ===
Paseka played 24 games for Manly in the 2021 NRL season including the club's preliminary final loss against South Sydney.

=== 2022 ===
Paseka made 11 appearances for Manly in the 2022 NRL season. The club would finish 11th on the table and miss out on the finals.

=== 2023 ===
On 25 July, it was announced that Paseka would miss the remainder of the 2023 NRL season with a medial ligament injury which he suffered during Manly's 30–26 victory over Cronulla in the battle of the beaches game.

=== 2024 ===
On 5 August, Paseka re-signed with the club until the end of the 2029 season. Paseka played 23 matches for Manly in the 2024 NRL season as they finished 7th on the table and qualified for the finals. Manly would be eliminated in the second week of the finals by the Sydney Roosters.

On 8 October, Paseka got a long-awaited international selection when he was named in the 21 man Tongan squad for the 2024 Pacific Championships. Paseka will join Manly teammates Haumole Olakau'atu, Tolu Koula and 19 year old rookie Lehi Hopoate in the team.

=== 2025 ===
Paseka would be ruled out for the rest of the season after suffering a ruptured Achilles during Manly's win against Canberra in round 3.

=== 2026 ===
Paseka featured in 20 matches for Manly in the 2026 NRL season as the club finished 9th on the table.

== Statistics ==
Year	Team	Games	Tries	Pts
2018	Manly Warringah Sea Eagles	13		
2019	Manly Warringah Sea Eagles	13	1	4
2020	Manly Warringah Sea Eagles	18	3	12
2021	Manly Warringah Sea Eagles	24		
2022	Manly Warringah Sea Eagles	11	2	8
2023	Manly Warringah Sea Eagles	18		
2024	Manly Warringah Sea Eagles	23	1	4
2025	Manly Warringah Sea Eagles	3		
2026	Manly Warringah Sea Eagles	9	1	4
2027	Manly Warringah Sea Eagles			
	Totals	132	8	32
