= Chris Yates (rugby league) =

Australian rugby league footballer

Personal information
- Full name: Christopher Yates
- Born: 5 August 1974 (age 51) Sydney, New South Wales, Australia

Playing information
- Position: Prop, Second-row
Club
Years	Team	Pld	T	G	FG	P
1997–99	Western Suburbs	26	0	0	0	0
- Source: RLP As of 2 December 2024

Chris Yates (born in Sydney, New South Wales) is an Australian former rugby league footballer for the Western Suburbs Magpies in the National Rugby League. Yates attended Patrician Brothers' College, Fairfield
