= Brett Lobb =

Australian rugby league footballer

Personal information
- Full name: Brett Lobb
- Born: 28 July 1961 (age 63); Sydney, New South Wales, Australia

Playing information
- Position: Wing, Fullback
Club
Years	Team	Pld	T	G	FG	P
1982–87	Penrith Panthers	74	15	10	0	77

Brett Lobb (born 28 July 1961) is an Australian former professional rugby league footballer who played during the 1980s. He played his entire club football career with the Penrith Panthers. He played primarily on the wing, but also played the occasional game at fullback

== Playing career ==
Brett attended Patrician Brothers' College, Fairfield. He was graded by the Panthers in 1981. He made his first grade debut from the bench in his side's 9−6 loss to the Cronulla Sharks at Endeavour Field in round 16 of the 1982 season. Lobb made his first appearance on the wing the following week in his side's 18−all draw with the Balmain Tigers at Leichhardt Oval, he also scored his first try in first grade in this match. Lobb was a constant selection in the Penrith backline throughout the early to mid-1980s. He had his best season at the club in the 1984 season, he played in 22 of his side's 24 games and scored 7 tries.

Lobb played most of his career on the wing, however he played most of the 1985 season at fullback. He scored the solitary try early in the Panthers historic 10−7 victory over the Manly Sea Eagles in the historic playoff for fifth that qualified the club for their maiden finals appearance in 1985. Lobb made his lone appearance in a finals match the following week when the Panthers (in their first ever finals match in the club's history) lost 38−6 to the Parramatta Eels at the SCG in the 1985 season.

Lobb's final game in first grade came in his side's 30−4 loss to the Parramatta Eels at Penrith Park in the final round of the 1987 season. He remained with the club for a further three seasons, playing in reserve grade until he finished at the end of the 1990 season. In total, Lobb played 74 games, and scored 15 tries, and kicked 10 goals
