= Francis Vaiotu =

New Zealand rugby league footballer

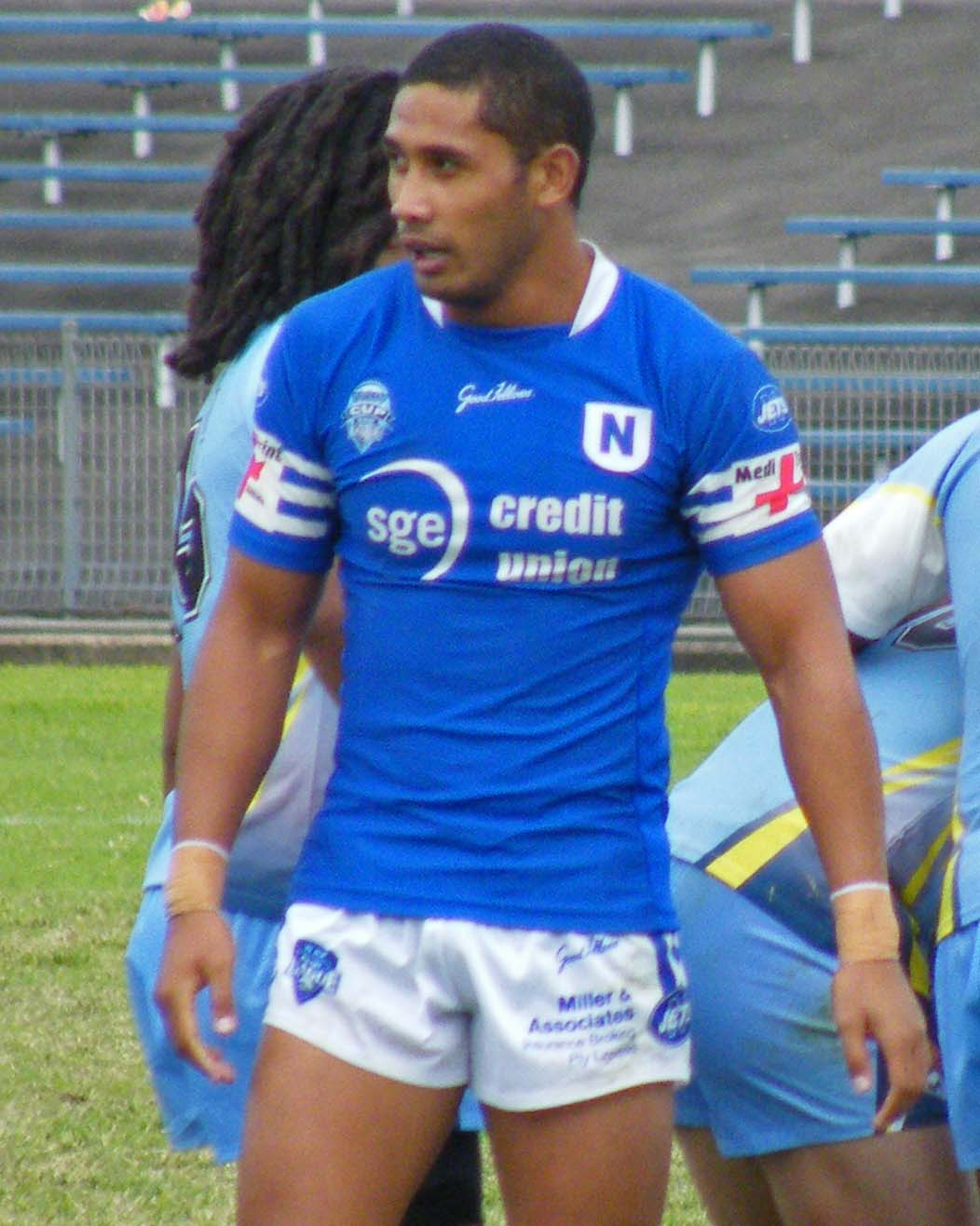
- Francis Vaiotu in March 2011

Personal information
- Born: 8 January 1986 (age 40) New Zealand
- Height: 193 cm (6 ft 4 in)
- Weight: 100 kg (15 st 10 lb)

Playing information
- Position: Wing, Centre
Club
Years	Team	Pld	T	G	FG	P
2011	Sydney Roosters	1	0	0	0	0

Francis Vaiotu (born 8 January 1986) is a New Zealand rugby league footballer for Sydney Roosters in the National Rugby League. His positions of choice is Winger or Centre. He made his NRL Debut in Round 14 2011 against the Melbourne Storm. Francis has a Diploma in Community Welfare from TAFE and a Bachelor of Health Science PDHPE degree from the University of Western Sydney. Vaiotu is a product of rugby league club Cabramatta Two Blues and school Fairfield Patrician Brothers College. He is married to Erin Vaiotu (m. 2016).
