= Glenn Grief =

Australian rugby league footballer

Personal information
- Born: 15 August 1973 (age 52) Fairfield, New South Wales, Australia

Playing information
- Height: 178 cm (5 ft 10 in)
- Weight: 98 kg (15 st 6 lb)
- Position: Prop
Club
Years	Team	Pld	T	G	FG	P
1993–95	Western Suburbs	48	5	0	0	20
1996–01	Newcastle Knights	96	12	1	0	50
2002	South Sydney	1	0	0	0	0
	Total	145	17	1	0	70
Representative
Years	Team	Pld	T	G	FG	P
1995	NSW City	1	0	0	0	0

Glenn Grief (born 15 August 1973) is an Australian former professional rugby league footballer who played in the 1990s and 2000s. A City New South Wales representative forward, he played in the NRL for the Western Suburbs Magpies, Newcastle Knights and South Sydney Rabbitohs.

== Background ==
Grief was born in Fairfield, New South Wales

== Playing career ==
Grief made his debut for Western Suburbs in round 7 of the 1993 season against Manly-Warringah at Campbelltown Stadium.

Grief played most of his career with the Newcastle Knights . He played for Newcastle from the interchange bench in their upset 2001 NRL grand final victory over Parramatta. The following year, he joined South Sydney and played in their first game back after re-admission which was a 40–6 loss against arch-rivals the Sydney Roosters. This would be Grief's final game in the top grade.
