= Warren McDonnell =

Australian rugby league footballer

Personal information
- Born: 18 January 1959 (age 66)

Playing information
Club
Years	Team	Pld	T	G	FG	P
1981	Parramatta	1	0	0	0	0
1982	Eastern Suburbs	4	0	0	0	0
	Total	5	0	0	0	0

Warren McDonnell (born 18 January 1959) is a former Australian professional rugby league player. He made five appearances off the bench in the NSWRFL for Parramatta (1981) and the Eastern Suburbs (1982).
