= Barry Davis (rugby league) =

Australian rugby league footballer

Personal information
- Full name: Barry Davis
- Born: 11 January 1979 (age 47)

Playing information
- Position: Wing
Club
Years	Team	Pld	T	G	FG	P
1999	Western Suburbs	15	4	0	0	16
- Source: As of 6 January 2023

Barry Davis is an Australian former professional rugby league footballer who played in the 1990s. He played for Western Suburbs in the NRL competition.

== Playing career ==
Davis made his first grade debut for Western Suburbs in round 5 of the 1999 NRL season against Newcastle at Parramatta Stadium. Davis played 15 games for the club throughout the year as the club finished with the Wooden Spoon. Western Suburbs won only three games for the year and conceded 944 points throughout the season which was an average of 39.33 per game, the most in NSWRL/NRL history. At the end of 1999, Western Suburbs merged with fellow foundation club Balmain to form the Wests Tigers. Davis was not offered a contract to play with the new team.
