= Darren Pettet =

Australian rugby league footballer and administrator

Personal information
- Full name: Darren Pettet
- Born: 4 April 1975 (age 51)

Playing information
- Position: Second-row, Lock
Club
| Years | Team | Pld | T | G | FG | P |
|---|---|---|---|---|---|---|
| 1996–97 | Parramatta Eels | 6 | 0 | 0 | 0 | 0 |

Darren Pettet is an Australian former professional rugby league footballer who played in the 1990s. He played for Parramatta in the Australian Rugby League competition.

== Early life ==
Pettet grew up in Coolah, New South Wales before moving to Sydney and signing with Parramatta. He attended Patricians Brothers Fairfield.

== Playing career ==
Pettet made his first grade debut for Parramatta in round 7 1996 against the Auckland Warriors at Mt. Smart Stadium which ended in a 28–4 loss.

In the 1997 ARL season, Parramatta reached the finals for the first time since their premiership success in 1986 as they finished third during the regular season. Pettet played from the bench in Parramatta's qualifying final loss against the Newcastle Knights. Parramatta had led the match 20–2 at halftime before losing 28–20.

The following week, Pettet again played from the bench in the club's 24–14 loss against North Sydney at the Sydney Football Stadium. Once again, Parramatta had the halftime lead before capitulating in the second half. This was Pettet's final top grade appearance for Parramatta and he continued to play in the lower grades until he snapped his achilles and was released by the club.

Pettet then moved to Forster and played in the local competition there with the Forster Tuncurry Hawks.

== Post playing ==
In 2016, Pettet was named as the head coach of the Forster Tuncurry Hawks.
