= Josh White (rugby league) =

Australian rugby league footballer (born 1971)

Personal information
- Full name: Josh White
- Born: 9 August 1971 (age 55)

Playing information
- Position: Halfback, Five-eighth
Club
Years	Team	Pld	T	G	FG	P
1993–95	Western Suburbs	19	4	0	0	16
1996	Illawarra Steelers	14	2	0	0	8
1997	London Broncos	24	10	0	1	41
1998	Salford City Reds	25	11	7	1	59
	Total	82	27	7	2	124
- Source: As of 21 December 2022

Josh White is an Australian former professional rugby league footballer who played in the 1990s. He played for Western Suburbs and the Illawarra Steelers in the ARL competition. He also played for Salford and the London Broncos in the Super League. He is the younger brother of former rugby league player Kyle White.

== Playing career ==
White started his rugby league career at the Canterbury Bulldogs as a 17 year old and played from 1989 - 1991. White made his first grade debut in round 1 of the 1993 NSWRL season against the Gold Coast Seagulls at Campbelltown Sports Stadium. White spent five seasons at Western Suburbs before joining Illawarra in 1996. White only spent one year at Illawarra making 14 appearances. White then signed for the London Broncos in the Super League and enjoyed a successful season as the club finished runners up in the competition and receiving the Super League Player of the Month in April 1997. In 1998, White signed for Salford and finished as the clubs joint top try scorer, however they would finish second last on the table.
