= 2016 Catalans Dragons season =

- Super League XXI Rank: 5th
- Play-off result: N/A
- Challenge Cup: Quarter-finals
- 2016 record: Wins: 14; draws: 0; losses: 11
- Points scored: For: 579; against: 463

Team information
- Chairman: Bernard Guasch
- Head Coach: Laurent Frayssinous
- Captain: Jason Baitieri
- Stadium: Stade Gilbert Brutus

Top scorers
- Tries: Jodie Broughton - 5
- Goals: Pat Richards - 29
- Points: Pat Richards - 74
← 2015	List of seasons	2017 →

This article details the Catalans Dragons rugby league football club's 2015 season. This was the Dragons 11th season in the Super League after they entered through the franchise system, becoming the first successful team.

== Table ==
=== Super League table ===
Pos	Team	Pld	W	D	L	PF	PA	PD	Pts	Qualification
1	Hull F.C.	23	17	0	6	605	465	+140	34	Super League Super 8s
2	Warrington Wolves	23	16	1	6	675	425	+250	33	Super League Super 8s
3	Wigan Warriors	23	16	0	7	455	440	+15	32	Super League Super 8s
4	St Helens	23	14	0	9	573	536	+37	28	Super League Super 8s
5	Catalans Dragons	23	13	0	10	593	505	+88	26	Super League Super 8s
6	Castleford Tigers	23	10	1	12	617	640	−23	21	Super League Super 8s
7	Widnes Vikings	23	10	0	13	499	474	+25	20	Super League Super 8s
8	Wakefield Trinity Wildcats	23	10	0	13	485	654	−169	20	Super League Super 8s
9	Leeds Rhinos	23	8	0	15	404	576	−172	16	The Qualifiers
10	Salford Red Devils	23	10	0	13	560	569	−9	14 (Note: Salford deducted 6 points for salary cap breaches in 2014 and 2015.)	The Qualifiers
11	Hull Kingston Rovers	23	6	2	15	486	610	−124	14	The Qualifiers
12	Huddersfield Giants	23	6	0	17	511	569	−58	12	The Qualifiers

Source: Rugby League Project
Rules for classification: 1) Points; 2) Points difference; 3) Number of points scored;

=== Super 8s table ===
Pos	Team	Pld	W	D	L	PF	PA	PD	Pts	Qualification
1	Warrington Wolves (L)	30	21	1	8	852	541	+311	43	Semi-finals
2	Wigan Warriors (C)	30	21	0	9	669	560	+109	42	Semi-finals
3	Hull F.C.	30	20	0	10	749	579	+170	40	Semi-finals
4	St Helens	30	20	0	10	756	641	+115	40	Semi-finals
5	Castleford Tigers	30	15	1	14	830	808	+22	31	
6	Catalans Dragons	30	15	0	15	723	716	+7	30	
7	Widnes Vikings	30	12	0	18	603	643	−40	24	
8	Wakefield Trinity	30	10	0	20	571	902	−331	20	

Source: BBC Sport
(C) Champions; (L) League Leaders' Shield Winners

== 2016 fixtures and results ==
LEGEND
Win
Draw
Loss

2016 Super League Fixtures

Date	Competition	Rnd	Vrs	H/A	Venue	Result	Score	Tries	Goals	Att	Live on TV
5/2/16	Super League XXI	1	Wigan	A	DW Stadium	L	6-12	Horo	Richards 1/1	13,436	Sky Sports
13/2/16	Super League XXI	2	Hull F.C.	H	Stade Gilbert Brutus	L	10-38	Richards (2)	Richards 1/2	10,234	Sky Sports
27/2/16	Super League XXI	3	Leeds	H	Stade Gilbert Brutus	W	32-28	Taylor (2), Myler, Inu, Gigot	Richards 6/6	Attendance	Sky Sports
6/3/16	Super League XXI	4	Wakefield Trinity	A	Belle Vue	W	42-28	Duport, Broughton, Richards, Baitieri, Stewart, Myler, Gigot (2)	Richards 5/8	4,442	-
12/3/16	Super League XXI	5	Warrington	H	Stade Gilbert Brutus	L	20-30	Carney, Richards, Duport	Richards 4/4	8,859	Sky Sports
20/3/16	Super League XXI	6	Huddersfield	A	Galpharm Stadium	W	46-26	Anderson, Stewart, Broughton (3), Aiton, Bousquet, Myler	Richards 7/8	Attendance	-
25/3/16	Super League XXI	7	Salford	A	AJ Bell Stadium	W	26-12	Gigot, Pélissier, Taylor (2)	Richards 5/5	Attendance	-
28/3/16	Super League XXI	8	Castleford	H	Stade Gilbert Brutus	W	41-22	Broughton, Anderson, Carney (2), Escare (2), Aiton	Bosc 6/7, Escare 1 DG	10,351	Sky Sports
2/4/16	Super League XXI	9	Widnes	H	Stade Gilbert Brutus	W/D/L	Score	Try Scorers	Goal Scorers	Attendance	Sky Sports

2016 Super 8's

Date	Competition	Rnd	Vrs	H/A	Venue	Result	Score	Tries	Goals	Att	Live on TV
0/0/16	Super League XXI	S1	Team	H/A	Stadium	W/D/L	Score	Try Scorers	Goal Scorers	Attendance	TV
0/0/16	Super League XXI	S2	Team	H/A	Stadium	W/D/L	Score	Try Scorers	Goal Scorers	Attendance	TV
0/0/16	Super League XXI	S3	Team	H/A	Stadium	W/D/L	Score	Try Scorers	Goal Scorers	Attendance	TV
0/0/16	Super League XXI	S4	Team	H/A	Stadium	W/D/L	Score	Try Scorers	Goal Scorers	Attendance	TV
0/0/16	Super League XXI	S5	Team	H/A	Stadium	W/D/L	Score	Try Scorers	Goal Scorers	Attendance	TV
0/0/16	Super League XXI	S6	Team	H/A	Stadium	W/D/L	Score	Try Scorers	Goal Scorers	Attendance	TV
0/0/16	Super League XXI	S7	Team	H/A	Stadium	W/D/L	Score	Try Scorers	Goal Scorers	Attendance	TV

== Player appearances ==
- Super League Only

FB=Fullback	C=Centre	W=Winger	SO=Stand-off	SH=Scrum half	PR=Prop	H=Hooker	SR=Second Row	L=Loose forward	B=Bench

No	Player	1	2	3	4	5	6	7	8	9	10	11	12	13	14	15	16	17	18	19	20	21	22	23	S1	S2	S3	S4	S5	S6	S7
1	Tony Gigot	FB	FB	FB	FB	FB	FB	FB	C	x	x	x	x	x	x	x	x	x	x	x	x	x	x	x	x	x	x	x	x	x	x
2	Jodie Broughton			W	W	W	W	W	W	x	x	x	x	x	x	x	x	x	x	x	x	x	x	x	x	x	x	x	x	x	x
3	Krisnan Inu	C	C	C	C	C	C	Red card	Red card	x	x	x	x	x	x	x	x	x	x	x	x	x	x	x	x	x	x	x	x	x	x
4	Vincent Duport	C	C	C	C	C	C	C	C	x	x	x	x	x	x	x	x	x	x	x	x	x	x	x	x	x	x	x	x	x	x
5	Pat Richards	W	W	W	W	W	W	W		x	x	x	x	x	x	x	x	x	x	x	x	x	x	x	x	x	x	x	x	x	x
6	Todd Carney	SO	SO	SO	SO	SO	SO	SO	SO	x	x	x	x	x	x	x	x	x	x	x	x	x	x	x	x	x	x	x	x	x	x
7	Richie Myler	SH	SH	SH	SH	SH	SH	SH		x	x	x	x	x	x	x	x	x	x	x	x	x	x	x	x	x	x	x	x	x	x
8	Louis Anderson	P	P		P	L	SR	SR	SR	x	x	x	x	x	x	x	x	x	x	x	x	x	x	x	x	x	x	x	x	x	x
9	Paul Aiton	H					B	B	B	x	x	x	x	x	x	x	x	x	x	x	x	x	x	x	x	x	x	x	x	x	x
10	Rémi Casty				B	B	B	B	B	x	x	x	x	x	x	x	x	x	x	x	x	x	x	x	x	x	x	x	x	x	x
11	Glenn Stewart	SR	SR	SR	SR	SR	SR	SR	SR	x	x	x	x	x	x	x	x	x	x	x	x	x	x	x	x	x	x	x	x	x	x
12	Justin Horo	SR	SR	SR	SR	SR		C		x	x	x	x	x	x	x	x	x	x	x	x	x	x	x	x	x	x	x	x	x	x
13	Jason Baitieri	L	L	L	L	B	L		B	x	x	x	x	x	x	x	x	x	x	x	x	x	x	x	x	x	x	x	x	x	x
14	David Taylor	B	B	P	P	P	P	P	P	x	x	x	x	x	x	x	x	x	x	x	x	x	x	x	x	x	x	x	x	x	x
15	Julian Bousquet	P	P	P	B	B	P	P	P	x	x	x	x	x	x	x	x	x	x	x	x	x	x	x	x	x	x	x	x	x	x
16	Éloi Pélissier	B	H	H	H	H	H	H	H	x	x	x	x	x	x	x	x	x	x	x	x	x	x	x	x	x	x	x	x	x	x
17	Gregory Mounis	B	B	B			B	L	L	x	x	x	x	x	x	x	x	x	x	x	x	x	x	x	x	x	x	x	x	x	x
18	Thomas Bosc	x	B	B	B	B	x	x	SH	x	x	x	x	x	x	x	x	x	x	x	x	x	x	x	x	x	x	x	x	x	x
19	Olivier Elima	B	B	B						x	x	x	x	x	x	x	x	x	x	x	x	x	x	x	x	x	x	x	x	x	x
20	Fouad Yaha	W	W	x	x	x	x	x	W	x	x	x	x	x	x	x	x	x	x	x	x	x	x	x	x	x	x	x	x	x	x
21	Morgan Escare	x	x	x	x	x	x	x	FB	x	x	x	x	x	x	x	x	x	x	x	x	x	x	x	x	x	x	x	x	x	x
22	Antoni Maria	x	x	x	x	x	x	B	x	x	x	x	x	x	x	x	x	x	x	x	x	x	x	x	x	x	x	x	x	x	x
23	Stanislas Robin	x	x	x	x	x	x	x	x	x	x	x	x	x	x	x	x	x	x	x	x	x	x	x	x	x	x	x	x	x	x
24	Thibault Margalet	x	x	x	x	x	x	x	x	x	x	x	x	x	x	x	x	x	x	x	x	x	x	x	x	x	x	x	x	x	x
25	Ugo Perez	x	x	x	x	x	x	x	x	x	x	x	x	x	x	x	x	x	x	x	x	x	x	x	x	x	x	x	x	x	x
26	Jordan Sigismeau	x	x	x	x	x	x	x	x	x	x	x	x	x	x	x	x	x	x	x	x	x	x	x	x	x	x	x	x	x	x
27	Lucas Albert	x	x	x	x	x	x	x	x	x	x	x	x	x	x	x	x	x	x	x	x	x	x	x	x	x	x	x	x	x	x
29	Willie Mason	x	x	B	B	P	B	B	B	x	x	x	x	x	x	x	x	x	x	x	x	x	x	x	x	x	x	x	x	x	x

= Injured

= Suspended

== Challenge Cup ==
LEGEND
Win
Draw
Loss

Date	Competition	Rnd	Vrs	H/A	Venue	Result	Score	Tries	Goals	Att	TV
0/0/16	Cup	6th	Team	H/A	Stadium	W/D/L	Score	Try Scorers	Goal Scorers	Attendance	TV
0/0/16	Cup	QF	Team	H/A	Stadium	W/D/L	Score	Try Scorers	Goal Scorers	Attendance	TV

== Player appearances ==
- Challenge Cup Games only

FB=Fullback	C=Centre	W=Winger	SO=Stand Off	SH=Scrum half	P=Prop	H=Hooker	SR=Second Row	L=Loose forward	B=Bench

No	Player	6	QF
1	Tony Gigot	x	x
2	Jodie Broughton	x	x
3	Krisnan Inu	x	x
4	Vincent Duport	x	x
5	Pat Richards	x	x
6	Todd Carney	x	x
7	Richie Myler	x	x
8	Louis Anderson	x	x
9	Paul Aiton	x	x
10	Rémi Casty	x	x
11	Glenn Stewart	x	x
12	Justin Horo	x	x
13	Jason Baitieri	x	x
14	David Taylor	x	x
15	Julian Bousquet	x	x
16	Éloi Pélissier	x	x
17	Gregory Mounis	x	x
18	Thomas Bosc	x	x
19	Olivier Elima	x	x
20	Fouad Yaha	x	x
21	Morgan Escare	x	x
22	Antoni Maria	x	x
23	Stanislas Robin	x	x
24	Thibault Margalet	x	x
25	Ugo Perez	x	x
26	Jordan Sigismeau	x	x
27	Lucas Albert	x	x

== 2016 squad statistics ==
- Appearances and points include (Super League, Challenge Cup and Play-offs) as of 28 March 2016.

No	Player	Position	Age	Previous club	Apps	Tries	Goals	DG	Points
1	Tony Gigot	Fullback	N/A	London Broncos	8	4	0	0	16
2	Jodie Broughton	Winger	N/A	Huddersfield Giants	6	5	0	0	20
3	Krisnan Inu	Centre	N/A	Stade Français (RU)	6	1	0	0	4
4	Vincent Duport	Centre	N/A	Toulouse Olympique	8	2	0	0	8
5	Pat Richards	Wing	N/A	Wests Tigers	7	4	29	0	74
6	Todd Carney	Stand off	N/A	Cronulla Sharks	8	3	0	0	12
7	Richie Myler	Scrum half	N/A	Warrington Wolves	7	3	0	0	12
8	Louis Anderson	Prop	N/A	Warrington Wolves	7	2	0	0	8
9	Paul Aiton	Hooker	N/A	Leeds Rhinos	4	2	0	0	8
10	Rémi Casty	Prop	N/A	Sydney Roosters	5	0	0	0	0
11	Glenn Stewart	Second row	N/A	South Sydney Rabbitohs	8	2	0	0	8
12	Justin Horo	Second row	N/A	Manly Sea Eagles	6	1	0	0	4
13	Jason Baitieri	Loose forward	N/A	Sydney Roosters	7	1	0	0	4
14	David Taylor	Prop	N/A	Gold Coast Titans	8	4	0	0	16
15	Julian Bousquet	Prop	N/A	Lézignan Sangliers	8	1	0	0	4
16	Éloi Pélissier	Hooker	N/A	Catalans Dragons Academy	8	1	0	0	4
17	Gregory Mounis	Loose forward	N/A	Catalans Dragons Academy	6	0	0	0	0
18	Thomas Bosc	Scrum half	N/A	Catalans Dragons Academy	5	0	6	0	12
19	Olivier Elima	Prop	N/A	Bradford Bulls	3	0	0	0	0
20	Fouad Yaha	Winger	N/A	Catalans Dragons Academy	3	0	0	0	0
21	Morgan Escare	Fullback	N/A	Catalans Dragons Academy	1	2	0	1	9
22	Antoni Maria	Second row	N/A	Toulouse Olympique	1	0	0	0	0
23	Stanislas Robin	Fullback	N/A	Catalans Dragons Academy	0	0	0	0	0
24	Thibault Margalet	Prop	N/A	Catalans Dragons Academy	0	0	0	0	0
25	Ugo Perez	Wing	N/A	Catalans Dragons Academy	0	0	0	0	0
26	Jordan Sigismeau	Wing	N/A	Catalans Dragons Academy	0	0	0	0	0
27	Lucas Albert	Scrum half	N/A	Catalans Dragons Academy	0	0	0	0	0
29	Willie Mason	Prop	N/A	Manly Sea Eagles	6	0	0	0	0

= Injured = Suspended

== 2016 transfers in/out ==
In

Nat	Name	Moved From	Contract Length	Date announced
(Republic of Ireland)	Pat Richards	Wests Tigers	2 Years	July 2015
(England)	Richie Myler	Warrington Wolves	2 Years	July 2015
(New Zealand)	Krisnan Inu	Stade Français	1 ½ Years	July 2015
(Australia)	David Taylor	Gold Coast Titans	2 Years	August 2015
(Papua New Guinea)	Paul Aiton	Leeds Rhinos	3 Years	August 2015
(New Zealand)	Justin Horo	Manly Sea Eagles	2 Years	August 2015
(England)	Jodie Broughton	Huddersfield Giants	2 Years	August 2015
(Australia)	Glenn Stewart	South Sydney Rabbitohs	3 Years	September 2015

Out

Nat	Name	Moved To	Contract Length	Date announced
(England)	Elliott Whitehead	Canberra Raiders	2 Years	April 2015
(France)	Damien Cardace	France	1 ½ Years	June 2015
(France)	Mathias Pala	Leigh Centurions	1 ½ Years	June 2015
(France)	Gadwin Springer	Castleford Tigers	2 ½ Years	June 2015
(France)	Benjamin Garcia	Penrith Panthers	2 Years	June 2015
(Scotland)	Ian Henderson	Sydney Roosters	1 Year	August 2015
(Cook Islands)	Zeb Taia	Gold Coast Titans	2 Years	August 2015
(France)	Kevin Larroyer	Hull Kingston Rovers	3 Years	September 2015
(Tonga)	Michael Oldfield	South Sydney Rabbitohs	1 Year	October 2015
(Australia)	Willie Tonga	Leigh Centurions	2 Years	October 2015
(Australia)	Scott Dureau	Newcastle Knights	2 Years	December 2015
(Australia)	Ben Pomeroy			
