= 2015 Catalans Dragons season =

- Super League XX Rank: 8th
- Play-off result: Did not qualify
- Challenge Cup: Quarter-final
- 2015 record: Wins: 14; draws: 2; losses: 16
- Points scored: For: 802; against: 836

Team information
- Chairman: Bernard Guasch
- Head Coach: Laurent Frayssinous
- Captain: Gregory Mounis
- Stadium: Stade Gilbert Brutus

Top scorers
- Tries: Zeb Taia - 13
- Goals: Scott Dureau - 98
- Points: Scott Dureau - 210
← 2014	List of seasons	2016 →

This article details the Catalans Dragons rugby league football club's 2015 season. This is the Dragons 10th season in the Super League after they entered through the franchise system, becoming the first successful team.

== Pre season friendlies ==
LEGEND
Win
Draw
Loss

Catalan score is first.

Date	Competition	Vrs	H/A	Venue	Result	Score	Tries	Goals	Att
17/1/15	Pre Season	London	H	Stade Gilbert Brutus	W	32-16	Tonga, Escare (2), Pélissier, Pala, Pomeroy	Bosc 4/6	-
24/1/15	Pre Season	Chevaliers Cathares	H	Stade Gilbert Brutus	W	58-24	Pomeroy, Oldfield, Whitehead, Escare (2), Carney (2), Garcia, Cardace, Casty	Bosc 9/10	-

== Table ==
=== Super League ===
Pos	Team	Pld	W	D	L	PF	PA	PD	Pts	Qualification
1	Leeds Rhinos	23	16	1	6	758	477	+281	33	Super League Super 8s
2	St Helens	23	16	0	7	598	436	+162	32	Super League Super 8s
3	Wigan Warriors	23	15	1	7	589	413	+176	31	Super League Super 8s
4	Huddersfield Giants	23	13	2	8	538	394	+144	28	Super League Super 8s
5	Castleford Tigers	23	13	0	10	547	505	+42	26	Super League Super 8s
6	Warrington Wolves	23	12	0	11	552	456	+96	24	Super League Super 8s
7	Hull F.C.	23	11	0	12	452	484	−32	22	Super League Super 8s
8	Catalans Dragons	23	9	2	12	561	574	−13	20	Super League Super 8s
9	Widnes Vikings	23	9	1	13	518	565	−47	19	The Qualifiers
10	Hull Kingston Rovers	23	9	0	14	534	646	−112	18	The Qualifiers
11	Salford City Reds	23	8	1	14	447	617	−170	17	The Qualifiers
12	Wakefield Trinity Wildcats	23	3	0	20	402	929	−527	6	The Qualifiers

Source: Rugby League Project
Rules for classification: 1) Points; 2) Points difference; 3) Number of points scored;

=== Super 8s ===
Pos	Team	Pld	W	D	L	PF	PA	PD	Pts	Qualification
1	Leeds Rhinos (L, C)	30	20	1	9	944	650	+294	41	Semi-finals
2	Wigan Warriors	30	20	1	9	798	530	+268	41	Semi-finals
3	Huddersfield Giants	30	18	2	10	750	534	+216	38	Semi-finals
4	St Helens	30	19	0	11	766	624	+142	38	Semi-finals
5	Castleford Tigers	30	16	0	14	731	746	−15	32	
6	Warrington Wolves	30	15	0	15	714	636	+78	30	
7	Catalans Dragons	30	13	2	15	739	770	−31	28	
8	Hull F.C.	30	12	0	18	620	716	−96	24	

Source: Rugby League Project
(C) Champions; (L) League Leaders' Shield Winners

== 2015 fixtures and results ==
LEGEND
Win
Draw
Loss

2015 Super League Fixtures

Date	Competition	Rnd	Vrs	H/A	Venue	Result	Score	Tries	Goals	Att	Live on TV
6/2/15	Super League XX	1	St. Helens	A	Langtree Park	L	7-18	Pélissier	Bosc 1/1, Bosc 1 DG	12,008	Sky Sports
14/2/15	Super League XX	2	Castleford	H	Stade Gilbert Brutus	W	13-12	Escare, Whitehead	Dureau 2/4, Dureau 1 DG	6,584	Sky Sports
28/2/15	Super League XX	3	Warrington	H	Stade Gilbert Brutus	W	38-18	Tonga, Oldfield (2), Duport, Taia (2)	Dureau 7/7	8,946	Sky Sports
7/3/15	Super League XX	4	Salford	H	Stade Gilbert Brutus	D	40-40	Taia, Duport, Pomeroy (2), Oldfield, Whitehead, Henderson	Dureau 6/8	7,800	Sky Sports
15/3/15	Super League XX	5	Hull Kingston Rovers	A	Craven Park	L	20-50	Tonga, Oldfield, Casty, Pélissier	Dureau 2/4	6,723	-
20/3/15	Super League XX	6	Hull F.C.	A	KC Stadium	L	22-33	Duport, Bosc, Escare, Taia	Bosc 3/4	11,994	-
28/3/15	Super League XX	7	Leeds	H	Stade Gilbert Brutus	L	22-38	Whitehead (2), Pélissier, Cardace	Dureau 3/4	8,876	Sky Sports
2/4/15	Super League XX	8	Wakefield Trinity	A	Belle Vue	W	40-4	Garcia, Tonga, Pomeroy, Whitehead, Cardace (3)	Dureau 6/7	3,015	-
6/4/15	Super League XX	9	Widnes	H	Stade Gilbert Brutus	W	32-16	Tonga (2), Pélissier (2), Pala, Cardace	Bosc 3/4, Dureau 1/2	7,000	Sky Sports
12/4/15	Super League XX	10	Wigan	A	DW Stadium	L	0-34	-	-	12,162	-
19/4/15	Super League XX	11	Huddersfield	A	Galpharm Stadium	L	14-38	Dureau, Bousquet	Dureau 3/3	4,404	-
25/4/15	Super League XX	12	Hull Kingston Rovers	H	Stade Gilbert Brutus	W	32-24	Baitieri, Springer, Oldfield, Pélissier, Garcia, Whitehead	Bosc 4/6	Attendance	Sky Sports
3/5/15	Super League XX	13	Castleford	A	The Jungle	L	28-36	Yaha, Garcia (3), Taia	Dureau 4/5	5,704	-
9/5/15	Super League XX	14	St. Helens	H	Stade Gilbert Brutus	W	33-26	Garcia (2), Taia (2), Escare	Dureau 6/6, Dureau 1 DG	8,886	Sky Sports
23/5/15	Super League XX	15	Wigan	H	Stade Gilbert Brutus	W	58-16	Yaha (2), Gigot (3), Taia (3), Oldfield, Escare	Dureau 9/10	10,423	Sky Sports
31/5/15	Magic Weekend	16	Huddersfield	N	St James' Park	D	22-22	Pélissier, Carney (2), Taia	Dureau 3/4	26,970	Sky Sports
5/6/15	Super League XX	17	Warrington	A	Halliwell Jones Stadium	L	18-26	Gigot, Pélissier, Whitehead	Dureau 3/3	8,611	Sky Sports
13/6/15	Super League XX	18	Hull F.C.	H	Stade Gilbert Brutus	W	20-14	Bosc, Gigot, Mounis	Dureau 4/4	N/A	Sky Sports
20/6/15	Super League XX	19	Wakefield Trinity	A	Stade Gilbert Brutus	W	32-12	Pomeroy, Inu, Pélissier, Escare, Anderson	Dureau 6/6	7,843	Sky Sports
5/7/15	Super League XX	20	Salford	A	AJ Bell Stadium	L	14-18	Casty, Anderson	Dureau 3/3	5,078	-
12/7/15	Super League XX	21	Widnes	A	Halton Stadium	L	22-29	Anderson, Whitehead (2), Escare	Dureau 3/4	4,822	-
18/7/15	Super League XX	22	Huddersfield	H	Stade Gilbert Brutus	L	12-14	Inu, Escare	Dureau 2/2	9,761	Sky Sports
26/7/15	Super League XX	23	Leeds	A	Headingley Stadium	L	22-36	Gigot (2), Escare, Dureau	Dureau 3/4	15,534	-

2015 Super 8's

Date	Competition	Rnd	Vrs	H/A	Venue	Result	Score	Tries	Goals	Att	Live on TV
8/8/15	Super League XX	S1	St. Helens	H	Stade Gilbert Brutus	W	26-16	Gigot, Anderson, Escare	Dureau 7/7	7,392	-
14/8/15	Super League XX	S2	Huddersfield	A	Galpharm Stadium	L	12-24	Tonga, Carney	Inu 2/2	4,251	Sky Sports
22/8/15	Super League XX	S3	Castleford	H	Stade Gilbert Brutus	W	44-26	Gigot (3), Taia, Lima, Carney, Escare (2)	Inu 0/2, Bosc 6/6	7,473	Sky Sports
5/9/15	Super League XX	S4	Wigan	A	DW Stadium	L	16-42	Inu, Dureau, Sigismeau	Dureau 2/3	8,101	-
12/9/15	Super League XX	S5	Leeds	H	Stade Gilbert Brutus	W	46-16	Bosc (2), Inu (2), Carney, Sigismeau, Lima, Whitehead	Bosc 1/1, Dureau 5/6, Lima 1/1	8,851	Sky Sports
19/9/15	Super League XX	S6	Warrington	A	Halliwell Jones Stadium	L	6-48	Robin	Dureau 1/1	7,862	-
27/9/15	Super League XX	S7	Hull F.C.	A	KC Stadium	W	28-24	Garcia, Henderson, Inu, Whitehead, Bosc	Dureau 4/5	10,832	-

== Player appearances ==
- Super League Only

FB=Fullback	C=Centre	W=Winger	SO=Stand-off	SH=Scrum half	PR=Prop	H=Hooker	SR=Second Row	L=Loose forward	B=Bench

No	Player	1	2	3	4	5	6	7	8	9	10	11	12	13	14	15	16	17	18	19	20	21	22	23	S1	S2	S3	S4	S5	S6	S7
1	Morgan Escare	FB	FB	FB	FB	FB	FB	FB	Red card	FB	FB		FB	FB	FB	FB	FB	FB	FB	FB		FB	FB	FB	FB	FB	FB	FB	FB	FB	FB
2	Vincent Duport	W	W	W	W	W	W																								
3	Ben Pomeroy	C	C	C	C	C		C	C	C								C	C	C	C	C	C	C	C		C				
4	Willie Tonga	C	C	C	C	C	C	W	C	C	C	C		C	C	C	C							W	W	W					
5	Michael Oldfield	W	W	W	W	W	W					W	W	W		W	W	W													
6	Todd Carney			SO	SO		SO						SO		SO	SO	SO							SO		SO	SO	SO	SO		
7	Scott Dureau		SH	SH	SH	SH		SH	SH	SH	SH	SH		SH	SH	SH	SH	SH	SH	SH	SH	SH	SH	SH	SH	SH		SH	SH	SH	SH
8	Olivier Elima	B	B		B	P	P	B	B		B	P	P		P	P	P	P		B	B			P	P	P	P	P	P	P	P
9	Ian Henderson	SH	H	H	H	H	H	H	H	H	H	H	H	H	H	H	H	H	H		H	H	H	H	H	H	B		H	H	H
10	Rémi Casty	P				B	P	P	P	P	P	P	P	P	P	P	P	P	P	P	P	P	P								
11	Zeb Taia	SR	SR	SR	SR	SR	SR	C	SR	SR	SR	C	SR	SR	SR	SR	SR	SR	SR						SR	SR	SR	SR	SR		
12	Louis Anderson	L	P	P	P	B	B	SR		B	SR	SR		P	B	B	B	B	B	SR	SR	SR	SR	SR	B	SR	B	B			SR
13	Gregory Mounis	B	L	L	L	L			B	B	B				B	B	B		B	B	B	B	B								
14	Thomas Bosc	SO	SO	x	x	SO	SH	SO	SO	SO	SO	SO	SH	SO					SO	SO					SO	B	SH	W	W	SO	SO
15	Jeff Lima	P	P	P	P	P	B	P			P	B								P	P	P	P	P	P	P	P	P	P	P	
16	Éloi Pélissier	H	B	Red card	Red card	B	B	B	B	B	B	B	B	B		B	B	B	B	H			B	B	B		H	H	B		
17	Elliott Whitehead	SR	SR	SR	SR	SR	SR	SR	SR	SR	C	SR	SR	SR	SR	SR	SR	SR	SR	SR	SR	SR	SR	SR	SR	SR	SR	SR	SR	SR	SR
18	Benjamin Garcia	B	B	B	B			B	P	P	B	B	B	B	C				B	B	C	B	B	B	B	B	B		B	SR	C
19	Mathias Pala	x	x	x	x	x	x	x	W	W	W		C						x	x	x	x	x	x	x	x	x	x	x	x	x
20	Damien Cardace	x	x	x	x	x	C	W	W	W	W	W	C	C	W				W												
21	Julian Bousquet	B	x	B	B	B	B	B	B	B	x	B	B	B	B	B	B	B	P		B	B	B	B	B	B	B	B	B	B	P
22	Gadwin Springer	x	x	x	x	x	x	x	x	x	x	x	B	B							x	x	x	x	x	x	x	x	x	x	x
23	Antoni Maria	x	x	B	x	x	x	x	x	x	x	x	x	x	x	x	x	B	x	x	B					B			B	B	B
24	Jason Baitieri	x	B	B	B		L	L	L	L	L	L	L	L	L	L	L	L	L	L	L	L	L	L	L	L	L	L	L	L	L
25	Joan Guasch	x	x	x	x	x	x	x	x	x	x	x	x	x	x	x	x	x	x	B	x	x	x	x	x	x	x	x	x	B	B
26	Stanislas Robin	x	x	x	x	x	x	x	FB	x	x	FB	x	x	B	x	x	SO	x	x	SO					x	x	B	x	W	B
27	Fouad Yaha	x	x	x	x	x	x	x	x	x	x	x	W	W	W	W	W	W	W	W	W					x	x	x	x	x	x
28	Tony Gigot	x	x	x	x	x	x	x	x	x	x	x	x	x	x	C	C	C	C	C	FB	C	C	C	C	C	C	C	C	C	C
29	Thibault Margalet	x	x	x	x	x	x	x	x	x	x	x	x	x	x	x	x	x	x	x	x	B		B	x	x	x	B	x	x	x
30	Krisnan Inu	x	x	x	x	x	x	x	x	x	x	x	x	x	x	x	x	x	x	W	W	W	W	W	W	W	W	C	C	C	W
31	Jordan Sigismeau	x	x	x	x	x	x	x	x	x	x	x	x	x	x	x	x	x	x	x	x	W	W		x	x	W	W	W	W	W
32	Lucas Albert	x	x	x	x	x	x	x	x	x	x	x	x	x	x	x	x	x	x	x	x	SO	SO		x	x	x	x	x	x	x
33	Ugo Perez	x	x	x	x	x	x	x	x	x	x	x	x	x	x	x	x	x	x	x	x	x	x	x	x	x	x	x	x	B	B

= Injured

= Suspended

== Challenge Cup ==
LEGEND
Win
Draw
Loss

Date	Competition	Rnd	Vrs	H/A	Venue	Result	Score	Tries	Goals	Att	TV
17/5/15	Cup	6th	Featherstone Rovers	H	Stade Gilbert Brutus	W	37-34	Tonga, Bosc (2), Maria, Yaha, Escare	Bosc 4/4, Bousquet 1/1, Cardace 1/1, Robin 1 DG	9,000	-
25/6/15	Cup	QF	Hull Kingston Rovers	A	Craven Park	L	26-32	Inu (2), Taia, Henderson, Whitehead	Dureau 3/4	6,073	Sky Sports

== Player appearances ==
- Challenge Cup Games only

FB=Fullback	C=Centre	W=Winger	SO=Stand Off	SH=Scrum half	P=Prop	H=Hooker	SR=Second Row	L=Loose forward	B=Bench

No	Player	6	QF
1	Morgan Escare	FB	FB
2	Vincent Duport		
3	Ben Pomeroy		C
4	Willie Tonga	C	
5	Michael Oldfield	W	
6	Todd Carney		
7	Scott Dureau		SH
8	Olivier Elima		
9	Ian Henderson		H
10	Rémi Casty	P	P
11	Zeb Taia		SR
12	Louis Anderson	SR	B
13	Gregory Mounis	L	B
14	Thomas Bosc	SO	
15	Jeff Lima	P	
16	Éloi Pélissier	H	B
17	Elliott Whitehead	SR	SR
18	Benjamin Garcia	x	B
19	Mathias Pala	x	x
20	Damien Cardace	B	
21	Julian Bousquet	B	P
22	Gadwin Springer	B	
23	Antoni Maria	B	x
24	Jason Baitieri		L
25	Joan Guasch	x	x
26	Stanislas Robin	SH	SO
27	Fouad Yaha	W	W
28	Tony Gigot	C	C
30	Krisnan Inu	x	W

== 2015 squad statistics ==
- Appearances and points include (Super League, Challenge Cup and Play-offs) as of 27 September 2015.

No	Player	Position	Age	Previous club	Apps	Tries	Goals	DG	Points
1	Morgan Escare	Fullback	N/A	Catalans Dragons Academy	29	12	0	0	48
2	Vincent Duport	Winger	N/A	Toulouse Olympique	6	3	0	0	12
3	Ben Pomeroy	Centre	N/A	Cronulla Sharks	18	4	0	0	16
4	Willie Tonga	Centre	N/A	Parramatta Eels	19	7	0	0	28
5	Michael Oldfield	Wing	N/A	Sydney Roosters	13	6	0	0	24
6	Todd Carney	Stand off	N/A	Cronulla Sharks	12	5	0	0	20
7	Scott Dureau	Scrum half	N/A	Newcastle Knights	27	3	98	2	210
8	Olivier Elima	Prop	N/A	Bradford Bulls	24	0	0	0	0
9	Ian Henderson	Hooker	N/A	New Zealand Warriors	29	3	0	0	12
10	Rémi Casty	Prop	N/A	Sydney Roosters	21	2	0	0	8
11	Zeb Taia	Second row	N/A	Newcastle Knights	24	13	0	0	52
12	Louis Anderson	Second row	N/A	Warrington Wolves	28	4	0	0	16
13	Gregory Mounis	Loose forward	N/A	Catalans Dragons Academy	18	1	0	0	4
14	Thomas Bosc	Scrum half	N/A	Catalans Dragons Academy	21	7	22	1	73
15	Jeff Lima	Second row	N/A	South Sydney Rabbitohs	21	2	1	0	10
16	Éloi Pélissier	Hooker	N/A	Catalans Dragons Academy	24	9	0	0	36
17	Elliott Whitehead	Second row	N/A	Bradford Bulls	32	12	0	0	48
18	Benjamin Garcia	Loose forward	N/A	Catalans Dragons Academy	24	8	0	0	32
19	Mathias Pala	Centre	N/A	Balmain Tigers	4	1	0	0	4
20	Damien Cardace	Wing	N/A	Catalans Dragons Academy	11	5	1	0	22
21	Julian Bousquet	Prop	N/A	Lézignan Sangliers	29	1	1	0	6
22	Gadwin Springer	Prop	N/A	Catalans Dragons Academy	3	1	0	0	4
23	Antoni Maria	Second row	N/A	Toulouse Olympique	8	1	0	0	4
24	Jason Baitieri	Loose forward	N/A	Sydney Roosters	29	1	0	0	4
25	Joan Guasch	Hooker	N/A	Catalans Dragons Academy	3	0	0	0	0
26	Stanislas Robin	Fullback	N/A	Catalans Dragons Academy	10	1	0	1	5
27	Fouad Yaha	Winger	N/A	Catalans Dragons Academy	11	4	0	0	16
28	Tony Gigot	Centre	N/A	London Broncos	18	11	0	0	44
29	Thibault Margalet	Prop	N/A	Catalans Dragons Academy	3	0	0	0	0
30	Krisnan Inu	Centre	N/A	Stade Français (RU)	13	8	2	0	36
31	Jordan Sigismeau	Wing	N/A	Catalans Dragons Academy	7	2	0	0	8
32	Lucas Albert	Scrum half	N/A	Catalans Dragons Academy	2	0	0	0	0
33	Ugo Perez	Wing	N/A	Catalans Dragons Academy	2	0	0	0	0

= Injured = Suspended

== 2015 transfers in/out ==
In

Nat	Name	Moved From	Contract Length	Date announced
(Australia)	Willie Tonga	Parramatta Eels	2 Years	July 2014
(Australia)	Todd Carney	Cronulla Sharks	3 Years	September 2014
(France)	Rémi Casty	Sydney Roosters	4 Years	September 2014

Out

Nat	Name	Moved To	Contract Length	Date announced
(England)	Leon Pryce	Hull F.C.	2 Years	July 2014
(France)	Michael Simon	Wakefield Trinity Wildcats	2 Years	July 2014
(France)	William Barthau	London Broncos	2 Years	August 2014
(France)	Kevin Larroyer	Hull Kingston Rovers	1 Year Loan	August 2014
(New Zealand)	Brent Webb	Retired	N/A	August 2014
(Tonga)	Lopini Paea	Wakefield Trinity Wildcats	1 Year	August 2014
(France)	Jamal Fakir	Lézignan Sangliers	2 Years	September 2014
(France)	Jean-Philippe Baile	Bradford Bulls	1 Year	September 2014
(Australia)	Sam Williams	Canberra Raiders	2 Years	September 2014
(Fiji)	Daryl Millard	South Sydney Rabbitohs	1 Year	January 2015
(France)	Frédéric Vaccari	Palau Broncos		
