= 2015 Rugby League European Championship =

International rugby league football tournament

- Number of teams: 4
- Host countries: Wales; France; Scotland; Ireland
- Winner: Wales (7th title)
- Matches played: 6
- Attendance: 15,301 (2,550 per match)
- Points scored: 225 (37.5 per match)
- Tries scored: 41 (6.83 per match)
- Top scorer: (Wales) Courtney Davies (22)
- Top try scorer: (France) Tony Gigot (4)

The 2015 Rugby League European Championship was an international rugby league football tournament. The tournament took place between 16 October and 7 November in Wales, France, Scotland and Ireland.

Scotland were the defending champions. Four teams competed in the 2015 event; Wales, Scotland, France and Ireland. Wales won the European Championship after winning all of their games putting them on top of the table with the maximum points tally of 6.

After the tournament's last game there would be no European Championship tournament until the 2018 Championship due to the events occurring such as the 2016 Four Nations, 2017 World Cup qualifying competitions and the 2017 World Cup Finals.

== Teams ==
Team	Coach	Captain	RLIF Rank
France	Richard Agar	Jason Baitieri	5
Ireland	Mark Aston	Liam Finn	7
Scotland	Steve McCormack	Danny Brough	8
Wales	John Kear	Craig Kopczak	9

== Squads ==
=== France ===
Head Coach: (England) Richard Agar

- On 1 October, Richard Agar named the following 23 players as part of his squad in preparation for the tournament.

Player	Games	Points	Position	2015 Club
Morgan Escaré	3	4	FB	(France) Catalans Dragons
Jordan Sigismeau	3	4	WG	(France) AS Saint Estève
Damien Cardace	1	0	WG	(France) Lézignan Sangliers
Jean-Philippe Baile	3	0	CE	(England) Bradford Bulls
Tony Gigot	3	16	CE	(France) Catalans Dragons
Benjamin Jullien	3	0	CE	(England) Warrington Wolves
Olivier Arnaud	2	4	CE	(France) Sporting Olympique Avignon
Théo Fages	2	4	SO	(England) Salford Red Devils
Stanislas Robin	3	8	SO	(France) AS Saint Estève
William Barthau	2	2	SH	(England) London Broncos
Rémy Marginet	2	14	SH	(France) AS Saint Estève
Mourad Kriouache	0	0	SH	(France) Toulouse Olympique
Julian Bousquet	3	0	PR	(France) Catalans Dragons
Mickaël Simon	3	4	PR	(England) Wakefield Trinity Wildcats
Gadwin Springer	3	0	PR	(England) Castleford Tigers
Clément Boyer	1	0	PR	(France) Toulouse Olympique
John Boudebza	3	1	HK	(England) Hull Kingston Rovers
Kevin Larroyer	3	8	SR	(England) Hull Kingston Rovers
Antoni Maria	2	0	SR	(France) Catalans Dragons
Florent Rouanet	1	0	SR	(France) Lézignan Sangliers
Mickaël Goudemand	0	0	SR	(France) Sporting Olympique Avignon
Jason Baitieri (C)	2	0	LF	(France) Catalans Dragons
Ugo Perez	3	4	LF	(France) AS Saint Estève

=== Ireland ===
Head Coach: (England) Mark Aston

- On 2 October, Mark Aston named the following 22 players as part of his squad in preparation for the tournament.
- On 6 November, Robbie Mulhern was a late call-up for Mark Aston's team in the lead up to their crucial final match against Wales.

Player	Games	Points	Position	2015 Club
Scott Grix	3	4	FB	(England) Huddersfield Giants
Callum Mulkeen	3	4	WG	(England) Gloucestershire All Golds
Casey Dunne	3	4	WG	(Ireland) Athboy Longhorns
Bradley Hargreaves	3	8	CE	(England) Rochdale Hornets
James Mendeika	2	0	CE	(England) Bradford Bulls
Liam Finn (C)	3	14	SO	(England) Castleford Tigers
Ben Johnston	3	0	SH	(England) Halifax
Gregg McNally	0	0	SH	(England) Leigh Centurions
Joseph Keyes	3	0	SH	(England) London Broncos
Matty Hadden	3	0	PR	(England) Rochdale Hornets
Sean Hesketh	1	0	PR	(England) Batley Bulldogs
Luke Ambler	3	8	PR	(England) Halifax
Colton Roche	0	0	PR	(England) York City Knights
Gareth Gill	1	0	PR	(Ireland) Ballynahinch Rabbitohs
Danny Bridge	3	0	SR	(England) Rochdale Hornets
Will Hope	3	0	SR	(England) Oldham R.L.F.C.
Elliot Cosgrove	3	0	SR	(England) Batley Bulldogs
Oliver Roberts	3	0	SR	(England) Huddersfield Giants
Haydn Peacock	2	0	SR	(France) AS Carcassonne
Graham O'Keeffe	2	0	SR	(England) Oxford RLFC
Dave Allen	0	0	SR	(England) Whitehaven
Bob Beswick	3	0	LF	(England) Leigh Centurions

=== Scotland ===
Head Coach: (England) Steve McCormack

- On 30 September, Steve McCormack named the following 29 players as part of his squad in preparation for the tournament.
- On 9 October, Steve McCormack brought in two new players to the squad after the withdrawals from seven players: Craig Borthwick, Mitch Stringer, Brett Carter, Jon Molloy, Callum Phillips and Brett Phillips. Billy McConnachie was also suspended for the first two games. The two new players McCormack brought in are: Louis Senter and Joe McLean.
- On 7 November, Sam Brooks was called up to play for Steve McCormack's side in the final game of the tournament against France to fill in for injuries. Gavin Grant was also called up to play in the team, for the game against France, which became the youngest ever international senior Scottish team to play an international match with an average age of 22.

Player	Games	Points	Position	2015 Club
Alex Walker	3	0	FB	(England) London Broncos
Harvey Burnett	3	0	WG	Unattached
Richard Harris	3	0	WG	(England) Warrington Wolves
David Scott	3	4	WG	(England) Doncaster
Craig Robertson	0	0	WG	(Scotland) Edinburgh Eagles
Ben Hellewell	2	0	CE	(England) London Broncos
Shane Toal	2	8	CE	(England) Barrow Raiders
Finlay Hutchison	1	0	CE	(Scotland) Edinburgh Eagles
Scott Plumridge	2	0	CE	(Scotland) Edinburgh Eagles
Danny Brough (C)	2	10	SO	(England) Huddersfield Giants
Oscar Thomas	3	10	SO	(England) London Broncos
Louis Senter	0	0	SH	(Scotland) Easterhouse Panthers
Finn Murphy	0	0	SH	(Scotland) Edinburgh Eagles
Sam Barlow	0	0	PR	(England) Leigh Centurions
Ben Kavanagh	3	0	PR	(England) Widnes Vikings
Adam Walker	1	0	PR	(England) Hull Kingston Rovers
Jonathan Walker	2	0	PR	(England) Leigh Centurions
Joe McLean	3	0	PR	(England) Gloucestershire All Golds
Billy McConnachie	0	0	PR	(Australia) Ipswich Jets
Josh Barlow	0	0	HK	(England) Swinton Lions
Liam Hood	3	4	HK	(England) Salford Red Devils
Lewis Clarke	2	0	HK	(Scotland) Edinburgh Eagles
Sonny Esslemont	3	0	SR	(England) Hull Kingston Rovers
Corbyn Kilday	2	0	SR	(Australia) Central Queensland Capras
Danny Addy	3	8	LF	(England) Bradford Bulls
Dale Ferguson	3	8	LF	(England) Bradford Bulls

=== Wales ===
Head Coach: (England) John Kear

- On 16 September, John's first selection move of 2015 was naming his new captain as Lloyd White.
- On 29 September, John Kear named the following 24 players as part of his squad in preparation for the tournament.
- On 2 October, Matty Fozard pulled out of the squad due to a broken jaw. He was replaced by Connor Farrer.
- On 8 October, James Geurtjens of the Coventry Bears was called up into John Kear's squad.
- On 12 October, captain Lloyd White withdrew from the team due to a knee injury. Craig Kopczak was therefore announced as the new captain.
- On 21 October, Coventry Bears prop Morgan Evans replaced Ben Flower in the team.

Player	Games	Points	Position	2015 Club
Elliot Kear	3	4	FB	(England) London Broncos
Lewis Reece	3	4	FB	(England) Gloucestershire All Golds
Jamie Murphy	1	0	FB	(England) Gloucestershire All Golds
Dalton Grant	3	12	WG	(England) Dewsbury Rams
Rhys Williams	3	0	WG	(England) London Broncos
Michael Channing	3	0	WG	(England) Castleford Tigers
Regan Grace	2	0	WG	(England) St. Helens
Christiaan Roets	3	0	CE	North Wales Crusaders
Rob Massam	0	0	CE	North Wales Crusaders
Courtney Davies	3	22	SO	(England) Gloucestershire All Golds
Steve Parry	3	8	SO	(England) Gloucestershire All Golds
Ollie Olds	3	0	SH	(Australia) Souths Logan Magpies
Joe Burke	3	4	PR	North Wales Crusaders
Dan Fleming	0	0	PR	(England) Bradford Bulls
Craig Kopczak (C)	3	0	PR	(England) Huddersfield Giants
Anthony Walker	3	4	PR	(England) Wakefield Trinity Wildcats
Morgan Evans	2	0	PR	(England) Coventry Bears
James Geurtjens	0	0	PR	(England) Coventry Bears
Philip Joseph	3	0	HK	(England) Widnes Vikings
Connor Farrer	2	0	HK	South Wales Scorpions
Matt Barron	1	0	SR	(England) Newcastle Thunder
Ricky Hough	0	0	SR	(England) Newcastle Thunder
Rhodri Lloyd	3	4	SR	(England) Wigan Warriors
Morgan Knowles	1	0	LF	(England) St. Helens

== Venues ==
The games will be played at the following venues in Wales, France, Scotland and Ireland.

Wrexham	Albi	Galashiels	Cardiff	Avignon	Bray
Racecourse Ground	Stadium Municipal d'Albi	Netherdale	Cardiff Arms Park	Parc des Sports	Carlisle Grounds
Capacity: 15,550	Capacity: 13,058	Capacity: 4,000	Capacity: 12,125	Capacity: 17,518	Capacity: 7,000

== Standings ==
Team	Played	Won	Drew	Lost	For	Ag.	Diff	Points
Wales	3	3	0	0	62	22	+40	6
France	3	2	0	1	69	46	+23	4
Ireland	3	1	0	2	42	83	–41	2
Scotland	3	0	0	3	52	74	–22	0

== Fixtures ==
Note*France vs Wales Round 2 fixture has been moved to the 30th due to France's fixture with England on 24 October before England's series against New Zealand.

=== Round 1 ===
16 October 2015

Wales	18 – 12	Scotland

Racecourse Ground, Wrexham

17 October 2015

France	31 – 14	Ireland

Stadium Municipal d'Albi, Albi

=== Round 2 ===
23 October 2015

Scotland	22 – 24	Ireland

Netherdale, Galashiels

*30 October 2015

Wales	14 – 6	France

Cardiff Arms Park, Cardiff

=== Round 3 ===
7 November 2015

France	32 – 18	Scotland

Parc des Sports, Avignon

7 November 2015

Ireland	4 – 30	Wales

Carlisle Grounds, Bray

== Matches details ==
All times are local: UTC+1/CET in French venues. UTC+0/WET in Irish venues. UTC+0/GMT in Welsh venues. UTC+0/GMT in Scottish venues.

=== Wales vs Scotland ===
16 October 2015
20:00

Wales	18 – 12	Scotland
Try: Parry 9' c Grant 37'; Walker 64' c Goal: Davies (3/5) 10', 15', 65'	Report	Try: Ferguson 27' c Thomas 78' c Goal: Brough (2/2) 28', 80'

Racecourse Ground, Wrexham
Attendance: 1,253
Referee: Joe Cobb

FB	1	Elliot Kear
RW	2	Rhys Williams
RC	3	Michael Channing
LC	4	Christiaan Roets
LW	5	Dalton Grant
SO	7	Ollie Olds
SH	24	Courtney Davies
PR	17	Anthony Walker
HK	18	Steve Parry
PR	10	Craig Kopczak (c)
SR	11	Rhodri Lloyd
SR	14	Lewis Reece
LF	13	Philip Joseph
Substitutions:
IC	12	Morgan Knowles
IC	20	Joe Burke
IC	21	Matty Barron
IC	25	Jamie Murphy
Coach:
John Kear

FB	1	Oscar Thomas
RW	2	David Scott
RC	3	Ben Hellewell
LC	4	Harvey Burnett
LW	5	Alex Walker
SO	6	Danny Brough (c)
SH	7	Danny Addy
PR	8	Adam Walker
HK	9	Liam Hood
PR	10	Jonathan Walker
SR	11	Sonny Esslemont
SR	12	Dale Ferguson
LF	13	Ben Kavanagh
Substitutions:
IC	14	Joe McClean
IC	15	Corbyn Kilday
IC	16	Richard Harris
IC	17	Scott Plumridge
Coach:
Steve McCormack

- The victory for Wales ended their spree of 12 consecutive defeats with their last victory occurring four years ago.

=== France vs Ireland ===
17 October 2015
15:30

France	31 – 14	Ireland
Try: Robin 24'; Sigismeau 30'; Gigot (2) 44' c, 74'; Fages 50' c Larroyer 78' c Goal: Marginet (3/6) 45', 51', 79'; Drop Goal: Boudebza (1/1) 73'	Report	Try: Dunne 19' c Hargreaves 55' c Goal: Finn (3/3) 20', 40', 56'

Stadium Municipal d'Albi, Albi
Attendance: 4,681
Referee: Phil Bentham

FB	1	Morgan Escaré
RW	2	Jordan Sigismeau
RC	3	Tony Gigot
LC	4	Benjamin Jullien
LW	5	Damien Cardace
SO	6	Théo Fages (c)
SH	7	Rémy Marginet
PR	8	Julian Bousquet
HK	9	John Boudebza
PR	10	Mickaël Simon
SR	11	Kevin Larroyer
SR	12	Ugo Perez
LF	13	Gadwin Springer
Substitutes
IC	14	Stanislas Robin
IC	15	Jean-Philippe Baile
IC	16	Antoni Maria
IC	17	Clément Boyer
Coach:
Richard Agar

FB	1	Scott Grix
RW	2	Bradley Hargreaves
RC	3	James Mendeika
LC	4	Elliot Cosgrove
LW	5	Casey Dunne
SO	6	Ben Johnston
SH	7	Liam Finn (c)
PR	8	Danny Bridge
HK	9	Bob Beswick
PR	10	Luke Ambler
SR	11	Haydn Peacock
SR	12	Will Hope
LF	13	Oliver Roberts
Substitutes
IC	14	Joseph Keyes
IC	15	Callum Mulkeen
IC	16	Graham O'Keeffe
IC	17	Matty Hadden
Coach:
Mark Aston

=== Scotland vs Ireland ===
23 October 2015
19:30

Scotland	22 – 24	Ireland
Try: Addy (2) 22', 43' c Toal 47' c Ferguson 60' c Goal: Brough (3/4) 44', 48', 61'	Report	Try: Ambler (2) 7' c, 34' c Hargreaves 13'; Grix 72' c Goal: Finn (4/5) 8', 35', 38', 73'

Netherdale, Galashiels
Attendance: 1,197
Referee: Chris Kendall

FB	1	David Scott
RW	2	Shane Toal
RC	3	Ben Hellewell
LC	4	Richard Harris
LW	5	Alex Walker
SO	6	Danny Brough (c)
SH	7	Oscar Thomas
PR	8	Ben Kavanagh
HK	9	Liam Hood
PR	10	Jonathan Walker
SR	11	Sonny Esslemont
SR	12	Dale Ferguson
LF	13	Danny Addy
Substitutions:
IC	14	Joe McClean
IC	15	Corbyn Kilday
IC	16	Lewis Clarke
IC	17	Harvey Burnett
Coach:
Steve McCormack

FB	1	Scott Grix
RW	2	Bradley Hargreaves
RC	3	James Mendeika
LC	4	Elliot Cosgrove
LW	5	Casey Dunne
SO	6	Ben Johnston
SH	7	Liam Finn (c)
PR	8	Matty Hadden
HK	9	Bob Beswick
PR	10	Luke Ambler
SR	11	Danny Bridge
SR	12	Will Hope
LF	13	Oliver Roberts
Substitutes
IC	14	Callum Mulkeen
IC	15	Graham O'Keeffe
IC	16	Joseph Keyes
IC	17	Sean Hesketh
Coach:
Mark Aston

=== Wales vs France ===
30 October 2015
13:30

Wales	14 – 6	France
Try: Grant 27'; Burke 46' c Davies 51'; Goal: Davies (1/3) 47'	Report	Try: Simon 73' c Goal: Barthau (1/1) 73'

Cardiff Arms Park, Cardiff
Attendance: 1,028
Referee: Robert Hicks

FB	1	Elliot Kear
RW	2	Rhys Williams
RC	3	Michael Channing
LC	4	Christiaan Roets
LW	5	Dalton Grant
SO	7	Ollie Olds
SH	24	Courtney Davies
PR	17	Anthony Walker
HK	18	Steve Parry
PR	10	Craig Kopczak (c)
SR	11	Rhodri Lloyd
SR	14	Lewis Reece
LF	13	Philip Joseph
Substitutions:
IC	8	Morgan Evans
IC	19	Connor Farrer
IC	20	Joe Burke
IC	22	Regan Grace
Coach:
John Kear

FB	1	Morgan Escaré
RW	2	Jordan Sigismeau
RC	3	Tony Gigot
LC	4	Jean-Philippe Baile
LW	5	Olivier Arnaud
SO	6	Théo Fages
SH	7	William Barthau
PR	8	Julian Bousquet
HK	9	John Boudebza
PR	10	Mickaël Simon
SR	11	Kevin Larroyer
SR	12	Ugo Perez
LF	13	Jason Baitieri (c)
Substitutes
IC	14	Stanislas Robin
IC	15	Antoni Maria
IC	16	Gadwin Springer
IC	17	Benjamin Jullien
Coach:
Richard Agar

- With the defeat, France still haven’t won a test in South Wales since 1948.

=== France vs Scotland ===
7 November 2015
15:30

France	32 – 18	Scotland
Try: Arnaud 3'; Gigot (2) 15', 38'; Larroyer 22'; Escaré 26'; Robin 30'; Perez 60'; Goal: Marginet (4/7)	Report	Try: Toal 9' c Scott 66' c Hood 70' c Goal: Thomas (3/3)

Parc des Sports, Avignon
Attendance: 5,737
Referee: Gareth Hewer
Player of the Match: Tony Gigot (France)

FB	1	Morgan Escaré
RW	2	Jordan Sigismeau
RC	3	Tony Gigot
LC	4	Benjamin Jullien
LW	5	Olivier Arnaud
SO	6	Stanislas Robin
SH	7	Rémy Marginet
PR	8	Julian Bousquet
HK	9	John Boudebza
PR	10	Mickaël Simon
SR	11	Kevin Larroyer
SR	12	Ugo Perez
LF	13	Jason Baitieri (c)
Substitutes
IC	14	William Barthau
IC	15	Jean-Philippe Baile
IC	16	Gadwin Springer
IC	17	Florent Rouanet
Coach:
Richard Agar

FB	1	David Scott
RW	2	Shane Toal
RC	3	Harvey Burnett
LC	4	Richard Harris
LW	5	Alex Walker
SO	6	Danny Addy
SH	7	Oscar Thomas
PR	8	Joe McClean
HK	9	Liam Hood
PR	10	Ben Kavanagh
SR	11	Sonny Esslemont
SR	12	Dale Ferguson (c)
LF	13	Sam Brooks
Substitutions:
IC	14	Scott Plumridge
IC	15	Gavin Grant
IC	16	Lewis Clarke
IC	17	Finlay Hutchison
Coach:
Steve McCormack

=== Ireland vs Wales ===
7 November 2015
17:00

Ireland	4 – 30	Wales
Try: Mulkeen 72'; Goal: Finn (0/1)	Report	Try: Grant 7' c Reece 20' c Parry 33' c Lloyd 38'; Kear 57' c Goal: Davies (5/6) 7', 20', 33', 57', 60'

Carlisle Grounds, Bray
Attendance: 1,405
Referee: Ben Thaler

FB	1	Scott Grix
RW	2	Bradley Hargreaves
RC	3	Callum Mulkeen
LC	4	Elliot Cosgrove
LW	5	Casey Dunne
SO	6	Ben Johnston
SH	7	Liam Finn (c)
PR	8	Matty Hadden
HK	9	Bob Beswick
PR	10	Luke Ambler
SR	11	Danny Bridge
SR	12	Will Hope
LF	13	Oliver Roberts
Substitutes
IC	14	Joseph Keyes
IC	15	Robbie Mulhern
IC	16	Haydn Peacock
IC	17	Gareth Gill
Coach:
Mark Aston

FB	1	Elliot Kear
RW	2	Rhys Williams
RC	3	Michael Channing
LC	4	Christiaan Roets
LW	5	Dalton Grant
SO	7	Ollie Olds
SH	24	Courtney Davies
PR	17	Anthony Walker
HK	18	Steve Parry
PR	10	Craig Kopczak (c)
SR	11	Rhodri Lloyd
SR	14	Lewis Reece
LF	13	Philip Joseph
Substitutions:
IC	8	Morgan Evans
IC	19	Connor Farrer
IC	20	Joe Burke
IC	22	Regan Grace
Coach:
John Kear

== Attendances ==
Date	Game	Stadium	Attendance
16 October	Wales 18 – 12 Scotland	Racecourse Ground, Wrexham	1,253
17 October	France 31 – 14 Ireland	Stadium Municipal d'Albi, Albi	4,681
23 October	Scotland 22 – 24 Ireland	Netherdale, Galashiels	1,197
30 October	Wales 14 – 6 France	Cardiff Arms Park, Cardiff	1,028
7 November	France 32 – 18 Scotland	Parc des Sports, Avignon	5,737
7 November	Ireland 4 – 30 Wales	Carlisle Grounds, Bray	1,405

== Broadcasting ==
beIN Sports broadcast both of France's home matches against Ireland and Scotland as well as their away match against Wales.
