= Rhodri Lloyd =

Wales international rugby league footballer

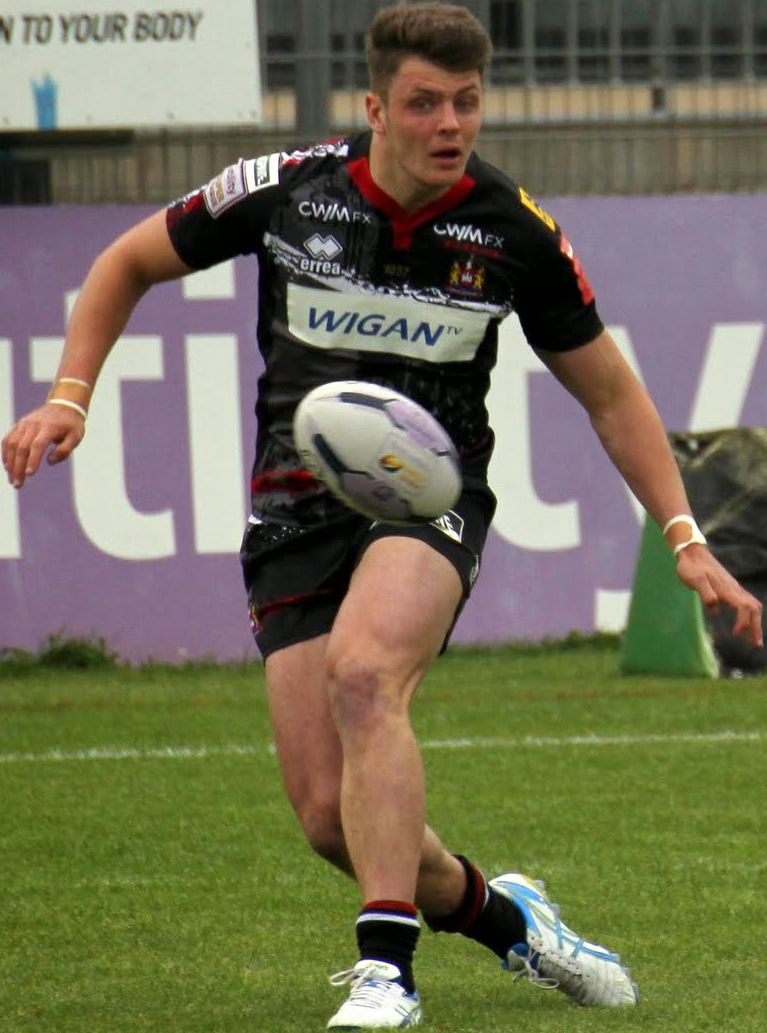

Personal information
- Full name: Rhodri John Lloyd
- Born: 22 July 1993 (age 33) Penpedairheol, Caerphilly, Wales
- Height: 6 ft 3 in (190 cm)
- Weight: 15 st 13 lb (101 kg)

Playing information
- Position: Second-row, Centre
Club
Years	Team	Pld	T	G	FG	P
2011–13	South Wales Scorpions	21	7	0	0	28
2012–15	Wigan Warriors	8	0	0	0	0
2013(loan)	→ Leigh Centurions	3	0	0	0	0
2013(loan)	→ London Broncos	4	1	0	0	4
2014(loan)	→ Widnes Vikings	5	0	0	0	0
2015(loan)	→ Swinton Lions	12	9	0	0	36
2015(loan)	→ Whitehaven	6	1	0	0	4
2015(loan)	→ Workington Town	6	4	0	0	16
2016–23	Swinton Lions	165	49	0	0	196
2024–	Widnes Vikings	25	9	0	0	0
	Total	255	80	0	0	284
Representative
Years	Team	Pld	T	G	FG	P
2010–25	Wales	22	7	1	0	30
- Source: As of 26 October 2025

Rhodri Lloyd (born 22 July 1993) is a Welsh former professional rugby league footballer who played most recently as a second-row forward for the Widnes Vikings in the Championship and Wales at international level.

He played at representative level for Wales, and at club level for the Wigan Warriors and the London Broncos in the Super League.

== Background ==
Lloyd was born in Penpedairheol, Caerphilly, Wales.

He attended Ysgol Gyfun Cwm Rhymni a Welsh language secondary school in Caerphilly county.

He then studied Sports Studies at the University of Central Lancashire, graduating in 2019.

== Club career ==
=== South Wales Scorpions ===
A junior player with South Wales Scorpions, he made his professional debut with them in 2010.

=== Wigan Warriors ===
Lloyd joined Wigan in 2012 and made his Super League début in the same season.

==== loans ====
In January 2014, he joined Widnes on loan.

In February 2015, he joined Swinton on loan.

=== Swinton Lions ===
In February 2016, he signed for Swinton on a permanent basis. Lloyd played in two playoff final victories with the club, in 2015 and 2022, the latter as captain.

=== Widnes Vikings ===
On 28 October 2023 he joined Widnes Vikings on a 2-year deal. In September 2025, Lloyd announced that he was retiring at the end of the 2025 season.

== International career ==
Lloyd made his debut for Wales against Italy in 2010 while just 17 years old. In doing so, he became the youngest ever player to win a senior cap for Wales.

In 2013, Lloyd played in the 2013 Rugby League World Cup. He scored his first ever international try against Italy on the opening day of the tournament. He went on to score another try later on in the tournament.

In October 2015, Lloyd played in the 2015 European Cup. In October 2016, Lloyd played in the 2017 World Cup qualifiers, he also captained the side in a friendly against Jamaica in Wakefield. He was selected in the Wales 9s squad for the 2019 Rugby League World Cup 9s.

On 19 October 2022, Lloyd scored the opening try of Wales 2021 Rugby League World Cup campaign against the Cook Islands. Wales would narrowly lose the match 18-12.

He played his last professional game ever for Wales in the 24-0 win over Ireland, played in Neath on 26 October 2026. Lloyd scored his 7th international try and his only ever goal.
