= Ollie Olds =

Wales international rugby league footballer

Personal information
- Full name: Oliver Olds
- Born: 14 August 1993 (age 32) Bridgend, Wales
- Height: 5 ft 5 in (1.65 m)
- Weight: 11 st 7 lb (73 kg)

Playing information
- Position: Stand-off, Scrum-half
Club
Years	Team	Pld	T	G	FG	P
2012	York City Knights	2	0	0	0	0
2013	South Wales Scorpions	4	1	10	0	24
201?–??	Ipswich Jets
202?–22	Fortitude Valley Diehards
2023–	Swinton Lions	0	0	0	0	0
	Total	6	1	10	0	24
Representative
Years	Team	Pld	T	G	FG	P
2012–	Wales	11	3	0	0	12
- Source: As of 21 December 2022

Ollie Olds (born 14 August 1993) is a Welsh professional rugby league footballer who plays as a stand-off or scrum-half for the Swinton Lions in the RFL Championship and Wales at international level.

== Background ==
Olds was born in Bridgend, Wales.

== Club career ==
A former Wales under-16's international, Olds joined the Leeds Rhinos on trial in 2011, and later joined the club on a permanent basis, becoming the regular scrum-half in their under-20's team. During his time at Leeds Rhinos, Olds played two games for York City Knights on dual registration. Olds then joined the South Wales Scorpions in 2013, before heading to Australia to play for Ipswich Jets.

Following multiple knee and ankle operations, Olds initially retired from the sport in 2020, but was persuaded to come out of retirement by his brother.

== International honours ==
Having represented Wales at junior level, Olds made his début for Wales in a mid-season international against France in 2012. He became one of a select number of players to make his international début before his senior début at club level. Olds played in the 2014 and 2015 European Cup tournaments. Olds scored his first international tries in Wales' first game of the 2017 Rugby League World Cup qualifiers, scoring a double against Serbia. Olds scored a try for Wales in their opening match of the 2021 Rugby League World Cup against the Cook Islands. Wales would narrowly lose the match 18-12.
