= Matty Hadden =

Ireland international rugby league footballer

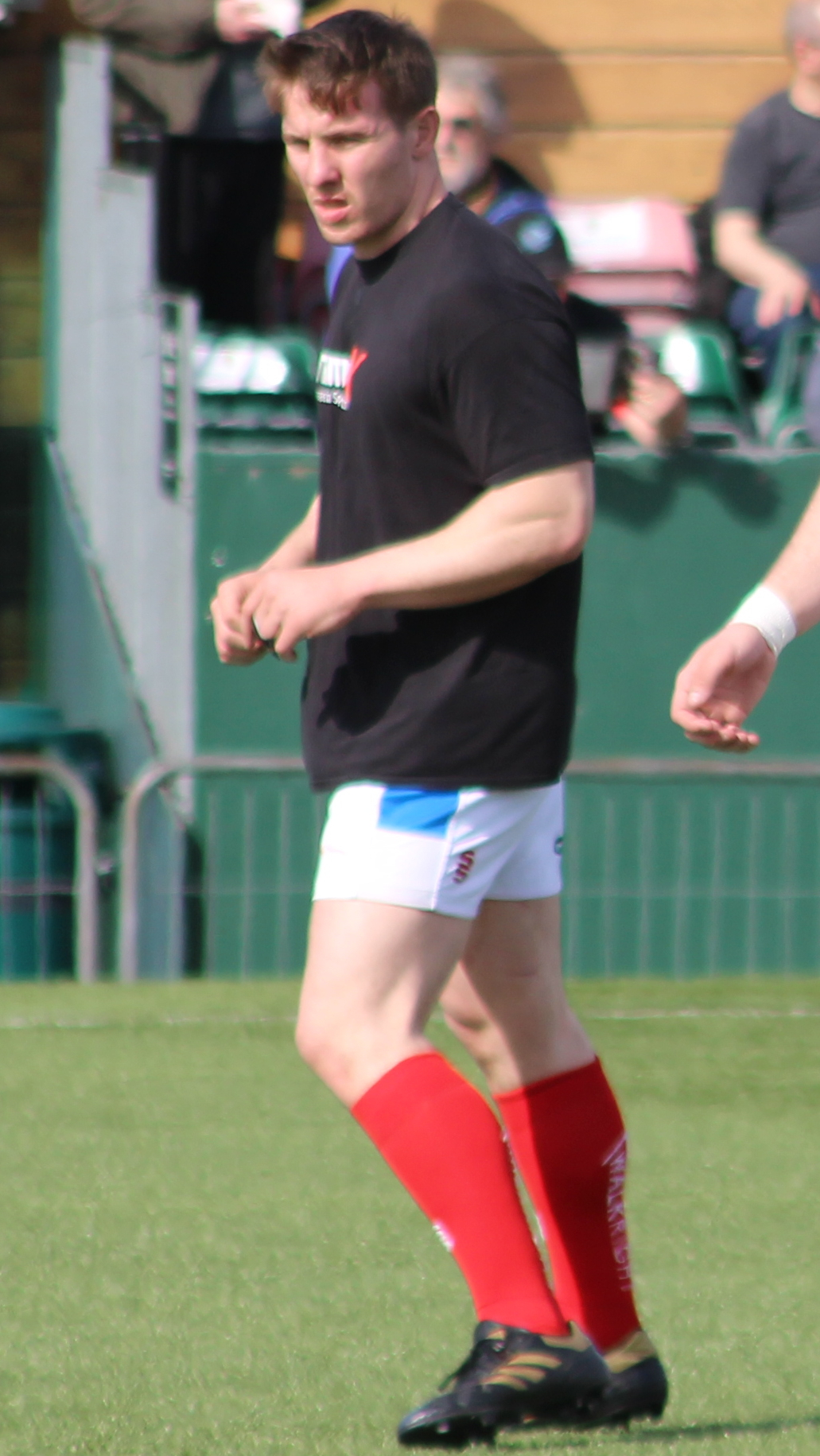

Personal information
- Full name: Matthew Hadden
- Born: 7 June 1990 (age 35) Belfast, Northern Ireland

Playing information
- Position: Prop
Club
Years	Team	Pld	T	G	FG	P
	Antrim Eels
2013–14	Oxford	28	5	0	0	20
2015–18	Rochdale Hornets	80	9	0	0	24
2018–	Longhorns RL	0	0	0	0	0
	Total	108	14	0	0	44
Representative
Years	Team	Pld	T	G	FG	P
2012–17	Ireland	8	0	0	0	0
- Source: As of 21 December 2020 (UTC)

Matthew Hadden (born 7 June 1990) is an Ireland international rugby league footballer who plays as a prop for Longhorn RL in the Ireland National League.

== Playing career ==
=== Longhorns RL ===
On 2 January 2019 Hadden joined Longhorns RL from Rochdale Hornets

=== International ===
He was part of the Ireland squad at the 2013 Rugby League World Cup.

In October and November 2014, Matty played in the European Cup tournament.

In October and November 2015, Matty played in the 2015 European Cup tournament.
