= Morgan Escaré =

France international rugby league footballer

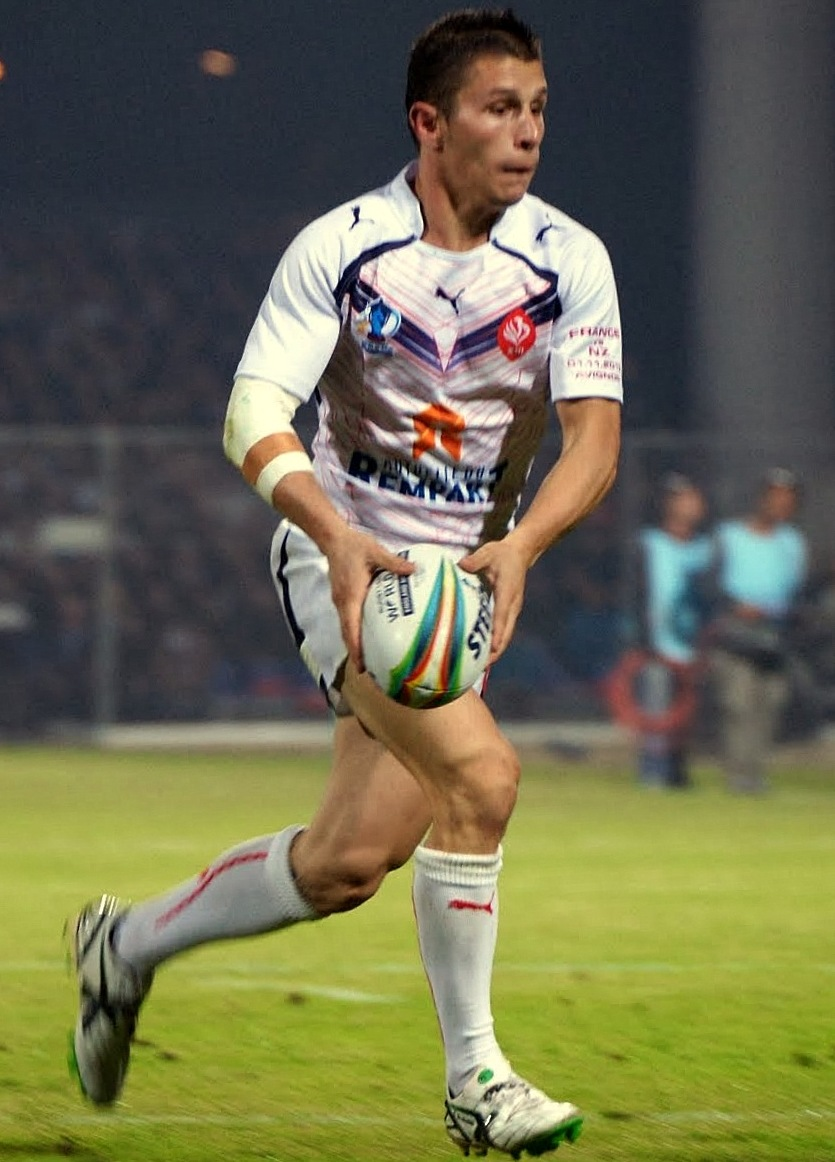

Personal information
- Full name: Morgan Escaré
- Born: 18 October 1991 (age 35) Perpignan, Languedoc-Roussillon, France
- Height: 5 ft 8 in (1.72 m)
- Weight: 11 st 7 lb (73 kg)

Playing information
- Position: Fullback
Club
Years	Team	Pld	T	G	FG	P
2013–16	Catalans Dragons	91	64	1	2	260
2017–20	Wigan Warriors	47	14	41	2	140
2019(loan)	→ Wakefield Trinity	5	1	0	0	4
2021–22	Salford Red Devils	20	8	3	0	38
2022(loan)	→ Wakefield Trinity	2	1	0	0	4
2022(loan)	→ Barrow Raiders	1	1	0	0	4
2022–	AS Carcassonne	40	43	6	0	184
	Total	206	132	51	4	634
Representative
Years	Team	Pld	T	G	FG	P
2013–	France	14	7	9	0	46
- Source: As of 05 March 2024

Morgan Escaré (born 18 October 1991) is a French professional rugby league footballer who plays as a fullback for AS Carcassonne in the Elite One Championship and France at international level.

Escaré previously played for the Salford Red Devils, Catalans Dragons and the Wigan Warriors in the Super League, and has spent time on loan from both Wigan and Salford at Wakefield Trinity in the top flight.

== Background ==
Escare was born in Perpignan, France.

== Club career ==
=== 2013 ===
Following injury to Brent Webb, Escaré made his Super League debut against the Bradford Bulls in Round 8 of Super League XVIII. He enjoyed an eye-catching debut season, scoring 19 tries in 20 games and establishing himself as a first-choice player for the club. He ended the year with selection in the France squad for the 2013 Rugby League World Cup.

=== 2014 ===
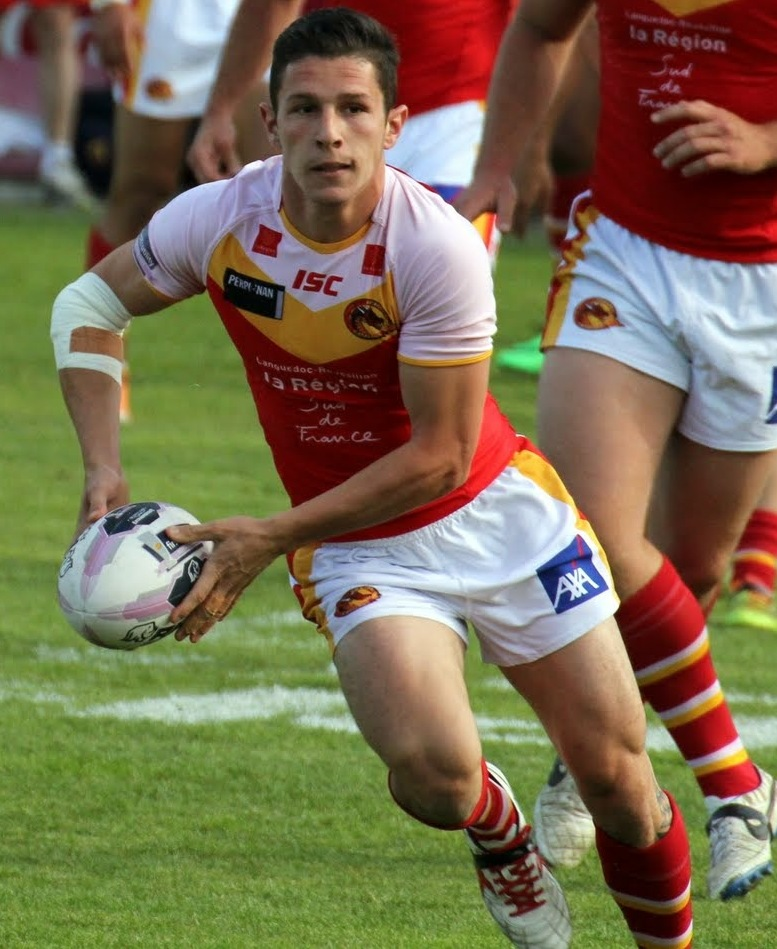
Escaré playing for the Catalans Dragons in 2014

Escaré continued his form in 2014, scoring 28 tries in 31 appearances to finish second to Joel Monaghan in the Super League try-scoring charts, as well as kicking one goal and one drop-goal. He was considered unlucky to miss out on the Super League Dream Team at the end of the season.

=== 2015 ===
Escaré featured in Round 1 (St Helens R.F.C.) to Round 7 (Leeds Rhinos) then in Round 9 (Widnes Vikings) to Round 10 (Wigan Warriors). Escaré also played in Round 12 (Hull Kingston Rovers) to Round 19 (Wakefield Trinity Wildcats). He also featured in Round 21 (Widnes Vikings) to Super Eight 7 (Hull F.C.). Escare featured in the Challenge Cup in Round 6 (Featherstone Rovers) to the Quarter Final (Hull Kingston Rovers). He scored against Castleford Tigers (3 tries), Hull Kingston Rovers (1 try), St Helens R.F.C. (2 tries), Featherstone Rovers (1 try), Wigan Warriors (1 try), Wakefield Trinity Wildcats (1 try), Widnes Vikings (1 try), Huddersfield Giants (1 try) and Leeds Rhinos (1 try).

=== 2016 ===
Escaré missed Rounds 1–7. Morgan featured in Round 8 (Castleford Tigers). He scored against Castleford Tigers (2 tries, 1 drop goal). He made a total of 10 appearances. In October 2016 it was announced that he would be joining Wigan Warriors for the 2017 season.

=== 2017 ===
After finding himself on the fringes of the Catalan squad Escaré secured a release from the last year of his contract to join reigning Super League champions, Wigan Warriors, on a one-year deal as cover for the injured Sam Tomkins. After impressing in pre-season he made his debut against Salford Red Devils and a week later helped Wigan to claim the World Club Challenge title against reigning NRL Premiers Cronulla-Sutherland Sharks. He scored his first try for the club in Round 5 against the Huddersfield Giants before scoring two more in Round 8 against the Castleford Tigers. A week later in the traditional Good Friday Derby against St Helens he scored 9 points from the boot and went home with the Man of the Match award before announcing after the game that he had signed a new three-year contract after impressing the staff at Wigan. He scored his fourth try of the season against Wakefield on Easter Monday. In his thirteenth game for Wigan, away at Castleford, he suffered a season ending knee injury.

=== 2018 ===
With the departure of Michael McIlorum in the offseason, Thomas Leulaui moved into hooker, Sam Powell moved to halfback and with Sam Tomkins as resident fullback, Escaré started the season on the bench. This meant that, when he came on in place of Leulaui, Powell would move to hooker with either Tomkins or Escaré moving to halfback. The other would then run at fullback however both players would change positions as the game progressed. This fluid style of play contributed to a more expansive game from the Wigan side and Escaré profited from that scoring a fabulous try in the first game of the season away at Salford.

He played in the 2018 Super League Grand Final victory over the Warrington Wolves at Old Trafford.

=== 2020 ===
On 11 July 2020, it was announced that Escaré would join Salford for the 2021 season on a three-year deal, to replace the departure of Niall Evalds to Castleford Tigers.

=== 2021 ===
In round 8 of the 2021 Super League season, he was sent to the sin bin for a dangerous high tackle during Salford's 62-18 loss against Warrington. He played a total of 14 games for Salford in the 2021 season scoring seven tries.

=== 2022 ===
Escaré was limited to only six appearances for Salford in the 2022 Super League season. On 23 June, he was ruled out for the remainder of their campaign with a broken thumb.

On 1 November 2022, It was announced that Escare had left Salford, to return home to France.

=== Career stats ===
Season	Appearance	Tries	Goals	F/G	Points
2013	20	19	-	-	76
2014	32	29	1	1	119
2015	29	12	-	-	48
2016	10	5	-	1	21
2017	13	4	33	1	83
Total	91	65	1	2	264

== International career ==
=== 2013 ===
Escaré was selected in France's 2013 Rugby League World Cup squad. He featured in the 22–18 warm up defeat by the USA. Morgan featured in the group games against Papua New Guinea, New Zealand and Samoa. Escaré also featured in the Quarter Final against England. He scored against Samoa (1 try).

=== 2014 ===
Escaré was initially selected in France's 2014 European Cup squad on 3 October but he had to withdraw four days later for medical reasons, making him unable to deliver his career best 2014 club form to the international level.

=== 2015 ===
Escaré was selected in France's 2015 European Cup squad. He featured in the opening match against Ireland and then against Scotland. He also played for France in their mid-tournament test-match against England. He was a part what was considered a 'weakened' French side due to injury and it showed with an appalling showing against their opponents. He scored in the European Cup game against Scotland (1 try).
