= Joe Burke (rugby league) =

Wales international rugby league footballer

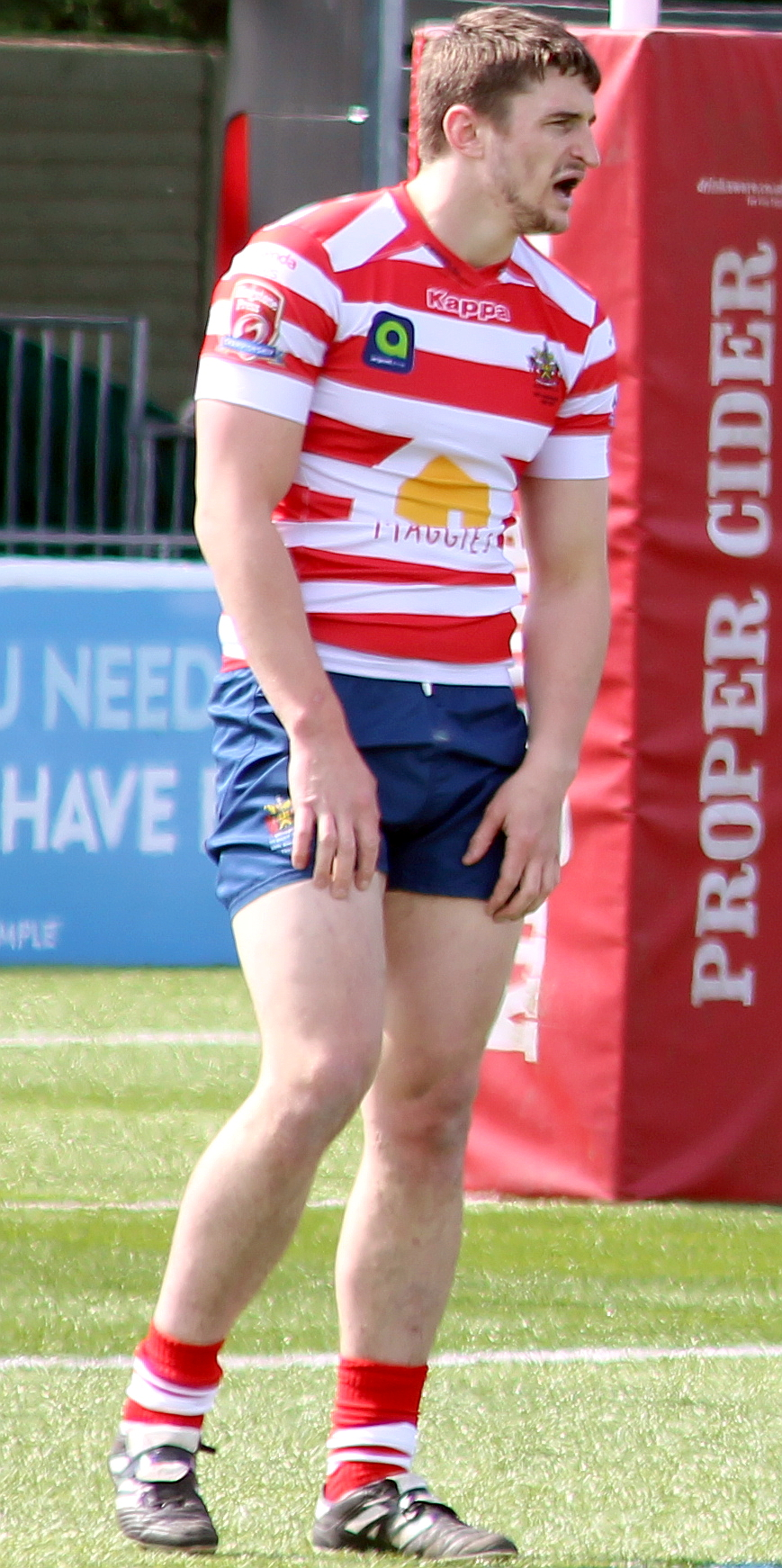

Personal information
- Full name: Joseph Burke
- Born: 18 May 1990 (age 35); Newport, Wales
- Height: 6 ft 4 in (1.93 m)
- Weight: 16 st 7 lb (105 kg)

Playing information
- Position: Prop
Club
Years	Team	Pld	T	G	FG	P
2010–13	South Wales Scorpions	71	7	0	0	28
2011(loan)	→ Crusaders RL	1	0	0	0	0
2014	Barrow Raiders	20	1	0	0	4
2015–16	North Wales Crusaders	31	6	0	0	24
2016–18	Oldham	33	2	0	0	8
2018–	West Wales Raiders	34	1	0	0	4
	Total	190	17	0	0	68
Representative
Years	Team	Pld	T	G	FG	P
2012–	Wales	16	1	0	0	4
- Source: As of 4 November 2022

Joseph Burke (born 18 May 1990) is a Welsh professional rugby league footballer who plays as a prop for the West Wales Raiders in Betfred League 1 and Wales at international level.

== Club career ==
He previously played for Oldham, South Wales Scorpions, Barrow and North Wales Crusaders, and played one game for Crusaders RL in the Super League while on loan at the club in 2011. He has also played for Wales at representative level.

== International ==
In October and November 2014, Joe played in the 2014 European Cup competition.

In October and November 2015, Joe played in the 2015 European Cup competition.

In October 2016, Joe played in the 2017 World Cup qualifiers.
