= Danny Bridge =

Ireland international rugby league footballer

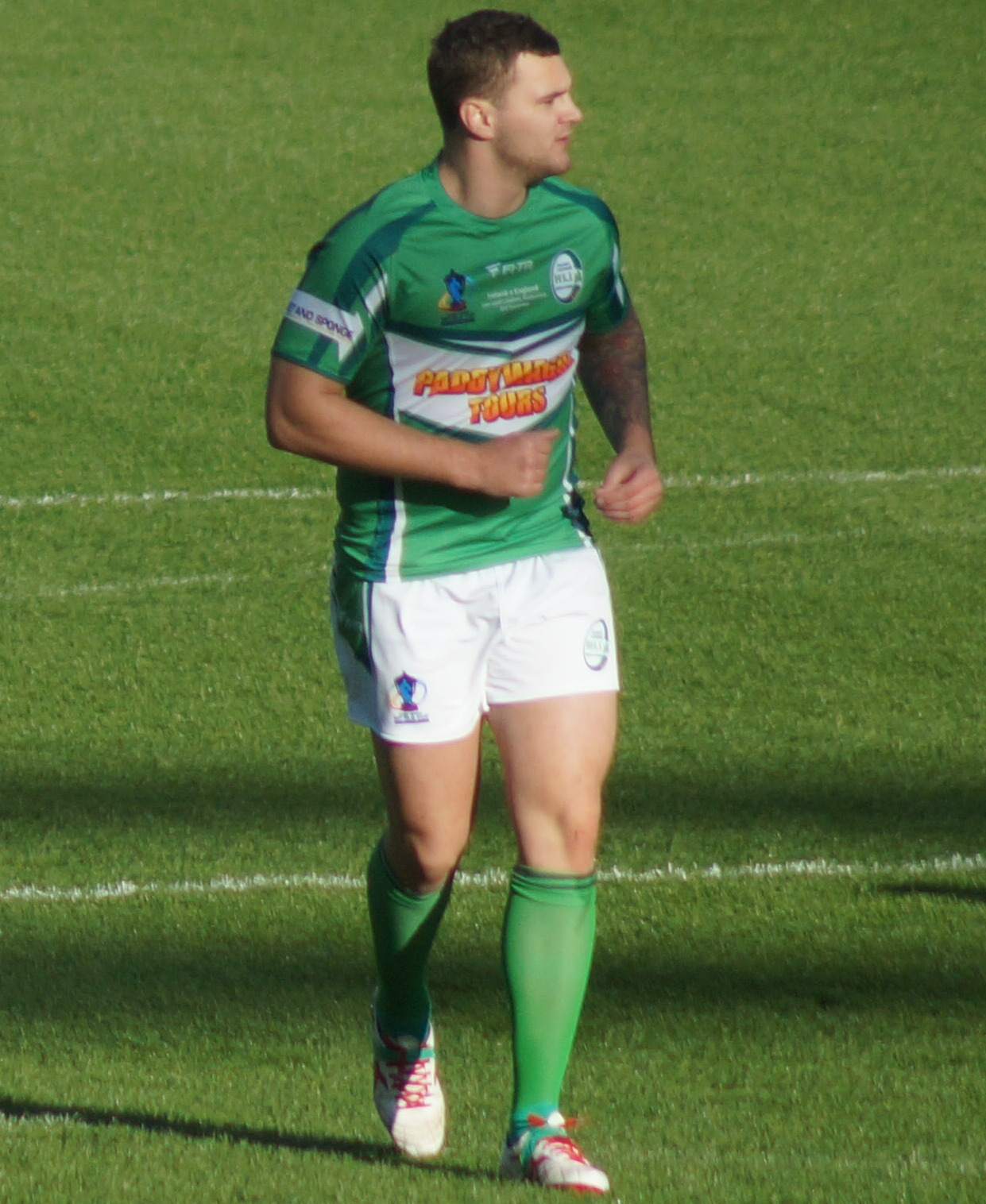

Personal information
- Full name: Daniel Bridge
- Born: 4 January 1993 (age 33) Oldham, Greater Manchester, England
- Height: 6 ft 2 in (1.88 m)
- Weight: 15 st 13 lb (101 kg)

Playing information
- Position: Second-row
Club
Years	Team	Pld	T	G	FG	P
2013–14	Warrington Wolves	3	0	0	0	0
2013(loan)	→ Swinton Lions	13	0	0	0	0
2014(loan)	→ Bradford Bulls	8	0	0	0	0
2014(loan)	→ Featherstone Rovers	4	2	0	0	8
2014(loan)	→ Swinton Lions	8	1	0	0	4
2015–16	Rochdale Hornets	23	15	0	0	60
2017	Rochdale Hornets	7	2	0	0	8
2018–21	Oldham	13	9	0	0	36
	Total	79	29	0	0	116
Representative
Years	Team	Pld	T	G	FG	P
2012–15	Ireland	4	0	0	0	0
- Source: As of 20 September 2026
- Relatives: Chris Bridge (brother)

Danny Bridge (born 4 January 1993) is an Ireland international rugby league footballer who last played for Oldham in League 1.

== Background ==
Bridge was born in Oldham, Greater Manchester, England.

He is the younger brother of Chris Bridge.

He was suspended from playing in 2020 after testing positive for cocaine, however it was reported on 14 Jan 2021 that his ban had been reduced due to a WADA rule change.

== Club career ==
Bridge started his career at Waterhead before joining Wigan Warriors in 2009. He played for the club's academy sides, but left the club in July 2011 when he was signed by Warrington Wolves for an undisclosed fee.

== Loan at Bradford ==
Bridge was loaned to the Bradford Bulls at the start of the 2014 season for a month. He re-signed for another month once his current loan deal expired. During April he signed on a season long loan for Bradford.

He featured in Round 1 (Castleford Tigers) to Round 7 (Widnes Vikings). Bridge then featured in Round 9 (Leeds Rhinos).

On 23 April, Bridge was 'recalled' back to his home-town club Warrington.

== International career ==
Bridge represented England at under-15 and under-18 level. He was part of the Ireland squad at the 2013 Rugby League World Cup.

Bridge represented Ireland at the 2015 European Cup.

In 2016 he was called up to the Ireland squad for the 2017 Rugby League World Cup European Pool B qualifiers.
