= Morgan Evans (rugby league) =

Wales international rugby league player

Personal information
- Full name: Morgan Luc Evans
- Born: 23 March 1992 (age 34) Caerphilly
- Height: 190 cm (6 ft 3 in)
- Weight: 108 kg (17 st 0 lb)

Playing information
- Position: Prop
Club
Years	Team	Pld	T	G	FG	P
2014–15	South Wales Scorpions	8	0	0	0	0
2015	Coventry Bears	3	0	0	0	0
2016	Gloucestershire All Golds	23	2	0	0	8
2017–18	West Wales Raiders	27	3	0	0	12
2019–	West Wales Raiders	13	3	0	0	12
	Total	74	8	0	0	32
Representative
Years	Team	Pld	T	G	FG	P
2014–15	Wales	5	0	0	0	0
- Source: As of 18 July 2019

Morgan Luc Evans (born 23 March 1992) is a Welsh rugby league footballer who plays for the West Wales Raiders in League 1. He began his career playing with his university rugby league team and made his début with the Wales national rugby league team, in 2014 in a charity match against the Keighley Cougars. In 2015, he played prop during Wales's successful European Cup campaign. As well as the West Wales Raiders, he has also played for the clubs Gloucestershire All Golds, South Wales Scorpions and Coventry Bears.

== Life and career ==
Evans was born in Caerphilly on 23 March 1992, and studied at Ysgol Gyfun Cwm Rhymni until 2010. He began playing rugby after commencing a master's degree in mathematics at the University of Bath in 2011, and joined the university's team, the University of Bath Broncos, as a prop. He toured South Africa with other British student players in 2014, before joining the South Wales Scorpions for their 2013/14 season. Evans moved on to the Coventry Bears for the 2014/15 season, and was called up by Wales coach John Kear in October 2014, making his début in a charity match against the Keighley Cougars in honour of the rugby league footballer Danny Jones.

In June 2015, Evans graduated from Bath with a first-class master's degree in mathematics; that October, he was called up again by Wales to replace Ben Flower in the 2015 European Cup. Wales went on to win the cup, their first European title in five years. Evans subsequently signed with the Gloucestershire All Golds in November, and took a coaching role with the University of Bath Broncos.

== See also ==
- Pietro Boselli
