= Joe McClean (rugby league) =

Scotland international rugby league footballer

Personal information
- Full name: Joseph Henry McClean
- Born: 10 August 1989 (age 35); Marlborough, Wiltshire, England

Playing information
- Position: Prop, Second-row
Club
| Years | Team | Pld | T | G | FG | P |
|---|---|---|---|---|---|---|
| 2013–17 | Gloucestershire All Golds | 84 | 19 | 0 | 0 | 76 |
| 2018–20 | West Wales Raiders | 10 | 2 | 0 | 0 | 8 |
| 2021– | Hunslet R.L.F.C. | 0 | 0 | 0 | 0 | 0 |
| | Total | 94 | 21 | 0 | 0 | 84 |
Representative
| Years | Team | Pld | T | G | FG | P |
| 2014–19 | Scotland | 6 | 0 | 0 | 0 | 0 |
- Source: As of 3 March 2021

Joseph Henry McClean (10 August 1989) is a Programme Development Manager at Prospect Training Services, and a professional rugby league footballer who has played in the 2010s. He has played at representative level for Scotland, and at club level for Gloucestershire All Golds, as a prop or second-row.

== Background ==
McLean was born in Marlborough, Wiltshire, England.

== Club career ==
=== Hunslet R.L.F.C. ===
On 3 Mar 2021 it was reported that he had signed for Hunslet R.L.F.C. in the RFL League 1.

== International honours ==
Joe McClean represented Scotland while at Gloucestershire All Golds; he was an interchange/substitute in the 25-4 victory over Ireland in the 2014 European Cup at Tallaght Stadium, Dublin on Saturday 25 October 2014, was an interchange/substitute in the 12-18 defeat by Wales in the 2015 European Cup at Racecourse Ground, Wrexham on Friday 16 October 2015, was an interchange/substitute in the 22-24 defeat by Ireland in the 2015 European Cup at Netherdale, Galashiels on Friday 23 October 2015, and played at prop in the 18-32 defeat by France in the 2015 European Cup at Parc des Sports, Avignon on Saturday 7 November 2015.
