= Harvey Burnett =

Scotland international rugby league footballer (1995–2024)

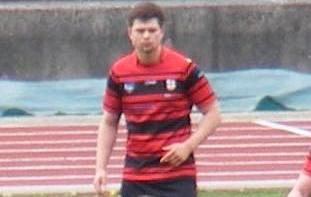
- Burnett in 2015

Personal information
- Full name: Harvey Douglas Burnett
- Born: 18 August 1995 Kingston-upon-Thames, Surrey, England
- Died: 11 November 2024 (aged 29)

Playing information
- Height: 6 ft 4 in (1.93 m)
- Weight: 13 st 5 lb (85 kg)

Rugby league
- Position: Second-row, Centre, Wing
Club
Years	Team	Pld	T	G	FG	P
2015	London Broncos	1	0	0	0	0
2015(loan)	→ London Skolars	9	2	0	0	8
2016–17	Oxford	43	7	26	0	80
2018	Bradford Bulls	0	0	0	0	0
2019	Dewsbury Rams	0	0	0	0	0
	Total	53	9	26	0	88
Representative
Years	Team	Pld	T	G	FG	P
2014–15	Scotland	4	0	0	0	0

Rugby union
Club
Years	Team	Pld	T	G	FG	P
2015–16	Esher

Harvey Burnett (18 August 1995 – 11 November 2024) was a Scotland international professional rugby league footballer who played wing, centre or second-row. He started at London Broncos, made the majority of his appearances for Oxford Rugby League and finished his career at the Dewsbury Rams in the Championship after suffering serious illness at the age of 23.

== Background ==
Burnett was born in Kingston-upon-Thames, Surrey, England on 18 August 1995. He died from cancer on 11 November 2024, at the age of 29.

== Career ==
Harvey Burnett started playing Rugby League at the age of 7, circa 2002, and signed as a junior for the Elmbridge Eagles, before being recruited into the London Broncos Academy system where he was Captain during the era Phil Jones, now the RFL's National Player Development Manager was in charge.

Burnett turned professional at the age of 16 and made his Scotland début in 2014 against France. before he played for the Broncos in the first team.

In his formative years Burnett did not play first team under Powell or Rea but the appointment of Grima in 2014 saw Burnett given a new contract for the 2015 season.

However Grima resigned early on in the season and Andrew Henderson was placed in charge, and he fielded Burnett for his Challenge Cup début for the Broncos away against the Leigh Centurions. however that was it for him and first team level and he was released in July 2015.

Burnett spent time on loan at the London Skolars in 2015.

Midway through the 2015 season, Burnett switched codes to play rugby union.

In 2016, Burnett returned to rugby league and joined Oxford in RFL League 1.

In 2018, Burnett joined Bradford Bulls on a one-year contract, but was released due to work commitments without making any first team appearances as he was employed by Individual Restaurants at that time.

He then signed for Dewsbury Rams ahead of the 2019 season.

It was during his time at Dewsbury that Burnett was diagnosed with Small Round Cell Desmoplastic sarcoma, a type of cancer.
