= Shane Toal =

Scotland international rugby league footballer

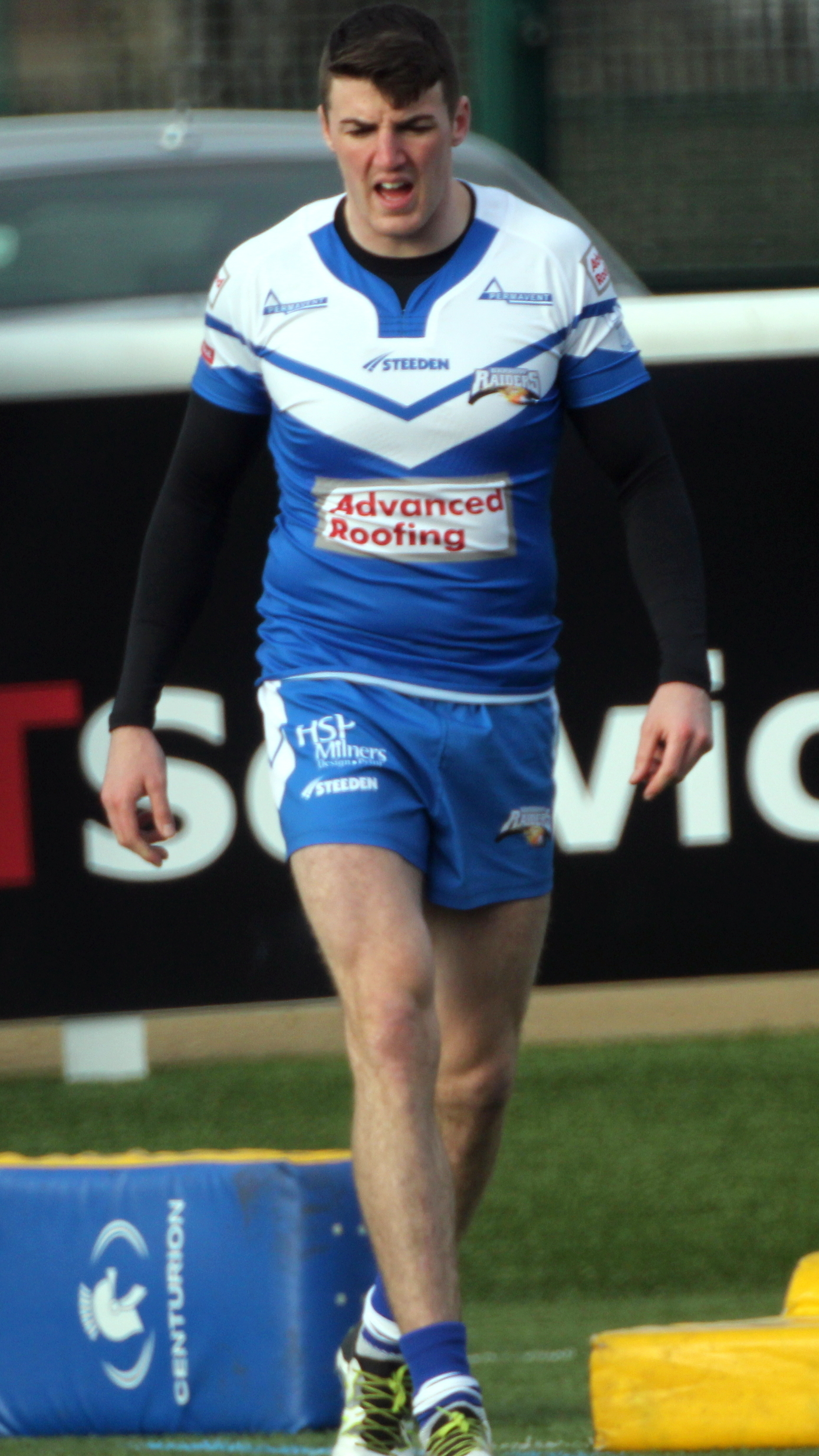

Personal information
- Born: 11 November 1995 (age 30) Barrow-In-Furness, England
- Height: 6 ft 1 in (1.86 m)
- Weight: 15 st 6 lb (98 kg)

Playing information
- Position: Wing, Centre
Club
| Years | Team | Pld | T | G | FG | P |
|---|---|---|---|---|---|---|
| 2015– | Barrow Raiders | 119 | 43 | 1 | 1 | 174 |
Representative
| Years | Team | Pld | T | G | FG | P |
| 2015– | Scotland | 3 | 2 | 0 | 0 | 8 |
| 2025 | Cumbria | 0 | 0 | 0 | 0 | 0 |
- Source: As of 31 October 2025

Shane Toal (born 11 November 1995) is a Scotland semi-professional rugby league footballer who plays on the wing or as a centre for the Barrow Raiders in the Championship.

He was born in Barrow-In-Furness, Cumbria, England, and he is the younger brother of Daniel Toal.

Toal made his début for Scotland in 2015 against France. He was named in Scotland's 2017 Rugby League World Cup squad.
