= Olivier Arnaud =

France international rugby league footballer

Personal information
- Born: 14 October 1987 (age 38) France
- Height: 1.82 m (6 ft 0 in)
- Weight: 86 kg (13 st 8 lb)

Playing information
- Position: Wing, Centre
Club
Years	Team	Pld	T	G	FG	P
2008–	SO Avignon	203	94	518	4	1596
Representative
Years	Team	Pld	T	G	FG	P
2015–	France	3	1	0	0	4
- Source: As of 19 January 2021

Olivier Arnaud (born 14 October 1987) is a French rugby league player who has played for France.

== Playing career ==
Arnaud plays for Sporting Olympique Avignon and made his debut for France in 2015 against Wales.

Arnaud was named in the French squad for the 2017 Rugby League World Cup.
