= Lucas Albert =

France international rugby league footballer

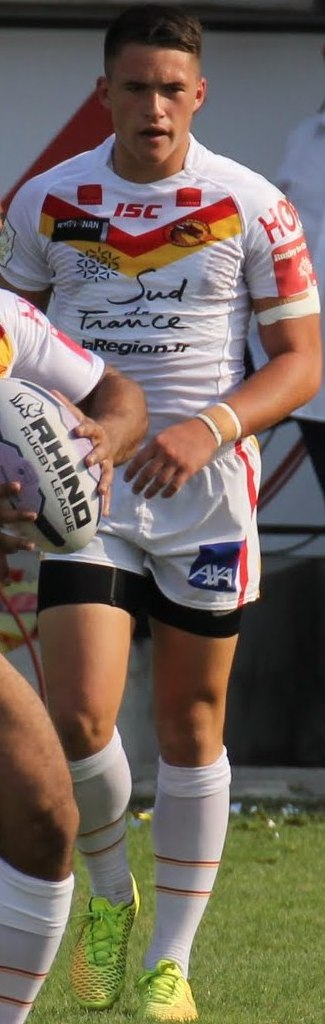

Personal information
- Born: 4 July 1998 (age 28) Carcassonne, France
- Height: 5 ft 10 in (1.77 m)
- Weight: 13 st 1 lb (83 kg)

Playing information
- Position: Scrum-half, Hooker
Club
Years	Team	Pld	T	G	FG	P
2015–20	Catalans Dragons	56	8	28	0	88
2016–20	→ Saint-Esteve	15	4	30	3	79
2021	AS Carcassonne	3	1	0	0	4
2021–23	Toulouse Olympique	22	1	0	0	4
2023–	AS Carcassonne	0	0	0	0	0
	Total	96	14	58	3	175
Representative
Years	Team	Pld	T	G	FG	P
2017–	France	5	0	3	0	6
2019–	France 9s	3	0	0	0	0
- Source: As of 1 July 2023

Lucas Albert (born 4 July 1998) is a French rugby league footballer who plays as a scrum-half or stand-off for AS Carcassonne in the Elite One Championship and France at international level.

Albert has previously played for the Catalans Dragons in the Super League, and spent time from Catalans on loan at Saint-Esteve in the Elite One Championship. He has also played for AS Carcassonne in the Elite One Championship.

== Background ==
Albert was born in Carcassonne, France.

== Club career ==
=== Catalans Dragons ===
Albert debuted for the Catalans Dragons against the Widnes Vikings in July 2015.

=== AS Carcassonne ===
On 17 Nov 2020 it was reported that he had signed for AS Carcassonne in the Elite One Championship.

=== Toulouse Olympique ===
On 28 April 2021, it was announced that Albert would join Toulouse Olympique in the Championship for the remainder of the 2021 season. Due to an injury sustained playing for Carcassonne, Albert did not join Toulouse until July. He made his debut in the final match of the regular season in the 82–12 victory at Newcastle Thunder. He did not play in either of the two play-off matches that saw Toulouse promoted to Super League.

On 22 October 2021, Toulouse announced that Albert had signed a new two-year contract with the Super League club until the end of the 2023 season. Albert played 21 games for Toulouse in the 2022 Super League season as they finished bottom of the table and were relegated back to the RFL Championship.

== International career ==
He was selected in France 9s squad for the 2019 Rugby League World Cup 9s.
