= Fouad Yaha =

France international rugby league & rugby union footballer

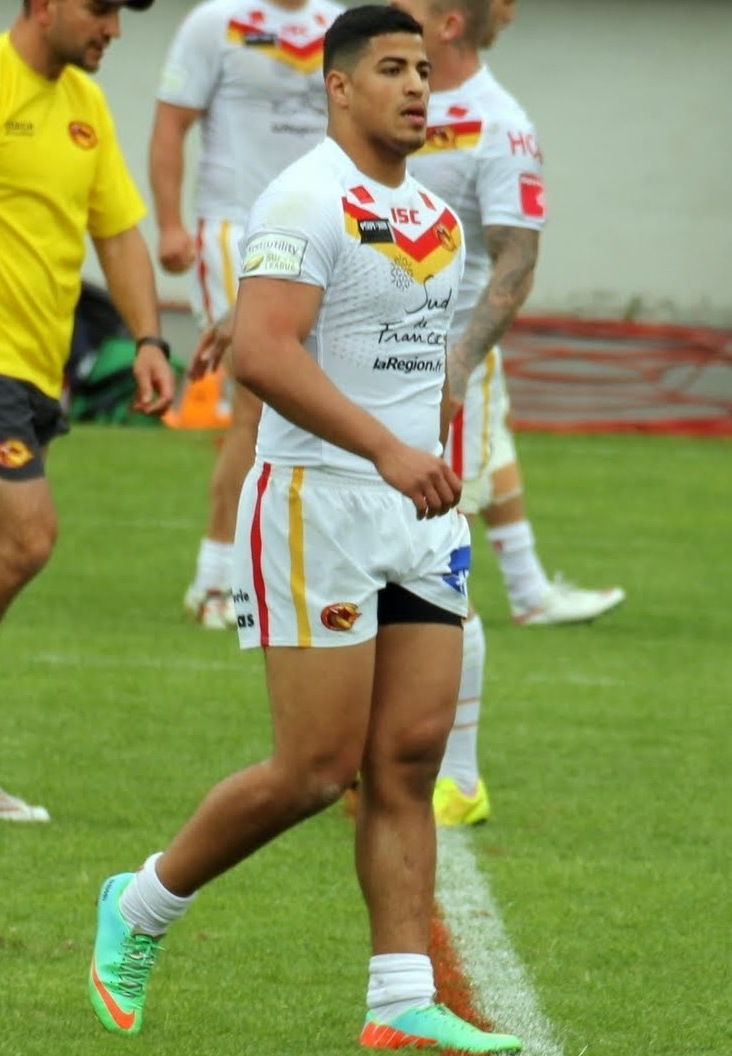

Personal information
- Full name: Fouad Yaha فؤاد يحيى
- Born: 19 August 1996 (age 30) Avignon, Vaucluse, Provence-Alpes-Côte d'Azur, France
- Height: 6 ft 1 in (1.85 m)
- Weight: 14 st 13 lb (95 kg)

Playing information
- Position: Wing
Club
Years	Team	Pld	T	G	FG	P
2015–18	Catalans Dragons	70	35	0	0	140
2019–25	Catalans Dragons	107	73	0	0	292
2023(loan)	→ Hull Kingston Rovers	2	0	0	0	0
2025–	Albi	19	18	0	0	72
	Total	198	126	0	0	504
Representative
Years	Team	Pld	T	G	FG	P
2017–	France	15	4	0	0	16

Rugby union career
- Position: Wing
Senior career
Years	Team	Apps	(Points)
2018-19	SU Agen	4	(10)

Fouad Yaha (born 19 August 1996) is a French professional rugby league footballer who plays as a winger for Albi in the Super XIII and France at international level.

He is the Catalans Dragons current all-time top try scorer, having played for the Dragons in the Super League in two spells between 2015-2018 and 2019-2025. He has also featured for Hull KR on loan.

Yaha briefly played rugby union for SU Agen before returning to Catalans in 2019.

== Background ==
Yaha was born in Avignon, Provence-Alpes-Côte d'Azur, France. He is of Moroccan descent.

== Club career ==
=== Catalans Dragons ===
Yaha made his Super League debut for Catalans Dragons in a 32–24 victory over Hull Kingston Rovers in 2015. At 18 years old, he became the youngest player at the time to have played for the Dragons in Super League.

Yaha was a member of the Catalans team that won the 2018 Challenge Cup Final with victory over the Warrington Wolves at Wembley Stadium.

In round 3 of the 2021 Super League season, he scored a hat-trick in Catalans 42–6 victory over Salford. On 9 October 2021, Yaha played for Catalans in their 2021 Super League Grand Final defeat against St. Helens. In round 22 of the 2022 Super League season, Yaha scored a hat-trick in Catalans 20-16 victory over Wakefield Trinity. In round 25 of the 2022 Super League season, Yaha scored a hat-trick in Catalans 24-14 French Derby victory over Toulouse Olympique. The result also meant Toulouse were relegated back to the Championship.

=== Racing Club Albi XIII ===
On 25 September 2025 it was reported that he had signed for Albi in the Super XIII

=== International ===
On 1 October 2026 he was named in the 2026 France World Cup squad

== Rugby union ==
At the end of the 2018 Super League season, Yaha joined Top 14 rugby union club SU Agen, however he returned to rugby league with the Dragons in February 2019.

== Personal life ==
Yaha is the nephew of former France international Bagdad Yaha, who played in the inaugural season of Super League for Paris Saint-Germain.
