= Jordan Sigismeau =

France international rugby league footballer (born 1992)

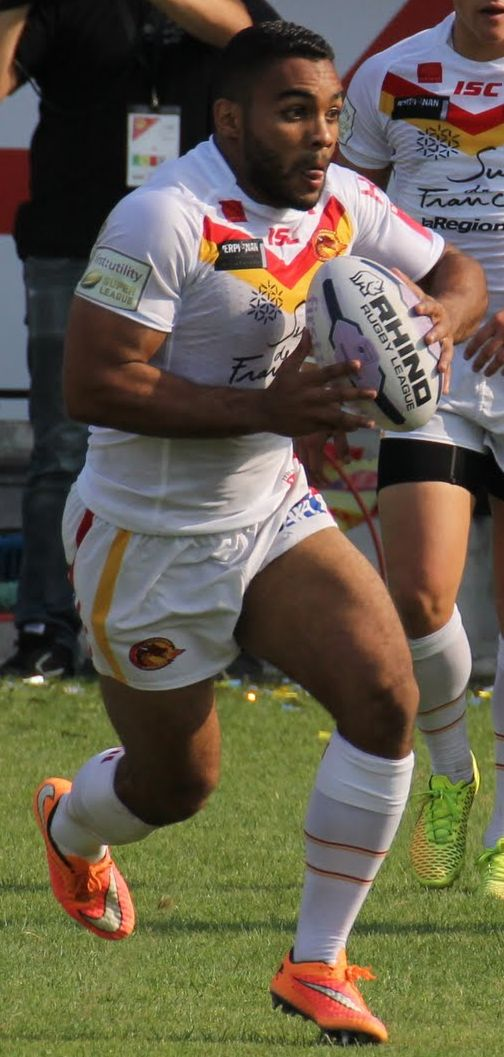

Personal information
- Born: 22 December 1992 (age 33) Réunion
- Height: 1.76 m (5 ft 9 in)
- Weight: 90 kg (14 st 2 lb)

Playing information
- Position: Wing
Club
Years	Team	Pld	T	G	FG	P
2014–17	Saint-Esteve XIII Catalan	30	23	0	0	92
2015–15	Whitehaven	6	2	0	0	8
2015–17	Catalans Dragons	9	4	0	0	16
2016–17	AS Carcassonne	8	4	0	0	16
2017–	Palau Broncos	10	4	0	0	16
	Total	63	37	0	0	148
Representative
Years	Team	Pld	T	G	FG	P
2015	France	4	2	0	0	8
- Source: As of 17 February 2018

Jordan Sigismeau (born 22 December 1992) is a French rugby league footballer who plays for the Palau XIII Broncos in the Elite One Championship He plays as a wing.

== Club career ==
Born on the island of Réunion, Sigismeau originally played rugby union before switching to rugby league with Catalans in 2014. In 2015, he spent time on loan in the Championship with Whitehaven, making 6 appearances before being recalled by Catalans. Sigismeau made his Super League début later that year against Widnes Vikings.

== International career ==
Jordan was selected for France for their 2015 European Cup campaign. He made his international début against Ireland in Albi in a game where the French won comfortably and which also saw Jordan score his first international try.

He also played for France in their mid-tournament test-match against England. He was a part what was considered a 'weakened' French side due to injury and it showed with an appalling showing against their opponents.
