= Gadwin Springer =

France international rugby league footballer

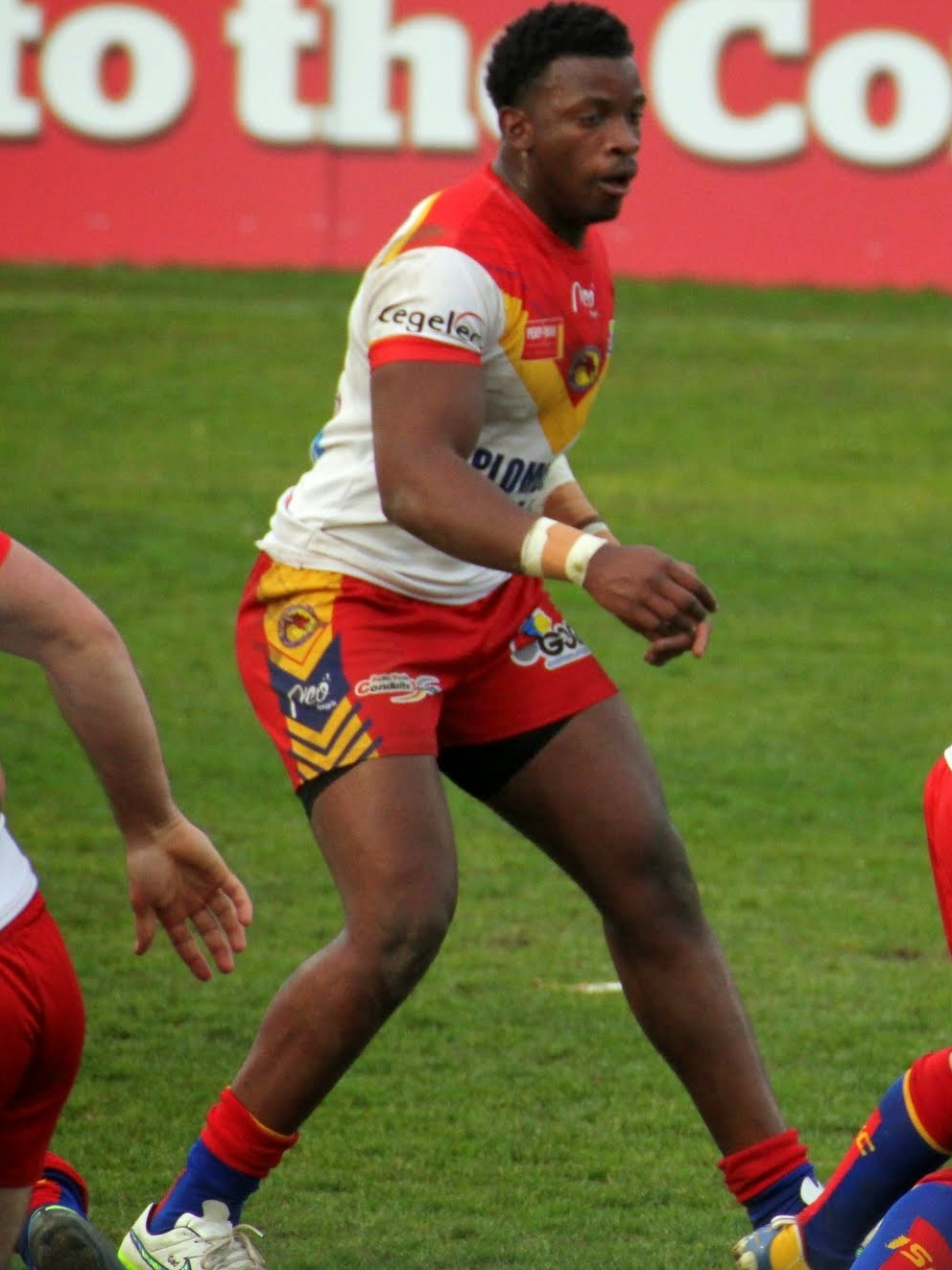

Personal information
- Born: 4 April 1993 (age 33) Cayenne, French Guiana, France
- Height: 6 ft 2 in (188 cm)
- Weight: 19 st 7 lb (124 kg)

Playing information
- Position: Prop
Club
Years	Team	Pld	T	G	FG	P
2014–15	Catalans Dragons	4	1	0	0	2
2015–18	Castleford Tigers	58	3	0	0	12
2018(loan)	→ Halifax	1	0	0	0	0
2019–20	Toronto Wolfpack	18	0	0	0	0
2021	Halifax Panthers	11	1	0	0	4
2021	Featherstone Rovers	7	1	0	0	4
2021	Villeneuve Leopards	0	0	0	0	0
2022	Toulouse Olympique	5	0	0	0	0
2022–25	Featherstone Rovers	11	3	0	0	12
2026	Doncaster RLFC	10	1	0	0	4
2026 (loan)	→ Hunslet RLFC	1	0	0	0	0
	Total	126	10	0	0	38
Representative
Years	Team	Pld	T	G	FG	P
2015–	France	7	0	0	0	0
- Source: As of 21 October 2026

Gadwin Springer (born 4 April 1993) is a French professional rugby league footballer who last played as a prop for Doncaster RLFC in the Championship and France at international level.

He previously played for the Catalans Dragons and the Castleford Tigers in the Super League. Springer spent time on loan from Castleford at Halifax and Toronto Wolfpack in the Championship. He played for Featherstone Rovers in 2021 and signed for Toulouse in November 2021. He was the first South American to ever appear in Super League.

== Background ==
Springer was born in French Guiana and did not discover rugby league until he moved from South America to the south-west of France in 2005. Springer originally moved to Villeneuve but developed his rugby in the Toulouse Olympique academy before being signed for Catalans Dragons.

== Club career ==
=== Catalans Dragons ===
Springer was signed by Catalans Dragons from the Toulouse Olympique academy and made his Super League début on 14 March 2014 as a substitute against St. Helens.

=== Castleford Tigers ===
On 12 June 2015 Springer joined Castleford Tigers on a 2 1/2-year contract.

He was a member of Castleford's squad which won the League Leaders Shield in 2017, making 21 appearances during the season, and was named as 18th man for the 2017 Super League Grand Final.

=== Halifax ===
On 6 November 2020 it was announced that Springer would join Halifax Panthers for the 2021 season

=== Featherstone Rovers ===
On 26 July 2021, it was reported that he had signed for Featherstone Rovers in the RFL Championship

=== Toulouse Olympique ===
In September 2021 it was reported that Springer would join Villeneuve Leopards in the French Elite One Championship at the end of his contract with Featherstone. Subsequently Toulouse Olympique won promotion to Super League and on 3 November it was announced that Springer had signed for Toulouse for their 2022 Super League season.

=== Featherstone Rovers (re-join) ===
On 30 June 2022, Springer signed a contract to return to Featherstone ahead of the 2023 season.

=== Doncaster RLFC ===
On 9 November 2025 it was reported that he had signed for Doncaster RLFC in the RFL Championship on a 1-year deal.

On 21 October 2026 it was announced that he was amongst 6 players released by Doncaster RLFC

=== Hunslet RLFC (loan) ===
On 19 March 2026 it was reported that he had signed for Hunslet RLFC in the RFL Championship on one-week loan

== International career ==
Gadwin was selected for France for their 2015 European Cup campaign. He made his international début against Ireland in Albi. He also played for France in their mid-tournament test match against England. He was a part of what was considered a 'weakened' French side due to injury and it showed with an appalling showing against their opponents. Springer played in France's lone international fixture of 2016, an end of year test match against England in Avignon.
