= Damien Cardace =

France international rugby league footballer

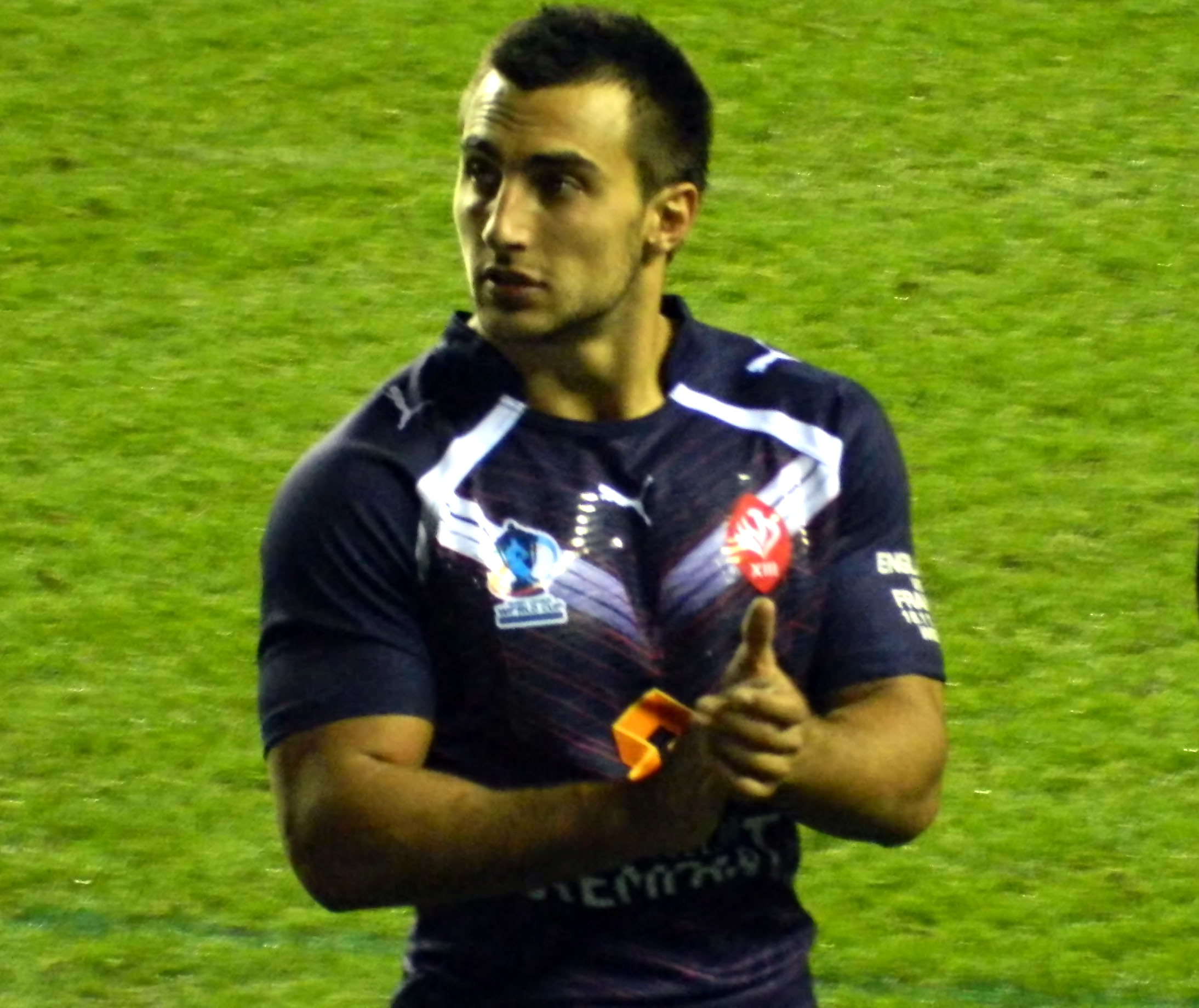

Personal information
- Born: 16 October 1992 (age 32); France
- Height: 178 cm (5 ft 10 in)
- Weight: 84 kg (13 st 3 lb)

Playing information
- Position: Wing, Centre
Club
Years	Team	Pld	T	G	FG	P
2012–15	Catalans Dragons	40	17	1	0	70
2015–	Lézignan Sangliers	56	36	29	0	208
	Total	96	53	30	0	278
Representative
Years	Team	Pld	T	G	FG	P
2011–17	France	8	1	0	0	4
- Source: As of 29 June 2019

Damian Cardace is a rugby league footballer who plays for Lézignan Sangliers in the French Elite One Championship. He previously played in the Super League for the Catalans Dragons, before being released in July 2015.

In 2013, Cardace played for France in the 2013 Rugby League World Cup.

He played in the 2014 European Cup and 2015 European Cup.
