= Tony Gigot =

French international rugby league footballer

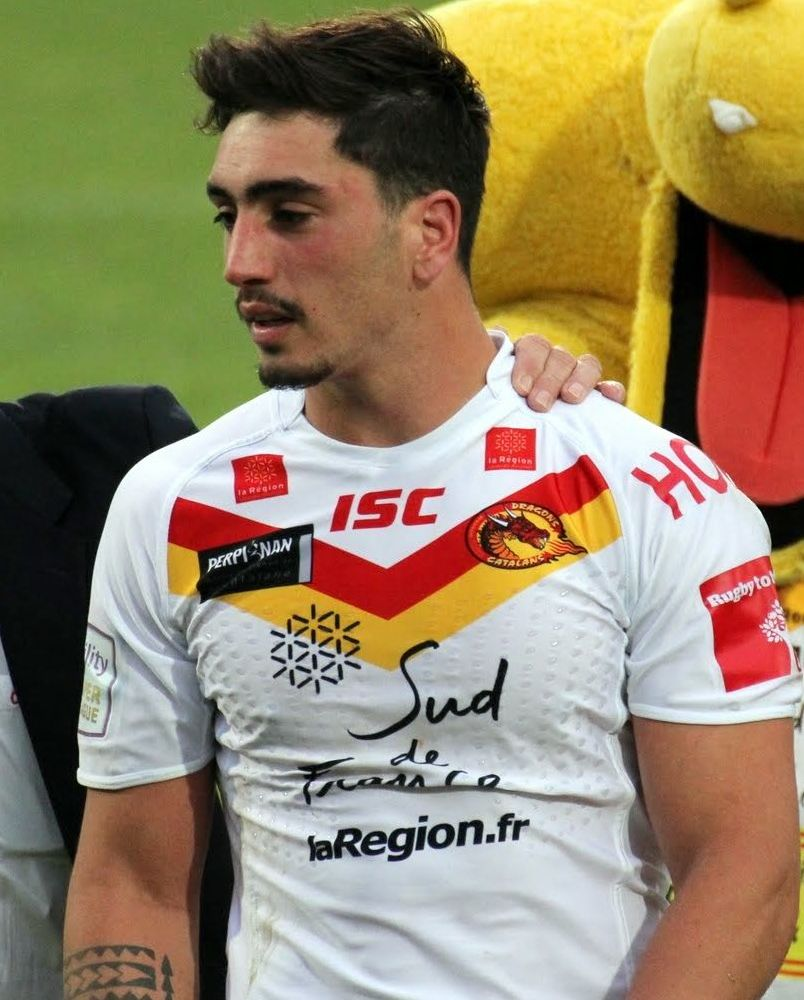

Personal information
- Born: 27 December 1990 (age 35) Avignon, Provence-Alpes-Côte d'Azur, France
- Height: 6 ft 0 in (1.82 m)
- Weight: 13 st 3 lb (84 kg)

Playing information
- Position: Fullback, Stand-off, Centre, Scrum-half
Club
Years	Team	Pld	T	G	FG	P
2010–11	Catalans Dragons	25	1	3	0	10
2011–12	Toulouse Olympique	9	5	0	0	20
2012–13	SO Avignon	18	5	21	2	64
2013	Cronulla Sharks	0	0	0	0	0
2014	London Broncos	2	0	4	0	8
2014–15	SO Avignon	15	7	15	2	60
2015–19	Catalans Dragons	129	50	52	13	313
2020	Toronto Wolfpack	4	0	0	0	0
2020–21	Wakefield Trinity	7	1	6	0	16
2021	SO Avignon	6	4	0	2	18
2021–22	Toulouse Olympique	30	4	1	4	22
2023–25	Albi	36	8	22	0	76
	Total	281	85	124	23	607
Representative
Years	Team	Pld	T	G	FG	P
2010–	France	19	9	12	1	61
- Source: As of 3 January 2023

Tony Gigot (French: [tɔni ʒiɡo]; born 27 December 1990) is a French former professional rugby league footballer who last played as a fullback, stand-off, centre or scrum-half for France at international level and Albi XIII in the Elite One Championship and France at international level.

He previously played for the London Broncos, Sporting Olympique Avignon, Cronulla-Sutherland Sharks and the Catalans Dragons in two separate spells.

== Background ==
Gigot was born in Avignon, France. His younger brother Samuel is a professional footballer.

== Club career ==
=== Early career ===
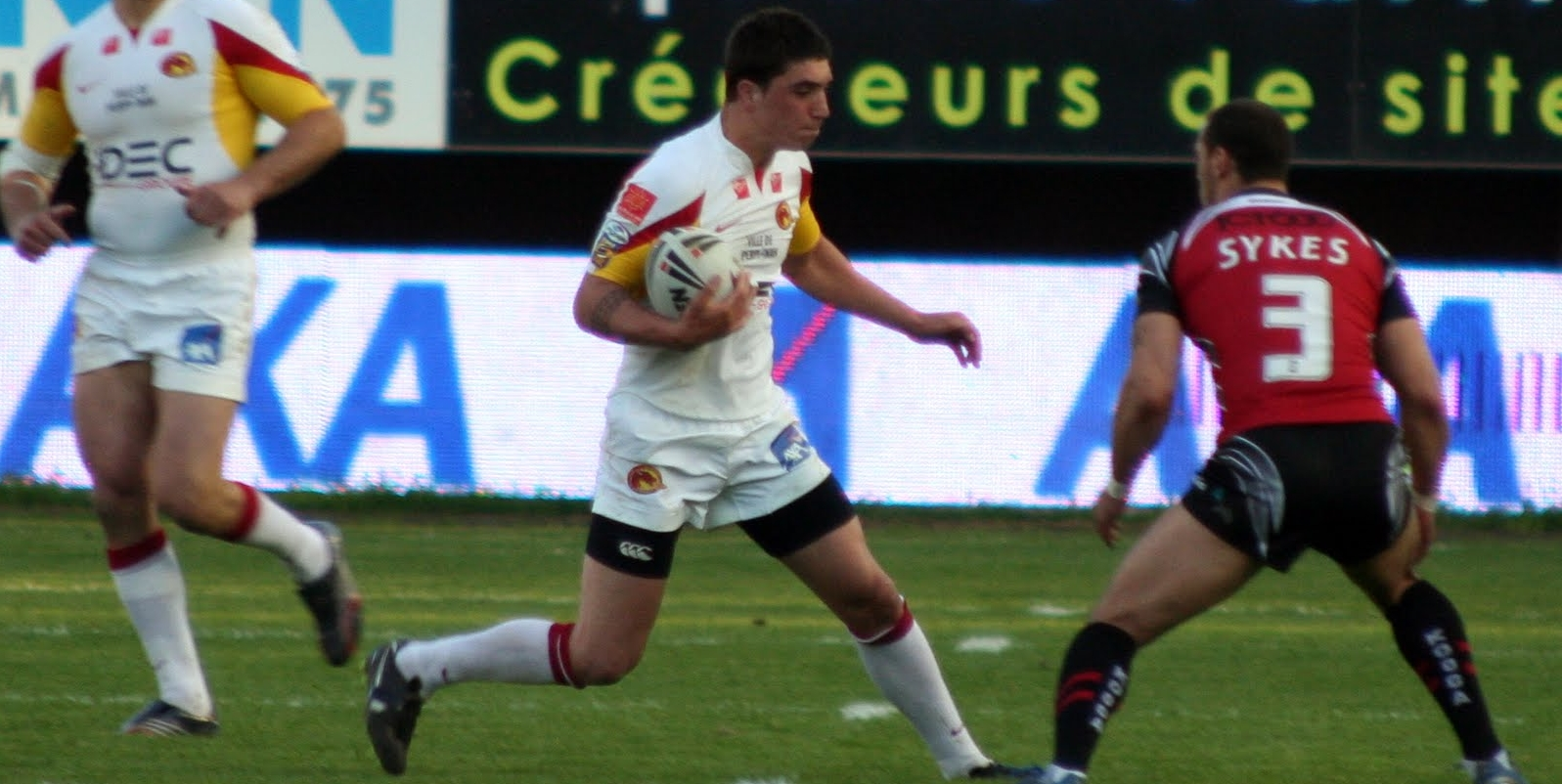
Gigot playing for the Catalans Dragons in 2010

Gigot spent time in the youth team at the London Broncos. He signed with the Catalans Dragons in 2010 and made his Super League debut that year, playing a total of 15 games and kicking two goals. He also represented Catalans in the 2010 Challenge Cup where he played 2 games and scored 1 try.

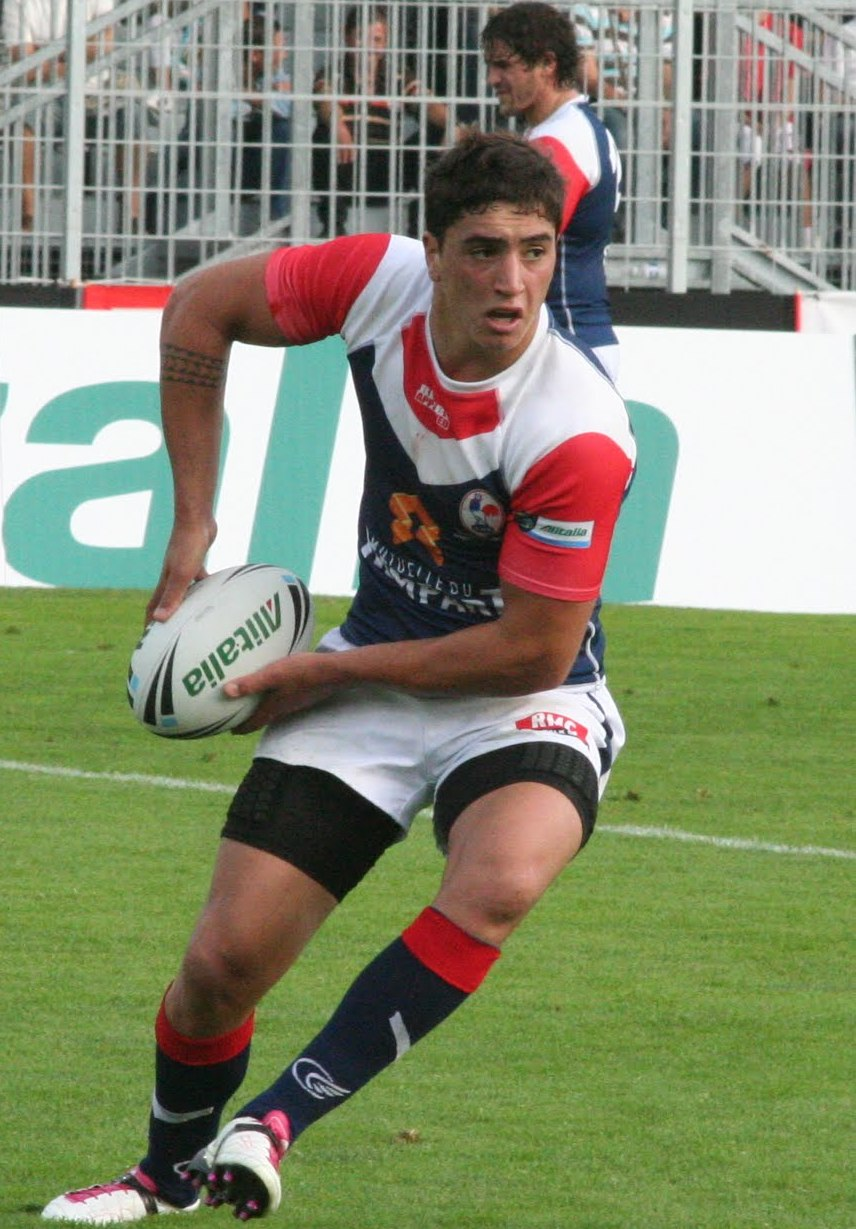
Gigot playing for France in 2010

In 2011, Gigot played 7 games throughout the season for the Catalans Dragons, kicking 1 goal. He once again represented Catalans in the 2011 Challenge Cup, where he played 1 game.

As well as playing for the Catalans Dragons, in 2011 Gigot played 9 games on loan for Toulouse Olympique in the 2011 Championship. He scored 5 tries.

After being released by Catalans, Gigot signed with the Avignon Bisons to play in the 2012-2013 Elite One Championship.

=== Cronulla-Sutherland Sharks ===
Gigot was given an early release by Avignon at the start of 2013 so he could travel to Australia for a chance to play in the Australian National Rugby League (NRL) competition. Gigot spent pre-season training with St. George Illawarra Dragons before signing a one-year deal with the Cronulla-Sutherland Sharks. He did not feature for the Sharks at NRL level, however.

=== London Broncos ===
In February 2014, Super League club London Broncos announced the signing of Tony Gigot for the 2014 season. He played two matches and kicked four goals before leaving the club to re-sign with Avignon.

=== Return to Catalans ===
In May 2015, the Catalans Dragons announced the resigning of Gigot. He made his second debut for the club playing as a centre in a 37–34 victory over Featherstone Rovers in the Challenge Cup. The following week he made his Super League return for the Dragons, scoring a hat-trick in a 58–14 victory over Wigan Warriors.

On 10 February 2017 it was announced that Gigot had been banned for two years by the French rugby league authorities for an incident with an anti-doping official during a training camp in October 2016. It was reported that Gigot had not failed a drug test and that supported by his club, Gigot appealed the ban. The appeal against the length of the ban was successful and with the ban reduced to three months, Gigot was able to play again from April 2017. However, in August 2017 the full two-year ban was reinstated by the French anti-doping agency for the "inappropriate exchange" with the anti-doping official. Gigot and the club launched a further appeal which was successful and on 9 February 2018 it was announced that Gigot was free to resume playing.

On 5 August 2018 Gigot was named Man of the Match in Catalans' 35–16 victory over St. Helens in the semi-final of the Challenge Cup. At the end of the final on 25 August he was named as the winner of the Lance Todd Trophy, becoming the first French player to win the trophy as Catalans beat Warrington Wolves 20–14.

=== Toronto Wolfpack ===
At the end of 2019, Gigot and Catalans Dragons failed to come to terms on a new contract. As a result, Gigot started the 2020 Super League season without a team and trained with Avignon to stay fit. In February 2020, the Toronto Wolfpack announced that Gigot would join the team for a four-week, unpaid trial period.

=== Wakefield Trinity ===
Gigot signed with Wakefield Trinity on 23 July 2020 on a deal until the end of the 2021 season. On 3 January 2021 Wakefield and Gigot cancelled his contract by mutual consent a due to homesickness.

=== Sporting Olympique Avignon (re-join) ===
On 29 January 2021, it was reported that he had signed for Sporting Olympique Avignon in the Elite One Championship.

=== Toulouse Olympique ===
On 7 May 2021 it was reported that he had signed for Toulouse Olympique in the RFL Championship. In January 2022, Gigot was appointed captain of Toulouse, following the sudden departure of Johnathon Ford.

== International career ==
Gigot made his first appearance for France in the 2010 European Cup, scoring one try. Tony played for France in the 2013 Rugby League World Cup, 2014 European Cup and 2015 European Cup, a tournament where Tony topped the try scoring charts with 4 tries in the 3 games France played. He played in the 2016 end of year test match against England in Avignon, kicking a goal in France's 6–40 loss. Gigot represented France at the 2021 Rugby League World Cup and played in all three group stage matches as France recorded one victory and two losses.
