= Stanislas Robin =

France international rugby league footballer

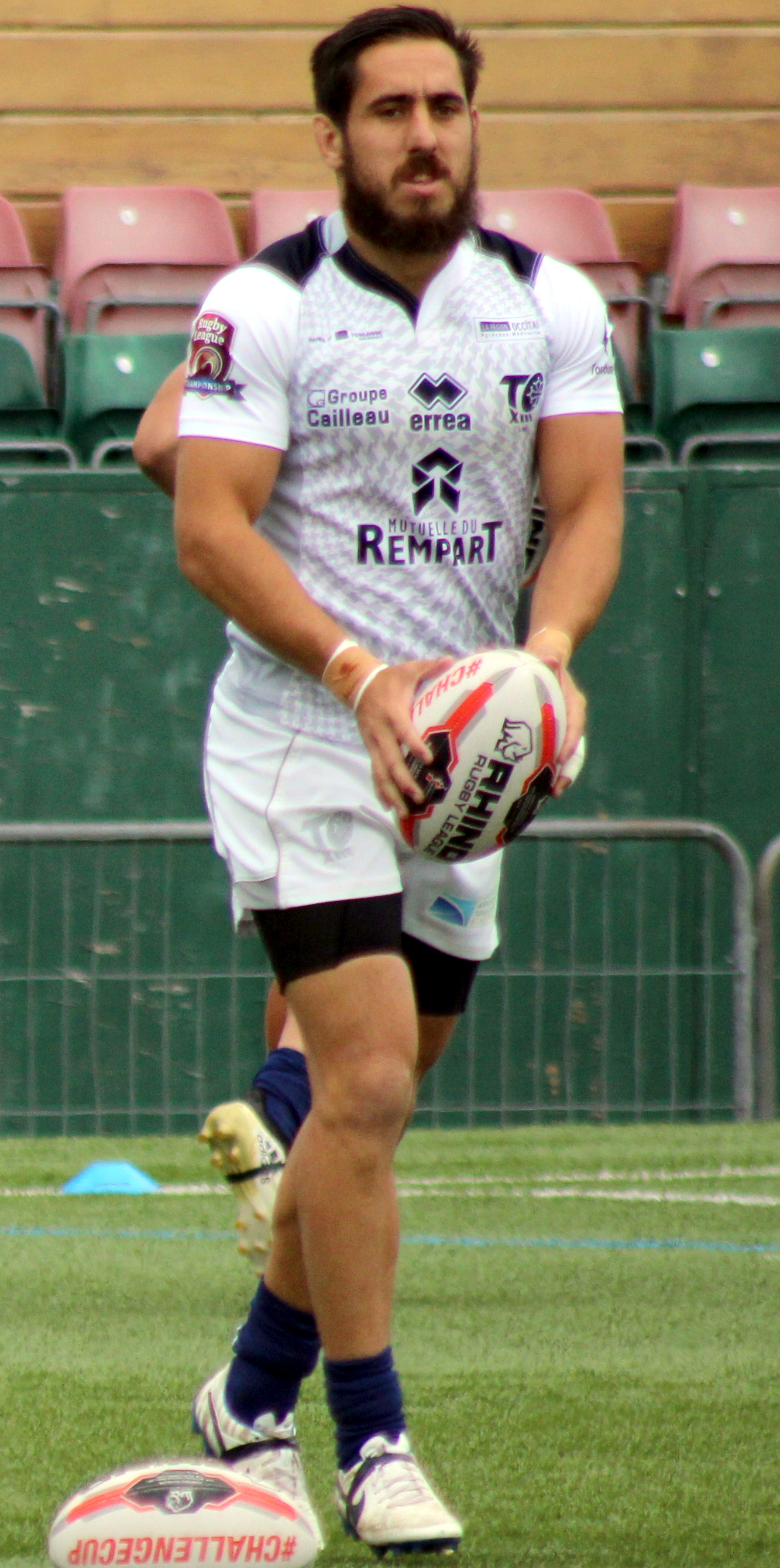

Personal information
- Full name: Stanislas Robin
- Born: 21 October 1990 (age 34)
- Height: 5 ft 9 in (174 cm)
- Weight: 12 st 6 lb (79 kg)

Playing information
- Position: Scrum-half, Stand-off, Fullback
Club
Years	Team	Pld	T	G	FG	P
2008–12	Villeneuve Leopards	53	30	0	0	120
2012–16	Catalans Dragons	10	1	0	1	5
2016	Sheffield Eagles	7	5	0	0	20
2017–20	Toulouse Olympique	42	34	3	1	143
2020–21	Villeneuve Leopards
2021–	Limoux Grizzlies
	Total	112	70	3	2	288
Representative
Years	Team	Pld	T	G	FG	P
2015–16	France	5	2	0	0	8
- Source: As of 28 February 2022

Stanislas Robin (born October 21, 1990) is a French rugby league footballer who plays as a scrum-half or stand-off for Limoux Grizzlies in the Elite One Championship.

He previously played for the Catalans Dragons, Sheffield Eagles and Toulouse Olympique.

== Club career ==
=== Villeneuve XIII RLLG ===
Robin began his career at Villeneuve Leopards. In 2011 he spent some time in the junior teams at Wakefield Trinity.

=== Catalans Dragons ===
Robin joined Catalans Dragons in 2012, playing initially for the reserve team St Esteve. He made his Super League début for the club in 2015.

=== Sheffield Eagles ===
In June 2016 he joined Sheffield Eagles on loan. In September 2016 it was confirmed that he would be joining Toulouse Olympique from 2017.

=== Villeneuve XIII RLLG (rejoin) ===
On 18 July 2020 it was reported that he had re-signed for Villeneuve XIII RLLG in the Elite One Championship

== International career ==
Robin made his début for France in October 2015, scoring a try in a victory over Ireland. Robin would go on to make two more tournament appearances, scoring one more try in the process. Robin was also a part of France's mid-tournament test match against England. He played in the 2016 end of year test match against England in Avignon.
