= Ugo Perez =

France international rugby league footballer

Personal information
- Born: 30 November 1994 (age 30); Saint-Estève, Pyrénées-Orientales, Occitania, France
- Height: 6 ft 1 in (185 cm)
- Weight: 15 st 4 lb (97 kg)

Playing information
- Position: Second-row
Club
Years	Team	Pld	T	G	FG	P
2015–21	Catalans Dragons	8	0	0	0	0
2015	→ Saint-Estève XIII Catalan(DR)		0	0	0	0
2016(loan)	→ Whitehaven	15	2	0	0	8
2017(loan)	→ Toulouse Olympique	5	0	0	0	0
2021	Pia Baroudeurs	0	0	0	0	0
	Total	28	2	0	0	8
Representative
Years	Team	Pld	T	G	FG	P
2015	France	4	1	0	0	4
- Source: As of 23 August 2021

Ugo Perez (born 30 November 1994) is a French professional rugby league footballer who plays as a second-row forward for the Pia Baroudeurs in the Elite Two Championship.

Perez is a French international.

He previously played for Catalans Dragons and spent time on loan at Whitehaven in the Championship.
