= 2012 Rugby League European Cup =

- Number of teams: 3
- Host countries: England; Ireland; Scotland
- Winner: England Knights (1st title)
- Matches played: 3
- Points scored: 194 (64.67 per match)
- Tries scored: 34 (11.33 per match)
- Top scorer: (England) Jordan Turner – (26)
- Top try scorer: (England) Jodie Broughton – (4)

The 2012 Rugby League European Cup, known as the Alitalia European Cup for sponsorship purposes, is a rugby league football tournament.

Four teams competed in the 2012 event, with teams to be decided in November 2011 following the Four Nations. These were announced as Ireland, Scotland, Italy and the England Knights.

In mid-2012, Italy had to withdraw from the competition due to travel commitments and were omitted from the league to leave 3 teams:- England Knights, Ireland and Scotland.

As they won both of their games the England Knights won the Rugby League European Cup and thus became European champions. This was the England Knights first European Championship. However England have won 14 times.

== Teams ==
Team	Coach	Captain	RLIF Rank
England Knights	Kieran Purtill	TBA	n/a (non cap team)
Scotland	Steve McCormack	TBA	10
Ireland	Mark Aston	Scott Grix	12

== Scotland vs Ireland ==
14 October 2012

Scotland	18–30	Ireland
Tries: Fisher, Stringer, Cockburn; Goals: Scott 3/3	Report	Tries: Bergin (2), Littler (2), Casey; Goals: Finn 5/6

Meggetland Stadium, Edinburgh
Attendance: 726
Referee: Ben Thaler

Scotland	positions	Ireland
1. Brett Carter	Fullback	1. Greg McNally
2. Alex Hurst	Winger	2. Tim Bergin
3. Shae Lyon-Fraser	Centre	3. Stuart Littler
4. Josh Barlow	Centre	4. Joshua O'Toole
5. David Scott	Winger	5. John O'Donnell
6. Lee Paterson	Stand Off	6. James Mendeika
7. Liam Hood	Scrum half	7. Liam Finn
8. Paul Jackson	Prop	8. Sean Hesketh
9. Andrew Henderson	Hooker	9. Carl Sice
10. Mitchell Stringer	Prop	10. Luke Ambler
11. Sam Barlow	2nd Row	11. Elliot Cosgrove
12. Dale Ferguson	2nd Row	12. Callum Casey
13. Alex Szostak	Loose forward	13. Tyrone McCarthy
14. Ben Fisher	Interchange	14. Colton Roche
15. Adam Walker	Interchange	15. Sam Wellens
16. Jonathan Walker	Interchange	16. Matty Hadden
17. Callum Cockburn	Interchange	17. Tom McKeown
Steve McCormack	Coach	Mark Aston

== Ireland vs England Knights ==
20 October 2012

Ireland	4–56	England Knights
Tries: O'Toole; Goals: Finn 0/1	Report	Tries: Broughton (2), Dixon, Turner, T. Burgess, Houghton, Gale, Lawrence, G. Burgess (2); Goals: Gale 8/10

Deramore Park, Belfast

Ireland	positions	England Knights
1. Greg McNally	Fullback	1. Chris Riley
2. Tim Bergin	Winger	2. Kieran Dixon
3. Stuart Littler	Centre	3. Jordan Turner
4. Joshua O'Toole	Centre	4. Rhys Evans
5. John O'Donnell	Winger	5. Jodie Broughton
6. James Mendeika	Stand Off	6. Dan Sarginson
7. Liam Finn	Scrum half	7. Luke Gale
8. Sean Hesketh	Prop	8. Scott Taylor
9. Carl Sice	Hooker	9. Danny Houghton
10. Luke Ambler	Prop	10. George Burgess
11. Elliot Cosgrove	2nd Row	11. Jack Hughes
12. Callum Casey	2nd Row	12. Michael Lawrence
13. Tyrone McCarthy	Loose forward	13. Mike Cooper
14. Colton Roche	Interchange	14. Tom Burgess
15. Sam Wellens	Interchange	15. Shaun Lunt
16. Matty Hadden	Interchange	16. Chris Clarkson
17. Tom McKeown	Interchange	17. Ben Jones-Bishop
Mark Aston	Coach	Kieran Purtill

== England Knights vs Scotland ==
28 October 2012

Scotland	24–62	England Knights
Tries: Stringer, Paterson, Phillips, Borthwick; Goals: Scott 4/4	Report	Tries: Sarginson (2), Evans (2), Broughton (2), Taylor (2), G. Burgess, Dixon, Turner; Goals: Turner 9/11

Meggetland Stadium, Edinburgh

Scotland	positions	England Knights
1. Brett Carter	Fullback	1. Chris Riley
2.	Winger	2. Kieran Dixon
3.	Centre	3.
4.	Centre	4. Rhys Evans
5. David Scott	Winger	5. Jodie Broughton
6. Lee Paterson	Stand Off	6. Jordan Turner
7. Liam Hood	Scrum half	7. Dan Sarginson
8.	Prop	8. Scott Taylor
9. Andrew Henderson	Hooker	9. Danny Houghton
10. Mitchell Stringer	Prop	10. George Burgess
11.	2nd Row	11. Jack Hughes
12.	2nd Row	12.
13.	Loose forward	13. Mike Cooper
14.	Interchange	14. Tom Burgess
15.	Interchange	15. Ben Currie
16.	Interchange	16. Chris Clarkson
17. Craig Borthwick	Interchange	17. Ben Jones-Bishop
	Coach	
