= 2016 Rugby League Four Nations squads =

The Four Nations Rugby Squad is a biennial rugby tournament representing the top three nations of the sport including an additional underperforming team. Australia, England and New Zealand are the top three nations excelling in the game. The event is recognized as Ladbroke Four Nations because the tournament is sponsored by Ladbrokes, a British gambling company. The squads competing in the 2016 rugby tournament consists of Australia, England, New Zealand and Scotland. The rosters for each squad below consist of player’s information and the head coach of each team.

== Squads ==
=== Australia ===
Head Coach: (Australia) Mal Meninga

- On October 4, Mal Meninga named the following 24 players as part of his squad in preparation for the tournament.

Player	Games	Points	Position	2016 Club
Cameron Smith (c)	3	0	HK	Melbourne Storm
Darius Boyd	2	0	FB	Brisbane Broncos
Matt Moylan	1	0	FB	Penrith Panthers
Blake Ferguson	3	12	WG	Sydney Roosters
Valentine Holmes	2	4	WG	Cronulla-Sutherland Sharks
Josh Mansour	1	8	WG	Penrith Panthers
Josh Dugan	2	8	CE	St. George Illawarra Dragons
Greg Inglis	2	4	CE	South Sydney Rabbitohs
Justin O'Neill	2	0	CE	North Queensland Cowboys
James Maloney	2	18	FE	Cronulla-Sutherland Sharks
Michael Morgan	3	4	FE	North Queensland Cowboys
Johnathan Thurston	2	22	FE	North Queensland Cowboys
Cooper Cronk	2	8	HB	Melbourne Storm
Shannon Boyd	2	0	PR	Canberra Raiders
David Klemmer	3	0	PR	Canterbury Bulldogs
Matt Scott	2	4	PR	North Queensland Cowboys
Aaron Woods	3	0	PR	Wests Tigers
Jake Friend	1	0	HK	Sydney Roosters
Boyd Cordner	2	0	SR	Sydney Roosters
Tyson Frizell	2	4	SR	St. George Illawarra Dragons
Matt Gillett	2	4	SR	Brisbane Broncos
Sam Thaiday	3	0	SR	Brisbane Broncos
Trent Merrin	3	0	LK	Penrith Panthers
Jake Trbojevic*	1	4	LK	Manly Sea Eagles

* Replaced Josh Papalii who withdrew due to injury on 13 October.

=== England ===
Head Coach: (Australia) Wayne Bennett

- On October 10, Wayne Bennett named the following 24 players as part of his squad in preparation for the tournament.

Player	Games	Points	Position	2016 Club
Sam Burgess (c)	3	0	LK	South Sydney Rabbitohs
Jonny Lomax	3	0	FB	St. Helens
Stefan Ratchford	0	0	FB	Warrington Wolves
Ryan Hall	3	12	WG	Leeds Rhinos
Jermaine McGillvary	3	12	WG	Huddersfield Giants
Mark Percival	2	4	CE	St. Helens
Dan Sarginson	1	0	CE	Wigan Warriors
Kallum Watkins	3	0	CE	Leeds Rhinos
Kevin Brown	1	0	FE	Widnes Vikings
Gareth Widdop	2	18	FE	St. George Illawarra Dragons
George Williams	2	0	FE	Wigan Warriors
Luke Gale	2	14	HB	Castleford Tigers
George Burgess	3	0	PR	South Sydney Rabbitohs
Tom Burgess	3	0	PR	South Sydney Rabbitohs
Mike Cooper	3	0	PR	St. George Illawarra Dragons
James Graham	2	0	PR	Canterbury-Bankstown Bulldogs
Chris Hill	3	0	PR	Warrington Wolves
Scott Taylor	1	0	PR	Hull F.C.
Daryl Clark	2	0	HK	Warrington Wolves
Josh Hodgson	3	0	HK	Canberra Raiders
John Bateman	2	0	SR	Wigan Warriors
Liam Farrell	1	4	SR	Wigan Warriors
Stevie Ward^{*}	0	0	SR	Leeds Rhinos
Elliott Whitehead	3	8	SR	Canberra Raiders

^{*} Replaced Brett Ferres who withdrew due to injury on October 18.

=== New Zealand ===
Head Coach: (New Zealand) David Kidwell

- On October 4, David Kidwell named the following 24 players as part of his squad in preparation for the tournament.

Player	Games	Points	Position	2016 Club
Jesse Bromwich (c)	3	0	PR	Melbourne Storm
David Fusitu'a	1	8	FB	New Zealand Warriors
Jason Nightingale	2	0	WG	St. George Illawarra Dragons
Jordan Rapana	2	12	WG	Canberra Raiders
Dallin Watene-Zelezniak	1	0	WG	Penrith Panthers
Gerard Beale	2	8	CE	Cronulla Sharks
Jordan Kahu	2	4	CE	Brisbane Broncos
Solomone Kata	3	4	CE	New Zealand Warriors
Shaun Kenny-Dowall	2	0	CE	Sydney Roosters
Thomas Leuluai	3	0	FE	New Zealand Warriors
Te Maire Martin	1	0	FE	Penrith Panthers
Shaun Johnson	3	5	HB	New Zealand Warriors
Adam Blair	3	0	PR	Brisbane Broncos
Jared Waerea-Hargreaves	1	0	PR	Sydney Roosters
Martin Taupau	3	0	PR	Manly Sea Eagles
Issac Luke	3	2	HK	New Zealand Warriors
Lewis Brown	2	0	SR	Manly Sea Eagles
James Fisher-Harris^{*}	1	0	SR	Penrith Panthers
Tohu Harris	3	0	SR	Melbourne Storm
Manu Maʻu	3	0	SR	Parramatta Eels
Kevin Proctor	2	0	SR	Melbourne Storm
Joseph Tapine	1	0	SR	Canberra Raiders
Greg Eastwood	2	0	LK	Canterbury Bulldogs
Jason Taumalolo	2	0	LK	North Queensland Cowboys

^{*} Replaced Simon Mannering who withdrew due to injury on October 18.

=== Scotland ===
Head Coach: (England) Steve McCormack

- On October 11, Steve McCormack named the following 24 players as part of his squad in preparation for the tournament.

Player	Games	Points	Position	2016 Club
Danny Brough (c)	3	10	HB	Huddersfield Giants
Lachlan Coote	3	0	FB	North Queensland Cowboys
Matty Russell	3	4	WG	Warrington Wolves
David Scott	0	0	WG	Batley Bulldogs
Lewis Tierney	3	4	WG	Wigan Warriors
Euan Aitken	3	4	CE	St. George Illawarra Dragons
Ben Hellewell	3	4	CE	London Broncos
Kane Linnett	3	4	CE	North Queensland Cowboys
Ryan Brierley	2	4	FE	Huddersfield Giants
Callum Phillips	2	0	HB	Workington Town
Sam Brooks	2	0	PR	Widnes Vikings
Luke Douglas	3	0	PR	Gold Coast Titans
Ben Kavanagh	3	4	PR	Bradford Bulls
Billy McConnachie	2	0	PR	Ipswich Jets
Kieran Moran	0	0	PR	Hull Kingston Rovers
Sheldon Powe-Hobbs	1	0	PR	Northern Pride
Adam Walker	3	0	PR	Hull Kingston Rovers
Liam Hood	3	0	HK	Leigh Centurions
Ryan Maneely	0	0	HK	Halifax
Frankie Mariano	2	0	SR	Unattached
Brett Phillips	0	0	SR	Workington Town
Danny Addy	3	0	LK	Bradford Bulls
Tyler Cassel	1	0	LK	Wests Tigers
Dale Ferguson	3	4	LK	Bradford Bulls
