= 2014 Rugby League European Championship =

International rugby league tournament

- Number of teams: 4
- Host countries: England; Ireland; France; Scotland; Wales
- Winner: Scotland (1st title)
- Matches played: 5
- Attendance: 11,414 (2,283 per match)
- Points scored: 307 (61.4 per match)
- Tries scored: 57 (11.4 per match)
- Top scorer: (France) Rémy Marginet (48)
- Top try scorer: (France) Rémy Marginet (5)

The 2014 Rugby League European Championship was an international rugby league football tournament. The tournament took place in England, Wales, France, Ireland and Scotland between 17 October and 2 November. It was announced beforehand that the winner of the tournament would qualify for the 2016 Four Nations, and also that if Ireland or Wales won tournament, they will automatically qualify for the 2017 Rugby League World Cup (due to the World Cup qualifying tournament taking place at the same time as the 2016 Four Nations). France and Scotland had already qualified for that tournament.

The England Knights were defending Champions but they did not compete in this year's tournament. Four teams competed in the 2014 event; Scotland, Ireland, France and Wales. Scotland were crowned champions on points differential, and subsequently won their first Rugby League European Championship title. Scotland therefore qualified for the 2016 Four Nations, which will be their first appearance in a Four Nations tournament.

== Teams ==
Team	Coach	Captain	RLIF Rank
France	Richard Agar	Jason Baitieri	4
Ireland	Mark Aston	Bob Beswick	10
Scotland	Steve McCormack	Danny Brough	11
Wales	John Kear	Peter Lupton	6

== Squads ==
=== France ===
Head Coach: (England) Richard Agar

- On 3 October, Richard Agar named the following 23 players as part of his squad in preparation for the tournament.
- On 7 October, Aaron Wood and Tony Maurel of Toulouse Olympique were called into Richard Agar's squad to replace Morgan Escaré (medical reasons) and Vincent Duport (resting after Super League).

Player	Games	Points	Position	2014 Club
Tony Maurel	1	4	FB	(France) Toulouse Olympique
Mathias Pala	3	8	WG	(France) AS Saint Estève
Frédéric Vaccari	3	0	WG	(France) Palau Broncos
Clément Soubeyras	1	4	WG	(France) AS Carcassonne
Damien Cardace	3	0	CE	(France) Catalans Dragons
Jean-Philippe Baile	3	4	CE	(France) AS Saint Estève
Aurélien Decarnin	2	4	CE	(France) Villeneuve Leopards
Benjamin Jullien	0	0	CE	(France) SO Avignon
Théo Fages	3	4	SO	(England) Salford Red Devils
Anthony Carrere	0	0	SO	(France) Lézignan Sangliers
William Barthau	1	0	SH	(France) Catalans Dragons
Rémy Marginet	3	48	SH	(France) Palau Broncos
Julian Bousquet	3	0	PR	(France) Catalans Dragons
Mickaël Simon	3	0	PR	(France) AS Saint Estève
Jamal Fakir	3	0	PR	(France) Lézignan Sangliers
Aaron Wood	3	0	PR	(France) Toulouse Olympique
Éloi Pélissier	3	4	HK	(France) Catalans Dragons
John Boudebza	1	0	HK	(France) Lézignan Sangliers
Kevin Larroyer	3	4	SR	(England) Hull Kingston Rovers
Benjamin Garcia	3	0	SR	(France) Catalans Dragons
Antoni Maria	2	0	SR	(France) Catalans Dragons
Jason Baitieri (C)	3	4	LF	(France) Catalans Dragons
Thibaut Margalet	0	0	LF	(France) AS Saint Estève

=== Ireland ===
Head Coach: (England) Mark Aston

- On 10 October, Mark Aston named the following 29 players as part of a train-on squad in preparation for the tournament.
- On 16 October, Mark Aston added Halifax halfback Ben Johnston to his squad for the tournament.
- Liam Finn was a late addition for the Irish team. He arrived just in time to play for Ireland in their final tournament match against Wales.

Player	Games	Points	Position	2014 Club
Shannon McDonnell	3	8	FB	(England) St. Helens
Michael Platt	1	0	FB	(England) Leigh Centurions
Callum Mulkeen	2	0	WG	(England) Oxford Rugby League
James Toole	2	4	WG	(Australia) Tweed Heads Seagulls
Casey Dunne	3	6	WG	(Ireland) Athboy Longhorns
Elliot Cosgrove	1	0	WG	(England) Keighley Cougars
Stuart Littler	2	0	CE	(England) Leigh Centurions
Joshua Toole	3	0	CE	(Australia) North Sydney Bears
Bradley Hargreaves	1	12	CE	(England) Wigan St Patricks
Graham O'Keeffe	1	0	CE	(Ireland) Treaty City Titans
Apirana Pewhairangi	0	0	SO	(Australia) Parramatta Eels
Pat Smith	0	0	SO	(England) York City Knights
Ben Johnston	2	0	SH	(England) Halifax
Gregg McNally	0	0	SH	(England) Leigh Centurions
Brendan Guilfoyle	0	0	PR	(Ireland) Treaty City Titans
Matty Hadden	3	0	PR	(Ireland) Antrim Eels
Sean Hesketh	3	0	PR	(England) Batley Bulldogs
Luke Ambler	3	4	PR	(England) Halifax
Colton Roche	0	0	PR	(England) York City Knights
Robbie Mulhern	3	0	PR	(England) Leeds Rhinos
Michael Russell	0	0	HK	(Ireland) Barnhall Butchers
Sean Casey	0	0	HK	(England) Rochdale Hornets
Wayne Kelly	2	0	HK	(Ireland) Belfast Met Scholars
Danny Bridge	0	0	SR	(England) Warrington Wolves
Will Hope	3	4	SR	(England) Sheffield Eagles
Jobe Murphy	3	4	SR	(England) Dewsbury Rams
Haydn Peacock	3	12	SR	(France) AS Carcassonne
Lemeki Vaipulu	0	0	SR	(Ireland) Treaty City Titans
Bob Beswick (C)	3	0	LF	(England) Leigh Centurions
Callum Casey	3	0	LF	(England) Halifax

=== Scotland ===
Head Coach: (England) Steve McCormack

- On 10 October, Steve McCormack named the following 31 players as part of a train-on squad in preparation for the tournament.

Player	Games	Points	Position	2014 Club
Brett Carter	0	0	FB	(England) Workington Town
Alex Hurst	3	4	FB	(Australia) Tweed Heads Seagulls
Nathan Massey	3	0	FB	(Australia) Canterbury Bulldogs
Alex Walker	0	0	FB	(England) London Broncos
Gregor Ramsey	0	0	FB	(Scotland) Easterhouse Panthers
Harvey Burnett	1	0	WG	(England) London Broncos
Richard Harris	0	0	WG	(England) Warrington Wolves
Lee Paterson	0	0	WG	(England) York City Knights
David Scott	3	8	WG	(England) Doncaster
Jack Stewart	0	0	WG	(England) Hull Kingston Rovers
Ben Hellewell	3	4	CE	(England) London Broncos
Shane Toal	0	0	CE	(England) Barrow Raiders
Joe Wardle	3	0	CE	(England) Huddersfield Giants
Danny Brough (C)	3	29	SO	(England) Huddersfield Giants
Oscar Thomas	3	8	SO	(England) London Broncos
Louis Senter	3	0	SO	(England) Halifax
Callum Phillips	3	8	SH	(England) Workington Town
Finn Murphy	0	0	SH	(Scotland) Edinburgh Eagles
Sam Barlow	0	0	PR	(England) Leigh Centurions
Ben Kavanagh	3	4	PR	(England) Widnes Vikings
Iain Morrison	0	0	PR	(England) York City Knights
Adam Walker	3	4	PR	(England) Hull Kingston Rovers
Jonathan Walker	2	8	PR	(England) Leigh Centurions
Josh Barlow	3	0	HK	(England) Swinton Lions
Ryan Maneely	0	0	HK	(England) Warrington Wolves
Lewis Clarke	0	0	HK	(Scotland) Edinburgh Eagles
Brett Phillips	2	4	SR	(England) Workington Town
Sonny Esslemont	3	0	SR	(England) Hull Kingston Rovers
Corbyn Kilday	3	4	SR	(England) Wakefield Trinity Wildcats
Joe McClean	1	0	SR	(England) Gloucestershire All Golds
Danny Addy	3	4	LF	(England) Bradford Bulls

=== Wales ===
Head Coach: (England) John Kear

- On 7 October, John Kear named the following 25 players as part of his squad in preparation for the tournament.
- On 9 October, John Kear brought in four new players to the team to add to his train-on squad after withdrawals from Garreth Carvell and Rob Massam. Carvell withdrew due to injury while Massam cited work commitments. The four new players Kear brought in are: Tom Hughes, Morgan Evans, Lewis Reece and Owain Griffiths.

Player	Games	Points	Position	2014 Club
Elliot Kear	0	0	FB	(England) Bradford Bulls
Lewis Reece	3	10	FB	(Australia) Toowoomba Clydesdales
Jordan Sheridan	0	0	FB	South Wales Scorpions
Tom Hughes	3	4	FB	(England) Coventry Bears
Dalton Grant	2	4	WG	(England) Barrow Raiders
Rhys Williams	3	12	WG	(Australia) Central Queensland Capras
Ashley Bateman	2	0	WG	South Wales Scorpions
Christiaan Roets	3	8	CE	North Wales Crusaders
Yannic Parker	1	0	CE	(England) Oxford Rugby League
Kyle Scrivens	2	0	CE	South Wales Scorpions
Paul Emanuelli	2	0	SO	South Wales Scorpions
Ollie Olds	3	0	SH	(Australia) Ipswich Jets
Jacob Emmitt	0	0	PR	(England) Leigh Centurions
Joe Burke	2	0	PR	(England) Barrow Raiders
Dan Fleming	3	4	PR	(England) Castleford Tigers
Izaak Duffy	2	0	PR	(England) Gloucestershire All Golds
Phil Carleton	1	0	PR	South Wales Scorpions
Morgan Evans	3	0	PR	South Wales Scorpions
Connor Farrer	3	8	HK	South Wales Scorpions
Matty Fozard	2	4	HK	(England) St. Helens
Owain Griffiths	1	0	HK	North Wales Crusaders
Byron Smith	1	0	SR	(England) Batley Bulldogs
Matt Barron	3	0	SR	(England) Gateshead Thunder
Ricky Hough	3	0	SR	(England) Gateshead Thunder
Peter Lupton (C)	3	0	LF	(England) Workington Town

== Venues ==
The games will be played at the following venues in England, Ireland, France, Scotland and Wales.

Workington	Dublin	Albi	Galashiels	Wrexham
Derwent Park	Tallaght Stadium	Stadium Municipal d'Albi	Netherdale	Racecourse Ground
Capacity: 10,000	Capacity: 6,000	Capacity: 13,058	Capacity: 4,000	Capacity: 10,771

== Standings ==
Team	Played	Won	Drew	Lost	For	Ag.	Diff	Points
Scotland	3	2	0	1	89	60	+29	4
France	3	2	0	1	92	66	+26	4
Ireland	3	2	0	1	72	51	+21	4
Wales	3	0	0	3	54	130	–76	0

== Fixtures ==
=== Round 1 ===
17 October 2014

Scotland	42–18	Wales

Derwent Park, Workington

18 October 2014

Ireland	22–12	France

Tallaght Stadium, Dublin

=== Round 2 ===
25 October 2014

Ireland	4–25	Scotland

Tallaght Stadium, Dublin

25 October 2014

France	42–22	Wales

Stadium Municipal d'Albi, Albi

=== Round 3 ===
31 October 2014

Scotland	22–38	France

Netherdale, Galashiels

2 November 2014

Wales	14–46	Ireland

Racecourse Ground, Wrexham

== Matches details ==
All times are local: UTC+0/GMT in English venues. UTC+1/CET in French venues. UTC+0/WET in Irish venues. UTC+0/GMT in Welsh venues. UTC+0/GMT in Scottish venues.

=== Scotland vs Wales ===
17 October 2014
20:00

Scotland	42 – 18	Wales
Try: Brough 12' c Thomas 17'; Kilday 28' c J Walker 46' c Scott (2) 49' c, 62'; C Phillips 51'; B Phillips 70' c Goal: Brough (5/8) 13', 29', 47', 50', 71'	Report	Try: Williams 10'; Roets 39'; Farrer (2) 44' c, 76'; Goal: Hough (0/2); Reece (1/2) 45'

Derwent Park, Workington
Attendance: 2,036
Referee: James Child
Player of the Match: Danny Brough (Scotland)

FB	1	Oscar Thomas
RW	2	David Scott
RC	3	Ben Hellewell
LC	4	Joe Wardle
LW	5	Alex Hurst
SO	6	Danny Brough (c)
SH	7	Nathan Massey
PR	8	Adam Walker
HK	9	Danny Addy
PR	10	Ben Kavanagh
SR	11	Brett Phillips
SR	12	Corbyn Kilday
LF	13	Sonny Esslemont
Substitutions:
IC	14	Callum Phillips
IC	15	Josh Barlow
IC	16	Jonathan Walker
IC	17	Louis Senter
Coach:
(England) Steve McCormack

FB	1	Tom Hughes
RW	3	Yannic Parker
RC	8	Kyle Scrivens
LC	11	Christiaan Roets
LW	19	Rhys Williams
SO	6	Ollie Olds
SH	10	Peter Lupton (c)
PR	13	Daniel Fleming
HK	16	Ricky Hough
PR	12	Matt Barron
SR	9	Phil Carleton
SR	7	Ashley Bateman
LF	22	Joe Burke
Substitutions:
IC	14	Connor Farrer
IC	15	Izaak Duffy
IC	17	Lewis Reece
IC	18	Morgan Evans
Coach:
(England) John Kear

=== Ireland vs France ===
18 October 2014
14:00

Ireland	22 – 12	France
Try: McDonnell (2) 7', 46'; Peacock (2) 30', 53'; Murphy 79' c Goal: Dunne (1/5) 80'	Report	Try: Larroyer 58' c Pélissier 70' c Goal: Marginet (2/2) 61', 71'

Tallaght Stadium, Dublin
Attendance: 1,428
Referee: Ben Thaler
Player of the Match: Josh Toole (Ireland)

FB	1	Shannon McDonnell
RW	2	Callum Mulkeen
RC	3	Haydn Peacock
LC	4	Michael Platt
LW	5	Casey Dunne
SO	6	Callum Casey
SH	7	Ben Johnston
PR	8	Robbie Mulhern
HK	9	Bob Beswick (c)
PR	10	Luke Ambler
SR	11	Elliot Cosgrove
SR	12	Josh Toole
LF	13	Will Hope
Substitutes
IC	14	Jobe Murphy
IC	15	Sean Hesketh
IC	16	Wayne Kelly
IC	17	Matty Hadden
Coach:
(England) Mark Aston

FB	1	Tony Maurel
RW	2	Mathias Pala
RC	3	Jean-Philippe Baile
LC	4	Damien Cardace
LW	5	Frédéric Vaccari
SO	6	Théo Fages
SH	7	William Barthau
PR	8	Jamal Fakir
HK	9	Éloi Pélissier
PR	10	Michael Simon
SR	11	Kevin Larroyer
SR	12	Benjamin Garcia
LF	13	Jason Baitieri (c)
Substitutes
IC	14	Rémy Marginet
IC	15	Aaron Wood
IC	16	Julian Bousquet
IC	17	Antoni Maria
Coach:
(England) Richard Agar

=== Ireland vs Scotland ===
25 October 2014
14:00

Ireland	4 – 25	Scotland
Try: James Toole 73'; Goal: Dunne (0/1)	Report	Try: C Phillips 39' c Hurst 48' c Addy 57' c Thomas 77'; Goal: Brough (3/4) 40', 49', 58'; Drop Goal: Brough (1/1) 63'

Tallaght Stadium, Dublin
Referee: Richard Silverwood

FB	1	Shannon McDonnell
RW	2	Callum Mulkeen
RC	3	Haydn Peacock
LC	4	Stuart Littler
LW	5	Casey Dunne
SO	6	Callum Casey
SH	7	James Toole
PR	8	Robbie Mulhern
HK	9	Bob Beswick (c)
PR	10	Luke Ambler
SR	11	Jobe Murphy
SR	12	Josh Toole
LF	13	Will Hope
Substitutes
IC	14	Wayne Kelly
IC	15	Sean Hesketh
IC	16	Graham O'Keeffe
IC	17	Matty Hadden
Coach:
(England) Mark Aston

FB	1	Oscar Thomas
RW	2	David Scott
RC	3	Ben Hellewell
LC	4	Joe Wardle
LW	5	Alex Hurst
SO	6	Danny Brough (c)
SH	7	Nathan Massey
PR	8	Adam Walker
HK	9	Danny Addy
PR	10	Ben Kavanagh
SR	11	Brett Phillips
SR	12	Corbyn Kilday
LF	13	Sonny Esslemont
Substitutions:
IC	14	Callum Phillips
IC	15	Josh Barlow
IC	16	Joe McClean
IC	17	Louis Senter
Coach:
(England) Steve McCormack

=== France vs Wales ===
25 October 2014
15:00

France	42 – 22	Wales
Try: Soubeyras 7' c Fages 20' c Baile 34' c Pala (2) 39' c, 52'c Marginet (2) 41' c, 55' c Goal: Marginet 7/7	Report	Try: Fleming 10' c Fozard 47'c Williams 64' c Roets 68'; Goal: Reece 3/4

Stadium Municipal d'Albi, Albi
Attendance: 5,225
Referee: Tim Roby

FB	1	Mathias Pala
RW	2	Clément Soubeyras
RC	3	Aurélien Decarnin
LC	4	Damien Cardace
LW	5	Frédéric Vaccari
SO	6	Théo Fages
SH	7	Rémy Marginet
PR	8	Jamal Fakir
HK	9	John Boudebza
PR	10	Michael Simon
SR	11	Kevin Larroyer
SR	12	Benjamin Garcia
LF	13	Jason Baitieri (c)
Substitutes
IC	14	Éloi Pélissier
IC	15	Jean-Philippe Baile
IC	16	Julian Bousquet
IC	17	Aaron Wood
Coach:
(England) Richard Agar

FB	1	Tom Hughes
RW	3	Dalton Grant
RC	8	Kyle Scrivens
LC	11	Christiaan Roets
LW	19	Rhys Williams
SO	6	Ollie Olds
SH	10	Peter Lupton (c)
PR	13	Daniel Fleming
HK	5	Connor Farrer
PR	12	Matt Barron
SR	21	Lewis Reece
SR	16	Ricky Hough
LF	7	Matty Fozard
Substitutes
IC	14	Owain Griffiths
IC	15	Izaak Duffy
IC	17	Paul Emanuelli
IC	24	Morgan Evans
Coach:
(England) John Kear

=== Scotland vs France ===
31 September 2014
19:30

Scotland	22 – 38	France
Try: Kavanagh 3' c Hellewell 63'; A Walker 75' c J Walker 77' c Goal: Brough (3/4) 4', 76', 78'	Report	Try: Marginet (3) 14' c, 22', 28' c Baitieri 19' c Pélissier 24'; Decarnin 34' c Gigot 38' c Goal: Marginet (5/7) 15', 20', 29', 35', 39'

Netherdale, Galashiels
Attendance: 1,432
Referee: Richard Silverwood
Player of the Match: Rémy Marginet (France)

FB	1	Oscar Thomas
RW	2	David Scott
RC	3	Ben Hellewell
LC	4	Joe Wardle
LW	5	Alex Hurst
SO	6	Danny Brough (c)
SH	7	Nathan Massey
PR	8	Adam Walker
HK	9	Danny Addy
PR	10	Jonathan Walker
SR	11	Sonny Esslemont
SR	12	Corbyn Kilday
LK	13	Ben Kavanagh
Substitutions:
IC	14	Callum Phillips
IC	15	Josh Barlow
IC	16	Harvey Burnett
IC	17	Louis Senter
Coach:
(England) Steve McCormack

FB	1	Mathias Pala
RW	2	Tony Gigot
RC	3	Aurélien Decarnin
LC	4	Damien Cardace
LW	5	Frédéric Vaccari
SO	6	Théo Fages
SH	7	Rémy Marginet
PR	8	Jamal Fakir
HK	9	Antoni Maria
PR	10	Michael Simon
SR	11	Kevin Larroyer
SR	12	Benjamin Garcia
LF	13	Jason Baitieri (c)
Substitutes
IC	14	Éloi Pélissier
IC	15	Jean-Philippe Baile
IC	16	Julian Bousquet
IC	17	Aaron Wood
Coach:
(England) Richard Agar

=== Wales vs Ireland ===
2 November 2014
14:30

Wales	14 – 46	Ireland
Try: Williams 46' c Grant 62'; Hughes 79'; Goal: Reece (1/2) 47'; Emanuelli (0/1)	Report	Try: Hope 4' c Hargreaves (3) 12', 30' c, 50' c Ambler 18' c Finn 38' c Peacock 72' c Dunne 78' c Goal: Finn (7/8) 5', 19', 31', 39', 51', 73', 79'

Racecourse Ground, Wrexham
Attendance: 1,293
Referee: Ben Thaler

FB	1	Tom Hughes
RW	3	Dalton Grant
RC	21	Lewis Reece
LC	11	Christiaan Roets
LW	19	Rhys Williams
SO	6	Ollie Olds
SH	10	Peter Lupton (c)
PR	34	Byron Smith
HK	18	Matty Fozard
PR	12	Matt Barron
SR	31	Ricky Hough
SR	7	Ashley Bateman
LF	13	Daniel Fleming
Substitutes
IC	22	Joe Burke
IC	5	Connor Farrer
IC	24	Morgan Evans
IC	17	Paul Emanuelli
Coach:
(England) John Kear

FB	1	Shannon McDonnell
RW	2	Brad Hargreaves
RC	3	Haydn Peacock
LC	4	Stuart Littler
LW	5	Casey Dunne
SO	6	Ben Johnston
SH	7	Liam Finn
PR	8	Robbie Mulhern
HK	9	Bob Beswick (c)
PR	10	Luke Ambler
SR	11	Will Hope
SR	12	Josh Toole
LF	13	Callum Casey
Substitutions:
IC	14	Jobe Murphy
IC	15	Sean Hesketh
IC	16	James Toole
IC	17	Matty Hadden
Coach:
(England) Mark Aston
