= Byron Smith =

Byron Smith may refer to:

- Byron Smith (rugby league) (born 1984), English rugby league player
- Byron Smith (American football) (born 1962), American football player
- Byron Smith (basketball) (born 1969), American basketball coach
- Byron Smith (golfer) (born 1981), American golfer
- Byron David Smith, American veteran convicted of murdering burglars at his home
