= Nathan Massey =

Nathan Massey may refer to:

- Nathan Massey (rugby league, born 1989), English rugby league player for the Castleford Tigers
- Nathan Massey (rugby league, born 1991), Scotland international rugby league player
- Nathan Massey (Love Island), winner of a reality TV show
