= Sean Hesketh =

Former Ireland international rugby league footballer

Personal information
- Born: 17 August 1986 (age 39) Pontefract, West Yorkshire, England
- Height: 192 cm (6 ft 4 in)
- Weight: 115 kg (18 st 2 lb)

Playing information
- Position: Prop
Club
Years	Team	Pld	T	G	FG	P
2008–09	Featherstone Rovers	30	6	0	0	24
2009(loan)	→ York City Knights
2010–11	Batley Bulldogs
2012	Halifax
2013–14	Keighley Cougars
2015–16	Batley Bulldogs
2016(loan)	→ Oxford	2
2017	Keighley Cougars
2017	Hunslet
	Total	32	6	0	0	24
Representative
Years	Team	Pld	T	G	FG	P
2010–15	Ireland
- Source: As of 30 November 2016

Sean Hesketh (born 17 August 1986) is an Ireland international rugby league footballer who last played for Hunslet in Kingstone Press League 1. He plays as a prop.

He played at representative level for Ireland, and at club level for Hunslet. He has previously played for Doncaster, Featherstone Rovers, York City Knights, Halifax, Oxford, Batley and Keighley Cougars as a prop.

== Background ==
Hesketh was born in Pontefract, West Yorkshire, England.

== Career ==
He has international appearances for Ireland in the 2010 Alitalia European Cup, 2012 2014 and 2015 European Cup tournaments.
