= Leo Casey =

Ireland international rugby league footballer

Personal information
- Full name: Leo Casey
- Born: 17 September 1965 (age 60)

Playing information
- Position: Prop
Club
Years	Team	Pld	T	G	FG	P
1985–90	Oldham	71	18			72
1990–96	Featherstone Rovers
1996–97	Swinton
1998	Rochdale Hornets
1999–02	Oldham
	Total	71	18	0	0	72
Representative
Years	Team	Pld	T	G	FG	P
1995–97	Ireland	5
- Relatives: Callum Casey (son)

Leo Casey (born 17 September 1965) is a former Ireland international rugby league footballer who played in the 1980s, 1990s and 2000s, and coached in the 2000s. He played at representative level for Ireland, and at club level for Oldham, Featherstone Rovers and Swinton, as a prop, and coached at club level for Oldham (Reserve team).

== Background ==
Leo Casey is the father of the rugby league footballer; Callum Casey, and Sean Casey (born c. 1993 (age 31–32), halfback for Leeds Rhinos (Reserve team c. 2010)), Connor Casey (born c. 1996 (age 28–29), second-row or loose forward for Leeds Rhinos (scholarship c. 2010)) and Patrick Casey (born c. 1998 (age 26–27), Oldham St Annes ARLFC/Oldham St Anne’s ARLFC (Juniors c. 2010)).

== Playing career ==
=== International honours ===
Leo Casey won 5 caps for Ireland in 1995–1997 while at Featherstone Rovers, and Swinton.

=== County Cup Final appearances ===
Leo Casey played at prop (replaced by substitute John Fairbank) in Oldham's 16-24 defeat by Warrington in the 1989 Lancashire Cup Final during the 1989–90 season at Knowsley Road, St. Helens on Saturday 14 October 1989.

=== Division Two Premiership Final appearances ===
Leo Casey played at prop in Featherstone Rovers' 20-16 victory over Workington Town in the Division Two Premiership Final during the 1992–93 season at Old Trafford, Manchester on Wednesday 19 May 1993.
