= Carly Telford =

English footballer

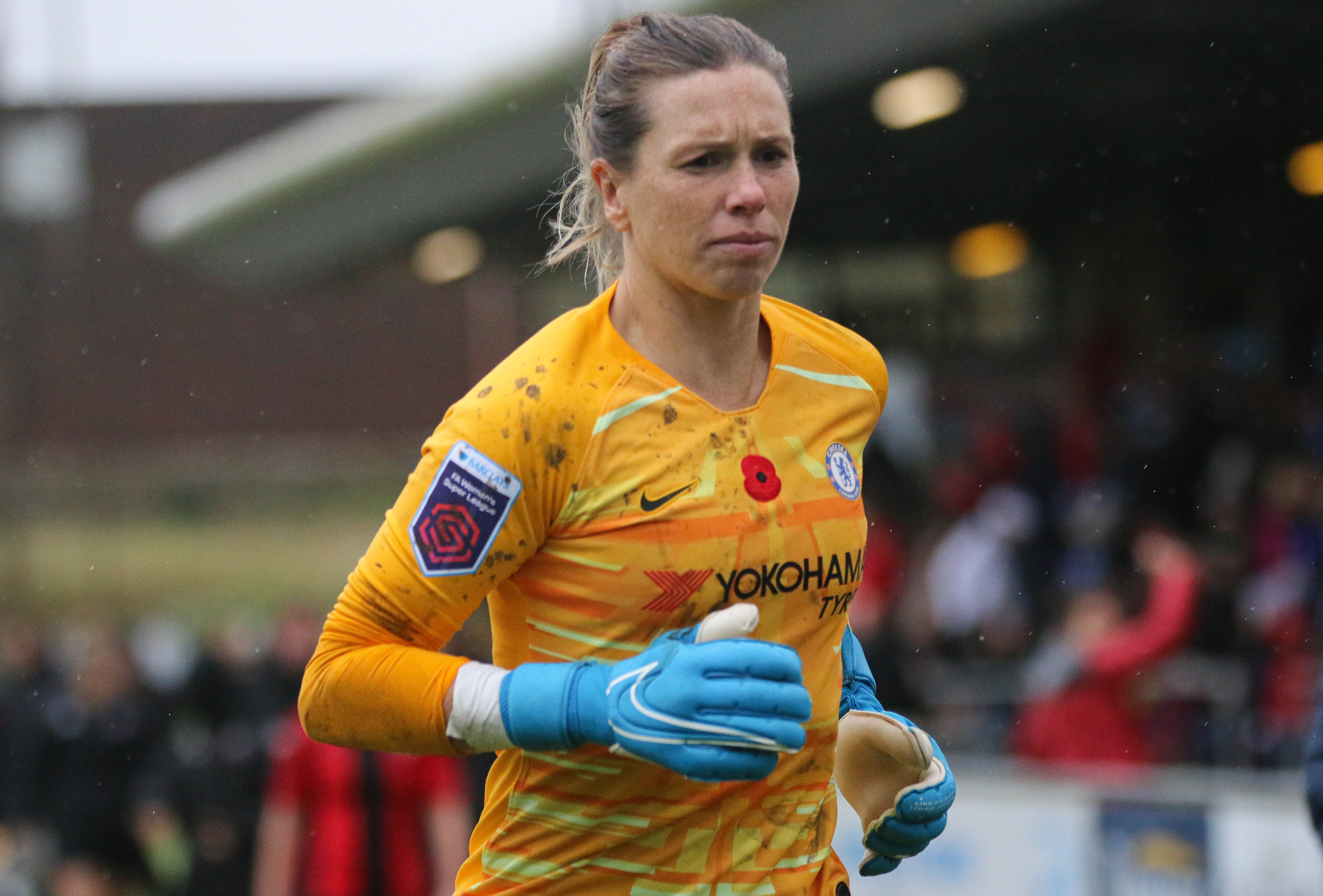
- Carly Telford with Chelsea in 2019

Personal information
- Full name: Carly Mitchell Telford
- Date of birth: 7 July 1987 (age 39)
- Place of birth: County Durham, England
- Height: 5 ft 9 in (1.74 m)
- Position: Goalkeeper

Youth career
- Chester-le-Street
- Newcastle United Academy

Senior career*
Years	Team	Apps	(Gls)
2002–2007	Sunderland		
2007–2010	Leeds Carnegie		
2010–2012	Chelsea	23	(0)
2012–2013	→ Perth Glory (loan)	9	(0)
2013	Chelsea	6	(0)
2014–2017	Notts County	30	(0)
2017–2022	Chelsea	27	(0)
2022	San Diego Wave	4	(0)

International career
2010	England U23	2	(0)
2007–2021	England	28	(0)
Medal record
Women's football
Representing England
FIFA Women's World Cup
Bronze medal – third place	2015 Canada
- * Club domestic league appearances and goals

Carly Mitchell Telford (born 7 July 1987) is an English former professional footballer who played as a goalkeeper.

== Club career ==
Telford joined Leeds United Ladies in 2007 from relegated club Sunderland. In May of that year she had turned out for Charlton Athletic in a tournament in Spain, but Charlton disbanded their women's team shortly afterwards. At Leeds, Telford was named player of the match in the 2008 FA Women's Cup final, after an impressive performance in Leeds' 4–1 defeat to Arsenal.

In summer 2010, Telford was called into the England squad as an unattached player, having left Leeds Carnegie. Matt Beard signed her for Chelsea Ladies ahead of the inaugural 2011 FA WSL season. In October 2012 it was announced that Telford would join Australian club Perth Glory for the 2012–13 winter season.

Telford left Chelsea after three years in December 2013, signing for Notts County ahead of the 2014 FA WSL season. There she was reunited with her former Leeds coach Rick Passmoor and she would have the opportunity to train with goalkeeper coach Kevin Pilkington. Chelsea coach Emma Hayes' decision to hand Telford a free transfer left her shocked and raging.

Telford was carrying a shoulder injury ahead of the 2015 FA Women's Cup Final and Notts County were angry when The Football Association refused their request for dispensation to sign another goalkeeper. Telford recovered to play in the team's 1–0 defeat by Chelsea at Wembley Stadium. She signed a two-year extension to her contract in November 2015.

In June 2016, Telford suffered torn ankle ligaments in a win over Doncaster Belles and was ruled out for three months. Notts County Ladies folded in April 2017 and Telford returned to Chelsea.

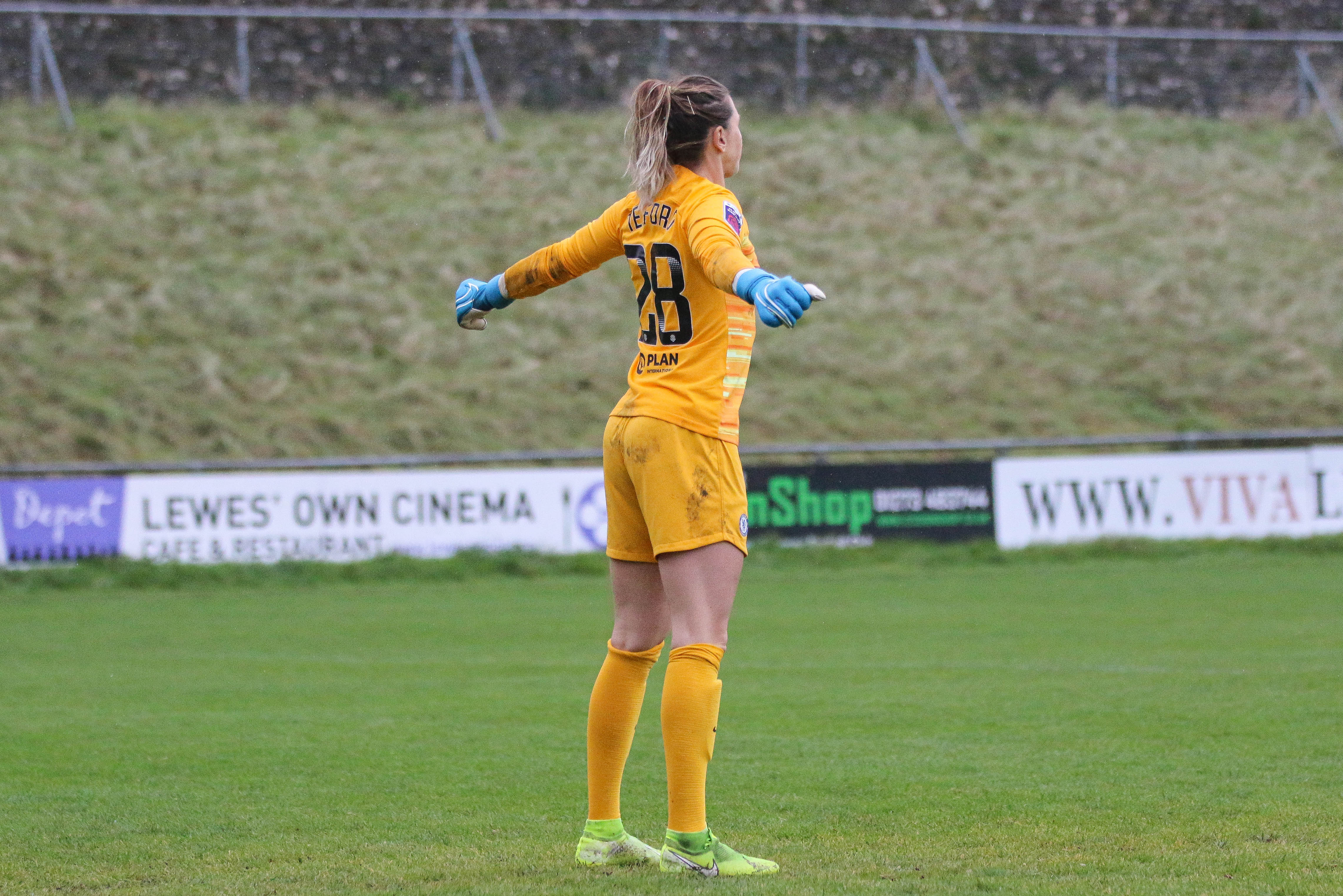
Carly Telford playing for Chelsea in 2019

On 24 January 2022, Chelsea sold Telford to San Diego Wave FC of the National Women's Soccer League.

On 15 March 2023, Telford announced her retirement from football.

== International career ==
England

Telford made her senior international debut on 11 March 2007 as a substitute against Scotland, having previously played at U17, U19, U21 and U23 levels.

In May 2009, Telford was one of the first 17 female players to be given central contracts by The Football Association.

In May 2015, Mark Sampson named Telford in his final squad for the 2015 FIFA Women's World Cup, hosted in Canada. England eventually finished in third place, but Telford was disappointed to be the only member of the squad not to play any minutes at the tournament.

In 2019, Telford was part of the England team that won the SheBelieves Cup in the United States, playing two of the three games against Brazil and Japan. Later that year, Telford was called up by Phil Neville to the 2019 World Cup squad. As part of England's social-media facing squad announcement, her name was announced by Sports Presenter Nicole Holliday.

Having been included in England squads for the 2007 FIFA Women's World Cup, 2015 FIFA Women's World Cup and UEFA Women's Euro 2017 without getting to play, Telford finally got her first minutes at a major tournament on 14 June 2019, starting in England's second group game at the 2019 FIFA Women's World Cup against Argentina.

Telford was allotted 165 when the FA announced their legacy numbers scheme to honour the 50th anniversary of England’s inaugural international.

Great Britain

On 18 June 2021, Telford was called up to replace the injured Karen Bardsley for the delayed 2020 Summer Olympics. This was despite Sandy MacIver being named on the standby list, as Telford had more international experience. However, she was an unused substitute, with Ellie Roebuck playing all four matches, before being knocked out in the quarterfinals.

== Personal life ==
Telford attended Tanfield School, then Gateshead College on the Talented Athlete Scholarship Scheme.

In August 2010, her boyfriend was Matt Barron. Telford publicly came out in 2017. She is in a relationship with England cricketer Georgia Elwiss.

== Career statistics ==
=== International ===
Statistics accurate as of match played 27 July 2021.

Year	England		Great Britain	
Year	Apps	Goals	Apps	Goals
2007	?	?	—N/a	
2008	?	?	—N/a	
2009	?	?	—N/a	
2010	?	?	—N/a	
2011	?	?	—N/a	
2012	?	?	—N/a	
2013	?	?	—N/a	
2014	?	?	—N/a	
2015	?	?	—N/a	
2016	?	?	—N/a	
2017	?	?	—N/a	
2018	?	?	—N/a	
2019	?	?	—N/a	
2020	?	?	—N/a	
2021	?	?	0	0
Total	23	0	0	0

== Honours ==
England

- FIFA Women's World Cup third place: 2015
- SheBelieves Cup: 2019
