= Nathan Massey (rugby league, born 1991) =

Scotland international rugby league footballer

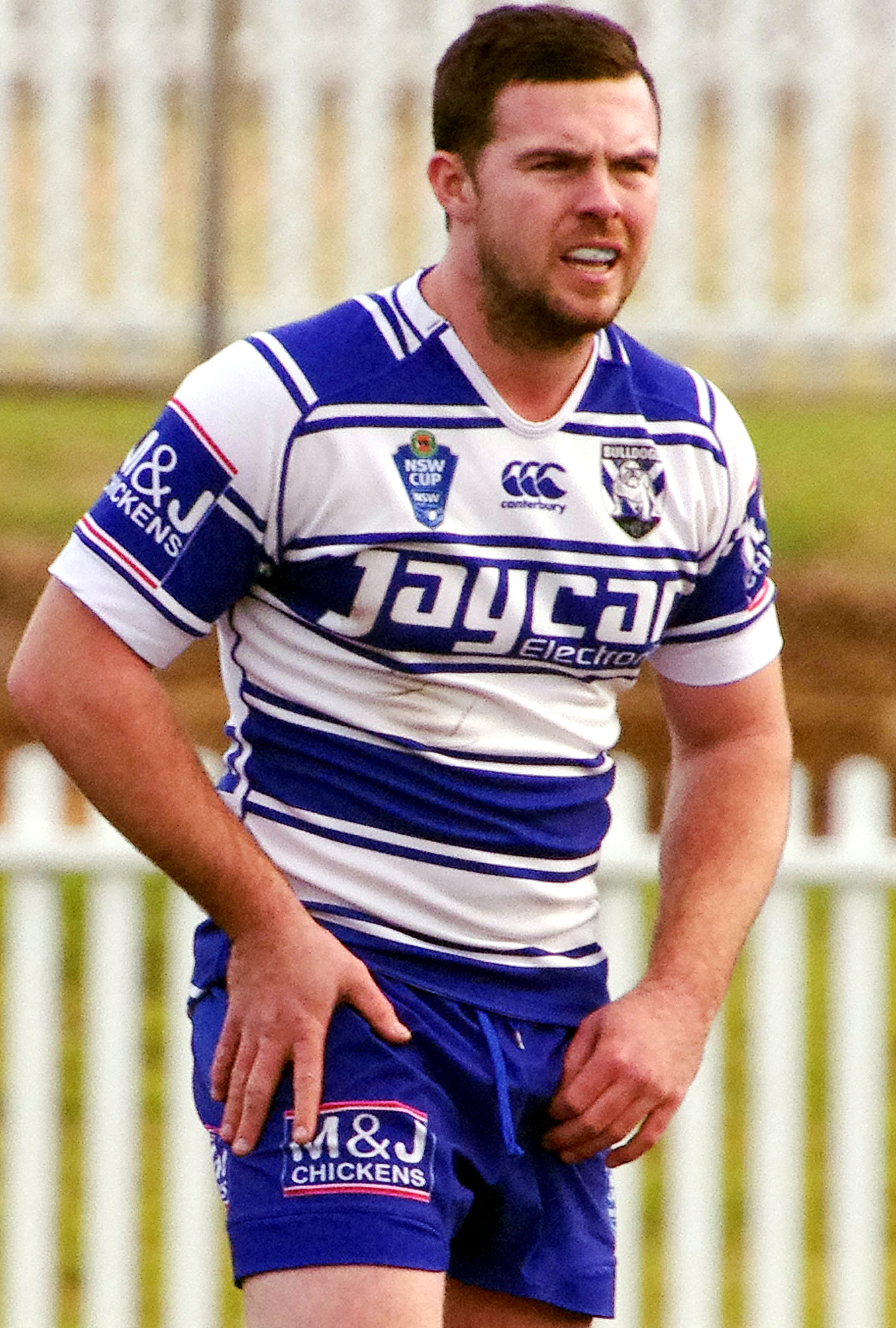

Personal information
- Born: 7 April 1991 (age 34) Lidcombe, New South Wales, Australia

Playing information
- Position: Fullback, Scrum-half
Club
Years	Team	Pld	T	G	FG	P
2011	Canberra Raiders	6	1	0	0	4
Representative
Years	Team	Pld	T	G	FG	P
2014	Scotland	3	0	0	0	0
- Source: As of 31 October 2014

Nathan Massey is a Scotland international rugby league footballer who plays as a fullback. He most recently played at club level as professional for the Canberra Raiders in the NRL.

== Background ==
Massey was born in Lidcombe, New South Wales, Australia. He has Scottish ancestors, and was made eligible to play for Scotland due to the grandparent rule.

== Playing career ==
=== Canterbury-Bankstown Bulldogs ===
Massey played for the Canterbury-Bankstown Bulldogs in the 2010 Toyota Cup.

=== Canberra Raiders ===
Massey debuted at fullback for Canberra in round 9 of the 2011 National Rugby League season against Manly-Warringah following an injury to Josh Dugan, the regular fullback.

=== International ===
Massey has Scotland heritage so he was able to represent the Scottish national team. Scotland's coach Steve McCormack was aware of this and he therefore picked Massey to be a part of his squad in the 2014 European Cup competition. He made his international début, in the tournaments opening game, against Wales.
