= Joe Wardle =

Scotland international rugby league footballer

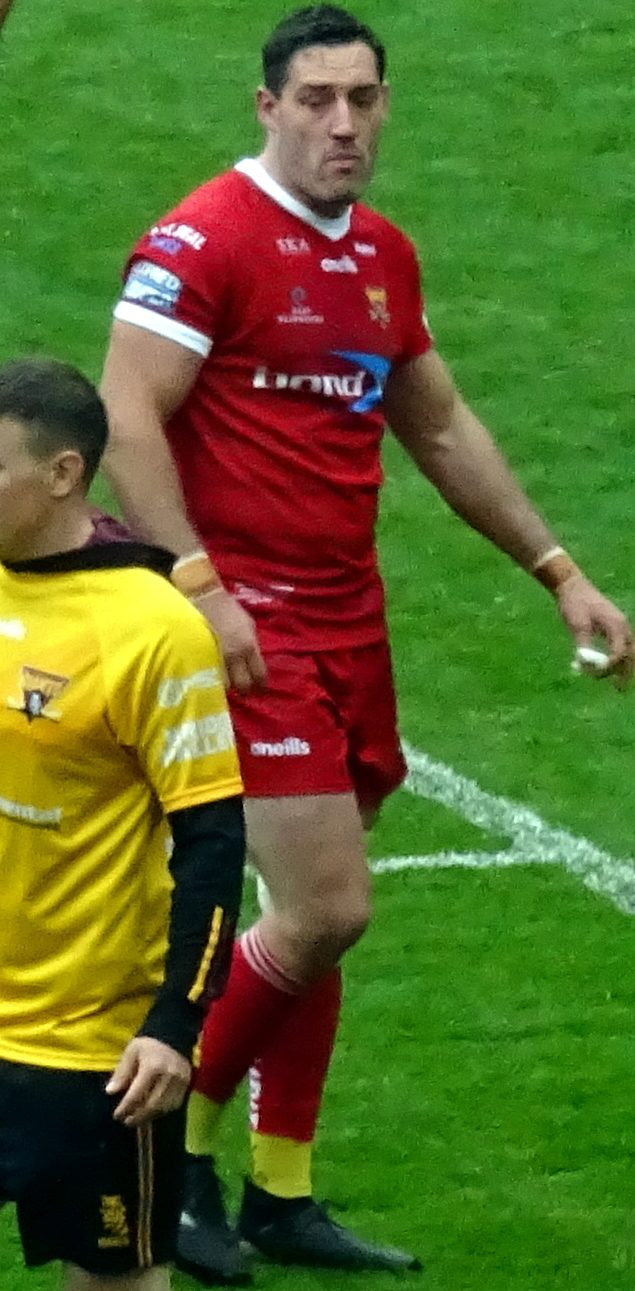

Personal information
- Born: 22 September 1991 (age 35) Halifax, West Yorkshire, England

Playing information
- Height: 6 ft 1 in (1.85 m)
- Weight: 14 st 7 lb (92 kg)
- Position: Centre, Second-row
Club
Years	Team	Pld	T	G	FG	P
2010	Bradford Bulls	3	0	0	0	0
2011–16	Huddersfield Giants	143	64	0	0	256
2011(loan)	→ Barrow Raiders	3	1	0	0	4
2017	Newcastle Knights	17	4	0	0	16
2018–19	Castleford Tigers	18	1	0	0	4
2019(loan)	→ Huddersfield Giants	16	7	0	0	28
2020–21	Huddersfield Giants	13	2	0	0	8
2022–23	Leigh Centurions	38	10	0	0	40
2024	Oldham	14	3	0	0	12
	Total	265	92	0	0	368
Representative
Years	Team	Pld	T	G	FG	P
2010–14	Scotland	6	1	0	0	4
- Relatives: Jake Wardle (brother)

Joe Wardle (born 22 September 1991) is a former Scotland international rugby league footballer who last played as a centre or second-row forward and is currently assistant-coach for the Oldham RLFC in the RFL League 1.

He previously played for the Bradford Bulls, Huddersfield and the Castleford Tigers in the Super League, and the Newcastle Knights in the NRL. He spent time on loan from the Giants at the Barrow Raiders in the Championship in 2011. He has also spent time on loan from Castleford at Huddersfield in the Super League.

== Background ==
Wardle was born in Halifax, West Yorkshire, England.

== Career ==
=== Bradford Bulls ===
Wardle came through the ranks at Bradford Bulls after signing from Illingworth A.R.L.F.C.

Wardle made his début for the Bradford Bulls against Warrington Wolves in the Challenge Cup in May 2010. He débuted in the Super League a week later against the Huddersfield Giants. He made his first start for the club in the next game against Crusaders RL, but suffered an injury which prevented him from establishing a regular place in the first team. He returned to play for the under-20's team after recovering from the injury, but suffered a torn quadriceps, which would keep him out of action for the rest of the season. In September 2010, he rejected a new contract from Bradford, and instead signed for the Huddersfield Giants.

=== Huddersfield Giants ===
In 2011, he spent time on loan at the Barrow Raiders. After performing well in the first half of the season, he was given a two-year contract extension, keeping him at the Galpharm Stadium until the end of 2014. In July 2013, he was rewarded with a further contract extension until 2017. He was named the 2014 Huddersfield Giants season's player of the year.

=== Newcastle Knights ===
During the 2016 season, Wardle signed a contract with National Rugby League side the Newcastle Knights, starting in 2018. However, he was able to gain a release in December to join the Newcastle Knights a year early ahead of the 2017 season, on a 3-year contract.

He made his Newcastle Knights début in round 4 of the 2017 season against the Penrith Panthers.

=== Castleford Tigers ===
Wardle only played 17 matches for the Newcastle Knights after becoming homesick and gaining a release to return to England on a 3-year contract with Super League side the Castleford Tigers.

=== Leigh Centurions ===
On 15 October 2021, it was reported that he had signed for Leigh Centurions in the RFL Championship In round 2 of the 2023 Super League season, Wardle suffered an arm injury in the clubs 14-6 loss against the Catalans Dragons. Wardle was later ruled out for an indefinite period. In round 20 of the 2023 Super League season, Wardle made his return to the Leigh side as they were defeated by rivals Wigan 44-18. Wardle played 11 games for Leigh in the 2023 Super League season as the club finished fifth on the table and qualified for the playoffs. He played in their elimination playoff loss against Hull Kington Rovers.

=== Oldham RLFC ===
On 10 September 2023, it was reported that he had signed for Oldham RLFC in the RFL League 1 on a two-year deal as player/assistant-coach.

== International career ==
In October and November 2013, he played for Scotland in their 2013 Rugby League World Cup campaign.

In October and November 2014, he played in the 2014 European Cup competition.
