= Tony Maurel =

France international rugby league footballer

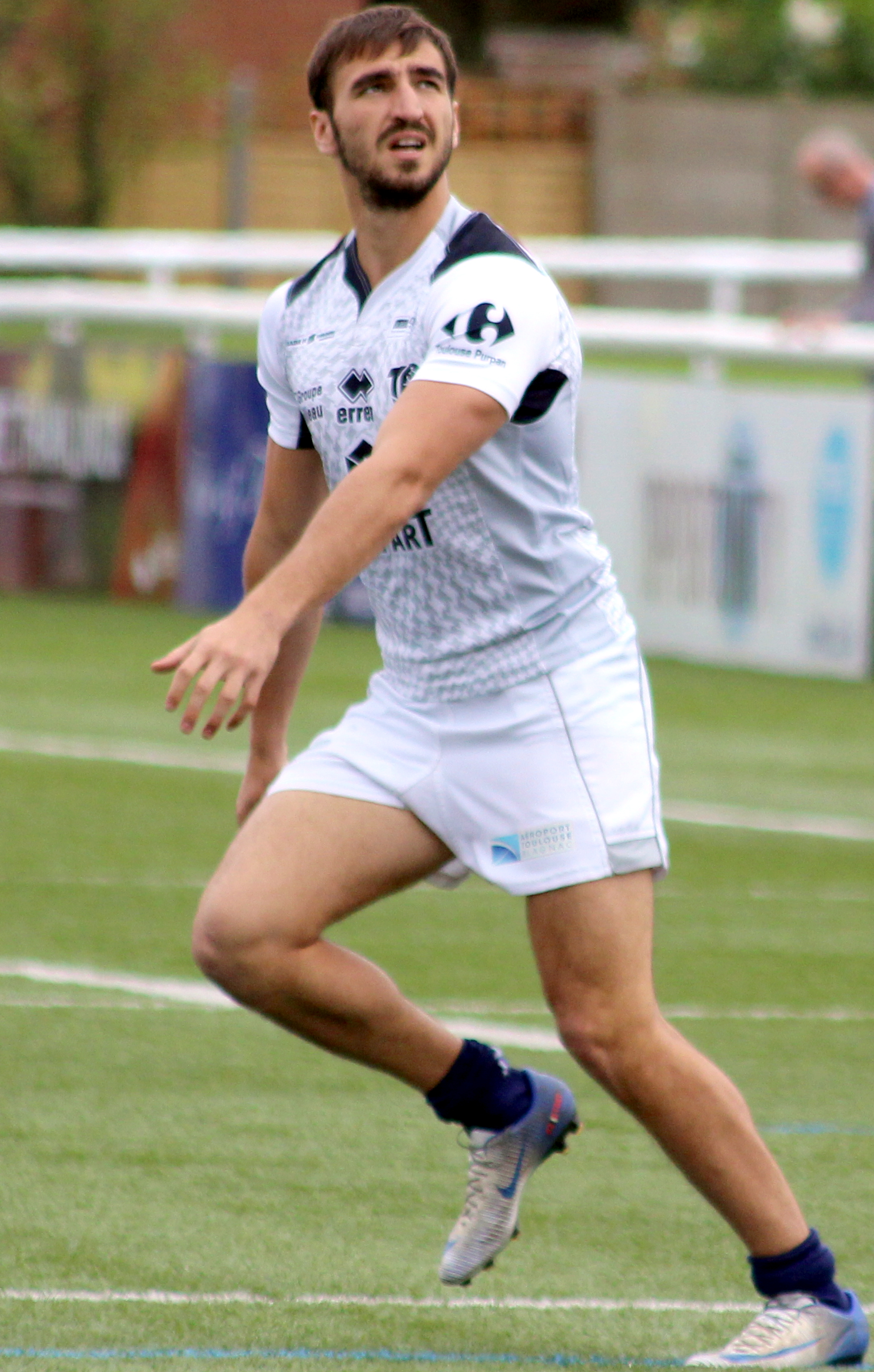

Personal information
- Full name: Anthony Maurel
- Born: 21 April 1993 (age 33) Saint-Léon, Haute-Garonne, Occitania, France
- Height: 5 ft 10 in (1.78 m)
- Weight: 12 st 10 lb (81 kg)

Playing information
- Position: Wing, Fullback
Club
Years	Team	Pld	T	G	FG	P
2016–20	Toulouse Olympique	90	51	18	0	238
2021–	Limoux Grizzlies	78	26	6	0	116
	Total	168	77	24	0	354
Representative
Years	Team	Pld	T	G	FG	P
2014–	France	2	2	0	0	8
- Source: As of 25 October 2022

Tony Maurel (born 21 April 1993) is a French professional rugby league footballer who plays as a fullback or on the wing for the Limoux Grizzlies in the Elite One Championship and France at international level.

Maurel has previously played for Ayguevives, Belberaud Ramonville and the Toulouse Olympique Broncos and Toulouse Olympique in the Championship.

== Background ==
Maurel was born in Saint-Léon, Haute-Garonne, France.

== Career ==
On 22 July 2020 it was announced that Maurel would leave Toulouse Olympique.
