= Matt Barron =

Wales international rugby league footballer

Personal information
- Full name: Matthew Barron
- Born: 17 November 1986 (age 39) Durham, England
- Height: 185 cm (6 ft 1 in)
- Weight: 106 kg (16 st 10 lb)

Playing information
- Position: Prop, Second-row
Club
Years	Team	Pld	T	G	FG	P
2007–17	Newcastle Thunder	115	16	1	0	8
2021	Toronto Wolfpack	1	0	0	0	0
	Total	116	16	1	0	8
Representative
Years	Team	Pld	T	G	FG	P
2008–17	Wales	9	0	0	0	0

Coaching information
Representative
Years	Team	Gms	W	D	L	W%
202?–	Canada	0	0	0	0
- Source: As of 21 December 2025

Matt Barron (born 17 November 1986) is a former Wales international rugby league footballer who played in the 2000s and 2010s. He played at representative level for Wales, and at club level for the Newcastle Thunder (previously Gateshead Thunder) in League 1, as a prop or second-row. He announced his retirement from rugby league on 7 February 2018.

He is the current head coach of Canada (Women).

== Early and personal life ==
Born in Durham, England, Barron is of Welsh descent from his Rhondda-born mother. He played his community rugby league for the Gateshead Panthers. He was previously in a relationship with England goalkeeper Carly Telford.

== Club career ==
On 20 Sep 2021 it was reported that Matt had come out of retirement to play for Toronto Wolfpack, in their first fixture since their Super League exit, versus Washington DC Cavalry in the inaugural Canada Cup competition. He was named as captain.

== International career ==
Barron was named in the Wales squad to face England at the Keepmoat Stadium prior to England's departure for the 2008 World Cup. He played for Wales in the 2009 European Cup, 2014 European Cup and 2015 European Cup tournaments.

On 10 October 2017, Barron was named in Wales' 24-man squad for the 2017 World Cup.
