= Haydn Peacock =

Ireland international rugby league footballer

Personal information
- Full name: Haydn Peacock
- Born: 5 February 1991 (age 34); Greenacre, New South Wales, Australia

Playing information
- Position: Fullback, Wing, Centre, Second-row
Club
Years	Team	Pld	T	G	FG	P
2006–12	Cronulla Sharks	0	0	0	0	0
2013	South Wales Scorpions	0	0	0	0	0
2013–14	Limoux Grizzlies	0	0	0	0	0
2014	AS Carcassonne	0	0	0	0	0
	Total	0	0	0	0	0
Representative
Years	Team	Pld	T	G	FG	P
2014	Ireland	6	4	0	0	16
- As of 22 Jul 2021

Haydn Peacock (born 5 February 1991) is an Ireland international professional rugby league player, often playing as a Centre, Wing, Fullback early in his career, but more recently as a Second-row. Born in Australia, he played for the Cronulla Sharks between 2006 and 2012 before signing with the South Wales Scorpions for 2013. He has played in France for Limoux Grizzlies in 2013-14 followed by AS Carcassonne since 2014, and international matches for Ireland since October 2014.

== Early life ==
Peacock was born in Greenacre, New South Wales, a suburb of Sydney, and grew up in Yarrawarrah. His grandparents emigrated to Australia and he holds an Irish passport, therefore being eligible for Ireland

== Domestic rugby ==
He played for Yarrawarrah Tigers from ages 8 to 17 alongside teammates Stewart Mills and Chad Townsend, he began with Cronulla Sharks in 2007 playing Harold Matthews Cup and signing his first contract that same year before moving up through the grades. In 2012, he played in an NRL trial match against the Manly Sea Eagles. He signed for South Wales Scorpions in 2013, and played one season in the Championship 1 which plays throughout England and Wales.

He moved to France in August 2013, and joined Limoux Grizzlies and then AS Carcassonne in 2014. He suffered a penile injury in a tackle while playing for Carcassonne against Saint-Estève XIII Catalan, the reserve team of Catalans Dragons, on 7 February 2016. He had scored the first try of the match in the first half, but was substituted at half time when the extent of his injury became clear, and his team eventually lost. The partial dismemberment required 11 stitches, but he played in the next match with protective strapping.

== International career ==
Peacock qualifies for the Ireland national rugby league team through his grandparents. He scored two tries on his international debut in the 2014 European Cup against France on 18 October 2014, and then scored against Scotland on 2 November 2014. He also played for Ireland in the 2015 European Cup.

In 2016 he was called up to the Ireland squad for the 2017 Rugby League World Cup European Pool B qualifiers.
