= Joshua Toole =

Ireland international rugby league footballer

Josh Toole
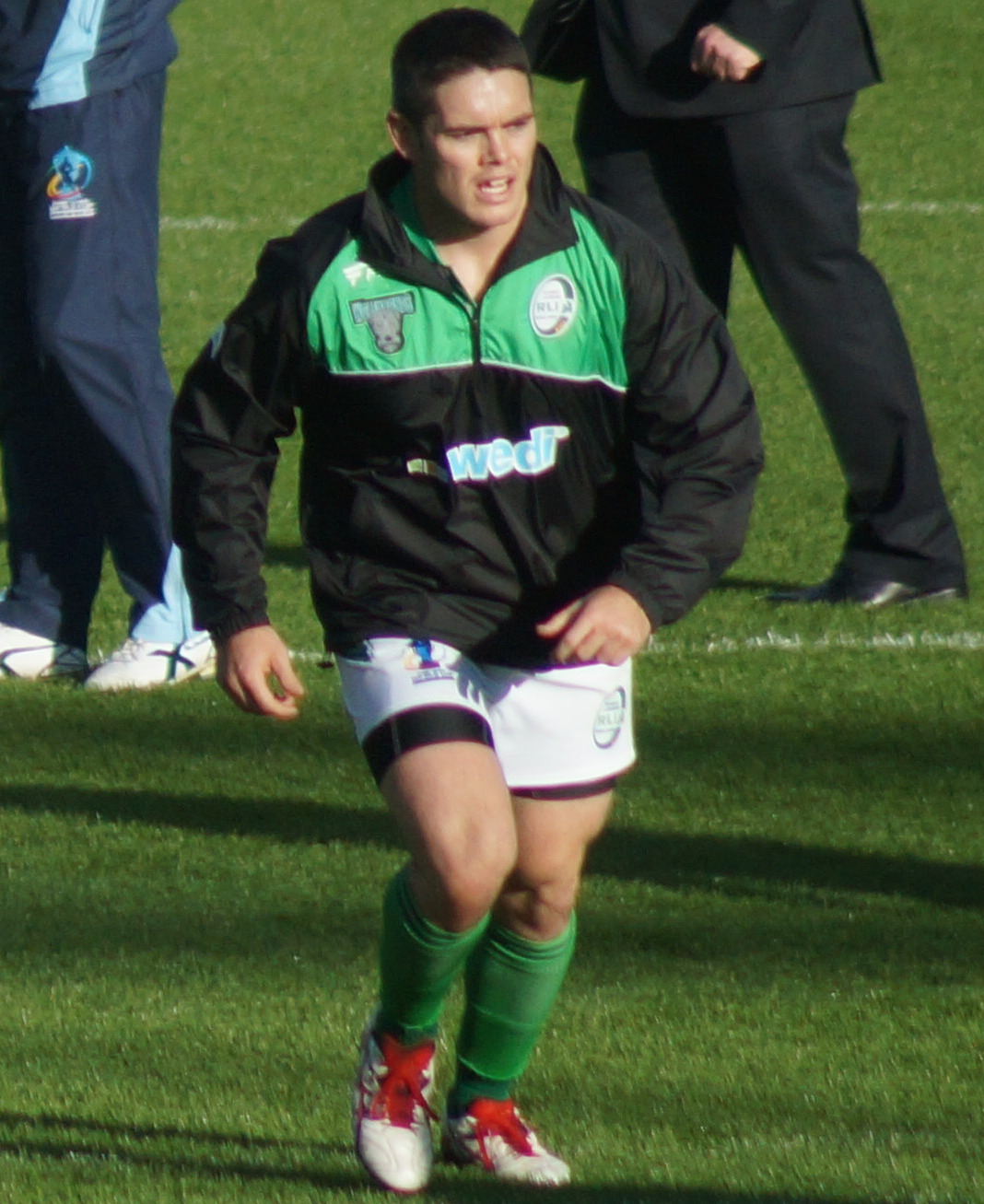

Personal information
- Full name: Joshua Toole
- Born: 11 September 1989 (age 37) Bathurst, New South Wales, Australia

Playing information
- Position: Centre, Second-row
Club
Years	Team	Pld	T	G	FG	P
2017	Mount Pritchard Mounties
2018	Sheffield Eagles	24	8	0	0	32
2019–	Forbes Magpies
	Total	24	8	0	0	32
Representative
Years	Team	Pld	T	G	FG	P
2012–14	Ireland	6	1	0	0	4
- Source: As of 1 February 2019

Joshua Toole is an Ireland international rugby league footballer who plays as a centre for the Forbes Magpies in the Group 11 Premiership.

== Background ==
Toole was born in Bathurst, New South Wales, Australia.

== Playing career ==
He has also previously played for the Illawarra Cutters, a feeder team for St. George Illawarra Dragons, and the Mount Pritchard Mounties. Toole was part of the Ireland squad at the 2013 Rugby League World Cup., as well as in the 2012 and 2014 European Cup competitions. He played in Ireland's first match against France, and won himself the Man of the Match award.

In 2018, the centre moved to England to sign for Sheffield, and join up with his former coach at Ireland Mark Aston.

Toole holds an Irish passport despite being born in Australia.
