= Rémy Marginet =

France international rugby league footballer

Remy Marginet
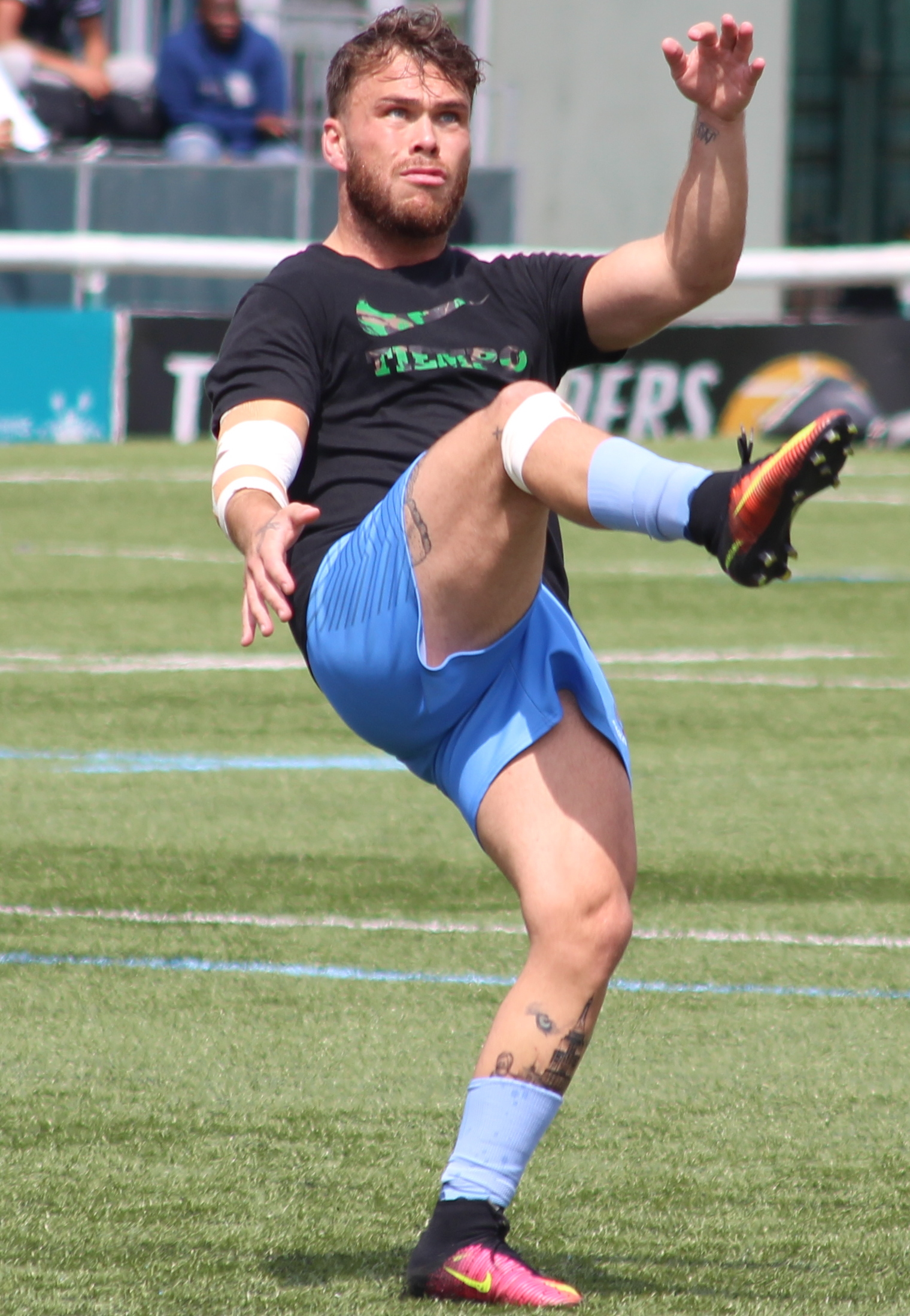

Personal information
- Full name: Rémy Marginet
- Born: 27 May 1989 (age 37) Saint-Estève, Pyrénées-Orientales, Languedoc-Roussillon, France
- Height: 5 ft 9 in (1.75 m)
- Weight: 12 st 8 lb (80 kg)

Playing information
- Position: Scrum-half
Club
Years	Team	Pld	T	G	FG	P
2007–12	AS Saint Estève	32	4	74	0	164
2011–12	Catalans Dragons	2	0	9	0	18
2014	Palau Broncos	23	10	60	0	160
2015	Featherstone Rovers	15	8	11	2	56
2015–17	AS Saint Estève	29	10	4	0	48
2017	Sheffield Eagles	9	3	0	0	12
2018	Palau Broncos	8	4	23	1	63
2018–19	Newcastle Thunder	21	10	62	1	125
2022	Lézignan Sangliers
2023	Ille-sur-Têt XIII
	Total	139	49	243	4	646
Representative
Years	Team	Pld	T	G	FG	P
2014–17	France	7	5	20	0	60
- Source: As of 4 April 2023

Rémy Marginet is a French rugby league footballer who plays as a scrum-half for Ille-sur-Têt XIII in Elite Two Championship. He is a French international.

== Playing career ==
He has previously played for the Catalans Dragons, Featherstone Rovers, Newcastle Thunder and Palau Broncos and his home town club AS Saint Estève. Marginet was briefly signed by Hemel Stags, but the move did not happen and he never played for the Stags. He instead moved to the Sheffield Eagles, where he made nine appearances and scored three tries. After his spell in England, Marginet returned to his home country and former club the Palau Broncos.

He played for France in the 2014 European Cup. He finished as the tournament's top points scorer, scoring 5 tries and kicking 14 goals. He played for France again in 2015, representing them in a test match against England and in the 2015 European Cup tournament. He also traveled to Australia as part of the French squad for the 2017 World cup as a replacement for Guillaume Bonnet, he scored a two point goal kick in a 6-52 defeat by Australia. Marginet made his debut for Newcastle Thunder on 27 May 2018 when playing against Workington Town in a game that they lost 38-18 but Marginet scored two tries himself.
