= Lewis Reece =

Wales international dual code rugby footballer

Lewis Korma Reece
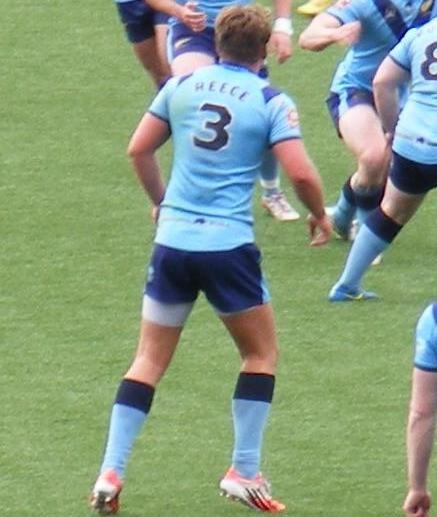

Personal information
- Full name: Lewis Ivor Reece
- Born: 17 June 1991 (age 34) Cardiff, Wales
- Height: 190 cm (6 ft 3 in)
- Weight: 110 kg (17 st 5 lb)

Playing information

Rugby league
- Position: Second-row, Centre, Wing, Fullback
Club
Years	Team	Pld	T	G	FG	P
2010–13	South Wales Scorpions	32	11	72	0	188
2013–16	Gloucestershire All Golds	56	15	3	0	50
2017	South Wales Ironmen	5	2	0	0	8
2017	Gloucestershire All Golds	14	3	0	0	12
2018	Whitehaven	10	2	0	0	0
2019–	West Wales Raiders	0	0	0	0	0
	Total	117	33	75	0	258
Representative
Years	Team	Pld	T	G	FG	P
2010–	Wales	8	1	6	0	16

Rugby union
Club
Years	Team	Pld	T	G	FG	P
2011	Pontypridd	1	0	0	0	0
2012–13	Cardiff	4	0	0	0	0
2012–13	Bridgend Ravens	5	0	0	0	0
	Total	10	0	0	0	0
- Source: As of 31 December 2020

Lewis Ivor Reece (born 17 June 1991) is a Welsh professional rugby league footballer who plays at Second-row, Centre, Wing, Fullback for West Wales Raiders in the Championship.

== Playing career ==
He has previously played for the South Wales Scorpions, Kingston Press Championship-1 side Gloucestershire All Golds.

== International ==
He has played at representative level for Great Britain and Wales at Under-18's and Wales first team level.

In October 2014, Lewis was called up to the Wales national rugby league team along with 3 other players to replace the Garreth Carvell and Rob Massam withdrawals from the 2014 European Cup squad. He kicked 1 goal out of two attempts in his country's opening game against Scotland. He kicked 3 goals in the following game against France and then 1 game in the final game of the tournament against Ireland.

In October 2015, Lewis was once again called up by Welsh national team coach John Kear to play in the 2015 European Cup tournament. He appeared in all 3 of the Welsh games which included scoring a try in the final game against Ireland.

He now owns a fish and chips shop In Amroth, Pembrokshire.
