= Clément Soubeyras =

Former France international rugby league footballer

Personal information
- Full name: Clément Soubeyras
- Born: Marsailles, France
- Height: 176 cm (5 ft 9 in)
- Weight: 82 kg (12 st 13 lb)

Playing information
- Position: Fullback, Wing
Club
Years	Team	Pld	T	G	FG	P
2008–11	RC Carpentras XIII	51	31	0	0	124
2011–13	Pia Donkeys	36	35	0	0	140
2013–	AS Carcassonne	145	95	0	0	381
	Total	232	161	0	0	645
Representative
Years	Team	Pld	T	G	FG	P
2012–14	France	6	3	0	0	12
- Source: As of 4 April 2023 (UTC)

Clément Soubeyras is a French rugby league footballer who plays for AS Carcassonne in the Elite One Championship. He plays as a fullback or wing.

== Playing career ==
Soubeyras made his senior debut for Carpentras XIII in 2008. He left the club in 2011 and moved to Pia Donkeys, before joining AS Carcassonne in 2013.

=== International career ===
Soubeyras represented France at junior level. He was called into the senior squad and made his debut against Wales in 2012.

He was named in the France squad for the 2013 Rugby League World Cup, however he was forced to pull out due to injury prior to the tournament and was replaced by Benjamin Garcia.

Soubeyras played in the 2014 European Cup.
