= Shannon McDonnell (rugby league) =

Ireland international rugby league footballer

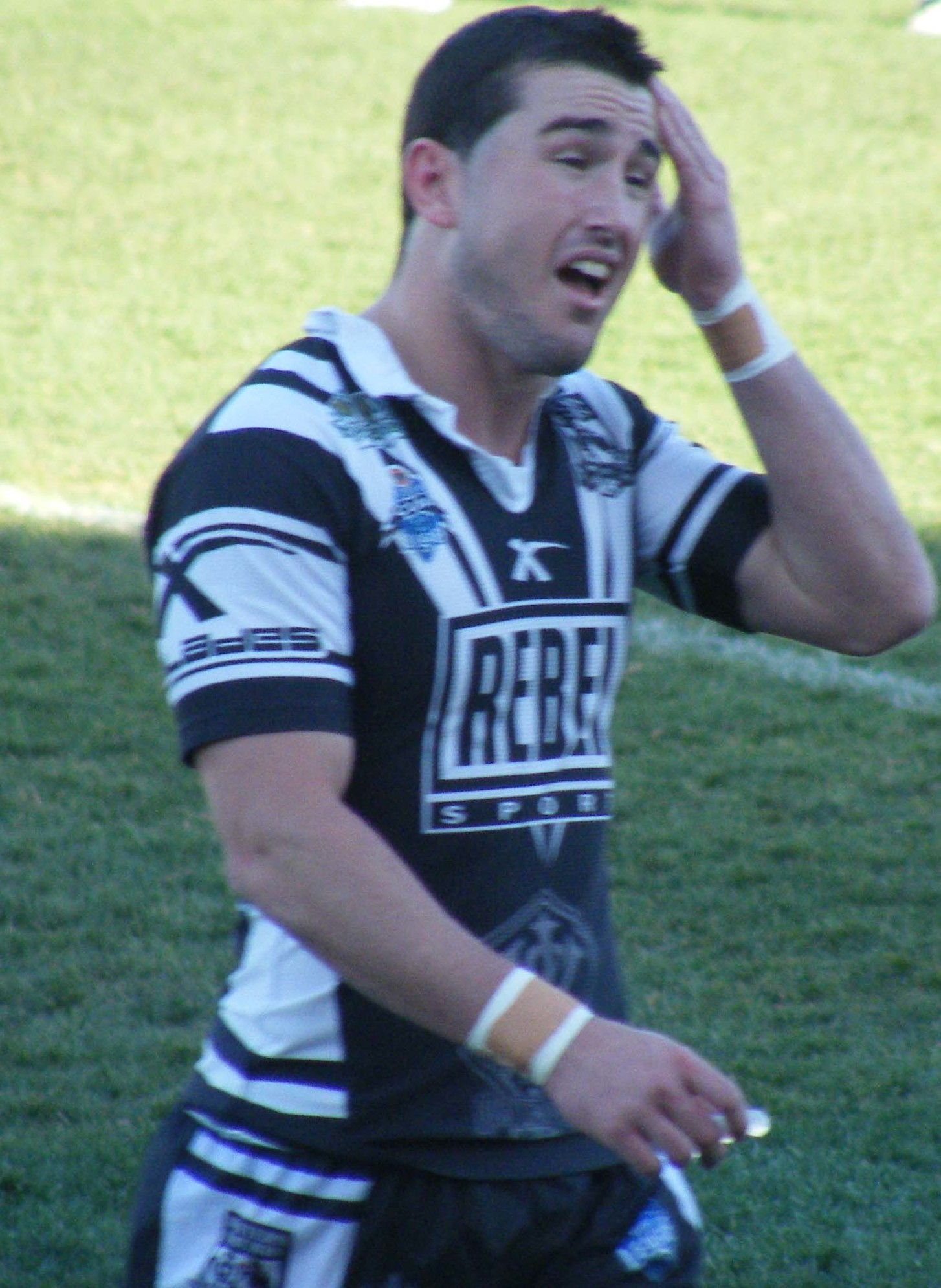

Personal information
- Full name: Shannon Jay McDonnell
- Born: 5 August 1987 (age 39) Camden, New South Wales, Australia
- Height: 181 cm (5 ft 11 in)
- Weight: 86 kg (13 st 8 lb)

Playing information
- Position: Fullback, Wing
Club
Years	Team	Pld	T	G	FG	P
2005–09	Wests Tigers	31	8	0	0	32
2009–11	Newcastle Knights	29	7	0	0	28
2012	Hull Kingston Rovers	22	6	0	0	24
2013–14	Hull F.C.	22	4	0	0	16
2014–16	St Helens	29	15	0	0	60
	Total	133	40	0	0	160
Representative
Years	Team	Pld	T	G	FG	P
2012	Exiles	1	0	0	0	0
2014–17	Ireland	6	3	0	0	12
- Source: As of 30 January 2019

Shannon Jay McDonnell (born 5 August 1987) is a former Ireland international rugby league footballer who last played for St Helens in the Super League. He had previously played for National Rugby League clubs the Wests Tigers and the Newcastle Knights, and in the Super League for Hull Kingston Rovers and Hull FC. He primarily played as a fullback and as a wing.

== Background ==
McDonnell was born in Camden, New South Wales, Australia. McDonnell is of Irish descent and attended Mount Carmel High School and Westfields Sports High School, while playing his junior football for All Saints Liverpool. He was then signed by the Wests Tigers. He is the son of Wests Tigers Recruitment Manager Warren McDonnell.

== Playing career ==
=== Early career ===
In 2004, McDonnell played for the New South Wales Under-17s team. The next season, he played for the New South Wales Under-19s team and made his NRL début for the Wests Tigers against the Penrith Panthers in Round 26 of the 2005 NRL season.

=== Wests Tigers ===
Having played one game for Tigers in 2005, McDonnell was named as the probable replacement for winger Pat Richards, if he was unable to overcome an ankle injury, to take his place in the 2005 NRL Grand Final team.

In 2006, McDonnell played on the wing in the Tigers' 30–10 loss to Super League champions Bradford Bulls in the 2006 World Club Challenge, and also played for the New South Wales Under-19s team and Junior Kangaroos.

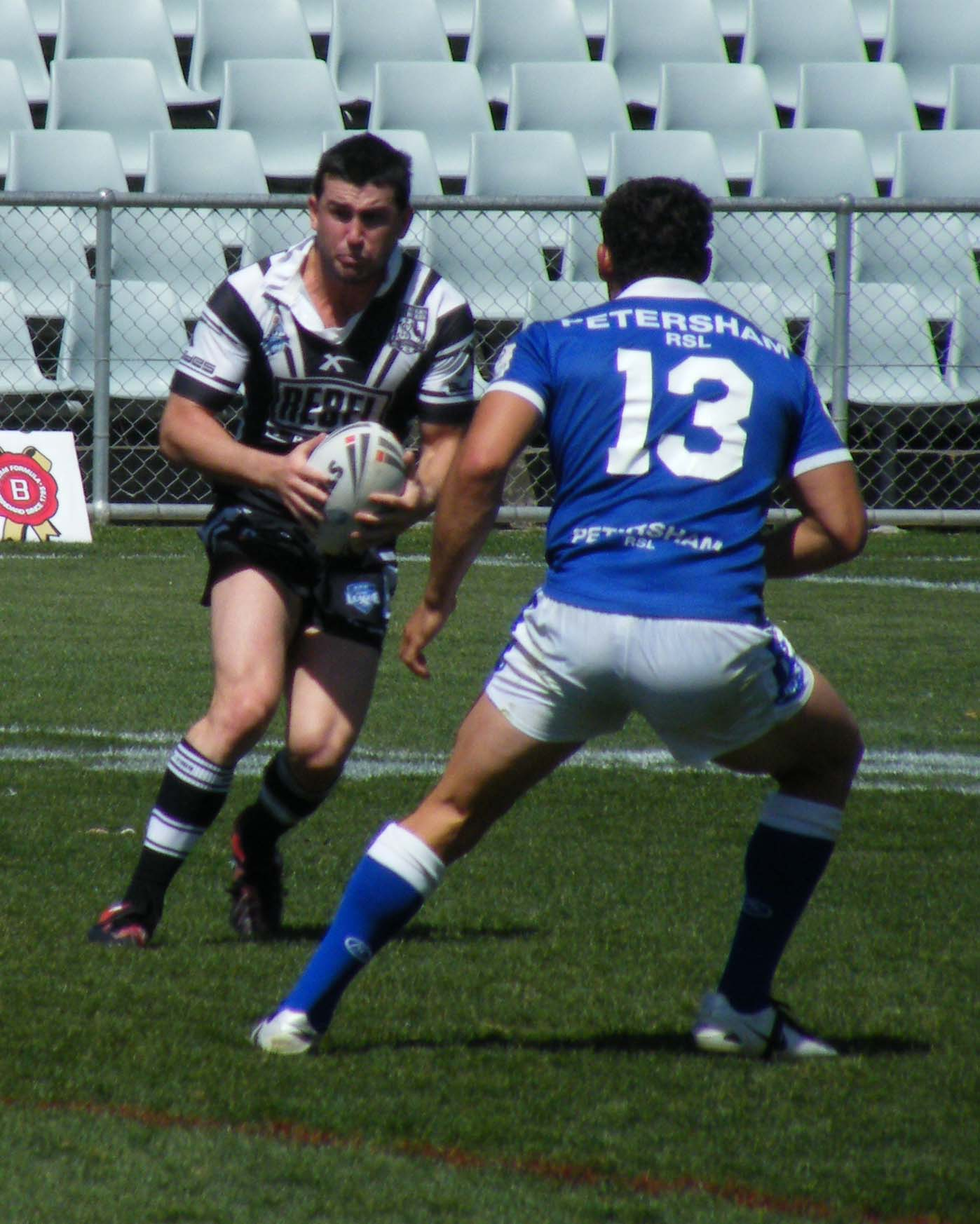
McDonnell playing for the Western Suburbs Magpies in 2008

In 2008, McDonnell made himself available for Ireland's 2008 Rugby League World Cup campaign. Although named in the Ireland training squad for the World Cup, he was forced to withdraw through injury.

=== Newcastle Knights ===
On 7 May 2009, McDonnell joined the Newcastle Knights mid-season for the remainder of the year, after being released from his Tigers contract.

At the conclusion of the 2011 NRL season, McDonnell joined Hull KR in the English Super League.

=== Hull Kingston Rovers ===
At the beginning of 2012, McDonnell joined Hull Kingston Rovers in the Super League on a 1-year contract, following his former Knights assistant coach Craig Sandercock.

In June 2012, McDonnell played for the Exiles.

=== Hull F.C. ===
On 26 October 2012, McDonnell signed a 2-year contract with Hull KR's cross city rival team in Hull FC, starting in 2013. In his first year at the club, he helped the team to the 2013 Challenge Cup Final against the Wigan Warriors where they were defeated 16–0.

=== St Helens ===
On 3 July 2014, McDonnell joined St Helens mid-season for the remainder of the year, after resigning from his Hull F.C. contract.

In October and November 2014, McDonnell played for Ireland in the 2014 European Cup. He scored two tries on début as Ireland beat France 22–12 in their European Cup opener.

On 5 January 2015, McDonnell signed a train and trial contract to return to his first club Wests Tigers, in the hope of impressing for a second-tier contract.

On 30 April 2015, McDonnell rejoined St Helens effective immediately on a 2-year contract.

In 2016, he was called up to the Ireland squad for the 2017 Rugby League World Cup European Pool B qualifiers.

=== Camden Rams ===
McDonnell played for the Camden Rams in 2017.

In October 2017, Shannon was called up to the Ireland squad for the 2017 Rugby League World Cup.
