= Josh Barlow (rugby league) =

Former Scotland international rugby league footballer

Personal information
- Full name: Joshua Barlow
- Born: 15 May 1991 (age 34); Halifax, West Yorkshire, England
- Height: 6 ft 0 in (183 cm)
- Weight: 16 st 0 lb (102 kg)

Playing information
- Position: Hooker, Second-row
Club
Years	Team	Pld	T	G	FG	P
2011–12	Halifax	12	1	0	0	4
2013–18	Swinton Lions	127	16	0	0	64
	Total	139	17	0	0	68
Representative
Years	Team	Pld	T	G	FG	P
2011–14	Scotland	7	1	0	0	4
- Source: As of 17 December 2017
- Relatives: Sam Barlow (brother)

Josh Barlow (born 15 May 1991) is a former Scotland international rugby league footballer who played for Halifax and the Swinton Lions.

== Background ==
Barlow was born in Halifax, West Yorkshire, England.

== Playing career ==
Barlow started playing rugby league with amateur side King Cross before joining Wigan at the age of 16. He played in the club's academy sides, but failed to make a first-team appearance. He then moved to Australia, where he played in the Illawarra League where he played for Berkeley Eagles and Collegians clubs, but returned to Britain later that year and joined Huddersfield. In autumn 2010, he signed for hometown club Halifax. Barlow left Halifax at the end of the 2012 season to join Swinton.

=== International ===
Barlow is a Scotland international, having made his début in 2011. Although not initially named in their squad for the 2013 Rugby League World Cup, he was later called up as a replacement for the injured Jonathan Walker.

In October and November 2014, Barlow played in the 2014 European Cup competition. He played in all of Scotland's fixtures.
