= Ashley Bateman =

Wales international rugby league player & coach

Personal information
- Full name: Ashley Bateman
- Born: 11 February 1990 (age 35); Rhondda Cynon Taf, Wales
- Height: 180 cm (5 ft 11 in)
- Weight: 89 kg (14 st 0 lb)

Playing information
- Position: Centre, Wing
Club
Years	Team	Pld	T	G	FG	P
2009	Crusaders RL	1	0	0	0	0
2010–14	South Wales Scorpions	101	9	0	0	36
2017	South Wales Scorpions	8	0	0	0	0
2018	West Wales Raiders	1	0	0	0	0
2018	Coventry Bears	13	1	0	0	4
2019–21	West Wales Raiders	13	1	0	0	4
	Total	137	11	0	0	44
Representative
Years	Team	Pld	T	G	FG	P
2009–14	Wales	7	3	0	0	12

Coaching information
Club
Years	Team	Gms	W	D	L	W%
2022–	West Wales Raiders
- Source: As of 28 February 2022

Ashley Bateman (born 2 November 1990) is a former Welsh international rugby league footballer and coach who played as a wing and was the head coach for West Wales Raiders in League 1. He was previously playing for the Crusaders RL in the Super League.

He previously played for feeder side Crusaders Colts in the National Conference before signing professionally in 2008. He made an appearance for the Crusaders (then Celtic Crusaders) in a 35–22 defeat by the Castleford Tigers in round 27 of 2009's Super League XIV. He has also represented his native Wales at international level. He made his international début in an 88–8 win over Serbia in the European Cup. He since played against Ireland, in a 42–12 win, and in the 28–16 victory against Scotland in the final, each time playing on the wing and scoring in every game.

In October and November 2014, Ashley played international rugby league for the first time in 5-years. He returned after being selected to play in the 2014 European Cup.
