= Izaak Duffy =

Welsh rugby league footballer

Personal information
- Born: 16 February 1989 (age 36); Llangors, Powys, Wales
- Height: 184 cm (6 ft 0 in)
- Weight: 110 kg (17 st 5 lb)

Playing information
- Position: Prop
Club
Years	Team	Pld	T	G	FG	P
2014–15	Gloucestershire All Golds	30	2			8
2016–17	South Wales Scorpions RLFC	24	2			8
	Total	54	4	0	0	16
Representative
Years	Team	Pld	T	G	FG	P
2014	Wales	2	0			0

Izaak Duffy (born 16 February 1989) is a Welsh rugby league footballer who currently plays for the West Wales Raiders in Kingstone Press League 1. He plays as prop.

Duffy is a Welsh international, playing in the 2014 European Championships, making his début against Scotland in Workington.
