= Callum Phillips =

Scotland international rugby league footballer

Personal information
- Born: 19 February 1992 (age 34) Whitehaven, Cumbria, England

Playing information
- Position: Scrum-half, Hooker
Club
Years	Team	Pld	T	G	FG	P
2013–17	Workington Town	112	24	0	0	96
2018–	Whitehaven	83	34	0	0	136
2025–	Workington Town	11	1	0	0	4
	Total	206	59	0	0	236
Representative
Years	Team	Pld	T	G	FG	P
2014–17	Scotland	6	2	0	0	8
- Source: As of 11 June 2025
- Relatives: Brett Phillips (brother)

Callum Phillips (born 19 February 1992) is a Scotland international rugby league footballer who plays as a hooker or scrum-half for Workington Town in the RFL Championship.

== Background ==
Phillips was born in Whitehaven, Cumbria, England.

== Club career ==
Born in Whitehaven, Phillips started his career as an amateur playing for Seaton. He was named Gillette National Youth League player of the year in 2010. In November 2012, he signed a professional contract with Workington Town.

He joined Whitehaven R.L.F.C. and played for them for several seasons before re-joining Workington Town in January 2025.

== Representative career ==
As an amateur, Phillips played for England Community Lions under-18s. He is eligible to play for Scotland through his grandparents, and was called up to their squad for the 2013 Rugby League World Cup following the withdrawal of Gareth Moore due to injury.

In October 2014, Callum was again selected for Scotland but this time he managed to escape injury and play in the 2014 European Cup tournament. He made his International début in the tournament's opening game against Wales. He also managed to score his first International try.
