= Saint-Léon, Haute-Garonne =

Saint-Léon
- Commune
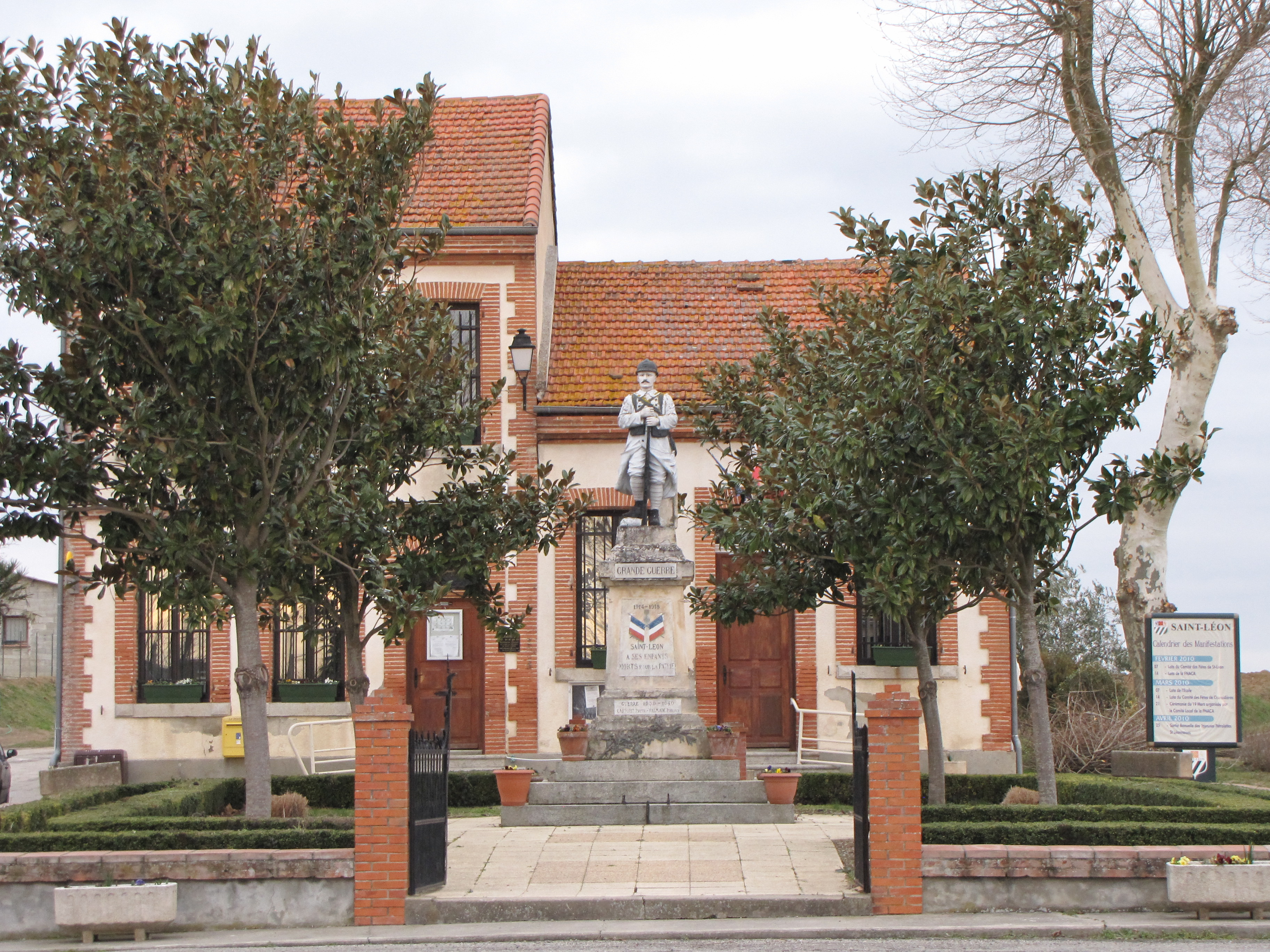
- Town hall

- Coat of arms
- Location of Saint-Léon
- Location within France Location within Occitanie
- Coordinates: 43°24′05″N 1°33′41″E
- Country: France
- Region: Occitania
- Department: Haute-Garonne
- Arrondissement: Toulouse
- Canton: Escalquens

Government
  - Mayor (2020–2026): Françoise Cases
- Area^{1}: 24.21 km^{2} (9.35 sq mi)
- Elevation: 250 m (820 ft)
- Highest elevation: 291 m (955 ft)
- Lowest elevation: 185 m (607 ft)
- Population (2023): 1,265
  - Density: 52.25/km^{2} (135.3/sq mi)
- Time zone: UTC+01:00 (CET)
  - Summer (DST): UTC+02:00 (CEST)
- INSEE/Postal code: 31495 /31560
- ^{1} French Land Register data, which excludes lakes, ponds, glaciers > 1 km^{2} (0.386 sq mi or 247 acres) and river estuaries.

Saint-Léon (French pronunciation: [sɛ̃ leɔ̃]; Languedocien: Sent Lon) is a commune in the Haute-Garonne department in southwestern France.

== Population ==
Historical population
Year	Pop.	±% p.a.
1968	474	—
1975	496	+0.65%
1982	612	+3.05%
1990	609	−0.06%
1999	750	+2.34%
2007	1,025	+3.98%
2012	1,191	+3.05%
2017	1,268	+1.26%
2023	1,265	−0.04%
Source: INSEE

== See also ==
- Communes of the Haute-Garonne department
