= Connor Farrer =

Welsh rugby league footballer

Personal information
- Full name: Connor Farrer
- Born: 6 June 1995 (age 31) Pontypridd, Wales
- Height: 5 ft 6 in (1.68 m)
- Weight: 11 st 6 lb (73 kg)

Playing information
- Position: Hooker
Club
Years	Team	Pld	T	G	FG	P
2012–	West Wales Raiders	80	33	0	0	132
Representative
Years	Team	Pld	T	G	FG	P
2014–	Wales	5	2	0	0	8
- Source: As of 9 June 2017

Connor Farrer (born 6 June 1995) is a Welsh professional rugby league footballer who plays as a hooker for the West Wales Raiders in League 1 and Wales at international level.

== Background ==
Farrer was born in Pontypridd, Wales.
