= Byron Smith (rugby league) =

Former Wales international rugby league footballer

Personal information
- Full name: Byron Smith
- Born: 5 March 1984 (age 41); Halifax, West Yorkshire, England

Playing information
- Position: Prop, Second-row
Club
Years	Team	Pld	T	G	FG	P
2003	Halifax R.L.F.C.	7	0	0	0	0
2004–05	Castleford Tigers	11	0	0	0	0
2007	Rochdale Hornets	2	0	0	0	0
2008–14	Batley Bulldogs	10	0	0	0	0
2015	Dewsbury Rams	3	0	0	0	0
	Total	33	0	0	0	0
Representative
Years	Team	Pld	T	G	FG	P
2005–14	Wales	4	0	0	0	0
- Source: As of 16 February 2021

Byron Smith (born 5 March 1984) is an English-born professional rugby league footballer for the Batley Bulldogs in National League One. He plays as a prop and can operate in the second-row. He has previously played for the Castleford Tigers in the Super League, and Halifax. He is a Wales international.

== Background ==
Byron Smith was born in Halifax, West Yorkshire, England.

== International honours ==
Byron Smith won caps for Wales while at Castleford, and Rochdale Hornets 2005...2007. He also played for Wales in their 2014 European Cup campaign. (4 apps, 0 points)
