= Brett Phillips (rugby league) =

Scotland international rugby league footballer (born 1988)

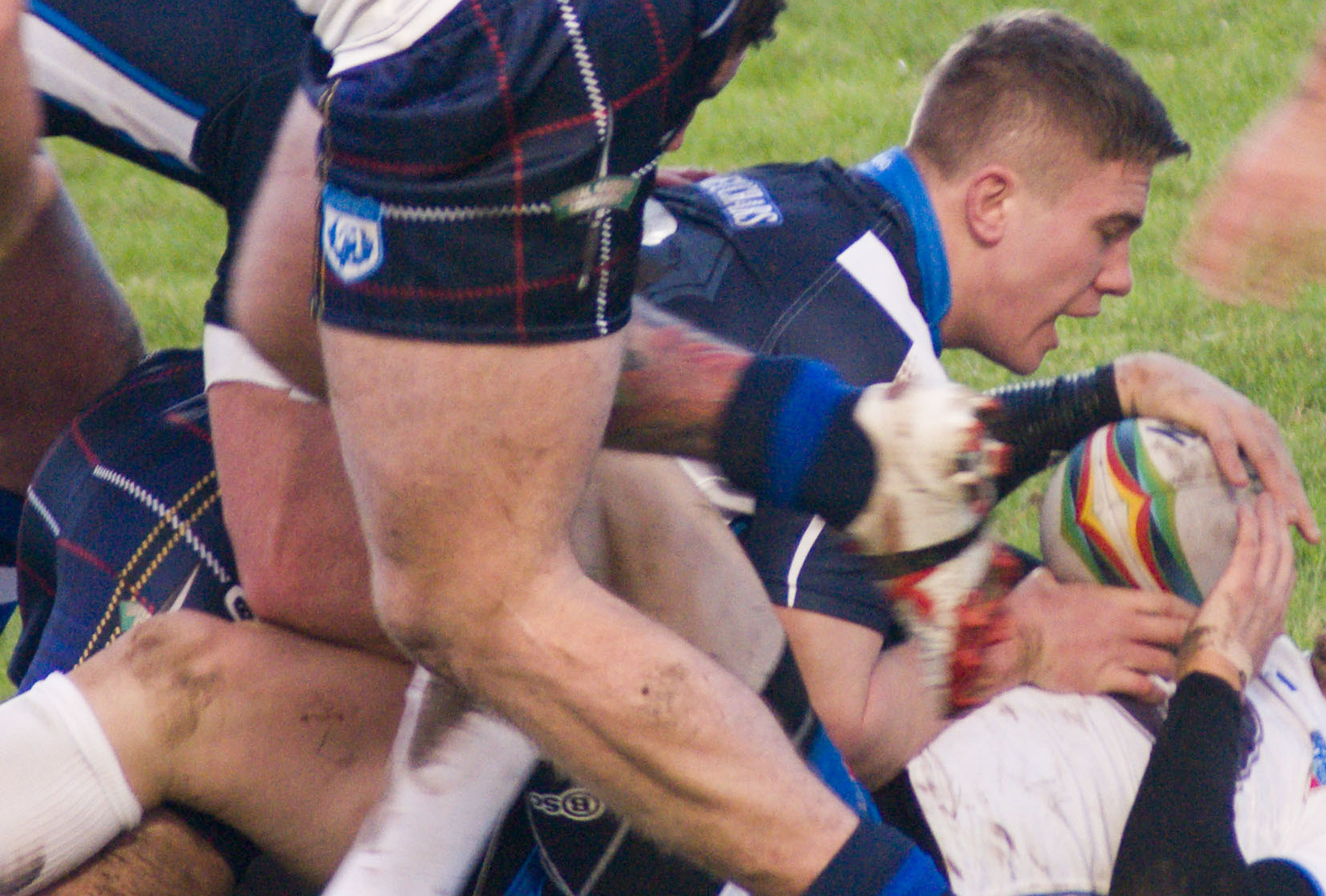

Personal information
- Full name: Brett Graeme Phillips
- Born: 25 October 1988 (age 37) Whitehaven, Cumbria, England
- Height: 6 ft 4 in (193 cm)
- Weight: 16 st 5 lb (104 kg)

Playing information
- Position: Second-row
Club
Years	Team	Pld	T	G	FG	P
2012–17	Workington Town	146	36	0	0	144
2019–21	Whitehaven	24	3	0	0	12
	Total	170	39	0	0	156
Representative
Years	Team	Pld	T	G	FG	P
2012–16	Scotland	8	3	0	0	12
- Source: As of 5 July 2022
- Relatives: Callum Phillips (brother)

Brett Phillips (born 25 October 1988) is a Scotland international rugby league footballer who plays as a second-row forward. He has played for Workington Town and Whitehaven.

== Background ==
Phillips was born in Whitehaven, Cumbria, England.

== Club career ==
=== Workington Town ===
Phillips started his career as an amateur playing for Seaton Rangers. In September 2011, he signed a professional contract with Workington Town.

=== Whitehaven RLFC ===
In 2019 he joined home-town Whitehaven RLFC

== Representative career ==
As an amateur, Phillips played for the Community Lions, the under-18 GB Lions and BARLA's under-21s and GB open age sides. He is eligible to play for Scotland through his grandfather, and was selected in their squad for the 2013 Rugby League World Cup.

In October and November 2014, Brett played in the 2014 European Cup competition. He scored a try in the tournament's opening fixture against Wales.
