= Jonathan Walker (rugby league) =

Scotland international rugby league footballer

Personal information
- Born: 20 February 1991 (age 35) Bradford, West Yorkshire, England
- Height: 190 cm (6 ft 3 in)
- Weight: 98 kg (15 st 6 lb)

Playing information
- Position: Prop
Club
Years	Team	Pld	T	G	FG	P
2009	Gateshead Thunder	7	0	0	0	0
2010–13	Castleford Tigers	50	4	0	0	16
2010(loan)	→ Doncaster	2	0	0	0	0
2013(loan)	→ Keighley Cougars	1	0	0	0	0
2014	Hull Kingston Rovers	7	0	0	0	0
2014–15	Leigh Centurions	9	1	0	0	4
2015(loan)	→ Whitehaven	5	0	0	0	0
2015(loan)	→ London Broncos	12	1	0	0	4
2016–17	Bradford Bulls	4	0	0	0	0
2016(loan)	→ Dewsbury Rams	1	0	0	0	0
	Total	98	6	0	0	24
Representative
Years	Team	Pld	T	G	FG	P
2012–17	Scotland	6	2	0	0	8
- Source: As of 18 September 2017
- Relatives: Adam Walker (brother)

Jonathan Walker (born 20 February 1991) is a Scotland international rugby league footballer who plays as a prop.

He has previously played for the Castleford Tigers, Hull Kingston Rovers, Bradford Bulls, Leigh Centurions and the Darlington Point Roosters.

== Background ==
Walker was born in England.

== Club career ==
Walker started his career with Castleford Tigers. In 2009, he was loaned out to Gateshead Thunder, where he made seven appearances. He made his début for Castleford against Wigan Warriors in round 16 of 2010's Super League XV, coming off the interchange bench for his first game.

He joined Hull Kingston Rovers from Castleford Tigers in October 2013. He spent one season at the club before joining Leigh Centurions. He spent 2015 on loan at the London Broncos.

Walker signed a two-year deal with the Bradford Bulls following the 2015 season.

== Representative career ==
Walker has been capped 4 times for Scotland in the 2014 European Cup.

He played in the 2014 European Cup tournament, scoring his first international try in the tournament's opening game against Wales. Walker also played in the 2015 European Cup tournament.

== Personal life ==
Jonathan is the twin brother of the late rugby league player Adam Walker.
