= Ryan Maneely =

Scotland international rugby league footballer

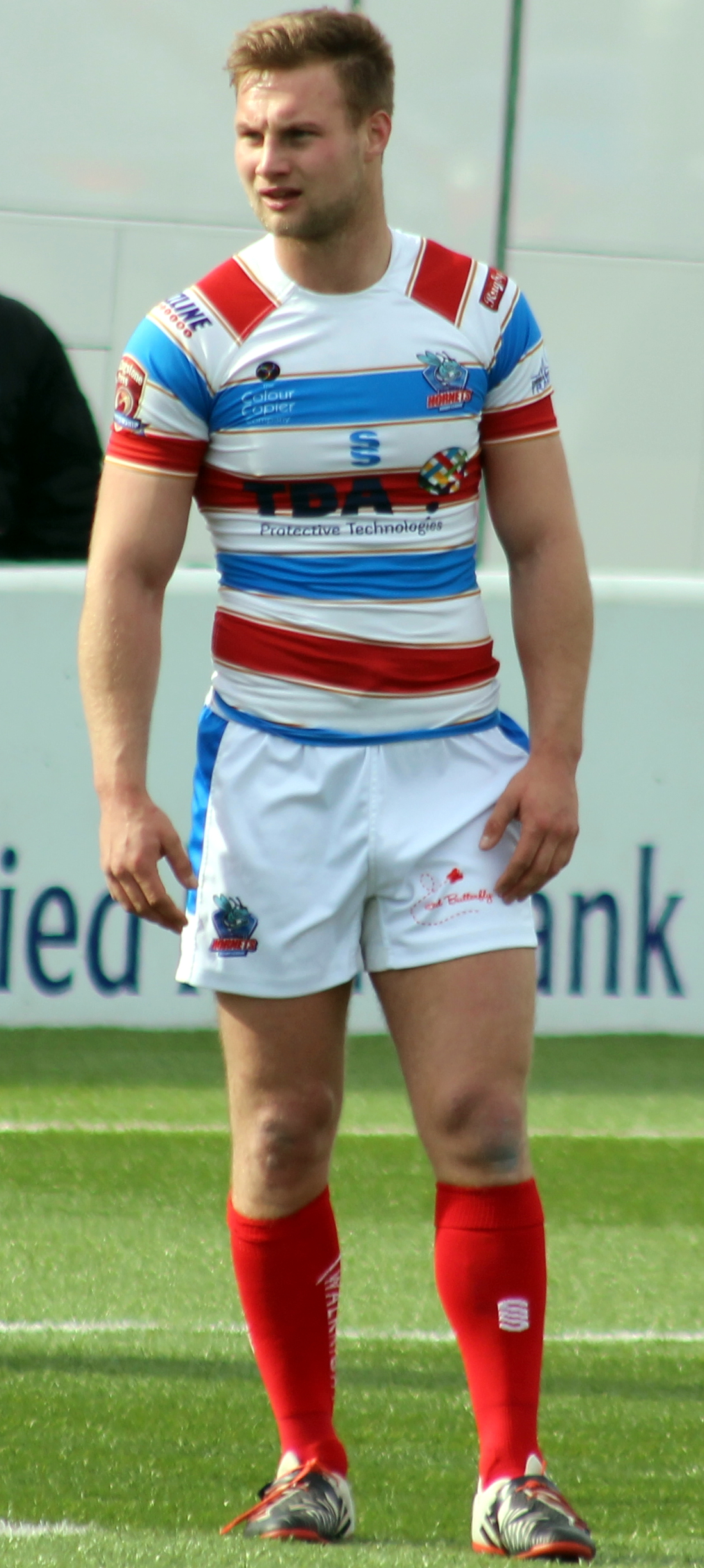

Personal information
- Full name: Ryan Maneely
- Born: 19 October 1994 (age 31) Salford, Greater Manchester, England
- Height: 5 ft 10 in (1.78 m)
- Weight: 13 st 3 lb (84 kg)

Playing information
- Position: Hooker
Club
Years	Team	Pld	T	G	FG	P
2014(loan)	→ Swinton Lions	1	0	0	0	0
2015–16	Halifax	33	5	0	0	20
2016(loan)	→ Rochdale Hornets	10	2	0	0	8
2017–18	Rochdale Hornets	18	4	0	0	16
	Total	62	11	0	0	44
Representative
Years	Team	Pld	T	G	FG	P
2016	Scotland
- Source: As of 15 April 2018

Ryan Maneely (born 19 October 1994) is an English professional rugby league footballer who played as a hooker for the Rochdale Hornets in the Championship.

Maneely has previously played for Saddleworth Rangers and been in the systems of the Warrington Wolves, and spent time on loan at the Swinton Lions and Rochdale Hornets.

In October, Maneely was named in Scotland's 2016 Four Nations squad.
