= Callum Casey =

Ireland international rugby league footballer

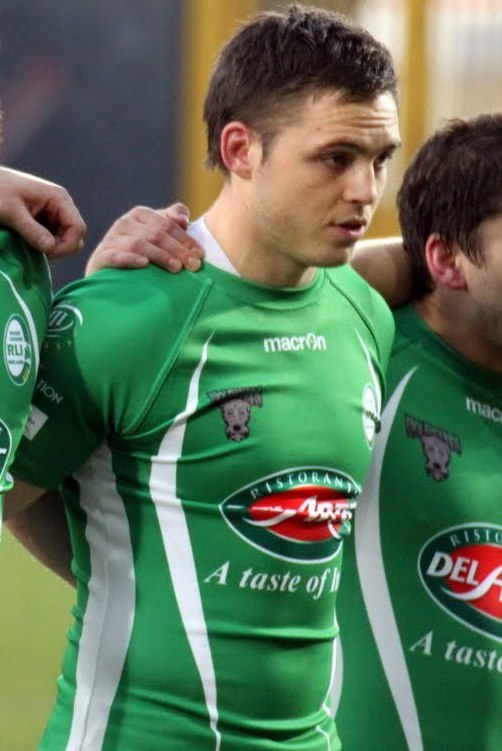

Personal information
- Full name: Callum Casey
- Born: 6 June 1990 (age 36)

Playing information
- Position: Stand-off, Hooker, Second-row, Loose forward
Club
Years	Team	Pld	T	G	FG	P
	Leeds Rhinos
2011(loan)	→ Oldham	9	3	0	0	12
2012–14	Halifax	60	14	0	0	56
2015	Hunslet Hawks	19	3	0	0	12
2016	Batley Bulldogs	1	0	0	0	0
2016(loan)	→ Oxford	1	0	0	0	0
2016–	Hunslet Hawks	5	0	0	0	0
	Total	95	20	0	0	80
Representative
Years	Team	Pld	T	G	FG	P
2011–14	Ireland	4	1	0	0	4
- Source: As of 7 July 2021
- Father: Leo Casey

Callum Casey (born 6 June 1990) is a professional rugby league footballer who has played in the 2010s. He has played at representative level for Ireland, and at club level for the Leeds Rhinos (Academy and Reserves), on loan from the Leeds Rhinos for Oldham (loan), Halifax, in the Kingstone Press Championship One for Hunslet Hawks (Heritage No.) (two spells), Batley Bulldogs and on loan from the Batley Bulldogs at Oxford (loan), as a stand-off, hooker, second-row or loose forward.

== Background ==
Callum Casey is the son of the rugby league footballer; Leo Casey.
