= Sam Barlow (rugby league) =

Scotland international rugby league footballer

Personal information
- Full name: Sam Robert Barlow
- Born: 7 March 1988 (age 37); Halifax, West Yorkshire, England
- Height: 6 ft 4 in (1.93 m)
- Weight: 17 st 0 lb (108 kg)

Playing information
- Position: Loose forward, Second-row, Prop
Club
Years	Team	Pld	T	G	FG	P
2008	Widnes Vikings	6	2	0	0	8
2009–10	Sheffield Eagles	40	14	0	0	56
2010–13	Halifax	69	37	0	0	148
2013(loan)	→ Featherstone Rovers	9	1	0	0	4
2014–15	Leigh Centurions	51	9	0	0	36
2020	Bradford Bulls	0	0	0	0	0
	Total	175	63	0	0	252
Representative
Years	Team	Pld	T	G	FG	P
2010–13	Scotland	9	1	0	0	4
- Source: As of 22 March 2021
- Relatives: Josh Barlow (brother)

Sam Barlow (born 7 March 1988) is a Scotland international rugby league footballer who plays for the Bradford Bulls in the Championship.

== Background ==
Barlow was born in Halifax, West Yorkshire, England.

== Playing career ==
Barlow represented England at academy level, and in 2007 he signed a two-year contract with Huddersfield Giants following a trial at the club. He left the club to go to Sheffield on loan after 8 appearances. In August 2009 Barlow left to join Halifax.

In September 2010, Sheffield Eagles threatened legal action against Barlow and Halifax due to a breach of contract. Barlow had been released by Sheffield Eagles on the condition that he did not play against the club during the rest of the season, but this agreement was broken when Barlow played (and scored a try) in Halifax's 42–16 victory over Sheffield Eagles in the Championship play-off semi finals. The clubs later agreed an out-of-court settlement.

Barlow is a Scotland international, having made his début in 2010. He was named in their squad for the 2013 Rugby League World Cup.

He is the brother of the rugby league footballer; Josh Barlow.

On 7 September 2016, Barlow was banned from all sport for four years for assaulting a UK Anti-Doping Agency official in June 2015. The start of the ban as backdated to November 2015 meaning Barlow cannot participate in any sport until November 2019.

In December 2019, Barlow signed a one-year deal with Bradford Bulls following the end of his ban, but suffered a broken arm in a pre-season game against Dewsbury Rams.
