= David Scott (rugby league) =

Scotland international rugby league footballer and coach

Dave Scott
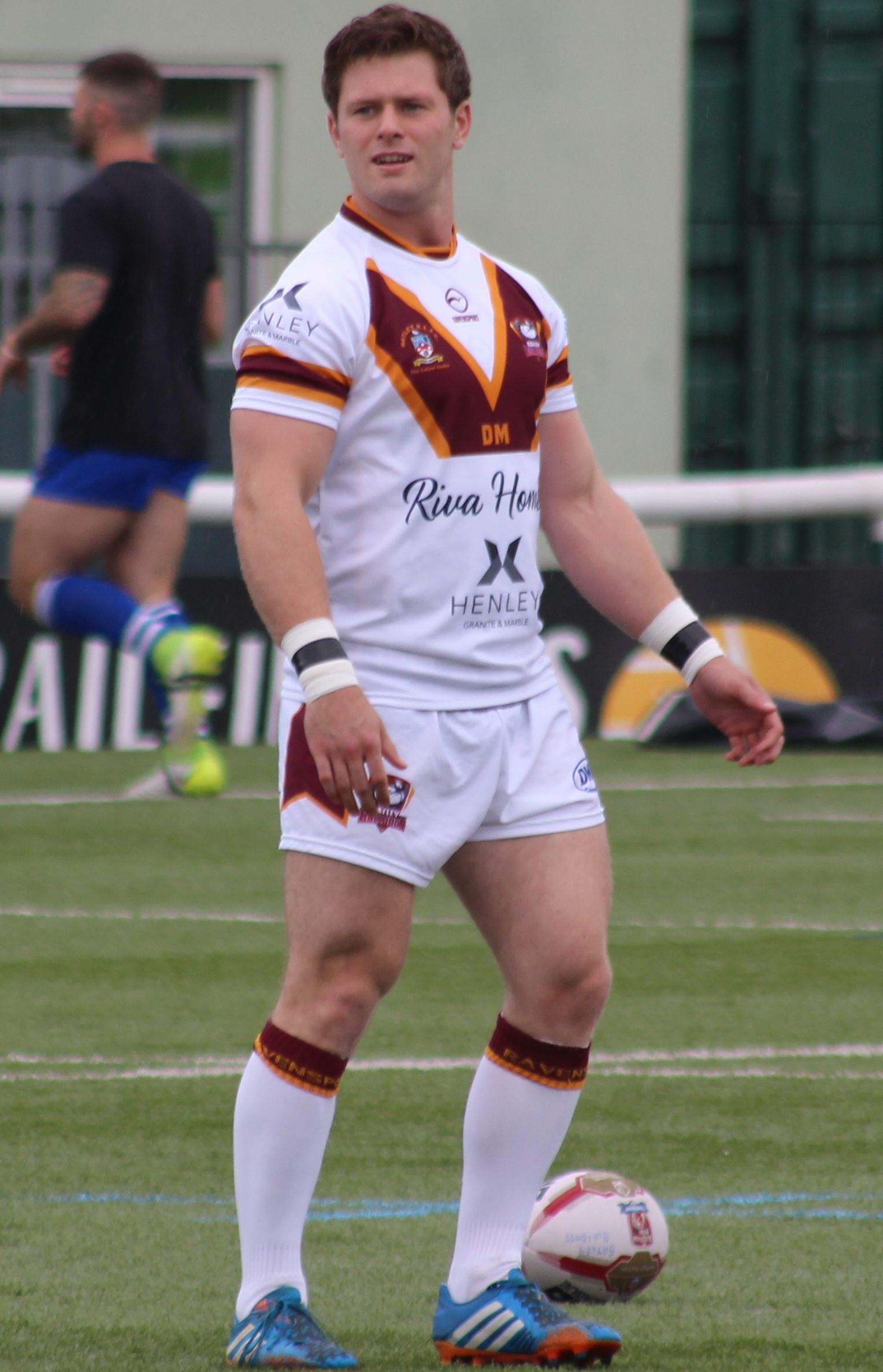

Personal information
- Full name: David Scott
- Born: 8 June 1993 (age 32) Stirling, Scotland
- Height: 5 ft 8 in (1.73 m)
- Weight: 12 st 8 lb (80 kg)

Playing information
- Position: Wing, Fullback
Club
Years	Team	Pld	T	G	FG	P
2013	Featherstone Rovers	1	1	0	0	4
2013–15	Doncaster	66	24	97	0	290
2016–20	Batley Bulldogs	125	38	72	0	296
2021–22	Midlands Hurricanes	24	10	1	0	42
	Total	216	73	170	0	632
Representative
Years	Team	Pld	T	G	FG	P
2011–19	Scotland	17	9	10	0	56
- Source: As of 5 July 2022

David Scott (born 8 June 1993) is a Scottish professional rugby league footballer who last played as a fullback or winger for the Midlands Hurricanes in League 1, and Scotland at international level.

He has previously spent time with Featherstone Rovers and played for Doncaster in the Championship.

== Background ==
Scott was born in Stirling, Scotland.

== Club career ==
Scott started playing rugby at the age of seven for his local rugby union club. Scott was first introduced to rugby league when he watched it on television, and began playing the sport from the age of 12 for Easterhouse Panthers. He was scouted by English Super League side Hull Kingston Rovers, who signed him in 2011.

=== Featherstone Rovers ===
He spent two years playing for Hull KR's academy before joining Featherstone Rovers ahead of the 2013 season.

=== Doncaster ===
He was loaned out to Doncaster, and joined the club on a permanent deal for the 2014 season.

=== Coventry Bears ===
On 4 September 2020 it was announced that Scott would join Coventry Bears as a player/coach

== International career ==
At the age of 18, Scott made his senior début for Scotland in 2011, scoring two tries and two goals in a 26–6 victory over Ireland.

In 2013, Scott was selected in Scotland's 2013 Rugby League World Cup squad. He was one of two Scottish-born players to be included in the squad (the other being Matty Russell), and is the only player to have also been raised in Scotland. He played in two of Scotland's four games, starting on the wing in the final group game against the United States, and keeping his place in the team in the quarter-final defeat by New Zealand.

In October and November 2014, David played in the 2014 European Cup. He scored two tries in the tournament's opening game against Wales.

In October and November 2015, David played for Scotland in the 2015 European Cup.
