= Adam Walker (rugby league) =

English rugby league footballer (1991–2022)

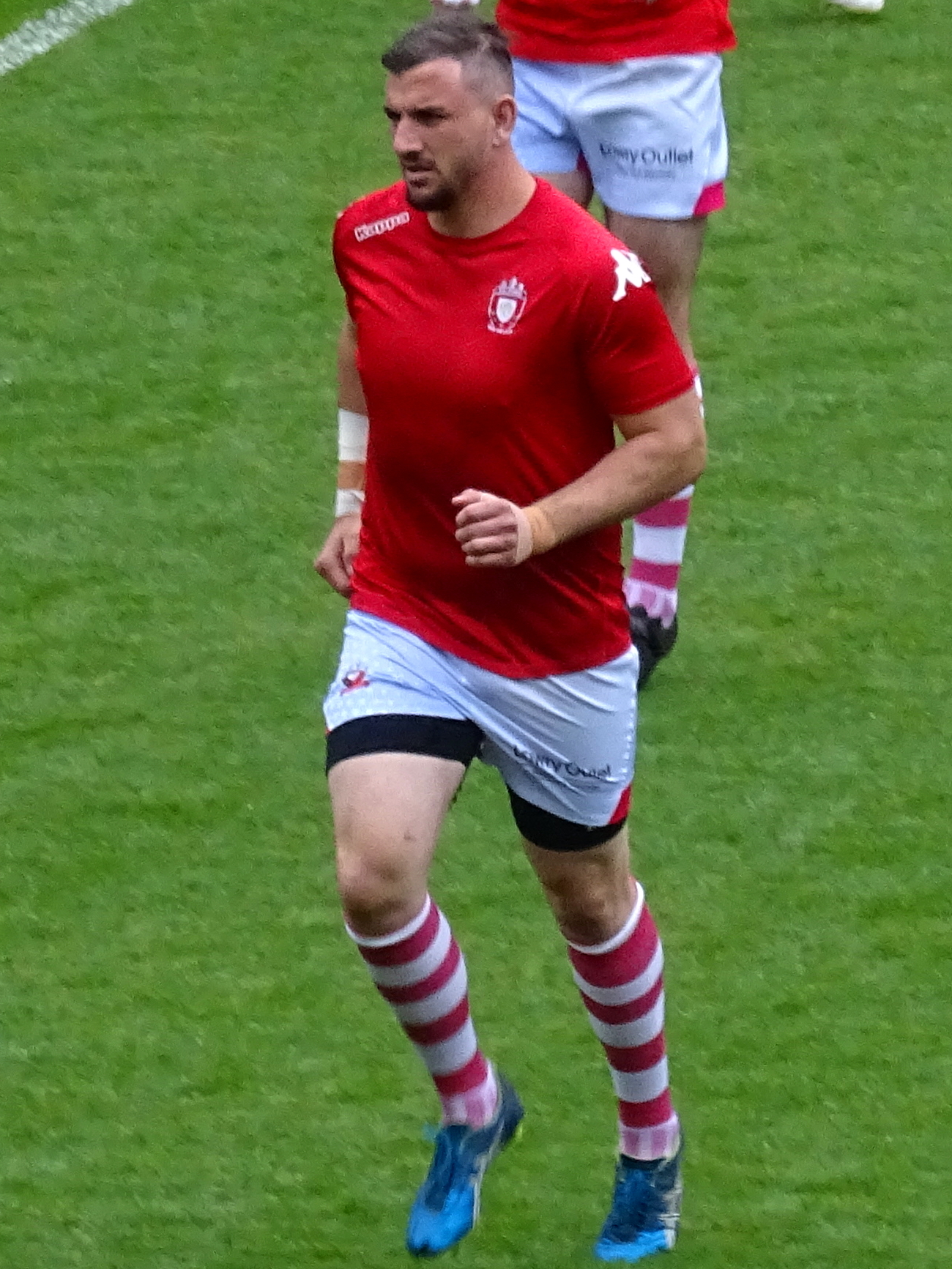
- Walker in 2019

Personal information
- Born: 20 February 1991 Bradford, West Yorkshire, England
- Died: 4 October 2022 (aged 31)

Playing information
- Height: 6 ft 3 in (1.91 m)
- Weight: 17 st 2 lb (109 kg)
- Position: Prop
Club
Years	Team	Pld	T	G	FG	P
2010–12	Huddersfield Giants	6	0	0	0	0
2011(loan)	→ Barrow Raiders	16	0	0	0	0
2012(loan)	→ Swinton Lions	7	2	0	0	8
2013–16	Hull Kingston Rovers	108	9	0	0	36
2017	St Helens	9	1	0	0	4
2017	Wakefield Trinity	7	0	0	0	0
2019	Salford Red Devils	25	4	0	0	16
	Total	178	16	0	0	64
Representative
Years	Team	Pld	T	G	FG	P
2012–19	Scotland	14	1	0	0	4
- Source: As of 4 October 2022
- Relatives: Jonathan Walker (brother)

Adam Walker (20 February 1991 – 4 October 2022) was a Scotland international rugby league prop. At club level he played for the Huddersfield Giants, Hull Kingston Rovers, St Helens, Wakefield Trinity and the Salford Red Devils in the Super League, and on loan from Huddersfield at the Barrow Raiders and the Swinton Lions in the Championship.

== Background ==
Walker was born in Bradford, West Yorkshire, England. He was the twin brother of fellow rugby league player Jonathan Walker.

== Playing career ==
=== Huddersfield Giants ===
Walker started his career at Huddersfield in 2010 where he played sporadically only making 6 appearances for the Giants. He spent most of 2011 on loan at Barrow where he made 16 appearances. In 2012 Walker was sent out on loan again, this time to Swinton where he played 7 times scoring twice.

=== Hull Kingston Rovers ===
Walker was sold to Hull KR in 2013 after claiming that he wanted a new challenge, and also that Hull KR is a big club. He scored his first try for Hull KR against London Broncos.

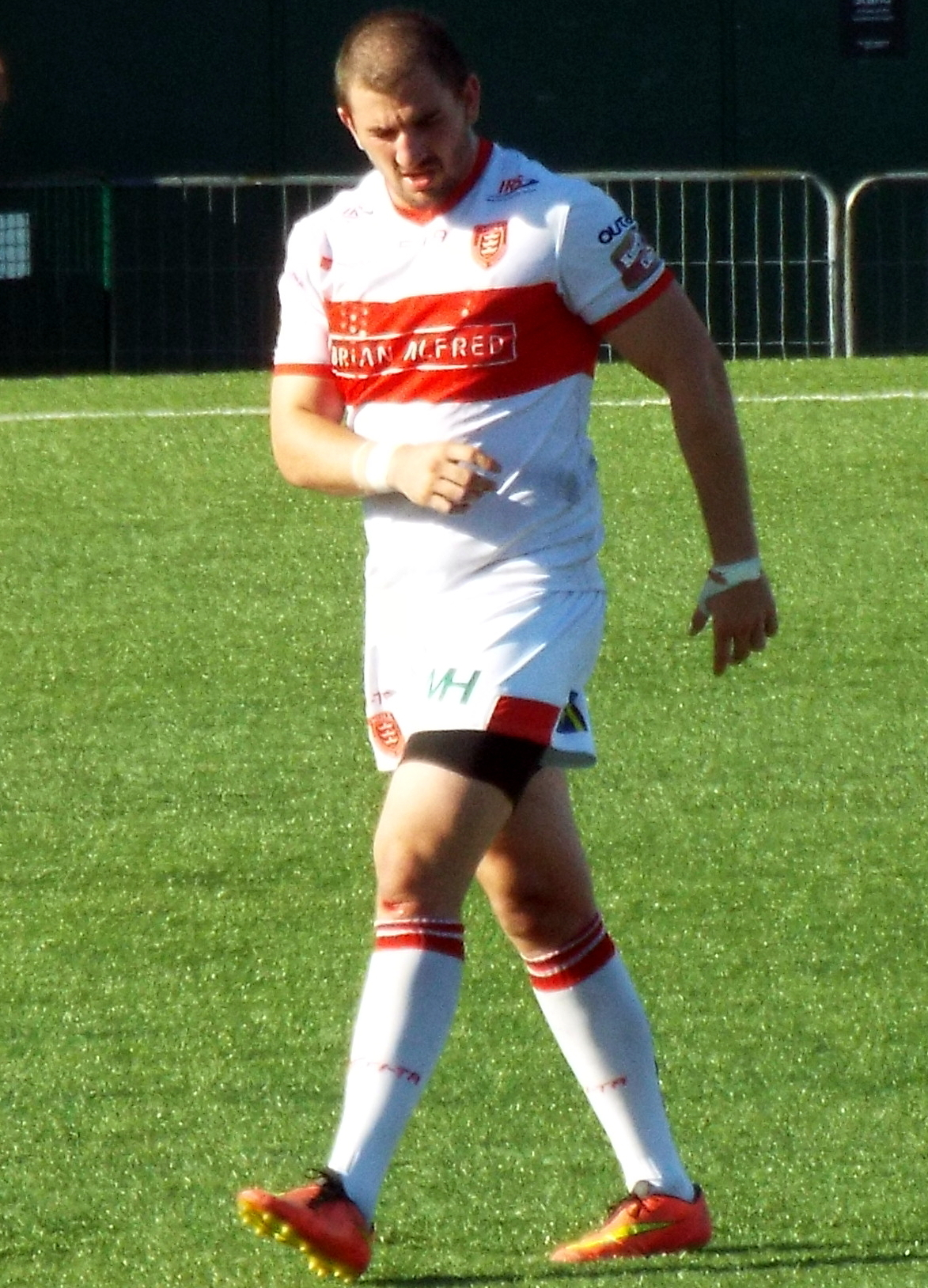
Walker playing for Hull KR in 2016

Walker played 107 times for Hull KR until he rejected a reduced contract when the club was relegated after losing the Million Pound Game to Salford.

=== St Helens ===
After departing Hull KR, Walker signed for St Helens for the 2017 season. His time at St Helens was unsuccessful and he failed to see out the end of the season at the club as he was sold to Wakefield Trinity after making only 9 appearances for the club scoring one try.

=== Wakefield Trinity ===
After an unsuccessful start to the season at St Helens, Walker signed for Wakefield on a 2½-year deal but only played 7 times before being dismissed when he tested positive for cocaine.

=== Salford Red Devils ===
Walker signed a 2-season contract with Salford commencing at the completion of his drugs ban in March 2019.

He played in the 2019 Super League Grand Final defeat by St. Helens at Old Trafford.

On 21 February 2020 it was announced that, by mutual agreement, Walker had left Salford with immediate effect

=== Leigh Centurions ===
On 11 August 2020 it was announced that Walker had signed for the Leigh Centurions. Only three months later, on 17 November 2020 it was announced that Walker had terminated his contract with Leigh with immediate effect.

== International career ==
In October 2013, Walker was selected to play for Scotland in the 2013 Rugby League World Cup. He made his international début against Tonga in the group stage. Further appearances followed in October and November 2014, as Walker played in the 2014 European Cup competition. He played in all of Scotland's games and scored a try in their fixture against France.

In October and November 2015, Walker played in the 2015 European Cup competition.

== Personal life and death ==
On 27 January 2016, Walker was charged with two offences of attempting to engage in sexual activity with a child, with a court appearance due later in February of that year. He remained available for selection. All charges were ultimately dismissed.

In August 2017, Walker was suspended for 20 months after testing positive for cocaine usage during a drugs test.

Walker died on 4 October 2022, at the age of 31. His death was reported as suicide and he had been suffering from depression and anxiety.
