= Steve McCormack =

English rugby league coach

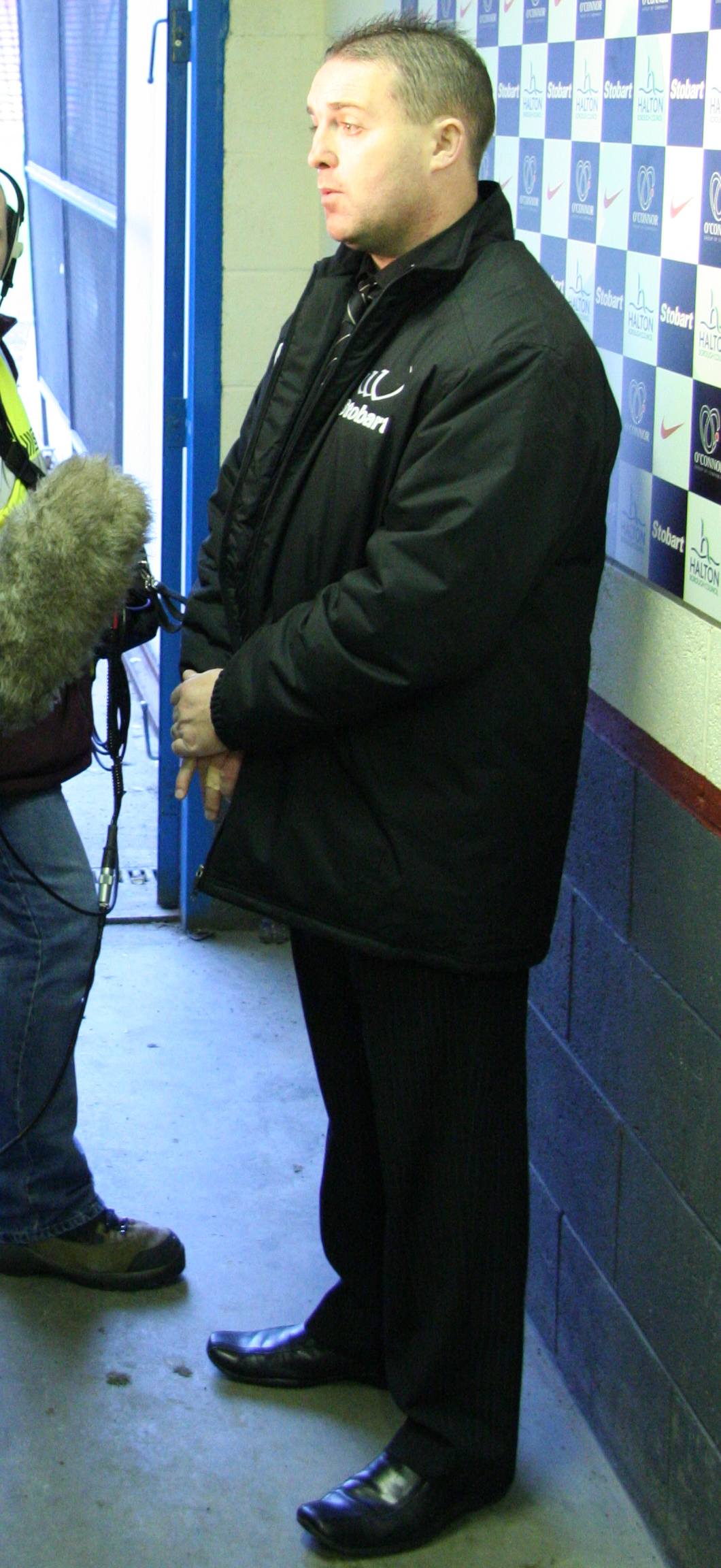

Personal information
- Full name: Steven McCormack
- Born: 1973 (age 52–53) Wigan, Lancashire, England

Coaching information
Club
Years	Team	Gms	W	D	L	W%
2001–02	Salford City Reds	28	8	0	20	29
2004–05	Whitehaven Warriors	63	49	20	14	78
2005–09	Widnes Vikings	98	66	2	30	67
2009	Gateshead Thunder	16	8	1	7	50
2009–10	Barrow Raiders	30	18	1	11	60
2010–13	Swinton Lions	50	23	2	25	46
2014	Gloucestershire All Golds	14	6	0	8	43
	Total	299	178	26	115	60
Representative
Years	Team	Gms	W	D	L	W%
2004–17	Scotland	36	14	3	19	39
- Source: As of 12 October 2023

Steve McCormack, formerly a rugby league coach, is now the Director of Welfare and Well-Being for the charity Rugby League Cares. He was head coach of Scotland until 2017 and was the longest reigning coach in the nation's history having held the role since 2004. He has also had an extensive club coaching career, having coached Salford City Reds in the Super League and Whitehaven Warriors, Widnes Vikings, Barrow Raiders Swinton Lions and Gloucestershire All Golds in the Rugby League Championships.

== Coaching career ==
Steve McCormack is the son of the former rugby league footballer for Oldham, James "Jim" McCormack. His first coaching appointment was in 2001, at Salford City Reds, which made him at the age of 28 the youngest coach in the Super League. He was sacked 10 months later, after a run of poor results. He later won National League One Coach of the Year having twice taken Whitehaven Warriors to the Grand Final but losing to Leigh Centurions (2004) and Castleford Tigers (2005) to miss out on promotion to Super League.

He was appointed coach of Widnes Vikings after the club's relegation from Super League in 2005 and the subsequent departure of Frank Endacott. In his first season with Widnes he led the club to the National League One grand final where they subsequently lost to Hull Kingston Rovers. During the 2007 season McCormack won the Northern Rail Cup beating his old side Whitehaven Warriors 56–6 in the final at Blackpool. McCormack was soon after rewarded with a new 2-year contract keeping him with Widnes until the end of the 2009 season. Widnes failed to gain promotion to Super League losing out to Castleford Tigers in the 2007 National League One Grand Final. In October 2007 Steve McCormack left Widnes and joined Hull Kingston Rovers as assistant coach to Justin Morgan. However, nine days later after leaving Widnes Vikings, Steve returned as head coach with a new set up after Steve O'Connor took over the club. In February 2009 Steve parted company with Widnes and this is thought to have happened after a poor performance against Oldham. He was taken over by assistant John Stankevitch in a caretaker role. On 22 October 2009 he was named as the new head coach of Barrow Raiders.

McCormack resigned from Barrow at the end of the 2010 season and moved to Swinton Lions for the 2011 season, before leaving prior to the 2013 Championship season.

== Background ==
Steve McCormack was born in Wigan, Lancashire.

== International coaching career ==
McCormack has held the position as coach of Scotland since 2004. He was in charge for the 2008 Rugby League World Cup campaign, in which Scotland registered their first victory at a World Cup. He was also in charge of Scotland's 2013 Rugby League World Cup campaign, in which Scotland earned their best result in a World Cup, finishing in the quarter-final stages. Scotland won the 2014 European Cup and thus qualified for the 2016 Rugby League Four Nations

== Honours ==
- 2004 – Championship coach of the year with Whitehaven Warriors
- 2005 – Championship coach of the year with Whitehaven Warriors
- 2007 – Northern Rail Cup winner with Widnes Vikings
- 2011 – Championship 1 title winner with Swinton Lions
- 2011 – Championship 1 coach of the year with Swinton Lions
- 2014 – European Cup winner with Scotland
