= 2017 Rugby League World Cup squads =

The 2017 Rugby League World Cup featured fourteen international teams, with each consisting of a twenty-four-man squad.

== Pool A ==
=== Australia ===
Head coach: (Australia) Mal Meninga

Australia's 24-man squad is composed entirely of players who play in the NRL. In the days following the initial squad announcement, Andrew Fifita withdrew from the squad in order to represent Tonga while Darius Boyd withdrew due to an ongoing hamstring injury. Campbell-Gillard and Mansour were named as the respective replacements. Seven members of the squad are uncapped for the Kangaroos (Campbell-Gillard, Gagai, Graham, Kaufusi, McLean, Munster, and T. Trbojevic).

Player	Games	Points	Club
Reagan Campbell-Gillard	4	0	(Australia) Penrith Panthers
Will Chambers	4	0	(Australia) Melbourne Storm
Boyd Cordner (vc)	4	4	(Australia) Sydney Roosters
Cooper Cronk	4	0	(Australia) Melbourne Storm
Josh Dugan	4	8	(Australia) St. George Illawarra Dragons
Tyson Frizell	4	4	(Australia) St. George Illawarra Dragons
Dane Gagai	4	12	(Australia) Newcastle Knights
Matt Gillett	4	4	(Australia) Brisbane Broncos
Wade Graham	5	16	(Australia) Cronulla-Sutherland Sharks
Valentine Holmes	5	48	(Australia) Cronulla-Sutherland Sharks
Ben Hunt	1	0	(Australia) Brisbane Broncos
Felise Kaufusi	2	0	(Australia) Melbourne Storm
David Klemmer	5	0	(Australia) Canterbury-Bankstown Bulldogs
James Maloney	1	12	(Australia) Cronulla-Sutherland Sharks
Josh Mansour	2	0	(Australia) Penrith Panthers
Josh McGuire	4	0	(Australia) Brisbane Broncos
Jordan McLean	5	0	(Australia) Melbourne Storm
Michael Morgan	4	8	(Australia) North Queensland Cowboys
Cameron Munster	2	16	(Australia) Melbourne Storm
Billy Slater	4	20	(Australia) Melbourne Storm
Cameron Smith (c)	5	48	(Australia) Melbourne Storm
Jake Trbojevic	1	0	(Australia) Manly Warringah Sea Eagles
Tom Trbojevic	2	4	(Australia) Manly Warringah Sea Eagles
Aaron Woods	5	0	(Australia) Wests Tigers

=== England ===
Head coach: (Australia) Wayne Bennett

Uncapped players Currie and Walmsley have been included in a squad that is very similar to the one that was named to played Samoa earlier in the year. Zak Hardaker was not considered for selection after he tested positive for cocaine four weeks prior to the squad announcement, the details of which were publicly reported only hours before said announcement. All 24 players were selected from the top-tier Super League or NRL competitions.

Player	Games	Points	Club
John Bateman	5	8	(England) Wigan Warriors
Kevin Brown	3	0	(England) Warrington Wolves
Sam Burgess	3	0	(Australia) South Sydney Rabbitohs
Tom Burgess	5	4	(Australia) South Sydney Rabbitohs
Ben Currie	5	8	(England) Warrington Wolves
Luke Gale	5	0	(England) Castleford Tigers
James Graham	5	4	(Australia) Canterbury-Bankstown Bulldogs
Ryan Hall	4	8	(England) Leeds Rhinos
Chris Heighington	2	0	(Australia) Cronulla-Sutherland Sharks
Chris Hill	5	0	(England) Warrington Wolves
Josh Hodgson	4	0	(Australia) Canberra Raiders
Jonny Lomax	1	0	(England) St. Helens
Jermaine McGillvary	5	28	(England) Huddersfield Giants
Mike McMeeken	1	0	(England) Castleford Tigers
Sean O'Loughlin (c)	5	0	(England) Wigan Warriors
Mark Percival	1	4	(England) St. Helens
Stefan Ratchford	2	4	(England) Warrington Wolves
James Roby	4	0	(England) St. Helens
Scott Taylor	1	0	(England) Hull F.C.
Alex Walmsley	4	4	(England) St. Helens
Kallum Watkins	4	12	(England) Leeds Rhinos
Elliott Whitehead	4	0	(Australia) Canberra Raiders
Gareth Widdop	5	41	(Australia) St. George Illawarra Dragons
George Williams	2	0	(England) Wigan Warriors

=== France ===
Head coach: (France) Aurélien Cologni

In addition to the twenty-four man squad, four players were named as alternatives: Kevin Larroyer, Lambert Belmas, Rémy Marginet and Ilias Bergal.
Gadwin Springer was initially named in the squad but withdrew due to a groin injury. He was replaced by Belmas. Guillaume Bonnet was initially named in the squad but withdrew due to a ligament injury. He was replaced by Marginet. Hakim Miloudi was initially named in the squad but was dropped due to disciplinary reasons. He was replaced by Bergal.

Player	Games	Points	Club
Bastien Ader	3	8	(France) Toulouse Olympique
Lucas Albert	2	2	(France) Catalans Dragons
Olivier Arnaud	1	0	(France) SO Avignon
Jason Baitieri	3	0	(France) Catalans Dragons
William Barthau	1	6	(England) London Broncos
Lambert Belmas	0	0	(France) Catalans Dragons
Ilias Bergal	3	0	(England) Swinton Lions
John Boudebza	2	0	(England) London Broncos
Julian Bousquet	3	0	(France) Catalans Dragons
Clément Boyer	1	0	(France) Toulouse Olympique
Damien Cardace	1	4	(France) FC Lézignan
Nabil Djalout	2	0	(France) Catalans Dragons
Théo Fages (c)	3	0	(England) St. Helens
Benjamin Garcia	3	4	(France) Catalans Dragons
Maxime Hérold	2	0	(France) Limoux Grizzlies
Benjamin Jullien	3	0	(England) Warrington Wolves
Mark Kheirallah	3	4	(France) Toulouse Olympique
Thibaut Margalet	3	0	(France) Catalans Dragons
Rémy Marginet	1	2	(England) Sheffield Eagles
Antoni Maria	2	0	(England) Leigh Centurions
Romain Navarrete	2	0	(England) Wigan Warriors
Éloi Pélissier	2	0	(England) Leigh Centurions
Mickael Rouch	2	0	(France) Limoux Grizzlies
Fouad Yaha	3	0	(France) Catalans Dragons

=== Lebanon ===
Head coach: (Australia) Brad Fittler

Reece Robinson was initially named in the squad but withdrew due to injury. He was replaced by Daniel Abou-Sleiman.

Player	Games	Points	Club
Daniel Abou-Sleiman	1	0	Unattached
Danny Barakat	1	0	(Australia) Wentworthville Magpies
Jamie Clark	3	0	(Australia) Auburn Warriors
Adam Doueihi	4	8	(Australia) South Sydney Rabbitohs
James Elias	3	4	(Australia) Wests Newcastle
Ahmad Ellaz	4	0	(Australia) Auburn Warriors
Robbie Farah (c)	4	0	(Australia) South Sydney Rabbitohs
Nick Kassis	3	4	(Australia) Blacktown Workers Sea Eagles
Andrew Kazzi	2	0	(Australia) Wests Tigers
Anthony Layoun	3	4	(Australia) Parramatta Eels
Michael Lichaa	4	0	(Australia) Canterbury-Bankstown Bulldogs
Bilal Maarbani	1	0	(Australia) Manly Warringah Sea Eagles
Mitchell Mamary	4	0	(Australia) Auburn Warriors
Tim Mannah	4	0	(Australia) Parramatta Eels
Abbas Miski	4	8	(Australia) North Sydney Bears
Mitchell Moses (vc)	4	21	(Australia) Parramatta Eels
Ray Moujalli	3	0	(Australia) Canterbury-Bankstown Bulldogs
Travis Robinson	3	8	(Australia) Newtown Jets
Chris Saab	1	0	(Australia) Guildford Owls
Raymond Sabat	0	0	(Lebanon) Lycans FC
Jaleel Seve-Derbas	1	0	(Australia) Wests Tigers
Elias Sukkar	3	0	(Australia) Auburn Warriors
Alex Twal	4	0	(Australia) Wests Tigers
Jason Wehbe	4	4	Unattached

== Pool B ==
=== New Zealand ===
Head coach: (New Zealand) David Kidwell

Kevin Proctor and captain Jesse Bromwich were not considered for selection after being caught buying and using cocaine following the 2017 Anzac Test in May; Blair was subsequently named captain for the tournament. Five uncapped players (Asofa-Solomona, Fonua-Blake, Levi, Liu, and Takairangi) are included in the squad as Tohu Harris, Jordan Kahu, Kieran Foran, and Ben Matulino were ruled out by injury, while Jason Taumalolo opted to represent his Tongan heritage over the Kiwis.

Player	Games	Points	Club
Nelson Asofa-Solomona	4	4	(Australia) Melbourne Storm
Gerard Beale	1	0	(Australia) Cronulla-Sutherland Sharks
Adam Blair (c)	4	0	(Australia) Brisbane Broncos
Kenny Bromwich	1	4	(Australia) Melbourne Storm
Addin Fonua-Blake	1	0	(Australia) Manly Warringah Sea Eagles
Peta Hiku	1	12	(England) Warrington Wolves
Shaun Johnson	4	44	New Zealand Warriors
Thomas Leuluai	2	0	(England) Wigan Warriors
Danny Levi	4	0	(Australia) Newcastle Knights
Isaac Liu	3	4	(Australia) Sydney Roosters
Simon Mannering	3	0	New Zealand Warriors
Te Maire Martin	2	12	(Australia) North Queensland Cowboys
Jason Nightingale	1	8	(Australia) St. George Illawarra Dragons
Kodi Nikorima	3	4	(Australia) Brisbane Broncos
Russell Packer	4	4	(Australia) St. George Illawarra Dragons
Jordan Rapana	3	8	(Australia) Canberra Raiders
Brad Takairangi	4	4	(Australia) Parramatta Eels
Joseph Tapine	4	4	(Australia) Canberra Raiders
Martin Taupau	4	0	(Australia) Manly Warringah Sea Eagles
Elijah Taylor	1	4	(Australia) Wests Tigers
Roger Tuivasa-Sheck	4	12	New Zealand Warriors
Jared Waerea-Hargreaves	4	0	(Australia) Sydney Roosters
Dallin Watene-Zelezniak	3	4	(Australia) Penrith Panthers
Dean Whare	3	4	(Australia) Penrith Panthers

=== Samoa ===
Head coach: (Australia) Matt Parish

Sione Mata'utia and Tautau Moga were initially named in the squad but withdrew due to injury. They were replaced by Lafai and Winterstein. Luai, Musgrove, Papalii, and Tevaga are the only uncapped players for Samoa, with Luai making an unexpected appearance in the squad as the only player without NRL experience.

Player	Games	Points	Club
Bunty Afoa	4	0	New Zealand Warriors
Leeson Ah Mau	4	0	(Australia) St. George Illawarra Dragons
Fa'amanu Brown	3	0	(Australia) Cronulla-Sutherland Sharks
Herman Ese'ese	4	0	(Australia) Brisbane Broncos
Pita Godinet	2	0	(Australia) Manly Warringah Sea Eagles
Tim Lafai	4	10	(Australia) St. George Illawarra Dragons
Joseph Leilua	4	0	(Australia) Canberra Raiders
Ricky Leutele	3	0	(Australia) Cronulla-Sutherland Sharks
Sam Lisone	2	0	New Zealand Warriors
Jarome Luai	3	0	(Australia) Penrith Panthers
Suaia Matagi	2	0	(Australia) Parramatta Eels
Peter Mata'utia	1	0	(Australia) Newcastle Knights
Ken Maumalo	2	4	New Zealand Warriors
Zane Musgrove	1	0	(Australia) South Sydney Rabbitohs
Josh Papalii	4	0	(Australia) Canberra Raiders
Joseph Paulo	3	4	(Australia) Cronulla-Sutherland Sharks
Junior Paulo	4	4	(Australia) Canberra Raiders
Frank Pritchard (c)	3	0	(Australia) Parramatta Eels
Ben Roberts	3	4	(England) Castleford Tigers
Sam Tagataese (vc)	1	0	(Australia) Cronulla-Sutherland Sharks
Jazz Tevaga	4	4	New Zealand Warriors
Young Tonumaipea	4	4	(Australia) Melbourne Storm
Frank Winterstein	1	0	(Australia) Manly Warringah Sea Eagles
Matthew Wright	2	6	(Australia) Manly Warringah Sea Eagles

=== Scotland ===
Head coach: (England) Steve McCormack

Ryan Brierley was originally selected, but withdrew after failing a fitness test. He was replaced by Oakes. Brooks, Brough, and Walker were dropped on 5 November for disciplinary reasons.

Player	Games	Points	Club
Danny Addy	3	12	(England) Hull Kingston Rovers
Jarred Anderson	2	0	(Australia) Sydney Roosters
James Bell	3	0	New Zealand Warriors
Andrew Bentley	2	0	(France) Toulouse Olympique
Kane Bentley	3	0	(France) Toulouse Olympique
Sam Brooks	2	0	(England) Featherstone Rovers
Danny Brough (c)	2	0	(England) Huddersfield Giants
Luke Douglas (vc)	3	0	(England) St. Helens
Dale Ferguson	3	0	(England) Huddersfield Giants
Ben Hellewell	3	0	(England) London Broncos
Ben Kavanagh	3	0	(England) Hull Kingston Rovers
Frankie Mariano	2	4	(England) Featherstone Rovers
Kieran Moran	0	0	(England) Hull Kingston Rovers
Will Oakes	1	0	(England) Hull Kingston Rovers
Callum Phillips	2	0	(England) Workington Town
Matty Russell	3	0	(England) Warrington Wolves
David Scott	0	0	(England) Batley Bulldogs
Lachlan Stein	3	0	(Australia) Penrith Panthers
Oscar Thomas	2	4	(England) Bradford Bulls
Lewis Tierney	3	4	(England) Wigan Warriors
Shane Toal	1	0	(England) Barrow Raiders
Alex Walker	1	0	(England) London Broncos
Jonathan Walker	2	0	(Australia) Darlington Point Roosters
Brandan Wilkinson	2	0	(England) Bradford Bulls

=== Tonga ===
Head coach: (Australia) Kristian Woolf

Player	Games	Points	Club
Andrew Fifita	5	0	(Australia) Cronulla-Sutherland Sharks
Mahe Fonua	1	0	(England) Hull F.C.
David Fusitu'a	4	20	New Zealand Warriors
Siliva Havili	5	4	(Australia) St. George Illawarra Dragons
Ata Hingano	5	18	New Zealand Warriors
William Hopoate	5	8	(Australia) Canterbury-Bankstown Bulldogs
Konrad Hurrell	4	0	(Australia) Gold Coast Titans
Michael Jennings	4	20	(Australia) Parramatta Eels
Solomone Kata	1	0	New Zealand Warriors
Sione Katoa	5	0	(Australia) Penrith Panthers
Samisoni Langi	0	0	(England) Leigh Centurions
Tuimoala Lolohea	5	14	(Australia) Wests Tigers
Sika Manu (c)	5	4	(England) Hull F.C.
Manu Ma'u	5	4	(Australia) Parramatta Eels
Sam Moa	2	0	(France) Catalans Dragons
Ben Murdoch-Masila	5	4	(England) Salford Red Devils
Joe Ofahengaue	1	0	(Australia) Brisbane Broncos
Tevita Pangai Junior	3	4	(Australia) Brisbane Broncos
Ukuma Ta'ai	1	0	(England) Huddersfield Giants
Sio Siua Taukeiaho	4	32	(Australia) Sydney Roosters
Jason Taumalolo	5	4	(Australia) North Queensland Cowboys
Peni Terepo	4	8	(Australia) Parramatta Eels
Daniel Tupou	5	8	(Australia) Sydney Roosters
Manu Vatuvei	1	0	(England) Salford Red Devils

== Pool C ==
=== Ireland ===
Head coach: (England) Mark Aston

Mikey Russell is the travelling reserve. Toby King was initially named in the squad but withdrew due to injury. He was replaced by Michael Morgan.

Player	Games	Points	Club
Kyle Amor	3	4	(England) St. Helens
Ed Chamberlain	3	0	(England) Widnes Vikings
Casey Dunne	0	0	(Ireland) Athboy Longhorns
Liam Finn (c)	3	28	(England) Wakefield Trinity
Scott Grix (vc)	3	0	(England) Wakefield Trinity
Matty Hadden	1	0	(England) Rochdale Hornets
James Hasson	2	0	(England) Wakefield Trinity
Jack Higginson	0	0	(England) Wigan Warriors
Will Hope	1	0	(England) Sheffield Eagles
Liam Kay	3	12	(Canada) Toronto Wolfpack
James Kelly	0	0	(England) Sheffield Eagles
Joe Keyes	1	0	(England) Bradford Bulls
George King	3	4	(England) Warrington Wolves
Tyrone McCarthy	2	0	(England) Salford Red Devils
Louie McCarthy-Scarsbrook	3	4	(England) St. Helens
Shannon McDonnell	3	0	(Australia) Camden Rams
Michael McIlorum	3	4	(England) Wigan Warriors
Alan McMahon	0	0	(Ireland) Waterford Vikings
Michael Morgan	2	4	(Australia) Canterbury-Bankstown Bulldogs
Anthony Mullally	3	0	(England) Leeds Rhinos
Api Pewhairangi	3	4	(England) London Broncos
Joe Philbin	3	4	(England) Warrington Wolves
Oliver Roberts	3	8	(England) Huddersfield Giants
Brad Singleton	3	0	(England) Leeds Rhinos

=== Papua New Guinea ===
Head coach: (Papua New Guinea) Michael Marum

Player	Games	Points	Club
Paul Aiton	4	4	(France) Catalans Dragons
Stanton Albert	3	0	Papua New Guinea Hunters
Wellington Albert	2	4	Papua New Guinea Hunters
Stargroth Amean	3	4	Papua New Guinea Hunters
Kurt Baptiste	4	0	(Australia) Canberra Raiders
Ase Boas (vc)	3	2	Papua New Guinea Hunters
Watson Boas	4	8	Papua New Guinea Hunters
Rod Griffin	2	4	(Australia) Canterbury-Bankstown Bulldogs
Lachlan Lam	1	8	(Australia) Sydney Roosters
Garry Lo	4	8	(England) Sheffield Eagles
Nene Macdonald	4	12	(Australia) St. George Illawarra Dragons
Enoch Maki	2	0	Papua New Guinea Hunters
Rhyse Martin	4	40	(Australia) Canterbury-Bankstown Bulldogs
David Mead (c)	4	16	(Australia) Brisbane Broncos
Moses Meninga	2	0	Papua New Guinea Hunters
Willie Minoga	3	0	Papua New Guinea Hunters
Justin Olam	4	16	(Australia) Melbourne Storm
Kato Ottio	4	4	(Australia) Canberra Raiders
Luke Page	4	0	(Australia) Burleigh Bears
Wartovo Puara Jr	1	0	Papua New Guinea Hunters
Nixon Put	1	0	Papua New Guinea Hunters
James Segeyaro	4	4	(Australia) Cronulla-Sutherland Sharks
Thompson Teteh	1	0	(Australia) Redcliffe Dolphins

=== Wales ===
Head coach: (England) John Kear

Player	Games	Points	Club
Danny Ansell	1	0	(England) Hunslet
Matt Barron	2	0	(England) Newcastle Thunder
Gavin Bennion	0	0	Rochdale Hornets
Joe Burke	2	0	(England) Oldham R.L.F.C.
Chester Butler	1	0	(England) Halifax
Michael Channing	3	0	(England) London Broncos
Courtney Davies	3	6	(England) Gloucestershire All Golds
Ben Evans	3	0	(England) London Broncos
Matty Fozard	3	0	(England) Sheffield Eagles
Andrew Gay	2	0	South Wales Ironmen
Regan Grace	3	4	(England) St. Helens
Dalton Grant	1	0	(England) London Broncos
Sam Hopkins	1	0	(England) Leigh Centurions
Phil Joseph (vc)	3	0	(England) Workington Town
Elliot Kear (vc)	3	0	(England) London Broncos
Morgan Knowles	3	4	(England) St. Helens
Craig Kopczak (c)	3	0	(England) Salford Red Devils
Rhodri Lloyd	3	0	(England) Swinton Lions
Ben Morris	2	4	(England) St. Helens
Steve Parry	3	0	(England) Gloucestershire All Golds
Josh Ralph	1	0	(Australia) Tweed Heads Seagulls
Christiaan Roets	1	0	South Wales Ironmen
Matt Seamark	1	0	(Australia) Wynnum Manly Seagulls
Rhys Williams	3	0	(England) London Broncos

== Pool D ==
=== Fiji ===
Head coach: (Australia) Mick Potter

Nabua Broncos' Etuate Bola was named as a reserve player. Sokobalavu was called into the squad following injuries to Evans and K. Sims.

Player	Games	Points	Club
Kane Evans	1	4	(Australia) Sydney Roosters
Salesi Junior Fainga'a	1	4	(Australia) Parramatta Eels
Jarryd Hayne	5	8	(Australia) Gold Coast Titans
Tui Kamikamica	5	0	(Australia) Melbourne Storm
Viliame Kikau	5	12	(Australia) Penrith Panthers
Apisai Koroisau	5	28	(Australia) Manly Warringah Sea Eagles
Joe Lovodua	4	4	(Australia) St. George Illawarra Dragons
Taane Milne	5	32	(Australia) St. George Illawarra Dragons
Sitiveni Moceidreke	0	0	(Australia) South Sydney Rabbitohs
Marcelo Montoya	5	8	(Australia) Canterbury-Bankstown Bulldogs
Kevin Naiqama (c)	5	12	(Australia) Wests Tigers
Ben Nakubuwai	5	4	(Australia) Gold Coast Titans
Henry Raiwalui	5	12	(Australia) Mount Pritchard Mounties
Mikaele Ravalawa	0	0	(Australia) Canberra Raiders
Junior Roqica	4	0	(England) London Broncos
Jacob Saifiti	5	0	(Australia) Newcastle Knights
Ashton Sims	5	0	(England) Warrington Wolves
Korbin Sims	0	0	(Australia) Brisbane Broncos
Pio Seci	0	0	(Fiji) Nabua Broncos
Pio Sokobalavu	0	0	(Australia) Wests Tigers
James Storer	1	0	(Australia) Port Kembla Blacks
Akuila Uate	5	4	(Australia) Manly Warringah Sea Eagles
Eloni Vunakece	5	4	(Australia) Sydney Roosters
Suliasi Vunivalu	5	38	(Australia) Melbourne Storm
Brayden Wiliame	4	4	Catalans Dragons

=== Italy ===
Head coach: (Australia) (Italy) Cameron Ciraldo

Italy named a squad of 33 players before shortening the squad to 24 players. Four shadow players were also named: Jake Campagnolo, Dean Parata, Ricardo Parata, and Kieran Quabba.

Player	Games	Points	Club
Daniel Alvaro	3	0	(Australia) Parramatta Eels
Mirco Bergamasco	0	0	(Italy) Saluzzo Roosters
Nathan Brown	3	0	(Australia) Parramatta Eels
Christophe Calegari	2	0	(France) Palau XIII Broncos
Terry Campese	1	0	(Australia) Queanbeyan Blues
Justin Castellaro	2	4	(Australia) Northern Pride
Gioele Celerino	0	0	(Italy) Saluzzo Roosters / (Australia) Tully Tigers
Chris Centrone	1	0	(Australia) Wyong Roos
Mason Cerruto	3	4	(Australia) Penrith Panthers
Ryan Ghietti	3	4	(Australia) Northern Pride
Gavin Hiscox	0	0	(Australia) Central Queensland Capras
Jack Johns	1	0	(Australia) Newcastle Knights
Richard Lepori	1	0	(England) Oldham R.L.F.C.
Josh Mantellato	3	28	(Australia) Wyong Roos
Nathan Milone	3	8	(Australia) Wests Tigers
Mark Minichiello (c)	3	0	(England) Hull F.C.
Joel Riethmuller	3	0	(Australia) Northern Pride
Brenden Santi	3	0	(Australia) Sydney Roosters
James Tedesco (vc)	3	8	(Australia) Wests Tigers
Joseph Tramontana	3	8	(Australia) Canterbury-Bankstown Bulldogs
Paul Vaughan	3	4	(Australia) St. George Illawarra Dragons
Shannon Wakeman	3	0	(England) Huddersfield Giants
Jayden Walker	3	0	(Australia) Cronulla-Sutherland Sharks
Colin Wilkie	1	0	(Australia) Northern Pride

=== United States ===
Head coach: (England) Brian McDermott

The Hawks continue to support the growth of rugby league in the United States by selecting fourteen players who have played in the amateur USA Rugby League competition, three of whom have since been signed by professional clubs (Burroughs, Eichner, and Offerdahl). Nine members of the squad (Faraimo, Farley, Freed, both Howard brothers, Marando, Offerdahl, Pettybourne, and Shipway) previously represented the Tomahawks at the 2013 World Cup, and three players have experience in the NRL, all of whom are eligible to represent the US through their American Samoan heritage (Faraimo, Pettybourne, and Vaivai). Samoa, also of American Samoan descent, was a late inclusion to the squad due to an injury to Matt Walsh.

Player	Games	Points	Club
Taylor Alley	1	0	(United States) Central Florida Warriors
Ryan Burroughs	3	0	(Canada) Toronto Wolfpack
CJ Cortalano	1	0	(United States) White Plains Wombats
Joe Eichner	2	0	(Canada) Toronto Wolfpack
Bureta Faraimo	3	4	New Zealand Warriors
Gabriel Farley	2	0	(United States) Philadelphia Fight
Kristian Freed	3	0	(United States) White Plains Wombats
Daniel Howard	3	0	(Australia) Wentworthville Magpies
Stephen Howard	2	0	(Australia) Mount Pritchard Mounties
Martwain Johnston	1	0	(United States) Delaware Black Foxes
Andrew Kneisly	1	0	(United States) Philadelphia Fight
Corey Makelim	3	0	(Australia) Mount Pritchard Mounties
Fotukava Malu	1	0	(United States) Atlanta Rhinos
David Marando	3	0	(Australia) Belrose Eagles
Nick Newlin	1	0	(United States) Atlanta Rhinos
Mark Offerdahl (c)	3	0	(England) London Broncos
Eddy Pettybourne	3	0	(Australia) Gold Coast Titans
Josh Rice	3	0	(United States) New York Knights
Tui Samoa	3	0	(Australia) Young Cherrypickers
Matt Shipway	2	4	(Australia) South Newcastle Lions
Sam Tochterman-Talbott	2	0	(Australia) Tweed Heads Seagulls
David Ulch	2	0	(United States) Tampa Mayhem
Taioalo "Junior" Vaivai	3	4	(Australia) Western Suburbs Red Devils
Matt Walsh	0	0	(United States) White Plains Wombats
