= 2017 Rugby League World Cup Group A =

Group A of the 2017 Rugby League World Cup is one of the four groups in the 2017 Rugby League World Cup, which began on 27 October and was completed on 12 November 2017. The group comprised hosts Australia as well as England and France. They were joined by the winner of the Middle East-Africa qualifier, Lebanon. The group was one of two weighted groups containing top seeded teams where the top 3 qualify for the quarter finals. Australia, England and Lebanon finished the group stage in these positions.

== Standings ==
Pos	Team	Pld	W	D	L	PF	PA	PD	Pts	Qualification
1	Australia (H)	3	3	0	0	104	10	+94	6	Advance to knockout stage
2	England	3	2	0	1	69	34	+35	4	Advance to knockout stage
3	Lebanon	3	1	0	2	39	81	−42	2	Advance to knockout stage
4	France	3	0	0	3	30	117	−87	0	

(H) Hosts

== Matches ==
=== Australia vs England ===
27 October 2017
20:00 AEDT (UTC+11)

Australia	18–4	England
Tries: Gillett (23') 1 Slater (29') 1 Dugan (79') 1 Goals: Smith 3/4 (25', 76' pen, 80')	Report	Tries: 1 (5') McGillvary; Goals: 0/1 Widdop

Melbourne Rectangular Stadium, Melbourne
Attendance: 22,724
Referee: Matt Cecchin (Australia)
Player of the Match: Billy Slater (Australia)

Team lists:

FB	1	Billy Slater
WG	2	Dane Gagai
CE	3	Will Chambers
CE	4	Josh Dugan
WG	5	Valentine Holmes
FE	6	Michael Morgan
HB	7	Cooper Cronk
PR	8	Aaron Woods
HK	9	Cameron Smith (c)
PR	10	David Klemmer
SR	11	Boyd Cordner
SR	12	Matt Gillett
LK	13	Jake Trbojevic
Substitutes:
IC	14	Wade Graham
IC	15	Jordan McLean
IC	16	Josh McGuire
IC	17	Tyson Frizell
Coach:
(Australia) Mal Meninga

FB	1	Jonny Lomax
WG	2	Jermaine McGillvary
CE	3	Kallum Watkins
CE	4	John Bateman
WG	5	Ryan Hall
FE	6	Gareth Widdop
HB	7	Luke Gale
PR	8	Chris Hill
HK	9	Josh Hodgson
PR	10	James Graham
SR	11	Sam Burgess
SR	12	Elliott Whitehead
LK	13	Sean O'Loughlin (c)
Substitutes:
IC	15	Chris Heighington
IC	16	Thomas Burgess
IC	17	James Roby
IC	18	Ben Currie
Coach:
(Australia) Wayne Bennett

=== France vs Lebanon ===
29 October 2017
16:00 AEDT (UTC+11)

France	18–29	Lebanon
Tries: Ader (16', 52') 2 Cardace (68') 1 Goals: Barthau 3/4 (20' pen, 53', 69')	Report	Tries: 2 (40', 80') Robinson; 1 (8') Layoun; 1 (63') Doueihi; 1 (76') Moses; Goals: 4/5 Moses (9', 40', 64', 77'); Field Goals: 1 (74') Moses

Canberra Stadium, Canberra
Attendance: 5,492
Referee: Gerard Sutton (Australia)
Player of the Match: Mitchell Moses (Lebanon)

Team lists:

FB	1	Mark Kheirallah
WG	2	Fouad Yaha
CE	3	Bastien Ader
CE	4	Damien Cardace
WG	5	Ilias Bergal
FE	6	Theo Fages (c)
HB	7	William Barthau
PR	8	Antoni Maria
HK	9	Éloi Pélissier
PR	10	Julian Bousquet
SR	11	Benjamin Garcia
SR	12	Benjamin Jullien
LK	13	Jason Baitieri
Substitutes:
IC	14	Clément Boyer
IC	15	Nabil Djalout
IC	16	Thibaut Margalet
IC	17	Lucas Albert
Coach:
(France) Aurelien Cologni

FB	1	Anthony Layoun
WG	2	Travis Robinson
CE	3	James Elias
CE	4	Jason Wehbe
WG	5	Abbas Miski
FE	6	Mitchell Moses
HB	7	Robbie Farah (c)
PR	8	Tim Mannah
HK	17	Andrew Kazzi
PR	14	Mitchell Mamary
SR	16	Jaleel Seve-Derbas
SR	12	Ahmad Ellaz
LK	13	Nick Kassis
Substitutes:
IC	9	Michael Lichaa
IC	10	Alex Twal
IC	15	Elias Sukkar
IC	18	Adam Doueihi
Coach:
(Australia) Brad Fittler

Notes:

- Lebanon's victory over France was their first ever win at a World Cup.

=== Australia vs France ===
3 November 2017
20:00 AEDT (UTC+11)

Australia	52–6	France
Tries: Graham (12', 15', 31', 66') 4 Munster (43', 74') 2 Dugan (33') 1 Frizell (49') 1 Slater (52') 1 Holmes (78') 1 Goals: Smith 6/8 (16', 32', 44', 51', 53', 67'); Munster 0/2	Report	Tries: 1 (24') Kheirallah; Goals: 1/1 Marginet (25')

Canberra Stadium, Canberra
Attendance: 12,293
Referee: Robert Hicks (England)
Player of the Match: Wade Graham (Australia)

Team lists:

FB	1	Billy Slater
WG	2	Tom Trbojevic
CE	3	Will Chambers
CE	4	Josh Dugan
WG	5	Josh Mansour
FE	6	Michael Morgan
HB	14	Cameron Munster
PR	8	Jordan McLean
HK	9	Cameron Smith (c)
PR	10	Reagan Campbell-Gillard
SR	11	Wade Graham
SR	12	Tyson Frizell
LK	13	Josh McGuire
Substitutes:
IC	15	Felise Kaufusi
IC	16	Aaron Woods
IC	17	David Klemmer
IC	18	Valentine Holmes
Coach:
(Australia) Mal Meninga

FB	1	Mark Kheirallah
WG	2	Fouad Yaha
CE	3	Bastien Ader
CE	4	Olivier Arnaud
WG	5	Ilias Bergal
FE	6	Rémy Marginet
HB	7	Theo Fages (c)
PR	13	Jason Baitieri
HK	17	John Boudebza
PR	10	Julian Bousquet
SR	11	Benjamin Garcia
SR	12	Benjamin Jullien
LK	15	Mickaël Rouch
Substitutes:
IC	8	Maxime Hérold
IC	9	Éloi Pélissier
IC	14	Thibaut Margalet
IC	16	Romain Navarrete
Coach:
(France) Aurelien Cologni

=== England vs Lebanon ===
4 November 2017
20:00 AEDT (UTC+11)

England	29–10	Lebanon
Tries: Watkins (9') 1 McGillvary (25') 1 Hall (28') 1 Currie (32') 1 T. Burgess (56') 1 Goals: Widdop 4/5 (11', 26', 33', 57'); Field Goals: Widdop (80') 1	Report	Tries: 1 (18') Kassis; 1 (76') Wehbe; Goals: 1/2 Moses (19')

Sydney Football Stadium, Sydney
Attendance: 10,237
Referee: Ben Thaler (England)
Player of the Match: Josh Hodgson (England)

Team lists:

FB	21	Stefan Ratchford
WG	2	Jermaine McGillvary
CE	3	Kallum Watkins
CE	4	John Bateman
WG	5	Ryan Hall
FE	6	Gareth Widdop
HB	7	Luke Gale
PR	8	Chris Hill
HK	9	Josh Hodgson
PR	10	James Graham
SR	11	Ben Currie
SR	12	Elliott Whitehead
LK	13	Sean O'Loughlin (c)
Substitutes:
IC	14	Alex Walmsley
IC	15	Chris Heighington
IC	16	Thomas Burgess
IC	18	George Williams
Coach:
(Australia) Wayne Bennett

FB	1	Daniel Abou-Sleiman
WG	2	Travis Robinson
CE	3	Bilal Maarbani
CE	4	Adam Doueihi
WG	5	Abbas Miski
FE	6	Mitchell Moses
HB	7	Robbie Farah (c)
PR	8	Tim Mannah
HK	16	Jamie Clark
PR	14	Mitchell Mamary
SR	10	Alex Twal
SR	12	Ahmad Ellaz
LK	13	Nick Kassis
Substitutes:
IC	9	Michael Lichaa
IC	15	Ray Moujalli
IC	17	Jason Wehbe
IC	18	Elias Sukkar
Coach:
(Australia) Brad Fittler

=== Australia vs Lebanon ===
11 November 2017
20:00 AEDT (UTC+11)

Australia	34–0	Lebanon
Tries: Munster (9', 50') 2 Maloney (25') 1 Cordner (55') 1 Gagai (76') 1 T. Trbojevic (79') 1 Goals: Maloney 4/4 (52', 56', 78', 80'); Smith 1/2 (26')	Report

Sydney Football Stadium, Sydney
Attendance: 21,127
Referee: James Child (England)
Player of the Match: Reagan Campbell-Gillard (Australia)

Team lists:

FB	1	Valentine Holmes
WG	2	Dane Gagai
CE	3	Tom Trbojevic
CE	4	Cameron Munster
WG	5	Josh Mansour
FE	6	James Maloney
HB	7	Cooper Cronk
PR	8	Aaron Woods
HK	9	Cameron Smith (c)
PR	10	David Klemmer
SR	11	Boyd Cordner
SR	12	Matt Gillett
LK	13	Felise Kaufusi
Substitutes:
IC	14	Ben Hunt
IC	15	Jordan McLean
IC	16	Reagan Campbell-Gillard
IC	17	Wade Graham
Coach:
(Australia) Mal Meninga

FB	1	Anthony Layoun
WG	19	Danny Barakat
CE	3	James Elias
CE	4	Adam Doueihi
WG	5	Abbas Miski
FE	6	Mitchell Moses
HB	7	Robbie Farah (c)
PR	8	Tim Mannah
HK	9	Michael Lichaa
PR	15	Ray Moujalli
SR	11	Chris Saab
SR	12	Ahmad Ellaz
LK	16	Jamie Clark
Substitutes:
IC	10	Alex Twal
IC	14	Mitchell Mamary
IC	17	Andrew Kazzi
IC	17	Jason Wehbe
Coach:
(Australia) Brad Fittler

=== England vs France ===
12 November 2017
18:00 AWST (UTC+8)

England	36–6	France
Tries: McGillvary (42', 64') 2 Widdop (3') 1 Ratchford (6') 1 Graham (9') 1 Percival (23') 1 Bateman (29') 1 Goals: Widdop 4/7 (4', 7', 10', 43')	Report	Tries: 1 (34') Garcia; Goals: 1/1 Albert (35')

Perth Rectangular Stadium, Perth
Attendance: 14,744
Referee: Phil Bentham (England)
Player of the Match: Gareth Widdop (England)

Team lists:

FB	1	Gareth Widdop
WG	2	Stefan Ratchford
CE	3	Mark Percival
CE	4	John Bateman
WG	5	Jermaine McGillvary
FE	6	Kevin Brown
HB	7	Luke Gale
PR	8	Chris Hill
HK	9	James Roby
PR	10	James Graham
SR	11	Ben Currie
SR	12	Mike McMeeken
LK	13	Sean O'Loughlin (c)
Substitutes:
IC	14	Alex Walmsley
IC	15	Thomas Burgess
IC	16	Scott Taylor
IC	17	George Williams
Coach:
(Australia) Wayne Bennett

FB	1	Mark Kheirallah
WG	2	Fouad Yaha
CE	3	Bastien Ader
CE	12	Benjamin Jullien
WG	5	Ilias Bergal
FE	6	Theo Fages (c)
HB	7	Lucas Albert
PR	8	Antoni Maria
HK	9	John Boudebza
PR	16	Maxime Hérold
SR	11	Benjamin Garcia
SR	10	Julian Bousquet
LK	13	Jason Baitieri
Substitutes:
IC	14	Romain Navarrete
IC	15	Thibaut Margalet
IC	19	Mickaël Rouch
IC	20	Nabil Djalout
Coach:
(France) Aurelien Cologni
