= Jon Mannah =

Australian rugby league footballer

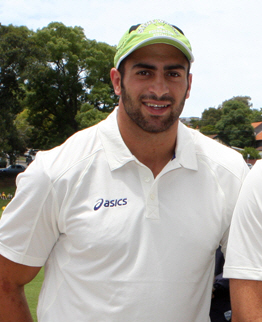
- Mannah in 2011

Personal information
- Full name: Jonathan Mannah
- Born: 13 September 1989 Sydney, New South Wales, Australia
- Died: 18 January 2013 (aged 23) Sydney, New South Wales, Australia

Playing information
- Height: 1.86 m (6 ft 1 in)
- Weight: 107 kg (16 st 12 lb)
- Position: Prop
Club
Years	Team	Pld	T	G	FG	P
2009–11	Cronulla Sharks	24	2	0	0	8
2012	Parramatta Eels	0	0	0	0	0
	Total	24	2	0	0	8
- Relatives: Tim Mannah (brother)

Jonathan Mannah (13 September 1989 – 18 January 2013) was an Australian professional rugby league footballer. He played as a prop for the Cronulla-Sutherland Sharks (2009–2011) and the Parramatta Eels (2012) in the National Rugby League (NRL). Since 2013, the Johnny Mannah Cup, which is named in his honour, is annually competed for by both clubs he played for.

== Early life ==
Mannah was born in Sydney, New South Wales, to a Lebanese Australian family. He was the younger brother of former Parramatta Eels captain Tim Mannah. Like his brother Tim, he also attended Christian Community High School and served as vice-captain in his last year of high school during 2007.

== Professional playing career ==
The brothers both played for the Parramatta Eels through the junior ranks before Jon joined the Cronulla-Sutherland Sharks just prior to the commencement of the 2009 NRL season from Parramatta. In 2011, he scored his first try in first grade for Cronulla in round 3 against the Penrith Panthers. In November 2011, after amassing 24 appearances in three seasons with the Sharks he signed with Parramatta, returning to his junior club and to play with his brother, Tim.

Mannah qualified for Lebanon through heritage and was named in the Lebanon squad for the 2013 Rugby League World Cup qualifying tournament.

== Illness and death ==
Mannah was first diagnosed in 2009 with Hodgkin's lymphoma. His illness may have been accelerated by a purportedly performance-enhancing peptide which Stephen Dank administered to him. Mannah died of the disease on 18 January 2013 at age 23. His funeral was held at Faith Baptist Church in Regents Park, Sydney, on 21 January 2013.

== Johnny Mannah Cup ==
In his short career, Mannah played for both the Parramatta Eels and Cronulla-Sutherland Sharks clubs. The two clubs together introduced the Johnny Mannah Cup in his memory, to be competed for annually the first time those two clubs meet in a season.
