= Johnny Mannah Cup =

- Johnny Mannah Cup, 2020
- Location: Sydney
- Teams: Parramatta Eels; Cronulla-Sutherland Sharks
- First meeting: Round 5, 2013; Eels 13–6 Sharks
- Latest meeting: Round 9, 2025; Sharks 28 –18 Eels
- Next meeting: Round TBC, 2026
- Stadiums: Various Sydney venues

Statistics
- Total meetings: 13
- All-time series: Parramatta Eels: 6 Cronulla Sharks: 7 Drawn: 0
- Largest victory: Eels 28–4 Sharks (2021)

The Johnny Mannah Cup is a trophy contested annually in a game between the National Rugby League's Parramatta Eels and Cronulla-Sutherland Sharks clubs.

== Background ==
The trophy was introduced in the 2013 NRL season to commemorate Johnny Mannah following his death in January 2013 from Hodgkin's lymphoma, as Mannah had played for both clubs during his short career.

== Head-to-head ==
As of March 2022

Team	Played	Games won	Games lost	Draws	PF	PA	PD
Parramatta Eels	13	6	7	0	239	209	+30
Cronulla-Sutherland Sharks	13	7	6	0	209	239	–30

== Results ==
Season	Score	Winner	Venue	Attendance	Ref.
2013	13–6	Parramatta Eels	Parramatta Stadium	11,063	
2014	42–24	Parramatta Eels	Parramatta Stadium	12,541	
2015	28–35	Cronulla-Sutherland Sharks	Parramatta Stadium	11,778	
2016	34–24	Cronulla-Sutherland Sharks	Endeavour Field	19,124	
2017	6–20	Cronulla-Sutherland Sharks	Stadium Australia	17,003	
2018	14–4	Cronulla-Sutherland Sharks	Stadium Australia	25,106	
2019	24–12	Parramatta Eels	Stadium Australia	11,185	
2020	14–12	Parramatta Eels	Jubilee Oval	1,714	
2021	28–4	Parramatta Eels	Western Sydney Stadium	19,236	
2022	18–16	Cronulla-Sutherland Sharks	Endeavour Field	11,459	
2023	30–26	Cronulla-Sutherland Sharks	Western Sydney Stadium	16,663	
2024	34–22	Parramatta Eels	Western Sydney Stadium	11,665	
2025	28–18	Cronulla-Sutherland Sharks	Suncorp Stadium	48,359	

== See also ==
- Jon Mannah – The player after whom this Cup is named.
- Tim Mannah – The older brother of Johnny, who also played for the Parramatta Eels for 11 years: 2009–2019. During this time the Eels team he was a part of won this Cup three times: 2013, 2014, & 2019.
