= Hadj Boudebza =

France international rugby league player

Personal information
- Born: 1 October 1966 (age 58); Saint-Laurent-de-la-Salanque, Occitania, France

Playing information
- Position: Prop
Club
Years	Team	Pld	T	G	FG	P
19??–??	Saint-Hippolyte
199?–??	AS Saint-Estève
1996–??	Paris Saint-Germain
19??–??	Limoux
	Total	0	0	0	0	0
Representative
Years	Team	Pld	T	G	FG	P
1994–97	France	6	0	0	0	0
- Relatives: John Boudebza (son)

Hadj Boudebza (born in Saint-Laurent-de-la-Salanque, on 1 October 1966) is a French former professional rugby league footballer who represented France at the 1995 World Cup.

== Playing career ==
Boudebza played for Paris Saint-Germain in the 1996 Super League and in 1997 played in the Super League World Nines.

He played for France in six test matches between 1994 and 1997, including in one match at the 1995 World Cup.

== Personal life ==
Outside the field, he worked in the family-owned meat business directed by Bernard Guasch.

His son, John is also a French rugby league international. His other son, Jordan also practiced rugby league, while his youngest son, Hugo, played both rugby codes.

== Honours ==
=== Team honours ===
- French Champion : 1993 (Saint-Estève).
- Winner of the Lord Derby Cup : 1993, 1994 and 1995 (Saint-Estève).
- Runner-up at the French Championship : 1992, 1995 and 1996 (Saint-Estève).
- Runner-up at the Lord Derby Cup : 1997 (Limoux).
