= Alex Twal =

Lebanon international rugby league footballer

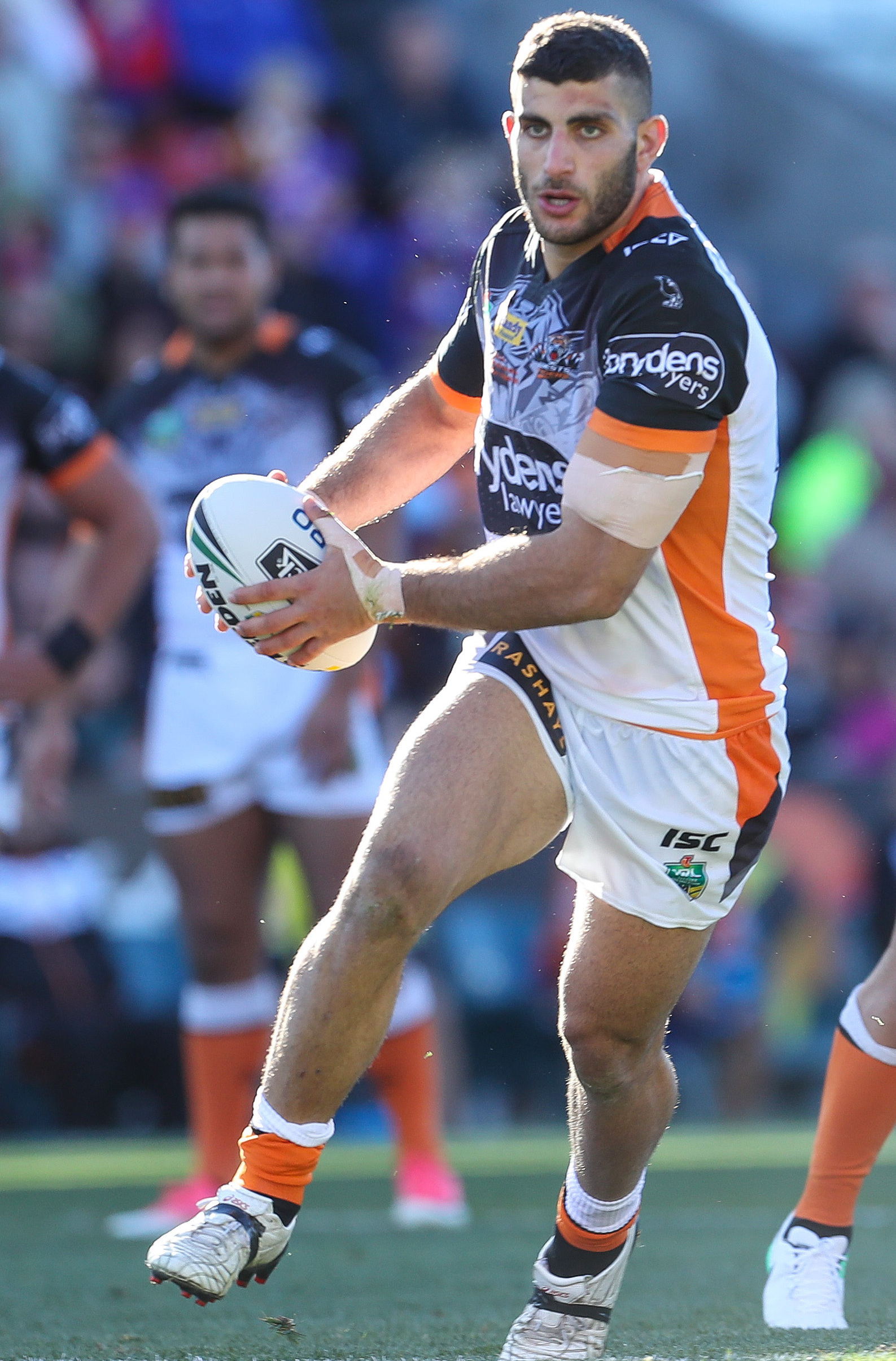

Personal information
- Born: 3 July 1996 (age 30) Westmead, New South Wales, Australia
- Height: 190 cm (6 ft 3 in)
- Weight: 104 kg (16 st 5 lb)

Playing information
- Position: Prop, Lock
Club
Years	Team	Pld	T	G	FG	P
2017–	Wests Tigers	181	2	0	0	8
Representative
Years	Team	Pld	T	G	FG	P
2017–	Lebanon	7	0	0	0	0
- Source: As of 22 November 2026

Alex Twal (born 3 July 1996) is a Lebanon international rugby league footballer who plays as a prop and lock for the Wests Tigers in the NRL.

== Background ==
Twal was born in Westmead, New South Wales, Australia to a Jordanian father and a Lebanese mother. He attended St Patrick's College, Strathfield and then Parramatta Marist High School. He was a AFL prospect at the age of 7 and coincidentally met his international teammate Mitchell Moses at a Sydney Swans training Camp in 2007

== Playing career ==
=== Early Into His Career ===
A Parramatta City Titans junior, Twal played in the Holden Cup for the Parramatta Eels and was part of their extended first grade squad in 2015 and 2016. He played for the New South Wales under-20s and the Junior Kangaroos in both 2015 and 2016.

=== 2017 ===
Twal signed for the Wests Tigers midway through the 2017 season, from 2018 the end of 2020, before being granted an early release from Parramatta mid-season. He made his first grade debut on 2 July, one day before his 21st birthday, and played in the Tigers remaining eight games for the season, "putting in some seriously consistent performances off the bench." With 249 tackles made and only 5 missed, Twal had the best tackle percentage in the NRL over the regular season.

At season's end, Twal was selected for Lebanon in the World Cup. Teammate Tim Mannah said, "He reminds me of Nathan Brown where his personality is huge, and he's a player players love to play with. He brings a lot to a team. The Tigers are lucky to have him. He'll have a really strong career in the NRL." Coach Brad Fittler added, "He plays big minutes for a front-rower, he has a great work ethic, he's a top kid." After the pool rounds, he was leading the competition in tackles made.

=== 2018 ===
Twal made 21 appearances for Wests in 2018 as the club finished 9th on the table at the end of the regular season and missed out on the finals. He again led the competition with his effective tackle percentage.

=== 2019 ===
After round 17, Twal was rated as the 3rd hardest working player in the NRL. It was said, "Twal continues to keep producing in frightening statistics that continue to improve. The Lebanon international hasn't missed a single tackle since round 10 of the competition."

Twal made 24 appearances for Wests in the 2019 NRL season as the club finished ninth on the table and missed out on the finals. The club went into the final game of the season knowing that a win over Cronulla would guarantee themselves a finals place but they were defeated 25–8 at Leichhardt Oval.

On 19 November, Twal signed a two-year contract extension to stay with the club until the end of the 2022 season.

=== 2020 ===
Twal played 12 games for Wests in the 2020 NRL season as the club missed out on the finals by finishing 11th.

=== 2021 ===
Twal played a total of 23 games for the Wests Tigers in the 2021 NRL season as the club finished 13th and missed the finals.

=== 2022 ===
On 16 July, Twal was ruled out for the remainder of the 2022 NRL season due to three concussions he sustained throughout the year.

=== 2023 ===
In round 16 of the 2023 NRL season, Twal scored his first NRL try, playing against the Melbourne Storm in his 116th game. He grabbed a loose ball in the opponent's goal after a bomb. It was written, "Twal's dry spell had become so well publicised that even the referee and Storm players were caught up in the euphoria of the moment." Twal said after the match, "It's been a long seven or eight years, playing week in and week out and never getting a try. I've found the humour in it. It was a bit of a bittersweet moment, I would have much rather come away with the result. But it was good to get the monkey off my back." Twal played a total of 22 games for the Wests Tigers in the 2023 NRL season as the club finished with the Wooden Spoon for a second straight year. On 13 October, it was reported that Twal had signed a three-year contract extension to remain at the Wests Tigers until the end of the 2027 season.

=== 2024 ===
Twal scored his second career try during the round 12 match of the 2024 season in Wests Tigers loss to North Queensland. Twal played 18 games for the Wests Tigers throughout the 2024 NRL season as the club finished with the Wooden Spoon for a third consecutive year.

=== 2025 ===
In round 18 of the 2025 NRL season, Twal captained his first game for the Wests Tigers in their upset 30–28 victory against the Sydney Roosters. Twal played 23 games for the Wests Tigers in the 2025 NRL season as the club finished 13th on the table.

=== 2026 ===
On 11 February 2026, the Tigers announced that Twal had re-signed with the club until the end of 2029. Coach Benji Marshall said, "This extension is a testament to the loyalty, hard work and dedication Alex has given our club. He deserves the opportunity to be a one-club player, which is rare to find in this day and age. It’s a privilege to have him as part of our club."

With Wests Tigers winning 4 of their first 5 games, and sitting second on the ladder, Twal's performances gained attention. The ABC said, "Twal has played like a machine. He's averaging career highs per game in runs, run metres, tackle busts, offloads and tackles with a run of form as good as any lock in the competition. He's still trucking it up, working hard and doing all the things he's always done but the scale of the improvement is astonishing. His average run metres are up from 81 per game two years ago to 120 this season."

== Statistics ==
Year	Team	Games	Tries	Pts
2017	Wests Tigers	9		
2018	Wests Tigers	21		
2019	Wests Tigers	24		
2020	Wests Tigers	12		
2021	Wests Tigers	23		
2022	Wests Tigers	13		
2023	Wests Tigers	22	1	4
2024	Wests Tigers	18	1	4
2025	Wests Tigers	23		
2026	Wests Tigers	16		
2027	Wests Tigers			
	Totals	181	2	8

*denotes season competing
