= Bastien Ader =

France international rugby league footballer

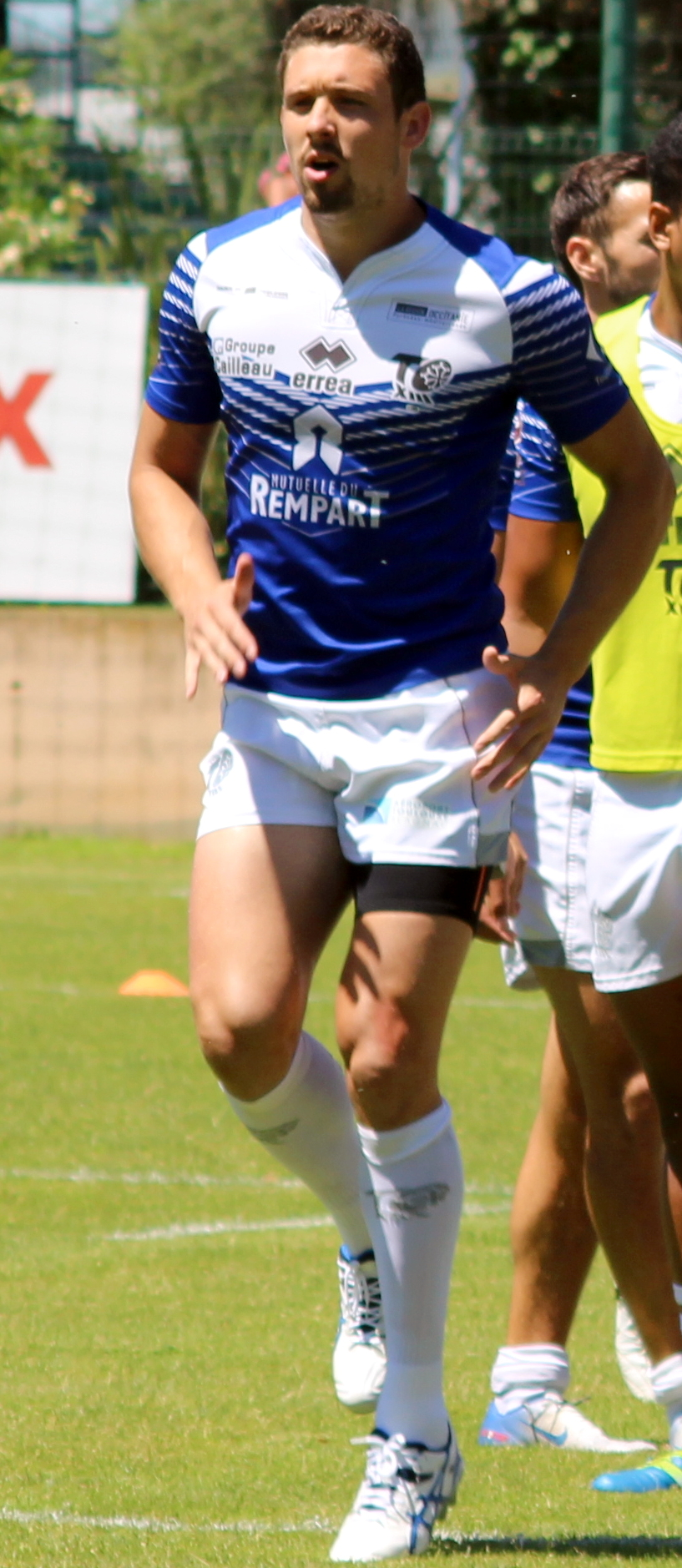

Personal information
- Born: 6 June 1991 (age 35) France
- Height: 6 ft 1 in (1.86 m)
- Weight: 14 st 11 lb (94 kg)

Playing information
- Position: Centre, Wing
Club
Years	Team	Pld	T	G	FG	P
2009–11	Saint-Gaudens	20	8	0	0	32
2011–12	Toulouse Olympique Broncos	2	0	0	0	0
2012–21	Toulouse Olympique	141	67	1	0	206
2015(loan)	→ Toulouse Olympique Broncos	10	4	0	0	16
2021	Limoux Grizzlies	0	0	0	0	0
	Total	173	79	1	0	254
Representative
Years	Team	Pld	T	G	FG	P
2017–	France	5	4	0	0	16
- Source: As of 29 April 2018

Bastien Ader (born 6 June 1991) is a French rugby league footballer who plays as a centre or on the wing for Limoux Grizzlies in the Super XIII. He previously spent 10 years with Toulouse Olympique in both Elite 1 and the RFL Championship and began his career at Saint Gaudens XIII.

== Club career ==
=== Saint Gaudens XIII ===
Ader debuted for St Gaudens on 3 October 2009 in the 34-10 defeat at Limoux and played once more that season, away at Carcassonne. He made a further 18 appearances in the 2010/11 season before signing for Toulouse.

=== Toulouse Olympique Broncos ===
He joined Toulouse in 2011 and made his debut in the 22-0 defeat away at Avignon on 9 December 2011 in Elite 1. At the end of 2011, Toulouse left the English Championship and returned to the French league. Ader played 10 games in Elite 1 at the start of the 2015/16 for the Broncos in the hiatus between the end of the 2014/15 season and Toulouse returning to the English competition in 2016.

=== Toulouse Olympique ===
Ader played in the first team from 2012/13 until 2020 in Elite 1, League 1 and the RFL Championship. He did not appear for Toulouse in the 2021 promotion winning season. On 20 September 2021, Toulouse announced that Ader would be leaving the club at the end of the season after 10 years

=== Limoux Grizzlies ===
Limoux announced that Ader had signed up for the 2021/22 season having left Toulouse.

== International career ==
Ader was named in the French squad for the 2017 Rugby League World Cup. He played in all three group matches and was the top scorer for France with two tries.
