= Thibaut Margalet =

France international rugby league footballer

Personal information
- Born: 3 January 1993 (age 32); Ille-sur-Têt, Pyrénées-Orientales, Languedoc-Roussillon, France
- Height: 5 ft 11 in (181 cm)
- Weight: 15 st 10 lb (100 kg)

Playing information
- Position: Prop, Loose forward
Club
Years	Team	Pld	T	G	FG	P
2013-19	Saint-Esteve XIII Catalan	77	7	5	0	38
2013–19	Catalans Dragons	28	0	0	0	0
2016(loan)	→ Sheffield Eagles	9	1	0	0	4
2019–20	Ille-sur-Têt XIII	0	0	0	0	0
2020–21	FC Lezignan	0	0	0	0	0
	Total	114	8	5	0	42
Representative
Years	Team	Pld	T	G	FG	P
2017	France	3	0	0	0	0
- Source: As of 21 July 2019

Thibaut Margalet (born 3 January 1993) is a French professional rugby league footballer who plays as a prop or loose forward.

He previously played for Ille-sur-Têt XIII in the Elite Two Championship, Sheffield Eagles in the Championship. and for FC Lezignan in the Elite One Championship.

== Playing career ==
=== FC Lezignan ===
On 19 June 2020 it was reported that Thibaut, together with his brother Tristan, had both joined FC Lezignan in the Elite One Championship

=== Ille-sur-Têt ===
In 2021, Margalet re-joined Ille-sur-Têt XIII in Elite 2. In December 2023, Margalet was called up to play in Elite 1 for Saint-Estève XIII Catalan through the partnership agreement with Ille.
