= Anthony Layoun =

Lebanon international rugby league footballer

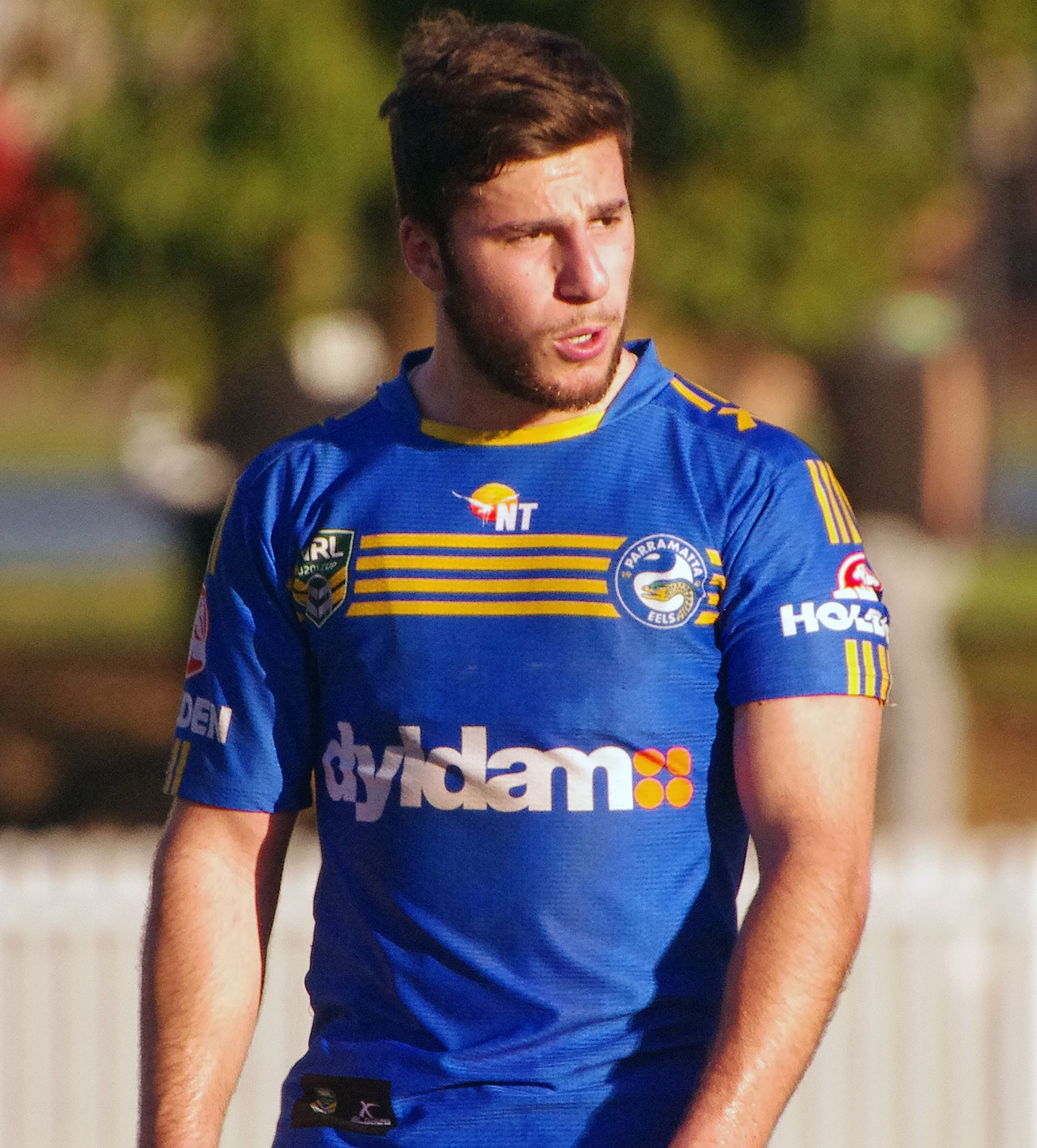

Personal information
- Full name: Anthony Layoun
- Born: 7 February 1997 (age 29) Sydney, New South Wales, Australia
- Height: 181 cm (5 ft 11 in)
- Weight: 86 kg (13 st 8 lb)

Playing information
- Position: Fullback
Representative
Years	Team	Pld	T	G	FG	P
2017–	Lebanon	6	1	0	0	4
- Source: As of 4 November 2022

Anthony Layoun (born 7 February 1997) is a Lebanon international rugby league footballer who plays for St Mary's Saints in the Ron Massey Cup.

He was selected to represent the Lebanon in the 2017 Rugby League World Cup.

== Playing career ==
Layoun played his junior rugby league with Merrylands Maulers and Wentworthville Magpies and represented the Australian Schoolboys under-15s team in 2012.

Layoun played in the Eels 2017 Under 20s grand final loss to Manly Warringah Sea Eagles 20–16.

In 2019, Layoun joined the Mount Pritchard Mounties in the Canterbury Cup NSW On 6 May 2019, Layoun was selected for the Ron Massey Cup representative side to play against Newcastle Rebels.

On 13 September 2025, Layoun played in St Mary's Ron Massey Cup Grand Final victory over Wentworthville.
