= Michael Lichaa =

Lebanon international rugby league footballer

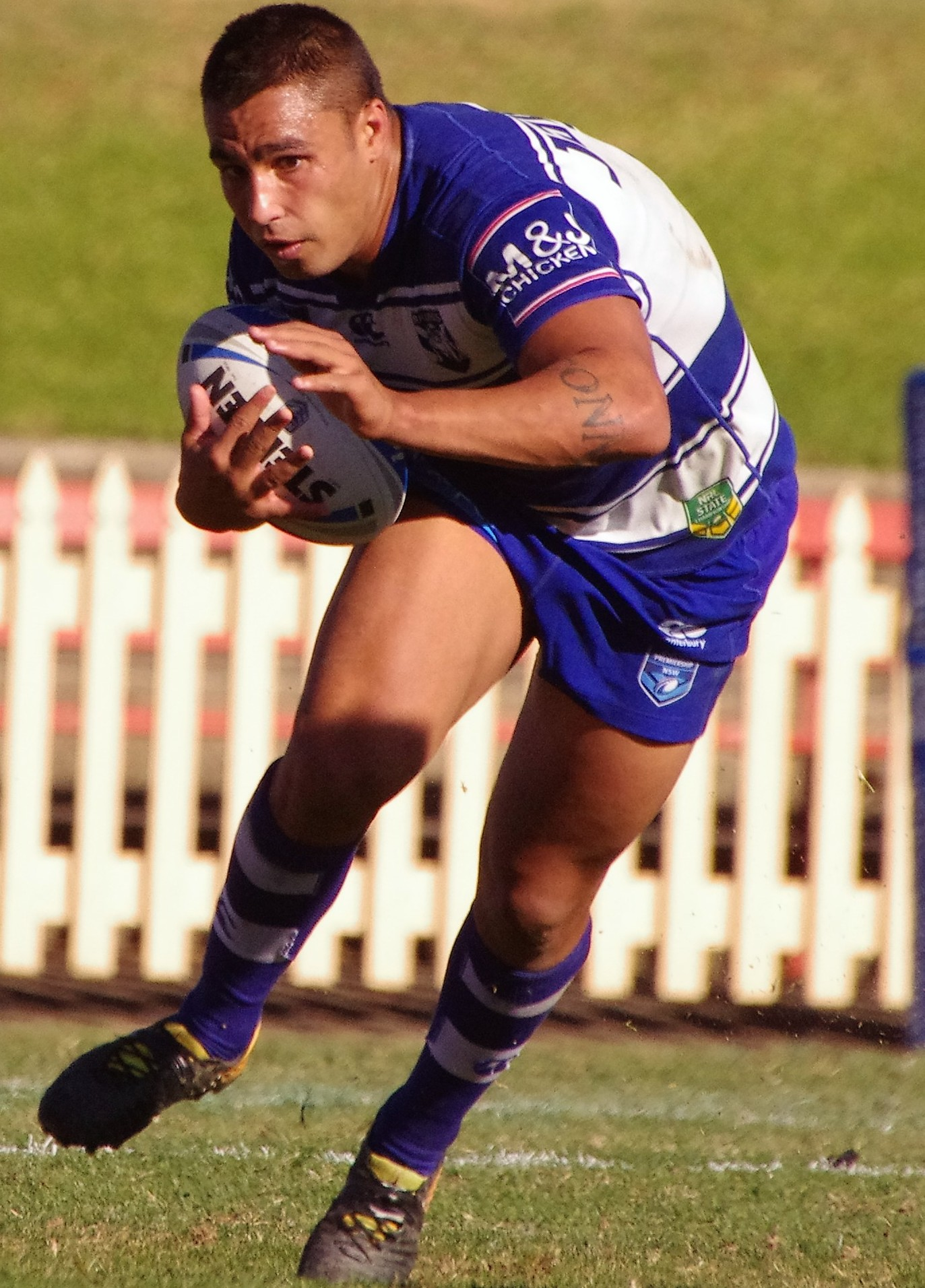

Personal information
- Born: 18 July 1993 (age 33) Wollongong, New South Wales, Australia
- Height: 183 cm (6 ft 0 in)
- Weight: 90 kg (14 st 2 lb)

Playing information
- Position: Hooker
Club
Years	Team	Pld	T	G	FG	P
2014	Cronulla Sharks	15	0	0	0	0
2015–19	Canterbury Bulldogs	98	9	0	0	36
	Total	113	9	0	0	36
Representative
Years	Team	Pld	T	G	FG	P
2014	NSW City	1	0	0	0	0
2017–19	Lebanon	5	1	0	0	4
- Source: As of 12 August 2019

Michael Lichaa (born 18 July 1993) is a Lebanon international rugby league footballer who plays as a hooker.

He has previously played for the Cronulla-Sutherland Sharks and the Canterbury-Bankstown Bulldogs in the NRL. Lichaa has played for New South Wales City.

== Background ==
Lichaa was born in Wollongong, New South Wales, Australia.

Lichaa is of Lebanese descent and played his junior football for the Cronulla-Caringbah Junior Rugby League Football Club and Yarrawarrah Tigers, before being signed by the Cronulla-Sutherland Sharks.

== Playing career ==
=== Early career ===
From 2011 to 2013, Lichaa played for the Cronulla-Sutherland Sharks' NYC team. On 21 April 2012, he played for the New South Wales under-20s team against Queensland. He was named at hooker in the 2012 NYC Team of the Year. On 13 October 2012, he played for the Junior Kangaroos against the Junior Kiwis.

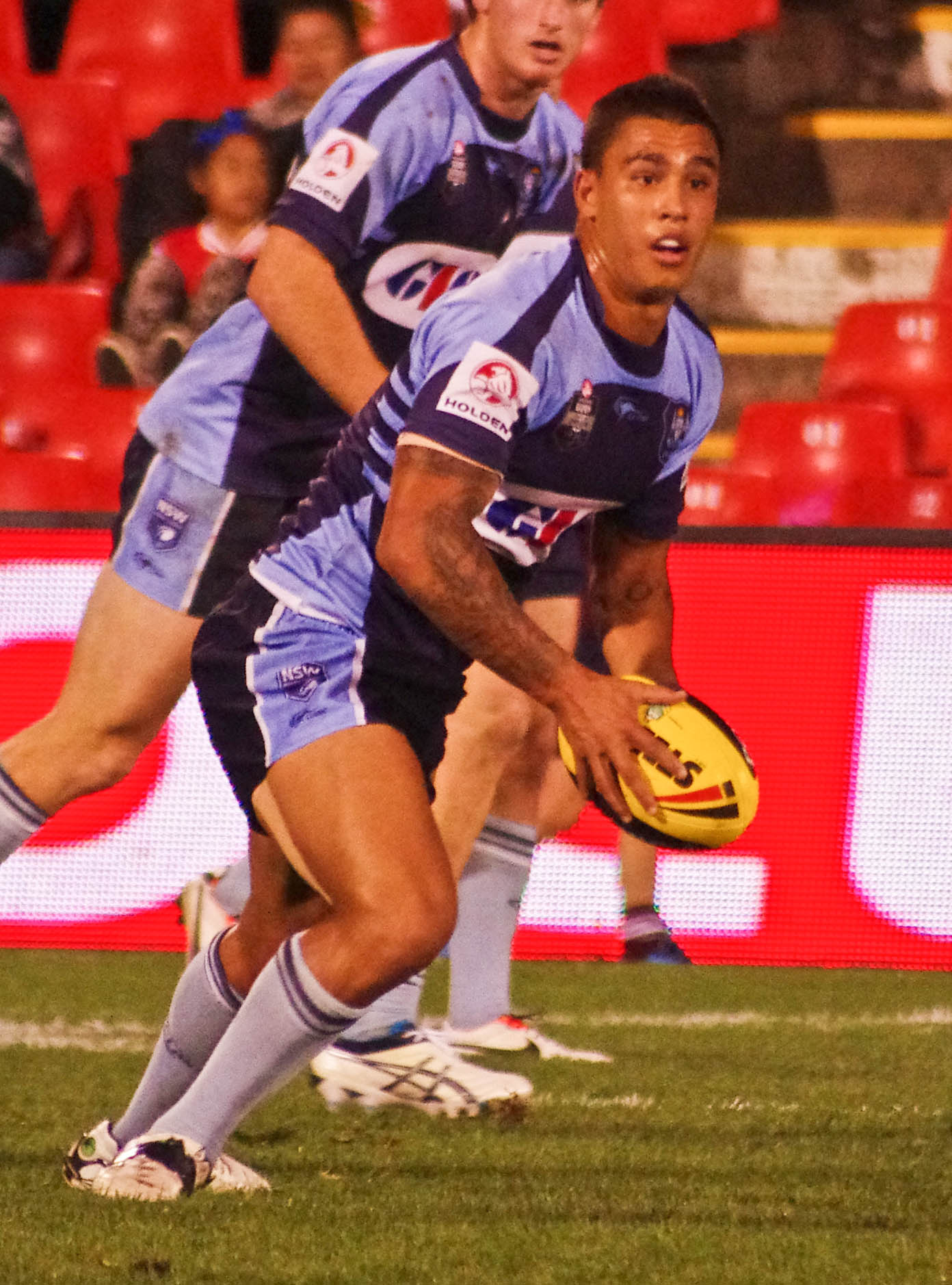
Lichaa playing for the New South Wales under-20s in 2013

On 20 April 2013, he again played for the New South Wales under-20s team against the Queensland under-20s team. He was again named at hooker in the 2013 NYC Team of the Year. On 13 October 2013, he again played for the Junior Kangaroos against the Junior Kiwis. In 2014, he moved on to the Sharks' New South Wales Cup team. In February 2014, he played for the Sharks in the inaugural Auckland Nines tournament.

=== 2014 ===
In round 2 of the 2014 NRL season, Lichaa made his NRL debut for Cronulla-Sutherland against the Canterbury-Bankstown Bulldogs off the interchange bench in the club's 42-4 loss at ANZ Stadium. Soon after, he signed a 3-year contract with Canterbury starting in 2015. Two days after the signing was made public, he was dropped from the first-grade team by coach Peter Sharp for a "lack of loyalty". Lichaa was brought back into the team in Round 7, playing off the interchange bench. On 4 May, after only playing three NRL games, he played for New South Wales City against New South Wales Country in the 2014 City vs Country Origin match at Apex Oval in Dubbo, playing off the interchange bench in the 26-26 draw. He finished off his debut year in the NRL having played in 15 matches for Cronulla.

=== 2015 ===
Lichaa made his first pre-season appearance for Canterbury in the 2015 NRL Auckland Nines. In Round 1 of the 2015 NRL season, he made his Canterbury debut against the Penrith Panthers, playing at hooker in the club's 24-18 loss at Penrith Stadium. In Round 4 against the Wests Tigers, he scored his first NRL career try in the Bulldogs' 25-24 golden-point extra time win at ANZ Stadium. In Round 23 against the Gold Coast Titans, he suffered a season ending lower leg injury. He scored 3 tries from 21 matches in his first year with the Bulldogs. He was named in the Lebanon 48-man train-on squad ahead of two 2017 Rugby League World Cup qualifiers against South Africa, however he didn't take part in either match.

=== 2016 ===
Lichaa finished the 2016 NRL season with him playing in 22 matches and scoring 3 tries for Canterbury-Bankstown.

=== 2017 ===
In February 2017, Lichaa was selected in Canterbury's 2017 NRL Auckland Nines squad. Towards the end of the season, Lichaa was struggling with form and was told by Des Hasler he was unwanted for next season until Hasler was terminated as Canterbury coach shortly thereafter. Lichaa said to Fox Sports “I got farewelled with three games to go and something clicked in my head and I went out and played my own game, “I think I finished the year showing the type of player that I am, and hopefully come round one, through to round 26 and the finals that’s the player I am, I was lucky enough Deano came on board and I had a relationship with him before. I’m really grateful to still be at the club".

=== 2018 ===
On 2 May 2018, Lichaa was dropped by new Canterbury coach Dean Pay after struggling for form. On May 6, 2018, Lichaa spoke to the media about being dropped saying “You find out who your really good mates are in these tough times, you look at your phone and you see 30 or 40 messages from people, and you know the guys that are there for you at the end of the day, no matter what, and through thick and thin", “You learn a lot about yourself and who your true friends and family are".

=== 2019 ===
Lichaa made 13 appearances for Canterbury-Bankstown in the 2019 NRL season as the club finished 12th on the table. On September 16, it was announced that Lichaa would be released by the club after failing to secure a contract for the 2020 season.

=== 2020 ===
For the 2020 season, Lichaa signed with the small club of Cronulla-Caringbah Sharks in the Sydney Shield.

On 27 September, Lichaa played for Cronulla-Caringbah in the 2020 Sydney Shield grand final where they defeated Ryde-Eastwood Hawks 32-30 at Bankwest Stadium.

== Domestic violence and sex scandal ==
On 15 February 2021, it was reported that Lichaa had been charged with domestic violence offences against his fiancée. He was taken to hospital with serious arm injuries after allegedly being involved in an altercation with his fiancée and with former Canterbury-Bankstown player, best friend, and former teammate Adam Elliott. The court heard that the incident occurred after Mr Lichaa caught Ms Childerhouse performing oral sex on Elliott. Lichaa was acquitted in August 2022 after an 18-month legal case, as his fiancée declined to press charges, pleading guilty to the less-serious charge of property damage for the broken window.

"I couldn’t get the image of my fiancee performing oral sex on my best friend out of my mind," Lichaa told the court. Lichaa lost 2.5 litres of blood after punching a window with his hand, with police describing the scene as a "bloodfest". Concerned neighbours, who reported hearing a man scream "I’m going to fucking kill her", called triple zero.
