= Daniel Abou Sleiman =

Lebanon international rugby league footballer

Daniel Sleiman
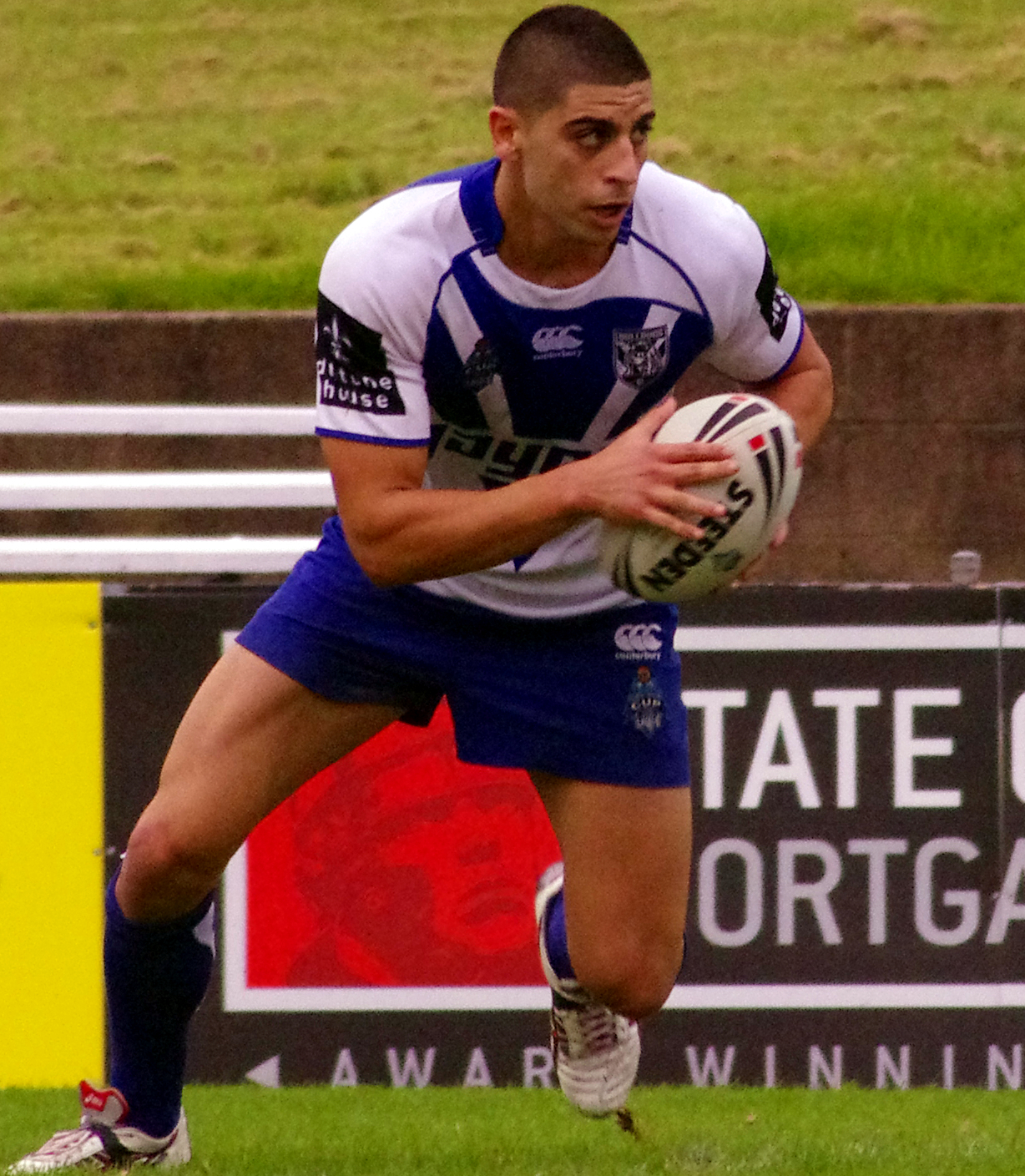

Personal information
- Full name: Daniel Abou Sleiman
- Born: 19 November 1991 (age 35)

Playing information
- Position: Fullback, Wing
Representative
Years	Team	Pld	T	G	FG	P
2012–17	Lebanon	3	2	0	0	8
- Source: As of 8 September 2016

Daniel Abou Sleiman is a Lebanese international rugby footballer who plays as a full-back or on the wing.

Abou Sleiman is a Lebanese rugby league international. Abou-Sleiman has played first grade rugby union in Japan. He has previously played for Cabramatta Two Blues and the Wests Tigers in the NSW Cup.
