= Jaleel Seve-Derbas =

Lebanon international rugby league footballer

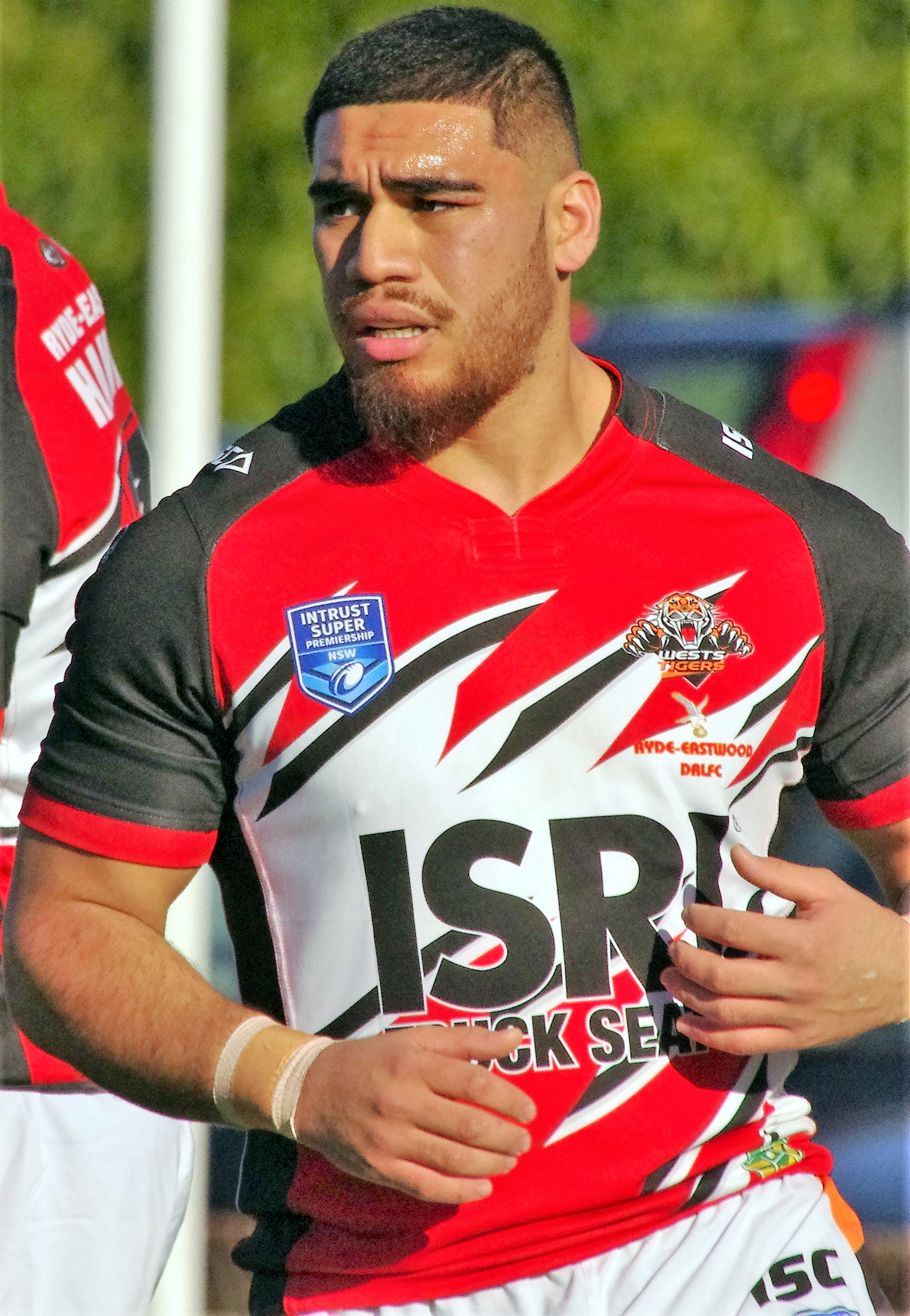

Personal information
- Born: 11 February 1996 (age 30)
- Height: 183 cm (6 ft 0 in)
- Weight: 104 kg (16 st 5 lb)

Playing information
- Position: Second-row, Centre
Club
Years	Team	Pld	T	G	FG	P
	Wests Tigers
Representative
Years	Team	Pld	T	G	FG	P
2017–	Lebanon	1	0	0	0	0
- Source: As of 29 October 2017

Jaleel Seve-Derbas is a Lebanon international rugby league footballer who plays for the Wests Tigers in the National Rugby League. His position is at second-row. He was selected to represent Lebanon in the 2017 Rugby League World Cup.

== Early career and personal life ==
He played his junior rugby league for Cabramatta Two Blues. He is studying a Bachelor of Business at the University of Technology Sydney.
