= Benjamin Jullien =

France international rugby league footballer

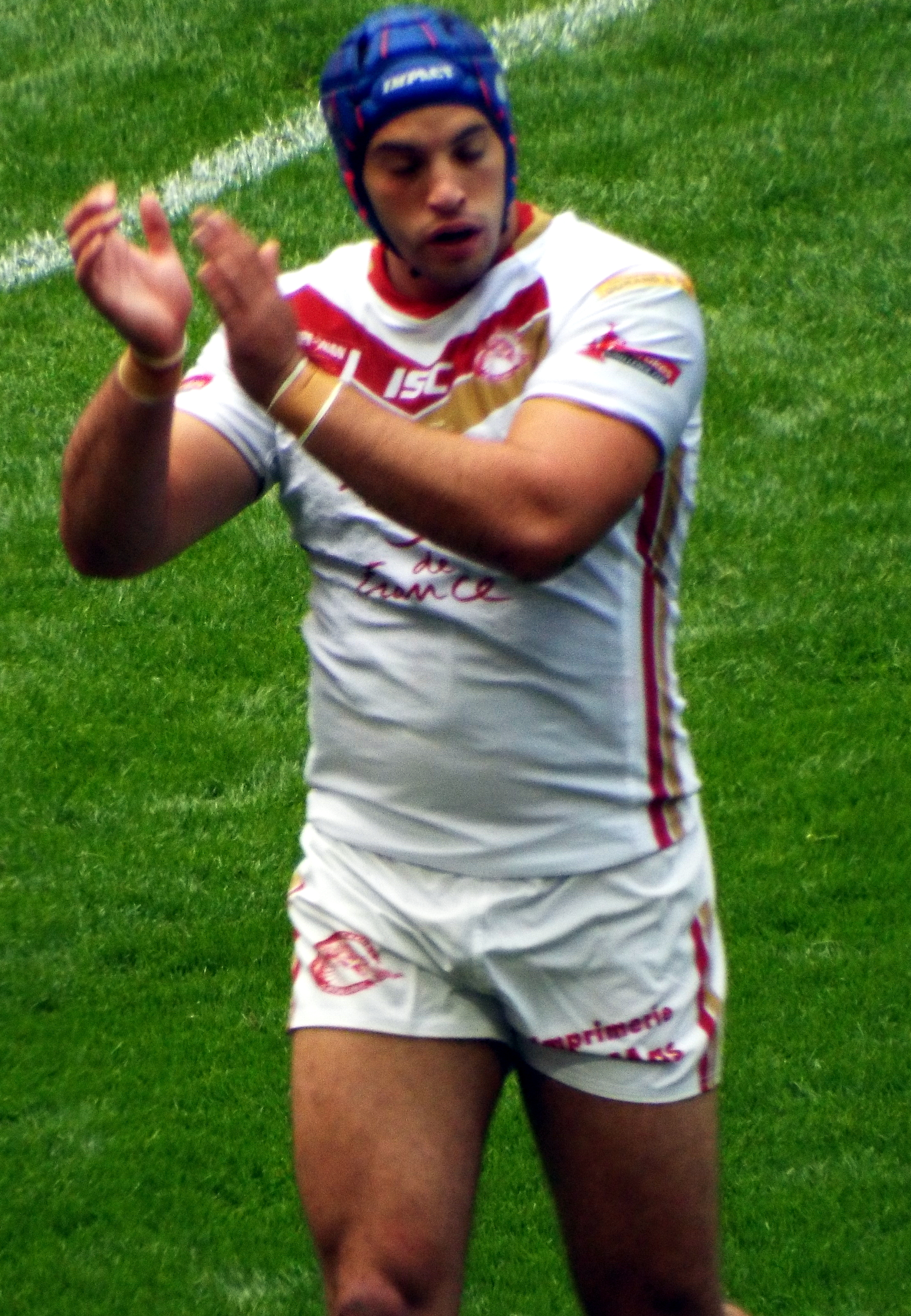

Personal information
- Born: 1 March 1995 (age 30); Avignon, Vaucluse, Provence-Alpes-Côte d'Azur, France
- Height: 6 ft 1 in (1.85 m)
- Weight: 16 st 1 lb (102 kg)

Playing information
- Position: Second-row, Centre
Club
Years	Team	Pld	T	G	FG	P
2012–15	SO Avignon	30	14	0	0	56
2015	North Wales Crusaders	14	7	0	0	28
2016–17	Warrington Wolves	36	6	0	0	24
2016(loan)	→ Rochdale Hornets	4	4	0	0	16
2017(loan)	→ Rochdale Hornets	1	1	0	0	4
2018–22	Catalans Dragons	88	16	0	0	64
2023–	Pia	1	0	0	0	0
	Total	174	48	0	0	192
Representative
Years	Team	Pld	T	G	FG	P
2015–	France	19	5	0	0	20
- Source: As of 30 October 2022

Benjamin Jullien (born 1 March 1995) is a French rugby league footballer who plays as a second-row for the Baroudeurs de Pia XIII in the Elite One Championship and France at international level.

He previously played for SO Avignon in the Elite One Championship, North Wales Crusaders in League 1 and the Warrington Wolves in the Super League. He has also spent time on loan from Warrington at the Rochdale Hornets in Kingstone Press League 1 and the Championship.

== Background ==
Julien was born in Avignon, Provence-Alpes-Côte d'Azur, France.

== Club career ==
=== Early career ===
Jullien began his career in the juniors at Sporting Olympique Avignon. He spent some time as a young player in Australia with Brisbane Broncos. In 2015, Jullien joined the North Wales Crusaders, playing 14 matches in League 1 and scoring 7 tries.

=== Warrington Wolves ===
Jullien joined Warrington Wolves ahead of the 2016 Super League season, making his Super League debut from the bench in the round one victory over the Leeds Rhinos. He scored his first Super League try in a victory over the Wigan Warriors on April 28.

=== Catalans Dragons ===
He played in the 2018 Challenge Cup Final victory over the Warrington Wolves at Wembley Stadium.

== International career ==
Jullien was a member of the France squad for the 2014 European Cup, but did not feature. He made his France début the following year in a victory over Serbia. He also participated for France in the 2015 European Cup where he played all 3 matches as well as in a test match against England. The following year he made another appearance for France in their end of year test match against England in Avignon. In the 2017 World Cup he played in all three games for France. In the opening game of the 2021 Rugby League World Cup group stage, Jullien scored two tries for France in a 34-12 victory over Greece.
