= Mickaël Rouch =

France international rugby league footballer

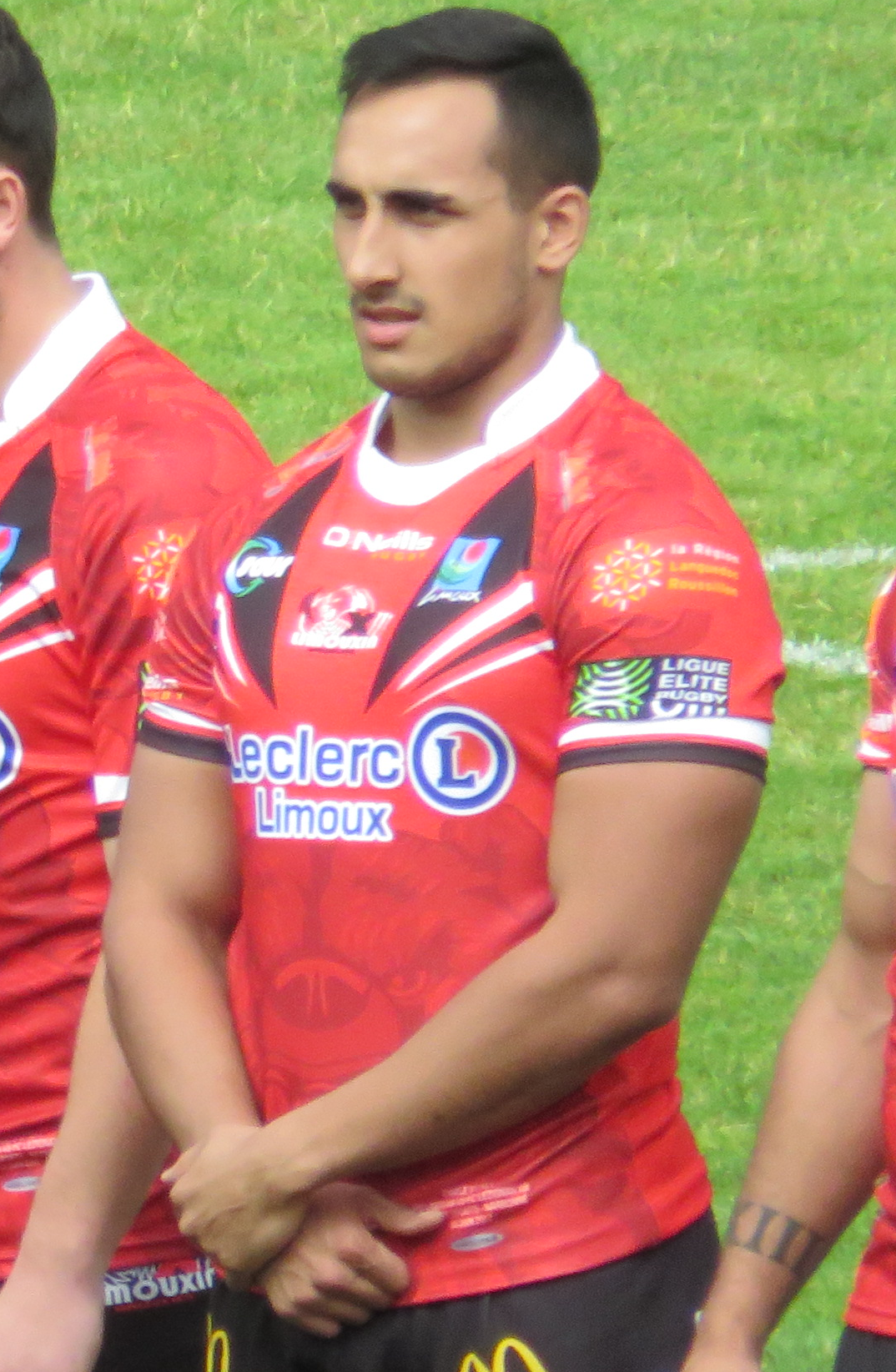

Personal information
- Born: 20 January 1993 (age 32); France

Playing information
- Position: Loose forward
Club
Years	Team	Pld	T	G	FG	P
2010–12	Limoux Grizzlies	14	3	0	0	12
2012–14	Saint-Esteve	24	0	0	0	0
2014–	Limoux Grizzlies	86	25	0	0	100
	Total	124	28	0	0	112
Representative
Years	Team	Pld	T	G	FG	P
2017	France	2	0	0	0	0
- Source: As of 29 June 2019

Mickaël Rouch is a French rugby league footballer who represented France national rugby league team in the 2017 World Cup.

Rouch began his career at Limoux Grizzlies, having a spell with Saint-Esteve XIII Catalan before returning to Limoux. He was selected as part of the France squad for the 2017 Rugby League World Cup and made his French debut against Australia on 3 November 2017.
