= Jason Wehbe =

Lebanese international rugby footballer

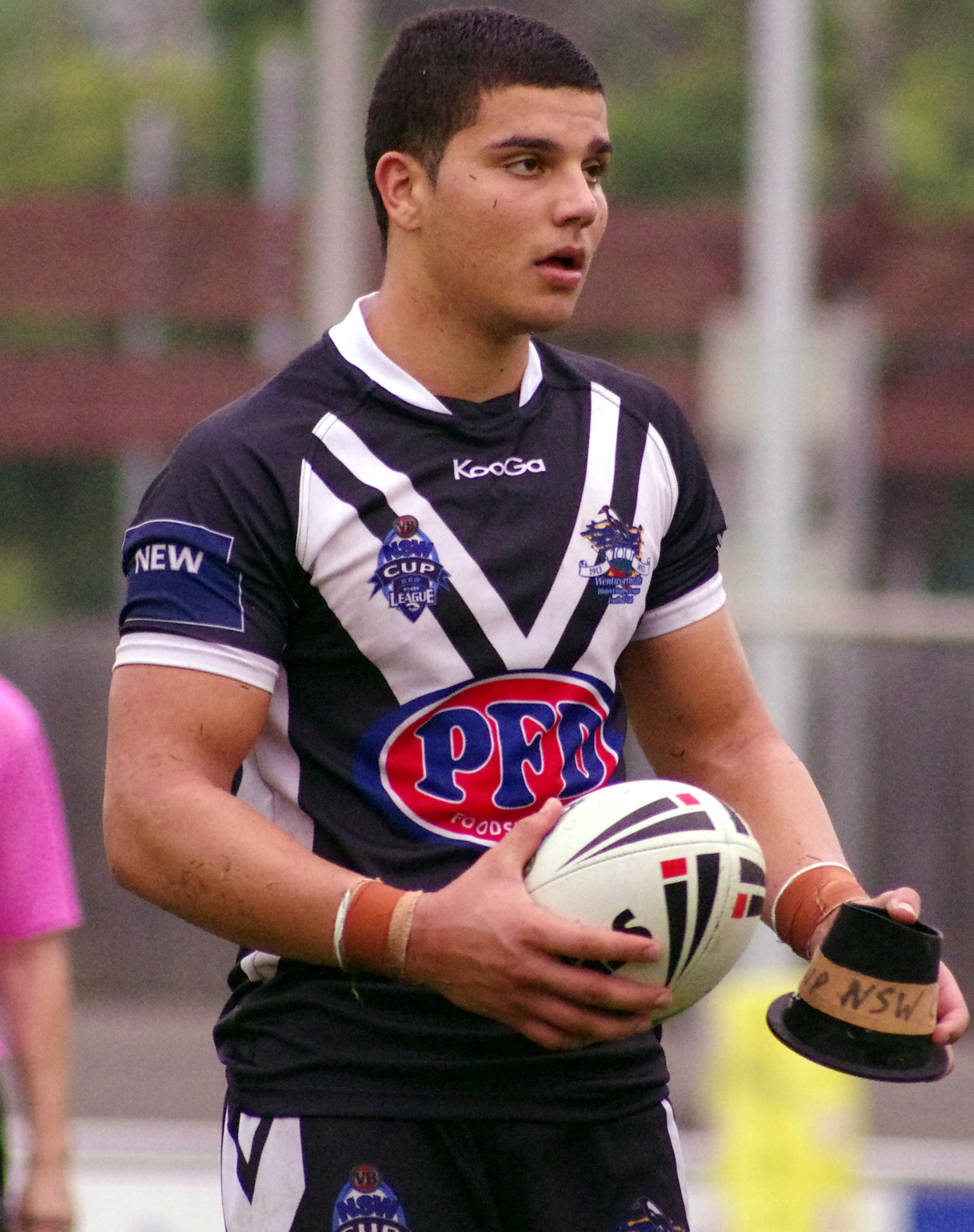

Personal information
- Born: 16 August 1992 (age 34)
- Height: 187 cm (6 ft 2 in)
- Weight: 100 kg (220 lb; 15 st 10 lb)

Playing information

Rugby union
- Position: Flanker
Club
Years	Team	Pld	T	G	FG	P
2014–2016	Panasonic Wild Knights	14	2	0	0	10

Rugby league
- Position: Loose forward, Five-eighth, Centre
Representative
Years	Team	Pld	T	G	FG	P
2016–2017	Lebanon	5	1	0	0

Jason Wehbe is a Lebanese international rugby footballer who most recently played rugby league for the Hills District Bulls. He plays as a five-eighth and centre. He was selected to represent Lebanon in the 2017 Rugby League World Cup.

== Rugby league career ==
Wehbe played for the Parramatta Eels in the NRL Under 20s competition, playing alongside Junior Paulo and Semi Radradra. Wehbe made 41 appearances for Parramatta between 2010 and 2012 in the NYC.

Wehbe made his international debut for Lebanon in 2016 against Cook Islands, losing 20–30. Wehbe was subsequently picked for Lebanon in the 2017 Rugby League World Cup, featuring in all three group stage matches and the quarter final 22–24 loss to Tonga at Rugby League Park in Christchurch. He also scored a try in the 10–29 loss to England at Sydney Football Stadium.

== Rugby union career ==
Wehbe played rugby union for Panasonic Wild Knights in Japan's Top League.
