= Andrew Kazzi =

Lebanon international rugby league footballer

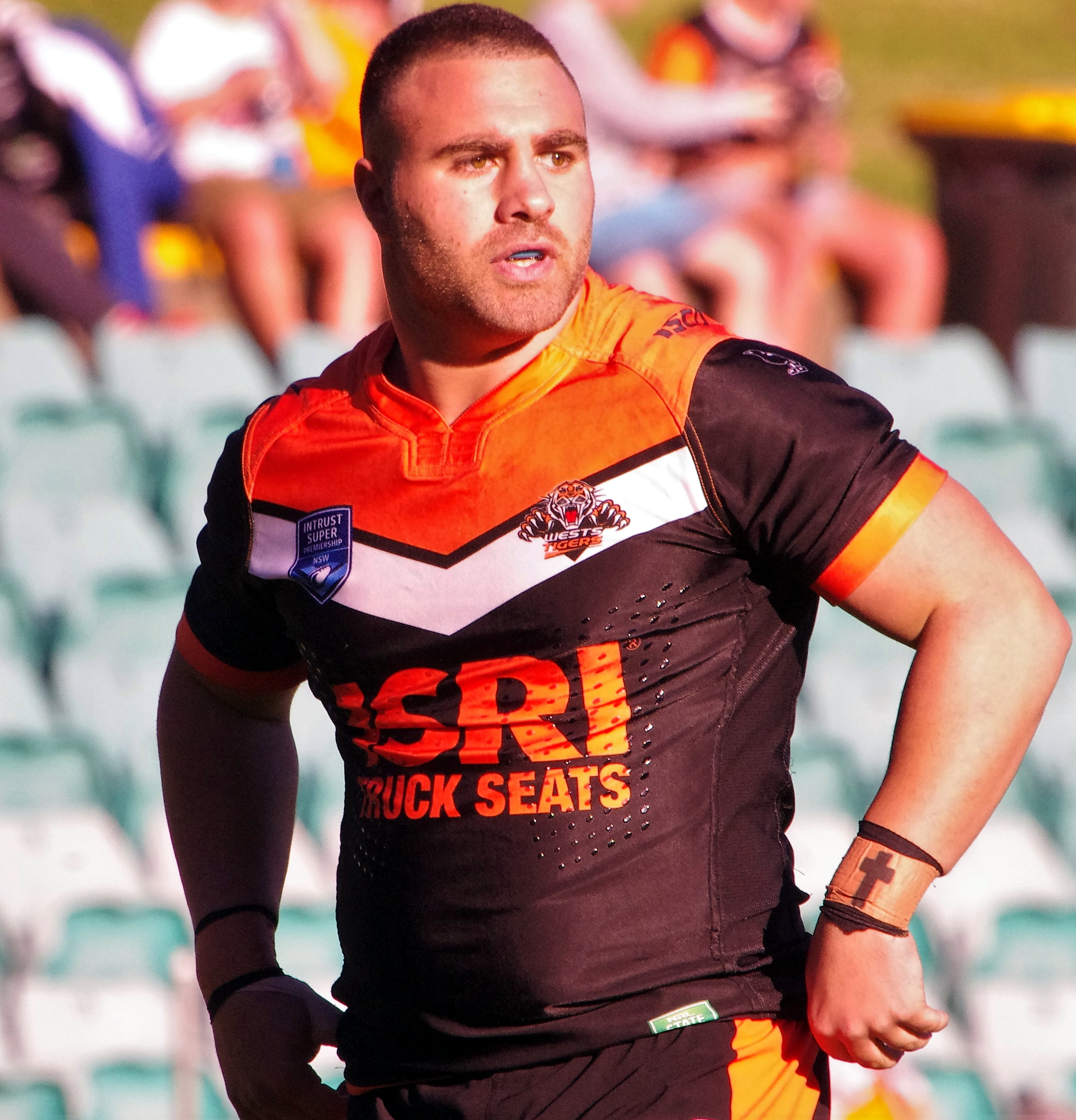

Personal information
- Born: Australia,

Playing information
- Position: Second-row
Representative
Years	Team	Pld	T	G	FG	P
2012–	Lebanon	8	1	0	0	4
- Source: As of 4 November 2022

Andrew Kazzi is a Lebanon international rugby league footballer who was contracted to the Wests Tigers. He played as second-row.

He was selected to represent Lebanon in the 2017 Rugby League World Cup.
