= Maxime Hérold =

France international rugby league footballer

Maxime Herold
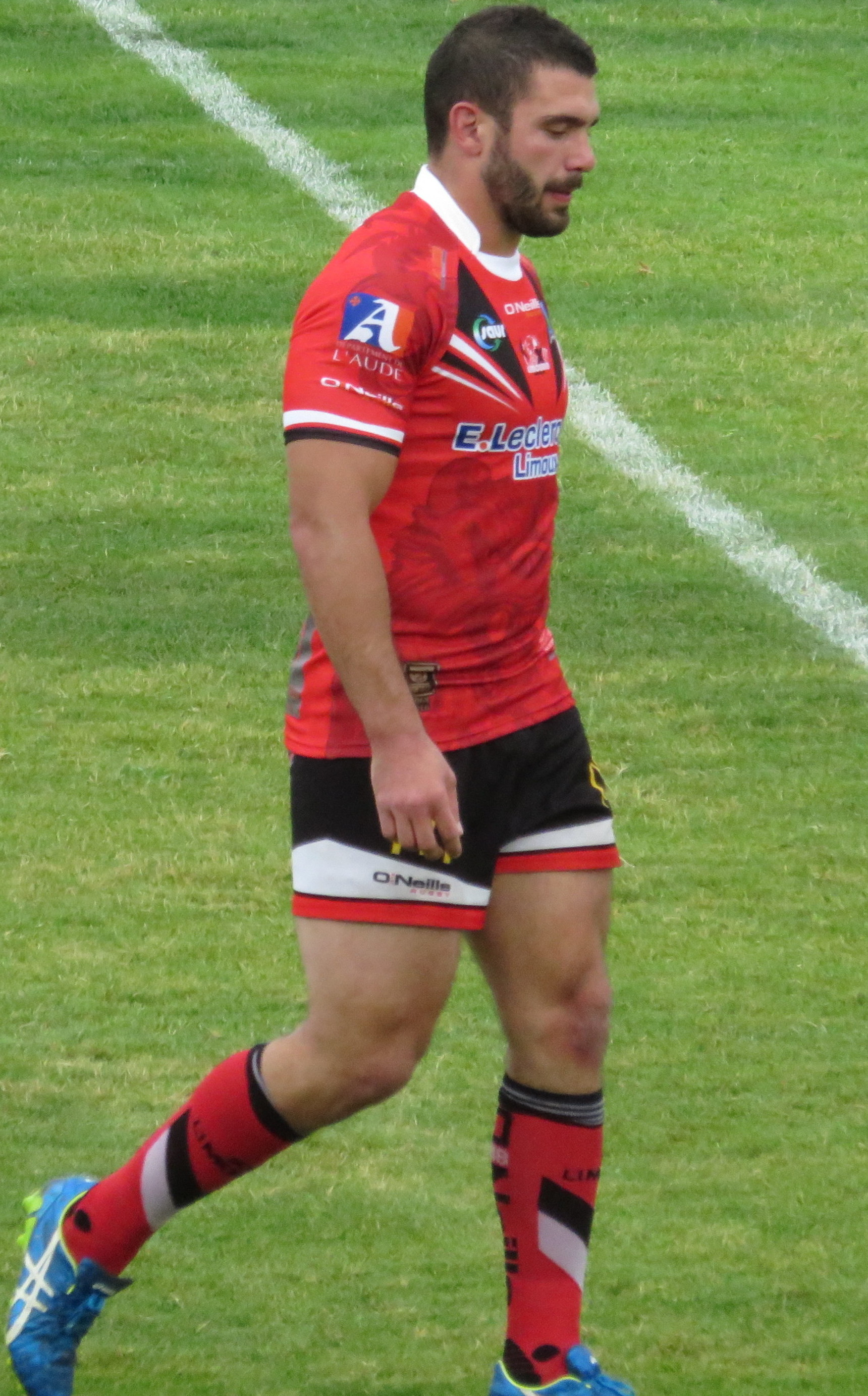

Personal information
- Full name: Maxime Hérold
- Born: 9 September 1989 (age 36) France
- Height: 6 ft 0 in (1.84 m)
- Weight: 14 st 7 lb (92 kg)

Playing information
- Position: Prop, Loose forward, Second-row
Club
Years	Team	Pld	T	G	FG	P
2007–14	Limoux Grizzlies	113	11	0	0	44
2014	London Broncos	2	0	0	0	0
2014–	Limoux Grizzlies	52	16	0	0	64
	Total	167	27	0	0	108
Representative
Years	Team	Pld	T	G	FG	P
2015–17	France	3	1	0	0	4
- Source: As of 10 February 2018

Maxime Hérold (born 9 September 1989) is a French professional rugby league footballer who plays as a prop, second-row or loose forward for the Limoux Grizzlies in the Elite One Championship. He is a France international.

== Playing career ==
In 2014 he signed for the London Broncos in the Super League, after an initial four-week trial.

In 2014 Hérold returned to France and re-joined Limoux Grizzlies in the Elite Championship.

He made his France début in 2015 against Serbia.
