= Ilias Bergal =

France international rugby league footballer

Personal information
- Born: 6 April 1996 (age 30) Perpignan, Pyrénées-Orientales, Occitania, France
- Height: 6 ft 2 in (187 cm)
- Weight: 13 st 10 lb (87 kg)

Playing information
- Position: Wing
Club
Years	Team	Pld	T	G	FG	P
2015–17	Saint-Esteve	32	34	0	0	136
2017–17	Swinton Lions	6	5	0	0	20
2018	Leigh Centurions	11	13	0	0	52
2018(loan)	→ Swinton Lions	4	0	0	0	0
2018(loan)	→ Workington Town	2	3	0	0	12
2019–	Toulouse Olympique	9	14	0	0	56
	Total	64	69	0	0	276
Representative
Years	Team	Pld	T	G	FG	P
2017–	France	3	0	0	0	0
- Source: As of 17 November 2018

Ilias Bergal (born 6 April 1996) is a French rugby league footballer who plays for Baroudeurs de Pia XIII as a winger in the Super XIII. He previously played for Toulouse Olympique, Leigh Centurions and the Swinton Lions.

== Background ==
Bergal was born in Perpignan, France.

== Club career ==
Bergal began his career in the junior teams of the Catalans Dragons, where he represented France at junior level and was a prolific try scorer for the club's reserve team. In 2017, Bergal joined the Swinton Lions on a short-term contract.

In October 2017, Bergal signed for the Leigh Centurions on a two-year contract.

== International career ==
Bergal was named as a standby player for France's squad at the 2017 Rugby League World Cup. He was called into the main squad prior to the tournament when Hakim Miloudi was dropped for a breach of team discipline.
