= John Boudebza =

France international rugby league footballer

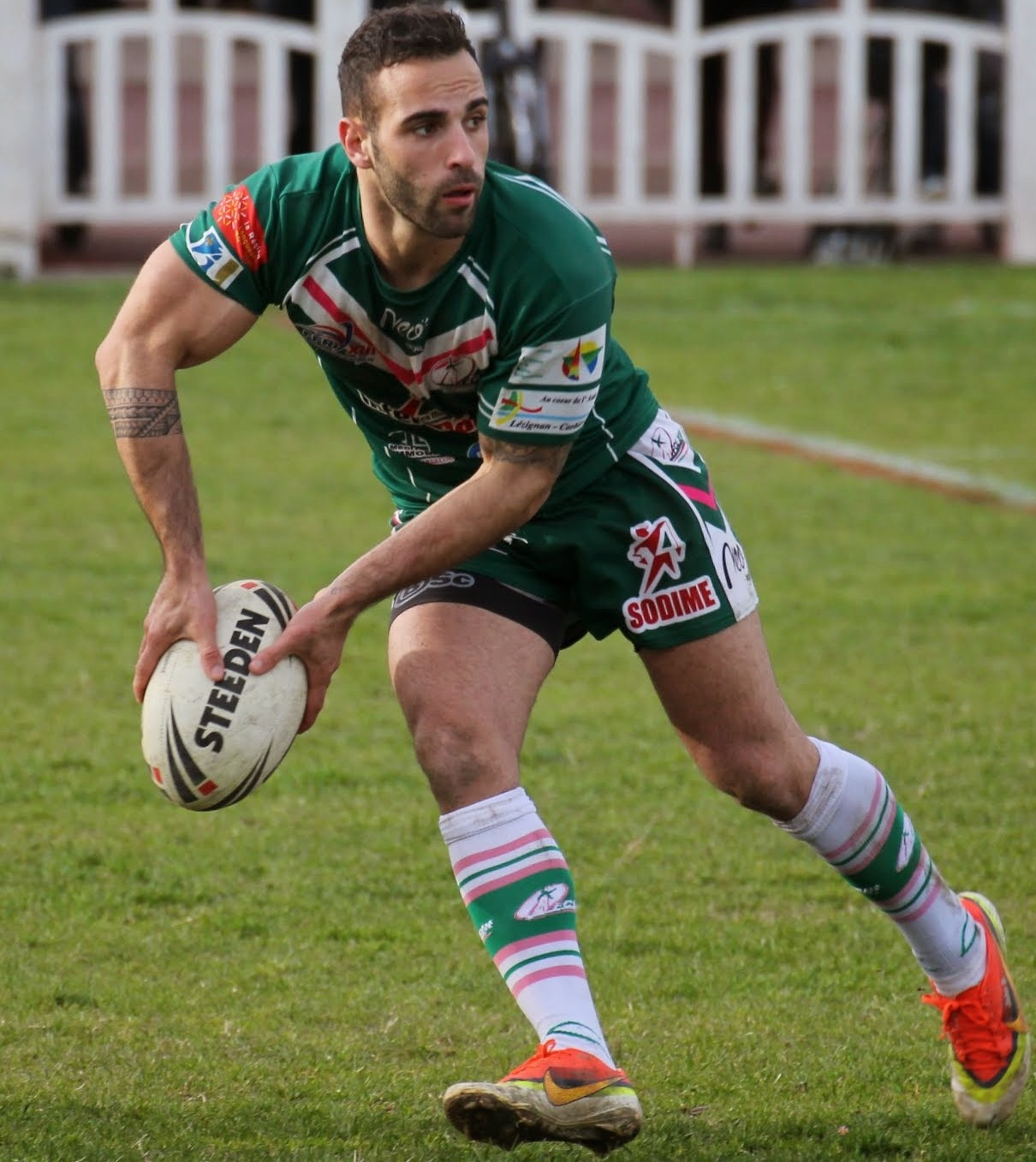

Personal information
- Born: 13 June 1990 (age 36) Perpignan, Pyrénées-Orientales, Occitania, France
- Height: 5 ft 8 in (172 cm)
- Weight: 11 st 11 lb (75 kg)

Playing information
- Position: Hooker
Club
Years	Team	Pld	T	G	FG	P
2008–09	Saint-Esteve	15	2	5	0	18
2009–12	SM Pia XIII	60	7	0	0	28
2012–14	Lézignan Sangliers	37	6	0	0	24
2015–16	Hull Kingston Rovers	42	3	0	0	12
2016–17	Lézignan Sangliers	6	1	0	0	4
2017	London Broncos	5	0	0	0	0
2017–18	Lézignan Sangliers	12	3	0	1	13
2018–	Palau Broncos	17	4	0	0	16
	Total	194	26	5	1	115
Representative
Years	Team	Pld	T	G	FG	P
2014–17	France	9	0	0	1	1
- Source: As of 29 June 2019
- Father: Hadj Boudebza

John Boudebza (born 6 June 1990) is a French professional rugby league footballer who plays for Palau Broncos and previously Lézignan Sangliers in the Elite One Championship, London Broncos in the Kingstone Press Championship and Hull Kingston Rovers in the Super League and at international level for France. His position is hooker.

== Club career ==
=== Early career ===
Boudebza played in the Elite One Championship for SM Pia XIII and Lézignan Sangliers. His father, Hadj Boudebza is a former rugby league player who played for Paris Saint-Germain, AS Saint-Estève and for France, disputing the 1995 Rugby League World Cup.

=== Hull KR ===
Boudebza joined Hull Kingston Rovers on a one-year deal prior to the 2015 Super League season. He appeared in the 2015 Challenge Cup Final for Hull KR. Boudebza left Hull KR following their relegation from Super League in 2016.

=== FC Lézignan XIII ===
On 30 Nov 2016 it was reported that he had signed for FC Lézignan XIII in the Elite One Championship

=== London Broncos ===
After taking time off to heal long-standing injuries following his departure from Hull KR, Boudebza joined the London Broncos in July 2017.

== International career ==
Boudebza made his international début for France in a victory over Wales in the 2014 European Cup. He scored his first international point with a field goal against Ireland in the 2015 European Cup competition. He also played for France in their 2015 European Cup mid-tournament test-match against England. He was a part what was considered a 'weakened' French side due to injury and it showed with an appalling showing against their opponents.
