= Tim Mannah =

Lebanon international rugby league footballer

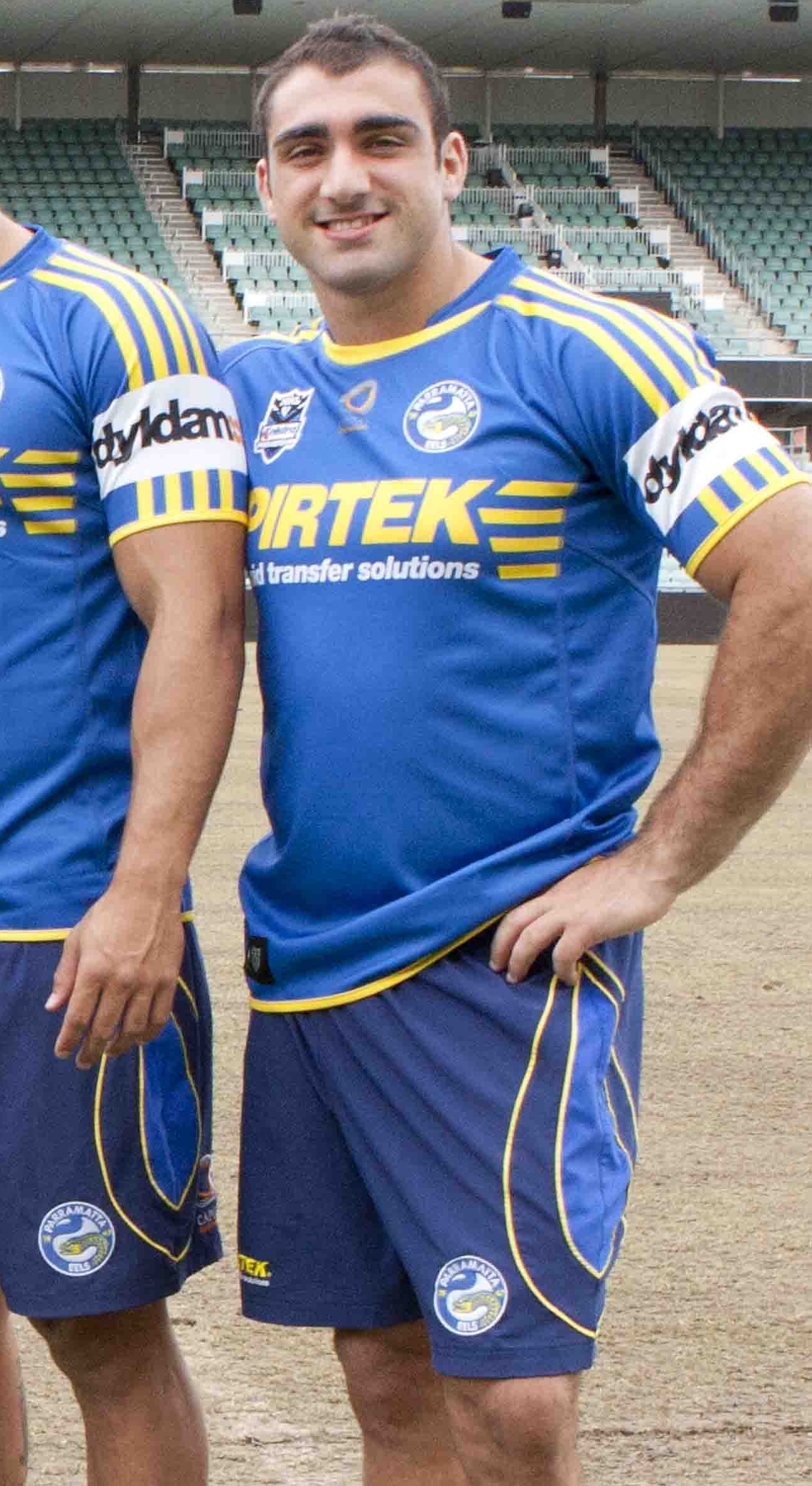

Personal information
- Full name: Timothy Mannah
- Born: 15 February 1988 (age 38) Sydney, New South Wales, Australia

Playing information
- Height: 184 cm (6 ft 0 in)
- Weight: 110 kg (17 st 5 lb)
- Position: Prop
Club
| Years | Team | Pld | T | G | FG | P |
|---|---|---|---|---|---|---|
| 2009–19 | Parramatta Eels | 233 | 6 | 0 | 0 | 24 |
Representative
| Years | Team | Pld | T | G | FG | P |
| 2010–13 | City NSW | 4 | 0 | 0 | 0 | 0 |
| 2010–11 | New South Wales | 4 | 0 | 0 | 0 | 0 |
| 2012 | Prime Minister's XIII | 1 | 0 | 0 | 0 | 0 |
| 2017–19 | Lebanon | 5 | 0 | 0 | 0 | 0 |
- Relatives: Jon Mannah (brother)

Tim Mannah (born 15 February 1988) is a former Lebanon international rugby league footballer who played as a prop for the Parramatta Eels in the NRL.

He played for City NSW, New South Wales in the State of Origin series and the Prime Minister's XIII. Mannah played his entire NRL career with Parramatta, attaining the club's captaincy in the process and scoring a hatrick once.

== Background ==
Mannah was born in Sydney, Australia. He is of Lebanese descent.

== Playing career ==
In round 1 of the 2009 NRL season, Mannah made his NRL premiership debut for Parramatta Eels against the New Zealand Warriors at Mt Smart Stadium. His brother, Jon Mannah, played for the Sharks between 2009 and 2011. Mannah came to be regarded by many as a potential future leader of the Parramatta side Mannah played in The 2009 NRL grand final loss against Melbourne coming off the interchange bench.

In 2010, Mannah played for both the City team and the New South Wales State of Origin team as a substitute. In 2011, Mannah played again for City and all three State of Origin games for New South Wales. In the final two games of the series Mannah started both and was actually one of only 2 prop forwards playing for New South Wales after coach, Ricky Stuart opted for a faster, more mobile pack and played second-rowers in the prop forward position. At the end of the 2011 season, Mannah was selected by Julia Gillard to join the Prime Minister's XIII for their annual clash with the PNG Kumuls.

For the 2013 and 2014 NRL seasons, Mannah co-captained the NRL side along with fullback Jarryd Hayne. After Hayne defected to the NFL, he became the stand-alone captain in 2015.

At the end of the 2016 season, Mannah re-signed with the Parramatta Eels, keeping him at the club until the end of 2019. On 11 August 2017, Mannah made his 200th NRL appearance against Newcastle. In The 2018 season, Mannah was moved to the interchange bench by coach Brad Arthur after a horror start where Parramatta lost their opening six games. In Round 9 against Cronulla, Mannah suffered a fractured eye socket and was ruled out for 3–4 weeks. Mannah returned to the Parramatta side for their Round 14 victory over North Queensland. At the end of the 2018 season, Mannah made 18 appearances for Parramatta and scored 1 try as the club endured a horrid season on and off the field claiming its 14th wooden spoon and Mannah's third wooden spoon since beginning his first grade career with The Eels in 2009.

For the start of the 2019 NRL season, Mannah was selected to play from the bench by coach Brad Arthur. In Round 6 2019, Mannah played from the bench as Parramatta defeated Wests Tigers 51–6 in the opening NRL game to be played at the new Western Sydney Stadium. In Round 9 2019, Mannah played from the bench as Parramatta suffered their third worst loss since coming into the competition in 1947, losing to Melbourne 64–10 at Suncorp Stadium.

On 28 May 2019, Mannah was demoted to reserve grade by coach Brad Arthur after the club had suffered 3 disappointing losses in a row, culminating in a 16–10 loss against last placed Penrith.

In June 2019, it was revealed that Mannah was on the verge of signing with the Wests Tigers for the remainder of the 2019 NRL season but the deal never materialised. On 2 September 2019, it was revealed that Mannah would be leaving Parramatta after 11 years at the club.

For the remainder of the 2019 season, Mannah played for Parramatta's feeder club the Wentworthville Magpies in the Canterbury Cup NSW. Mannah played in Wentworthville's amazing run to the grand final as they reached the decider after finishing 8th on the table. Mannah's final game as a player came in the final against Newtown which Wentworthville lost 20–15 after extra-time at the Western Sydney Stadium.

On 29 September 2019, Mannah was named in the 2019 Canterbury Cup NSW team of the season.

== Post playing ==
After retiring from the NRL, Mannah stayed with the Eels in a behind the scenes role in the clubs media section. On 8 August 2023, Mannah received a life membership from the club. On 14 January 2025, the Eels announced that Mannah was named as one of the clubs Foundation Ambassadors.

== Statistics ==
| Year | Team | Games | Tries | Pts |
|---|---|---|---|---|
| 2009 | Parramatta Eels | 28 | 1 | 4 |
| 2010 | Parramatta Eels | 23 | | |
| 2011 | Parramatta Eels | 22 | | |
| 2012 | Parramatta Eels | 24 | 1 | 4 |
| 2013 | Parramatta Eels | 24 | | |
| 2014 | Parramatta Eels | 22 | | |
| 2015 | Parramatta Eels | 23 | 2 | 8 |
| 2016 | Parramatta Eels | 14 | | |
| 2017 | Parramatta Eels | 25 | 1 | 4 |
| 2018 | Parramatta Eels | 18 | 1 | 4 |
| 2019 | Parramatta Eels | 10 | | |
| | Totals | 233 | 6 | 24 |

== See also ==
Jon Mannah - Tim's deceased younger brother, for whom the Johnny Mannah Cup is named. The Eels team that Tim was a part of successfully won the cup named for his brother three times: in 2013, 2014, and 2019.
