= International rugby league in 2017 =

A list of men and women international rugby league matches played throughout 2017 and does not include wheelchair rugby league international matches. A † denotes a recognised, but unofficial match that did not contribute to the IRL World Rankings.

The season included the 2017 Rugby League World Cup which will be held in Australia, New Zealand and Papua New Guinea during October, November and December.

== February ==
=== Hungary vs Uruguay ===
4 February 2017
17:30 AEDT (UTC+11)

Hungary	50 – 4	Uruguay
Tries: N. Farkas (2), Varga (2), Acsai, A. Farkas, D. Farkas, Institoris, R. Németh; Goals: A. Farkas (6/7), J. Farkas (0/1), S. Németh (0/1)		Tries: N. Cama; Goals: ? (0/1)

Hillier Oval, Sydney

Team details

FB	1	Nathan Farkas
WG	2	Marty Schneider
CE	11	Chris Schneider
CE	4	Stephen Németh
WG	5	Ryan Németh
FE	6	Jared Farkas
HB	7	David Farkas (c)
PR	8	Joseph Tóth
HK	19	Aaron Farkas
PR	10	Károly Acsai
SR	15	Josh Institoris
SR	12	Brent Varga
LK	13	Eddie Ertl
Interchange:
BE	3	Daniel Bridges
BE	14	Max Feast
BE	16	Matthew Pankasz
BE	17	Shane Stevens
Coach:
Jonathan Wilson

FB	Matt Cama
WG	Michael Leon
CE	Matthew Booth
CE	Angel Morrison
WG	Javier Britos
FE	Gabriel Papa
HB	Jesse Graham
PR	Michael Pizzorno
HK	Nicholas Cama
PR	Eric Rendo
SR	Andres Rossini
SR	Julio Toledo
LK	Josh Gadea Hellyer
Interchange:
BE	Pablo Florentin
BE	Federico Gonzales
BE	Steven Clarke
BE	Michael Byng-Bolz
Coach:
Mark de Ubago

Notes:

- This was Uruguay's first ever RLIF-sanctioned Test match.
- This was Hungary's first ever Test match win.
- Hungary's Max Feast made his Test debut aged just 16 years and 23 days.

=== Thailand vs El Salvador ===
4 February 2017
19:00 AEDT (UTC+11)

Thailand	32 – 12	El Salvador
Tries: Choengkhiri (2), Stapleton (2), Boonkhit, Chimpla, Halpin; Goals: Twigg (2)		Tries: A. Alarcon (2); Goals: M. Gonzalez (2)

Hillier Oval, Sydney
Referee: Ben McMurray (Australia)

Notes:

- This was Thailand's first ever RLIF-sanctioned Test match.

=== Philippines vs Malta ===
4 February 2017
16:30 AEDT (UTC+11)

Philippines	26 – 44	Malta
Tries: Goodwin (3), Stephenson (2); Goals: Wiggins (3/5)		Tries: Cauchi (4), Attard, Benson, Bradford, Grech; Goals: Benson (6/7), Weston (0/1)

New Era Stadium, Sydney
Attendance: ≈1,400
Referee: Michael Smaill (Australia)

Team details

FB	1	Steve Tolo
WG	2	Richie Goodwin
CE	3	Ned Stephenson
CE	4	Dennis Gordon
WG	5	John Nicodemus
FE	6	Kieran Wiggins
HB	7	James Marcus
PR	8	Ellis Jensen
HK	9	Luke Srama (c)
PR	10	Glenn Power
SR	11	Will Grooms
SR	12	Ricky Kucia
LK	13	Rez Phillips (c)
Interchange:
BE	14	Ryan Clarke
BE	15	Dylan Jones
BE	16	Rupert Zappia
BE	17	Gerard Tulud
Coach:
Arwin Marcus

FB	1	Joel Bradford
WG	2	Jake Webster
CE	3	Nathan Falzon
CE	22	Aaron Weston
WG	5	Nathan Benson
FE	6	Luke Cauchi
HB	7	James Redman
PR	8	Dean Zammit
HK	9	Jake Attard (c)
PR	10	Jake Lennox
SR	11	Jake Grace
SR	12	Kyal Greene
LK	13	Aaron Grech
Interchange:
BE	14	Matt Thompson
BE	15	Jonathan Trott
BE	16	Ben Stone
BE	17	Christopher Rapinette
Coach:
Peter Cassar

=== Hungary vs Thailand ===
8 February 2017
20:15 AEDT (UTC+11)

Hungary	44 – 10	Thailand
Tries: McKewin (2), Acsai, A. Farkas, D. Farkas, J. Farkas, Institoris, Varga; Goals: A. Farkas (4/5), D. Farkas (2/2), J. Farkas (0/1)		Tries: Choengkhiri, Waugh; Goals: Twigg (1/2)

Endeavour Sports High School, Sydney
Attendance: ≈200
Referee: Dean Tyler (Australia)

Team details

FB	1	Nathan Farkas
WG	2	Marty Schneider
CE	3	Paul Graham
CE	4	Brent Varga
WG	5	Ryan Németh
FE	6	Jared Farkas
HB	7	David Farkas (c)
PR	8	Joseph Tóth
HK	19	Aaron Farkas
PR	10	Károly Acsai
SR	11	Josh Institoris
SR	12	Paul Ivan
LK	15	Paul McKewin
Interchange:
BE	14	Daniel Bridges
BE	16	Shane Stevens
BE	17	Stephen Tóth
BE	20	Matthew Pankasz
Coach:
Jonathan Wilson

FB	1	Wongsatorn Suthamwuthinant
WG	2	Micky Pannao
CE	3	Dangmo Chimpla
CE	4	Matthew Waugh
WG	19	Suhttirak Choengkhiri
FE	6	Chris Twigg
HB	7	Michael O'Brien
PR	8	Will Scully
HK	9	Eightt Saisiri
PR	10	Carlin Millar (c)
SR	11	Joseph Halpin
SR	13	Scott Stapleton
LK	14	Rhys Tucker
Interchange:
BE	12	Don Boonkhit
BE	15	Damien Nicholls
BE	16	Vissut Domklang
BE	20	Curtis Baxter
Coach:
Brian Smith

== May ==
=== ANZAC Test ===
==== Women's ====
5 May 2017

Australia	16 – 4	New Zealand
Tries: Kelly (10') 1 Temara (29') 1 Kunst (51') 1 Goals: Moran 2/3 (11', 30')		Tries: Tupaea (25') 1 Goals: Laura Mariu 0/1

Canberra Stadium, Canberra

Team details

FB	2	Karina Brown]
WG	19	Isabelle Kelly
CE	3	Corban McGregor
CE	4	Caitlin Moran
WG	5	Chelsea Baker
FE	6	Zahara Temara
HB	7	Simone Smith
PR	8	Ruan Sims
HK	9	Brittany Breayley
PR	10	Heather Ballinger
SR	11	Renae Kunst
SR	12	Annette Brander
LK	13	Simaima Taufa
Interchange:
IN	14	Ali Brigginshaw
IN	15	Rebecca Young
IN	16	Elianna Walton
IN	18	Maddie Studdon
Coach: Brad Donald

FB	1	Sarina Fiso
WG	2	Langi Veainu
CE	3	Corrina Whiley
CE	4	Va'anessa Molia-Fraser
WG	5	Atawhai Tupaea
FE	6	Georgia Hale
HB	7	Alexandra Cook
PR	8	Lilieta Maumau
HK	9	Krystal Rota
PR	10	Bunty Kuruwaka-Crowe
SR	11	Crystal Tamarua
SR	12	Teuila Fotu-Moala]
LK	13	Laura Mariu
Interchange:
IN	14	Annetta Nu'uausala
IN	15	Hilda Peters
IN	16	Ngatokotoru Arakua
IN	17	Nora Maaka
Coach: Tony Benson

==== Men's ====
5 May 2017
20:05 AEST (UTC+10)

Australia	30 – 12	New Zealand
Tries: Chambers, Dugan, Ferguson, Frizell, Trbojevic; Goals: Thurston (5/5)	Report	Tries: Mannering, Tuivasa-Sheck; Goals: Kahu (2/2)

Canberra Stadium, Canberra
Attendance: 18,535
Referee: Matt Cecchin (Australia)

Team details

FB	1	Darius Boyd
WG	2	Valentine Holmes
CE	3	Will Chambers
CE	4	Josh Dugan
WG	5	Blake Ferguson
FE	6	Johnathan Thurston
HB	7	Cooper Cronk
PR	8	Andrew Fifita
HK	9	Cameron Smith (c)
PR	10	David Klemmer
SR	11	Boyd Cordner
SR	12	Matt Gillett
LK	13	Trent Merrin
Interchange:
BE	14	Michael Morgan
BE	15	Jake Trbojevic
BE	16	Tyson Frizell
BE	17	Sam Thaiday
Coach:
Mal Meninga

FB	1	Roger Tuivasa-Sheck
WG	2	Dallin Watene-Zelezniak
CE	3	Jordan Kahu
CE	4	Dean Whare
WG	5	Jordan Rapana
FE	6	Kieran Foran
HB	7	Shaun Johnson
PR	8	Jesse Bromwich (c)
HK	9	Issac Luke
PR	10	Russell Packer
SR	11	Kevin Proctor
SR	12	Simon Mannering
LK	13	Jason Taumalolo
Interchange:
BE	14	Adam Blair
BE	15	Martin Taupau
BE	16	Kenny Bromwich
BE	17	Kodi Nikorima
Coach:
David Kidwell

Man of the Match:
Matt Gillett (Australia)

Touch judges:
Chris Butler (Australia)
Brett Suttor (Australia)
Video referees:
Luke Patten (Australia)
Bernard Sutton (Australia)

=== Papua New Guinea vs Cook Islands ===
6 May 2017
15:15 AEST (UTC+10)

Papua New Guinea	32 – 22	Cook Islands
Tries: Amean (2), Puara, Put, Wera; Goals: A. Boas (6/6)	Report	Tries: Daniela (2), Baker, Marsters; Goals: John (3/4)

Campbelltown Stadium, Sydney
Referee: James Child (England)

Team details

FB	1	Stargroth Amean
WG	2	Justin Olam
CE	3	Thompson Teteh
CE	4	Adex Wera
WG	5	Richard Pandia
FE	6	Ase Boas
HB	7	Watson Boas
PR	8	Henry Wan
HK	9	Wartovo Puara
PR	10	Luke Page
SR	11	Rhyse Martin
SR	12	Rod Griffin (c)
LK	13	Stanton Albert
Interchange:
BE	14	Tom Butterfield
BE	15	Wellington Albert
BE	16	Nixon Put
BE	17	Israel Eliab
Coach:
Michael Marum

FB	1	Charnze Nicoll-Klokstad
WG	2	Geoff Daniela
CE	3	Esan Marsters
CE	20	Marata Niukore
WG	5	Reubenn Rennie
FE	14	Johnathon Ford
HB	7	Isaac John
PR	16	Carne Doyle-Manga
HK	9	Aaron Teroi
PR	10	Uiti Baker
SR	11	Alex Glenn (c)
SR	12	Makahesi Makatoa
LK	13	David Munro
Interchange:
BE	8	Reuben Porter
BE	15	Moses Noovao-McGreal
BE	18	Kobe Tararo
BE	19	Sam Mataora
Coach:
Tony Iro

Man of the Match:
Stargroth Amean (Papua New Guinea)

Touch judges:
Nick Beashel (Australia)
Michael Wise (Australia)
Video referees:
Bryan Norrie (Australia)
Bernard Sutton (Australia)

=== Tonga vs Fiji ===
6 May 2017
17:30 AEST (UTC+10)

Tonga	26 – 24	Fiji
Tries: Latu (2), Suli, Tupou, Vatuvei; Goals: Hingano (2/2), Lolohea (1/3)	Report	Tries: Kikau, Nakubuwai, D. Saifiti, Storer; Goals: Koroisau (2/2), Moceidreke (2/2)

Campbelltown Stadium, Sydney
Referee: Ben Cummins (Australia)

Team details

FB	1	William Hopoate (c)
WG	2	Manu Vatuvei
CE	3	Brenko Lee
CE	4	Moses Suli
WG	5	Daniel Tupou
FE	6	Tuimoala Lolohea
HB	7	Ata Hingano
PR	8	Leilani Latu
HK	9	Siliva Havili
PR	10	Addin Fonua-Blake
SR	11	Felise Kaufusi
SR	12	Tony Williams
LK	13	Joe Ofahengaue
Interchange:
BE	14	Sione Katoa
BE	15	Patrick Kaufusi
BE	16	Leivaha Pulu
BE	17	Siosaia Vave
Coach:
Kristian Woolf

FB	1	Kevin Naiqama (c)
WG	2	Suliasi Vunivalu
CE	3	Waqa Blake
CE	4	Taane Milne
WG	5	Marcelo Montoya
FE	6	Sitiveni Moceidreke
HB	7	Henry Raiwalui
PR	8	Daniel Saifiti
HK	9	Apisai Koroisau
PR	10	Kane Evans
SR	11	Viliame Kikau
SR	12	Tui Kamikamica
LK	13	Korbin Sims
Interchange:
BE	14	James Storer
BE	15	Jacob Saifiti
BE	16	Eloni Vunakece
BE	17	Ben Nakubuwai
Coach:
Michael Potter

Man of the Match:
William Hopoate (Tonga)

Touch judges:
Tim Roby (England)
Belinda Sleeman (Australia)
Video referees:
Steve Chiddy (Australia)
Luke Patten (Australia)

=== England vs Samoa ===
6 May 2017
19:30 AEST (UTC+10)

England	30 – 10	Samoa
Tries: Graham, Hall, Hodgson, McGillvary, Ratchford; Goals: Gale (5/6)	Report	Tries: Leilua, Milford; Goals: Milford (1/2)

Campbelltown Stadium, Sydney
Attendance: 18,271
Referee: Gerard Sutton (Australia)

Team details

FB	1	Stefan Ratchford
WG	2	Jermaine McGillvary
CE	3	Kallum Watkins
CE	4	Zak Hardaker
WG	5	Ryan Hall
SO	6	Kevin Brown
SH	7	Luke Gale
PR	8	Sam Burgess
HK	9	Josh Hodgson
PR	10	James Graham
SR	11	Mike McMeeken
SR	12	Elliott Whitehead
LF	13	Sean O'Loughlin (c)
Interchange:
BE	14	Chris Hill
BE	15	Chris Heighington
BE	16	Chris McQueen
BE	17	Tom Burgess
Coach:
Wayne Bennett

FB	1	Peter Mata'utia
WG	2	Ken Maumalo
CE	3	Joseph Leilua
CE	4	Tim Lafai
WG	5	Antonio Winterstein
FE	6	Anthony Milford
HB	7	Fa'amanu Brown
PR	8	Sam Kasiano
HK	15	Suaia Matagi
PR	10	Junior Paulo
SR	11	Sione Mata'utia
SR	12	Leeson Ah Mau
LK	13	Josh McGuire (c)
Interchange:
BE	14	John Asiata
BE	16	Sauaso Sue
BE	17	Herman Ese'ese
BE	19	Pita Godinet
Coach:
Matt Parish

Man of the Match:
Elliott Whitehead (England)

Touch judges:
Ricky MacFarlane (Australia)
Jeff Younis (Australia)
Video referees:
Ben Galea (Australia)
Jared Maxwell (Australia)

=== Lebanon vs Malta ===
6 May 2017
19:30 AEST (UTC+10)

Lebanon	24 – 4	Malta
Tries: Miski (3), Barakat; Goals: Miski (4/4)	Report	Tries: Cauchi; Goals: Ellul (0/1)

New Era Stadium, Sydney
Referee: Rod McDonald (Australia)

Team details

FB	1	Abraham El Zakhem
WG	2	Eddy El Zbaidieh
CE	3	Danny Barakat
CE	4	James Elias
WG	5	Mario el Boustani
FE	6	Abbas Miski
HB	7	Adam Doueihi
PR	8	Ray Moujalli (c)
HK	9	Jamie Clark
PR	10	Mitchell Mamary
SR	11	Nick Kassis
SR	12	Ben Chahoud
LK	13	Andrew Kazzi
Interchange:
BE	14	Khalid Deeb
BE	15	Ahmad Ellaz
BE	16	Jaleel Seve-Derbas
BE	17	Mark Daoud
Coach:
Tarik Houchar

FB	1	Joel Bradford
WG	2	Nathan Benson
CE	3	Nathan Falzon
CE	4	Samuel Buttel
WG	5	Jye Ellul
FE	6	Aaron Grech
HB	7	Luke Cauchi
PR	8	Dean Zammit
HK	9	Jake Attard (c)
PR	10	Matt Thompson
SR	11	Ben Stone
SR	22	Aaron Weston
LK	13	Kyal Greene
Interchange:
BE	14	Dylan Wilson
BE	15	Matthew Jarrett
BE	16	James Harrison
BE	17	Nathan Simpson
Coach:
Peter Cassar

Touch judges:
Jordan Chidiac (Australia)
Robert Morey (Australia)

== June ==
=== Lebanon vs Italy ===
3 June 2017
20:00 EEST (UTC+3)

Lebanon	6 – 4	Italy
Tries: Tohme; Goals: Harb (1/2)	Report	Tries: Borina; Goals: Bergamasco (0/1)

Lebanese University, Beirut
Referee: Mikhael Shammas (Lebanon)

Team details

FB	1	Raymond Sabat
WG	2	Alfred Bowles
CE	3	Khaled el Rafii
CE	4	Jeffrey Tohme
WG	5	Jonas Moorkaar
FE	6	Wael Harb
HB	7	Imad Chidiac
PR	8	Toufic el Hage
HK	9	Gianni Hammoudeh
PR	10	Ziad Agha
SR	11	Kahil Bejjani
SR	12	Ali Abou Arabi
LK	13	Robin Hachache (c)
Interchange:
BE	14	Mike Tawk
BE	15	Robert Farjallah
BE	16	Jean-Marie Rizkallah
BE	17	Elie Bou Latouf
Coach:
Tarik Houchar

FB	1	Fabio Borina
WG	2	Alvise Rigo
CE	3	Emanuele Passera
CE	4	Mirco Bergamasco
WG	5	Edoardo Pezzano
FE	6	Jaume Giorgis
HB	7	Igor Giammario
PR	8	Tommaso Nicoli
HK	18	Simone Boscolo
PR	20	Giuseppe Pagani
SR	11	Asaf Hliwa
SR	12	Matthew Sands
LK	13	Gioele Celerino (c)
Interchange:
BE	10	Simone Stanissa
BE	14	Fabrizio Ciaurro
BE	16	Francesco Di Trapani
BE	19	Ismail Byaoui
Coach:
Kelly Rolleston

Touch judges:
Sami Assaf (Lebanon)
Nadeem Moughnieh (Lebanon)

=== Italy vs Spain ===
10 June 2017
14:00 CEST (UTC+2)

Italy	94 – 4	Spain
Tries: Celerino (3), Di Trapani (3), Bruzzone (2), Giorgis (2), Spinnato (2), Ciaurro, De Carli, Rigo, Sands; Goals: Bergamasco (13/14), Celerino (1/1), Sands (1/1)	Report (in Italian)	Tries: Infante; Goals: Bueno (0/1)

Manta Sports Complex, Cuneo

Team details

FB	1	Fabrizio Ciaurro
WG	2	Davide Spinnato
CE	3	Alvise Rigo
CE	4	Mirco Bergamasco
WG	5	Edoardo Pezzano
FE	6	Jaume Giorgis
HB	7	Igor Giammario
PR	8	Tommaso Nicoli
HK	9	Lorenzo Luccardi
PR	20	Giuseppe Pagani
SR	11	Lucas Bruzzone
SR	12	Matthew Sands
LK	13	Gioele Celerino (c)
Interchange:
BE	10	Francesco Di Trapani
BE	14	Carlo De Carli
BE	16	Paolo Radosta
BE	19	Ismail Byaoui
Coach:
Kelly Rolleston

FB	Andrew Pilkington
WG	Dani Morales
CE	Aitor Romero
CE	Salva Farjado
WG	Jonathan Infante
FE	Remy Bueno
HB	Ivan Ordaz
PR	Sergio Perez
HK	Miguel Olivares
PR	Vincente Cubes
SR	Aitor Davila
SR	Adrian Franco
LK	Raul Simo
Interchange:
BE	Carlos Jane
BE	Samuel Baeza
BE	Paco Luis Perez
Coach:
Darren Fisher

=== Norway vs Sweden ===
17 June 2017
14:00 CEST (UTC+2)

Norway	38 – 18	Sweden
Tries: Brekk (2), Mwikaria (2), Cummins, Mellor, Schmidt, Stenseth-Holm; Goals: Brekk (3/8)		Tries: Ah-Lam (3); Goals: Bignell (3/3)

Bislett Stadium, Oslo
Referee: Danny Boag

=== France vs England women's test series ===
Wednesday, 21 June 2017

France	16 — 26	England
Tries: 4 Manson Sanarra 2 Ophelia Coll; Sandrone Lloria; Goals: nil	HT: 4 – 22; Report	Tries: 5 Amy Hardcastle 3 Kayleigh Bulman; Kirsty Moroney; Goals: 3 Tara-Jane Stanley 3

Stade de la Mer, Perpignan

Team details

FB	1	Elise Ciria
WG	2	Norgane Richard
CE	3	Laureane Biville
CE	4	Lucre Castillo
WG	5	Manon Sanarra
SO	6	Ophelie Coll
SH	7	Alice Varela
PR	8	Cyndia Mansard
HK	9	Pauline Segvier
PR	10	Leila Bessahli
SR	11	Anniston Nikalef
SR	12	Gusenaelee Urbes
LF	13	Jeanne Bernard
Interchange:
IN	14	Fanny Ramos
IN	15	Perrine Nontsarrat
IN	16	Sandrine Lloria
IN	17	Gazelle Alvernye
Coach:

FB	1	Charlotte Booth
WG	2	Tara-Jane Stanley
CE	3	Amy Hardcastle
CE	4	Jess Courtman
WG	5	Kayleigh Bulman
SO	6	Faye Gaskin
SH	7	Kirsty Moroney
PR	8	Danika Priim
HK	9	Lois Forsell
PR	10	Chantelle Crowl
SR	11	Emily Rudge
SR	12	Shona Hoyle
LF	13	Andrea Dobson
Interchange:
IN	14	Natalie Harrowell
IN	15	Sinead Peach
IN	16	Brogan Churm
IN	17	Rachel Thompson
Coach: Chris Chapman

Saturday, 24 June 2017

France	8 — 14	England
Tries: 2 Manon Sanarra; Pauline Vaissiere; Goals: nil	HT: 4 – 6 Report	Tries: 3 Amy Hardcastle; Tara-Jane Stanley; Lois Forsell; Goals: 1 Tara-Jane Stanley

Stade de la Mer, Perpignan

Team details

FB	1	Elise Ciria
WG	2	Lucie Castillo
CE	3	Laureane Biville
CE	4	Manon Sanarra
WG	5	Pauline Vaissiere
SO	6	Amel Mohamdi
SH	7	Alice Varela
PR	8	Cyndia Mansard
HK	9	Fanny Ramos
PR	10	Leila Bessahli
SR	11	Gaelle Alverhne
SR	12	Anniston Nikalef
LF	13	Ophelie Coll
Interchange:
IN	14	Perrine Nontsarrat
IN	15	Pauline Segvier
IN	16	Sandrine Lloria
IN	17	Aimee Banukone
Coach:

FB	1	Charlotte Booth
WG	2	Tara-Jane Stanley
CE	3	Amy Hardcastle
CE	4	Rachel Thompson
WG	5	Kayleigh Bulman
SO	6	Claire Garner
SH	7	Kirsty Moroney
PR	8	Danika Priim
HK	9	Lois Forsell
PR	10	Andrea Dobson
SR	11	Shona Hoyle
SR	12	Natalie Harrowell
LF	13	Stacey White
Interchange:
IN	14	Tara Jones
IN	15	Chantelle Crowl
IN	16	Katie Hepworth
IN	17	Jess Courtman
Coach: Chris Chapman

== July ==
=== Hungary vs Poland ===
15 July 2017

Hungary	56 – 4	Polish XIII

Budapest

=== Hungary vs Czech Republic ===
22 July 2017

Hungary	6 – 26	Czech Republic
Tries: Nemes; Goals: Orsi (1/1)	Report	Tries: Gach, Hudrlík, Košťál, Mećava, Vojtěch; Goals: Řičica (3/5)

Budapest

=== United States vs Jamaica ===
22 July 2017
17:00 EDT (UTC−04)

United States	48 – 6	Jamaica
Tries: Vaivai (3), Alley, Farley, Frazier, Newlin, St John; Goals: Vaivai (8/8)	Report	Tries: Hall; Goals: Harris (1/2)

Hodges Stadium, Jacksonville
Referee: Adam Shelton (United States)

Team details

FB	1	Gabriel Farley
WG	2	Terrance Williams
CE	3	Taioalo Vaivai
CE	4	Taylor Alley
WG	5	Jonathan St John
FE	6	Dom DeFalco
HB	7	Matt Walsh
PR	8	Josh Rice
HK	9	Kristian Freed
PR	10	Andrew Kneisly
SR	11	Fotukava Malu
SR	12	David Ulch
LK	13	Nick Newlin (c)
Interchange:
BE	14	Sean Hunt
BE	15	Martwain Johnston
BE	16	Bart Longchamp
BE	17	Chris Frazier
Coach:
Sean Rutgerson

FB	1	Andrew Simpson
WG	2	Nathan Campbell
CE	18	Reinhardo Richards
CE	4	Owen Linton
WG	5	Keta Bryan
FE	6	Omar Jones
HB	7	Kareem Harris
PR	8	Brian Hutchinson
HK	14	Adrian Hall
PR	21	Romaen Campbell (c)
SR	11	Andre McFarlane
SR	12	Tyronie Rowe
LK	13	Leon Thomas
Interchange:
BE	16	Nicholas Wright
BE	17	Peter Tapper
BE	19	Demone McDougal
BE	20	Antonio Baker
Coach:
Romeo Monteith

== August ==
=== Denmark vs Norway ===
19 August 2017

Denmark	24 – 46	Norway
Tries: B. Simmonds (2), Mubanda, Sørensen, Whitehead; Goals: B. Simmonds (1/2), J. Simmonds (1/3)	Report	Tries: Mwikaria (3), Cummins, Kalvik, Milligan, Paulsen, Stalsberg; Goals: Cummins (7/8)

Copenhagen

Notes:

- Norway's squad included former Lebanese national representative Gilbert Haydamous.

=== Griffin Cup ===
26 August 2017
15:30 CEST (UTC+2)

Germany	18 – 30	Netherlands
Tries: Goncharev (2), Améfia, Hunz; Goals: Seelweger (1/4)	Report	Tries: Landus (2), de Ruiter (2), Razoux Schultz; Goals: Breman (5/5)

Barenteich, Osnabrück
Attendance: ≈200
Referee: Joel Holmes (England)

Team details

FB	1	Mawuli Améfia (c)
WG	2	Jannek Hagenah
CE	3	Philip Hunz
CE	4	Kyrill Goncharev
WG	5	David Ziekursch
FE	6	Vivien Seelweger
HB	7	Marc Zupan
PR	8	Karsten Brüning
HK	9	Liam Doughton
PR	10	Renko Flemming
SR	11	Phil Wadewitz
SR	12	Benedikt Esser
LK	13	Josh Leutenecker
Interchange:
BE	14	Benjamin Böse
BE	15	Zak Bredin
BE	16	Presley Chirombe
BE	17	Maurice Verstraten
Coach:
Simon Cooper

FB	21	Arie-Tjerk Razoux Schultz
WG	2	Santino Landus
CE	3	Thijs van de Zouwen
CE	4	Daan van Rossum
WG	5	Ruben Stuifzand
FE	6	Ben Dommershuijsen (c)
HB	7	Uri Breman
PR	8	Taco de Boer
HK	9	Benjamin van Bodegraven
PR	10	James Geurtjens
SR	11	Marijn Steenland
SR	18	Edson Aldair
LK	13	Daniël de Ruiter
Interchange:
BE	12	Shadan Lavia
BE	15	Hans Verveer
BE	17	Ciaran Jaras
BE	19	Bonne Wilce
Coach:
Kane Krlic

=== Jamaica vs Canada ===
26 August 2017
16:15 ET (UTC−05)

Jamaica	28 – 14	Canada
Tries: Walker (2), Harris, Miller, Shae, Turner; Goals: Jones-Bishop (2/6)	Report	Tries: Couzens, Felix, Schouten; Goals: McCarthy (1/3)

University of the West Indies, Kingston
Attendance: ≈1,500

Team details

FB	1	Joseph Shae
WG	18	Kenneth Walker
CE	3	Aaron Jones-Bishop
CE	4	Kareem Harris
WG	5	Andrew Simpson
FE	6	Fabion Turner
HB	7	Marvin Thompson
PR		Chevaughn Bailey
HK		Jermaine Pinnock
PR		Owen Linton
SR		Tyronie Rowe
SR		Leon Thomas
LK		Khamisi McKain
Interchange:
BE		Adrian Hall
BE		Ethon Dwyer
BE		Jason Gooden
BE		Steve Miller
Coach:
Romeo Monteith

FB	1	Kevin Gurniak
WG	2	Jeff Lohse
CE	3	Rick Schouten
CE	15	Ryan Murray
WG	5	Tony Felix
FE	6	Eddie Bilborough (c)
HB	7	Emil Borggren
PR	8	Eric Moyer
HK	9	Jack Couzens
PR	10	Denny McCarthy
SR	11	Joel Hulett
SR	12	Scyler Dumas
LK	13	Jon Cregg
Interchange:
BE	14	Matthew Gallagher
BE	16	Jordon Henry
BE	27	Cam Grace
BE	30	Chuck Curran
Coach:
Ben Fleming

== September ==
=== Netherlands vs Sweden ===
9 September 2017

Netherlands	28 – 24	Sweden
Tries: van Bodegraven, Lavia, Razoux Schultz, Wilce; Goals: Breman (6/6)	Report	Tries: Andréasson, Groth, Lazarov, Lindblom, Thorarinsson; Goals: Andréasson (2/5)

Amsterdamse Atletiek Club, Amsterdam

=== Canada vs United States ===
16 September 2017
19:00 EDT (UTC−04)

Canada	18 – 36	United States
Tries: Curry (2), Couzens; Goals: Ngawati (3/3)	Report	Tries: Faraimo (3), Alley (2), Johnston, Vaivai; Goals: Vaivai (3/6), Faraimo (1/1)

Lamport Stadium, Toronto
Attendance: 8,456

Team details

FB	1	Jared Curry
WG	2	Danny Tupou
CE	3	Jon Cregg
CE	4	Emil Borggren
WG	5	Jeff Lohse
FE	6	Eddie Bilborough (c)
HB	7	Connor Hunter
PR	8	Ruairi McGoff
HK	9	Jack Couzens
PR	10	Wes Black
SR	11	Quinn Ngawati
SR	12	Christian Miller
LK	27	Cam Grace
Interchange:
BE	13	Scyler Dumas
BE	17	Jason Hignell
BE	26	Denny McCarthy
BE	30	Chuck Curran
Coach:
Ben Fleming

FB	1	Gabriel Farley
WG	2	Bureta Faraimo
CE	3	Junior Vaivai
CE	4	Taylor Alley
WG	5	Martwain Johnston
FE	6	Pio Vatuvei
HB	7	Matt Walsh
PR	8	Joshua Rice
HK	9	CJ Cortalano
PR	10	Nick Newlin (c)
SR	11	Joe Eichner
SR	12	Fotukava Malu
LK	13	David Ulch
Interchange:
BE	14	Andrew Kneisly
BE	15	Chris Frazier
BE	16	Bart Longchamp
BE	17	Mike Elias
Coach:
Sean Rutgerson

=== Papua New Guinea vs Australia (women) ===
Saturday, 23 September 2017

Papua New Guinea	4 — 42	Australia
Tries: 1 Maima Wei 65'; Goals: nil Elvinah Aaron 0/1	HT: 0 – 30; NRL Stats; Reports	Tries: 8 Steph Hancock 2 (25', 35'); Corban McGregor 6'; Renae Kunst 14'; Kody House 30'; Talesha Quinn 38'; Meg Ward 43'; Jessica Sergis 60'; Goals: 5 Chelsea Baker 5/8 (16', 26', 36', 44', 60')

National Football Stadium, Port Moresby
Referee: Grant Atkins

Note: This match featured 20 players per side (13 on-field and 7 on the interchange bench) and was played as a curtain-raiser to a men's Prime Minister's XIII match.

Team details

FB	1	Helen Abau
WG	2	Joan Kuman
CE	3	Naomi Kaupa
CE	4	Vanessa Palme
WG	5	Elvinah Aaron
FE	6	Shirley Joe
HB	7	Fay Sogavo
PR	8	Maima Wei
HK	9	Della Audama
PR	10	Brenda Goro
SR	11	Vero Waula
SR	12	Carol Humeu
LK	13	Cathy Neap
Interchange:
IN	14	Martha Karl
IN	15	Mala Mark
IN	16	Grace Mark
IN	17	Akosita Baru
IN	18	Christie Bulhage
IN	19	Anne Oiufa
IN	21	Janet Michael
Coach: Dennis Miall

FB	1	Chelsea Baker
WG	2	Jessica Sergis
CE	3	Corban McGregor
CE	4	Amelia Kuk
WG	5	Meg Ward
FE	6	Ali Brigginshaw
HB	7	Zahara Temara
PR	8	Elianna Walton
HK	14	Sarah Walker
PR	10	Steph Hancock
SR	11	Kezie Apps
SR	12	Talesha Quinn
LK	13	Renae Kunst
Interchange:
IN	9	Jenni-Sue Hoepper
IN	15	Annette Brander
IN	16	Vanessa Foliaki
IN	17	Chelsea Lenarduzzi
IN	18	Lucy Lockhart
IN	19	Kody House
IN	20	Maddison Bennett
Coach: Brad Donald

== October ==
=== Balkans Championship ===
6 October 2017
20:30

Greece	68 – 8	Bulgaria
	Report

Belgrade

8 October 2017
13:00

Serbia	50 – 20	Bulgaria
	Report (in Serbian); Report

FK Heroj, Belgrade

8 October 2017
15:30

Serbia	50 – 8	Greece
Tries: Trifunović (2), Zogović (2), Ćalić, Mora, Petrović, Radić, Stošić; Goals: Vojislav Dedić (5/7), Zogović (2/2)	Report (in Serbian); Report	Tries: Kartsonakis; Goals: Bosmas (2/2)

FK Heroj, Belgrade
Attendance: ≈150
Referee: Slaviša Zekić (Serbia)

- Serbia win the Balkans Cup

=== Malta vs Italy ===
8 October 2017
14:30 AEDT (UTC+11)

Malta	24 – 24	Italy
Tries: Attard, K. Cassel, T. Cassel, Vassollo; Goals: Glanville (4/4)	Report (in Italian)	Tries: R. Parata (2), Campagnolo, Walker; Goals: Bergamasco (4/4)

Marconi Stadium, Sydney

Team details

FB	1	Joel Bradford
WG	2	Brodie Vassallo
CE	3	Cameron Mazzelli
CE	4	Kyle Cassel
WG	5	Nathan Falzon
FE	6	Aiden Glanville
HB	7	Luke Cauchi
PR	8	Dean Zammit
HK	9	Jake Attard (c)
PR	10	Cowen Epere
SR	11	Ben Stone
SR	12	Tyler Cassel
LK	13	Blake Phillips
Interchange:
BE	14	Aaron Grech
BE	15	Joshua Martin
BE	16	Kyal Greene
BE	17	Aaron Weston
Coach:
Peter Cassar; Aaron McDonald

FB	1	Christian Bate (c)
WG	2	Emanuele Passera
CE	3	Mirco Bergamasco
CE	4	Matt Parata
WG	5	Ethan Natoli
FE	9	Ricardo Parata
HB	6	Jack Campagnolo
PR	8	Alec Susino
HK	23	Dean Parata
PR	17	Anton Iaria
SR	21	Jayden Walker
SR	12	Gioele Celerino (c)
LK	13	Kieran Quabba
Interchange:
BE	7	Todd Sapienza
BE	11	Giuseppe Pagani
BE	14	Jaume Giorgis
BE	15	Angelo Piccone
Coach:
Cameron Ciraldo

=== France vs Jamaica ===
13 October 2017
19:00 CEST (UTC+2)

France	34 – 12	Jamaica
Tries: Ader (2), Cardace, Garcia, Jullien, Rouch; Goals: Barthau (5/6)	Report; Scorecard	Tries: Golding, Ogden; Goals: Jymel Coleman (2/3)

Stade Gilbert Brutus, Perpignan
Attendance: ≈6,500
Referee: Benjamin Casty (France)

Team details

FB	1	Mark Kheirallah
WG	2	Hakim Miloudi
CE	3	Bastien Ader
CE	4	Nabil Djalout
WG	5	Damien Cardace
FE	6	Théo Fages (c)
HB	7	William Barthau
PR	8	Julian Bousquet
HK	9	Guillaume Bonnet
PR	10	Maxime Hérold
SR	11	Benjamin Garcia
SR	12	Benjamin Jullien
LK	13	Jason Baitieri
Interchange:
BE	14	Romain Navarrete
BE	15	Mickaël Rouch
BE	16	Clément Boyer
BE	17	Éloi Pélissier
Coach:
Aurélien Cologni

FB	1	Ashton Golding
WG	17	Richie Barnett
CE	3	Michael Brown
CE	4	Joe Brown (c)
WG	5	Jacob Ogden	Booked
FE	6	Jermaine Coleman
HB	7	Jymel Coleman
PR	16	Jon Magrin
HK	9	Danny Thomas
PR	10	Jode Sheriffe
SR	11	Mo Agoro
SR	12	Omari Caro
LK	13	Alex Brown
Interchange:
BE	8	Ross Peltier
BE	14	Lamont Bryan
BE	15	Keenen Tomlinson
BE	18	Jamal Goodall
Coach:
Glenn Morrison

=== Malta vs Hungary ===
14 October 2017
16:15 AEDT (UTC+11)

Malta	48 – 16	Hungary
Tries: Vassallo (2), Attard, Campbell, Catania, Falzon, Glanville, Mazzelli; Goals: Glanville (6/9)	Report	Tries: Kovac (2), Varga; Goals: J. Farkas (2/3)

New Era Stadium, Sydney
Referee: Luke Heckendorf (Australia)

Team details

FB	1	Brodie Vassallo
WG	2	Nathan Benson
CE	3	Cameron Mazzelli
CE	4	Ian Catania
WG	5	Nathan Falzon
FE	6	Aiden Glanville
HB	7	Ryan Flintham
PR	8	Dean Zammit
HK	9	Jake Attard
PR	10	Kyal Greene
SR	11	Tyler Cassel	Booked
SR	12	Kyle Cassel
LK	13	Adam Campbell
Interchange:
BE	14	Aaron Grech
BE	15	Zac Camilleri
BE	17	Jake Scott
BE	22	Nathan Simpson
Coach:
Peter Cassar; Aaron McDonald

FB	1	Nathan Farkas
WG	2	Josh Warner
CE	3	James Arnese
CE	4	Brent Varga
WG	5	Stephen Kovacs
FE	6	Benjamin Bronzon
HB	7	Jared Farkas (c)
PR	8	Joseph Toth
HK	9	Aaron Farkas
PR	10	James Kovac
SR	11	Josh Institoris
SR	12	Paul McKewin
LK	13	Stuart Flanagan
Interchange:
BE	14	Norbert Csapkai
BE	15	David Balassa
BE	16	Joel Saaghy
BE	17	Karoly Acsai
Coach:
Jonathan Wilson
