= Billy McConnachie =

Scotland international rugby league footballer

Personal information
- Full name: William McConnachie
- Born: 16 July 1990 (age 35) Mount Isa, Queensland, Australia
- Height: 185 cm (6 ft 1 in)
- Weight: 100 kg (15 st 10 lb)

Playing information
- Position: Prop, Second-row
Club
Years	Team	Pld	T	G	FG	P
2013–	Ipswich Jets	85	18	0	0	72
Representative
Years	Team	Pld	T	G	FG	P
2016–	Scotland	2	0	0	0	0
- Source: As of 28 October 2016

Billy McConnachie (born 16 July 1990) is a Scotland international rugby league footballer who played as a prop or second-row for the Ipswich Jets in the Queensland Cup.

== Background ==
McConnachie was born in Mount Isa, Queensland, Australia.

== Career ==
McConnachie has represented Scotland at the 2016 Rugby League Four Nations. He made his representative début for Scotland against Australia in the opening match of the Four Nations.
