= 2016 Rugby League Four Nations =

2016 Four Nations
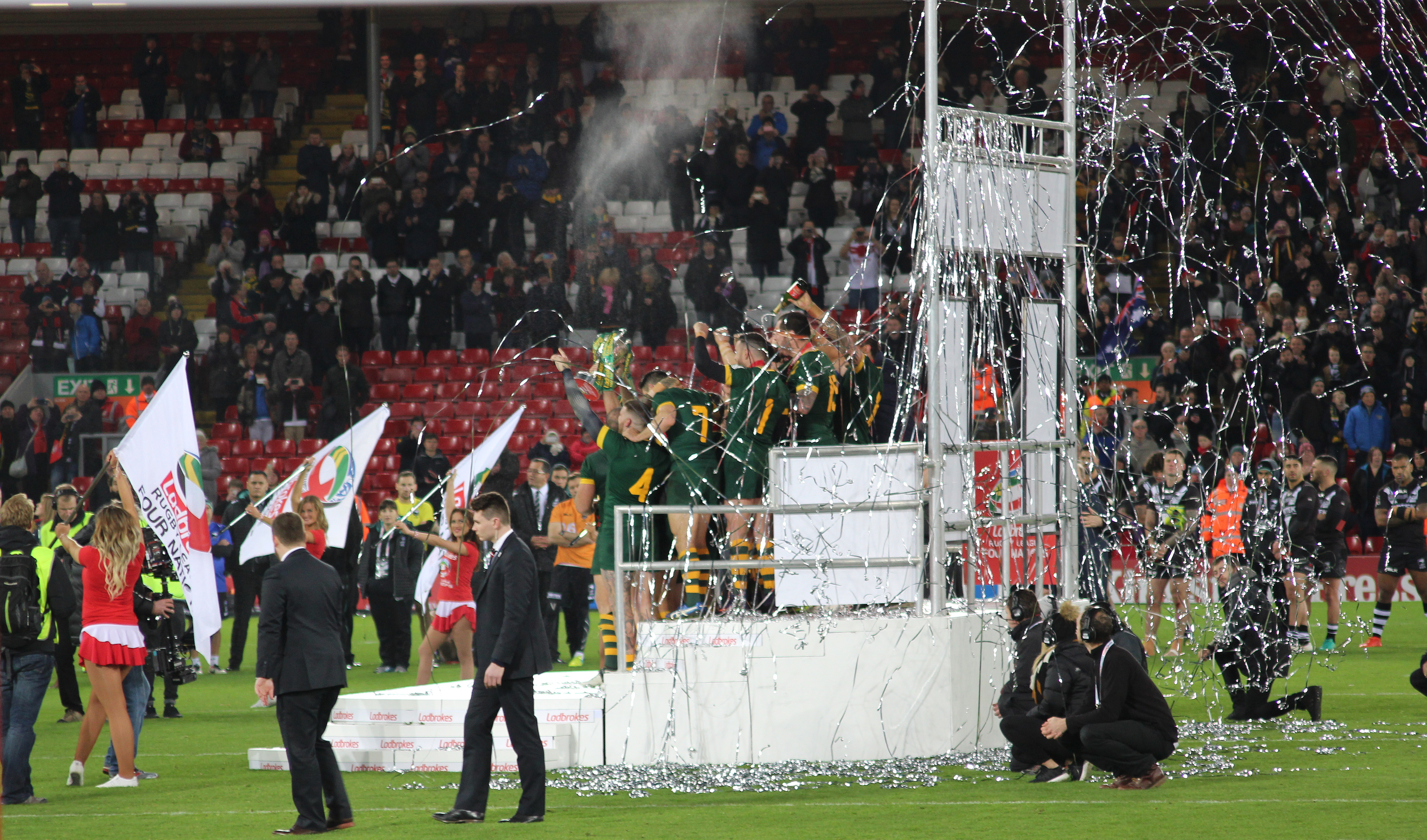
- Australia celebrating winning the 2016 Four Nations
- Host country: England
- Winner: Australia (3rd title)
- Matches played: 7
- Attendance: 132,655 (18,951 per match)
- Points scored: 259 (37 per match)
- Tries scored: 47 (6.71 per match)
- Top scorer: (Australia) Johnathan Thurston (32 points)
- Top try scorer: (Australia) Blake Ferguson (4 tries) (Australia) Josh Dugan

The 2016 Rugby League Four Nations tournament (known as the 2016 Ladbrokes Four Nations, for sponsorship purposes) was the fifth and final staging of the Rugby League Four Nations tournament and was played in England in October and November. The series was contested by Australia, England, New Zealand and Scotland, who qualified for their first Four Nations by winning the 2014 European Cup. The final was played on 20 November, with Australia winning its third tournament, defeating New Zealand.

== Background ==
The 2016 tournament is the fifth Four Nations series to be planned before the 2017 Rugby League World Cup, with the venues rotating between Europe and the South Pacific.

In addition to automatic inclusions Australia, England and New Zealand, Scotland qualified for the tournament by defeating France in the final of the 2014 European Cup.

England have previously co-hosted tournaments with other European nations and the Rugby Football League (RFL) planned to take a game up into Scotland but backed down and decided to take games to other venues.

The redeveloped 54,074 capacity Anfield Stadium hosted the Four Nations Final. This was the first time in 19 years the venue had held a rugby league match. Three rugby league games have been played at Anfield before. The final was the first ever international rugby league match held at the venue.

== Teams ==
Country	Previous appearances in tournament	Continent
Australia	4 (2009*, 2010, 2011*, 2014)	Oceania
England	4 (2009, 2010, 2011, 2014)	Europe
New Zealand	4 (2009, 2010*, 2011, 2014*)	Oceania
Scotland	0 (Debut)	Europe

* Denotes winner of tournament event.

== Venues ==
The games were played at the following venues in England. The tournament final was played at Anfield.

Liverpool	London	Coventry
Anfield	London Stadium	Ricoh Arena
Capacity: 54,074	Capacity: 66,000	Capacity: 32,609
Huddersfield	Hull	Workington
John Smith's Stadium	KC Lightstream Stadium	Derwent Park
Capacity: 24,500	Capacity: 12,225	Capacity: 10,000
2016 Rugby League Four Nations is located in England

== Officiating ==
Referees	Touch judges	Video Referees
(Australia) Ben Cummins	(England) James Child	(Australia) Bernard Sutton
(England) Robert Hicks	(England) Joe Cobb	(England) Ben Thaler
(Australia) Gerard Sutton	(England) Mick Craven	
(England) Ben Thaler	(New Zealand) Anthony Elliot	
	(England) Chris Kendall	

== Pre-tournament matches ==
Before the series, Australia and New Zealand organised to play the first ever International rugby league test-match in Perth, Scotland took on a Cumbrian rugby league team and England took on France in Avignon.

=== Australia vs New Zealand ===
Saturday, 15 October
5:15pm (AWST)

Australia	26–6	New Zealand
Tries: Inglis (15', 68') 2 D Boyd (9') 1 Holmes (44') 1 Cordner (78') 1 Goals: Thurston 3/5 (45', 69', 79')	1st: 8 – 6; 2nd: 18 – 0 Report	Tries: 1 (21') Proctor; Goals: 1/1 Luke (22')

nib Stadium, Perth
Attendance: 20,283
Referee: (Australia) Matt Cecchin
Player of the Match: Greg Inglis

Australia	New Zealand

FB	1	Darius Boyd
RW	2	Blake Ferguson
RC	3	Greg Inglis
LC	4	Josh Dugan
LW	5	Valentine Holmes
FE	6	Johnathan Thurston
HB	7	Cooper Cronk
PR	8	Matt Scott
HK	9	Cameron Smith (c)
PR	10	Shannon Boyd
SR	11	Boyd Cordner
SR	12	Matt Gillett
LK	13	Trent Merrin
Interchange:
IC	14	David Klemmer
IC	15	Michael Morgan
IC	16	Tyson Frizell
IC	17	Sam Thaiday
Coach:
(Australia) Mal Meninga

FB	1	Jordan Kahu
RW	2	Jason Nightingale
RC	3	Solomone Kata
LC	4	Shaun Kenny-Dowall
LW	5	Jordan Rapana
FE	6	Thomas Leuluai
HB	7	Shaun Johnson
PR	8	Jesse Bromwich (c)
HK	9	Issac Luke
PR	10	Jared Waerea-Hargreaves
SR	11	Kevin Proctor
SR	12	Tohu Harris
LK	13	Jason Taumalolo
Interchange:
IC	14	Lewis Brown
IC	15	Martin Taupau
IC	16	Manu Ma'u
IC	17	Adam Blair
Coach:
(New Zealand) David Kidwell

=== Cumbria Select XIII vs Scotland ===
The Cumbria Select XIII was a Cumbrian-based team selected by retiring Barrow Raiders player Liam Harrison. The Cumbrian side featured Scottish internationals Oliver Wilkes and Shane Toal.

Friday, 21 October

Cumbria Select XIII	16–48	Scotland
Tries: Fleming (37', 45') 2 Fieldhouse (26') 1 Goals: Hankinson 2/3 (27', 38')	Report	Tries: 2 (3', 22') Scott; 1 (16') C Phillips; 1 (19') Mariano; 1 (33') Brierley; 1 (58') Walker; 1 (69') Cassel; 1 (78') Tierney; Goals: 5/8 Brierley (4', 17', 34', 59', 80')

Craven Park, Barrow-in-Furness
Attendance: 1,048

Cumbria XIII	Scotland

FB	1	Ryan Fieldhouse
RW	2	Eze Harper
RC	3	Chris Hankinson
LC	4	Chris Fleming
LW	5	Shane Toal
FE	6	Jamie Dallimore
HB	7	Liam Finch
PR	10	Oliver Wilkes
HK	9	Karl Ashall
PR	8	Joe Bullock
SR	11	Liam Harrison (c)
SR	12	Bradd Crellin
LK	13	Daniel Toal
Interchange:
IC	14	Dan Abram
IC	15	Brad Marwood
IC	16	Matty Holmes
IC	17	Andrew Dawson
IC	18	Brad Brennan
IC	19	Matty While
IC	20	Luke Cresswell
IC	21	Ethan Kelly
Coach:
(England) Liam Harrison

FB	1	Matty Russell
RW	2	Lewis Tierney
RC	3	Ben Hellewell
LC	4	Tyler Cassel
LW	5	David Scott
FE	6	Danny Addy
HB	7	Ryan Brierley
PR	8	Adam Walker
HK	9	Liam Hood
PR	10	Frankie Mariano
SR	11	Brett Phillips
SR	12	Dale Ferguson
LK	13	Ben Kavanagh
Interchange:
IC	14	Callum Phillips
IC	15	Sam Brooks
IC	16	Sheldon Powe-Hobbs
IC	17	Billy McConnachie
IC	18	Kieran Moran
IC	19	Ryan Maneely
Coach:
(England) Steve McCormack

=== France vs England ===
Saturday, 22 October
6:30pm (CET)

France	6–40	England
Tries: Pélissier (19') 1 Goals: Gigot 1/1 (20')	Report	Tries: 2 (26', 40') Hall; 1 (30') Clark; 1 (35') T Burgess; 1 (68') Brown; 1 (71') McGillvary; 1 (76') Widdop; Goals: 6/7 Widdop (27', 31', 36', 69', 72', 77')

Parc des Sports, Avignon
Attendance: 14,276
Referee: (England) Phil Bentham

France	England

FB	1	Tony Gigot
RW	2	Mathias Pala
RC	3	Benjamin Garcia
LC	4	Vincent Duport
LW	5	Olivier Arnaud
SO	6	Stanislas Robin
SH	7	William Barthau
PR	8	Romain Navarrete
HK	9	Alrix Da Costa
PR	10	Rémi Casty (c)
SR	11	Mickaël Simon
SR	12	Benjamin Jullien
LF	13	Julian Bousquet
Substitutions:
BE	14	Éloi Pélissier
BE	15	Mickaël Goudemand
BE	16	Gadwin Springer
BE	17	Kevin Larroyer
Coach:
(France) Aurélien Cologni

FB	1	Jonny Lomax
RW	2	Jermaine McGillvary
RC	3	Kallum Watkins
LC	4	Mark Percival
LW	5	Ryan Hall
SO	6	Gareth Widdop
SH	7	Luke Gale
PR	8	James Graham (c)
HK	9	Josh Hodgson
PR	10	Scott Taylor
SR	11	Elliott Whitehead
SR	12	Michael Cooper
LF	13	Tom Burgess
Substitutions:
BE	14	George Burgess
BE	15	Kevin Brown
BE	16	Stefan Ratchford
BE	17	Daryl Clark
Coach:
(Australia) Wayne Bennett

== Results ==
=== Standings ===
2016 Four Nations
Pos	Team	Pld	W	D	L	PF	PA	PD	Pts	Qualification
1	Australia	3	3	0	0	104	38	+66	6	Qualification for Final
2	New Zealand	3	1	1	1	43	48	−5	3	Qualification for Final
3	England	3	1	0	2	72	65	+7	2	
4	Scotland	3	0	1	2	42	110	−68	1	

Source: BBC Sport
- By holding New Zealand to an 18–18 draw in the third round, Scotland became the first 'fourth nation' to score a championship point in the history of the tournament.

=== Round 1 ===
Friday, 28 October
8:00pm (UTC)

Australia	54–12	Scotland
Tries: Cronk (10', 15') 2 Mansour (26', 35') 2 Ferguson (6') 1 Maloney (13') 1 Dugan (44') 1 Frizell (66') 1 Morgan (69') 1 Trbojevic (79') 1 Goals: Maloney 7/10 (11', 14', 16', 45', 67', 70', 80')	1st: 30 – 6; 2nd: 24 – 6 Report	Tries: 1 (39') Brierley; 1 (59') Kavanagh; Goals: 2/2 Brough (40', 60')

KC Lightstream Stadium, Hull
Attendance: 5,337
Referee: (England) Ben Thaler
Player of the Match: Matt Moylan

Australia	Scotland

FB	1	Matt Moylan
RW	2	Josh Mansour
RC	3	Justin O'Neill
LC	4	Josh Dugan
LW	5	Blake Ferguson
FE	6	James Maloney
HB	7	Cooper Cronk
PR	8	Aaron Woods
HK	9	Cameron Smith (c)
PR	10	David Klemmer
SR	11	Sam Thaiday
SR	12	Tyson Frizell
LK	13	Jake Trbojevic
Interchange:
IC	14	Jake Friend
IC	15	Shannon Boyd
IC	16	Trent Merrin
IC	17	Michael Morgan
Coach:
(Australia) Mal Meninga

FB	1	Lachlan Coote
RW	2	Lewis Tierney
RC	3	Euan Aitken
LC	4	Kane Linnett
LW	5	Matty Russell
FE	6	Danny Brough (c)
HB	7	Ryan Brierley
PR	8	Adam Walker
HK	9	Liam Hood
PR	10	Luke Douglas
SR	11	Danny Addy
SR	12	Dale Ferguson
LK	13	Ben Kavanagh
Interchange:
IC	14	Ben Hellewell
IC	15	Sheldon Powe-Hobbs
IC	16	Sam Brooks
IC	17	Billy McConnachie
Coach:
(England) Steve McCormack

Touch Judges:
(England) Jack Smith
(England) Mick Craven
Video Referee:
(Australia) Bernard Sutton
Reserve Referee:
(Australia) Gerard Sutton

Saturday, 29 October
2:30pm (UTC)

England	16–17	New Zealand
Tries: McGillvary (48') 1 Hall (61') 1 Goals: Widdop 4/4 (3' pen, 11' pen, 49', 62')	1st: 4 – 6; 2nd: 12 – 11; Report	Tries: 2 (35', 56') Rapana; 1 (42') Johnson; Goals: 2/4 Kahu (31' pen, 43'); Field Goals: 1 (65') Johnson

John Smith's Stadium, Huddersfield
Attendance: 24,070
Referee: (England) Robert Hicks
Player of the Match: Shaun Johnson

England	New Zealand

FB	1	Jonny Lomax
RW	2	Jermaine McGillvary
RC	3	Kallum Watkins
LC	4	Dan Sarginson
LW	5	Ryan Hall
SO	6	Gareth Widdop
SH	7	Luke Gale
PR	8	Chris Hill
HK	9	Josh Hodgson
PR	10	James Graham
SR	11	Elliott Whitehead
SR	12	John Bateman
LF	13	Sam Burgess (c)
Substitutions:
BE	14	Tom Burgess
BE	15	George Burgess
BE	16	Michael Cooper
BE	17	Daryl Clark
Coach:
(Australia) Wayne Bennett

FB	1	Jordan Kahu
RW	2	Jason Nightingale
RC	3	Solomone Kata
LC	4	Shaun Kenny-Dowall
LW	5	Jordan Rapana
FE	6	Thomas Leuluai
HB	7	Shaun Johnson
PR	8	Jesse Bromwich (c)
HK	9	Issac Luke
PR	10	Jared Waerea-Hargreaves
SR	11	Kevin Proctor
SR	12	Tohu Harris
LK	13	Jason Taumalolo
Interchange:
IC	14	Lewis Brown
IC	15	Martin Taupau
IC	16	Manu Ma'u
IC	17	Adam Blair
Coach:
(New Zealand) David Kidwell

Touch Judges:
(England) James Child
(New Zealand) Anthony Elliott
Video Referee:
(Australia) Bernard Sutton
Reserve Referee:
(Australia) Ben Cummins

=== Round 2 ===
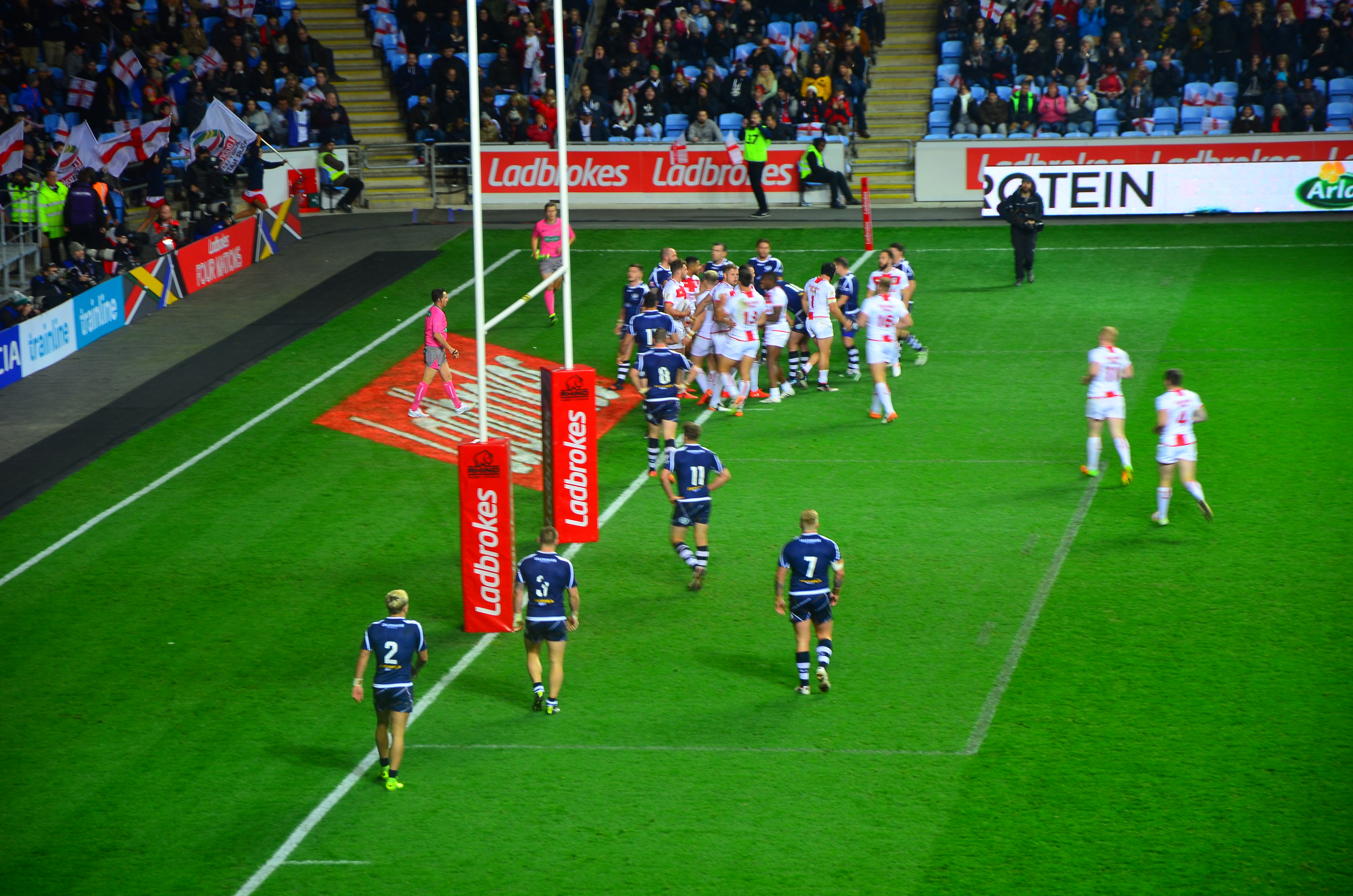
England vs Scotland in their first ever match against each other at the 2016 Four Nations

Saturday, 5 November
5:30pm (BST)

England	38–12	Scotland
Tries: Whitehead (27', 36') 2 Percival (50') 1 Hall (54') 1 McGillvary (58') 1 Gale (64') 1 Farrell (80') 1 Goals: Gale 5/7 (28', 37', 55', 65', 80')	1st: 12 – 8; 2nd: 26 – 4 Report	Tries: 1 (6') Linnett; 1 (24') Russell; 1 (70') Ferguson; Goals: 0/3 Brough; Sin Bin: Brough (yellow card) 58' to 68'

Ricoh Arena, Coventry
Attendance: 21,009
Referee: (Australia) Gerard Sutton
Player of the Match: George Williams

England	Scotland

FB	1	Jonny Lomax
RW	2	Jermaine McGillvary
RC	3	Kallum Watkins
LC	4	Mark Percival
LW	5	Ryan Hall
SO	6	George Williams
SH	7	Luke Gale
PR	8	Chris Hill
HK	9	Josh Hodgson
PR	10	Scott Taylor
SR	11	Liam Farrell
SR	12	Elliott Whitehead
LF	13	Sam Burgess (c)
Substitutions:
BE	14	Tom Burgess
BE	15	George Burgess
BE	16	Michael Cooper
BE	17	Daryl Clark
Coach:
(Australia) Wayne Bennett

FB	1	Lachlan Coote
RW	2	Lewis Tierney
RC	3	Euan Aitken
LC	4	Kane Linnett
LW	5	Matty Russell
FE	6	Danny Brough (c)
HB	7	Danny Addy
PR	8	Adam Walker
HK	9	Liam Hood
PR	10	Luke Douglas
SR	11	Ben Hellewell
SR	12	Dale Ferguson
LK	13	Ben Kavanagh
Interchange:
IC	14	Tyler Cassel
IC	15	Frankie Mariano
IC	16	Callum Phillips
IC	17	Sam Brooks
Coach:
(England) Steve McCormack

Touch Judges:
(England) Mick Craven
(England) Chris Kendall
Video Referee:
(England) Ben Thaler
Reserve Referee:
(England) Robert Hicks

Saturday, 5 November
8:00pm (BST)

New Zealand	8–14	Australia
Tries: Kata (49') 1 Rapana (77') 1 Goals: Johnson 0/2	1st: 0 – 10; 2nd: 8 – 4 Report	Tries: 1 (10') Ferguson; 1 (15') Thurston; Goals: 3/4 Thurston (16', 55' pen, 71' pen)

Ricoh Arena, Coventry
Attendance: 21,009
Referee: (Australia) Ben Cummins
Player of the Match: Blake Ferguson

New Zealand	Australia

FB	1	Jordan Kahu
RW	2	Gerard Beale
RC	3	Solomone Kata
LC	4	Shaun Kenny-Dowall
LW	5	Jordan Rapana
FE	6	Thomas Leuluai
HB	7	Shaun Johnson
PR	8	Jesse Bromwich (c)
HK	9	Issac Luke
PR	17	Greg Eastwood
SR	11	Kevin Proctor
SR	12	Tohu Harris
LK	13	Jason Taumalolo
Interchange:
IC	10	Adam Blair
IC	14	Lewis Brown
IC	15	Martin Taupau
IC	16	Manu Ma'u
Coach:
(New Zealand) David Kidwell

FB	1	Darius Boyd
RW	2	Valentine Holmes
RC	3	Greg Inglis
LC	4	Justin O'Neill
LW	5	Blake Ferguson
FE	6	Michael Morgan
HB	7	Johnathan Thurston
PR	8	Matt Scott
HK	9	Cameron Smith (c)
PR	10	Aaron Woods
SR	11	Boyd Cordner
SR	12	Matt Gillett
LK	13	Trent Merrin
Interchange:
IC	14	Shannon Boyd
IC	15	James Maloney
IC	16	David Klemmer
IC	17	Sam Thaiday
Coach:
(Australia) Mal Meninga

Touch Judges:
(New Zealand) Anthony Elliott
(England) Joe Cobb
Video Referee:
(Australia) Bernard Sutton
Reserve Referee:
(England) Robert Hicks

=== Round 3 ===
Friday, 11 November
8:00pm (BST)

New Zealand	18–18	Scotland
Tries: Fusitu'a (24', 55') 2 Beale (73', 76') 2 Goals: Luke 1/4 (25')	1st: 6 – 4; 2nd: 12 – 14; Report	Tries: 1 (27') Tierney; 1 (67') Hellewelll; 1 (79') Aitken; Goals: 3/4 Brough (68', 70' pen, 80')

Derwent Park, Workington
Attendance: 6,628
Referee: (Australia) Ben Cummins
Player of the Match: Shaun Johnson

New Zealand	Scotland

FB	1	Dallin Watene-Zelezniak
RW	2	Jason Nightingale
RC	3	Solomone Kata
LC	4	Gerard Beale
LW	5	David Fusitu'a
FE	6	Thomas Leuluai
HB	7	Shaun Johnson
PR	8	Jesse Bromwich (c)
HK	9	Issac Luke
PR	10	Adam Blair
SR	11	Manu Ma'u
SR	12	Tohu Harris
LK	13	Greg Eastwood
Interchange:
IC	14	Te Maire Martin
IC	15	Martin Taupau
IC	16	James Fisher-Harris
IC	17	Joseph Tapine
Coach:
(New Zealand) David Kidwell

FB	1	Lachlan Coote
RW	2	Lewis Tierney
RC	3	Euan Aitken
LC	4	Kane Linnett
LW	5	Matty Russell
FE	7	Danny Addy
HB	18	Danny Brough (c)
PR	8	Adam Walker
HK	9	Liam Hood
PR	10	Luke Douglas
SR	11	Ben Hellewell
SR	12	Dale Ferguson
LK	13	Ben Kavanagh
Interchange:
IC	14	Ryan Brierley
IC	15	Frankie Mariano
IC	16	Callum Phillips
IC	17	Billy McConnachie
Coach:
(England) Steve McCormack

Touch Judges:
(England) James Child
(England) Chris Kendall
Video Referee:
(England) Ben Thaler
Reserve Referee:
(Australia) Gerard Sutton

Sunday, 13 November
2:00pm (BST)

England	18–36	Australia
Tries: McGillvary (26') 1 Widdop (67') 1 Hall (76') 1 Goals: Widdop 3/4 (12' pen, 68', 77')	1st: 6 – 10; 2nd: 12 – 26; Report	Tries: 1 (36') Ferguson; 1 (47') Inglis; 1 (57') Scott; 1 (59') Dugan; 1 (72') Gillett; 1 (79') Holmes; Goals: 6/8 Thurston (18' pen, 37', 40' pen, 49', 58', 60')

London Stadium, London
Attendance: 35,569
Referee: (England) Robert Hicks
Player of the Match: Cooper Cronk

England	Australia

FB	1	Jonny Lomax
RW	2	Jermaine McGillvary
RC	3	Kallum Watkins
LC	4	Mark Percival
LW	5	Ryan Hall
SO	6	Kevin Brown
SH	7	Gareth Widdop
PR	8	Chris Hill
HK	9	Josh Hodgson
PR	10	James Graham
SR	11	John Bateman
SR	12	Elliott Whitehead
LF	13	Sam Burgess (c)
Substitutions:
BE	14	Tom Burgess
BE	15	George Burgess
BE	16	Michael Cooper
BE	17	George Williams
Coach:
(Australia) Wayne Bennett

FB	1	Darius Boyd
RW	2	Valentine Holmes
RC	3	Greg Inglis
LC	4	Josh Dugan
LW	5	Blake Ferguson
FE	6	Johnathan Thurston
HB	7	Cooper Cronk
PR	8	Matt Scott
HK	9	Cameron Smith (c)
PR	10	Aaron Woods
SR	11	Boyd Cordner
SR	12	Matt Gillett
LK	13	Trent Merrin
Interchange:
IC	14	David Klemmer
IC	15	Michael Morgan
IC	16	Tyson Frizell
IC	17	Sam Thaiday
Coach:
(Australia) Mal Meninga

The match was originally scheduled to kick-off at 3:30pm BST, however on 22 September the RFL changed the kick-off time to 2:00pm BST.

Touch Judges:
(New Zealand) Anthony Elliott
(England) Mick Craven
Video Referee:
(Australia) Bernard Sutton
Reserve Referee:
(Australia) Ben Cummins

=== Final ===
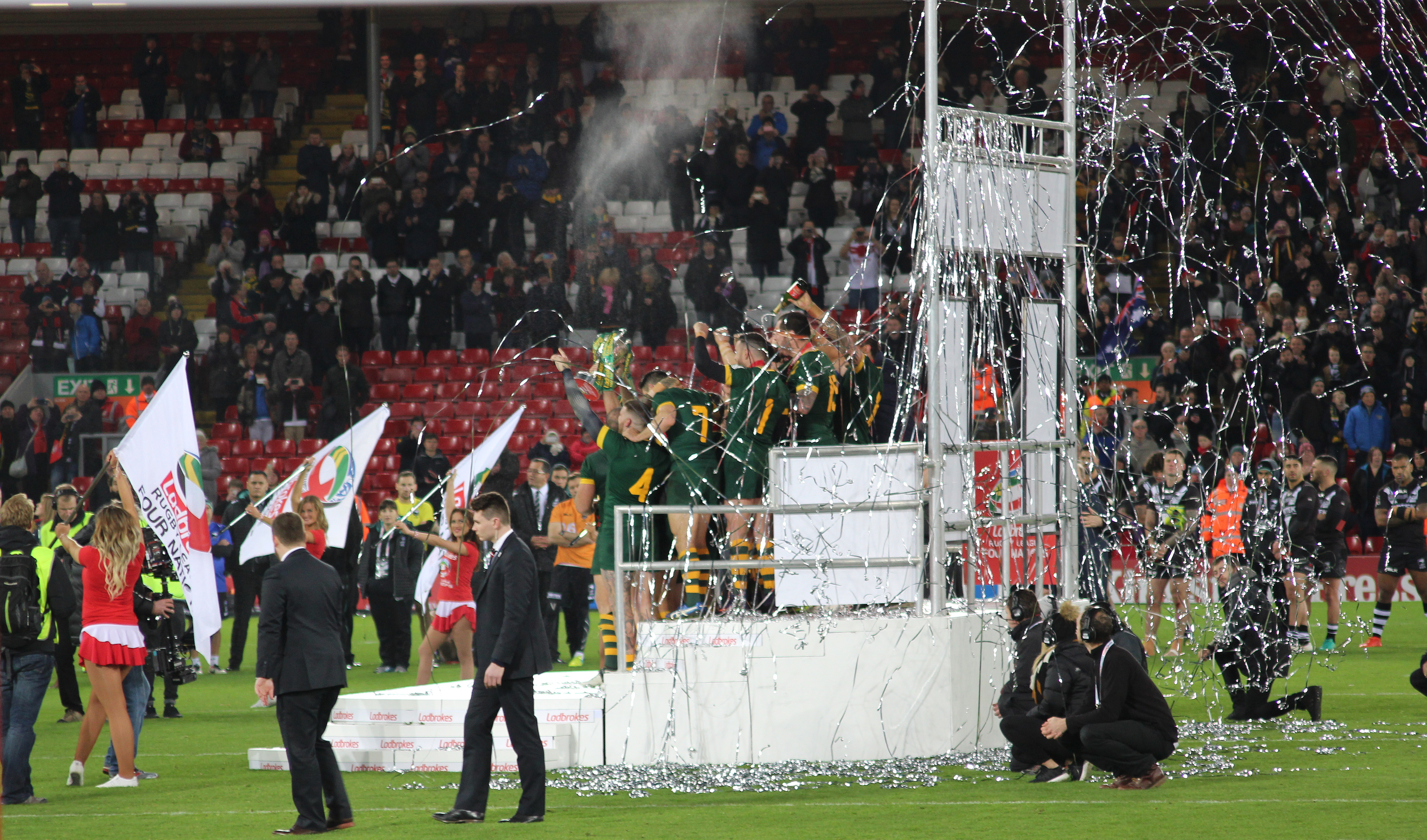
Australia celebrate beating the New Zealand at Anfield in the final.

Sunday, 20 November
2:30pm (BST)

Australia	34–8	New Zealand
Tries: Dugan (10', 24') 2 Ferguson (3') 1 Merrin (21') 1 D Boyd (45') 1 Cordner (74') 1 Goals: 5/8 Thurston (4', 18' pen, 22', 29' pen, 75')	1st: 24 – 0; 2nd: 10 – 8 Report	Tries: 2 (56', 69') Kahu; Goals:

Anfield, Liverpool
Attendance: 40,042
Referee: (Australia) Ben Cummins
Player of the Match: Darius Boyd

Australia	New Zealand

FB	1	Darius Boyd
RW	2	Blake Ferguson
RC	3	Greg Inglis
LC	4	Josh Dugan
LW	5	Valentine Holmes
FE	6	Johnathan Thurston
HB	7	Cooper Cronk
PR	8	Matt Scott
HK	9	Cameron Smith (c)
PR	10	Aaron Woods
SR	11	Boyd Cordner
SR	12	Matt Gillett
LK	13	Trent Merrin
Interchange:
IC	14	Michael Morgan
IC	15	David Klemmer
IC	16	Tyson Frizell
IC	17	Shannon Boyd
Coach:
(Australia) Mal Meninga

FB	1	Jordan Kahu
RW	2	David Fusitu'a
RC	3	Solomone Kata
LC	4	Shaun Kenny-Dowall
LW	5	Jordan Rapana
FE	6	Tohu Harris
HB	7	Shaun Johnson
PR	8	Jesse Bromwich (c)
HK	9	Issac Luke
PR	10	Adam Blair
SR	11	Kevin Proctor
SR	12	Manu Ma'u
LK	13	Jason Taumalolo
Interchange:
IC	14	Lewis Brown
IC	15	Martin Taupau
IC	16	Greg Eastwood
IC	17	Joseph Tapine
Coach:
(New Zealand) David Kidwell

== Player statistics ==
Top point scorers
	Player	Team	T	G	FG	Pts
1	Johnathan Thurston	Australia	1	14	0	32
2	James Maloney	Australia	1	7	0	18
2	Gareth Widdop	England	1	7	0	18
4	Josh Dugan	Australia	4	0	0	16
4	Blake Ferguson	Australia	4	0	0	16

Top try scorers
	Player	Team	T
1	Josh Dugan	Australia	4
1	Blake Ferguson	Australia	4
3	Jordan Rapana	New Zealand	3
3	Ryan Hall	England	3
3	Jermaine McGillvary	England	3

=== Player of the Tournament ===
- Cooper Cronk

== Broadcasting ==
Premier Sports was the host broadcaster for every match of the tournament.

Country	Broadcaster	Matches
England	Premier Sports	Every match live
England	BBC	Every England match, Australia v New Zealand, and the final live
Australia	Nine Network	Every match live
New Zealand	Sky Sport	Every match live
France	beIN Sports	Every match live
