= Esan Marsters =

Cook Islands & NZ international rugby league footballer

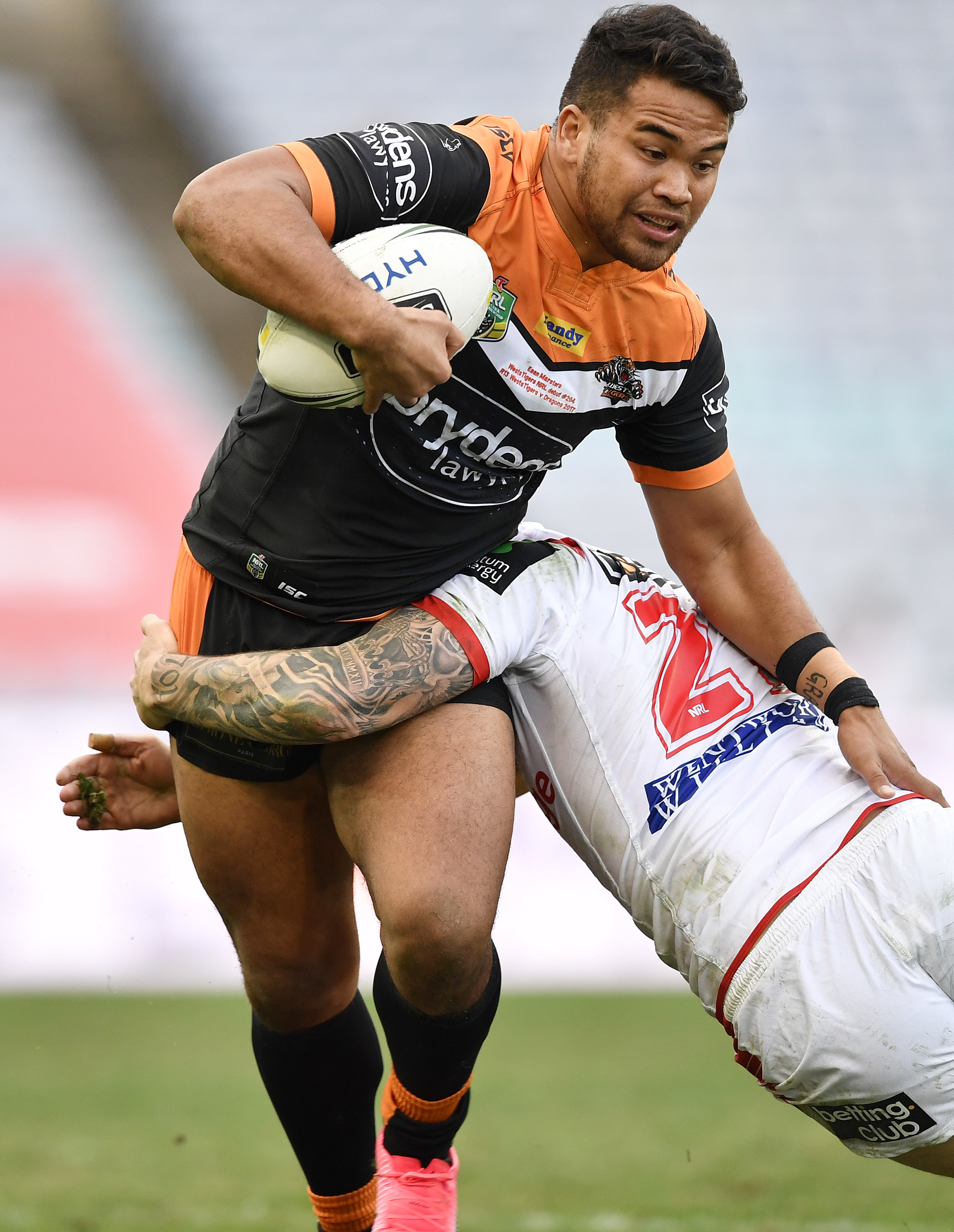

Personal information
- Full name: Esan Nike Marsters-Siavale
- Born: 17 August 1996 (age 30) Auckland, New Zealand
- Height: 6 ft 1 in (1.85 m)
- Weight: 15 st 10 lb (100 kg)

Playing information
- Position: Centre, Stand-off, Fullback
Club
Years	Team	Pld	T	G	FG	P
2017–19	Wests Tigers	61	17	96	0	260
2020–21	North Qld Cowboys	15	2	0	0	8
2021–22	Gold Coast Titans	10	2	0	0	8
2023–24	Huddersfield Giants	43	10	0	0	40
2025	Salford Red Devils	23	5	0	0	20
2026–	Bradford Bulls	11	2	0	0	8
	Total	163	38	96	0	344
Representative
Years	Team	Pld	T	G	FG	P
2015–	Cook Islands	16	3	3	0	18
2018–19	New Zealand	6	3	5	0	22
2019–22	New Zealand Māori	4	2	0	0	8
- Source: As of 31 October 2026
- Relatives: Steven Marsters (cousin)

Esan Marsters (born 17 August 1996) is a professional rugby league footballer who plays as a centre or stand-off for the Bradford Bulls in the Super League. He has played for the Cook Islands, New Zealand and the New Zealand Māori at international level.

He previously played for the Wests Tigers, North Queensland Cowboys and the Gold Coast Titans in the National Rugby League.

== Background ==
Marsters was born in Auckland, New Zealand, and is of Cook Island and Māori descent.

He played for Mount Albert Lions in New Zealand, later saying, "I played in the halves growing up. I was a five-eighth, like Benji. That’s where I get my ball skills from. Then I moved over to Sydney from Auckland when I was 17 and got switched to the centres. I was bigger than a lot of the other kids and they wanted to use me out wide." Marsters picked up a contract with the Sydney Roosters to train with their SG Ball team. After spending a season with Roosters SG Ball team he was cut and signed a contract with the Wests Tigers NYC team.

== Playing career ==
=== Early career ===
In 2015 and 2016, Marsters played for the Wests Tigers' NYC team.

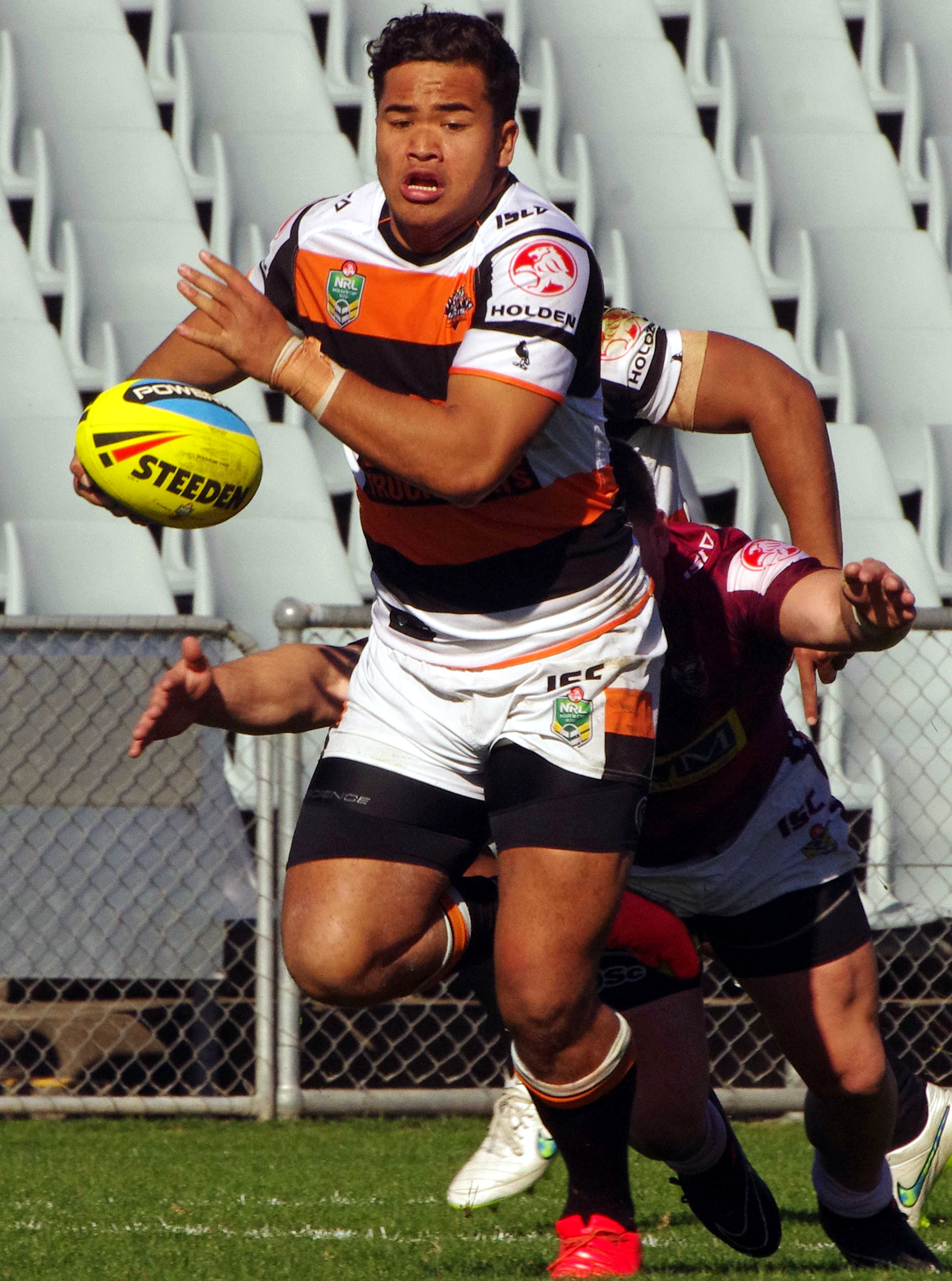
Marsters playing for the Wests Tigers in 2015

Marsters played for the Cook Islands in their 2015 match against Tonga. In 2016 he represented the Junior Kiwis in a match against the Junior Kangaroos.

He graduated to the Wests Tigers' Intrust Super Premiership NSW team in 2017.

=== 2017 ===
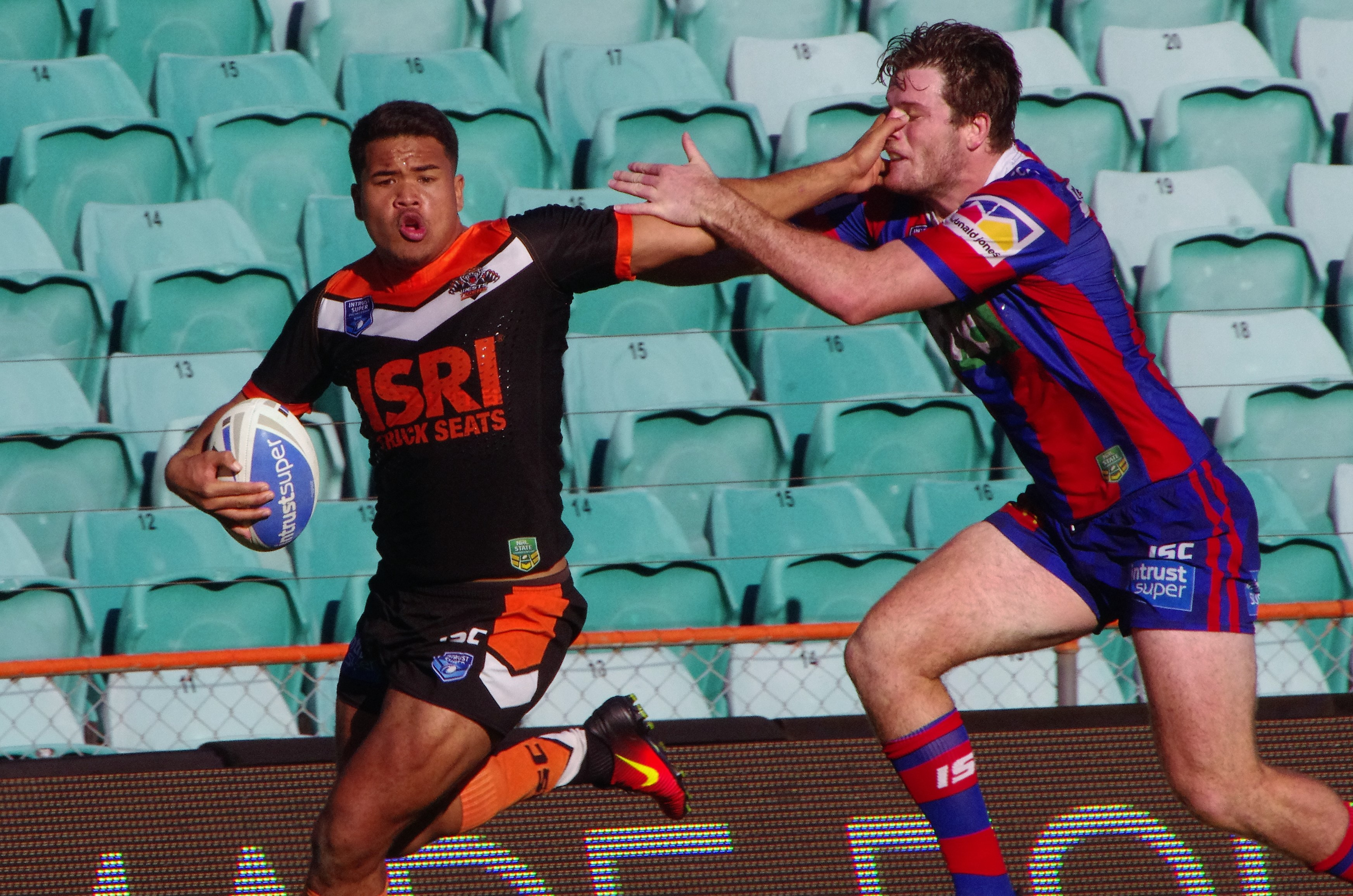
Marsters playing for the Wests Tigers in 2017

On 6 May, Marsters represented the Cook Islands in their 2017 Pacific Rugby League Tests match.

In Round 13, Marsters made his NRL debut for the Wests Tigers against the St George Illawarra Dragons, playing off the interchange bench in the 16–12 loss at ANZ Stadium. After playing on the bench for his first 2 games, he was in the starting team for the rest of the season, where he was described as, "a revelation at right centre". He scored 5 tries from 13 games in his rookie year.

=== 2018 ===
Marsters was said to be one of the most improved players in the game in 2018, and, "has been stellar in 2018, to the point he made his New Zealand Test debut and has claims on being one of the form centres right across the NRL." He was one of two players to appear in every game for the Tigers and was their top point-scorer with 124. The Daily Telegraph named in their team of the year, saying, "he was the only centre to crack 3000 metres gained and his 126 metres per match was the biggest average of any centre who played at least 15 games. He also lead all centres in offloads with 49 and was fifth in tackle busts with 65."

=== 2019 ===
In round 4, Marsters missed all three attempts at goal in a 9–8 loss to the Penrith Panthers, despite the Wests Tigers scoring two tries to Penrith's one. In round 9, Marsters scored two tries and kicked 3 goals in a 30–4 win over Penrith. In Round 20, he scored two tries in a 28–4 win over North Queensland at Leichhardt Oval.

On 10 October, the Wests Tigers released Marsters from the final year of his contract. On 14 October, he signed a three-year deal with the North Queensland Cowboys.

=== 2020 ===
In February, Marsters was a member of the North Queensland 2020 NRL Nines winning squad.

In round 1, he made his debut for North Queensland in their 21–28 loss to the Brisbane Broncos. In Round 6, he scored his first try for North Queensland in a 20–36 loss to the Wests Tigers. Following their round 10 loss to the Penrith Panthers, Marsters was dropped by interim head coach Josh Hannay. It was said, "Brought to Townsville to sharpen the Cowboys lacking backline and provide more attacking threats on the edges, Marsters struggled to live up to the hype. Defensive lapses plagued his start at the club, with his combination on the right side with Kyle Feldt the worst in the competition for conceding tries." He made just two more appearances for the North Queensland in 2020, scoring a try in their round 18 loss to the Melbourne Storm. Interim coach Josh Hannay explaining his absence by saying, "He is an extremely gifted player, Esan, but he can clock off at times out on the field. We have had some honest discussions around his work rate and consistency in that area."

=== 2021 ===
On 4 May, after just three games for the North Queensland club in the 2021 NRL season, Marsters was released from his contract and signed with the Gold Coast until the end of the 2022 season.

=== 2022 ===
On 17 September, Marsters signed a contract to join English side Huddersfield starting in 2023.

=== 2023 ===
Marsters played 20 matches with Huddersfield in the 2023 Super League season as the club finished ninth on the table and missed the playoffs, Marsters scored his first Huddersfield try in a round 10 defeat to Hull FC.

=== 2024 ===
On 25 May 2024 it was reported that he had signed for Salford in the Super League on a three-year deal. Marsters played 22 games for Huddersfield in the 2024 Super League season as the club finished 9th on the table, despite this Marsters scored 8 tries and was impressive enough to earn a call up for the Cook Islands in the 2024 Rugby League Pacific championships.

=== 2025 ===
Marsters played 23 matches for Salford in the 2025 Super League season scoring five tries. Salford endured a horror year on and off the field as the club finished bottom of the Super League due to severe financial issues and limited player numbers.

Marsters ran riot against South Africa Rugby League in the last round of the 2026 Rugby League World Cup qualifying match - captaining the side to a 58–6 win, coming up with 5 try assists and a try.

On 12 November 2025 it was reported that he had signed for Bradford Bulls in the Super League

== Achievements and accolades ==
=== Individual ===
- Wests Tigers Best New Talent Award: 2018

=== Team ===
- 2020 NRL Nines: North Queensland Cowboys – Winners

== Statistics ==
=== NRL / Super league ===
Season	Team	Matches	T	G	GK %	F/G	Pts
2017	Wests Tigers	13	5	0	—	0	20
2018	Wests Tigers	24	3	56	75.68%	0	12
2019	Wests Tigers	24	9	40	65.57%	0	36
2020	North Queensland Cowboys	12	2	0	—	0	8
2021	North Queensland Cowboys	3					
2021	Gold Coast Titans	5	1				4
2022	Gold Coast Titans	5	1				4
2023	Huddersfield Giants	21	3				12
2024	Huddersfield Giants	22	7				28
2025	Salford Red Devils	23	5	0	0	0	20
2026	Bradford Bulls			0	0	0	0
Career totals		152	37	96	71.11%	0	340

=== International (Cook Islands) ===
Season	Team	Matches	T	Pts
2015	Cook Islands	1	0	0
2017	Cook Islands	1	1	4
2022	Cook Islands	4		
2023	Cook Islands	2	1	4
2024	Cook Islands	2		
	Totals	10	2	8

=== International (New Zealand) ===
Year	Team	Games	Tries	Goals	Pts
2018	New Zealand	5	3		12
2019	New Zealand	1		5	10
	Totals	6	3	5	22

== Personal life ==
Marsters' cousin, Steven, is a professional rugby league player for the South Sydney Rabbitohs.
