= Carne Doyle-Manga =

Cook Islands international rugby league footballer

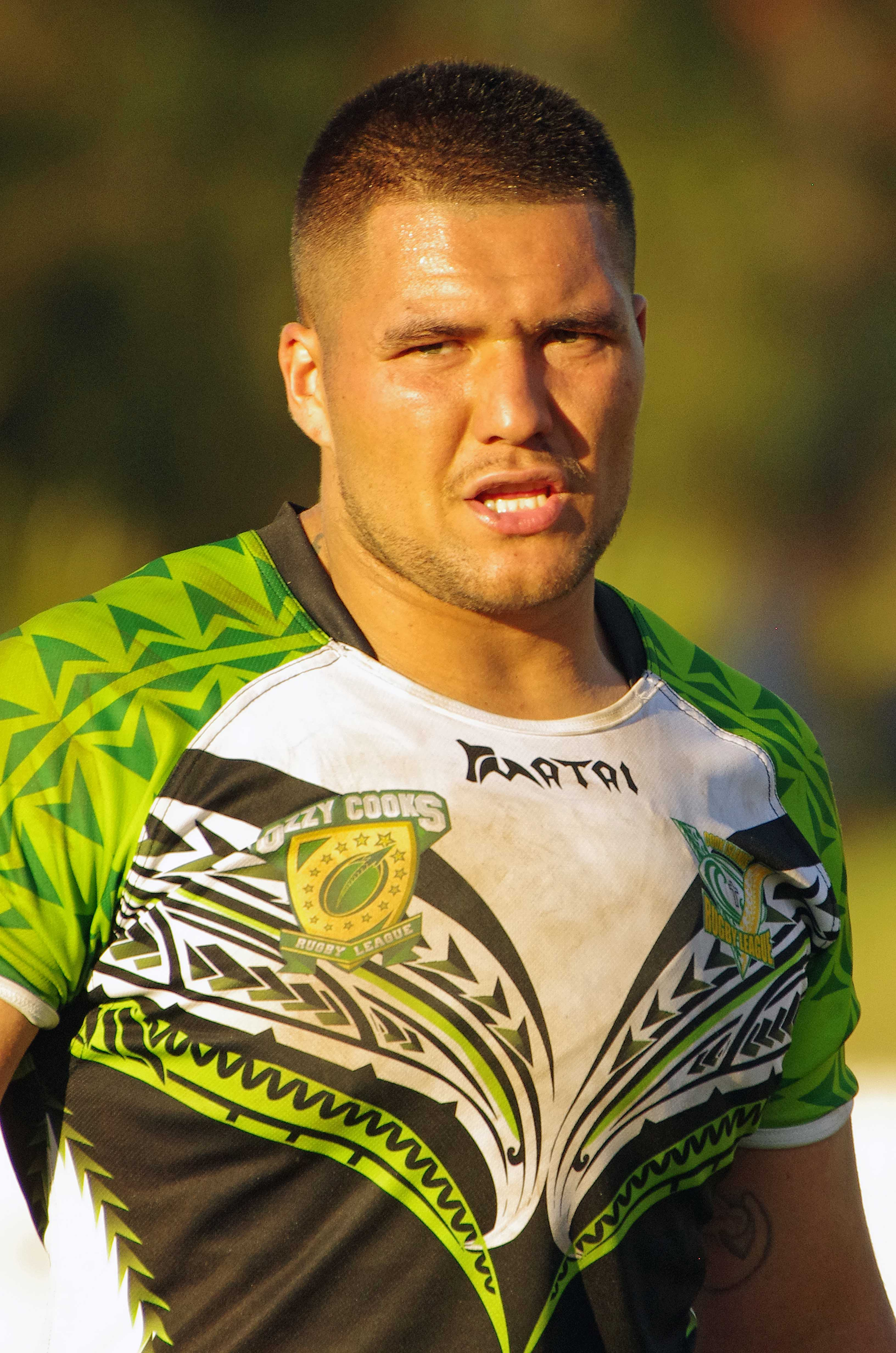
- Doyle-Manga in October 2015

Personal information
- Born: 6 July 1994 (age 32) Ōtaki, New Zealand
- Height: 192 cm (6 ft 4 in)
- Weight: 108 kg (17 st 0 lb)

Playing information
- Position: Prop, Second-row
Club
Years	Team	Pld	T	G	FG	P
2014	Newcastle Knights	3	0	0	0	0
2015	Canberra Raiders	0	0	0	0	0
2016	Wyong Roos	15	2	0	0	8
2017	New Zealand Warriors	0	0	0	0	0
2017	Tweed Heads Seagulls	17	0	0	0	0
2018	Norths Devils	22	4	0	0	16
2019	Newcastle Thunder	14	3	0	0	12
2020	Norths Devils	1	0	0	0	0
	Total	72	9	0	0	36
Representative
Years	Team	Pld	T	G	FG	P
2015–	Cook Islands	3	0	0	0	0
2016–18	New Zealand Māori	2	1	0	0	4
- Source: As of 16 July 2019

Carne Doyle-Manga is a New Zealand rugby league footballer who plays for Norths Devils in the Intrust Super Cup.

He has previously played professionally in Australia, New Zealand and United Kingdom. Doyle-Manga's main position is Prop but can also play as Second-row.

Carne now spends the rest of his days working full-time as a scaffolder in the Gold Coast, Australia.

== Early years ==
Born in Ōtaki, New Zealand, Doyle-Manga started playing rugby union in his local town before he was selected to play for the Hurricanes' Junior Development squad aged 15. Soon after, Carne made a cross-code switch to rugby league where he has remained since. He was offered a sports scholarship at Keebra Park State High School and continued to play rugby at Keebra Park and later joined Burleigh Bears RLFC following his move to Australia.

== Club career ==
After completing his scholarship, He was seconded by Newcastle Knights to play in the NRL Under-20s National Youth Championship where he made 3 caps. The following year he joined NYC rivals Canberra Raiders for the 2015 season. In 2016, Carne joined Wyong Roos and after making his mark on the NSW Canterbury Cup, he was invited to join New Zealand Warriors preliminary squad the following season. This brief pre-season stint landed him a position in the Queensland Cup with Tweed Heads Seagulls where he made 17 appearances. Following Seagulls away fixture against Papua New Guinea Hunters, Carne suffered a near-death experience after he endured an anaphylactic episode on board the return flight to New South Wales. Tweed Heads coach Jimmy Matson gave him a relief tablet and oxygen which gradually regained his breathing and kept him calm until the plane arrived back in Australia. The cause was determined to most likely be due to traces of nut present in a carton of Orange Juice which Doyle-Manga had purchased post match. After taking time to recover following this experience, he returned to play for Seagulls. Carne was notable for his Hard-Hitting style of play in the 2017 season which was noticed by Norths Devils Head Coach Rohan Smith who enlisted him into the 2018 Squad. Doyle-Manga made an appearance in each game for the Devils and had a tackle efficiency of 88% which made him a credible asset to the team. His outstanding performance in 2018 was recognised by Newcastle Thunder's Jason Payne. He signed a 2-year deal with the club and moved to the United Kingdom early into the 2019 season and has already made strides along with teammates to seek promotion into the RFL Championship. Following Newcastle Thunder's failure to qualify for the Championship, Doyle-Manga returned to Norths Devils.

== Representative career ==
In 2015, Carne was called up to join the Cook Islands team for the 2017 Rugby League World Cup play-off against Tonga. The match would ultimately determine which team would qualify for the World Cup. He came off the bench making his first International appearance in Cook Islands' 28–8 loss at Campbelltown Stadium. Doyle-Manga was also on the bench against Niue 2 weeks prior. He qualifies to play international rugby for the Cook Islands through his father.

Carne also made an appearance in the Cook Islands team against Lebanon in their 2016 friendly at Belmore Sports Ground. The final score came to 30–20 with Cook Islands winning the match.

In early 2017, he was named in Tony Iro's Cook Islands squad to face Papua New Guinea in the 2017 Pacific Rugby League Tests. He started at Prop earning his third cap for the Kuki's in their 22–32 loss.

Doyle-Manga was part of the 2016 New Zealand Māori XIII squad to play New Zealand Residents where he represented Ngāti Raukawa/Ngāti Kapumanawawhiti. Then in 2018, Carne was included in the 2018 team to face First Nation Goannas in the NRL Festival of Indigenous Rugby League. He scored a try for the team which gave them a six-point advantage over Goannas. New Zealand finished the match 22-16 failing to beat Goannas in the second annual festival.
