= Michael Cooper (rugby league) =

England international rugby league footballer

Mike Cooper
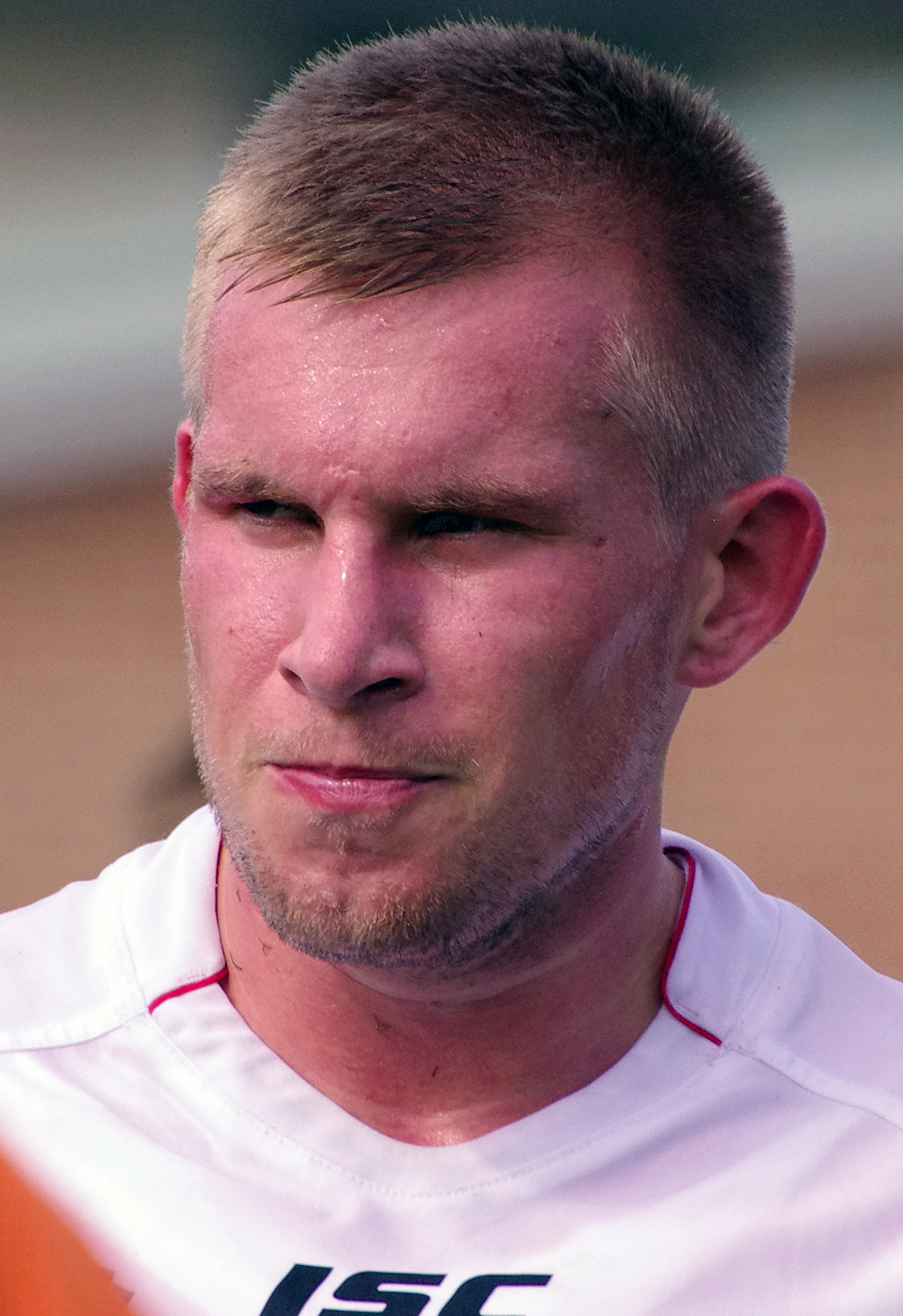

Personal information
- Full name: Michael Joseph Cooper
- Born: 15 September 1988 (age 37) Warrington, Cheshire, England
- Height: 6 ft 1 in (1.85 m)
- Weight: 17 st 0 lb (108 kg)

Playing information
- Position: Prop, Loose forward
Club
Years	Team	Pld	T	G	FG	P
2006–13	Warrington Wolves	130	9	0	0	36
2010(loan)	→ Castleford Tigers	6	2	0	0	8
2014–16	St. George Illawarra	69	3	0	0	12
2017–22	Warrington Wolves	142	13	0	0	56
2022–24	Wigan Warriors	19	1	0	0	4
	Total	366	28	0	0	116
Representative
Years	Team	Pld	T	G	FG	P
2011–12	England Knights	4	0	0	0	0
2015–22	England	13	0	0	0	0
- Source: As of 5 November 2022

Michael Cooper (born 15 September 1988) is a retired English professional rugby league footballer.

He previously played for the Warrington Wolves in two separate spells in the Super League, and spent time away from Warrington at the Castleford Tigers in the Super League. Cooper has also played for the St. George Illawarra Dragons in the NRL.

== Background ==
Cooper was born in Warrington, Cheshire, England.

On 21 August 2026, Cooper was handed an 18 month suspended prison sentence at Liverpool Crown Court, after it was heard he stalked his former partner and her friend between 21 October and 31 December 2024.

== Club career ==
=== Early career ===
Born in Warrington, Cooper began his career with Warrington when he was a part of an under-11s side who went through a whole season undefeated, winning the championship along the way. He continued through the junior ranks and eventually become part of the first team.

=== Warrington Wolves ===
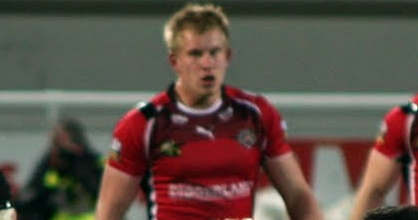
Cooper playing for the Warrington Wolves in 2010

He played in the 2012 Super League Grand Final defeat by Leeds at Old Trafford.

Cooper played in the 2013 Super League Grand Final defeat by Wigan at Old Trafford.

==== Castleford Tigers (loan) ====
Cooper had a loan period at Castleford in 2010. While at Castleford he got some regular first team action, due to Castleford's injury situation.

=== St. George Illawarra Dragons ===
St. George Illawarra signed Cooper on a two-year deal. The St. George club agreed to a release fee with Warrington to sign the then 24-year-old, who had been under contract to the wire through until the end of the 2014 season.

The St. George Illawarra prop missed only one match during his début season in the NRL. Cooper played 14 games off the bench as an interchange prop and nine games starting on the run-on side. Cooper scored one try which came against the New Zealand Warriors in round 7, and in the same game made his only line-break. Cooper ended the season with an average of 44.2 minutes played per game. He also made 237 runs, and 2,058 metres. He has the best tackles to missed tackles ratio, with an average of 28.1 tackles a game, with only 0.9 missed.

=== Warrington Wolves ===
In June 2016, it was announced that Cooper would be returning to Warrington on a three-year deal for the start of the 2017 campaign.

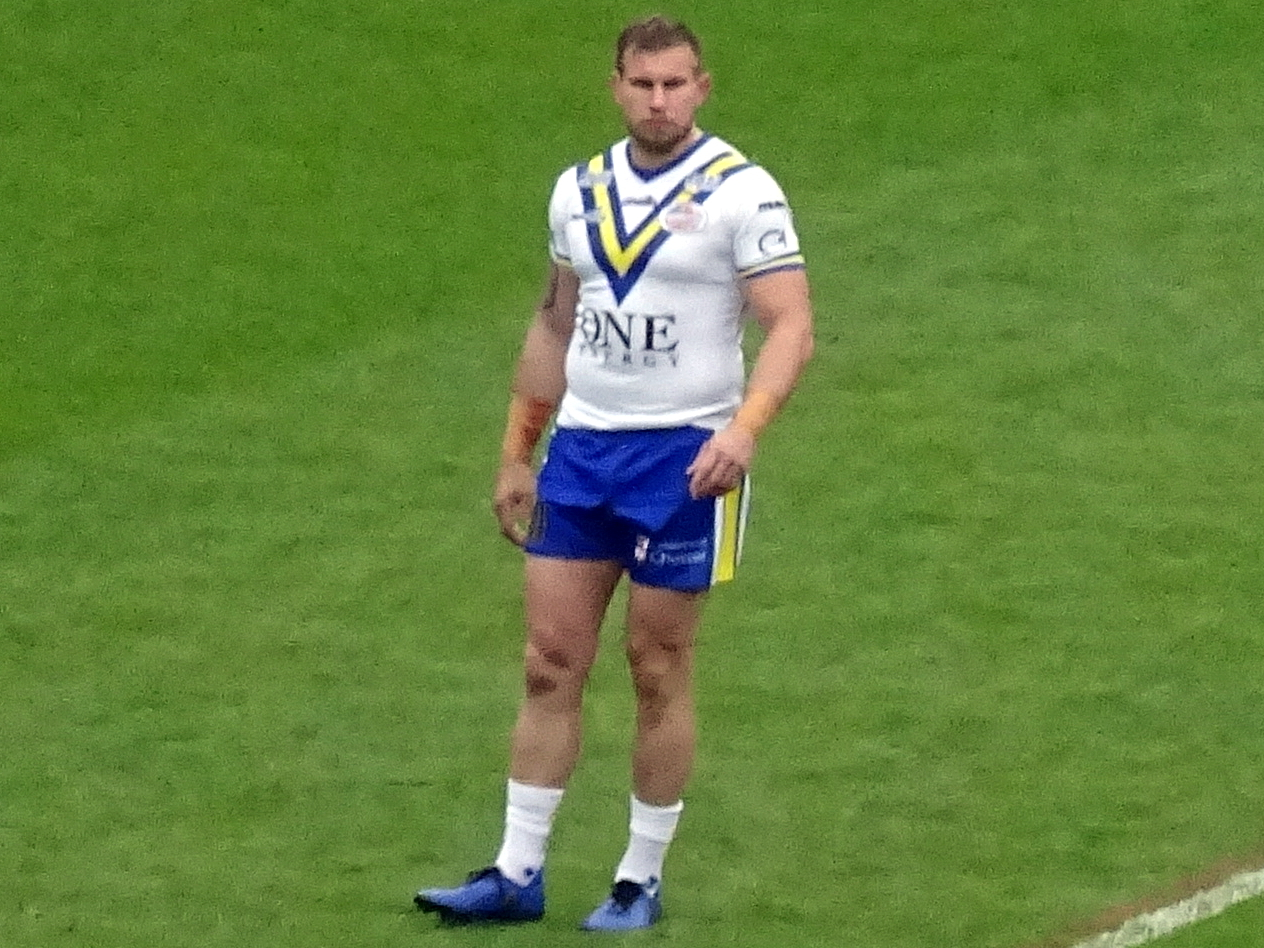
Cooper playing for the Warrington Wolves in 2019

Cooper played in the 2018 Challenge Cup Final defeat by the Catalans Dragons at Wembley Stadium. Cooper played in the 2018 Super League Grand Final defeat by Wigan at Old Trafford.

Cooper played in the 2019 Challenge Cup Final victory over St Helens at Wembley Stadium.

=== Wigan Warriors ===
Cooper joined Wigan in July 2022, with his departure from Warrington happening earlier than expected early after the initial deal was due to take place at end of the 2022 season. On 13 September 2023, Cooper signed a one-year contract extension to remain at Wigan until the end of 2024. On 24 February 2024, Cooper played in Wigan's 2024 World Club Challenge final victory over Penrith. On 8 June 2024, Cooper played in Wigan's 2024 Challenge Cup final victory over Warrington.

On 27 September 2024, Cooper announced that he was to retire from rugby league with immediate effect, following medical advice related to a concussion injury he suffered during a match against the Leigh Leopards on 5 July.

== International career ==
Cooper played for the England Knights in 2011 and 2012.

Cooper was selected in England's 24-man squad for the 2014 Four Nations.

After being selected in England's 2014 Four Nations squad, but not featuring in a match, McNamara selected him again for the 2015 end-of-year test series against New Zealand. In a test match beforehand, Cooper made his début for England in England's win over France.

In October 2016, Cooper was selected in England's 24-man squad for the 2016 Four Nations. Before the tournament began, he featured in England's test match against France.

In October he was named in the England squad for the 2021 Rugby League World Cup.

== Honours ==
=== Warrington Wolves ===
- League Leaders' Shield
  - Winners (1): 2011
- Challenge Cup
  - Winners (4): 2009, 2010, 2012, 2019

=== Wigan Warriors ===
- Super League
  - Winners (2): 2023, 2024
- League Leaders' Shield
  - Winners (2): 2023, 2024
- Challenge Cup
  - Winners (1): 2022
- World Club Challenge
  - Winners (1): 2024
