= Natalie Harrowell =

English rugby league player (1990–2019)

Personal information
- Full name: Natalie Harrowell
- Born: 9 February 1990
- Died: 10 December 2019 (aged 29); Castleford, United Kingdom

Playing information
Club
Years	Team	Pld	T	G	FG	P
201?–19	Featherstone Rovers
Representative
Years	Team	Pld	T	G	FG	P
2016–17	England	3	1			4

Natalie Harrowell (9 February 1990 – 10 December 2019) was an English rugby league player who played in the first-ever Women's Super League Grand Final in 2017. Harrowell played for Featherstone Rovers and was regarded as a "key member of the women's club team", she also held 3 caps for England Rugby League. She was admitted to the hospital with a virus and died on 10 December 2019.

== Representative career ==
Harrowell made her England debut on 22 October 2016 against France scoring the final try of the game as England won 36–6 in Avignon. The following June she was selected for the England tour of France in which England won twice in Perpignan for a 2–0 series victory.

Cap	Date	Opponent	Tries	Report
1	22 Oct 2016	France	1	
2	21 Jun 2017	France		
3	24 Jun 2017	France		
