= Martwain Johnston =

American gridiron and rugby league player

Personal information
- Born: February 28, 1986 (age 40) Syracuse, New York, United States
- Height: 6 ft 3 in (190 cm)
- Weight: 209 lb (95 kg)

Playing information
- Position: Wing
Club
Years	Team	Pld	T	G	FG	P
2011	Philadelphia Fight
	Delaware Black Foxes
	Total	0	0	0	0	0
Representative
Years	Team	Pld	T	G	FG	P
2017	United States	3	1	0	0	4
- Source: As of January 29, 2021

Martwain Johnston (born February 28, 1986) is an American rugby league player who plays for the Delaware Black Foxes. He was selected to represent the U.S. in the 2017 Rugby League World Cup.

== Early years ==
From Syracuse, New York. He attended George Fowler High School where he ran track and played football.

He played American football at the University of Delaware as a wide receiver.

He works for the U.S. Postal Service.

== Playing career ==
He played for the Philadelphia Fight in their premiership win 28–26 over New Haven Warriors in 2011. He scored a try for the U.S. in their 36–18 victory over Canada in October 2017.
