= Fotukava Malu =

United States international rugby league player

Personal information
- Born: December 2, 1993 (age 32) American Samoa
- Height: 6 ft 0 in (183 cm)
- Weight: 209 lb (95 kg)

Playing information

Rugby league
- Position: Second-row
Club
Years	Team	Pld	T	G	FG	P
2021–	Atlanta Rhinos	0	0	0	0	0
Representative
Years	Team	Pld	T	G	FG	P
2017	United States	3	0	0	0	0

Rugby union
Club
Years	Team	Pld	T	G	FG	P
	Atlanta Renegades
- Source: As of January 29, 2021

Fotukava "Hiko" Malu (born December 2, 1993) is an American rugby league player who plays for the Atlanta Rhinos and has played rugby union for the Atlanta Renegades. He was selected to represent the United States in the 2017 Rugby League World Cup.

== Playing career ==
He was part of the Atlanta Rhinos premiership winning team in 2017, where he also won MVP for the match.

He was selected to represent the United States in the 2017 Rugby League World Cup.
