= Tyler Cassel =

Scotland & Malta international rugby league footballer

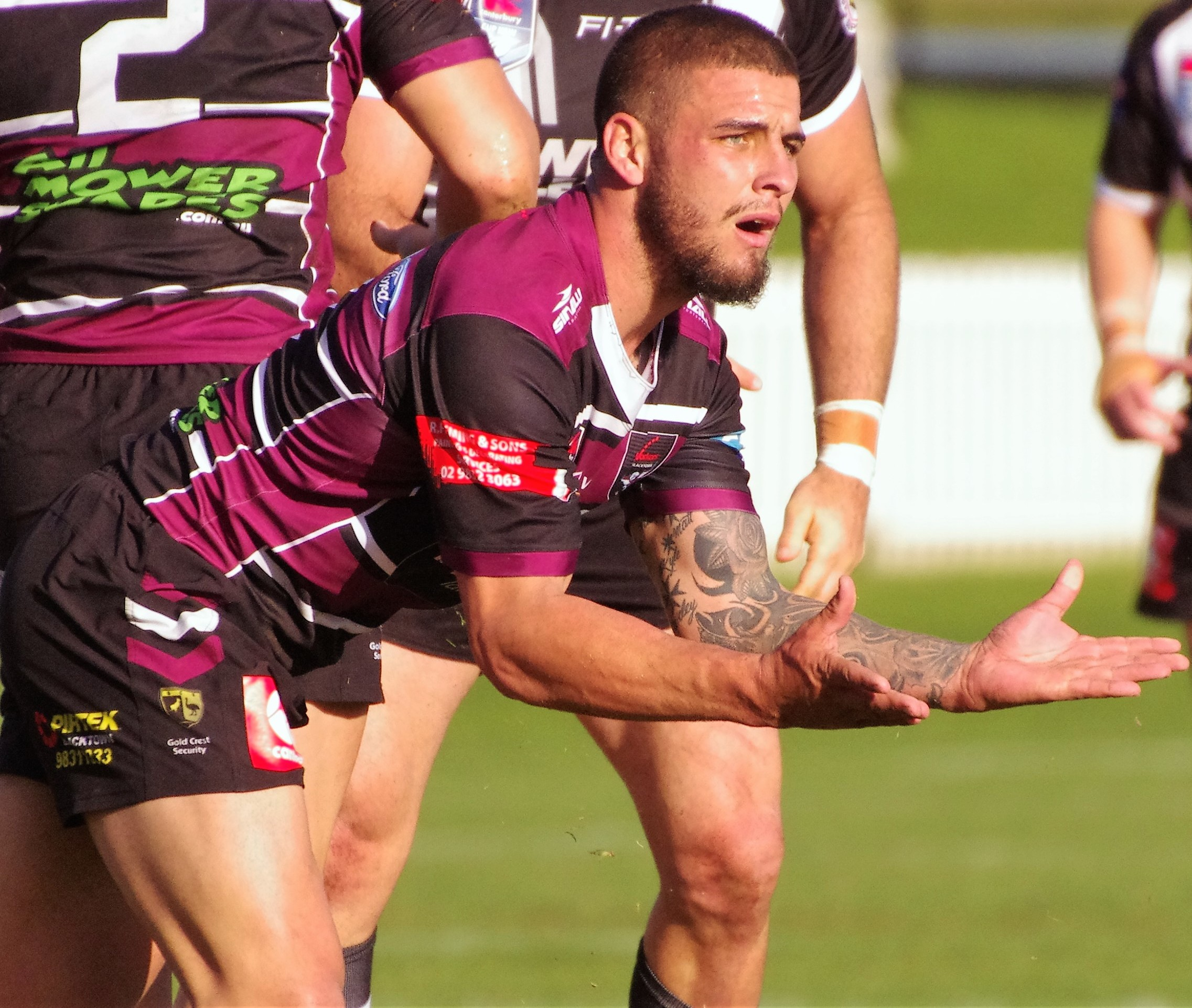

Personal information
- Born: 1 March 1995 (age 31) Paddington, New South Wales, Australia
- Height: 180 cm (5 ft 11 in)
- Weight: 96 kg (15 st 2 lb)

Playing information
- Position: Lock, Centre, Five-eighth
Representative
Years	Team	Pld	T	G	FG	P
2016	Scotland	1	0	0	0	0
2017–24	Malta	13	3	6	0	24
- Source: As of 15 August 2026

Tyler Cassel (born 1 March 1995) is a Malta & Scotland international rugby league footballer who plays as a lock, five-eighth and centre.

== Background ==
Cassel was born in Paddington, New South Wales, Australia

== Playing career ==
=== International career ===
On 21 October 2016, Cassel made his début for Scotland against a Cumbria Select XIII in a pre-tournament match ahead of the 2016 Four Nations. Cassel was also in the Scotland team for the match two weeks later against England.

He is also a Maltese international
