= Gabriel Farley =

United States dual-code rugby international player

Gabe Farley
Personal information
- Full name: Gabriel Farley
- Born: April 29, 1994 (age 31) Colorado, U.S.
- Height: 6 ft 1 in (185 cm)
- Weight: 214 lb (97 kg)

Playing information

Rugby league
- Position: Centre, Fullback, Wing
Club
Years	Team	Pld	T	G	FG	P
	Southampton Dragons
2014–17	Philadelphia Fight	10	5	10	0	40
	Total	10	5	10	0	40
Representative
Years	Team	Pld	T	G	FG	P
2013–17	United States	9	2	2	0	12

Rugby union
- Position: Centre, Fullback, Wing
Club
Years	Team	Pld	T	G	FG	P
2020–21	Austin Gilgronis	6	1
2021	Houston SaberCats	2	0	0	0	0
	Total	8	1	0	0	0
Representative
Years	Team	Pld	T	G	FG	P
2014	United States U20s	5	3	0	0	15

Gabriel Farley is a rugby league and rugby union player who plays for the Austin Gilgronis in Major League Rugby (MLR).

He represented the United States Rugby League Team at the 2013 Rugby League World Cup and the 2017 Rugby League World Cup.

He also played for USA Rugby U'20's All-Americans at the 2014 IRB Junior World Rugby Trophy. Primarily playing as a Center, Fullback and Wing in both codes of rugby.

== Playing career ==
Gabriel played his junior rugby league at the Sydney Roosters, progressing to the Under 15's, 16's and 17's development squads. In high school he attended Waverley College in Sydney, Australia playing in the 1st XV for the 2011 & 2012 season. In 2013, Gabe received a scholarship to attend Lindenwood University in Saint Louis, Missouri where he received a Bachelors degree. It was also in 2013 that he was named also in America's squad for the 2013 Rugby League World Cup, at which point he had played only one game for the Southampton Dragons in the American National Rugby League.

In April 2014, he represented the United States in rugby union at the under 20's 2014 IRB Junior World Rugby Trophy in Hong Kong. Playing in all four tournament matches and scoring two tries against Hong Kong.

In 2017, Gabriel joined the Philadelphia Fight in the USA Rugby League. Following a solid performance at the 2017 Americas Rugby League Championship, Gabe was further selected in the 2017 Rugby League World Cup squads for the United States Rugby League Team.

During a brief stint in Australia during the 2018 season, Gabriel was also selected in the New South Wales Tertiary Rugby League team after the Annual Tertiary Challenge at Panthers Stadium. Farley returns to rugby union on a deal that will also see him registered for the Austin Herd. He debuted for the Austin Huns Red River D1 side, scoring a try as a replacement against Dallas RFC. Austin Gilgroni's add Gabriel Farley for the 2020 Major League Rugby season.
